= The Dick Tracy Show =

Television series

- Also known as: The Adventures of Dick Tracy
- Genre: Crime, adventure, comedy
- Created by: Chester Gould
- Written by: Homer Brightman; Bob Ogle; Al Bertino; Dick Kinney; Ed Nofziger; Chester Gould
- Directed by: Grant Simmons; Clyde Geronimi; Ray Patterson; Brad Case; Steve Clark; John Walker; David Detiege; Paul Fennell; Abe Levitow
- Presented by: UPA
- Voices of: Paul Frees; Everett Sloane; Mel Blanc; Johnny Coons; Jerry Hausner; Benny Rubin
- Theme music composer: Carl Brandt
- Composers: Carl Brandt; George Steiner
- Country of origin: United States
- Original language: English
- No. of seasons: 1
- No. of episodes: 130

Production
- Executive producers: Peter DeMet; Henry G. Saperstein
- Editor: Ted Baker
- Running time: 5 minutes
- Production company: United Productions of America

Original release
- Network: First-run syndication
- Release: January 1, 1961 – January 1, 1962

Related
- The Famous Adventures of Mr. Magoo

The Dick Tracy Show is an American animated television series based on Chester Gould's comic strip crime fighter. The series was produced from 1961 to 1962 by UPA.

In the show, Chief of Detectives Dick Tracy employed a series of cartoony subordinate flatfoots to fight crime each week, contacting them on his two-way wristwatch radio. Tracy himself rarely appeared beyond the opening and closing sequences. The opening was designed so that local TV hosts dressed as policemen could introduce the cartoon by barking orders into a prop intercom, with Tracy answering "Okay, chief, I'll get on it right away."

== Summary ==
Everett Sloane voiced Tracy, while Mel Blanc, Paul Frees, Benny Rubin and others voiced many of the other characters, including:

- Hemlock Holmes, a loud, bumbling, Cockney police bulldog (named in honor of Sherlock Holmes and with a voice patterned after Cary Grant's) voiced by Jerry Hausner. He is backed up by his own police squad, the Retouchables—named after the Untouchables, but looking and behaving more like the Keystone Cops.
- Joe Jitsu, a parody of Charlie Chan and Mr. Moto (featuring many movie images of Chinese and Japanese culture). He is an intelligent detective who fights with martial arts (repeatedly slamming his victim to the ground while saying "So sorry!... Excuse me, please!... Begging your pardon!"). He is named after the Japanese martial art of jujitsu. Benny Rubin provided his voice throughout the series.
- Heap O'Calorie, a parody of Andy Devine, voiced by "Uncle" Johnny Coons. This redheaded Irish street cop has a serious weight problem and a penchant for stealing apples from an outdoor fruit stand. Before setting out on an assignment, Heap would invariably get the "word on the street" from a bongo-pounding beatnik (named "Nick") who communicated solely by beating coded messages on his drums.
- Manuel Tijuana Guadalajara Tampico "Go-Go" Gomez, Jr., essentially a human version of Speedy Gonzales, another Blanc character, though Paul Frees did his voice for most of the series. Go-Go wears a big Sombrero and a big grin and is often seen lounging in a hammock while waiting for an assignment.

A gag used in several shows was that if one of Tracy's detectives found themselves in sudden danger (a bullet speeding towards them, falling off a cliff, etc.) he would yell, "HOLD IT/EVERYTHING!/, PLEASE! (added to Joe Jitsu)" the action would obediently screech to a halt and "wait", while the detective called headquarters for further instructions, or he would call, "Dick Tracy calling..." The sign-off catchphrase, "(Six-two and even, (Note: A horse racing expression meaning odds of six to one for win or straight money, two to one for place money, and even money or one to one for show. In the 1941 film The Maltese Falcon, Humphrey Bogart's Sam Spade tells Elisha Cook Jr.'s Wilmer, "Six, two and even, they're selling you out, sonny.") added) Over and out" was spoken at the end of the call, before or no action would resume.

Villains taken from Dick Tracy creator Chester Gould's popular comic strip usually had names that served as descriptions of their physical appearance or some other peculiarity. All were paired with another villain for the cartoon series. They included Flattop who worked with B.B. Eyes, Pruneface and Itchy, Stooge Viller and Mumbles, The Brow and Oodles, and The Mole and Sketch Paree. Each pair of crooks had at least one member who smoked either a cigar or a cigarette on an extender. One villain created specifically for the cartoon was Cheater Gunsmoke, who appeared in two episodes. Gunsmoke was a Texas-sounding cigar smoker with a literal cloud of smoke obscuring his face and head. Of all the villains in the animated series, Stooge had made his first appearance in the comic strip earliest (1933) and Oodles latest (1955), six years before the show was aired.

Some of the villains were given voices patterned after famous actors. Flattop sounded like Peter Lorre, B.B. Eyes like Edward G. Robinson, Pruneface like Boris Karloff, and The Brow like James Cagney.

The cartoons seldom involved the title character. The opening scene of every episode showed Tracy in his office, speaking into a two-way radio the words: "Okay, Chief. I'll get on it right away. (Dick Tracy added) Calling..." He would then hand the case over to one of his comic law-enforcement assistants, who engaged in slapstick battles with the crooks (who, compared to their comic strip counterparts, were penny ante and not as bright). Tracy showed up at the very end, usually by car or helicopter, to congratulate the assistant on a job well done and take the crooks into custody. Tracy, as Chief of Detectives, presented an image of calm professionalism in contrast to the comedic roles that the funny subordinates played.

=== Lesson ===
Tracy would play a more prominent role in some episodes that were bookended with a quick lesson on real-world crime fighting. In these, Tracy would explain to the viewer how their local police use methods such as fingerprinting or the use of composite artists to help identify suspects.

=== Mr. Magoo crossover ===
UPA was also the producer of the Mr. Magoo cartoons, and a crossover was arranged between Tracy and Magoo in a 1965 episode of the TV series The Famous Adventures of Mr. Magoo. In this episode, "Dick Tracy and the Mob", Tracy persuades Magoo (a well-known actor in the context of the Famous Adventures series) to impersonate an international hit man whom he resembles named Squinty Eyes, and infiltrate a gang of criminals made up of Pruneface (their leader in this case), Itchy, Flattop, Mumbles, The Mole, The Brow and Oodles. Unlike the earlier animated Tracy shorts, this longer episode was played relatively straight, with Tracy getting much more screen time, and Chief Patton was part of the episode. It is notable for pitting Tracy against a coalition of most of his foes, a concept that would be adopted more than two decades later in the 1990 film. None of Tracy's assistants (Hemlock Holmes, Joe Jitsu, etc.) appeared and several villains sounded nothing like their Dick Tracy Show counterparts. For example, Howard Morris took over the roles of Flattop and Oodles, although Everett Sloane reprised his role as Tracy.

== Original syndicated run ==
These 130 five-minute cartoons were designed and packaged for syndication much in the same way as Associated Artists Productions packaged the 231 Popeye cartoon shorts and the pre-1948 Warner Bros.' short subjects. Usually intended for morning and afternoon children's television series, a local host would introduce the cartoon as part of the show.

The cartoon show was a success perhaps as a child's version of The Untouchables that was popular at the time. Local hosts of the show offered "Dick Tracy Crimestopper" badges and certificates their viewers could request by mail. Mattel toys manufactured a series of Toy gun and a board game with the Dick Tracy logo, and the Crimestoppers could communicate with each other by toy Dick Tracy wrist radios.

=== Episodes ===
No.	Title	Direction	Story
1	Red Hot Riding Hoods	Ray Patterson	Homer Brightman
2	Pearl Thief Grief	Grant Simmons	Homer Brightman
3	Jewel Fool	Brad Case	George Atkins
4	Scrambled Yeggs	Ray Patterson	Homer Brightman
5	The Oyster Caper	Clyde Geronimi	Ed Nofziger
6	Two Heels on Wheels	Grant Simmons	Homer Brightman
7	Cheater Gunsmoke	Brad Case	Dave Detiege
8	Gruesome Twosome	Ray Patterson	Homer Brightman
9	Racer Chaser	Grant Simmons	Bob Ogle
10	The Purple Boy	Brad Case	Ed Nofziger
11	Surprised Package	Steve Clark	Homer Brightman
12	Tanks a Heap	Steve Clark	Dave Detiege
13	Phony Pharmers	Ray Patterson	Ed Nofziger and Bob Ogle
14	Champ Chumps	John Walker	Homer Brightman
15	Stockyard Caper	Brad Case	Al Bertino and Dick Kinney
16	A Boodle of Loot	Grant Simmons	Al Bertino and Dick Kinney
17	The Parrot Caper	Clyde Geronimi	Al Bertino and Dick Kinney
18	Rogue's Gallery	John Walker	Al Bertino and Dick Kinney
19	The Catnap Caper	Ray Patterson	Bob Ogle
20	The Snow Monster	Brad Case	George Atkins
21	Hawaiian Guy	Steve Clark	Bob Ogle
22	Tick Tock Shock	John Walker	Homer Brightman
23	Lab Grab	John Walker	George Atkins
24	Escape from Sing Song	Brad Case	Dave Detiege
25	The Onion Ring	Clyde Geronimi	Bob Ogle
26	Funny Money	Clyde Geronimi	Homer Brightman
27	Flea Ring Circus	Steve Clark	Bob Ogle
28	The Flower Plot	Brad Case	George Atkins
29	The Brain Game	Clyde Geronimi	George Atkins
30	Penny Ante Caper	Steve Clark	Dave Detiege
31	Wheeling and Stealing	Paul Fennell	Al Bertino and Dick Kinney
32	Big Bank Bungle	Steve Clark	Al Bertino and Dick Kinney
33	Tobacco Load	Brad Case	Dave Detiege
34	The Boomerang Ring	Brad Case	Homer Brightman
35	Mummy's the Word	John Walker	Bob Ogle
36	Trickery at Sea	Grant Simmons	Dick Shaw
37	Stamp Scamp	Clyde Geronimi	Dave Detiege
38	The Hot Ice Bag	Ray Patterson	Homer Brightman
39	Cooked Crooks	Paul Fennell	George Atkins
40	The Elephant Caper	Grant Simmons	Al Bertino and Dick Kinney
41	Baggage Car Bandits	John Walker	Al Bertino and Dick Kinney
42	Gym Jam	Clyde Geronimi	George Atkins
43	Bowling Ball Bandits	Clyde Geronimi	Homer Brightman
44	Rock-a-Bye Guys	John Walker	Homer Brightman
45	The Ruby of Hamistan	John Walker	Al Bertino and Dick Kinney
46	The Platterpuss Plot	Clyde Geronimi	Al Bertino and Dick Kinney
47	The Nickle Nabbers	Paul Fennell	Dave Detiege
48	The Bearskin Game	Clyde Geronimi	Ralph Wright
49	The Newspaper Caper	Steve Clark	Dick Shaw
50	Grandma Jitsu	John Walker	Bob Ogle
51	Kidnap Trap	Brad Case	Homer Brightman
52	Tacos Tangle	Ray Patterson	Bob Ogle
53	Rocket Racket	Grant Simmons	Bob Ogle
54	The Venetian Bind	Grant Simmons	Al Bertino and Dick Kinney
55	Bomb's Away	John Walker	Al Bertino and Dick Kinney
56	The Fish Filchers	Grant Simmons	Bob Ogle
57	The Elevator Lift	Jerry Hathcock	Dick Shaw
58	The Alligator Baggers	Brad Case	Homer Brightman
59	Hooked Crooks	Paul Fennell	Dave Detiege
60	Lighthouse Creepers	Grant Simmons	Bob Ogle
61	The Vile Inn Case	Steve Clark	Ralph Wright
62	The Banana Peel Deal	Paul Fennell	Kin Platt
63	The Casbah Express	Paul Fennell	Tedd Pierce
64	The Retouchables	Clyde Geronimi	Al Bertino and Dick Kinney
65	Horse Race Chase	Ray Patterson	Homer Brightman
66	The Fixed Stare Case	Steve Clark	Ralph Wright
67	Cop and Saucer	Jerry Hathcock	Kin Platt
68	The Gold Grabbers	Clyde Geronimi	Dick Shaw
69	The Copy Cat Caper	John Walker	Bob Ogle
70	The Loch Mess Monster	Clyde Geronimi	Homer Brightman
71	The Windmill Caper	John Walker	Bob Ogle
72	The Old Suit Case	Jerry Hathcock	Ralph Wright
73	Smashing the Ring Ring	Jerry Hathcock	Chris Hayward and Lloyd Turner
74	Snow Job	Paul Fennell	Al Bertino and Dick Kinney
75	Court Jester	Steve Clark	Al Bertino and Dick Kinney
76	The Two Way Stretch	Ray Patterson	Nick Bennion
77	Steamboat Steal	Grant Simmons	Al Bertino and Dick Kinney
78	The Big Blowup	Jerry Hathcock	Al Bertino and Dick Kinney
79	Fowl Play	Clyde Geronimi	Homer Brightman
80	Bettor Come Clean	Paul Fennell	Dave Detiege
81	The Great Whodunit	Steve Clark	Tom Hicks and Bob Ogle
82	The Skyscraper Caper	Clyde Geronimi	Kin Platt
83	Hotel Havoc	Steve Clark	Bob Ogle
84	The Log Book Case	Paul Fennell	Ralph Wright
85	The Copped Copper Caper	John Walker	Bob Ogle
86	Small Time Crooks	Steve Clark	Bob Ogle
87	Evil Eye Guy	John Walker	Homer Brightman
88	Mole in the Hole	Jerry Hathcock	Homer Brightman
89	Feathered Frenzy	Ray Patterson	Al Bertino and Dick Kinney
90	Trick or Treat	Clyde Geronimi	Al Bertino and Dick Kinney
91	Down the Drain	Steve Clark	Kin Platt and Marty Murphy
92	Gang Town	Steve Clark	Dave Detiege
93	The Medicine Show Case	Jerry Hathcock	Ralph Wright
94	Air Freight Fright	John Walker	Dick Shaw
95	The Castle Caper	Clyde Geronimi	Cecil Beard and Bob Ogle
96	The Camera Caper	Steve Clark	Bob Ogle
97	The Big Punch	John Walker	Dave Detiege
98	Oil's Well	Grant Simmons	Al Bertino and Dick Kinney
99	Mardi Gras Grab	Ray Patterson	Al Bertino and Dick Kinney
100	The Manor Monster	Jerry Hathcock	Bob Ogle
101	Hot on the Trail	Paul Fennell	Al Bertino and Dick Kinney
102	Rocket n' Roll	Clyde Geronimi	Al Bertino and Dick Kinney
103	Lumber Scamps	John Walker	Homer Brightman
104	The Cold Cash Caper	Paul Fennell	Bob Ogle
105	Football Brawl	John Walker	Dick Shaw
106	The Ivory Rustlers	Jerry Hathcock	Al Bertino and Dick Kinney
107	A Case for Alarm	Grant Simmons	Al Bertino and Dick Kinney
108	Ghostward Ho!	Ray Patterson	Bob Ogle
109	Ham on the Lam	Steve Clark	Homer Brightman
110	Two Goons in the Fountain	Ray Patterson	Al Bertino and Dick Kinney
111	The Monkey Tale	Steve Clark	Al Bertino and Dick Kinney
112	The Pigeon Coup	Clyde Geronimi	Cal Howard
113	The Tower of Pizza	Steve Clark	Homer Brightman
114	The Old Mummy Case	Clyde Geronimi	Ralph Wright
115	Island Racket	Clyde Geronimi	Dick Shaw
116	The Big Seal Steal	John Walker	Homer Brightman
117	Crooksters' Last Stand	John Walker	Al Bertino and Dick Kinney
118	Choo Choo Boo Boo	John Walker	Al Bertino and Dick Kinney
119	The Van Vandals	Jerry Hathcock	Ralph Wright
120	The Bank Prank	John Walker	Cal Howard
121	The Film Can Caper	Grant Simmons	Bob Ogle
122	The Bird Brain Pickers	Clyde Geronimi	Homer Brightman
123	Quick Cure Quacks	John Walker	Dick Shaw
124	The Lie Detector	Clyde Geronimi	Homer Brightman
125	The Stuffed Pillow Case	Steve Clark	Bob Ogle
126	The Big Wig	Steve Clark	Al Bertino and Dick Kinney
127	The Last Blast	Jerry Hathcock	Ralph Wright
128	Crime Flies	Ray Patterson	Bob Ogle
129	The Sweepstakes Caper	John Walker	Cal Howard
130	The Chinese Cookie Caper	Grant Simmons	Bob Ogle

== Controversy ==
The Dick Tracy Show was pulled from syndication in the mid-1970s and mid-1980s, and was not seen for years afterward because of what some perceived as racist undertones and use of ethnic stereotypes and accents. Some Asian and Hispanic viewers charged that Joe Jitsu and Go-Go Gomez were offensive stereotypes. Two stations in Los Angeles removed the airings and edited episodes were then sent out while one station, KCAL Channel 9, which at the time was owned by Disney, continued to broadcast The Dick Tracy Show until July 4, 1990. Henry G. Saperstein, then the chairman of UPA, stated "It's just a cartoon, for goodness' sake." Saperstein also pointed out that Hemlock Holmes and Heap O'Calorie (who are British and Irish respectively) are also ethnic stereotypes. The ethnic stereotypes are also the primary reason the diginet MeTV Toons will not air the series.

== Home media ==
Select episodes were first released on VHS in 1986 by Hi-Tops Video, under the name of "Dick Tracy and the Oyster Caper". In 1990, the complete series was released by Paramount Home Video in thirteen volumes, each containing ten episodes and Crimestopper tips by Tracy (voiced by Everett Sloane).

All episodes were released by Classic Media on a 4-disc DVD "Collector's Edition" set in 2006 to celebrate the 85th anniversary of the premiere of the Dick Tracy comics. In 2007, Classic Media released two 16-episode volumes, with the first containing episodes 1-16 and the second containing episodes 17-32.

== In other media ==
- Go-Go Gomez made his first appearances in The Mr. Magoo Show the year before the premier of The Dick Tracy Show. He appears in the episodes "Requiem for a Bull" and "Fuel in the Sun". He is called by his full name and is voiced by Mel Blanc in these appearances, but is voiced by Paul Frees in The Dick Tracy Show.
- The UPA version of Dick Tracy was scheduled to appear as a cameo in the deleted scene "Acme's Funeral" from the film Who Framed Roger Rabbit. Curiously Dick Tracy already appeared as a cameo in the novel Who Censored Roger Rabbit? by Gary K. Wolf.
- Joe Jitsu makes a cameo in the Drawn Together episode "Foxxy vs. the Board of Education" and is depicted as an Asian student who is paid to take the SAT for other students.
