= Uncle Sam Magoo =

1970 American animated television special

- DVD cover
- Written by: Larry Markes; Henry G. Saperstein; Sam Rosen
- Directed by: Abe Levitow
- Starring: Jim Backus; Lennie Weinrib; Bob Holt; Patti Gilbert; Sid Grossfeld; Barney Phillips
- Theme music composer: Walter Scharf
- Country of origin: United States
- Original language: English

Production
- Producer: Lee Orgel
- Running time: 53 minutes
- Production company: United Productions of America
- Budget: $400,000

Original release
- Network: NBC
- Release: February 15, 1970

Uncle Sam Magoo is a 1970 television special directed by Abe Levitow, written by Larry Markes, Henry G. Saperstein and Sam Rosen, and musical score by Walter Scharf. The special stars Jim Backus as Mr. Magoo, Lennie Weinrib, Bob Holt, Patti Gilbert, Sid Grossfeld and Barney Phillips. The special aired on February 15, 1970, on NBC.

== Plot ==
Mr. Magoo goes to Hollywood to get a part in a film, but instead witnesses the history of the United States firsthand in a series of adventures that take place in different time periods.

== Cast ==
- Jim Backus as the voice of Mr. Magoo
- Lennie Weinrib - Uncle Sam, Miles Standish, John Alden, Paul Revere, Davy Crockett, James Marshall, Johnny Appleseed, Captain John Parker, Robert E. Lee, Daniel Webster, John F. Kennedy
- Bob Holt - Chief Strong Eagle, Indian Chief, John Smith, Chief Powhatan, Indian Chief 2, Kit Carson, Paul Bunyan
- Patti Gilbert - Priscilla Mullins, Betsy Ross, Tom Sawyer, Eleanor Roosevelt
- Sid Grossfeld - Benjamin Franklin, Thomas Wolfe, George Washington Carver
- Barney Phillips - Mark Twain, John Sutter, Patrick Henry, Abraham Lincoln, Martin Luther King Jr.
- Dave Shelley
- John Himes
- Bill Clayton

== Reception ==
DVD Verdict gave the special a positive review, saying, "Eschewing rah-rah jingoism in favor of explosive color, unforced humor, and majestic choral arrangements of American musical standards, this patriotic tribute to the U.S.A. was clearly a labor of love for all involved, and the feeling is infectious. A veritable cornucopia of sight and sound sensations, Uncle Sam Magoo is this collection's crowning achievement." DVD Talk called it a "bizarre bit of Nixon-era patriotism".
