= Hoyt Curtin =

American composer (1922–2000)

- Born: Hoyt Stoddard Curtin; September 9, 1922; Downey, California, U.S.
- Died: December 3, 2000 (aged 78); Thousand Oaks, California, U.S.
- Education: University of Southern California
- Occupations: Composer; Conductor; Producer; Inventor
- Years active: 1950–1989
- Employer: Hanna-Barbera

Hoyt Stoddard Curtin (September 9, 1922 – December 3, 2000) was an American composer, music producer and the primary musical director for Hanna-Barbera from its beginnings with The Ruff and Reddy Show from 1957 to 1965, and again from 1972 to 1986 until his retirement in 1989.

Curtin composed many of the theme songs for Hanna-Barbera's cartoons, including The Flintstones, The Jetsons, The Huckleberry Hound Show, The Yogi Bear Show, Quick Draw McGraw, Top Cat, Jonny Quest, Space Ghost, Super Friends, Josie and the Pussycats, The Smurfs, and The New Scooby-Doo Movies. In 1960, Curtin also started composing the incidental music for many Hanna-Barbera animated series.

During his five decade career, Curtin wrote, conducted and produced thousands of unique theme songs, musical cues and libraries of incidental music used during the production of animated cartoon shows. For instance, there are currently 2,047 of his compositions still registered with BMI and 1,102 of his compositions still registered with ASCAP.

Curtin's experience in advertising jingle writing honed his work in creating animation show theme songs. He said "In a commercial you have one minute, or forty seconds, to sell the product. Therefore every single note has got to mean something, and has got to do something. And that's exactly how I approached one-minute main titles: it was to sell the show".

Hanna-Barbera's co-founder Joseph Barbera said of Curtin "Few people ever have the chance to work with a genius. All of us at Hanna-Barbera who worked with Hoyt are among those few". Hanna-Barbera creative director Bill Burnett praised Curtin's work, saying "Music is so fundamentally important to cartoons. Hoyt (was) one of the two giants of cartoon music. (Burnett cited Warner Bros.' Carl Stalling as the other.) What Hoyt does is absolutely smokin', the greatest pieces of cartoon pastiches that have ever been created".

In 2002, Jean MacCurdy, then president of Warner Bros. Animation, said "Hoyt was the king of jingle-making. His strong suit was coming up with the themes that almost anyone on the street could sing at the drop of a hat. He was really quite remarkable".

Composer John Debney said of Curtin, "Hoyt was a jazzer, he was a keyboard player for one of the big bands and he was in the service. That's why his music sounds the way it does, he always loved those jazz chords, and they're fabulous."

Curtin was also an inventor who was granted six US patents for his novel designs of pipe couplings from 1974 through 1981.

== Early life and education ==
Curtin was born in Downey, California, the third of Mary "Louise" (née Draper) and Frank Montgomery Curtin's three sons.

Starting to play the piano at the age of 5, Curtin quickly began "writing music". He explained "Mozart, I was not. It was mostly gibberish, but I loved how my older brother would play them (his songs), adding to them, making them sound wonderful".

Curtin graduated from San Bernardino High School in 1940. While a student there, Curtin formed his own orchestra, the "Cornfed Sextette," and played in local jazz bands. During his senior year, Curtin wrote and conducted new arrangements of show tunes from the movie Down Argentine Way during the school's annual musical extravaganza. Curtin was elected vice-president of his high school senior class.

Curtin attended the University of Southern California, where he earned an accelerated bachelor's degree. While attending USC, he was a member of Sigma Alpha Epsilon. Curtin entered the V-7 Navy College Training Program in September 1942.

== Military service ==
Curtin was 19 when he registered for the draft in 1942. At the time, he listed his employer as the Ken Baker Band at the Windsor Hotel in Phoenix, Arizona.

Curtin joined the Navy, was commissioned as an ensign in the U.S. Naval Reserve with the rank of LTJG and served aboard a destroyer in the Pacific during World War II.

== Later education ==
After WWII ended, he returned to the University of Southern California, earning a master's degree in music. Curtin explained his decision to return to USC, saying "I studied piano all my life, of course, and went to USC's school of music and studied composition... I was supposed to go to Juilliard after the war, on the G.I. Bill, and the man who enters you asked me why I was going to Juilliard when USC had people like Ernst Toch and the biggies at the time. Why go to Juilliard? ...So I called up my friend who let me enroll late at USC and drove back there at about a hundred miles an hour and went to lake my masters degree. It was great! We had some marvelous teachers. I studied with Miklós Rózsa and I just kept writing all I could, trying to get a job and that's not easy.

== Career ==
=== Film scoring ===
Curtin first begun his career as a musical director for United Productions of America in 1950, starting the Mr. Magoo short Trouble Indemnity. He would compose scores for movies as well, starting with the film Mesa of Lost Women (1952). Curtin said "It's the world's worst film, I think. It was really bad when I wrote it but now it's worse. As I remember, it was about ladies on an alien planet who turned into tarantulas... I didn't have any budget so I had to do it with two pianos. A friend of mine, Ray Rasch — one of the real great jazz guys — played the other piano. We really had fun doing that". Curtin's score music was later reused in the Ed Wood film Jail Bait (1954, credited as "Hoyt Kurtain").

In 1956 Curtin was musical director for Thrillarama Productions in Houston, Texas. He conducted a 38-piece orchestra while recording the score he composed for the company's film Thrillarama Adventure, a Cinerama style travelog which used two cameras and two projectors. Curtin also composed two of the tunes heard in the background in Ed Wood's Plan 9 from Outer Space (1959), although he was embarrassed by the film's poor quality.

=== Commercial jingle writer ===
Disillusioned with film work, Curtin next found work at Cascade Pictures, Inc. in Hollywood, which was one of the pioneer commercial production houses in the early stages of television. Curtin said "It was marvelous, with a big orchestra". By the 1950s Curtin had become an in-demand composer for TV commercials.

=== UPA Studios ===
Curtin's experience writing musical jingles for advertising eventually led to his scoring cartoon music at United Productions of America, better known as UPA Studios. His first musical score was for Arthur Babbitt's 1950 The Popcorn Story, one of the Jolly Frolics series cartoons. Curtin also scored another Jolly Frolics series cartoon, director Pete Burness' Pete Hothead in 1952.

Curtin scored the 1954 cartoon When Magoo Flew which helped the work win an Academy Award for Best Animated Short. Curtin said he greatly enjoyed scoring cartoons. "I viewed the cartoon, wrote the music to fit and scored those at Columbia Pictures, with the Columbia orchestra. You scored to (the) picture and you played along so the producers could see how the music fit".

=== Animation Associates ===
Owner Rudy Cataldi hired Curtin in 1960 as the composer for the animated series Q.T. Hush, one of the first television cartoon series produced in color.

=== Hanna-Barbera ===
Curtin first met William Hanna and Joseph Barbera in 1957 when the Leo Burnett advertising agency hired him to write the musical score for a Schlitz beer commercial Hanna and Barbera were producing at the MGM Studios.

Curtin recalled the beginning of his career scoring Hanna-Barbera cartoons: "They were just forming their company. It was 1957 and they remembered a jingle I'd done and phoned me with lyrics they'd written to Ruff and Reddy..." Hanna and Barbera read the theme song lyrics over the phone to Curtin and asked "Could I write a tune for it? I called back in 5 minutes and sang it to them ... silence ... uh oh, I bombed out ... the next thing I heard was a deal to record it - The Ruff & Reddy Show!". Hanna and Barbera were leaving MGM to start their own cartoon studio and were offering Curtin and his company, Soundtrack Music Inc., an exclusive contract to compose their music. Barbera said "All of our first main titles were done in that fashion. Huckleberry Hound, Quick Draw McGraw, etc.". "We'd go back and forth like that. We'd all have a good time, and I think the music shows it".

Curtin became Hanna-Barbera's music director, enjoying a long lasting relationship with the pair. At the start of their relationship, Hanna told Curtin "We'll put the pictures on it. You make it happy".

During production of Loopy De Loop cartoon episodes in 1959, Curtin expanded his role from simply writing opening theme music to composing a library of "musical cues" used during sequences and could be compiled into a soundtrack heard throughout an entire episode. No longer needing to use "needle drop" music from sources such as the Capitol Records Hi-Q library allowed Hanna-Barbera to save money. Curtin created show themes, incidental music and musical cues for every Hanna-Barbera show that followed. Every Hanna-Barbara cartoon episode required a total of 22 minutes of musical cues and background music.

Curtin would refer to pre-production storyboards or watch film and videotape previews to make sure his scores fit and enhanced the Hanna-Barbara cartoons' action and mood. Curtin "created memorable themes for dozens upon dozens of series, as well as original underscore music that could be used in any number of situations".

Cartoonist Mike Kazaleh praised Curtin's talent which provided editors a novel way to construct cartoon soundtracks."The music he did was not only well written but designed in such a way that if you cut it into bits and pieces and rearranged them, they would still flow. That's planning".

Curtin composed the music for nearly 250 of Hanna-Barbera's cartoon series, as well as many of the cartoon series' theme songs, including The Flintstones, Top Cat, The Jetsons, Jonny Quest, Super Friends, Josie and the Pussycats, The Smurfs, and The New Scooby-Doo Movies and all its spinoffs until 1989. Curtin explained the process of creating theme songs, saying "Yes, I usually received the lyrics and composed using them to create the main titles. 85 were instrumental and 60 had vocals".

=== The Flintstones ===
Recalling how he wrote the Flintstones theme Meet the Flintstones in 1960, Curtin said "I wrote that sucker in a real panic because we were way behind. I did the music first with timpani - boom boom BOOM boom boom boom. Then I decided to go with the jazz band and singers". "It's a catchy little tune, just a simple thing... I like it, not because it's popular, but it's jammed on in clubs in every country because the chord changes are fun to play". "When The Flintstones was originally recorded, we didn't have synthesizers at that time. We just had a room full of timpanists, a whole studio full of them, like Swiss bell players! It was wonderful".

=== The Jetsons ===
Curtin's first attempt at The Jetsons' theme song used a small musical combo. William Hanna insisted he use a full orchestra instead.

A Date with Jet Screamer was the second The Jetsons episode in which daughter Judy Jetson wins a date with rock star Jet Screamer who performs the song "Eep Opp Ork Ah-Ah (Means I Love You)". The song was written in 1962 by Hoyt Curtin, William Hanna and Joseph Barbera. In 1986, 24 years after its original release, the song reached Number 9 on the Billboard Top 100 sales chart, having been "rediscovered" by radio stations throughout the US. The song was later covered by The Dickies in 1988 and Violent Femmes in 1995. The song is played in a space travel exhibit at the Minnesota History Center.

In 1985, 41 new The Jetsons episodes were ordered to fill a new syndication package that would include the original 1962 era episodes for broadcast in 1986. Curtin once again was musical director and oversaw the production. The theme song was re-recorded, this time in stereo. The new recording featured many of the musicians that played on the original theme song, including trumpet soloist Pete Candoli.

=== The Adventures of Jonny Quest ===
Curtin composed the music for the 1964 Jonny Quest television series. In a 1999 interview Curtin said, "My pianist, Jack Cookerly, invented the synthesizer as we know it for Jonny Quest. It was made of orange crates with a keyboard and thousands of vacuum tubes!"

Curtin recalled the Jonny Quest recording sessions took place at the Hollywood RCA studios using "...a regular jazz band of 4 trumpets, 6 trombones, 5 woodwind doublers, 5-man rhythm section including percussion. Alvin Stoller or Frankie Capp usually played drums. I always tried to get the same guys where possible. They were the ones who could swing and read like demons".

Curtin said his Jonny Quest theme was a real test of the trombonists. "I wrote it in a killer key because I know how to play trombone and I know the hardest place to play is all of the unknown, odd positions. There wasn't anything open. Just murder, E-flat minor". He said during the session the trombonists "Killed themselves because nobody wanted to make a mistake. Nobody wanted to get carved."

=== Matty's Funnies with Beany and Cecil ===
Animator Bob Clampett had left Warner Brothers to create his own cartoons. He contracted with Mattel Toys to produce toys designed around Clampett's new characters Beany and Cecil which would be promoted in the new animated show. Clampett hired Curtin in 1962 to write and produce the show's theme song.

=== Soundtrack Music. Inc. ===
In 1965, Curtin left Hanna-Barbera over a rumored dispute regarding ownership of his musical work and residual payments. He created his own production company, Soundtrack Music, Inc. in Los Angeles. His company employed eight composers and provided music on order for both broadcast programs and commercials. Ted Nichols succeeded Curtin as musical director at Hanna-Barbera. Curtin returned to Hanna-Barbera in 1972.

=== Battle of the Planets ===
In 1977 producer Sandy Frank negotiated the rights to the Japanese anime series Science Ninja Team Gatchaman (1972). While adapting the series, Frank renamed it Battle of the Planets and planned to expand the existing usable 85 episodes for international markets. Original composer Bobu "Bob" Sakuma's existing Science Ninja Team Gatchaman score didn't have enough content to cover the planned expansion of episodes.

The production team requested Curtin create themes and a full music library for the production. Since Curtin was contractually bound to Hanna-Barbera, he requested and was given permission to work on the project. Curtin recorded his compositions during four sessions in August, September and October 1978.

=== Later soundtrack work ===
Curtin's later film score credits include Joniko and the Kush Ta Ka (later retitled The Wilderness Journey (1969), Timber Tramps (1975), C.H.O.M.P.S. (1979) and Heidi's Song (1982).

=== Book soundtrack ===
In 1998, Curtin composed a soundtrack to accompany Molly James' children's hardcover book The Whimsical Verse of Olly-O which James reprinted after 30 years. Curtin's music accompanied James' recorded narration on a CD included with the book.

== Compositions ==
Animation

- The Popcorn Story (1950)
- Pete Hothead (1952)
- Safety Spin (1953)
- When Magoo Flew (1954)
- Mice Follies (1954)
- Downhearted Duckling (1954)
- That's My Mommy (1955)
- Magoo's Canine Mutiny (1956)
- The Huckleberry Hound Show (1958)
- Snooper and Blabber (1959)
- Loopy de Loop (1959)
- Q.T. Hush (1960)
- The Yogi Bear Show (1960)
- The Flintstones (1960)
- Top Cat (1961)
- Touché Turtle and Dum Dum (1962)
- The Jetsons (1962)
- Wally Gator (1962)
- Beany and Cecil (1962)
- Lippy the Lion and Hardy Har Har (1962)
- A Screen Gems Presentation (1963)
- The Adventures of Jonny Quest (1963)
- Peter Potamus (1964)
- Yogi Bear (1964)
- Linus the Lionhearted (1964)
- The Magilla Gorilla Show (1964)
- Wait Till Your Father Gets Home (1972)
- The Amazing Chan and the Chan Clan (1972)
- The Addams Family (1972)
- The Roman Holidays (1972)
- Sealab 2020 (1972)
- The Frogs (1972)
- The New Scooby-Doo Movies (1972)
- Josie and the Pussycats in Outer Space (1972)
- Speed Buggy (1973)
- Inch High, Private Eye (1973)
- The Three Musketeers (1973)
- Super Friends (1973)
- Butch Cassidy and the Sundance Kids (1973)
- Goober and the Ghost Chaser (1973)
- Yogi's Gang (1973)
- Jeannie (1973)
- The Count of Monte Cristo (1973)
- Emergency +4 (1973)
- Devlin (1974)
- Valley of the Dinosaurs (1974)
- The Partridge Family, 2200 A.D. (1974)
- Hong Kong Phooey (1974)
- Wheelie and the Chopper Bunch (1974)
- These Are The Days (1974)
- The Tom & Jerry Show (1975)
- Battle of the Planets (1975)
- Dynomutt, Dog Wonder (1976)
- Clue Club (1976)
- Scooby's All-Star Laff-A-Lympics (1977)
- The Robonic Stooges (1977)
- Challenge of the Superfriends (1978)
- Scooby's All-Stars (1978)
- Scooby-Doo and Scrappy-Doo (1979)
- The Smurfs (1981)
- Pac-Man (1982)
- Snorks (1984)
- Yogi's Treasure Hunt (1985)
- Galtar and the Golden Lance (1985)
- The Flintstone Kids (1986)
- The New Yogi Bear Show (1988)
- Jetsons: The Movie (1990) • Lyricist, Composer
- The Flintstones: On the Rocks (2001)

Live action TV programs

- Korg: 70,000 B.C. (1974)

Commercials

- Schlitz Beer Party (1957)
- Lysol Spray (1963)
- Brought to You by P.F Flyers (1963)
- P.F Flyers - Magic Ring (1963)

Audio recordings

- Japanese "Robot Spy" Read-Along LP (1965)
- 20,000 Leagues Under the Sea" Read-Along LP (1965)
- The Whimsical Verse of Olly-O (1998)

Film soundtracks

- Mesa of Lost Women (1953)
- Jail Bait (1954)
- The Man Called Flintstone (1966)
- Joniko and the Kush Ta Ka (later retitled The Wilderness Journey) (1969)
- Shoot Out in a One Dog Town (1974)
- Timber Tramps (1975)
- KISS Meets the Phantom of the Park (1978)
- C.H.O.M.P.S. (1979)
- Heidi's Song (1982)
- Rock Odyssey (1987)
- The Flintstones: On the Rocks (2001)

== Public service ==
In September 1975, Curtin's company Soundtrack Music, Inc. sponsored "Children's Music Day" and "Children's Music Week" across the US. The promotion was meant to "concentrate national attention on quality music on TV for the enjoyment of children".

== Inventor ==
Curtin was granted six US utility patents for his inventions of water-tight pipe couplings for irrigation and sprinkler system plumbing. The couplings were designed for use in in-ground sprinkler systems and included coupling designs for both primary installation and system repair. Among them: US-3857588 "Pipe Coupling", December 31, 1974, US-4035002 "Pipe Coupling", July 12, 1977 and US-4260181 "Pipe Coupling", April 7, 1981.

== Accolades ==
- 1950: Academy Awards – Nominee - Best Animated Short Film (Cartoon) – Trouble Indemnity
- 1955: Academy Awards – Winner - Best Animated Short Film (Cartoon) – When Magoo Flew
- 1960: Emmy Award - Winner - Outstanding Achievement In The Field Of Children's Programming - Huckleberry Hound
- 1961: Emmy Award - Nominee - Outstanding Achievement In The Field Of Children's Programming - Huckleberry Hound
- 2000: Winsor McCay Lifetime Achievement Award - 28th Annual Annie Awards
- 2024: Society of Composers & Lyricists - Hall of Fame Inductee

== Death ==
Curtin died on December 3, 2000, in Thousand Oaks, California, at age 78 after a long illness. His body was buried at Valley Oaks Memorial Park in Westlake Village, California.
