= What's New, Mr. Magoo? =

- Genre: Children's television series Animation; Comedy
- Created by: Millard Kaufman; John Hubley
- Written by: David Detiege; Mark Jones; Bob Ogle; Cliff Roberts; Milt Schaffer
- Directed by: Bob Richardson
- Voices of: Jim Backus; Bob Ogle; Casey Kasem; Hal Smith; Frank Welker
- Composer: Dean Elliott
- Country of origin: United States
- Original language: English
- No. of seasons: 1
- No. of episodes: 16

Production
- Producers: David H. DePatie; Friz Freleng
- Editors: Robert T. Gillis; Rick Steward
- Running time: 30 minutes
- Production companies: DePatie–Freleng Enterprises; United Productions of America

Original release
- Network: CBS
- Release: September 10 – December 24, 1977

What's New, Mr. Magoo? is an American animated television series which aired on Saturday mornings from September 10 to December 24, 1977, on CBS. It was produced by DePatie–Freleng Enterprises and United Productions of America. The series has the voices of Jim Backus, Bob Ogle, Casey Kasem, Hal Smith and Frank Welker.

This was the third series starring Mr. Magoo, following the 1960-1962 Mister Magoo, and the 1964-1965 show The Famous Adventures of Mr. Magoo.

It was one of only two animated series from DePatie–Freleng Enterprises – besides Bailey's Comets – to air on the CBS Television Network.

== Plot ==
The series maintains the established comedic formula of the Original 1950s shorts, centering on Mr. Magoo, an elderly, wealthy retiree who's severe nearsightedness continually compromises his perception of reality. Magoo stubbornly refuses to admit his vision impairment or wear corrective lenses, he routinely misidentifies his surroundings, objects, and the people he interacts with.

== Cast ==
- Jim Backus as Mr. Magoo
- Bob Ogle as McBarker
- Casey Kasem as Waldo
- Hal Smith
- Frank Welker

== Episodes ==
| No. | Title | Original release date | Prod. code |
|---|---|---|---|
| 1 | "Baby Sitter Magoo / Mr. Magoo's Concert" | September 10, 1977 | 001 |
| 2 | "Motorcycle Magoo / Who's Zoo, Magoo?" | September 17, 1977 | 002 |
| 3 | "Lion Around Magoo / Unglued Magoo" | September 24, 1977 | 005 |
| 4 | "Magoo's Monster Mansion / Mountain Man Magoo" | October 1, 1977 | 003 |
| 5 | "Caveman Magoo / Museum Magoo" | October 8, 1977 | 004 |
| 6 | "A Magoo Bagatelle / Tut Tut Magoo" | October 15, 1977 | 006 |
| 7 | "Choo Choo Magoo / For the Birds Magoo" | October 22, 1977 | 007 |
| 8 | "Good Neighbor Magoo / Kidnap Caper Magoo" | October 29, 1977 | 008 |
| 9 | "Boo, Magoo! / Magoo's Yacht Party" | November 5, 1977 | 010 |
| 10 | "Come Back, Little McBarker / Magoo's Pizza" | November 12, 1977 | 009 |
| 11 | "Gold Rush Magoo / Magoo's Fountain of Youth" | November 19, 1977 | 011 |
| 12 | "Miniature Magoo / Roamin's Magoo" | November 26, 1977 | 014 |
| 13 | "McBarker, the Wonder Dog / Spaceman Magoo" | December 3, 1977 | 012 |
| 14 | "Jungleman Magoo / Millionaire Magoo" | December 10, 1977 | 013 |
| 15 | "Magoo's Driving Test / Shutterbug Magoo" | December 17, 1977 | 016 |
| 16 | "Rip Van Magoo / Secret Agent Magoo" | December 24, 1977 | 015 |
