= Hell-Bent for Election =

1944 film

Hell-Bent For Election
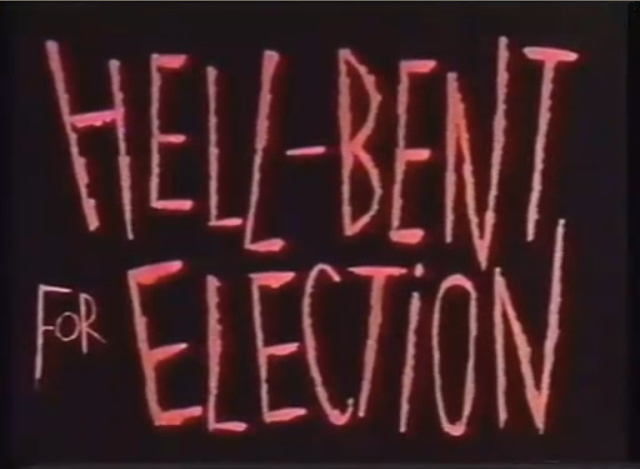
- Directed by: Chuck Jones
- Written by: Robert Lees
- Produced by: Stephen Bosustow (executive producer); Karen Morley (assistant)
- Starring: Marvin Miller (narration); Frank Graham (Joe)
- Music by: Earl Robinson; E.Y. Harburg (lyrics)
- Animation by: Robert Cannon; Ben Washam; Ken Harris; Ray Patin
- Layouts by: Zack Schwartz
- Color process: Technicolor
- Production company: United Film Productions
- Distributed by: United Auto Workers
- Release date: July 1944
- Running time: 13 mins (two reels)
- Language: English

The film (public domain)

Hell-Bent For Election is a 1944 two-reel (thirteen minute) animated cartoon short subject film.

The short was one of the first major films from United Productions of America (then known as "Industrial Films"), which would go on to become the most influential animation studio of the 1950s. As UPA did not have a full staff or a studio location until the late 1940s, this film was made in animator Zack Schwartz's apartment with the help of moonlighters from various local Hollywood animation studios. Among the moonlighters was Chuck Jones, who directed the film.

== Plot ==
The film is an allegorical campaign film, designed to inspire viewers to register and to vote for Franklin D. Roosevelt. The Democratic Party candidate, Roosevelt, is depicted as a modern streamlined locomotive, the "Win the War Special", pulling a high-speed freight train of war material. On the other hand, his Republican opponent Thomas E. Dewey is depicted as an old creaky steam locomotive, the "Defeatist Limited" (numbered 1929 as a nod to the 1929 stock market crash) pulling cars variously representing hot air, high prices, taxes, business as usual (a sleeper car), poor housing for war workers, a hearse for labor legislation, a small two-wheel cart with just a few apples inside for unemployment insurance, and finally a caboose with iron bars for windows named the "Jim Crow Car".

The conflict in the film centers on Joe, a railroad switch operator who represents the American voting public. He is warned by the station master, Sam (a representation of Uncle Sam), not to fall asleep at the switch as he did in November 1942. Joe must then decide whether to listen to a cigar smoking, gnome-like Dewey supporter and wrecker who tries to make him fall asleep at the switch, or to fight that influence and make sure that the Roosevelt "Win the War Special" stays on the track towards Washington. At one point, the phantasmagoric saboteur briefly metamorphosizes into Adolf Hitler whilst trying to beguile Joe into neglecting his duties. In cutaways, the Limited tries to slow down the Special (e.g. blowing smoke on him, and squirting oil from his pistons). After a notable nightmare sequence, in which Joe fights his way through sales taxes (tacks), 'frozen' wages, and rising prices (depicted by a boxcar always increasing in height so that he is never able to climb on to the roof), he pulls the switch to sideline the Defeatist Limited. The train tries to stop by running into reverse, which damages many of its cars, but when he is not able to slow down and hitting the switch which is against him, the train engine and his cars derail and crash. The "Win the War Special" advances down the track toward Washington, full steam ahead.

The film ends with a paean to the bountiful post-war world to come; the Win the War Special's caboose is the "Post War Observation Car", and constituencies such as Joe Soldier, Joe Farmer, J. Industrialist, Joe Industrialist, Jr., and Joe Worker are shown examining fold-out brochures depicting the benefits of the American post-war world, including the benefits of the GI Bill and Social Security.

== Analysis ==
Hell-Bent for Election is a far more literal film than later UPA productions such as Gerald McBoing Boing and the Mr. Magoo shorts. Nevertheless, its strong symbolism, non-literal design styles, and unusual camera angles made the short stand out among its peers.

The film was sponsored by United Auto Workers, and features a song, "We're Going to Win the War", written by Earl Robinson and E.Y. Harburg, the latter famous for writing the lyrics for The Wizard of Oz. Hell-Bent for Election was UPA's first major success, and paved the way for its later achievements, including nine nominations and three wins for the Academy Awards Best Animated Short Film.

The short focuses on contrasting attitudes toward World War II, with the contest between the "Win the War Special" (representing Roosevelt) and the "Defeatist Ltd" (representing Dewey). The argument between Joe and The Wrecker refers to the War and attitudes toward it. Joe argues that "we" [Americans] are out to win the war, while The Wrecker snarls that this is Roosevelt's war. As he says that, the Wrecker transforms into a caricature of Adolf Hitler. After a psychedelic dream sequence, Joe's awakening results in him sending the munitions-laden Special on its run toward victory. On the road to Washington, which characterizes the hope for a peaceful post-WW2 world, a billboard depicting Adolf Hitler, Benito Mussolini, and a caricature of Hideki Tojo is featured. The "Post War Observation Car" displays veterans' benefits and full employment as post-war goals.

== Sources ==
- Shull, Michael S.; Wilt, David E. (2004). "Filmography 1944". Doing Their Bit: Wartime American Animated Short Films, 1939–1945. Jefferson, NC: McFarland & Company. ISBN 978-0-7864-8169-9.

== See also ==
- List of American films of 1944
- 1944 United States presidential election
- United Productions of America
