= Joe Jitsu (Dick Tracy) =

American animated television character

Publication information
- Publisher: Tribune Media Services
- First appearance: January 1, 1961; The Dick Tracy Show

In-story information
- Supporting character of: Dick Tracy
- Abilities: Martial arts

Joe Jitsu is a fictional police officer, one of Dick Tracy's crimefighters in the 1961 syndicated animated cartoon series of the popular comic strip. He has since been criticised as a Japanese stereotype. He is named after Ju-Jitsu, a Japanese martial art. His method of subduing criminals was to grab them by the wrist, and exclaim "So solly!" and "Excuse, prease!" while repeatedly judo-flipping them on the ground violently. The voice for this character was provided by Benny Rubin.

Both Joe Jitsu and Go-Go Gomez, a Mexican stereotype, have been edited out of some reruns of the Dick Tracy cartoon series. Henry G. Saperstein, then the chairman of UPA, stated "It's just a cartoon, for goodness' sake." Others pointed out that the 'stereotypes' included two Europeans (Hemlock Holmes and Heap O'Calorie, who are British and Irish respectively), and that the Joe Jitsu character was a deliberate attempt to re-introduce a sympathetic Japanese character after the passions of the last war had died down. Saperstein said that the "‘Tracy’ cartoons portray (Joe Jitsu and Go Go Gomez) as good, clean cops who don’t take bribes or get indicted and consistently bring criminals to justice. How about focusing on these attributes as ‘role models’ instead of exaggerating a nothing controversy from a self-appointed tiny do-gooder protest group? C’mon, guys, these are only old cartoons. Sit back and enjoy them."

== In other media ==
- Joe Jitsu makes a cameo in the Drawn Together episode "Foxxy vs. the Board of Education as one of the Asian students who takes the SAT in place of students who are using them to fake their scores.
