= Brotherhood of Man (1945 film) =

- Directed by: Robert Cannon
- Story by: John Hubley; Phil Eastman; Ring Lardner, Jr. Maurice Rapf
- Based on: The Races of Mankind by Ruth Benedict and Gene Weltfis
- Produced by: John Hubley; Stephen Bosustow (executive)
- Music by: Paul Smith
- Animation by: Robert Cannon; Ken Harris; Ben Washam
- Layouts by: John Hubley; Paul Julian
- Color process: Color
- Production company: United Productions of America
- Distributed by: United Auto Workers
- Release date: January 2, 1945
- Running time: 11 minutes
- Language: English

Brotherhood of Man is a 1945 industrial film; a 11-minute animated short produced by United Productions of America (UPA). The short, considered by some as UPA's breakthrough production, is based upon The Races of Mankind, an anti-discrimination pamphlet written by Ruth Benedict and Gene Weltfis and printed and distributed by the Public Affairs Committee.

== History ==
Brotherhood of Man attempts to debunk and delegitimize racial prejudices based upon skin color and country of origin. It was commissioned by United Auto Workers, an American labor union, in hopes of helping to solve race-relation problems among its automobile factory employee members, particularly in the southern United States and in Detroit, Michigan.

The short was directed by Robert Cannon and produced by John Hubley, who collaborated on the screenplay with UPA's Phil Eastman and live-action Hollywood writers Maurice Rapf and Ring Lardner, Jr. In addition to its pro-integration messaging, Brotherhood of Man was unusual for an animated film of the 1940s in its uses of stark geometrical shapes, flat colors, and stylized movement, elements that would become commonplace in the industry as UPA moved into entertainment films such as Gerald Mc Boing-Boing and the Mister Magoo series.

The film was attacked by anti-communist factions after being screened at the Museum of Modern Art in 1947. This was in part due to the participation of "known leftists" Lardner and Rapf. In addition, the source Races of Mankind pamphlet was decried as "leftist propaganda" as the Second Red Scare began to take hold in the United States; the pamphlet was banned by the United States Army. The Brotherhood of Man film itself was named in a 1948 California State Senate report on potential communist activities in the state.

Lardner, Rapf, Hubley, and Eastman would all end up blacklisted due to testimonies given to or evidence from the House Un-American Activities Committee a few years after this production. Lardner became one of the infamous Hollywood Ten, and Hubley was forced out of UPA, which he was a ten-percent co-owner of, in 1952.

Brotherhood of Man has been preserved by the Library of Congress through the National Film Preservation Foundation.
