= Gay Purr-ee =

1962 film by Abe Levitow

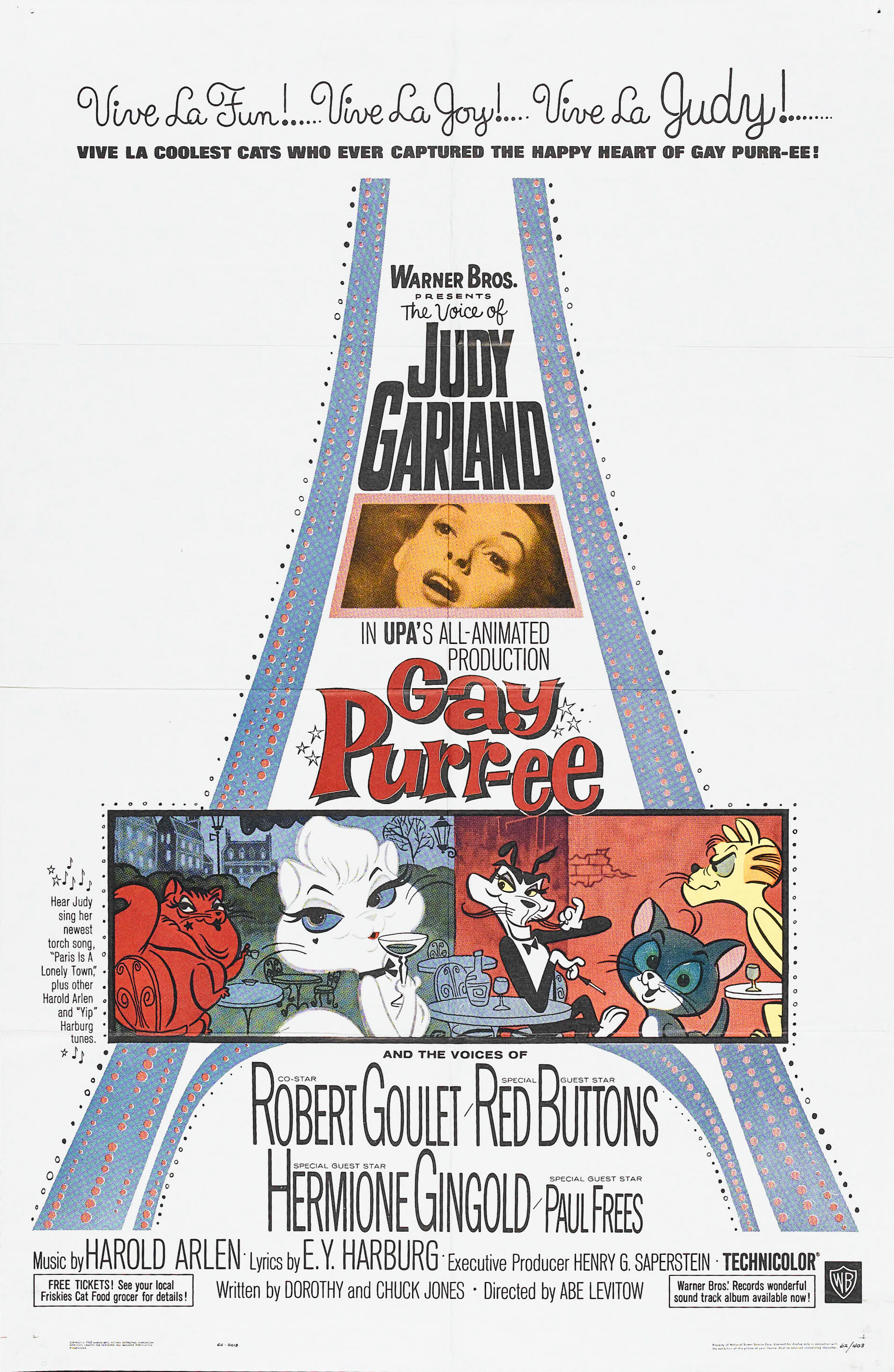
- Theatrical release poster
- Directed by: Abe Levitow
- Written by: Dorothy Jones; Chuck Jones
- Produced by: Henry G. Saperstein; Lee Orgel
- Starring: Judy Garland; Robert Goulet; Red Buttons; Hermione Gingold; Paul Frees; Mel Blanc
- Edited by: Earl Bennett; Sam Horta
- Music by: Harold Arlen
- Production company: United Productions of America
- Distributed by: Warner Bros. Pictures
- Release date: October 24, 1962
- Running time: 85 minutes
- Country: United States
- Language: English
- Budget: $1.3 million

Gay Purr-ee is a 1962 American animated musical film produced by United Productions of America and released by Warner Bros. Pictures. It features the voice of Judy Garland as Mewsette, a cat living in the French countryside wanting to go to Paris, and Robert Goulet as her love interest Jaune Tom. It was Garland's only animated-film role and Goulet's first feature film. It was the first animated feature film to be theatrically released by Warner Bros., and the second and final animated film by UPA. The film received positive reviews but was a box office failure.

== Plot ==
The story is predominantly set in 1895 Paris but starts on a rural Provence farm. The lovely cat Mewsette and the accomplished but shy mouser Jaune Tom are in love until Mewsette becomes frustrated with Tom's plebeian ways (and those of farmlife), and calls him a "clumsy country clod". Inspired by the human Jeanette's stories of the glamour and sophistication of Parisian life, Mewsette runs away to Paris. Upon arrival, she encounters the slick con-cat Meowrice. Taking advantage of Mewsette's country naivete, he puts her in the sultry Madame Henrietta Reubens-Chatte care. She promises to turn Mewsette into a dainty debutante known as "The Belle of all Paris". Unbeknownst to Mewsette, Meowrice is grooming her to be the mail-order bride of a rich American cat known as "Mr. Henry Phtt" ("The Money Cat"). Meanwhile, Jaune Tom and his sidekick, Robespierre, arrive in Paris to search for Mewsette.

Mewsette's training does not go well. Just as she about to give up and return to the farm, Meowrice takes her out to see Paris' feline side of the Eiffel Tower, the Champs-Élysées, the Mewlon Rouge, and then a buggy ride back to Madame Henrietta's. Reinvigorated, she returns to her studies. Jaune Tom and Robespierre arrive in Paris but get waylaid by one of Meowrice's shadowy cat henchmen and barely escape drowning in Paris's labyrinthine sewers. By coincidence, Jaune Tom displays his incredible mouse-hunting skills in front of Meowrice, who seeing a money-making opportunity, gets them drunk, and sells them as mousers on a ship bound for Alaska. On the ship, Robespierre consoles a depressed Jaune Tom, telling him that any problem can be broken up into manageable pieces.

Mewsette finishes her training and is now lovely enough to impress even Meowrice, who commissions a series of portraits of her to send to Phtt. Meowrice quietly writes a check with invisible ink to pay Madame Reubens-Chatte for her services, then takes Mewsette to his hideout in Notre-Dame. He reveals his plan to ship her to America and tries to coerce her into a luggage crate. After seeing a portrait of Phtt, Mewsette escapes Meowrice and his sidekicks. She leads them on a chase to a bulldog, who injures Meowrice badly enough to put him out of action for six weeks. Meanwhile, his sycophants unsuccessfully comb the city for Mewsette and, shortly after arriving in Alaska, Jaune Tom and Robespierre strike gold. Now wealthy, the two cats hurry back to Paris.

A disillusioned and homeless Mewsette wanders around Paris. She stops atop a bridge over the river, considering ending her misery. Just then, Meowrice and his cohorts ambush and capture her. She is taken to the Gare du Nord railway station, en route to a boat bound for America. All hope seems lost until Jaune Tom and Robespierre arrive. They have been aided by Madame Henrietta, who is outraged that Meoworice double-crossed her. Fighting inside the train, the three heroes defeat Meowrice and pack him into the packing crate as a surprise for Phtt. The film concludes with Mewsette, Jaune Tom, and Robespierre enjoying the high life in Paris that Mewsette was seeking when she left home.

== Voice cast ==
- Judy Garland as Mewsette, a beautiful white Turkish Angora and Jaune Tom's girlfriend.
- Robert Goulet as Jaune Tom, an orange tabby cat.
- Paul Frees as Meowrice, a slim tuxedo cat. Frees also plays the voice of the cat from the railway station.
- Red Buttons as Robespierre, a young black and white cat and Jaune Tom's friend and sidekick.
- Hermione Gingold as Mme. Rubens-Chatte, Meowrice's "sister" and a Persian cat.
- Morey Amsterdam as Narrator and Man on Ship.
- Mel Blanc as Bulldog and additional voices.
- The Mellomen as Meowrice's business partners (singing voices).
- Julie Bennett and Joan Gardner as two ladies from Provence.
- Thurl Ravenscroft as Singing Hench Cat (uncredited).

== Production ==
Gay Purr-ee was the second and final feature film, following 1001 Arabian Nights with Mr. Magoo, produced by UPA (United Productions of America), a studio which had revolutionized animation during the 1950s by incorporating design and limited animation.

The script for Gay Purr-ee was written by Dorothy Webster Jones and her husband, Chuck Jones, who was a veteran director for Warner Bros. Cartoons. One of the former animators from his Warner Bros. unit, Abe Levitow, directed the film. According to the production notes on the DVD edition, it was Garland who suggested that her Wizard of Oz songwriters, Harold Arlen and E.Y. Harburg, should write and compose the songs for Gay Purr-ee.

A copyright entry for a song titled "Free at Last" made for the film exists, though it is not included in the final production.

When Warner Bros. became the film's distributor, they discovered that Chuck Jones had worked on the film. After a long debate with management over the details of Jones' exclusivity agreement, the studio fired Jones in July 1962 and laid off his staff after they had finished their next cartoon. After Warner Bros. Cartoons was closed a year later, Jones hired his old unit for his first independent studio, Sib Tower 12 Productions.

== Reception ==
Gay Purr-ee was theatrically released on October 24, 1962. On the review aggregator website Rotten Tomatoes, 60% of 5 critics' reviews are positive, with an average rating of 5.8/10.

Bosley Crowther of The New York Times felt the film's backgrounds were "good-natured tone and diverting" but felt "the characters almost pale by contrast". Philip K. Scheuer of the Los Angeles Times wrote: "The animation, in Technicolor, is inventive enough, leaning toward the economy of motion with which UPA revolutionized the cartoon movie (to say nothing of the TV commercial) and filling in the backgrounds with charming semi-abstractions in consonance with what might be called the modern French manner." Variety felt the film was "hampered by an uninspired storyline, but its otherwise slick and meticulous production values overshadow the weakness with ample artistry." A Newsweek review felt that the film's subject matter was too sophisticated for an animated film, drily noting that its target audience seemed to be "the fey four-year-old of recherché taste". Jerry Beck, in his 2005 book The Animated Movie Guide, felt Gay Purr-ee was "a good effort" and "unjustly underrated". Despite its "strong design sense" and voice cast, he agreed the animation quality is sometimes "on a television level or worse".

Multiple analyses have noted its modernist style, called "remarkably designed" in one such review.

One analysis claims the modernist aesthetic has plot implications: though both urban and pastoral landscapes are equally "highlighted", the plot praises the triumph of "pastoral nature over corrupt urban technology".

=== Home media ===
Gay Pur-ee was released on VHS and LaserDisc in 1991 by Warner Home Video (under the Warner Bros. Family Entertainment label). The film was reissued on VHS in 1992 and 1994, then released on DVD for the first time in 2003, and later also re-released on DVD in 2014 as a manufactured-on-demand (MOD) title from the Warner Archive Collection. It has been released in HD on streaming services. The film was released on Blu-ray on August 29, 2023, from Warner Archive.

At the time of the film's 1962 release, a full comic book version of the film was released that pretty much copied the film scene for scene; with only minor changes.

== Adaptations ==
=== Comic books ===
A comic book adaptation was created in 1963 and published by Gold Key Comics.

=== Soundtrack ===
On November 4, 2003, Rhino Handmade, a division of the Warner Music Group, released the soundtrack on CD. This was identical to the 1962 LP version but contained 5 additional demo tracks.

== See also ==
- List of American films of 1962
- The Aristocats
- A Cat in Paris

== Bibliography ==
- Barrier, Michael (1999). Hollywood Cartoons: American Animation in Its Golden Age. Oxford University Press. ISBN 978-0-1980-2079-0.
- Jones, Chuck (1999). Chuck Amuck: The Life and Times of an Animated Cartoonist. Farrar, Straus and Giroux. ISBN 978-0-374-52620-7.
- Maltin, Leonard (1987). Of Mice and Magic: A History of American Animated Cartoons (Revised ed.). Plume. ISBN 0-452-25993-2.
