= Mister Magoo's Christmas Carol =

1962 animated musical holiday television special

- 2004 DVD cover
- Based on: A Christmas Carol by Charles Dickens
- Written by: Barbara Chain
- Directed by: Abe Levitow
- Voices of: Jim Backus; Morey Amsterdam; Jack Cassidy; Royal Dano; Paul Frees
- Composer: Jule Styne / Bob Merrill
- Country of origin: United States
- Original language: English

Production
- Producers: Lee Orgel; Henry G. Saperstein
- Running time: 53 minutes
- Production company: United Productions of America

Original release
- Network: NBC
- Release: December 18, 1962

Mister Magoo's Christmas Carol is a 1962 American animated musical holiday television special produced by UPA. It is an adaptation of Charles Dickens' 1843 novella A Christmas Carol, and it features UPA's character Mr. Magoo as Ebenezer Scrooge. The special first aired on December 18, 1962, on NBC and was the first animated Christmas special to be produced specifically for television.

Jim Backus provides the voice of Magoo, with additional voices provided by Paul Frees, Morey Amsterdam, Joan Gardner, and Jack Cassidy. The special is directed by Abe Levitow and features songs composed by Jule Styne, with lyrics by Bob Merrill, while Walter Scharf arranged and conducted the orchestral score.

== Plot ==
Mr. Magoo is heading to a theater on Broadway, where he is starring as Ebenezer Scrooge in a musical production based on A Christmas Carol. Due to Magoo's nearsightedness, he arrives 30 minutes late and accidentally injures the director ("It's Great to Be Back on Broadway").

Scrooge is a miserly money lender in Victorian London on Christmas Eve, counting money while his clerk Bob Cratchit is underpaid and has no coal for his fire ("Ringle, Ringle"). After rudely refusing two men who ask him for a donation to charity, Scrooge reluctantly allows Cratchit to take the holiday off. Scrooge goes home and gets ready for bed, but is visited by the ghost of his business partner Jacob Marley, who has been dead for seven years. Marley is bound in heavy chains due to his misdeeds in life and warns Scrooge that he risks the same fate unless he heeds the advice of three spirits who will visit him over the course of the night.

The Ghost of Christmas Present visits Scrooge first and takes him to observe Cratchit and his family, who are counting their blessings despite their poor situation ("The Lord's Bright Blessing"). The Ghost warns Scrooge that Cratchit's young son Tiny Tim, who is sickly, will not survive to next Christmas if things do not change.

The Ghost of Christmas Past visits Scrooge next and takes him back to his boyhood, where Scrooge was a lonely schoolboy ("Alone in the World"). The Ghost also shows him Belle, a woman whom Scrooge, as a young man, had been courting; the moments he sees are those in which she sadly explains that she is leaving him due to his greed for money ("Winter Was Warm").

Scrooge encounters the Ghost of Christmas Yet-to-Come and is shown a vision of the future, where an unloved man has recently died. Scrooge sees his charwoman, his laundress, and the local undertaker sell his belongings to a fence named Old Joe ("We're Despicable (Plunderer's March)"). Scrooge begs to be shown "tenderness connected with death", but discovers that Tiny Tim has died. The Ghost takes Scrooge to a cemetery and shows him his own grave, revealing that this deceased man is him. Scrooge realizes in anguish that he has spent his life poorly, and repents ("Alone in the World (Reprise)").

Scrooge awakens on Christmas morning with a renewed purpose. He meets the two men from the previous day and makes a generous donation, then anonymously sends Cratchit a Christmas turkey. He later visits Cratchit to give him a raise in pay and help nurse Tiny Tim back to health, and shares Christmas together with them ("The Lord's Bright Blessing (Reprise)").

The musical concludes and the audience applauds. Magoo brings the director out on stage, but the stage's props, lights and scenery fall on him. Magoo proudly exclaims "Oh, Magoo, you've done it again, and by George, I've brought down the house!" and wishes both his audience and the television audience a Merry Christmas.

== Cast ==
- Jim Backus as Mr. Magoo/Ebenezer Scrooge
  - Marie Matthews as young Ebenezer Scrooge, Cratchit Daughter (singing)
- Morey Amsterdam as Brady, James
- Jack Cassidy as Bob Cratchit, Dick Wilkins
- Royal Dano as Jacob Marley, Old Joe (singing)
- Paul Frees as Charity Man, Fezziwig, Old Joe (speaking), the Undertaker, Stage Director
- Joan Gardner as Tiny Tim, Ghost of Christmas Past, Charwoman
- John Hart as Billings, Stage Manager, Milkman
- Jane Kean as Belle
- Laura Olsher as Mrs. Cratchit, Laundress, Cratchit Daughter (speaking), Peter Cratchit, Turkey Boy
- Les Tremayne as Ghost of Christmas Present

== Songs ==
1. "It's Great to Be Back on Broadway"
2. "It's Great to Be Back on Broadway (Reprise)"
3. "Ringle, Ringle"
4. "The Lord's Bright Blessing"
5. "Alone in the World"
6. "Winter Was Warm"
7. "We're Despicable (Plunderer's March)"
8. "Alone in the World (Reprise)"
9. "Ringle, Ringle (Reprise)"
10. "The Lord's Bright Blessing (Reprise)"
11. "Winter Was Warm (End Credits)"

== Background ==
Mister Magoo's Christmas Carol was produced by UPA in its last days as an animation studio, following its acquisition by Henry G. Saperstein. UPA later produced a television series titled The Famous Adventures of Mr. Magoo, in which Magoo portrayed other literary characters. The series ended soon after as UPA was unable to mass-produce cartoons for television. It fills an hour-long time slot, as opposed to half an hour, which is different from most animated Christmas specials.

The special depicts the visits of the ghosts in a different order than the book, with the Ghost of Christmas Present appearing before Past. Tiny Tim resembles UPA's character Gerald McBoing-Boing and Jacob Marley resembles Worcestershire, a character from Mister Magoo.

The special was rerun on NBC throughout the Christmas season until 1969. Throughout the 1970s and 1980s, it aired on local stations in syndication during the Christmas season, in the 1990s, it aired on the Disney Channel and USA Network, and in the 2000s, it aired on Cartoon Network with the entire song "Winter Was Warm" removed ("The Lord's Bright Blessing" replaced its reprised version for the end credits) and other sequences trimmed for time. Me-TV brought it back to broadcast television in 2011. NBC aired the special again in 2012, with scenes depicting Magoo in the framing device cut in order to make room for commercials. The CW subsequently acquired the broadcast rights to the special; the original special aired in its entirety in 2014, but the NBC version aired the following year. Distribution rights to the special are currently held by NBCUniversal Television Distribution following parent company Comcast's acquisition of its holder Classic Media, which was renamed DreamWorks Classics.

When it premiered on Freeform on December 13, 2022, several sequences were edited out, including the song "We're Despicable (Plunderers' March)" and Magoo & Cratchett's duet on "Ringle Ringle".

== Home media ==
The special was first released on VHS, Betamax, and LaserDisc in 1982 by Paramount Home Video on behalf of UPA. The VHS was re-released in 1988 and 1994. The special later made its DVD debut in 2001 by Goodtimes Home Video and had multiple re-releases on the format. On November 16, 2010, it was released on Blu-ray. Most media are labeled as "Mr. Magoo," though many online resources spell out his name as "Mister Magoo."

== Reception ==
Thomas Vinciguerra for The New York Times praised the special and gave it a 4.5 out of 5, saying "not merely a superior musical version, it is a pioneer among animated Christmas traditions."

== In popular culture ==
Clips from the special were seen on television monitors in Scrooged.

Animal Collective's 2000 debut album Spirit They're Gone, Spirit They've Vanished is named for one of Scrooge's lines in the special.

In the Hill Street Blues episode "Santaclaustrophobia" a clip is seen playing on the television in Sgt. Mick Belker's apartment.

The special was parodied as "Mr. McGrew's Christmas Carol" in The Simpsons 2003 episode "'Tis the Fifteenth Season".

The special was shown in the Christmas movie Surviving Christmas.

In the 2001 pilot episode of Six Feet Under, Claire Fisher (Lauren Ambrose) watches a clip from the special.

In the 1988 Christmas episode of the television series The Wonder Years, set in 1968, Kevin sees a bank of color TV sets all displaying a scene from the special.

== Stage adaptation ==
In 2014, the Actors Fund produced a one night only semi-staged live adaptation of the special at the Gerald W. Lynch Theater at John Jay College. Among the cast included Douglas Sills as Scrooge, Joshua Henry as Bob Cratchit, and Betsy Wolfe as Belle. Musical direction was by John McDaniel, who helped adapt Walter Scharf's original orchestrations. Five years later, the Actors Fund once again staged the show at the same theater, this time with Gavin Lee as Scrooge, Clifton Duncan as Bob Cratchit, and Sierra Boggess as Belle.

== See also ==
- List of American films of 1962
- List of A Christmas Carol adaptations
- List of Christmas films
- List of ghost films
- List of animated feature films
