= Henry G. Saperstein =

American film producer

- Born: Henry Gahagen Sapirstein; 2 June 1918; Chicago, Illinois, United States
- Died: 24 June 1998 (aged 80); Beverly Hills, California, United States
- Spouse: Irene Saperstein

Henry Gahagen Saperstein (June 2, 1918 – June 24, 1998) was an American film producer and distributor.

== Biography ==
The son of Aaron Saperstein and Beatrice Pearl Saperstein, Henry's father owned five independent cinemas in Chicago. Henry was educated at the University of Chicago where he majored in mathematics. When Henry was 20, his father died, leading Henry to drop out of school to run the cinemas. With the wartime boom in cinema going, Henry bought some more cinemas in 1943.

Sensing the demise of cinema attendance and the rise of television, Saperstein acquired the rights to several Westerns featuring Gene Autry and Hopalong Cassidy and Walter Lantz cartoons for his Chicago based Hollywood Toy Television Corporation a toy electric television that showed six minute cartoons or sequences from films.

He moved to Hollywood in 1955 as the president of Television Personalities Inc that specialised in tie-in merchandising business for television characters such as The Life and Legend of Wyatt Earp, The Lone Ranger, Lassie and The Roy Rogers Show. He worked with Col. Tom Parker as Elvis Presley's licensing agent as well as creating and selling licensed merchandise for other stars such as Debbie Reynolds, Rosemary Clooney, Chubby Checker and the Three Stooges.

Henry Saperstein produced syndicated television sports shows such as Championship Bowling (1958–60) and All Star Golf (1958-62) as well as the children's television show Ding Dong School that began in Chicago.

== UPA ==
Saperstein purchased the UPA (United Productions of America) studio from its co-founder, Stephen Bosustow, in 1960, following the unsuccessful release of the Mr. Magoo feature film 1001 Arabian Nights (1959). Through his UPA studio, Saperstein curtailed industrial film production and produced the successful Mr. Magoo television series. He followed it with The Dick Tracy Show which brought the popularity of The Untouchables TV series to children with a host of tie-in merchandising. Bosustow felt that Saperstein mainly purchased the studio to exploit the merchandising of Magoo.

Saperstein produced the television special Mr. Magoo's Christmas Carol (1962) written by Barbara Chain with music by Bob Merrill and Jule Styne which won the New York Critic's Award, and The Famous Adventures of Mr. Magoo (1964–65) television series which it spawned, as well as the animated feature Gay Purr-ee (1962).

== Toho American releases ==
At UPA, Saperstein was approached by marketers looking for theatrical monster films. Saperstein met with the Motion Picture Association of America to find out which company made the most monster films. He was told the most prolific were Hammer Studios in England and Toho Studios in Japan. As Hammer already had American distributors, Saperstein formed a relationship with Toho and arranged for U.S. actors to appear in such films as Invasion of Astro-Monster and Frankenstein vs. Baragon (both starring Nick Adams), and The War of the Gargantuas (with Russ Tamblyn).

During the mid-'60s spy craze, Saperstein acquired the rights to a Japanese James Bond-type film Kokusai himitsu keisatsu: Kagi no kagi. When American preview audiences laughed at the film, Saperstein had the idea to hire comedian Lenny Bruce to write alternative comedy dialogue for the film for a group of actors to dub the original actors. When Bruce refused the project, Saperstein hired Woody Allen for the project that was originally meant to be a television special, but was expanded for cinema release with padding by the musical group The Lovin' Spoonful. The resulting film would be titled What's Up, Tiger Lily?

He continued to produce a variety of films and television shows such as T.A.M.I. Show and was an executive producer on the 1968 feature film Hell in the Pacific.

== Death ==
He died of cancer in Beverly Hills, California on June 24, 1998 at age 80.
