= Magoo's Puddle Jumper =

- Directed by: Pete Burness
- Story by: Dick Shaw
- Produced by: Stephen Bosustow
- Starring: Jim Backus; Daws Butler (uncredited)
- Music by: Dean Elliott
- Animation by: Rudy Larriva; Barney Posner; Cecil Surry; Gil Turner
- Layouts by: Robert Dranko
- Backgrounds by: Bob McIntosh
- Color process: Technicolor
- Production company: UPA
- Distributed by: Columbia Pictures
- Release date: July 26, 1956
- Running time: 6 minutes
- Country: United States
- Language: English

Magoo's Puddle Jumper is a 1956 animated short produced by UPA for Columbia Pictures. Directed by Pete Burness and produced by Stephen Bosustow, Magoo's Puddle Jumper won the 1957 Oscar for Short Subjects (Cartoons).

== Summary ==
The cartoon follows the misadventures of the myopic Mr. Magoo alongside nephew Waldo as he drives a new electric car into the ocean.
