= The Dover Boys at Pimento University =

1942 film by Charles M. Jones

The Dover Boys at Pimento University; or, The Rivals of Roquefort Hall
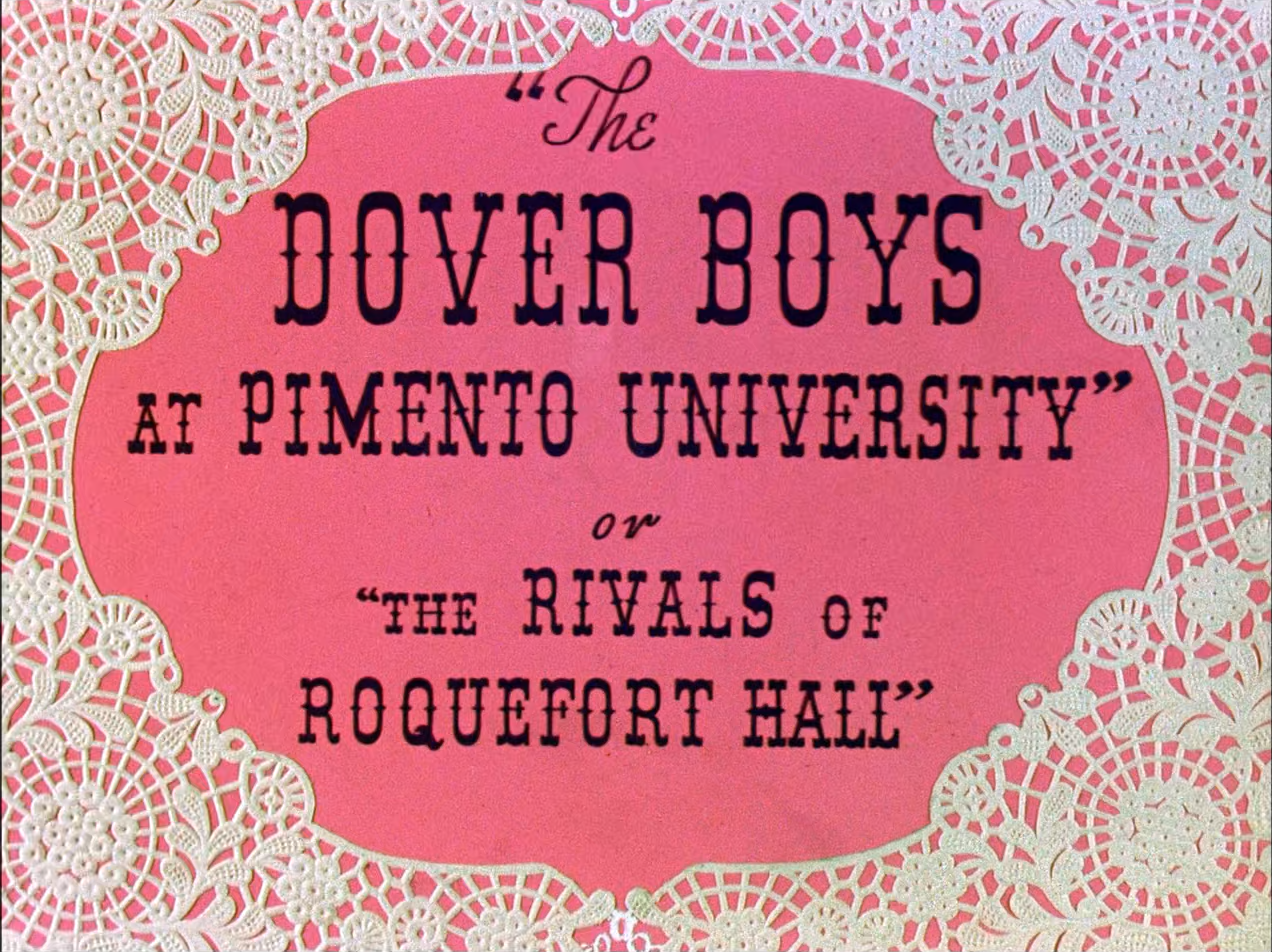
- Title card
- Directed by: Charles M. Jones
- Story by: Ted Pierce
- Based on: The Rover Boys by Edward Stratemeyer
- Produced by: Leon Schlesinger
- Music by: Carl W. Stalling
- Animation by: Robert Cannon
- Color process: Technicolor
- Production company: Leon Schlesinger Productions
- Distributed by: Warner Bros. Pictures
- Release date: September 10, 1942
- Running time: 8 min
- Country: United States
- Language: English

The Dover Boys at Pimento University; or, The Rivals of Roquefort Hall (also known as The Dover Boys) is a 1942 American animated comedy short film directed by Charles M. Jones. The short was released on September 10, 1942. It is part of the Merrie Melodies series. Its plot is a parody of the Rover Boys, a popular juvenile fiction book series of the early 20th century. The cartoon is considered to be one of Jones' best work and one of the greatest cartoons of all time.

It is one of the first cartoons to make extensive use of limited animation, as well as other techniques that would only be more broadly popularized in the 1950s. Animation historian Michael Barrier writes: "Is The Dover Boys the first 'modern' cartoon? …Chuck Jones stylized the animation in this cartoon in a way that anticipated what several consciously modern studios like UPA would be doing a decade later."

The short entered the public domain in 1970, due to United Artists, the rights holder of the short at the time, failing to renew the copyright by that year. In 1994, the cartoon was voted No. 49 of The 50 Greatest Cartoons of all time by members of the animation field.

== Plot ==
The full cartoon

The scene opens upon Pimento University ("good old P.U."), and the school anthem is sung in a 1910s barbershop style, to the tune of "O Genevieve, Sweet Genevieve". The narrator then introduces the three Dover brothers: athletic oldest brother Tom, thin middle child Dick, and portly, curly-haired youngest brother Larry. "A gay outing at the park has been planned by the merry trio, and they are off to fetch 'their' fiancée, dainty Dora Standpipe, at Miss Cheddar's Female Academy, close by."

The Dover Boys are watched by the nefarious Dan Backslide. "The former sneak of Roquefort Hall", his feelings for Dora are summed up in his comment, "How I love her! … (father's money!)" Backslide then steals a conveniently placed, unoccupied runabout, which he uses to kidnap an oblivious Dora while she and the Dover Boys are playing hide-and-seek, spiriting her away to a remote mountain hunting lodge (but not before letting her call out for help from The Dover Boys). However, Backslide soon discovers that, despite appearances, Dora is anything but dainty; she proceeds to administer a sound thrashing to Backslide, all the while acting the damsel in distress—crying for help and pounding on the door (with the locks on her side), beating Backslide so badly that he himself begins crying out for help from the Dover Boys.

"An alert young scout" witnesses Dora's captivity, and sends a distress signal via semaphore, which reaches the Dover Boys via telegram. The Dover Boys race to the scene, and punch the barely conscious Backslide. Just as the boys prepare to punch Backslide again, he collapses to the floor, and they accidentally punch each other unconscious at the same time, falling on top of Backslide in a stack. Dora is then escorted away by an odd grey-bearded man in a nineteenth-century bathing suit and sailor's cap who was a running gag throughout the cartoon, appearing periodically to interrupt the story by shuffling across the screen to the tune of Ed Haley's "While Strolling Through the Park One Day". He and Dora proceed to shuffle off into the sunset as the cartoon concludes with a silent film-era iris out.

== Production ==
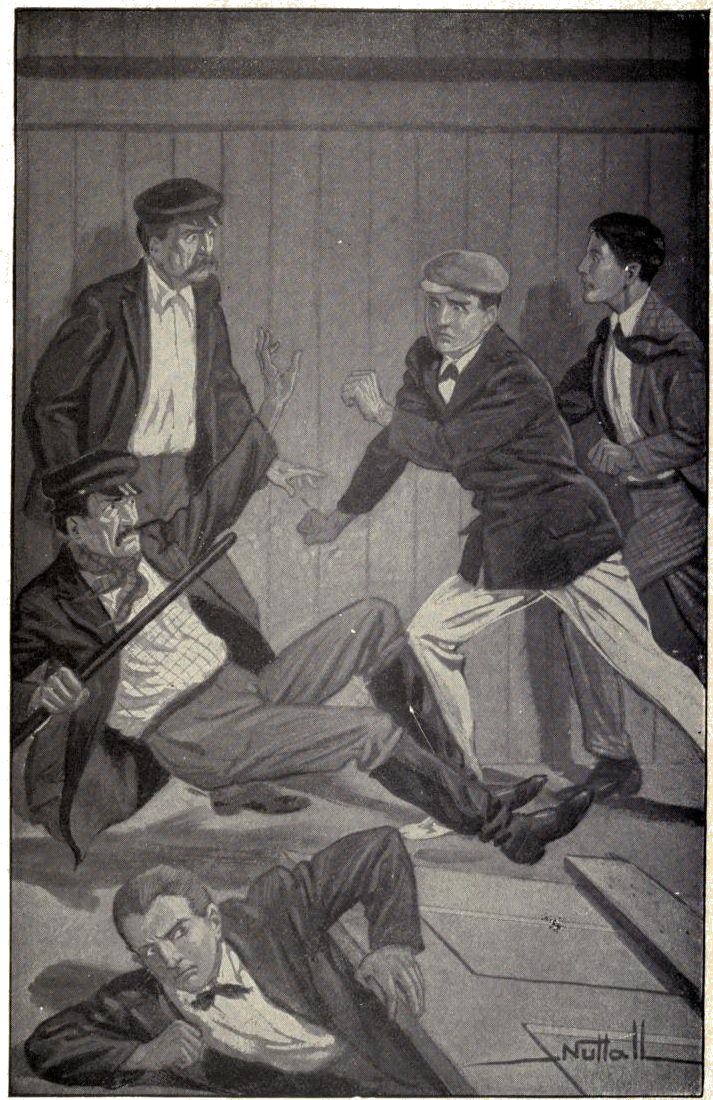
The cartoon was a parody of 1910s book series The Rover Boys; above is an illustration from The Rover Boys in Southern Waters.

In 1942, Leon Schlesinger and Warner Bros. studio executives had become increasingly dissatisfied with the cartoons directed by Chuck Jones, whose slow pacing and Disney-esque direction had become out of step with the rest of the studio's output. Jones was ordered to make cartoons that were more in-line with the other studio directors, starting with the Merrie Melodies short The Draft Horse earlier that year. Animation historians considered The Dover Boys to be Jones' true turning point as a director as he was able to fully transition away from his earlier directorial style.

According to Jones, Schlesinger and the studio executives were still less than pleased when they screened The Dover Boys because of the extensive use of limited animation and drybrush smears, and the executives went through the process of attempting to fire him. A replacement for Jones could not be easily found due to labor shortages stemming from World War II, so he kept his job. The short is one of the earliest examples of limited animation being used, and was "wholly unlike the animation of contemporary films".

From time to time throughout the cartoon, the Boys lapse into various renditions of their alma mater, bearing resemblance to "The Rose of No Man's Land" and George Cooper and Henry Tucker's "Sweet Genevieve": "Pimento U, Oh sweet P.U., thy fragrant odor scents the air".

The cartoon is filled with puns on the Rover Boys series: the occurrences of the names Pimento, Cheddar, and Roquefort reflect the Rover Boys' old school of Colby Hall; Tom, Dick and Larry borrow their names from Tom, Sam and Dick Rover (as well as the generic names Tom, Dick and Harry), Dora Standpipe is named after Tom Rover's fiancée Dora Stanhope, and Dan Backslide is named after Rover Boys villain Dan Baxter.

Although voice credits from Warner Bros. cartoons are not easy to find beyond Mel Blanc (who, using more or less his normal voice, portrays Dan Backslide and the telegram delivery boy), animation historian Michael Barrier has stated that John McLeish voiced the part of the narrator (he performed a similar role as the stately, unctuous narrator on several Goofy shorts for the Disney studio). The voice of Tom Dover was performed by long-time Schlesinger writer Tedd Pierce, who also provided the story. Vocal harmonies were provided by The Sportsmen Quartet from Jack Benny's radio program. Dora was voiced by Marjorie Tarlton. Dan Backslide's character design was a caricature of Jones' animator Ken Harris.

The cartoon's distinct limited animation style, and its abstract/modern art influenced layouts by John McGrew and backgrounds by Gene Fleury and Bernyce Polifka, would be adopted as elements of the house style for the United Productions of America (UPA) studio. Several animators and artists who worked on this short, including Robert Cannon, Rudy Larriva, Fleury, and Polifka, would later work at UPA.

== Legacy ==
The Dover Boys was a rare case of a cartoon that was copied/succeeded by other animation studios. In 1943, John Hubley and Paul Sommer would direct The Rocky Road to Ruin, a Color Rhapsody cartoon produced by Screen Gems for Columbia Pictures. The short notably mirrors settings and designs that were created for The Dover Boys, with John McLeish even reprising his role as the narrator. Later in 1948, UPA would also release a cartoon entitled The Rover Boys in Peril exclusively for the United States Navy, which McLeish and animator Robert Cannon also worked on.

The characters Tom, Dick, and Larry later made cameo appearances (voiced respectively by Jon Bauman, Jeff Bennett and Rob Paulsen) on the 1990s Fox and WB network series Animaniacs, alongside Slappy Squirrel in "Frontier Slappy", while singing discrediting lyrics about Daniel Boone (voiced by Jim Cummings) until they get fired by him; the Warners in "Magic Time"; and in Wakko's Wish. A short clip of this cartoon is featured in the opening credits of "Less Than Hero", an episode of another Fox TV show, Futurama. They also appeared cheering in the stands late in the 1996 animation/live-action movie Space Jam. A segment of the cartoon is featured briefly in an episode of Agent Carter where it is used as part of a subliminal messaging tool of the Black Widow program.

Van Partible, creator of the television series Johnny Bravo, acknowledged a debt to Robert Cannon's limited animation in The Dover Boys. specifically the villain's monologue where Cannon used "a sort of smear technique, you go pose to pose, doing three in-betweens on ones."

With the advent of the Internet, the short gained newfound attention from younger generations, in part because it is one of the few Warner Bros. shorts from that era that fell into the public domain, although it has seen releases from MGM/UA Home Video and Warner Home Video.

In 2018, to mark the short's 76th anniversary, a collaborative effort of over 90 independent animators recreated the short scene for scene with each animator drawing in their own style. The reanimated collaboration, titled "The Dover Boys Reanimated Collab!", was curated by animator Josh "Zeurel" Palmer and was released on August 27, 2018, on YouTube, receiving over three million views.

== See also ==
- Looney Tunes and Merrie Melodies filmography (1940–1949)
- List of animated films in the public domain in the United States
