= When Magoo Flew =

- Theatrical Poster for When Magoo Flew
- Directed by: Pete Burness
- Story by: Barbara Hammer; Tedd Pierce
- Produced by: Stephen Bosustow
- Starring: Jim Backus
- Music by: Hoyt Curtin
- Animation by: Rudy Larriva; Tom McDonald; Cecil Surry
- Layouts by: Sterling Sturtevant
- Backgrounds by: Bob McIntosh
- Color process: Technicolor, CinemaScope
- Production company: UPA
- Distributed by: Columbia Pictures
- Release date: January 6, 1955
- Running time: 6 minutes
- Language: English

When Magoo Flew is a 1955 animated short produced by UPA for Columbia Pictures. Directed by Pete Burness and produced by Stephen Bosustow, When Magoo Flew won the 1955 Oscar for Short Subjects (Cartoons). In addition, it was the first UPA short to be made for the CinemaScope widescreen format. When Magoo Flew is also the title of a 2012 book by Adam Abraham on the history of the UPA studio.

== Plot summary ==
Near-sighted Mr. Magoo goes to see a movie but instead mistakes the airport across the street for the theater and takes a seat on a departing airplane. This cartoon makes reference to the 3D movies that briefly became popular around the time of the release of this short as Magoo comments on the apparent realism of his movie experience ("It's like I can actually feel the plane taking off!") The man in the seat next to Magoo turns out to be a bank robber who flees without his briefcase (full of stolen money) when he sees a policeman talking with the stewardess. Magoo politely tries to find the robber so he can return his briefcase, stepping out into what he believes is the theater lobby (actually the wing of the plane).

After startling many of the other passengers due to his apparent lack of concern of the danger to his life as he wanders on the outside of the plane, the pilot opens up the cargo bay door so Magoo can get back inside. Promptly finding the robber, Magoo returns his briefcase and keys the policeman onto the identity of the robber. After the plane lands, Magoo comments to the stewardess that he thoroughly enjoyed watching his first 3D movie. The only thing that bothered Magoo was that there was no cartoon before the movie. The closing gag is a particularly sly one as Magoo describes himself when describing his favorite cartoon character (the narcissist).
