= 1001 Arabian Nights (1959 film) =

1959 film

- Original theatrical poster
- Directed by: Jack Kinney
- Written by: Dick Shaw; Dick Kinney; Leo Salkin; Pete Burness; Lew Keller; Ed Nofziger; Ted Allen; Margaret Schneider; Paul Schneider
- Based on: One Thousand and One Nights by Czenzi Ormonde
- Produced by: Stephen Bosustow
- Starring: Jim Backus; Kathryn Grant; Dwayne Hickman; Hans Conried; Herschel Bernardi; Alan Reed; Daws Butler; The Clark Sisters
- Music by: George Duning
- Production company: UPA
- Distributed by: Columbia Pictures
- Release date: December 1, 1959
- Running time: 75 minutes
- Country: United States
- Language: English
- Budget: $2 million

1001 Arabian Nights is a 1959 American animated comedy film produced by United Productions of America (UPA) and distributed by Columbia Pictures. Released to theaters on December 1, 1959, the film is a loose adaptation of the Arab folktale of "Aladdin" from One Thousand and One Nights, albeit with the addition of UPA's star cartoon character, Mr. Magoo, to the story as Aladdin's uncle, "Abdul Azziz Magoo". It is the first animated feature to be released by Columbia Pictures.

== Plot ==
In a distant Middle Eastern kingdom, the young Aladdin lives with his nearsighted and stubborn uncle, Abdul Azziz Magoo, who owns a lamp shop. Believing that Aladdin is growing up to be a lazy and irresponsible man, Magoo encourages Aladdin to get married.

Meanwhile, the wizard Wazir has been siphoning money from the royal treasury and manages to persuade the now-bankrupt Sultan to ask his daughter, the Princess Yasminda, to marry the richest man in the land, which now happens to be Wazir.

During a royal procession, Aladdin and Yasminda fall in love. In his quest for absolute power, Wazir seeks the genie of the magic lamp, which is sealed in a magic cave, and needs Aladdin to get it for him. However, he is unable to obtain the lamp after it falls back into the cave with Aladdin still inside. Aladdin meets the genie and escapes the cave with a chestful of treasures. Magoo then takes the treasure to the palace as a dowry and manages to unintentionally spoil Wazir and Yasminda's wedding with his naïveté and nearsightedness.

The genie conjures a palace and wealth for Aladdin, which is enough to persuade the Sultan to agree to let Yasminda marry him, but the vengeful Wazir manages to steal the lamp and the allegiance of the genie, thus exposing Aladdin as a fraud. Aladdin is sent to the scaffold.

As Wazir kidnaps and attempts to woo Yasminda back, the clueless Magoo inadvertently manages to obtain the lamp from Wazir and thus the allegiance of the genie, while also managing to dodge all of Wazir's attempts to kill him. Wazir falls into the sea and is devoured by sharks. Only wanting the best for his nephew, Magoo wishes for Aladdin and Yasminda to live happily ever after; thus, the genie saves Aladdin from execution and he and Yasminda wed.

== Voice cast ==
- Jim Backus as Uncle Abdul Azziz Magoo
- Kathryn Grant as Princess Yasminda
- Dwayne Hickman as Aladdin
- Hans Conried as the Wicked Wazir
- Herschel Bernardi as the Jinni of the Lamp
- Alan Reed as the Sultan
- Daws Butler as Omar the Rugmaker
- The Clark Sisters as the Three Little Maids from Damascus

=== Uncredited ===
- Daws Butler - The Royal Accountant, Heralds
- Hans Conried - Magic Flame

== Production ==
The film was originally directed by Pete Burness, who was the series director on the popular series of Mr. Magoo theatrical cartoons produced for Columbia by UPA between 1949 and 1959. Disagreements with producer and UPA owner Stephen Bosustow led to Burness resigning and Bosustow recruiting Jack Kinney, the director of many of Disney's Goofy cartoons, as the film's new director. The voice of Magoo in the short cartoons, Jim Backus, reprises his role in the feature, with Kathryn Grant, the singer/actress wife of Bing Crosby, as the voice of Princess Yasminda, and Dwayne Hickman, from TV's The Bob Cummings Show and The Many Loves of Dobie Gillis, as the voice of Aladdin.

1001 Arabian Nights was the first full-length feature produced by UPA, a studio which had revolutionized animation during the 1950s by incorporating design and limited animation. The film was not a box-office success, and was UPA's final release through Columbia, which had ended its distribution for the UPA short subjects in favor of lower-cost Loopy De Loop cartoons from Hanna-Barbera Productions. Following the film's release, Bousustow sold UPA to Henry G. Saperstein, who moved the studio into television production and a second feature production, Gay Purr-ee, before closing the animation studio and moving UPA on to other ventures.

== Home video ==
1001 Arabian Nights was released on VHS videocassette by RCA/Columbia Pictures Home Video in 1985. It was released on DVD in 2011 as a manufactured-on-demand release from the Sony Pictures Choice Collection, now available through Warner Archive.

In 2014, 1001 Arabian Nights was included as disc four of the four-disc DVD boxed set Mr. Magoo: The Theatrical Collection 1949-1959 from Shout! Factory.

In 2018, 1001 Arabian Nights was included in the compilation A Thousand and One Nights: The Story of Aladdin - 8 Magical Tales from Mill Creek Entertainment.

== See also ==
- List of American films of 1959
