= Abe Levitow =

American animator (1922–1975)

- Born: Abraham Levitow; July 2, 1922; Los Angeles, California, United States
- Died: May 8, 1975 (aged 52); Hollywood, California
- Resting place: Eden Memorial Park Cemetery
- Education: Chouinard Art Institute
- Occupation: Animator
- Years active: 1940–1975
- Employer(s): Leon Schlesinger Productions (1940-1944); Warner Bros. Cartoons (1944-1962); United Productions of America (1958-1970); MGM Animation/Visual Arts (1962-1970); Richard Williams Studios (1970-1975)
- Spouse: Charlotte Winniferd Lewis
- Children: Roberta Levitow, Judy Levitow and Jon Levitow
- Website: www.abelevitow.com

Abraham Levitow (July 2, 1922 – May 8, 1975) was an American animator who worked at Warner Bros. Cartoons, UPA and MGM Animation/Visual Arts. He is best known for his work under Chuck Jones' direction.

== Career ==
Levitow was born in Los Angeles, California to William Levitow and Sarah Schlafmitz who were Polish Jews that immigrated to the United States due to the upsurge of anti-Semitism in Eastern Europe. He began working as an in-betweener and assistant animator at Warner Bros. Cartoons in 1940 at the age of 17. Levitow briefly left Warner Brothers when he was drafted during World War II working on training films, during which time he met Stan Lee and became close friends with him. Levitow returned to Warners, working as an assistant animator for Ken Harris in the Chuck Jones unit. He was later promoted to animator in 1950 and would receive his first animations credit in 1953 for the cartoon Wild Over You. He worked steadily for Jones over the remainder of the 1950s, and directed several cartoons for release in 1959, including the Pepé Le Pew cartoon "Really Scent". While working under Jones, he made characters' joints more angular than most other animators. Those characters with fur (Wile E. Coyote and Claude Cat, for example) looked especially shaggy in Levitow's scenes. Some of Levitow's most distinctive work came within a few years of his promotion to director -- he animated the first minute of What's Opera, Doc? and a laughing Porky Pig in Robin Hood Daffy.

Levitow joined UPA in 1958 to work on the Mr. Magoo feature 1001 Arabian Nights, staying behind even after the studio was sold to Henry G. Saperstein. In 1962, he directed the first feature-length animated television special, Mr. Magoo's Christmas Carol. 1962 also saw the release of his theatrical feature Gay Purr-ee, with the voices of Robert Goulet, Judy Garland, and others. By 1962, he was working with Jones at MGM as an animator and a director in the Tom and Jerry series. He co-directed the feature film The Phantom Tollbooth with Chuck Jones at MGM. In addition, he worked with UPA on more Mr. Magoo cartoons, including The Famous Adventures of Mr. Magoo, and also collaborated with Chuck again on the program Curiosity Shop through Format Films. He animated on the Chuck Jones-produced A Christmas Carol, directed by Richard Williams at Williams' London studio in 1971.

In 1972, he and producer Dave Hanson founded Levitow/Hanson Films. The studio produced several animated pieces for Sesame Street, the most notable being Willie Wimple. His last completed project was B.C.: The First Thanksgiving, which aired in November of 1973.

At the time of his death on May 8, 1975, Levitow was in line to direct the animated feature film Raggedy Ann & Andy: A Musical Adventure. The project was taken over by Richard Williams when Levitow died from a bone tumor during pre-production at the age of 52.

He was buried at Eden Memorial Park Cemetery.
