= Mister Magoo =

- Genre: Comedy
- Created by: Stephen Bosustow
- Voices of: Jim Backus; Mel Blanc; Jerry Hausner; Benny Rubin; Paul Frees; Frank Nelson
- Country of origin: United States
- Original language: English
- No. of seasons: 1
- No. of episodes: 26 (130 segments)

Production
- Executive producers: Henry J. Saperstein; Peter DeMet
- Producer: Glan Heisch
- Running time: 5 minutes
- Production company: United Productions of America

Original release
- Network: First-run syndication
- Release: November 7, 1960 – February 2, 1962

Mister Magoo is an American animated television series which was produced from November 7, 1960 to February 2, 1962. Each episode includes five four-minute shorts and was either aired together with bumpers as a single half-hour show, or was split up with one short airing each weekday, along with other cartoons. It was produced by United Productions of America. The series' voices were Jim Backus, Mel Blanc, Jerry Hausner, Benny Rubin, Paul Frees, and Frank Nelson.

The show was followed by two related series: the 1964–65 show The Famous Adventures of Mr. Magoo and the 1977 What's New, Mr. Magoo?

== Plot ==
The series follows the comic misadventures of Quincy Magoo, a wealthy, nearly blind senior citizen who consistently refuses to admit he has any vision problems. Driven by an overactive imagination, Magoo routinely mistakes dangerous situations, wild animals, and complex machinery for harmless, everyday things. While his cluelessness invariably triggers chaos and leaves the people around him—particularly his anxious nephew Waldo—to suffer the consequences, Magoo's sheer luck always pulls him through completely unharmed.

== Cast ==
- Jim Backus as Mr. Magoo
- Mel Blanc as Tycoon Magoo, Worcestershire, Additional voices
- Jerry Hausner as Waldo
- Daws Butler as Prezly
- Benny Rubin as Charlie
- Paul Frees as Additional voices
- Frank Nelson as Additional voices
- Bea Benaderet as Mother Magoo
- June Foray as Mother Magoo
- Julie Bennett as Millie, Additional voices
- Jean Vander Pyl as Madam Lafoo
- Herb Vigran as Mr. McCloy

== Episodes ==
No.	Title	Directed by	Written by
1	"Military Magoo"	Clyde Geronimi	George Atkins and Bob Ogle
2	"Magoo's Bear"	Clyde Geronimi	George Atkins and Bob Ogle
3	"Mis-Guided Missile"	Steve Clark	Al Bertino and Dick Kinney
4	"Requiem for a Bull"	John Walker	Dick Shaw and Dave Detiege
5	"Base on Bawls"	Steve Clark	Al Bertino and Dick Kinney
6	"Magoo Gets His Man"	Clyde Geronimi	George Atkins and Bob Ogle
7	"Thin Skinned Diver"	John Walker	Dick Shaw and Dave Detiege
8	"Martian Magoo"	Steve Clark	Al Bertino and Dick Kinney
9	"Pet Sitters"	Clyde Geronimi	George Atkins and Bob Ogle
10	"Robinson Crusoe Magoo"	Steve Clark	Al Bertino and Dick Kinney
11	"Rassle Hassle"	John Walker	Dick Shaw and Dave Detiege
12	"Fish 'n Tricks"	Steve Clark	Al Bertino and Dick Kinney
13	"Beatnik Magoo"	Clyde Geronimi	George Atkins and Bob Ogle
14	"Masquerader Magoo"	Steve Clark	Al Bertino and Dick Kinney
15	"Top the Music"	John Walker	Dick Shaw and Dave Detiege
16	"Eagle Eye Magoo"	Steve Clark	Al Bertino and Dick Kinney
17	"Fox Pass"	John Walker	Dick Shaw and Dave Detiege
18	"The Billionaire"	Clyde Geronimi	George Atkins and Bob Ogle
19	"Lost Vegas"	John Walker	Dick Shaw and Dave Detiege
20	"Mother's Cooking"	Clyde Geronimi	George Atkins and Bob Ogle
21	"Saddle Battle"	John Walker	Dick Shaw and Dave Detiege
22	"Mother's Little Helper"	Steve Clark	Al Bertino and Dick Kinney
23	"Double Trouble Double Trouble"	John Walker	Dick Shaw and Dave Detiege
24	"Top Pro Magoo"	Clyde Geronimi	George Atkins and Bob Ogle
25	"Bring 'Em Back Waldo"	John Walker	Dick Shaw and Dave Detiege
26	"Trees a Crowd"	Clyde Geronimi	George Atkins and Bob Ogle
27	"Beau Jest"	John Walker	Dick Shaw and Dave Detiege
28	"Shotgun Magoo"	Steve Clark	Al Bertino and Dick Kinney
29	"This Is the Life"	Steve Clark	Al Bertino and Dick Kinney
30	"The Real McGoys"	John Walker	Dick Shaw and Dave Detiege
31	"Night Club Magoo"	John Walker	Dick Shaw and Dave Detiege
32	"Sing Sing Fling"	Steve Clark	George Atkins
33	"South Pacific Potluck"	John Walker	Dick Shaw and Dave Detiege
34	"From Here to Fraternity"	Clyde Geronimi	Bob Ogle and Tony Benedict
35	"A Day at the Beach"	Ray Patterson	Al Bertino, Dick Kinney, and Tony Benedict
36	"High and Flighty"	John Walker	Dick Shaw and Tony Benedict
37	"The Vacuum Caper"	Steve Clark	Al Bertino and Dick Kinney
38	"The Reunion"	John Walker	Al Bertino, Dick Kinney, and Tony Benedict
39	"Go West Magoo"	John Walker	Dick Shaw and Tony Benedict
40	"People are a Scream"	Clyde Geronimi	George Atkins
41	"Insomniac Magoo"	Paul Fennell	Dave Detiege
42	"Magoo's Buggy"	Steve Clark	Dave Detiege
43	"Hermit's Hideaway"	Steve Clark	Bob Ogle
44	"High Spy Magoo"	Paul Fennell	George Atkins
45	"Soft Shoe Magoo"	Clyde Geronimi	Al Bertino, Dick Kinney, and Tony Benedict
46	"Cuckoo Magoo"	Paul Fennell	Dick Shaw
47	"Fuel in the Sun"	Clyde Geronimi	Bob Ogle and Tony Benedict
48	"Indoor Outing"	Steve Clark	Al Bertino and Dick Kinney
49	"Life Can Be Miserable"	John Walker	George Atkins and Tony Benedict
50	"Who's Lion"	Frank Smith	Al Bertino and Dick Kinney
51	"Magoo's Icebox"	Steve Clark	Nick George
52	"Lady in Black"	John Walker	Dick Shaw and Dave Detiege
53	"Foot Loose Moose"	John Walker	Dick Shaw
54	"Riding Hood Magoo"	Grant Simmons	George Atkins and Tony Benedict
55	"Record Breakers"	Paul Fennell	David Detiege and Tony Benedict
56	"Marshal Magoo"	Frank Smith	Bob Ogle
57	"Foxy Magoo"	Paul Fennell	David Detiege
58	"Hamlet on Rye"	John Walker	Dave Detiege and Tony Benedict
59	"Tycoonland"	Paul Fennell	Al Bertino, Dick Kinney, and Tony Benedict
60	"Night Fright"	Frank Smith	Bob Ogle
61	"Ten Strike Magoo"	John Walker	Nick George and Tony Benedict
62	"Food Feud"	Jerry Hathcock	Bob Ogle and Tony Benedict
63	"Angler Magoo"	Paul Fennell	Dave Detiege
64	"Magoo's Jackpot"	Steve Clark	Dick Shaw
65	"Magoo's Pets"	Steve Clark	Bob Ogle
66	"Magoo's Birthday Cake"	Steve Clark	Al Bertino and Dick Kinney
67	"Marco Magoo"	John Walker	George Atkins
68	"Three Ring Magoo"	Paul Fennell	Al Bertino and Dick Kinney
69	"Campaigner Magoo"	Frank Smith	Dick Shaw
70	"Magoo's Last Stand"	Steve Clark	Bob Ogle
71	"Fire Chief Magoo"	Paul Fennell	Dick Shaw
72	"Dangerous Dan Magoo"	Clyde Geronimi	Dave Detiege
73	"Maestro Magoo"	Frank Smith	George Atkins
74	"S'No Ball Magoo"	John Walker	Al Bertino and Dick Kinney
75	"Safety Magoo"	Grant Simmons	George Atkins
76	"Chug Chug Magoo"	Paul Fennell	Bob Ogle
77	"Slim Trim Magoo"	John Walker	Dick Shaw
78	"Magoo's Houseboy"	Clyde Geronimi	Al Bertino and Dick Kinney
79	"Magoo's Vacuum Cleaner"	Paul Fennell	Dick Shaw
80	"Magoo's Dog"	Steve Clark	Bob Ogle
81	"Goo Goo Magoo"	Ray Patterson	Dave Detiege
82	"Prince Charming Magoo"	Brad Case	Bob Ogle
83	"Magoo's Goal-Post"	Steve Clark	Dick Shaw
84	"Gasser Magoo"	John Walker	George Atkins
85	"Magoo's Caesar Solid"	Paul Fennell	Dave Detiege
86	"Buffalo Magoo"	John Walker	Al Bertino and Dick Kinney
87	"Cupid Magoo"	Frank Smith	George Atkins
88	"Hunter Magoo"	Grant Simmons	Ed Nofziger
89	"Goldilocks Magoo"	Brad Case	Bob Ogle
90	"Magoo's Hamster"	Paul Fennell	Bob Ogle
91	"Gangbuster Magoo"	Paul Fennell	George Atkins
92	"Magoo and Cholly"	Clyde Geronimi	Al Bertino and Dick Kinney
93	"Magoo's Safari Tale"	Clyde Geronimi	Al Bertino and Dick Kinney
94	"Magoo's TV Set"	Ray Patterson	Dave Detiege
95	"Magoo's Gnu"	Paul Fennell	Dave Detiege
96	"King Tut Magoo"	Brad Case	Al Bertino and Dick Kinney
97	"Perils of Magoo"	Paul Fennell	Al Bertino and Dick Kinney
98	"Speedway Magoo"	Clyde Geronimi	Dick Shaw
99	"Teenage Magoo"	Clyde Geronimi	Tedd Pierce and Bill Danch
100	"Fixit Magoo"	Steve Clark	Dick Shaw
101	"Hula Magoo"	Paul Fennell	Al Bertino and Dick Kinney
102	"Composer Magoo"	Grant Simmons	George Atkins
103	"Short Order Magoo"	John Walker	Dave Detiege
104	"Magoo Goes Shopping"	Paul Fennell	Dave Detiege
105	"Magoo at Blithering Heights"	Clyde Geronimi	Dick Shaw
106	"Robin Hood Magoo"	Steve Clark	Al Bertino and Dick Kinney
107	"Green Thumb Magoo"	Clyde Geronimi	Ralph Wright
108	"Lionhearted Magoo"	Clyde Geronimi	Bob Ogle
109	"Magoo Meets Frankenstein"	Gil Turner	Al Bertino, Ron Carver, and Dick Kinney
110	"Magoo and the Beanstalk"	Steve Clark	Bob Ogle
111	"Magoo's Western Exposure"	Steve Clark	Bob Ogle
112	"First Aid Magoo"	Steve Clark	Bob Ogle
113	"Magoo's Gorilla Friend"	Clyde Geronimi	Dick Shaw
114	"Bar-B-Q Magoo"	Steve Clark	Ralph Wright
115	"Magoo Meets McBoing Boing"	Abe Levitow	Ron Carver
116	"Buccaneer Magoo"	Clyde Geronimi	Al Bertino and Dick Kinney
117	"Magoo's Dutch Treat"	Clyde Geronimi	Ralph Wright
118	"Decorator Magoo"	Clyde Geronimi	Al Bertino and Dick Kinney
119	"Cast Iron Magoo"	Clyde Geronimi	Al Bertino and Dick Kinney
120	"Magoo's Surprise Party"	Steve Clark	Dick Shaw
121	"Piggy Bank Magoo"	Clyde Geronimi	Bob Ogle
122	"Yachtsman Magoo"	Steve Clark	Al Bertino and Dick Kinney
123	"Magoo's Roof Goof"	Clyde Geronimi	Ralph Wright
124	"Digger Magoo"	Steve Clark	Bob Ogle
125	"Magoo and the Medium"	Clyde Geronimi	Dick Shaw
126	"Skipper Magoo"	Clyde Geronimi	Dick Shaw
127	"Cyrano Magoo"	Steve Clark	Bob Ogle
128	"Private Eye Magoo"	Clyde Geronimi	Bob Ogle
129	"Magoo's Zoo Story"	Steve Clark	Ralph Wright
130	"Muscles Magoo"	Clyde Geronimi	Bob Ogle
