= Robert Cannon (animator) =

American animator and director (1909–1964)

- Born: Robert Franklin Cannon; July 16, 1909; Alliance, Ohio, US
- Died: June 9, 1964 (aged 54); Los Angeles, California, US
- Occupations: Animator, animated film director
- Years active: 1936–1964
- Employer(s): Leon Schlesinger Productions (1936–1944); United Productions of America (UPA) (1944–1946; 1949–1957); Walt Disney Productions (1946–1947); Metro-Goldwyn-Mayer (1947–1949)

Robert Franklin "Bobe" Cannon (July 16, 1909–June 9, 1964) was an American animator and film director. He is best known for his animation work at Leon Schlesinger Productions - later Warner Bros. Cartoons - and for his work as a director of both entertainment and industrial films at United Productions of America (UPA), the most influential animation studio of the 1950s.

== Life and career ==
Robert Franklin Cannon was born on July 16, 1909, in Alliance, Ohio.

Cannon joined Leon Schlesinger Productions, which produced the Looney Tunes and Merrie Melodies cartoons for Warner Bros. Pictures in 1936, and worked as an animator under Tex Avery, Bob Clampett, and Chuck Jones. Alongside Jones, Cannon moonlighted on the 1944 Franklin Roosevelt industrial film Hell-Bent for Election, produced by United Productions of America for the United Auto Workers labor union when it was still known as "Industrial Film and Poster Service."

Cannon left his job at Warners for UPA in 1945, becoming director under supervising director/producer John Hubley of the industrial film Brotherhood of Man (1945), an anti-racism short also commissioned by UAW. His most notable work at UPA is Gerald McBoing-Boing, a 1950 short he directed based upon a Dr. Seuss story, About a small boy who can only speak using sound effects instead of words, Gerald McBoing-Boing became both a popular commercial hit and a critical success for its innovative use of modern art design and limited animation.

In 1951, Gerald became the first of three UPA cartoons to win the Academy Award for Best Animated Short Film. His other notable UPA cartoons include Georgie and the Dragon (1950) and Christopher Crumpet (1953). Cannon also directed three sequel shorts to Gerald McBoing-Boing - Gerald McBoing-Boing's Symphony (1953), How Now Boing Boing (1954), and Gerald McBoing! Boing! on Planet Moo (1956) - and worked as a producer on UPA's short-lived The Gerald McBoing-Boing Show in 1956. The original 1950 film would be added in 1995 to the National Film Registry.

While at UPA, Cannon and UPA supervising producer/director John Hubley had a sometimes tumultuous working relationship. These troubles led Cannon to temporarily quit UPA in 1946, working briefly at the Disney and MGM animation studios before rejoining UPA in 1949 as a director and vice-president. In his later years, Cannon freelanced, taught at San Fernando Valley State College, and became a producer/director at animation company Playhouse Pictures for UPA alumnus Adrian Woolery after leaving UPA in 1957. As a freelancer, he worked for former UPA colleagues John Hubley and Faith Hubley as an animator on their 1959 short film Moonbird.

Cannon died of a heart attack on June 9, 1964 at the age of 54. He was posthumously honored with the Winsor McCay Award for Lifetime Achievement by the International Animated Film Society, ASIFA-Hollywood in 1976.
