= Pete Burness =

American animator and director (1904–1969)

Wilson David "Pete" Burness (June 16, 1904 – July 21, 1969) was an American animator and animation director. He was perhaps best known for his work on the Mr. Magoo series. He also contributed to the Tom and Jerry series, Looney Tunes, Merrie Melodies, and Rocky and His Friends.

== Biography ==
Burness was born in Los Angeles. His animation career began in 1930, working for Romer Grey and Ted Eshbaugh on Goofy Goat Antics and the unreleased Binko the Cub. In 1933 he transferred to Van Beuren Studios, where he animated the film adaptation of The Little King. Burness transferred to Harman-Ising Productions in 1936 and to the Metro-Goldwyn-Mayer cartoon department in 1938. He animated Tom and Jerry at MGM until 1947.

Burness worked briefly for Warner Bros. Cartoons in 1948 and 1949, animating a number of Looney Tunes and Merrie Melodies shorts, under Chuck Jones, Friz Freleng and Robert McKimson. He left Warner Bros. to become a director for United Productions of America, animating the popular Mr. Magoo series. Two of his Mr. Magoo shorts, When Magoo Flew (1954) and Mr. Magoo's Puddle Jumper (1956), won Academy Awards for Best Short Subject.

In 1958, Burness left UPA to join Jay Ward Productions as director of Rocky and his Friends and Hoppity Hooper. While working for Jay Ward he co-wrote and was hired to direct 1001 Arabian Nights, a feature film featuring Mr. Magoo. Following disputes with producer Stephen Bosustow, he left the project and was replaced by Jack Kinney.

Burness died of pancreatic cancer in 1969.

== Sources ==
- Lenburg, Jeff (2006), Who's who in Animated Cartoons: An International Guide to Film & Television's Award-winning and Legendary Animators, Hal Leonard Corporation, ISBN 978-1617746604
