= The Famous Adventures of Mr. Magoo =

- Genre: Animation
- Written by: Walter Black; Barbara Chain
- Directed by: Bob McKimson
- Voices of: Jim Backus; Marvin Miller; Paul Frees; Dal McKennon; Joan Gardner; Howard Morris; Shepard Menken; Everett Sloane; Julie Bennett
- Theme music composer: Carl Brandt
- Composer: Carl Brandt
- Country of origin: United States
- Original language: English
- No. of seasons: 1
- No. of episodes: 26 (list of episodes)

Production
- Executive producer: Henry G. Saperstein
- Editor: Sam Horta
- Running time: 30 minutes
- Production company: United Productions of America

Original release
- Network: NBC
- Release: 19 September 1964 – 24 April 1965

The Famous Adventures of Mr. Magoo is an American animated television series produced by United Productions of America that aired for one season on NBC from September 19, 1964 to April 24, 1965. It is the follow-up to the 1960/61 series Mister Magoo, with Jim Backus reprising the title role.

== Premise ==
Unlike the theatrical cartoons, which focused on the extremely nearsighted Quincy Magoo's bumbling, the show features the Magoo character as an actor in adaptations of such literary classics as Don Quixote and "Gunga Din". Each of these roles is played seriously, with few, if any, references to Magoo's nearsightedness. However, introductory segments in each program feature Magoo backstage stumbling into scenery and talking to props, thus connecting the older cartoons to this series. Some stories are contained in a single half-hour episode, but others run for two to four episodes. As UPA did not have its own studio facility, the production was farmed out to the Grantray-Lawrence and Format Films studios.

== Stories adapted ==
Among the most ambitious adaptations mounted in this format were the four-part Robin Hood, in which he took the role of Friar Tuck; Treasure Island, in which he played the villainous Long John Silver; and a version of Snow White in which he portrayed all seven of the Seven Dwarfs.

== Background ==
The series was inspired by the success of the 1962 television special Mister Magoo's Christmas Carol, a serious remake of the Charles Dickens classic novel with Magoo playing Ebenezer Scrooge.

== Reruns ==
The series was re-shown in the early 1970s on early Saturday mornings and the early 1980s as part of certain channels' weekday afternoon cartoon blocks. Certain episodes were released on VHS, but these have since gone out of print.

== Material not intended for children ==
The series was originally shown in prime time and not as part of an animated block for juvenile viewers. Therefore, certain more mature elements were present. These included death threats (William Tell, Robin Hood, Don Quixote, The Three Musketeers, Sherlock Holmes), children in danger (Treasure Island, Gunga Din, William Tell), insanity (Don Quixote, Moby Dick), heroic self-sacrifice (Gunga Din), religious themes (Noah's Ark), and realistic, although mostly bloodless, violence; including swordplay, shooting, clubbing, drowning and character deaths in most of the episodes.

== Episodes ==
#	Broadcast date	Title	Adapted for Television by
01	September 19, 1964	"William Tell"	Barbara Chain
02	September 26, 1964	"Treasure Island"— Part 1	Walter Black
03	October 3, 1964	"Treasure Island"— Part 2	Walter Black
04	October 10, 1964	"Gunga Din"	Sloan Nibley
05	October 17, 1964	"Moby Dick"	True Boardman
06	October 24, 1964	"The Three Musketeers"— Part 1	Joanna Lee
07	November 7, 1964	"The Three Musketeers"— Part 2	Joanna Lee
08	November 14, 1964	"Robin Hood"— Episode 1	Walter Black
09	November 21, 1964	"Robin Hood"— Episode 2	Walter Black
10	November 28, 1964	"Robin Hood"— Episode 3	Walter Black
11	December 5, 1964	"Robin Hood"— Episode 4	Walter Black
12	December 19, 1964	"Don Quixote de la Mancha"— Episode 1	True Boardman
13	December 26, 1964	"Cyrano de Bergerac"	True Boardman
14	January 2, 1965	"Snow White"— Episode 1	Barbara Chain
15	January 9, 1965	"Snow White"— Episode 2	Barbara Chain
16	January 16, 1965	"Rip Van Winkle"	Barbara Chain
17	February 6, 1965	"Dick Tracy and the Mob"	Sloan Nibley
18	February 13, 1965	"A Midsummer Night's Dream"	Barbara Chain
19	February 27, 1965	"The Count of Monte Cristo"	Walter Black
20	March 13, 1965	"Doctor Frankenstein"	Sloan Nibley
21	March 20, 1965	"Don Quixote de la Mancha"— Episode 2	True Boardman
22	March 27, 1965	"Captain Kidd"	Walter Black
23	April 3, 1965	"Noah's Ark"	Barbara Chain
24	April 10, 1965	"Sherlock Holmes"	True Boardman
25	April 17, 1965	"King Arthur"	Sloan Nibley
26	April 24, 1965	"Paul Revere"	Jerry D. Lewis

== Home video ==
In November 2011, Shout! Factory released Mr. Magoo: The Television Collection 1960-1977 on DVD in Region 1. This 11-disc collection contains all the episodes from all three Mr. Magoo television series, including all 26 episodes of The Famous Adventures of Mr. Magoo.
