= Mr. Magoo =

Fictional cartoon character

- Mr. Magoo and McBarker from What's New, Mr. Magoo?
- First appearance: The Ragtime Bear (1949)
- Created by: Millard Kaufman; John Hubley
- Adapted by: Willis Pyle; Sherm Glas
- Portrayed by: Leslie Nielsen
- Voiced by: Jim Backus (1949–1989); Greg Burson (film, animated segments); Jim Conroy (Kung-Fu Magoo); Ian Hanlin (2019–2023)

In-universe information
- Full name: Quincy Magoo
- Family: Linda (mother); Maryanne (daughter in-law); Granny (grandmother); Tycoon (uncle); Waldo (nephew)
- Nationality: American
- Alma mater: Rutgers University

Quincy Magoo, referred to as Mr. Magoo, is a fictional cartoon character created at the UPA animation studio in 1949. Voiced for many years by Jim Backus, Mr. Magoo is an elderly, wealthy, short-statured retiree who gets into a series of comical situations as a result of his extreme near-sightedness, compounded by his stubborn refusal to admit the problem. However, through uncanny streaks of luck, the situation always seems to work itself out for him, leaving him no worse off than before. Bystanders consequently tend to think that he is a lunatic, rather than just being near-sighted. In later cartoons, he is also an actor, and generally a competent one, except for his visual impairment.

The character became UPA's most popular original property and fronted a successful theatrical cartoon series of his own, which remained in production through 1959 before being revived for television. Four UPA Mister Magoo shorts were nominated for the Academy Award for Best Animated Short Film with two shorts winning the award: When Magoo Flew (1954) and Magoo's Puddle Jumper (1956).

In 2002, TV Guide ranked Mr. Magoo number 29 on its "50 Greatest Cartoon Characters of All Time" list.

== History ==
=== Creation and character ===
Mr. Magoo's first appearance was in the theatrical short cartoon The Ragtime Bear (1949), a UPA Jolly Frolics short written by Millard Kaufman and directed by John Hubley. In the short, the ornery, elderly, and nearsighted Mister Magoo spends a mountain hike mixing up his raccoon coat-wearing adult nephew Waldo with a wild bear who has stolen Waldo's hat.

Magoo's creation was a collaborative effort: director Hubley is said to have partly based the character on his uncle Harry Woodruff; W. C. Fields was another source of inspiration. UPA's distributor at the time, Columbia Pictures, was reluctant to release a short featuring a human character rather than an anthropomorphic animal such as Mickey Mouse or Bugs Bunny (or Columbia's own The Fox and the Crow, who'd starred in earlier UPA Jolly Frolics). Columbia relented only because the short also included a bear. The decision paid off: the short was a box-office success, and Magoo became a notable human cartoon character amongst the much more prominent anthropomorphic animal characters of the time.

The character of Mr. Magoo was originally conceived as a mean-spirited reactionary. Hubley, who had created Magoo, handed the series completely over to creative director Pete Burness. Under Burness, Magoo won two Academy Awards for the studio with When Magoo Flew (1954) and Magoo's Puddle Jumper (1956). Burness scrubbed Magoo of his meanness and left only a few strange comments that made him appear senile or somewhat mad. At the same time, art director Sterling Sturtevant redesigned the character's appearance. Magoo was frequently accompanied in his on-screen escapades with his nephew Waldo, voiced at various times by either Jerry Hausner or Daws Butler.

Mr. Magoo was depicted as having graduated from Rutgers University in 1928. His creators wanted him to be "a college alumnus who was still fired up with the old school spirit [and they felt] Rutgers was the embodiment of the 'old school tie' in America.". He would often shout out, "Alpha, Beta, Gamma, Rho – Rutgers, Rutgers, Go – Go – Go!"

A record album featuring Magoo, Magoo in Hi-Fi, was released in 1957. Side 1 consisted of a dialogue between Magoo and Waldo taking place while Magoo was attempting to set up his new sound system. Music on the album was composed and conducted by Dennis Farnon and his orchestra. Side 2, "The Mother Magoo Suite", was a series of musical pieces which included two solos by Marni Nixon.

In 1959, Mr. Magoo starred in 1001 Arabian Nights, directed by Jack Kinney, UPA's first feature-length production.

== In other media ==
=== Television ===
In the 1960s, UPA turned its attention to television and began producing the series Mister Magoo for the character. Because UPA had shut down its animation studio in 1959, the animation for these cartoons was done by Jack Kinney Productions and Larry Harmon Pictures. The cartoons suffered from varying character designs and choppier animation, due to rushed production schedules. Magoo's nephew Waldo (voiced, as in most of the theatrical cartoons, by Jerry Hausner) was seldom seen with his uncle, now appearing in his own episodes, introduced by a brief phone conversation from Magoo's point of view, which acted as a teaser. The Waldo episodes also featured a slick-talking con man named Prezly, and they always ended with a return to Magoo saying, "Oh, that Waldo and Prezly. What'll they be up to next? Hee hee hee!"

Magoo's houseboy Cholly (i.e., "Charlie") took up a lot of Waldo's slack. Cholly was an Asian stereotype with huge buck teeth and fractured English pronunciation. Still other cartoons featured Tycoon Magoo, voiced by Mel Blanc, and his bumbling assistant Worcestershire.

In 1962, UPA released Mister Magoo's Christmas Carol, an abbreviated but largely faithful retelling of Charles Dickens' tale. It was the first ever animated Christmas special made for television and the first hour-long animated TV special and is considered to be a holiday classic of the 1960s, ranking alongside A Charlie Brown Christmas and How the Grinch Stole Christmas!. The special inspired the production of an animated TV series titled The Famous Adventures of Mr. Magoo, which placed Magoo as an actor in other well-known stories. After an introduction in Magoo's backstage dressing room, Magoo was depicted in such roles as The Count of Monte Cristo, Merlin in an upbeat retelling of the story of King Arthur, Friar Tuck in Robin Hood, and Puck in A Midsummer Night's Dream.

In 1970, Mr. Magoo starred as Uncle Sam in the TV special Uncle Sam Magoo. Magoo later starred in a new Saturday morning television series called What's New, Mr. Magoo?, which ran during the 1977-78 television season on CBS. This series was made under license by the DePatie–Freleng studio, as UPA had by this time ceased in-house cartoon production.

The theatrical UPA Mister Magoo cartoons remained in TV syndication throughout the years, including being featured on Nickelodeon's mid-1990s variety series Weinerville.

=== Comics ===
Various comic books were published by Dell.

=== Advertising ===
Mr. Magoo helped advertise the General Electric line of products throughout the 1950s and 1960s, sometimes under the name Quincy Magoo. In 2005, Mr. Magoo became the spokesman of the optical retail store Sterling Optical. Magoo also was featured in a series of commercials for Stag Beer in the 1960s. Also in the 1960s, the Polaner company sold its line of preserves in jars decorated with images of Mr. Magoo which, when empty, could then be used as drinking glasses.

In 2012, Mr. Magoo appeared in MetLife's "Everyone" commercial during Super Bowl XLVI.

=== Video game ===
In 1994, a Sega Mega Drive game starring Mr. Magoo was in development and planned to be published by Millennium Interactive but was never released.

=== Live-action film ===
In December 1997, the live-action comedy film Mr. Magoo, produced by Walt Disney Pictures and starring Leslie Nielsen as the title character, was released to overwhelmingly negative critical reception. Some support groups for the disabled, including the National Federation of the Blind, protested it on behalf of the blind and sight-impaired.

=== Recent appearances ===
In 2010, a direct-to-video animated action-comedy film based on the character, Kung Fu Magoo, was released on DVD on May 11, 2010. It features the voices of Jim Conroy, Chris Parnell, Dylan and Cole Sprouse, and Alyson Stoner. The film is a Mexican–American co-production, produced by Classic Media, Ánima Estudios, and Santo Domingo Films. The film was directed by Andrés Couturier. It made its TV debut on Disney XD in 2011.

Magoo appeared in DreamWorks Animation's 2017 film The Boss Baby on the cover of a comic book.

Another television series, simply titled Mr. Magoo, began airing in 2019. Produced by the company Xilam, this series depicts a younger-looking Magoo and his pet dog named Mr. Cat (because it meows), who replaces McBarker, the dog depicted in earlier cartoons. An antagonist is added in the form of a hamster named Fizz and his human assistant named Weasel.

=== Other uses ===
ASI Entertainment has used Mr. Magoo cartoons to "warm up" audiences when testing television comedy pilots.

== Theatrical cartoon shorts ==
The following Mister Magoo cartoons were either nominees for, or recipients of, the Academy Award for Best Short Subject (Cartoons):

- 1950: Trouble Indemnity
- 1952: Pink and Blue Blues
- 1954: When Magoo Flew (winner)
- 1956: Magoo's Puddle Jumper (winner)

== Characters ==
- Mr. Quincy Magoo (voiced by Jim Backus) – An extremely short-sighted elderly man whose eyesight is failing, although he either does not know it or is too stubborn to admit it and/or do anything about it (i.e. wearing his glasses). His catchphrase, usually said by him as his closing line, is: "Oh Magoo, you've done it again."
- Waldo (voiced by Jerry Hausner from 1949 to 1955 and in the 1960s series, Daws Butler from 1956 to 1959 and on the 1957 record album Magoo in Hi-Fi, and Casey Kasem in the 1970s series) – Mr. Magoo's nephew.
- Bowser - Mr. Magoo's dog (actually a Siamese cat) in the 1960s cartoons.
- McBarker (voiced by Bob Ogle) – Mr. Magoo's dog in the 1970s cartoon series What's New, Mr. Magoo? A talking white Bulldog, he shares his owner's facial features and poor eyesight.
- Mother Magoo (voiced first by Henny Backus in "Meet Mother Magoo" (1956), then June Foray) – Mr. Magoo's "Momma", Linda.
- Grandma "Granny" Magoo
- Charlie (voiced by Benny Rubin) – Mr. Magoo's houseboy. Charlie's depiction as an Asian stereotype was controversial. The character was prone to unusual misuses of English, such as referring to himself in the third person as "Cholly", and calling Mr. Magoo "Missuh Magloo" and "Bloss" instead of "Boss". In the late 1960s, episodes featuring Charlie were dropped from the series and his character was never seen, referred to or even mentioned again. A version of the series that ran on the Christian network KTV retains Charlie, but dubs over his ethnic stereotype voice track.
- Prezly (voiced by Daws Butler) – Waldo's "partner in crime" in the 1960s cartoons.
- Wheeler and Dealer – Two children Mr. Magoo occasionally babysits in The Mister Magoo Show (1960–1961).
- Tycoon Magoo (voiced by Mel Blanc) – Mr. Magoo's rich uncle. His catchphrase is "Worcestershire, get in here!"
- Worcestershire (voiced by Mel Blanc) – Tycoon Magoo's butler, who is always trying to prevent Mr. Magoo from ruining Tycoon Magoo's property.
- Additional character voices were provided by Paul Frees, Frank Nelson and Mel Blanc, among others.

== Home media ==
On February 8, 2005, Sony BMG Music Entertainment's former kids and family entertainment division, Sony Wonder (under license from Classic Media) released The Mr. Magoo Show: Complete DVD Collection. This four-disc set featured all 26 uncut episodes of the 1960 series, digitally remastered from original film prints and presented in its original broadcast presentation and order, as well as bonus features. This release has been discontinued and is now out of print.

On November 8, 2011, Shout! Factory (under license from Classic Media) released Mr. Magoo: The Television Collection 1960–1977 on DVD in Region 1. This 11-disc collection contains all the episodes from all three Mr. Magoo television series, including all 26 episodes of Mister Magoo, all 26 episodes of The Famous Adventures of Mr. Magoo, all 16 episodes of What's New, Mister Magoo?, and the prime-time TV special Uncle Sam Magoo, as well as several bonus features.

On December 6, 2011, Sony released the feature film 1001 Arabian Nights on DVD through their Screen Classics manufactured-on-demand (MOD) program, now available through a licensing deal through the Warner Archive Collection.

In 2011, animation historian Jerry Beck announced the release of a Shout! Factory boxed set of the Mr. Magoo theatrical (UPA) shorts, under license from Sony. Originally scheduled for release in 2012, the set was pushed back for two years as Sony remastered some of the cartoons from higher quality sources, including newly discovered elements. The four-disc Mr. Magoo Theatrical Collection, containing all 53 of the Mr. Magoo theatrical shorts distributed by Columbia through 1959, and the 1959 theatrical film 1001 Arabian Nights, was released on April 22, 2014.
