= Stephen Bosustow =

American film producer

Stephen Reginald Bosustow (November 6, 1911 in Victoria, British Columbia – July 4, 1981) was a Canadian-born American film producer from 1943 until his retirement in 1979. He was one of the founders of United Productions of America (UPA) and produced nearly 600 cartoon and live-action shorts. He is chiefly remembered for producing a string of Mr. Magoo and Gerald McBoing-Boing cartoons in the 1950s, three of which earned Academy Awards. He is the only film producer in history who received all the Oscar nominations in one category (1956), guaranteeing him the winning Oscar. Magoo's Puddle Jumper was the eventual winner.

== Biography ==
Bosustow began his animation career in the early 1930s working for the Ub Iwerks and Walter Lantz studios before joining Walt Disney Productions in 1934 as an animator and writer. He left Disney during the 1941 Disney animators' strike and joined Hughes Aircraft as an illustrator. He co-founded the Industrial Film and Poster Service in 1943 which evolved into UPA. Between 1949 and 1957, he received thirteen Oscar nominations.

In 1963, Bosustow Entertainment was established and his son, Nick Bosustow, produced the 1983 Emmy Award winner for CBS-TV, Wrong Way Kid, starring Dick Van Dyke. Also in 1963, Bosustow formed a subsidiary for animated commercials in Hong Kong with his son Tee Bosustow. In 1968, he partnered with Nick to form Stephen Bosustow Productions, which produced films for theaters including the Oscar-winner Is It Always Right to Be Right? (1971), an Academy Award-nominated animated film Legend of John Henry (1974), as well as Sesame Street and CBS-TV after school specials.

Stephen Bosustow died of pneumonia July 4, 1981 at the age of 69. Four years later, his son Nick closed down the studio.

== Personal life ==
Bosustow had two sons, Nick and Tee. Tee Bosustow died in 2018 and Nick Bosustow died in 2022.

The name Bosustow is Cornish, meaning "dwelling of Ustoc" in the Cornish language.
