= United Productions of America =

American animation studio and later distribution company (1941–2000)

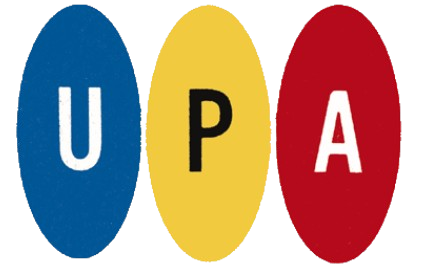
- Formerly: Industrial Film and Poster Service (1941–1944); United Film Productions (1944-1945)
- Type: Private
- Industry: Animation
- Predecessor: Screen Gems (theatrical shorts, 1921–1949)
- Founded: 1941; 85 years ago (as Industrial Film and Poster Service); 1945; 81 years ago (as United Productions of America)
- Founders: Zack Schwartz; David Hilberman; Stephen Bosustow
- Defunct: 1970; 56 years ago (Animation department); January 1, 2000; 26 years ago (Company)
- Fate: Closed; assets purchased by Classic Media
- Successor: Classic Media (character rights); Columbia Pictures (theatrical shorts); Warner Bros. Animation (Private Snafu and Gay Purr-ee)
- Headquarters: Burbank, California, United States
- Key people: Stephen Bosustow; Robert Cannon; John Hubley; Pete Burness; Paul Julian; Henry G. Saperstein
- Products: wartime/theatrical animated shorts television shows

United Productions of America, better known as UPA, was an American animation studio and later distribution company founded in 1941 as Industrial Film and Poster Service by former Walt Disney Productions employees. Beginning with industrial and World War II training films, UPA eventually produced theatrical shorts for Columbia Pictures such as the Mr. Magoo series. In 1956, UPA produced a television series for CBS, The Gerald McBoing-Boing Show, hosted by Gerald McBoing Boing. In the 1960s, UPA produced syndicated Mr. Magoo and Dick Tracy television series and other series and specials, including Mister Magoo's Christmas Carol. UPA also produced two animated features, 1001 Arabian Nights and Gay Purr-ee, and distributed Japanese films from Toho Studios in the 1970s and 1980s.

Universal Pictures currently owns the majority of the UPA library after their acquisition of DreamWorks Animation in 2016. The theatrical shorts, which were released by Columbia Pictures, are still owned by that studio (via parent company Sony Pictures Entertainment).

== History ==
=== Origins ===
UPA was founded during the Disney animators' strike of 1941, which resulted in the exodus of a number of long-time Walt Disney Animation Studios staff members. Among them was John Hubley, a layout artist who was unhappy with the ultra-realistic style of animation that Disney had been utilizing. Along with a number of his colleagues, Hubley believed that animation did not have to be a painstakingly realistic imitation of real life; they felt that the medium of animation had been constrained by efforts to depict cinematic reality. Chuck Jones' 1942 cartoon The Dover Boys had demonstrated that animation could freely experiment with character design, depth, and perspective to create a stylized artistic vision appropriate to the subject matter. Hubley, Bobe Cannon, and others at UPA, sought to produce animated films with sufficient freedom to express design ideas considered radical by other established studios.

UPA-produced Private Snafu short film A Few Quick Facts About Fear from 1945

In 1941, Zack Schwartz, David Hilberman, and Stephen Bosustow formed a studio called first Industrial Film and Poster Service, where they were free to apply their new techniques in film animation. Finding work (and income) in the then-booming field of wartime work for the government, the small studio produced a cartoon sponsored by the United Auto Workers (UAW) in 1944. Hell-Bent for Election was directed by Chuck Jones and was produced for the reelection campaign of FDR. The film was a success, and it led to another assignment from the UAW, Brotherhood of Man (1945). The film, directed by Bobe Cannon, advocated tolerance of all people. The short was innovative not only in its message but in its very flat, stylized design, in complete defiance of the Disney approach. With its new-found status, the studio renamed itself United Productions of America (UPA).

Initially, UPA contracted with the United States government to produce its animation output, but the government contracts began to evaporate as the FBI began investigating Communist activities in Hollywood in the late 1940s. No formal charges were filed against anyone at UPA in the beginnings of McCarthyism, but the government contracts were lost as Washington severed its ties with Hollywood.

=== Columbia Pictures and success ===
UPA entered the crowded field of theatrical cartoons to sustain itself and gained a contract with Columbia Pictures. Columbia had historically been an also-ran in the field of animated shorts, and it was not satisfied with the output of its Screen Gems cartoon studio. The UPA animators applied their stylistic concepts and storytelling to Columbia's characters The Fox and the Crow with the shorts Robin Hoodlum (1948) and The Magic Fluke (1949), both directed by Hubley. Both were nominated for Academy Awards, and Columbia granted the studio permission to create its own new characters. Hubley responded, not with another "funny animal", but a star that was a human character, a crotchety, nearsighted old man. The Ragtime Bear (1949), the first appearance of Mr. Magoo, was a box-office hit, and UPA's star quickly rose as the 1950s dawned. While Hubley would direct the first few Magoo shorts, most of the characters subsequent shorts would be directed by animator Pete Burness.

With a unique, sparse drawing style that contrasted greatly with other cartoons of the day, not to mention the novelty of a human character in a field crowded with talking cats, mice, and rabbits, the Mr. Magoo series won accolades for UPA. Two Magoo cartoons won the Academy Award for Animated Short Film: When Magoo Flew (1954) and Magoo's Puddle Jumper (1956).

UPA scored another hit with Gerald McBoing-Boing (1950), based on a record by Dr. Seuss. Gerald McBoing-Boing won UPA the Academy Award in 1950; UPA cartoons would receive a total of fifteen Oscar nominations between 1949 and 1959. In December 1950, UPA announced plans for a feature-length film based on the work of cartoonist and humorist James Thurber. The film was to combine live action and animation and was tentatively titled Men, Women and Dogs, but it was never completed. (Only one of the Thurber pieces intended for this feature, The Unicorn in the Garden, was eventually released as a short subject.) Shorts such as The Tell-Tale Heart and Rooty Toot Toot featured striking, sophisticated designs unlike anything offered by competing studios. The "UPA style" began to influence significant changes at the other major animation studios, including Warner Bros., MGM, Famous Studios, and even Disney, ushering in a new era of experimentation in animation.

By late 1951, at the height of the Red Scare, UPA became embroiled in controversy when layout artist Bernyce Fleury testified before the House Un-American Activities Committee that a number of UPA artists promoted communism in there films. In response, Columbia sent UPA a list of eight suspected communist employees the following April, and ordered the named employees to either confess or leave the company all together. Hubley, who was one of the eight named on the list and the studios most significant employee, refused to denounced communism. He was subsequently fired from UPA on May 31, 1952, and was effectively blacklisted from the animation industry. Hubley's termination is considered in retrospect to be the beginning of UPA's artistic decline.

=== Turning to television ===
As the decade progressed, UPA began to rely more heavily on the Mr. Magoo shorts for financial stability. But in 1955, Steve Bosustow secured a CBS contract for the studio to produce a television series (The Boing-Boing Show aka The Gerald McBoing Boing Show), which premiered in December 1956. Supervised by Robert Cannon, this production offered an array of styles and brought then-new talent to the studio, such as Ernest Pintoff, Fred Crippen, Jimmy Murakami, Richard Williams, George Dunning, Mel Leven, Aurelius Battaglia, and John Whitney, among others. However, audiences did not embrace UPA's experiment in television entertainment; as a result, the show vanished from the airwaves in 1958. Further, as the major Hollywood studios began cutting back and shutting down their short film divisions in the late-1950s and early-1960s, UPA was in financial straits, and Steve Bosustow sold the studio to a producer named Henry G. Saperstein.

Saperstein was a man whom artist Victor Haboush described as “big,” “grueling” and “hard-nosed,” who had little to no care “about art or anything.” Proclaiming that the studio was “not going to do any more of this fine-art crap,” Saperstein shifted UPA's focus to television to sustain the studio. UPA adapted Mr. Magoo for television and produced another series based on the comic strip Dick Tracy. UPA was forced to churn out cartoons at a far greater quantity than the studio had done for theatrical releases or even the CBS television series. With the greater workload, quality languished, and UPA's reputation as an artistic innovator faded.

UPA's style of limited animation was adopted by other animation studios, especially by television cartoon studios such as Hanna-Barbera Productions. However, this procedure was generally implemented as a cost-cutting measure rather than an artistic choice that UPA originally intended. A plethora of low-budget, cheaply-made cartoons over the next twenty years effectively reduced television animation to a commodity, partly popularizing the notion of animation as being made only for children rather than a medium for any age group to enjoy (with the exception of shows like The Flintstones), and notoriously going against UPA's original goal to expand the boundaries of animation and create a new style for the medium.

One bright moment in the UPA television era came with Mister Magoo's Christmas Carol (1962), which inspired the format of Magoo's next television endeavor, the 1964 series The Famous Adventures of Mr. Magoo. Based on Charles Dickens' book from 1843, Magoo's Christmas Carol was the first animated Christmas special to be produced for television, and is considered a holiday classic, ranking alongside A Charlie Brown Christmas and How the Grinch Stole Christmas!.

UPA produced only two full-length feature films in their tenure: a 1959 feature starring Mr. Magoo titled 1001 Arabian Nights, directed by ex-Disney animator Jack Kinney; and Gay Purr-ee in 1962, written by Chuck Jones and his wife Dorothy and directed by a friend of Jones, Abe Levitow. Both of the films were financial dissappointments at the box office.

=== Abandoning animation and Toho ===
Saperstein kept UPA afloat in the 1960s and beyond by abandoning animation production completely after the animation studio closed permanently in 1970 and sold off UPA's library of cartoons, although the studio retained the licenses and copyrights on Mr. Magoo, Gerald McBoing-Boing and the other UPA characters. This led to UPA contracting with DePatie–Freleng Enterprises studio to produce a new animated series called What's New Mr. Magoo? in September 1977.

Columbia Pictures retained ownership of UPA's theatrical cartoons. The studio's TV cartoon library was licensed by Classic Media in New York, and then in 2007 merged into Entertainment Rights in London.

In 1970, Saperstein led UPA into a contract with Toho Co., Ltd. of Japan to distribute its "giant monster" (see kaiju and tokusatsu) movies in America. Theatrical releases, and especially TV syndication, of the Toho monster movies created a new cult movie market for Japanese monster movies, and long-running television movie syndication packages such as Creature Double Feature exposed the Toho movie monsters to young American audiences, who embraced them and helped them maintain their popularity throughout the 1970s and 1980s.

When Toho began producing a new generation of monster movies in the late 1980s, beginning with Godzilla 1985, UPA capitalized on its Toho contract and helped introduce the new kaiju features to the Western world.

Because of its long association with Toho, UPA is better known to cult-movie fans today as Toho's American distributor rather than a pioneer of animated cartoons, but the legacy of UPA is an important chapter in the history of American animation. UPA continued to license the American library of Godzilla movies through to 2017 when the rights were transferred to Janus Films. UPA's contract with Toho also resulted in Saperstein producing Woody Allen's first feature film, What's Up, Tiger Lily?.

Henry Saperstein died in 1998. On January 1, 2000, UPA shuttered its operations, with the assets sold by the Saperstein family, which would later result in the founding of Classic Media by May 2000. On July 23, 2012, DreamWorks Animation purchased Classic Media for $155 million and, as a result, UPA is now owned by DreamWorks Animation, which would be acquired by NBCUniversal in 2016. Although DreamWorks Animation (and later, Universal Studios) now owns the ancillary rights to most of the UPA library, UPA itself (with DreamWorks Animation/Universal) continues to hold the licensing rights to Mr. Magoo, and Saperstein was executive producer to Disney's unsuccessful live-action feature Mr. Magoo in 1997.

== Legacy ==
UPA Pictures' legacy in the history of animation has largely been overshadowed by the commercial success and availability of the cartoon libraries of Warner Bros., MGM and Disney. Nonetheless, UPA had a significant impact on animation style, content, and technique, and its innovations were recognized and adopted by the other major animation studios and independent filmmakers all over the world as UPA pioneered the technique of limited animation. Although this style of animation came to be widely used in the 1960s and 1970s as a cost-cutting measure, it was originally intended as a stylistic alternative to the growing trend (particularly at Disney) of recreating cinematic realism in animated films. UPA was also a central influence on the foundation of the Zagreb School of Animated Films in the 1950s. Animators in Yugoslavia were heavily impacted by UPA's work on The Four Poster (1952), a live-action film with animation directed by John Hubley, in his final project at UPA.

Both Gerald McBoing-Boing and The Tell-Tale Heart were inducted into the National Film Registry.

== DVD releases ==
Classic Media/Sony Wonder began issuing the Mr. Magoo TV cartoon series on DVD in 2001, beginning with Mr. Magoo's Christmas Carol (which received a Collector's Edition Blu-ray/DVD combo pack in 2010). In 2011, Shout! Factory (with Classic Media) released the Mr. Magoo: The Television Collection set which contained all Mr. Magoo television productions (except for Mr. Magoo's Christmas Carol, for which the DVD copy from the 2010 Blu-ray release was issued by itself). In 2013, Shout! (with Sony) released the Mr. Magoo Theatrical Collection containing all the Mr. Magoo theatrical shorts and the full-length feature 1001 Arabian Nights (which was also released through Sony's MOD program in December 2011). The set was originally set for release on February 14, 2012 but then delayed to June 19, then December 4, then delayed to sometime in 2013. It was delayed so that the shorts could be restored from high quality sources (plus newly discovered elements added).

The Jolly Frolics Collection was released on March 15, 2012 through Turner Classic Movies' website. Extras included audio commentaries and an introduction by film critic Leonard Maltin.

== See also ==
- Golden age of American animation
- Googie architecture
- Modernist film

== Bibliography ==
- Abraham, Adam (2012): When Magoo Flew: The Rise and Fall of Animation Studio UPA. Wesleyan University Press.
- Amidi, Amid (2006): Cartoon Modern: Style and Design in Fifties Animation. Chronicle Books.
- Barrier, Michael (1999): Hollywood Cartoons: American Animation in Its Golden Age. Oxford University Press.
- Larsen, Darl (2024): Moving Pictures: A History of American Animation from Gertie to Pixar and Beyond. Rowman & Littlefield.
- Maltin, Leonard (1980): Of Mice and Magic: A History of American Animated Cartoons. McGraw Hill.
- Solomon, Charles (1989): Enchanted Drawings: The History of Animation. Alfred A. Knopf.
- Shapiro, Susan P (1980): Detecting Illegalities: A Perspective on the Control of Securities Violations. Yale University
