= Gary Mooney =

American animator

Gary Mooney (1930 – August 5, 2008) was an American animator who worked for Walt Disney Studios, Hubley Studios, Total Television Productions and fellow animator Jay Ward during his career, which spanned several decades from the 1950s to the 2000s (decade). Some of the most famous projects in which Mooney participated in included Disney's Sleeping Beauty, Lady and the Tramp and Ward's George of the Jungle. He also worked on several live action films. Mooney also completed many animated sequences, title sequences and graphics for use in live action films, television shows and commercials.

Some of Mooney's earliest work included uncredited assistant animator positions on the Walt Disney animated films Lady and the Tramp in 1955 and Sleeping Beauty in 1959. Mooney later worked for Hubley Studios and Jay Ward and continued to work in the United States.

In 1960, Mooney teamed with fellow animator Lu Guarnier to animate Switchin' Kitten, the first Tom and Jerry cartoon to be directed by Gene Deitch. Mooney became an animator for Storyboard Studios, which were owned by John Hubley and Faith Hubley, upon his arrival in New York City. He worked on a number of cartoons for the Hubleys while at Storyboard Studios. He was the animation director on the film, Of Stars and Men in 1964. Mooney also worked as an animator on the Hubley produced Children of the Sun in 1960, The Hole in 1962, and The Hat in 1963. He also animated 1966's The Cruise, which was created for the National Film Board of Canada and directed by John and Faith Hubley.

Mooney also worked on the 1967 George of the Jungle original television series, as well as all of Total Television's cartoon shows, including Underdog. Some of Mooney's other work from the era included the 1975 syndicated television special, The Happy Prince and The MAD Magazine TV Special, which was created in 1974 but never released. Mooney also animated on the 1977 Sanrio film, The Mouse and His Child and Jack Zander's 1980 animated film Gnomes, which received an Emmy nomination in 1981 for Outstanding Animated Program. He also provided much of the animation for Taarna and Captain Sternn segments for Heavy Metal, a 1981 Canadian animated film.

Outside of animated work, Mooney was hired to provide animation on live action films, including the animated title sequence for City Slickers, as well as Honeymoon in Vegas, Honey, I Blew Up the Kid, Steven Spielberg's Jurassic Park in 1993, Four Rooms and 1996's A Very Brady Sequel. Mooney's live action television portfolio included the 1984 television special George Carlin on Campus and David Macaulay: Roman City, which aired in 1994.

Mooney's most recent projects included the O Canada animated series and Disney's Kronk's New Groove, as well as animation for the 2007 live action film, Are We Done Yet? starring Ice Cube and Nia Long.

Gary Mooney died on August 5, 2008, of cancer at the age of 78. He was survived by his wife, Samantha Mooney, and his son, Jake. plus his first son, Max Hoecker, daughter, Laura Rediehs and first wife Sandra Hoecker.

Producer Bob Kurtz, who worked with Mooney to create animation for many of his television commercials and movie titles and produced George Carlin on Campus, called Mooney "the best draftsman I ever worked with."
