= Bill Littlejohn =

Animator, union organizer (1914–2010)

- Born: William Charles Littlejohn; January 27, 1914; Newark, New Jersey, U.S.
- Died: September 17, 2010 (aged 96); Malibu, California, U.S.
- Occupations: Animator, union organizer
- Years active: 1934–2001
- Spouse: Fini Rudiger (m. 1943; died 2004)
- Children: 2

William Charles "Bill" Littlejohn (January 27, 1914 – September 17, 2010) was an American animator and union organizer. Littlejohn worked on animated shorts and features in the 1930s through to the 1990s. His notable works include several earlier Tom and Jerry shorts, the Peanuts television specials, the Oscar-winning short The Hole (1962), and the Oscar-nominated A Doonesbury Special (1977). He was inducted into the Cartoon Hall of Fame and received the Winsor McCay Award and garnered lifetime achievement awards from the Annie Awards and the UCLA Film and Television Archive. Director Michael Sporn has called Littlejohn "an animation 'God'."

Littlejohn co-founded and served as the first president of the Screen Cartoonists Guild Local #852 in 1938. He led the effort to gain recognition for the union at the major Hollywood animation studios. When Walt Disney refused to negotiate with the union and fired 16 pro-union artists, Littlejohn led the union in the 1941 Disney animators' strike. The strike lasted nine weeks and resulted in Disney's recognition of the union, substantial salary increases, a 40-hour work week and screen credits. The Disney strike has been recognized as a watershed moment in the movement to unionize the animation industry.

Littlejohn was an active advocate for the art of animation, becoming a co-founder of ASIFA-Hollywood in 1957 and of the International Tournée of Animation in the mid-1960s. He also served on the Academy of Motion Picture Arts and Sciences Board of Governors representing short films and animation from 1988 to 2001.

== Early years ==
Littlejohn was born in Newark, New Jersey in 1914. His father was an engineer for Pitney Bowes who worked an early combination of the adding machine and typewriter. In either 1931 or 1934 (sources differ on the date), he began working in animation at the Van Beuren Studio in New York. His aunt was a cameraperson there and he was hired as a cel washer on the original Tom and Jerry series (no relation to the other, more widely-known series). He recalled: "One of my first jobs was to hand out cels to the inkers. They were so slippery in their tissue separators that when I first was handed a stack, I immediately let them drop all over the floor!" Littlejohn worked his way up within the Van Beuren Studio to inking, assisting and then animating. In a 1985 interview, he recalled: "Fear of starving led me to animation — those were Depression days. I had no art training, but learned animation from a do-it-yourself kit." While at Van Beuren, he worked on Toonerville Trolley (1936), The Parrotville Fire Department (1934) and two animated Amos 'n' Andy shorts, The Rasslin' Match (1934) and The Lion Tamer (1934).

== Hollywood in the 1930s and 1940s ==
When Van Beuren closed its doors in 1936, Littlejohn moved to Los Angeles, completed a degree in aeronautical engineering, and worked for a time at Lockheed. He recalled, "I began work at Lockheed, but the people there were so boring! They would talk all night about the qualities of a rivet."

In 1937, Littlejohn returned to animation, working for Harman-Ising Productions and the Metro-Goldwyn-Mayer cartoon department. While at MGM, he worked on the Happy Harmonies shorts and the then-new Tom and Jerry series. Littlejohn was one of the few people (alongside Jack Zander) who worked on the two unrelated Tom and Jerry series at both Van Beuren and MGM. In 1938, Littlejohn worked on Milt Gross' Jitterbug Follies and was responsible for animating the two dancing penguins. He also worked in 1938 on The Captain and the Kids, an MGM animated series based on The Katzenjammer Kids comic strip.

He left animation work during World War II to work as a test pilot and flight instructor. He also continued to do freelance animation for MGM and Walter Lantz.

== Union organizer and the Disney animators strike ==
While working at Van Beuren in 1935, Littlejohn saw the origins of the efforts to unionize the animation industry. At that time, he recalled, "I kept my nose clean because many guys were getting in trouble and getting blacklisted."

In 1938, Littlejohn met union organizer Herb Sorrell, and together they formed the Screen Cartoonists Guild Local #852 with Littlejohn as the president. Littlejohn later explained his decision to become involved in the union movement: "I just saw too many people getting away with a lot, and too few with nothing, and I had to get involved. So we formed a union."

Sorrell and Littlejohn began organizing animation workers, and MGM, Walter Lantz and George Pal quickly recognized the union. Leon Schlesinger Productions followed after a six-day lockout, but Disney refused to sign a union contract. After collecting enough members representation cards, Sorrell, Littlejohn and Disney animator Art Babbitt met Walt Disney and his attorneys. Disney angrily refused to negotiate and insisted his animators were represented by the Federation of Screen Cartoonists, a sham union set up by Disney that was declared illegal by the National Labor Relations Board. After the meeting, Disney fired Babbitt and 16 other pro-union artists. The 1941 Disney animators' strike began the next day. As animators marched in front of the Disney studio in Burbank, Littlejohn, who was a pilot, flew overhead and, in his words, "wiggled my wings" at the picketers, who "wiggled their signs back at me." The strike lasted for nine weeks and ended following pressure on Disney from federal mediators, nationwide boycotts, the Bank of America and Roy Disney. On September 21, 1941, the strike ended and the union was recognized by Disney.

Walt Disney later testified before the U.S. House Committee on Un-American Activities that he believed that Sorrell was a Communist, but his testimony was based on hearsay, "I believed at that time that Mr. Sorrell was a Communist because of all the things that I had heard ..." Littlejohn recalled Sorrell as follows: "Herb was an ex-fighter and a great champion for the little guy. For that he was called a Communist, which he never was. In fact, the Communist Party/USA disliked him too, because he was his own man and couldn't be controlled." Despite his involvement in the union movement, Littlejohn was not a target of McCarthyism or the Hollywood blacklist. He later recalled, "I regularly went over in my mind what I would say when the FBI came a-calling, but they never did, strangely enough."

The Disney strike has been recognized as a watershed moment in the efforts to unionize the animation industry. According to one account of the strike, the strike resulted in substantial salary increases, a 40-hour work week and screen credits for animators. Tom Sito, president emeritus of the Hollywood Animation Guild Local No.839, said, "Bill Littlejohn was the last of the dynamic Hollywood union organizers of the 1930s and '40s. His activism did much to build the standard of living studio animators have today."

== 1950s-1960s ==
In the 1950s, Littlejohn worked at several commercial studios including Playhouse Pictures, Jay Ward Productions, Animation Inc., Fine Arts Films, The Ink Tank, and Bill Melendez Productions. His animated commercial for Uniroyal's "Tiger Paws" tires remains a popular and often-played piece.

While associated with Melendez, he worked as one of the principal animators on the Peanuts televisions specials and feature films. His most popular scenes from the Peanuts specials and films included the one in A Charlie Brown Christmas (1965) where Snoopy dances on the piano while Schroeder plays a jazz riff, the Snoopy-Lucy prizefight in Snoopy Come Home (1972) and the Snoopy-Red Baron air battle in It's the Great Pumpkin, Charlie Brown (1966). Littlejohn recalled that the scene of Snoopy dancing on Schroeder's piano met resistance from Charles Schulz: "At first Charles Schulz didn't care for all the Snoopy pantomime. He felt it was deviating too much from his style. He wanted the whole film to be talking heads, doing his dialogue." One of Littlejohn's personal favorites was a scene in the aforementioned Snoopy Come Home in which a little girl takes Snoopy into her house, changes his name to "Rex," gives him a bath, and cross-dresses him for a tea party.

== Association with the Hubleys and later years ==
In 1962, Littlejohn was the principal animator on the Hubleys' Oscar-winning short The Hole, where two New York construction workers (one voiced by jazz legend Dizzy Gillespie) use improvised dialogue to debate the possibility of nuclear war. In one scene, Littlejohn animated Gillespie's character performing dance steps. At the after-party, Gillespie told Littlejohn "Man, I'm glad you did that section yourself, because I can't dance!"

Littlejohn also worked with the Hubleys in 1977 on A Doonesbury Special, which won a Jury Prize at the Cannes Film Festival and was nominated for an Oscar. Littlejohn did initial test animation of Zonker Harris putting flowers in the muzzles of National Guardsmen's rifles. Garry Trudeau was amazed at Littlejohn's work, having never seen his characters moving before. Littlejohn animated about 12 minutes of the special. John Hubley died during open-heart surgery while the special was in production.

Littlejohn also worked with the Hubleys on The Hat (1963), Of Stars and Men (1964), Zuckerkandl (1969), Voyage to Next (1974), People, People, People (1975), Everybody Rides the Carousel (1976), Sky Dance, Enter Life (1982) and Amazonia (1990).

Director Michael Sporn has called Littlejohn "an animation 'God'" and cited his work as among the best in American animation. Of his work on the 1964 film Of Stars and Men, Sporn said, "Bill's work on Of Stars and Men has completely entered my vocabulary of great animation. The walk cycles for the many animals are just so majestic and regal that I watch them over and over."

Littlejohn worked with John and Faith Hubley for more than 30 years. In his later years, Littlejohn also worked on several other feature films, including The Phantom Tollbooth (1970), Watership Down (1978), Heavy Metal (1981), R.O. Blechman's The Soldier's Tale (1984), and the cartoon sequences in Mrs. Doubtfire (1993).

== Advocacy for the art of animation ==
In 1957, he joined with Ward Kimball and Les Goldman in founding ASIFA-Hollywood, a non-profit organization formed to promote and preserve the art of film animation. Since 1972, the organization has presented the annual Annie Awards for outstanding work in animation.

In 1965, Littlejohn and other ASIFA-Hollywood members organized the International Tournée of Animation, a program to show quality animation at the Los Angeles County Museum of Art. Prior to this, it had been almost impossible to see quality animation in the United States. The Tournee became affiliated with the American Film Institute in 1969 and conducted a multi-city tour for many years.

In 1984, Littlejohn and his wife, Fini, helped organize the Olympiad of Animation for the 1984 Olympic Arts Festival.

From 1988 to 2001, Littlejohn was also a member of the Academy of Motion Picture Arts and Sciences Board of Governors representing short films and animation. He was on the advisory board of the Los Angeles Student Film Institute.

== Family ==
Littlejohn was married for 61 years to Fini Rudiger Littlejohn, an actress and artist from Vienna, Austria that did art design for American Airlines and Disney. The two married in 1943 and lived together in Malibu, California. Fini died in 2004 followed by Littlejohn in September 2010 at age 96. He was survived by two children, Steve and Toni, and three grandchildren.

== Awards and tributes ==
In October 1981, ASIFA presented Littlejohn with a special Annie Award, "honoring his 50 years as an animator." He also received the Winsor McCay Award in 1987 and has been inducted into the Cartoon Hall of Fame. In May 1999, the UCLA Film and Television Archive and UCLA Animation Workshop hosted "An Evening With Animator Bill Littlejohn" and presented him with a lifetime achievement award.

== Partial filmography ==
- Parrotville (1934-1935)
- The Rasslin' Match (1934)
- The Lion Tamer (1934)
- Toonerville Trolley (1936)
- The Captain and the Kids (1938)
- Jitterbug Follies (1939) (uncredited)
- A Rainy Day with the Bear Family (1940) (uncredited)
- Tom and Jerry (1941-1942, 1944) (uncredited: The Midnight Snack to The Bowling Alley Cat; additional animation: Fine Feathered Friend and Puttin' on the Dog)
- MGM Cartoons – uncredited: We Wish You a Merry Christmas (1941)
- Barney Bear – uncredited: The Flying Bear (1941)
- The Hole (1962)
- A Boy Named Charlie Brown (1963) (uncredited)
- Of Stars and Men (1964)
- The Hat (1964)
- A Charlie Brown Christmas (1965)
- It's the Great Pumpkin, Charlie Brown (1966)
- Zuckerklandl (1968)
- He's Your Dog, Charlie Brown (1968)
- Charlie Brown and Charles Schulz (1969) (uncredited)
- A Boy Named Charlie Brown (1969)
- It Was a Short Summer, Charlie Brown (1969)
- The Phantom Tollbooth (1970)
- Play It Again, Charlie Brown (1971)
- Snoopy Come Home (1972)
- You're Not Elected, Charlie Brown (1972)
- There's No Time for Love, Charlie Brown (1973)
- A Charlie Brown Thanksgiving (1973)
- It's a Mystery, Charlie Brown (1974)
- Voyage to Next (1974)
- It's the Easter Beagle, Charlie Brown (1974)
- Everybody Rides the Carousel (1975)
- Be My Valentine, Charlie Brown (1975)
- WOW Women of the World (1975)
- You're a Good Sport, Charlie Brown (1975)
- Happy Anniversary, Charlie Brown (1976) (uncredited)
- It's Arbor Day, Charlie Brown (1976)
- People, People, People (1976)
- Simple Gifts (1977)
- Whither Weather (1977)
- Race for Your Life, Charlie Brown (1977)
- It's Your First Kiss, Charlie Brown (1977)
- A Doonesbury Special (1977)
- Step by Step (1978)
- Watership Down (1978) (opening sequence)
- Happy Birthday, Charlie Brown (1979) (uncredited)
- You're the Greatest, Charlie Brown (1979)
- She's a Good Skate, Charlie Brown (1980)
- Bon Voyage, Charlie Brown (and Don't Come Back!!) (1980)
- Sky Dance (1980)
- Life Is a Circus, Charlie Brown (1980)
- The Big Bang and Other Creation Myths (1981)
- Enter Life (1981)
- It's Magic, Charlie Brown (1981)
- Heavy Metal (1981) (segment "B-17")
- Someday You'll Find Her, Charlie Brown (1981)
- No Man's Valley (1981)
- Here Comes Garfield (1982)
- A Charlie Brown Celebration (1982)
- Is This Goodbye, Charlie Brown? (1983)
- The Charlie Brown and Snoopy Show (1983, 1985)
- What Have We Learned, Charlie Brown? (1983)
- Garfield on the Town (1983)
- The Soldier's Tale (1984)
- Hello (1984)
- It's Flashbeagle, Charlie Brown (1984)
- Garfield in the Rough (1984)
- Snoopy's Getting Married, Charlie Brown (1985)
- It's Your 20th Television Anniversary, Charlie Brown (1985) (uncredited)
- Garfield's Halloween Adventure (1985)
- You're a Good Man, Charlie Brown (1985)
- Garfield in Paradise (1986)
- The Cosmic Eye (1986) (archive footage)
- Time of the Angels (1987)
- Garfield Goes Hollywood (1987)
- A Garfield Christmas Special (1987) (additional animation; uncredited)
- Madeline (1988)
- Snoopy: The Musical (1988)
- Garfield: His 9 Lives (1988) (segment "Stunt Cat"; also co-director)
- This Is America, Charlie Brown (1988)
- It's the Girl in the Red Truck, Charlie Brown (1988)
- The NASA Space Station (1988)
- Yes We Can (1989)
- Madeline's Christmas (1990)
- You Don't Look 40, Charlie Brown (1990) (uncredited)
- Why, Charlie Brown, Why? (1990)
- Amazonia (1990)
- Upside Down (1991)
- Snoopy's Reunion (1991)
- Tall Time Tales (1992)
- Tom and Jerry: The Movie (1992)
- It's Spring Training, Charlie Brown! (1992)
- Frosty Returns (1992)
- Mrs. Doubtfire (1993)
- Seers & Clowns (1994)
- Garfield and Friends (1994) (3 episodes)
- My Universe Inside Out (1996)
- Cloudland (1998)
- Rainbows of Hawai'i (1998)
- Our Spirited Earth (2000)
