= Winsor McCay Award =

Award for animation

The Winsor McCay Award is given to individuals in recognition of lifetime or career contributions to the art of animation in producing, directing, animating, design, writing, voice acting, sound and sound effects, technical work, music, professional teaching, and for other endeavors which exhibit outstanding contributions to excellence in animation.

== Background ==
The award is presented at the annual Annie Awards, presented by the International Animated Film Society, ASIFA-Hollywood. The award was established in 1972, and is named in honor of pioneer animator Winsor McCay.

== Recipients ==
- ^{†} Posthumously awarded

Year	Recipients
1972 (1st)	Max Fleischer^{†}, Dave Fleischer
1973 (2nd)	Walter Lantz
1974 (3rd)	Tex Avery, Friz Freleng, Chuck Jones, Art Babbitt, Winsor McCay^{†}
1975 (4th)	Grim Natwick, Walt Disney^{†}, John Hubley, Faith Hubley, Norman McLaren
1976 (5th)	Robert Cannon^{†}, Hugh Harman, Rudolf Ising, Mike Maltese, George Pal, Ward Kimball
1977 (6th)	Bill Hanna, Joe Barbera, Mel Blanc, Oskar Fischinger^{†}, Bill Scott, Milt Kahl
1978 (7th)	Jay Ward, Ub Iwerks^{†}, Dick Huemer, Carl Stalling^{†}, Hans Conried
1979 (8th)	Clyde Geronimi, Bill Melendez, Mae Questel, Otto Messmer
1980 (9th)	Ollie Johnston, Frank Thomas, Cal Howard, Paul Julian, Laverne Harding
1981 (10th)	T. Hee, Bill Peet, Bill Tytla^{†}, John Whitney, Ken Harris
1982 (11th)	Ken Anderson, Bruno Bozzetto, June Foray, Don Graham^{†}, Marc Davis
1983 (12th)	Eric Larson, Fred Moore^{†}, Clarence Nash, Wolfgang Reitherman, Leo Salkin, Stephen Bosustow^{†}, Wilfred Jackson
1984 (13th)	Daws Butler, David Hand, Jack Kinney, Michael Lah, Robert McKimson^{†}, Richard Williams, Hamilton Luske^{†}
1985 (14th)	Robert Abel, Preston Blair, Joe Grant, John Halas, Sterling Holloway, Jim McDonald, Phil Monroe, Ben Washam^{†}
1986 (15th)	Frederic Back, Shamus Culhane, William T. Hurtz, Irven Spence, Emery Hawkins, John Lounsbery^{†}
1987 (16th)	Paul Driessen, Jack Hannah, Bill Littlejohn, Maurice Noble, Ken O'Connor, Norman Ferguson^{†}, Mel Shaw
1988 (17th)	Ralph Bakshi, Bob Clampett^{†}, Tissa David, Kihachiro Kawamoto, Virgil Ross
1989–90 (18th)	Art Clokey, Hicks Lokey, Alex Lovy, Don Messick, Osamu Tezuka^{†}, Lester Novros
1991 (19th)	Ray Harryhausen, Herbert Klynn, Bob Kurtz, Yuri Norstein, Joe Siracusa, Ruth Kissane^{†}
1992 (20th)	Les Clark^{†}, Stan Freberg, David Hilberman
1993 (21st)	George Dunning^{†}, Roy E. Disney, Jack Zander
1994 (22nd)	Ed Benedict, Arthur Davis, Jean Vander Pyl
1995 (23rd)	Jules Engel, Vance Gerry, Dan McLaughlin
1996 (24th)	Mary Blair^{†}, Burny Mattinson, Iwao Takamoto
1997 (25th)	Willis O'Brien^{†}, Myron Waldman, Paul Winchell
1998 (26th)	Eyvind Earle, Hayao Miyazaki, Ernest Pintoff
1999 (27th)	Ray Patterson, Marcell Jankovics, Con Pederson
2000 (28th)	Norman McCabe, Hoyt Curtin, Lucille Bliss
2001 (29th)	Bill Justice, Pete Alvarado, Bob Givens
2002 (30th)	Gene Hazelton, Floyd Norman, Sherman Brothers
2003 (31st)	Gene Deitch, John Hench^{†}, Thurl Ravenscroft
2004 (32nd)	Don Bluth, Virginia Davis, Arnold Stang
2005 (33rd)	Corny Cole, Fred Crippen, Tyrus Wong
2006 (34th)	Andreas Deja, Genndy Tartakovsky, Bill Plympton
2007 (35th)	John Canemaker, Glen Keane, John Kricfalusi
2008 (36th)	Mike Judge, John Lasseter, Nick Park
2009 (37th)	Tim Burton, Jeffrey Katzenberg, Bruce Timm
2010 (38th)	Brad Bird, Eric Goldberg, Matt Groening
2011 (39th)	Walt Peregoy, Børge Ring, Ronald Searle^{†}
2012 (40th)	Terry Gilliam, Oscar Grillo, Mark Henn
2013 (41st)	Katsuhiro Otomo, Steven Spielberg, Phil Tippett
2014 (42nd)	Didier Brunner, Don Lusk, Lee Mendelson
2015 (43rd)	Joe Ranft^{†}, Phil Roman, Isao Takahata
2016 (44th)	Dale Baer, Caroline Leaf, Mamoru Oshii
2017 (45th)	James Baxter, Stephen Hillenburg, Wendy Tilby and Amanda Forbis
2018 (46th)	Ralph Eggleston, Andrea Romano, Frank Braxton^{†}
2019 (47th)	Satoshi Kon^{†}, Henry Selick, John Musker, Ron Clements
2020 (48th)	Willie Ito, Sue C. Nichols^{†}, Bruce W. Smith
2021 (49th)	Ruben A. Aquino, Lillian Schwartz, Toshio Suzuki
2022 (50th)	Pete Docter, Evelyn Lambart^{†}, Craig McCracken
2023 (51st)	Lotte Reiniger^{†}, Joe Hisaishi, Marcy Page
2024 (52nd)	Aaron Blaise, Eunice Macaulay^{†}, Normand Roger
2025 (53rd)	Phil Lord and Christopher Miller, Chris Sanders, Michaël Dudok de Wit

== See also ==
- List of animation awards
