= A Herb Alpert and the Tijuana Brass Double Feature =

1966 animated short film

- Directed by: John Hubley
- Story by: John Hubley; Faith Hubley
- Produced by: John Hubley; Faith Hubley
- Music by: Music Arranger: Herb Alpert; Songs: Bud Coleman; Julius Wechter
- Animation by: Gerard Baldwin; Phil Duncan; Emery Hawkins; Barrie Nelson; Rod Scribner; Ed Smith
- Color process: Color
- Production company: Hubley Studios
- Distributed by: Paramount Pictures
- Release date: April 1966 (U.S.)
- Running time: 5 minutes
- Country: United States

A Herb Alpert and the Tijuana Brass Double Feature is a 1966 animated short film featuring two songs from the Herb Alpert and the Tijuana Brass album Going Places. The film won the Academy Award for Best Animated Short Film in 1967. It was written and directed by John and Faith Hubley, who had previously won for Moonbird and The Hole. It is considered to be an early prototypical example of a music video, and has not been released onto home media.

== Film summary ==
"Spanish Flea" and "Tijuana Taxi" are soundtracks to two separate cartoons. In "Spanish Flea", a flea bothers various animals until it is chased away from them by a group of men. In "Tijuana Taxi", a rickety and old purple taxi in Tijuana picks up a disproportionate number of people who have to catch a plane at the local airport. After a crazy ride through the streets of Tijuana (including a short visit to a bullfighting arena), the taxi driver is delayed by a customs officer, who takes a long time in stamping the passports for the driver's numerous customers, and he misses the plane. However, he makes up for it by having his taxi fly away.

The music used to introduce the film during its opening credits is the band's "The Mexican Shuffle."

== Production ==
The film was distributed by Paramount Pictures. Emery Hawkins and Rod Scribner were among the animators who worked on the film.

== Film preservation ==
The Academy Film Archive preserved A Herb Alpert and the Tijuana Brass Double Feature in 2003.
