= Tissa David =

Romanian-born American animator (1921–2012)

Thérèse "Tissa" David (January 5, 1921 – August 21, 2012) was a Romanian-born American animator of Hungarian ethnicity, whose career spanned more than sixty years.

She was one of the pioneering women in animation, a field which had been dominated by male animators. Millimeter magazine described her as "one of the few women to have reached the top in the traditionally male-dominated animated cartoon field" and "one of the world's best and busiest" animators in a story published in 1975.

In 1953, David directed Bonjour Paris, becoming the second female animator to direct an animated feature film. David later became one of the first women to create and animate a major character in a film when she designed Raggedy Ann for the 1977 film, Raggedy Ann & Andy: A Musical Adventure.

== Biography ==
=== Early life ===
Born in 1921 in Cluj, Romania, to an ethnic Hungarian family, Thérèse "Tissa" David was the second oldest of her family's ten children. She first became interested in animation after watching the 1937 Walt Disney animated film, Snow White and the Seven Dwarfs.

David initially earned a degree as a teacher. She then enrolled at the Academy of Beaux Arts in Budapest. However, she dropped out of the school to begin her career as an assistant animator at Magyar Film Iroda, a Budapest studio. In 2002, she described seeing her first animation project as, "the most exciting moment in my life." She survived the bombings during the Siege of Budapest in 1944 by eating beans and horse meat. David became the co-owner of the Studio Mackassy and Trsi after the end of World War II, where she oversaw the animated productions.

=== Bonjour Paris ===
David moved to Paris, France, in March 1950 with her friend, Judit Reigl, to escape the Hungarian Communist authorities. She initially worked as a maid and cleaner in Paris while she learned French. David became the animation director and principal animator for the animated film, Bonjour Paris, after less than a year of living in Paris. She became the second woman to direct an animated feature film with her work on Bonjour Paris, which would be released in 1953. (The first female animator to direct an animated film was Lotte Reiniger.) David also worked for Paul Grimault and Jean Image, both of whom were film producers, while living in Paris.

=== Career in the United States ===
In 1955, David emigrated to the United States and learned English, settling in New York City. In 1956, David joined UPA, where she became the assistant of animator Grim Natwick. She first worked with Natwick while both were employed at UPA animation studio. David and Natwick later partnered for freelance work for hundreds of animated television commercials. David and Natwick also collaborated to create the last theatrical short released starring the character, Mr. Magoo.

Her television commercial portfolio, which spanned the 1950s, 1960s and 1970s, included spots for Piel's Beer, for which she drew the characters, Bert and Harry, who were voiced by Bob and Ray, an American comedy team. David also created animated commercials for Barneys New York, Vlasic Pickles, WQXR, Perrier, Esso and Shell, IBM, Cheerios and Excedrin.

David also worked on films, short films, and commercials with husband and wife animators, John Hubley and Faith Hubley, for Hubley Studios. Her credits with the Hubleys included Of Demons and Men and Eggs, both released in 1970, and the 1974 short film, Cockaboody. David animated the little girls in Cockaboody. In 1977 she animated on A Doonesbury Special.

She animated two characters, a man and a woman, for the Hubleys' 1976 independent animated film, Everybody Rides the Carousel. Actress Meryl Streep provided the voice for David's young woman in the film.

David, already an animation pioneer, became one of the first women to animate a major film character with the release of Raggedy Ann & Andy: A Musical Adventure in 1977. David animated the Raggedy Ann character for the film, which was directed by Richard Williams. She noted that "I project a lot of myself into Raggedy Ann." In 1977, David told the New York Times that she designed Raggedy Ann as "a plain Jane with a heart of candy – and she's all female." She elaborated on the production during the same interview saying, "If the work is good, then perhaps I will prove a point ... To create a female character in an animated film, you must think like a woman and 'feel' like a woman. In other words, you must be a woman."

David began animating for R.O. Blechman in the late 1970s. Her work with Blechman included television productions such as the television film Simple Gifts. In 1988, David was awarded the Winsor McCay Award during the Annie Awards.

David collaborated with Michael Sporn Animation later in her career, working on Sporn's 1990 adaptation of The Marzipan Pig, as well as Ira Sleeps Over, a 1991 animated television film. David also served as the animation director for Poe, based on the life of Edgar Allan Poe, which Sporn released in 2013.

== Death ==
David died from a brain tumor at her apartment on the Upper East Side of Manhattan, New York City, on August 21, 2012, at the age of 91.
