= Finian's Rainbow (disambiguation) =

Finian's Rainbow is a 1947 musical.

Finian's Rainbow may also refer to:

- Finian's Rainbow (unfinished film), an incomplete 1954 animated feature film
- Finian's Rainbow (1968 film), an American musical film
- Finian's Rainbow (album), a 1968 album by Stan Kenton
- Finian's Rainbow (horse), a British Thoroughbred racehorse
