= Art Babbitt =

American animator (1907–1992)

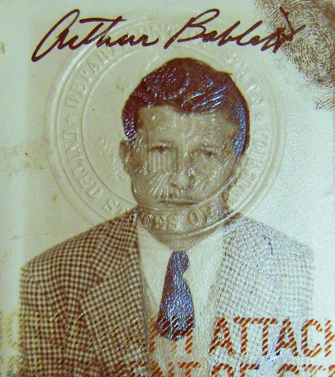
- Babbitt's passport photo c. 1940s
- Born: Arthur Harold Babitsky; October 8, 1907; Omaha, Nebraska, U.S.
- Died: March 4, 1992 (aged 84); Los Angeles, California, U.S.
- Other name: Arthur Babbitt
- Occupation: Animator
- Years active: 1928–1992
- Employer(s): Terrytoons (1929–1932); Walt Disney Productions (1932–1941; 1945–1948); Leon Schlesinger Productions/Warner Bros. Cartoons (1941–1945); UPA (1948–1955); Lou Bunin Films (1949); Storyboard/Hubley Studios, Inc./Quartet Films (1955–1977); Hanna-Barbera (1957–1992); Richard Williams Productions (1967–1992)
- Spouses: Marge Champion (m. 1937; div. 1940) Dina Gottliebová (m. 1949; div. 1963) Barbara Perry (m. 1967)
- Children: 2

Arthur Harold Babitsky (October 8, 1907 – March 4, 1992), better known as Art Babbitt, was an American animator, best known for his work at the Walt Disney Productions animation unit. He received over 80 awards as an animation director and animator, and also developed the character of Goofy. Babbitt worked as an animator or animation director on films such as Snow White and the Seven Dwarfs, Pinocchio, Fantasia and Dumbo, among others.

== Early life ==
Babbitt was born to a Jewish family in the Little Bohemia section of Omaha, Nebraska, but moved to Sioux City, Iowa after he finished kindergarten. After graduating from Sioux City Central High in 1924 at the age of 16, Art decided to move to New York to take on the role of breadwinner after his father had an accident on duty and became paralyzed as a result.

== Career ==
Art Babbitt began his career in New York City working for Paul Terry's Terrytoons studio. But in the early 1930s he moved to Los Angeles followed by his fellow Terrytoon colleague Bill Tytla, and secured a job animating for the Walt Disney Studio, which was expanding at the time.

=== Disney Studio ===
Babbitt began his career at Disney as an assistant animator, but his talent was spotted and he was soon promoted to animator. His first important work was a drunken mouse in the short The Country Cousin (1936), which won an Academy Award for the studio.

At the Disney Studio, Babbitt animated the Wicked Queen in Snow White and the Seven Dwarfs, a job described by Disney animator Andreas Deja as "one of the toughest assignments" on the film. While he was working on Snow White, he met his first wife, Marjorie Belcher, a dance model whose live-action performance was used as reference material by the animators for the role of Snow White.

On the film Pinocchio, Babbitt animated the character of Geppetto, and became a directing animator. Of all Disney's films, Pinocchio was the feature which Babbitt most admired, and which he regarded as the finest achievement of the studio during the "Golden Age" of animation. Babbitt also animated the characters of the Dancing Mushrooms, Dancing Thistles, Dancing Orchids, Zeus, Vulcan, and Boreas in Fantasia. On the feature film Dumbo, Babbitt was again made a directing animator, and animated the character of the stork. When animating the stork, he made him resemble his voice actor, Sterling Holloway. Babbitt is also credited with developing the character of Goofy, a character which he later described in the 1987 documentary film Animating Art:

Goofy was someone who never really knew how stupid he was. He thought long and carefully before he did anything, and then he did it wrong.

He had previously expounded on Goofy’s nature in a 1930s memo:

Think of the Goof as a composite of an everlasting optimist, a gullible Good Samaritan, a half-wit, a shiftless, good-natured colored boy and a hick. His brain is rather vapory.

During the 1930s Babbitt rose to become one of Disney's best-paid artists, and enjoyed a lavish lifestyle despite the austerity of the Great Depression:

I was living the Life of Riley. I didn't realize how fortunate I was. I was earning a very good salary. I had two servants, a large house, and three cars. You know, what in the world was I going to do with three cars?

However, despite this prosperity, in 1940 he and his wife Marjorie were divorced.

=== Cartoonist strike ===
Despite being one of the highest paid animators at Disney, Babbitt was sympathetic to the cause of lower echelon Disney artists seeking to form a union. Most of the strikers were in-betweeners, cel painters, and other less-well paid employees, who in 1941 began industrial action in pursuit of better working conditions. As a top animator, Babbitt was one of relatively few well-paid artists to join the strike, and he became one of the strike leaders. One morning, as Disney drove through picketing workers on his way to the studio, Babbitt heckled him through a bullhorn. Disney exited his car to confront him, and a fistfight was only prevented by the intervention of others.

For his part in the strike, Babbitt earned Walt Disney's enmity. Disney was forced to rehire Babbitt after the strike was over, along with many other strikers, but by then the two men disliked one another. Babbitt worked with director Jack Kinney, another "Goofy man" (meaning that they worked together on the Goofy shorts), as Disney began to look for ways to be rid of Babbitt. "If he gets in your way, let me know", Disney said to Kinney. Babbitt was fired more than once but was reinstated upon winning his court case in the United States Court of Appeals for the Ninth Circuit, which became final when the Supreme Court of the United States declined Disney's appeal.

=== WWII ===
Babbitt moved to Leon Schlesinger Productions, where he worked for Bob Clampett's unit for a month. After serving with the U.S. Marines in the Pacific War during World War II, Babbitt returned to Disney for a time, following an "unfair labor practices" suit brought by Babbitt against Disney. Disney was forced to rehire him after the war, but Babbitt did not stay long.

=== Career after Disney ===
Along with some other former Disney strikers, Babbitt left Disney and went to join the United Productions of America (UPA), a new studio which pioneered a modern, simplified form of animation. He worked on many of their famous award-winning shorts, including the lead character Frankie in "Rooty Toot-Toot" (1951), and won many awards. In the 1950s he was a founder and part owner of Quartet Films, where he worked on television commercials, including the Cleo-winning "John & Marsha" spot for Parkay Margarine. Later he was part of Hanna-Barbera's commercial wing.

Known in the animation world as one of the art's most accomplished teachers, in 1973 Canadian animator Richard Williams brought Babbitt to his London studio in Soho Square to deliver a series of lectures on animation acting and technique that subsequently became famous among animators. Some of Babbitt's final work was on the characters King Nod and Phido, the vulture, in Williams' film The Thief and the Cobbler. He also animated the Camel with Wrinkled Knees in William's Raggedy Ann and Andy: A Musical Adventure.

In 1991, Disney chief Roy E. Disney, the nephew of Walt, contacted Babbitt and they ended the long feud. Babbitt died of kidney failure on March 4, 1992. Babbitt's former rivals, the pro-Walt animators Frank Thomas and Ollie Johnston, gave Babbitt a warm and moving eulogy at his funeral service. He was interred in the Forest Lawn Memorial Park (Hollywood Hills).

== Family life and legacy ==
His first wife (1937–1940) was Marge Champion, then Belcher, a dance model in Snow White and the Seven Dwarfs. They had met when Champion was fourteen years old, and married three years later when she was seventeen and he was twenty-nine.

His second wife was Dina Babbitt, an artist and a Holocaust survivor. He had two daughters with Dina, L. Michele Babbitt and Karin Wendy Babbitt. His third wife until his death was actress Barbara Perry. His step-daughter from Barbara is Laurel James. In the late 1980s, a British television documentary titled Animating Art was broadcast, celebrating Babbitt's life and work. The documentary was produced and directed by Imogen Sutton (Richard Williams' wife), and features extensive interviews with Babbitt and his then employer, Williams. Babbitt was posthumously named a Disney Legend in 2007.

The Academy Film Archive holds a small collection of personal films belonging to Babbitt. The archive has preserved a number of Babbitt's home movies from this collection, including one of the 1938 Academy Awards.

== Filmography ==
Year	Title	Credits	Characters
1937	Snow White and the Seven Dwarfs	Animator	Evil Queen / Doc
1940	Pinocchio	Animation Director	Geppetto
1940	Fantasia	Animator - Segment "The Nutcracker Suite" / Animation Supervisor - Segment "The Pastoral Symphony"	Various
1941	Dumbo	Animation Director	Mr. Stork
1943	The Wise Quacking Duck (Short)	Animator	
1947	Bootle Beetle (Short)	Animator	
1947	Fun and Fancy Free	Character Animator	Bongo
1947	Foul Hunting (Short)	Animator	
1949	Ragtime Bear (Short)	Animator	
1950	Giddyap (Short)	Director	
1950	The Popcorn Story	Director	
1951	The Family Circus (Short)	Director / Animator	
1951	Barefaced Flatfoot (Short)	Animator	
1951	Fuddy Duddy Buddy (Short)	Animator	
1951	Grizzly Golfer (Short)	Animator	
1951	Rooty Toot Toot (Short)	Animator	
1952	The Four Poster (Short)	Animator	
1953	Job Evaluation and Merit Rating (Short)	Director	
1958	Date with Dizzy (Short)	Animator	
1964	The Nut House!! (TV Movie)	Animator	
1966	The Lone Ranger (TV Series)	Director	
1969	Of Men and Demons (Short)	Animator	
1976	Everybody Rides the Carousel	Animator	
1977	Raggedy Ann & Andy: A Musical Adventure	Animator: The Camel with the Wrinkled Knees	
1988	Animating Art (TV Movie documentary)	Himself	
1988	The South Bank Show (TV Series documentary)	Thanks - 1 Episode "The Art of Walt Disney"	
1993	The Thief and the Cobbler	Lead Animator	
2012	Persistence of Vision (Documentary)	Himself	
