= Of Stars and Men =

1964 film by John Hubley

- Opening titles
- Directed by: John Hubley
- Written by: Harlow Shapley (original book)
- Produced by: John Hubley; Faith Hubley
- Starring: Mark Hubley; Hampy Hubley
- Narrated by: Harlow Shapley
- Distributed by: Brandon Films
- Release dates: April 28, 1964 (New York City premiere); May 13, 1964 (general release)
- Running time: 53 minutes
- Country: United States
- Language: English

Of Stars and Men is a 1964 American animated documentary film directed by John Hubley, based on the 1959 book of the same title by astronomer Harlow Shapley, who also narrates. It was produced by Hubley and Faith Hubley and has been cited as an example of an "animated documentary".

== Premise ==
The film tells, in documentary style, of humankind's quest (in the form of a child) to find its place in the universe, through themes such as outer space, physical matter, the meaning of life and the periodic table.

== Release ==
The film was first screened during a conference at MIT's Visual Department. The film's public premiere was on April 28, 1964, at New York's Beekman Theater, along with a collection of Hubley/U.P.A. shorts (Moonbird and Gerald McBoing-Boing among them) which preceded its showing.

== Reception ==
The critical reception was uniformly positive.

Variety wrote: "John and Faith Hubley have concocted a beguiling, absorbing animated look at man and his place in the universe in this medium length pic. ... Shapley's concise and friendly commentary, delivered by himself, and the clear and expert visuals make the points with eye appeal and investiveness. Humor is also laced into it. Animation is deft as well as creative with a fine employment of color. It is an excellent use of the medium."

Boxoffice wrote: "John Hubley, who helped create the tremendously fascinating Mr. Magoo ... has teamed with his equally talented wife, Faith, in a meticulous adaptation of scientist Harlow Shapley's (he doubles as narrator) book, which thoughtfully explored the status of modern man in the universe."

TV Guide wrote: "Evolution and man's place in the universe are explored in this charming animated fable. ... Though the ideas expressed in the story are familiar, the presentation is pure visual delight. The stylized pictures are brimming with humor and also carry a touch of pathos.

== Disputes about genre ==
The film's genre was a matter of contention among festival curators: at the Venice Film Festival, Of Stars and Men was placed in the live-action feature category, while at the San Francisco Film Festival, it competed in the documentary category and won an award.

== Home media ==
Of Stars and Men received a VHS release from Buena Vista Home Video in July 1990, and had its DVD debut from Image Entertainment nine years later, as part of a compilation of Hubley productions.

== See also ==
- List of American films of 1964
- The Cosmic Eye, a 1987 film from the Hubleys
- List of animated feature-length films
