= Finian's Rainbow (unfinished film) =

Finian's Rainbow was an incomplete 1954 animated feature film, being an adaptation of the musical Finian's Rainbow. It began production in 1954 directed by John Hubley. The crew included Art Babbit, Bill Tytla and Paul Julian.

Among the cast were Frank Sinatra, Ella Fitzgerald, Oscar Peterson, Louis Armstrong, Barry Fitzgerald, Jim Backus and David Burns plus David Wayne and Ella Logan from the original Broadway production.

The film ran into difficulty due to Hubley and Harburg's refusal to testify before the House Committee on Un-American Activities. The film was abandoned.

Some recordings survive along with several sketches.
