= Frank Braxton =

African-American animator and director

Frank Cavalier Braxton Jr. (March 31, 1929 – June 1, 1969) was an African-American animator and director active in the early 1950s to the late 1960s. He was one of the first black animators hired by both Disney and Warner Bros.

== Life ==
=== Career ===
Frank C. Braxton Jr. was born on March 31, 1929. As a little boy, he developed an enthusiasm for drawing and was known for carrying his sketchbook around, capturing images of the 1930s and 40s L.A. As a senior at Manual Arts High School, he filled the 1947 yearbook with his depiction of school life.

Braxton made his first attempt in the early 1950s, when he was hired by Disney as a trainee and let go within a few months.

Shortly after that, Braxton restarted his animator career at Warner Bros., alongside Ben Washam. Braxton and Washam were first encountered in the singing classes of Lee Wintner at LA City College. Washam, at that time, was an animator in Chuck Jones' unit at Warner Bros. Washam immediately recognized Braxton's work when the enthusiastic Braxton showed him his portfolio. To guarantee Braxton would get hired at Warner Bros., Washam even created a rumor of how the company was racist and not hiring black animators to anger Eddie Selzer, the head of the studio.

Without any animation experience, Braxton spent his first two years in the company as a beginner and learnt the art form with other new hires. Braxton soon earned himself the position of Washam's assistant when he gradually fulfilled his art talent, thus many works of Chuck Jones' unit in the mid-1950s contain contributions by Braxton. After he left Chuck Jones' unit and Warner Bros., he worked under animation director Bill Hurtz and once managed a cartoon studio in Barcelona, Spain.

Back in the United States, Braxton started to gain success as an animator. He was working in animation at MGM on theatrical Tom & Jerry shorts and directing The Bullwinkle Show and Mr. Magoo. In 1960, he became the president of the Screen Cartoonist's Guild, making him the first black president of any Hollywood film union. Braxton's mentor Washam, who had been a two-term union president himself, encouraged Braxton to be more interactive with the union.

In 1967, Braxton was involved in the production of the comic strip the Peanuts specials. In the same year, he animated the Charlie Brown TV specials You’re in Love, Charlie Brown and He’s Your Dog, Charlie Brown under his Warner-alumnus Bill Melendez. He was also the director for Jay Ward's latest TV series, George of the Jungle and on early Cap'n Crunch cereal commercials.

In 1969, Braxton died of cancer at age 40, and he was buried at Evergreen Cemetery in Los Angeles. His last animated project, A Boy Named Charlie Brown, was released in the same year.

=== Legacy ===
On February 2, 2019, Braxton was granted the Winsor McCay Award from ASIFA (the International Animated Film Association) “in recognition of lifetime or career contributions to the art of animation.”
