= Maypo =

American brand of hot cereal

- Marky Maypo, the mascot for Maypo
- Type: Porridge
- Course: Breakfast
- Place of origin: United States
- Main ingredients: Oatmeal

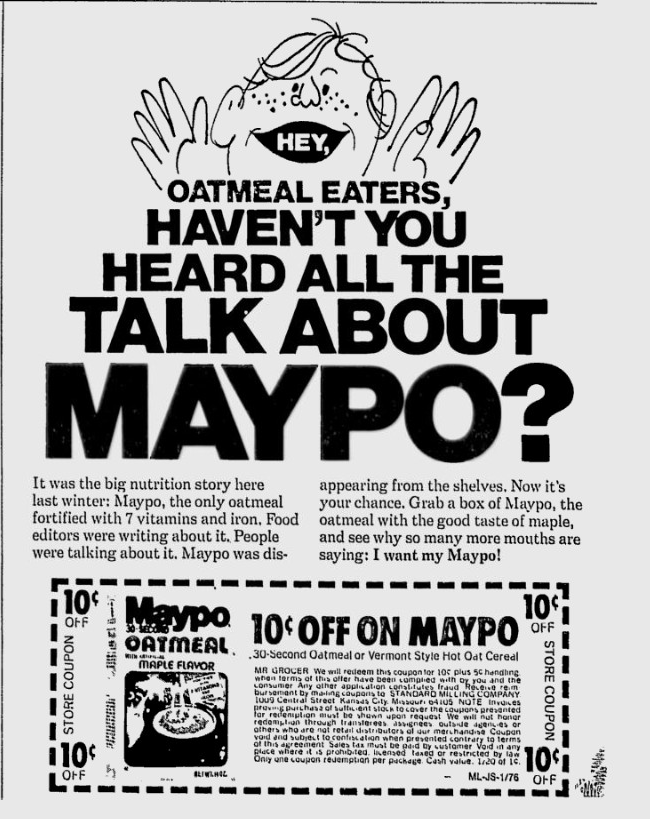
1976 magazine ad for Maypo.

Maypo is an American brand of hot cereals. The original product was maple flavored oatmeal but there are now a variety of flavors sold under the Maypo brand name. It was originally manufactured by Maltex Co. and is now owned by Homestat Farm, Ltd. It was best known for its television commercials with the catchphrase, "I Want My Maypo" by Marky Maypo.

== History ==
Maypo was developed by the Maltex Corporation in Burlington, Vermont, a company that had been manufacturing wheat and barley cereal since 1899 under the name Malted Cereals Company. Maypo was first marketed in 1951.

Shortly after the development of Maypo, Maltex was sold in 1956 and became a division of Heublein. By the mid-1960s its market share had declined and Maltex was sold to American Home Products. In 2001 Homestat Farm, Ltd. purchased Maypo.

== Advertising ==
The original "I Want My Maypo" ad was developed in 1956 by the Fletcher, Richards, Calkins & Holden Advertising Agency. The animation was done by Emery Hawkins, and produced by John Hubley’s studio. The commercial, which appealed to children, increased sales on average 78%, with some markets increasing sales by 186%.

Maypo's later television ads sometimes featured athletes—including Mickey Mantle, Wilt Chamberlain and Johnny Unitas—crying "I want my Maypo!"

== In popular culture ==
MTV's "I want my MTV!" image and branding campaign in 1982 was based on the "I want my Maypo!" catchphrase; both were developed by George Lois.

A Maypo commercial is seen on a television screen in the 1999 animated film The Iron Giant. In the 2015 Signature Edition, it was replaced with a commercial advertising Disney's Tomorrowland attraction.

== See also ==
- Cream of Wheat
- List of porridges
- Malt-O-Meal
