= Zuckerkandl! =

Zuckerkandl! is a comic book published in 1968. It was written by Robert Maynard Hutchins and illustrated by John Hubley. The book profiles the philosophy of the fictitious Austrian thinker Dr. Alexander Zuckerkandl and satirizes his philosophy of disentanglement. Resembling a fairy tale in form, Zuckerkandl! has been interpreted as a parody of Freud, though it explicitly contrasts the philosophy of Freud (requiring the plumbing of the unconscious by the conscious) with the philosophy of Zuckerkandl (replacing conscious thought altogether by living habitually). As such, it blames Zuckerkandl (and by extension, according to Vincent Canby, Freud) for the ills of modern society. The comic book is based on John Hubley's animated film which, itself, was based on a humorous lecture.
