= Rooty Toot Toot =

- Directed by: John Hubley
- Story by: John Hubley; Bill Scott
- Produced by: Stephen Bosustow (executive producer); John Hubley (producer)
- Starring: Thurl Ravenscroft (Johnny), Annette Warren (Frankie and Nellie Bly), Bill Lee (Attorney)
- Music by: Alan Alch (lyrics); Phil Moore (music)
- Animation by: Art Babbitt; Pat Matthews; Tom McDonald; Grim Natwick
- Layouts by: Paul Julian
- Color process: Technicolor
- Production company: United Productions of America
- Distributed by: Columbia Pictures
- Release date: November 10, 1951
- Running time: 7 minutes
- Country: United States
- Language: English

Rooty Toot Toot is a 1951 American black comedy musical film noir cartoon directed by John Hubley. It was released by Columbia Pictures and produced by UPA. Annette Warren provides the voices of both Frankie and Nelly Bly. Thurl Ravenscroft is the voice of Johnny and Honest John the Crook.

The film is an adaptation of the song "Frankie and Johnny", a murder ballad. In the song, a woman shoots her unfaithful lover. The film depicts her trial for murder. Her crooked lawyer manages to have her declared not guilty, and expresses an interest in marrying his client. When she sees the lawyer walking away with another woman, the defendant kills him in front of witnesses.

== Summary ==
The short retells the classic popular song "Frankie and Johnny". Frankie is on trial for the murder of her piano-playing lover, Johnny. The prosecuting attorney accuses her of shooting Johnny "rooty toot toot/right in the snoot". Nellie Bly the singer ("That's a lie! That's a lie! She's no singer!" shouts Frankie) claims she witnessed the shooting.

The case is looking bad for Frankie until her lawyer, Honest John the Crook, spins a wild story involving innocent Frankie, a spurned and jealous Johnny, and an incredible ricochet. Honest John then declares that if Frankie were free, he would take her for his wife. The jury convenes and finds Frankie "not guilty". Frankie is thrilled, until she sees Honest John walking away with Nellie Bly.

She quickly picks up Exhibit A (the gun) and shoots Honest John "rooty toot toot/right in the snoot" in front of the entire court room. The prosecuting attorney celebrates as the police escort Frankie to jail.

== Reception and legacy ==
It received a nomination for the Academy Award for Best Animated Short Film in 1951, but lost out to Tom and Jerry's 6th award-winning cartoon The Two Mouseketeers.

In 1994 it was voted #41 of the 50 Greatest Cartoons of all time by members of the animation field.
