= I Want My Maypo =

Advertising Slogan

"I Want My Maypo" was an advertising slogan used by Maltex Company of Burlington, Vermont. It was used to advertise Maypo, a brand of maple flavored oatmeal starting in the 1950s.

== Overview ==
The Maltex Company marketed Maltex Cereal, a combination of toasted wheat and malted barley, for years. It developed Maypo maple-flavored hot oat cereal in 1950, but sales remained minuscule in comparison to its competitors. At the time of the "I Want My Maypo" ad, Maltex became a subsidiary of Connecticut-based Heublein Inc. When the brand was not selling well, Maypo advertisers decided to push the product very heavily using advertising. The result was the famous Maypo commercial featuring the character 'Marky Maypo.'

The black and white animated commercial was sixty seconds long. The setting was a breakfast table with Uncle Ralph trying to get his nephew, Marky, to eat his new 'surprise' cereal. However, Marky seems more interested in wearing his cowboy hat than eating the oatmeal. The frustrated Uncle grabbed the hat from Marky, who demanded it back, refusing that he wouldn't eat the oatmeal otherwise. Then, the Uncle resorts to pretending that a spoonful of Maypo is an airplane and Marky's mouth is the hangar, but accidentally puts the spoon in his own mouth, and liked the taste. Marky then grabbed a spoonful of Maypo and ate it greedily. As the uncle then eagerly ate the rest of the oatmeal, Marky yelled "I Want My Maypo!"

The commercial would not only turn Marky Maypo into a household name, but would also produce phenomenal increases in sales of Maypo cereal. Sponsor Magazine reported that the new advertising campaign led to sales increases, "an average of 78 percent . . . and as high as 186 percent in some markets." The ad also led to a new package design that featured Marky prominently as a new logo.

The "I Want My Maypo" ad was selected as one of the 69 classic commercials to be awarded a Clio Award by the American Television Festival and Forum. It was conceived and produced by John Hubley. The agency for the ad was Fletcher Richards, Calkins & Holden, Inc.

== See also ==
- I want my MTV, a similar slogan based on the Maypo ad.
