= Rod Scribner =

American animator (1910–1976)

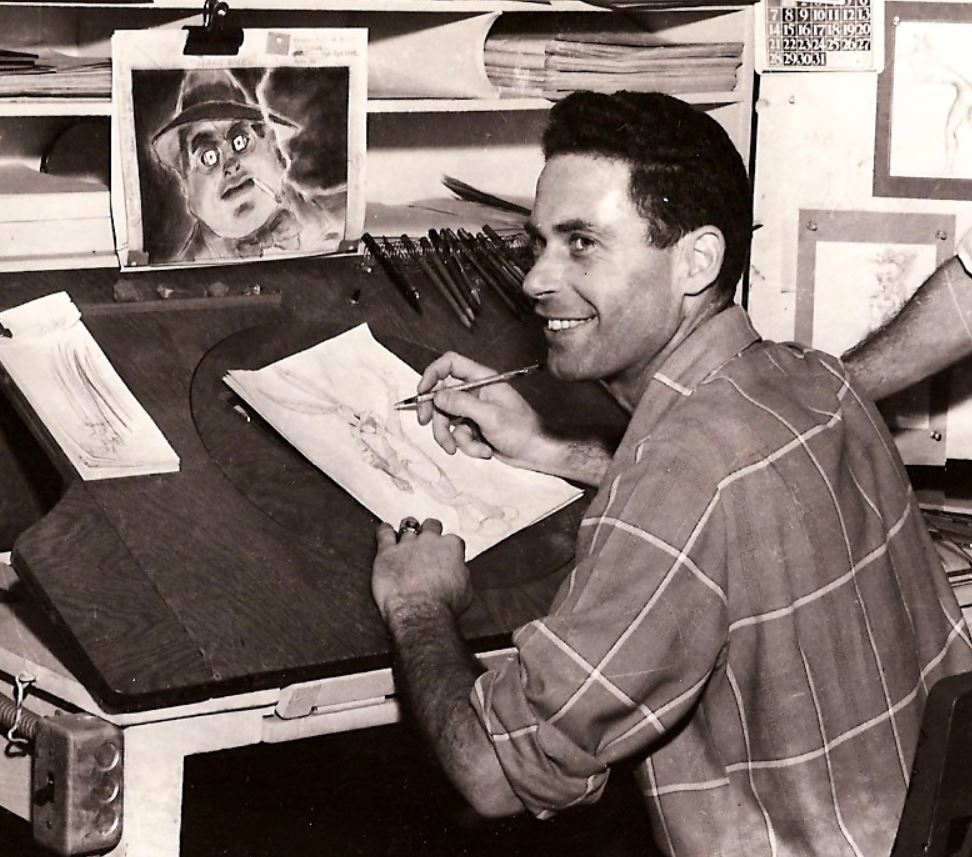
- Rod Scribner drawing Bugs Bunny in 1945.
- Born: Roderick Henry Scribner; October 10, 1910; Joseph, Oregon, U.S.
- Died: December 21, 1976 (aged 66); Patton, California, U.S.
- Other names: Roderick Scribner; Harry Scribner
- Occupation: Animator
- Years active: 1935–1976
- Employers: Warner Bros. Cartoons (1935–1947); (Note: Scribner took a 3 year hiatus in a hospital due to him contracting tuberculosis, in which he didn't come back to the studio until March 1948.) (1950–1953 (Note: The studio laid off employees, including Scribner, in '53, due to the 3D movie fad at the time)); Storyboard/Hubley Studios, Inc. (1955–1956; 1966–1967); UPA (1956); Cascade Studios (1964–1965); Jay Ward Productions (1967); Bakshi Productions (1972); Hanna-Barbera (1973); Bill Melendez Productions (1972–1976)
- Spouse: Jane Bannister Kiesner (m. 1938)
- Children: 3

Roderick Henry Scribner (October 10, 1910 – December 21, 1976) was an American animator. He was best known for his work on the Looney Tunes and Merrie Melodies series of cartoons from Warner Bros. Cartoons. He worked during the Golden age of American animation. He famously becomes known for Tweety, Bugs Bunny, and Daffy Duck.

== Early life ==
Scribner had an interest in drawing in high school. Drawing was one of his subjects (along with English and political science) when he attended Denison University for three years. Later, after an interlude spent as a manager of a "hunting marsh", he studied art in Toledo, Ohio, and at the Chouinard Art Institute before he joined the Schlesinger animation staff.

== Career ==
=== Warner Bros. Cartoons ===
Scribner started as an assistant animator for Friz Freleng's unit in 1935, then as a animator for Ben Hardaway and Cal Dalton (and, briefly, Chuck Jones). Following the dissolution of Hardaway and Dalton's unit in 1939, he joined Tex Avery's unit and worked with Robert McKimson, Charles McKimson, Virgil Ross, and Sid Sutherland.

Tokyo Woes, a World War II era cartoon released in 1945 for the US Navy. Directed by Clampett, it is animated by Scribner, along with Manny Gould and Robert McKimson, with the loose Lichty style that Scribner proposed. It also features some stereotypes of Japanese people, which was common during the war.

In late 1941, after Tex Avery left to direct Speaking of Animals and Their Families for Jerry Fairbanks and Paramount Pictures, he was replaced as the unit director by Bob Clampett. Scribner's animation matched Clampett's expansive and energetic cartoons. This was caused by Scribner animating in ink with a pen or a brush, and since Scribner's animation, in Bill Melendez's words, was "very bold and kind of dirty", it would cause crises in the Ink and Paint Department, and the women had to choose which lines to trace. Clampett classics such as A Tale of Two Kitties (1942), Coal Black and de Sebben Dwarfs (1943), and The Great Piggy Bank Robbery (1946) showcase some of his trademark "Lichty style" of animation, which he proposed to Clampett. Clampett left Warner Bros. in 1946 to pursue a career in puppetry and television. Following Clampett's departure, Scribner was transferred to the unit of recently-promoted fellow Clampett alumnus Robert McKimson, although Scribner would only animate on a small number of shorts prior to being hospitalized in late 1946.

He briefly was a cartoonist on Happy Comic's Rowdy Runner and a January 1945 issue of a military magazine called "Service Ribbin". There are some claims from Scribner's family that Chuck Jones stole the Road Runner from Scribner, including a claim from Scribner's son Ty, who claims that he saw a Coyote chasing a Road Runner and that Scribner "pitched" it to Jones, although this claim is very unlikely and dubious since Scribner was at McKimson's unit.

After three years of hospitalization due to tuberculosis, Scribner returned to Warner Bros. in 1950 under Robert McKimson's unit. His animation became noticeably more subdued during this period owing to both McKimson's more rigid directorial standards and Scribner's own deteriorated physical state, but he still got away with energetic scenes, like in Hillbilly Hare (1950), Hoppy Go Lucky (1952) and Of Rice and Hen (1953).

According to Warner Bros. animator Lloyd Turner in an interview, Scribner frequently engaged in behavior perceived as "crazy", recollecting Scribner to have burned his house down, and that he had a disdain towards his colleague Arthur Davis, potentially because Davis replaced Clampett after his departure. Resultantly, Scribner played a lot of pranks on Davis at McKimson's unit, inclusive of a notable incident Turner recounted within the interview in which Scribner, sighting Davis on a telephone line in a phone booth, elbowed Turner with a "watch me fix Davis", ran to the other side of the booth and tipped the telephone into a 45-degree angle, leading it to emit a booming sound disconcertingly similar to a bomb. Having successfully alarmed Davis, Scribner tipped the phone back, ran and, according to Turner "laughed like he was possessed", inciting Davis' wrath when he emerged from the booth. Clampett described him as a mischievous elf.

=== Later career ===
Scribner was laid off from Warner's in 1953 and worked for UPA, Cascade Studios, Jay Ward and Storyboard Inc. from the 50's to the mid 60's. In his later years, Scribner worked with former colleague Bill Melendez on various Charlie Brown movies and television specials that worked in Snoopy Come Home (1972), There's No Time for Love, Charlie Brown (1973) and It's the Easter Beagle, Charlie Brown (1974), eventually starting at a studio called Playhouse Pictures, which produced commercials for over 45 years. His only completed work not associated with UPA or his former colleague Melendez is a 1968 training video for IBM called A Computer Glossary and two credits on the first two episodes of Yogi's Gang. Scribner went to work on Fritz the Cat at Bakshi Studios, but eventually sat down with Bakshi and tearfully proclaimed that he "can't do this anymore". Scribner's deteriorated mental state had rendered his work unusable (with Bakshi describing his drawings as "absolutely hideous"), and most of his animation was thrown out or overhauled as a result. Scribner died a few months after leaving the studio, and Bakshi regarded his departure as the "saddest experience of his life”.

== Death and legacy ==
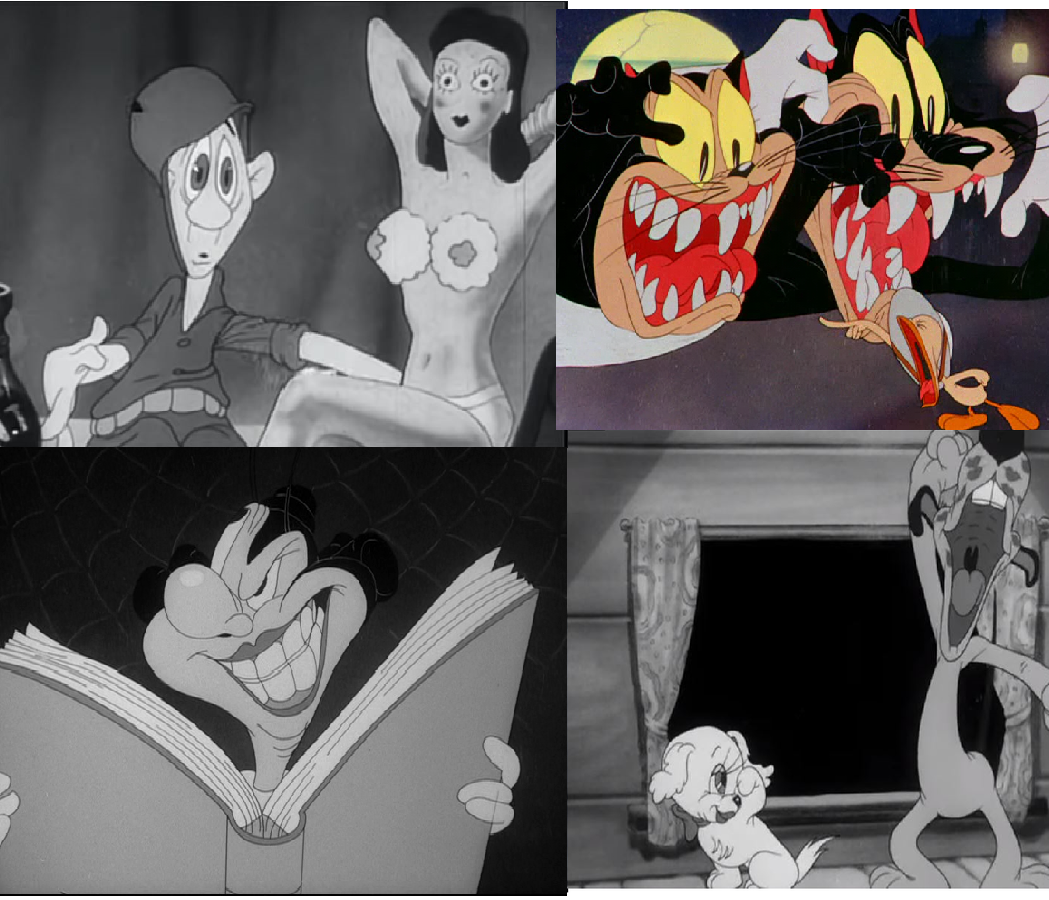
After Scribner's death, many people in the animation industry praised his work. (examples shown)

After being arrested and put on suicide watch in Patton State Hospital, Scribner died there on December 21, 1976, from tuberculosis, which he had contracted during World War II in 1945 during the production of One Meat Brawl and due to an outbreak of the disease during the war, in which he didn't return to Warners until March 1948. His last project was Race For Your Life, Charlie Brown, released posthumously in Summer 1977. Bill Plympton says his work on Coal Black "is a masterpiece of animation and distortion" and that the animation in the Clampett cartoons blew his mind. Cartoon Brew puts him on Number 18 on the list of "25 Great Cartoonists You Should Know". Animator John Kricfalusi is a self-described "fanatic" for Scribner.

== Partial filmography ==
=== Warner Bros. ===
- A Tale of Two Kitties
- Hare Ribbin'
- All This and Rabbit Stew
- A Corny Concerto
- The Great Piggy Bank Robbery
- Private Snafu
- Of Rice and Hen
- The Night Watchman
- Falling Hare
- Gruesome Twosome
- Russian Rhapsody
- Draftee Daffy
- A Wild Hare
- The Prize Pest
- Quack Shot
- An Itch in Time
- Porky's Hare Hunt
- A-Lad-In Bagdad
- Tortoise Wins by a Hare
- Bars and Stripes Forever
- Nutty News

=== Commercials ===
- Kool Aid (1964–65) (mostly directed by Tex Avery and features Bugs and Elmer)
- Hawaiian Punch (1961–1975)
- Cheerios with Rocky and Bullwinkle (1960s)
- Bank of America
- Foremost
- ABC Saturday Morning

=== John Hubley ===
- A Herb Alpert and the Tijuana Brass Double Feature
- Urbanissimo

=== Jay Ward Productions ===
- George of the Jungle

=== Bakshi Productions ===
- Fritz the Cat

=== Bill Melendez Productions ===
- Race For Your Life, Charlie Brown
- Snoopy Come Home
- There's No Time for Love, Charlie Brown
- It's the Easter Beagle, Charlie Brown
