= The Marzipan Pig =

Children's book by Russell Hoban

First edition (publ. Jonathan Cape)

The Marzipan Pig (1986, ISBN 0-374-34859-6) is a children's book by Russell Hoban. The plot involves a marzipan pig that has somehow fallen behind a couch, and a chain of reactions that occur because of his existence.

== Plot summary ==
A marzipan pig, having fallen behind a couch, laments being forgotten. Even as dust begins to cover him, he remains hopeful about being found. When he is eventually discovered by a mouse, she eats him, and parts of his personality are transferred onto her. The mouse, in turn, falls in love with a nearby grandfather clock and comes to visit him each night. The clock does not reciprocate the mouse's love and ignores her. One night the mouse disappears for good. The clock suddenly feels the loss and desperately awaits her return. When he is next wound up, his spring breaks.

Unbeknownst to the clock, the mouse has been eaten by an owl. Just as the marzipan pig's personality had transferred onto the mouse, the owl inherits the mouse's traits, and he falls in love with a lighted taxi meter and dances for rides. Later, where the mouse was eaten, a little pink flower grows up. A bee drinks the flower's nectar and shows its affection to a dying hibiscus flower. A snooty white mouse thinks she'd make a better hibiscus and uses the dead petals to make a dress. She finds a package with a new marzipan pig - one without any knowledge of love or loneliness. The mouse eats the new marzipan pig and falls asleep. The little boy who lives in the house opens the package, and finds only the mouse, who escapes back into her hole. The boy tells his mother that he saw a mouse in a pink dress, though his mother doesn't believe him. The mouse is not eaten by the owl that night. Having been enlightened by her misadventures, she is instead seen dancing outside in the moonlight by the Albert Bridge.

== Animated version ==
The story has been adapted in an animated television film, produced and directed by Michael Sporn. The adaptation was animated by Tissa David and narrated by Tim Curry. The half-hour special premiered on HBO on November 5, 1990, as part of their HBO Storybook Musicals series.
