= The Four Poster (1952 film) =

1952 film by Irving Reis

- Theatrical release poster
- Directed by: Irving Reis
- Screenplay by: Jan de Hartog; Allan Scott
- Based on: The Fourposter by Jan de Hartog
- Produced by: Stanley Kramer
- Starring: Rex Harrison; Lilli Palmer
- Cinematography: Hal Mohr
- Edited by: Henry Batista
- Music by: Dimitri Tiomkin
- Production company: The Stanley Kramer Company
- Distributed by: Columbia Pictures
- Release date: October 15, 1952 (New York)
- Running time: 103 minutes
- Country: United States
- Language: English
- Budget: $150,000

The Four Poster is a 1952 American comedy-drama film directed by Irving Reis and starring real-life married couple Rex Harrison and Lilli Palmer.

The plot follows the married life of John and Abby Edwards from their honeymoon through their final years.

== Cast ==
- Rex Harrison as John Edwards
- Lilli Palmer as Abby Edwards

== Production ==
The screenplay is an adaptation of Jan de Hartog's 1951 play The Fourposter. Writer Allan Scott saw the play in London and recommended the story to producer Stanley Kramer, who had a contract with Columbia Pictures. Scott purchased the rights for $15,000 and persuaded Rex Harrison and Lilli Palmer to star in the film.

The Four Poster features animated sequences created by United Productions of America (UPA) and directed by John Hubley, his final project before leaving UPA and founding his independent studio, Storyboard, Inc.

== Reception ==
In a contemporary review for The New York Times, critic Bosley Crowther called the film "piously sentimental" and described it as "a series of glimpses of a marriage, from wedding night to final death, that is gay and amusing in some phases, solemn and poignant in other ones, and is eventually brought to a fade-out in a forced glow of melancholy sweetness and smiling gloom."
