= Faith Hubley =

American animator (1924–2001)

- Born: Faith Chestman; September 16, 1924; New York City, U.S.
- Died: December 7, 2001 (aged 77); New Haven, Connecticut, U.S.
- Occupations: Animator; storyboard artist; teacher
- Years active: 1945–2001
- Spouse: John Hubley (m. 1955; died 1977)
- Children: 4, including: Georgia Hubley; Emily Hubley

Faith Hubley (née Chestman; September 16, 1924 – December 7, 2001) was an American animator, known for her experimental work both in collaboration with her husband John Hubley, and on her own following her husband's death.

== Early life ==
Faith Chestman was born to Sally and Irving Chestman, Russian-Jewish immigrants, she grew up with three siblings on Manhattan's West Side during the 1920s and 1930s. She spoke little about her childhood and left home at age 15 to work in the theater. At 18, she moved to Hollywood, starting as a messenger at Columbia Pictures. She subsequently worked as a sound-effects and music editor, and then as a script clerk for Republic Pictures. She was later a script supervisor for 12 Angry Men and an editor for Go, Man, Go, with the Harlem Globetrotters.[citation needed] During most of this early period, she went by the name Faith Elliott, using the surname of her first husband, Melvin Elliott, a radio announcer on WQXR.

== Career ==
The Hubleys jointly founded Storyboard Studios as an independent animation studio, vowing to make one independent film a year. They collaborated on more than 20 short films, up until John's death during open-heart surgery in 1977. At that time they were working on the Doonesbury television cartoon, A Doonesbury Special. Faith Hubley, with Garry Trudeau and Bill Littlejohn, completed the special despite the doubts of NBC executives. The Hubleys won Oscars for their shorts: Moonbird (1959), The Hole (1962) and A Herb Alpert and the Tijuana Brass Double Feature (1966); they also received Oscar nominations for Windy Day, Of Men and Demons, Voyage to Next and A Doonesbury Special. Her many solo projects established her as a significant film creator in her own right. She began her first solo project, W.O.W. (Women of the World), after being diagnosed with breast cancer in 1975.

Between 1976 and 2001, she completed 24 further solo animated films. Her films often feature abstract imagery and non-linear stories; many draw on themes of mythology and indigenous art. She was also a painter, with her works being exhibited in galleries in Europe and the United States. Unlike conventional hand-drawn animation where a camera takes pictures of paintings on celluloid that are lit from above, she used a technique where drawings on paper were illuminated from below, giving the animation a special look.

Faith Hubley taught at the Yale School of Art in the 1990s.

== Preservation, legacy, and accolades ==
The Academy Film Archive preserved several of Faith Hubley's films, including A Smattering of Spots, A Doonesbury Special, and The Hole.

Faith Hubley received honors from the Cannes, Venice, London, and San Francisco film festivals. She won fourteen CINE Golden Eagle awards, and received honorary doctorates from the University of Chicago, Columbia College, and Hofstra University. Her 1981 animated film "Enter Life" can be seen at the Smithsonian Institution's National Museum of Natural History, as part of the Early Life exhibit. In 1995, the National Gallery of Art presented a retrospective program of her works.

To coincide with the unveiling of a historical marker for her husband, John Hubley, in his hometown of Marinette, Wisconsin, Marinette's mayor Steve Genisot proclaimed May 20, 2023 "John and Faith Hubley Day" in Wisconsin. Though not a native of Wisconsin, Faith Hubley was recognized for being "unarguably [one] of the most important figures in the history of independent animation, and indeed independent film".

== Personal life and death ==
Hubley married John Hubley in 1955. The couple raised four children: Mark Hubley (from Faith's first marriage), film editor Raymond (Ray) Hubley, animator Emily Hubley, and musician/artist Georgia Hubley. The voices of the couple's young children were featured in a number of their films.

Faith Hubley died on December 7, 2001, age 77, in New Haven, Connecticut, after having battled various forms of cancer since the 1970s.

== Filmography ==
=== With John Hubley ===
- Adventures of an * (1956)
- Harlem Wednesday (1957)
- Tender Game (1958)
- Moonbird (1959)
- Children of the Sun (1960)
- Of Stars and Men (1961)
- The Hole (1962)
- The Hat (1963)
- A Herb Alpert and the Tijuana Brass Double Feature (1965)
- Urbanissimo (1966)
- The Cruise (1966)
- Windy Day (1967)
- Of Men and Demons (1968)
- Zuckerkandl (1969)
- Sesame Street ("Imagination E", 1969)
- Sesame Street ("O Song", 1969)
- Sesame Street ("Polar Bear & Exit", 1970)
- Sesame Street ("Small V", 1970)
- Eggs (1970)
- Sesame Street ("F for Football", 1971)
- Sesame Street ("Baby Fantasy", 1971)
- Sesame Street ("Birds 1-20", 1971)
- Sesame Street ("Penguin Rhythms", 1971)
- Sesame Street ("Hungry M", 1971)
- Dig (1972) (TV film)
- Sesame Street ("Letter S", 1972)
- Cockaboody (1973)(TV film)
- Voyage to Next (1974)
- People, People, People (1975)
- Everybody Rides the Carousel (1976)(TV film)
- A Doonesbury Special (1977)

=== Solo ===
- W.O.W. (Women of the World) (1975)
- Second Chance: Sea (1976)
- Whither Weather (1977)
- Sesame Street ("Catch the Kitty", 1977)
- Step by Step (1978)
- Sky Dance (1980)
- The Big Bang and Other Creation Myths (1981)
- Sesame Street ("Vitamin V", 1981)
- Enter Life (1981)
- Starlore (1983)
- Hello (1984)
- Sesame Street ("Bedtime Noises", 1985)
- The Cosmic Eye (1985)
- Sesame Street ("Telephone Cat", 1986)
- Time of the Angels (1987)
- Yes We Can (1989)
- Sesame Street ("S-Snake", 1989)
- Who Am I? (1989)
- Amazonia (1990)
- Upside Down (1991)
- Tall Time Tales (1992)
- Cloudland (1993)
- Seers and Clowns (1994)
- Rainbows of Hawai'i (1995)
- My Universe Inside Out (1996)
- The Girl With Her Head Coming Off (with Emily Hubley) (1996)
- Beyond the Shadow Place (1997)
- Africa (1998)
- Witch Madness (1999)
- Our Spirited Earth (2000)
- Northern Ice, Golden Sun (2001)
