= Enter Life =

- Directed by: Faith Hubley
- Music by: Elizabeth Swados
- Release date: 1982

Enter Life is an 8-minute animated film from 1982 about the earliest origin of life (or abiogensis) on Earth. Directed by Faith Hubley of Hubley Studios, the film traces a possible course of development (according to contemporary theory) of organic compounds, amino acids and early cellular organisms.

Featuring anthropomorphic amino acids and cells as well as a light-hearted touch, with music by Elizabeth Swados, the film has shown considerable durability, still being shown on continuous loop at the National Museum of Natural History of the Smithsonian Institution, which sponsored the original production.
