= John Hubley =

American film director, producer, and screenwriter (1914–1977)

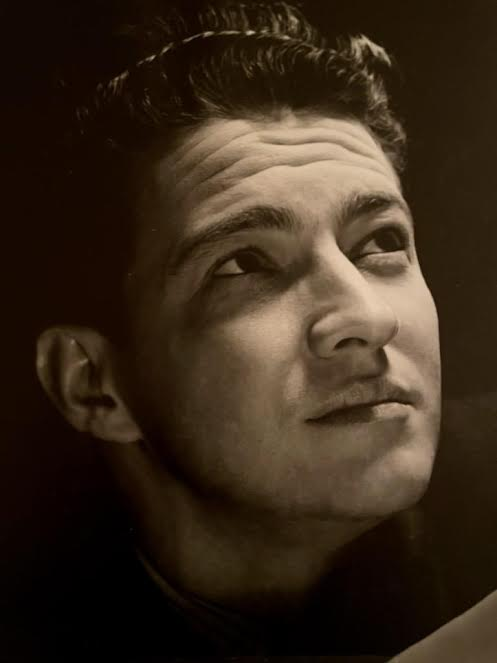
- Hubley in 1941
- Born: John Kirkham Hubley; May 21, 1914; Marinette, Wisconsin, US
- Died: February 21, 1977 (aged 62); New Haven, Connecticut, US
- Education: ArtCenter College of Design
- Occupation: Animated film director
- Years active: 1936–1977
- Employer(s): Walt Disney Productions (1936–1941); Screen Gems (1941–1943); UPA (1944–1953); Storyboard, Inc./Hubley Studios (1953–1977)
- Spouses: Claudia Sewell (m. 1941; div. 1954) Faith Hubley (m. 1955)
- Children: 6, including Emily Hubley and Georgia Hubley
- Relatives: Kathleen Kirkham (Aunt)
- Military career
- Allegiance: United States
- Branch: United States Army; Army Air Forces; First Motion Picture Unit
- Service years: 1942–1946
- Rank: Private
- Unit: 18th AAF Base Unit
- Conflicts: World War II

John Kirkham Hubley (May 21, 1914 – February 21, 1977) was an American animated film director, art director, producer, and writer, known for his work with the United Productions of America (UPA) and his own independent studio, Storyboard, Inc. (later renamed Hubley Studio). A pioneer and innovator in the American animation industry, Hubley pushed for more visually and emotionally complex films than the productions at that time of Walt Disney Productions and Warner Bros. Cartoons. He and his second wife, Faith Hubley (née Chestman), worked side by side from 1953 onward, earning seven Academy Award nominations, of which they won three.

Hubley was born in Marinette, Wisconsin, in 1914 and developed an interest in art from a young age, as both his mother and maternal grandfather were professional painters. After high school, he attended the ArtCenter College of Design, then in Los Angeles, to study painting. At age 22, after three years of classes, he landed a job at Walt Disney Productions. Although the studio recognized his talents and made him an animation director on Fantasia, Hubley felt restricted by the conservative animation style. Hubley left Disney in 1941 during the Disney animator's strike and joined the First Motion Pictures Unit, later following many of his fellow unit artists to the newly formed Industrial Poster Service (later renamed the United Productions of America). Hubley served many roles at UPA and directed several Academy Award-nominated animated shorts. Most famously, he directed The Ragtime Bear (1949), the debut of Mr. Magoo, a character he co-created.

In 1952, Hubley was forced to leave UPA after refusing to denounce communism, leading to his eventual investigation by the House Un-American Activities Committee. He soon opened his own independent studio to capitalize on commercial work for the new market of television advertising, directing the successful "I Want My Maypo!" spot. In 1954, he was commissioned by the Solomon R. Guggenheim Museum to make an animated short film, the first short ever funded by an art museum.

Hubley, alongside his wife Faith, is often considered the most important figure in American independent animation and one of the most important in the history of animation. The couple's Moonbird (1959) became the first independent film to win the Academy Award for Best Animated Short. They collaborated with jazz musicians including Dizzy Gillespie, Benny Carter, and Quincy Jones and often used unscripted, improvised dialogue, creating an entirely new way of expressing emotion and feeling through the medium of animation. Their work is considered important in the evolution of post-war modernism in film. The Academy of Motion Pictures Arts and Sciences claim the Hubleys' films "bucked the establishment and defined an era of independent animation production".

== Early life and education ==
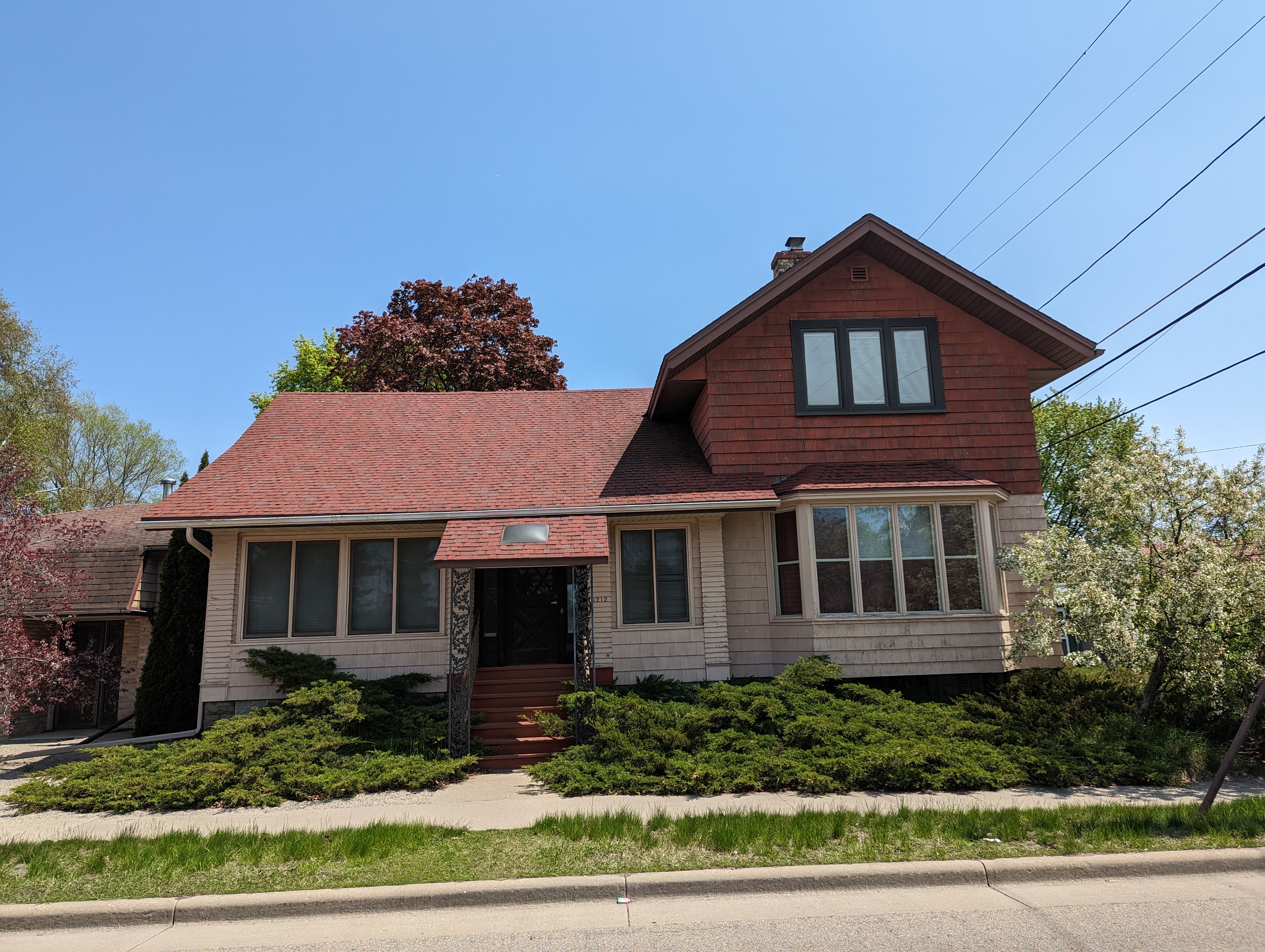
Hubley's birthplace in Marinette, Wisconsin.

Hubley was born on May 21, 1914, at 1212 11th Street (now Shore Drive) in Marinette, Wisconsin. His father, John Raymond Hubley, was a secretary at the John B Goodman Company, a logging company, in Marinette, and his mother, Verena Kirkham Hubley, was a homemaker. Verena's maternal grandfather, Jacob Leisen, was one of the founders of the Leisen & Henes Brewing Company in Menominee, Michigan. The Leisen-Kirkham family were economically stable, allowing Verena's parents to send her to the Art Institute of Chicago, where she studied painting from 1907 to 1909. Verena's father, Richard Archibald Kirkham, was also a painter and one of the earliest photographers in Menominee.

Hubley was encouraged at a young age to become an artist by his mother and maternal grandfather. In a 1974 interview, he recalled, "I used to watch my grandfather when I was a little kid...It was always ordained that I would go to art school as soon as I got out of high school.".

In 1921, his father partnered with a cousin, Loren O. Robeck, to open Robeck & Hubley, a Ford dealership at 1919 Hall Avenue in Marinette. The business was only modestly successful and closed in 1928, the same year the Hubleys left Marinette and moved to Iron Mountain, Michigan. Hubley attended Iron Mountain High School from 1929 to 1932. While a student, Hubley would partake in a wide array of extracurricular activities, including the debate, drama, a capella, basketball, Hi-Y (a male-only group associated with the YMCA), and mathematics clubs. Hubley also wrote for the school's newspaper, The Mountaineer, and from 1930 to 1932 provided the illustrations for the school's yearbook, The Argonaut. While in high school, Hubley worked as a bank cashier in Iron Mountain.

In the fall of 1933, Hubley enrolled at the ArtCenter College of Design in Los Angeles to study painting. Unable to support himself, he lived with his aunt, Kathleen Kirkham Woodruff, who had moved to Los Angeles for her film career. Her husband, Harry Woodruff, inspired the character Mr. Magoo. During his time in college, the newly formed Walt Disney Animation Studio was scouting local art schools for talent. Hubley's painting talents caught the studio's eye, and he was hired as a background and layout artist.

== Career ==
=== Working at Disney and the 1941 Animator's Strike: 1936–1941 ===
Hubley started working at Walt Disney Productions on January 1, 1936. He started as an apprentice on Snow White and the Seven Dwarfs (1937) producing background tracings and painting backgrounds and layouts for animators. He was quickly promoted to an art director for Pinocchio (1940).

On February 25, 1939, the architect Frank Lloyd Wright visited the studio with a copy of The Tale of the Czar Durandai (1934), a Russian animated film directed by Ivan Ivanov-Vano. Wright showed the film to Disney's staff, including Hubley, who was greatly inspired by the film's stylized visuals and animation.

Hubley was chosen as one of three directors (alongside Dick Kelsey and McLaren Stewart) to handle the "Rite of Spring" passage of Fantasia (1940). Specifically, Hubley directed the section covering the molten stage of Earth's creation to the cooling off into greenery. Hubley was upset by the film's inaccuracy, stating that "it was not scientifically accurate in terms of the demise of the reptiles. It was more likely they were frozen by the ice age. But Disney didn't want an ice age; he wanted a desert sequence". Hubley also painted several backgrounds for the "Sorcerer's Apprentice" segment. This same year, Hubley moved out of the Woodruffs' house to his own house at 3827 Ronda Vista Place in Los Angeles. Hubley lived here with fellow Disney Studios artist and actor John McLeish.

In the spring of 1941, employees at Disney Studios were unhappy with salary inequalities and the studio discouraging unionization. Hubley and his wife Claudia both participated in the 1941 Disney animators' strike, with John taking dozens of photographs to document the event. Hubley was one of the better-paid employees of the studio, making $67.50 a week (equivalent to $1,367.04 in 2023), but decided to strike in support of unionization. The strike, organized by Hubley's friend Art Babbitt, strengthened Hubley's relationship with strikers like Bill Littlejohn, Herb Klynn, Stephen Bosustow, and Jules Engel, all of whom later worked with Hubley at UPA or Hubley Studios. On August 10, 1941, John and Claudia were two of the 256 employees fired by the studio when the strike ended.

=== Enlistment and beginning of UPA: 1942–1948 ===
After being fired from Disney Studios, Hubley briefly worked at Columbia's Screen Gems under Frank Tashlin, and later Dave Fleischer. He initially worked as a writer and layout artist, but by the time Tashlin left the studio, Hubley was promoted to director alongside animator Paul Sommer, with the short Old Blackout Joe (1942) being his first time directing. Hubley disliked his work at Screen Gems and referred to Fleischer as "one of the world's intellectual lightweights," however, Fleischer's detachment from the employees allowed Hubley to gain creative freedom he had not found at the Disney Studio. Hubley co-directed seven cartoons for Screen Gems, with many noting how most of them relied much more on human characters and stylistic designs and backgrounds, elements that would remain relevant to Hubley's later work. Hubley and Sommer were also noted for directing The Rocky Road to Ruin (1943), a cartoon eerily similar to Chuck Jones' The Dover Boys at Pimento University (1942) which featured similar character designs and settings.

Concept art by Hubley for Hell-Bent for Election (1944).

On November 23, 1942, Hubley enlisted in the United States Armed Forces to work in the First Motion Picture Unit, an independent film production unit in the Air Force. Here, Hubley directed animated training films related to flight safety and firearm equipment. Hubley's time in the Air Force was leisurely, and he "got to go home every night" and "spent half [his] time drawing [gags] and passing them around". The Air Force had few expectations for how the films should aesthetically look or feel, allowing Hubley and his team near-complete creative control. Hubley, who had grown increasingly more interested in the works of modern artists like Paul Klee, pushed his films to have flat, abstract visuals. Since the films were often uncredited, it is unknown how many films Hubley directed for the First Motion Picture Unit, but Flight Safety: Landing Accidents (1946) was likely his last. Hubley is credited with the animations on Tuesday in November (1945), produced by the US Office of War Information.

In 1943, Hubley was contacted by the United Automobile Workers (UAW), who were looking to hire Hubley to produce a short film endorsing Franklin D. Roosevelt in the 1944 Presidential Election. Hubley took the project to the newly formed Industrial Film and Poster Service, which was soon renamed to United Productions of America (UPA). The film, Hell-Bent for Election (1944), was storyboarded by Hubley and directed by Chuck Jones. At UPA, Hubley found the creative freedom he had yearned for his entire career. The UAW was pleased with Hell-Bent for Election and hired UPA for Brotherhood of Man (1945), a film on race relations. Hubley co-wrote the film and led the production design. With both UAW films, Hubley pushed for a modernist aesthetic of sleek lines, flat shapes, and bold colors that were completely unique to UPA's films.

By 1947, Hubley had been promoted to vice president and creative head of UPA. That same year, UPA founder Stephen Bosustow struck a distribution deal with Columbia: UPA would produce several "trial" films for the studio using Columbia's cartoon stars The Fox and The Crow. If the films were a success, Columbia would enter a formal distribution partnership with UPA. Hubley was tasked with directing the first "trial" films, Robin Hoodlum (1948) and The Magic Fluke (1949).

=== UPA and Mr. Magoo: 1949–1952 ===
Concept art by Hubley (c.1950) for Rooty Toot Toot (1951). The film showed Hubley's further exploration of stylized animation and character designs in his work.

Hubley and the UPA team felt restricted with The Fox and The Crow shorts, and approached Columbia with an idea for an original short. Hubley, inspired by his uncle Harry Woodruff, pitched an idea for a short-tempered, aggressive old curmudgeon. "The character was based upon an uncle of mine, Harry Woodruff"he later said. Hubley and writer Millard Kaufman would name the character Mr. Magoo after Point Mugu in Malibu, California.While Hubley is often credited as the sole creator of Mr. Magoo, the character was a combined effort with Kaufman, who based Magoo partially on his own uncle.

Hubley and UPA founder Zachary Schwartz made their intentions with UPA clear in a 1946 issue of Film Quarterly. Hubley and Schwartz believed it had become "necessary for the craftsman-animators of the motion picture industry to analyze and reevaluate their medium". Hubley and Schwartz were influenced by their shared experience in the First Motion Picture Unit making training films, specifically by how animation was being used as an educational tool, as the two believed "animation usage in the educational film [was] singularly undeveloped" before the war. Now, Hubley and Schwartz understood the "significance of the animated film as means of communication" and aimed to create films that could "express the essence of an idea" with "line, shape, color, and symbols".

Hubley served as the supervising director of Gerald McBoing-Boing (1950), written by Theodor Geisel and directed by Robert Cannon. The film won UPA their first Academy Award for Best Short Subject Cartoon, which "stung" and "really shocked" Hubley, claimed layout artist Bill Hurtz. Hubley, now determined to win his own Academy Award for the studio, directed Rooty Toot Toot (1952), UPA's most expensive and ambitious film at the time. Hubley wrote the film alongside Bill Scott and hired Phil Moore to compose the score. At the recommendation of Art Babbitt, Hubley hired dancer Olga Lunick to choreograph the film's dance elements, and much of the film's animation was done by Betty Boop creator Grim Natwick. The film's dark themes of murder, sex, violence, jealousy, and infidelity were a "groundbreaking moment for animation". While the film was nominated for the Academy Award, it lost to The Two Mouseketeers. The same year, Hubley also directed the animated segments of Irving Reis's The Four Poster (1952).

In September 1951, UPA layout artist Bernyce Fleury testified before the House Un-American Activities Committee that several UPA artists, including Hubley, were promoting communism through their films. In response, the following April Columbia sent UPA a list of eight suspected communist employees which included Hubley. Columbia, threatening to end their distribution deal with UPA, wanted the named employees to either confess or leave UPA. Hubley refused to denounce communism and was subsequently fired from UPA on May 31, 1952. Reflecting upon his time at UPA, Hubley would say "it got too large. Before we knew where we were, we were getting more and more concerned with administration and less with creation."

=== Independent success with Storyboard, Inc. 1952–1969 ===
Following his firing from UPA, Hubley was effectively blacklisted from the animation industry. He found work illustrating album covers for Westminster and Clef Records for artists such as Al Hibbler, Aaron Copland, Slim Gaillard, and Chico O'Farrill. These covers showed Hubley's art progressing further into abstract expressionism and modernism, taking heavy influence from Pablo Picasso.

Still "undercover" in Hollywood, Hubley founded Storyboard, Inc. (sometimes referred to as Storyboard Studios or simply Storyboard) in 1953. Since television work was both uncredited and in high demand, Hubley quickly found work directing animated commercials for companies such as Heinz, Bank of America, and E-Z Pop. Since many of his clients were looking for a fast turnaround, Hubley's highly stylized approach to limited animation and bold graphics became both practical and popular. For these early commercials, Hubley would again collaborate with animators such as Bill Littlejohn, Emery Hawkins, and Rob Scribner. Also in 1953, Hubley and producer Michael Shore began developing an animated adaptation of the musical Finian's Rainbow. Shore wanted Hubley to direct, and Hubley was motivated to "develop the visual art even further than the UPA films". Shore had difficulty interesting studios with the project due to the musical's strong racial themes, but eventually secured funding and a distribution deal with the Distributors Corporation of America (DCA). Frank Sinatra and Ella Fitzgerald were signed on for the film, marking their only collaboration. By the end of 1954, all of the dialogue and music had been recorded for the film and Hubley had assembled a large team of past collaborators, such as Littlejohn, Babbitt, and Les Goldman. Faith Elliott (née Chestman), later Hubley's second wife, served as a script supervisor on the film. While Hubley was very excited for the project, his "easygoing manner" made him "hard to work with because he wasn't very disciplined". The musical's writers, Burton Lane and Yip Harburg (a fellow victim of the blacklist), kept a close watch on Hubley, and tensions soon arose over the musical direction of the film and Hubley's visuals. Issues also arose between DCA and members of the film's crew who were members of the Screen Cartoonists Guild (SCG) and not the International Alliance of Theatrical Stage Employees (IATSE). DCA was concerned that since many members of the crew were not IATSE, the film would not be played in theaters. Soon thereafter, DCA president Fred J. Schwartz received a call from IATSE representative Roy Brewer, who ousted Hubley for his refusal to cooperate with the HUAC. Hubley, who still refused to testify before the HUAC, caused DCA's parent company to stop funding the film. While Schwartz did attempt to save the film by approaching RKO, it was no use. The film was canceled in 1955, with the contents of the entire studio impounded.

A production drawing for The Adventures of an * (1957); the project was the first film funded by an art museum.

In 1955, after the collapse of Finian's Rainbow, Hubley moved Storyboard, Inc. with him to New York City, where he soon married his second wife, Faith Hubley (née Chestman). Faith, herself an editor and script supervisor on films such as 12 Angry Men (1957), collaborated closely with her husband on all of their subsequent films. Towards the end of 1954, Hubley and James J. Sweeney, the director of the Solomon R. Guggenheim Museum, began discussing the museum commissioning a film from Hubley. Hubley and Sweeney were determined to create a film that also served as a piece of modern art and communicated the importance of "play" and "the sensuous pleasures of [approaching pictures through] the eye rather than [the] intellectual pleasure [of] the ear". The resulting film, The Adventures of * (1957) (Note: Sometimes referred to as The Adventures of an * or spelled out The Adventures of Asterisk.) was the first short film Hubley directed after leaving UPA, as well as the first animated film ever commissioned by an art museum. The film's visuals were heavily influenced by the Guggenheim Museum's collection of modern art, as well as Hubley's desire to "transform [animation] from hard-lined cel animation to textured, subtle, new styles more connected to the history of art than to the Disney or UPA look". Benny Carter composed the film's score, including vibraphone by Lionel Hampton. The film won several awards, including a diploma speciale from the 1957 Venice Film Festival and the Grand Prize at the 1958 Montevideo Film Festival. In 1957, Hubley was also hired by the advertising firm Fletcher, Richards, Calkins & Holden to direct the hugely successful "I Want My Maypo!" commercial. For the first time in his career, Hubley used the voice of one of his children, his stepson Mark, for the commercial. The commercial led to a boom of sales for Maypo, and the character of "Marky Maypo" (named after his stepson) became the cereal's mascot. The commercial is also credited for beginning the trend of using animation to sell products to children, as it "exploit[ed] children's less than fully developed ability to distinguish between entertainment and selling". Around this time, Hubley met musician Dizzy Gillespie through mutual friend Paul Robeson, and the Hubleys soon made their first film with Gillespie, A Date with Dizzy (1956). The film contained many of the advertisements Hubley had already made at Storyboard, Inc., as well as an original segment by a then-unknown R.O. Blechman.

Moonbird (1959), directed by Hubley and his wife, was the first independent film to win the Academy Award for Best Animated Short Film.

Following the success of the Maypo spot, John and Faith turned their attention to producing more short films. Their next film, Harlem Wednesday (1957), marked the first time John and Faith were credited alongside one another on-screen (though Faith is credited as Faith Elliott). The film, an experimental montage of paintings by Gregorio Prestopino with a score by Carter, further explored the Hubleys' desires to push animation towards modern art. Their next film, Tender Game (1958), included an unused track by Fitzgerald from Finian's Rainbow. Hubley experimented with multiple exposure effects on the film to give it a distinct look and dimensionality. Mark Hubley would later remark "the film has always struck me...as a love letter between [John and Faith], the figures...look like mom and dad". The film won the grand prize at both the Venice Film Festival and the Montevideo Film Festival. Hubley was inspired by his earlier work on the Mr. Magoo films with Jim Backus to experiment with films centered around improvised dialogue, as he often encouraged Backus to riff in the studio. In 1958, Hubley recorded his sons Mark (aged 6) and Ray (aged 3) his sons playing a game where they search for a "Moonbird", referring to a pet bird the family had lost recently by leaving a window open. Faith edited the conversations together into a narrative, and John enlisted Ed Smith and former UPA director Robert Cannon for animation. The resulting film, Moonbird (1959), marked one of the earliest examples of using real children voices in an animated film. Moonbird won the Academy Award for Best Animated Short in 1960, becoming the first independent film to win in the category. The success of Moonbird caught the attention of Susan Burnett, the film officer of the United Nations Children's Fund (UNICEF), who commissioned the Hubleys to make a film for UNICEF. For the first time, Hubley used the voices of all of he and Faith's children, though most of their vocals are gurgles and mumbles made by his infant daughters Emily and Georgia. The film, Children of the Sun (1960), addressed "how hunger affects the world's children".

Hubley wanted to make a film about Albert Einstein's Theory of Relativity, and was inspired after reading Harlow Shapley's Of Stars and Men (1959) in 1959. Intrigued by Shapley's attempts to understand mankind's place in the universe, Hubley wrote to Shapley with the idea to adapt the book's themes into an animated film. Instead of simply writing a script and getting Shapley's approval, Hubley and Shapley chose to collaborate closely on nearly every aspect of the film, with Hubley sending Shapley detailed outlines for the film's structure and frequently traveling to Shapley's home in Peterborough, New Hampshire, to meet with him. Hubley and Shapley became close friends during this period, resulting in Of Stars and Men (1962), the Hubleys' first feature-length film. The film follows a very loose narrative style, relying predominantly on Shapley's narration. Hubley's children would again appear in the film, with their improvised conversations again being presented much in the same way as in Moonbird. Due to the nature of the film's presentation, the Hubleys, audiences, and distributors alike were unsure if the film could be categorized as a documentary. At the 1961 San Francisco International Film Festival, the film won Best Documentary, and at the Venice Film Festival - where the Hubleys' films had been previously screened as part of the animation category - the film was placed in the feature category alongside live-action films. Author Sybil DelGaudio cites the film as one of the earliest examples of an animated documentary. While the film was screened in festivals as early as 1962, the Hubleys would continue to revise the film and appeal to both Columbia and Show Corp. for distribution; it would be released to the general public in 1964 by Films, Inc.

While shopping around Of Stars and Men, the Hubleys collaborated again with Gillespie for The Hole (1962). Gillespie and actor George Matthews improvised a conversation between two construction workers discussing life and nuclear war. The film mirrored American anxieties over the Cold War, as it was in production during the Cuban Missile Crisis. The film won the Hubleys their second Academy Award for Best Animated Short, with John and Faith both being recognized by the academy for the first time. The Hole led to the World Law Foundation commissioning the Hubleys to make The Hat (1964), a spiritual successor of sorts to The Hole centered around an improvised conversation between Gillespie and Dudley Moore as soldiers debating the morality of war. The Hat came from the World Law Foundation's initiative to "reach...broader audiences" through "arts and media". Both The Hole and The Hat use a more grounded visual style than the abstract expressionism of The Adventures of * and Of Stars and Men and address more serious themes of violence, nuclear war, nuclear anxieties, and death. The Hat was the only film by the Hubleys distributed by McGraw-Hill, and was also released as a book with illustrations taken from the film. Carter would collaborate with the Hubleys again on Urbanissimo (1966), a film humorously examining the impact of urban sprawl on the environment made for Expo 67 in Montreal, Quebec. A Herb Alpert and the Tijuana Brass Double Feature (1966), (Note: Sometimes referred to with an ampersand as A Herb Alpert & The Tijuana Brass Double Feature. The Academy Film Archive uses this spelling.) a film interpreting the music of jazz musician Herb Alpert, was released the same year. John and Faith won their third Academy Award for the short, and the film is today considered to be an early prototypical example of a music video. The film was distributed by Paramount, marking the first collaboration between Hubley and a major Hollywood studio following his 1952 blacklisting.

Hubley began teaching filmmaking at Harvard in 1962, becoming the first teacher of animation at Harvard's Visual Arts Center. Hubley wrote an adaptation of Edwin Abbot's 1884 novella Flatland, and collaborated with his students as well as Dudley Moore and several members of Beyond the Fringe. The resulting film, Flatland (1965), was directed by Eric Martin. As early as 1964, filmmaker Joseph Koenig pitched a film explaining the importance of voting to the National Film Board of Canada (NFB). Hubley was chosen to direct the film for the NFB, which eventually became The Cruise (1967). The film was designed to be an educational tool for school use, though Hubley had very little involvement with creating the curriculum surrounding the film. The film would be screened in high schools and colleges across the United States and Canada throughout the 1960s and 1970s. Hubley's involvement with education would continue in the 1970s, when he and Faith became professors of film at Yale University teaching animation and "The Visualization of Abstract Themes".

The Hubleys continued to make short films together for the rest of the 1960s. Their next film, Windy Day (1967) featured an improvised conversation between their daughters Georgia and Emily "explor[ing] the child's projection of fantasy to enact romance, marriage, and growing up". The film was nominated for the 1968 Academy Award for Best Animated Short, but lost to Disney's Winnie the Pooh and the Blustery Day. The Center for the Study of Democratic Institutions commissioned Hubley for Zuckerkandl! (1968), a short film interpreting a comical routine by Robert M. Hutchins. The short was also released as a book with illustrations by Hubley. Hubley was commissioned again for Storyboard, Inc.'s next film, Of Men and Demons (1969), by IBM for Expo '70 in Osaka, Japan. The film earned John and Faith their fifth Academy Award nomination for Best Animated Short.

=== Hubley Studios, Inc. and late career: 1970–1977 ===
1970 saw the release of Hubley's fifteenth independent directorial credit with Eggs (1970). For the first time, John and Faith collaborated with musician Quincy Jones, who composed and performed the film's score. The film addressed themes of fertility and death and continues Hubley's run of collaborating with musicians as voice actors, as singers Anita Ellis and Grady Tate lent their voices for the film, as did actor David Burns. The film was entirely animated by Tissa David, a recent hire of the Hubleys best known as the second woman to ever direct a feature-length animated film, Bonjour Paris! (1953). Around this time, Storyboard, Inc. was renamed Hubley Studios, Inc. (sometimes referred to as The Hubley Studio or Hubley Studios), indicating Hubley's growing confidence towards using his name as the effects of the blacklist faded away.

Despite the critical acclaim the studio's films received, Hubley was still struggling financially. "Film shorts seem inevitably to be financial failures, for the only people who come out ahead on them are the distributors. Even Moonbird, for instance, grossed at least as much as its production costs (about $25,000), but only a third of the gross wound up at Storyboard, Inc.", revealed a 1964 profile by The Harvard Crimson. By the beginning of the 1970s, John and Faith understood they needed to take on more commercial work in order to fund their shorts, and began contributing animated segments for New York-based children's variety programs such as The Electric Company and Sesame Street. Notably, Hubley directed the "Letter E" segment for the latter's first episode on November 10, 1969. Hubley directed over thirty animated segments for the show between 1969 and 1977. His most notable contributions would be on The Electric Company, where Hubley directed "The Adventures of Letterman" segments from 1972 to 1977 featuring Joan Rivers, Gene Wilder, and Zero Mostel. On both Sesame Street and The Electric Company Hubley would again collaborate with artists like Quincy Jones and Dizzy Gillespie for voice acting and music. To help handle the new workload at the studio, Hubley hired several new artists, including Tissa David and Michael Sporn.

While working on animated segments for Sesame Street and The Electric Company, Hubley became more recognized for his television work (as he hadn't made a television commercial since the late 1950s). CBS approached the Hubleys to produce an educational program on geology for the station. Hubley enlisted the help of geoscientist Bruce Heezen to research the film. Originally titled "What's Under My Foot?", Dig (1972) premiered on CBS on April 8, 1972. The film's music was composed by Jones and featured Jack Warden and Hubley's son, Ray. The following year, the film was adapted into a book co-written by John and Faith. Much in the same way The Hole and The Hat were companion pieces, Hubley's next film, Cockaboody (1973) was a companion piece to Windy Day (1967). Hubley again recorded a conversation between his daughters Georgia and Emily and brought it to life through animation. Unlike Windy Day, John and Faith collaborated with students in their animation class at Yale University to create the film. Cockaboody was created in conjunction with the Hubleys' students at Yale, as well as the Yale Child Study Center. The process of making Cockaboody at Yale was filmed by Howard Sayre Weaver for the documentary In Quest of Cockaboody (1973). Cockaboody marked the first time The Hubley Studio name was used in one of Hubley's films, and the second film at the studio animated solely by David.

John and Faith earned another Academy Award nomination for their next shot, Voyage to the Next (1974), another collaboration with Gillespie, as well as actresses Maureen Stapleton and Dee Dee Bridgewater commissioned by The Institute for World Order. Continuing the themes of previous films like Eggs and The Hat, Voyage to the Next tackles themes of environmentalism, nationalism, and war. The same year, the Zagreb Film Festival held a career-long retrospective on John and Faith's films, with John serving as president of the year's jury. In an ironic turn of events, Hubley's next film, People People People (1975), was commissioned by the United States Bicentennial Commission. Hubley, now being commissioned by the same government that had practically forced him out of UPA in 1952, was finally free from the effects of the blacklist. This same year, both John and Faith were awarded the Winsor McCay Award from ASIFA, the highest honor an artist in the animation industry can receive.

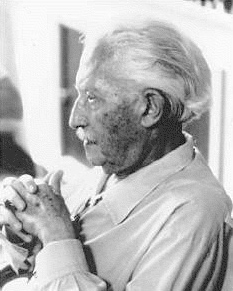
Psychologist Erik Erickson (pictured) and his Theory of the Eight Stages of Life inspired Hubley's first feature-length film, Everybody Rides the Carousel (1976). Coincidentally, Erikson's daughter was a student of Hubley's at Yale.

Now one of the most respected artists in an industry that had blacklisted him only two decades prior, Hubley began his most ambitious project to date. As early as 1973, John and Faith became interested in adapting Erik Erikson's Theory of the Eight Stages of Life in a feature-length animated film. As they did with Cockaboody, the Hubleys planned to make the film in conjunction with Yale's Film Laboratory Center. Initially, Erikson was dismissive of the idea, but by 1975 he agreed, with CBS interested in airing the film. Initially, CBS and Hubley agreed the film would be three half-hour episodes, but CBS changed it to be one ninety-minute film during the final three months of production. John and Faith created the film's storyboards alongside their Yale class, supervised by professor Ken Kennison. Hubley picked many unknown actors with few or no prior credits for the film, including Lawrence Pressman, his then-girlfriend Lanna Saunders, and Yale student Meryl Streep in her first acting role. The Hubley children also appear in the film for different stages of life. Everybody Rides the Carousel (1976) was broadcast on September 10, 1976. Much like the Hubleys' previous films, the film is built from improvised conversations between the actors relating to Erikson's stages of life. The larger production led to Hubley Studios hiring a handful of new employees, including Erikson's daughter, Sue Erikson, coincidentally a student of the Hubleys at Yale. The film was a success, and won the Blue Ribbon Award at that year's American Film Festival.

Around the time Hubley began production on Everybody Rides the Carousel, producer Martin Rosen hired Hubley to direct an animated adaptation of Richard Adams' Watership Down (1972). Hubley flew to London to meet Rosen at the new studio Rosen opened for the film and the two took trips to the English countryside for inspiration, but Hubley's interest in the project quickly faded. Rosen and Hubley frequently disagreed on the film's narrative, with Rosen pushing for grittiness and Hubley pushing for a lighter tone and more abstract visual style. Hubley had signed an exclusivity contract to work on the film, but Rosen soon found out he was secretly developing a new film, leading to Rosen firing Hubley from the film and becoming the director himself. Hubley's work can be seen in the opening "fable" scene, animated by Bill Littlejohn, Phil Duncan, Ruth Kissane, and Barrie Nelson. Hubley is often credited as the co-director of the film, but his name does not appear in the credits. In November 1976, cartoonist Garry Trudeau approached Hubley with the idea of an animated special featuring Trudeau's characters from Doonesbury. Hubley and Trudeau had already known one another, as Trudeau was one of Hubley's students in the early seventies, and Trudeau and the Hubleys greatly enjoyed working with one another. In 1976, Doonesbury was one of the most popular newspaper comics in America, having won a Pulitzer Prize the year prior and frequently making headlines for being dropped by papers across the country over Trudeau's decision to tackle topical and controversial real-world events. Unlike their previous films, John and Faith shared directing and producing credits with Trudeau and followed a tight script for the film. Toward the middle of production in February 1977 Hubley died, leaving Faith and Trudeau to finish the film themselves. A Doonesbury Special (1977) was broadcast on NBC on November 27, 1977. The film earned Hubley a posthumous Academy Award Nomination and posthumous Special Jury Prize at the Cannes Film Festival, tying with Oh, My Darling by Dutch animator Børge Ring.

== Personal life ==
On May 30, 1941, Hubley married Claudia Sewell, one of Disney's "ink and paint girls", in Reno, Nevada. The couple did not go on a honeymoon, and instead sped back to California to partake in the 1941 animator's strike, which had started the day prior. The Hubleys moved to a house at 10543 Woodbridge Street in the Toluca Lake section of Los Angeles. Their first child, Anne, was born in 1942. John and Claudia had two more children, Mark and Susan, while living at 11689 Laurelwood Drive in Los Angeles. Both houses were only a short drive from the UPA studio in Burbank.

Sometime in the 1940s, Hubley met Faith Elliott, a stage manager from New York City who had come to Los Angeles to become a script clerk at Columbia. Faith recalled she "met John in Hollywood...when he was in the Army". The two became friends and remained so during Hubley's time at UPA. When he was fired from UPA and began work on Finian's Rainbow, Yip Harburg assigned Elliott as Hubley's assistant. By all accounts, the relationship between them was platonic, with Elliott saying they "both... controlled their friendship for ten years and after all [Hubley] was a married man with three children". Nonetheless, as Elliott and Hubley grew closer, his own marriage crumbled. John and Claudia divorced in 1954, with his children staying in Los Angeles while he left to focus on Storyboard, Inc. in New York City.

Concept art for a character from Moonbird (1959) who was voiced by Hubley's stepson, Mark. Many of Hubley's independent films feature the voices of his children.

Hubley married Elliott in 1955. She had been born Faith Chestman in 1924, but kept the name of her first husband, Melvin Elliott, a radio announcer on WQXR. She already had one child, Mark, born in 1952. When the Hubleys married, they vowed to make one film per year together, and to have dinner with their family every night. They moved to the Upper West Side of New York City at 110 Riverside Drive, and had three more children: Raymond (Ray), Emily, and Georgia. All of the Hubley's children would voice characters in their films, with Mark and Ray appearing in Moonbird and Dig, and Emily and Georgia appearing in Windy Day and Cockaboody. All four are featured in Everybody Rides the Carousel. Ray later remembered "there were a lot of enforced things...in our family that [were] connected to the work regiment of [John and Faith's] relationship...they used to have a thing where we'd go around the table and tell [about] your day, and it was like a pitch meeting or something." Ultimately pursuing artistic careers of their own, Raymond became a film editor, Emily an animator, and Georgia co-founder of the band Yo La Tengo with her husband, Ira Kaplan. Given the nature of John and Faith's collaboration, she was sometimes overlooked professionally, with the attention and credit for their films given to her husband. John actively fought against this, highlighting Faith's contributions and their collaboration whenever possible. After his solo Academy Award win for Moonbird, he and Faith would be nominated together for the rest of their joint career. In the final interview before his death, in which he spoke with journalist Michael Barrier John said he thought Barrier would surely "write [the article] in terms of the partnership of me and Faith, because all of the films, right from the beginning of our stuff, from Guggenheim on up, have always been a very close collaboration, creatively and on every other level."

Hubley remained close with a number of UPA and Disney animators, many of whom he worked with on Storyboard, Inc. films. The Hubleys also became close friends with musician Dizzy Gillespie in the 1950s, meeting through mutual friend Paul Robeson. Gillespie made several films with Storyboard, Inc., including the Academy Award-winning The Hole. Gillespie "respect[ed] them and appreciate[d] their creativity", calling them "wonderful people, very warm and very generous" who "seem[ed] to see me in things other people don't see". Gillespie was a constant presence around the Hubley's house, with Mark Hubley remembering John and Faith "having parties [with Gillespie]" often, and Gillespie once "standing on his head playing 'Happy Birthday'" for Raymond. Hubley was also close with Benny Carter and Quincy Jones.

== Political views and HUAC investigation ==
Hubley was a lifelong registered Democrat. In 1951, the House Un-American Activities Committee (HUAC) heard the testimony of UPA layout artist Bernyce Fleury, who claimed Hubley's films promoted communism and Hubley held communist sympathies. On April 25, 1952, Hubley was formally subpoenaed by the HUAC to appear at the Los Angeles Federal Building for questioning. The subpoena was served to Hubley's attorney on May 2. While Hubley did leave UPA, he did not respond to the subpoena, and on February 2, 1953, Hubley was again summoned to the Federal Building for questioning. Boyle found that Hubley had moved in the year prior before receiving the subpoena, hence his lack of response. For an unknown reason, Hubley was not subpoenaed again until May 4, 1955, to appear before the HUAC. Hubley responded, and was set to appear before the HUAC on June 20, 1956. Hubley's attorney, Arthur McNulty, postponed the hearing twice, first until June 28, then to July 5, likely since Hubley had already moved to New York City.

On July 5, 1956, Hubley appeared before the HUAC in Room 227 of the Los Angeles Federal Building with McNulty as his counsel. California Representatives Clyde Doyle and Donald L. Jackson presided over the hearing. When asked if he held communist sympathies, Hubley responded "I feel that in the area of politics...I do not feel personally that your committee should ask me to reveal or speak on these matters, either with my opinions or associations...I do not agree it is a proper question for a person such as myself to be asked". Hubley invoked the Fifth Amendment for the remainder of the hearing. When asked if his films at UPA promoted communist ideas, Hubley replied:

I have a lot of opinions on art...It is public work, and anyone is welcome to examine it and to look at it, and I stand on my work, and not on my opinions. My opinions can change, and I have changed them many times, all through my life, and I like the right we have to be able to change them. But the work stands. I have no shame about it. If anyone wants to examine it, it is there...My work has been my own work, and my own talent, and my own opinions.

Hubley was never formally indicted by the HUAC, but the investigation did effectively blacklist him from Hollywood afterwards. He named his new studio Storyboard, Inc. out of fear of using his own name.

== Style and technique ==
An undated drawing by Hubley; many have noted his work's similarity to the art of Pablo Picasso.

While at UPA, Hubley's films were more flat and graphic than those of Disney Studios or Warner Bros. Cartoons. Hubley was greatly influenced by Ivan Ivanov-Vano's The Tale of Czar Durandai (1934), which used limited animation and flat compositions to create an incredibly stylized world. While Hubley's early UPA films featuring The Fox and the Crow animate the main characters in a style similar to that of Disney Studios, the films' backgrounds showcase Hubley's influence from European design. Punchy De Leon opens with a panning shot of a highly stylized graphic background that uses skewed perspective, large blocks of color, and exaggerated shape language. Hints of Hubley's stylization of background perspectives and crows shots can also be seen in Robin Hoodlum and The Magic Fluke.

After UPA finished its trial run with Columbia in 1950, Hubley's films became more visually ambitious. As the supervising director of Gerald McBoing-Boing, Hubley oversaw the film's unique visuals provided by designer Bill Hurtz and colorists Herb Klynn and Jules Engel. Rooty Toot Toot uses complex color blocking to tell its story visually, and implements even stronger skewed perspective and stylized line art backgrounds. Unlike Gerald Mc-Boing Boing, which uses abstract blocks of color in its backgrounds, Rooty Toot Toot experimented with different patterns and brush types. The film's last act is illustrated in the style of sponge painting, pulling inspiration from European abstract expressionist artists. This push towards replicating brush strokes and printmaking in backgrounds extended to the animated segments Hubley directed for The Four Poster.

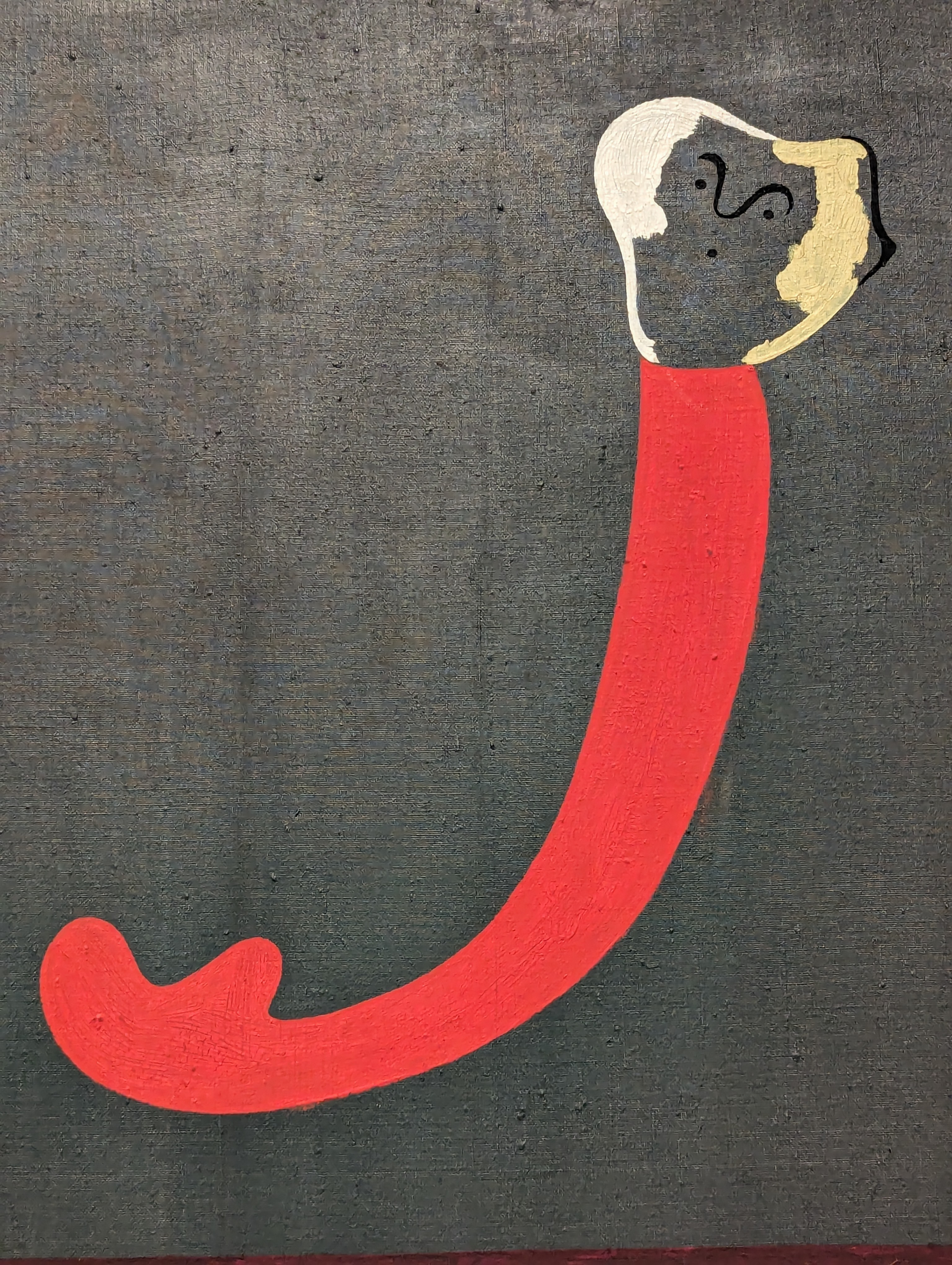
Detail of Painting (1938) by Joan Miró; the face on this figure is remarkably similar to that of the main character in The Adventures of * (1957).

For his independent directorial debut, The Adventures of *, Hubley drew heavily from the visual style of artists like Paul Klee, Joan Miró, and Pablo Picasso. The film's backgrounds were painted with sponges and thick brushes for texture. The characters were drawn in yellow crayon on black paper to give them a more unique, handmade look. In subsequent films, Hubley would experiment with watercolors, ballpoint pen, and fabric markers to give his films distinctive visuals. Hubley used both cels and the Xerox method (popularized by Ub Iwerks on the 1961 film One Hundred and One Dalmatians) depending on the film. For Cockaboody, characters were drawn on paper by Tissa David, then cut out and placed on cels. Hubley sometimes opted to use underlighting - wherein the drawing or cel is lit from below rather than above - to make the films more distinct, and often used multiple exposure for more complex elements, like the river in Tender Game or the abstract color section in Everybody Rides the Carousel.

While directing The Ragtime Bear, Hubley encouraged actor Jim Backus to improvise his dialogue and ramble on as his character Mr. Magoo would. Bauckus' unique vocal performance would make Mr. Magoo a hit, becoming UPA's flagship character. The idea of using improvised dialogue in animation was not created by Hubley, as Dave Fleischer often encouraged his actors to make up their own dialogue for his Popeye and Betty Boop shorts, but the success of Backus as Mr. Magoo inspired Hubley to pursue stream of consciousness improvisation for his independent films. Hubley took the idea a step further by recording his children playing together, interpreting their conversations through animation after Faith had edited them together into a story. Films like The Hat, The Hole, and Everybody Rides the Carousel consist entirely of improvised conversations between actors, and Zuckerlandl! is an animated interpretation of a comedy routine by Robert M. Hutchins.

Many of Hubley's films at Storyboard, Inc. with his wife explore war and the nature of conflict. The Hat, The Hole, Eggs, Voyage to the Next, and Urbanissimo tackle industrialization, war, overpopulation, and the environment, all subjects the Hubleys were highly concerned with. Hubley, himself an avid reader of psychology books, also looked to explore complex psychological theories in his films, as he believed animation to be the perfect medium to visualize such intricate ideas. Fittingly, the Hubleys taught a class at Yale called "The Visualization of Abstract Themes". Hubley was also fascinated with the way children discussed life and their own experiences, which can be seen in Moonbird, Windy Day, and Cockaboody.

== Death, preservation and legacy ==
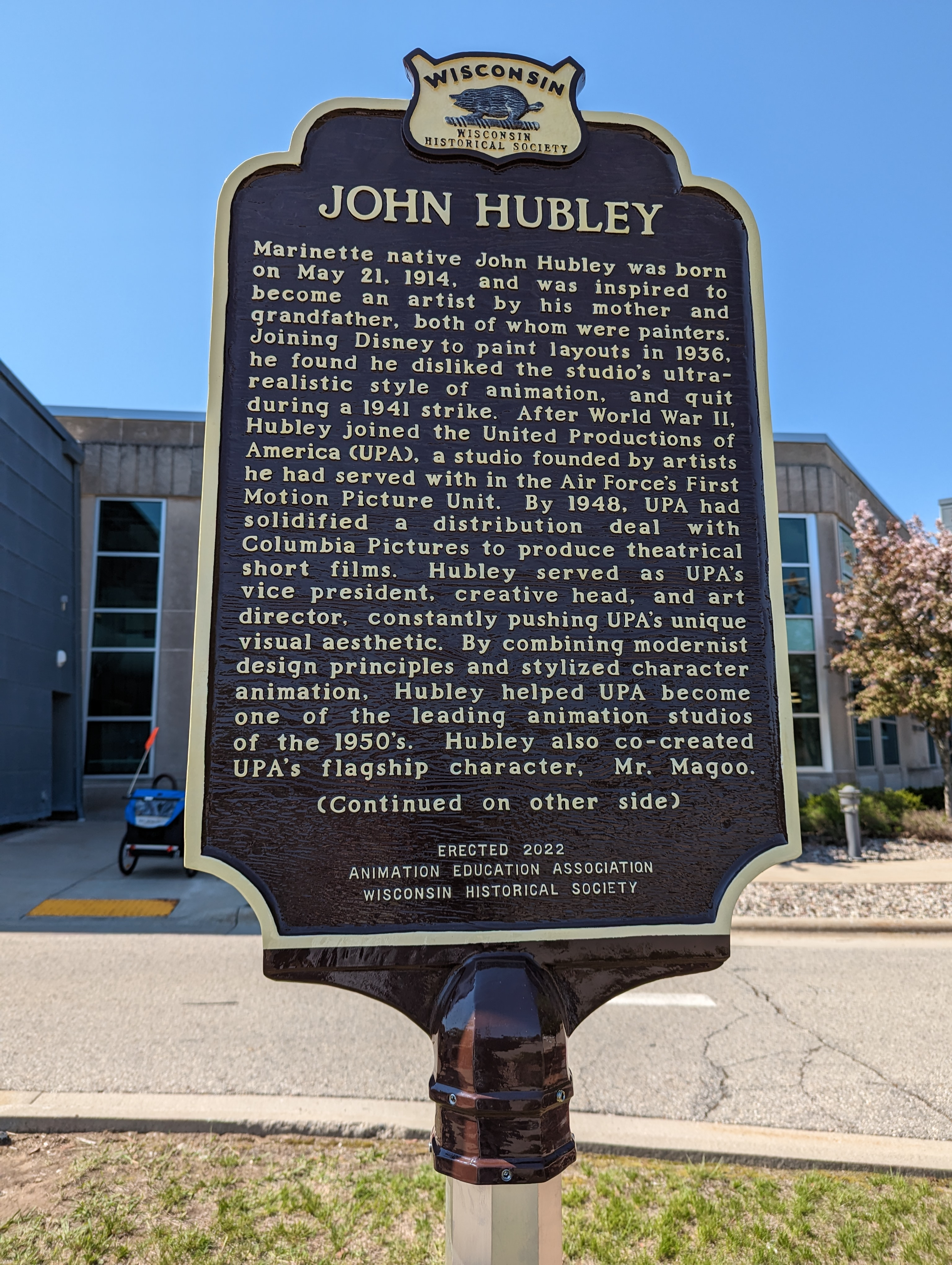
A Wisconsin Historical Marker for John Hubley at the Stephenson Public Library in Marinette.

During the production of A Doonesbury Special, Hubley went to the Yale New Haven Medical Center for what was thought to be a standard heart procedure. Hubley died during the surgery on February 21, 1977, at the age of 62. A Doonesbury Special was completed by his wife and Garry Trudeau, earning John Hubley a posthumous Academy Award nomination and Palme d'Or win. Hubley was cremated, and his ashes were spread over the Atlantic Ocean.

During his life and after his death, retrospectives and screenings of Hubley's films have been held all over the world. The Museum of Modern Art held a major two-part exhibition on the Hubleys' films and artwork in 1997 and 1998, and the Academy of Motion Picture Arts and Sciences held a salute to Hubley in 2011. Mr. Magoo, a character co-created by Hubley, would become one of the most famous cartoon characters of all time, ranking #29 on TV Guide's "50 Greatest Cartoon Characters of All Time" list in 2002. Hubley is often cited as one of the most influential figures in the history of animation, influencing artists such as Michael Sporn, Gene Deitch, and his own daughter, Emily Hubley. On October 2, 2022, Garry Trudeau's Doonesbury ran a strip encouraging readers to watch Hubley's Windy Day.

Eight of Hubley's films (Moonbird, The Hole, A Herb Alpert & The Tijuana Brass Double Feature, Windy Day, Of Men and Demons, Voyage to the Next, A Doonesbury Special, and A Smattering of Spots - a reel of Storyboard, Inc. commercials) are preserved in the Academy Film Archive. Papers from Hubley's life are held at the Solomon R. Guggenheim Museum, the Harvard University Library, the Yale University Library, the Museum of Modern Art, and the Academy of Motion Picture Arts and Sciences. In 2013, The Hole was selected for preservation in the United States National Film Registry by the Library of Congress for being "culturally, historically, or aesthetically significant". Artwork from Moonbird, Windy Day, Cockaboody, and several other of the Hubleys' films are on display at the Academy Museum of Motion Pictures in Los Angeles.

In 2021, a crowdfunded campaign headed by the Animation Education Association to have a Wisconsin State Historical Marker for Hubley placed in Marinette, Wisconsin, reached its goal. The marker was unveiled on May 20, 2023. To coincide with the unveiling, May 20, 2023, was proclaimed "John and Faith Hubley Day" in Wisconsin by Marinette's mayor Steve Genisot.

== Selected filmography ==
=== Screen Gems ===
- Concerto in B Flat Minor (1942) (writer)
- Wolf Chases Pigs (1942) (writer)
- Old Blackout Joe (1942) (with Paul Sommer)
- The Dumbconscious Mind (1942) (with Sommer)
- King Midas, Junior (1942) (with Sommer)
- The Vitamin G-Man (1943) (with Sommer)
- Professor Small and Mister Tall (1943) (with Sommer)
- He Can't Make It Stick (1943) (with Sommer)
- The Rocky Road to Ruin (1943) (with Sommer)

=== UPA ===
- Brotherhood of Man (1945) (writer)
- Flat Hatting (1946)
- Robin Hoodlum (1948)
- Swab Your Choppers (1948)
- The Rover Boys in Peril (1948)
- The Magic Fluke (1949)
- Ragtime Bear (1949)
- The Sailor and the Seagull (1949) (with Robert Cannon)
- Spellbound Hound (1950) (with Pete Burness)
- Punchy de Leon (1950)
- The Miner's Daughter (1950) (with Cannon)
- Trouble Indemnity (1950) (with Burness)
- Gerald McBoing-Boing (1951) (Oscar winner)
- The Popcorn Story (1950) (with Art Babbitt)
- Bungled Bungalow (1951) (with Burness)
- The Family Circus (1951) (with Babbitt)
- Barefaced Flatfoot (1951)
- Rooty Toot Toot (1951)
- Georgie and the Dragon (1951) (with Cannon)
- Fuddy Duddy Buddy (1951)
- The Wonder Gloves (1951) (with Cannon)
- Grizzly Golfer (1951) (with Burness)
- Sloppy Jalopy (1952) (with Burness)

=== Format Films ===
- The Tale of Old Whiff (1959)

=== Storyboard and Hubley Studios ===
- A Date with Dizzy (1956)
- Adventures of * (1957)
- Harlem Wednesday (1957)
- Tender Game (1958)
- Moonbird (1959) (Oscar winner)
- Children of the Sun (1960)
- Of Stars and Men (1962)
- The Hole (1962) (Oscar winner)
- The Hat (1964)
- Fail-Safe (1964)
- A Herb Alpert and the Tijuana Brass Double Feature (1966) (Oscar winner)
- Urbanissimo (1966)
- The Cruise (1967)
- Windy Day (1968) (Oscar nominee)
- Zuckerkandl! (1968)
- Of Men and Demons (1969) (Oscar nominee)
- Eggs (1970)
- Dig (1972)
- Cockaboody (1973)
- Voyage to Next (1974) (Oscar nominee)
- People, People, People (1975)
- Everybody Rides the Carousel (1976)
- A Doonesbury Special (1977) (Oscar nominee)
- Watership Down (1978) (uncredited)
- The Cosmic Eye (1986) (archive footage)

TV

- Sesame Street ("Imagination E", 1969)
- Sesame Street ("O Song", 1969)
- Sesame Street ("Polar Bear & Exit", 1970)
- Sesame Street ("Small V", 1970)
- Sesame Street ("F for Football", 1971)
- Sesame Street ("Baby Fantasy", 1971)
- Sesame Street ("Birds 1-20", 1971)
- Sesame Street ("Penguin Rhythms", 1971)
- Sesame Street ("Hungry M", 1971)
- Sesame Street ("Letter S", 1972)
- The Electric Company ("The Adventures of Letterman", 1972)
