= The Cosmic Eye =

- Directed by: Faith Hubley
- Produced by: Faith Hubley
- Starring: Dizzy Gillespie; Maureen Stapleton; Jack Warden
- Music by: Benny Carter; Elizabeth Swados; Dizzy Gillespie; Conrad Cummings; William Russo
- Production company: Hubley Studio
- Distributed by: Upfront
- Release date: June 6, 1986 (New York City)
- Running time: 72 minutes
- Country: United States
- Language: English

The Cosmic Eye is a 1986 American animated independent science fiction film produced and directed by Faith Hubley, and featuring the voices of Dizzy Gillespie, Maureen Stapleton and Jack Warden.

== Plot ==
A trio of homeward-bound space musicians, suffering from acute nostalgia on their space boat The Cosmic Eye, decided to take a turn over the Milky Way and sympathetically helping Earth while watching several films about contacting life in the cosmos and yearning for peace.

== Voice cast ==
- Dizzy Gillespie as Musician/Father Time
- Linda Atkinson as Musician
- Sam Hubley as Musician
- Maureen Stapleton as Mother Time
- Jack Warden as Rocko

== Release ==
The film was released on VHS months before theatrically playing in New York City on June 6, 1986. It was released on VHS again in 1990 from Buena Vista Home Video, and 1993 by Lightyear Video.

== Reception ==
Vincent Canby of The New York Times gave the film a mixed review, calling it “an unusually pretty film but, like its title, it's also a bit intimidating.”

Michael Wilmington of the Los Angeles Times gave the film a positive review, writing that it “is as joyous and heartening a movie as you’ll find all year. This eye winks, flutters, stares unabashedly and sees to the heart.”

== See also ==
- Moonbird - The 1959 Academy Award for Best Animated Short winner that is featured on the 1986 film
