= Emily Hubley =

American filmmaker and animator

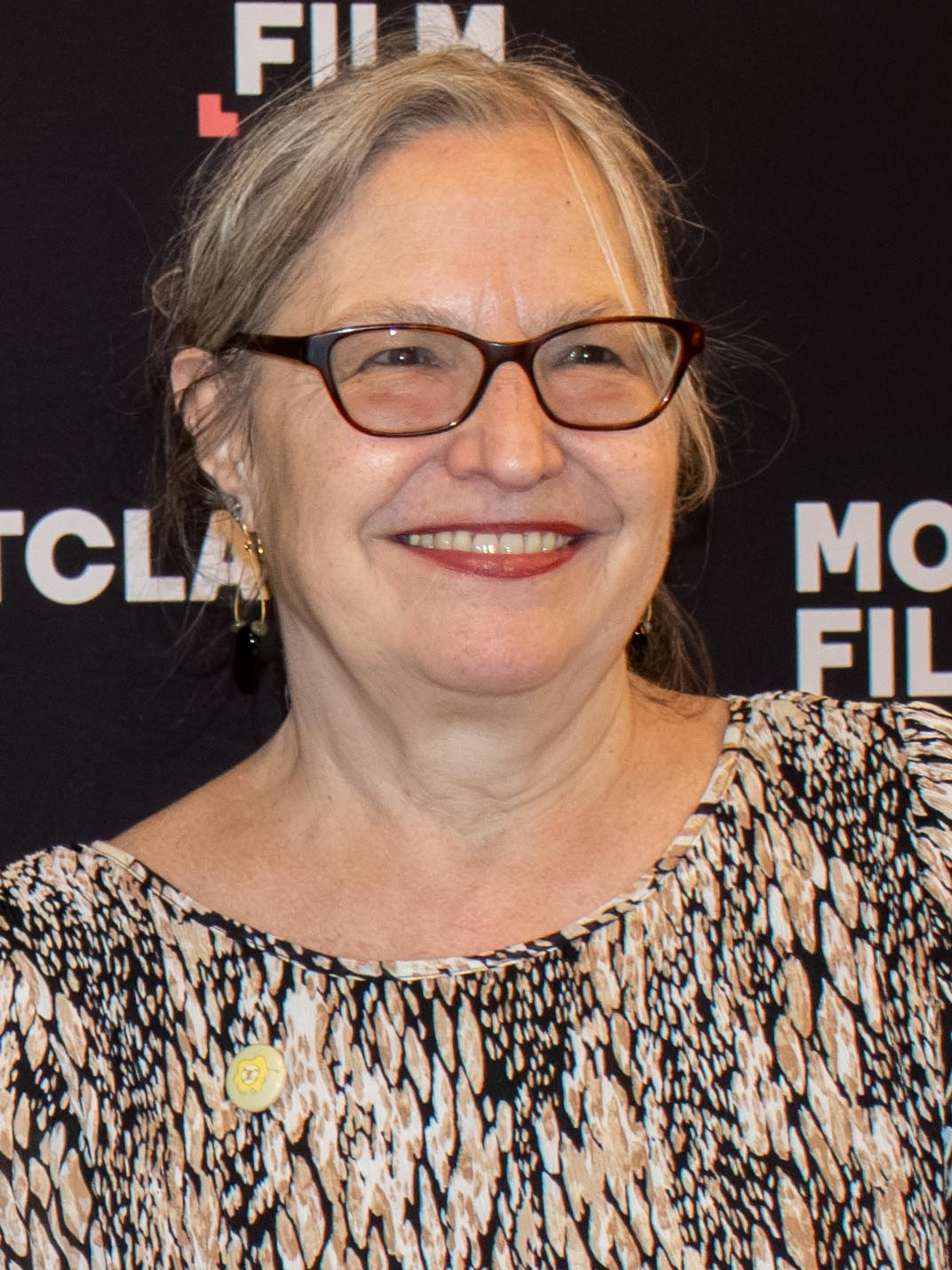
Hubley in 2024

Emily Hubley is an American filmmaker and animator.

== Personal ==
Emily Hubley is the daughter of animators Faith and John Hubley.

== Filmmaker and producer ==
Emily Hubley worked on films at the Hubley Studios from 1977 to 2001. After more than two decades of making numerous short films, providing animated segments for documentaries such as Blue Vinyl and the musical feature Hedwig and the Angry Inch, Emily Hubley made her first feature, The Toe Tactic which opened at the Museum of Modern Art in January 2009 and was released on DVD by Kino International.

Among her shorts are Octave, Pigeon Within, Her Grandmother's Gift (in collaboration with her mother Faith), The Tower (in collaboration with her sister Georgia Hubley), and Delivery Man. In 2010, she completed a series of animated pieces for Motherhood: Out Loud, a play presented at Hartford Stage between February and March 2010. Other animated sequences were provided by Emily Hubley and Jeremiah Dickey to the documentary Everything’s Cool by Judith Helfand and Dan Gold, and The Boy in the Bubble by Barak Goodman and John Maggio. Other projects have included work for Disturbing the Universe: Radical Lawyer William Kunstler, directed by Emily and Sarah Kunstler, and What's On Your Plate? directed by Catherine Gund. Her company, Hubbub Inc, also created a short form series for the cable networks Nickelodeon and Lifetime.

== Filmography ==
- The Tower (1984, short film)
- Blake Ball (1988, short film)
- Enough (1994, short film)
- Her Grandmother's Gift (1995, short film)
- The Girl with Her Head Coming Off (1997, short film)
- One Self: Fish/Girl (1998, short film)
- Pigeon Within (2000, short film)
- Octave (2005, short film)
- The Toe Tactic (2008, feature film)
- Hail (2011, short film)
- And/Or (2012, short film)
- Brainworm Billy (2018, short film)
- Nico, From Danny Says (2015, short film)
