= Zuckerkandl! (film) =

1968 animated film

Zuckerkandl! is a 1968 animated film directed by John Hubley. Narrated by Robert Maynard Hutchins, a former president of the University of Chicago and dean of Yale Law School, it was made into a comic book of the same name. The film profiles the fictitious philosopher Alexander Zuckerkandl and can be interpreted as a parody of Sigmund Freud.

== See also ==
- List of American films of 1968
