= Everybody Rides the Carousel =

- Directed by: John Hubley
- Written by: John Hubley; Faith Hubley
- Produced by: John Hubley; Faith Hubley
- Music by: William Russo
- Production company: Hubley Studios
- Distributed by: Hubley Studios; Image Entertainment (DVD)
- Release date: 10 September 1976
- Running time: 72 min.
- Country: United States
- Language: English

Everybody Rides the Carousel is a 1976 American independent animated film based on Erikson's stages of psychosocial development. It was directed by John Hubley and written and produced by Hubley and his wife Faith. Among the cast are Meryl Streep, Dinah Manoff, and Lane Smith and other members of the Hubley Family. The film was broadcast on television by CBS on September 10, 1976. Cicely Tyson hosts the special.

== Plot ==
This animated special follows the eight stages of human development, from birth to death, according to Erikson's Eight-Stage Theory Of Psychosocial Development. The stages are: trust versus mistrust (infancy), autonomy versus shame and doubt (toddlerhood), initiative versus guilt (young childhood), competence versus inferiority (middle childhood), identity versus role confusion (teenagehood), intimacy versus isolation (young adulthood), generativity versus stagnation (parenthood), and integrity versus despair (elderhood).

== Cast ==
=== Prologue ===
- Alvin Epstein

=== Stage 1 ===
- Judith Coburn
- Ray Hubley
- Lou Jacobi
- Lane Smith
- Eleanor Wilson

=== Stage 2 ===
- Georgia Hubley
- Linda Washburn
- Maura Washburn
- Michael Washburn

=== Stage 3 ===
- Emily Hubley
- Bruce E. Smith
- Jane E. Smith

=== Stage 4 ===
- Leeds Atkinson
- Jenny Lumet

=== Stage 5 ===
- Jo-Carroll Dennison

=== Stage 6 ===
- Charles Levin
- Meryl Streep

=== Stage 7 ===
- Per Bloland
- Dee Dee Bridgewater
- Tulani Bridgewater
- Pablo Casals
- Dinah Manoff
- Florence Miller
- George Miller
- Lawrence Pressman
- John Randolph
- Lanna Saunders
- William Watts

=== Stage 8 ===
- Harry Edison
- Jack Gilford
- Jane Hoffman
- Juanita Moore

== See also ==
- List of American films of 1975
