= Moonbird =

- Directed by: John Hubley
- Produced by: Faith Hubley; John Hubley
- Starring: Mark Hubley (voice); Ray "Hampy" Hubley (voice)
- Animation by: Robert Cannon; Ed Smith
- Release date: January 29, 1959
- Running time: 10 minutes
- Country: United States
- Language: English

Full short

Moonbird is a 1959 short animated film by John Hubley and Faith Hubley in which two boys have an adventure in the middle of the night as they sneak out and try to catch a 'Moonbird' and bring it home. The film was animated by Robert Cannon and Ed Smith. It won an Oscar for Best Short Subjects (Cartoons) at the 32nd Academy Awards, in 1960.

== Production ==
Moonbird featured the voices of the Hubley's sons, Mark and Ray ("Hampy"). For the Moonbird, the Hubleys secretly recorded the boys sharing an imaginary adventure before going to sleep in the darkness of their room. Their parents afterwards took the tapes and created an animated film to fit their sons' story.

== Accolades ==
In 1960, the film became the first independent short to win the Academy Award for Best Animated Short.

== Synopsis ==
The cartoon shows the little boys climbing out their bedroom window and going on a quest for the Moonbird, trying to trap the Moonbird, and otherwise obsessed with the Moonbird which we see following them about from place to place, leaping in and out of their trap, and in general keeping an eye on them.

== Availability ==
The film has lapsed into the public domain.

The Academy Film Archive preserved Moonbird in 2003.
