= The Hole (1962 film) =

1962 film by John Hubley

The Hole is a 15-minute American animated film by John Hubley and Faith Hubley. It was released in 1962, and it discusses the then-popular topic of nuclear warfare.

== Summary ==
The film uses improvised dialogue from Dizzy Gillespie and George Mathews as two construction workers at work in the bottom of a hole on a construction site. They discuss the possibility of an accidental nuclear weapons attack.

== Accolades ==
The film won an Academy Award for Best Animated Short Film in 1963.

== Legacy ==
In 2013, the film was selected for preservation in the United States National Film Registry by the Library of Congress as being "culturally, historically, or aesthetically significant". The Academy Film Archive preserved The Hole in 2003.
