= 1956 in animation =

Events in 1956 in animation.

== Events ==
=== January ===
- January 14: Chuck Jones' Bugs' Bonnets premieres, produced by Warner Bros. Cartoons, starring Bugs Bunny and Elmer Fudd.
- January 27: William Hanna & Joseph Barbera's Tom and Jerry cartoon The Flying Sorceress, produced by MGM's Cartoon Studio, premieres.
- January 28: Robert McKimson's Sylvester and Hippety Hopper cartoon Too Hop to Handle premieres, produced Warner Bros. Cartoons. Also starring Sylvester Jr.

=== February ===
- February 24: Jack Kinney's Donald Duck cartoon Chips Ahoy premieres, produced by Walt Disney Animation Studios. Also starring Chip 'n' Dale (making their final appearance in the Golden Age of Animation).
- February 25: Chuck Jones' Broom-Stick Bunny is first released, produced by Warner Bros. Cartoons, starring Bugs Bunny and Witch Hazel.

=== March ===
- March 10: Chuck Jones' Rocket Squad premieres, produced by Warner Bros. Cartoons and starring Daffy Duck and Porky Pig.
- March 21: 28th Academy Awards: Speedy Gonzales, produced by Warner Bros. Animation, wins the Academy Award for Best Animated Short.
- March 23: William Hanna & Joseph Barbera's Tom and Jerry cartoon The Egg and Jerry, produced by MGM's Cartoon Studio, premieres. It is a CinemaScope remake of the 1949 Tom and Jerry short Hatch Up Your Troubles.
- March 24: Friz Freleng's Tweety and Sylvester cartoon Tweet and Sour premieres, produced by Warner Bros. Cartoons. Also starring Granny & Sam Cat.
- March 31: Chuck Jones' Pepé Le Pew cartoon Heaven Scent premieres, produced by Warner Bros. Cartoons. Also starring Penelope Pussycat.

=== April ===
- Gene Deitch becomes head of animation at Terrytoons until August 1958.
- April 28: Friz Freleng's Rabbitson Crusoe premieres, produced by Warner Bros. Cartoons, starring Bugs Bunny and Yosemite Sam.

=== May ===
- May 4: William Hanna & Joseph Barbera's Tom and Jerry cartoon Busy Buddies, produced by MGM's Cartoon Studio, premieres.
- May 5: Chuck Jones' Wile E. Coyote and Road Runner cartoon Gee Whiz-z-z-z-z-z-z premieres, produced by Warner Bros. Cartoons.
- May 19: Friz Freleng's Tweety and Sylvester cartoon Tree Cornered Tweety premieres, produced by Warner Bros. Cartoons. The short is a parody of the popular police procedural franchise Dragnet.
- May 27: Peter Foldes and Joan Foldes' A Short Vision airs during an episode of The Ed Sullivan Show and causes controversy over its anti-atomic power message.

=== June ===
- June 2: Robert McKimson's Sylvester cartoon The Unexpected Pest premieres, produced by Warner Bros. Cartoons.
- June 16: Friz Freleng's Bugs Bunny cartoon Napoleon Bunny-Part premieres, produced by Warner Bros. Cartoons.
- June 23: Friz Freleng's Tweety and Sylvester cartoon Tugboat Granny premieres, produced by Warner Bros. Cartoons. Also starring Granny (as the short title implies).

=== July ===
- July 7: Robert McKimson's Daffy Duck cartoon Stupor Duck, produced by Warner Bros. Cartoons is released.
- July 21: Chuck Jones' Bugs Bunny cartoon Barbary Coast Bunny premieres, produced by Warner Bros. Cartoons. Also starring Nasty Canasta.
- July 26: Pete Burness' Mr. Magoo cartoon Magoo's Puddle Jumper, produced by UPA, premieres.

=== August ===
- August 18: Robert McKimson's Bugs Bunny cartoon Half-Fare Hare premieres, produced by Warner Bros. Cartoons. The short features caricatures of Ralph Kramden and Ed Norton from the TV series The Honeymooners.

=== September ===
- September 1: Robert McKimson's Sylvester and Hippety Hopper cartoon The Slap-Hoppy Mouse premieres, produced by Warner Bros. Cartoons. Also starring Sylvester Jr.
- September 7: William Hanna & Joseph Barbera's Tom and Jerry cartoon Muscle Beach Tom, produced by MGM's Cartoon Studio, premieres.
- September 15: Friz Freleng's A Star Is Bored premieres, produced by Warner Bros. Cartoons. Starring Bugs Bunny, Daffy Duck, Yosemite Sam, and Elmer Fudd.
- September 29: Chuck Jones' Deduce, You Say! premieres, produced by Warner Bros. Cartoons, starring Daffy Duck and Porky Pig.

=== October ===
- October 13: Friz Freleng's cartoon Yankee Dood It premieres, produced by Warner Bros. Cartoons, starring Elmer Fudd and Sylvester (marking the last time that the two are paired-up together in the Golden Age of Animation).
- October 21: William Hanna & Joseph Barbera's Tom and Jerry cartoon Down Beat Bear, produced by MGM's Cartoon Studio, premieres.
- October 27: Robert McKimson's cartoon Wideo Wabbit premieres, produced by Warner Bros. Cartoons, starring Bugs Bunny and Elmer Fudd.

=== November ===
- November 10: Chuck Jones' Wile E. Coyote and Road Runner cartoon There They Go-Go-Go! premieres, produced by Warner Bros. Cartoons.
- November 16: The Tom and Jerry cartoon Blue Cat Blues is first released, produced by the Metro-Goldwyn-Mayer cartoon studio. It features a controversial ending in which the duo commit suicide by waiting on a railroad track for the train to come. Contrary to urban legend, though, it is not the final episode of the series. The final short produced at Metro-Goldwyn-Mayer was Tot Watchers in 1958, and the final short overall was Purr-Chance to Dream, produced by Chuck Jones in 1967.

=== December ===
- December 8: Robert McKimson's The Honey-Mousers, a spoof of The Honeymooners, produced by Warner Bros. Cartoons, premieres.
- December 14: William Hanna & Joseph Barbera's Tom and Jerry cartoon Barbecue Brawl, produced by MGM's Cartoon Studio, premieres.
- December 15: Chuck Jones' Bugs Bunny and Wile E. Coyote cartoon To Hare Is Human premieres, produced by Warner Bros. Cartoons.
- December 16: The first episode of The Gerald McBoing-Boing Show airs on CBS. Broadcast at 5:30 p.m. on Sunday evenings, it was a showcase for UPA's cartoons, including Dusty of the Circus, The Twirlinger Twins, and Punch and Judy. The program proved too expensive to continue and lasted only three months.

=== Specific date unknown ===
- Ivan Ivanov-Vano's The Twelve Months is released.
- Te Wei's The Proud General is released.
- Walt Disney Productions shuts down its shorts division. Disney shorts would only be produced on a sporadic basis from this point on.

== Films released ==
- October 24 - The Heavenly Creation (Soviet Union)
- December 31 - The Twelve Months (Soviet Union)

== Television series ==
- May 1 - The Gumby Show debuts on CBS and in syndication.
- Specific date unknown - The Gerald McBoing-Boing Show debuts on CBS.

== Births ==
=== January ===
- January 3: Mel Gibson, American actor (voice of John Smith in Pocahontas, Rocky in Chicken Run, himself in The Simpsons episode "Beyond Blunderdome").
- January 9: Imelda Staunton, English actress and singer (voice of Bunty in Chicken Run, and Chicken Run: Dawn of the Nugget, Mrs. Santa in Arthur Christmas, Aunt Lucy in the Paddington franchise, Queen Victoria in The Pirates! In an Adventure with Scientists!, Ivy and Angorra in The Snow Queen, and Elspeth and Rowena in The Snow Queen's Revenge).
- January 12: Ellen Byron, American television writer and producer (The Fairly OddParents, The Tom and Jerry Show, Bunsen Is a Beast).
- January 21:
  - Robby Benson, American actor and singer (voice of Beast in the Beauty and the Beast franchise, House of Mouse, and Once Upon a Studio, the title character in The Legend of Prince Valiant, Blaze in P.J. Sparkles, Drake in Dragonheart: A New Beginning, young Santa Claus in The Life & Adventures of Santa Claus, Wilkes in the Batman: The Animated Series episode "P.O.V.", Archibald Seedplot in The Magic School Bus episode "Goes to Seed", David in The Greatest Adventure: Stories from the Bible episode "David and Goliath").
  - Geena Davis, American actress (voice of Huntara in She-Ra and the Princesses of Power, Yorito Sasaki in When Marnie Was There, Persephone in the Doc McStuffins episode "Sir Kirby and the Plucky Princess").
- January 22: Michael Kopsa, Canadian actor (voice of Beast in X-Men: Evolution, Roger Baxter in Littlest Pet Shop, Char Aznable in Mobile Suit Gundam), (d. 2022).
- January 24: Peter Woodward, English actor (voice of Ra's al Ghul in Batman: The Brave and the Bold, Dick Dastardly in Wacky Races, Edwin Carbunkle in Postman Pat: The Movie).
- January 26: Pat Musick, American voice actress (voice of Tony in the An American Tail franchise, Harold Frumpkin in Rugrats and All Grown Up!, Ursa Gummi in Adventures of the Gummi Bears, Fiddler Pig in House of Mouse, Janine Melnitz in Extreme Ghostbusters, Fluffy, Uranus and Charles in Duckman, Snuffy in A Troll in Central Park, Snappy Smurfling in The Smurfs, April in Saber Rider and the Star Sheriffs, Elsa Frankenteen in Scooby-Doo and the Ghoul School and the OK K.O.! Let's Be Heroes episode "Monster Party", Mary Ann in The Sylvester & Tweety Mysteries episode "A Chip Off the Old Castle", Mrs. Osgood in the Static Shock episode "Jimmy", Martha Wayne in the Batman: The Brave and the Bold episode "Dawn of the Dead Man!", Aldo in the ThunderCats episode "The Forever Bag", Dolphina in the Sofia the First episode "The Secret Library: Tale of the Eternal Torch").
- January 27: Susanne Blakeslee, American actress (voice of Wanda in The Fairly OddParents, Lady Tremaine in Cinderella II: Dreams Come True and Cinderella III: A Twist in Time, Cruella de Vil in 101 Dalmatians II: Patch's London Adventure and House of Mouse, Kala in The Legend of Tarzan, Sayd in Green Lantern: The Animated Series, Valeriana in Amphibia, the Evil Queen in Shrek the Third).

=== February ===
- February 3:
  - Nathan Lane, American actor (voice of Timon in The Lion King franchise and Once Upon a Studio, Preed in Titan A.E., Spot Helperman/Scott Leadready II in Teacher's Pet).
  - Lee Ranaldo, American musician and member of Sonic Youth (voiced himself in The Simpsons episode "Homerpalooza").
- February 7:
  - Bob Camp, American animator, writer, cartoonist, comic book artist, storyboard artist, director, and producer (The Ren & Stimpy Show).
  - Emo Philips, American comedian and actor (voice of Cuber in Adventure Time, Meeks Servant in Phineas and Ferb the Movie: Candace Against the Universe, Emo in Dr. Katz, Professional Therapist, Shannon in Home Movies, Dooper in Slacker Cats, Karl in TripTank, Dennis O'Bannon in Welcome to the Wayne).
- February 12: Arsenio Hall, American actor, comedian, talk show host, film producer and writer (voice of Winston Zeddemore in The Real Ghostbusters, Dr. Carver and Bobby Proud in The Proud Family Movie, Captain Crothers in Scooby-Doo! Pirates Ahoy!, Carl Cristall in Igor, Vernell Lewis in the Moon Girl and Devil Dinosaur episode "Roller Jam!").
- February 15: Olga Merediz, American actress (voice of Maestra Beatriz in the Dora the Explorer episode "School Pet", Mrs. Marquez in the Go, Diego, Go! episode "Diego Saves the Humpback Whale", Felicia in the Elena of Avalor episode "Flower of Light", singing voice of Alma Madrigal in Encanto).
- February 25: Thomas W. Lynch, American television writer and producer (co-creator of Class of 3000).
- February 28: Lloyd Sherr, American actor (voice of Banutu Jibolba in Tak and the Power of Juju, Father in Star Wars: The Clone Wars, Captain Dread in the Teenage Mutant Ninja Turtles episode "Escape from the Planet of the Turtleoids", continued voice of Fillmore in the Cars franchise).

=== March ===
- March 1: Tim Daly, American actor and producer (voice of Superman in Superman: The Animated Series, Superman: Brainiac Attacks, Superman/Batman: Public Enemies, Superman/Batman: Apocalypse, and Justice League: Doom, Bizarro in Superman: The Animated Series, Tatsuo Kusakabe in My Neighbor Totoro).
- March 7: Bryan Cranston, American actor and filmmaker (portrayed Walter White in The Simpsons episode "What Animated Women Want", voice of Joe Thax in Eagle Riders, Mr. Jamieson in Lilo & Stitch: The Series, Bill Publisherman and Mr. Winthrop in American Dad!, Hal Wilkerson, Dr. Jewish, Bert, Arby's Executive and Judge in Family Guy, Drake Stone in Glenn Martin, DDS, Jim Gordon in Batman: Year One, Vitaly in Madagascar 3: Europe's Most Wanted, Dr. Fis, Mr. Oxnard and Graham Kensington in The Cleveland Show, Li in Kung Fu Panda 3, Chief in Isle of Dogs, Titanium Rex in SuperMansion, Stradivarius Cain in The Simpsons episode "The Spy Who Learned Me", himself in the Family Guy episode "Herpe the Love Sore").
- March 11:
  - Rob Paulsen, American actor and comedian (voice of Yakko Warner, Pinky, and Dr. Otto von Scratchansniff in the Animaniacs franchise, Raphael and Donatello in the Teenage Mutant Ninja Turtles franchise, Carl Wheezer in The Adventures of Jimmy Neutron: Boy Genius, PJ in Goof Troop, the title character in The Mask: Animated Series, Fowlmouth in Tiny Toon Adventures, Major Glory in Dexter's Laboratory, Gladstone Gander in DuckTales, Gusto Gummi in Adventures of the Gummi Bears, Magister Patelliday and Rhomboid Vreedle in the Ben 10 franchise, Reuben in the Lilo & Stitch franchise, second voice of Arthur in The Tick).
  - J.J. Sedelmaier, American animator, illustrator, designer, author, director, and producer (TV Funhouse, Beavis and Butt-head).
- March 13: Dana Delany, American actress (voice of Lois Lane in the DC Animated Universe, The Batman, Superman: Brainiac Attacks, and Justice League: The Flashpoint Paradox, Andrea Beaumont in Batman: Mask of the Phantasm, Gwen Bowman in Wing Commander Academy, Loana in the Justice League Unlimited episode "For the Man Who Has Everything", Vilsi Vaylar in the Batman: The Brave and the Bold episode "The Super-Batman of Planet X!", Dr. Susan Fox in the Duckman episode "Role with It").
- March 16: Stephen Sustarsic, American television producer and writer (Disney Television Animation, The Pink Panther, Mighty Max, Exosquad, Bump in the Night, Duckman, Dilbert, Xiaolin Showdown, Danny Phantom, Loonatics Unleashed, World of Quest, Fanboy & Chum Chum, WordGirl, Johnny Test, Xiaolin Chronicles, co-creator of The Wild Thornberrys), (d. 2018).
- March 24: William Wray, American cartoonist, animator and landscape painter (The Ren & Stimpy Show).
- March 29: John Debney, American composer and conductor (Walt Disney Animation Studios, Hanna-Barbera, Dink, the Little Dinosaur, Tiny Toon Adventures, Piggsburg Pigs!, Jimmy Neutron: Boy Genius, Looney Tunes: Back in Action, The Ant Bully, Barnyard, Everyone's Hero, Yogi Bear, Ice Age: Collision Course).

=== April ===
- April 8: Diane Michelle, American actress (voice of Lashina in Superman: The Animated Series, Candice in Batman: The Animated Series, Daisy Duck in Mickey Mouse Works and Mickey's Once Upon a Christmas, Lila in Barbie of Swan Lake, Jane Jetson in the Harvey Birdman, Attorney at Law episode "Back to the Present", additional voices in The Garfield Show and Happy Feet).
- April 9: Mark Thomas, British composer (Shaun the Sheep, The Magic Roundabout), (d. 2023).
- April 12: Andy García, American actor, director and musician (voice of Eduardo in Rio 2, Don Quixote in Dora the Explorer, King Fialkov in 3Below: Tales of Arcadia, Slick Publisher in The Simpsons episode "The Book Job", Hetz in the Elena of Avalor episode "Coronation Day").
- April 14: Keith Crofford, American former television producer (co-founder of Williams Street).
- April 18: Eric Roberts, American actor (voice of Mongul in Justice League and Justice League Unlimited, Dante in Dante's Hell Animated, Dark Danny in the Danny Phantom episode "The Ultimate Enemy", Petey in the Todd McFarlane's Spawn episode "The Mindkiller").
- April 19: Mo Henry, American film negative cutter (Thumbelina, Aladdin and the King of Thieves, Space Jam, Anastasia, Quest for Camelot, Rudolph the Red-Nosed Reindeer: The Movie, The Prince of Egypt, The Iron Giant, The Road to El Dorado, Titan A.E., Shrek franchise, Osmosis Jones, Spirit: Stallion of the Cimarron, Looney Tunes: Back in Action, Shark Tale, The Polar Express, Madagascar franchise, Hoodwinked!, Over the Hedge, The Ant Bully, Kung Fu Panda, Strange Magic, Ice Age: Collision Course), (d. 2024).
- April 21: John Walker, American film producer and actor (Pixar, The Iron Giant, Osmosis Jones).
- April 23:
  - Kevin Meaney, American actor and comedian (voice of Aloysius Pig in Garfield and Friends, John in Duckman, Computer in The Brave Little Toaster to the Rescue, Widow Hutchison in the Rocko's Modern Life episodes "The Big Question" and "The Big Answer", himself in the Dr. Katz, Professional Therapist episodes "Bystander Ben", "Henna" and "Ball and Chain"), (d. 2016).
  - Caroline Thompson, American novelist, screenwriter, film director, and producer (The Nightmare Before Christmas, Corpse Bride).
- April 30: Michael Wright, American actor and animator (Sausage Party), (d. 2026).

=== May ===
- May 5: Marva Hicks, American singer and actress (choir performer in The Brave Little Toaster Goes to Mars), (d. 2022).
- May 7: S. Scott Bullock, American voice actor (voice of Dash Baxter in Danny Phantom, Thunder in Teen Titans, King Goobot in The Adventures of Jimmy Neutron, Boy Genius, Emperor Bog in Butt-Ugly Martians, Dharman in Afro Samurai).
- May 10:
  - Jonathan Roberts, American screenwriter (Walt Disney Animation Studios, James and the Giant Peach, Monsters, Inc.).
  - Paige O'Hara, American actress and singer (voice of Belle in the Beauty and the Beast franchise, Mickey's Magical Christmas: Snowed in at the House of Mouse, Ralph Breaks the Internet, and Once Upon a Studio, Aleta in The Legend of Prince Valiant, Nicole in Rapsittie Street Kids: Believe in Santa).
- May 13:
  - Kirk Thornton, American voice actor, director and writer (voice of Jin in Samurai Champloo, Hajime Saito in Rurouni Kenshin, Don Patch in Bobobo-bo Bo-bobo, Jet Link in Cyborg 009, Kaname Ohgi in Code Geass, Igor in Persona 5: The Animation, Arnim Zola in Marvel Future Avengers, Shukaku in Naruto, Master Roshi in Dragon Ball Super, Green Goblin and Lizard in Marvel Disk Wars: The Avengers, Adam Warlock in The Avengers: Earth's Mightiest Heroes, Shadow the Hedgehog and Orbot in the Sonic the Hedgehog franchise).
  - Fred Melamed, American actor, comedian and writer (voice of The Magic Tree of Nowhere and Spirit of the Harvest Moon in Courage the Cowardly Dog, Gumbald and Punchbowl in Adventure Time, Dr. Goldman in F Is for Family, The Mayor in Rumble, Monk Receptionist in the Summer Camp Island episode "Radio Silence").
- May 15: Dan Patrick, American sportscaster, radio personality and actor (voiced himself in the Hercules episode "Hercules and the Big Games", the Clerks: The Animated Series episode "A Dissertation On The American Justice System By People Who Have Never Been Inside A Courtroom, Let Alone Anything About Law, But Have Seen Way Too Many Legal Thrillers", and the Clone High episode "Homecoming: A Shot in D'Arc").
- May 17: Bob Saget, American comedian, actor, television host and director (voice of Zoo Animal in Madagascar, Dash in Casper's Scare School, Party Marty in The Life & Times of Tim, Mike O'Malley, Galactus and Cable Guy in Robot Chicken), (d. 2022).
- May 19:
  - Steve Pepoon, American screenwriter (The Simpsons, The Wild Thornberrys), (d. 2025).
  - Tom Sito, American animator, animation historian and teacher (Walt Disney Animation Studios, Filmation).
- May 22: Claudio Rissi, Argentine actor (voice of Sargento Cruz in Fierro), (d. 2024).
- May 23: Cal Dodd, Irish-Canadian voice actor and singer (voice of Wolverine in X-Men: The Animated Series and X-Men '97, Rip Rockefeller in Rescue Heroes, Blackbeard and Toghrul in Time Warp Trio).
- May 30: Charles M. Howell IV, American television writer, producer and animator (Warner Bros. Animation, Snorks, WordGirl, The 7D).

=== June ===
- June 4: Keith David, American actor (voice of Goliath in Gargoyles, Dr. Facilier in The Princess and the Frog, King Andrias in Amphibia, the title character in Todd McFarlane's Spawn, The Cat in Coraline, Flame King in Adventure Time, Apollo in the Hercules franchise, Despero in the Justice League episode "Hearts and Minds", Atlas in the Teen Titans episode "Only Human", Husk in Hazbin Hotel).
- June 21: Arunee Nanthiwat, Thai voice actress (Thai dub voice of Chichi, Android 18 and Dende in Dragon Ball Z, Sailor Mars and Sailor Jupiter in Sailor Moon, Ranma Saotome in Ranma 1/2, Syaoran Li in Cardcaptor Sakura, Mai Kujaku in Yu-Gi-Oh! Duel Monsters), (d. 2025).
- June 22: Tim Russ, American actor (voice of Solomon in Sym-Bionic Titan, Prowler in the Spider-Man episode "The Prowler").
- June 25: Anthony Bourdain, American celebrity chef, author and travel documentarian (voice of Lance Casteau in the Archer episode "Live and Let Dine", himself in The Simpsons episode "The Food Wife", and the Sanjay and Craig episode "Snake Parts Unknown"), (d. 2018).
- June 26: Chris Isaak, American musician and actor (voice of Enoch in the Over the Garden Wall episode "Hard Times at the Huskin' Bee", Johnny Strum in the Sheriff Callie's Wild West episode "The Ballad of Sweet Strings", Seven in the Adventure Time episode "Walnuts & Rain").
- June 27: Philippe Adamov, French illustrator, animator and comics artist (Gandahar), (d. 2020).
- June 30: David Alan Grier, American actor and comedian (voice of Memnon in Hercules, Marlon in the Pinky and the Brain episode "TV or Not TV", Reuben in The Proud Family episode "Behind Family Lines").

=== July ===
- July 9: Tom Hanks, American actor (voice of Woody in the Toy Story franchise, the Conductor, Hobo, and Santa Claus in The Polar Express, David S. Pumpkins in The David S. Pumpkins Halloween Special, Cleveland Carr in Electric City, himself in The Simpsons franchise, and the Big City Greens episode "Cheap Show"), and producer (The Ant Bully, Electric City).
- July 11:
  - Rodney Saulsberry, American actor (voice of Willy in Xyber 9: New Dawn, Utwapo in Aaahh!!! Real Monsters, Robbie Robertson in Spider-Man, Phillip Rollins / Sparky in the Static Shock episode "Blast from the Past").
  - Sela Ward, American actress (voice of Calendar Girl in The New Batman Adventures episode "Mean Seasons").
- July 27: Betty Cohen, American businesswoman and media executive (founder and first president of Cartoon Network).

=== August ===
- August 5: Maureen McCormick, American actress (voice of Marcia Brady in The Brady Kids, Jancey in The Loud House episode "Future Tense").
- August 10: Peter Robbins, American former child actor (voice of Charlie Brown in A Charlie Brown Christmas, Charlie Brown's All Stars!, It's the Great Pumpkin, Charlie Brown, You're in Love, Charlie Brown, He's Your Dog, Charlie Brown, It Was a Short Summer, Charlie Brown and A Boy Named Charlie Brown), (d. 2022).
- August 12: Bruce Greenwood, Canadian actor and musician (voice of Batman in Young Justice, Batman: Under the Red Hood, Batman: Gotham by Gaslight, and Batman: Death in the Family, Chiron in Class of the Titans).
- August 13: Jacques Muller, French animator (Walt Disney Company, Warner Bros. Animation, Amblin, ILM), (d. 2018).
- August 14: Jackée Harry, American actress (voice of Jackée the Ripper in Clone High, Nurse in The Mighty B! episode "Bee Patients", Wanda in the American Dad! episode "For Black Eyes Only", Zizza in the Transformers: Robots in Disguise episode "The Buzz on Windblade", Tuca's Mother in the Tuca & Bertie episode "The Mole", Merle in the Moon Girl and Devil Dinosaur episode "Suit Up!").
- August 18: John Debney, American composer (Jetsons: The Movie, Runaway Brain, The Emperor's New Groove, Jimmy Neutron: Boy Genius, Chicken Little, The Ant Bully, Barnyard, Everyone's Hero, Yogi Bear, The SpongeBob Movie: Sponge Out of Water, Ice Age: Collision Course, Luck).
- August 21: Kim Cattrall, British and Canadian actress (voice of Dee in Producing Parker, Melinda Finster in the Rugrats episode "Mother's Day", Tami Margulies in the Duckman episode "The Tami Show", Chole Talbot and Fourth Simpsons Child in The Simpsons).
- August 23: Robert L. Manahan, American actor (second voice of Zordon in Power Rangers) and re-recording mixer (McGee and Me!, Beakman's World, Mighty Morphin Power Rangers, King of the Hill, Dilbert), (d. 2000).
- August 24: Gerry Cooney, American former professional boxer (voiced himself in The Simpsons episode "$pringfield (or, How I Learned to Stop Worrying and Love Legalized Gambling)").
- August 30: Frank Conniff, American actor, comedian, producer and writer (101 Dalmatians: The Series, Invader Zim).

=== September ===
- September 10: Desirée Goyette, American singer, composer, lyricist and voice over artist (sang in several Peanuts and Garfield specials, voice of Nermal in Garfield and Friends, Danse in Jem, Googi Goop in the Animaniacs episode "The Girl with the Googily Goop", Roxy in the Tiny Toon Adventures episode "Two-Tone Town", continued voice of Betty Boop and Petunia Pig).
- September 11: Victor Aaron, American actor (original voice of John Redcorn in King of the Hill), (d. 1996).
- September 13: Kathleen Helppie-Shipley, American voice actress (voice of Sweets in The Biskitts, Butterbear in The Wuzzles, Shannon in Pound Puppies) and animation producer (Warner Bros. Animation, Everyone's Hero, The Pirates Who Don't Do Anything: A VeggieTales Movie, Star Wars: The Clone Wars).
- September 16:
  - Peter Francis James, American actor (additional voices in Courage the Cowardly Dog).
  - David Copperfield, American magician (voiced himself in The Simpsons episodes "The Great Simpsina" and "Friend with Benefit").
- September 20: Gary Cole, American actor (voice of Harvey Birdman in Harvey Birdman, Attorney at Law, James Timothy Possible in Kim Possible, Mayor Fred Jones Sr. in Scooby-Doo! Mystery Incorporated, Principal Shepherd in Family Guy, Sergeant Bosco in Bob's Burgers, Brock Zero in Penn Zero: Part-Time Hero, Rodger Dunbarton in F Is for Family, Black Adam in Justice League Action, Edward MacDell in Big Mouth, Dirk Chunley in Q-Force, Sky Toronto in Trolls: The Beat Goes On!, Mark Armstrong in Stretch Armstrong and the Flex Fighters, Zeta in the Batman Beyond episode "Zeta").
- September 23: Peter David, American comic book writer and screenwriter (Young Justice, Ben 10, Roswell Conspiracies: Aliens, Myths and Legends), (d. 2025).
- September 26: Linda Hamilton, American actress (voice of Nemesis in Hercules, Madam Lorraine in DC Showcase: Jonah Hex, Susan in The New Batman Adventures episode "Chemistry", Stephanie Lake in the Batman Beyond episode "Meltdown").

=== October ===
- October 2:
  - Charlie Adler, American voice actor and director (voice of Ed Bighead, Bev Bighead, Mr. Dupette, and Gladys in Rocko's Modern Life, Buster Bunny in Tiny Toon Adventures, Spike in My Little Pony and Friends, Eric Raymond in Jem, Tex Hex and Deputy Fuzz in BraveStarr, the title characters, the Red Guy, and I.R. Baboon in Cow & Chicken, Ickis in Aaahh!!! Real Monsters, Professor Monkey-For-A-Head in Earthworm Jim, T-Bone in SWAT Kats: The Radical Squadron, MODOK in Ultimate Spider-Man, Avengers Assemble, and Spider-Man, Proctor Servantis, Blarney T. Hokestar, and Collectimus in Ben 10: Omniverse, Mr. Whiskers in Brandy & Mr. Whiskers, the Great Orsino in The Rocketeer, Doctor Doom and Sabretooth in The Super Hero Squad Show).
  - Mike Scully, American television writer and producer (The Simpsons, Napoleon Dynamite, co-creator of Duncanville).
- October 3: Hart Bochner, American actor (voice of Arthur Reeves in Batman: Mask of the Phantasm, Roland in The Legend of Prince Valiant episode "The Shadows of Destiny").
- October 4: Christoph Waltz, German and American actor (voice of Mandrake in Epic, Count Volpe in Guillermo del Toro's Pinocchio).
- October 7: Shinji Miyazaki, Japanese composer and arranger (Crayon Shin-chan, Pokémon).
- October 8:
  - Danny Jacob, American guitarist, songwriter and composer (Disney Television Animation).
  - Stephanie Zimbalist, American actress and daughter of Efrem Zimbalist Jr. (voice of Janet Van Dorn in the Batman: The Animated Series episode "Trial", Eve in The Greatest Adventure: Stories from the Bible episode "The Creation").
- October 18: Craig Bartlett, American animator (creator of Hey Arnold!, Dinosaur Train, and Ready Jet Go!).
- October 20: Peter Morwood, Irish novelist and screenwriter (Batman: The Animated Series, Gargoyles, Spider-Man Unlimited), (d. 2025).
- October 21: Carrie Fisher, American actress (voice of Princess Leia in The Star Wars Holiday Special and Robot Chicken: Star Wars Episode II, Angela in Family Guy, Roz Katz in the Dr. Katz, Professional Therapist episode "Thanksgiving"), (d. 2016).
- October 24: Holly du Rivage, American animation checker (Avengers Assemble, Hulk and the Agents of S.M.A.S.H.) and sheet timer (Adelaide Productions, Pocket Dragon Adventures, RoboCop: Alpha Commando, The Wacky Adventures of Ronald McDonald, Baby Looney Tunes, Film Roman, Ben 10, Ni Hao, Kai-Lan, Happily N'Ever After 2: Snow White—Another Bite @ the Apple, Bob's Burgers, Allen Gregory, Brickleberry, Dawn of the Croods, Harvey Girls Forever!, Duncanville, HouseBroken).
- October 28: Russell Marcus, American television producer and writer (Ricky Sprocket: Showbiz Boy, Wild Grinders, Packages from Planet X, creator of Brandy & Mr. Whiskers).
- October 29: Darrell Van Citters, American animator (Looney Tunes, Bill & Ted's Excellent Adventures), director (Sport Goofy in Soccermania, The Mr. Men Show, The Tom and Jerry Show, Tom and Jerry in New York) and author (founder of Renegade Animation).
- October 31: Swinton O. Scott III, American animator (The Simpsons, Rugrats, An American Tail: Fievel Goes West, Tiny Toon Adventures, Batman: The Animated Series), storyboard artist (DIC Entertainment, Marvel Productions, Teenage Mutant Ninja Turtles, Disney Television Animation, The Simpsons, Tiny Toon Adventures, What's New, Scooby-Doo?), background artist (The Addams Family), sheet timer (Warner Bros. Animation, The Angry Beavers, Cartoon Network Studios, The Spectacular Spider-Man, Film Roman, The Boondocks, G.I. Joe: Renegades, Curious George, Phineas and Ferb, The 7D, Stretch Armstrong and the Flex Fighters, Disenchantment, Paradise PD, Farzar), producer (C Bear and Jamal, Static Shock) and director (Film Roman, The Angry Beavers, God, the Devil and Bob, Futurama, What's New, Scooby-Doo?, Camp Lazlo, The Looney Tunes Show, Diary of a Wimpy Kid).

=== November ===
- November 2: Bob Jaques, Canadian-American animator (Nelvana, The Adventures of Teddy Ruxpin, Dennis the Menace, The Ren & Stimpy Show, What a Cartoon!, Looney Tunes Cartoons), storyboard artist (Teenage Mutant Ninja Turtles), sheet timer (Dennis the Menace, Cartoon Network Studios, Robotboy), voice director (The New Woody Woodpecker Show), writer (The Baby Huey Show, Space Goofs), producer and director (Mighty Mouse: The New Adventures, The Ren & Stimpy Show, Hanna-Barbera, The Baby Huey Show, Family Guy, The New Woody Woodpecker Show, The Oblongs, Ren & Stimpy "Adult Party Cartoon", My Life as a Teenage Robot, Uncle Grandpa, SpongeBob SquarePants, co-founder of Carbunkle Cartoons).
- November 5: Mark Kirkland, American animator (Hanna-Barbera) and director (The Simpsons, HouseBroken).
- November 10:
  - Kathy Waugh, American television writer (PBS Kids).
  - Peter Rangmar, Swedish comedian and actor (dub voice of Timon in The Lion King), (d. 1997).
  - Sinbad, American actor and comedian (voice of Roper in Planes, Uruho in The Lion Guard, himself in the Family Guy episode "Tales of a Third Grade Nothing", first voice of Mr. Smiley in Steven Universe).
- November 15: Jerry Rees, American film director and animator (The Brave Little Toaster).
- November 17: Kelly Ward, American actor and voice director (Hanna-Barbera, Disney Television Animation).
- November 21: Alessandra Valeri Manera, Italian screenwriter and songwriter (wrote the lyrics to the themes for the Italian dubs of Inspector Gadget, Dragon Ball, Dragon Ball Z, Dragon Ball GT, Batman: The Animated Series, The Incredible Hulk, Superman: The Animated Series, Saint Seiya, What's New, Mr. Magoo?, Beverly Hills Teens, Magical Princess Minky Momo, Creamy Mami, the Magic Angel, Persia, the Magic Fairy, Magical Emi, the Magic Star, Kodocha), (d. 2024).
- November 22: Richard Kind, American actor and comedian (voice of Bing-Bong in Inside Out, Tom in Tom and Jerry: The Movie, Molt in A Bug's Life, Mr. Willis in Our Friend, Martin, Mr. Dobbins in Tom Sawyer, Uncle Monty in Rapunzel's Tangled Adventure, Cheezel in Mickey Mouse Funhouse).
- November 26: Don Lake, Canadian actor, writer, and television producer (voice of Stu Hopps in Zootopia, Mr. Preston in Bill & Ted's Excellent Adventures, Mr. Sherman Finky in Pepper Ann, Mr. Naven in the Teacher's Pet episode "Always Knock the Postman Twice", Stan the Sewer Troll in the American Dragon: Jake Long episode "Old School Training", Bad Larry in the American Dad! episode "The 42-Year-Old Virgin", Harold Fervel in The Wild Thornberrys episode "Chimp Off the Old Block", Dr. Hogsbottom in the Summer Camp Island episode "I Heart Heartforde").

=== December ===
- December 1: Larry Charles, American comedian, actor, director, writer and producer (Dilbert).
- December 3: Michael Gough, American actor (voice of Gopher in the Winnie the Pooh franchise, Colonel Spigot in TaleSpin, Raphael in the final season of Teenage Mutant Ninja Turtles, Tim Scam in Totally Spies!, Lieutenant Steel in Ben 10).
- December 7:
  - Larry Bird, American former professional basketball player and coach (portrayed himself in Space Jam, voiced himself in the Futurama episode "Saturday Morning Fun Pit").
  - Mark Rolston, American actor (voice of Lex Luthor in Young Justice, Firefly in the DC Animated Universe, Captain Moore in Godzilla: The Series, Bill Doolin in The Legend of Calamity Jane).
- December 17: Peter Farrelly, American film director, screenwriter, producer, and novelist (Osmosis Jones, Ozzy & Drix).
- December 18: T. K. Carter, American actor (voice of Alex in Turbo Teen, Monstar Nawt in Space Jam, Anthony Julian in Jem, Rocksteady in The Transformers episode "Auto-Bop", Sledgehammer O'Possum in the What a Cartoon! episode "Sledgehammer O'Possum: What's Going on Back There?"), (d. 2026).
- December 27: Richard Raynis, American animator and television producer (DIC Entertainment, The Simpsons, Adelaide Productions, King of the Hill, Futurama).

=== Specific date unknown ===
- Cordell Barker, Canadian animator, film director, (The Cat Came Back, National Film Board of Canada, Strange Invaders, Runaway, Sesame Street, If I Was God...)
- Glenn Eichler, American television producer and writer (Rugrats, MTV Animation, The Mouse and the Monster, Sammy, Hey Joel, The Wrong Coast, The Emperor's New School, Bratz, Yes, Virginia).
- George Meyer, American television writer and producer (The Simpsons).
- Michael J. Deas, American painter and illustrator (painted the Columbia Pictures logo).
- Jon Walmsley, American musician and actor (voice of Christopher Robin in Winnie the Pooh and the Blustery Day, Flip and Boy in Oliver and the Artful Dodger).
- Biff Wiff, American actor (voice of Drifter and Sgt. Hind in Kiff), (d. 2025).

== Deaths ==
=== February ===
- February 24: Marian Richman, American actress (voice of Melissa Duck in The Scarlet Pumpernickel, Ralph Phillips' teacher in From A to Z-Z-Z-Z), dies at age 33.

=== April ===
- April 14: Christian Rub, Austrian-American actor (voice of Geppetto in Pinocchio), dies at age 70.

=== August ===
- August 1: Johnny Murray, American actor (voice of Bosko from 1930 to 1933), dies at age 52.

=== September ===
- September 5: William Pennell, American singer and actor (original voice of Bluto in Popeye), dies at age 67.
- September 19: Cecil Surry, American animator (Walt Disney Animation Studios, Walter Lantz Productions, Warner Bros. Cartoons, MGM, Hanna-Barbera, UPA) and comics artist, dies at age 49.
- September 29: Russ Dyson, American animator (Walt Disney Animation Studios, Warner Bros. Cartoons), commits suicide at age 50.

=== November ===
- November 10: Erdman Penner, Canadian screenwriter and producer (Cinderella, Sleeping Beauty, Lady and the Tramp), dies at age 51.
- November 14: Floyd Buckley, American actor (voice of Popeye from 1945 to 1946), dies from an aortal aneurysm at age 79.

== See also ==
- List of anime by release date (1946–1959)

== Sources ==
- Maltin, Leonard (1987). Of Mice and Magic: A History of American Animated Cartoons. New American Library. ISBN 0-452-25993-2.
