= Better Off Wet =

Better Off Wet may refer to:

- "Better Off Wet" (Dexter's Laboratory), an episode of Dexter's Laboratory
- "Better Off Wet" (Brandy & Mr. Whiskers), an episode of Brandy & Mr. Whiskers
