= List of My-Otome characters =

This article is a list of fictional characters who primarily appear in the My-Otome anime series and its OVAs—sequel My-Otome Zwei and prequel My-Otome 0: S.ifr. Additionally, this article also covers some characters' information from the My-Otome manga series.

== Garderobe Academy ==
=== Coral Otome ===
Arika in the manga

- Arika Yumemiya (アリカ・ユメミヤ)Voiced by: Mika Kikuchi (Japanese); Angie Beers (English): A main character of My-Otome. She enters Garderobe dreaming of becoming an Otome like her mother into the Coral class at rank 51, later progressing to rank 29. She possesses the Blue Sky Sapphire (蒼天の青玉, Souten no Seigyoku), a memento from her mother. It was initially believed that she might be the true heir of the throne, as she possesses the Blue Sky Sapphire. However, this is later revealed to be incorrect and she is indeed the daughter of Lena Sayers, the previous user of the gem. She forms a contract with Mashiro as a Coral Otome, and later as Meister Otome. In the sequel, she is shown to be able to channel a "Zwei" form of a Robe, thought to be the true form, which allows for immense strength. She frequently quotes sayings from her grandmother, who raised her. In the manga, Arika's role is somewhat reduced into that of a comedy sidekick, in favor of a different leading character. Arika has a childish innocence about her and a naivety that is taken advantage of by some of the other characters. She can be socially awkward, due to lack of contact with people while she was growing up. In battle she is a natural, quickly adapting to situations and never giving up. This gives her an advantage over the other Otome and allows her to surpass the other students in her class.
- Nina Wáng (ニナ・ウォン, Nina Won)Voiced by: Ami Koshimizu (Japanese); Kris Rundle (English): A main character of My-Otome. As the top Coral student, Nina dreams to become a great Otome to make Sergay, her adoptive father, proud. She dislikes Arika from the moment they meet although their relationship develops into friendship. Later in the series she receives the Ultimate Black Diamond (漆黒の金剛石, Shikkoku no Kongouseki) and in My-Otome Zwei the Neptune Emerald (海神の翠玉, Wadatsumi no Suigyoku) as an interim contract with Mashiro. In My-Otome Zwei, Nina gains the Neptune Emerald GEM (海神の翠玉, Wadatsumi no Suigyoku), her element is a Bident(A trident with two prongs instead of the usual three; in mythology, the god Neptune carried a Trident, while his brother Pluto, god of the underworld carried a Bident) and she has a special attack known as the Dash Cold Water Spout. In the manga, Nina obtains her own Meister GEM, called the Black Smoke Chrysoberyl (黒焔の金緑石, Kokuen no Kinryokuseki).
- Erstin Ho (エルスティン・ホー, Erusutin Hō)Voiced by: Minami Kuribayashi (Japanese); Lorie Barnes-Smith (English).: Arika's and Nina's roommate, from the country of Annan. Erstin mostly serves as a bridge between Arika and Nina, who don't get along very well. She's also part of the Coral class at rank 17, but is later demoted to rank 30. It is revealed later on that is a Schwarz member, summoning a Slave. She decided mid-battle to use her Slave to prevent Arika and Nina from fighting, however this results in her Slave being killed and alongside it, Erstin herself.
- Irina Woods (イリーナ・ウッズ, Irīna Uzzu)Voiced by: Kumiko Higa (Japanese); Leah Dubbin-Steckel (English): Irina is one of Arika's friends from the Aries Republic. She shows a love for technology and is under the tutelage of Yohko.
- Tomoe Marguerite (トモエ・マルグリット, Tomoe Maruguritto)Voiced by: Rie Tanaka (Japanese); Tracy Sutton (English): She is Coral No. 2 and a room attendant for Chie. On the outside she acts normal but is jealous of Arika's and Shizuru's relationship. Later in the series she joins to the Valkyries (a system similar to Otome's although its power source is Lena Sayers' body instead of Fumi Himeno's) and becomes a somewhat leader figure in the forces. As a Valkyrie she wears the Cursed Obsidian (呪詛の黒曜石, Juso no Kokuyōseki). In the Zwei series, she is no longer an Otome and chooses to become a presidential candidate for Aries.
- Lilie Adean (リリエ・アディーン, Ririe Adīn)Voiced by: Akiko Kimura (Japanese); Jillian Hannah (English): Lilie is a member of Arika's class and one of Chie's room attendants. She, Miya and Yayoi are always hanging out together. She and Yayoi become honorary Maki Maki members by Shiho. She is possibly the My-Otome incarnation of My-HiME character Sayuri Shino.
- Yayoi Alter (ヤヨイ・オールター, Yayoi Ōrutā)Voiced by: Kimiko Koyama: Another of Shiho's attendants and a girl with a very overactive imagination. She's from Lutetia Romulus. She and Lilie are made honorary Maki Maki members by Shiho.
- Miya Clochette (ミーヤ・クロシェット, Mīya Kuroshetto)Voiced by: Yui Itsuki (Japanese); Kelsey Schimpf (English): One of Shiho's room attendants. She is close friends with Tomoe. She's from Lutesia Remus.

=== Pearl Otome ===
- Akane Soir (アカネ・ソワール, Akane Sowāru): The top Pearl student and leader of the Trias. She becomes torn between her love for Kazuya and her dreams of becoming a Meister Otome (Ger. Jap. – literally 'Master Maiden'). The GEM she receives upon appointment as Meister is the Pure Heart Malachite (清恋の孔雀石, Seiren no Kujakuishi). Voiced by: Junko Iwao (Japanese); Morgan Partridge (English) She is a Meister Otome for Emperor Kazuya, also her lover. She has yet to lose her virginity in Zwei, as she is still able to call forth her materialisation.
- Chie Hallard (チエ・ハラード, Chie Harādo): Chie is Pearl number two and a member of the Trias. She is very boyish and often carries a blue rose around. Voiced by: Mitsuki Saiga (Japanese); Hazel Forman (English)

She is from the Aries Republic and seems to have some relationship with Aoi, paralleling their relationship from the first series. Chie remains calm and tries to help out whenever she can and balances out Shiho's aggressive behavior when dealing with student discipline. In episode 15 she tells Nao that she met Aoi when she started attending Garderobe. When Nao's gang was about to torture Miya's gang for attempting to rape Arika, Chie and Aoi showed up on the scene in which both Nao and Chie later took in Miya to interrogate. Later on, she said she was out on a date. When Mashiro was feeling depressed due to Takumi's words, Chie suggested to Aoi to bring in Arika to cheer her up which works and pulls both out of their depression. Chie was also aware that Tomoe Marguerite was involved in numerous plots to take out Arika Yumemiya but rather than report Tomoe she orders her to stop it. Despite knowing of the fact that Erstin Ho was injured during another plot, Chie kept silent about it for unknown reasons. At the end, it is revealed that she is Major Chie Hallard, a leader of Aries forces. She has taken it upon herself to infiltrate the ranks of the Schwarz-controlled Valkyrie Otome. She visits the unconscious, seriously injured Aoi in a hospital bed before leaving for her mission as a Valkyrie. In the end, she is reunited with Aoi and arrests Nagi.
In My-Otome Zwei, she's the leader of the Delta Strike Force and donning a robe reminiscent of a magician's tuxedo. She leads the force in dealing with the busjacking situation (which Arika Yumemiya was coincidentally involved with) alongside Pillar no. 1, Sara Gallagher, and Brigadier General Haruka Armitage, with the latter getting petrified by Yuma during the subsequent CHILD attack that ensured at the busjacking site.
In the manga version of My-Otome, Chie's role is far smaller. Without the antagonism of Tomoe or the existence of the Valkyries, both of which were major plot points in which her anime counterpart had a part to play, she becomes mainly a background character. Her importance is further downplayed by the fact that she still uses the standard Pearl Robe whereas her fellow members of the Trias use Meister-level Robes. She is still seen in the "group shot" of the Materialised Otome ready to do battle, though, and is seen briefly "dealing with" Shiho Munakata, offering a "taste of a real oneesama" as the Otome fight with the resurrected HiMEs, to the embarrassment of both Shiho Munakata and Shiho Huit.

- Shiho Huit (シホ・ユイット, Shiho Yuitto): Shiho is Pearl number three and the last member of the Trias. She is from Cardair. She is usually seen conspiring to get revenge on everyone else by using a strange voodoo doll. The GEM she wears in episode 24 is the Spiral Spin Serpentine (螺旋の蛇紋石, Rasen no Jamonseki). Voiced by: Sakura Nogawa (Japanese); Leda Davies (English)
- Juliet Nao Zhang (ジュリエット・ナオ・チャン, Jurietto Nao Chan): Pearl number four. She hails from Artai. She is a laid-back person, usually skipping classes and sneaking off of campus. However, she has been appointed as #4 of the Five Columns near the important part of the anime series, with the Break String Spinel (破絃の尖晶石, Hagen no Senshouseki) as her GEM. Voiced by: Yuuka Nanri (Japanese); Marcy Lannan (English)

=== Campus administration ===
- Natsuki Kruger (ナツキ・クルーガー, Natsuki Kurūgā): The Headmistress of Garderobe and #2 of the Five Columns. She handles Garderobe's affairs and is the one who directly deals with the heads of state. Her GEM is the Ice Silver Crystal (氷雪の銀水晶, Hyōsetsu no Ginsuishō). Voiced by: Saeko Chiba (Japanese); Cheryl McMaster (English) In the My-Otome manga, Natsuki Kruger is the headmistress of Garderobe. She is also the daughter of Aries' current president, Saeko Kruger, and the sister of Alyssa Kruger. Natsuki's main role in the story is running the Academy
- Shizuru Viola (シズル・ヴィオーラ, Shizuru Viōra): #3 of the Five Columns, known as the Bewitching Smile Amethyst (嬌嫣の紫水晶, Kyōen no Murasakisuishō). She acts as an assistant (AKA Deputy Headmistress) to Natsuki. Voiced by: Naomi Shindō (Japanese); Melanie Risdon (English)
- Maria Graceburt (マリア・グレイスバート, Maria Gureisubāto): An inactive Meister Otome serving as part of Garderobe's upper administration. Strict and often-unsmiling, Miss Maria is feared by the students and even the other faculty members. She is from Old Lutesia and wears the Eternal Recurrence Jasper (久遠の碧玉, Kuon no Hekigyoku). Voiced by: Yoko Matsuoka (Japanese); Barb Mitchell (English)
- Yukariko Steinberg (ユカリコ・シュタインベルグ, Yukariko Shutainberugu): The homeroom teacher for Nina and Arika as well as a Meister Otome. She is from Florince and wears the Dazzling Mirage Lapis Lazuli (幻惑の瑠璃, Genwaku no Ruri). Voiced by: Kikuko Inoue (Japanese); Barbara Kozicki (English)
- Yohko Helene (ヨウコ・ヘレネ, Yōko Herene): Much like her My-HiME counterpart, Yohko Sagisawa, she's the Chief Medical Officer and the Director of Science Department of Garderobe, who is in charge of handling the technology that gives the Otome their powers. She has some past relationship with Aswad. Voiced by: Akiko Kimura
- Fumi Himeno (フミ・ヒメノ): The first Otome who lived 300 years ago and possessed the ultimate GEM, the Pure White Diamond (真白なる金剛石, Mashiro naru Kongōseki). She is the source of power for the Otome at Garderobe.
- Sara Gallagher (サラ・ギャラガー, Sara Gyaragā): #1 of the Five Columns, wielder of the Galactic aquamarine (銀河の藍玉, Ginga no Rangyoku). She first appears in episode 24, bringing gifts to Aries from Zipang. Her robe is batgirl-inspired. Her elements are giant boomerangs. Apart from that, she can make herself invisible. She has a habit of correcting Haruka's mispronunciations. She was also the room attendant of Tokiha Mai.Voiced by: Miyuki Sawashiro
- Mahya Blythe (マーヤ・ブライス, Māya Buraisu): #5 of the Five Columns, wielder of the Swirling Dance Fluorite (伶踊の蛍石, Reiyō no Hotaruishi). She first appears in episode 24, arresting Akane after Kazuya was carried away by Cardair forces. She uses a pair of maracas to summon an immense creature composed of sand and earth that fights for her, shaking her maracas and dancing as a way to control the creature. Voiced by: Yumiko Kobayashi

== Former Columns (My Otome 0) ==
- Elliot Chandler – During the days of Sifr Fran, Elliot was Column I and was the wielder of the Galactamarine. In the anime she is shown to be extremely attracted to Lena Sayers, going so far as to corner her in her hotel room and to try to have relations with her, which Lena resists.
- Kyoko Shimabuki – During the days of Sifr Fran, Kyoko was Column II and was the wielder of the Whirlwind Rose Quartz. Her element is a giant axe, with a pink and red robe. Not much else is known about her except that she went along with Una Shamrock's plans, and in the end was suspended from Otome duties for a month by Maria Graceburt at the conclusion of My Otome 0.
- Rei Zarganote – During the days of Sifr Fran, Rei was Column III and was the wielder of the Intensely Playing Peridot. Her element is a large sword, much like Mikoto's from My-HiME, and her robe was orange and black. Not much else is known about her except that she went along with Una Shamrock's plans, and in the end was suspended from Otome duties for a month by Maria Graceburt at the conclusion of My Otome 0.
- Una Shamrock – During the days of Sifr Fran, Una was Column IV, Headmistress of Garderobe, and wielder of the Bewitching Smile Amethyst. She is set in eliminating Sifr, and even goes so far as to deauthorize Elliot as the Galactamarine to attack her. At the conclusion of My Otome 0, she is dismissed as Headmistress. It is unknown as to whether or not she remained a Column.
- Iruma Vandeveld – During the days of Sifr Fran, Iruma was Column V and wielder of the Ice Silver Crystal. Not much else is known about her except that she went along with Una Shamrock's plans, and in the end was suspended from Otome duties for a month by Maria Graceburt at the conclusion of My Otome 0.

== Windbloom Kingdom ==
- Mashiro Blan de Windbloom (マシロ・ブラン・ド・ヴィントブルーム, Mashiro Buran Do Vintoburūmu): The heir to the throne of Windbloom. She is initially very snobbish and childish, and is at odds with Arika. Mashiro is taunted by her staff and people to be a fake princess, as she is spoiled and appears not to inherit the wisdom of the previous rulers. However, she matures along the series and displays qualities of a true queen (the true heir revealed to be Nina Wang). Voiced by: Yukana (Japanese); Katie Rowan (English)
- Mikoto (ミコト): A fat black cat owned by Mashiro.
- Sakomizu Cardinal (サコミズ・カージナル, Sakomizu Kājinaru): Captain of Windbloom's Royal Guards, constantly frustrated by Mashiro's willful antics. Voiced by: Akio Suyama (Japanese); Randall Wiebe (English)
- Aoi Senoh (アオイ・セノー, Aoi Senō): Mashiro's long-suffering maid who supports her despite her childish behaviors. She is in a relationship with Chie Hallard. An indicator that she swings that way could be the expression on her face at the end of the bath scene in the third episode of My-Otome Zwei (7:25). Voiced by: Ryoko Shintani (Japanese); Jayna Mitchell (English)
- Mimi (ミミ): A young orphaned girl who lives in the slums of Windbloom. She hates Mashiro with a passion, a sentiment shared by many of Windbloom's poorer residents. Voiced by: Ai Shimizu

== Artai Principality ==
- Nagi Dài Artai (ナギ・ダイ・アルタイ, Nagi Dai Arutai): The Grand Duke of Artai. He appears to be manipulating political events. He also enjoys teasing Mashiro whom he has a love-hate relationship with and tries to actually take control of her country. Voiced by: Akira Ishida (Japanese); Graham Ko (English)
- Sergay Wáng (セルゲイ・ウォン, Serugei Won) Voiced by: Katsuyuki Konishi (Japanese); Phil Fulton (English): Commander in the Artai military and Nagi's right-hand man as well as Nina's adoptive father. Years ago, he fell in love with Arika's mother, Lena Sayers. In the manga, Sergay August Taiki is the prime minister of Windbloom and a colonel of its army. He originates from Artai and knows Nagi de Artai well. He adopts Nina and raised her after finding her amongst refugees. Sergay supports Arika financially in secret for her enrolment in Garderobe. He was gravely injured towards the end of My Otome and kept barely alive by the Harmonium. He is shown to be living with Nina in a countryside house, implied to not have memories of previous events. He and Nina start life anew.

Sergay behaves in a rather dark and sinister way most of the time – without displaying even the slightest bit of compassion his anime counterpart was known for. He sponsors the fake Mashiro's attendance in Garderobe in order to further his plans. He wants the boy fully under his control and often loses his temper when faced with Mashiro's vigor. Instead of the crush his anime counterpart had on Rena, this Sergay displays antipathy towards her, being unhappy that she is still alive. This Sergay is also older than his anime counterpart, as he is already depicted as a young adult when Rena is retiring from her service to the Windbloom throne, whereas he was only a child in the anime when Rena had already given birth to Arika.

- Tatsuhiko Gorvic Zaycech IV (タツヒコ・ゴロヴィッチ・ザイツェフIV世, Tatsuhiko Gorobitchi Zeishefu IV): A student from Artai. Voiced by: Hisafumi Oda (Japanese); Jeffrey Watson (English)
- Archduke Bel Glan De Artai – He ruled Artai during the events depicted in the series, though he appears to have paid more attention to women than to affairs of state, amassing a total of six wives and children numbering into double figures. His death resulted in a power struggle which was only ended with the rise to power of Nagi Daí Artai, presumably his son. A throwaway comment by his successor suggests that many of his sons followed in Bel's footsteps, marrying poorly, causing Nagi to suggest that he should have ordered his amenuensis Sergay Wáng to assassinate them as well as their husbands.

== Former Otomes ==
- Princess Sakura Hazakura – The Cherry Storm Chrysoberyl. A feisty Otome from the nation of Taiyun who serves Archduke Bel Glan De Artai during the time of Sifr Fran.

== Aries Republic ==
- Yukino Chrysant (ユキノ・クリサント, Yukino Kurisanto): The President of the Aries Republic and Haruka's master. She is assertive and portrays the image of a cool-minded leader. Voiced by: Mamiko Noto
- Haruka Armitage (ハルカ・アーミテージ, Haruka Āmitēji)Voiced by: Ryoka Yuzuki: A headstrong and impulsive Meister Otome who wears the Continental Orb Topaz (珠洲の黄玉, Suzu no Kōugyoku). She has impressive strength and immediately takes a liking to Arika. She somehow believes that to be a good Otome the person must have guts, which might be the reason why she does things without even thinking, sometimes including talking. In the alternate universe version of the original story, Haruka Armitage is a brigadier general in the Aries military and President Yukino Chrysant's Otome. This is a reversal of their My-HiME anime relationship, where Yukino was the one protecting Haruka. Haruka is a very aggressive fighter who prefers to charge into a situation rather than wait it out, as shown in the second OVA. She was formerly a member of the Trias, the top three performing Pearl Otome.

== Aswad ==
- Midori (ミドリ): The leader of Aswad. She has a serious personality, but gets along well with the people she leads. Voiced by: Yukari Tamura
- Rad (ラド, Rado): A cyborg who works under the command of Midori. He fights with a heavy double-ended spear. Possibly the younger brother of Arika's father, Shiro. Voiced by: Toshihiko Seki (Japanese); Ethan Cole (English)
- Lumen (ルーメン, Rūmen): Another member of Midori's unit, who possesses a man's voice but a woman's body and speech pattern. Lumen fights with long metallic whips. Voiced by: Naoya Uchida
- Gal (ガル, Garu): A cyborg skilled with electronics who fights with a chakram, which usually floats above her head like a halo. She speaks using a combination of Japanese and English words. She has motorised skates on her feet and two electronic chords on her head(which can be used to access data). In Zwei, she is referred to as "professor". Voiced by: Kikuko Inoue
- Dyne (ダイン, Dain): A massive cyborg and part of Midori's team. He fights with a double-ended hammer. Voiced by: Eiji Miyashita

== Zipang ==
- Takumi Tokiha (鴇羽 巧海 頭忠頼, Tokiha Takumi no Kami Tadayori) Voiced by: Yugo Takahashi: The son of the shogun of Zipang, traveling to Windbloom on a diplomatic mission. He turns out to be in search of Mai Tokiha from Garderobe, his sister who is lost after being torn apart between love and her future as an Otome years ago. Takumi is shown in the My-Otome anime as the lord and ruler of Zipang and the son of the Shogun. He has a very similar personality as his My-HiME incarnation, with the same name. During an official government visit, Takumi wanders off into Windbloom incognito, and meets Mashiro Blan de Windbloom, who uses the name of Nina Wáng, while Takumi uses the name Akira Okuzaki (who is actually his bodyguard pretending to be him at the palace). Takumi and Mashiro have a great time together walking around Windbloom, and he opens Mashiro's eyes to the poverty that exists in her country. Akira and the other Otome eventually find him, and Akira gives him medicine via a kiss when he begins having an attack of an unspecified illness. Takumi has a conversation later with Natsuki Kruger about Windbloom, and his opinion that giving a young girl the power of an Otome is too much of a burden, referencing his own connection to the Fire String Ruby, his older sister Mai Tokiha, a legendary Otome who was torn between being an Otome and her love for a man and disappeared. Takumi and Mai are reunited at the end of the series after Mai is found alive in the Black Valley. In the manga series Takumi is the ruler of Cardair, as Zipang did not exist in the manga. Takumi becomes king after the former emperor John's Otome is killed in action. In this incarnation Takumi uses a wheelchair and is more assertive compared to his My-HiME and My-Otome anime incarnations. Instead of being his bodyguard, Akira is his Otome. The two Akiras, the My-Otome and the revived HiME Akira from the My-HiME manga battle over Takumi, each claiming that he is theirs. He is later seen with Mashiro, indicating that the two countries are once again on good terms after past difficulties. He appeared to have a tense rivalry with Nagi Di Aratai, much the same with Sergey.
- Akira Okuzaki (尾久崎 晶, Okuzaki Akira)Voiced by: Sanae Kobayashi: In My-Otome Akira is the bodyguard of Takumi, who in this universe is the son of the shogun of Zipang. She poses as Takumi when he sneaks off during a diplomatic visit to Windbloom, only revealing herself after Mashiro Blan de Windbloom and Takumi inadvertently end up spending the day together while keeping their respective identities a secret. She then fights off a SLAVE and Arika Yumemiya as Takumi begins to have an attack of an illness (presumably the same illness as he had in My-HiME). She appears to have some level of disdain for Otomes, as when she is mistaken for an Otome by Arika she says "Don't group me with those fools" possibly because of the Otome Mai's unexplained disappearance, though Mai and Takumi are reunited at the end of the series and are seen together in the final scene while Akira scowls in the background.
- Iori (伊織): Takumi's attendant. Voiced by: Anri Katsu

== Cardair Empire ==
- Argos XIV (アルゴス14世, Arugosu 14): One of the three emperors of Cardair, who hires Aswad secretly. Voiced by: Tomoaki Ikeda
- Fiar Grosse (フィア・グロス, Fia Gurosu): The Excel Elegance White Onyx (塊麗の縞瑪瑙, Kenrei no Shimamenō), Argos XIV's Otome. She doesn't trust the Aswad, but she is very obedient to her master. Voiced by: Rie Tanaka
- Kazuya Krau-xeku (カズヤ・クラウゼク, Kazuya Kurauzeku): A second-year student at Windbloom University, and an heir to one of Cardair's three royal families. He is romantically involved with Akane. Voiced by: Kazuma Horie

== Florince ==
- Charles Guinel Roy d'Florince VIII (シャルル・ギュネール・ロイ・デ・フロリンス八世, Sharuru Gyunēru Roi De Furorinsu 8): The king of Florince. He seeks a new Otome to replace his retiring Otome, Rosalie. Voiced by: Mantarô Iwao
- Rosalie Claudel (ロザリー・クローデル Rozarī Kurōderu): The king of Florince's Otome, the Abyssal Green Jadeite (深淵の翡翠, Shin'en no Hisui). She plans to retire in order to marry. In My Otome Zwei, she appears in the baths with the other girls and confronts Shiho Huit, expressing her dislike for the girl. Her element is a whip. Voiced by: Mikako Takahashi

== United Kingdom of Lutesia ==
=== Lutesia Romulus ===
- The king of Lutesia Romulus
- Carla Bellini (カーラ・ベリーニ, Kāra Berīni): Lutesia Romulus' Otome, the Rumbling Thunder Garnet (雷鳴の柘榴石, Raimei no Zakuroishi). Voiced by: Kiyomi Asai

=== Lutesia Remus ===
- The queen of Lutesia Remus
- Laula Bianchi (ラウラ・ビアンキ, Raura Bianki): Lutesia Remus' Otome, the Flowery Splendour Enstatite (絢爛の頑火輝石, Kenran no Gankakiseki). Voiced by: Kikuko Inoue

== An Nam ==
- Nguyễn Bảo (グエン・バオ, Guen Bao): The king of An Nam. He first appears in episode 21 on a visit to Aries. Voiced by: Eiji Miyashita
- Ảnh Lữ (アイン・ルー, Ain Rū): Nguyễn's Otome and daughter, the Infinite Wisdom Azurite (慧命の藍銅鉱, Emyō no Randōkō). Famous for being unable to hold her alcohol. Her element is a double-ended halberd. Formerly she was Pearl #1. Voiced by: Ryoko Shintani

== Schwartz ==
- John Smith (ジョン・スミス, Jon Sumisu): The blond-haired spokesman of Schwartz, an organization dedicated towards using the technology of the past for some as yet unstated goal. Voiced by: Naoya Uchida
- Midori Sugiura (杉浦 碧, Sugiura Midori) There are not one but two Midoris in the My-Otome manga. The first Midori is the manga's leader of Schwarz, the cult taking the place of the manga-nonexistent Aswad and protecting the Black Valley. Like her My-HiME counterparts (and unlike her My-Otome anime version), she claims to fight for Justice. She was initially imprisoned in Garderobe and known as "Prisoner No. 17". Her prisoner transfer was conducted with Shizuru Viola and the Cardair Otome Rila Mariposa. Her Schwarz underlings attack the convoy and conduct her successful jailbreak. She proceeds to do battle with both Otome and kills Rila, escaping afterward. When Manshiro and his retinue go to the Black Valley in search of Arika Yumemiya's mother, she plans to have Arika join Schwarz, but this never comes to fruition. When Cardair forces attack to avenge their late Emperor John, who died because of his connection with Rila, Midori fights with Akira and is outwitted, leading to her defeat. Eventually Manshiro and Arika manage to fend off the Cardair forces and Garderobe personnel arrive. On Manshiro's request, the people of the Black Valley are moved to Windbloom. Midori leaves Manshiro a cryptic warning regarding Sergay and disappears along with the rest of her team.

Midori reappears when it is time for Manshiro's coronation. In disguise, she, Gal and Dyne enter Windbloom and manage to outsmart Haruka Armitage despite the latter's attempts at finding Schwarz members. When Sergay reveals his villainy and sets Mai Tokiha on Manshiro's entourage, Midori saves Manshiro and his group. Midori comments on the danger Manshiro has put himself into by having two Otome contracted to himself, but per his request, she leads the people of Windbloom out of the country, including Arika who suffered mental trauma. When the girl expresses her desire to return to fight for Manshiro, Midori gives her the REM despite the protests of her lackeys, saying that she wanted to "gamble with herself" and "believe that these children can win". The second Midori is Midori Sugiura revived from the dead, as previously seen in the My-HiME manga. She ambushes an off-guard Shizuru Viola (who is complacently wondering where her own second is) shortly before Midori arrives to assist her former enemy; the leader of Schwarz using Gal's power in place of her REM. Stating that she would not allow the Predecessor statue of Rena Sayers to be destroyed because she was the woman Rad sacrificed his life for, the two women do battle. Eventually, Midori Sugiura is killed by Manshiro's Trinity Lover Strike. Exactly what happens to Midori the leader of Schwarz is unstated, but given the appearance of her smiling visage as shown in the events after the return to peace, it would seem to be a happy ending for her.

== Other ==
- Mai Tokiha (鴇羽 舞衣, Tokiha Mai) Voiced by: Mai Nakahara (Japanese); Carol-Anne Day (English): A Meister Otome who went missing, creating the legend of the "Tragic Otome". Her GEM is the Fire Stirring Ruby (炎綬の紅玉, Enju no Kougyoku). Mai Tokiha name is same as the main character of Mai Hime and possesses the same abilities. In the My-Otome anime series, Mai Tohika is a much more relaxed and carefree person (much to Natsuki's consternation), but still has good cooking skills. Despite her attitude, she is knowledgeable about Otome and political affairs, due to her status as a princess. Mai's GEM is the Fire Stirring Ruby (炎綬の紅玉, Enju no Kōgyoku) (spelled Fire Starring Ruby in her My-Otome Zwei and My-Otome PS2 game materialization sequences). Mikoto the Cat Goddess swallowed the Gem's ring, making her Mai's master. During her materialization sequence, Mai's GEM displays "Unknown" as her contract. Apparently Mai does not need Mikoto's permission, but rather just a kiss on the GEM. In the My-Otome manga series, Mai first appears at the end of chapter 31, the first of the HiMEs to be revived by Fumi. Sergay calls her the strongest HiME from the legend of "Seven Days of Flame" who burnt the world to the ground, citing her as an example of the superiority of the original HiMEs over the modern 乙–type HiMEs.
- Lena Sayers (レナ・セイヤーズ, Rena Seiyāzu)Voiced by: Tomo Sakurai/Aya Endō (My-Otome S.IFR): Protagonist of the prequel OVA My-Otome S.ifr. In the original series, she was known as a legendary figure even among all Meister Otomes, the previous owner of the Blue Sky Sapphire GEM, and the royal Otome to the King of Windbloom, Bruce Banning Windbloom II. She was also known to have achieved happiness as both an Otome and a mother, willingly retiring from being an Otome later in life and having a child. Her ultimate fate is initially unknown, but we eventually learn that she died during the attack on Windbloom castle 16? years prior to the events of the main series (briefly shown at the beginning of Episode 1), as she fought off Schwarz while protecting the then-baby Princess Mashiro. Her body is then taken by Schwarz to be used as Schwarz's host of the Valkyrie system, using the same system of which the Founder Himeno Fumi powers the Otome system. Though only implied during much of the series, it is later confirmed she is the mother of Arika.

In the S.ifr series, we learn that Lena was incredibly powerful even as a student at Garderobe, and is known to have overloaded and shattered her Coral GEMs. As a Meister Otome, she initially wields the Meister GEM Lofty Crimson Jade (which is itself overloaded and destroyed in the events of S.ifr). She later acquires the Super Meister GEM Blue Sky Sapphire from her grandmother, and only this GEM is capable of channeling Lena's abilities without shattering.
Lena is revealed to be a descendant of Alyssa Searrs, and she has a HiME birthmark (though it visually matches that of Alyssa's and not the usual HiME mark). Through this mark, she is able to manifest the powers of the artificial Child, Artemis. Through Artemis, she is also able to employ the Blue Sky Sapphire's Robe without authorization, which then manifests a different form than the usual. In this form, she is able to overpower the simultaneous offense of the Five Pillars of her era.
In the My-Otome manga, Lena Sayers is Arika's mother and the fake Mashiro's adoptive Mother. The fake Mashiro was given to her to keep him safe if/when the real Mashiro, His sister, would try to bring Darkness to the world with her magic powers as foretold. Lena first appears in Chapter 20, residing in the Black Valley; she mistakes Mashiro Blan de Windbloom for Arika. It is revealed that her home village was destroyed mysteriously and she was rescued by Rad. During an attack by Cardair, Nina Wáng recognizes her as the previous user of the Blue Sky Sapphire. In the aftermath of the Cardair invasion of the Black Valley, she is brought to Garderobe for medical treatment, under the care of Juliet Nao Zhang.
Lena pushes Mashiro out of the way of Mai Tokiha's attack, causing herself to become fatally injured. After leaving Mashiro and Arika instructions on dealing with the HiMEs, Lena becomes the new Predecessor and enables the Otome to Materialise again.

- Miyu (ミユ): A mysterious traveller who watches over Arika. She is shown to be very knowledgeable about Otome matters, and helps Arika and Mashiro remove the Blue Sky Sapphire from its socket after they make an impromptu contract early in the series. She is an android who has lived for a long time, and knew Arika's mother. During the finale, she uses the DNA of Alyssa Searrs (from the bird Alyssa) to trigger the Guiding Star (HiME Star) to turn from Blue to Red, allowing all Otome to materialize their Robes without a contract or Authorization. Voiced by: Kiyomi Asai
- Alyssa (アリッサ, Arissa): Miyu's bird companion. The bird contains the DNA of the My-Otome incarnation of Alyssa Searrs.
- Mikoto the Cat Goddess: A resident of the Black Valley. Voiced by: Ai Shimizu (Japanese); Caitlynne Medrek (English) Mikoto the Cat Goddess is a separate entity from Mikoto the cat. She appears childish, similar to her My-HiME incarnations, but shows a better knowledge of combat and technology. She wears Buddhist robes and prayer beads around her neck and carries a traditional bronze staff shaped like a cat's head. She is inseparable from her Otome, Mai Tokiha; Mai herself states that despite attempting to escape, she was never successful.

Though unable to fly like other Otome, Mikoto the Cat Goddess is able to swing her staff powerfully and is very nimble. Mai states she has never defeated Mikoto in battle, even when materialized. Miyu states that Mikoto is the last person with natural materialization powers and calls her the "Crystal Princess." The Cat Goddess has a HiME mark in the same spot as her My-HiME incarnation. In the Black Valley, Mikoto has a series of cat statues which enable her to observe the world. She also had maintained a shadow version of herself to protect the Harmonium; the shadow form was defeated by Nina Wáng. In one of the DVD Omake chapters, Mikoto the cat is shown to be an Otome. Its "GEM," the ring in its left ear, displays "Cat No. 10" with an "Unknown" contract. It has a Coral GEM and fights in a Coral Robe, and does not appear to require contract confirmation and this cat appears as an Otome in the My-Otome PS2 game.
In the My-Otome manga Mikoto is a being who can switch between human and cat forms at will. She retains her catlike and curious aspects, but she is generally more malevolent. Mikoto, in addition to the ability to transform, is able to summon a Slave that resembles a cat form of the Child Miroku. She also can summon her real Child and is a capable fighter with her claws, on par with a Meister Otome. Mikoto also retains her sword Miroku, which she never fights with, and her HiME symbol is initially shown on her upper left arm. The symbol is moved to her tail when the rest of the HiME are revived.

- Yamada (ヤマダ): An information broker who works for Sergay and Nao. Voiced by: Hisanori Koyatsu

My-Otome 0: S.ifr

- Sifr Fran (シフル・フラン): Future queen of Windbloom and mother of Nina Wáng. Una Shamrock, the Headmaster of Garderobe, wanted her to be assassinated upon being captured by Schwartz because of her power as a Weaver.

Voiced by: Ami Koshimizu
