= Myotome (disambiguation) =

Myotome is the group of muscles that a single spinal nerve root innervates.

Myotome may also refer to:

- Myotome (embryology), part of a somite that forms the muscles of the animal
- My-Otome, an anime series created by Sunrise
  - My-Otome (manga), originally published from 2005 to 2006
