= List of Brandy & Mr. Whiskers episodes =

The following is an episode list for the Disney Channel Original Series, Brandy & Mr. Whiskers.

== Series overview ==
Season	Segments	Episodes	Originally released	
Season	Segments	Episodes	First released	Last released
1	41	21	August 21, 2004	August 12, 2005
2	36	18	February 3, 2006	August 25, 2006

== Episodes ==
=== Season 1 (2004–2005) ===
Note: All episodes in this season were directed by Timothy Björklund.

No. overall	No. in season	Title	Written by	Storyboard by	Original release date	Prod. code
1a	1a	"Mr. Whiskers's First Friend"	Russell Marcus	Tina Kügler	August 21, 2004	101a
Goofy-bunny Mr. Whiskers meets prissy-pooch Brandy Harrington within a cargo hold of a plane. When Whiskers mistakenly opens the hatch door, the pair is dropped into the Amazon Rainforest with no way home. Desperate and angry, Brandy makes a deal with the dictator lizard Gaspar: a way back to civilization in exchange for Mr. Whiskers as his dinner. In the end, she loses her way home, but truly gains a friendship with Lola Boa and Mr. Whiskers.
1b	1b	"The Babysitter's Flub"	Russell Marcus	Shawn Björklund	August 21, 2004	101b
Brandy volunteers to watch a crocodile's eggs for the day, but when Lola Boa and the Toucan Twin sisters Cheryl & Meryl invite her to hang out, she leaves Whiskers in charge. It goes about as well as you expect, with Whiskers losing the eggs and mixing them up with those of other animals. Now he and Brandy must retrieve the correct babies to avoid Mama Croc swallowing them whole.
2a	2a	"Cyranosaurus Rex"	Brandon Sawyer	Carson Kugler	August 21, 2004	102a
Spring is in the air as Whiskers falls in love for the first time: with a giant lizard, Isabel (Jennifer Hale). She wants nothing to do with the smelly rabbit, but Coach Brandy is determined that Whiskers can woo her. Meanwhile, Brandy has her own issues in fighting off a persistent little lemur (Charlie Adler & Jeff Bennett).
2b	2b	"To the Moon, Whiskers"	Russell Marcus	Rossen Varbanov	August 21, 2004	102b
While out star-gazing, the gang meet the cosmonaut monkey Boris (Greg Baldwin), having crash-landed into the jungle. Though his shuttle comes equipped with a rescue signal button, he refuses to push it and have the humans return him to space. While Brandy schemes to call for her own rescue, Mr. Whiskers is having fun playing spaceman and thwarting her.
3a	3a	"Lack of Brains vs. Brawns"	Bill Motz & Bob Roth	Chuck Klein	August 21, 2004	103a
Mr. Whiskers, being bullied by a cruel neighborhood monkey, must find the confidence to stand up for himself before it drives him away from Brandy. Meanwhile, Brandy is on a mission to increase her public image in the jungle. Instead, she learns the importance of standing by your friends, even the uncool ones.
3b	3b	"The No Sleep Over"	Russell Marcus	Zac Moncrief	August 21, 2004	103b
Brandy is hosting a girls-only slumber party and kicks Whiskers out, who forms one with Ed. Neither party is going too well until Whiskers begins a prank-war that quickly escalates into trouble for everyone.
4a	4a	"The Fashion Fascist"	Bill Motz & Bob Roth	Celia Kendrick	August 21, 2004	104a
Brandy wants to try to introduce fashion to the jungle. The jungle denizens proclaim Mr. Whiskers is a fashion genius.
4b	4b	"Happy Birthdays"	Russell Marcus	Fred Gonzales	August 21, 2004	104b
It's Brandy's birthday though she is unhappy because it's her first birthday away from her family. She believes that it's also Whiskers' birthday as well.
5a	5a	"Funky Bunny"	John Behnke & Rob Humphrey	Tina Kügler	August 28, 2004	105a
Brandy is preparing for the Harrington Ball, which is a formal dance that the Harringtons have every year, but with all the hard work she forgot to get herself a date! She has Whiskers, and has to teach him some proper etiquette.
5b	5b	"The Going Bananas Republic"	Brandon Sawyer	Shawn Björklund	August 28, 2004	105b
Brandy, disgusted with Gaspar's dictatorship, riles the jungle-dwellers to hold an election for king. She and Whiskers win the job, but quickly abuse the power just as bad as Gaspar, if not worse.
6a	6a	"Lame Boy"	John Behnke & Rob Humphrey	Chuck Klein	September 4, 2004	106a
Brandy stumbles across a suitcase, finds a portable video game inside it, and she gives it to Mr. Whiskers to get him to stop bothering her. In the end, he finally has to save Brandy from falling off a cliff.
6b	6b	"Taking Paws"	Brian Swenlin	Zac Moncrief	September 4, 2004	106b
Brandy and Whiskers invite a jaguar named Lorenzo (Bobby Slayton) to stay with them, but he ends up driving them up the wall.
7a	7a	"Skin of Eeeeeeeevill!!!"	Mark Palmer	Fred Gonzales	September 11, 2004	107a
Mr. Whiskers accidentally crushes Lola's shedded skin with a boulder, leading him to believe he killed her and get inside her skin to prevent Brandy from discovering his (supposed) crime.
7b	7b	"A Bunny on My Back"	Russell Marcus	Celia Kendrick	September 11, 2004	107b
An ocelot named Artaro (Jeff Bennett) catches Brandy's fancy, and they fall in love and plan to go out on a date. Mr. Whiskers has a sneaking suspicion that Artaro is actually evil, and he tries to tell Brandy. Unfortunately Mr. Whiskers gets covered in tree sap and stuck on Brandy just before the date and when they both end up going out, Mr. Whiskers' assumptions about Artaro turn out to be true.
8a	8a	"Lucky Rabbit's Feet"	Amy Wolfram	Rossen Varbanov	September 18, 2004	108a
When Mr. Whiskers finds out about luck, he believes his feet will provide him with the luck he needs to remain safe and get anything he wants, much to Brandy's dismay.
8b	8b	"Blind Ambition"	Russell Marcus	Carson Kugler	September 18, 2004	108b
Brandy introduces the concept of currency to the jungle and discovers it's hard to live a life of luxury when you have to earn your finances.
9a	9a	"Dear Diary"	Scott Peterson	Rossen Varbanov	September 25, 2004	109a
When Brandy tells Mr. Whiskers to read something because he has too much time on his hands, she inadvertently leaves her diary out in the open, which Mr. Whiskers reads because of her suggestion. After a while this starts to devolve into him reading everyone else's diaries. In the end, Whiskers gets punished for violating his friends' privacy by being weaved into a spider-web, paralyzed by said spider's venom, dragged around, and weaved into a web again connected to his and Brandy's treehouse for the duration of the night.
9b	9b	"Less Than Hero"	Brandon Sawyer	Tina Kügler	September 25, 2004	109b
Brandy is holding a food drive for the less fortunate, and Mr. Whiskers wants to help out; he ends up accidentally ruining it and getting kicked out. Whilst wallowing in self-pity, a superhero comic book blows in his face, leading Whiskers to become a superhero by the aliases of "Captain Fruity" but after everybody claims that he is a menace, he decides to become a supervillain.
10a	10a	"Flim Flam Fever"	Jim Peronto	Chuck Klein	October 2, 2004	110a
After Brandy realizes how difficult it is to wash clothes in the jungle, she sees Lola coughing. Brandy formulates a plan to pretend she is sick so she will receive such special treatment as well. Whiskers reads up on the "disease" that Brandy has, and tries to find a cure, which gets everybody but Brandy sick. She then has to cater to everybody's needs.
10b	10b	"Private Antics, Major Problems"	Scott Peterson	Zac Moncrief	October 2, 2004	110b
When Brandy and Mr. Whiskers try to eat the tastiest fruit in the jungle, Brandy finds out that the fruit tastes like dirty socks and only Whiskers likes it. As Brandy marches off in frustration, she kicks down an ant hill, leaving it exposed to anteaters who attack the hill on a regular basis. They then have to join the ant army.
11a	11a	"The Curse of the Vampire Bat"	Brian Swenlin	Tina Kügler	October 29, 2004	115a
When Brandy and Mr. Whiskers go to meet a new neighbor, a vampire bat named Vlad (Tom Kenny); Mr. Whiskers becomes scared because he believes that the creature is a vampire, despite the fact that nobody believes that Mr. Whiskers is correct.
11b	11b	"The Monkey's Paw"	Jan Strnad	Rossen Varbanov	October 29, 2004	115b
While enjoying themselves at the river, Mr. Whiskers inadvertently crashes into Ed after Ed crashes into a log, which causes Mr. Whiskers to fly into a Mayan temple. Inside, they discover an ancient monkey's paw that grants wishes. Brandy, in frustration, wishes that she never knew Whiskers. She then forgets who Whiskers is. Note: This episode is based on the short story "The Monkey's Paw" by W. W. Jacobs.
12a	12a	"A Tree Huggin' Bunny"	Andrew Gottlieb	Carson Kugler	December 3, 2004	112a
Brandy and Mr. Whiskers stumble across an old tree, which Brandy is of a rare kind that is capable of building a vessel capable of getting her back to Florida. The only problem: Mr. Whiskers becomes obsessed with protecting it.
12b	12b	"The Big Game"	Susan Sherman	Shawn Björklund & Antoine Guilbaud	December 3, 2004	112b
Brandy prepares for a big coco ball match against Gaspar Le Gecko's team, which is the best in the jungle. However, despite her attempts to train the team, Ed the Otter keeps messing up and causes the team trouble. Brandy gets rid of Ed, but Gaspar has Ed for his team, and ends up winning the game on account of Ed's slip.
13	13	"On Whiskers, on Lola, on Cheryl and Meryl"	Russell Marcus	Zac Moncrief & Chuck Klein	December 17, 2004	116
Brandy realizes that it's getting close to Christmas, so in an attempt to try to get back home, she spreads the word of Christmas to the Amazon, as she thinks Santa (Stephen Root) would have no choice but to come if people are looking forward to it. Unfortunately for her, Santa has her on the Naughty List for being cruel to Whiskers, giving her a piece of coal for her misdeeds. In her anger, she throws the coal at his reindeer (specifically Rudolph), causing him to crash. As a result, she, Whiskers, Lola, Cheryl, Meryl, and Ed take on his role to save the holidays. Note: This episode is the only double-length special of the series, running for 22 minutes instead of the standard 10-11.
14a	14a	"Pedigree, Schmedigree"	Christopher Simmons	Zac Moncrief	January 28, 2005	113a
Brandy's life is shattered when her adoption papers state she's not a pedigree but a mixed breed or, in her case, a "common mutt". She drops into a rut, filled with depression and lack of proper grooming, and it's up to Whiskers to bring her back before the big beauty pageant. He does so, and Brandy wins the Pageant.
14b	14b	"The Howler Bunny"	Steve Freeman	Chuck Klein	January 28, 2005	113b
Mr. Whiskers leaves the treehouse after Brandy kicks him out, because of his sloppy behavior and becomes a son to a couple of Howler monkeys (Fred Willard and Tara Strong). Meanwhile, Brandy finds a new roommate, but realizes that she misses Mr. Whiskers so she rescues him from the Howler monkeys and the two make up for what they did as they return to the treehouse.
15a	15a	"Bad Hare Day"	Pamela Eells O'Connell	Celia Kendrick	February 4, 2005	114a
When Brandy has a red scarf and she wants to wear it to meet her friend's parents and tells Whiskers not to touch it (Or risk getting fed to the lions) Mr. Whiskers takes it without Brandy knowing and he messes it up when it goes into a volcano. Ed has an idea to weave a new scarf out of Whisker's fur, so they use bugs to shave it off (in the process he has to take off his jumpsuit), and a special formula to regrow his fur, however his fur keeps on growing longer and longer so he tries to fool Brandy into thinking it's growing strangely because he's old.
15b	15b	"Paw and Order"	John Behnke & Rob Humphrey	Fred Gonzales	February 4, 2005	114b
Someone in the jungle is stealing animals' possessions and everyone blames it on Brandy. Whiskers tries to clear her name.
16a	16a	"One of a Kind"	Earl Kress	Fred Gonzales	March 11, 2005	111a
A dog from Texas named Tiffany comes to the Amazon Jungle and becomes friends with Brandy. Whiskers tries to become friends with the two, but they reject him, leading him to build a poorly-constructed robot that quickly goes out of control.
16b	16b	"Believe in the Bunny"	Valerie Ahern & Christian McLaughlin	Celia Kendrick	March 11, 2005	111b
Brandy doesn't believe in the Easter Bunny and Mr. Whiskers tries to make her believe.
17a	17a	"Bad Brandy"	Brandon Sawyer	Fred Gonzales	April 29, 2005	119a
Brandy is jealous of Mr. Whiskers because he is a better leaf boarder than she is.
17b	17b	"Two Heads are Not Better Than One"	Kevin Campbell	Celia Kendrick	April 29, 2005	119b
Mr. Whiskers walks into a swamp and comes out with two heads (Jeff Bennett), one being himself, and the other intelligent, a bit snooty, and speaking with the accent of a high-class British gentleman.
18a	18a	"Trouble in Store"	Ken Koonce & Michael Merton	Shawn Björklund & Antoine Guilbaud	May 20, 2005	120a
Mr. Whiskers gets tricked by buying goods with Gaspar's Gold Card (a parody of MasterCard).
18b	18b	"Payback"	Bill Motz & Bob Roth	Carson Kugler	May 20, 2005	120b
Brandy saves Whisker's life, causing him to cater to her every whim.
19a	19a	"Mini Whiskers"	Katherine Green	Rossen Varbanov	July 2, 2005	118a
Brandy and Mr. Whiskers have a picnic and encounter a baby peccary in the bushes. Brandy trusts Whiskers to take care of him, but the baby seems to copy every thing Mr. Whiskers does and causes the baby to behave more immature and rude.
19b	19b	"Radio Free Bunny"	David Warick & Amy Debartolomeis	Tina Kügler	July 2, 2005	118b
Mr. Whiskers swallows a meteor, which causes him to sound like a radio. Everyone uses him for aerobics, exercise, entertainment and other things. He gets tired of people grabbing him and using him, so Brandy helps him.
20a	20a	"The Show Must Go Wrong"	Nina Bargiel & Jeremy Bargiel	Carson Kugler	July 22, 2005	117a
After finding a suitcase of video equipment Brandy decides to make a video to send down the stream to help her get rescued. She and the rest of the jungle reenact the story of how she got stranded but find it too boring so Brandy ends up embellishing it.
20b	20b	"Whiskers the Great"	Brandon Sawyer	Shawn Björklund & Antoine Guilbaud	July 22, 2005	117b
By pulling out the "Root of Power", Whiskers becomes the new Grouter and is worshiped by a pack of Rodents. He believes that the root is what helps him accomplish everything he does in life and that he's nothing without it. Brandy thinks otherwise.
21a	21a	"Freaky Tuesday"	Bill Motz & Bob Roth	Tina Kügler	August 12, 2005	121a
Brandy and Whiskers see a relationship therapist, Whiskers takes an exercise too far and pretends that he's Brandy, and vice-versa. Everybody believes this, except Brandy.
21b	21b	"The Brain of My Existence"	Russell Marcus	Rossen Varbanov	August 12, 2005	121b
Mr. Whiskers' brain leaves his head to fulfill its own dreams.

=== Season 2 (2006) ===
No. overall	No. in season	Title	Directed by	Written by	Storyboard by	Original release date	Prod. code
22a	1a	"Get a Job"	Steve Loter & John McIntyre	Bill Motz & Bob Roth	Luke Cormican	February 3, 2006	201a
Brandy and Whiskers get jobs at the Amazon Mall but Whiskers is the one that's doing all the work while Brandy just goofs off.
22b	1b	"Jungle Makeover"	Timothy Björklund	Eddie Guzelian	Celia Kendrick	February 3, 2006	201b
Brandy and Mr. Whiskers separate the treehouse into two sides because Whiskers is driving her nuts. He then wins a house make-over and throws a big party and keeping Brandy away from it, but when Brandy finally gets accepted she takes a bad step and ends up destroying the huge mansion.
23a	2a	"Pop Goes the Jungle"	Timothy Björklund	Jim Peronto	Fred Gonzales	February 10, 2006	202a
Brandy enters a karaoke contest, but has a scratchy singing voice however the leaders of the contest seem to love it.
23b	2b	"Wolfie: Prince of the Jungle"	Steve Loter & John McIntyre	Brandon Sawyer	Bobby London	February 10, 2006	202b
Whiskers tries to teach Wolfie manners so he won't mess up his date with Brandy.
24a	3a	"The Tell-Tale Shoes"	John McIntyre	Alicia Sky Varinaitis	Debra Pugh	February 17, 2006	203a
Brandy steals a pair of expensive Bugley's shoes, but feels guilt for stealing them. (The title and the story are from Edgar Allan Poe's "The Tell-Tale Heart")
24b	3b	"Time for Waffles"	Timothy Björklund & John McIntyre	Russell Marcus	Rossen Varbanov	February 17, 2006	203b
Dental hygiene sweeps the Jungle as Brandy buys white strips.
25a	4a	"Any Club That Would Have Me as a Member"	Timothy Björklund & John McIntyre	Bradley Zwieg	Tom Bertino	February 24, 2006	204a
Mr. Whiskers joins a gang of tough meat-eaters that want to sink their teeth into Brandy.
25b	4b	"Where Everybody Knows Your Shame"	John McIntyre	Matthew Wilson	Fred Osmond	February 24, 2006	204b
Brandy's hair job goes wrong; after trying to turn her bad blue color back to blonde the mixture turns into a frizzy green mess. This causes her to become the most mocked person in the jungle.
26a	5a	"Better Off Wet"	Timothy Björklund	Tiffany Zehnal	Carson Kugler	March 3, 2006	205a
Brandy and Mr. Whiskers train to be lifeguards but the job reveals that Brandy can't swim.
26b	5b	"Loathe Triangle"	Steve Loter & John McIntyre	Brian Swenlin	Katie Rice	March 3, 2006	205b
Whiskers and Ed fight over Margo.
27a	6a	"Pet Peeves"	John McIntyre	Christian Guevarra	Luke Cormican	March 10, 2006	206a
Whiskers finds a new pet, then promptly loses it so Brandy gives him a little assistance.
27b	6b	"What Price Dignity?! (Cheap!)"	Timothy Björklund & John McIntyre	Matthew Negrete	Celia Weiss	March 10, 2006	206b
Gaspar offers Brandy a dress in exchange for being his girlfriend while his mother comes to visit but it reveals that Gaspar's mother is a fraud and made the whole thing up to go out with Brandy this makes her explode so bad that she starts chasing Gaspar even when Whiskers figures he can solve it.
28a	7a	"You've Got Snail"	Timothy Björklund & John McIntyre	Jan Strnad	Fred Gonzales	March 17, 2006	207a
An annoying snail moves in under Brandy and Whiskers, claiming he was there the entire time they were. Whiskers' ball bounces into the snail's home, and the snail refuses to give it back.
28b	7b	"The Magic Hour"	John McIntyre	Eddie Guzelian	Chris Headrick & Brett Varon	March 17, 2006	207b
Whiskers is revealed to have been a magician's rabbit, and Gaspar has found some magical socks which he starts using to threaten everyone in the jungle into doing what he wants. Whiskers then challenges Gaspar to a magic-off.
29a	8a	"Net of Lies"	John McIntyre	Wendy Hunter	Debra Pugh	March 24, 2006	208a
Brandy breaks her promise to go with Whiskers and help kids collect fireflies, and decides to go a Sugartoad concert.
29b	8b	"Dog Play Afternoon"	Timothy Björklund & John McIntyre	Chris Bowman	Rossen Varbanov	March 24, 2006	208b
Brandy auditions for a play, but her audition becomes ruined because Margo puts celtzer in her drink, which causes her to burp in between lines. She exacts revenge against her by teaming up with Gaspar, who, unbeknownst to Brandy, is Whiskers' understudy.
30a	9a	"Auntie Dote"	Timothy Björklund & John McIntyre	Steve Freeman	Tom Bertino	March 31, 2006	209a
Brandy and Mr. Whiskers throw a party and the house is now a mess. So they call a professional cleaner called Auntie Dote.
30b	9b	"Curses!"	John McIntyre	Randi Barnes	Fred Osmond	March 31, 2006	209b
Brandy accidentally purchases a cursed amulet but Whiskers actually loves it.
31a	10a	"Con Hare"	John McIntyre	Nick Stanton & Devin Bunje	Katie Rice	April 7, 2006	210a
Gaspar cons Whiskers out of a Sugartoad poster for Meteor insurance, only Whiskers starts to regret the trade and tries to get it back. But which item does he need most?
31b	10b	"Rain Delay"	Timothy Björklund & John McIntyre	Mike Berman	Carson Kugler	April 7, 2006	210b
Brandy plans a samba lesson with an admirer named Tito but can't get there because of the severe weather however Whiskers gives her a message from Tito saying that he had to cancel their lesson be he had to visit his mother Brandy is disgusted that Whiskers made her go all the way out there for nothing and then starts to nab him.
32a	11a	"Sandy & Mr. Frisky"	Timothy Björklund & John McIntyre	Jim Peterson	Celia Weiss	April 14, 2006	211a
Brandy and Whiskers meet their perfect counterparts, Sandy & Mr. Frisky.
32b	11b	"Thinking Outside the Fruit"	John McIntyre	Russell Marcus	Luke Cormican	April 14, 2006	211b
Gaspar and Brandy make a bet that Whiskers can build a fruit car and can come back in 24 hours.
33a	12a	"Go! Fight! Win!"	Timothy Björklund & John McIntyre	Alicia Sky Varinaitis	Fred Gonzales	April 21, 2006	212a
Brandy and Whiskers audition to be cheerleaders.
33b	12b	"Class Dismissed"	John McIntyre	Michael Merton	Chris Headrick	April 21, 2006	212b
Brandy wants to sign up for self-defense classes to protect herself and meet cute guys. Whiskers signs them up for every class except self-defense.
34a	13a	"Itty Bitty Kitty"	Timothy Björklund & John McIntyre	Jim Peterson	Celia Weiss	April 28, 2006	213a
Whiskers finds an old toy that belonged to Brandy.
34b	13b	"Brandy's Best Ever Boyfriend"	John McIntyre	Katherine Butler	Gabe Swarr	April 28, 2006	213b
Brandy lies about having a rock-star boyfriend to go with her to Love-fest and has to pick up one quick.
35a	14a	"Stress Test"	John McIntyre	Nick Stanton & Devin Bunje	Fred Osmond	May 5, 2006	214a
Whiskers tries to solve Brandy's stress problem, but only makes matters worse.
35b	14b	"A Little Problem"	Timothy Björklund & John McIntyre	Chris Bowman	Tom Bertino	May 5, 2006	214b
Whiskers and Gaspar are too short to ride a rollercoaster, so they try to sneak in. They try everything but nothing works, so as a last resort, they start a size revolution.
36a	15a	"A Really Crushing Crush"	John McIntyre	Tracy Berna	Katie Rice	May 12, 2006	215a
Ed and Lola have a crush on each other, so Brandy tries to make the relationship perfect, while Whiskers tries to sabotage the whole thing.
36b	15b	"Pickled Tink"	Timothy Björklund & John McIntyre	John Behnke & Rob Humphrey	Carson Kugler	May 12, 2006	215b
Brandy hypnotizes Whiskers with a pinwheel, and he instantly begins cleaning whenever he hears the word pickle. Unfortunately, everybody in the jungle starts saying pickle.
37a	16a	"The Monster in My Skin"	Timothy Björklund & John McIntyre	Brandon Sawyer	Celia Weiss	June 17, 2006	216a
While playing with Brandy's make-up, Whiskers gets a pimple and thinks he will turn into a monster.
37b	16b	"Dollars & Senseless Violence"	John McIntyre	Gloria Ketterer	Luke Cormican	June 17, 2006	216b
When Mr. Whiskers finds a bag of shiny rocks, he and Brandy argue over what they should do with it.
38a	17a	"Big Girls Don't Body Slam"	John McIntyre	Jorge R. Gutiérrez & Jon M. Gibson	Chris Headrick	July 21, 2006	217a
When Whiskers decides to join Gaspar’s wrestling league, he makes Brandy his tag team partner.
38b	17b	"I Am Rainfo"	Timothy Björklund & John McIntyre	Brian Swenlin	Fred Gonzales	July 21, 2006	217b
Whiskers finds a book called "I Am Rainfo" and is constantly reading it. However, the cover is broken and it really is "In the Amazon Rainforest". Whiskers, trying to figure out what it is, learns that it is his home along with Brandy's. However, the sheer creepy creatures in the jungle causes him to live on a raft.
39a	18a	"The Tortoise and the Harebrain"	Timothy Björklund & John McIntyre	Bob Burris & Michael Ware	Chuck Klein	August 25, 2006	218a
After being mocked by tortoises, Whiskers decides it's high-time to challenge one tortoise to a match to settle the tortoise and the hare story once and for all.
39b	18b	"Rip Van Whiskers"	Timothy Björklund & John McIntyre	Lenny Ripps	Rossen Varbanov	August 25, 2006	218b
After Whiskers thinks he's been bitten by a poisonous frog that make its victims sleep for 50 years, he decides to make his last moments count before he goes into a half-century-long deep sleep. However, the ending reveals that he was never actually poisoned after all.
