= Arunee Nanthiwat =

Thai voice actress (1956–2025)

Arunee Nantiwat
- อรุณี นันทิวาส
- Born: 21 June 1956; Nong Chok, Phra Nakhon, Thailand
- Died: 4 December 2025 (aged 69)
- Occupation: Voice actress
- Years active: 1982–2021, 2022–2025
- Known for: Thai voice of Conan Edogawa, Suneo

Arunee Nanthiwat (Thai: อรุณี นันทิวาส; RTGS: Aruni Nanthiwat; 21 June 1956 – 4 December 2025) was a Thai voice actress who worked for Channel 9, TIGA, and Dream Express (DEX).

== Career ==
Arunee's major roles included Suneo Honekawa in Doraemon, Conan Edogawa and Sonoko Suzuki in Detective Conan from 1999–2021, and Nico Robin and Tony Tony Chopper in One Piece. She won the TV Gold Award in 1995 for Best Actress for the role of Hagemaru Hageda in Tsurupika Hagemaru.

On 28 August 2021, Arunee announced her indefinite hiatus from her voice acting career as the COVID-19 pandemic hit Thailand and her works were cancelled due to quarantine rules. In August 2022, she returned to voice acting by dubbing One Piece Film: Red and Doraemon: Nobita's Little Star Wars 2021. Although she terminated her work for television anime series, she still dubbed for Doraemon.

== Death ==
Nanthiwat died on 4 December 2025, at the age of 69.

== Filmography ==
=== Dubbing ===
==== Anime ====
- GeGeGe no Kitarō – Kitaro
- Mazinger Z – Baron Ashura, Shiro Kabuto, Kikunosuke
- Doraemon (Rose dub) – Suneo Honekawa, Jaiko Goda
- Doraemon (Video square dub) – Doraemon, Tamako Nobi
- Dr. Slump – Akane Kimidori, Peasuke Soramame
- Gu Gu Ganmo – Hanpeita Tsukuda
- Dragon Ball (Channel 9 dub) – Chi-Chi, Puar, Yajirobe
- Dragon Ball – Son Goku (Child)
- Saint Seiya – Ophiuchus Shaina, Kiki, Chameleon June
- City Hunter – Saeko Nogami, Reika Nogami
- Tsurupika Hagemaru – Hagemaru Hageda
- Anpanman – Currypanman, Ebi Donman
- Ranma ½ – Ranma Saotome (Female)
- Dragon Ball Z – Android 18, Chi-Chi, Dende
- Nadia: The Secret of Blue Water – Grandis Granva
- Pygmalio – Medusa
- The Brave Fighter of Legend Da-Garn – Seiji Takasugi
- Sailor Moon – Rei Hino (Sailor Mars), Makoto Kino (Sailor Jupiter), Sailor Star Fighter
- YuYu Hakusho – Botan, Shizuru Kuwabara, Mukuro
- Crayon Shin-chan – Shin Nohara, Keiko Honda, Ume Matsuzaka, Tsuru Nohara, Moeko Sakurada
- Papuwa – Papuwa
- Yaiba – Yaiba Kurogane, Kaguya (ep.34-38)
- Ghost Sweeper Mikami – Reiko Mikami
- Magic Knight Rayearth – Umi Ryuuzaki
- Neon Genesis Evangelion – Asuka Langley Soryu, Ritsuko Akagi
- Mobile Suit Gundam Wing (Channel 9 dub) – Lucrezia Noin, Dorothy Catalonia
- Mobile Suit Gundam Wing – Duo Maxwell, Dorothy Catalonia
- Detective Conan – Conan Edogawa, Sonoko Suzuki, Eri Kisaki, Naeko Miike, Rena Mizunashi, Vermouth, Momiji Ooka
- Bakusō Kyōdai Let's & Go!! – Go Seiba
- Mobile Suit Gundam: The 08th MS Team – Karen Joshua
- After War Gundam X – Garrod Ran, Toniya Malme
- You're Under Arrest – Natsumi Tsujimoto
- The King of Braves GaoGaiGar – Mamoru Amami, Swan White
- Pokémon – Hanako, Junsar, Haruka, Iris, Some Pokémon sounds
- Revolutionary Girl Utena – Juri Arisugawa, Nanami Kiryuu
- Flame of Recca – Fūko Kirisawa, Saicho, Kagerō (voice; replaced original voice actor)
- Bakusō Kyōdai Let's & Go!! MAX – Gouki Ichimonji
- Cardcaptor Sakura – Syaoran Li, Cerberus, Eriol Hiiragizawa
- Cyborg Kuro-chan – Mi, The Crows, Some of cats
- Digimon Adventure – Tai Kamiya, Palmon, Togemon, Lillymon
- One Piece – Tony Tony Chopper, Nico Robin
- Ojamajo Doremi – Hazuki Fujiwara, Hana, Majo Rika
- Hunter × Hunter – Gon Freecss
- Great Teacher Onizuka – Ryoko Sakurai, Urumi Kanzaki
- Digimon Adventure 02 – Yolei Inoue, V-mon
- Shin Megami Tensei: Devil Children – Cool
- Inuyasha – Sango, Shippō
- Yu-Gi-Oh! Duel Monsters – Mai Kujaku
- Sakura Wars – Li Kohran, Maria Tachibana
- Digimon Tamers – Takato Matsuki, Dukemon
- Bakuten Shoot Beyblade – Kai Hiwatari, Oliver Boulanger
- Fruits Basket – Kagura Sohma, Uotani Arisa
- Shaman King – Usui Horokeu, Tao Ren, Tao Jun, Asakura Hao
- Hikaru no Go – Yoshitaka Waya
- Digimon Frontier - Takuya Kanbara
- The Prince of Tennis – Sakuno Ryuzaki
- Saiyuki – Son Goku
- Mobile Suit Gundam SEED – Natarle Badgiruel, Flay Allster
- Tokyo Mew Mew – Zakuro Fujiwara
- Mirmo! – Rirumu
- MegaMan NT Warrior – Roll, Yai Ayanokoji, Princess Pride, Aki-chan
- Azumanga Daioh – Takino Tomo, Kurosawa Minamo
- Full Metal Panic! – Melissa Mao
- Love Hina – Motoko Aoyama, Haruka Urashima
- Kinnikuman Nisei – Meat Alexandria, Keiko
- Zatch Bell! – Gash Bell, Zofis
- Detective School Q – Narusawa Kazuma
- Fullmetal Alchemist – Riza Hawkeye, Pinako Rockbell, Rose Thomas, Sheska, Izumi Curtis, Envy
- Godannar – Lou Roux
- The Mythical Detective Loki Ragnarok – Reiya Ohshima
- Pretty Cure – Mipple, Kujou Hikari
- Mobile Suit Gundam SEED Destiny – Talia Gladys, Lunamaria Hawke, Erica Simmons, Hilda Harken, Mayu Asuka
- Fafner in the Azure – Shouko Hazama, Canon Memphis
- Kannazuki no Miko – Sister Miyako, Makoto Saotome, Sōma Ōgami (Child)
- My-HiME – Natsuki Kuga, Alyssa Searrs, Nagi Homura
- Sgt. Frog – Sergeant Keroro (ep. 1 to 205)
- Tenjho Tenge – Emi Isuzuม Chiaki Konoike
- School Rumble – Takano Akira
- Burst Angel – Jo, Amy
- Magical Girl Lyrical Nanoha – Yūno Scrya
- Glass Mask – Ayumi Himekawa
- My-Otome – Nina Wáng, Natsuki Kruger, Nagi Dài Artai
- Eureka Seven – Talho Yūki
- Negima! Magister Negi Magi – Konoka Konoe, Evangeline A.K. McDowell
- Yakitate!! Japan – Shigeru Kanmuri, Mizuno Azusagawa, Sophie Balzac Kirisaki
- Tsubasa Chronicle – Syaoran
- Moeyo Ken – Okita Kaoru, Nekomaru
- Itsudatte My Santa! – Sharry
- Oh My Goddess! – Urd
- Digimon Data Squad – Miki Kurosaki, Daimon Chika, Toma's grandmother, Gotsumon, Gaomon, Yukidarumon, Dukemon, Yggdrasil
- PreCure Splash Star – Mai's mother, Kiryuu Kaoru, Choppy, Princess Filia
- Shōnen Onmyōji – Mokkun
- Code Geass – Kallen Stadtfeld, Cornelia li Britannia, Lelouch Lamperouge (Child), Rolo, Marianne vi Britannia, Sayoko Shinozaki, Milly Ashford
- Ouran High School Host Club – Mitsukuni Haninozuka
- xxxHolic – Himawari Kunogi
- Gintama – Tae Shimura, Otose, Ayame Sarutobi
- Nana – Nana
- Fate/stay night – Rin Tōsaka, Caster, Mitsuzuri Ayako
- Reborn! (Cartoon Club) – Tsuna Sawada
- Mobile Suit Gundam 00 – Sumeragi Lee Noriega, Louise Halevy, Nena Trinity
- Bakugan Battle Brawlers – Daniel "Dan" Kuso, Wavern
- Powerpuff Girls Z – Kaoru Matsubara
- Blue Dragon – Zora
- Gurren Lagann – Nia Teppelin
- Yes! PreCure 5 – Natsuki Rin, Syrup
- Battle Spirits: Shōnen Toppa Bashin – Bashin Toppa
- Inazuma Eleven – Kino Aki, Kurimatsu Teppei, Sakuma Jirou, Tachimukai Yuuki, Urabe Rika, Endou Mamoru (voice; replaced original voice actor)
- Toradora! – Taiga Aisaka
- Yes! PreCure 5 GoGo! – Natsuki Rin, Syrup
- Fairy Tail – Erza Scarlet, Cana Alberona, Karen Lilica, Aquarius, Levy McGarden, Romeo Conbolt, Bisca, Natsu Dragneel (Child), Shimon (Child)
- Fullmetal Alchemist: Brotherhood – Riza Hawkeye, Pinako Rockbell, Rose Thomas, Sheska, Olivier Mira Armstrong, Izumi Curtis, Envy
- Mazinger Edition Z: The Impact! – Baron Ashura, Shiro Kabuto, Kikunosuke
- Eden of the East – Mic-chon, Shiratori Diana Kuroha
- Fresh Pretty Cure! – Higashi Setsuna
- Battle Spirits: Shōnen Gekiha Dan – Mai Viole, Kenzo Hyoudo
- Digimon Fusion – Kudou Taiki
- High School of the Dead – Saeko Busujima, Rika Minami, Yuriko Takagi
- HeartCatch PreCure! – Myoudouin Itsuki, Dark Pretty Cure
- Puella Magi Madoka Magica – Sayaka Miki, Kyubey
- Toriko – Tina, Setsuno
- Cardfight!! Vanguard – Misaki Tokura, Kamui Katsuragi, Tobita Mai
- Mobile Suit Gundam AGE – Flit Asuno (Child)
- Tiger & Bunny – Agnes Joubert
- Transformers: Prime – Rafael Esquivel, June Darby
- Girls und Panzer – Ami Chōno, Mako Reizei
- Love Live! School Idol Project – Sonoda Umi
- Gundam Build Fighters – Kirara
- Sailor Moon Crystal – Sailor Mars, Chibiusa, Queen Beryl, Black Lady
- Mobile Suit Gundam: Iron-Blooded Orphans – Kudelia Aina Bernstein

==== American animated ====
- My Little Pony: Friendship Is Magic – Rainbow Dash, Sweetie Belle

==== Tokusatsu ====
- Chōjin Sentai Jetman – Aya Odagiri, Ako Hayasaka / Blue Swallow, Rie Aoi / Maria
- Chikyu Sentai Fiveman – Remi Hoshikawa / Five Yellow
- Kyōryū Sentai Zyuranger – Boy / Tiger Ranger, Bandora
- Gosei Sentai Dairanger – Gara, Kujaku, Kou's Mother, Kameo
- Chouriki Sentai Ohranger – Juri Nijō / Oh Yellow
- Gekisou Sentai Carranger – Natsumi Shinohara / Yellow Racer, Dapp, Zonnette
- Denji Sentai Megaranger – Chisato Jogasaki / Mega Yellow, Shiboreena
- Seijuu Sentai Gingaman – Hismine
- GoGo Sentai Boukenger – Natsuki Mamiya / Bouken Yellow
- Juken Sentai Gekiranger – Lao Fan, Miranda
- Engine Sentai Go-onger – Saki Rōyama / Go-on Yellow, Engine Toripter, Kegalesia
- Samurai Sentai Shinkenger – Mako Shiraishi / Shinken Pink
- Tensou Sentai Goseiger – Moune / Gosei Yellow, Datas, Rachere
- Kamen Rider Kuuga – Hikari Enokida, Minori Godai, Nozomi Sasayama
- Kamen Rider Agito – Sumiko Ozawa, Taichi Misugi, Manami Katahira
- Kamen Rider Ryuki – Yui Kanzaki, Nanako Shimada, Reiko Momoi
- Kamen Rider 555 – Yuka Osada / Crane Orphnoch
- Kamen Rider Hibiki – Kasumi Tachibana
- Kamen Rider Kabuto – Juka Tendo
- Kamen Rider Den-O – Hana / Kohana
- Kamen Rider Kiva – Ramon / Basshaa, Megumi Aso, Maya
- Kamen Rider Decade – Kivat-bat the 3rd / Kivara
- Kamen Rider W – Akiko Narumi, Wakana Sonozaki / ClayDoll Dopant, Shroud, Philip (Young)
- Kamen Rider OOO – Chiyoko Shiraishi, Mezool
- Kamen Rider Fourze – Yuki Jojima, Misaki Nadeshiko / Kamen Rider Nadeshiko
- Kamen Rider Wizard – Medusa
- Kamen Rider Gaim – Yoko Minato / Kamen Rider Marika
- Kamen Rider Ghost – Akari Tsukimura
- Kamen Rider Ex-Aid – Nico Saiba
- Ultraman Taro – Izumi Moriyama
- Ultraman Gaia – Atsuko Sasaki
- Ultraman Dyna – Mai Midorikawa
- Ultraman Max – Elly
- Ultraman Mebius – Konomi Amagai
- Ultra Galaxy Mega Monster Battle – Jun Haruna
- Ultraman Ginga – Chigusa Kuno, Arisa Sugita, Sakuya
- Ultraman X – Sayuri Tachibana, X Devizer
- K-tai Investigator 7 – Toko Asano, Akira Karasaki
- Magic Bullet Chronicles Ryukendo – Kaori Nose, Komachi Kurihara
- Tomica Hero: Rescue Fire – Tamami Sugiyama, Q-suke, Jokaen

==== Film ====
- Harry Potter and the Order of the Phoenix – Dolores Umbridge (Imelda Staunton)
- Harry Potter and the Deathly Hallows – Part 1 – Dolores Umbridge
- The Enchanting Phantom – Ghost Lord

==== Television program ====
- Sponge (Channel 9 dub)
- Mega Clever – Arisman

==== Game ====
- 12 Tails Online (2011) – Penguin, Cat
