= Tom Bertino =

American animator

Tom Bertino is a professional animator, formerly Animation Director and Visual Effects Supervisor at Industrial Light & Magic.

== Life ==
Tom attended Anthony Chabot elementary school in Oakland, California and was already known for his cartoons. He graduated from the California College of Arts and Crafts in 1981. Tom Bertino joined Industrial Light & Magic in 1986 as a Supervisor of the Rotoscope Department. Bertino later moved into the Animation Department. and contributed his talents to a number of feature films including: Star Wars, Terminator 2: Judgment Day, Death Becomes Her, The Abyss, The Mask, and Who Framed Roger Rabbit.

Beginning his professional animation career with Sally Cruikshank in 1978, Bertino has worked for Nepenthe, DiC, Hanna-Barbera and Colossal Pictures in a number of capacities including character design, storyboards, layouts, voices and sound effects.

In 1995, Bertino was nominated for an Academy Award for best achievement in visual effects and received a BAFTA nomination in the same category, for the groundbreaking computer graphics imagery he created in The Mask.

In 2005, Bertino left ILM and became the Director of the Graduate Department of the School of Animation at the Academy of Art University in San Francisco.

== Filmography ==
- Son of the Mask (2005) (animation supervisor: ILM)
- Men in Black II (2002) (animation supervisor)
- The Time Machine (2002) (animation supervisor: ILM)
- Star Wars: Episode I – The Phantom Menace (1999) (animation supervisor: ground battle, ILM)
- Flubber (1997) (visual effects supervisor)
- 101 Dalmatians (1996) (character animation supervisor: ILM)
- The Mask (1994) (animation supervisor)
- Death Becomes Her (1992) (rotoscope supervisor: ILM)
- Hook (1991) (rotoscope artist)
- Star Trek VI: The Undiscovered Country (1991) (rotoscope supervisor)
- Terminator 2: Judgment Day (1991) (rotoscoping supervisor: ILM)
- The Rocketeer (1991) (rotoscope supervisor)
- Backdraft (1991) (rotoscope artist: ILM)
- Switch (1991) (rotoscope supervisor)
- The Doors (1991) (rotoscope supervisor: ILM) (as Tom Vertino)
- Ghost (1990) (rotoscope supervisor: ILM)
- Back to the Future Part III (1990) (rotoscope supervisor)
- Joe Versus the Volcano (1990) (animation supervisor)
- The Hunt for Red October (1990) (rotoscoper: ILM)
- Back to the Future Part II (1989) (rotoscope supervisor: ILM)
- Ghostbusters II (1989) (animation supervisor: ILM)
- Indiana Jones and the Last Crusade (1989) (rotoscope artist)
- Cocoon: The Return (1988) (roto supervisor: ILM)
- Caddyshack II (1988) (rotoscoper: ILM)
- Willow (1988) (rotoscope supervisor: ILM)
- Innerspace (1987) (rotoscope technician: ILM)
- Howard the Duck (1986) (rotoscope: ILM visual effects unit)

=== Art Department - filmography ===
- Brandy & Mr. Whiskers (Storyboard artist)

=== Director - filmography ===
- Work In Progress (2000) ILM

=== Miscellaneous Crew - filmography ===
- The Plague Dogs (1982) (tracing)

=== Himself - filmography ===
"HBO First Look"

- Son of the Mask (2005) TV Episode (Himself)
- Cartoon Logic (2005) (V) (Himself)
- Return to Edge City (2005) (V) (Himself)
