= My-HiME (manga) =

Japanese manga series

- First tankōbon volume cover

舞-HiME (Mai Hime)
- Created by: Hajime Yatate
- Manga
- Written by: Noboru Kimura
- Illustrated by: Kenetsu Satō
- Published by: Akita Shoten
- English publisher: NA: Tokyopop
- Magazine: Weekly Shōnen Champion
- Original run: August 19, 2004 – July 7, 2005
- Volumes: 5
- Related works
- My-HiME; My-HiME EXA; My-Otome; My-Otome (manga)

My-HiME (舞-HiME, Mai Hime) is a Japanese manga series based on Sunrise's My-HiME series, it is following a storyline different from that of the anime. It is authored by Hajime Yatate (original creator), Noboru Kimura (scenario), and Kenetsu Satō (art). It was published for 44 chapters in Akita Shoten's shōnen manga magazine Weekly Shōnen Champion from 2004 to 2005. It was licensed for English released in North America by Tokyopop.

== Plot ==
The manga follows the story of Yuuichi Tate, a recent transfer student to Fuka Academy. At Fuka, he finds out that he is the Key - the person needed to unlock greater powers - to two HiMEs, Mai Tokiha and Natsuki Kuga. The manga covers Yuuichi's relationship with the two girls as well as their battle against an organization attempting to take the power of the HiME Star for themselves.

== Characters ==
The cast of characters is made up mostly of students and staff at Fuka Academy. Although most characters in the manga also appear in the anime series, they all differ slightly in their characteristics and relationships. In one example, Mikoto Minagi does not have any known family unlike the anime, but she still is attached to Mai. And unlike the anime, the general public are aware of the hime's existence or at least those attending Fuka Academy.

== Publication ==
The manga was serialized in Akita Shoten's shōnen manga magazine Weekly Shōnen Champion from August 19, 2004, to July 7, 2005. Akita Shoten collected its chapters in five tankōbon volumes, released from November 11, 2004, to September 8, 2005.

The manga was licensed for English release in North America by Tokyopop, who published the five volumes from November 2006 to July 2007.

=== Volume list ===
No.	Original release date	Original ISBN	English release date	English ISBN
1	November 11, 2004	4-253-20771-5	November 2006	978-1-59816-651-4
1. Boy Meets Girls; 2. I Hate It!; 3. This Ain't Logic!; 4. Long Night; 5. Be By My Side...; 6. Flaming Memories; 7. Student Council Enforcement Dept.; 8. Ori-HiME Squad
2	February 8, 2005	4-253-20772-3	March 2007	978-1-59816-652-1
9. Nao Yuki; 10. I Don't Know Anything; 11. Mikoto Minagi; 12. Expectation & Truth; 13. Akane Higurashi; 14. Koumokuten; 15. Mirror Wall; 16. Light of the Law; 17. 17 Years Old
3	March 8, 2005	4-253-20773-1	July 2007	978-1-59816-653-8
18. Life in the pits 19. Groping in the Dark; 20. Elegy of the Beasts; 21. No Way!!; 22. Que Sera, Sera; 23. Princess - Princess; 24. Knuckle Punch; 25. End & Beginning; 26. Princess Star
4	July 8, 2005	4-253-20774-X	July 2007	978-1-59816-853-2
27. Cultural Festival; 28. Family; 29. Izzak; 30. White Rabbit; 31. The Brother Dear Quiz; 32. Student Council President Suzushiro; 33. The Underground Ruins; 34. Key to the Future; 35. Mother and Daughter
5	September 8, 2005	4-253-20775-8	July 2007	978-1-59816-854-9
36. Queen; 37. The Obsidian Lord; 38. The Beginning of the End; 39. The Commencement of Battle; 40. Mai VS Natsuki; 41. Justice Doesn't Die; 42. Rematch of the Future; 43. The Sword; 44. Welcome to Fuuka Academy

== Reception ==
Jason Thompson of Manga: The Complete Guide has described the series as "cynical", as it mixes several genres. He has also criticized the artwork.
