= Brandy & Mr. Whiskers =

- Genre: Adventure comedy Slice of life
- Created by: Russell Marcus
- Directed by: Timothy Björklund; John McIntyre (season 2); Steve Loter (season 2)
- Voices of: Kaley Cuoco; Charlie Adler; Sherri Shepherd; Tom Kenny; Alanna Ubach; Jennifer Hale; André Sogliuzzo
- Theme music composer: Randy Petersen; Kevin Quinn; Tim Heintz
- Opening theme: Brandy & Mr. Whiskers, performed by Lou Bega
- Composers: Kevin Manthei; Kevin Riepl
- Country of origin: United States
- Original language: English
- No. of seasons: 2
- No. of episodes: 39 (77 segments) (list of episodes)

Production
- Executive producers: Russell Marcus; Timothy Björklund; Bill Motz; Bob Roth
- Producer: Natasha Kopp
- Editor: Philip Malamuth
- Running time: 22 minutes
- Production company: Walt Disney Television Animation

Original release
- Network: Disney Channel
- Release: August 21, 2004 – August 25, 2006

Brandy & Mr. Whiskers is an American 2D-animated comedy television series created by sitcom writer Russell Marcus for the Disney Channel. It follows the lives of the titular characters – respectively, a pampered-yet-spunky dog and a hyperactive rabbit – who get stuck in the Amazon rainforest together. The show originally aired from August 21, 2004, to August 25, 2006. Thirty-nine episodes were produced.

== Premise ==
A pampered dog (Brandy) and an easily excited rabbit (Mr. Whiskers) face a new life of challenges together when they fall out of an airplane and become stranded in the Amazon rainforest. They make new friends: Lola Boa, the boa constrictor; toucan sisters Cheryl and Meryl; and Ed the otter. Stories follow the titular duo as they attempt to adapt to their new surroundings.

== Episodes ==
Season	Segments	Episodes	Originally released	
Season	Segments	Episodes	First released	Last released
1	41	21	August 21, 2004	August 12, 2005
2	36	18	February 3, 2006	August 25, 2006

=== Season 1 (2004–2005) ===
Brandy and Mr. Whiskers start getting acquainted as they begin their new lives in the Rainforest. They build a treehouse to live in, using debris that fell out of the plane's cargo compartment. A big part of the series is Brandy's desperation to getting back to her home in Palm Beach, Florida. In the meantime, both she and Mr. Whiskers work together and build an unlikely but genuine friendship despite having a lot of differences, adapt by exploring the environment, and making friends with the native animals. Brandy makes attempts to get the jungle to become a civilized society by introducing elements such as fashion, hygiene, and shiny rocks, their type of currency. Mr. Whiskers prefers to mix things up by using the powers of invention and imagination to occupy his time, but it usually causes havoc in the jungle and affects his popularity.

=== Season 2 (2006) ===
As Brandy and Mr. Whiskers get more settled in the jungle, a lot of changes are put in order. They redecorate the treehouse by giving the interior a more "homey environment", which includes flowery wallpaper, tasteful decor and an indoor bathroom (this was after Mr. Whiskers' new "dream house" was destroyed). The native animals also become more anthropomorphic as they have now established a new market economy in the Amazon. Brandy and Mr. Whiskers discover the mall in the first episode of season 2, "Get a Job". They develop clothing, consumer products, restaurants, theme parks, TV commercials, a boy band called "Sugartoad" and a shopping mall. The adaptation has also lowered Brandy's desire to getting back home as she grows to truly accept her new life in the Amazon.

== Characters ==
=== Main ===
- Brandy Harrington (voiced by Kaley Cuoco) is a blonde-furred dog who was owned by an extremely wealthy couple and talks in a valley girl-accent. While on her way to a spa for the first time in an aircraft's cargo room, a mishap with Mr. Whiskers caused the two of them to fall straight into the Amazon Rainforest. After she callously trades him to Gaspar for a map back home, Brandy realizes that she cares for him deep down and rescues him. She prefers to make the most out of any situation, though she does attempt frequently to obtain security or improve her own standing by abusing the kindness of her friends, despite loving and caring for them a lot. She believes herself to be a spaniel with a pedigree, but in the episode "Pedigree, Schmedigree", it is revealed that she is a mongrel from a dog pound.
- Mr. Whiskers (voiced by Charlie Adler) is a white English Lop rabbit with an orange jumpsuit and a horrible case of body odor who has not had many friends during his lifetime. While he is generally portrayed as goofy, hyperactive, dimwitted, and destructive, special moments display that he is actually intelligent and possesses a fairly large vocabulary. He is also very loving and caring, but he can be clumsy and clueless at times. When he first met Brandy, he was on his way to a zoo in Paraguay where he was going to be sold for 39 cents, though he soon made a mistake that caused the two of them to fall into the Amazon Rainforest. While Brandy is often embarrassed and irritated by his antics, Whiskers does his best to help her out and he does cherish his friendship with her, though she does not always reciprocate. Mr. Whiskers' other best friend is Ed, a river otter with whom he often spends most of his time.

=== Recurring ===
- Lola Boa (voiced by Alanna Ubach) is, as her name suggests, a pink and purple-striped boa constrictor who often serves as the voice of reason amongst Brandy's friends. She speaks with a heavy Hispanic accent. While she often has great ideas, sometimes Brandy believes her ideas are not too bright and Brandy secretly believes Lola is gross because she swallows rodents whole while they are still alive. However, Lola remains Brandy's best friend and she is usually there to help her out when the going gets tough, though Brandy's vain and callous nature is sometimes too harsh for her to tolerate. A running gag with Lola is the fact that like a snake, she has no arms or legs. The others constantly make remarks about her lack of limbs, not seeming to notice until she acknowledges her "disability". In the episode "You've Got Snail", Lola's profession seems to be as a nurse.
- Cheryl and Meryl (both voiced by Sherri Shepherd) are two twin toucan sisters that have a permanent grudge against one another and are Brandy's closest friends next to Lola. While they care for one another, they often compete and bicker over petty matters, though they do agree with each other in certain rare circumstances. Cheryl and Meryl's fights often lead to catastrophes that divert the paths of the plans concocted by Mr. Whiskers and Brandy.
- Ed (voiced by Tom Kenny) is a giant otter who is Mr. Whiskers' best friend. He is kind and easygoing, but also dimwitted. Both Ed and Mr. Whiskers usually come up with schemes, but sometimes Ed is the one who does the thinking. Despite the fact that most of their plans cause havoc, he is steadfast and loyal to his friend.
- Gaspar Le'Gecko (voiced by André Sogliuzzo) is the manipulative, self-appointed dictator/entrepreneur/musical director of the Amazon Rainforest, serving as the main antagonist of the series. However, the only reason he is the leader is that no one else bothered to take the position. He speaks with a French accent, though he is assumed to be from the local area. He has a strong desire to eat Mr. Whiskers and often (unsuccessfully) schemes in order to gain an opportunity to do such. Gaspar is one of the few individuals in the Rainforest who has the ability to help Brandy get back home to civilization, though after Brandy betrayed him by going back on her deal in the first episode, he hasn't since offered to help her out again. Gaspar frequently partakes in using others to get what he wants or showing surface-level friendliness to suit his own personal interests. He also displays a more sensitive side that he usually keeps to himself, such as liking ballet and little dolls. He appears to be infatuated with Brandy. In the episode "What Price Dignity?! (Cheap!)", Gaspar tells Brandy that his mother is coming to visit and says that he will give her a beautiful dress if she pretends to be his girlfriend while his mother is there, but it turns out that Gaspar's mother is a fraud and the date was a sham.
- Margo (voiced by Jennifer Hale) is a walking stick who is rivals with Brandy in the social chain of the Amazon Rainforest. When Brandy first arrived in the Amazon, she helped her out by giving her some inside information on where the popular people hang out since she insists that Brandy shouldn't hang out with Mr. Whiskers. Despite the fact that Margo hangs out with Brandy and her friends in some instances, she is far from afraid of belittling her in order to improve her own social standing.
- The Monkeys (voiced by Tom Kenny and Jeff Bennett) are Gaspar's minions. They are not very intelligent and either mindlessly do whatever they're told or misunderstand what they are commanded.
  - Lester (voiced by Bob Rubin) is a gorilla-like monkey who is usually seen as one of Gaspar's henchmen. In one episode, he is portrayed as the bully of the rainforest who likes to beat up Mr. Whiskers.
- Whiskers' brain (voiced by Charlie Adler): He wears a bowler hat, speaks with a Yiddish accent and constantly leaves his owner's head. He is more like a running gag but has come up numerous times.
- Harold (voiced by Dee Bradley Baker) is a guinea pig who is shown in the second season as the pet of Mr. Whiskers.
- Mr. Sloth (voiced by André Sogliuzzo) is a three-toed sloth who often appears and almost never speaks.
- Gabriella (voiced by Kath Soucie and Grey DeLisle) is Gaspar's girlfriend. She is often seen accompanied by Margo and the Lemur. Gabriella is an upscale basilisk lizard who takes care of her appearance and fashion. She is an enemy of Brandy.
- The Lemur (voiced by Tara Strong) is a lemur that is always with Margo and Gabriella. The three constantly tease Brandy, but always get their comeuppance.

=== Supporting ===
- Melvin (voiced by A.J. Trauth) is a marsh deer. Brandy got the idea she could only get his attention by whitening her teeth. In reality, he did like her but only started talking to her when she started talking to him, though her smiling creeped him out. He confessed this when they were being chased by a jaguar and his son. Their pursuers were tracking them by their bright teeth.
- The Vic (voiced by Thomas Lennon) is an emerald tree boa. He was the target of Lola Boa's infatuation in "The Skin of Eeeeeeeevil!!!" In his second appearance, the Vic was the head of the jock-like Carnivore Club that Whiskers wanted to join. Unlike most of the other predators seen that chased after Brandy and Whiskers, the Vic and his two friends were not foiled but rather left hungry, feeling dejected that they were out-smarted by a plant eater. In "Pop Goes the Jungle" he is seen eating himself to stop hearing Brandy's horrible singing voice.
- Wolfie Lobito (voiced by Diedrich Bader) is a wolf who was raised by a monkey who was raised by a panther who was raised by a coconut tree. Whiskers eventually turned him into a gentleman, but by then he was helpless to do anything as he watched Brandy fall off a cliff and into the water. Brandy instantly had a crush on him after he saved her from a similar predicament before. She's seen him around before but never really had a chance to speak to him because she was too shy too. She was friends with him as well before but she had forgotten his name because they hadn't seen each other in a few years. She wanted to date him and kept saying that she was going to make him "the best boyfriend ever" but she never really went out with him. Wolfie's unmannered and impolite attitude got to Brandy so she started teaching him how to be a mannered wolf. Wolfie didn't really like this so Brandy let him choose if he wanted to continue taking lessons from her or just go off on his own. Wolfie quickly took to this idea.
- Mama Croc (voiced by Kerri Kenney) is an American crocodile who Brandy and Mr. Whiskers had to babysit her nine eggs, or else she would eat them.
- Tito (voiced by Néstor Carbonell) is a monkey who teaches samba lessons. In the episode Brandy fights against bad weather to reach Tito before Margo; eventually, she learns Tito canceled the lessons due to his sick mother.
- Mr. Cantarious (voiced by Wayne Knight) is a jungle snail who was discovered to be the underside neighbor of Brandy and Whiskers when Whiskers' ball rolled into his house and smacked into him. When Cantarious refused to give Whiskers' ball back, Brandy and Whiskers did acts of revenge to him, including filling his yard with candy wrappers and having a loud party at night. However, Cantarious got back each time by sliming them with his snail slime, usually somehow orally. The running gag was Brandy, Whiskers, and anyone else who suffered his wrath running to a river, washing their mouths as they go "Gross, gross, gross!" They eventually made peace, but only for a short time when Whiskers offered to lend him salt.
- Isabelle (voiced by Jennifer Hale) is a giant tegu lizard. Whiskers had a crush on her and did all sorts of weird things to impress her like acting gangsta. She has a very short temper and lives with her parents. Isabelle didn't like him back and ate him. Whiskers found a new crush inside her stomach and moved on after she threw them up.
- Dr. Phyllis (voiced by Hallie Todd) is a dugong who is a physician that helps people with their problems, especially Brandy and Whiskers' problems. She recommends Brandy to be like Mr. Whiskers, and Mr. Whiskers to be like Brandy, which by the way, ticked off Brandy. After Brandy turns the tables on Whiskers into going back to his normal self, they promised to Dr. Phyllis to never say THE blaming word ever again.
- Gina (voiced by Jennifer Hale) is an orange coati that Whiskers fell in love with.
- Tiffany Turlington (voiced by Amy Davidson) is very similar to appearance to Brandy and shares many interests with her. She has the same dog ears as Brandy's, but brown colored and curved. Tiffany claimed to be very rich and has claimed to visit many different places. Brandy, feeling the need to prove she's good friend material, lied to Tiffany about the places she'd been too when she really hadn't. While Brandy has a musical leash, she has one with a tracker bug. She dislikes Mr. Whiskers.
- "Poncho" (voiced by Grey DeLisle) is a baby boar who appeared out of a bush. Brandy and Whiskers take Poncho in, much to Whiskers complaining. At first, Brandy tries to find Poncho's parents. After failing to do so, she goes back to the treehouse. Later in the episode, Brandy teaches Whiskers about responsibility, and how others follow you as an example. Poncho is seen following whatever Whiskers does. Later, Poncho's parents find him, and take him home.
- Sandy Carington (voiced by Sara Rue) is a fashionable dog who looks just like Brandy, but with orange wavy ears, green eyes, a mellow yellow shirt, blue cardigan, a darker blue skirt, and blue sandals. Sandy fell into the rainforest with Mr. Frisky the same way Brandy and Mr. Whiskers fell into the rainforest. She does not blame Mr. Frisky for confusing the hatch for a light switch, whereas Brandy thinks of Mr. Whiskers as a peabrain for confusing the two. Sandy is a nicer, more caring version of Brandy. Not only is she kinder, but better at everything than Brandy. Even Brandy's friends and all the other locals like Sandy and Mr. Frisky more making their polar opposites jealous. Brandy and Mr. Whiskers try to sabotage Sandy and Mr. Frisky's party and when that does not work, they accidentally fling them out of the jungle. They are both rescued and given a TV show, making them celebrities.
- Mr. Frisky (voiced by Charlie Schlatter) is a rabbit who is the best friend of Sandy Carington. He is very active and shares some habits with Mr. Whiskers, but he is far more agile and less devastating than him.
- Vlad (voiced by Tom Kenny) is a bat. When Brandy and Mr. Whiskers go to meet a new neighbor, Mr. Whiskers becomes scared because he believes that the neighboring creature is a vampire, despite the fact that nobody believes that Mr. Whiskers is correct. Eventually, Vlad admits he is a vampire bat, but keeps it secret because he's annoyed with people thinking he is an actual vampire.

== Production ==
The series officially began development in 2002, and the team of writers that wrote for the show includes the show's creator Russell Marcus. During season 2, the crew of the show grew after many of the crew members of the then-recently canceled The Buzz on Maggie were hired.

== Availability ==
The episode "To the Moon, Whiskers" is available in Disney Channel Collection Volume 2 for Game Boy Advance Video, alongside episodes from Kim Possible and Lilo & Stitch: The Series. The first episode ("Mr. Whiskers' First Friend/The Babysitter's Flub") was also released in HD on the official Disney Channel Animation YouTube page on August 21, 2024 (for the series' 20th anniversary). The episode "One of a Kind/Believe in the Bunny" was also released on the channel on April 6, 2025.

== Accolades ==
Brandy & Mr. Whiskers won a Daytime Emmy Award for "individual achievement in animation" on May 15, 2005.
