= My-Otome (manga) =

Japanese manga series

舞-乙HiME (Mai-Otome)
- Manga
- Written by: Hiroyuki Yoshino; Tatsuhito Higuchi
- Illustrated by: Kenetsu Satō
- Published by: Akita Shoten
- Magazine: Weekly Shōnen Champion
- Original run: August 2005 – 2006
- Volumes: 5
- Related works
- My-HiME; My-HiME (manga); My-HiME EXA; My-Otome

My-Otome (舞-乙HiME, Mai-Otome) is the manga counterpart to Sunrise's My-Otome series, following a storyline that is different from that of the anime. It is authored by Hajime Yatate (original creator), Tatsuhito Higuchi (scenario), Hiroyuki Yoshino (scenario) and Kenetsu Satō (art). During its 44-chapter run, it was published in Akita Shoten's Shōnen Champion, with its first publication in August 2005, two months prior to the release of the anime.

It is a semi-fusion of the Mai-Hime anime and manga (e.g. Haruka's element, and Shizuru's knowledge of her own naginata-wielding 'dark twin' as well as Alyssa's sisterly relationship with Natsuki Kruger and the apparent romantic relationship between Viola and the latter). However it is unconnected to the new My-Otome Zwei manga, which follows the anime's plot more closely.

In addition, there is a derivative chapter called Mai Otome Super H, centered on an onsen visit. It was published in the Champion RED magazine. As the title suggests, it has hentai content. However, it is a canonical work by the original manga artist and the content is not as explicit as most H-Doujinshi. It takes place between chapters 12 and 13, but no mention is made in the main plot.

A continuation of the original manga was released and named My-Otome Arashi, which introduces Archduke Nagi's younger twin sister (disguised as a man) Arashi who has purchased Garderobe and all of its students after the campus incurred repair debts from the end of the original manga. During Sergay's coup turning the school into a nightclub even though Garderobe is the single most vital element to all the nations of Earl by supplying Otomes (they have supposedly been abandoned by the world).

== Story ==
One night, in the Windbloom Kingdom, Princess Mashiro Blan de Windbloom is assassinated in her sleep. Some days later, the main character, an anonymous boy, arrives in Wind City, capital of Windbloom. Using a gem passed down from his mother, he takes up the identity of Mashiro and joins Garderobe. The story follows his experiences in Garderobe and later his battles against those who would seek to destabilize the peace.

== Nomenclature ==
- Otome, officially 乙-type HiME - 乙-type Highly-advanced Materializing Equipment. A female virgin who serves as a bodyguard and servant to an important political figure, they have the power to materialize special robes and weapons known as Elements because of special nanomachines. As with Hime in My-HiME otome is a pun as in Japanese it can mean maiden or virgin which is appropriate since all Otome need to be virgins to retain their powers, as the nanomachines are destroyed upon contact with a chemical found in sperm.
- GEM - Generable (sic) Enigmatic Matrix, as explained in Chapters 1 and 2. The source of an Otome's power.
- Element - The weapon of an Otome, examples include Shizuru's whip like katana and Arika's blue crystal lance.
- SLAVE - A creature summoned by a contract using one's own blood. The life force of a SLAVE is connected to that of the summoner, meaning if the slave is killed the owner perishes along with it much like the Key and Child bond in My-HiME.
- REM - Reinforcing (sic) Enigmatic Matrix. A Schwarz-modified version of Garderobe's GEM. Used by Midori. It appears to allow the user access to their own Robe, as opposed to invisibly enhancing the user like the anime's does, although since Midori's is the only one seen, no generalization of its abilities can be made. Midori's REM allows her to draw on the power of her minions. Unlike the anime, Yohko does not eventually upgrade it to have infinite duration. Compatible with Garderobe's nanomachines, allowing Arika to briefly Materialize by using it in Chapters 36 and 37.
- MAID - Multi-purpose Assistant-type Independent Droid. A series of robots based on Miyu that are being developed in Aries. They are "perfect and flawless". No anime equivalent exists.
- Beautiful Power (Miryoku) - A form of energy that powers special attacks by the Otome. Some Otomes have special charge-up attacks such as Arika's 'Bolt from the Blue', Nao's 'Bloody Stripe Circus', and Natsuki's 'Howling Silver Wolf' but are much different from Miryoku. The special attacks an Otome use that are powered by this are unique to each and usually one Otome only has one, but more powerful Otomes like Arika and Nina have multiple.
- Butou - Formal ceremonial battles between Otome. Students may also engage in them. All of these special battles must be approved first, as they are subject to strict rules and procedures.

== Volume list ==
No.	Release date	ISBN
1	November 8, 2005	4-253-21051-1
1. Girl? meets ♀Girls (ガール?ミーツ♀ガールズ); 2. The Secret Flower Garden!? (秘密の花園!?); 3. Heaven and Hell (天国と地獄!?); 4. Battle of the Otome (オトメの戦い); 5. What I Want to Protect (守りたいもの); 6. Don't Tell Anyone (誰にも言えない); 7. Schwarz Entry (シュヴァルツ進入); 8. Political Talk (政治の話)
2	January 10, 2006	4-253-21052-X
9. Garderobe Escape (ガルデローベ脱走); 10. King's Return (王の帰還); 11. Revolutionary Soldier (革命戦士); 12. Meister Robe (マイスターローブ); 13. Erstin Ho's Tragedy (エルスティン・ホーの悲劇); 14. Super weapon (スーパー兵器); 15. Otome's Pinch!? (オトメのピンチ!?); 16. Otome vs MAID (オトメVSメイド); 17. Prisoner No. 17 (プリズナーNo.17)
3	April 7, 2006	4-253-21053-8
18. An Impact of Divine Terror (衝撃の愕天); 19. Beautiful Pursuer (美しき追跡者); 20. To the Black Valley (黒い谷へ); 21. Reunion (再会); 22. The King's Decision (王の選択); 23. Blue Sky Sapphire (蒼天の青玉); 24. A Decisive Round of Butou (舞闘決戦); 25. Leaking Confidential Information (極秘情報、漏れる); 26. The Meaning of Power (力の意味)
4	June 8, 2006	4-253-21054-6
27. A Time of Farewell (別離の時); 28. Coronation Day (戴冠の日); 29. A Throne of Blood (血の玉座); 30. Two Queens (ふたりの女王); 31. An Otome's Vow (オトメの誓い); 32. Fuuka Palace is Burning Down (風華宮、炎上); 33. The Door of Memories (記憶の扉); 34. Garderobe's Assault (ガルデローベ強襲); 35. A Memory of Flames (炎の記憶)
5	August 8, 2006	4-253-21055-4
36. Decision of an Otome (オトメとして); 37. Time of Resurrection (復活の時); 38. Materialise!! (マテリアライズ!!); 39. HiME vs Otome (HiME VS 乙-HiME); 40. Returning Memories (蘇る記憶); 41. A Stone that becomes Pure White (真白なる貴石); 42. Truth (真実); 43. Jet Black Despair (漆黒の絶望); 44. Welcome to Garderobe (ようこそガルデローベへ)
