= Russell Marcus =

Russell Marcus is a philosopher specializing in philosophy of mathematics and the pedagogy of philosophy. He is Chair of Philosophy at Hamilton College and president of the American Association of Philosophy Teachers.

== Education and career ==
Prior to his work in philosophy, Marcus taught mathematics and other subjects at high schools in New York City and Costa Rica. He received his bachelor of arts in philosophy at Swarthmore College in 1988. He received his doctorate from the Graduate Center of the City University of New York in 2007, where he wrote his dissertation "Numbers without Science". While at graduate school, he taught philosophy and mathematics at Queens College, Hofstra University and the College of Staten Island. He began teaching at Hamilton College in 2007, later setting up the Hamilton College Summer Program in Philosophy. He gained tenure in 2016 and was appointed Chair of Philosophy in 2020. In 2020, he won the American Philosophical Association's Prize for Excellence in Philosophy Teaching which "recognizes a philosophy teacher who has had a profound impact on the student learning of philosophy in undergraduate and/or pre-college settings", being cited as an "important scholar of teaching and learning in philosophy" for his summer program and "inventive team-based pedagogies and exemplary scaffolded assignments".

== Books ==
- Marcus, Russell (2015). Autonomy Platonism and the Indispensability Argument. Lanham: Lexington Books. ISBN 978-0-7391-7313-8.
- Marcus, Russell; McEvoy, Mark, eds. (2016). An Historical Introduction to the Philosophy of Mathematics: A Reader. London: Bloomsbury. ISBN 978-1-4725-2534-5.
- Marcus, Russell (2017). Introduction to Formal Logic with Philosophical Applications. New York: Oxford University Press. ISBN 978-0-19-938648-2.
