= Weinerville =

- Genre: Variety; Comedy; Puppetry
- Created by: Marc Weiner
- Presented by: Marc Weiner
- Starring: Ray Abruzzo; Brian Berns; Scott Fellows; David Jordon
- Country of origin: United States
- Original language: English
- No. of seasons: 2
- No. of episodes: 68

Production
- Production locations: Nickelodeon Studios Orlando, Florida
- Running time: 22 minutes

Original release
- Network: Nickelodeon
- Release: July 11, 1993 – February 17, 1996

Weinerville is an American variety television series that aired on Nickelodeon from July 11, 1993 to February 17, 1996. This series was based around a giant puppet stage that was designed to look like a city called Weinerville. It was created and hosted by Marc Weiner.

== Production ==
Weinerville's first season aired as part of a two-hour marathon every Sunday on Nickelodeon beginning on July 11, 1993. Weinerville quickly gained popularity; in the middle of the first season, on November 15, 1993, Nickelodeon began broadcasting it on weekday afternoons. Marc and his Weinerville characters hosted Nick New Year's, a New Year's Eve television special akin to Dick Clark's New Year's Rockin' Eve for the child demographic. Airing in 1993 and 1994, the New Year's Eve specials feature host segments, which serve as wraparounds for the best Nicktoons and shows of that year, where Weinerville characters read letters from viewers about their New Year's resolutions while counting down to midnight, at which point they celebrated by shooting slime into the sky.

For the 40-episode second season, which premiered on March 21, 1994, episodes aired daily and were later part of the Stick Stickly show Nick in the Afternoon, which includes Marc as Dottie in some segments.

== Overview ==
Weinerville was filmed at Nickelodeon Studios at Universal Studios Florida. Its format is an audience-participation comedy series that focuses on Weiner and his puppets making a show. While early episodes do not have much of a plot or story line the show started to integrate these elements later in season one. In addition to 68 normal episodes, Nickelodeon aired five Weinerville television specials.

Following the first segment and a prelude to "Playland", the viewers watch cartoons of Mr. Magoo, Honey Halfwitch, The Alvin Show, Gerald McBoing-Boing, Courageous Cat and Minute Mouse, and Batfink.

== Characters ==
=== Human characters ===
- Marc Weiner - The host of Nickelodeon's Weinerville who is tasked with solving Dottie's or the town's problems. In season one, Marc wears an unbuttoned Weinerville baseball jersey with a green undershirt. In season two, the color of his undershirt changes.
- Kevin Elemeno P. (pronounced: "L-M-N-O-P") - The network executive character, played by Orlando local child actor Travis Robertson, whose name is a pun on the show's executive producer, Kevin Kay.

=== Puppets ===
The puppets below feature Weiner's head and a puppet body; their parts are pre-taped so that Weiner can interact with them.

- Dottie - The mayor of Weinerville. Marc is usually forced to solve Dottie's problems and tends to get carried away with things if they do not get out of control. She has a sidekick/assistant named Zip. Dottie always quotes "Oh well, welcome to Weinerville" at the end of the cold opening.
- Baby Jeffrey - The puppet nephew of Marc. He usually introduces Marc at the beginning of each episode and always makes a mess.
- Big Pops - The owner of the diner Pops'. Big Pops usually does a lot with his nose, either picking it or playing the kazoo. Big Pops only appeared occasionally in Season One.
- Schnitzel - Marc's sassy parrot sidekick in season one. While Schnitzel is usually played by Marc, an unnamed extra plays him when Marc is in front of the audience.
- Commander Ozone - A space captain that runs the AV-1 Spaceship. He defeats evil and saves the universe with his sidekick Wilson. In season one he is named "Captain Ozone".
- Eric Von Firstensecond - Commander Ozone's evil enemy who always devises an evil scheme to take over Weinerville or to marry Dottie. Eric only appears in season two.
- Cocktail Frank - The bandleader and guitar player of the house band of the show "Cocktail Frank and His Weenies." Frank is the lead singer/guitarist where his puppet band consisted of Posse on piano/turntables, Antoinette on drums, an unnamed bass guitarist, and an unnamed saxophone player.
- Joey Deluxe - The big shot manager and super entertainment agent.
- Soup Tureen - The host of That's Not Fair who only appears in season two.

The ones listed below are puppet characters:

- Zip (performed by Scott Fellows) - Dottie's assistant who always gets himself into trouble, and crashes into the wall, accompanied by the Sound Ideas stock library sound effect: "Cartoon, Scream - Short Terror Scream, horror."
- Boney (performed by Marc Weiner) - An obvious parody of Barney, he is a dinosaur skeleton in sneakers that lives in the jungles of Weinerville. Boney is beloved by children, but hates them himself. When Boney quotes "Now get outta here," the children and anyone else visiting him that are present leave his cave. The "theme song" at the end of his show consists of said puppet singing "I'm Boney, I'm Boney, leave me aloney!" Boney's puppet appears differently in season two and the specials. According to the 1995 summer issue of Nickelodeon Magazine, Boney is Weiner's favorite puppet.
- Pops (performed by Ray Abruzzo) - Known in season one as "Little Pops", he is the local chef who works with Big Pops. After Big Pops is dropped from the show, Pops takes over the restaurant. He sometimes argues with Louie, but they tend to get along.
- Louie (performed by Scott Fellows) - The local laundromat owner who has disagreements with Pops, but they tend to get along.
- Socko (performed by Marc Weiner) - An inverted hand puppet who likes to kick Marc's buttocks, performed with his own props, who makes sarcastic gestures when things do not go right.
- Wilson - The sidekick of Commander Ozone. In season one, he has a squeaky voice like Zip.
- Professor Phosphate (performed by Scott Fellows and David Jordan) - A puppet scientist with green hair who can only be seen from the waist up who debuted in season two. Professor Phosphate is the owner of Weinerville Labs and often causes explosions with inventions that malfunction. Despite this, he often solves the problems.
- Fufusky - A grub-like alien who is Eric von Firstensecond's alien sidekick. He stuns people using his breath ray (silly string).
- Berny - He is responsible for bringing out the Weinerizer being pulled by his tractor.

=== Other sketches ===
The show also featured several non-puppet characters played by Weiner himself:

- Captain Bob - Captain Bob is a sea captain in yellow rain gear that constantly cracks puns. He owns the S.S. Bob at Port Weinerville (which is located near the building where Cocktail Frank and His Wienies are located). On many shows, an audience member would be invited to climb aboard where an offscreen person would fling water on him before the "tidal wave" (a bucket of water, or, in some cases, slime, thrown by a stage hand) soaked the participant. Captain Bob first appeared on Saturday Night Live when Weiner was a writer in the early 1980s. In scenes in which Marc Weiner interacts with Captain Bob, an actor seen from behind would portray Captain Bob with Weiner dubbing his voice in during post-production.
- The Weinerville General Store - Members of the audience are also called down to participate in various activities during the main part of the show, such as helping to demonstrate items in the Weinerville General Store. A recurring joke on the show takes place in the General Store, in which Weiner sells comedic props similar to those of Carrot Top. Nearly everything in the store sells for $13.50. It only appears in season one.
- Running Joke - Occasionally, the "$13.50" gag is used in other segments. For instance, on the "Talent Show" episode, the winners won with 1,350 points. On the "DTV" episode, DTV was on channel 1350. On the General Store and Captain Bob skits, that would be the price when Marc would hand the participant anything. "$13.50" originated as an inside joke between Weiner and head writer Ray Abruzzo. Thinking it was funny, the two ultimately put it in the show.
- That's Not Fair! - A game show where a kid and an adult played for points answering questions. Usually the kids win. It was only featured in Season 2. According to an interview with Marc Weiner, "That's Not Fair" was a pilot he made for Comedy Central in 1991, after it was tested, the network said it was appropriate for children, so Nickelodeon got a hold of it and the pilot became "Weinerville".
- Weinerizer — The show always ends with Weiner choosing two people from the audience to get "Weinerized" (turned into puppets). The participants enter a contraption called the Weinerizer upon being helped by two crew members. The Weinerizer appears to shrink them to puppet size (by having contestants place their heads into a hole above a miniature puppet body). They compete in a game and the winner receives "The Golden Hot Dog" as well as a dose of green slime. During the credits, the two people are seen being let out of the Weinerizer. Although the audience members were ostensibly chosen at random, Matt Day (who at the time was working on Nickelodeon's Clarissa Explains It All) revealed that participants were sometimes selected beforehand, including himself on the "Baseball" episode in Playland.
- Playland - In a prelude, Weiner selects two audience members to be placed in the Weinerizer and sent to Playland. In season two, an alarm sounds to alert Weiner that it is almost time for Playland. Participants then compete in a game to test their skills operating their puppet bodies. The runner-up receives the "Silver Hot Dog", with the winner receiving the "Golden Hot Dog" as well as the "Special Topping" (a small amount of green slime dumped onto the player's head). If a malfunction occurs or both players tie, they both get the "Golden Hot Dog". Occasionally, both players receive the Special Topping, especially when both players are adults, and if the game involves pies, both contestants are hit with pies themselves instead of anyone getting the Special Topping (the special topping is awarded for pie games in season two). The Playland stage was enlarged and revamped the second season to incorporate more elaborate stunts; these frequently had the contestants facing each other and squirting water or whipped cream at some target, usually soaking the other contestant in the process. Some season 2 stunts are team stunts where each player has a non-Weinerized teammate. Season one was a carnival-style. In the second season, it was a radio-active style.

== Episodes ==
All 68 episodes aired out of sequence and in no particular order. When the last episode was taped, it was the 1000th television episode to be shot at Nickelodeon Studios. The filming schedule for the second season was November 29, 1993, to February 14, 1994.

Season	Episodes	Originally released		Time slot
Season	Episodes	First released	Last released	Time slot
1	28	July 11, 1993	August 22, 1993	Sundays, 3:00 p.m. to 5:00 p.m.
2	40	March 21, 1994	1994	Weekdays, 3:30 p.m.
Specials	5	December 31, 1993	February 17, 1996	8:00 p.m. to midnight 3:00 to 4:00 p.m. 7:30 p.m. to midnight 8:00 p.m. 7:30 p.m.

=== Season 1 (1993) ===
No. overall	No. in season	Title	Cartoons	Playland	Original release date
1	1	"Marc's Mother Visits"	Gerald McBoing-Boing's Symphony (1953), Stage Door Magoo (1955) and A Leak in the Dike (1965)	Toys Away; Tim and Amity	July 11, 1993
Marc learns from Mayor Dottie that his mother is coming, which explains why most of its inhabitants don't want to be around when she arrives.
2	2	"Tooth Hurty"	Magoo's Young Manhood (1958) and Christopher Crumpet (1953)	Tooth or Consequences; Aaron and Zach	July 11, 1993
Marc teaches the importance of taking care of your teeth. Marc shows us we can recycle gum after we chewed it with the "Gum Again Machine" and shows us interesting chewed gum art work.
3	3	"Humidity"	Magoo's Express (1955) and Forget-Me-Nuts (1967)	Splish-Splash; Cindy and Adam	July 11, 1993
A huge heat wave hits Weinerville as everyone tries to stay cool.
4	4	"Cleaning Day"	Magoo's Cruise (1958) and Baggin' the Dragon (1966)	Go Fish; Cathy and Eddie	July 11, 1993
While cleaning up Schnitzel's poop, Marc is called by Mayor Dottie to help get Zip out of the vacuum cleaner.
5	5	"Zip in Space"	The Dog Snatcher (1952) and A Wedding Knight (1966)	Rock-N-Rocket; Matthew and Julie	July 18, 1993
Zip plays on a toy rocket ship and is accidentally launched into outer space. Marc and Mayor Dottie enlist Captain Ozone to help rescue Zip. Note: Segments cut in 1996.: Courageous Cat and Minute Mouse: The Case of the Bet a Million Frog replaces Mr. Magoo: The Dog Snatcher; Batfink: Daniel Boom replaces Modern Madcaps: A Wedding Knight
6	6	"Missing Cartoon"	Punchy de Leon (1950), Ragtime Bear (1949) and Potions and Notions (1966)	The Heist; Paul and Blair	July 18, 1993
Mayor Dottie enlists a detective named Nick Tracy to find the missing cartoons.
7	7	"Giant Spider"	The Miner's Daughter (1950) and Alter Egotist (1967)	Arachnophobia; Melinda and Jason	July 18, 1993
A giant spider has caught Zip.
8	8	"Haunted"	The Story of George Washington (1965) and Bwana Magoo (1959)	Ghosts-A-Sliden; Rick and Erica	July 18, 1993
Marc learns from Mayor Dottie that ghosts have been haunting Weinerville.
9	9	"Fitness"	How Now Boing Boing (1954) and Christopher Crumpet's Playmate (1955)	Jammin; Jennifer and Brian	July 25, 1993
After Marc overeats and becomes fat, Dottie puts him on a vigorous exercise program.
10	10	"Football"	Magoo's Canine Mutiny (1956) and A Wedding Knight (1966)	Chris and Megan	July 25, 1993
Marc starts a football team as Big Pops, Mayor Dottie, and Socko want to be on it as the quarterback.
11	11	"Zip Stuck in VCR"	Giddyap (1950) and Keep the Cool, Baby (1967)	Couch Potatoes; Charles and Courtney	July 25, 1993
Zip gets stuck in the VCR as Mayor Dottie works to get him out.
12	12	"Magic"	Matador Magoo (1957) and Throne for a Loss (1966)	Hare Today, Gone Tomorrow; Rick and Victoria	July 25, 1993
Mayor Dottie has a magic kit and she has to use instructions. She zapped Zip too many times, but she can't stop waving with her wand.
13	13	"Bubblegum"	Rock-Hound Magoo (1957) and Boy Pest with Osh (1963)	Bubble Trouble; Dave and Heather	August 1, 1993
Upon seeing Mayor Dottie's bubblegum-blowing trophies, Zip starts blowing bubblegum and starts getting trapped.
14	14	"Talent Show"	Merry Minstrel Magoo (1959) and High But Not Dry (1967)	Pong! Chris and Nick	August 1, 1993
Weinerville is holding a talent show where Big Pops plays the kazoo with his nose, Marc juggles, and Dottie does a mime act. However, Captain Bob's drums and hula girl wins!
15	15	"Dottie's Birthday"	Scoutmaster Magoo (1958) and The Magic Fluke (1949)	Pie in your Eye; Gloria and Jeff	August 1, 1993
It's Mayor Dottie's birthday as Marc tries to find her a good birthday present.
16	16	"Spaghetti"	Mouse Trek (1967), Magoo Saves the Bank (1957) and My Daddy the Astronaut (1967)	Spaghetti and Meatballs; Stephanie and Nicole	August 1, 1993
Big Pops makes his special spaghetti and meatballs which everyone wants to try as he demonstrates how he makes it.
17	17	"Bake Off"	Madcap Magoo (1955), My Daddy the Astronaut (1967) and Think or Sink (1967)	Let Em' Eat Cake! Pam and Justin	August 8, 1993
The citizens of Weinerville are baking cakes in order to raise money for the Old Puppets Home.
18	18	"Balloon Zip"	Magoo's Homecoming (1959), A Balmy Knight (1966) and The Stuck-Up Wolf (1967)	Balls-A-Rollin; Carrie and Steven	August 8, 1993
Mayor Dottie gets some balloons from Nick Tracy (who was last seen in "Missing Cartoons"). When Zip asks Mayor Dottie for a balloon, he gets stuck on one of them. Meanwhile, Pops and Louie have an argument on who has been belching smoke near their buildings.
19	19	"Baseball"	Magoo's Masquerade (1957) and The Blacksheep Blacksmith (1967)	Batter Up; Maria and Matt	August 8, 1993
Zip takes an interest in joining Weinerville's baseball team, while practicing his batting. Marc has been getting tired of Schnitzel's jokes that he tells the audience to test there hand eye coordination by focusing on throwing baseballs at a target, like Schnitzel!
20	20	"Budget Cutbacks"	Gerald McBoing-Boing (1950), Pink and Blue Blues (1952) and The Opera Caper (1967)	Makes No Cents; Donna and Matthew	August 8, 1993
Mayor Dottie gets a call from the Head of the Network that there is going to be some budget cutbacks.
21	21	"Popcorn"	Magoo's Lodge Brother (1959) and Trash Program (1963)	Pop-Corny; Lisa and Osca	August 15, 1993
Zip cooks up some popcorn. However, he uses way too much and the whole Puppet City is covered in popcorn.
22	22	"Recycling"	Magoo Goes Skiing (1954), Calling Doctor Magoo (1956) and The Itch (1965)	Get it While you Can; Brad and Leigh	August 15, 1993
Everyone in Weinerville does their part in recycling.
23	23	"Snow Day"	Magoo Slept Here (1953) and The Fuz (1967)	Just Say Snow; Jeannine and Lorenzo	August 15, 1993
It's snowing in Puppet City, Little Pops shovels all his snow to Louie's door, closing him in.
24	24	"Train Ride"	Ballet-Oop (1954) and Frog's Legs (1962)	Scott and lnes	August 15, 1993
Zip rides a train in Dottie's office, but it goes out of control and Zip goes crashing through the wall. Marc has his own train with a couple children from the audience, and tells them to smile and wave and makes a ratings joke.
25	25	"Zip's Family Treasure"	Sloppy Jalopy (1952) and Bringing Up Mother (1954)	Treasure Hunt; Debbie and Patrick	August 22, 1993
Dottie puts together a séance to connect with the spirit of Zip's great grandfather to find out where his family treasure is buried. Things however keep on interrupting her.
26	26	"Ziggy Zag Concert"	How Now Boing Boing (1954) and From Nags to Witches (1966)	Keep on Truckin; Michelle and Summer	August 22, 1993
The Ziggy Zag Concert is occurring in Weinerville.
27	27	"Camp Idontwanna"	When Magoo Flew (1954) and Clean Sweep (1967)	Balloon Busters; Josh and Louisa	August 22, 1993
Baby Jeffrey, Marc's nephew, is going to camp. Dottie was nice and packed for him. Due to rules, Dottie packed too many suitcases and has to repack!
28	28	"Auxiliary Satellite System"	Georgie and the Dragon (1951) and A Leak in the Dike (1965)	Meteor Shower; Matthew and Jessica	August 22, 1993
Dottie can't watch TV, her auxiliary satellite is on the fritz. So she calls for Captain Ozone to try and fix it. Then Boney tells us about "Jack and the bean stock", "Humpty Dumpty", and "Little Red Riding Hood". Dottie finally ends up having Zip be her satellite because his legs pick up great reception.

=== Season 2 (1994) ===
No. overall	No. in season	Title	Cartoons	Playland	Original release date
29	1	"Weinerville Vs. The Rats"	TBA	TBA	March 21, 1994
Professor Phosphate's rats escape from his lab and are all over Weinerville.
30	2	"Viva La Weinerville"	Crashcup Invents Baseball (1961) and The Dirty Sinker (1967)	Eating Elvises; Sophie and Bobby	March 22, 1994
Dottie returns from her Las Vegas vacation and decides to add lots of flash and pizzaz to Weinerville.
31	3	"The Ever Popular Tortured Robot Effect"	TBA	TBA	March 23, 1994
Dottie feels burned out and leaves for vacation, leaving Marc to audition people to be acting mayor, Phosphate invents a hologram of Dottie but it malfunctions.
32	4	"Who's on Firstensecond"	Sam Valiant: Private Nose and Working on the Railroad (1961)	Spell Bound; Mike and Nik	March 24, 1994
Eric Von Firstensecond is plotting to take over Weinerville by taking over the citizen's minds! All but Marc and Commander Ozone are unaffected because then the show wouldn't have an ending.
33	5	"There Goes the Neighborhood"	TBA	TBA	March 25, 1994
Donald Rump (parody of Donald Trump) is trying to buy out Weinerville to make room for a burger joints and casino. Forcing the citizens to sell their homes.
34	6	"60 Seconds & Counting"	TBA	TBA	
Weinerville is part of a “60 Seconds” news story.
35	7	"Don't Be Alarmed"	TBA	TBA	
Marc and the Weinerville characters teach us about fire safety.
36	8	"Be Careful What You Wish For"	TBA	TBA	
Dottie won a magic lamp and everyone in Weinerville gets a chance to make ONE wish, unfortunately they don't turn out the way they think.
37	9	"Puppet's Court"	TBA	TBA	
Pop's and Louie's arguments have got out of control until finally Marc has an idea to settle their latest dispute in the puppet's court with Dottie being the judge.
38	10	"Do It Yourself Fever"	TBA	TBA	
The citizens of Weinerville show off their “Do-It-Yourself” skills and unfortunately the Weinerizer breaks, but Zip and Marc offers their best to fix it.
39	11	"Al B. Darned"	TBA	TBA	
(Episode has not surfaced)
40	12	"Citizen Louie"	TBA	TBA	
Louie, after waiting many years for his papers gets to become a citizen of Weinerville! So the gang throws him a party!
41	13	"Louie L'amore"	Alvin's Cruise (1961) and Magoo's Glorious Fourth (1957)	Louie Loves Ya; Dennis and Pam	
Louie has a crush on Dottie!
42	14	"I Heard That"	TBA	TBA	
Dottie goes on vacation and has a relative to fill in for her, who happens to boss around the Weinerville gang like a drill sergeant.
43	15	"Brain Switch"	TBA	Pie Switch; Greg and Leigh (Kids); Billy and Cathy (Parents)	
Dottie and Commander Ozone switch bodies in a Freaky Friday fashion.
44	16	"Mirror Mirror"	TBA	Push My Button; Kathleen and Michael (Kids); Karen and Jeff (Parents)	
Commander Ozone and Wilson are entering coordinates to visit Weinerville. However, Wilson let his hair grow too long, that he reads the coordinates backwards. They crash into a world just like Weinerville, but backwards.
45	17	"Boney, Boney Everywhere"	TBA	TBA	
Professor Phosphate's invention goes wrong, and after an explosion of toxic gas that spreads makes everyone in Weinerville act like Boney. Except Marc, his nose is stuffed up.
46	18	"Spin Offs"	TBA	TBA	
Dottie got wind of the network wanting a show to air before "Weinerville". but news travels fast that everyone in Puppet City comes up with a new spinoff show.
47	19	"Dottie's High School Reunion"	Swami Salami (1967) & The Case of the Fugitive at Large (1960)	Most Likely to be Creamed; Sean and Nick	
Dottie has been invited to her high school reunion. Not particularly excited, she invites Socko as her date and makes a great impression.
48	20	"Excess"	Ringading Brothers (1966) and Squares (1961)	Do the Cancan; Mysti and Cherrion	
Dottie is addicted to the "Loca Cola" soda and learns a lesson on when to say "no".
49	21	"Weinervilla"	Ostrich and The Brave Chipmunks (1961)	TBA	
Weinerville is being sued by a Spanish show called "Weinervilla" claiming "Weinerville" stole their idea.
50	22	"Ego Mania"	TBA	TBA	
Everybody in Weinerville has their ego's out of control, even Boney is threatening to quit unless he gets "Barney" money. So Marc calls upon Kevin Elemeno P. to come and be the voice of reason. However, Kevin runs the Weinerizer and Playland and his ego gets out of control.
51	23	"No Time to Talk"	The Little Dog (1961) and Crashcup Invents Glass (1962)	Time Flies When You're Having Fun; Leslie and Tara (kids); Linda and Marcy (mothers)	
Marc has so much to do, but Dottie forces him to do her shopping, as she needs to make a report for the network executive, Kevin. Marc eventually comes back, and Dottie faxes the report and keeps Kevin from shutting the show down.
52	24	"DTV"	Strolling Through the Park (1961) and This Is Your Life (1961)	Pie Chart; Jody and Annie (parents); Brian and Tomica (kids)	
Dottie abandons her role as the Mayor of Weinerville and starts her own public access fly-by-night cable network.
53	25	"Princess Dottie"	TBA	TBA	
(Episode has not surfaced)
54	26	"Election Day"	TBA	TBA	
(Episode has not surfaced)
55	27	"Who's Marc?"	Ragtime Cowboy Joe (1962) and Crashcup Invents the Telephone (1962)	Pie Chart; Paul and Aggie (parents); Jeff and Allison (kids)	
Marc hits his head and loses his memory after Mayor Dottie tells him that the head of the network Clara Cloud is coming. Now Dottie, Zip, Pops, Louie, Socko, and Professor Phosphate must find a way to restore Marc's memory.
56	28	"Dotterella"	TBA	TBA	
(Episode has not surfaced)
57	29	"Zip's Rebellion"	Crashcup Invents the Baby (1961) and The Short Circuit Case (1966)	My Zippy's Stuck; Jessica and Dustin (kids); John and Doug (fathers)	
Zip and Dottie get into an argument and quits his job and leaves Weinerville, so he tries to work for Commander Ozone. Things don't workout for Zip so he decides to go back home, unfortunately Zip gets stuck in Ozone's tracker beam.
58	30	"The Dating Connection"	TBA	TBA	
Dottie gets a love letter from an old flame that lives in Alaska. She leaves over night, not knowing that Marc planned a Dating Game for Dottie, none of the three bachelor's can see Dottie. So, Marc provides the voice.
59	31	"Don't Call Us, We'll Call You"	TBA	TBA	
Marc is directing and working on casting for a motion picture based on Weinerville which actors and actresses try out for their roles.
60	32	"The Time Machine"	TBA	TBA	
Professor Phosphate creates a device that can look through the future and the past.
61	33	"Firstensecond Makes a Dump"	Polly Wolly Doodle and Theodore's Dog (1962)	Kid Power; Tania and Marlene	
Eric von Firstensecond uses Weinerville as his landfill area. While Marc works on a way to clean up the mess, Zip becomes Eco Man to combat Eric von Firstensecond.
62	34	"The Player"	Chipmunk Song and Overworked Alvin (1961)	What Goes Up Must Come Down; Talya and Dr. Joyce Brothers	
Dottie invents a new video game called “The X-R3 Space Shuttle”, that becomes a success. Firstensecond sees how much money she made, asks her to marry him. Dottie refuses so Firstensecond plots a scheme to kidnap Marc and Socko.
63	35	"Big Hot Dog Circus"	TBA	TBA	
(Episode has not surfaced)
64	36	"Marriage of Firstensecond"	TBA	TBA	
(Episode has not surfaced)
65	37	"America's Most Hunted"	TBA	TBA	
Socko is framed for a crime he didn't commit.
66	38	"An Officer & a Weiner"	TBA	TBA	
(Episode has not surfaced)
67	39	"Hide the Boney"	TBA	TBA	
(Episode has not surfaced)
68	40	"It's Two, Two, Two Shows in One"	Theodore's Dog (1961) and Destination Magoo (1954)	Show of Shows; Phil Moore and Jessica	
Dottie and Marc disagree on what the show is, but finally come to an agreement after turning the show into a sitcom (I Love Lucy parody, with Marc playing the husband). Then the second half was a variety show with dancers, and even a song "Welcome to Weinerville"

=== Specials ===
Title	Guest appearances	Original release date
"Nick New Year's Eve"	TBA	December 31, 1993
Marc and his Weinerville characters host the best Nickelodeon shows and Nicktoons of 1993.
"The Weinerville New Year's Special: Lost in the Big Apple"	Mike Maronna, Mellissa Joan Hart, Paul Shaffer, Marc Summers	December 31, 1994
When Marc and the Weinerville gang head to New York City for New Year's, Dottie informs them that they have to join Cocktail Frank and His Weenies to perform at Nick's New Year's Eve party.
"Nick New Year's '95"	Danny Tamberelli and Melissa Joan Hart	December 31, 1994
Marc and his Weinerville characters host the best Nickelodeon shows and Nicktoons of 1994 in Times Square.
"The Weinerville Chanukah Special"	Joanne Blum as Nivek, Michael Gunst as Sinrek, Brian O'Connor as Antidorkus, Diesel, Denny Dillon, Laura Kightlinger, Buster Poindexter, and Marc Summers	December 14, 1995
The Weinerville inhabitants are celebrating Chanukah at the Weinerville Ski Lodge as Marc is on his way there with his family and friends. Two potato pancake-looking Sectos named Nivek and Sinrek are pursued by the evil alien king Antidorkus of the Kerg Empire and crash-land at the Weinerville Ski Lodge where they receive the help of Boney, Socko, and Fluffy the Dog.
"The Weinerville Election Special: From Washington B.C."	Philip Mansfield as Hugh J. Magnate, Joe O'Connor as Knuckles, and Preslaysa Edwards as Liberty Brown	February 17, 1996
Boney runs for President of the United States, and the Weinerville gang helps him with his campaign. However, the other candidate Hugh J. Magnate is not pleased and is working on an evil scheme to sabotage Boney along with his henchman "Knuckles". With the help of Boney's campaign manager Liberty Brown, they will expose Hugh for his evil plan to turn all the nation's parks into parking lots.

== Guest stars ==
- Marc Summers of Double Dare is referenced regularly, including cameos in "Giant Spider" and the Chanukah, New Year's, and election specials.
- Pro Wrestler Kevin Nash in the "Chanukah Special"
- Phil Moore of Nick Arcade in "Variety Show or Sitcom"
- Dr. Joyce Brothers in "XR-3 Space Shuttle Game"
- Denny Dillon in the Chanukah special
- Buster Poindexter in the Chanukah special
- Moira Quirk of Nickelodeon Guts in "Variety Show or Sitcom"
- Huey Lewis
- The cast of Clarissa Explains It All in "DTV"

(not all interviews are shown, Sean O'Neal and Jason Zimbler are just quickly glimpsed)

- Melissa Joan Hart in the New Year's and election specials and "DTV"
- Mike Maronna of The Adventures of Pete & Pete cameos in the New Year's special
- Paul Shaffer cameos in the New Year's special
- Bill Maher in the election special
- John Tesh and Mary Hart in the election special
- Leeza Gibbons in the election special
- Pat O'Brien in the election special
- Joe Lieberman in the election special
- Andy Lawrence
