= List of UPA cartoons =

The following is a listing of every United Productions of America (UPA) short released through Columbia Pictures from 1948 to 1959, as well as a complete feature film list and an incomplete list of TV series, industrial films and training films.

== Theatrical filmography ==
=== Shorts ===
Title	Series	Director	Release date	Notes
Robin Hoodlum	Fox and Crow	John Hubley	December 23, 1948	Academy Award Nominee
The Magic Fluke	Fox and Crow	John Hubley	March 27, 1949	Academy Award Nominee
The Ragtime Bear	Jolly Frolics	John Hubley	September 8, 1949	First appearance of Mr. Magoo
Punchy De Leon	Jolly Frolics	John Hubley	January 12, 1950	Last appearance of Fox and Crow
Spellbound Hound	Jolly Frolics	Pete Burness	March 16, 1950	Second appearance of Mr. Magoo
The Miner's Daughter	Jolly Frolics	Robert Cannon	May 25, 1950	
Giddyap	Jolly Frolics	Art Babbitt	July 27, 1950	
Trouble Indemnity	Mr. Magoo	Pete Burness	September 14, 1950	Academy Award Nominee
Gerald McBoing-Boing	Jolly Frolics	Robert Cannon	November 2, 1950	First appearance of Gerald McBoing Boing; Academy Award Winner; Inducted into the National Film Registry in 1995
The Popcorn Story	Jolly Frolics	Art Babbitt	November 30, 1950	
Bungled Bungalow	Mr. Magoo	Pete Burness	December 28, 1950	
The Family Circus	Jolly Frolics	Art Babbitt	January 25, 1951	
Barefaced Flatfoot	Mr. Magoo	John Hubley	April 26, 1951	
Georgie and the Dragon	Jolly Frolics	Robert Cannon	September 27, 1951	
Fuddy Duddy Buddy	Mr. Magoo	John Hubley	October 18, 1951	
Rooty Toot Toot	Jolly Frolics	John Hubley	November 15, 1951	Academy Award Nominee
The Wonder Gloves	Jolly Frolics	Robert Cannon	November 29, 1951	
Grizzly Golfer	Mr. Magoo	Pete Burness	December 20, 1951	
The Oompahs	Jolly Frolics	Robert Cannon	January 24, 1952	
Sloppy Jalopy	Mr. Magoo	Pete Burness	February 21, 1952	
The Dog Snatcher	Mr. Magoo	Pete Burness	May 29, 1952	
Willie the Kid	Jolly Frolics	Robert Cannon	June 26, 1952	
Pink and Blue Blues	Mr. Magoo	Pete Burness	August 28, 1952	Academy Award Nominee
Pete Hothead	Jolly Frolics	Pete Burness	September 25, 1952	
Hotsy Footsy	Mr. Magoo	William T. Hurtz	October 23, 1952	
Madeline	Jolly Frolics	Robert Cannon	November 27, 1952	Academy Award Nominee
Captains Outrageous	Mr. Magoo	Pete Burness	December 25, 1952	
Little Boy with a Big Horn		Robert Cannon	March 26, 1953	
The Emperor's New Clothes		Ted Parmelee	April 30, 1953	
Safety Spin	Mr. Magoo	Pete Burness	May 21, 1953	
Christopher Crumpet		Robert Cannon	June 25, 1953	Academy Award Nominee
Gerald McBoing Boing's Symphony	Gerald McBoing Boing	Robert Cannon	July 15, 1953	
Magoo's Masterpiece	Mr. Magoo	Pete Burness	July 30, 1953	
The Unicorn in the Garden		William T. Hurtz	September 24, 1953	BAFTA Award Nominee
Magoo Slept Here	Mr. Magoo	Pete Burness	November 19, 1953	
The Tell-Tale Heart		Ted Parmelee	December 17, 1953	Academy Award Nominee; Inducted into the National Film Registry in 2001
When Magoo Flew	Mr. Magoo	Pete Burness	January 6, 1954	Academy Award Winner; First UPA cartoon to be filmed in CinemaScope
Bringing Up Mother	Family Circus	William T. Hurtz	January 14, 1954	
Ballet-Oop		Robert Cannon	February 11, 1954	
Magoo Goes Skiing	Mr. Magoo	Pete Burness	March 11, 1954	
The Man on the Flying Trapeze		Ted Parmelee	April 8, 1954	
The Fifty-First Dragon		Arthur Heinemann	June 15, 1954	Produced for the TV series "Omnibus" in 1952; Self-distributed by UPA
Fudget's Budget		Robert Cannon	June 17, 1954	BAFTA Award Nominee
Kangaroo Courting	Mr. Magoo	Pete Burness	July 22, 1954	
How Now Boing Boing	Gerald McBoing Boing	Robert Cannon	September 9, 1954	
Destination Magoo	Mr. Magoo	Pete Burness	December 16, 1954	
Spare the Child	Family Circus	Abe Liss	January 27, 1955	
Magoo's Check Up	Mr. Magoo	Pete Burness	February 24, 1955	
Four Wheels No Brakes		Ted Parmelee	March 25, 1955	
Baby Boogie		Paul Julian	May 18, 1955	
Magoo Express	Mr. Magoo	Pete Burness	May 19, 1955	BAFTA Award Nominee
Madcap Magoo	Mr. Magoo	Pete Burness	June 23, 1955	
Christopher Crumpet's Playmate		Robert Cannon	September 8, 1955	BAFTA Award Nominee
Stage Door Magoo	Mr. Magoo	Pete Burness	October 6, 1955	
The Rise of Duton Lang		Osmond Evans	December 1, 1955	
Magoo Makes News	Mr. Magoo	Pete Burness	December 12, 1955	
Gerald McBoing! Boing! on Planet Moo	Gerald McBoing Boing	Robert Cannon	February 9, 1956	Academy Award Nominee; BAFTA Award Winner
Magoo's Canine Mutiny	Mr. Magoo	Pete Burness	March 8, 1956	
Magoo Goes West	Mr. Magoo	Pete Burness	April 19, 1956	
Calling Doctor Magoo	Mr. Magoo	Pete Burness	May 24, 1956	
The Jaywalker		Robert Cannon	May 31, 1956	Academy Award Nominee
Magoo Beats the Heat	Mr. Magoo	Pete Burness	June 21, 1956	
Magoo's Puddle Jumper	Mr. Magoo	Pete Burness	July 26, 1956	Academy Award Winner
Trailblazer Magoo	Mr. Magoo	Pete Burness	September 13, 1956	
Magoo's Problem Child	Mr. Magoo	Pete Burness	October 18, 1956	
Meet Mother Magoo	Mr. Magoo	Pete Burness	December 27, 1956	
Magoo Goes Overboard	Mr. Magoo	Pete Burness	February 21, 1957	
Matador Magoo	Mr. Magoo	Pete Burness	March 30, 1957	
Magoo Breaks Par	Mr. Magoo	Pete Burness	June 27, 1957	
Magoo's Glorious Fourth	Mr. Magoo	Pete Burness	July 25, 1957	
Magoo's Masquerade	Mr. Magoo	Rudy Larriva	August 15, 1957	
Magoo Saves the Bank	Mr. Magoo	Pete Burness	September 26, 1957	
Rockhound Magoo	Mr. Magoo	Pete Burness	October 24, 1957	
Magoo's Moosehunt	Mr. Magoo	Robert Cannon	November 28, 1957	
Magoo's Private War	Mr. Magoo	Rudy Larriva	December 19, 1957	
Trees and Jamaica Daddy	Ham and Hattie	Fred Crippen; Lew Keller	December 29, 1957	Academy Award Nominee
Sailing and Village Band	Ham and Hattie	Fred Crippen; Lew Keller	February 27, 1958	
Magoo's Young Manhood	Mr. Magoo	Pete Burness	March 13, 1958	
Scoutmaster Magoo	Mr. Magoo	Robert Cannon	April 10, 1958	
The Explosive Mr. Magoo	Mr. Magoo	Pete Burness	May 8, 1958	
Magoo's Three Point Landing	Mr. Magoo	Pete Burness	June 5, 1958	
Magoo's Cruise	Mr. Magoo	Rudy Larriva	September 11, 1958	
Love Comes to Magoo	Mr. Magoo	Tom McDonald	October 2, 1958	
Spring and Saganaki	Ham and Hattie	Fred Crippen; Lew Keller	October 16, 1958	
Gumshoe Magoo	Mr. Magoo	Gil Turner	November 1, 1958	
Bwana Magoo	Mr. Magoo	Tom McDonald	January 9, 1959	
Picnics Are Fun and Dino's Serenade	Ham and Hattie	Fred Crippen; Lew Keller	January 16, 1959	
Magoo's Homecoming	Mr. Magoo	Gil Turner	March 5, 1959	
Merry Minstrel Magoo	Mr. Magoo	Rudy Larriva	April 9, 1959	
Magoo's Lodge Brother	Mr. Magoo	Rudy Larriva	May 7, 1959	
Terror Faces Magoo	Mr. Magoo	Chris Ishii; Jack Goodford	July 9, 1959	
Magoo Meets Boing-Boing	Mr. Magoo	Abe Levitow	December 27, 1959	Self-distributed by UPA; Produced for the TV series Mister Magoo (1960)
Magoo Meets Frankenstein	Mr. Magoo	Gil Turner	March 20, 1960	Self-distributed by UPA; Produced for the TV series Mister Magoo (1960)
I Was a Teenage Magoo	Mr. Magoo	Clyde Geronimi	November, 1960	Self-distributed by UPA; Produced for the TV series Mister Magoo (1960)

=== Features ===
Produced

- 1001 Arabian Nights (1959) (released by Columbia Pictures)
- Gay Purr-ee (1962) (released by Warner Bros. Pictures)

Other

- No Minor Vices (1948) (animated sequence)
- The Red Pony (1949) (special effects)
- Dreamboat (1952) (animation)
- The Four Poster (1952) (animation)
- The Girl Next Door (1953) (animation)
- The Vikings (1958) (title sequence)
- What's Up, Tiger Lily? (1966) (title sequence)

== Television filmography ==
=== Television series ===
- The Roy Rogers Show (1951–1957) (main titles)
- The Gerald McBoing-Boing Show (1956–1957)
- The Garry Moore Show (1958) (main titles)
- The Twilight Zone (1959) (main titles)
- Mister Magoo (1960–1961)
- The Dick Tracy Show (1961–1962)
- The Famous Adventures of Mr. Magoo (1964–1965)
- What's New, Mr. Magoo? (1977–1979) (Produced by DePatie–Freleng Enterprises in association with UPA.)

=== Specials ===
- Our Mr. Sun (1956) (main titles and inserts)
- Mister Magoo's Christmas Carol (1962)
- Uncle Sam Magoo (1970)

=== TV Shorts ===
Release year	Title	Director	Notes
1949	Dusty of the Circus	Gene Deitch	TV pilot
1951	Frosty the Snowman	Robert Cannon	Produced for Hill & Range Songs, Inc.
1951	Peter Cottontail	Robert Cannon	Produced for Hill & Range Songs, Inc.
1952	The Fifty-First Dragon	Art Heinemann	Produced for the TV series "Omnibus"
1953	Howdy Doody and His Magic Hat	Gene Deitch	Produced for the TV series "The Howdy Doody Show"
1955	The Invisible Moustache of Raoul Dufy	Aurelius Battaglia	Produced for the Museum of Modern Art's Television Project and NBC BAFTA Award Nominee
1959	Bric's Stew	Harvey Toombs	TV pilot

== Miscellaneous filmography ==
Release year	Title	Director	Commissioned by	Notes
1944	A Few Quick Facts about Diarrhea and Dysentery		U.S. Army Signal Corps	
1944	A Few Quick Facts about Inflation	Osmond Evans	U.S. Army Signal Corps	
1944	A Few Quick Facts about Lend-Lease	Osmond Evans	U.S. Army Signal Corps	
1944	Hell-Bent for Election	Chuck Jones	United Auto Workers	
1945	A Few Quick Facts about Fear	Zack Schwartz	U.S. Army Signal Corps	
1945	A Few Quick Facts about Japan	Osmond Evans	U.S. Army Signal Corps	
1945	Brotherhood of Man	Robert Cannon	United Auto Workers	
1945	Fuel Tank Selection	Zack Schwartz	U.S. Navy Flight Safety Division	
1945	Join-Up Collisions	Robert Cannon	U.S. Navy Flight Safety Division	
1945	Take-Off Accidents	John Hubley	U.S. Navy Flight Safety Division	
1946	After the Cut	John Hubley	U.S. Navy Flight Safety Division	
1946	Check and Double Check		United Jewish Welfare Fund	
1946	Collisions with the Earth	John Hubley	U.S. Navy Flight Safety Division	
1946	Disorientation Crashes	William T. Hurtz	U.S. Navy	
1946	Flat Hatting	John Hubley	U.S. Navy Flight Safety Division	
1946	Idling Mixture Check	John Hubley	U.S. Navy Flight Safety Division	
1946	In Your Power		U.S. Navy Bureau of Naval Personnel	
1946	Taxiing Collisions	John Hubley	U.S. Navy Flight Safety Division	
1947	Accident Injury Prevention	John Hubley	U.S. Navy Flight Safety Division	
1947	Emergency Landings on Land	John Hubley	U.S. Navy Flight Safety Division	
1947	Expanding World Relationships	David Hilberman	U.S. State Department	
1947	How a Bill Goes through Congress		U.S. State Department	
1947	Landing Accidents	John Hubley	U.S. Navy Flight Safety Division	
1947	Marginal Weather Accidents	John Hubley	U.S. Navy Flight Safety Division	
1947	Public Opinion Polls	John Hubley	U.S. State Department	
1947	Three Unions		U.S. State Department	
1948	About Sensations (Inside Morgan's Head)	John Hubley	U.S. Navy Flight Safety Division	
1948	Accidents Resulting from Unfamiliarity in Aircraft; or, The Rover Boys in Peril	John Hubley	U.S. Navy Flight Safety Division	
1948	Swab Your Choppers	John Hubley	U.S. Navy Bureau of Medicine and Surgery	
1949	Bailing Out	Robert Cannon	U.S. Navy Flight Safety Division	
1949	Big Tim	Robert Cannon	Timken Roller Bearing Co.	
1949	Collisions during Simulated Combat	Robert Cannon	U.S. Navy Flight Safety Division	
1949	Hazards in Ground Operation in Jet Aircraft	John Hubley	U.S. Navy Flight Safety Division	
1949	Jet Wings for Tomorrow	Lew Keller	Douglas Aircraft Company	
1949	The Sailor and the Seagull	John Hubley	U.S. Navy Bureau of Naval Personnel	
1950	Cherry Rivet Application		Cherry Rivet Co.	
1950	Sad Sack		U.S. Veterans Administration	
1951	Discipline Pays Off		U.S. Navy	
1951	Man on the Land	William T. Hurtz	American Petroleum Institute	
1952	Just Between Us Girls		Carson-Roberts, Inc.	
1952	Man Alive!	William T. Hurtz	American Cancer Society	Academy Award Nominee
1952	More Than Meets the Eye	William T. Hurtz	CBS Radio	
1953	It's Time for Everybody	Robert Cannon	CBS Radio	
1954	Look Who's Driving	William T. Hurtz	Aetna Casualty and Surety Company	
1954	Pump Trouble	Gene Deitch	American Heart Association	
1954	Tune in Tomorrow	Robert Cannon	CBS Radio	
1955	Hooray for Homer	Gene Deitch	Baltimore and Ohio Railroad	
1956	Sappy Homiens: The Story of An Animated Cartoon	Leo Salkin	American Cancer Society	
1960	Inside Magoo	Abe Levitow	American Cancer Society	
1961	Mr. Digit and the Battle of Bubbling Brook	Chuck Couch Robert Larsen	Bell System	

=== Slide films ===
Release year	Title	Commissioned by
1943	Sparks and Chips Get the Blitz	Consolidated Shipyards
1945	Collective Bargaining	United Auto Workers
1945	Saga of 666	United Auto Workers
1945	Svenson's Seniority	United Auto Workers
1946	Guaranteed Wages	National CIO Education Department
1946	Healthy, Wealthy and Wise	Kaiser Permanente Health Foundation
1946	Hold It, Mac!	U.S. Navy Insurance Division
1946	Man in the Cage	Fair Employment Practice Films
1946	Democratic Living	U.S. Department of Education
1946	Safety at Play	U.S. Department of Education
1946	Wholesome Living	U.S. Department of Education
1946	Tom, Dick and Mary	General Electric Company
1950	Open Door to Sales	Forest Lawn Insurance Company
