= The Unicorn in the Garden (film) =

1953 animated film

- Film still from the cartoon
- A Unicorn in the Garden; (alternate title)
- Directed by: William Hurtz
- Based on: The Unicorn in the Garden by James Thurber
- Produced by: Stephen Bosustow
- Music by: David Raksin
- Animation by: Phil Monroe; Rudy Larriva; Tom McDonald
- Backgrounds by: Robert Dranko
- Production company: United Productions of America
- Distributed by: Columbia Pictures
- Release date: September 24, 1953
- Running time: 6 minutes, 41 seconds
- Country: United States
- Language: English

The Unicorn in the Garden (also known as A Unicorn in the Garden) is a 1953 American United Productions of America (UPA) cartoon directed by William Hurtz. The cartoon is based on the 1939 short story with the same name by James Thurber. It was released on September 24, 1953.

In 1955, it was nominated for Best Animated Film at the British Academy Film Awards. In 1994, it was voted #48 of the 50 Greatest Cartoons of all time by a group of 1000 cartoon historians, animation professionals and film critics.

== Plot ==
One early morning, a husband enjoys breakfast while his wife sleeps upstairs. As he sits at the kitchen table, he glimpses a unicorn in the garden, nibbling on a rose. Intrigued, he steps outside to verify its existence and confirms it by touching its horn.

He hurriedly returns to the house and wakes his wife, exclaiming "There is a unicorn in the garden, eating roses!" She dismisses his claim with a skeptical expression, stating "The unicorn is a mythical beast". Disappointed, he returns to the garden and offers the unicorn a lily. Upon reentering the house, he announces, "The unicorn ate a lily". His wife responds, "You are a booby and I'm going to have you put into the booby hatch". He walks out angrily, saying "We'll see about that".

He returns to the garden, but the unicorn is gone. Meanwhile, his wife calls the police and a psychiatrist, saying she is "absolutely sure they are going to need a straitjacket". When the men arrive, she tells the doctor, "My husband saw a unicorn this morning".

The doctor motions for the nearby police officers to put the wife in the straitjacket. The husband walks back into the house, and the doctor asks if he told his wife he saw a unicorn. The husband replies, "Of course not, the unicorn is a mythical beast". The doctor instructs the officers to take the wife away and tells the husband, "I'm sorry, but your wife is crazy as a jay bird". As the doctor leaves, the husband slyly smiles.

The story ends with a moral: "Don't count your boobies until they are hatched".

== Cast ==
Uncredited voices:

- John Brown (husband / Dr. I. Ego the psychiatrist)
- Collen Collins (wife)

== Production and background ==
Director William Hurtz joined UPA after leaving the US Army Signal Corps. He worked with former Disney animators John Hubley and Stephen Bosustow as a layout artist on the 1950 Oscar winning animated cartoon, Gerald McBoing Boing.

In 1951, Time reported that UPA was going to produce an "eight-reel, 80-minute color film", that was based on James Thurber's writings and drawings. The project was going to combine animation and live action, and was provisionally titled Men, Women and Dogs, but funding for the feature proved to be elusive, and it was scrapped. Stephen Bosustow, the man behind the idea, then asked Hurtz to adapt one of Thuber's short stories instead. Hurtz chose The Unicorn in the Garden "because it featured human characters", and UPA was trying to "avoid the animal subjects" that were prevalent in Hollywood cartoons at the time. In order to be faithful to Thurber's "crude line-drawing style", Hurtz studied Thurber's work, remarking that "using color bothered me at first, but I thought if he ever got around to it, he probably would do it this way, as long as it was strongly linear". Hurtz assigned some work on the cartoon to the studio's least competent draftsmen, because he was after a "nice, lumpy look".

After completion, Bosustow was reportedly disappointed with the cartoon, and refused to enter it for Academy Award consideration. According to his daughter, Hurtz considered The Unicorn in the Garden his finest work.

== Musical score ==
David Raskin conducts chamber orchestra during scoring session for The Unicorn in the Garden, c. 1953.

The musical score, composed by David Raksin, was written before animation on the film began. Raskin described his score for the film as "rondoesque", and used, what he says is "the luxury of a six-piece orchestra". The small orchestra consisted of three string players, two wind soloists, accompanied by André Previn on the harpsichord. Raksin was originally going to play the alto recorder for the film's score, but quickly realized he couldn't both play and conduct. His appointed replacement had two days to familiarize himself with the instrument.

Mark Evans wrote in his book, Soundtrack: The Music of the Movies, that Raskin's score has a "decidedly neoclassic quality"; that he likes "canons, fugatos, and all types of polyphonic development". He described Raskin's musical score as "gentle, with a whimsical touch". He argues that Raskin's music makes a "subtle commentary" on the characters. For example, he says that the wife's "motifs tend to be brittle and unsympathetic", like she is portrayed in the cartoon, and in the scenes with the unicorn, a solo alto recorder is heard "in high register, playing a whimsical tune with a mock-martial air". Raksin said that "unicorns make you think of tapestries, where you saw the beast for the first time, and that leads to the Renaissance and to the sound of the alto recorder".

Jon Newsom, Chief of Music Division at the Library of Congress, also agrees that Raskin's score makes a commentary on the characters. He says that the use of the high soprano saxophone in the scenes with the wife, are "whining sounds and chromatic lines, that are not pretty", which "corresponds to the pathetic and sinister side of the wife's nature". He agrees with Raskin that the alto recorder is the "unicorn motif", and is "lyrical and diatonic". Newsom also noted that as the wife is taken away in a straitjacket by the police in the ending of the film, the "triumphant strains of Mendelssohn's Wedding March proclaim the husband's liberation".

After viewing the film, Thurber wrote a letter to Raskin, stating:

I am not a music maker, but I enjoyed your score, and remember with affection the recorder that spoke up when the unicorn appeared. It sounded exactly right for unicorns. A composer who can write music for unicorns has certainly done an ideal job!

— James Thruber

== Reception ==
Film critic Bosley Crowther described the cartoon as "artful, witty and deftly droll". American art critic Aline B. Louchheim opined that the cartoon showed "unswerving respect for the potentials and limitations of the medium [animated cartoons]". She went on to say that UPA cartoons "never try to imitate a photographic or artistically realistic, three-dimensional setting".

American writer Gilbert Seldes said that "the best way to identify the quality of the product is to say that every time you see one of their animated cartoons, you are likely to recapture the sensation you had when you first saw Steamboat Willie".

== Legacy ==
In 1955, it was nominated for Best Animated Film at the British Academy Film Awards. In 1994, it was voted number 48 on the list of the 50 Greatest Cartoons of all time, which were determined by a group of 1000 cartoon historians, animation professionals and film critics.

In 2012, it was released on a three disc DVD set as part of The Jolly Frolics Collection, which featured 38 UPA cartoons in total. The cartoons were digitally remastered, and the box set included audio commentary by Leonard Maltin and Jerry Beck.

== See also ==
- Golden age of American animation
- List of UPA cartoons

== Sources ==
- Beck, Jerry, ed. (1994). The 50 Greatest Cartoons: As Selected By 1,000 Animation Professionals. foreword by Chuck Jones (1st ed.). Atlanta, Georgia: Turner Publishing. ISBN 1-878685-49-X.
- Evans, Mark (1975). "Some Special Perspectives on Film Music". In Jacobs, Lewis (ed.). Soundtrack: The Music of the Movies. Cinema Studies. Introduction by Miklós Rózsa; drawings by Marc Nadel (1st ed.). New York: Hopkinson and Blake. ISBN 0-911974-19-9.
