= Winston Sharples filmography =

Filmography for Winston Sharples:

== 1933 ==
- The Last Mail
- The Fatal Note
- Pals
- Croon Crazy
- The Rasslin' Match

== 1934 ==
- Jest of Honor
- Sinister Stuff
- The Lion Tamer
- Jolly Good Felons
- Goode Knight
- Sultan Pepper
- How's Crops
- Wild Cargo
- A Royal Good Time
- Cubby's Stratosphere Flight
- Art for Art's Sake
- Mild Cargo
- Cactus King
- Fiddlin' Fun
- Grandfather's Clock
- Pastry Town Wedding
- Along Came a Duck
- Adventure Girl
- Little Bird Told Me
- The Parrotville Fire Department

== 1935 ==
- Chinese Lanterns
- The Sunshine Makers
- Parrotville Old Folks
- Japanese Lanterns
- Spinning Mice
- The Picnic Panic
- The Merry Kittens
- The Foxy Terrier
- Parrotville Post Office
- Hunters Are Coming
- Scotty Finds a Home
- Bird Scouts
- Molly Moo-Cow and the Indians
- Molly Moo-Cow and the Butterflies
- Fang and Claw
- Molly Moo-Cow and Rip Van Wrinkle

== 1936 ==
- Toonerville Trolley
- The Goose That Laid the Golden Egg
- Molly Moo Cow and Robinson Crusoe
- Neptune Nonsense
- Bold King Cole
- A Waif's Welcome
- Trolley Ahoy
- Cupid Gets his Man
- It's a Greek Life
- Toonerville Picnic

== 1938 ==
- Magie africaine

== 1940 ==
- Shakespearian Spinach
- Little Lambkin
- The Foul Ball Player
- Wimmen Is a Myskery
- The Ugly Dino
- Nurse-Mates
- Wedding Belts
- Fightin Pals
- Way Back When a Razzberry Was a Fruit
- Doing Impossikible Stunts
- The Fulla Bluff Man
- Wimmin Hadn't Oughta Drive
- Springtime in the Rock Age
- Popeye Meets William Tell
- My Pop, My Pop
- King for a Day
- Sneak, Snoop and Snitch
- The Constable
- Mommy Loves Puppy
- Bring Himself Back Alive

== 1941 ==
- All's Well
- Zero, the Hound
- Two for the Zoo
- Olive's $weep$take Ticket
- Twinkletoes Gets the Bird
- Swing Cleaning
- Raggedy Ann and Raggedy Andy
- Sneak, Snoop and Snitch in Triple Trouble
- Popeye Meets Rip Van Winkle
- Olive's Boithday Presink
- Gabby Goes Fishing
- Copy Cat
- The Wizard of Arts
- Pest Pilot
- It's a Hap-Hap-Happy Day
- Vitamin Hay
- I'll Never Crow Again
- Superman
- Mechanical Monsters
- Nix on Hypnotricks

== 1942 ==
- Billion Dollar Limited
- The Arctic Giant
- The Bulleteers
- The Raven
- Pip-eye, Pup-eye, Poop-eye an' Peep-eye
- Cactus Capers
- The Magnetic Telescope
- Olive Oyl and Water Don't Mix
- Many Tanks
- Electric Earthquake
- Volcano
- You're a Sap, Mr. Jap
- Terror on the Midway
- Alona on the Sarong Seas
- Japoteurs
- Showdown
- A Hull of a Mess
- Scrap the Japs
- Eleventh Hour
- Me Musical Nephews
- Destruction Inc.

== 1943 ==
- Spinach Fer Britain
- Seein' Red, White 'n' Blue
- The Mummy Strikes
- Too Weak to Work
- Jungle Drums
- A Jolly Good Furlough
- Ration Fer the Duration
- The Hungry Goat
- Happy Birthdaze
- Wood-Peckin'
- No Mutton for Nuttin'
- Her Honor the Mare
- The Marry-Go-Round

== 1944-68 ==
- 1944 : Henpecked Rooster
- 1944 : Hullaba-Lulu
- 1944 : Cilly Goose
- 1944 : Lulu Gets the Birdie
- 1944 : We're On Our Way to Rio
- 1944 : Suddenly It's Spring
- 1944 : Lulu in Hollywood
- 1944 : The Anvil Chorus Girl
- 1944 : Lucky Lulu
- 1944 : Spinach Packin' Popeye
- 1944 : I'm Just Curious
- 1944 : Moving Aweigh
- 1944 : Lulu's Indoor Outing
- 1944 : Yankee Doodle Donkey
- 1944 : She-Sick Sailors
- 1944 : Gabriel Churchkitten
- 1945 : Pop-Pie a la Mode
- 1945 : When G.I. Johnny Comes Home
- 1945 : Magica-Lulu
- 1945 : Tops in the Big Top
- 1945 : Scrappily Married
- 1945 : Beau Ties
- 1945 : Shape Ahoy
- 1945 : A Lamb in a Jam
- 1945 : Daffidilly Daddy
- 1945 : For Better or Nurse
- 1945 : Snap Happy
- 1945 : A Self-Made Mongrel
- 1945 : Mess Production
- 1945 : Man's Pest Friend
- 1946 : Bargain Counter Attack
- 1946 : Cheese Burglar
- 1946 : Bored of Education
- 1946 : House Tricks?
- 1946 : Service with a Guile
- 1946 : Loose in a Caboose
- 1946 : Klondike Casanova
- 1946 : Peep in the Deep
- 1946 : Old MacDonald Had a Farm
- 1946 : Sheep Shape
- 1946 : Rocket to Mars
- 1946 : Rodeo Romeo
- 1946 : Chick and Double Chick
- 1946 : Goal Rush
- 1946 : Sudden Fried Chicken
- 1946 : Spree for All
- 1947 : Musica-Lulu
- 1947 : The Fistic Mystic
- 1947 : The Island Fling
- 1947 : A Scout with the Gout
- 1947 : Stupidstitious Cat
- 1947 : Abusement Park
- 1947 : The Enchanted Square
- 1947 : I'll Be Skiing Ya
- 1947 : Madhattan Island
- 1947 : Much Ado About Mutton
- 1947 : Cad and Caddy
- 1947 : The Wee Men
- 1947 : The Mild West
- 1947 : The Royal Four-Flusher
- 1947 : Popeye and the Pirates
- 1947 : Naughty but Mice
- 1947 : Wotta Knight
- 1947 : A Bout with a Trout
- 1947 : Safari So Good
- 1947 : Super Lulu
- 1947 : The Baby Sitter
- 1947 : Santa's Surprise
- 1947 : All's Fair at the Fair
- 1947 : The Circus Comes to Clown
- 1948 : Cat o'Nine Tails
- 1948 : Olive Oyl for President
- 1948 : The Dog Show-Off
- 1948 : Flip-Flap
- 1948 : Little Brown Jug
- 1948 : Wigwam Whoopee
- 1948 : The Golden State
- 1948 : Winter Draws On
- 1948 : We're in the Honey
- 1948 : Pre-Hysterical Man
- 1948 : The Bored Cuckoo
- 1948 : There's Good Boos To-Night
- 1948 : Land of the Lost
- 1948 : Sing or Swim
- 1948 : Popeye Meets Hercules
- 1948 : Butterscotch and Soda
- 1948 : A Wolf in Sheik's Clothing
- 1948 : Camptown Races
- 1948 : Spinach vs Hamburgers
- 1948 : The Lone Star State
- 1948 : Snow Place Like Home
- 1948 : The Mite Makes Right
- 1948 : Readin', Writin', and Rhythmetic
- 1948 : Robin Hood-Winked
- 1948 : Hector's Hectic Life
- 1948 : The Old Shell Game
- 1948 : Symphony in Spinach
- 1949 : The Funshine State
- 1949 : The Little Cut-Up
- 1949 : Hep Cat Symphony
- 1949 : The Emerald Isle
- 1949 : Comin' Round the Mountain
- 1949 : The Lost Dream
- 1949 : Popeye's Premiere
- 1949 : Shortenin' Bread
- 1949 : Stork Market
- 1949 : Little Red Schoolmouse
- 1949 : Win, Place and Showboat
- 1949 : A-Haunting We Will Go
- 1949 : A Mutt in a Rut
- 1949 : Lumberjack and Jill
- 1949 : Spring Song
- 1949 : The Ski's the Limit
- 1949 : Hot Air Aces
- 1949 : Heap Hep Injuns
- 1949 : Campus Capers
- 1949 : Toys Will Be Toys
- 1949 : A Balmy Swami
- 1949 : Gobs of Fun
- 1949 : Farm Foolery
- 1949 : Tar with a Star
- 1949 : Our Funny Finny Friends
- 1949 : Silly Hillbilly
- 1949 : Marriage Wows
- 1949 : Boos in the Night
- 1949 : The Big Flame Up
- 1949 : Leprechaun's Gold
- 1949 : Barking Dogs Don't Fite
- 1949 : Strolling Thru the Park
- 1949 : Song of the Birds
- 1949 : The Big Drip
- 1949 : Snow Foolin'
- 1949 : The Fly's Last Flight
- 1950 : Mice Meeting You
- 1950 : Land of the Lost Jewels
- 1950 : Blue Hawaii
- 1950 : How Green Is My Spinach
- 1950 : Detouring Thru Maine
- 1950 : Quack-a-Doodle Do
- 1950 : Teacher's Pest
- 1950 : Gym Jam
- 1950 : Beach Peach
- 1950 : Jingle, Jangle, Jungle
- 1950 : Tarts and Flowers
- 1950 : Ups an' Downs Derby
- 1950 : Jitterbug Jive
- 1950 : Pleased to Eat You
- 1950 : Popeye Makes a Movie
- 1950 : Goofy Goofy Gander
- 1950 : Helter Swelter
- 1950 : Saved by the Bell
- 1950 : Baby Wants Spinach
- 1950 : Cassino to Korea
- 1950 : Quick on the Vigor
- 1950 : Voice of the Turkey
- 1950 : Casper's Spree Under the Sea
- 1950 : Riot in Rhythm
- 1950 : Fresh Yeggs
- 1950 : Fiesta Time
- 1950 : The Farmer and the Belle
- 1950 : Once Upon a Rhyme
- 1950 : Sock-a-Bye Kitty
- 1951 : One Quack Mind
- 1951 : Vacation with Play
- 1951 : Tweet Music
- 1951 : Mice Paradise
- 1951 : Boo Hoo Baby
- 1951 : Drippy Mississippi
- 1951 : Thrill of Fair
- 1951 : Hold the Lion Please
- 1951 : Land of Lost Watches
- 1951 : Miners Forty-Niners
- 1951 : Alpine for You
- 1951 : As the Crow Lies
- 1951 : Too Boo or Not to Boo
- 1951 : Double-Cross-Country Race
- 1951 : Sing Again of Michigan
- 1951 : Slip Us Some Redskin
- 1951 : Pilgrim Popeye
- 1951 : Boo Scout
- 1951 : Party Smarty
- 1951 : Casper Comes to Clown
- 1951 : Cat-Choo
- 1951 : Let's Stalk Spinach
- 1951 : Audrey the Rainmaker
- 1951 : Vegetable Vaudeville
- 1951 : Cat Tamale
- 1951 : Punch and Judo
- 1951 : Casper Takes a Bow-Wow
- 1951 : By Leaps and Hounds
- 1951 : Scout Fellow
- 1952 : Snooze Reel
- 1952 : Popeye's Pappy
- 1952 : Deep Boo Sea
- 1952 : Off We Glow
- 1952 : Lunch with a Punch
- 1952 : Cat Carson Rides Again
- 1952 : Ghost of the Town
- 1952 : The Awful Tooth
- 1952 : Fun at the Fair
- 1952 : Swimmer Take All
- 1952 : Law and Audrey
- 1952 : Spunky Skunky
- 1952 : Friend or Phony
- 1952 : Dizzy Dinosaurs
- 1952 : City Kitty
- 1952 : Gag and Baggage
- 1952 : Cage Fright
- 1952 : Tots of Fun
- 1952 : Clown on the Farm
- 1952 : Popalong Popeye
- 1952 : Pig-a-Boo
- 1952 : Shuteye Popeye
- 1952 : Mice-capades
- 1952 : True Boo
- 1952 : Forest Fantasy
- 1952 : Big Bad Sindbad
- 1952 : The Case of the Cockeyed Canary
- 1952 : Feast and Furious
- 1953 : Hysterical History
- 1953 : Child Sockology
- 1953 : Ancient Fistory
- 1953 : Frightday the 13th
- 1953 : Of Mice and Magic
- 1953 : Starting from Hatch
- 1953 : Spook No Evil
- 1953 : Philharmaniacs
- 1953 : Winner by a Hare
- 1953 : Aero-Nutics
- 1953 : Herman the Catoonist
- 1953 : Popeye's Mirthday
- 1953 : North Pal
- 1953 : Better Bait Than Never
- 1953 : Toreadorable
- 1953 : Invention Convention
- 1953 : By the Old Mill Scream
- 1953 : Surf Bored
- 1953 : Baby Wants a Battle
- 1953 : No Place Like Rome
- 1953 : Firemen's Brawl
- 1953 : Little Boo-Peep
- 1953 : Drinks on the Mouse
- 1953 : Popeye, the Ace of Space
- 1953 : Little Audrey Riding Hood
- 1953 : Do or Diet
- 1953 : Shaving Muggs
- 1953 : Huey's Ducky Daddy
- 1953 : Northwest Mousie
- 1953 : Boos and Saddles
- 1954 : Floor Flusher
- 1954 : Boo Moon
- 1954 : The Seapreme Court
- 1954 : Crazy Town
- 1954 : Keep Your Grin Up
- 1954 : Surf and Sound
- 1954 : Penny Antics
- 1954 : Zero the Hero
- 1954 : Popeye's 20th Anniversary
- 1954 : Hare Today, Gone Tomorrow
- 1954 : Gift for Gag
- 1954 : Casper Genie
- 1954 : Taxi-Turvy
- 1954 : Candy Cabaret
- 1954 : Of Mice and Menace
- 1954 : Bride and Gloom
- 1954 : Puss 'n' Boos
- 1954 : Car-azy Drivers
- 1954 : The Oily Bird
- 1954 : Greek Mirthology
- 1954 : Ship A-Hooey
- 1954 : Fright to the Finish
- 1954 : Boos and Arrows
- 1954 : Fido Beta Kappa
- 1954 : Private Eye Popeye
- 1954 : Rail Rodents
- 1954 : Boo Ribbon Winner
- 1954 : A Job for a Gob
- 1954 : Gopher Spinach
- 1954 : No Ifs, and or Butts
- 1955 : Cookin' with Gags
- 1955 : Hide and Shriek
- 1955 : Dizzy Dishes
- 1955 : Nurse to Meet Ya
- 1955 : Robin Rodenthood
- 1955 : Git Along Li'l Duckie
- 1955 : Bicep Built for Two
- 1955 : Beaus Will Be Beaus
- 1955 : Spooking with a Brogue
- 1955 : News Hound
- 1955 : Poop Goes the Weasel
- 1955 : Bull Fright
- 1955 : Mouse Trapeze
- 1955 : Rabbit Punch
- 1955 : Mister and Mistletoe
- 1955 : Red White and Boo
- 1955 : Cops Is Tops
- 1955 : Mousieur Herman
- 1955 : Boo Kind to Animals
- 1955 : Kitty Cornered
- 1956 : Hill-billing and Cooing
- 1956 : Ground Hog Play
- 1956 : Mouseum
- 1956 : Sleuth But Sure
- 1956 : Popeye for President
- 1956 : Dutch Treat
- 1956 : Swab the Duck
- 1956 : Out to Punch
- 1956 : Penguin for Your Thoughts
- 1956 : Will Do Mousework
- 1956 : Assault and Flattery
- 1956 : Pedro and Lorenzo
- 1956 : Mousetro Herman
- 1956 : Insect to Injury
- 1956 : Line of Screammage
- 1956 : Parlez Vous Woo
- 1956 : Sir Irving and Jeames
- 1956 : Fright from Wrong
- 1956 : I Don't Scare
- 1956 : Hide and Peak
- 1956 : A Haul in One
- 1956 : Lion in the Roar
- 1957 : Spooking About Africa
- 1957 : Pest Pupil
- 1957 : Nearlyweds
- 1957 : Cat in the Act
- 1957 : Hooky Spooky
- 1957 : Fishing Tackler
- 1957 : The Crystal Brawl
- 1957 : Patriotic Popeye
- 1957 : Peek a Boo
- 1957 : Mr. Money Gags
- 1957 : Sky Scrappers
- 1957 : Spree Lunch
- 1957 : L'Amour the Merrier
- 1957 : Ghost of Honor
- 1957 : Spooky Swabs
- 1957 : From Made to Worse
- 1957 : Ice Scream
- 1957 : Possum Pearl
- 1957 : Jumping with Toy
- 1957 : Jolly the Clown
- 1957 : Boo Bop
- 1957 : One Funny Knight
- 1957 : Cock-a-Doodle Dino
- 1958 : Dante Dreamer
- 1958 : Heir Restorer
- 1958 : Sportickles
- 1958 : Spook and Span
- 1958 : Grateful Gus
- 1958 : Frighty Cat
- 1958 : Ghost Writers
- 1958 : Finnegan's Flea
- 1958 : Which Is Witch
- 1958 : Okey Dokey Donkey
- 1958 : Chew Chew Baby
- 1958 : Travelaffs
- 1958 : You Said a Mouseful
- 1958 : Good Scream Fun
- 1958 : Stork Raving Mad
- 1958 : Right Off the Bat
- 1958 : Dawg Gawn
- 1958 : Felix the Cat
- 1959 : Owly to Bed
- 1959 : Doing What's Fright
- 1959 : The Animal Fair
- 1959 : Fit to Be Toyed
- 1959 : Felineous Assault
- 1959 : La Petite Parade
- 1959 : Fun on Furlough
- 1959 : Houndabout
- 1959 : Huey's Father's Day
- 1959 : Down to Mirth
- 1959 : Not Ghoulty
- 1959 : Spooking of Ghosts
- 1959 : Casper's Birthday Party
- 1959 : Talking Horse Sense
- 1959 : Matty's Funday Funnies (TV series)
- 1959 : T.V. Fuddlehead
- 1959 : Katnip's Big Day
- 1959 : Out of This Whirl
- 1960 : Top Cat
- 1960 : Scouting for Trouble
- 1960 : Mike the Masquerader
- 1960 : Busy Buddies
- 1960 : The Boss Is Always Right
- 1960 : Be Mice to Cats
- 1960 : Fiddle Faddle
- 1960 : Trouble Date
- 1960 : From Dime to Dime
- 1960 : Trigger Treat
- 1960 : Monkey Doodles
- 1960 : Silly Science
- 1960 : Peck Your Own Home
- 1960 : The Shoe Must Go On
- 1960 : Turning the Fables
- 1960 : Shootin' Stars
- 1960 : Electronica
- 1960 : Counter Attack
- 1960 : Space Conditioning
- 1960 : Fine Feathered Fiend
- 1960 : Disguise the Limit
- 1960 : King Leonardo and His Short Subjects (TV series)
- 1960 : Planet Mouseola
- 1960 : Galaxia
- 1960 : Bouncing Benny
- 1961 : Terry the Terror
- 1961 : Northern Mites
- 1961 : Miceniks
- 1961 : Phantom Moustacher
- 1961 : The Lion's Busy
- 1961 : The Kid from Mars
- 1961 : The Mighty Termite
- 1961 : Goodie, the Gremlin
- 1961 : Alvin's Solo Flight
- 1961 : In the Nicotine
- 1961 : Hound About That
- 1961 : Trick or Tree
- 1961 : The Inquisit Visit
- 1961 : Bopin' Hood
- 1961 : Cape Kidnaveral
- 1961 : Munro
- 1961 : Cane and Able
- 1961 : Turtle Scoop
- 1961 : Kozmo Goes to School
- 1961 : The Plot Sickens
- 1962 : Without Time or Reason
- 1962 : Perry Popgun
- 1962 : Home Sweet Swampy
- 1962 : Hi Fi Jinx
- 1962 : Frog's Legs
- 1962 : Crumley Cogwheel
- 1962 : Popcorn and Politics
- 1962 : Good and Guilty
- 1962 : TV or Not TV
- 1962 : Giddy Gadgets
- 1962 : Funderful Suburbia
- 1962 : Cool Cat Blues
- 1962 : Psychological Testing
- 1962 : Hero's Reward
- 1962 : Snuffy's Song
- 1962 : The Hat
- 1962 : A Tree Is a Tree Is a Tree?
- 1962 : The Method and Maw
- 1962 : Koko Meets Boobnik (TV)
- 1962 : Koko Gottum Injun Trouble (TV)
- 1962 : Balloon Blues (TV)
- 1962 : Take Me to Your Gen'rul
- 1962 : Keeping Up with Krazy
- 1962 : Et Tu Otto
- 1962 : The Refriger-raider (TV)
- 1962 : Pow-wow-wow! (TV)
- 1962 : Polar Bear Facts (TV)
- 1962 : Now You See It Now You Don't (TV)
- 1962 : The Mystery Guest (TV)
- 1962 : Mean Moe Means Well (TV)
- 1962 : Love in Bloom (TV)
- 1962 : Kokonut, Private Eye (TV)
- 1962 : Knight Work (TV)
- 1962 : Flying Saucery (TV)
- 1962 : The Egg and Me (TV)
- 1962 : Baby Face (TV)
- 1962 : Yule Laff
- 1962 : Penny Pals
- 1962 : Mouse Blanche
- 1962 : Robot Ringer
- 1962 : It's for the Birdies
- 1962 : Which Witch Is Which? (TV)
- 1962 : Whale of a Story (TV)
- 1962 : TV or Not TV (TV)
- 1962 : That's Show Biz (TV)
- 1962 : Success Story (TV)
- 1962 : Reflection Land (TV)
- 1962 : A Queen for a Day (TV)
- 1962 : Mummy's the Word (TV)
- 1962 : Moving Madness (TV)
- 1962 : Mean Moe Takes Over (TV)
- 1962 : Mean Moe's Money Mad (TV)
- 1962 : Koko Roams in Rome (TV)
- 1962 : Koko Meets Robin Hood (TV)
- 1962 : In the Army (TV)
- 1962 : Gigantical (TV)
- 1962 : A Fishy Story (TV)
- 1962 : Fastest Popgun in the West (TV)
- 1962 : Comic Strip (TV)
- 1962 : Bluebeard's Treasure (TV)
- 1962 : The Big Bank Robbery (TV)
- 1962 : A-Haunting We Will Go (TV)
- 1962 : One of the Family
- 1962 : Fiddlin' Around
- 1963 : Ringading Kid
- 1963 : Ollie the Owl
- 1963 : The New Casper Cartoon Show (TV series)
- 1963 : Wild West Story (TV)
- 1963 : So Long Ceylon (TV)
- 1963 : Rodeo (TV)
- 1963 : On with the Show (TV)
- 1963 : No Soap (TV)
- 1963 : Medicine Man (TV)
- 1963 : Mean Moe Rain Maker (TV)
- 1963 : Mad Scientist Gets Madder (TV)
- 1963 : Irving the Indian Nut (TV)
- 1963 : Good Snooze Tonight
- 1963 : Drum Up a Tenant
- 1963 : Strictly from Lumber (TV)
- 1963 : Station Breaks (TV)
- 1963 : Sing Along with Moe (TV)
- 1963 : The River Robbers (TV)
- 1963 : Pony Express (TV)
- 1963 : Plane Stupid (TV)
- 1963 : Make Room for Moe (TV)
- 1963 : The Invisible One (TV)
- 1963 : Footloose Fox (TV)
- 1963 : Extra Special Delivery (TV)
- 1963 : Enchanted Prince (TV)
- 1963 : A Dog Gone Snooper (TV)
- 1963 : Comic Book Capers (TV)
- 1963 : Arabian Daze (TV)
- 1963 : A Sight for Squaw Eyes
- 1963 : One Weak Vacation
- 1963 : Trash Program
- 1963 : You Are Here (TV)
- 1963 : Sold On Manhattan (TV)
- 1963 : Rocket Ranger (TV)
- 1963 : Moe Moves In (TV)
- 1963 : Mean Moe the Star (TV)
- 1963 : Mean Moe the Great (TV)
- 1963 : Mean Moe Gets the Bird (TV)
- 1963 : Mean Moe and Cleopatra (TV)
- 1963 : Koko Meets Barney Beatnik (TV)
- 1963 : Koko in a London Fog (TV)
- 1963 : Growing Pains (TV)
- 1963 : The Fan Letter (TV)
- 1963 : The Cliff Hanger (TV)
- 1963 : Blunder Down Under (TV)
- 1963 : Arty Party (TV)
- 1963 : Who's Napoleon? (TV)
- 1963 : The Unwashables (TV)
- 1963 : Tic Tac Moe (TV)
- 1963 : The Sleeping Beauty (TV)
- 1963 : Sahara Today Gone Tomorrow (TV)
- 1963 : Romance Machine Made (TV)
- 1963 : Musketeer Moe (TV)
- 1963 : Mean Moe the Lion Tamer (TV)
- 1963 : Mean Moe Tells William Tell (TV)
- 1963 : Mean Moe's Fairy Tale (TV)
- 1963 : Mean Moe Day (TV)
- 1963 : A Lot of Bull (TV)
- 1963 : Let George Do It (TV)
- 1963 : Jungle Bungle (TV)
- 1963 : The Hillbillies (TV)
- 1963 : Having a Hex of a Time (TV)
- 1963 : Gone Hollywood (TV)
- 1963 : Funnyland (TV)
- 1963 : Fearless Female (TV)
- 1963 : Bomb-y Weather (TV)
- 1963 : Achilles Is a Heel (TV)
- 1963 : Beetle Bailey and His Friends (TV series)
- 1963 : Krazy Kat (TV series)
- 1963 : Harry Happy
- 1963 : Gramps to the Rescue
- 1963 : Tell Me a Bedtime Story
- 1963 : Sour Gripes
- 1963 : The Pig's Feat
- 1963 : Hound for Hound
- 1963 : Hobo's Holiday
- 1963 : Speak for Yourself Mean Moe (TV)
- 1963 : Mean Moe's Side Show (TV)
- 1963 : Mean Moe Cools Off (TV)
- 1963 : Mayor Mean Moe (TV)
- 1963 : Down to Earth (TV)
- 1963 : The Sheepish Wolf
- 1963 : Hiccup Hound
- 1963 : Muggy-Doo Boycat
- 1964 : Whiz Quiz Kid
- 1964 : Goodie Good Deed
- 1964 : Panhandling on Madison Avenue
- 1964 : Sailing Zero
- 1964 : Fizzicle Fizzle
- 1964 : Fix That Clock
- 1964 : Service with a Smile
- 1964 : Robot Rival
- 1964 : The Once Over
- 1964 : Laddy and His Lamp
- 1964 : A Friend in Tweed
- 1964 : Ocean Bruise
- 1964 : Highway Slobbery
- 1964 : Call Me a Taxi
- 1964 : Hip Hip Ole
- 1964 : Accidents Will Happen
- 1964 : Shoeflies
- 1964 : Getting Ahead
- 1964 : The Bus Way to Travel
- 1964 : And So Tibet
- 1965 : The Story of George Washington
- 1965 : Reading, Writhing, and Rithmetic
- 1965 : Near-Sighted and Far Out
- 1965 : A Leak in the Dike
- 1965 : A Tiger's Tail
- 1965 : Homer on the Range
- 1965 : Cagey Business
- 1965 : Inferior Decorator
- 1965 : A Hair-Raising Tale
- 1965 : Poor Little Witch Girl
- 1965 : The Itch
- 1965 : Solitary Refinement
- 1965 : Milton the Monster (TV series)
- 1965 : Tally Hokum
- 1965 : The Outside Dope
- 1966 : Two by Two
- 1966 : Trick or Cheat
- 1966 : Throne for a Loss
- 1966 : The Space Squid
- 1966 : Potions and Notions
- 1966 : Les Boys
- 1966 : From Nags to Witches
- 1966 : The Defiant Giant
- 1966 : Baggin' the Dragon
- 1966 : Alter Egotist
- 1966 : I Want My Mummy
- 1966 : Space Kid
- 1966 : Sick Transit
- 1966 : Op, Pop, Wham, and Bop
- 1966 : A Wedding Knight
- 1966 : A Balmy Knight
- 1966 : Geronimo and Son
- 1967 : Think or Sink
- 1967 : High But Not Dry
- 1967 : Halt, Who Grows There?
- 1967 : From Orbit to Obit
- 1967 : Forget-Me-Nuts
- 1967 : Clean Sweep
- 1967 : Brother Bat
- 1967 : Blacksheep Blacksmith
- 1967 : My Daddy the Astronaut
- 1967 : The Trip
- 1967 : The Squaw Path
- 1967 : The Plumber
- 1967 : Robin Hoodwinked
- 1967 : The Stuck-Up Wolf
- 1967 : The Stubborn Cowboy
- 1967 : A Bridge Grows in Brooklyn
- 1967 : Batfink: This Is Your Life (TV)
- 1967 : The Opera Caper
- 1967 : Marvin Digs
- 1967 : The Mini Squirts
- 1967 : Keep the Cool Baby
- 1967 : Mouse Trek
- 1968 : The Go-Go Gophers (TV series)
- 2004 : Felix the Cat Saves Christmas (video)
