= Marc Weiner =

American comedian (born 1955)

- Born: 1952 (age 73–74); Queens, New York City, U.S.
- Occupations: Comedian; puppeteer; television producer
- Years active: 1970s–present
- Children: 4

Marc Weiner (/ˈwiːnər/; born 1952) is an American comedian, puppeteer, and actor. He is best known for performing with his "head puppets", small puppet bodies in which an actor would stick their head through a hole at the top of the puppet's head. He hosted the Nickelodeon show Weinerville from 1993 to 1996. Weiner is also known for his roles as the Map and Swiper the Fox on the Nick Jr. show Dora the Explorer.

== Early and personal life ==
Weiner was born in Queens, New York City and raised in Mahopac, New York, to a Conservative Jewish family. His father owned a plumbing supplies company in Yorktown Heights, New York. He went to Hebrew school as a child and would often entertain his classmates by doing slapstick which would get him in trouble. Weiner struggled with dyslexia in school, which made him feel isolated. As a child, Weiner was diagnosed with Legg–Calvé–Perthes disease, affecting his bones, requiring him to use crutches. Weiner attended Monmouth College, where he opened a coffee shop, dropping out in 1971. He later became a weekend cook's mate on the Hudson River Sloop Clearwater, where he would entertain children, eventually earning his captain's license. Weiner later moved to Maine, where he studied at the Celebration Mime School. He lived in New Jersey at one point.

Weiner became Orthodox Jewish in the 1980s after having an epiphany about his Jewish identity. He studied Judaism and attended Lincoln Square Synagogue. He identifies as Modern Orthodox.

Weiner was married to Sandra (née Rosenblatt), however the couple divorced. They have 4 children, one of whom is deceased.

== Career ==
Weiner began his career as a street performer, collaborating with Robin Williams, and an improv comic who performed at Comic Strip Live, Catch A Rising Star, and the Comedy Cellar in the late-1970s. In 1981, he was a writer and occasional actor on Saturday Night Live. Around this time, he made an appearance on the Bizarre show with his puppet show Rockin Rocko and Tony.

Weiner wrote and hosted a children's television show called Weinerville, which ran on Nickelodeon from 1993 to 1997. He also co-hosted the east-coast portion of the 1994 Nickelodeon Kids' Choice Awards.

In 1998, Weiner made a guest appearance as himself in "Terminal", an episode of Cartoon Network/Adult Swim's Space Ghost Coast to Coast.

Since the cancellation of Weinerville, he has provided the voices of several characters on the Nick Jr. shows Dora the Explorer, Go, Diego, Go!, and Dora and Friends: Into the City!, including Map, Fiesta Trio and Swiper the Fox, and starred in the show Wordville, also on Nick Jr. In the UK, he starred in "Trebor Mighty Mints" commercials. Weiner also provided the voice of “The Map” in the 2019 film adaptation Dora and the Lost City of Gold.

On an episode of Ned's Declassified School Survival Guide, Weiner appeared as Ned's substitute teacher from elementary school. On an episode of Brotherly Love, he appeared (as himself) as a client needing the Romans to customize his truck while putting on a small show with his puppets.

Weiner is the founder of the Empathy Labyrinth organization, which runs workshops emphasizing empathy. It is based out of Stamford, Connecticut.

After becoming Orthodox, for stand up comedy sets, Weiner performs exclusively for Jewish organizations, synagogues, private parties and fundraisers. He also does not perform on Shabbat.

== Filmography ==
=== Film ===
Year	Title	Role	Notes
2002	Nick Jr. Holiday	Map, Swiper, Fiesta Trio	Direct-to-video; voice
2005	Dora the Explorer: Dance to the Rescue	Map, Swiper, Fiesta Trio	Direct-to-video; voice
2019	Dora and the Lost City of Gold	Map	Voice
2023	Dora and the Fantastical Creatures	Swiper	Short film; voice

=== Television ===
Year	Title	Role	Notes
1981–1982	Saturday Night Live	Rocko Weineretto, Weindulah	3 episodes
1989	The Jim Henson Hour	Rocko, Himself	"First Show/Miss Piggy's Hollywood"
1993–1994	Weinerville	Host	68 episodes
1993	Nick New Year's Eve	Dottie	Television film
1994	Nick New Year's '95	Dottie, Boney, Zip	Television film
1994	The Weinerville New Year's Special: Lost in the Big Apple	Boney, Captain Bob, Cocktail Frank	Television film
1995	The Weinerville Chanukah Special	Boney, Cocktail Frank, Dottie	Television film
1996	The Weinerville Election Special: From Washington B.C.	Dottie, Boney, Socko	Television film
2000–2019	Dora the Explorer	Swiper, Map, Fiesta Trio	140 episodes
2006	Ned's Declassified School Survival Guide	Mr. Weiner	Episode: "Substitute Teachers and the New Kid"
2006–2009	Go, Diego, Go!	Map, additional voices	3 episodes
2008	Dora Saves the Snow Princess	Map, Swiper, Fiesta Trio	Television film
2014	Dora and Friends: Into the City!	Map, Swiper, additional voices	9 episodes
2024	Dora	Swiper	

=== Video games ===
Year	Title	Role
2002	Dora the Explorer: Backpack Adventure	Map, Swiper
2002	Dora the Explorer: Lost City Adventure	Map, Swiper
2003	Dora the Explorer: Barnyard Buddies	Map, Swiper
2005	Dora the Explorer: Dance to the Rescue	Map, Swiper, King's Mother
2005	Dora the Explorer: Journey to the Purple Planet	Map, Swiper, Flinky
2006	Dora the Explorer: Dora's World Adventure	Map
2007	Dora the Explorer: Dora Saves the Mermaids	Map, Swiper
2008	Dora the Explorer: Dora Saves the Snow Princess	Map, Swiper
2009	Dora the Explorer: Dora Saves the Crystal Kingdom	Map
2010	Dora the Explorer: Dora's Big Birthday Adventure	Map
