= Jolly Frolics =

Animated film series

Jolly Frolics is a UPA animated cartoon series. Thirty-nine films were produced in the series, theatrically released from 1949 to 1959, pioneering the use of limited animation.

Some of these cartoons have aired on television in the package series Totally Tooned In. They were released on DVD by TCM in 2012 with a MOD re-release in 2014.

== Filmography ==
 Key:
- fc = features The Fox and the Crow characters
- g = features Gerald McBoing-Boing characters
- hh = features Hattie and Ham characters
- m = features Mr. Magoo characters
- The Ragtime Bear 9/8/49 m
- Punchy De Leon 1/12/50 fc
- Spellbound Hound 3/16/50 m
- The Miner's Daughter 5/25/50
- Giddyap 7/27/50
- Gerald McBoing-Boing 11/2/50 g
- The Popcorn Story 11/30/50
- The Family Circus 1/25/51
- Georgie and the Dragon 9/27/51
- The Wonder Gloves 11/29/51
- The Oompahs 1/24/52
- Rooty Toot Toot 3/27/52
- Willie the Kid 6/26/52
- Pete Hothead 9/25/52
- Madeline 11/27/52
- Little Boy With a Big Horn 3/26/53
- The Emperor's New Clothes 4/30/53
- Christopher Crumpet 6/25/53
- Gerald McBoing-Boing's Symphony 7/5/53 g Sparky
- The Unicorn in the Garden 9/24/53
- The Tell Tale Heart 12/27/53
- Bringing Up Mother 1/14/54
- Ballet-Oop 2/11/54
- The Man on the Flying Trapeze 4/8/54
- Fudget's Budget 6/17/54
- How Now Boing Boing 9/9/54 g
- Spare the Child 1/27/55
- Four Wheels No Brakes 3/24/55
- Baby Boogie 5/19/55
- Christopher Crumpet's Playmate 9/8/55
- The Rise of Duton Lang 12/1/55
- Gerald McBoing! Boing! On Planet Moo 2/9/56 g
- The Jaywalker 5/31/56
- Trees and Jamaica Daddy 1/30/58 hh
- Sailing and Village Band 2/27/58 hh
- Spring and Saganaki 10/16/58 hh
- Picnics Are Fun and Dino's Serenade 1/16/59 hh

== See also ==
- List of UPA cartoons
- Color Rhapsodies
- Phantasies
- Silly Symphony
- Color Classics
- Happy Harmonies
- Looney Tunes
- Merrie Melodies
- Puppetoons
