= Boris Kremenliev =

Composer and academic (b. 1911, d. 1988)

Boris Kremenliev (1911–1988) was a Bulgarian-American composer and professor of ethnomusicology at UCLA.

== Early life ==
He emigrated from his native Bulgaria in 1929. Kremenliev studied at DePaul University and later the University of Rochester, where he earned his doctorate in 1942. He served in the U.S. Army.

== Career ==
He joined the Music Department at UCLA and remained there until his retirement in 1978. Kremenliev mainly composed and wrote Slavic folk music. His Bulgarian-Macedonian Folk Music (UC Press 1952) is his best-known scholarly work, and the only book on the subject written in English. This book is included in over 342 WorldCat libraries:

One of his best known compositions is the film score for the 1953 film The Tell-Tale Heart, which was nominated for an Academy Award in its category that year. He performed with orchestras around the world, including the Stuttgart Philharmonic, the Orchestra of Mexico City, the symphony orchestras of Sydney and Melbourne, and the Sofia Philharmonic. A recent ASCAP survey noted performances in England, France, Germany, Italy, Poland and East Africa.

Kremenliev began as a part-time lecturer at UCLA in 1947. He served twice as Acting Director of the UCLA Institute of Ethnomusicology at UCLA. He created and presented a radio program for KPFK, the Many Musics of Man. Through this program, he raised the profile of ethnomusicology within the local community by presenting aspects of world music. In his radio show, Kremenliev invited distinguished guests to participate in discussion. After the institute was dissolved, Kremenliev became Chair of the Council on Ethnomusicology and paved the way for the new Department of Ethnomusicology, which launched on July 1, 1988.

As a member of ASCAP and the Screen Composers Association of the U.S., he interpreted for visiting musicians in Los Angeles. Kremenliev met many distinguished composers, including Pierre Boulez, Elliot Carter, Carlos Chavez, Aaron Copland, Luigi Dallapiccola, Roy Harris, Ulysses Kay, Ernst Krenek, Luigi Nono, Harry Partch, Arnold Schoenberg, Dmitri Shostakovitch, William Grant Still, Karlheinz Stockhausen, Igor Stravinsky, Toch, Vaughan Williams and William Walton.

Kremenliev designed the recording studio in Schoenberg Auditorium, for which he specified all the equipment and supervised its installation.
