= List of Mr. Magoo cartoons =

This is a list of UPA theatrical cartoons featuring Mr. Magoo. Most of the films listed were distributed by Columbia Pictures, but the final three (Magoo Meets Boing-Boing, Magoo Meets Frankenstein, and I Was a Teenage Magoo) were distributed by UPA themselves.

== Cartoons ==
Directors are given for each short.

=== 1949 ===
- The Ragtime Bear (John Hubley) (Note: Jolly Frolics cartoon starring Mr. Magoo)

=== 1950 ===
- Spellbound Hound (Pete Burness)
- Trouble Indemnity (Burness) (Note: Mr. Magoo cartoon which was nominated for the Academy Award for Best Short Subject (Cartoons))
- Bungled Bungalow (Burness)

=== 1951 ===
- Barefaced Flatfoot (Hubley)
- Fuddy Duddy Buddy (Hubley)
- Grizzly Golfer (Burness)

=== 1952 ===
- Sloppy Jalopy (Burness)
- The Dog Snatcher (Burness)
- Pink and Blue Blues (Burness)
- Hotsy Footsy (William Hurtz)
- Captains Outrageous (Burness)

=== 1953 ===
(all cartoons directed by Pete Burness)

- Safety Spin
- Magoo's Masterpiece
- Magoo Slept Here

=== 1954 ===
(all cartoons directed by Pete Burness)

- Magoo Goes Skiing
- Kangaroo Courting
- Destination Magoo
- When Magoo Flew (Note: Mr. Magoo cartoon which won for the Academy Award for Best Short Subject (Cartoons)) (Note: Mr. Magoo cartoon produced in CinemaScope)

=== 1955 ===
(all cartoons directed by Pete Burness)

- Magoo's Check-Up
- Magoo's Express
- Madcap Magoo
- Stage Door Magoo
- Magoo Makes News

=== 1956 ===
(all cartoons directed by Pete Burness)

- Magoo's Canine Mutiny
- Magoo Goes West
- Calling Doctor Magoo
- Magoo Beats the Heat
- Magoo's Puddle Jumper
- Trailblazer Magoo
- Magoo's Problem Child
- Meet Mother Magoo

=== 1957 ===
- Magoo Goes Overboard (Burness)
- Matador Magoo (Burness)
- Magoo Breaks Par (Burness)
- Magoo's Glorious Fourth (Burness)
- Magoo's Masquerade (Rudy Larriva)
- Magoo Saves the Bank (Burness)
- Rock Hound Magoo (Burness)
- Magoo's Moose Hunt (Robert Cannon)
- Magoo's Private War (Larriva)

=== 1958 ===
- Magoo's Young Manhood (Burness)
- Scoutmaster Magoo (Cannon)
- The Explosive Mr. Magoo (Burness)
- Magoo's Three-Point Landing (Burness)
- Magoo's Cruise (Larriva)
- Love Comes to Magoo (Tom McDonald)
- Gumshoe Magoo (Gil Turner)

=== 1959 ===
- Bwana Magoo (McDonald)
- Magoo's Homecoming (Turner)
- Merry Minstrel Magoo (Larriva)
- Magoo's Lodge Brother (Larriva)
- Terror Faces Magoo (Jack Goodford, Chris Ishii)
- 1001 Arabian Nights (Jack Kinney) (Note: Mr. Magoo feature-length movie)
- Magoo Meets Boing Boing (The Noise-Making Boy) (Abe Levitow)

=== 1960 ===
- Magoo Meets Frankenstein (Levitow, Turner)
- I Was a Teenage Magoo (Clyde Geronimi)
