= The Tell-Tale Heart (1953 American film) =

1953 American horror animated short film

- Promotional poster
- Directed by: Ted Parmelee
- Screenplay by: Bill Scott; Fred Grable
- Based on: The Tell-Tale Heart by Edgar Allan Poe
- Produced by: Stephen Bosustow
- Narrated by: James Mason
- Music by: Boris Kremenliev
- Production company: United Productions of America
- Distributed by: Columbia Pictures
- Release date: December 17, 1953
- Running time: 7:24 minutes
- Country: United States
- Language: English

The Tell-Tale Heart is a 1953 American adult animated psychological horror short film produced by UPA, directed by Ted Parmelee, and narrated by James Mason. The screenplay by Bill Scott and Fred Grable is based on the 1843 short story of the same name by Edgar Allan Poe. The British Board of Film Censors made this the first cartoon to receive an adults-only X certificate in the United Kingdom.

== Plot ==
A murderer's increasing guilt leads him to believe he can hear his victim's heart still beating beneath the floorboards where he buried him. Seen through the eyes of the nameless narrator, the surrealistic images help convey his descent into madness.

== Production ==
Paul Julian served as both designer and color artist for film, and Pat Matthews was the principal animator.

In May 1953, pre-production started on The Tell-Tale Heart, which originally was intended to be a 3-D film. It is not known if the film was animated in this fashion, but it was not released in 3D. There is no reference to 3D in a technical trade review. Furthermore, the leaders on original prints of the film do not indicate it ever was part of a pair of 3D prints.

== Reception ==
The film was the first cartoon to be rated X, indicating it was suitable only for adult audiences, by the British Board of Film Censors. It was nominated for the Academy Award for Best Animated Short Film but lost to Toot, Whistle, Plunk and Boom from Walt Disney Productions.

In 1994, animation historian Jerry Beck surveyed 1000 people working in the animation industry and published the results in The 50 Greatest Cartoons: As Selected by 1,000 Animation Professionals, in which The Tell-Tale Heart ranked #24.

In 2001, the United States Library of Congress deemed the film "culturally significant" and selected it for preservation in the National Film Registry.

== Availability ==
The short is included as a bonus feature on the first DVD release of Hellboy. It is also included, with commentary by Leonard Maltin and Jerry Beck, on disc 2 of The Jolly Frolics Collection.
