= 1963 in television =

The year 1963 involved some significant events in television. Below are lists of notable TV-related events.

== Events ==
- January 1 – Osamu Tezuka's Tetsuwan Atomu (Astro Boy), Japan's first serialized animated series based on the popular manga, is broadcast for the first time, on the Japanese television station Fuji Television.
- January 3 – Walter Bruch unveils the PAL standard to the European Broadcasting Union.
- January 13 – BBC Television broadcasts the play Madhouse on Castle Street in the Sunday-Night Theatre series. The play co-stars a young American folk music singer named Bob Dylan.
- March 12 – Television broadcasts begin in the Nakhichevan ASSR (present-day Nakhchivan Autonomous Republic within Azerbaijan) with the launch of Nakhchivan TV.
- April 1 – German terrestrial channel ZDF (pronounced tseht-day-ehf) begins broadcasting.
- April 15 - Three months after the first test broadcast, Television Singapura Channel 5 (now Mediacorp Channel 5) signs on as Singapore's first TV station.
- May 15 – First television pictures transmitted from a US crewed space capsule ("Faith 7"). Due to the poor picture quality, only NBC carries the transmission, and on tape-delay, not live.
- July 8 – The English comedy sketch Dinner for One with Freddie Frinton, having been shown live on Peter Frankenfeld's show GutenAbend in 1962, is recorded in English by Norddeutscher Rundfunk before an audience at the Theater am Besenbinderhof, Hamburg, West Germany. Regularly repeated on New Year's Eve in Germany and elsewhere, it is not seen in its entirety on British television until 2018.
- July 22 – Bob Crane quits his DJ job at radio station KNX to become a regular on The Donna Reed Show after dividing time between the Screen Gems TV show and the CBS Radio affiliate. Crane had been a top five morning drive radio DJ since the mid-1950s in the Los Angeles market.
- August 28 – Civil rights leader Martin Luther King Jr. delivers his I Have a Dream speech which is covered by major American networks.
- September 2 – CBS Evening News becomes network television's first half-hour weeknight news broadcast, when the show is lengthened from 15 to 30 minutes.
- September 9 – One week later, NBC also expands its evening network news program, The Huntley-Brinkley Report, to 30 minutes.
- September 27 – The Littlest Hobo makes its debut on TV across North America with the first episode entitled "Blue Water Sailor".
- September 29 – The Judy Garland Show makes its debut on CBS, which later got cancelled in 1964 after one season (due to competition with the ever popular NBC western Bonanza airing in the same time slot).
- September 30 – BBC Television begins using a globe as its symbol. They will continue to use it in varying forms until 2002.
- October 1 – ABC News at last drops its dependence on outside sources of news film and begins to rely on its own camera crews.
- October 14 − ABC affiliate WGHP in High Point, North Carolina signs on the air.
- November 22 – All three major U.S. networks suspends programming for four days following the news of the assassination of John F. Kennedy. The pre-emptions unofficially begin a few minutes after President Kennedy is shot: on the top-rated American soap opera As the World Turns, Nancy Hughes (Helen Wagner) is in the middle of a discussion with Grandpa (Santos Ortega) about Bob's (Don Hastings) decision to invite Lisa (Eileen Fulton) to Thanksgiving dinner when Walter Cronkite interrupts Wagner mid-speech to deliver the bulletin. As the World Turns continues for one more scene (at this time, the show is transmitted live) before Cronkite cuts in permanently. News of the assassination, and later the funeral procession, are the first television broadcasts across the Pacific Ocean (via Relay 1 satellite).
- November 23 – On BBC Television in the United Kingdom:
  - William Hartnell stars as the First Doctor in the very first episode of science fiction series Doctor Who (first of the 4-part serial An Unearthly Child). So many people complain of having missed it (because of the disruption to schedules caused by the assassination of John F. Kennedy) that the following Saturday episode 1 is repeated before the broadcast of episode 2. Doctor Who runs until 1989 and is revived from 2005.
  - That Was the Week That Was broadcasts a serious Kennedy tribute episode.
- November 24 – Jack Ruby murders John F. Kennedy's suspected assassin Lee Harvey Oswald live on television.
- November 25 – All major American networks cover the state funeral of John F. Kennedy.
- November 26 - All regularly scheduled television programming resumed in the United States, after having been preempted since Friday afternoon for news coverage of, and tributes to, the late President Kennedy. National network broadcasting of entertainment programs began at 8:00 a.m. Eastern time with Captain Kangaroo on CBS, then local programs on ABC at 10:00, and the game show Say When!! on NBC, also at 10:00.
- November 28 - CBS' Huntsville television station WHNT begins on the air.
- December 7 – Instant replay is used for the first time during the live transmission of the Army–Navy Game by its inventor, director Tony Verna.
- December 28 – The launch of television broadcasting service in Malaysia, TV Malaysia, as predecessor of RTM TV1, member of Radio Televisyen Malaysia in Kuala Lumpur, presided by government leaders from studios in Ampang Road in the capital.
- In Blanchard, North Dakota, construction on the KTHI TV transmitter mast (now KVLY-TV) was completed. Upon completion, its height of 2,063 ft (629m) made it the tallest structure in the world until 1966, when the nearby KXJB-TV mast (now KRDK) was completed. It still stands today, but at 1,987 ft tall due to an FCC spectrum repack.
- For the first time, most Americans say that they get more of their news from television than newspapers.
- The television remote control is authorized by the FCC.

== Programs/programmes ==
- ABC's Wide World of Sports (1961–98)
- American Bandstand (1952–89)
- Armchair Theatre (1956–68)
- As the World Turns (1956–2010)
- Ben Casey (1961–66)
- Blue Peter (UK) (1958–present)
- Bonanza (1959–73)
- Bozo the Clown (1949–present)
- Candid Camera (1948–2004)
- Captain Kangaroo (1955–1984)
- Combat! (1962–67)
- Come Dancing (UK) (1949–95)
- Coronation Street, UK (1960–present)
- Death Valley Days (1952–75)
- Dixon of Dock Green (UK) (1955–76)
- Doctor Who, UK (1963–89, 1996, 2005–present)
- Face the Nation (1954–present)
- Four Corners, Australia (1961–present)
- Grandstand (UK) (1958–2007)
- Gunsmoke (1955–75)
- Hallmark Hall of Fame (1951–present)
- Have Gun Will Travel (1957–63)
- Hockey Night in Canada (1952–present)
- It's Academic (1961–present)
- Juke Box Jury (1959–67, 1979, 1989–90)
- Lassie (1954–74)
- Love of Life (1951–80)
- Mack & Myer for Hire (1963–64)
- Match Game (1962–1969, 1973–84, 1990–91, 1998–99, 2016–present)
- Meet the Press (1947–present)
- Mister Ed (1961–66)
- My Three Sons (1960–72)
- Opportunity Knocks (UK) (1956–78)
- Panorama (UK) (1953–present)
- Petticoat Junction, (1963–70)
- Professional Bowlers Tour (1962–97)
- Search for Tomorrow (1951–86)
- The Adventures of Ozzie and Harriet (1952–66)
- The Amos 'n Andy Show (1951–53)
- The Andy Griffith Show (1960–68)
- The Avengers, UK (1961–69)
- The Bell Telephone Hour (1959–68)
- The Beverly Hillbillies (1962–71)
- The Danny Kaye Show (1963–1967)
- The Dick Van Dyke Show (1961–66)
- The Donna Reed Show (1958–66)
- The Ed Sullivan Show (1948–71)
- The Edge of Night (1956–84)
- The Flintstones (1960–66)
- The Fulton Sheen Program (1961–1968)
- The Good Old Days (UK) (1953–83)
- The Greatest Show on Earth (1963–64)
- The Guiding Light (1952–2009)
- The Jack Benny Program (1950–65)
- The Jetsons (1962–63, 1984–85, 1987)
- The Judy Garland Show (1963–64)
- The Late Late Show, Ireland (1962–present)
- The Lawrence Welk Show (1955–82)
- The Lucy Show (1962–68)
- The Mike Douglas Show (1961–81)
- The Milton Berle Show (1954–67)
- The Patty Duke Show, (1963–66)
- The Price Is Right (1956–65)
- The Saint, UK (1962–69)
- The Secret Storm (1954–74)
- The Sky at Night (UK) (1957–present)
- The Today Show (1952–present)
- The Tonight Show Starring Johnny Carson (1962–1992)
- The Tonight Show (Steve Allen, 1954–57; Jack Paar, 1957–62)
- The Twilight Zone (1959–64)
- The World Tonight, Philippines (1962–present)
- This Is Your Life (UK) (1955–2003)
- Truth or Consequences (1950–88)
- Twelve O'Clock High (1964–67)
- Walt Disney's Wonderful World of Color (1961–69)
- What the Papers Say (UK) (1956–2008)
- What's My Line (1950–67)
- Z-Cars, UK (1962–78)
- Zoo Quest (UK) (1954–1964)

== Debuts ==
- January 1 – Astro Boy (known as Mighty Atom in Japanese), on Fuji TV
- January 6 – Mutual of Omaha's Wild Kingdom on NBC (1963–88, 2002–2011)
- January 7 – World in Action, investigative current affairs series, on Granada Television (UK) (1963–98)
- January 14 –
- February 18 - The Art Linkletter Show on NBC (1963)
- April 1 – General Hospital (created by Frank and Doris Hursley) and The Doctors ABC (1963–) and NBC (1963–82) respectively
- August 9 – Ready Steady Go! on ITV (1963–66)
- September 16 – The Outer Limits on ABC (1963–65)
- September 17 – The Fugitive on ABC (1963–67)
- September 18 – The Patty Duke Show on ABC (1963–66)
- September 20 – Burke's Law on ABC (1963–65)
- September 24
  - The Littlest Hobo in Canada (1963–65; 1979–85)
  - Petticoat Junction on CBS (1963–70)
- September 25 - The Danny Kaye Show on CBS (1963–1967)
- September 28 - The New Phil Silvers Show (1963–64) and Tennessee Tuxedo and His Tales on CBS (1963–66)
- September 29 – The Judy Garland Show (1963–64) and My Favorite Martian (1963–66), both on CBS
- October 5 – Le Manège enchanté on la Première chaîne de la RTF (1963–1971, 1989)
- October 7 – Hafenpolizei on Deutsches Fernsehen (1963–66)
- October 20 – Ritorna il tenente Sheridan on Programma Nazionale
- October 27 – Memorandum van een dokter (1963–65)
- November 23 – Doctor Who on BBC Television (1963–89, 1996, 2005–); with William Hartnell as the Doctor (1963–66)
- December 1 – Den tänkande brevbäraren on SVT
- December 30 – Let's Make a Deal on NBC (1963–1977, 1980–81, 1984–1986, 1990–1991, 2003, 2009–present)
- Mack & Myer for Hire this year in syndication (1963–64)

== Ending this year ==
| Date | Show | Debut |
|---|---|---|
| January 25 | Don't Call Me Charlie! | 1962 |
| March 17 | The Jetsons (returned in 1985) | 1962 |
| April 2 | Hawaiian Eye | 1959 |
| April 14 | Car 54, Where Are You? | 1961 |
| April 23 | Popeye the Sailor | 1960 |
| May 5 | Ensign O'Toole | 1962 |
| May 14 | Empire | 1962 |
| May 21 | Laramie | 1959 |
| May 21 | The Voice of Firestone | 1949 |
| June 20 | Leave It to Beaver | 1957 |
| June 23 | The Real McCoys | 1957 |
| August 26 | Lippy the Lion and Hardy Har Har | 1962 |
| August 26 | Touché Turtle and Dum Dum | 1962 |
| August 30 | Wally Gator | 1962 |
| September 16 | The Art Linkletter Show | 1963 |
| September 28 | The Shari Lewis Show | 1960 |

== Births ==
| Date | Name | Notability |
|---|---|---|
| January 3 | New Jack | American professional wrestler (died 2021) |
| January 4 | Dave Foley | Canadian comedic actor (The Kids in the Hall, NewsRadio) |
| January 9 | Bob Gosse | Actor |
| January 16 | James May | English presenter (Top Gear) |
| January 19 | Martin Bashir | British journalist |
| January 20 | James Denton | Actor (Desperate Housewives) |
| January 21 | Hakeem Olajuwon | NBA basketball player |
| January 21 | Detlef Schrempf | NBA basketball player |
| January 23 | Gail O'Grady | Actress (NYPD Blue, American Dreams) |
| January 23 | Tony Daniels | Actor |
| January 25 | Jim Axelrod | National Correspondent |
| January 25 | Don Mancini | Screenwriter |
| January 29 | Monica Horan | Actress (Everybody Loves Raymond) |
| February 10 | Philip Glenister | Actor |
| February 12 | John Michael Higgins | Actor |
| February 14 | Enrico Colantoni | Canadian actor (Just Shoot Me!, Veronica Mars, Flashpoint) |
| February 15 | Steven Michael Quezada | Actor |
| February 17 | Michael Jordan | NBA basketball player (Space Jam) |
| February 17 | Larry the Cable Guy | American stand-up comedian |
| February 17 | Rene Syler | American broadcast television journalist |
| February 19 | Seal | British singer |
| February 19 | Jessica Tuck | Actress (One Life to Live, Judging Amy, True Blood) |
| February 20 | Charles Barkley | NBA basketball player and TV analyst |
| February 21 | William Baldwin | Actor |
| February 26 | Chase Masterson | Actress (Star Trek: Deep Space Nine) |
| March 1 | Bryan Batt | Actor |
| March 1 | Russell Wong | Actor |
| March 5 | Joel Osteen | Televangelist |
| March 6 | D. L. Hughley | Actor and comedian (The Hughleys) |
| March 7 | Bill Brochtrup | Actor (NYPD Blue) |
| March 9 | David Pogue | TV presenter |
| March 11 | Alex Kingston | Actress (ER) |
| March 12 | Jake Weber | English actor (Medium) |
| March 15 | Greg Nicotero | American special make-up effects creator |
| March 16 | Jerome Flynn | English actor |
| March 17 | Jane Tranter | English television executive |
| March 18 | Geoffrey Lower | Actor (Dr. Quinn, Medicine Woman) |
| March 18 | Vanessa Williams | Actress and singer (Ugly Betty, Desperate Housewives) |
| March 19 | Mary Scheer | Actress and comedian (Mad TV, iCarly) |
| March 20 | Gregg Binkley | Actor (Raising Hope) |
| March 20 | Kathy Ireland | Actress and model |
| March 31 | Paul Mercurio | Actor |
| April 3 | Sarah Woodward | Actress |
| April 4 | Graham Norton | TV presenter |
| April 8 | Dean Norris | Actor (Breaking Bad) |
| April 9 | Joe Scarborough | Television host |
| April 14 | Steve Hartman | Broadcast journalist |
| April 15 | Paula Pell | Actress |
| April 16 | Jimmy Osmond | Actor |
| April 17 | Joel Murray | Actor (Dharma & Greg) |
| April 18 | Eric McCormack | Canadian-American actor (Will & Grace, Perception) |
| April 18 | Conan O'Brien | Television host and comedian (Late Night, Conan) |
| April 18 | Don McGill | American television producer |
| April 21 | Erik King | Actor (Oz, Dexter) |
| April 21 | Roy Dupuis | Actor |
| April 26 | Olivia Birkelund | Actress (All My Children) |
| April 29 | Bruce Harwood | Actor |
| May 9 | Justin Vivian Bond | Actor |
| May 10 | Darryl M. Bell | Actor (A Different World) |
| May 11 | Roark Critchlow | Canadian actor (Drake & Josh, Zoey 101) |
| May 21 | Richard Appel | American writer |
| May 24 | Joe Dumars | NBA basketball player |
| May 25 | Mike Myers | Comic actor (Saturday Night Live) |
| May 29 | Tracey E. Bregman | Soap opera actress (The Young and the Restless, The Bold and the Beautiful) |
| May 29 | Lisa Whelchel | Actress (The Facts of Life) |
| May 29 | Mitchell Hurwitz | Writer |
| May 31 | Hugh Dillon | Canadian musician and actor (Flashpoint) |
| June 1 | Kevin A. Ross | American host |
| June 1 | Brian Goodman | American actor |
| June 6 | Jason Isaacs | English actor |
| June 9 | Johnny Depp | Actor (21 Jump Street) |
| June 10 | Jeanne Tripplehorn | Actress (Criminal Minds, Big Love) |
| June 12 | Tim DeKay | Actor |
| June 13 | Greg Daniels | Writer |
| June 15 | Helen Hunt | Actress (Mad About You) |
| June 17 | Greg Kinnear | Actor (Talk Soup) |
| June 19 | Laura Ingraham | American conservative television host |
| June 20 | Jeff Beal | Composer |
| June 22 | Randy Couture | Actor |
| June 25 | John Benjamin Hickey | Actor |
| June 27 | Jay Karnes | Actor |
| June 28 | Charlie Clouser | Composer |
| June 29 | Cathy Konrad | American film and television producer |
| June 30 | Rupert Graves | Actor |
| July 5 | Dorien Wilson | Actor (The Parkers) |
| July 5 | Edie Falco | Actress |
| July 8 | Rocky Carroll | Actor (Roc, Chicago Hope, NCIS) |
| July 13 | Kenny Johnson | Actor |
| July 14 | Maureen O'Boyle | Reporter |
| July 15 | Brigitte Nielsen | Actress |
| July 16 | Duane Clark | Writer |
| July 17 | John Ventimiglia | Actor |
| July 22 | Rob Estes | Actor (Silk Stalkings, Melrose Place, 90210) |
| July 22 | Joanna Going | Actress |
| July 24 | Karl Malone | NBA basketball player |
| July 27 | Donnie Yen | Actor |
| July 29 | Alexandra Paul | Actress and model (Baywatch) |
| July 30 | Lisa Kudrow | Actress (Phoebe on Friends) |
| July 30 | Chris Mullin | NBA basketball player |
| July 31 | Larry Romano | Actor |
| August 1 | Coolio | Rapper (died 2022) |
| August 1 | John Carroll Lynch | Actor |
| August 1 | Demián Bichir | Actor |
| August 3 | Isaiah Washington | Actor (Grey's Anatomy) |
| August 5 | Mark Strong | Actor |
| August 6 | Charles Ingram | Quiz show winner |
| August 7 | Harold Perrineau | Actor (Oz, Lost, Constantine) |
| August 7 | Julia Ford | English actress |
| August 7 | Ramon Estevez | American actor |
| August 8 | Jon Turteltaub | Producer |
| August 9 | Whitney Houston | Singer and actress (died 2012) |
| August 9 | Lonnie Quinn | Anchor |
| August 13 | Steve Higgins | Actor |
| August 16 | Christine Cavanaugh | Voice actress (Rugrats, Darkwing Duck, Aaahh!!! Real Monsters, Dexter's Laboratory) (died 2014) |
| August 19 | John Stamos | Actor (Jesse on Full House) |
| August 19 | Matthew Glave | Actor |
| August 19 | Martin Daniels | English magician entertainer |
| August 30 | Michael Chiklis | Actor (The Commish, The Shield) |
| August 30 | John King | News anchor |
| September 3 | Beth McCarthy-Miller | Director |
| September 3 | Holt McCallany | Actor |
| September 5 | Kristian Alfonso | Actress (Days of Our Lives) |
| September 7 | W. Earl Brown | American actor |
| September 8 | Brad Silberling | American television and film director |
| September 10 | Sean O'Bryan | American actor |
| September 12 | Ramón Franco | American actor (Tour of Duty) |
| September 12 | Norberto Barba | American director |
| September 14 | Tony Becker | Actor (Tour of Duty) |
| September 15 | Beth Cahill | Actress (Saturday Night Live) |
| September 16 | Richard Marx | Singer |
| September 16 | Dino Andrade | Voice actor |
| September 17 | James Urbaniak | Actor |
| September 18 | Dan Povenmire | Voice actor (Heinz Doofenshmirtz on Phineas and Ferb) |
| September 18 | Christopher Heyerdahl | Actor |
| September 19 | Jarvis Cocker | Presenter |
| September 25 | Tate Donovan | Actor (The O.C., Damages) |
| September 27 | Scott Lawrence | Actor (JAG) |
| September 27 | Marc Maron | Actor |
| September 28 | Susan Walters | Actress (Loving, The Young and the Restless) and model |
| September 29 | Les Claypool | Musician |
| October 1 | Beth Chamberlin | Actress (Guiding Light) |
| October 6 | Elisabeth Shue | Actress (CSI: Crime Scene Investigation) |
| October 9 | Sheila Kelley | American actress (L.A. Law, Sisters) |
| October 12 | JoAnn Willette | Actress (Just the Ten of Us) |
| October 13 | Chip Foose | TV host |
| October 13 | Hiro Kanagawa | Actor |
| October 14 | Lori Petty | Actress |
| October 25 | Jon Dixon | Actor (Felicity, Alias, Lost) |
| October 25 | Melinda McGraw | Actress |
| October 26 | Tom Cavanagh | Canadian actor (Ed, The Flash) |
| October 27 | Marla Maples | Actress |
| October 28 | Lauren Holly | Actress (Picket Fences, NCIS) |
| October 28 | Sheryl Underwood | Actress |
| October 29 | Tim Minear | Screenwriter |
| October 30 | Michael Beach | Actor (ER, Third Watch) |
| October 31 | Rob Schneider | Actor and comedian (Saturday Night Live) |
| November 3 | Brian Henson | Voice actor |
| November 5 | Tatum O'Neal | Actress |
| November 7 | Clint Mansell | English musician |
| November 8 | Eric B. | DJ |
| November 10 | Hugh Bonneville | English actor (Downton Abbey) |
| November 10 | Tommy Davidson | Comedian and actor (In Living Color, The Proud Family) |
| November 12 | Sam Lloyd | Actor (Scrubs) (died 2020) |
| November 17 | Felice Schachter | Actress (The Facts of Life) |
| November 17 | Dylan Walsh | Actor |
| November 19 | Terry Farrell | Actress and model (Star Trek: Deep Space Nine, Becker) |
| November 20 | Ming-Na Wen | Actress (ER, Agents of S.H.I.E.L.D.) |
| November 21 | Nicollette Sheridan | Actress (Knots Landing, Desperate Housewives) |
| November 23 | Armando Iannucci | Writer |
| November 25 | Kevin Chamberlin | Actor |
| November 25 | Sonja Morgan | American television personality |
| November 25 | Bernie Kosar | Sportscaster |
| November 27 | Fisher Stevens | Actor (Early Edition) |
| December 2 | Dan Gauthier | Actor (One Life to Live) |
| December 5 | Doctor Dré | Former MTV VJ |
| December 5 | Kerry Brown | Musician |
| December 7 | Randall Einhorn | Director |
| December 8 | Wendell Pierce | Actor |
| December 16 | Benjamin Bratt | Actor (Law & Order, Private Practice) |
| December 16 | James Mangold | Television director |
| December 18 | Brad Pitt | Actor (Glory Days) |
| December 19 | Jennifer Beals | Actress |
| December 20 | Joel Gretsch | Actor |
| December 23 | Jess Harnell | Voice actor (Animaniacs, Doc McStuffins, Sofia the First) |
| December 23 | Jim Harbaugh | Coach |
| December 26 | Roger Neill | Composer |
| December 28 | Willow Bay | American television journalist |

== Deaths ==
| Date | Name | Age | Notability |
|---|---|---|---|
| June 10 | Timothy Birdsall | 27 | English cartoonist (That Was the Week That Was) |
| November 22 | John F. Kennedy | 46 | American politician |

== Television debuts ==
- Ian Abercrombie – General Hospital
- Alun Armstrong – Compact
- Tom Atkins – The Doctors
- Erick Avari – General Hospital
- Henry Gibson – 77 Sunset Strip
- Michael Lerner – Dr. Kildare
- Ian McShane – First Night
- Michael Murphy – Combat!
- Jerry Orbach – The Doctors and the Nurses
- Ian Richardson – As You Like It
- Jon Voight – Naked City
- David Warner – BBC Sunday-Night Play
- Lesley Ann Warren – The Doctors
- Jacki Weaver – Hansel and Gretel
- Johnny Whitaker – General Hospital
- Anthony Zerbe – Naked City

== See also ==
- 1963–64 United States network television schedule
