= The Fox and the Crow (animated characters) =

Cartoon characters

Fox and Crow
- First appearance: The Fox and the Grapes (December 5, 1941)
- Last appearance: Punchy de Leon (January 12, 1950)
- Created by: Frank Tashlin
- Based on: The Fox and the Grapes and The Fox and the Crow from Aesop's Fables
- Voiced by: Both characters: Mel Blanc (1941); Frank Graham (1942–1946); Cal Howard (1947–1949) (as Fox); Dave Barry (1947–1949) (as Crow); John T. Smith (1948–1949); Daws Butler (1950)

In-universe information
- Species: Fox (Fauntleroy); Crow (Crawford)
- Gender: Males

The Fox and the Crow are a pair of anthropomorphic cartoon characters created by Frank Tashlin for the Screen Gems studio.

The characters, the refined but gullible Fauntleroy Fox and the streetwise Crawford Crow, appeared in a series of animated short subjects released by Screen Gems through its parent company, Columbia Pictures.

== Columbia cartoons ==
Tashlin directed the first film in the series, the 1941 Color Rhapsody short The Fox and the Grapes, loosely based on the Aesop fable of that name. Warner Bros. Cartoons director Chuck Jones later acknowledged this short, which features a series of blackout gags as the Fox repeatedly tries and fails to obtain a bunch of grapes in the possession of the Crow, as one of the inspirations for his popular Road Runner cartoons.

Although Tashlin directed no more films in the series (despite playing a supervisory role on the following two shorts, Woodman, Spare That Tree and Toll Bridge Troubles, prior to his departure), Screen Gems continued producing Fox and the Crow shorts, many of them directed by Bob Wickersham, until the studio closed in 1946. The remaining backlog of completed Screen Gems shorts (which ran in theaters through 1949) included two shorts starring a redesigned and recast Fox and Crow.

By this time, Columbia had signed a distribution deal with a new animation studio, United Productions of America (UPA), to produce three "Fox and the Crow" shorts, Robin Hoodlum (1948), The Magic Fluke (1949), and Punchy De Leon (1950). All three UPA Fox and the Crow cartoons were directed by John Hubley. The first two each received an Academy Award nomination for Animated Short Subject.

An unrelated, six-minute, silent animated short titled The Fox and the Crow, produced by Fables Studio, was released in 1921.

=== List of shorts ===
==== Screen Gems ====
In 1943, due to the series' success, Columbia gave the Fox and the Crow their own series separate from the Color Rhapsodies and it lasted until 1946. All cartoons from Room and Bored (1943) to Mysto-Fox (1946) belong to this series.

No.	Film	Direction	Original release date	Series
1	The Fox and the Grapes	Frank Tashlin	December 5, 1941	Color Rhapsody
2	Woodman, Spare That Tree	Bob Wickersham	July 2, 1942	Color Rhapsody
3	Toll Bridge Troubles	Bob Wickersham	November 27, 1942	Color Rhapsody
4	Slay It With Flowers	Bob Wickersham	January 29, 1943	Color Rhapsody
5	Plenty Below Zero	Bob Wickersham	May 14, 1943	Color Rhapsody
6	Tree for Two	Bob Wickersham	June 21, 1943	Color Rhapsody
7	A-Hunting We Won't Go	Bob Wickersham	August 23, 1943	Color Rhapsody
8	Room and Bored	Bob Wickersham	September 30, 1943	Fox and Crow
9	Way Down Yonder in the Corn	Bob Wickersham	November 25, 1943	Fox and Crow
10	The Dream Kids	Bob Wickersham	January 5, 1944	Fox and Crow
11	Mr. Moocher	Bob Wickersham	September 8, 1944	Fox and Crow
12	Be Patient, Patient	Bob Wickersham	October 27, 1944	Fox and Crow
13	The Egg-Yegg	Bob Wickersham	December 8, 1944	Fox and Crow
14	Ku-Ku Nuts	Bob Wickersham	March 30, 1945	Fox and Crow
15	Treasure Jest	Howard Swift	August 30, 1945	Fox and Crow
16	Phoney Baloney	Bob Wickersham	September 13, 1945	Fox and Crow
17	Foxy Flatfoots	Bob Wickersham	April 11, 1946	Fox and Crow
18	Unsure Runts	Howard Swift	May 16, 1946	Fox and Crow
19	Mysto-Fox	Bob Wickersham	August 29, 1946	Fox and Crow
20	Tooth or Consequences	Howard Swift	June 5, 1947	Phantasy
21	Grape Nutty	Alex Lovy	April 14, 1949	Color Rhapsody

==== UPA ====
No.	Film	Direction	Original release date	Series
22	Robin Hoodlum	John Hubley	December 23, 1948	Fox and Crow
23	The Magic Fluke	John Hubley	March 24, 1949	Fox and Crow
24	Punchy de Leon	John Hubley	January 12, 1950	Jolly Frolics

== In other media ==
=== Comic books ===
The Fox and the Crow
- The Fox and the Crow #1 (Jan. 1952), cover artist unknown

Publication information
- Publisher: DC Comics
- Publication date: Dec. 1951/Jan. 1952 - February–March 1968
- No. of issues: 108
- Main character(s): The Fox and the Crow; Stanley and His Monster

Creative team
- Written by: Cecil Beard and Alpine Harper
- Artist: Jim Davis

The Fox and the Crow starred in several talking animal comic books published by DC Comics, from the 1940s well into the 1960s. They starred with other characters in DC's Columbia-licensed talking-animal anthology Real Screen Comics (first issue titled Real Screen Funnies) beginning in 1945, then did likewise when DC converted the superhero title Comic Cavalcade to a talking-animal series in 1948.

The duo received its own title, The Fox and the Crow, which ran 108 issues (Jan. 1952 - March 1968). Until the 1954 demise of Comic Cavalcade, Fox and Crow were cover-featured on three DC titles. They continued on the cover of Real Screen Comics through its title change to TV Screen Cartoons from #129-138 (Aug. 1959 - Feb. 1961), the final issue.

The Fox and the Crow was renamed Stanley and His Monster beginning with #109 (May 1968), after the back-up feature, begun in #95 (Jan. 1966), that had taken over in popularity. For the last ten years of its existence, The Fox and the Crow was written by Cecil Beard, assisted by his wife, Alpine Harper. The illustrator was Jim Davis (b. 1915), although it was generally unsigned.

=== Feature films ===
Fauntleroy Fox and Crawford Crow were going to have a cameo in the 1988 film Who Framed Roger Rabbit, but were later dropped for unknown reasons, although they were mentioned in the Latin American dub.

== See also ==
- Foxes in popular culture
- Golden age of American animation
