= Gerald McBoing-Boing =

1950 film by Robert Cannon

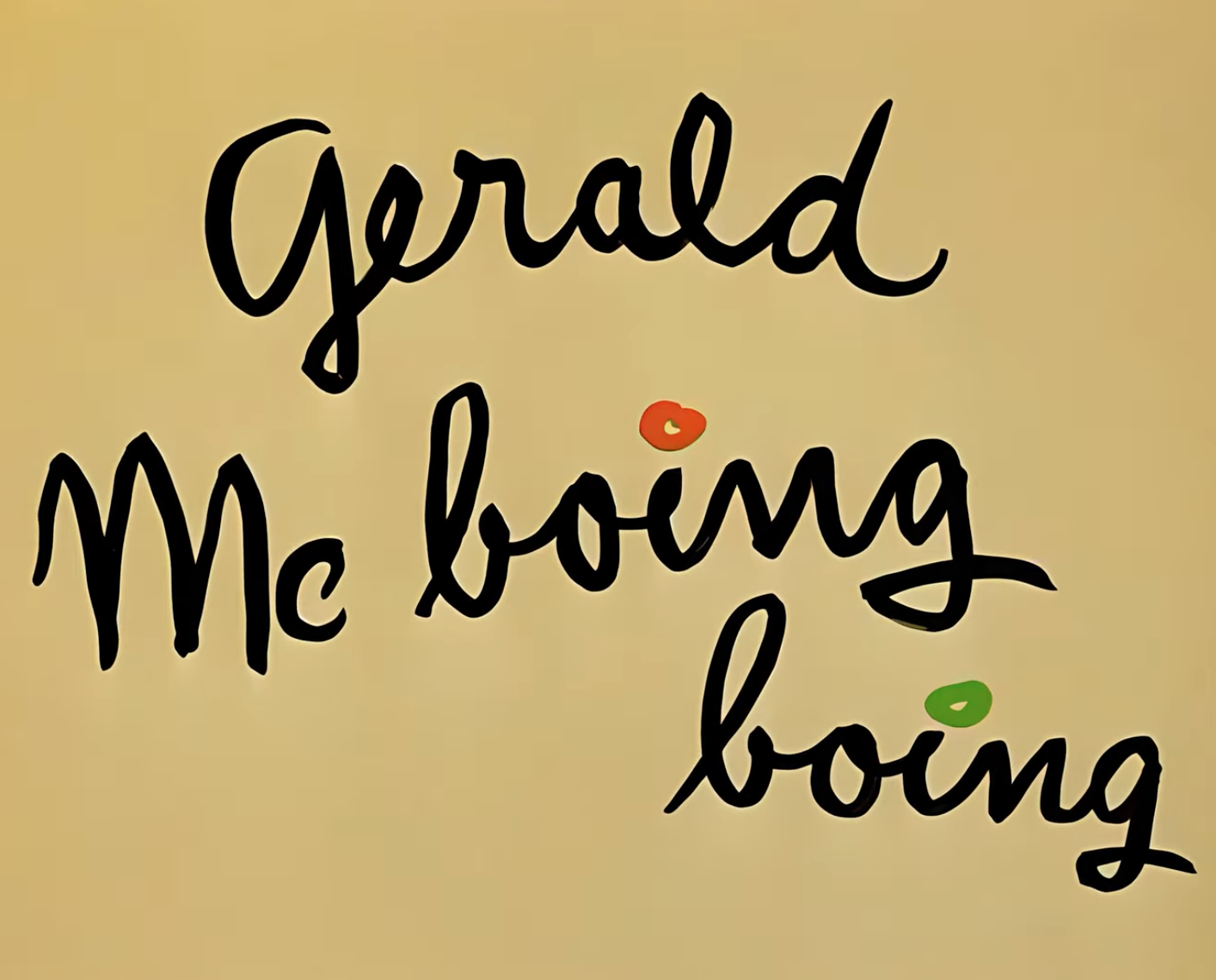
- Title card
- Directed by: Robert Cannon
- Story by: Dr. Seuss
- Produced by: John Hubley
- Narrated by: Marvin Miller
- Music by: Gail Kubik
- Animation by: Rudy Larriva; Pat Matthews; Bill Melendez; Willis Pyle; Frank Smith
- Layouts by: William T. Hurtz
- Backgrounds by: Jules Engel; Herbert Klynn
- Color process: Technicolor
- Production company: United Productions of America
- Distributed by: Columbia Pictures
- Release date: November 4, 1950
- Running time: 7 min
- Language: English
- Related: 2005 TV series

Gerald McBoing-Boing is a 1950 animated short film directed by Robert Cannon. It is the sixth film in the Jolly Frolics series and the first film featuring the titular character, a little boy who speaks through sound effects instead of spoken words. Produced by United Productions of America (UPA), it was given a wide release by Columbia Pictures on November 4, 1950. The story was adapted by Phil Eastman and Bill Scott from a story by Dr. Seuss.

Gerald McBoing-Boing won the 1950 Oscar for Best Animated Short. In 1994, it was voted #9 of The 50 Greatest Cartoons of all time by members of the animation field, making it the highest-ranked UPA cartoon on the list. In 1995, it was selected for preservation in the United States National Film Registry by the Library of Congress as "culturally, historically, or aesthetically significant".

== Original recording and UPA film ==
Dr. Seuss's story had originally appeared on a children's record scored by Billy May. It was issued by Capitol Records in early 1950 and narrated by radio veteran Harold Peary as "The Great Gildersleeve".

The New York Times reported a UPA’s vice president estimate that “It takes some 9,500 bits of animation and 25,000 drawings to turn out a seven-minute color subject” and that the 1950 animated film "came to be made by accident when 'Dr. Seuss,' famed for his children’s books, showed the script for a phonograph record to a U.P.A. man who immediately suggested it as a cartoon. It took some time to convince Seuss it could be done. His rhymes were edited down to seven minutes of screen time; Marvin Miller was engaged to do all of the voices; Robert Cannon was primarily responsible for the drawings, strongly reminiscent of a [Saul] Steinberg cartoon, and Bill Hurtz and Herb Klynn did the design and the color respectively."

This film was the first successful theatrical cartoon UPA produced after its initial experiments with a short series of cartoons featuring Columbia Pictures stalwarts the Fox and the Crow; it was UPA's tenth production for Columbia. The film was an attempt to break away from the strict realism in animation developed and perfected by Walt Disney. Cartoons did not have to obey the rules of the real world (as the short films of Tex Avery and their cartoon physics proved), and so UPA experimented with a non-realistic style that depicted caricatures rather than lifelike representations.

This was a major step in the development of limited animation, which had the added advantage of being much less expensive to produce.

The story describes Gerald McCloy, a two-year-old boy who begins "talking" in the form of sound effects, his first word being "boing boing". Panicked, his father calls the doctor, who tells him he can do nothing about it. As the boy grows up, he picks up more sounds and is able to make communicative gestures, but is still unable to utter a single word of the English language. He is admitted to a general public school, but more problems arise when he is chided by his peers and given the derogatory name "Gerald McBoing-Boing". After startling (and enraging) his father, he runs away and hops a train to an unknown location. Just before he catches the train, a talent scout from the NBC Radio Network (as identified by the NBC chimes) discovers Gerald and hires him as NBC's foley artist, performing shows for a division of the company labeled "XYZ" on the microphones, and Gerald becomes famous.

In January 1951—before the film's Academy Award nomination—LIFE magazine presented a two-page spread of eleven drawings from the film with their accompanying rhymed couplets. LIFE described Gail Kubik's score as "high-brow but humorous."

The Academy Award nomination for the UPA film was announced on 13 February 1951; the award was presented on 29 March 1951.

=== Sequels ===
UPA produced three follow-up shorts: Gerald McBoing Boing's Symphony (1953), How Now Boing Boing (1954), and Gerald McBoing! Boing! on Planet Moo (1956), an Academy Award nominee. The second and third films maintained the Dr. Seuss-style rhyming narration, but were not based on his work. The final film abandoned this approach.

All four Gerald McBoing Boing shorts were released in 1980 on home video under the title Columbia Pictures Presents Cartoon Adventures Starring Gerald McBoing Boing. The shorts were presented in subpar quality, especially Planet Moo, which was squeezed to fit the CinemaScope frame to standard TV screen size. It was reissued in 1985 as part of RCA/Columbia Pictures Home Video's "Magic Window" series of children's videotapes and went out of print in 1995.

The second short was included as a special feature on Sony's 2001 DVD release of The 5,000 Fingers of Dr. T.. All but the second were included in the special features of the two-disc special edition of the DVD Hellboy (released on July 27, 2004), as the cartoon can be seen playing on TV monitors in the background in several scenes. In January 2006, Sony re-issued the four shorts on DVD, featuring cleaned-up prints and all presented in their original aspect ratio.

== Television ==
=== UPA ===
==== The Gerald McBoing-Boing Show (1956–57) ====
In 1956, CBS created a half-hour Gerald McBoing-Boing Show, with radio announcer Bill Goodwin narrating. Broadcast at 5:30 p.m. on Sunday evenings, it was a showcase for UPA's cartoons, including Dusty of the Circus, The Twirlinger Twins, and Punch and Judy. The program proved too expensive and lasted only three months.

The episodes were repeated on Friday nights in the summer of 1957. Thus, The Gerald McBoing-Boing Show apparently became the first cartoon series broadcast regularly during prime time, preceding The Flintstones by four seasons.

==== TV specials ====
A character similar to Gerald McBoing-Boing appeared as Tiny Tim in the 1962 TV special Mr. Magoo's Christmas Carol as a speaking character.

=== Gerald McBoing-Boing (2005–2007) ===
A series based on the original cartoon started airing on Cartoon Network (United States) on August 22, 2005, as part of its short-lived Tickle-U programming block, and aired on Teletoon/Télétoon (Canada) on August 29 the same year. It uses the same basic art style as the original but more detailed: each 11-minute episode features a series of vignettes with Gerald, of which the "fantasy tales" are done in Seussian rhyme. Sound checks, gags, and "real-life" portions of the show are also included. It was also broadcast on ABC in Australia.

Gerald still only makes sounds (but is praised for it instead), but now has two speaking friends, Janine and Jacob, as well as a dog, Burp, who only burps. Gerald's parents complete the regular cast, although his mother has black hair in this series instead of blonde. The series was produced in Canada by Cookie Jar Entertainment, and directed by Robin Budd and story edited/written by John Derevlany. The animation was done by Mercury Filmworks in Ottawa.

== In print ==
A children's picture book illustrated by Mel Crawford was published by Simon & Schuster in 1952.

Also in 1952, Crawford illustrated a comic book adaptation of the story for the first issue of the Dell Comics series Gerald McBoing-Boing and the Nearsighted Mr. Magoo. Further adventures of the character were portrayed in four more issues of the series published through 1953.
