= History of anime =

The history of anime can be traced back to the start of the 20th century, with Japan producing its first animated films in the 1910s, the earliest verifiable Japanese animated film dates from 1917. However, it was not until the 1960s, with the work of Osamu Tezuka, often called the "God of Manga," that anime began to take shape as a distinct cultural phenomenon. Tezuka's Astro Boy (1963) is considered one of the first major anime TV series, setting the foundation for the animation industry. Over the following decades, anime grew in popularity both domestically and internationally, with diverse genres and styles emerging. By the 1980s and 1990s, anime had become a global phenomenon, with influential works such as Akira, Dragon Ball Z, and Sailor Moon reaching international audiences. Today, anime is a major part of global pop culture, known for its unique art styles, storytelling depth, and expansive influence across media. Before the advent of film, Japan already had a rich tradition of entertainment with colourful painted figures moving across a projection screen in utsushi-e (写し絵), a particular Japanese type of magic lantern show popular in the 19th century. Possibly inspired by European phantasmagoria shows, utsushi-e showmen used mechanical slides and developed lightweight wooden projectors (furo) that were handheld so that several performers could each control the motions of different projected figures.

The second generation of animators in the late 1910s included Ōten Shimokawa, Jun'ichi Kōuchi and Seitarō Kitayama, commonly referred to as the "fathers" of anime. Propaganda films, such as Momotarō no Umiwashi (1943) and Momotarō: Umi no Shinpei (1945), the latter being the first anime feature film, were made during World War II.

During the 1970s, anime developed further, with the inspiration of Disney animators, separating itself from its Western roots, and developing distinct genres such as mecha and its super robot subgenre. Popular shows from this period include Astro Boy, Lupin III and Mazinger Z. During this period several filmmakers gained worldwide fame, such as Hayao Miyazaki and Mamoru Oshii. Doraemon, which started airing in 1979, has become the longest-running anime of all time.

In the 1980s, anime became mainstream in Japan, experiencing a boom in production with the rise in popularity of anime including Gundam, Macross, Dragon Ball, and genres such as real robot, space opera and cyberpunk. Space Battleship Yamato and Super Dimension Fortress Macross also achieved worldwide success after being adapted respectively as Star Blazers and Robotech. The 1988 film Akira went on to become an international success. Later, in 2004, the same creators produced Steamboy, which became the most expensive anime film. Spirited Away shared the first prize at the 2002 Berlin Film Festival and won the 2003 Academy Award for Best Animated Feature, while Ghost in the Shell 2: Innocence was featured at the 2004 Cannes Film Festival.

== Precursors ==
Before film, Japan had already several forms of entertainment based on storytelling and images. Emakimono and kagee are considered precursors of Japanese animation. Emakimono was common in the eleventh century. Traveling storytellers narrated legends and anecdotes while the emakimono was unrolled from right to left with chronological order, as a moving panorama. Kagee was popular during the Edo period and originated from the shadow play of China. Magic lanterns from the Netherlands were also popular in the eighteenth century. The paper play known as kamishibai surged in popularity during the twelfth century and remained popular in the street theater until the 1930s. Puppets of the bunraku theater and ukiyo-e prints are considered precursors of Japanese animated characters. Finally, manga was a heavy inspiration for Japanese animation. Cartoonists Kitazawa Rakuten and Okamoto Ippei used film elements in their strips in the early 20th century.

== Origins of anime (1907–1922) ==
Katsudō Shashin

According to Natsuki Matsumoto, the first animated film produced in Japan may have stemmed from as early as 1907. Known as Katsudō Shashin (活動写真, "Activity Photo"), from its depiction of a boy in a sailor suit drawing the characters for katsudō shashin, the film was first found in 2005. It consists of fifty frames stencilled directly onto a strip of celluloid. This claim has not been verified though and predates the first known showing of animated films in Japan. The date and first film publicly displayed is another source of contention: while no Japanese-produced animation is definitively known to date before 1916, the possibility exists that other films entered Japan and that no known records have surfaced to prove a showing prior to 1912. Film titles have surfaced over the years, but none have been proven to predate this year. The first foreign animation is known to have been found in Japan in 1910, but it is not clear if the film was ever shown in a cinema or publicly displayed at all. Yasushi Watanabe found a film known as Fushigi no Bōrudo (不思議のボールド, "Miracle Board") in the records of the Yoshizawa Shōten (吉沢商店) company. The description matches James Blackton's Humorous Phases of Funny Faces, though academic consensus on whether or not this is a true animated film is disputed. According to Kyokko Yoshiyama, the first animated film called Nippāru no Henkei (ニッパールの変形, "Nippāru's Transformation") was shown in Japan at the Asakusa Teikokukan (浅草帝国館) in Tokyo sometime in 1912. However, Yoshiyama did not refer to the film as "animation". The first confirmed animated film shown in Japan was Les Exploits de Feu Follet by Émile Cohl on May 15, 1912. While speculation and other "trick films" have been found in Japan, it is the first recorded account of a public showing of a two-dimensional animated film in Japanese cinema. During this time, German animations marketed for home release were distributed in Japan. In 1914, American and European cartoons were introduced to Japan, inspiring Japanese creators like Junichi Kouchi and Seitaro Kitayama, both of whom were considered the "fathers of anime".

Namakura Gatana or Hanawa Hekonai meitō no maki, a short Japanese animated film produced by Jun'ichi Kōuchi in 1917

Few complete animations made during the beginnings of Japanese animation have survived. The reasons vary, but many are of commercial nature. After the clips had been run, reels (being property of the cinemas) were sold to smaller cinemas in the country and then disassembled and sold as strips or single frames. The earliest anime that was produced in Japan to have survived into the modern day, The Dull Sword, was released on June 30, 1917, but there it is disputed which title was the first to get that honour. It has been confirmed that Dekobō Shingachō: Meian no Shippai (凸坊新画帳・名案の失敗, "Bumpy New Picture Book: Failure of a Great Plan") was made sometime during February 1917. A title by the name of Convex new picture book Imo Suke boar hunting volume ( 凸坊新畫帖 芋助猪狩の巻) is the first anime domestic film.

The first anime short-films were made by three leading figures in the industry. Ōten Shimokawa was a political caricaturist and cartoonist who worked for the magazine Tokyo Puck. He was hired by Tenkatsu to do an animation for them. Due to medical reasons, he was only able to do five movies, including Imokawa Mukuzo Genkanban no Maki (1917), before he returned to his previous work as a cartoonist. Another prominent animator in this period was Jun'ichi Kōuchi. He was a caricaturist and painter, who also had studied watercolour painting. In 1912, he also entered the cartoonist sector and was hired for an animation by Kobayashi Shokai later in 1916. He is viewed as the most technically advanced Japanese animator of the 1910s. His works include around 15 movies. The third was Seitaro Kitayama, an early animator who made animations on his own and was not hired by larger corporations. He eventually founded his own animation studio, the Kitayama Eiga Seisakujo, which was later closed due to lack of commercial success. He used the chalkboard technique, and later paper animation, with and without pre-printed backgrounds. However, the works of these pioneers were destroyed after the Great Kanto Earthquake of 1923. The works of these two latter pioneers include Namakura Gatana ("An Obtuse Sword", 1917) and a 1918 film Urashima Tarō, which were believed to have been discovered together at an antique market in 2007. However, it was later established that this Urashima Tarō was most likely an entirely different film with a story similar to the missing 1918 film by Kitayama, and therefore is no longer credited to him. As of October 2017, Kitayama's Urashima Tarō remains undiscovered.

== Pre-war productions (1923–1939) ==
Yasuji Murata, Hakuzan Kimura, Sanae Yamamoto and Noburō Ōfuji were students of Kitayama Seitaro and worked at his film studio. Kenzō Masaoka, another important animator, worked at a smaller animation studio. Many early animated Japanese films were lost after the 1923 Tokyo earthquake, including destroying most of the Kitayama studio, with artists trying to incorporate traditional motifs and stories into a new form.

Prewar animators faced several difficulties. First, they had to compete with foreign producers such as Disney, which were influential on both audiences and producers. Foreign films had already made a profit abroad, and could be undersold in the Japanese market, priced lower than what domestic producers needed to break even. Japanese animators thus had to work cheaply, in small companies with only a handful of employees, which then made it difficult to compete in terms of quality with foreign product that was in color, with sound, and promoted by much bigger companies. Until the mid-1930s, Japanese animation generally used cutout animation instead of cel animation because the celluloid was too expensive. This resulted in animation that could seem derivative, flat (since motion forward and backward was difficult) and without detail. But just as postwar Japanese animators were able to turn limited animation into a plus, virtuosos such as Yasuji Murata and Noburō Ōfuji were able to perform wonders that they made with cutout animation.

Animators such as Kenzo Masaoka and Mitsuyo Seo, however, did attempt to bring Japanese animation up to the level of foreign work by introducing cel animation, sound, and technology such as the multiplane camera. Masaoka created the first talkie anime, Chikara to Onna no Yo no Naka, released in 1933, and the first anime made entirely using cel animation, The Dance of the Chagamas (1934). Seo was the first to use the multiplane camera in Ari-chan in 1941.

Such innovations, however, were difficult to support purely commercially, so prewar animation depended considerably on sponsorship, as animators often concentrated on making PR films for companies, educational films for the government, and eventually works of propaganda for the military. During this time, censorship and school regulations discouraged film-viewing by children, so anime that could possess educational value was supported and encouraged by the Monbusho (the Ministry of Education). This proved important for producers that had experienced obstacles releasing their work in regular theatres. Animation had found a place in scholastic, political, and industrial use.

== During the Second World War ==
In the 1930s, the Japanese government began enforcing cultural nationalism. This also lead to strict censorship and control of published media. Many animators were urged to produce animations that enforced the Japanese spirit and national affiliation. Some movies were shown in newsreel theatres, especially after the Film Law of 1939 promoted documentary and other educational films. Such support helped boost the industry, as bigger companies formed through mergers and prompted major live-action studios such as Shochiku to begin producing animation. It was at Shochiku that such masterworks as Kenzō Masaoka's Kumo to Chūrippu were produced. Wartime reorganization of the industry, however, merged the feature film studios into three big companies.

During the Second World War, more animated films were commissioned by the Imperial Japanese Army, showing the sly, quick Japanese people winning against enemy forces. This included films such as Maysuyo Seo's Momotarō: Umi no Shinpei (Momotaro: Sacred Sailors) (1943) which focused on the Japanese occupation of Asia.

== Post-war environment ==
In the post-war years, Japanese media was often influenced by the United States, leading some to defining anime as any animation emanating from Japan after 1945. In fact, the term itself became more and more common around this time period.

Anime and manga began to flourish in the 1940s and 1950s, with foreign films (and layouts by American cartoonists), influencing people such as Osamu Tezuka.

In the 1950s, anime studios began appearing across Japan. Hiroshi Takahata bought a studio named Japan Animated Films in 1948, renaming it Tōei Dōga, with an ambition to become "the Disney of the East." While there, Takahata met other animators such as Yasuji Mori, who directed Doodling Kitty, in May 1957. However, for the Japanese public, it wasn't until the release of Panda and the Magic Serpent in October 1958 that Japan fully entered into world of professional animation. While animators began to experiment with their own styles, Tezuka Osamu began drawing shonen manga like Rob no Kishi (Knight of the Ribbon), which later became Princess Knight, trying to appeal to female readers, while also pioneering shoujo manga.

== Toei Animation and Mushi Production ==
Toei Animation was founded and produced the first color anime feature film in 1958, Hakujaden (The Tale of the White Serpent, 1958). It was released in the United States in 1961 as well as Panda and the Magic Serpent. After the success of the project, Toei released a new feature-length animation annually.

Osamu Tezuka established Mushi Production in 1961, after Tezuka's contract with Toei Animation expired. The studio pioneered TV animation in Japan, and was responsible for such successful TV series as Astro Boy, Kimba the White Lion, Gokū no Daibōken and Princess Knight.

Mushi Production also produced the first anime to be broadcast in the United States (on NBC in 1963), although Osamu Tezuka would complain about the restrictions on American television, and the alterations necessary for broadcast. The first anime shown in the United States was Animal Baseball Match (動物大野球戦), which was produced in 1949 but shown in the United States in 1957.

== 1960s ==
In the 1960s, a unique style of Japanese animation began to take shape, with large-eyed, big-mouthed, and large-headed character designs. The first anime film to be broadcast was Three Tales in 1960. 1961 saw the premiere of Japan's first animated television series, Instant History, although it did not consist entirely of animation. Magic Boy, known in Japan as Shōnen Sarutobi Sasuke (少年猿飛佐助; "The Boy Sarutobi Sasuke"), is a 1959 Japanese animated feature film released on December 25, 1959. Released as Toei Animation's second theatrical anime, the film was released in theaters in the United States by Metro-Goldwyn-Mayer on June 22, 1961, making it the first anime film to be released in the country, followed by Panda and the Magic Serpent on July 8, 1961. These films were popular enough they paved the way for other anime to follow. Astro Boy, created by Osamu Tezuka, premiered on Fuji TV on January 1, 1963. It became the first anime series shown widely to Western audiences, especially to those in the United States, becoming relatively popular and influencing U.S. popular culture, with American companies acquiring various titles from Japanese producers. Astro Boy was highly influential to other anime in the 1960s, and was followed by a large number of anime about robots or space. While Tezuka released many other animated shows, like Kimba the White Lion (based on his own manga), anime took off, and studios considered it a commercial success. With the decade bringing anime to television and to America, early agreements were made between producers in the U.S. and Japan that planned the spread of anime to other places around the globe.

1963 introduced Sennin Buraku as the first "late night" anime and Toei Doga's first anime television series Wolf Boy Ken. Mushi Pro continued to produce more anime television and met success with titles such as Kimba the White Lion in 1965. What is noted as the first magical girl anime, Sally the Witch, began broadcasting in 1966. The original Speed Racer anime television show debuted in 1967 and was brought to the West with great success. At the same time, an anime adaptation of Tezuka's Princess Knight aired, making it one of very few shoujo anime of the decade. The first anime adaptation of Shotaro Ishinomori's manga Cyborg 009 debuted in 1968, following the film adaptation two years prior. 1969's "Attack no.1", the first shoujo sports anime, was one of the first to have success in Japanese primetime and was also popular throughout Europe, particularly in Germany under the name "Mila Superstar."

The long-running Sazae-san anime also began in 1969 and continues today with excess of 6,500 episodes broadcast as of 2014. With an audience share of 25%, the series is still the most-popular anime broadcast.

== 1970s ==
The release of Space Battleship Yamato is often cited as the beginning of anime space operas.

During the 1970s, the Japanese film market shrank due to competition from television. This reduced Toei animation's staff and many animators went to studios such as A Pro and Telecom animation. Mushi Production went bankrupt (though the studio was revived 4 years later), with its former employees founding studios such as Madhouse and Sunrise. Many young animators were thrust into the position of director, and the injection of young talent allowed for a wide variety of experimentation. One of the earliest successful television productions in the early 1970s was Tomorrow's Joe (1970), a boxing anime which has become iconic in Japan. 1971 saw the first installment of the Lupin III anime. Contrary to the franchise's current popularity, the first series ran for 23 episodes before being cancelled. The second series (starting in 1977) saw considerably more success, spanning 155 episodes over three years.

Another example of this experimentation is Isao Takahata's 1974 television series Heidi, Girl of the Alps. This show was originally a hard sell because it was a simple realistic drama aimed at children, and most TV networks thought children needed something more fantastical to draw them in. Heidi was an international success, popular in many European countries, and so successful in Japan that it allowed for Hayao Miyazaki and Takahata to start a series of literary-based anime (World Masterpiece Theater). Miyazaki and Takahata left Nippon Animation in the late 1970s. Two of Miyazaki's critically acclaimed productions during the 1970s were Future Boy Conan (1978) and Lupin III: The Castle of Cagliostro (1979).

Doraemon, which was broadcast on TV Asahi in 1979, became the most widely watched and popular anime series of all time.

During this period, Japanese animation reached continental Europe with productions aimed at European and Japanese children, with the most-pronounced examples being the aforementioned Heidi but also Barbapapa and Vicky the Viking. Specifically, anime and manga found receptive audiences in Italy, Germany, and France; East and Southeast Asia; and throughout Latin America. Each country's interest increased in Japan's output, which was offered for a low price. In the 1970s, censored Japanese animation was shown on American television. For example, transgender characters were censored in Battle of the Planets, an American adaptation of Science Ninja Team Gatchaman.

Another genre known as mecha came into being at this time. Some early works include Mazinger Z (1972–1974), Science Ninja Team Gatchaman (1972–1974), Space Battleship Yamato (1974–75) and Mobile Suit Gundam (1979–80).

In contrast to male-targeted action-oriented shows, shows for a female audience such as Candy Candy and The Rose of Versailles earned high popularity on Japanese television and later in other parts of the world. By 1978, over fifty anime shows were airing on Japanese television.

== 1980s ==
In the 1980s, anime started to go through a "visual quality renewal" thanks to new directors like Hayao Miyazaki and Isao Takahata, who founded Studio Ghibli in 1985, and Katsuhiro Ōtomo. Anime began to deal with more nuanced and complex stories, while "boy's love" continued to impact cultural norms, taking root across East Asia, as countries such as South Korea, Thailand, and China ingested these Japanese pop culture exports. The shift towards space operas became more pronounced with the commercial success of Star Wars (1977). The science fiction genre, as a whole, had a strong influence on Japanese animation, shaping its creative direction.

This allowed for the space opera Space Battleship Yamato (1974) to be revived as a theatrical film. Mobile Suit Gundam (1979) was also successful and revived as a theatrical film in 1982. The success of the theatrical versions of Yamato and Gundam is seen as the beginning of the anime boom of the 1980s, and of "Japanese Cinema's Second Golden Age".

A subculture in Japan, whose members later called themselves otaku, began to develop around animation magazines such as Animage and Newtype. These magazines formed in response to the overwhelming fandom that developed around shows such as Yamato and Gundam in the late 1970s and early 1980s.

In the United States, the popularity of Star Wars had a similar, though much smaller, effect on the development of anime. Gatchaman was reworked and edited into Battle of the Planets in 1978 and again as G-Force in 1986. Space Battleship Yamato was reworked and edited into Star Blazers in 1979. The Macross series began with The Super Dimension Fortress Macross (1982), which was adapted into English as the first arc of Robotech (1985), which was created from three separate anime titles: The Super Dimension Fortress Macross, Super Dimension Cavalry Southern Cross and Genesis Climber Mospeada. The sequel to Mobile Suit Gundam, Mobile Suit Zeta Gundam (1985), became the most successful real robot space opera in Japan, where it managed an average television rating of 6.6% and a peak of 11.7%.

The otaku subculture became more pronounced with Mamoru Oshii's adaptation of Rumiko Takahashi's popular manga Urusei Yatsura (1981). Yatsura made Takahashi a household name and Oshii would break away from fan culture and take a more auteuristic approach with his 1984 film Urusei Yatsura 2: Beautiful Dreamer. This break with the otaku subculture would allow Oshii to experiment further.

The otaku subculture had some effect on people who were entering the industry around this time. The most famous of these people were the amateur production group Daicon Films which would become Gainax. Gainax began by making films for the Daicon science fiction conventions and were so popular in the otaku community that they were given a chance to helm the most expensive anime film at the time, Royal Space Force: The Wings of Honnêamise (1987).

The film Nausicaä of the Valley of the Wind helped jumpstart Studio Ghibli.

One of the greatest and most influential anime films of all time, Nausicaä of the Valley of the Wind (1984), was made during this period. The film gave extra prestige to anime, allowing for many experimental and ambitious projects to be funded shortly after its release. It also allowed director Hayao Miyazaki and his longtime colleague Isao Takahata to create their own studio under the supervision of former Animage editor Toshio Suzuki. This studio would become known as Studio Ghibli and its first film was Castle in the Sky (1986), one of Miyazaki's most-ambitious films.

The success of Dragon Ball (1986) introduced the martial arts genre to a wider audience and became incredibly influential in the Japanese animation industry. It influenced many more martial arts anime and manga series, including Hajime no Ippo (1989), Baki the Grappler (1991), Naruto (2002), and The God of Highschool (2020).

The 1980s also brought anime to the home video market in the form of original video animations (OVA), as shows were shifting from a focus on superheroes to robots and space operas; the format debuted on the market in 1984, with varying lengths. Home videos opened up floodgates, introducing viewers, especially those in the West, to anime films. Although anime was widely distributed through international piracy in the 1980s and 1990s, before the days of online piracy, it continued to survive. Anime recovered in the U.S., becoming more of Japan's television exports as the country became the "world's leading authority" in entertainment. The first OVA was Mamoru Oshii's Dallos (1983–1984). Shows such as Patlabor had their beginnings in this market and it proved to be a way to test less-marketable animation against audiences. The OVA format allowed for the release of pornographic anime such as Cream Lemon (1984); however, the first hentai OVA was actually the little-known Wonder Kids studio's Lolita Anime, also released in 1984.

Additionally, the decade saw the amalgamation of anime with video games. The airing of Red Photon Zillion (1987) and subsequent release of its companion game, is considered to have been a marketing ploy by Sega to promote sales of their newly released Master System in Japan.

Golgo 13: The Professional, and Daikon IV became the first anime mediums to utilize 3D computer-generated imagery (CGI); both debuting in 1983.

Sports anime, as it is now known, made its debut in 1983 with an anime adaptation of Yoichi Takahashi's soccer manga Captain Tsubasa, which became the first worldwide successful sports anime. Its themes and stories were a formula that would be used in many sports series that followed, such as Slam Dunk, Prince of Tennis and Eyeshield 21.

The late 1980s saw an increasing number of high-budget and experimental films. In 1985, Toshio Suzuki helped put together funding for Oshii's experimental film Angel's Egg (1985). Theatrical releases became more ambitious, with each film trying to outclass or outspend its predecessors, taking cues from Nausicaä's critical and commercial success. Night on the Galactic Railroad (1985), Tale of Genji (1986), and Grave of the Fireflies (1988) were all ambitious films based on important literary works in Japan. Films such as Arion (1986) and Char's Counterattack (1988) were lavishly budgeted spectacles. This period of lavish budgeting and experimentation would reach its zenith with one of the most-expensive anime film productions ever: Royal Space Force: The Wings of Honneamise (1987). Studio Ghibli's Kiki's Delivery Service (1989) was the top-grossing film of 1989, earning over $40 million at the box office.

Despite the commercial failure of Akira (1988) in Japan, it brought with it a much larger international fan base for anime. When shown overseas, the film became a cult hit and, eventually, a symbol of the medium’s success in the West. The domestic failure and international success of Akira, combined with the bursting of the bubble economy and Osamu Tezuka's death in 1989, marked the end of the 1980s era of anime.

== 1990s ==
In 1995, Hideaki Anno wrote and directed the highly acclaimed and controversial anime Neon Genesis Evangelion. This show became popular in Japan among anime fans and became known to the general public through mainstream media attention. It is believed that Anno originally wanted the show to be the ultimate otaku anime, designed to revive the declining anime industry, but midway through production he also made it into a heavy critique of the subculture. It culminated in the successful but controversial film The End of Evangelion which grossed over $10 million in 1997. The many violent and sexual scenes in Evangelion caused TV Tokyo to increase censorship of anime content. As a result, when the neo-noir space Western Cowboy Bebop was first broadcast in 1998, it was shown heavily edited and only half the episodes were aired; it too gained heavy popularity both in and outside of Japan.

Evangelion started a series of so-called "post-Evangelion" or "organic" mecha shows. Most of these were giant robot shows with some kind of religious or complex plot. These include RahXephon, Brain Powerd, and Gasaraki. It also led to late-night experimental anime shows which became a forum for experimental anime such as Boogiepop Phantom (2000), Texhnolyze (2003) and Paranoia Agent (2004). Experimental anime films were also released in the 1990s, most notably the cyberpunk thriller Ghost in the Shell (1995), which had a strong influence on The Matrix. Ghost in the Shell, alongside Evangelion and Cowboy Bebop, helped further increase the popularity of anime in international markets.

3D rendering was used in this scene of Princess Mononoke, the most expensive anime film at the time, costing $20 million.

In 1997, Hayao Miyazaki's Princess Mononoke became the most-expensive anime film up until that time, costing $20 million to produce. Miyazaki personally checked each of the 144,000 cels in the film, and is estimated to have redrawn parts of 80,000 of them. 1997 was also the year of Satoshi Kon's debut, Perfect Blue, which won "Best Film" and "Best Animation" awards at Montreal's 1997 Fantasia Festival, It also won awards in Portugal's Fantasporto Film Festival.

The late 1990s also saw a brief revival of the super robot genre that had decreased in popularity due to the rise of real robot and psychological mecha shows like Gundam, Macross, and Evangelion. The revival of the super robot genre began with Brave Exkaiser in 1990, and led to remakes and sequels of 1970s super robot shows like Getter Robo Go and Tetsujin-28 go FX. There were very few popular super robot shows produced after this, until Tengen Toppa Gurren Lagann in 2007.

Alongside its super robot counterpart, the real robot genre was also declining during the 1990s. Though several Gundam shows were produced during this decade, very few of them were successful. The only Gundam shows in the 1990s which managed an average television rating over 4% in Japan were Mobile Fighter G Gundam (1994) and New Mobile Report Gundam Wing (1995). It wasn't until Mobile Suit Gundam SEED in 2002 that the real robot genre regained its popularity.

By 1997, over one hundred anime shows were airing on television in Japan, including a widely popular series based on the Pokémon video game franchise. Other 1990s anime series which gained international success were Dragon Ball Z, Sailor Moon, and Digimon Adventure; the success of these shows brought international recognition to the martial arts superhero genre, the magical girl genre, and the action-adventure genre, respectively. In particular, Dragon Ball Z and Sailor Moon were dubbed into more than a dozen languages worldwide. Another large success was the anime One Piece, based on the best-selling manga of all time, both of which are still ongoing.

== 2000s ==
The "Evangelion-era" trend continued into the 2000s with Evangelion-inspired mecha anime such as RahXephon (2002) and Zegapain (2006) – RahXephon was also intended to help revive 1970s-style mecha designs. The number of anime productions began to decline after peaking in 2006 due to alternative forms of entertainment, less ad revenue, and other reasons, with TV Tokyo remaining one of the only channels airing anime shows. Even so, anime began entering U.S. homes like never before, with fans able to get their hands on Japanese-language originals of anime they watched, thanks to the internet.

The real robot genre (including the Gundam and Macross franchises), which had declined during the 1990s, was revived in the early 2000s with the success of shows such as Mobile Suit Gundam SEED (2002), Eureka Seven (2005), Code Geass: Lelouch of the Rebellion (2006), Mobile Suit Gundam 00 (2007), and Macross Frontier (2008).

The 1970s-style super robot genre revival began with GaoGaiGar in 1997 and continued into the 2000s, with several remakes of classic series such as Getter Robo and Dancougar, as well as original titles created in the super robot mold like Godannar and Gurren Lagann. Gurren Lagann in particular combined the super robot genre with elements from 1980s real robot shows, as well as 1990s "post-Evangelion" shows. Gurren Lagann received both the "best television production" and "best character design" awards from the Tokyo International Anime Fair in 2008. This eventually culminated in the release of Shin Mazinger in 2009, a full-length revival of the first super robot series, Mazinger Z.

An art movement started by Takashi Murakami that combined Japanese pop culture with postmodern art called Superflat began around this time. Murakami asserts that the movement is an analysis of post-war Japanese culture through the eyes of the otaku subculture. His desire is also to get rid of the categories of 'high' and 'low' art making a flat continuum, hence the term 'superflat'. His art exhibitions have gained popularity overseas and have influenced a handful of anime creators, particularly those from Studio 4 °C.

The experimental late night anime trend popularized by Serial Experiments Lain also continued into the 2000s with experimental anime such as Boogiepop Phantom (2000), Texhnolyze (2003), Elfen Lied (2004), Paranoia Agent (2004), Gantz (2004), and Ergo Proxy (2006). Elfen Lied in particular being aired on subsidiary premium network AT-X, allowing director Mamoru Kanbe to push the boundaries of violence, nudity, and story themes, as well as employ unique artistic elements such as artwork inspired by Austrian painter Gustav Klimt.

Before the massive boom from companies like Funimation and Adult Swim, viewing or even obtaining anime in the United States was quite difficult due to the market value and low interest in the country, and many broadcasting companies would not air anime. This was due to a number of factors, one of which was getting the show translated. Anime is often dubbed over with English voices for Western audiences. However in the early 1990s, when anime was first stating to become popular internationally, dubbing was rare. Many fans of the genre would translate the show themselves and would post them online for others to view; these are called fansubs. This trend would continue until September 2, 2001, when the show Cowboy Bebop first aired on the broadcasting network Adult Swim and was the first anime to be broadcast on live television. The show was an instant success with its only issue being its late air time, meaning that the audience was smaller than usual.

In addition to these experimental trends, the 2000s were also characterized by an increase of moe-style art and bishōjo and bishōnen character design. There was a rising presence and popularity of genres such as romance, harem and slice of life.

Anime based on eroge and visual novels increased in popularity in the 2000s, building on a trend started in the late 1990s by such works as Sentimental Journey (1998) and To Heart (1999). Examples of such works include Green Green (2003), SHUFFLE! (2006), Kanon (2002 and 2006), Fate/Stay Night (2006), Higurashi no Naku Koro ni (2006), Ef: A Tale of Memories (2007), True Tears (2008), and Clannad (2008 and 2009).

Many shows have been adapted from manga and light novels, including popular titles such as Yu-Gi-Oh! Duel Monsters (2000), Inuyasha (2000), Naruto and its sequel series Naruto Shippuden (2002 and 2007 respectively), Fullmetal Alchemist and its more faithful adaptation Fullmetal Alchemist: Brotherhood (2003 and 2009 respectively), Monster (2004), Bleach (2004), Rozen Maiden (2005), Aria the Animation (2005), Shakugan no Shana (2005), Pani Poni Dash! (2005), Death Note (2006), Mushishi (2006), Sola (2007), The Melancholy of Haruhi Suzumiya (2006), Lucky Star (2007), Toradora! (2008), Soul Eater (2008), K-On! (2009), Bakemonogatari (2009), and Fairy Tail (2009); these shows typically lasted several years and garnered large fanbases. Nevertheless, original anime titles continue to be produced with the same success.

The 2000s marked a trend of emphasis of the otaku subculture. A notable critique of this otaku subculture is a central theme of the 2006 anime Welcome to the N.H.K., which features a hikikomori (socially withdrawn) protagonist and explores the effects and consequences of various Japanese sub-cultures, such as otaku, lolicon, internet suicide, massively multiplayer online games and multi-level marketing.

In contrast to the above-mentioned phenomena, there have been more productions of late-night anime for a non-otaku audience as well. The first concentrated effort came from Fuji TV's Noitamina block. The 30-minute late-Thursday timeframe was created to showcase productions for young women of college age, a demographic that historically had watched very little anime. The first production Honey and Clover was a particular success, peaking at a 5% TV rating in Kantou, which was very strong for late-night anime. The block has been running uninterrupted since April 2005 and has yielded many successful productions unique in the modern anime market.

There were also revivals of American cartoons such as Transformers, which spawned four new series; Transformers: Car Robots in 2000, Transformers: Micron Legend in 2003, Transformers: Superlink in 2004, and Transformers: Galaxy Force in 2005. In addition, an anime adaptation of the G.I Joe series was produced, titled G.I. Joe: Sigma 6.

The revival of earlier anime series was seen in the forms of Fist of the North Star: The Legends of the True Savior (2006) and Dragon Ball Z Kai (2009). Later series also started receiving revivals in the late 2000s and early 2010s, such as with Studio Khara's Rebuild of Evangelion tetralogy (2007–2021), and new adaptations of Masamune Shirow's manga Appleseed XIII (2011) and Ghost in the Shell: Arise (2013–2016).

The decade also dawned a revival of high-budget feature-length anime films, such as Millennium Actress (2001), Metropolis (2001), Appleseed (2001), Paprika (2006), and the most expensive of all, Steamboy (2004), which cost $26 million to produce. Satoshi Kon established himself alongside Otomo and Oshii as one of the premier directors of anime film, before his premature death at the age of 46. Other younger film directors, such as Mamoru Hosoda, director of The Girl Who Leapt Through Time (2006) and Summer Wars (2009), also began to reach prominence.

During this decade, anime feature films were nominated for and won major international film awards for the first time in the industry's history. In 2002, Spirited Away, a Studio Ghibli production directed by Hayao Miyazaki, won the Golden Bear at the Berlin International Film Festival and, in 2003 at the 75th Academy Awards, won the Academy Award for Best Animated Feature. It was the first non-American film to win the award and is one of only two to do so. It has also become the highest grossing anime film, with a worldwide box office of US$274 million.

Following the launch of the Toonami programming block on Cartoon Network in the United States in March 1997, anime saw a giant rise in the North American market. Kid-friendly anime such as Pokémon, Yu-Gi-Oh!, Digimon, Doraemon, Bakugan, Beyblade, Sonic X, and the 4Kids Entertainment adaptation of One Piece all achieved varying levels of success. This era also saw the rise of anime-influenced animation, most notably Avatar: the Last Airbender and its sequel The Legend of Korra, Megas XLR, Code Lyoko, Ben 10, Chaotic, Samurai Jack, Teen Titans The Boondocks, and RWBY. Anime further became entrenched in U.S. households with the launch of Adult Swim by Cartoon Network in 2001, aimed at those in the "older OVA and tape trading crowd," with a new fandom forming. This fandom was, however, exclusive and elitist, with newcomers expected to know how to use IRC, some basic Japanese, and so on.

By 2004, over two hundred anime shows were airing on television.

At the 2004 Cannes Film Festival, Ghost in the Shell 2: Innocence, directed by Mamoru Oshii, was in competition for the Palme d'Or and in 2006, at the 78th Academy Awards, Howl's Moving Castle, another Studio Ghibli-produced film directed by Hayao Miyazaki, was nominated for Best Animated Feature. 5 Centimeters per Second, directed by Makoto Shinkai, won the inaugural Asia Pacific Screen Award for Best Animated Feature Film in 2007, and so far, anime films have been nominated for the award every year.

In 2006, graduates of the University of California, Berkeley launched Crunchyroll in 2006, becoming the first "anime streaming service", a model later used by Netflix, Funimation, and Amazon.com in the 2010s.

== 2010s ==
In May 2012, the Toonami programming block in the United States was relaunched as a late night adult-oriented action block on Adult Swim, bringing more uncut popular anime to a wider audience on cable television. In addition to broadcasting or re-broadcasting previously released dubbed anime, the block (as well as Adult Swim itself) oversaw the worldwide premiere of English dubbed releases for various anime, including but not limited to: Durarara!! (2010), Deadman Wonderland (2011), Hunter x Hunter (2011), Sword Art Online (2012), JoJo's Bizarre Adventure (2012), Attack on Titan (2013), Kill la Kill (2013), Space Dandy (2014), Akame ga Kill! (2014), Parasyte -the maxim- (2014), One-Punch Man (2015), Dragon Ball Super (2015), My Hero Academia (2016), Boruto: Naruto Next Generations (2017), and Demon Slayer: Kimetsu no Yaiba (2019).

On September 1, 2013, Hayao Miyazaki announced that The Wind Rises (2013) would be his last film, and on August 3, 2014, it was announced that Studio Ghibli was "temporarily halting production" following the release of When Marnie Was There (2014), further substantiating the finality of Miyazaki's retirement. The disappointing sales of Isao Takahata's comeback film The Tale of Princess Kaguya (2013) has also been cited as a factor. Several prominent staffers, including producer Yoshiaki Nishimura and director Hiromasa Yonebayashi, left to form their own Studio Ponoc, premiering with Mary and the Witch's Flower (2017). Both Ghibli and Miyazaki subsequently returned for the production for the 2023 film The Boy and the Heron, while Takahata died on April 5, 2018, of lung cancer.

Various international anime distribution companies, such as ADV Films, Bandai Entertainment, and Geneon Entertainment, were shut down due to poor revenue, with their assets spun into new companies like Sentai Filmworks or given to other companies.

In 2011, Puella Magi Madoka Magica was aired in Japan. The anime was a departure from typical magical girl anime, as it contained darker, more complex, and gorier themes than what was seen in the genre. The anime was well-received by critics, with United Kingdom's Anime Network's Andy Hanley rating it a 10 out of 10 for its emotional content and evocative soundtrack.

Both Attack on Titan and The Wind Rises began to reflect a national debate surrounding the reinterpretation of Article 9 of the Constitution of Japan, with Miyazaki's pacifism in the latter work coming under fire from the political right, while Attack on Titan has been accused of promoting militarism by people in neighboring Asian countries, despite being intended to show the haunting, hopeless aspects of conflict. The mecha anime genre (as well as Japanese kaiju films) received a Western homage with the 2013 film Pacific Rim, directed by Guillermo del Toro.

Western streaming services such as Netflix and Amazon Prime Video became increasingly involved in the production and licensing of anime for the international markets. By 2015, an all-record-high of 340 anime series were airing on television.

== 2020s ==
The global popularity and demand of anime continued to rise during the decade due to the COVID-19 pandemic and the medium's wide availability on movie theaters and streaming services.

Demon Slayer: Kimetsu no Yaiba the Movie: Mugen Train became the highest-grossing Japanese film and the world's highest-grossing film of 2020. It also became the fastest grossing film in Japanese cinema, earning 10 billion yen ($95.3m; £72m) in 10 days. It beat the previous record of Spirited Away, which took 25 days.

In 2021, the anime adaptations of Jujutsu Kaisen, Demon Slayer: Kimetsu no Yaiba and Tokyo Revengers were among the top 10 most discussed TV shows worldwide on X (then known as Twitter).

In 2022, Attack on Titan won the award of "Most In-Demand TV Series in the World 2021" in the Global TV Demand Awards. it became the first ever non-English language series to earn the title of World's Most In-Demand TV Show, previously held by only The Walking Dead and Game of Thrones.

In 2023, the opening theme "Idol" by YOASOBI of the anime series Oshi no Ko topped the Billboard Global 200 Excl. U.S. charts with 45.7 million streams and 24,000 copies sold outside the U.S. "Idol" has become the first Japanese song and anime song to top the Billboard Global chart, and it also took the top spot on Apple Music's Top 100: Global chart.

In 2024, Studio Ghibli's The Boy and the Heron won the Academy Award for Best Animated Feature, making it the second Oscar award won by Hayao Miyazaki. It became the second non-English language film to win the award, after Spirited Away.

== Firsts ==
First...	Native language name	English name	Released	Type
Anime (oldest known)	活動写真	Katsudō Shashin	Unknown; believed to be about 1911 (Note: Katsudō Shashin is thought to have been made sometime between 1907 and 1911. It is not known if this film was ever publicly displayed or released as evidence suggests it was mass-produced to be sold to wealthy owners of home projectors.)	Short Film
Confirmed film release	凸坊新畫帖 芋助猪狩の巻	Convex new picture book Imo Suke boar hunting volume	January 1917	Short Film
Anime publicly shown in a theater	芋川椋三玄関番の巻 or 芋川椋三玄関番之巻	The Story of the Concierge Mukuzo Imokawa	April 1917	Short Film
Talkie	力と女の世の中	Within the World of Power and Women (Note: Also referred to as The World of Power and Women.)	April 13, 1933	Film
Entirely cel-animated anime	茶釜音頭	The Dance of the Chagamas	1934	Film
Feature film	桃太郎 海の神兵	Momotaro: Sacred Sailors (Note: Also referred to as Momotaro's Divine Sea Warriors or Momotaro: God Warriors of the Sea.)	April 12, 1945	Film
Appearance on television (non-series)	もぐらのアバンチュール	Mole's Adventure	July 14, 1958	Short Film
Color feature film	白蛇伝	The Tale of the White Serpent	October 22, 1958	Film
Television series	インスタントヒストリー	Instant History	May 1, 1961	Series
First popular television series worldwide and Ep's telling	鉄腕アトム	Astro Boy	January 1, 1963	Series
Late night series	仙人部落	Hermit Village	September 4, 1963	Series
Giant robot series	鉄人28号	Tetsujin 28-gō	October 20, 1963	Series
Cyborg series	8マン	8 Man	November 7, 1963	Series
Color television series	ジャングル大帝	Kimba the White Lion	October 6, 1965	Series
Magical girl series	魔法使いサリー	Sally the Witch	December 5, 1966	Series
Horror series	ゲゲゲの鬼太郎	GeGeGe no Kitarō	January 3, 1968	Series
Sports series	巨人の星	Star of the Giants	March 30, 1968	Series
Adult-oriented (animated) film	千夜一夜物語	A Thousand and One Nights	June 14, 1969	Film
Hentai with an "X rating" (Note: Most erotic works have been retroactively tagged as "hentai" since the coining of the term in English. As such, there is no agreed upon first hentai series or film.)	クレオパトラ	Cleopatra	September 15, 1970	Film
Dark Fantasy series	デビルマン	Devilman	July 8, 1972	Series
First Giant Robot series with inside cockpit	マジンガーZ	Mazinger Z	December 3, 1972	Series
Space opera series	宇宙戦艦ヤマト	Space Battleship Yamato	October 6, 1974	Series
Use of stereo sound	ルパン三世 カリオストロの城	Lupin III: The Castle of Cagliostro	December 15, 1979	Film
Isekai series	聖戦士ダンバイン	Aura Battler Dunbine	February 5, 1983	Series
Anime with computer-generated imagery	ゴルゴ13	Golgo 13: The Professional	May 28, 1983	Film
First anti-war anime	はだしのゲン	Barefoot Gen	July 21, 1983	Film
OVA	ダロス	Dallos	December 12, 1983	OVA
Cyberpunk series	ビデオ戦士レザリオン	Video Warrior Laserion	March 4, 1984	Series
Post apocalyptic anime	風の谷のナウシカ	Nausicaä of the Valley of the Wind	March 11, 1984	Film
First popular worldwide movie	アキラ	Akira	July 16, 1988	Film
First computer cel generated anime	機動警察パトレイバー 2 the Movie	Patlabor 2	August 7, 1993	Film
Fully computer-animated anime	A.LI.CE	A.LI.CE	February 5, 2000	Film
Original net animation	無限のリヴァイアス イリュージョン	Infinite Ryvius	June 30, 2000	ONA
First anime film to be nominated for and win Best Animated Feature	千と千尋の神隠し	Spirited Away	July 20, 2001	Film
First popular computer-animated anime	ペコラ	Pecola	September 3, 2001	Series
First HD anime	攻殻機動隊 STAND ALONE COMPLEX	Ghost in the Shell: Stand Alone Complex	October 1, 2002	Series
First 4K anime	SOL LEVANTE	Sol Levante	April 2, 2020	ONA
First anime created outside of Japan	나 혼자만 레벨업	Solo Leveling	January 7, 2024	ONA

== Records ==
Record...	Native language name	English name	Released	Type
Highest grossing anime film in Japan	劇場版「鬼滅の刃」 無限列車編	Demon Slayer: Kimetsu no Yaiba – the Movie: Mugen Train	October 16, 2020	Film
Fastest grossing anime film	劇場版「鬼滅の刃」 無限列車編	Demon Slayer: Kimetsu no Yaiba – the Movie: Mugen Train	October 16, 2020	Film
Highest grossing anime film worldwide	劇場版「鬼滅の刃」 無限列車編	Demon Slayer: Kimetsu no Yaiba – the Movie: Mugen Train	October 16, 2020	Film

== See also ==
- History of animation
- History of comics
- History of manga
- List of years in anime
- History of anime in the United States
