= List of anime by release date (pre-1939) =

The short film The Dull Sword (1917), the oldest extant animated film made for cinemas known to exist.

This is a list of anime by release date which covers Japanese animated productions that were made between 1917–1938. Anime in Japan can be traced back to three key figures whom in the early 20th century started experimenting with paper animation. It is unknown when the first animated film was made for public viewing, but historians have tied the year 1917 as being the key date. Very few of the first animations that were made survive to this day due to the 1923 Great Kantō earthquake. At one point it was even thought that all animated works made before the earthquake were lost until the discovery of two films in 2008. Production of animated works resumed again after the earthquake, and by the early/mid 1930s sound, and cel animation were starting to appear. Later in the decade, Japan went to war with China, resulting in paper needed for the war to be used sparingly. As a result, new manga stories disappeared from the public while the Japanese government stepped in to regulate what was being released through the cinemas to take its place. The mid to late 1930s saw more animated works that were propaganda-themed, as Japanese nationalism was rising in the country.

== 1917–1922 ==
Japanese animation can be traced back to 1917 as a year of definitive firsts. The three key figures at the time were Ōten Shimokawa, Seitarō Kitayama, and Junichi Kouchi each contributing to making the first short films that would be known as anime. While each one of these people are respected in their own right, the status of "first animated film" remains in dispute as there is conflicting information regarding film premiere dates. According to contemporary sources of the time, an unknown titled film of Tennenshoku Katsudō Shashin premiered in January. Evidence of this comes from Kinema Record, with the July edition making specific claim to the first release occurring in January, but does not specify the title of the work. Shimokawa's film Imokawa Mukozo the Doorman is conventionally and largely claimed to be the first work, but contemporary sources portray it as the "third" film. Speculation about the error is debated, but the two now lost films and their contents have been reported by various sources allowing for a clearer picture of the early history.

The first confirmed film release occurred in the first ten days of February, with Shimokawa's Dekobō shingachō – Meian no shippai (凸坊新画帳・名案の失敗, Bumpy new picture book – Failure of a great plan). The film was produced with chalk on a blackboard, with redrawing for each frame. Shimokawa would switch to paper for later, but the exact date and work to depict the switch is unknown. Kouchi's first film Hanawa Hekonai Meitō no Maki (塙凹内名刀之巻, Hanawa Hekonai – The famous sword) also known as Namakura Gatana (なまくら刀, Dull Katana) and Tameshigiri (試し斬, The sword test) premiered on June 30. This film is currently the earliest surviving work, and was only rediscovered in March 2008. Katsudō Shashin was widely reported as possibly dating to 1907, but is of unconfirmed origin and is not known to have premiered or been produced for commercial interest.

Of the animated films produced in 1918, only one surviving film called "Momotarō" remains. This particular film is notable for being the first animated film to be shown outside Japan. Another survivor after this date is an animated advertisement for soap made c.1921 that was found in 2018. There are no known animated films that were made from 1923 in existence, which could be the result of the 1923 Great Kantō earthquake.

| English name | Japanese name | Romaji | Format | Original Release Date | Status |
|---|---|---|---|---|---|
| Battle of a Monkey and a Crab | 猿蟹合戦 | Sarukani gassen | Short Film | 1917 | Lost film |
| Bumpy new picture book – Failure of a great plan | 凸坊新画帳・名案の失敗 | Dekobō shingachō – Meian no shippai | Short Film | 1917 | Lost film |
| Bunbuku kettle (Fairy-tale: Bunbuku kettle) | 文福茶釜 (お伽噺・文福茶釜) | Bunbuku chagama Otogibanashi-Bunbuku chagama | Short Film | 1917 | Lost film |
| Cat and Mice | 猫と鼠 | Neko to nezumi | Short Film | 1917 | Unknown |
| Chamebō ‒ Air gun (aka: "Chame's air gun") | 茶目坊空気銃の巻 茶目の空気銃 | Chamebō Kūkijū no maki "Chame no kūkijū" | Short Film | 1917 | Unknown |
| Chamebō's new picture book – The Revenge of Mr. and Mrs. Flea | 茶目坊新画帳・蚤夫婦仕返しの巻 | Chamebō shingachō – Nomi fūfu shikaeshi no maki | Short Film | 1917 | Unknown |
| Great Oaks from Little Acorns Grow | 塵も積もれば山となる | Chiri mo tsumoreba yama to naru | Short Film | 1917 | Unknown |
| Hanawa Hekonai – The Famous Sword (aka: "The Dull Katana" or "The Sword Test") | 塙凹内名刀之巻 なまくら刀 or 試し斬 | Hanawa Hekonai Meitō no Maki "Namakura Gatana" or "Tameshigiri" | Short Film | 1917 | Extant |
| Hanawa Hekonai – The Kappa Festival | 塙凹内かっぱまつり | Hanawa Hekonai Kappa matsuri | Short Film | 1917 | Unknown |
| Imokawa Mukuzō goes fishing (aka: "Chamebōzu goes fishing") | 芋川椋三釣の巻 茶目坊主魚釣の巻 | Imokawa Mukuzō Tsuri no maki "Chamebōzu Uozuri no maki" | Short Film | 1917 | Unknown |
| Imokawa Mukuzō – Somersault | 芋川椋三宙返りの巻 | Imokawa Mukuzō – Chūgaeri no maki | Short Film | 1917 | Unknown |
| Imokawa Mukuzō – The Concierge ("Concierge" also translates into "Janitor") | 芋川椋三玄関番之巻 or 芋川椋三玄関番の巻 | Imokawa Mukuzo Genkanban no Maki | Short Film | 1917 | Lost film |
| Kachikachi Mountain | カチカチ山 | Kachikachiyama | Short Film | 1917 | Lost film |
| Naughty Mailbox | いたずらポスト | Itazura posuto | Short Film | 1917 | Unknown |
| Sparrow with no Tongue | 舌切雀 | Shitakire suzume | Short Film | 1917 | Lost film |
| The Dream Car | 夢の自動車 | Yume no jidōsha | Short Film | 1917 | Unknown |
| The Ministry of Culture's Art Exhibition | 文展の巻 | Bunten no maki | Short Film | 1917 | Unconfirmed |
| The Old Man Who Made Flowers Bloom | 花咲爺 | Hanasaka-jiji | Short Film | 1917 | Lost film |
| The Pot and the Black Cat | お鍋と黒猫の巻 | Onabe to kuroneko no maki | Short Film | 1917 | Unconfirmed |
| What to do with your Postal Savings | 貯金の勧 | Chokin no susume | Short Film | 1917 | Lost film |
| Issun-bōshi (Note: This title is sometimes translated into English as "Little One-Inch" or "The Inch-High Samurai".) | 一寸法師 | Issun-bōshi | Short Film | 1918 | Unknown |
| Kintaro | 金太郎 | Kintarou | Short Film | 1918 | Unknown |
| Momotarō (anime) | 桃太郎 | Momotarou | Short Film | 1918 | Lost film |
| Snowman | 雪達磨 | Yukidaruma | Short Film | 1918 | Unknown |
| Taro the Guard, The Submarine | 太郎の番兵 潜航艇の巻 | Taro no Banpei, Senkotei no Maki | Short Film | 1918 | Lost film |
| The Ant and the Pigeon | 蟻と鳩 | Ari to Hato | Short Film | 1918 | Unknown |
| The Frog's Dream | 蛙の夢 | Kaeru no Yume | Short Film | 1918 | Unknown |
| Tarou Urashima | 浦島太郎 | Urashima Tarou | Short Film | 1918 | Lost film |
| Household Soap | カテイ石鹸 | Katei Sekken | Short Film | c.1921 (Note: This film is given two different possible dates which range from 1920 to "around 1922".) | Extant |

== 1923 earthquake ==
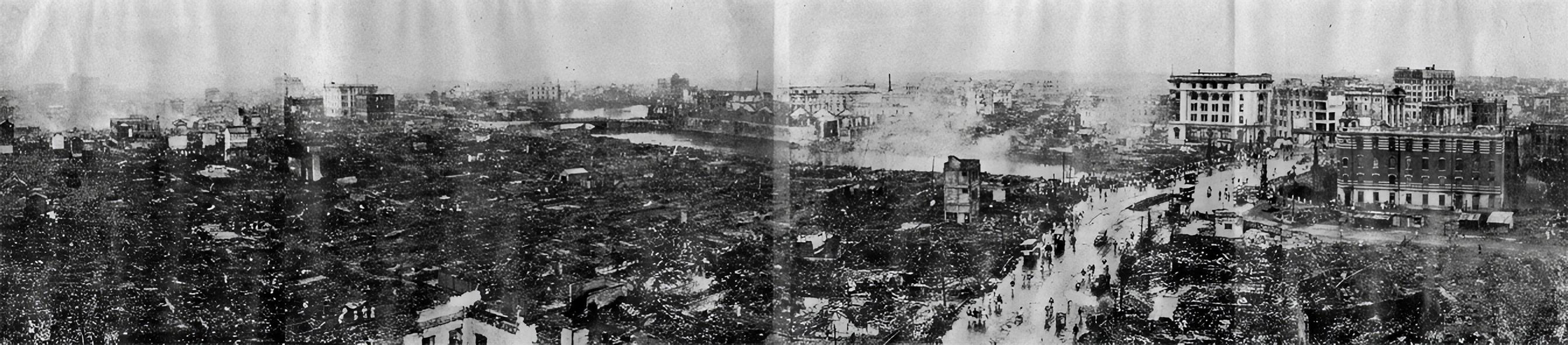
Total destruction of Nihonbashi and Kanda seen from the Roof of Dai-ichi Sogo Building, Kyōbashi

The Great Kantō earthquake which occurred on September 1, 1923 dealt incredible damage in Japan with 105,385 confirmed deaths. The damage from this natural disaster was the greatest sustained prior to World War II. Prior to the rediscovery of several Japanese animated films it was presumed that all prints produced up to its date had been destroyed. The account and record of these films themselves has been expanded, with Patten's Watching Anime, Reading Manga: 25 Years of Essays and Reviews 2004 book claiming that three films were produced in 1917 when over a dozen works are now known. Despite the findings, the earthquake along with World War II have resulted in only 4% of all Japanese films made before 1945 being known to exist today.

== 1924–1938 ==
After the earthquake, production of new films took place within a year. For the early films, benshi, storytellers were hired who sat next to the screen and narrated the silent movies. They were descendants of kabuki jōruri, kōdan storytellers, theater barkers and other forms of oral storytelling. The first animated "talkie" or sound film titled Chikara to Onna no Yo no Naka ("World of Power and Women") was made in 1933, now a lost film it was a breakthrough for Japanese animation. However, at the time more than 80 percent of movies made in the country were still silents. By the mid 1930s the animation style was changing as well, chiyogami or paper animation was being phased out in favor of cel animation. Previously this latter form had been dismissed as too costly to use. In 1934, the first entirely cel animated short entitled The Dance of the Chagamas was made. Cel animated shorts of the mid 1930s borrowed aspects that were being used at the time by Disney. Towards the end of the decade, political events taking place at home as well as abroad were changing animation styles in Japan towards propaganda, and national pride.

- Note: The kanji 漫画 means "cartoon", this is found before some of the titles in the sources listed below.

| English name | Japanese name | Romaji | Format | Original Release Date | Status |
|---|---|---|---|---|---|
| Crab Temple | 蟹満寺縁起 | Kanimanjiengi | Short Film | 1924 | Extant |
| Genzo Performs a Ceremony with a Parting Cup | 赤垣源蔵徳利の別れ | Akagaki Genzo tokkuri no wakare | Short Film | 1924 | Unknown |
| Jewels Whisper | 宝珠のささやき | Hōshu no Sasayaki | Short Film | 1924 | Unknown |
| Stand Up with Shinpei Goto | 人気の焦点に立てる後藤新平 | Ninki no shōten ni tateru Gotō Shinpei | Short Film | 1924 | Unknown |
| The Hare and The Tortoise | 兎と亀 | Usagi to Kame | Short Film | 1924 | Extant |
| Budget Politics | 予算政治 | Yosan seiji | Short Film | 1925 | Unknown |
| Dreamy Urashima | ノンキナトウサン竜宮参り | Nonkinatousan Ryugu Mairi | Short Film | 1925 | Lost film |
| Same Voters | 醒めよ有権者 | Sameyo yūkensha | Short Film | 1925 | Unknown |
| Shiobara Tasuke | 塩原多助 | Shiobara Tasuke | Short Film | 1925 | Extant |
| The Pot | つぼ | Tsubo | Short Film | 1925 | Extant |
| Ubasuteyama | 姨捨山 | Ubasuteyama | Short Film | 1925 | Extant |
| A Story of Tobacco | 煙り草物語 | Kemurigusa Monogatari | Short Film | 1926 | Extant |
| Burglars of "Baghdad" Castle | 馬具田城の盗賊 | Bagudajo no tozoku | Short Film | 1926 | Extant |
| Diseases Spread | 病毒の伝播 | Byodoku no denpa | Short Film | 1926 | Extant |
| Ethicization of Politics by Shinpei Goto, 1926 | 政治の倫理化 後藤新平 1926 | Eigaenzetsu Seiji no rinrika Gotō Shinpei 1926 | Short Film | 1926 | Extant |
| Journey to the West: Songoku's Story | 西遊記孫悟空物語 | Saiyuuki: Son Gokuu Monogatari | Short Film | 1926 | Extant |
| A Ship of Oranges | みかん船 | Mikan-bune | Short Film | 1927 | Extant |
| Battle of a Monkey and a Crab (Note: Possibly a remake of the 1917 lost film of the same name.) | 猿蟹合戦 | Sarukani gassen | Short Film | 1927 | Extant |
| Kita Hell Paradise | 弥次喜多 地獄極楽 | Yaji-Kita jigoku gokuraku | Short Film | 1927 | Unknown |
| Power of Co-operation | 協同の力 | Kyōdō no chikara | Short Film | 1927 | Unknown |
| The Octopus Skeleton | タコなしホーン | Tako nashi hon | Short Film | 1927 | Extant |
| The Whale | くじら | Kujira | Short Film | 1927 | Unknown (Note: "The Whale" was recreated by Noburō Ōfuji in 1952 using cutouts of transparent coloured cellophane. It is unclear what happened to the original black and white production.) |
| Animal Olympic Games | 動物オリムピック大会 | Doubutsu Olympic Taikai | Short Film | 1928 | Extant |
| For the Sake of Your Country | 御国の為に | Okuninotameni | Short Film | 1928 | Extant |
| Momotaro the Undefeated | 日本一桃太郎 | Nihonichi Momotaro | Short Film | 1928 | Extant |
| Star | 星 | Hoshi | Short Film | 1928 | Lost film |
| The Bunbuku Teapot | 文福茶釜 | Bunbuku Chagama | Short Film | 1928 | Extant |
| The Nation of Fish | 魚の國 | Sakana no kuni | Short Film | 1928 | Extant |
| The Old Man Who Made Flowers Bloom | 花咲爺 | Hanasaka-jiji | Short Film | 1928 | Extant |
| The Special Congress of Eraeraera | 普選漫史特別議会 | Fusen man shi tokubetsu gikai | Short Film | 1928 | Unknown |
| Liar's Castle | うそつき城 | Usotsuki-jō | Short Film | 1929 | Unknown |
| Taro's Toy Train | 太郎さんの汽車 | Taro-san no Kisha | Short Film | 1929 | Extant |
| The Black Cat | 黒ニャゴ | Kuro Nyago | Short Film | 1929 | Extant |
| The Eraeraera of the Proposed History Agreement | 普選漫史協定案の巻 | Fusen man shi kyōtei an no maki | Short Film | 1929 | Unknown |
| The Golden Flower | こがねの花 | Kogane no hana | Short Film | 1929 | Extant |
| The Stolen Lump | 瘤取り | Kobutori | Short Film | 1929 | Extant |
| The Tiny One Makes it Big | 一寸法師ノ出世 | Issunboushi no Shusse | Short Film | 1929 | Extant |
| Two Worlds | 二つの世界 | Futatsu no sekai | Short Film | 1929 | Extant |
| At the Border Checkpoint | お関所 | Osekisho | Short Film | 1930 | Extant |
| Chimney Sweep Pero | 煙突屋ペロー | Entotsuya Peroo | Short Film | 1930 | Extant |
| Chopped Snake | ちょん切れ蛇 | Chongire Hebi | Short Film | 1930 | Unknown |
| My Ski Trip | おい等のスキー | Oira no suki | Short Film | 1930 | Extant |
| Nonsense Story, Vol.1: Monkey Island | 難船ス物語 第壱篇 猿ヶ嶋 | Nansensu Monogatari Daiippen Sarugashima | Short Film | 1930 | Extant |
| The Bat | かうもり | Komori | Short Film | 1930 | Extant |
| The Donkey | 驢馬 | Roba | Short Film | 1930 | Extant |
| The Monkey Masamune | 猿正宗 | Saru Masamune | Short Film | 1930 | Extant |
| The Village Festival | 村祭り | Mura Matsuri | Short Film | 1930 | Extant |
| Animal Sumo | 動物相撲大会 | Doubutsu Sumo Taikai | Short Film | 1931 | Extant |
| At the Circus | 見世物見物 | Misemono kenbutsu | Short Film | 1931 | Extant |
| A Wolf is a Wolf | 狼は狼だ | Okami wa okamida | Short Film | 1931 | Extant |
| Chameko's Day | 茶目子の一日 | Chameko no Ichinichi | Short Film | 1931 | Extant |
| Electrical Telegraphy, Electric Bells and Telephones | 電信 電鈴 電話 | Denshin Denrei Denwa | Short Film | 1931 | Extant |
| Home Alone Mice | 鼠の留守番 | Nezumi no Rusuban | Short Film | 1931 | Extant |
| Momotaro's Sky Adventure | 空の桃太郎 | Sora no Momotarou | Short Film | 1931 | Extant |
| Idiots and the Lord of the Castle | 馬鹿八と城主様 | Bakahachi to jōshu-sama | Short Film | 1931 | Unknown |
| Old Man Goichi | 五一ぢいさん | Goichi Jiisan | Short Film | 1931 | Extant |
| Our Baseball Match | おい等の野球 | Oira no Yakyuu | Short Film | 1931 | Extant |
| Shipwreck Story – First Chapter – Monkey Island | 難船ス物語 第一篇 猿ケ島 | Nansensu Monogatari – Daiichi-hen – Sarugashima | Short Film | 1931 | Extant |
| Shipwreck Story – Second Chapter – The Pirate Ship | 難船ス物語 第二篇 海賊船 | Nansensu Monogatari – Daini-hen – Kaizokusen | Short Film | 1931 | Unknown |
| Slave War | 奴隷戦争 | Dorei senso | Short Film | 1931 | Unknown |
| Song of Spring | 春の唄 | Haru no Uta | Short Film | 1931 | Extant |
| Spring Review | レビュー 春 | Rebyu Haru | Short Film | 1931 | Extant |
| Tanukichi's Story | タヌ吉のお話 | Tanukichi no Ohanashi | Short Film | 1931 | Unknown |
| Taro Urashima | 浦島太郎 | Urashima Taro | Short Film | 1931 | Extant |
| The Candy Man's Raccoon Dog Dance | あめやたぬき | Ameyatanuki | Short Film | 1931 | Extant |
| The Duckling Saves the Day | アヒルのお手柄 | Ahiru no Otegara | Short Film | 1931 | Extant |
| The National Anthem Kimigayo | 国歌 君か代 | Kokka Kimigayo | Short Film | 1931 | Extant |
| Animal Sports Day | 動物運動会 | Doubutsu undokai | Short Film | 1931 | Extant |
| The Unlucky Butterfly | 蝶のさいなん | Cho no Sainan | Short Film | 1931 | Extant |
| Three Little Bears | 三匹の小熊さん | Sanbiki no Koguma-san | Short Film | 1931 | Extant |
| Will Power | 心の力 | Kokoro no chikara | Short Film | 1931 | Extant |
| Armies of the World | の列国陸軍 | Rekkoku Rikugun | Short Film | 1932 | Extant |
| Detective Felix in Trouble | FELIXノ迷探偵 | Felix no meitantei | Short Film | 1932 | Extant |
| Momotarou of the Sea / Momotaro's Underwater Adventure | 海の桃太郎 | Umi no Momotaro | Short Film | 1932 | Extant |
| Olympic Games on Dankichi Island | ダン吉島のオリムピック大会 | Dankichi-jima no Olympic Taikai | Short Film | 1932 | Extant |
| Rhythmic Triangles/Fighting Cards | 三角のリズム トランプの爭 | Hatena, Sankaku no rizumu, Toranpu no arasoi | Short Film | 1932 | Extant |
| Sports Day at Animal Village | 動物村のスポーツデー | Doubutsu-mura no Sports Day | Short Film | 1932 | Extant |
| The Bear Brothers | 兄弟こぐま | Kyoudai Koguma | Short Film | 1932 | Extant |
| The Cat Purr Dance | ニヤゴダンス | Nyago dansu | Short Film | 1932 | Extant |
| Animal Sports Day 2 | 動物運動会2 | Doubutsu undokai 2 | Short Film | 1932 | Fragment |
| The Development of the Train | 汽車の發達 | Kisya no hattatsu | Short Film | 1932 | Extant |
| The Plane Cabby's Lucky Day | 大当り空の円タク | Ooatari Sora No Entaku | Short Film | 1932 | Extant |
| The Ugly Duckling | あひるの子 | Ahiru no ko | Short Film | 1932 | Extant |
| Tonpei and Sarukichi | 豚平と猿吉 | Tonpei to Sarukichi | Short Film | 1932 | Extant |
| A Day after a Hundred Years | 百年後の或る日 | Hyakunengo no aruhi | Short Film | 1933 | Extant |
| General of the Swamp | 沼の大将 | Numa no Taishou | Short Film | 1933 | Extant |
| Larks' Moving Day | 雲雀の宿替 | Hibari no Yadogae | Short Film | 1933 | Extant |
| Preventing Tuberculosis | 結核豫防 | Kekkakuyobo | Short Film | 1933 | Extant |
| Private 2nd Class Norakuro: The Training (Note: One film strip was used for these two short films featuring "Norakuro".) | のらくろ二等兵 演習の巻 | Norakuro Nitouhei: Enshuu no Maki | Short Film | 1933 | Extant |
| Private 2nd Class Norakuro: The Drill | のらくろ二等兵 教練の巻 | Norakuro Nitouhei: Kyouren no Maki | Short Film | 1933 | Extant |
| Rascal Racoon | 紙芝居 いたづら狸の卷 | Kamishibai Itazuratanuki no maki | Short Film | 1933 | Extant |
| Sanko and the Octopus: A Fight Over a Fortune | 三公と蛸～百万両珍騒動 | Sanko to Tako: Hyakuman-ryo Chinsodo | Short Film | 1933 | Extant |
| The Monkey's Big Catch | お猿の大漁 | Osaru no Tairyou | Short Film | 1933 | Extant |
| The Three Fearless Frogs | 蛙三勇士 | Kaeru sanyushi | Short Film | 1933 | Extant |
| World of Power and Women | 力と女の世の中 | Chikara to Onna no Yo no Naka | Short Film | 1933 | Lost film |
| Yoshichiro Salutes | まんが劇 與七郎の敬禮 | Mangageki Yoshichiro no keirei | Short Film | 1933 | Extant |
| A Fox and a Tanuki in Rivalry | 動絵狐狸達引 | Ugoki-e Kori no Tatehiki | Short Film | 1933 | Extant |
| Corporal Norakuro | のらくろ伍長 | Norakuro Gochou | Short Film | 1934 | Extant |
| Kamishibai Kintaro | 紙芝居 金太郎の卷 | Kamishibai Kintaro no maki | Short Film | 1934 | Extant |
| Hyoei and Heibei's Tengu Hunt | 天狗退治 | Tengu Taiji | Short Film | 1934 | Extant |
| Princess of the Moon Palace | 月の宮の王女様 | Tsuki no Miya no Oujo-sama | Short Film | 1934 | Extant |
| Sankichi the Monkey: Shock Troops | お猿の三吉 突撃隊 | Osaru no Sankichi: Totsugeki Tai no Kan | Short Film | 1934 | Extant |
| Sankichi and Osayo A Genroku Romance | 元禄恋模様 三吉とおさよ | Genrokukoimoyo Sankichi to Osayo | Short Film | 1934 | Extant |
| Spring Comes to Ponsuke | ポン助の春 | Ponsuke no haru | Short Film | 1934 | Extant |
| The Dance of the Chagamas/The Teakettle Marching Song | 茶釜音頭 | Chagama Ondo | Short Film | 1934 | Extant |
| The Gang and Dancer | ギャングと踊り子 | Gyangu to Odoriko | Short Film | 1934 | Unknown |
| Toy Box Series Episode 3: Picture Book 1936 | オモチャ箱シリーズ第3話 絵本1936年 | Omocha-Bako Series, Dai-3-Wa: Ehon 1936-nen | Short Film | 1934 | Extant |
| An Expression | AN EXPRESSION(表現) | An Expression, Hyogen | Short Film | 1935 | Extant |
| Cowardly Samurai Squad | 弱虫珍選組 | Yowamushi Chinsengumi | Short Film | 1935 | Extant |
| Danemon Ban – The Monster Exterminator | 證城寺の狸囃子 塙団右衛門 | Ban Danemon – Shojoji no tanuki-bayashi | Short Film | 1935 | Extant |
| Ninja Fireball in Edo | 忍術火の玉小僧～江戸の巻 | Ninjutsu Hinotama Kozou: Edo no Maki | Short Film | 1935 | Extant |
| Private 1st Class NoraKuro | のらくろ一等兵 | Norakuro Ittohei | Short Film | 1935 | Extant |
| Private 2nd Class NoraKuro | のらくろ二等兵 | Norakuro Nitouhei | Short Film | 1935 | Extant |
| Propagate | PROPAGATE(開花) | Propagate, Kaika | Short Film | 1935 | Extant |
| Rhythm | RHYTHM(リズム) | Rhythm, Rizumu | Short Film | 1935 | Extant |
| Ta-chan's Underwater Adventure | ターチャンの海底旅行 | Tāchan no kaitei ryoko | Short Film | 1935 | Extant |
| The Hare in Inaba | いなばの国の兎さん | Inabanokuni no usagisan | Short Film | 1935 | Extant |
| Tiny Chibisuke's Big Adventure | 一寸法師〜ちび助物語 | Issunboushi: Chibisuke Monogatari | Short Film | 1935 | Extant |
| Why is the Sea Water Salty? | 海の水はなぜからい | Umi no Mizu Hanaze Karai | Short Film | 1935 | Extant |
| A Night at the Bar | 居酒屋の一夜 | Izakaya no Ichiya | Short Film | 1936 | Extant |
| Chinkoroheibei and the Treasure Box | ちんころ平平玉手箱 | Chinkoroheibei to tamatebako | Short Film | 1936 | Extant |
| Mabo's Big Race | マー坊の大競争 | Mabo no Daikyoso | Short Film | 1936 | Extant |
| Mabo's Tokyo Olympics | マー坊の東京オリンピック大会 | Mabo no Tokyo Olympic Taikai | Short Film | 1936 | Unknown |
| Mt. Kachikachi | 新説カチカチ山 | Shinsetsu Kachi Kachi Yama | Short Film | 1936 | Extant |
| My Big Emergency | おいらの非常時 | Oirano hijoji | Short Film | 1936 | Extant |
| Saturn | 土星 | Dosei | Short Film | 1936 | Unknown |
| Taro's Early Training Days | 日の丸太郎～武者修行の巻 | Hinomaru Tarou: Musha Shugyou no Maki | Short Film | 1936 | Extant |
| Taro's Monster Hunt | 古寺のおばけ騒動 | Furudera no Obake-soudou | Short Film | 1936 | Extant |
| Taro's Training Days | 日の丸太郎 武者修行 | Hinomaru Tarou: Shashi | Short Film | 1936 | Unknown |
| The Monkey Fleet | お猿の艦隊 | Osaru no Kantai | Short Film | 1936 | Extant |
| The Sparrows' Lodge | 雀のお宿 | Suzume no Oyado | Short Film | 1936 | Extant |
| The Sun and the Frogs | お日様と蛙 | Ohi-sama to Kaeru | Short Film | 1936 | Extant |
| Mabo's Boy Aviation Squadron | マー坊の少年航空兵 | Mabo no Shonen Koukuuhei | Short Film | 1937 | Extant |
| The Making of a Color Animation | 色彩漫画の出來る迄 | Shikisaimanga no dekirumade | Short Film | 1937 | Extant |
| The Missing Dumpling | だんごの行方 | Dango no yukue | Short Film | 1937 | Unknown |
| Eagles | 鷲 | Arawashi | Short Film | 1938 | Unknown |
| Mabo as Tokichiro Kinoshita | マー坊の木下藤吉郎 | Mabo no Kinoshita Toukichiro | Short Film | 1938 | Extant |
| NoraKuro's Tiger Hunt | のらくろ虎退治 | Norakuro tora taiji | Short Film | 1938 | Extant |
| Sky Eagles | 空の荒鷲 | Sora no arawashi | Short Film | 1938 | Unknown |
| Taro Overseas | 海國太郎 新日本島萬歳 | Kaikoku Taro Shin Nihon-jima Banzai | Short Film | 1938 | Extant |
| Tekusuke Monogatari | テク助物語 | Tekusuke Monogatari | Short Film | 1938 | Extant |
| The Aerial Battle over Shanghai | 上海上空での空中戦 | Sora no Shanghai Sensen | Short Film | 1938 | Unknown |

== Notable births ==
- November 3, 1928 – Osamu Tezuka, manga artist, cartoonist, animator.
- October 16, 1933 – Nobuyo Ōyama, voice actress.
- July 20, 1934 – Kazuya Tatekabe, voice actor.
- October 2, 1935 – Noriko Ohara, voice actress.
- October 29, 1935 – Isao Takahata, director, screenwriter, producer.
- November 15, 1935 – Kaneta Kimotsuki, voice actor.
- October 25, 1936 – Masako Nozawa, voice actress.

== See also ==
- List of anime by release date (1939–1945)
- List of anime by release date (1946–1959)
- List of years in animation
- History of anime
- Cinema of Japan
- Kamishibai
