= Katsudō Shashin =

1907 fragment of animated film speculated to be the oldest work of animation in Japan

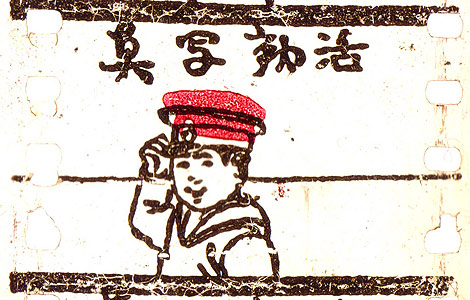
A frame of the three-second Katsudō Shashin, date and creator unknown

Katsudō Shashin (活動写真; lit. 'motion picture'), sometimes called the Matsumoto fragment, is a Japanese animated filmstrip from the Meiji era that is the oldest known work of animation from Japan. Its creator is unknown. Evidence suggests it was made somewhere between 1905 and 1912, so it may predate the earliest displays of Western animated films in Japan. It was discovered in a collection of films and projectors in Kyoto in 2005.

The three-second filmstrip depicts a boy who writes "活動写真", removes his hat, and bows. The frames were stencilled in red and black using a device for making magic lantern slides, and the filmstrip was fastened in a loop for continuous play.

== Description ==
Katsudō Shashin

Katsudō Shashin consists of a series of cartoon images on fifty frames of a celluloid strip and lasts three seconds at sixteen frames per second. It depicts a young boy in a sailor suit who writes the kanji characters "活動写真" (katsudō shashin, "moving picture" or "Activity photo") from right to left, then turns to the viewer, removes his hat, and bows. Katsudō Shashin is a provisional title for the film, whose actual title is unknown.

Unlike in traditional animation, the frames were not produced by photographing the images, but rather were impressed onto film using a stencil. This was done with a kappa-ban, (Note: 合羽版 kappa-ban; the printing process was called kappa-zuri (合羽刷り)) a device for stencilling magic lantern slides. The images were in red and black on a strip of 35 mm film (Note: The filmstrip has since shrunk to 33.5 mm.) whose ends were fastened in a loop for continuous viewing.

== Background ==
=== Imported animation projectors ===
Early printed animation films for optical toys such as the zoetrope predate projected film animation. German toy manufacturer Gebrüder Bing presented a cinematograph at a toy festival in Nuremberg in 1898; soon other toy manufacturers sold similar devices. Live-action films for these devices were expensive to make; possibly as early as 1898 animated films for these devices were on sale, and could be fastened in loops for continuous viewing. Imports of these German devices appeared in Japan at least as early as 1904; films for them likely included animation loops.

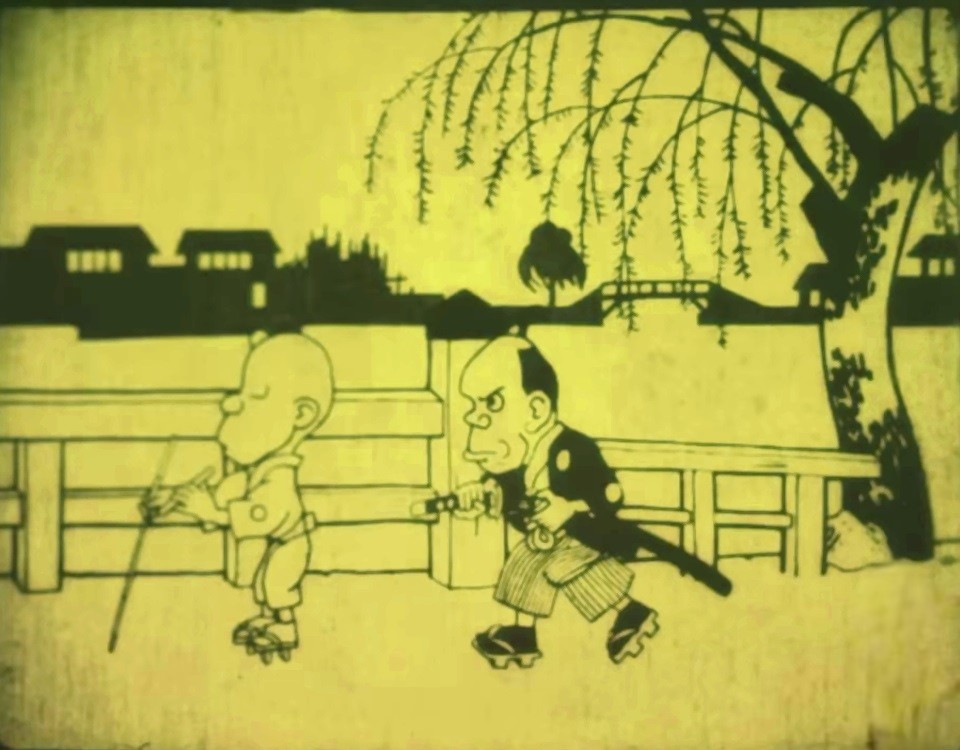
Japanese animated films such as Jun'ichi Kōuchi's Hanawa Hekonai meitō no maki began appearing in theatres in 1917.

Projected film technology arrived in Japan from the West in 1896–97. The earliest display of foreign animation in Japanese theatres that can be dated with certainty is of the French animator Émile Cohl's The Nipper's Transformations (Note: French: Les Exploits de Feu Follet; Japanese: ニッパルの変形 Nipparu no Henkei) (1911), which premièred in Tokyo on 15 April 1912. Works by Ōten Shimokawa, Seitarō Kitayama, and Jun'ichi Kōuchi in 1917 were the first Japanese animated films to reach theatre screens. The films are lost, but a few have been discovered in "toy movie" (Note: 玩具 gangu) versions for viewing at home on hand-cranked projectors; the oldest to survive is Hanawa Hekonai meitō no maki (Note: 塙凹内名刀之巻 Hanawa Hekonai meitō no maki, "Filmreel of Hanawa Hekonai's famous sword") (1917), titled Namakura-gatana in its home version.

== Rediscovery ==
In December 2004, a secondhand dealer in Kyoto contacted Natsuki Matsumoto, (Note: 松本 夏樹 Matsumoto Natsuki, b. 1952) an expert in iconography at the Osaka University of Arts. The dealer had obtained a collection of films and projectors from an old Kyoto family, and Matsumoto arrived the next month to fetch them. The collection included three projectors, eleven 35 mm films, and thirteen glass magic lantern slides.

When Matsumoto found Katsudō Shashin in the collection, the filmstrip was in poor condition. The collection included three Western animated filmstrips; Katsudō Shashin may have been made in imitation of such examples of German or other Western animation. Based on evidence such as the likely manufacture dates of the projectors in the collection, Matsumoto and animation historian Nobuyuki Tsugata (Note: 津堅 信之 Tsugata Nobuyuki, b. 1968) determined the film was most likely made in the late Meiji period, which ended in 1912; (Note: The Meiji period lasted from 1868 to 1912.) historian Frederick S. Litten has suggested c. 1907 as a likely date, and that "a production date before 1905 or after 1912 is unlikely". At the time, movie theatres were rare in Japan; evidence suggests Katsudō Shashin was mass-produced to be sold to wealthy owners of home projectors. The creator of the filmstrip remains unknown; to Matsumoto, the relatively poor quality and low-tech printing technique indicate it was likely from a smaller company.

The discovery was widely covered in Japanese media. Given its speculated date of creation, the film would have been contemporary to—or even have predated—early animated works by Cohl and the American animators J. Stuart Blackton and Winsor McCay. The newspaper Asahi Shimbun acknowledged the importance of the discovery of Meiji-period animation, but expressed reservations about placing the film in the genealogy of Japanese animation, writing that it is "controversial that [Katsudō Shashin] should even be called animation in the contemporary sense".

== See also ==
- Cinema of Japan
- History of animation
- History of anime
- List of rediscovered films
- List of anime by release date (pre-1939)
