= List of lost or unfinished animated films =

The following is a list of lost or unfinished animated films.

== 1890s ==
Year	Film	Director	Country	Notes
1892	Un bon bock	Émile Reynaud	France	Painted in 1888, it was first screened on 28 October 1892 using the Théâtre Optique process, which allowed him to project a hand-painted colored film, before the invention of cinematograph. No copy exists, as Reynaud threw all but two of his picture bands into the Seine River as he was suffering from depression at that time.

== 1900s ==
Year	Film	Director	Country	Notes
1908	The Humpty Dumpty Circus	J. Stuart Blackton and Albert E. Smith	United States	Claimed by Smith to be the first film to use stop motion animation, though the claim has been disputed.

== 1910s ==
Year	Film	Director	Country	Notes
1917	Kaiser	Álvaro Marins	Brazil	A short film considered the first cartoon produced in Brazil.
1917	Imokawa Mukuzo Genkanban no Maki	Ōten Shimokawa	Japan	Once considered to be the first professional Japanese animated film ever made.
1917	El Apóstol	Quirino Cristiani	Argentina	Historians consider it the world's first animated feature film. The film was destroyed in a 1926 fire in Valle's studio.
1918	Urashima Tarō	Seitaro Kitayama	Japan	Was thought to have been discovered at a flea market at the Shitennō-ji temple in Osaka in 2007, but the discovered film later turned out to be another unknown work because a plot description and a series of stills of the 1918 film that differed considerably from the discovered film were found in a contemporary magazine.
1918	Sin dejar rastros	Quirino Cristiani	Argentina	A feature film using cutout animation.

== 1920s ==
Year	Film	Director	Country	Notes
1922	Die Grundlagen der Einsteinschen Relativitäts-Theorie	Hanns Walter Kornblum	Germany	A partly animated documentary film created with the goal of bringing Einstein's theory of relativity to the broad public. Part of the film was used to create Max Fleischer's The Einstein Theory of Relativity. As part of the research carried out by the 3sat station, an English copy of the film was filmed in 2005 with the British Film Institute, which was provided with English and English language interludes and "speech bubbles". However, the original version of the film is lost.
1923	Martha	Walt Disney	United States	A short film made as part of the Laugh-O-Grams series. It is the only film in the Laugh-O-Gram series that is presumed lost.
1923	Firpo-Dempsey	Quirino Cristiani	Argentina	A 1923 animated short, directed by Quirino Cristiani. It is a parody of the boxing match between Jack Dempsey and Argentine boxer Luis Ángel Firpo. At the time the picture was very popular with Argentinean audiences.
1926	Uproar in the Studio	Wan Laiming and Wan Guchan	China	The short film helped the Wan brothers become recognized as the pioneers of the animation industry in China.
1928	The Prince and the Swan Fairy; Királyfi és a Hattyútündér	János Halász	Hungary	One of Hungary's earliest animated films. Only a few fragments of this experimental animation remain.

== 1930s ==
Year	Film	Director	Country	Notes
1931	Peludópolis	Quirino Cristiani	Argentina	The film was released with a Vitaphone sound-on-disc synchronization system soundtrack, making the film generally credited as the first animated feature film with sound.
1933	Chikara to Onna no Yo no Naka	Kenzō Masaoka	Japan	The first Japanese anime of any type to feature voiceovers.
1933–36	The Tale of the Priest and of His Workman Balda	Mikhail and Vera Tsekhanovskaya	Soviet Union	Would have been the Soviet Union's first traditionally animated feature film, but it was abandoned shortly before its completion due to various production difficulties. Most of the film was lost in World War II, with only two and a half minutes surviving.
1936	The Adventures of Pinocchio	Raoul Verdini Umberto Spano	Italy	Was supposed to be Italy's first animated feature, but it was never finished and is now thought to be lost. Only the script and a few still images survive.
1936–39	St. Francis: Dreams and Nightmares	Berthold Bartosch	France	Berthold Bartosch worked on this feature film in Paris until he fled the city in anticipation of Nazi occupation during World War II. He left the unfinished film at the Cinémathèque Française upon fleeing, but it was destroyed during the occupation. Less than 30 minutes of the film had been completed when it was destroyed. Only a few images survive.

== 1960s ==
Year	Film	Director	Country	Notes
1960s–1990s	The Thief and the Cobbler	Richard Williams	U.S./U.K./Canada	Film was taken away from director Richard Williams and released as The Princess and the Cobbler in South Africa and Australia and Arabian Knight in North America; heavily edited versions with much of the already-filmed footage cut out. Unofficial restorations of the original film are available.

== 1970s ==
Year	Film	Director	Country	Notes
1970s–1980s	The Works	Lance Williams	US	It was meant to be the first computer-animated feature but was never completed.
1979	Biag ni Lam-ang (transl. "The Life of Lam-ang")	Nonoy Marcelo	Philippines	Due to on-air primarily on television, it was never shown in promotional ads and still images prior in later decades. The only exception that still exists is the 2005 book Huling Ptyk: Da Art of Nonoy Marcelo.

== 1980s ==
Year	Film	Director	Country	Notes
1983	Roy del espacio	Hector López Carmona, Rafael Ángel Gil and Ulises Pérez Aguirre	Mexico	One of the first feature-length Mexican animated films ever made. Only still images from the film are known to survive.
1986	Train Arrival; Прибытие поезда (Pribytiye poyezda)	Aleksandr Tatarskiy	Soviet Union	A watercolor-animated feature film begun in 1986 by Aleksandr Tatarskiy – part of the reason for the formation of PILOT Studio, the first private animation studio in the U.S.S.R. About 40 minutes were finished before hyper-inflation hit Russia in the economic crisis of the late 1990s. The unfinished film was highly praised by several masters of Russian animation who saw it (including Fyodor Khitruk, Yuriy Norshteyn, Eduard Nazarov, Igor Kovalyov and others) before the film materials were lost to three consecutive floods in late 2005.
1989	Sa Paligid-ligid (transl. "Everywhere")	N/A	Philippines	Like Biag ni Lam-ang, it was on-air primarily on television and never shown in promotional ads and still images prior in later decades.

== 1990s ==
Year	Film	Director	Country	Notes
1991	Treasures under a mountain or The Hobbit / Сокровища под Горой	Roman Mitrofanov	Russia	1991: The Argus International Animation Studio began to work on this animated movie, based on The Hobbit by J.R.R. Tolkien, but soon after the dissolution of the Soviet Union, the project was canceled, and only six minutes were completed.
1997	Adarna: The Mythical Bird	Geirry A. Garccia	Philippines	A 1997 Philippine animated musical fantasy film based on the 19th century corrido commonly titled Ibong Adarna (lit. 'Adarna Bird'), it is the first full-length theatrical animated film produced in the Philippines. In later years, the film fell into obscurity due to negative reviews controversy over its similarities between the film and Disney Renaissance, leaving the film unreleased.

== 2000s ==
Year	Film	Director	Country	Notes
2000	CyberWorld	Colin Davies Elaine Despins	United States	A 2000 American 3D animated anthology film shown in IMAX and IMAX 3D, presented by Intel. The film was cited as the first 3D animated film presented in IMAX, as presented on its website. There are no plans to release the film on home video as of 2025.
2009–2011	Yellow Submarine	Robert Zemeckis	United States	The CGI remake of the 1968 animated Beatles classic film was canceled following the closure of ImageMovers Digital and the poor box-office results of that studio's last film Mars Needs Moms. Zemeckis considered shopping the remake around to other studios before he gave up on the project.

== 2010s ==
Year	Film	Director	Country	Notes
2011–2012	The Power of Zhu/The Secret of Zhu/Journey to GloE		US/Canada	Cepia LLC created The Dream Garden Company for 4 films with distribution by Universal Pictures. On September 27, 2011, the ZhuZhu Pets franchise first full-length feature film Quest for Zhu was released straight-to-DVD. A second full-length feature film, The Power of Zhu, probably in the works and has a trailer, potentially being released on DVD sometime in 2012 as well as a third film The Secret of Zhu that featured the voices of Brad Garrett and Ken Jeong and fourth film Journey to GloE. However, as of February 2014, no other films or even plans for films have been released for The Power of Zhu, although it was completed and was "secretly distributed" to TV stations in France and Brazil under the title Amazing Adventures of Zhu.
2010s	Poe	Michael Sporn	US	Animator Michael Sporn was producing and directing an animated feature based on the life of Edgar Allan Poe when he died in January 2014.
2010s	MagicBox Tamil		India	Some videos were lost media, like Uyir Ezhutukal with examples, 4 words, and so on.
2016 - 2022	ChuChu TV	Vinoth Chandar	India	In various children's short films, like The Colors Song Collection, the Black Color Song was incomplete in 2016. Some languages, such as Tamil, Kannada, and Bengali, are incomplete. In Tamil, only blue and green are known to have survived, and the others are now lost. In Bangla, the entire color song is lost, and in Kannada, some colors are partially incomplete; only red, orange, and blue remain. Also, ChuChu TV Fun Zone's first color is about red, but 'find the red object' is forgotten.
2017-2024	Yuri on Ice the Movie: Ice Adolescence	Sayo Yamamoto	Japan	A film follow-up for the 2016 anime TV series Yuri on Ice, it was announced in 2017. In 2019, it was announced that the film was delayed. In 2020, a trailer for the film was released. The film was officially announced as being canceled in April 2024.

== 2020s ==
Year	Film	Director	Country	Notes
2020	Kukuriraige: Sanxingdui Fantasy	Fumikazu Satou	Japan	Originally set for release on February 7, 2020, alongside the Jewelpet Attack Travel! anime film, it was eventually delayed indefinitely due to production issues. Attack Travel! would later get a standalone release during a Niconico livestream on May 14, 2022. During that livestream, it was confirmed that Kukurirauge would not be released at any point in the foreseeable future.
2022	Scoob! Holiday Haunt	Bill Haller and Michael Kurinsky	United States	Originally scheduled for a December 2022 release on HBO MAX, it was canceled by Warner Bros. Discovery in August 2022, citing cost-cutting measures and a refocus on theatrical films rather than creating projects for streaming.
2024	Jodie			MTV Entertainment Studios shelved the completed television film in March 2024 instead of airing it on Comedy Central. The company has let the creators attempt to shop it to other studios.

== See also ==
- List of animated films
- List of lost films
