= 1917 in animation =

Events in 1917 in animation.

== Films released ==
- Unknown date – The Dinosaur and the Missing Link: A Prehistoric Tragedy (United States)
- 19 January - Mr. Adequate Stalks Again (United States)
- 22 January – Kaiser (Brazil)
- 4 February:
  - Colonel Heeza Liar On The Jump (United States)
  - Throwing the Bull (United States)
- 11 March – Roses and Thorns (United States)
- 19 March – Colonel Heeza Liar, Spy Dodger (United States)
- 27 March - The Adventures of Izzy - Leprechaun Yard (United States)
- April – Imokawa Mukuzo Genkanban no Maki (Japan)
- 12 April – Robbers and Thieves (United States)
- 29 April – The Cook (United States)
- 1 May - The Adventures of Izzy - The Father Intervenes (United States)
- 7 May – Farmer Al Falfa's Wayward Pup (United States)
- 27 May – Moving Day (United States)
- June – Some Barrier (United States)
- 24 June – All Is Not Gold That Glitters (United States)
- 29 June - The Adventures of Izzy - To the Moon (United States)
- 30 June – Namakura Gatana (Japan)
- July – His Trial (United States)
- 2 August - The Adventures of Izzy - Apples in the Face (United States)
- 5 August – A Krazy Katastrophe (United States)
- 20 August – Colonel Heeza Liar's Temperance Lecture (United States)
- 30 October - The Adventures of Izzy - Hallowing Eves (United States)
- 9 November – El Apóstol (Argentina)
- 14 December - The Adventures of Izzy - Izzy the Winter Soldier (United States)

== Births ==
=== January ===
- January 11: Margaret Wright, American actress (voice of Casey Junior in Dumbo), (d. 1999).
- January 24: Ernest Borgnine, American actor (voice of Carface in All Dogs Go to Heaven 2 and All Dogs Go to Heaven: The Series, Mermaid Man in SpongeBob SquarePants, himself in The Simpsons episode Boy-Scoutz 'n the Hood), (d. 2012).

=== March ===
- March 12:
  - Millard Kaufman, American screenwriter (co-creator of Mr. Magoo), (d. 2009).
  - Werner Klemke, German animator, illustrator and comics artist (worked as an animator in the late 1930s), (d. 1994).

=== April ===
- April 8: John Whitney, American animator, composer and inventor (Five Film Exercises, co-animated the opening sequence of Vertigo), (d. 1995).
- April 9: Rolf Kauka, German comics artist and film director (Fix and Foxi), (d. 2000).
- April 15: Hans Conried, American actor (voice of George Darling and Captain Hook in Peter Pan, Snidely Whiplash in Dudley Do-Right, Wally Walrus in Woody Woodpecker), (d. 1982).
- April 17: Martha Sigall, American animator, inker and painter (Warner Bros. Cartoons), (d. 2014).
- April 18: Warren Batchelder, American animator (Warner Bros. Cartoons, DePatie-Freleng, Peanuts special), (d. 2007).
- April 19: Ge Ge Pearson, American actress (second voice of Crusader Rabbit in Crusader Rabbit), (d. 1975).

=== May ===
- May 1: Fyodor Khitruk, Russian animator and film director (The Story of a Crime, Film, Film, Film, Winnie-the-Pooh, O, Sport, You - the Peace!), (d. 2012).
- May 7: David Tomlinson, English actor, singer and comedian (portrayed George Banks in Mary Poppins, Professor Emelius Brown in Bedknobs and Broomsticks, Sir John and voice of Polar Bear in The Water Babies), (d. 2000).
- May 11: Dean Elliott, American composer (Chuck Jones, DePatie-Freleng Enterprises, Ruby-Spears Productions), (d. 1999).
- May 16: Hal Seeger, American animator, comics writer and comics artist (Fleischer Studios, Batfink, Milton the Monster), (d. 2005).
- May 23: Tatiana Riabouchinska, Russian ballerina (co-served as a dance model in the Dance of the Hours segment in Fantasia and Two Silhouettes segment in Make Mine Music), (d. 2000).

=== June ===
- June 2: Brice Mack, American film director and painter (Walt Disney Company), (d. 2008).
- June 24: Wilma Baker, American animator (Walt Disney Company), (d. 2016).

=== July ===
- July 16: Bill Woodson, American actor (narrator in Super Friends), (d. 2017).
- July 17:
  - Phyllis Diller, American actress and comedian (voice of the Queen in A Bug's Life, Thelma Griffin in Family Guy, the Monster's Mate in Mad Monster Party?, the White Queen in Alice Through the Looking Glass, Grandma Neutron in The Adventures of Jimmy Neutron, Boy Genius, the Sugar Plum Fairy in The Nuttiest Nutcracker, Jane Goodair in the Captain Planet and the Planeteers episode "Smog Hog", Suzy Squirrel in the Animaniacs episode "The Sunshine Squirrels", Lillian in The King of the Hill episode "Escape from Party Island", Mitzi in the Hey Arnold! episode "Grandpa's Sister", Mask Scara in The Powerpuff Girls episode "A Made Up Story", herself in The New Scooby-Doo Movies episode "A Good Medium is Rare"), (d. 2012).
  - Gus Arriola, Mexican-American comics artist and animator (Screen Gems, MGM), (d. 2008).

=== August ===
- August 2: Wah Chang, Chinese-American designer, sculptor, animator and animation producer (Pinocchio, Bambi), (d. 2003).
- August 13: Selby Kelly, American comic artist and animator (worked for Walt Disney Animation, Warner Bros. Animation Studios, MGM Animation, Walter Lantz, George Pal's Puppetoons, Hanna-Barbera, Jay Ward, Bill Melendez, Chuck Jones), (d. 2005).
- August 28: Jack Kirby, American comics artist and animator (Fleischer Studios, Hanna-Barbera, Ruby-Spears), (d. 1994).
- August 29: Isabel Sanford, American actress and comedian (voice of Betsy in the Wait Till Your Father Gets Home episode "Help Wanted", Shirley McLoon in the A Pup Named Scooby-Doo episode "A Bicycle Built for Boo!", Bernice in the Pepper Ann episode "Cocoon Gables", voiced herself in The Simpsons episode "Milhouse Doesn't Live Here Anymore"), (d. 2004).

=== September ===
- September 18: June Foray, American actress (voice of Lucifer in Cinderella, Granny and Witch Hazel in Looney Tunes, Knothead and Splinter in Woody Woodpecker, Rocky the Flying Squirrel, Natasha Fatale and Nell Fenwick in Rocky and Bullwinkle, Jokey Smurf in The Smurfs, Grammi Gummi in Disney's Adventures of the Gummi Bears, Magica De Spell and Ma Beagle in DuckTales, Grandmother Fa in Mulan), (d. 2017).
- September 27: Carl Ballantine, American magician, comedian, and actor (voice of Al G. Swindler in Garfield and Friends, Lenny Luntz in the Spider-Man episode "Sins of the Fathers: Chapter 13: Goblin War", Huska in the Freakazoid! episode "Lawn Gnomes: Chapter IV – Fun in the Sun"), (d. 2009).

=== October ===
- October 2: Alma Duncan, Canadian painter, graphic artist, and film director (Kumak the Sleepy Hunter, Hearts and Soles), (d. 2004).

=== November ===
- November 7: Iosif Boyarsky, Russian animator and animated film director (worked for Soyuzmultfilm), (d. 2008).
- November 11: Herbert Klynn, American animator (UPA, founder of Format Films), (d. 1999).

=== December ===
- December 18: Ossie Davis, American actor, director, writer, and activist (voice of Yar in Dinosaur), (d. 2005).
- December 22: Frankie Darro, American actor (voice of Lampwick in Pinocchio), (d. 1976).
- December 30: Wesley Tuttle, American country music singer (did the yodeling in Snow White and the Seven Dwarfs), (d. 2003).
