= Anime song =

Music genre

- Native name: アニメソング
- Other names: Anison (アニソン)
- Stylistic origins: Kayōkyoku
- Cultural origins: 1970s, Japan
- Derivative forms: Denpa song; moe song

Other topics
- J-pop; Japanese rock; Video game music

Anime song (Japanese: アニメソング, Hepburn: anime songu; also shortened to anison (アニソン)) is a genre of music originating from Japanese pop music. Anime songs consist of theme, insert, and image songs for anime, manga, video game, and audio drama CD series, as well as any other song released primarily for the anime market, including music from Japanese voice actors.

The anime song genre was first defined as a musical category in the 1970s. It later gained popularity from the public when mainstream artists begin releasing songs as tie-ins for anime series. By the 1990s, it became redefined as a separate genre when companies began creating record labels that would exclusively produce anime songs for their series and artists. The increase in voice actors beginning in the mid-2000s led to growing market interest in the genre. By the start of the 2020s anime music would achieve international popularity with companies such as Spotify, Crunchyroll, Warner Music Japan and NBCUniversal Entertainment Japan investing in anime-related music. Furthermore, the surge in popularity of anime songs among Gen Z has been fueled by streaming platforms, social-media driven fandom, and club nights.

== History ==
=== 1930–1970: Early influences ===
The Dull Sword (1917), by Jun'ichi Kōuchi, is regarded as the earliest surviving animated film in Japan. Noburō Ōfuji's Kuroi Nyago (1929) is the first Japanese animated work to include music. The film includes characters dancing to a prerecorded song, retroactively seen as the prototype of anime songs.

Following World War II, the 1950s and 1960s saw a revival in entertainment and cultural development. In 1963, Astro Boy premiered and subsequently, the theme song "Theme of Astro Boy" became well-known to the Japanese public due to it being used as the departure song at Takadanobaba Station. The song was also notable due to the lyrics being written by poet Shuntarō Tanikawa.

=== 1970–1980: Growing popularity of anime songs ===
Japan's economic growth in the 1970s led to more cultural development, and people who exclusively sang theme songs for anime were known as "anime song singers." Despite the lack of public appearances from the singers, theme songs from the series Mazinger Z, Space Battleship Yamato, and Candy Candy became known to the Japanese public, even outside of fans who watched the shows. Ichiro Mizuki, Isao Sasaki, and Mitsuko Horie prominently performed anime songs during this period in time. At the same time, Mobile Suit Gundam voice actors Toshio Furukawa and Toru Furuya gained a large female fanbase with through Slapstick, a vocal unit consisting of voice actors from the show meant to its theme songs. While anime theme songs originally used the name and settings from the series of which they were based, this led to the lyrics of anime songs being centered on the characters' thoughts and feelings for more universal appeal and allowing for context outside of the original animated work.

=== 1980–1990: Mainstream recognition ===
At the height of Japan's bubble economy, in the 1980s, musicians outside of the anime industry began performing theme songs for anime. In 1984, the single "Ai Oboete Imasu ka", which was released for Macross under the character Lynn Minmay's name, charted at #7 on the Oricon Weekly Singles Chart. Furthermore, Cat's Eye (1983) received widespread media attention for having Anri, a singer whose activities had no connection to the anime industry, perform its theme songs. Likewise, TM Network, a band who were active outside of the anime industry, received media attention when their 1987 song "Get Wild" was released as the ending song to City Hunter. As a result of the song's popularity, TM Network were invited to the 72nd Kohaku Uta Gassen to perform it. From then on, mainstream artists releasing tie-in songs for anime became common.

=== 1990–2000: In-house production and modernization ===
Following the collapse of the bubble economy in Japan, labels exclusively dedicated to exclusively producing anime songs were formed, most notably King Records' Starchild label. This was in part due the "Being Boom" phenomenon named after Being Inc., which gained a fanbase after their artists Zard and Maki Ohguro released songs that were well-received by the public. Yoko Takahashi, who was part of the Starchild label, released "A Cruel Angel's Thesis" as the theme song for Neon Genesis Evangelion (1995), and the song's popularity led to audiences outside of anime fans to recognize it. In addition, as popular music from Japan shifted from kayōkyoku to J-pop, anime song singers, such as Masami Okui, began incorporating J-pop sounds into their music. Among others, voice actors such as Hekiru Shiina, Mariko Kouda, and Megumi Hayashibara were also active in singing in addition to voice acting. Some voice actors also formed their own groups and perform theme songs to other anime series, such as Minami Takayama with Two-Mix.

=== 2000–2019: Voice actor boom ===
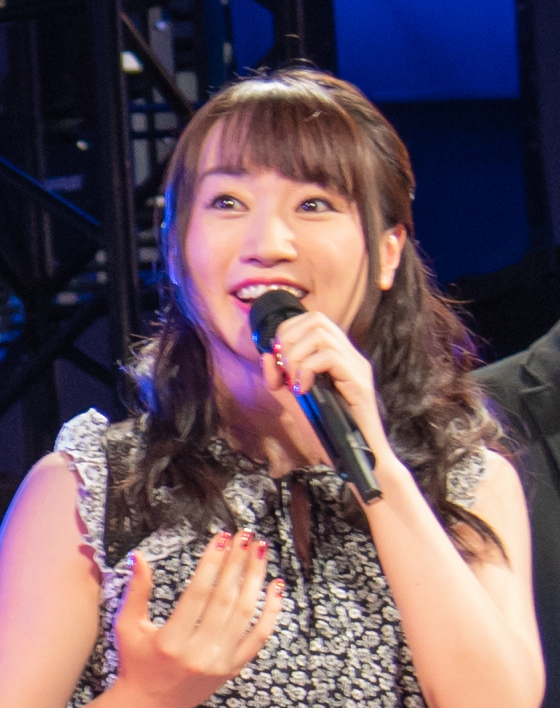
Nana Mizuki (pictured 2018) was the best-selling voice actress in 2011.

During the 2000s, alternative rock began making an entry into anime songs, with Asian Kung-Fu Generation named as an example. As more late-night anime series were being produced, Yui Horie, Yukari Tamura, and Nana Mizuki, who were signed with King Records, were produced and marketed as idol singers and voice actors by the record label. During the mid-2000s, there was a "voice actor boom", in addition to a period known as the "Idol Warring Period", a phenomenon named after a rapid growth in the idol industry. The voice actor boom was attributed to Mizuki's "Eternal Blaze" reaching #2 on the Oricon Weekly Single Charts in 2005, and the release of "Hare Hare Yukai" in 2006 shortly after. "Hare Hare Yukai" also led to the "Haruhi boom" because of the animated dance sequence in the show's ending. In the following years, there was a substantial increase of voice actors in anime, and anime songs as a whole became more widely known to the general public. The anime song industry shifted to recruit young girls who were able to have an "idol" presence, naming Riisa Naka, Koharu Kusumi, and Aya Hirano as examples.

In 2010, Ho-kago Tea Time, a fictional band from the series K-On!, became the first anime characters to receive simultaneous #1 and #2 rankings on the Oricon Weekly Singles Chart with the release of both their singles. In the following years, idol-themed multimedia projects, such as Love Live!, The Idolmaster, and Uta no Prince-sama, became popular. Billboard Japan launched the Billboard Japan Hot Animation chart on December 1, 2010, exclusively for anime and video game music releases.

=== 2020–present: Global expansion ===
Since the 2020s, anime songs have experienced a rapid growth in global online popularity due to their widened availability on music streaming services like Spotify and promotion by fans and artists on social media. In 2020, "Homura", a theme song for animated film Demon Slayer: Kimetsu no Yaiba – The Movie: Mugen Train, rose to number eight on the Billboard Global 200. In 2023, the opening theme of the anime series Oshi no Ko, "Idol" by Yoasobi, topped the Billboard Global Excl. US, becoming the first Japanese song and anime song to do so, "Idol" also topped on the global charts of Apple Music and YouTube Music. In the same year, Kenshi Yonezu's "Kick Back", an opening theme for Chainsaw Man, became the first-ever song with Japanese lyrics to be certified gold by the Recording Industry Association of America (RIAA). In 2025, Yonezu's "Iris Out" became the highest peak at number five on the Global 200.

== Derivatives ==
The anime song genre became the direct influence of genres such as denpa song and moe song.

== Media ==
=== Record labels ===
The following record labels are exclusively for anime song music:

- Animex
- Flying Dog
- King Amusement Creative (formerly Starchild)
- Lantis
- Mages (formerly 5pb Records)
- Sacra Music
- Toho Animation Record
- Good Smile Records

=== Concerts ===
- Animelo Summer Live
- King Super Live (King Amusement Creative)

== Artists ==
=== Performers ===
This is a list of singers and bands who primarily perform anime songs, including groups created from media mix anime projects. This list does not count singers or bands who release incidental songs for the genre, nor group names that the voice actors are credited under solely for performing the theme songs in the anime they are starring in.

==== Soloists ====
- Eir Aoi
- Shouta Aoi
- Kana Hanazawa
- Megumi Hayashibara
- Yui Horie
- Sōichirō Hoshi
- Miyu Irino
- Kanako Itō
- Hironobu Kageyama
- LiSA
- May'n
- Inori Minase
- Mamoru Miyano
- Nana Mizuki
- Hiroko Moriguchi
- Megumi Nakajima
- Yui Ogura
- Machico
- Masami Okui
- Daisuke Ono
- Soma Saito
- Maaya Sakamoto
- Minori Suzuki
- Yoko Takahashi
- Yukari Tamura
- Haruka Tomatsu
- Nao Toyama
- Maaya Uchida
- Yuma Uchida
- Sumire Uesaka
- Kōji Wada
- Zaq

==== Groups ====
- Ali Project
- Aqours
- Angela
- ClariS
- Dialogue
- Egoist
- Garnidelia
- Granrodeo
- Iris
- JAM Project
- Mia Regina
- Oldcodex
- OxT
- Poppin'Party
- Roselia
- Trefle
- TrySail
- Walkure

=== Composers ===
This is a list of songwriters who primarily compose and produce anime songs. This list does not count composers who produce incidental releases for the genre.

- Aki Hata
- Arte Refact
- Elements Garden
  - Noriyasu Agematsu
- Tomoya Tabuchi
- Hidekazu Tanaka

== See also ==
- Animax Anison Grand Prix
