= List of people considered a founder in a humanities field =

Those known as the father, mother, or considered a founder in a humanities field are those who have made important contributions to that field. In some fields several people are considered the founders, while in others the title of being the "father" is debatable.

== Arts ==
Subject	Father / mother	Reason
Abstract art	Hilma af Klint	For "[inventing] an abstract vocabulary blending biomorphic and geometric forms," that predates Wassily Kandisky.
Animation	Lotte Reiniger Margaret J. Winkler	Reiniger: For making The Adventures of Prince Achmed, "[t]he first full-length animation movie of film history." Winkler: For being "one of the earliest female producers of animation, with international hits like the cartoon, Felix the Cat."
Anime	Ōten Shimokawa; Jun'ichi Kōuchi; Seitaro Kitayama	
Australian studio pottery	William Merric Boyd	
Cinematography	Alice Guy-Blaché	For being the first female film director and "among the first to employ techniques like close-ups, hand-tinted color, and synchronized sound. "
Dadaism	Beatrice Wood	For her involvement in the movement, which stemmed from her enjoyment of, upon her own admission, "being subversive."
Danish painting	Nikolaj Abraham Abildgaard	
Fashion	Coco Chanel Jeanne Lanvin Vivienne Westwood	Chanel: For "revolutionizing how [people] dress, she helped form a new ideal of what a fashion brand could be." Lanvin: for founding "one of the oldest French fashion houses in operation today," through which she popularized the robe de style dress. Westwood: For "[selling] the customised Teddy Boy threads that developed into punk... [and with her 1981 Pirate collection changing] the way people looked...[and creating] a new language of clothes."
Modern fashion photography	Norman Parkinson	For taking his models and photoshoots beyond the confines of the studio.
Modern French cooking	Eugénie Brazier	For her Lyonnaise-style of cooking, becoming the first woman to ever hold three Michelin stars and at age 38, the first individual to hold six simultaneously, a record that lasted for 65 years until 1998, which led Curnonsky to deem her as "the greatest chef in the world."
French New Wave cinema	Agnès Varda	For "directing celebrated films including Cléo from 5 to 7, Happiness and The Creatures."
Gothic architecture	Abbot Suger	Built the first Gothic church at the Abbey of St Dennis
Harlem Renaissance (sculpture)	Augusta Savage	For being "a talented sculptor in her own right, [as well as] the first African American wom[a]n to open her own art gallery, the ‘Salon of Contemporary Negro Art’."
Manga	Osamu Tezuka	
Oil painting	Jan van Eyck	For experimenting with the medium to remarkable effect
Photojournalism	Mathew Brady	
Pop art	Richard Hamilton	
New Puerto Rican cuisine	Alfredo Ayala	"[F]or being the manager of a new local gastronomic movement in times of ‘nouvelle cuisine’, which sought to exalt the richness of Puerto Rican cuisine to position it in haute cuisine,"..."[becoming] the best ambassador of the island."
Scottish country dancing	Francis Peacock	
Spanish cuisine	Penelope Casas (Note: Referred to as the "Godmother".) María Mestayer	Casas: For "demonstrating the breadth of regional Spanish cuisine." Mestayer: For being "[a] woman ahead of her time who had to fight against the social prejudices of a classist Spain and faced a civil war from the kitchens."
Stop-motion clay animation	Art Clokey	
Surrealism	André Breton Dorothea Tanning	

== Communication ==
Subject	Father / mother	Reason
Public Relations	Edward Bernays	Author of the book Crystalizing Public Opinion and creator of the Torches of Freedom advertising campaign.
Spam	Gary Thuerk	Penned the first message that advertised the availability of a new model of Digital Equipment Corporation computers to 393 recipients on ARPANET in 1978.

== Education ==
Subject	Father / mother	Life span	Reason
Afghan education	Sakena Yacoobi	(born 1949 or 1950)	For her work through the Afghan Institute of Learning, which "works...to empower women and bring education and health services to poor women and girls in rural and urban areas, serving hundreds of thousands of women and children a year."
American education	Mary McLeod Bethune Horace Mann	(1875–1955) (1796–1859)	Bethune: For her "high standards and...[demonstration] of what educated African Americans could do," through her school, which later became Bethune–Cookman University. Mann: Advocated for common schools and nonsectarian education.
American Catholic education	Mary Elizabeth Lange	(c. 1789–1882)	For founding the first Catholic school in the United States for children of color as well as the first religious community of women of African-American descent.
Argentinian education	Domingo Faustino Sarmiento Juana Paula Manso	(1811–1888) (1819–1875)	Sarmiento: For improving the country's education system. Manso: For educating women and advocating for their equal education.
Costa Rican education	Carmen Lyra	(1888–1949)	For founding the Escuela Maternal ('maternal school'), the first Montessori school in Costa Rica in 1925.
Dominican education	Salomé Ureña	(1850–1898)	For founding "the Instituto de Señoritas ('young ladies' institute'), which became the first center devoted exclusively to the training of teachers," in the Dominican Republic and called as such by Chiqui Vicioso.
Japanese language education in Romania	Angela Hondru	Still living	"[F]or her role in saving Japanese studies from extinction in her country in the 1970s and for her more than 30 years of dedication to the field since then."
Namibian education	Ottilie Abrahams	(1937–2018)	For "[forming] the Namibian National Nationhood Programme, a consortium of NGOs working in the areas of education and agro-ecology."
Nicaraguan education	Josefa Toledo de Aguerri	(1866–1962)	"[F]or her work as a teacher of generations," educating Pinolero children as the "future citizens...[of] tomorrow who will integrate the collectivity of the nation.”
Paraguayan education	Rosa Peña Guanes	(1843–1899)	For founding twenty-four girls' schools and the National Asylum in Paraguay.
Early education in Peru	Emilia Barcia Boniffatti	(1904–1986)	For founding the first preschool in the Peruvian Amazonia.
Puerto Rican education	Jaime Benítez Rexach Celestina Cordero; Rafael Cordero	(1908–2001) (1787–1862) (1790–1868)	Benítez: Called as such by Herman Badillo for "there [being] no man in this country who has done more to bring up the level of educational opportunities to poor people than [him]." Celestina: For founding the first school for girls in Puerto Rico. Rafael: For providing free schooling to the children, regardless of race or social standing.
Saudi Arabian education	Iffat bint Mohammad Al Thunayan	(1916– 2000)	For founding "the Taif model school and the first girl's college in Saudi Arabia."
Tampa education	Electa Lee	(1808–1870)	For "[opening] what is believed to be the first local school," in Tampa.
Washington D. C. education	Myrtilla Miner	(1815–1864)	For "providing a quality education for all children in the District of Columbia regardless of race, creed or class," through her Normal School for Colored Girls, which later became the University of the District of Columbia.
Western Cape education	Helen Zille	(born 1951)	For her "hands-on approach" tenure as Western Cape MEC for Education.

== History ==
Subject	Father / mother	Reason
African-American history	Arturo Alfonso Schomburg	For his "[research and raising] awareness of the great contributions that Afro-Latin Americans and African Americans have made to society,...[being] an important intellectual figure in the Harlem Renaissance [and, over] the years, [collecting] literature, art, slave narratives, and other materials of African history, which were purchased to become the basis of the Schomburg Center for Research in Black Culture, named in his honor, at the New York Public Library (NYPL) branch in Harlem.
Black history	Carter G. Woodson	A founder of The Journal of Negro History in 1916.
Ecclesiastical history	Eusebius of Caesarea	Because of his work in recording the history of the early Christian church
English history	Bede	Ecclesiastical History of the English People
French history	André Duchesne	
Historiography	Ibn Khaldun	Muqaddimah (Prolegomena) (1377)
History	Herodotus; Thucydides	The Histories; History of the Peloponnesian War
History of science	George Sarton	Founded Isis (1912) and wrote Introduction to the History of Science (1927)
Modern history	Leonardo Bruni	
Philosophy of history	Ibn Khaldun	Muqaddimah (Prolegomena) (1377)
Public administration	Woodrow Wilson	"The Study of Administration" in Political Science Quarterly, June 1887.
Puerto Rican history	Salvador Brau Alejandro Tapia y Rivera	

== Justice ==
Subject	Father / mother	Reason
Criminal identification	Alphonse Bertillon	Created a database for criminals
Fingerprinting	Juan Vucetic	

== Language and literature ==
Subject	Father / mother	Reason
Modern African literature	Flora Nwapa	For "[setting] the stage for the emergence of female writers in Nigeria and other African countries," by being "the first African woman to publish a book in English."
American folklore	Richard Dorson	
American literature	Mark Twain Ralph Waldo Emerson	Mark Twain is often attributed to being one of the first authors to write in American vernacular and address major issues such as race and slavery, particularly through the wilted of southern Americans. Ralph Waldo Emerson is credited with beginning the nation's literary renaissance and original philosophical ideas with Transcendentalism.
American novel	Susanna Rowson	For writing one of the "best-selling novels of the time...Charlotte, A Tale of Truth."
Canadian Indigenous literature	E. Pauline Johnson	For "her impact of Indigenous writers" due in part to "[writing] a critique of the treatment of First Nations women in her article: "A Strong Race Opinion: the Indian Girl in Modern Fiction," in which she protested the obvious racism in the novels about First Nations women."
Canadian literature	Margaret Atwood Margaret Laurence	Atwood: For "[seeming] capable of embracing and exposing the truth of the darkness that lurks in the shadows of our world[, s]he and her work are as relevant as ever." Laurence: For "having given eloquent voice to the Manitoba prairie in her “Manawaka” series, [as well as speaking] for the tribes of all humankind—women, the old, and the oppressed everywhere."
Canadian poetry	Isabella Valancy Crawford	For being the first to attempt the "arduous intellectual journey," that "her verse [must trek the wide] distance to be traversed from the servile copy to the work which, though it may originate in a fertile hint of method or suggestion of thought in some foreign source, is still the authentic utterance of a single mind."
Costa Rican poetry	Eunice Odio	For being "the country’s most significant international literary presence."
English literature	Geoffrey Chaucer Frances Burney	Chaucer: For writing The Canterbury Tales. Burney: For being considered as such by Virginia Woolf, in part "for advancing the popularity of the courtship novel and the possibility of women being considered as novelists of worth."
English poetry	Geoffrey Chaucer	
Epic poetry	Homer	
American film criticism	Pauline Kael	For being "probably the most qualified critic in the world," per Jerry Lewis.
Finnish written language	Mikael Agricola	
German literature	Gotthold Ephraim Lessing	
Grammar	Pāṇini	Wrote the Ashtadhyayi
Greek tragedy	Aeschylus	
Harlem renaissance	Alta Douglas (née Sawyer) Jessie Redmon Fauset Zora Neale Hurston	Douglas: For her "death had a special meaning… Alta and Aaron Douglas had formed the warm human center of a group of gifted black young men and women who had come together for the first time in New York… her passing marked definitely 'the closing of the ring' on the Harlem Renaissance," as considered by Arnold Rampersad. Fuaset: For being "a teacher, the Literary Editor of The Crisis, and the author the celebrated There is Confusion, Fauset showed serious promise as a leading and impactful voice," as well as "selecting the works of...Langston Hughes, Countee Cullen, Arna Bontemps, Claude McKay, Georgia Douglas Johnson, Mary Effie Lee and Jean Toomer for publication."
Modern Hebrew language	Eliezer Ben Yehuda	
Horror	Mary Shelley	Wrote Frankenstein
Italian language	Dante Alighieri	
Italian literature	Dante Alighieri	
Indology	Al-Biruni	
Letters (messages)	Francis I of France	
Linguistics (early)	Pāṇini	Wrote the Ashtadhyayi
Linguistics (modern)	Ferdinand de Saussure; Noam Chomsky	
Modern fantasy literature	J. R. R. Tolkien	
Modernist literature	Gertrude Stein	For the "[incorporation of the] stream-of-consciousness and experimental narrative techniques," into her work.
Novel	Homer	
Nuyorican literature	Esmeralda Santiago	For writing When I Was Puerto Rican, considered by Oprah's Book Club as "one of the “Best Memoirs of a Generation”."
Puerto Rican literature	Concha Meléndez Alejandro Tapia y Rivera	
Science fiction	Octavia E. Butler (Note: Referred to as the "Queen Mother".) Ursula K. Le Guin (Note: Referred to as the "Queen Mother".) Mary Shelley Lucian of Samosata Jules Verne H. G. Wells	
Science fiction magazine	Hugo Gernsback	
Spanish language	Antonio de Nebrija	
Spanish literature	Carmen Balcells Miguel de Cervantes	Balcells: For being the literary agent of Spanish-language authors from Spain and Latin America, including six Nobel Prize–winning authors and one of the main promoters of the Latin American Boom. Cervantes: For writing Don Quixote.
Spanish travel literature	Egeria	For writing Itinerarium Egeriae ("Travels of Egeria"), the first record of a Christian pilgrimage in the 4th century.
Urdu	Maulvi Abdul Haq	
Venezuelan literature	José Antonio Ramos Sucre	
Venezuelan poetry	José Antonio Ramos Sucre	

== Law ==
Subject	Father / mother	Reason
Civil law	Justinian I	
Legal writing education	Marjorie D. Rombauer	For "[writing] the first legal writing textbook, Legal Problem Solving: Analysis, Research, and Writing in 1970," and through her "[teaching] at the University of Washington School of Law for over thirty years [as] the first non-librarian, tenured female faculty member," her "works on legal problem solving, research, writing, and analysis informed generations of law students."
European patent law	Kurt Haertel	
International law	Alberico Gentili; Francisco de Vitoria; Hugo Grotius	For speculating on human rights and the proper relations that ought to exist between nations
Russian jurisprudence	Semyon Efimovich Desnitsky	Russian social and political theorist (18th century)
United States Constitution	James Madison	He played a large role in its drafting and ratification. One of the authors of The Federalist. Also drafter of the Bill of Rights.

== Music ==
Subject	Father / mother	Reason
American music	Stephen Foster	Recognized internationally for his compositions which are still being performed in various venues. His most notable works include Oh Susanna, Camptown Races and Old Folks at Home.
American piano manufacture	Jonas Chickering	
Blues	Ma Rainey	
Bluegrass music	Bill Monroe	
Chicago blues / electric blues	Muddy Waters	
Contemporary a cappella	Deke Sharon	
Country music	Jimmie Rodgers	
Death metal	Chuck Schuldiner	
Disco	Mel Cheren (Godfather)	
Disco	Giorgio Moroder	
English cathedral music	Thomas Tallis	
Funk	George Clinton (Godfather)	
Gospel music	Thomas A. Dorsey	
Gothic rock	Peter Murphy (Godfather)	
G-Funk	Dr. Dre	
Greek music	Terpander	
Grunge	Neil Young	
Heavy metal	Ozzy Osbourne/Tony Iommi	Both are also known as the "godfathers of heavy metal".
Italo disco	Alexander Robotnick (Godfather)	
Punk rock	Patti Smith (Godmother)	
Jazz	Buddy Bolden; Jelly Roll Morton; Theodore August Metz	
Modern jazz piano	Earl "Fatha" Hines	
Puerto Rican music	Manuel Gregorio Tavárez	
Reggae	Frederick "Toots" Hibbert	
Rock and roll	Chuck Berry Ike Turner	
Rock music in China	Cui Jian	
Soul music	James Brown (Godfather)	
Symphony and string quartet	Joseph Haydn	
Thrash metal	James Hetfield	
Venezuelan music	Simón Díaz Antonio Lauro Vicente Emilio Sojo	

== Performance art ==
Subject	Father / mother	Reason
Kabuki	Izumo no Okuni	
Vogue	Willi Ninja	Godfather

== Philosophy and religion ==
Subject	Father / mother	Reason
Alt-right	Paul Gottfried (Note: Described as the "godfather" of the alt-right) Michelle Malkin (Note: Referred to as the "Den Mother".) Richard B. Spencer	
Anarchism	Mikhail Bakunin Emma Goldman Pierre-Joseph Proudhon	
Antifeminism	Phyllis Schlafly	
Christian asceticism	Syncletica of Alexandria	
Authoritarianism	Indira Gandhi	For her declaration of The Emergency.
Behaviorism	John B. Watson	
Chinese democracy	Wei Jingsheng	
Communism	Karl Marx	
Comparative religion	Max Müller	
Conservatism	Edmund Burke	
Cynicism (school of thought)	Diogenes of Sinope	
Epicureanism	Epicurus	
Epistemology	Xenophanes	
Existentialism	Simone de Beauvoir Søren Kierkegaard	
Fascism	Benito Mussolini Margherita Sarfatti (Note: Referred to as the "Jewish Mother".)	For being "Benito Mussolini's mistress, [becoming] his ideological companion, [planning] the 'March on Rome' with him, [writing] articles in his name, [editing] the Fascist Party organ and [writing] his first official biography."
Faith missions	Anthony Norris Groves	
Feminism	Mary Wollstonecraft	
Humanism	Petrarch	
Islamic logic	Al-Farabi	
Liberalism	John Locke Baruch Spinoza	
American libertarianism	Rose Wilder Lane Isabel Paterson Ayn Rand	Lane: For "reigniting a passion for liberal ideas in her numerous columns alongside her masterwork, The Discovery of Freedom." Paterson: For "[opposing] most of the New Deal programs being instituted by Franklin D. Roosevelt[, advocating] for less government involvement in social and fiscal issues[, and going] on to write "The God of the Machine," a defense of individualism as the source of social and political progress. Rand: For claiming the "libertarians as "plagiarists of [her] ideas.""
Logical positivism	Moritz Schlick	
Methodism	John Wesley	
Moral philosophy	Thomas Aquinas	
Neo-authoritarianism	Xiao Gongqin	
Neoconservatism	Irving Kristol (Godfather)	
Objectivism	Ayn Rand	
Positivism	Clotilde de Vaux	
Protestantism (Lutheranism)	Martin LutherKatharina Zell	Zell: For her "prolific work [been considered] as some of the Reformation period’s exemplary writings."
Religious tolerance	Anne Hutchinson	
Scholasticism	John Scotus Eriugena Lanfranc of Canterbury; Anselm of Canterbury; Peter Abelard	Book: Sic et Non
Scholasticism (Protestant)	Hugo Grotius	
Socialism	Karl Marx; Robert OwenChrista Wolf (Note: Referred to "as a kind of "supermother".")	
Thomism	Thomas Aquinas	
Transcendentalism	Mary Moody Emerson Ralph Waldo Emerson Margaret Fuller Anne Hutchinson Henry David Thoreau	Moody Emerson: for instilling in her nephew to "look within, reflect, but [to] do it with much reading, study." Fuller: For living "her entire life [with] courageous and intellectually brilliant forays into finding better answers, answers tempered by both triumphs and travails." Hutchinson: For being "a healer and a preacher of a gentle, optimistic religion of the heart...[which] culminated in a cultural revolt."
Zionism	Theodor Herzl	
