= Seitarō =

- Gender: Male

Origin
- Origin: Japanese
- Meaning: Different meanings depending on the kanji used

Seitarō, Seitaro or Seitarou (written: 清太郎 or 誠太郎 ) is a masculine Japanese given name. Notable people with the name include:

- Seitarō Gotō (五島 清太郎; 1867–1935), Japanese scientist
- Seitaro Ichinohe (一戸 誠太郎; born 1996), Japanese speed skater
- Seitarō Kitayama (北山 清太郎; 1888–1945), Japanese anime director
- Seitaro Tomisawa (富澤 清太郎; born 1982), Japanese footballer
