= Kitayama Eiga Seisakujo =

Japanese animation studio

Kitayama Eiga Seisakujo (北山映画製作所, Kitayama Movie Factory) was the first true animation studio in Japan. It was founded by Seitaro Kitayama in 1921.

== Animations ==
- Kiatsu to Mizuage Ponpu (Atmospheric pressure and suction pumps) (1921)
- Shokubutsu Seiri: Seishoku no Maki (Plant Physiology: Story of Reproduction) (1922)
- Usagi to Kame (Rabbit and Tortoise) (1924)
