= Noburō Ōfuji =

Japanese film director and animator (1900–1961)

- 大藤 信郎
- Born: June 1, 1900
- Died: July 28, 1961 (aged 61)
- Known for: Animator, film director

Noburō Ōfuji (大藤 信郎, Ōfuji Noburō; June 1, 1900 – July 28, 1961) was a Japanese film director and animator. One of the most notable auteurs of anime (one of the industry's most prestigious awards, the Mainichi Film Awards' Ōfuji Noburō Award, is named after him), he worked primarily with cutout and silhouette animation. He also made a number of films in traditional animation, using then-expensive, imported cels, while his earliest work known to have survived is a live-action/animated film. He trained under Jun'ichi Kōuchi before starting his own company. He is known for his employment of washi, especially the coloured and patterned Edo chiyogami, which gives his films a distinctively Japanese appearance. He was one of the first Japanese animators to earn international recognition for his work.

== Filmography ==
Burglars of "Baghdad" Castle is Ōfuji's "official debut film" and the first animated film made using chiyogami paper.

The Golden Flower (1929)

Will Power (1931)

Kujira (1952)

- Hanamizake (1924)
- Noroma no oyaji (1924)
- Kemurigusa monogatari (煙り草物語) [A Story of Tobacco] (1926)
- Kirigami zaiku Saiyuki: Songoku monogatari (切紙細工 西遊記 孫悟空物語) [The Story of the Monkey King] (1926)
- Baguda-jō no tōzoku (馬具田城の盗賊) [Burglars of "Baghdad" Castle] (1926)
- Kujira (鯨) (1927)
- Mikansen (みかん舩) [A Ship of Oranges] (1927)
- Yaji-Kita jigoku gokuraku (1927)
- Chinsetsu Yoshida goten (珍説吉田御殿) (1928)
- Hoshi (1928)
- Kirinuki urashima (1928)
- Kogane no hana (こがねの花) [The Golden Flower] (1929)
- Usotsuki-jō (1929)
- Kuronyago (1929)
- Jidō shōka eiga: Muramatsuri (村祭) [The Village Festival] (1930)
- Komainu no me (1930)
- Osekisho (お関所) [At the Border Checkpoint] (1930)
- Kokka kimigayo (國歌 君か代) [National Anthem, Kimigayo] (1931)
- Haru no uta (春の唄) [Spring Song] (1931)
- Kokoro no chikara (心の力) [Will Power] (1931)
- Musashiyama to Asashio no chin-zumō (1931)
- Kaeru san-yushi (蛙三勇士) [The Three Fearless Frogs] (1933)
- Numa no taisho (1933)
- Saiyuki (1934)
- San-ba no chō (1934)
- Tengu taiji (1934)
- Chinkoroheibei tamatebako (ちんころ平平玉手箱) [Chinkoroheibei and the Treasure Box] (1936)
- Dosei (1936)
- Dango no yukue (1937)
- Katsura hime (1937)
- Shikisai manga no dekiru made (色彩漫画の出來る迄) [The Making of a Color Animation] (1937)
- Sora no arawashi - Sensen manga (1938)
- Warae yamaotoko (1938)
- Yakko no Takohei: Otomo wa tsuyoi ne (1938)
- Umi no arawashi (1939)
- Kodomo to kōsaku (1941)
- Mare-oki kaisen (1943)
- Kumo no itō (1946)
- Yuki no yo no yume (1947)
- Kuma ni kuwarenu otoko (1948)
- Shaka (釈迦) (1948)
- Taisei shakuson (1949)
- Seisho genso-fu: Adam to Eve (1951)
- Kujira (くじら) (1952)
- Taisei shakuson (1952)
- Hana to chō (1954)
- Kojiki sho: Amano iwato-biraki no maki (1955)
- Yūreisen (幽霊船) (1956)
- Kojiki monogatari dai nihen: Yamatano-orochi taiji (1956)
- Kojiki monogatari: Okuni no mikoto to inaba no usagi (1957)
- Kojiki monogatari: Tenson korin no maki (1958)
- Kojiki monogatari: Koson-ke no mittsuno takara (1959)
- Shaka no shogai (釈迦の生涯) (1961)

== See also ==
- History of anime
- Kenzō Masaoka
