= Urashima Tarō (film) =

- Directed by: Seitaro Kitayama
- Based on: Urashima Tarō
- Release date: February 1918
- Running time: Unknown
- Country: Japan
- Language: Silent

External videos
- A restored version of the unrelated film that was found at the flea market, National Museum of Modern Art, Tokyo

Urashima Tarō (浦島太郎) is a Japanese animated short film produced by Seitaro Kitayama in 1918. The film is an adaptation of a folk tale Urashima Tarō about a fisherman traveling to an underwater world on a turtle. It premiered in February 1918, making it one of the earliest anime films.

It is a lost film; it was thought to have been discovered at a flea market at the Shitennō-ji temple in Osaka in 2007, but the discovered film later turned out to be another unknown work because a plot description and a series of stills of the 1918 film that differed considerably from the discovered film were found in a contemporary magazine.
