= Imokawa Mukuzo Genkanban no Maki =

The Story of the Concierge Mukuzo Imokawa
- Directed by: Ōten Shimokawa
- Production company: Tenkatsu
- Release date: April 1917
- Running time: 5 minutes
- Country: Japan
- Language: Silent

The Story of the Concierge Mukuzo Imokawa (芋川椋三玄関番の巻 or 芋川椋三玄関番之巻, Imokawa Mukuzō Genkanban no Maki) was once considered to be the first professional Japanese animated film ever made. It was made by Ōten Shimokawa in 1917 to be shown in a cinema, in this case, in the Asakusa Kinema Kurabu, a theater in Tokyo managed directly by the film company Tenkatsu. It was preceded by Shimokawa's early work, 凸坊新画帳・名案の失敗 (Dekobō shingachō – Meian no shippai, Bumpy new picture book – Failure of a great plan) and 凸坊新畫帖 芋助猪狩の巻 (Dekobo Shingacho Imosukei no Shishigari no Maki, Convex new picture book Imo Suke boar hunting volume) from January 1917.

== Production ==
In 1916, Tenkatsu, or Tennenshoku Katsudō Shashin Kabushiki Gaisha ("Natural Color Moving Picture Company"), began experimenting with animation with the manga artist Hekoten/Oten Shimokawa. Shimokawa produced the animation by drawing with a chalk on a blackboard, redrawing as necessary to create the animation effect. Mukuzo Imokawa was a manga character that Shimokawa used in his manga.

== See also ==
- List of lost films
- List of lost or unfinished animated films
