= Ōten Shimokawa =

Japanese artist

- Born: Shimokawa Sadanori; May 2, 1892; Miyakojima, Okinawa, Japan
- Died: May 26, 1973 (aged 81); Noda, Chiba, Japan
- Other name: Hekoten Shimokawa
- Occupation: Animator
- Known for: Imokawa Mukuzo Genkanban no Maki

Ōten Shimokawa (or Hekoten Shimokawa) (下川凹天, Shimokawa Ōten; May 2, 1892 – May 26, 1973) was a Japanese artist, considered to be one of the founding artists and pioneers of anime. Little is known of his early personal life, other than that his family moved to the Tokyo area when he was nine years old. Here he began working for Tokyo Puck magazine as a political cartoonist and manga series artist.

At the age of 26, Shimokawa was hired by Tenkatsu Production Company to create a short animated film. Shimokawa used several animation techniques that were, at the time, unique: using chalk or white wax on a dark board background to draw characters, rubbing out portions to be animated and drawing with ink directly onto film, whiting out animated portions. At the time, celluloid cels (rather than modern acetate film) were costly and scarce in Japan, having to be imported. These techniques cut production costs, material costs and completion time.

The resulting film was Imokawa Mukuzo Genkanban no Maki, released in 1917. Though not the earliest animation created in Japan, it is considered to be the first "true" Anime film, as it was the first to be publicly shown in a theater. The film ran only five minutes. As with many animation works created in Japan before the mid-1920s, no trace of the film, or any of Shimokawa's five other short films, has survived.

Shimokawa's animation work was cut short by chronic health problems, and he returned to work as a consultant and editor for other production companies making animated films in the 1930s and 1940s. Not much is known of his later life; indeed, very few works bear mention of his contribution beyond his own personal works.

== Biography ==
Shimokawa was born Shimokawa Sadanori. After his father died in 1898 while serving as a school principal, his family moved to Kagoshima Prefecture, his mother's home region. In 1900, he was taken in by his paternal uncle, an army officer living in Tokyo.

In 1906, after seeing an advertisement for cartoonist training in the magazine Tokyo Puck, Shimokawa became a live-in apprentice of the cartoonist Rakuten Kitazawa, who gave him the pen name "Hekoten". In 1907, on Kitazawa's recommendation he enrolled at Aoyama Gakuin but failed a grade and was expelled after a year; although briefly estranged from Kitazawa over the matter, he continued to study cartooning independently while working for the Army Land Survey Department.

In 1912, when Kitazawa left Tokyo Puck to launch the magazine Rakuten Pack, Shimokawa wrote to him asking to rejoin, and Kitazawa welcomed him back; this began Shimokawa's career as a professional cartoonist. In 1916 he published his first book, Ponchi Shōzō, with forewords by Ippei Okamoto and Jun'ichi Kōuchi and illustrations contributed by 25 leading cartoonists of the day, including Kitazawa.

Later in 1916, the film company Tenkatsu asked the Rakuten Pack company to recommend someone to make an animated film, and Shimokawa was put forward for the job. Around the same time, Jun'ichi Kōuchi was independently producing animation at Kobayashi Shokai and Seitarō Kitayama was doing the same at Nikkatsu; all three are regarded as pioneering founders of Japanese animation.

Shimokawa initially animated by drawing in chalk on a blackboard and photographing the image frame by frame as he erased and redrew parts of it, a technique similar to the one J. Stuart Blackton had used for Humorous Phases of Funny Faces (1906). After his first few films he switched to a method using large numbers of printed background sheets, whiting out portions of each and drawing the animated figures on top before photographing them. His work in animation ended after only a handful of short films: exposure to the studio lighting used for filming damaged his eyesight, and he was hospitalized for a year and a half before leaving Tenkatsu. None of his animated films are known to survive.

Shimokawa subsequently returned to cartooning, contributing caricatures to newspapers including the Osaka Mainichi, Osaka Asahi and Tokyo Nichinichi from 1918. In 1930 he became a staff cartoonist at the Yomiuri Shimbun, where his four-panel comic strip Otoko Yamome no Gan-san, serialized from 1933, made him widely known as a newspaper cartoonist. He moved to Noda, Chiba in 1950 and announced his retirement the following year, after which he devoted himself to studying Buddhist painting until his death in 1973.

== Works ==
- Imokawa Mukuzo Genkanban no Maki (1917)
- Dekobō shingachō – Meian no shippai (1917)
- Chamebō shingachō – Nomi fūfu shikaeshi no maki (1917)
- Imokawa Mukuzō Chūgaeri no maki (1917)
- Imokawa Mukuzō Tsuri no maki (1917)

== Sources ==
- Jonathan Clements, Helen McCarthy (2001). The Anime Encyclopedia: A Guide to Japanese Animation Since 1917, Paperback Edition, Stone Bridge Press.
