= The Dull Sword =

1917 Japanese animated film

- Namakura Gatana

なまくら刀 (Namakura Gatana)
- Genre: Jidaigeki
- Created by: Jun'ichi Kōuchi; Senpan Maekawa
- Anime film
- Studio: Kobayashi Shokai Ltd.
- Released: June 30, 1917
- Runtime: 4 minutes

The Dull Sword (Japanese: なまくら刀, Hepburn: Namakura Gatana) is a Japanese animated short film produced by Jun'ichi Kōuchi and Senpan Maekawa in 1917. It was rediscovered by an antique shop employee in Osaka in March 2008. This film is a 4-minute silent short that tells a story about a foolish rōnin's purchase of a dull-edged sword and subsequent attempts at tsujigiri. It was released on June 30, 1917, and is among the very earliest examples of anime.

== Plot ==
Namakura Gatana (lit. 'dull-edged sword'; gatana is rendaku of katana) is a short comedic jidaigeki about a dim-witted self-appointed samurai. He gets fooled and buys a dull sword from a merchant. The samurai, trying to figure out why his new sword cannot cut anyone he strikes, tries desperately to attack random townspeople who defend themselves and knock him out.

== Rediscovery ==
It has been said that the film collector Gorō Sugimoto once possessed a 35mm film of this work, but it was destroyed in a suspicious fire in 1971. For a long time, the film was said to have disappeared, but in the summer of 2007, a film culture historian, Matsumoto Natsuki, discovered it being sold at an antique market in Osaka along with a film of Kitayama Seitaro's Urashima Taro (1918 film), and bought the toy projector along with it. See the article on the official website of the Japan Society of Image Studies, "Screening of Japan's oldest theatrically released animated films, Dull Sword and Urashima Taro, and the significance of their discovery." It was then digitally restored and screened at the "Excavated Films 2008" event held at the National Film Archive of Japan, which began on April 24, 2008. From February 2011, the film can be viewed on a video monitor in the permanent exhibition "History of Japanese Cinema" at the National Film Center, Museum of Modern Art, Tokyo. This version runs for 2 minutes, 16 fps, 35mm, silent, dyed. The Dull Sword (Hanawa Akuchi no Meitou no Maki) [Digitally Restored Version] and Urashima Taro [Digitally Restored Version] - National Museum of Modern Art, Tokyo. Later, in 2014, it was discovered that the "Nankoin Collection," donated to the National Museum of Modern Art, Tokyo in 2008, contained a film equivalent to the first half of this work, and that the version discovered in 2008 was actually a digest version that only contained the second half of this work. Oba Masanori, "Multiple Versions and the Current State of Digital Restoration,". In response to this, the National Museum of Modern Art, Tokyo Film Center digitally remastered the two films to complement each other's missing parts, and in 2014, the true "complete version" was restored as the "digitally restored longest version." The "digitally restored longest version" has a running time of 4 minutes, 16 fps, 35mm, silent, and dyed.

Furthermore, in 2017, film history researcher Honchi Akihiko discovered 35 feet and 11 frames of undiscovered film, including new footage. The footage included scenes of the masseur who had defeated the samurai making a mocking face, and the samurai hiding in the shade of a tree while trying to kill the courier. The center added new footage to the "digitally restored longest version" to create a "new longest version" of about 5 minutes, which was screened at the center's screening event "Excavated Films 2018".
