= Jun'ichi Kōuchi =

Japanese animator

Junichi Kōuchi
- Born: 15 September 1886; Okayama, Japan
- Died: 6 October 1970 (aged 84)
- Occupation: Animator
- Known for: Namakura Gatana

Jun'ichi Kōuchi (幸内純一, Kōuchi Jun'ichi) was a Japanese animator. He is referred to as one of the "fathers" of anime.

== Biography ==
Born in Okayama, Kōuchi relocated to Tokyo with his family while still a child. Watercolor painting was his first pursuit—he trained under Kokki Miyake and, beginning in January 1906, studied at the Pacific Western Painting Society's research institute—before Miyake's introduction brought him to the comic magazine Tokyo Puck in 1908, where he drew political cartoons under Rakuten Kitazawa. A five-year stint followed at the Tokyo Maiyu Shinbun starting December 1912, drawing front-page political cartoons for the paper.

Animation entered his career almost by chance: in 1917, with his cartooning work well established, Kisaburō Kobayashi of Kobayashi Shōkai commissioned him to make The Dull Sword (なまくら刀). Kōuchi completed three films for the company that year before its withdrawal from animation sent him back to newspaper work.

He did not stay away for long: in 1923 he founded the Sumikazu Eiga Sōsakusha to produce a promotional film about Shinpei Gotō, then serving as Home Minister and head of the Imperial Capital Reconstruction Department after the Great Kantō earthquake. The film's effectiveness as propaganda caught the attention of House of Representatives member Sanji Mutō, who hired Kōuchi to make party PR films between 1924 and 1929. Cut up Serpent (ちょん切れ蛇), released in 1931, marked the end of his animation career, after which he devoted himself once again to political cartooning.

== Works ==
- Hanawa Hekonai Meitō no Maki, or The Dull Sword (1917)
- Chamebō Kūkijūno Maki (1917)
- Hanawa Hekonai Kappa Matsuri (1917)
- Eiga Enzetsu Seiji no Rinrika Gotō Shinpei (1926)
- Chonkire Hebi (1930)
