= Seitarō Kitayama =

Japanese film director

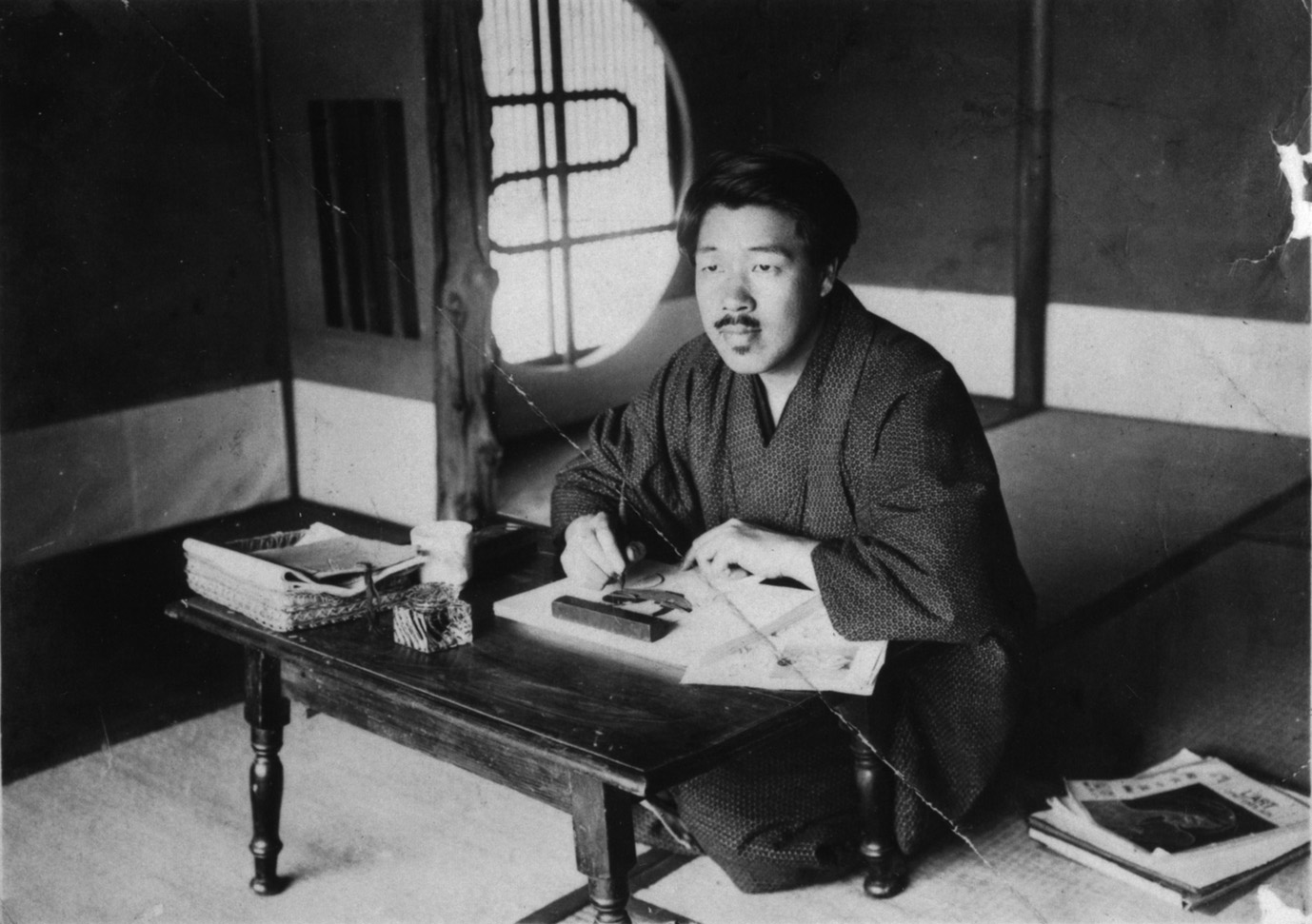
- c. 1919
- Born: March 3, 1888; Tokyo, Japan
- Died: February 13, 1945 (aged 56); Osaka, Japan
- Occupation: Animator

Seitarō Kitayama (北山 清太郎, Kitayama Seitarō; March 3, 1888 – February 13, 1945) was an early Japanese animation director whose work includes the first examples of commercial production of anime. Kitayama was referred to as one of the fathers of anime by Yoshirō Irie, a researcher at Japan's National Film Center.

== Biography ==
Kitayama's early career was in painting rather than film: apprenticed to the watercolorist Tōjirō Ōshita from 1911, he simultaneously helped edit the art magazine Mizue before relocating to Tokyo, where he founded the Western Art Guild of Japan and launched its journal Contemporary Western Art (現代の洋画). As manager of the Fusain Art Group he went on to mentor emerging Western-style painters, among them Ryūsei Kishida and Sōhachi Kimura, supplying materials and organizing their exhibitions and catalogues.

A move into film came in 1916, when Kitayama joined Nikkatsu's Mukōjima studio to work on illustrated intertitles; the studio's animation efforts began there too, producing Monkey and Crabs (猿蟹合戦), one of Japan's earliest animated films, in May 1917. Its warm reception encouraged Nikkatsu to keep making animation, and Kitayama assembled a small production team—Sanae Yamamoto and Hiroshi Mineda handling the drawing, Kiichirō Kanai the cinematography—capable of turning out upward of ten films annually.

He struck out on his own in 1921 with the independent Kitayama Film Productions, but the studio did not survive the 1923 Great Kantō earthquake. Kitayama relocated to Osaka afterward and spent the rest of his career as a newsreel cameraman for the Osaka Mainichi Shimbun, never returning to animation production.

== Works ==
- Battle of a Monkey and a Crab (1917)
- Yume no jidōsha (1917)
- Neko to nezumi (1917)
- Itazura posuto (1917)
- Hanasaka-jiji (1917)
- Chokin no susume (1917)
- (Otogibanashi–) Bunbuku chagama (1917)
- Shitakire suzume (1917)
- Kachikachiyama (1917)
- Chiri mo tsumoreba yama to naru (1917)
- Urashima Tarō (1918)
- Momotarō
- Tarou no Banpei Senkoutei no Maki
