= 1898 in animation =

Events in 1898 in animation.

== Events ==
- November: The German toy manufacturer Gebrüder Bing introduced their toy "kinematograph", at a toy convention in Leipzig. In late 1898 and early 1899, other toy manufacturers in Germany and France, including Ernst Plank, Georges Carette, and Lapierre, started selling similar devices. The toy cinematographs were basically traditional toy magic lanterns, adapted with one or two small spools that used standard "Edison perforation" 35mm film, a crank, and a shutter. These projectors were intended for the same type of "home entertainment" toy market that most of the manufacturers already provided with praxinoscopes and magic lanterns. Apart from relatively expensive live-action films, the manufacturers produced many cheaper films by printing lithographed drawings. These animations were probably made in black-and-white from around 1898 or 1899. The pictures were often traced from live-action films (much like the later rotoscoping technique). These very short films typically depicted a simple repetitive action and most were designed to be projected as a loop - playing endlessly with the film ends put together. The lithograph process and the loop format follow the tradition that was set by the stroboscopic disc, zoetrope and praxinoscope.
- Specific date unknown: The Motograph Moving Picture Book was published in London at the start of 1898 by Bliss, Sands & Co. It came with a "transparency" with black stripes to add the illusion of motion to the pictures in the book (13 in the original black and white edition and 23 in the later color edition). The illustrations were credited to "F.J. Vernay, Yorick, &c.". The book is an early form of stereography.

== Births ==
=== January ===
- January 2: Dick Huemer, American animator, comic strip artist, and illustrator (redesigned and developed Koko the Clown, created Fitz (Ko-Ko's canine companion), created Scrappy, storyboard artist for Dumbo), (d. 1979).
- January 20: Tudor Owen, Welsh actor (voice of Towser in 101 Dalmatians), (d. 1979).

=== February ===
- February 2: Billy Costello, American actor (original voice of Popeye), (d. 1971).
- February 8: André Rigal, French animation producer and animator (André Rigal's Animation Studio), (d. 1973).

=== May ===
- May 1: Hazel Sewell, American animator, head of the ink and paint department at Walt Disney Animation Studios (Plane Crazy, Snow White and the Seven Dwarfs), (d. 1975).
- May 11: Sam Slyfield, American sound engineer, (Walt Disney Animation Studios), (d. 1974).

=== June ===
- June 7: Earl Duvall, American animator, writer, lay-out artist, director and comics artist (Walt Disney Company, Warner Bros. Cartoons, Ub Iwerks, directed Honeymoon Hotel), (d. 1950).
- June 18: Dink Trout, American actor, voice artist and radio personality (voice of the title character in Bootle Beetle, Old Bootle Beetle and Balsam in Morris the Midget Moose, the King of Hearts in Alice in Wonderland), (d. 1950).
- June 28: Nat Falk, American illustrator and cartoonist (How to Make Animated Cartoons), (d. 1989).

=== July ===
- July 4: Johnny Lee, American singer, dancer and actor (voice of Br'er Rabbit in Song of the South), (d. 1965).
- July 24: Bernard B. Brown, American film composer and sound engineer (composer for Warner Bros. Cartoons, head of the sound department at Universal Studios), (d. 1981).
- July 31: Ken Harris, American animator (Warner Bros. Cartoons, Walt Disney Productions, United Productions of America, DePatie-Freleng Enterprises, Hanna-Barbera), (d. 1982).

=== August ===
- August 15: Charles Tobias, American songwriter (co-wrote the Merrie Melodies theme "Merrily We Roll Along"), (d. 1970).
- August 30: Shirley Booth, American actress (voice of Mrs. Claus in The Year Without a Santa Claus), (d. 1992).

=== October ===
- October 5: Kenzō Masaoka, Japanese animator and director (the first animator to use cel animation and recorded sound in anime, Chikara to Onna no Yo no Naka, Benkei tai Ushiwaka, Kumo to Tulip, co-founder of Toei Animation), (d. 1988).
- October 28: Rollin Hamilton, American animator (Walt Disney Company, Warner Bros. Cartoons), (d. 1951).

=== November ===
- November 4: Joe Dougherty, American actor (original voice of Porky Pig), (d. 1978).

=== December ===
- December 1: Cyril Ritchard, Australian actor (voice of The Sandman in The Daydreamer, Emperor Klockenlocher in The Enchanted World of Danny Kaye: The Emperor's New Clothes, The Frog in Tubby the Tuba, Father Thomas in The First Christmas: The Story of the First Christmas Snow, Elrond in The Hobbit), (d. 1977).
- December 14: Lillian Randolph, American actress and singer, (voice of Mammy Two Shoes in Tom and Jerry), (d. 1980).
