= 1939 in animation =

Events in 1939 in animation.

== Events ==
=== January ===
- January 13: Jack King's Donald Duck cartoon Donald's Lucky Day premieres, produced by Walt Disney Animation Studios.
- January 28: Tex Avery's Hamateur Night premieres, starring the early version of Elmer Fudd and produced by Leon Schlesinger Productions.

=== February ===
- February 18: Hamilton Luske's Mickey Mouse cartoon Mickey's Surprise Party premieres, produced by Walt Disney Animation Studios.
- February 23: 11th Academy Awards: The Walt Disney Company's Ferdinand the Bull, directed by Dick Rickard, wins the Academy Award for Best Animated Short.
- February 25: Milt Gross' Count Screwloose cartoon Jitterbug Follies premieres, produced by MGM.

=== March ===
- March 11: Tex Avery's A Day at the Zoo premieres, starring the early version of Elmer Fudd and produced by Leon Schlesinger Productions.
- March 17: The Walt Disney Company releases Goofy and Wilbur, the first solo Goofy cartoon, directed by Dick Huemer.
- March 25: Chuck Jones' Prest-O Change-O premieres, produced by Leon Schlesinger Productions, starring the Bugs Bunny prototype.

=== April ===
- April 7: The Ugly Duckling, directed by Jack Cutting and Clyde Geronimi, produced by Walt Disney Animation Studios, premieres, Its the final short in the Silly Symphonies series.
- April 22: Chuck Jones' Daffy Duck and the Dinosaur premieres, produced by Leon Schlesinger Productions, this was Jones' first short starring Daffy Duck.
- April 28: Jack King's Donald Duck cartoon The Hockey Champ premieres, produced by Walt Disney Animation Studios. Also starring Huey, Dewey, and Louie.

=== May ===
- May 6: Tex Avery's Thugs with Dirty Mugs premieres, produced by Leon Schlesinger Productions.
- May 19: Jack King's Donald Duck cartoon Donald's Cousin Gus premieres, produced by Walt Disney Animation Studios.
- May 20: Chuck Jones' Naughty but Mice premieres, produced by Leon Schlesinger Productions, which marks the debut of Sniffles the Mouse.

=== June ===
- June 3: Tex Avery's Believe It or Else premieres, produced by Leon Schlesinger Productions. This was the last cartoon to feature the early version of Elmer Fudd as he would get redesigned into his iconic design the following year.
- June 9: Clyde Geronimi's first Donald Duck cartoon Beach Picnic premieres, produced by Walt Disney Animation Studios. Also starring Pluto.
- June 10: Harman & Ising's The Bear That Couldn't Sleep is first released, produced by MGM which marks the debut of Barney Bear.
- June 30: Dick Lundy's first Donald Duck cartoon Sea Scouts premieres, produced by Walt Disney Animation Studios. Also starring Huey, Dewey, and Louie.

=== July ===
- July 1: Chuck Jones' Porky Pig cartoon Old Glory premieres, produced by Leon Schlesinger Productions which stands out for being a serious and educational propaganda cartoon about the Pledge of Allegiance.
- July 7: The final Betty Boop cartoon Rhythm on the Reservation, produced by the Fleischer Brothers, premieres.
- July 15: Tex Avery's Dangerous Dan McFoo premieres, produced by Leon Schlesinger Productions. This was the first Looney Tunes/Merrie Melodies short to star the actor Arthur Q. Bryan, who would eventually become the official voice of Elmer Fudd.
- July 21: Clyde Geronimi's Mickey Mouse cartoon The Pointer premieres, produced by the Walt Disney Animation Studios. In the cartoon Mickey and Pluto go hunting and encounter a bear.

=== August ===
- August 5: Ben Hardaway and Cal Dalton's Hare-um Scare-um premieres, produced by Leon Schlesinger Productions, starring the Bugs Bunny prototype. The prototype rabbit is seen with grey fur for the first time, which would end up being the final design for Bugs.
- August 11: Jack King's Donald Duck cartoon Donald's Penguin premieres, produced by Walt Disney Animation Studios.
- August 12: Tex Avery's Detouring America premieres, produced by Leon Schlesinger Productions.

=== September ===
- September 1:
  - Jack King's Donald Duck cartoon The Autograph Hound premieres, produced by Walt Disney Animation Studios.
  - BBC Television Service broadcasts the Mickey Mouse cartoon Mickey's Gala Premier, produced by the Walt Disney Animation Studios. Afterwards it ceases all broadcasting because of the outbreak of World War II. An urban legend about this final broadcast claims that due to the sudden outbreak of the war the BBC cut the cartoon short and when BBC-TV resumed after the conflict, it was picked up at the very point it had been interrupted. Despite this widespread belief, the cartoon was shown in its entirety and then followed by tuning signals. On 7 June 1946, the day BBC television broadcasts resumed after the war, Mickey's Gala Premier was shown again.
- September 14: Tex Avery's Land of the Midnight Fun premieres, produced by Leon Schlesinger Productions.
- September 22: Clyde Geronimi's first Donald Duck cartoon Officer Duck premieres, produced by Walt Disney Animation Studios. Also starring Pete (named Tiny Tom in this short).

=== October ===
- October 7: Chuck Jones' The Little Lion Hunter premieres in which Inki and the Mynah Bird make their debuts.
- October 9: Walter Lantz's Life Begins for Andy Panda premieres, which marks the debut of Andy Panda.
- October 28: Tex Avery's Fresh Fish premieres, produced by Leon Schlesinger Productions.

=== December ===
- December 2: Tex Avery's Screwball Football premieres, produced by Leon Schlesinger Productions.
- December 9: Hugh Harman's Peace on Earth premieres, produced by MGM which will become a classic.
- December 22: The Fleischer Studios release Gulliver's Travels, the second American feature-length animated film.

=== Specific date unknown ===
- In Antwerp Ray Goossens, Henri Winkeler, Jules Luyckx and Edmond Roex establish their own animation studio, AFIM (Antwerpse Filmmaatschappij). It will exist until 1944.
- Kenzō Masaoka's Benkei tai Ushiwaka premieres.

== Films released ==
- July 1 - The Golden Key (Soviet Union)
- December 22 - Gulliver's Travels (United States)

== Births ==
=== January ===
- January 1: Masako Ikeda, Japanese voice actress (voice of Maetel in Galaxy Express 999, Chimera Ant Queen in Hunter × Hunter, Sharon in Space Brothers, Nanaka no Oba in Myself; Yourself, Fuyuka Liqueur in Silent Möbius, Nodoka Saotome in Ranma ½, Japanese voice of Charlotte in Charlotte's Web, Hera in Hercules), (d. 2026).
- January 10: Harrie Geelen, Dutch illustrator, film director and animator (Toonder Studios), (d. 2025).
- January 23:
  - Greg Hildebrandt, American poster artist (Animal Crackers) and character designer (Little Orphan Annie's A Very Animated Christmas), (d. 2024).
  - Tim Hildebrandt, American poster artist (The Secret of NIMH), and character designer (Little Orphan Annie's A Very Animated Christmas), (d. 2006).
- January 25: Angela Thorne, British actress (voice of the Queen of England in The BFG), (d. 2023).

=== February ===
- February 2: Jackie Burroughs, English-born Canadian actress (voice of the Spirit in The Care Bears Movie, Katherine in Heavy Metal, Morag in Star Wars: Ewoks, Frau Rottenmeier in Heidi), (d. 2010).
- February 6: Mike Farrell, American actor (voice of Jonathan Kent in the DC Animated Universe and Superman: Brainiac Attacks).
- February 7: Vladimir Tarasov, Russian animator and animation director (Soyuzmultfilm).
- February 12: Michele Kalamera, Italian actor (Italian dub voice of Razoul in Aladdin, The King in Cars, Commander Bristle in Tom and Jerry: Blast Off to Mars, Rourke in Atlantis: The Lost Empire, Baloo in TaleSpin), (d. 2023).
- February 13: Vittoria Febbi, Italian actress (voice of the Blue Fairy in The Adventures of Pinocchio, italian dub voice of Alice in Alice in Wonderland, Aunt Fanny in Robots, Flo in All Dogs Go to Heaven, Mayor McGerkle in The Grinch, Nora Beady in Barnyard, Narrator in The Pebble and the Penguin).
- February 15: Taichirō Hirokawa, Japanese voice actor, (d. 2008).
- February 27: David Mitton, English television and film director and producer, model maker and special effects technician (Thomas & Friends), (d. 2008).

=== March ===
- March 1: David Weatherley, British-born New Zealand actor (voice of Tuckered in Mosley), (d. 2024).
- March 5:
  - Camillo Teti, Italian production manager, film producer and director (Titanic: The Legend Goes On, Yo-Rhad, un amico dallo spazio).
  - Samantha Eggar, English-American actress (voice of Hera in the Hercules franchise, Whale in Metalocalypse, Guinevere in The Legend of Prince Valiant, Ms. O'Mally in P.J. Sparkles, Queen Isabella in The Magic Voyage), (d. 2025).

=== April ===
- April 10: Shinji Mizushima, Japanese manga artist (Dokaben), (d. 2022).
- April 13: Paul Sorvino, American actor (voice of Alphonse Perrier du von Scheck in Hey Arnold!: The Movie, Variecom CEO in the Duckman episode "How to Suck in Business Without Really Trying"), (d. 2022).
- April 23:
  - Lee Majors, American actor (voice of General Abernathy in G.I. Joe: Renegades, Jeff Tracy in Thunderbirds Are Go, Steve from Ausin in the Wapos Bay episode "Guardians", Babar and David Faustino's Agent in the Robot Chicken episode "Love, Maurice", himself in the Family Guy episode "Running Mates").
  - Patrick Williams, American composer, arranger and conductor (The Simpsons), (d. 2018).
- April 28: Michiyo Yasuda, Japanese animator (Toei Animation, A Production, Nippon Animation, Topcraft, Studio Ghibli), (d. 2016).

=== May ===
- May 10: Noreen Young, Canadian actress (voice of Baby Hugs in The Care Bears Battle the Freeze Machine, additional voices in Tukiki and His Search for a Merry Christmas), (d. 2025).
- May 22: Paul Winfield, American actor (voice of Mr. Smith in The Wish That Changed Christmas, Jeffrey Robbins in Gargoyles, Mr. Ruhle in The Magic School Bus, Omar Mosley/Black Marvel in Spider-Man, Sam Young in Batman Beyond, Lucious Sweet in The Simpsons, Earl Cooper in the Batman: The Animated Series episode "The Mechanic", Father in the Happily Ever After: Fairy Tales for Every Child episode "Beauty and the Beast"), (d. 2004).
- May 25: Ian McKellen, English actor (voice of Horatio Huntington in Animal Crackers, Toad in Flushed Away, Cecil Pritchfield in the Family Guy episode "Send In Stewie, Please", himself in The Simpsons episode "The Regina Monologues").
- May 28: Beth Howland, American actress (voice of Singer in the Batman Beyond episode "Out of the Past", Dr. Leventhal in the As Told by Ginger episode "And She Was Gone"), (d. 2015).
- May 30: Baoan Coleman, Vietnamese-American actor (voice of Mr. Hyunh in Hey Arnold!), (d. 2025).

=== June ===
- June 13: Siegfried Fischbacher, German-American magician, entertainer and producer (Father of the Pride), (d. 2021).
- June 26: Stu Rosen, American voice director and actor (Hulk Hogan's Rock 'n' Wrestling, The Legend of Prince Valiant, Fraggle Rock: The Animated Series), (d. 2019).
- June 29: Brian Johnson, British special effects artist (Thunderbirds), (d. 2026).

=== July ===
- July 12: Tamao Nakamura, Japanese actress (voice of Shige's Friend in My Neighbors the Yamadas), (d. 2026).
- July 19: Stanisław Lenartowicz, Polish animator, (d. 2023).
- July 26: Bob Baker, English screenwriter (Wallace & Gromit), (d. 2021).
- July 28: Renato Cortesi, Italian voice actor (Italian dub voice of Goofy in Who Framed Roger Rabbit, Tigger in the Winnie the Pooh franchise, Principal Skinner in The Simpsons, Lafayette in The Aristocats), (d. 2026).
- July 30:
  - Peter Bogdanovich, American director, writer, actor, producer, critic and film historian (voice of Psychologist in The Simpsons episode "Yokel Chords"), (d. 2022).
  - Alois Švehlík, Czech actor (voice of Old Wachek in Alois Nebel, Czech dub voice of Amos Slade in The Fox and the Hound, Vahúr in The Little Fox, Samson's father in Samson & Sally, Chuckles in Toy Story 3), (d. 2025).

=== August ===
- August 16: Carole Shelley, English actress (voice of Amelia Gabble in The Aristocats, Lady Kluck in Robin Hood), (d. 2018).
- August 22: Valerie Harper, American actress (voice of various characters in The Simpsons, Townspeople in the Sorcerous Stabber Orphen episode "The Sword of Baltanders", Maryellen and Librarian in the As Told by Ginger episode "The Wedding Frame", IHOP Diner in the American Dad! episode "Cock of the Sleepwalk", additional voices in Generator Gawl), (d. 2019).
- August 30: John Peel, English disc jockey, radio presenter, record producer and journalist (voice of Announcer in the Space Ghost Coast to Coast episode "Explode"), (d. 2004).

=== September ===
- September 1: Lily Tomlin, American actress (voice of Ms. Frizzle in The Magic School Bus, Edith Ann in Edith Ann: A Few Pieces of the Puzzle, Edith Ann: Homeless Go Home and Edith Ann's Christmas (Just Say Noel), Mommo in The Ant Bully, Toki in Ponyo, May Parker in Spider-Man: Into the Spider-Verse, Tammy in The Simpsons episode "The Last of the Red Hat Mamas").
- September 5:
  - Stephen J. Lawrence, American composer (Sesame Street, The Wubbulous World of Dr. Seuss), (d. 2021).
  - George Lazenby, Australian actor (voice of King in Batman Beyond).
- September 6: David Allan Coe, American singer (voiced himself in the Squidbillies episode "The Okaleechee Dam Jam"), (d. 2026).
- September 13: Richard Kiel, American actor (voice of Vladimir in Tangled), (d. 2014).
- September 17: Shelby Flint, American singer-songwriter (Snoopy Come Home, The Rescuers), and actress (voice of Belle in The Stingiest Man in Town, Lilly Lorraine in Rudolph and Frosty's Christmas in July).
- September 27: Carol Lynn Pearson, American author and screenwriter (Thumbelina), (d. 2026).
- September 28: Rudolph Walker, Trinidadian-British actor (voice of Voice Trumpet in Teletubbies).

=== October ===
- October 2: Yoshisada Sakaguchi, Japanese voice actor (voice of Philip II of Macedon in Reign, Muijika in Mushishi, Hachiroh Tohbe in Jin-Roh: The Wolf Brigade, Tonpetty in JoJo's Bizarre Adventure: Phantom Blood), (d. 2020).
- October 24: F. Murray Abraham, American actor (voice of Grimmel in How to Train Your Dragon: The Hidden World, Jupiter in Isle of Dogs).
- October 27: John Cleese, English actor, comedian, (voice of Cat R. Waul in An American Tail: Fievel Goes West, Albert in The Magic Pudding, King Harold in the Shrek franchise, Quincy Endicott/Adelaide in Over the Garden Wall, narrator in Winnie the Pooh and House of Mouse, King Gristle Sr. in Trolls, Bulldog in Planes), and screenwriter (The Croods).
- October 30: Danny Goldman, American actor and casting director (voice of Brainy Smurf in The Smurfs, Cartoon All-Stars to the Rescue and Robot Chicken), (d. 2020).

=== November ===
- November 10: Russell Means, American activist and actor (voice of Chief Powhatan in Pocahontas and Pocahontas II: Journey to a New World, Shaman and Chief Sentry in Turok: Son of Stone, Thomas in the Duckman episode "Role With It"), (d. 2012).
- November 18: Brenda Vaccaro, American actress (voice of Tilly in Nestor the Long-Eared Christmas Donkey, Scruple and Architect Smurf in The Smurfs, Didi in The Jetsons Meet the Flintstones, Ardeth in The Critic, Marge and Chi in Captain Planet and the Planeteers, Bunny Bravo and other various characters in Johnny Bravo, Mrs. Hirsch in Charlotte's Web 2: Wilbur's Great Adventure, Kameyo in Kubo and the Two Strings, Slim in the Darkwing Duck episode "You Sweat Your Life", Gilda in the Goof Troop episode "Date with Destiny", Strip Club Manager in the American Dad! episode "Stan Knows Best", Godmonster in the Summer Camp Island episode "Monster Visit").
- November 26: Tina Turner, Swiss-American singer and actress (performed the song "Great Spirits" in Brother Bear), (d. 2023).
- November 30: Andrei Khrzhanovsky, Russian animator (There Lived Kozyavin, The Glass Harmonica, The Nose or the Conspiracy of Mavericks).

=== December ===
- December 4:
  - Juli Erickson, American actress (voice of Pinako Rockbell in Fullmetal Alchemist, Setsu in Samurai 7, Ogen Iga in Basilisk, Stargazer in Darker than Black, Ohba in Fairy Tail), (d. 2025).
  - Robert Glass, American sound engineer (The Simpsons), (d. 1993).
- December 23: Nathalie Dupree, American cookbook writer and television personality (played herself in the Space Ghost Coast to Coast episode "Cookout"), (d. 2025).
- December 26: Ron Campbell, Australian film director, producer (Ron Campbell Films, Inc.) and animator (Hanna-Barbera, Disney Television Animation, Nickelodeon Animation Studio, The Beatles, Yellow Submarine, Sesame Street, Duckman), (d. 2021).
- December 31: Jorge Calandrelli, Argentine composer (The Great Mouse Detective), (d. 2026).

=== Specific date unknown ===
- Suzanne Baker, Australian film producer (Leisure).
- Nelson Shin, Korean animator (DePatie-Freleng Enterprises, Marvel Productions, Star Wars), director (The Transformers: The Movie, Toad Patrol) and producer (The Transformers, Spiral Zone, founder and president of AKOM).
- David Brown, American businessman (co-founder of Blue Sky Studios), (d. 2003).
- Sam Cornell, American animator (George of the Jungle, The Hugga Bunch, Jetsons: The Movie, directed the main titles for The Wuzzles and The New Woody Woodpecker Show), background artist (Shinbone Alley), storyboard artist (George of the Jungle, The Rugrats Movie), writer and director (The New 3 Stooges), (d. 2021).
- David Hamilton Grant, English pornographic producer and convicted criminal (Snow White and the Seven Perverts), (d. 1991).

== Deaths ==
=== January ===
- January 20: Victor Bergdahl, Swedish animator and comics artist (Kapten Grogg), dies at age 60.

=== July ===
- July 4: Louis Wain, English artist (Wain made a short-lived venture into film animation, drawing the first ever screen cartoon cat, "Pussyfoot". His cartoons were not a cinema success), dies at age 78.

=== October ===
- October 10: Benjamin Rabier, French comics artist, illustrator, animator and advertising artist (Gédéon, Tintin-Lutin, designed La Vache Qui Rit), dies at age 74.

=== November ===
- November 22: Walter Hoban, American cartoonist (created the comic strip Jerry on the Job, which received several animated adaptations by the animation studio Bray Productions), dies at age 38.
- November 30: Max Skladanowsky, German businessman, filmmaker, and inventor, (he performed dissolving magic lantern shows, for which he developed special multi-lens devices that allowed simultaneous projection of up to nine separate image sequences. He invented the Bioscop movie projector. He produced flip books and 3-D anaglyph image slides, dies at age 76.

=== December ===
- December 30: Charles Mintz, American film producer and distributor (Winkler Pictures, Oswald the Lucky Rabbit), dies at age 50.

== See also ==
- List of anime by release date (1939–1945)
