= 1911 in animation =

Events in 1911 in animation.

== Films released ==
- Unknown date – By the Light of the Moon (United States)
- 8 April – Little Nemo (United States)

== Births ==
=== January ===
- January 18: Danny Kaye, American actor, comedian and singer (voice of Seymour S. Sassafras, Colonel B. Wellington, B. Bunny and Antoine in Here Comes Peter Cottontail, Marmaduke in The Enchanted World of Danny Kaye), (d. 1987).
- January 26: Jean Image, Hungarian-French animator and film director (Johnny the Giant Killer, Kiri le Clown, Joe), (d. 1989).

=== February ===
- February 10: Norman McCabe, English-American animator and illustrator (Warner Brothers Animation, DePatie-Freleng, Filmation), (d. 2006).
- February 11: Harvey Eisenberg, American animator and comics artist (MGM Animation, Hanna-Barbera), (d. 1965).
- February 12: Frank Grundeen, American animator and comics artist (Walt Disney Company), (d. 1986).

=== March ===
- March 1: Don DaGradi, American writer (Walt Disney Animation Studios), (d. 1991).
- March 9: John Lounsbery, American animator (Walt Disney Company), (d. 1976).
- March 12: Joshua Meador, American animator, film director and special effects artist (Walt Disney Studios, animation effects in Forbidden Planet), (d. 1965).
- March 17: Orestes Calpini, American animator (Fleischer Studios, Famous Studios), (d. 1974).
- March 18: William Lava, American composer (Looney Tunes, The Pink Panther), (d. 1971).
- March 24:
  - Cal Howard, American animator, cartoon writer (Walter Lantz, Walt Disney Company, Fleischer Brothers, Ub Iwerks, Warner Bros. Cartoons, Screen Gems) and voice actor (voice of Gabby Goat in Get Rich Quick Porky, Prince David in Gulliver's Travels), (d. 1993).
  - Joseph Barbera, American animator, film director and producer (Tom & Jerry, The Flintstones, Yogi Bear, The Jetsons, Wacky Races, Scooby-Doo), co-founder of Hanna-Barbera, (d. 2006).
- March 26: T. Hee, American animator and film director (Warner Bros. Cartoons, Walt Disney Company, UPA, Terrytoons), (d. 1988).

=== April ===
- April 1: Harry Love, American animator and production coordinator (Charles Mintz, Warner Bros. Cartoons, DePatie-Freleng, The Nine Lives of Fritz the Cat), (d. 1997).
- April 11: Harry Holt, American comics artist and animator (Walt Disney Animation Studios, Hanna-Barbera), (d. 2004).

=== May ===
- May 1: Maurice Noble, American film director, writer (Tiny Toon Adventures), production designer and background artist (Walt Disney Animation Studios, Warner Bros. Cartoons, MGM Animation/Visual Arts, DePatie-Freleng Enterprises, Poochini, Timber Wolf), (d. 2001).
- May 6: Frank Nelson, American actor (voice of Mr. Cow in Tootsie Pop commercial, Uncle Dudley in Dinky Dog, Tall Doctor in Puff the Magic Dragon, Wizzar in Monchhichis, Governor Wetworth in Snorks, Dr. Pavlov in Foofur, Satan in The Looney Looney Looney Bugs Bunny Movie), (d. 1986).
- May 11: Doodles Weaver, American actor, comedian, musician and comics writer (narrator in the Goofy cartoon Hockey Homicide), (d. 1983).
- May 18: Larry Lansburgh, American producer, director, and screenwriter (Walt Disney Company), (d. 2001).
- May 27: Vincent Price, American actor (voice of January Q. Irontail in Here Comes Peter Cottontail, narrator in Vincent, Vincent Van Ghoul in The 13 Ghosts of Scooby-Doo, Professor Ratigan in The Great Mouse Detective, Edgar Allan Poe in Tiny Toon Adventures, Zigzag in The Thief and the Cobbler), (d. 1993).
- May 29: Vivi Janiss, American actress (voice of Daisy Duck in Donald's Diary), (d. 1988).

=== June ===
- June 9: Hawley Pratt, American film director, lay-out artist illustrator and animator (Walt Disney Company, Warner Bros. Cartoons, Hanna-Barbera, Filmation, DePatie-Freleng Enterprises), (d. 1999).
- June 19: Eric Porter, Australian animator and film director (Marco Polo Junior Versus the Red Dragon), (d. 1983).

=== July ===
- July 6: LaVerne Andrews, American singer (co-sang the "Johnny Fedora and Alice Blue Bonnet" segment in Make Mine Music, and "Little Toot" in Melody Time), (d. 1967).
- July 10: Terry-Thomas, English actor and comedian (voice of Sir Hiss in Robin Hood), (d. 1990).
- July 18: Bernard Wolf, American film producer (Paramount Studios, Fleischer Studios, Ub Iwerks, Walt Disney Animation Studios, MGM, Rudolph Ising, Sesame Street, Hanna-Barbera), (d. 2006).

=== August ===
- August 1: Alex Cubie, Scottish comics artist and animator (Rank Film Distributors), (d. 1995).
- August 5: Bob Wickersham, American animator and comics artist (Walt Disney Animation Studios, Ub Iwerks, Fleischer Studios, Terrytoons, Warner Bros. Cartoons), (d. 1962).
- August 8: Rosetta LeNoire, American voice actress (voice of Big Bertha in Fritz the Cat), (d. 2002).
- August 12:
  - Felix Felton, English actor (voice of the Ghost of Christmas Present in A Christmas Carol), (d. 1972).
  - Cantinflas, Mexican comedian, actor and filmmaker (voice of Amigo in Amigo and Friends), (d. 1993).
- August 13: Viktor Kálmán, Hungarian painter, animator and comics artist (Az Okos Kapus), (d. 1985).
- August 31: Frank Smith, American animator and film director (Fleischer Studios, Walter Lantz Productions, UPA, Peanuts specials), (d. 1975).

=== September ===
- September 7: Fred Moore, American animator (Walt Disney Company), (d. 1952).
- September 11: Ramey Idriss, American songwriter, author, composer and musician (co-wrote The Woody Woodpecker Song), (d. 1971).
- September 24: Mitsuyo Seo, Japanese animator and film director (Momotarō no Umiwashi, Momotarō: Umi no Shinpei), (d. 2010).

=== October ===
- October 1:
  - Lee Blair, American artist (Walt Disney Animation Studios), (d. 1993).
  - Irwin Kostal, American musical arranger (Walt Disney Animation Studios, Charlotte's Web), (d. 1994).
- October 3: Michael Hordern, English actor (voice of Jacob Marley in A Christmas Carol, Frith in Watership Down, Badger in The Wind in the Willows film and tv series, the narrator in Paddington), (d. 1995).
- October 11: Hy Hirsh, American photographer and film director, (d. 1961).
- October 21: Mary Blair, American artist, animator and designer (The Walt Disney Company), (d. 1978).
- October 23: Frederik Bramming, Danish animator and comics artist (made advertising animated shorts for Bergenholz), (d. 1991).

=== November ===
- November 5: Roy Rogers, American singer and actor (narrator in the Pecos Bill segment in Melody Time), (d. 1998).
- November 6: Stephen Bosustow, Canadian-American animator (Ub Iwerks, Walter Lantz Productions, Walt Disney Animation Studios) and film producer (UPA, Gerald McBoing Boing, Mr. Magoo, Bosustow Entertainment, Sesame Street), (d. 1981).
- November 10: Harry Andrews, English actor (voice of General Woundwort in Watership Down), (d. 1989).
- November 15: Joaquin Garay, Mexican actor (voice of Panchito Pistoles in The Three Caballeros), (d. 1990).
- November 21: Andy Engman, Swedish-Finnish-American animator (Walt Disney Company), (d. 2004).
- November 23: Ray Patterson, American animator and film director and producer (worked for Screen Gems, Walt Disney Animation Studios, MGM Animation, Grantray-Lawrence Animation, Hanna-Barbera), (d. 2001).
- November 25: Paul Murry, American animator, comics artist and writer (Walt Disney Company), (d. 1989).

=== December ===
- December 8: Kin Platt, American caricaturist, radio writer, TV writer, comics artist and animation writer (Walt Disney Animation, Hanna-Barbera, Terrytoons, Milton the Monster), (d. 2003).
- December 18: David Hilberman, American animator, film director and producer (Walt Disney Company, co-founder of UPA, Hanna-Barbera), (d. 2007).
- December 30: Jeanette Nolan, American actress (voice of Ellie Mae in The Rescuers, Widow Tweed in The Fox and the Hound), (d. 1998).

=== Specific date unknown ===
- Dan Noonan, American animator and comics artist (Terrytoons, Walt Disney Company, Filmation, Hanna-Barbera), (d. 1982).
