= List of anime by release date (1939–1945) =

This is a list of anime by release date which covers Japanese animated productions that were made between 1939–1945. Some films included in this list may not be compliant with all definitions of anime.

English name	Japanese name	Romaji	Format	Original Release Date
Benkei and Ushiwaka	弁慶対牛若	Benkei tai Ushiwaka	Short Film	1939
Cat's Folktale	ニャンの浦島	Nyan no urashima	Short Film	1939
Monkey and Crabs	新猿蟹合戰	Shin Sarukanigassen	Short Film	1939
Swim, Monkey, Swim!	泳げや泳げ	Oyoge ya Oyoge	Short Film	1939
The Sea Eagle	海の荒鷲	Umi no arawashi	Short Film	1939
Kintaro's Training Day	キンタロー体育日記	Kintarou Taiiku Nikki	Short Film	1940
Magician In The Dream	夢の魔術師	Yume no Majutsushi	Short Film	1940
The Quack Infantry Troop	あひる陸戰隊	Ahiru rikusentai	Short Film	1940
The Pretend Butterfly Lady	お蝶夫人の幻想	Ochofujinno genso	Short Film	1940
Arichan the Ant	アリチャン	Arichan	Short Film	1941
Attack on Fuku-chan	フクちゃんの奇襲	Fuku-chan no kishū	Short Film	1941
Baby Kangaroo's Birthday Surprise	カンガルーの誕生日	Kangaroo no Tanjoubi	Short Film	1941
Children and Handicraft	子供と工作	Kodomo to kōsaku	Short Film	1941
Jack and the Beanstalk	ジャックと豆の木	Jakku to mame no ki	Short Film	1941
Our Marines	お猿三吉 ぼくらの海兵団	Bokura no Kaiheidan	Short Film	1941
The Lazy Fox	なまけぎつね	Namakegitsune	Short Film	1941
Defeat of the Spies	スパイ撃滅	Supai Gekimetsu	Short Film	1942
Mabo Fights Hard in the South Seas	マー坊の南海奮戦記	Mabo no nankai funsen-ki	Short Film	1942
Momotaro's Sea Eagles	桃太郎の海鷲	Momotarou no Umiwashi	Film	1942
Mountain Mobilization	お山の総動員	Oyama no Soudouin	Short Film	1942
Princess Kaguya	かぐや姫	Kaguya Hime	Short Film	1942
Sankichi the Monkey: The Air Combat	お猿の三吉～防空戦	Osaru no Sankichi: Boukuusen	Short Film	1942
Long Live Japan	日本 万歳	Nippon Banzai	Short Film	1943
Spider and Tulip	くもとちゅうりっぷ	Kumo to Tulip	Short Film	1943
The Battle of the Malay Sea	マレー沖海戦	Maree oki kaisen	Short Film	1943
Fuku-chan's Submarine	フクちゃんの潛水艦	Fuku-chan no Sensuikan	Short Film	1944
Insect Heaven	昆虫天国	Konchu Tengoku	Short Film	1945
Momotaro's Divine Sea Warriors	桃太郎 海の神兵	Momotarō: Umi no Shinpei	Feature Film	1945

== Notable births ==
- June 26, 1940– Tetsu Dezaki, director, producer, screenwriter.
- January 5, 1941– Hayao Miyazaki, director, producer, screenwriter, animator, author, manga artist.
- November 18, 1943– Osamu Dezaki (1943–2011), film director, screenwriter.
- April 21, 1944– Toyoo Ashida (1944–2011), director, character designer, animator, animation director, screenwriter.

== Notable deaths ==
- February 2, 1945– Seitarō Kitayama (b. 1888)

== See also ==
- List of anime by release date (pre-1939)
- List of anime by release date (1946–1959)
- History of anime
- List of years in animation
