= Voice acting in Japan =

Industry and occupation

Voice acting in Japan is an industry where actors provide voice-overs as characters or narrators in media including anime, video games, audio dramas, commercials, and dubbing for non-Japanese films and television programs.

In Japan, voice actors (声優, seiyū) and actresses have devoted fan clubs due to a crossover with the idol industry, and some fans may watch a show or play a game merely to hear a particular voice actor. Many voice actors have concurrent singing careers and have also crossed over to live-action media.

There are around 130 voice acting schools in Japan. Broadcast companies and talent agencies often have their own troupes of vocal actors. Magazines focusing specifically on voice acting are published in Japan, with Voice Animage being the longest-running.

The term character voice (abbreviated CV) has been commonly used since the 1980s by such Japanese anime magazines as Animec and Newtype to describe a voice actor associated with a particular anime or game character.

== Definition and role ==
A voice actor (声優, seiyū) provides voice-overs for characters and narration for various types of media, including anime, video games, audio dramas, live-action stunt and puppet shows, and commercials. A voice actor also provides dubbing for non-Japanese television programs and films. The initial term for voice actors in Japan was "koe no haiyū" (声の俳優), but was later shortened to a compound word to make the word "seiyū" (声優). While several voice actors opposed the term, believing it devalued their roles as actors, only after voice acting became more prominent did the word become more widespread.

There are three main factors that set voice actors and traditional actors apart:

- Their professional upbringing by the Tokyo Broadcasting Drama Troupe (東京放送劇団, Tōkyō Hōsō Gekidan), formed by NHK and other private networks during the golden age of radio.
- The lack of Japan-made movies and dramas forced TV networks to air foreign shows, which raised demand for voice actors.
- The boom in the anime world market, which produced a wave of young talents who wanted to become voice actors, rather than traditional actors.

== History ==
Voice acting has existed in Japan since the advent of radio. It was only in the 1970s that the term seiyū entered popular usage because of the anime Space Battleship Yamato. According to a newspaper interview with a voice talent manager, "Since the Yamato boom, the word 'seiyū' has become instantly recognised; before that, actors and actresses who introduced themselves as seiyū were often asked, 'You mean you work for Seiyu supermarket?'"

=== Early history ===
The earliest Japanese animation would predate the introduction of audio in film by at least a decade. Much like their live-action contemporaries during this period, screenings would have musical accompaniment and oftentimes include a benshi (narrator). The benshi would fulfill a role similar to ones in the Japanese puppet theater and magic lantern shows, where the narration would fill in dialogue and other story elements. With the introduction of sound in film, voices were often pulled from the available staff. For example, in Benkei tai Ushiwaka, animator Kenzō Masaoka cast himself and his wife as the titular Benkei and Ushiwaka, respectively.

=== Radio drama era ===
In 1925, the Tokyo Broadcasting Company (predecessor to the NHK, Japan's public broadcasting system) started radio broadcasts. In that same year, twelve students who were specialising in voice-only performances became the first voice actors in Japan when a performance of a radio drama was broadcast. They referred to themselves as "seiyū", but in those days the term "radio actor" (ラジオ役者, radio yakusha) was used by newspapers to refer to the profession.

In 1941, NHK opened a training program to the public to prepare actors to specialise in radio dramas. This was called the "Tokyo Central Broadcasting Station Actor Training Agency" (東京中央放送局専属劇団俳優養成所, Tōkyō Chūō Hōsō Kyoku Senzoku Gekidan Haiyū Yōsei Sho). Then in 1942, the Tokyo Broadcasting Drama Troupe debuted its first performance. This was the second time that the term "seiyū" was used to refer to voice actors.

There are several theories as to how the term "seiyū" was coined. One theory is that Oyhashi Tokusaburo, a reporter for the Yomiuri Newspaper, coined the term. Another theory is that Tatsu Ooka, an entertainment programming managing producer for the NHK, came up with it.

At first, voice actors, like those at the Tokyo Radio Drama Troupe and similar companies, specialised in radio dramas; with the advent of television, the term took on the additional meaning of one who does dubbing for animation. Television broadcasting aside, when radio was the leading mass medium, actors who played in radio dramas were not without their fans; for example, actors in the Nagoya Radio Drama troupe who played the lead love interest roles often received many fan letters.

=== 1950s: First voice actor boom ===
Starting in the 1950s, a rise in the popularity of radio dramas as well as foreign television and film created many new opportunities for voice actors. After the 1950 Broadcasting Act, the Nippon Hōsō Kyōkai (NHK) began public broadcasting. Among these new broadcasts were several radio dramas, such as the 1952 drama Kimi no Nawa (Your Name), which would receive several adaptations on film, television, and stage due to its popularity.

Actors that were famous for their roles in dubbing and radio were used for their star power to voice similar characters in several anime productions. For example, Yasuo Yamada, who was famous for his Japanese dub of Clint Eastwood, was chosen to voice Lupin III for the Lupin the Third series.

=== 1960s ===
In 1961, during the early days of commercial television broadcasting, the Five-Company Agreement (Gosha Agreement) caused the supply of Japanese movies that were available to Japanese television stations to dry up. As a result, in the 1960s many foreign dramas and other foreign programming was imported and dubbed into Japanese language for television broadcast.

At first, the NHK subtitled most foreign shows; however, shows dubbed in the Japanese language soon became the standard. At the centre of the first voice acting boom were actors like Nachi Nozawa, who dubbed the same foreign actors, in Nozawa's case Alain Delon, Robert Redford, and Giuliano Gemma. Because of problems with pay guarantees arising from the Gosha Agreement, cinema actors were prevented from dubbing foreign movies for television. Television actors were also prevented from dubbing because of a similar agreement. This caused studios to turn to actors from the radio age and actors from the Shingeki style of acting. Around this time dubbing of foreign animation was done by Rakugo story tellers, Asakusa comedians and the like, and voice actors were called "dubbing talents" if they specialised in dubbing, while those giving voice to a character went under the name of "ateshi". It is during this golden age for dubbing that the Tokyo Actor's Consumer's Cooperative Society was founded. Later, Haikyo voice acting managers left and opened their own management agencies. Voice actors in Japan also voiced anime.

The first dubbed show broadcast in Japan was an episode of the American cartoon Superman, on October 9, 1955, on KRT (today TBS), and the first non-animated dubbed show broadcast was Cowboy G-Men, again by KRT, in 1956. Both were dubbed live; the first show to be broadcast with pre-recorded dubbing was The Adventures of Television Boy (テレビ坊やの冒険, Terebi Bōya no Bōken) on April 8, 1956.

=== 1970s: Second voice actor boom ===
During the late 1970s, Akio Nojima, Kazuyuki Sogabe, Akira Kamiya, Tōru Furuya and Toshio Furukawa were the first to unite into a band, Slapstick, and perform live. Many other voice actors released their own albums. At around 1979 the first anime magazines began to be published. The then-editor-in-chief of Animage, Hideo Ogata, was the first to publish editorials on the ongoing transformation of voice actors into idols. Following his lead, the other magazines created "seiyū corners" with information and gossip about voice actors; this was one of the main causes of young anime fans yearning to become voice actors. This period also saw a gradual split of anime voice actors from their roots in theater. With the rise of voice-actor-specific training centers and audio-only productions, voice actors could start their careers working full time without any association to a broadcasting theater company. The term "seiyu" emerged to describe these voice actors who focused solely on voicing for anime productions. This boom lasted until the first half of the 1980s.

=== 1980s ===
In 1989, the voice actors of the five main stars of the animated television show Ronin Warriors (Nozomu Sasaki, Takeshi Kusao, Hiroshi Takemura, Tomohiro Nishimura and Daiki Nakamura) formed an all-male singing group called "NG5". The group was featured as the subject of a special documentary program on MBS.

During this period, voice acting production companies also began to provide specialised courses at on-site training schools specifically for training in animation dubbing.

=== 1990s ===
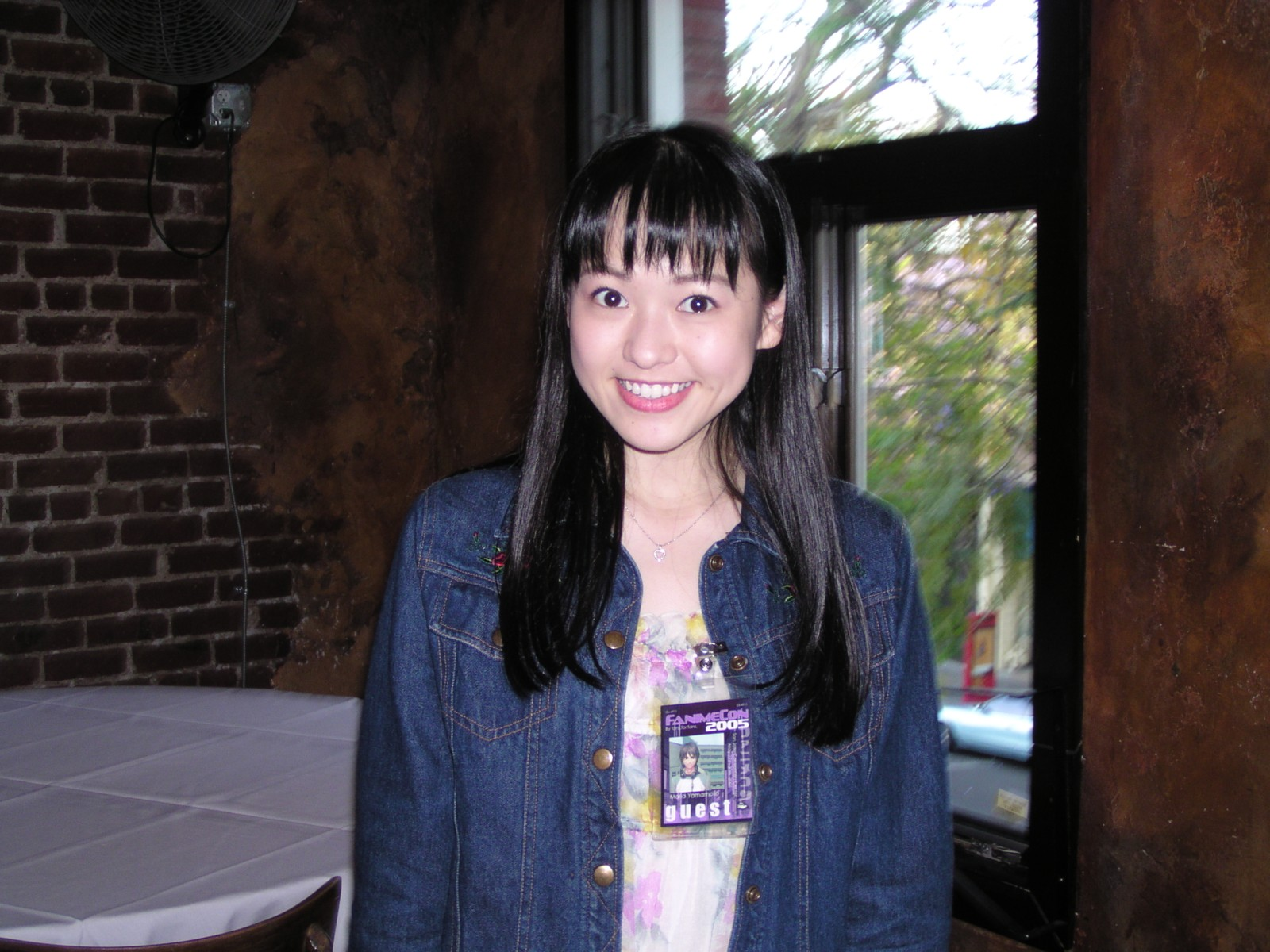
Voice actress Maria Yamamoto in 2005

The 1960s and 1970s booms were centered on media, such as the TV. In the 1990s, a new boom centred on more personal ways of communication, such as radio shows, Original Video Animation, television quizzes, public events and the Internet, gave way to the publication of the first dedicated voice acting magazines, Seiyū Grand Prix and Voice Animage. Voice actors acquired many new fans thanks to the radio, and their CD sale figures increased. Concerts began to be held in the bigger halls. While the second boom also saw the voice actors become DJs, this time the recording houses backed the voice actor radio shows as sponsors, and large sums of money began to circulate. Megumi Hayashibara, Hekiru Shiina and Mariko Kouda are the first examples of this new trend. Recording companies and voice acting schools began to devise new ways to raise young voice actors.

When voice acting was introduced in television games, the same voice actors would perform in a series of events related to the television game world, making appearances and participating in radio programs based on the television games to attract the fanbase.

In the second half of the 1990s, the boom in the animation world led to an increase of anime shown in the Tokyo area. With the Internet, gathering information on their favourite voice actors became easy for fans, and voice actors began to appear in Internet-based radio shows.

From 1994 to 2000, the world's first digital satellite radio broadcaster, St.GIGA, transmitted episodic video games with voice acted overdubs in a separate and continually streaming vocal track (a technique called SoundLink), to be played in Japan on Nintendo's Super Famicom video game console with its Satellaview peripheral. BS Zelda no Densetsu was identified by Nintendo as the world's first integrated radio-game.

=== 2000–present: Idol and real-life crossovers ===
During the mid-to-late 2000s, voice acting talents began crossing over with the Japanese idol industry. Prominent examples include Aya Hirano, Koharu Kusumi, Yukari Tamura and Nana Mizuki, all of whom were established actors or singers in mainstream entertainment before entering voice acting. While character song tie-ins were already common in the film industry by then, some voice actors also began making crossover television, stage, and concert appearances as their characters as well, leading them to be closely associated with one another. The term "2.5D", which picked up frequent usage in the mid-2010s, was used to describe voice actors who would portray their characters in real life, such as television or stage plays. Over the mid-to-late 2010s, multimedia projects where the voice actors would appear as their characters in real life became popular, such as The Idolmaster and Love Live! The magazine Seiyū Grand Prix noted that over 1,500 voice actors were active in 2021, compared to 370 voice actors (145 men and 225 women) in 2001.

== See also ==
- Seiyu Awards
- Japanese voice actor management companies

== Sources ==
- Clements, Jonathan; McCarthy, Helen (2015). The Anime Encyclopedia: A Century of Japanese Animation. Stone Bridge Press. ISBN 978-1-61172-018-1.
- Poitras, Gilles (2001). Anime Essentials: Every Thing a Fan Needs to Know. Stone Bridge Press. ISBN 978-1-880656-53-2.
