= The Quack Infantry Troop =

1940 Japanese anime short film

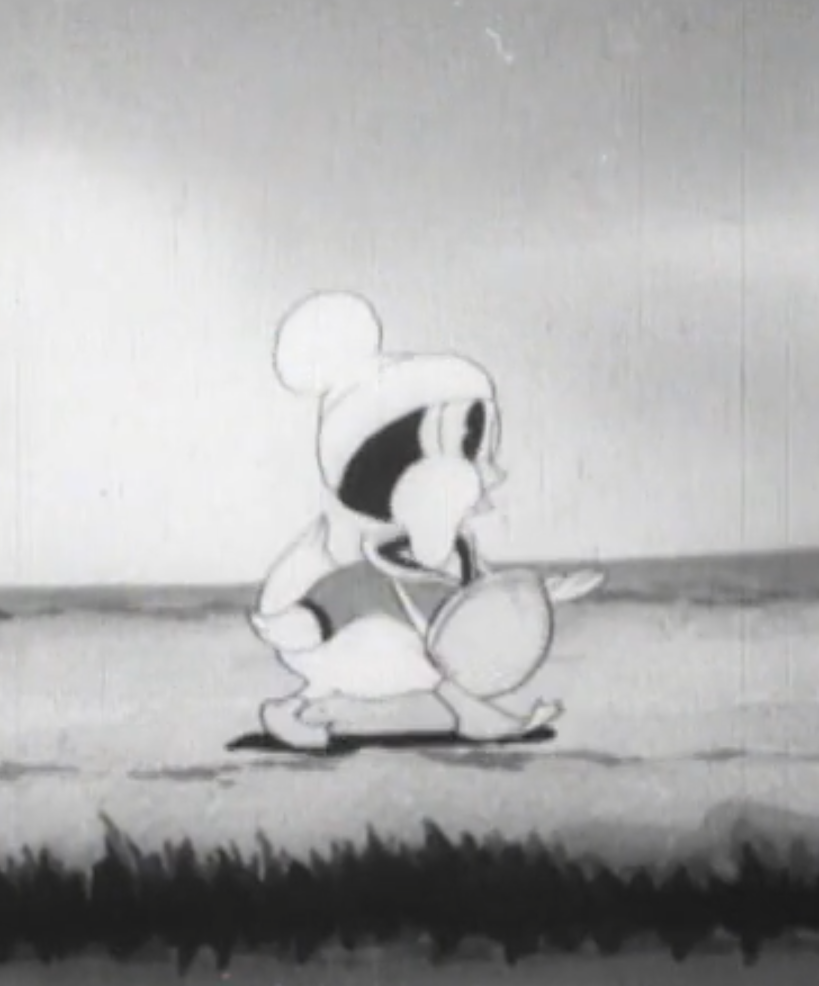
- An image from the anime: no official cover
- Original: あひる陸戦隊
- Japanese: Ahiru Rikusentai
- Genre: Action; Comedy
- Directed by: Mitsuyo Seo
- Music by: Tadashi Hattori
- Studio: Geijutsu Eigasha
- Distributor: Japanese Ministry of Education
- Release Date: 1940
- Runtime: 13 minutes

The Quack Infantry Troop (Original Title: あひる陸戦隊, Kana: Ahiru Rikusentai) is a 1940 comedy and action anime short film directed by Mitsuyo Seo that was produced by Geijutsu Eigasha and distributed by the Japanese Ministry of Education. It is a black and white short film which lasts 13 minutes at 24 fps.

== Plot ==
The story follows two main characters: a black frog and Kurosuke, a duck wearing a white beanie. Near the start of the episode, the black frog and his friend harass Kurosuke, making him go home crying. This is where two other ducks, Shirosuke and Gasuke, devise a plan to help Kurosuke by retaliating against the frogs. They launch the attack on the frogs with artillery fire, which causes the frogs to set sail in their battleship toward the ducks. Shots are fired by both sides, with Kurosuke firing from a hill with a machine gun and Shirosuke and Gasuke firing with artillery, until a pelican dives in and swoops up Kurosuke in its beak, flying over the frogs, allowing Kurosuke to fire at them. However, suddenly, a windy storm blows away Kurosuke until he reaches a tree with a hole in it. He enters for cover from the storm and encounters the black frog. Initially surprised, they back away, but then lightning strikes the tree, causing them to grab onto each other out of fear. The storm soon passes over, and they encounter themselves laughing with each other, signalling the end of the conflict.

== Production ==
A Multiplane camera was used alongside cel animation in production of The Quack Infantry Troop this allowed the effect of depth to be created in the short film.

The Quack Infantry Troop was recorded on 35mm nitrate positive. The existing version of the recording was repatriated from the Library of Congress and is now owned by the National Film Archive in Tokyo
