= Chikara to Onna no Yo no Naka =

1933 film

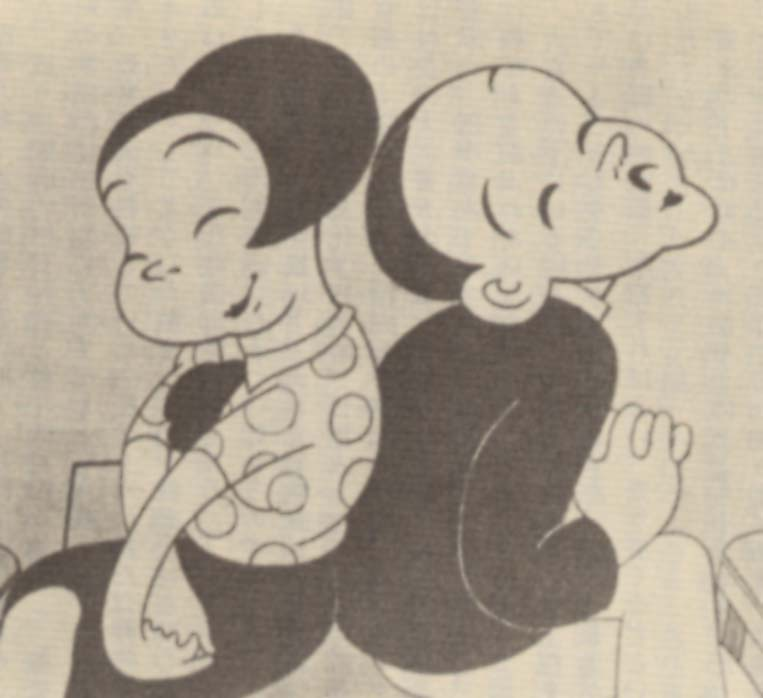
- The typist and the main character.
- Kanji: 力と女の世の中
- Directed by: Kenzō Masaoka
- Written by: Tadao Ikeda
- Produced by: Shiro Kido
- Music by: Masanori Imasawa
- Production company: Shochiku
- Release date: 13 April 1933
- Country: Japan
- Language: Japanese

Chikara to Onna no Yo no Naka (力と女の世の中; lit. 'Within the World of Power and Women" or "The World of Power and Women') is a 1933 anime short film by Kenzō Masaoka and the first Japanese anime of any type to feature voiceovers. The film was released in black and white. There are no known prints of this film available, and it is considered a lost film.

Chikara was listed as one of the "Best of Best" by the 12th Japan Media Arts Festival.

== Plot ==
The protagonist is a father of four children. His wife is 180 centimetres (5.9 ft) tall, and weighs 120 kilograms (260 lb) due to her incredibly large physique. Because he is constantly being henpecked at home, he becomes involved in an affair with a typist at his company and accidentally tells his wife about it while talking in his sleep. After obtaining additional evidence of the affair, she goes to confront both her husband and the typist at her husband's office.

== Production ==
In 1927, The Jazz Singer was released in the United States as the first talkie film, and Japanese film companies began working on creating them as well. Shochiku released The Neighbor's Wife and Mine (マダムと女房, Madamu to Nyōbō) in 1931, the first Japanese talkie. Due to the success of this film, the president of Shochiku, Shirō Kido, commissioned Masaoka to make the first anime talkie, and he began working on it immediately.

Masaoka worked on the film for a little over a year and finally completed it in October 1932. The film was released in theaters the following year on 13 April 1933. At this time, the job of voice actor did not exist, so Shochiku used regular actors for the voice parts. Casting well-known stars, such as Roppa Furukawa and Ranko Sawa (of the Takarazuka Revue), helped make the film a success.

== Staff ==
- Original Creator, Script: Tadao Ikeda
- Original Planning, Director: Kenzō Masaoka
- Animation: Mitsuyo Seo, Seiichi Harada, Saburō Yamamoto
- Photography: Kakuzan Kimura
- Producer: Shirō Kido
- Voiceover Director: Hiromasa Nomura
- Audio: Haruo Tsuchihashi
- Music Director: Masanori Imasawa

== Cast ==
- Roppa Furukawa as Main Character
- Ranko Sawa as Wife
- Yōko Murashima as Typist
- Akio Isono as Tarō
- Kōji Mitsui as Jiro (credited as Hideo Mitsui)
- Fusako Fujita as Hanako
- Yōko Fujita as Toshiko

== See also ==
- List of lost films
