= Roppa Furukawa =

Japanese comedian (1903–1961)

Roppa Furukawa 古川ロッパ
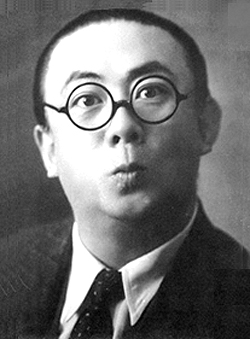
- Born: 3 August 1903; Tokyo, Japan
- Died: 16 January 1961 (aged 57)
- Occupations: Comedian, singer, film critic

Roppa Furukawa (古川ロッパ, also 緑波, Furukawa Roppa; 3 August 1903 – 16 January 1961) was a Japanese comedian.

== Career ==
Furukawa was born the sixth son of Baron Katō Terumaro (1863–1925), making him the grandson of Baron Katō Hiroyuki. The family custom, however, was to have the younger sons adopted by related families, so Furukawa was adopted by his father's sister and her husband, Furukawa Taketarō. His real name became Ikurō Furukawa (sometimes rendered "Ikuo"). He began attending Waseda University, but left before graduating in order to become a film critic and magazine editor. He worked under the pen name "Roppa". He was quite skilled at voice impersonation and eventually decided to become a professional comedian, forming in 1933 the comedy troupe "Warai no Tengoku" (Laughter Heaven) with Musei Tokugawa. He joined Toho in 1935 and, starring in stage revues and films, became nearly as popular as the other prewar comedic great, Ken'ichi Enomoto. His film work included many comedies, musicals, and a popular set of films co-starring Kazuo Hasegawa. After the war, his career went into decline as he began to suffer from various ailments, but he remained popular on radio. A skilled writer, his diaries were published to much acclaim before he died.

== Selected bibliography ==
- Furukawa, Roppa (1987–1988). Furukawa Roppa Shōwa nikki. Tokyo: Shōbunsha. ISBN 4794930674. OCLC 18049700.

== Selected filmography ==
- Chikara to Onna no Yo no Naka (力と女の世の中) (1933)
- Harikiri Bōi (ハリキリ・ボーイ) (1937)
- Otoko no hanamichi (男の花道) (1941)
- A Mother's Love (1950)

== See also ==
- Stephen Fumio Hamao - Nephew
