= Momotaro: Sacred Sailors =

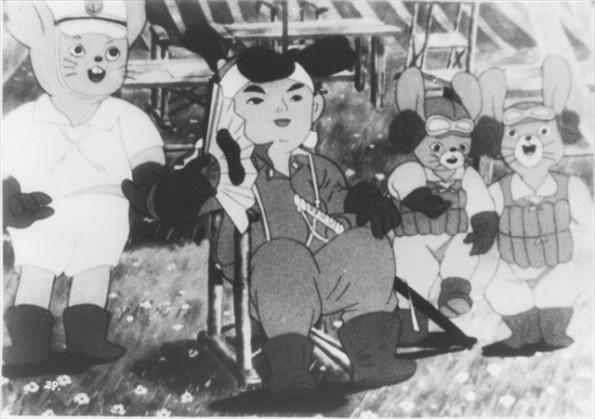
- Directed by: Mitsuyo Seo
- Written by: Mitsuyo Seo
- Cinematography: Mitsuyo Seo
- Music by: Yūji Koseki
- Production company: Shōchiku Dōga Kenkyūsho
- Distributed by: Shochiku
- Release date: 12 April 1945
- Running time: 74 minutes
- Country: Japan
- Languages: Japanese; English

Momotaro: Sacred Sailors (桃太郎 海の神兵, Momotarō: Umi no Shinpei) is the first Japanese feature-length animated film. It was directed by Mitsuyo Seo, who was ordered to make a propaganda film for World War II by the Japanese Naval Ministry. Shochiku Moving Picture Laboratory shot the 74-minute film in 1944 and screened it on 12 April 1945. It is a sequel to Momotarō no Umiwashi, a 37-minute film released in 1943 by the same director and also starring the traditional Momotarō character.

In English, the film is sometimes referred to as Momotaro's Divine Sea Warriors.

== Plot ==
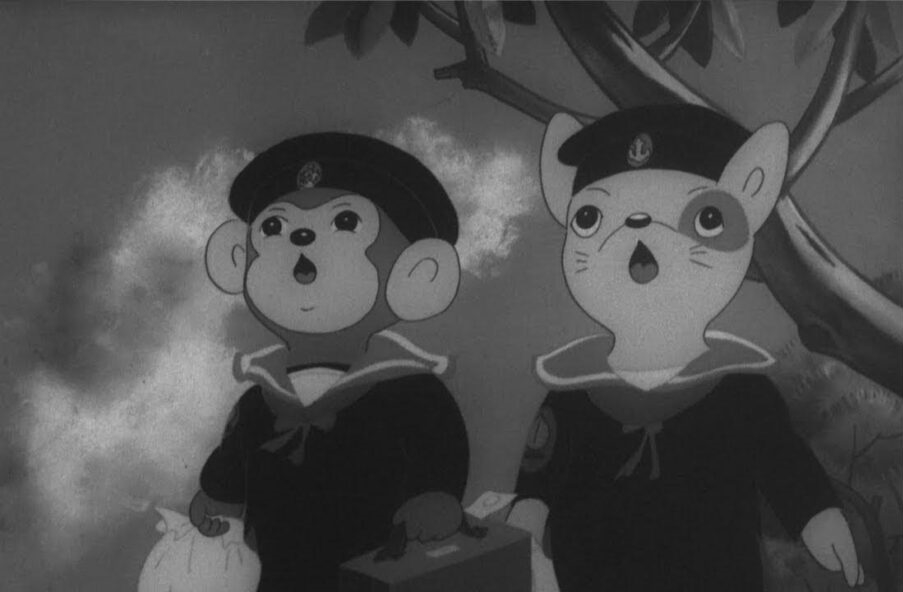
Screenshot from the film, where Monkey and Puppy are saying goodbye.

After completing naval training, a bear cub, a monkey, a pheasant, and a puppy say goodbye to their families. While they are preoccupied, the monkey's younger brother Santa falls into a river while chasing the monkey's cap and is carried towards a waterfall. The dog and monkey coordinate a rescue to save Santa just before he is swept downstream. They succeed and the monkey and his little brother then enjoy the scenery of Mt. Fuji and the surrounding land. While Santa frolics in the field chasing the cap in the wind, the monkey observes the dandelions spreading their seeds and is mesmerized by their beauty. The dandelions floating gently down remind the monkey of paratroopers descending from the sky, transitioning to a time skip. The Japanese forces are seen clearing a forest and constructing an airbase on a Pacific island with the help of the jungle animals who sing as they work. A plane lands at the airstrip and from inside emerges Momotaro, depicted as a General, together with the bear, monkey, dog, and pheasant, who by this point have become high-ranking officials. The animal residents of the island are shown as simple primitives who are star-struck by the glamorous and advanced Japanese animals. The subsequent scenes show the jungle animals being taught the Japanese kana via singing and they continue to sing the AIUEO song while washing and drying clothes and preparing meals. The officers then prepare ammunition and artillery for the warplanes.

Thereafter, a narration of the story of how the island of Celebes was acquired by the Dutch East India Company follows and it is revealed that the Japanese are attempting to invade it. The monkey, dog, and bear cub become parachute jumpers while the pheasant becomes a pilot. The paratroopers ambush a convoy of armoured cars and quickly invade a British fort, causing the unprepared British soldiers to panic and flee. Captain Momotaro, the monkey, and the puppy are then shown negotiating with three clearly terrified, stammering British officials. After a brief argument, the British agree to surrender Celebes and the surrounding islands to Japanese rule. A brief epilogue shows Santa and other children playing paratroopers and jumping onto a chalk outline of continental America. Thus, depicting the United States as the target of their generation.

There are some musical scenes. Of note is The Song of AIUEO (アイウエオの歌, AIUEO no Uta), a scene where Japanese soldiers teach local animals how to speak.

== Background ==
The Naval Ministry previously showed Seo Fantasia (1940), the Disney film. Inspired by this, Seo tried to give dreams to children, as well as to instill the hope for peace, just as he did in the film's predecessor, Momotaro's Sea Eagles. At that time, unlike German animation and American animation, Japanese animation was not fully promoted as a tool for propaganda by the Japanese government. Animation was not considered as effective as other media by Japanese government officials. As we can see in the first scene of the film, "For Little Citizens (小国民に捧ぐ Shôkokumin ni tsugu)", the film was designed for children.

For a long time, the film was presumed to have been confiscated and burned by the American occupation. However, a negative copy of the film was found in Shochiku's Ofuna warehouse in 1983 and was re-released in 1984. A reproduced film was later screened and the VHS package is now available in Japan.

== Legacy ==
The film was selected for screening as part of the Cannes Classics section at the 2016 Cannes Film Festival. UK-based company All the Anime announced in May 2016 that it would release the film on Blu-ray and in that same month it was also announced that US distributor Funimation would also be releasing the film on Blu-ray and DVD alongside Spider and Tulip on a single disc.

== See also ==
- List of anime by release date (1939–1945)
- Norakuro

== Sources ==
- Patten, Fred (2004) [First published in Animation World Magazine 1, no. 7, October 1996]. "Momotaro's Gods-Blessed Sea Warriors: Japan's Unknown Wartime Feature". Watching Anime, Reading Manga: 25 Years of Essays and Reviews. Berkeley, CA: Stone Bridge Press. pp. 325–328. ISBN 1-880656-92-2.
- Clements, Jonathan and Helen McCarthy (2001). The Anime Encyclopedia: A Guide to Japanese Animation Since 1917. Berkeley, CA: Stone Bridge Press. ISBN 1-880656-64-7.
- Clements, Jonathan (2018). Sacred Sailors: The Life and Work of Seo Mitsuyo. Glasgow: Anime Limited. ISBN 978-1-9997698-0-2.
