= Screwball Football =

1939 film by Fred Avery

- Title card
- Directed by: Fred Avery
- Story by: Melvin Millar
- Produced by: Leon Schlesinger
- Starring: Mel Blanc
- Music by: Carl W. Stalling
- Animation by: Virgil Ross
- Color process: Technicolor
- Production company: Leon Schlesinger Productions
- Distributed by: Warner Bros. Pictures
- Release date: December 2, 1939
- Running time: 7 min
- Country: United States
- Language: English

Screwball Football is a 1939 American animated comedy short film directed by Fred Avery. The short was released on December 2, 1939. It is part of the Merrie Melodies series. After Avery left for Metro-Goldwyn-Mayer, he directed a spiritual successor titled Batty Baseball in 1948.

== Plot ==
During the title card, a football player scores a touchdown but is hit on the head by a mallet. The narrator describes a highly anticipated football match which is inhabited by a "colorful" crowd (dressed in different jersey colors) and literally overflows out of the stadium due to overcrowding. Throughout the film, a man licks an infant's ice cream while he is distracted.

The football players are depicted as comically inept. They fight over a coin toss, while the player near the ball is accidentally kicked in kickoff. The ball is actually kicked by a player using another player as a golf club. The opposing team receives the ball, but the player is knocked out after the entire opposing team tackles him; the ball is resuscitated instead of him. The team reluctantly allows a benched young player to join, only to be grievously wounded offscreen. A player literally fades as described in the commentary before throwing it to a teammate, who them fumbles in favor of the opposing team. A touchdown occurs, but everyone tackles the player to the point the player is not sure if he scored. At the end of the first half, the referee accidentally shoots himself on the head and survives.

At the beginning of the second half, both teams switch sides, so do their supporters who move to opposing sides of the stadium. One team aggressively gives a pep talk to the coach instead of the other way round. One player is kicked alongside the ball, aggravating the player he lands on by kissing him. He rushes to the opposing side, bar an interruption by a radio ad, and scores a touchdown, causing their coach to literally yell his head off out of excitement. The film skips to the fourth quarter, but it ends immaturely as the players mistake a gunshot for the one that ends the match. The infant from earlier shoots the man dead for licking his ice cream, before continuing to lick his ice cream in peace.

== See also ==
- How to Play Football
