= Gilles Poitras =

Author of books relating to anime and manga

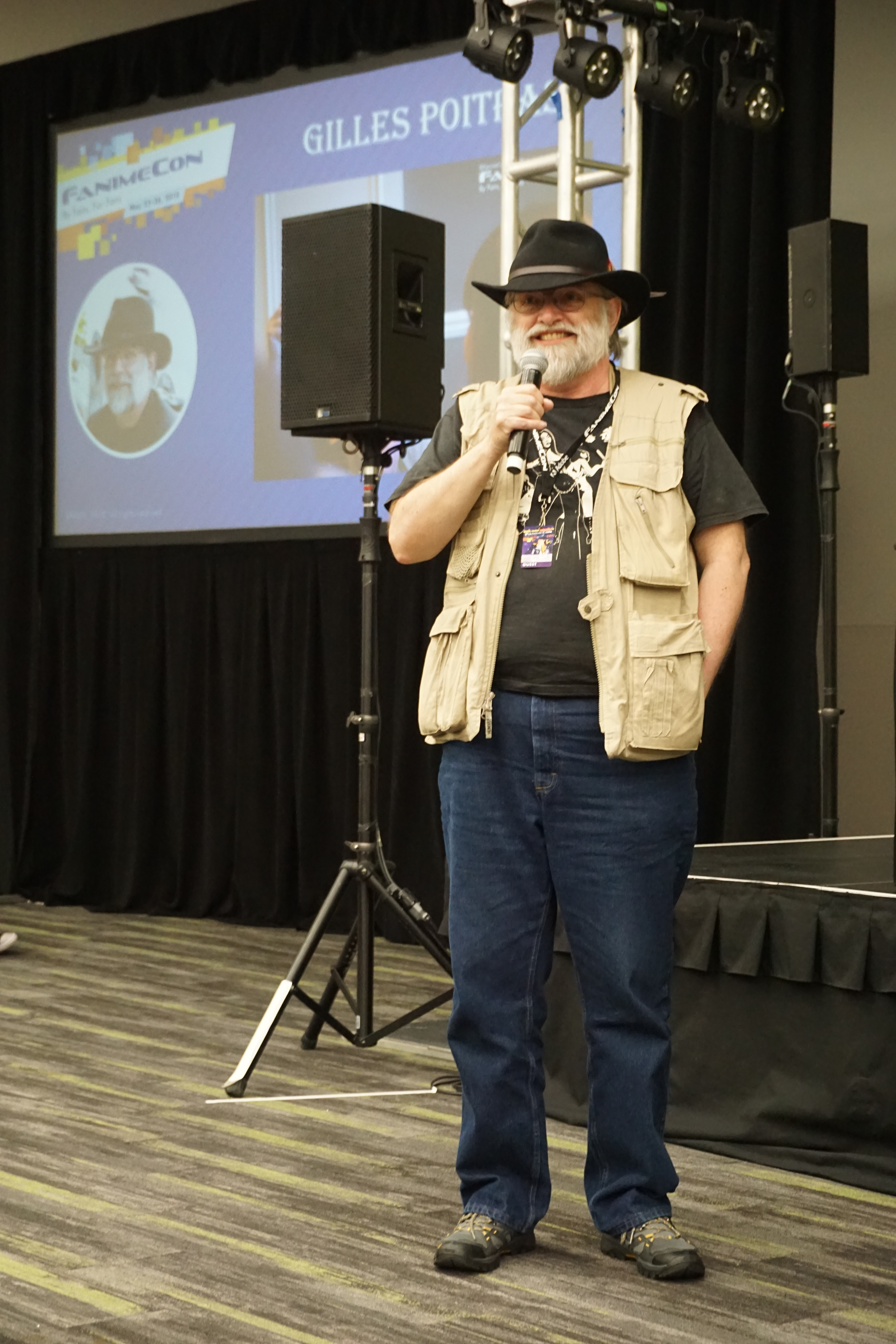
- Gilles Poitras at FanimeCon 2018
- Born: Quebec
- Education: University of California, Berkeley; Pacific School of Religion
- Occupation: Writer
- Website: www.koyagi.com

Gilles Poitras is a Canadian author of books relating to anime and manga. He is a librarian at Golden Gate University in San Francisco. In addition to the books he has authored, Poitras also regularly contributed columns to Newtype USA, a former monthly magazine which covered anime and manga industry and related popular culture.

Poitras has appeared in several documentaries discussing various aspects of anime and manga fan culture, and has been a guest at over 35 fan and industry conventions.

== Education ==
Born in Quebec, Poitras has two Master's degrees, a Library Science Master's from the University of California at Berkeley and a Master's in Theology from Pacific School of Religion in Berkeley.

== Books ==
Listed chronologically in ascending order:

- Poitras, Gilles (September 1, 1999). The Anime Companion: What's Japanese in Japanese Animation?. Stone Bridge Press. ISBN 978-1-880656-32-7.
- —— (December 1, 2001). Anime Essentials: Every Thing a Fan Needs to Know. Stone Bridge Press. ISBN 978-1-880656-53-2.
- —— (June 1, 2005). The Anime Companion 2: More What's Japanese in Japanese Animation?. Stone Bridge Press. ISBN 978-1-880656-96-9.
- —— (February 9, 2021). Tokyo Stroll: A Guide to City Sidetracks and Easy Explorations. Stone Bridge Press. ISBN 978-1-611720-58-7.
