= Momotarō's Sea Eagles =

1943 Japanese animated film

Momotarō no Umiwashi
- Directed by: Mitsuyo Seo
- Written by: Mitsuyo Seo
- Music by: Noboru Itō
- Release date: 25 March 1943
- Running time: 37 minutes
- Country: Japan
- Language: Japanese

Momotarō's Sea Eagles

Momotarō's Sea Eagles (Japanese: 桃太郎の海鷲, Hepburn: Momotarō no Umiwashi) is a Japanese animated propaganda film produced in 1942 by Geijutsu Eigasha and released on 25 March 1943. With a running time of 37 minutes, it was close to being a feature-length film.

A DVD version without English subtitles was released in Japan by the bookstore chain Kinokuniya Shoten in 2004; a version with English subtitles was released in the United States by Zakka Films in 2009.

Although recorded as being produced with the cooperation of the Japanese Naval Ministry, there was in fact no such cooperation (due to concerns about official military secrets). However, the Japanese Imperial Navy did endorse the film.

Featuring the "Peach Boy" character of Japanese folklore, the film was aimed at children, and tells the story of a naval unit consisting of the young boy Momotarō and several animal species representing the Far Eastern races fighting together for a common goal. In a dramatization of the attack on Pearl Harbor, the force attacks the demons at the appropriately named island of Onigashima ('Demon Island', which represents the British and American military). The film also utilizes actual footage of the Pearl Harbor attack. A sequel, Momotaro: Sacred Sailors, was released in 1945, which was the first full-length Japanese animated film.

== Plot ==
The film opens on board an aircraft carrier on rough waters, with squadrons of monkeys, pheasants, and dogs preparing their planes for war. These animals are not perfect soldiers however; they act in a silly way, giving them a very human feel. At the center stands a young heroic boy named Momotaro, giving orders to the animals, who board their planes and take off. The flight to Hawaii passes without incident, apart from a monkey helping a lost baby bird find its parent.

The animals arrive and the attack begins. The soldiers aboard the ships docked in Pearl Harbor panic and scramble, trying to flee; as evidenced by a large amount of bottles lying around, some are too drunk to move or think properly. The main soldier shown is stupid, overweight, and cowardly. As the attack continues, some monkeys go on land to destroy American planes. The main American soldier literally shakes the red and blue off the American flag to wave it as a white flag of surrender. Pearl Harbor is left in smoking ruins as the animals return to the aircraft carrier to celebrate.

== Propaganda use ==
The Japanese government used the character of Momotaro as the hero because the story (dating back to the Edo period) was extremely well known in Japan – comparable to the Three Little Pigs in Western countries. In the film, Momotaro and the animal characters were not only lovable but were already known for their heroic personality traits. The "pretty characters and comical battle scenes enabled Japanese citizens to watch a war movie without hesitation". In addition, the original story features Momotaro and his companions travelling to a demon-inhabited island, which this film replaced with the American-infested Hawaii, creating a direct link between foreigners and evil creatures.

From 1942 to 1945, "national policy films" (AKA propaganda films) made up a large percentage of Japanese cinema. Momotaro's Sea Eagles was an extremely successful example of this, and was especially popular among young children. The 37-minute film was so well received that a 74-minute sequel, Momotaro's Divine Sea Warriors, was released in 1945. The cute and entertaining sequel – in which no fatalities are shown – was intended to give the war a soft, righteous feel.

== National stereotypes depicted in the film ==
The fictional character Bluto, the main antagonist of the Popeye cartoons, makes an appearance in this film as a stereotypical drunk. This is one of a number of examples of Axis nations using American cartoon characters to portray the United States in animated films, just as the Allied forces used Hitler, Mussolini, and Emperor Hirohito, as well as Nazis and Japanese soldiers in their propaganda films.

== Trivia ==
The film is predated by two years by the Chinese production Princess Iron Fan, which was 73 minutes long and is therefore recognised as the first Asian animated feature film.
