= Mitsuyo Seo =

Japanese animation film director

- 瀬尾 光世
- Born: September 26, 1911; Himeji, Hyōgo Prefecture, Japan
- Died: August 24, 2010 (aged 98)
- Occupations: Animator; Children's book illustrator
- Years active: 1931–1949 (Animator); 1949-? (Illustrator)

Mitsuyo Seo (瀬尾 光世, Seo Mitsuyo; 26 September 1911 – 24 August 2010) was a Japanese animator, screenwriter, and director of animated films who played a central role in the development of Japanese anime.

== Career ==
Initially working as a sign painter, Seo began dabbling in drawing animation by working at a toy film company that made short movies for home entertainment. Although his most famous films were propaganda for Japan during World War II, Seo's political sympathies were leftist, and early on, he was actually a member of the Proletarian Film League of Japan, where he helped out on such animated films as Sankichi no Kūchū Ryokō. In 1931, he was arrested for his activities, tortured, and spent 21 days in jail. Seo met Kenzō Masaoka and joined his company, working on Japan's first sound animation film, Chikara to Onna no Yo no Naka, before starting his own production company in 1935, where he made cartoons featuring the character Norakuro. He joined the Geijutsu Eigasha studio in 1937 and made Ari-chan in 1941, the first Japanese work to fully use the multiplane camera. His most famous works are two propaganda animated films produced during World War II: Momotarō no Umiwashi, which featured Momotarō and his animals bombing Pearl Harbor; and its sequel, Momotarō: Umi no Shinpei, which was made for Shōchiku and was Japan's first real feature length animated film. (Momotarō no Umiwashi was advertised at the time as the first feature-length anime, but since it is only 37 minutes long, today most recognize the 74-minute Umi no Shinpei as the first.) Osamu Tezuka, the father of Japanese manga and a later anime artist himself, said he was so impressed with Umi no Shinpei as a teenager that he wanted to become an animator for a time. After the war, Seo joined Nihon Manga Eigasha and made the film Ōsama no Shippo as a pro-democracy anime in 1949, but when Tōhō, which was supposed to distribute it, found it politically too leftist, the film was left without a distributor. Nihon Manga Eigasha went bankrupt, and Seo, finding the conditions for animation in the immediate postwar too difficult, left the industry and became an illustrator for children's books.

== Death ==
He died on 24 August 2010 at the age of 98.

== Selected filmography ==
- Sankichi no Kūchū Ryokō (三吉の空中旅行, 1931), Animation
- Chikara to Onna no Yo no Naka (力と女の世の中, 1933), Animation
- Ari-chan (アリチャン, 1941), Director
- Momotarō no Umiwashi (Momotaro's Sea Eagles, 桃太郎の海鷲, 1942), Director, Animation, Photography
- Momotarō: Umi no Shinpei (Momotaro's Divine Sea Warriors, 桃太郎 海の神兵, 1945), Director, Script, Photography
- Ōsama no Shippo (王様のしっぽ, 1949), Director, Script

== See also ==
- History of anime
