= Kumo to Tulip =

1943 short animated Japanese film

Kumo to Tulip (くもとちゅうりっぷ, Kumo to Chūrippu; lit. 'Spider and Tulip') is a short animated Japanese film made in 1943 by Kenzo Masaoka. It is a story about a ladybug being chased by a black-faced spider. The spider catches the ladybug, but then it rains, the spider drowns, and the ladybug is freed by a friendly fly.

In 2001, the Japanese magazine Animage elected Kumo to Tulip one of the greatest anime productions of all time.

The short-film was screened at the Locarno Film Festival and the Barbican Centre's Barbican Animation Show.

== Plot ==
A spider wants to lure a beetle-girl into his net by singing, but she recognizes the danger and flees. She saves herself in a tulip, in which she is then wrapped by the spider's thread. Shortly after, a storm rises, which the beetle-girl (protected by the flower) survives, but the spider gets thrown through the air until he finally lands in a puddle.

== Release and Production ==
The film was produced in 1943 under the direction of Kenzo Masaoka by Shochiku Doga Kenkyujo. The music was composed by Ryutaro Hirota.

The film was released on April 15, 1943, in Japanese cinemas.

Funimation released the film on Blu-ray and DVD alongside Momotaro: Sacred Sailors on a single disc.
