= Anime =

Japanese animation

Trailer for the 2022 anime Heroines Run the Show

Anime (Japanese: アニメ; IPA: [aꜜɲime]; (Note: English: /ˈænɪmeɪ/) derived from a shortening of the English word animation) is animation originating from Japan. Outside Japan and in English, anime refers specifically to animation produced in Japan. However, anime, in Japan and in Japanese, describes all animated works, regardless of style or origin. Many works of animation with a similar style to Japanese animation are also produced outside Japan. Video games sometimes also feature themes and art styles that may be labelled as anime.

The earliest commercial Japanese animation dates to 1917. A characteristic art style emerged in the 1960s with the works of cartoonist Osamu Tezuka and spread in the following decades, developing a large domestic audience. Anime is distributed theatrically, through television broadcasts, directly to home media, and over the Internet. In addition to original works, anime are often adaptations of Japanese comics (manga), light novels, or video games. It is classified into numerous genres targeting various broad and niche audiences.

Anime is a diverse medium with distinctive production methods that have adapted in response to emergent technologies. Historically and predominantly hand-drawn, anime combines graphic art, characterization, cinematography, and other forms of imaginative and individualistic techniques. Compared to Western animation, anime production generally focuses less on movement and more on the detail of settings and use of "camera effects", such as panning, zooming, and angle shots. Diverse art styles are used, and character proportions and features can be quite varied, with a common characteristic feature being large and emotive eyes.

The anime industry consists of over 430 production companies, including major studios such as Studio Ghibli, Kyoto Animation, Sunrise, Bones, Ufotable, MAPPA, Wit Studio, CoMix Wave Films, Madhouse, Inc., TMS Entertainment, Studio Pierrot, Production I.G, Nippon Animation and Toei Animation. Since the 1980s, the medium has also seen widespread international success with the rise of foreign dubbed and subtitled programming, and since the 2010s due to the rise of streaming services and a widening demographic embrace of anime culture, both within Japan and worldwide. As of 2016, Japanese animation accounted for 60% of the world's animated television shows. By 2022, anime had become one of the fastest-growing genres of content globally. The medium is currently characterised by increased globalization, expansive cross-cultural collaboration, and significant brand integration, as Japanese-produced animation continues to influence and shape media and popular culture on a global scale.

== Etymology ==
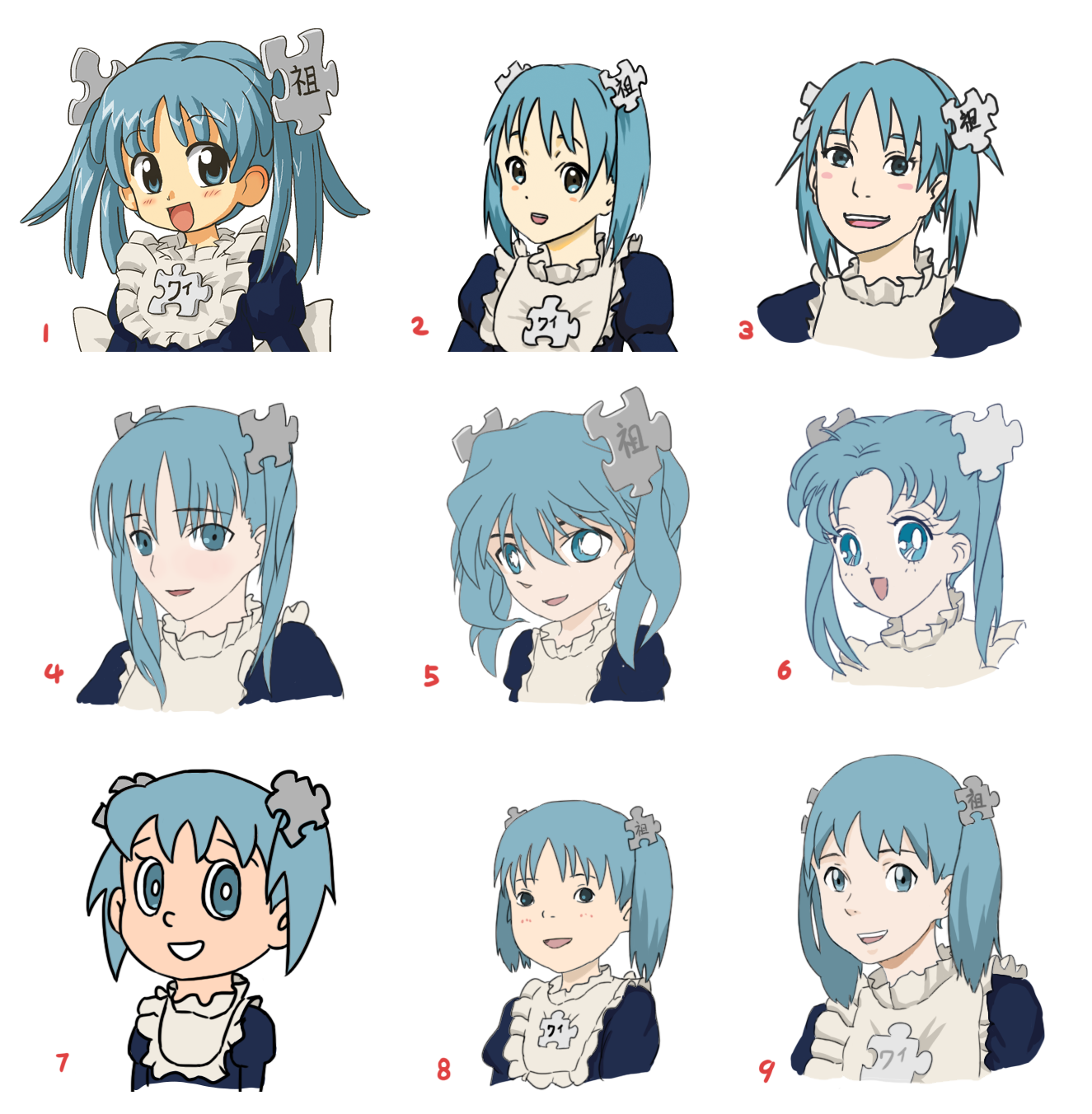
Nine diverse anime art styles

As a medium of animation, anime is an art form that comprises many genres found in other mediums; it is sometimes mistakenly classified as a genre itself. In Japanese, the term anime is used to refer to all animated works, regardless of style or origin. English-language dictionaries typically define anime (/ˈænɪmeɪ/) as "a style of Japanese animation" or as "a style of animation originating in Japan". Other definitions are based on origin, making production in Japan a requisite for a work to be considered "anime".

The etymology of the word anime is disputed. The English word "animation" is written in Japanese katakana as アニメーション (animēshon) and as アニメ (anime, pronounced [a.ɲi.me]) in its shortened form. Some sources claim that the term is derived from the French term for animation dessin animé ("cartoon", literally 'animated drawing'), but others believe this to be a myth derived from the popularity of anime in France in the late 1970s and 1980s.

In English, anime—when used as a common noun—normally functions as a mass noun. (For example: "Do you watch anime?" or "How much anime have you watched?") As with a few other Japanese words, such as saké and Pokémon, English texts sometimes spell anime as animé (as in French), with an acute accent over the final e, to cue the reader to pronounce the letter, not to leave it silent as English orthography may suggest. Prior to the widespread use of anime, the term Japanimation, a portmanteau of Japan and animation, was prevalent throughout the 1970s and 1980s. In the mid-1980s, the term anime began to supplant Japanimation; in general, the latter term now only appears in period works where it is used to distinguish and identify Japanese animation.

== History ==
=== Precursors ===
Emakimono and shadow plays (kage-e) are considered precursors to Japanese animation. Emakimono was a common form of entertainment in the 11th century. Traveling storytellers narrated legends and anecdotes while the emakimono was unrolled from the right to left in chronological order, as a moving panorama. Kage-e was popular during the Edo period and originated from the shadow plays of China. Magic lanterns from the Netherlands were also popular in the 18th century. The paper play called kamishibai surged in the 12th century and remained popular in street theater until the 1930s. Puppets of the Bunraku theater and ukiyo-e prints are considered ancestors of characters of most Japanese animation. Finally, manga was a heavy inspiration for anime. Cartoonists Kitzawa Rakuten and Okamoto Ippei used film elements in their strips.

=== Pioneers ===
Namakura Gatana (1917), the oldest surviving Japanese animated short film made for cinemas

Animation in Japan began in the early 20th century, when filmmakers started to experiment with techniques pioneered in France, Germany, the United States, and Russia. A claim for the earliest Japanese animation is Katsudō Shashin (c. 1907), a private work by an unknown creator. In 1917, the first professional and publicly displayed works began to appear; animators such as Ōten Shimokawa, Seitarō Kitayama, and Jun'ichi Kōuchi (known as the "fathers of anime") produced numerous films, with the oldest surviving one being Kōuchi's Namakura Gatana. Many early works were lost in the destruction of Shimokawa's warehouse during the 1923 Great Kantō earthquake.

By the mid-1930s, animation was well-established in Japan as an alternative format to live action works. It suffered competition from foreign producers, such as Disney, and many animators, including Noburō Ōfuji and Yasuji Murata, continued to work with cheaper cutout animation rather than cel animation. Other creators, including Kenzō Masaoka and Mitsuyo Seo, nevertheless made great strides in technique, benefiting from the patronage of the government, which employed animators to produce educational shorts and propaganda. In 1940, the government dissolved several artists' organizations to form the Shin Nippon Mangaka Kyōkai. (Note: Japanese: 新日本漫画家協会; lit. "New Japan Manga Artist Association") The first talkie anime was Chikara to Onna no Yo no Naka (1933), a short film produced by Masaoka. The first feature-length anime film was Momotaro: Sacred Sailors (1945), produced by Seo with a sponsorship from the Imperial Japanese Navy. The 1950s saw a proliferation of short, animated advertisements created for television.

=== Modern era ===
Frame from the opening sequence of Osamu Tezuka's 1963 TV series Astro Boy

In the 1960s, manga artist and animator Osamu Tezuka adapted and simplified Disney animation techniques to reduce costs and limit frame counts in his productions. Originally intended as temporary measures to allow him to produce material on a tight schedule with inexperienced staff, many of his limited animation practices came to define the medium's style. Three Tales (1960) was the first anime film broadcast on television; the first anime television series was Instant History (1961–64). An early and influential success was Astro Boy (1963–66), a television series directed by Tezuka based on his manga of the same name. Many animators at Tezuka's Mushi Production later established major anime studios, among those being Madhouse, Sunrise, and Studio Pierrot. Sazae-san, which began broadcasting in 1969, is the longest-running animated television series. As of April 2026, 2,848 episodes have been broadcast. Each episode consists of three self-contained segments, each with its own title and an independent storyline. As a result, the total number of individually titled segments had already exceeded 8,000 by 2022.

The 1970s saw growth in the popularity of manga, many of which later received animated adaptations. Tezuka's work—and that of other pioneers in the field—inspired characteristics and genres that remain fundamental elements of anime today. The giant robot genre (also known as "mecha"), for instance, took shape under Tezuka, developed into the super robot genre under Go Nagai and others, and was revolutionized at the end of the decade by Yoshiyuki Tomino, who developed the real robot genre. Robot anime series such as Gundam, Space Runaway Ideon, and Super Dimension Fortress Macross were influential classics in the 1980s, and the genre remained one of the most popular in the following decades. The bubble economy of the 1980s spurred a new era of high-budget and experimental anime films, including Nausicaä of the Valley of the Wind (1984), Royal Space Force: The Wings of Honnêamise (1987), and Akira (1988).

Experimental anime titles continued to draw attention in the 1990s, as Neon Genesis Evangelion (1995), Ghost in the Shell (1995) and Cowboy Bebop (1998) garnered international popularity. During this period, anime began attracting greater interest in Western countries; other international successes include Dragon Ball Z and Sailor Moon, both of which were dubbed into more than a dozen languages worldwide. In 2003, Spirited Away, a Studio Ghibli feature film directed by Hayao Miyazaki, won the Academy Award for Best Animated Feature at the 75th Academy Awards. It later became the highest-grossing anime film, (Note: Spirited Away was later surpassed as the highest-grossing anime film by Your Name (2016).) grossing more than $355 million worldwide. Since the 2000s, an increased number of anime works have been adaptations of light novels and visual novels; successful examples include The Melancholy of Haruhi Suzumiya and Fate/stay night (both 2006). Demon Slayer: Kimetsu no Yaiba the Movie: Mugen Train became the highest-grossing Japanese film and one of the world's highest-grossing films of 2020. It also became the fastest-grossing film in Japanese cinema history, earning 10 billion yen ($95.3m; £72m) in 10 days. It beat the previous record holder Spirited Away, which took 25 days to gross the same amount.

In 2021, the anime adaptations of Jujutsu Kaisen, Demon Slayer: Kimetsu no Yaiba and Tokyo Revengers were among the top 10 most discussed TV shows worldwide on Twitter. In 2022, Attack on Titan won the award of "Most In-Demand TV Series in the World 2021" at the Global TV Demand Awards. Attack on Titan became the first ever non-English language series to earn the title of World's Most In-Demand TV Show, previously held by only The Walking Dead and Game of Thrones. In 2024, Jujutsu Kaisen broke the Guinness World Record for the "Most in-demand animated TV show" with a global demand rating 71.2 times higher than that of the average TV show, previously held by Attack on Titan.

== Attributes ==
Anime artists employ many distinct visual styles. Clockwise from the top left: Dead Leaves, Flag, Serial Experiments Lain, Monster, Mind Game, Lucky Star, Cat Soup, and Gurren Lagann.

Anime differs from other forms of animation with its art styles, methods of animation, production, and process. Visually, anime works exhibit a wide variety of art styles, differing between creators, artists, and studios. While no single art style predominates anime as a whole, they do share some similar attributes in terms of animation technique and character design.

Anime is fundamentally characterized by the use of limited animation, flat expression, the suspension of time, its thematic range, the presence of historical figures, its complex narrative line and, above all, a peculiar drawing style, with characters characterized by large and oval eyes, with very defined lines, bright colors and reduced movement of the lips.

=== Technique ===
Modern anime follows a typical animation production process, involving storyboarding, voice acting, character design, and cel production. Since the 1990s, animators have increasingly used computer animation to improve the efficiency of the production process. Early anime works were experimental, and consisted of images drawn on blackboards, stop motion animation of paper cutouts, and silhouette animation. Cel animation grew in popularity until it came to dominate the medium. In the 21st century, the use of other animation techniques is mostly limited to independent short films, including the stop motion puppet animation work produced by Tadahito Mochinaga, Kihachirō Kawamoto and Tomoyasu Murata. Computers were integrated into the animation process in the 1990s, with works such as Ghost in the Shell (1995) and Princess Mononoke (1997) mixing cel animation with computer-generated imagery. Fuji Film, a major cel production company, announced it would cease cel production, causing an industry panic to procure cel imports and hastening the switch to digital processes.

Prior to the digital era, anime was produced with traditional animation methods using a pose to pose approach. The majority of mainstream anime uses fewer expressive key frames and more in-between animation.

Japanese animation studios were pioneers of many limited animation techniques, and have given anime a distinct set of conventions. Unlike, for example: Disney animation, where the emphasis is on the movement, anime emphasizes the art quality and lets limited animation techniques make up for the lack of time spent on movement. Such techniques are often used not only to meet deadlines but also as artistic devices. Anime scenes often place emphasis on achieving three-dimensional views, and backgrounds are instrumental in creating the atmosphere of the work. The backgrounds are not always purely fictional and are occasionally based on real locations, as exemplified in Lucky Star and The Melancholy of Haruhi Suzumiya. John Oppliger stated that anime is one of the rare mediums where putting together an all-star cast usually comes out looking "tremendously impressive".

The cinematic effects of anime differentiates itself from the stage plays found in American animation. Anime is cinematically shot as if by camera, including panning, zooming, and distance and angle shots to more complex dynamic shots that would be difficult to produce in reality. In anime, the animation is almost always produced before the voice acting, contrary to American animation, where the voice acting typically comes first.

=== Characters ===
Anime character design is diverse, but often incorporates common elements depending on the target demographic and era. These are representative samples. Clockwise from the top left: Ashita no Joe (1970), Macross: Do You Remember Love? (1984), Ghost in the Shell (1995), K-On! (2009), Your Name (2016), The Hidden Dungeon Only I Can Enter (2021), Fruits Basket (2001), and Rurouni Kenshin (1996).

The body proportions of human anime characters tend to accurately reflect the proportions of the human body in reality. The height of the head is usually considered by the artist as the base unit of proportion. Head to height ratios vary drastically by art style, with most anime characters falling between 5 and 8 heads tall. Anime artists occasionally make deliberate modifications to body proportions to produce chibi characters that feature a disproportionately small body compared to the head; many chibi characters are two to four heads tall. Some anime works like Crayon Shin-chan completely disregard these proportions, in such a way that they resemble caricatured Western cartoons.

A common anime character design convention is exaggerated eye size. The animation of characters with large eyes in anime can be traced back to Osamu Tezuka, who was deeply influenced by early animation characters such as the ones by Walt Disney and Betty Boop, who were drawn with disproportionately large eyes. Tezuka is a central figure in anime and manga history, whose iconic art style and character designs allowed for the entire range of human emotions to be depicted solely through the eyes. The artist may add variable color shading to the eyes and particularly to the cornea to give them greater depth. Generally, a mixture of a light shade, the tone color, and a dark shade is used. However, not all anime characters have large eyes. For example, the works of Hayao Miyazaki are known for having realistically proportioned eyes, as well as realistic hair colors on their characters.

Hair in anime is often unnaturally lively and colorful or uniquely styled. The movement of hair in anime is exaggerated and "hair actions" are used to emphasize the action and emotions of characters for added visual effect. Artist Gilles Poitras traces hairstyle color to cover illustrations on manga, where eye-catching artwork and colorful tones are considered appealing for children's manga. Some anime will depict non-Japanese characters with specific ethnic features, such as a pronounced nose and jutting jaw for European characters. In other cases, anime feature characters whose ethnicity or nationality is not always defined, and this is often a deliberate decision, such as in the Pokémon animated series.

Anime and manga artists often draw from a common canon of iconic facial expression illustrations to denote particular moods and thoughts. These techniques are often different in form than their counterparts in Western animation, and they include a fixed iconography that is used as shorthand for certain emotions and moods. For example, a male character may develop a nosebleed when sexually aroused. A variety of visual symbols are employed, including sweat drops to depict nervousness, symbolized red veins for anger, visible blushing for embarrassment, or glowing eyes for an intense glare. Another recurring sight gag is the use of chibi (deformed, simplified character designs) figures to comedically punctuate emotions like confusion or embarrassment.

=== Music ===
An example of a 2022 anime video with music

The opening and credits sequences of most anime television series are accompanied by J-pop or J-rock songs, often by reputed bands—as written with the series in mind—but are also aimed at the general music market; therefore they often allude (only vaguely or not at all) to the thematic settings or plot of the series. Also, they are often used as incidental music ("insert songs") in an episode, in order to highlight particularly important scenes.

Future funk, a musical microgenre that evolved in the early 2010s from vaporwave with a French house and Eurodisco influence, heavily uses anime visuals and samples along with Japanese city pop to build an aesthetic.

Since the 2020s, anime songs have experienced a rapid growth in global online popularity due to their widened availability on music streaming services such as Spotify and promotion by fans and artists on social media. In 2023, the opening theme "Idol" by Yoasobi of the anime series Oshi no Ko topped the Billboard Global 200 Excl. U.S. charts with 45.7 million streams and 24,000 copies sold outside the U.S. "Idol" has become the first Japanese song and anime song to top the Billboard Global chart, as well as to take the top spot on Apple Music's Top 100: Global chart.

=== Genres ===
Anime are often classified by target demographic, including children's (子供, kodomo), girls' (少女, shōjo), boys' (少年, shōnen), young men (青年, seinen), young women (女性, josei) and a diverse range of genres targeting an adult audience. Shōjo and shōnen anime sometimes contain elements popular with children of all genders in an attempt to gain crossover appeal. Adult anime may feature a slower pace or greater plot complexity that younger audiences may typically find unappealing, as well as adult themes and situations. A subset of adult anime works featuring pornographic elements are labeled "R18" in Japan, and are internationally known as hentai (originating from the Japanese word for pervert (変態, hentai)). By contrast, some anime subgenres incorporate ecchi, sexual themes or undertones without depictions of sexual intercourse, as typified in the comedic or harem genres; due to its popularity among adolescent and adult anime enthusiasts, the inclusion of such elements is considered a form of fan service. Some genres explore homosexual romances, such as yaoi (male homosexuality) and yuri (female homosexuality). While often used in a pornographic context, the terms yaoi and yuri can also be used broadly in a wider context to describe or focus on the themes or the development of the relationships themselves.

Anime's genre classification differs from other types of animation and does not lend itself to simple classification. Gilles Poitras compared the labeling of Gundam 0080 and its complex depiction of war as a "giant robot" anime akin to simply labeling War and Peace a "war novel". Science fiction is a major anime genre and includes important historical works like Tezuka's Astro Boy and Yokoyama's Tetsujin 28-go. A major subgenre of science fiction is mecha, with the Gundam metaseries being iconic. The diverse fantasy genre includes works based on Asian and Western traditions and folklore; examples include the Japanese feudal fairytale Inuyasha, and the depiction of Scandinavian goddesses who move to Japan to maintain a computer called Yggdrasil in Ah! My Goddess. Genre crossing in anime is also prevalent, such as the blend of fantasy and comedy in Dragon Half, and the incorporation of slapstick humor in the crime anime film The Castle of Cagliostro. Other subgenres found in anime include magical girl, harem, sports, martial arts, medievalism, and war, along with literary adaptations.

=== Formats ===
Early anime works were made for theatrical viewing, and required played musical components before sound and vocal components were added to the production. In 1958, Nippon Television aired Mogura no Abanchūru ("Mole's Adventure"), both the first televised and first color anime to debut. It was not until the 1960s when the first televised series were broadcast and it has remained a popular medium since. Works released in a direct-to-video format are known as "original video animations" (OVAs) or "original animation videos" (OAVs); and are typically not released theatrically or televised prior to home media release. The emergence of the Internet has led some animators to distribute works online in a format called "original net animation" (ONA)

The home distribution of anime releases was popularized in the 1980s with the VHS and LaserDisc formats. The VHS NTSC video format used in both Japan and the United States is credited with aiding the rising popularity of anime in the 1990s. The LaserDisc and VHS formats were transcended by the DVD format which offered unique advantages, including multiple subtitling and dubbing tracks on the same disc. The DVD format also had its drawbacks in its usage of region coding, adopted by the industry to combat licensing, piracy and exporting, as well as usage in restricted regions indicated on the DVD player. The Video CD (VCD) format was popular in Hong Kong and Taiwan, but became only a minor format in the United States that was closely associated with bootleg copies.

Whereas many American television series had an episodic format, with each episode typically consisting of a self-contained story, anime series, such as Dragon Ball Z, had a serialization format, where continuous story arcs stretch over multiple episodes or seasons, thus distinguishing them from traditional American shows; serialization has since also become a common characteristic of American streaming television shows during the "Golden Age of Television" era.

== Industry ==
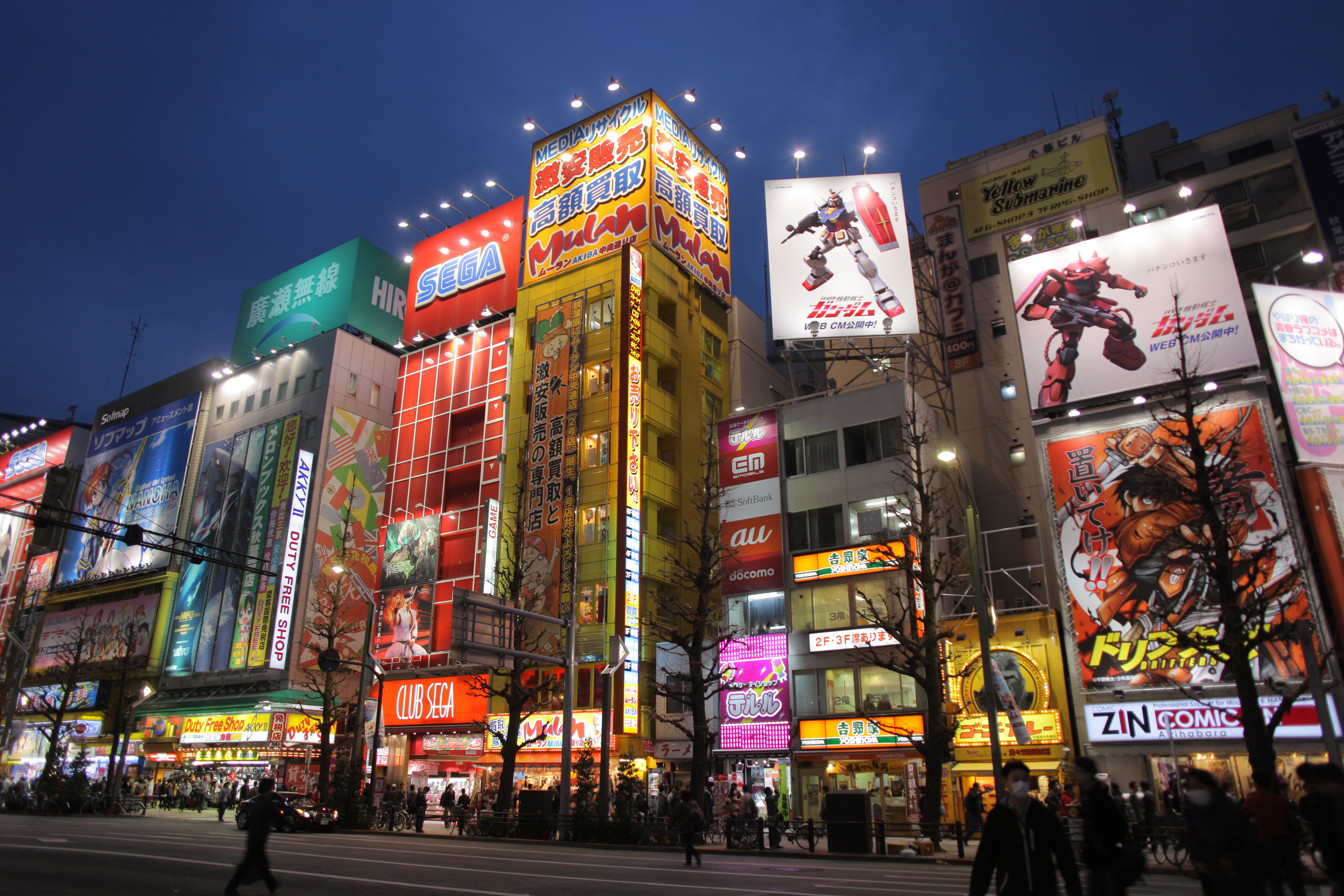
The Akihabara district of Tokyo is popular with anime and manga fans, as well as with the otaku subculture in Japan.

The animation industry consists of more than 430 production companies, with some of the major and most prominent studios including Toei Animation, Madhouse, Gonzo, Sunrise, Bones, TMS Entertainment, Nippon Animation, P.A. Works, Studio Pierrot, Production I.G, Ufotable and Studio Ghibli. Many of the studios are organized into a trade association, The Association of Japanese Animations. There is also a labor union for workers in the industry, the Japanese Animation Creators Association. Studios will often work together to produce more complex and costly projects, as done with Studio Ghibli's Spirited Away. An anime episode can cost between US$100,000 and US$300,000 to produce. In 2001, animation accounted for 7% of the Japanese film market, above the 4.6% market share for live action works. The popularity and success of anime is seen through the profitability of the DVD market, contributing nearly 70% of total sales. According to a 2016 article on Nikkei Asian Review, Japanese television stations have bought over ¥60 billion worth of anime from production companies "over the past few years", compared with under ¥20 billion from overseas. There has been a rise in sales of shows to television stations in Japan, caused by late night anime with adults as the target demographic. This type of anime is less popular outside Japan, being considered "more of a niche product". Spirited Away (2001) was the all-time highest-grossing film in Japan until it was overtaken by Demon Slayer: Kimetsu no Yaiba – The Movie: Mugen Train in 2020. It was also the highest-grossing anime film worldwide until it was overtaken by Makoto Shinkai's 2016 film Your Name. Anime films represent a large part of the highest-grossing Japanese films yearly in Japan, with 6 out of the top 10 in 2014, 2015 and 2016.

Anime has to be licensed by companies in other countries in order to be legally released. While anime has been licensed by its Japanese owners release outside Japan since at least the 1960s, the practice became well-established in the United States in the late 1970s to early 1980s, when such TV series as Gatchaman and Captain Harlock were licensed from their Japanese parent companies for distribution in the American market. The trend towards American distribution of anime continued into the 1980s with the licensing of titles such as Voltron and the "creation" of new series such as Robotech through the use of source material from several original series.

In the early 1990s, several companies began to experiment with the licensing of less child-oriented material. Some, such as A.D. Vision, and Central Park Media and its imprints, achieved fairly substantial commercial success and went on to become major players in the now very lucrative American anime market. Others, such as AnimEigo, achieved limited success. Many companies created directly by Japanese parent companies did not do as well, most releasing only one or two titles before completing their American operations.

Licenses are expensive, often costing hundreds of thousands of dollars for one series and tens of thousands for one movie. Prices can vary widely; for example, Jinki: Extend costed only $91,000 to license while Kurau Phantom Memory costed $960,000. Simulcast Internet streaming rights can be cheaper, with prices around $1,000–2,000 an episode, but can also be more expensive, with some series costing more than US$200,000 per episode.

The anime market for the United States was worth approximately $2.74 billion in 2009. Dubbed anime began airing in the United States in 2000 on networks like The WB and Cartoon Network's Adult Swim. In 2005, this resulted in five of the top ten anime titles having previously aired on Cartoon Network. As a part of localization, some editing of cultural references may occur to better follow the references of the non-Japanese culture. The cost of English localization averages US$10,000 per episode.

The industry has been subject to both praise and condemnation for fansubs, the addition of unlicensed and unauthorized subtitled translations of anime series or films. Fansubs, which were originally distributed on bootlegged VHS cassettes in the 1980s, have been freely available and disseminated online since the 1990s. Since this practice raises concerns for copyright and piracy issues, fansubbers tend to adhere to an unwritten moral code to destroy or no longer distribute an anime once an officially translated or subtitled version becomes licensed. They also try to encourage viewers to buy an official copy of the release once it comes out in English, although fansubs typically continue to circulate through file-sharing networks. Even so, the laid back regulations of the Japanese animation industry tend to overlook these issues, allowing it to grow underground and thus increasing its popularity until there is a demand for official high-quality releases for animation companies. This has led to an increase in global popularity of Japanese animation, reaching $40 million in sales in 2004. Fansub practices have rapidly declined since the early-2010s due to the advent of legal streaming services which simulcast new anime series, often within a few hours of their domestic release.

Starting in the 2010s, anime has become a global multibillion-dollar industry, setting a sales record in 2017 of ¥2.15 trillion ($19.8 billion), driven largely by demand from overseas audiences. In 2019, Japan's anime industry was valued at $24 billion a year, with 48% of that revenue coming from overseas (which is now its largest industry sector). The anime industry was projected to reach a value of $30 billion by 2025, with over 60% of that revenue coming from overseas.

=== Markets ===
The Japan External Trade Organization (JETRO) valued the domestic anime market in Japan at ¥2.4 trillion ($24 billion), including ¥2 trillion from licensed products, in 2005. JETRO reported sales of overseas anime exports in 2004 to be ¥2 trillion ($18 billion). JETRO valued the anime market in the United States at ¥520 billion ($5.2 billion), including $500 million in home video sales and over $4 billion from licensed products, in 2005. JETRO projected in 2005 that the worldwide anime market, including sales of licensed products, would grow to ¥10 trillion ($100 billion). The anime market in China was valued at $21 billion in 2017, and was projected to reach $31 billion by 2020. In Europe, the anime merchandising market was valued at about $950 million as of 2022, with the figurine segment accounting for most of the share; it is expected to reach a value of over $2 billion by 2030. The global anime market size was valued at $26.055 billion in 2021 with 29% of the revenue coming from merchandise. It is expected that the global anime market will reach a value of $47.14 billion by 2028. In 2023, the anime industry generated $19.8 billion in total global revenue, including $5.5 billion from streaming and $14.3 billion from merchandise sales. North America and Asia contributed a combined $14.3 billion in total revenue, accounting for over 72% of anime's global impact. By 2030, the global anime market is expected to reach a value of $48.3 billion, with the largest contributors to this growth being North America, Europe, Asia–Pacific and the Middle East. The global anime market size was valued at $25.8 billion in 2022 and is expected to increase to $62.7 billion by 2032, with a CAGR of 9.4%. In 2019, the annual overseas exports of Japanese animation exceeded $10 billion for the first time in history. According to Dentsu's 2025 Global Research Report "Anime: A Growing Opportunity for Brands", data collected between October 2024 and March 2025 from 8,600 consumers across 10 countries (the United States, United Kingdom, Poland, Spain, France, Italy, Japan, China, Indonesia, and Thailand) showed that the anime fandom is continuing to expand markedly worldwide. Globally, 3 in 10 consumers reported watching anime weekly, with that proportion rising to 50% among Gen Z viewers. In Southeast Asia in particular, enthusiasm is strong: in Thailand, nearly one-third (31%) of anime viewers spent over US$200 on merchandise in the past year, while in Indonesia, the figure is about 23%. Moreover, in Indonesia, about 1 in 5 Gen Z anime fans say they post about anime on social platforms or are part of anime-related Discord communities, indicating high active engagement rather than passive consumption. In the EMEA markets surveyed (UK, France, Spain, Italy, Poland), around 20% in France and 19% in Italy of respondents report watching anime weekly. In the United States, the global survey found that 40% of anime consumers reported spending more than US$200 on related merchandise over the past year. Netflix was identified as the most widely used platform for anime viewing in the United States, Europe and Asia–Pacific.

=== Awards ===
The anime industry hosts several annual awards that honor the year's best works. Major annual awards in Japan include the Ōfuji Noburō Award, the Mainichi Film Award for Best Animation Film, the Animation Kobe Awards, the Japan Media Arts Festival animation awards, the Seiyu Awards for voice actors, the Tokyo Anime Award, and the Japan Academy Prize for Animation of the Year. Internationally, anime TV series and films compete in shows such as the Crunchyroll Anime Awards and The Astra Awards. There were also the American Anime Awards, which were designed to recognize excellence in anime titles nominated by the industry, though it was held only once in 2006. Anime productions have also been nominated and won awards not exclusively for anime, like the Academy Award for Best Animated Feature or the Golden Bear.

=== Working conditions ===
In recent years, the anime industry has been accused by both Japanese and foreign media of overworking and underpaying its animators. In response, Japanese Prime Minister Fumio Kishida promised to improve the working conditions and salary of all animators and creators working in the industry. A few anime studios such as MAPPA have taken actions to improve the working conditions of their employees. There was a slight increase in production costs and animator salaries during the COVID-19 pandemic. In 2020 and 2021, Netflix expanded its investment in the anime industry and began funding training initiatives for aspiring animators. On April 27, 2023, the Nippon Anime Film Culture Association (NAFCA) was officially founded. The association aims to address and solve problems in the industry, including the improvement of working conditions for animators. The Japanese government is actively working to improve the working conditions within the anime industry as part of its broader initiative to support and further expand the sector in order to sustain its growing global demand.

== Global popularity and cultural impact ==
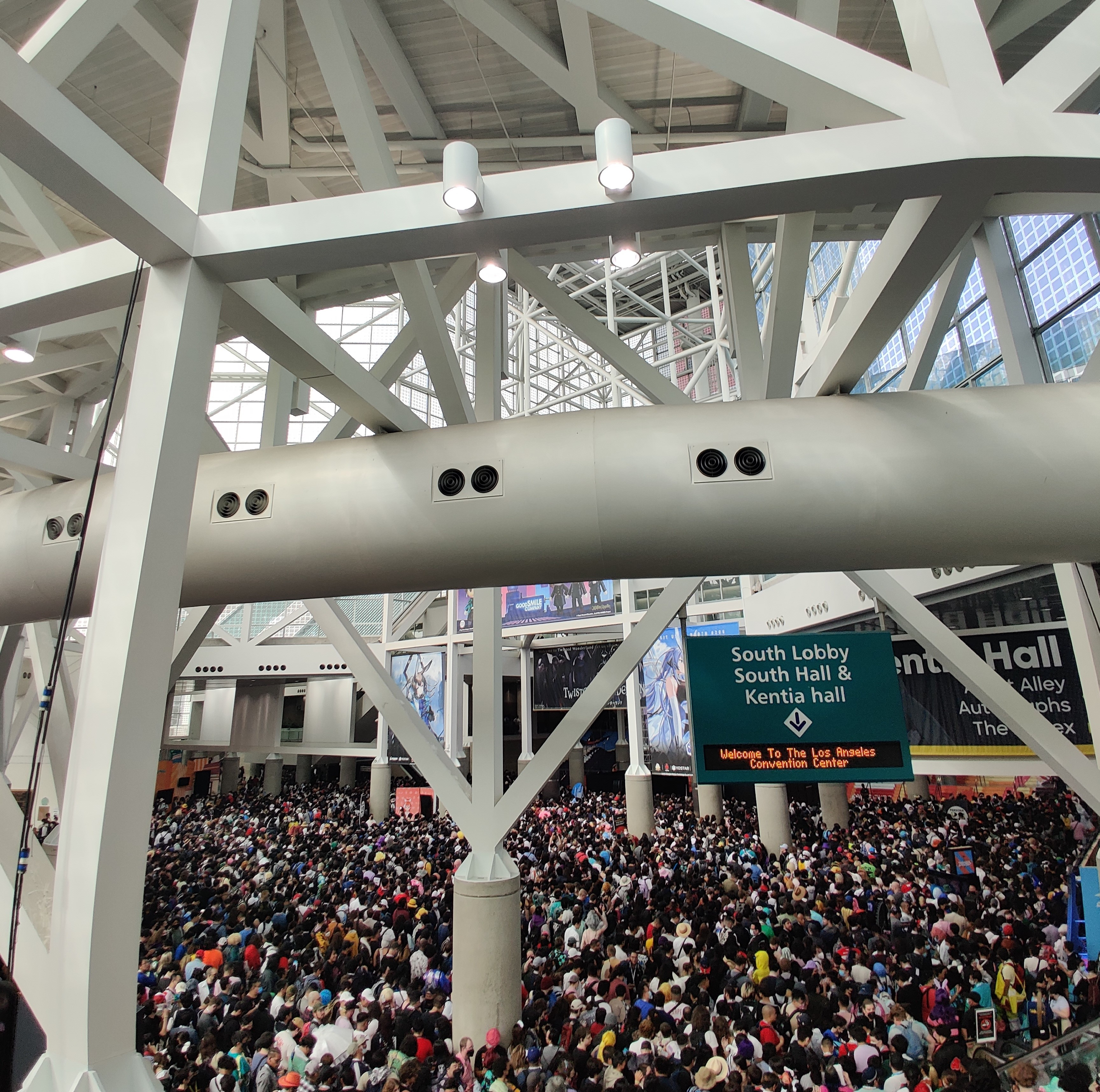
Anime Expo in Los Angeles, California, United States – one of the largest fan conventions in the Western world.

Anime has become immensely commercially profitable in much of the Western world, as demonstrated by early commercially successful Western adaptations of anime, such as Astro Boy and Speed Racer. Early American adaptations in the 1960s led Japan to expand into the continental European market, first with productions aimed at European and Japanese children, such as Heidi, Vicky the Viking and Barbapapa, which aired in various countries. Italy, Spain, and France developed a particular interest in Japan's output, due to its cheap selling price and productive output. As of 2014, Italy imported the most anime outside Japan. Anime and manga were introduced to France in the late 1970s and became massively popular in spite of a moral panic led by French politicians in the 1980s and 1990s. These mass imports influenced anime's popularity in East Asian, Southeast Asian, South Asian, Latin American, Arabic, Israeli and German markets.

The beginning of 1980 saw the introduction of Japanese anime series into the American market. In the 1990s, Japanese animation slowly gained popularity in the United States, as media companies such as Viz and Mixx began publishing and releasing animated works into the American market. The 1988 film Akira is largely credited with popularizing anime in the Western world during the early 1990s, before anime was further popularized by television shows such as Pokémon and Dragon Ball Z in the latter part of the decade. By 1997, Japanese anime was the fastest-growing medium in the American video industry. The growth of the Internet later provided international audiences with an easy way to access Japanese content. Early on, online piracy played a major role in this, though over time legal alternatives appeared, which significantly reduced illegal practices. Since the 2010s, streaming services have become increasingly involved in the production, licensing and distribution of anime for international markets. This is especially the case with net services such as Netflix, Crunchyroll and others which have large catalogs in many countries, although until 2020, anime fans in multiple developing countries had fewer options for obtaining access to legal content, and therefore would still turn to online piracy. However, beginning in the 2020s, anime has been experiencing yet another boom in global popularity and demand due to the COVID-19 pandemic and streaming services like Netflix, Amazon Prime Video, HBO Max, Disney+, Hulu and anime-only services like Crunchyroll and Hidive, increasing the international availability of the amount of newly licensed anime shows, as well as the size of their catalogs. Netflix reported that between October 2019 and September 2020, more than 100 million member households worldwide had watched at least one anime title on the platform. Anime titles appeared on the streaming platform's top-ten lists in almost 100 countries within the one-year period. By 2025, Netflix reported that more than 150 million member households, representing an estimated 300 million viewers, commonly watched anime on the platform.

"Anime is no longer niche. It's mainstream."

— Netflix Inc.

As of 2021, anime series are the most demanded foreign-language television shows in the United States, accounting for 30.5% of the market share. (In comparison, Spanish-language and Korean-language shows account for 21% and 11% of the market share, respectively.) In 2021, more than half of Netflix's global members watched anime. In 2022, the anime series Attack on Titan won the award for "Most In-Demand TV Series in the World 2021" in the Global TV Demand Awards. Attack on Titan became the first ever non-English language series to earn the title of "World's Most In-Demand TV Show", previously held by only The Walking Dead and Game of Thrones. In 2024, the anime series Jujutsu Kaisen won the award of "Most In-Demand TV Series in the World 2023" in the Global TV Demand Awards.

Rising interest in anime as well as Japanese video games has led to an increase of university students in the United Kingdom aspiring to get a degree in the Japanese language. The word anime, alongside other Japanese pop cultural terms like shonen, shojo and isekai, have been added to the Oxford English Dictionary.

Various anime and manga series have influenced Hollywood in the making of numerous popular films and characters. Western studios have produced live action adaptations of various anime series such as Ghost in the Shell, Death Note, Dragon Ball and Cowboy Bebop. However most of these adaptations have been received negatively by both critics and audiences and became box-office bombs. The primary reasons for the unsuccessfulness of Hollywood's adaptions of anime are due to change of plot and characters from the original source material and the limited capabilities a live action movie or series has in comparison to an animated counterpart. One of the few particular exceptions to this trend is Alita: Battle Angel, which became a moderate commercial success and received generally positive reviews from both critics and audiences for its visual effects and faithfulness to the source material. The movie grossed $404 million worldwide, making it director Robert Rodriguez's highest-grossing film.

Anime has significantly influenced fashion by blending bold visual storytelling with distinctive character aesthetics, inspiring everything from streetwear and cosplay culture to high-fashion collaborations.

Anime and manga, alongside many other imports of Japanese pop culture, have helped build a positive worldwide image toward Japan and improve its relations with other countries. In 2015, during remarks welcoming Japanese Prime Minister Shinzo Abe to the White House, President Barack Obama thanked Japan for its cultural contributions to the United States by saying:

This visit is a celebration of the ties of friendship and family that bind our peoples. I first felt it when I was 6 years old when my mother took me to Japan. I felt it growing up in Hawaii, like communities across our country, home to so many proud Japanese Americans... Today is also a chance for Americans, especially our young people, to say thank you for all the things we love from Japan. Like karate and karaoke. Manga and anime. And, of course, emojis.

In July 2020, after the approval of a Chilean government project in which citizens of Chile would be allowed to withdraw up to 10% of their privately held retirement savings, journalist Pamela Jiles celebrated by running through Congress with her arms spread out behind her, imitating the move of many characters of the manga and anime series Naruto. In April 2021, Peruvian politicians Jorge Hugo Romero of the PPC and Milagros Juárez of the UPP cosplayed as anime characters to win the otaku vote. On October 28, 2024, the Vatican unveiled its own anime-styled mascot, "Luce", in order to connect with Catholic youth through pop culture.

In April 2023, the Japan Business Federation laid out a proposal aiming to spur the economic growth of Japan by further promoting the contents industry abroad, primarily anime, manga and video games, for measures to invite industry experts from abroad to come to Japan to work, and to link with the tourism sector to help foreign fans of manga and anime visit sites across the country associated with particular manga stories. The federation seeks on quadrupling the sales of Japanese content in overseas markets within the upcoming 10 years.

A 2018 survey conducted in 20 countries and territories using a sample consisting of 6,600 respondents held by Dentsu revealed that 34% of all surveyed people found excellency in anime and manga more than other Japanese cultural or technological aspects, which makes it the third most-liked "Japanese thing", below Japanese cuisine (34.6%) and Japanese robotics (35.1%). The advertisement company views anime as a profitable tool for marketing campaigns in foreign countries due to its popularity and reception.

Anime plays a role in driving tourism to Japan. In surveys held by Statista between 2019 and 2020, 24.2% of tourists from the United States, 7.7% of tourists from China and 6.1% of tourists from South Korea said they were motivated to visit Japan because of Japanese popular culture. In a 2021 survey held by Crunchyroll market research, 94% of Gen Z and 73% of the general population said that they were familiar with anime.

As of 2023, Japan's overseas exports of cultural content recorded 5,776.9 billion yen.

=== Fan response ===
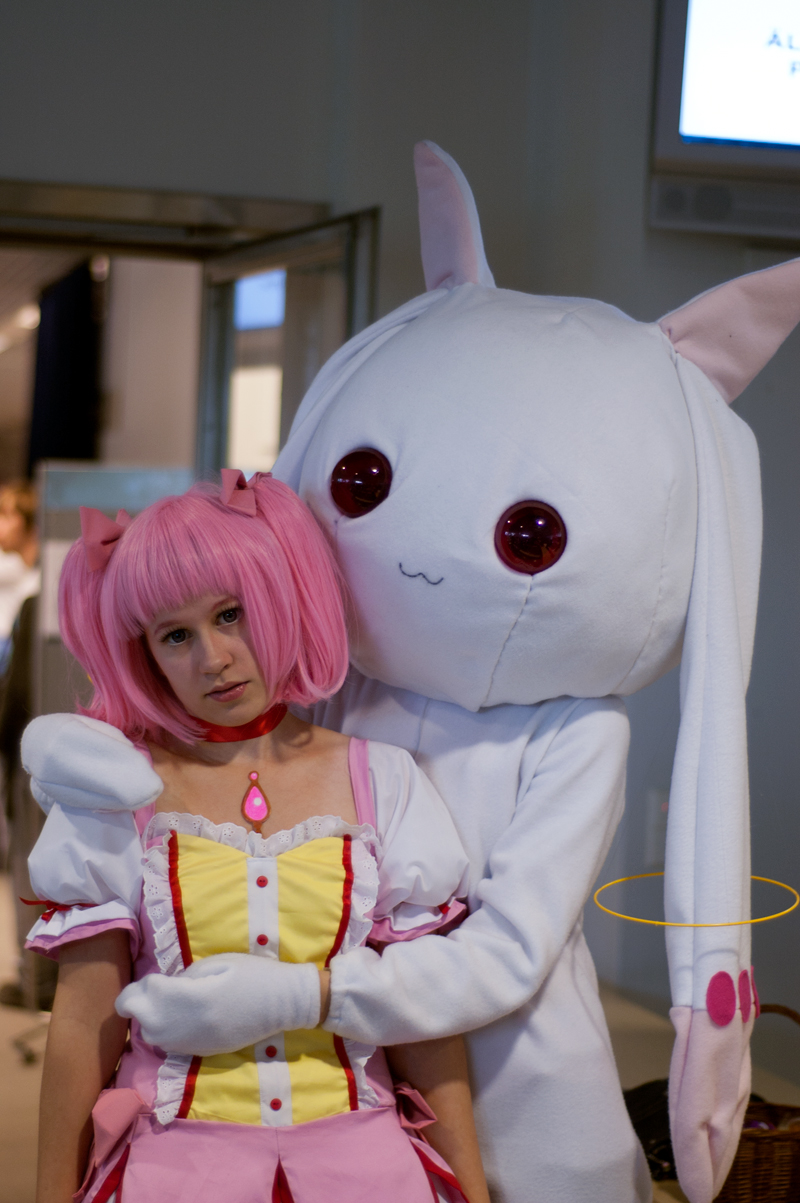
Cosplay of Madoka Kaname and Kyubey from Puella Magi Madoka Magica during the Tracon 2013 event at the Tampere Hall in Tampere, Finland

Anime clubs gave rise to anime conventions in the 1990s with the "anime boom", a period marked by anime's increased global popularity. These conventions dedicated to anime and manga include elements like cosplay contests and industry talk panels. Cosplay, a portmanteau of "costume play", is not unique to anime and has become popular in contests and masquerades at anime conventions. Japanese culture and words have entered English usage through the popularity of the medium, including otaku, an unflattering Japanese term commonly used in English to denote an obsessive fan of anime or manga. Another word that has arisen describing obsessive fans in the United States is wapanese, referring to white individuals who want to be Japanese, or later known as weeaboo or weeb, individuals who demonstrate an obsession with Japanese anime, a term that originated from abusive content posted on the website 4chan.org. While originally derogatory, the terms "otaku" and "weeb" have been reappropriated by the anime fandom overtime and today are used by some fans to refer to themselves in a comedic and more positive way. Anime enthusiasts have produced fan fiction and fan art, including computer wallpapers, and anime music videos (AMVs). Many fans visit sites depicted in anime, games, manga and other forms of otaku culture. This behavior is known as an "anime pilgrimage".

By the 2020s, anime had firmly established itself as a major global cultural force, resonating with audiences far beyond its origins in Japan. According to a 2025 Crunchyroll research study in seven markets (United States, United Kingdom, India, Germany, France, Brazil and Mexico) over half of Generation Z worldwide identified as anime fans, reflecting the medium's widespread appeal across cultures and languages. The growing international enthusiasm for anime has been attributed to its emotional depth, distinctive visual style, and ability to explore universal themes such as identity, friendship, and perseverance. Its influence can be seen in global entertainment, fashion, and online communities, demonstrating how anime has evolved from a regional art form into a defining element of modern pop culture.

As of the 2020s, many anime fans and followers use social media platforms and other sites like YouTube, Bilibili, Twitch, Fandom, Facebook, Instagram, Reddit, Discord, Tumblr, 4chan, TikTok and Twitter, with online communities and databases such as IMDb and MyAnimeList used to discuss anime, manga, and track progress watching respective series, as well as with news outlets such as Anime News Network.

According to Crunchyroll's research data from 2023 to 2024 provided by its President Rahul Parini, there are approximately 800 million people globally (outside of China and Japan) who are either highly aware of anime, show interest in anime, or currently watch anime and identify as fans. According to a 2024 survey conducted on anime fans by Polygon, 65% of the surveyed anime fans said that they find anime more emotionally compelling than other forms of media and more than 3 in 4 of millennial and Gen Z fans use the medium as a form of escapism. Almost two-thirds of the anime-watching Gen Z audience said they emotionally connect better with anime than they do with traditional media. Over 50% of surveyed Gen Z anime fans said that anime influences their identity, fashion and social understanding.

Due to anime's increased popularity in the 21st century, a large number of celebrities such as Elon Musk, BTS, Ariana Grande, Billie Eilish, and Michael B. Jordan have stated that they are anime fans.

=== Anime style ===
One of the key points that differentiated anime from many Western cartoons was the prominence of darker and more explicit content. Once the expectation that the aspects of visual intrigue or animation are just for children is put aside, the audience can realize that themes involving violence, suffering, sexuality, pain, and death can all be storytelling elements utilized in anime just as much as other media.

"Japanese animation is so different from what airs here. It's far edgier, more adult and violent."

— Mike Lazzo of Cartoon Network

However, as anime itself became increasingly popular, its styling has been inevitably the subject of both satire and serious creative productions. South Park's "Chinpokomon" and "Good Times with Weapons" episodes, Adult Swim's Perfect Hair Forever, and Nickelodeon's Kappa Mikey are examples of Western satirical depictions of Japanese culture and anime, but anime tropes have also been satirized by some anime such as KonoSuba.

Traditionally only Japanese works have been considered anime, but some works have sparked debate about blurring the lines between anime and cartoons, such as the American anime-style productions Avatar: The Last Airbender and The Legend of Korra. These anime-styled works have become defined as anime-influenced animation, in an attempt to classify all anime styled works of non-Japanese origin. Some creators of these works cite anime as a source of inspiration; for example the French production team for Ōban Star-Racers moved to Tokyo to collaborate with a Japanese production team. When anime is defined as a "style" rather than as a national product, it leaves open the possibility of anime being produced in other countries, but this has been contentious amongst fans, with John Oppliger stating, "The insistence on referring to original American art as Japanese "anime" or "manga" robs the work of its cultural identity."

While some anime will depict non-Japanese characters with specific ethnic features, such as a pronounced nose and jutting jaw for European characters, there are some styles that deliberately forgo any identification of its characters with real-world ethnicities or nationalities, termed in criticism as mukokuseki (statelessness). Mukokuseki characters can significantly impact the reception of a property outside of Japan.

A U.A.E.-Filipino produced TV series called Torkaizer is dubbed as the "Middle East's First Anime Show", and is currently in production and looking for funding. Netflix has produced multiple anime series in collaboration with Japanese animation studios, and in doing so, has offered a more accessible channel for distribution to Western markets. Similar initiatives have been enacted by the US-based streaming service Crunchyroll, producing titles such as High Guardian Spice and an adaptation of Tower of God.

The web-based series RWBY, produced by Texas-based company Rooster Teeth, was produced using an anime art style, and the series has been described as "anime" by multiple sources. For example, Adweek, in the headline to one of its articles, described the series as "American-made anime", and in another headline, The Huffington Post described it as simply "anime", without referencing its country of origin. In 2013, Monty Oum, the creator of RWBY, said "Some believe just like Scotch needs to be made in Scotland, an American company can't make anime. I think that's a narrow way of seeing it. Anime is an art form, and to say only one country can make this art is wrong." RWBY has been released in Japan with a Japanese dub; the CEO of Rooster Teeth, Matt Hullum, commented "This is the first time any American-made anime has been marketed to Japan. It definitely usually works the other way around, and we're really pleased about that."

=== Media franchises ===
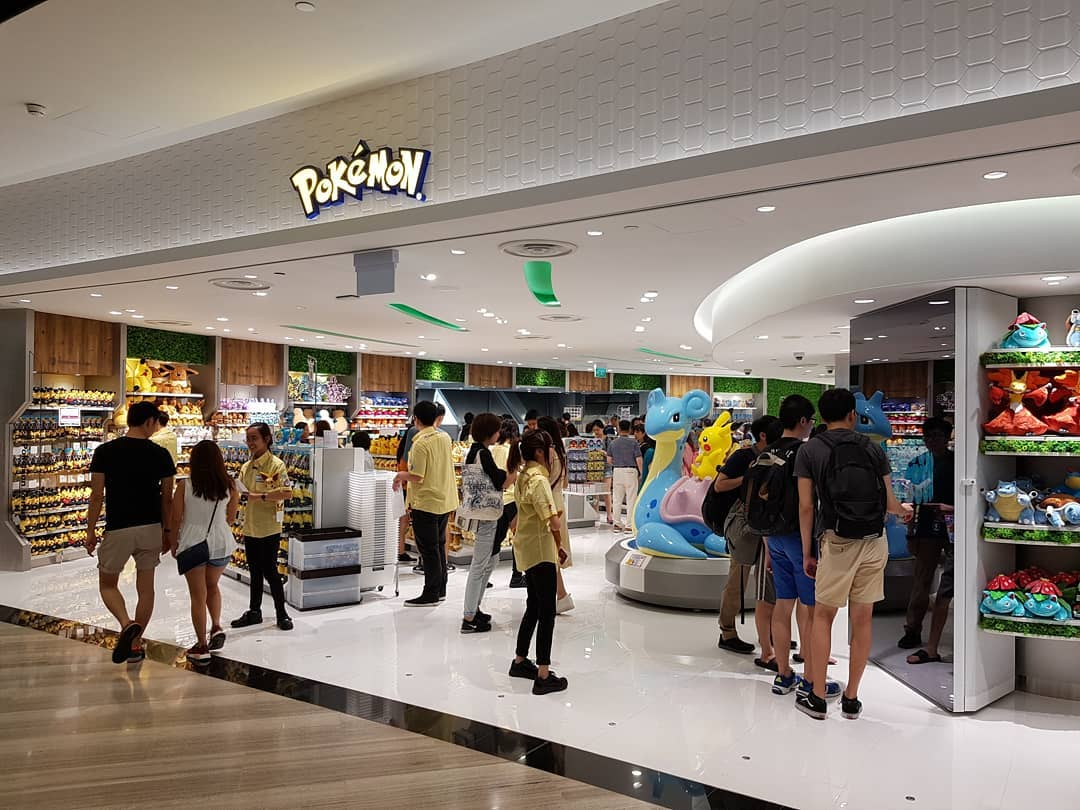
Pokémon Center at Jewel Changi Airport in Singapore

In Japanese culture and entertainment, the term media mix refers to a strategy to disperse content across multiple representations: different broadcast media, gaming platforms, cell phones, toys, amusement parks, and other methods. It is the Japanese term for a transmedia franchise. The term gained notability in the late 1980s, but the origins of the strategy can be traced back to the 1960s with the proliferation of anime, with its interconnection of media and commodity goods.

A number of anime and manga media franchises such as Demon Slayer: Kimetsu no Yaiba, Dragon Ball, Fate/stay night, Yu-Gi-Oh!, Neon Genesis Evangelion and Gundam have gained immense global popularity, and are among the world's highest-grossing media franchises. Pokémon in particular is the highest-grossing media franchise of all time.

== See also ==
- Cool Japan – 20th–21st century Japanese soft power strategy
- Hentai – Anime and manga pornography
- History of anime
- Japanese popular culture
- Japanophilia – Affinity for Japanese culture
- La nouvelle manga – French and Japanese artistic movement
- Lists of anime
- Manfra – French comics that draw inspiration from Japanese manga
- Mechademia – Peer-reviewed academic journal
- OEL manga – Type of comic book or graphic novel in English
- Otaku – Someone highly interested in anime and manga
- Soft power – Ability to co-opt rather than coerce
  - Soft power § Japan
- Television in Japan
- Video games in Japan – Japan's video game industry
- Voice acting in Japan – Industry and occupation
- Vtuber – Streamers that use virtual avatars
