= Kenzō Masaoka =

Japanese early anime creator and seiyū

Kenzo Masaoka
- Born: October 5, 1898; Osaka, Japan
- Died: November 23, 1988 (aged 90); Tokyo, Japan
- Other name: Donbei Masaoka
- Occupation: Animator

Kenzō Masaoka (政岡 憲三, Masaoka Kenzō; October 5, 1898 – November 23, 1988) was a Japanese animator and voice actor.

Masaoka was the first to use cel animation and recorded sound in anime. He worked at a number of companies as an animator and actor, and was one of the founders of what became Toei Animation. His work as a special effects artist earned him the title "Japanese Méliès."

He also did work under the pseudonym Donbei Masaoka (正岡 どんべい, Masaoka Donbei).

Famous animators who worked under him include Mitsuyo Seo and Yasuji Mori.

== Biography ==
Masaoka was born in Osaka in 1898 and initially trained in Japanese-style painting at Kyoto City University of Arts before an ambition to paint in oils took him to Tokyo; he soon returned to Kyoto, however, and found work as a costume designer on Shōzō Makino's film Sun (日輪). His own venture came in 1927 with the founding of Nonbei Production in the Shimogamo district of Kyoto, where he produced the children's film Shell Palace (貝の宮殿) and occasionally performed on screen under the stage name Rurinosuke Segawa. A longstanding curiosity about animation led him to Nikkatsu's Uzumasa Studio in 1929; the well-received Nonsense Story, Vol. 1: The Monkey Island (難船ス物語第壱篇 猿ヶ島), released in 1931, was his first work in the medium.

Masaoka struck out on his own again in 1932, founding Masaoka Eiga Seisakusho in Kyoto, where a commission from Shochiku's Kamata studio head Shirō Kido resulted in The World of Power and Women (力と女の世の中, 1933), Japan's first talkie animation. Renamed Masaoka Eiga Bijutsu Kenkyusho that December and rehoused in a purpose-built two-story facility with its own recording studio, the operation pursued higher production values through the then-costly technique of cel animation, but its finances could not sustain the ambition and the studio eventually closed.

He resurfaced at Shochiku Doga Kenkyusho in 1941, where he made the film for which he remains best known, The Spider and the Tulip (くもとちゅうりっぷ, 1943). Following World War II, Masaoka teamed up with Sanae Yamamoto at Shin Nihon Dogasha (later Nihon Mangaeiga Corp.), though he departed after only a single, unreleased production, Sakura (桜, 1946); the two then launched Nihon Doga Corp.—the forerunner of Nichido and eventually Toei Animation—whose Tora-chan series (すて猫トラちゃん, 1947–1950) could not overcome the company's recurring money troubles, and Masaoka gradually turned his attention to cartooning and picture books instead.

== Filmography ==
Year	English name	Japanese name	Romaji	Source
1927	Sea Palace	貝の宮殿	Kai no kyūden	
1927	Shell Palace	海の宮殿	Umi no kyūden	
1930	Nonsense Story, Volume 1: Monkey Island	難船ス物語 第壱篇 猿ヶ嶋	Nansensu Monogatari Daīppen Sarugashima	
1931	Shipwreck Story - Second Chapter - The Pirate Ship	難船ス物語 第二篇 海賊船	Nansensu Monogatari - Daini-hen - Kaizokusen	
1931	Bakahachi and the Castle Lord(?)	馬鹿八と城主様	Bakahachi to jōshu-sama	
1933	The World of Power and Women	力と女の世の中	Chikara to Onna no Yo no Naka	
1934	Three Crows	三羽烏	Sanba garasu	
1934	The Gang and the Dancer	ギャングと踊り子	Gyangu to Odoriko	
1934	Vengeful Crow	-	Adauchi Karasu	
1934	The Dance of the Chagamas; The Teakettle Marching Song	茶釜音頭	Chagama ondo	
1935	Fairy Forest	森の妖精	Mori no yōsei	
1935	Ta-chan's Underwater Adventure	ターチャンの海底旅行	Tāchan no kaitei ryoko	
1935	Ta-chan's Monster Adventure	ターチャンの怪物退治	Tāchan no kaibutsu taiji	
1935	Princess Kaguya	かぐや姫	Kaguya Hime	
1936	The Sparrows' Lodge	雀のお宿	Suzume no Oyado	
1938	-	やっこのタコ平	Yakko no Takohei: Otomo wa tsuyoi ne	
1939	Monkey and Crabs	マングワ 新猿蟹合戰	Shin Saru Kani Gassen	
1939	Cat's Folktale	ニャンの浦島	Nyan no urashima	
1939	Benkei and Ushiwaka	弁慶対牛若	Benkei tai Ushiwaka	
1940	Magician In The Dream	夢の魔術師	Yume no Majutsushi	
1941	Attack on Fuku-chan	フクちゃんの奇襲	Fuku-chan no kishū	
1943	Spider and Tulip	くもとちゅうりっぷ	Kumo to chūrippu	
1946	Cherry Blossom: Spring's Fantasy	桜 - 春の幻想	Sakura: Haru no genso	
1947	Abandoned Cat Little Tora	すて猫トラちゃん	Sute Neko Tora-chan	
1948	Tora-chan and the Bride	トラちゃんと花嫁	Tora-chan to Hanayome	
1950	Tora-chan and the Insect	トラちゃんのカンカン虫	Tora-chan no Kankan Mushi	
