= Benkei tai Ushiwaka =

1939 film by Kenzō Masaoka

べんけい対ウシワカ
- Anime
- Directed by: Kenzō Masaoka
- Released: 1939

Benkei tai Ushiwaka (べんけい対ウシワカ; trans. Benkei and Ushiwaka) is a 1939 Japanese short anime film made by Kenzō Masaoka. Masaoka was known for helping introduce sound and cel animation to anime, and here he tried the American practice of animating after recording some of the sound (instead of dubbing after the animation was finished). Masaoka did the voice of Benkei, and his wife Ushiwaka.

It is based on the legendary encounter between Saitō Musashibō Benkei, who was collecting swords for the Buddha, and Minamoto no Yoshitsune, who was called Ushiwaka in his youth. After training under the tengu of Mt. Kurama, Ushiwaka foils Benkei's attempt to take his sword in a battle on Gojo Bridge in Kyoto and makes Benkei his vassal.
