= History of animation =

Animation, the method for creating moving pictures from still images, has an early history and a modern history that began with the advent of celluloid film in 1888. Between 1895 and 1920, during the rise of the cinematic industry, several different animation techniques were developed or re-invented, including stop-motion with objects, puppets, clay or cutouts, and drawn or painted animation. Hand-drawn animation, which mostly consisted of a succession of still images painted on cels, was the dominant technique of the 20th century and became known as traditional animation.

Today, computer animation is the dominant animation technique in most regions, although traditional animation, like Japanese anime and European hand-drawn productions, remains popular outside of the United States. Computer animation is mostly associated with a three-dimensional appearance with detailed shading and detailed highlights, although many different animation styles have been generated or simulated with computers. Some productions may be recognized as Flash animations, but in practice, computer animation with a relatively two-dimensional appearance, stark outlines and little shading, will generally be considered "traditional animation" even if it is created on a computer. The first feature movie made on computers, without a camera, is The Rescuers Down Under (1990), but its style can hardly be distinguished from cel animation.

== Influence of predecessors ==
Animated movies are part of ancient traditions in storytelling, the visual arts and theatre. Popular techniques with moving images before film include shadow play, mechanical slides, and mobile projectors in magic lantern shows (especially phantasmagoria). Techniques with fanciful three-dimensional moving figures include masks and costumes, puppetry and automata.

The principle of modern animation is based on the stroboscopic illusion of motion that was introduced in 1833 with stroboscopic discs (better known as the phenakistiscope). These animated discs had an average of 8 to 16 images that were usually designed as endless loops, for home use as a hand-operated "philosophical toy". Although several pioneers hoped it could be applied to longer scenes for theatrical use, further development of the technique throughout the 19th century mostly concentrated on combinations with the stereoscope (introduced in 1838) and photography (introduced in 1839). The breakthrough of cinematography partly depended on the novelty of a technique that was able to record and reproduce life-like motion pictures. During the first years, drawing animated pictures seemed an archaic technique in comparison, until some artists produced popular and influential animated shorts and producers embraced cheap techniques to turn popular comic strips into animated cartoons.

== 1888–1909: Earliest animations on film ==
Pauvre Pierrot (1892)

=== Théâtre Optique ===
Charles-Émile Reynaud developed his projection praxinoscope into the Théâtre Optique with transparent hand-painted colorful pictures on a long perforated strip wound between two spools, which he patented in December 1888. From 28 October 1892 to March 1900, Reynaud gave over 12,800 shows to over 500,000 visitors at the Musée Grévin in Paris. His Pantomimes Lumineuses series of animated films each contained 300 to 700 frames manipulated back and forth to last 10 to 15 minutes per film. A background scene was projected separately. Piano music, song and some dialogue were performed live, while some sound effects were synchronized with an electromagnet. The first program included three cartoons: Pauvre Pierrot (created in 1892), Un bon bock (created in 1892, now lost), and Le Clown et ses chiens (created in 1892, now lost). Later, the titles Autour d'une cabine (created in 1894) and A rêve au coin du feu (created in 1894) would be part of the performances.

=== Standard picture film ===
Despite the success of Reynaud's films, it took some time before animation was adapted in the film industry that came about after the introduction of Lumiere's Cinematograph in 1895. Georges Méliès' early fantasy films and trick films (released between 1896 and 1913) occasionally contain elements that somewhat resemble animation, including painted props or painted creatures that were moved in front of painted backgrounds (mostly using wires), and film colorization by hand. Méliès also popularized the stop trick, with a single change made to the scene in between shots, that had already been used in Thomas Edison's The Execution of Mary Stuart in 1895 and probably led to the development of stop-motion animation some years later. It was not until 1906 that proper animated films appeared in cinemas. The dating of some presumed earlier films with animation is contested, while other early films that might have used stop motion or other animation techniques are lost or unidentified.

==== Printed animation film ====
Katsudō Shashin (1907)

By 1897, German toy manufacturer Gebrüder Bing had a first prototype of their toy kinematograph, which they presented at a toy convention in Leipzig in November 1898. Soon after, other toy manufacturers in Germany and France, including Ernst Plank, Georges Carette, and Lapierre, started selling similar devices. The kinematographs were basically traditional toy magic lanterns, adapted with one or two small spools that used standard "Edison perforation" 35mm film, a crank, and a shutter. These projectors were intended for the same type of "home entertainment" toy market that most of the manufacturers already provided with praxinoscopes and magic lanterns. Apart from relatively expensive live-action films, the manufacturers produced many cheaper films by printing lithographed drawings. These animations were probably made in black-and-white starting in 1898 or 1899, but by 1902 at the latest they were produced in color. The pictures were often traced from live-action films (like the later rotoscoping technique). These very short films typically depicted a simple repetitive action and most were designed to be projected as a loop - playing endlessly with the ends of the film joined. The lithograph process and the loop format follow the tradition that was set by the stroboscopic disc, zoetrope and praxinoscope.

Katsudō Shashin (produced between 1907 and 1912), is speculated to be the oldest work of animation in Japan.

==== J. Stuart Blackton ====
The Enchanted Drawing (1900)

J. Stuart Blackton was a British-American filmmaker, co-founder of the Vitagraph Studios, and one of the first to use animation in his films. His The Enchanted Drawing (1900) can be regarded as the first theatrical film recorded on standard picture film that included animated elements, although this concerns just a few frames of changes in drawings. It shows Blackton doing "lightning sketches" of a face, cigars, a bottle of wine and a glass. The face changes expression when Blackton pours wine into the face's mouth and when Blackton takes his cigar. The technique used in this film was basically the stop trick: the single change to the scenes was the replacement of a drawing by a similar drawing with a different facial expression. In some scenes, a drawn bottle and glass were replaced by real objects. Blackton had possibly used the same technique in a lost 1896 lightning sketch film.

Blackton's 1906 film Humorous Phases of Funny Faces is often regarded as the oldest known hand-drawn animation on standard film. It features a sequence made with blackboard drawings that are changed between frames to show two faces changing expressions and some billowing cigar smoke, as well as two sequences that feature cutout animation with a similar look for more fluid motion.

==== Alexander Shiryaev ====
Alexander Shiryaev was a Russian ballet dancer, ballet master, and choreographer who served at the Mariinsky Theatre who is credited with the independent invention of stop motion animation. From 1906 to 1909, he created the earliest known animated films made in Russia, using puppet animation, hand-drawn animation, and mixed techniques. While some were made as experiments (for example, a 20-minute drawn animation showing the flight of birds in a continuous line), most of his films were made for the educational purpose of showing ballet dancers what their choreography should look like. The puppet animations ranged in length from just over a minute to 10 minutes long. Shiryaev's films were only screened within the Mariinsky Theatre for the performers, not publicly, and were generally unknown until 2003, when Russian documentarist and ballet historian Viktor Bocharov released a one-hour movie titled A Belated Premiere which included fragments of the various films.

==== Segundo de Chomón ====
Spanish filmmaker Segundo de Chomón made many trick films for French film company Pathé. By 1906, he had used stop motion in several short films, including La Maison ensorcelée and Le théâtre de Bob (both released in the US in April 1906). Blackton's The Haunted Hotel (23 February 1907) contains stop motion elements that are very similar to those in La Maison ensorcelée. If the release dates are correct (and if translated titles have not been mixed up), Blackton must have been inspired by De Chomón's work rather than vice versa, but it has been believed that The Haunted Hotel was a big hit in France and other European countries, and would have been the film that inspired local filmmakers, including Émile Cohl, to start working with the innovative animation technique. De Chomon also made the related short film Hôtel électrique (1908), which includes a short scene with pixilation.

==== Émile Cohl ====
Fantasmagorie (1908)

In 1907, the French artist Émile Cohl started his filmmaking career with Japon de faintasie, with imaginative use of stop motion techniques. His next short can be regarded as the first animated film using what would come to be known as traditional animation methods: the 1908 Fantasmagorie. The film largely consists of a stick figure moving about and encountering all manner of morphing objects, such as a wine bottle that transforms into a flower. There are also sections of live action where the animator's hands enters the scene. The film was created by drawing each frame on paper and then shooting each frame onto negative film, which gave the picture a blackboard look. Cohl later went to Fort Lee, New Jersey near New York City in 1912, where he worked for French studio Éclair and spread its animation technique to the US.

== 1910s: From original artists to "assembly-line" production studios ==
During the 1910s larger-scale animation studios come into being and solo artists faded from the public eye. The first known professional female animator, Bessie Mae Kelley, began her career in 1917.

=== Winsor McCay ===
Gertie the Dinosaur (1914)

Starting with a short 1911 film of his most popular character Little Nemo, successful newspaper cartoonist Winsor McCay gave much more detail to his hand-drawn animations than any animation previously seen in cinemas. His 1914 film Gertie the Dinosaur featured an early example of character development in drawn animation. It was also the first film to combine live-action footage with animation. Originally, McCay used the film in his vaudeville act: he would stand next to the screen and speak to Gertie who would respond with a series of gestures. At the end of the film McCay would walk behind the projection screen, seamlessly being replaced with a prerecorded image of himself entering the screen, getting on the cartoon dinosaur's back and riding out of frame. McCay personally hand-drew almost every one of the thousands of drawings for his films. Other noteworthy titles by McCay are How a Mosquito Operates (1912) and The Sinking of the Lusitania (1918).

=== Cartoon Film Company – Buxton and Dyer ===
Between 1915 and 1916 Dudley Buxton and Anson Dyer produced a series of 26 topical cartoons, during WWI, mainly utilising cutout animation, which they released as John Bull's Animated Sketchbook, The episodes included events such as the shelling of Scarborough by German battleships, and the sinking of the RMS Lusitania in episode No.4 in June 1915.

=== Barré Studio ===
Around 1913 Raoul Barré developed the peg system that made it easier to align drawings by perforating two holes below each drawing and placing them on two fixed pins. He also used a "slash and tear" technique to not have to draw the complete background or other motionless parts for every frame. The parts where something needed to be changed for the next frame were carefully cut away from the drawing and filled in with the required change on the sheet below. After Barré had started his career in animation at Edison Studios, he founded one of the first film studios dedicated to animation in 1914 (initially together with Bill Nolan). Barré Studio had success with the production of the adaptation of the popular comic strip Mutt and Jeff (1916–1926). The studio employed several animators who would go on to have notable careers in animation, including Frank Moser, Gregory La Cava, Vernon Stallings, and Pat Sullivan.

=== Bray Productions ===
In 1914, John Bray opened John Bray Studios, which revolutionized the way animation was created. Earl Hurd, one of Bray's employees, patented the cel technique. This involved animating moving objects on transparent celluloid sheets. Animators photographed the sheets over a stationary background image to generate the sequence of images. This, as well as Bray's innovative use of the assembly-line method, allowed John Bray Studios to create Colonel Heeza Liar, the first animated series. Many aspiring cartoonists started their careers at Bray, including Paul Terry (later of Heckle and Jeckle fame), Max Fleischer (later of Betty Boop and Popeye fame), and Walter Lantz (later of Woody Woodpecker fame). The cartoon studio operated from c. 1914 until 1928. Some of the first cartoon stars from the Bray studios were Farmer Alfalfa (by Paul Terry) and Bobby Bumps (by Earl Hurd).

=== Hearst's International Film Service ===
Krazy Kat – Bugologist (1916)

Newspaper tycoon William Randolph Hearst founded International Film Service in 1916. Hearst lured most of Barré Studio's animators away, with Gregory La Cava becoming the head of the studio. They produced adaptations of many comic strips from Hearst's newspapers in a rather limited fashion, giving just a little motion to the characters while mainly using the dialog balloons to deliver the story. The most notable series is Krazy Kat, probably the first of many anthropomorphic cartoon cat characters and other talking animals. Before the studio stopped in 1918, it had employed some new talents, including Vernon Stallings, Ben Sharpsteen, Jack King, John Foster, Grim Natwick, Burt Gillett and Isadore Klein.

=== Rotoscoping ===
In 1915, Max Fleischer applied for a patent, which was granted in 1917, for a technique which became known as rotoscoping: the process of using live-action film recordings as a reference point to more easily create realistic animated movements. The technique was often used in the Out of the Inkwell series by John Bray Studios (and others). The series resulted from experimental rotoscoped images of Max's brother, Dave Fleischer, performing as a clown, which evolved into the character who would become known as Koko the Clown.

=== Felix the Cat ===
The 1919 Feline Follies by Pat Sullivan

In 1919, Otto Messmer of Pat Sullivan Studios created Felix the Cat. Pat Sullivan, the studio head, took all of the credit for Felix, a common practice in the early days of studio animation. Felix the Cat was distributed by Paramount Studios and attracted a large audience, eventually becoming one of the most recognized cartoon characters in film history. Felix was the first cartoon to be merchandised.

=== Quirino Cristiani: the first animated features ===
The first known animated feature film was El Apóstol by Quirino Cristiani, released on 9 November 1917 in Argentina. This successful 70-minute satire utilized a cardboard cutout technique, reportedly with 58,000 frames at 14 frames per second. Cristiani's next feature Sin dejar rastros was released in 1918, but it received no press coverage and poor public attendance before it was confiscated by the police for diplomatic reasons. None of Cristiani's feature films have survived.

== 1920s: Absolute film, synchronized sound and the rise of Disney ==
A number of key events occurred in the 1920s, including the development of the first animations with synchronized sound, and the founding of the Walt Disney Studio. The decade also saw the first appearance of Mickey Mouse in Steamboat Willie (1928).

=== Absolute film ===
In the early 1920s, the absolute film movement with artists such as Walter Ruttmann, Hans Richter, Viking Eggeling and Oskar Fischinger made short abstract animations which proved influential. Although some later abstract animation works by, for instance, Len Lye and Norman McLaren would be widely appreciated, the genre largely remained a relatively obscure avant-garde art form, while direct influences or similar ideas would occasionally pop up in mainstream animation like in Disney's Toccata and Fugue in D Minor in Fantasia (1940), which Fischinger originally collaborated on until his work was scrapped, and which was partly inspired by the works of Lye or the later movie The Dot and the Line (1965) by Chuck Jones.

=== Early synchronized sound: Song Car-Tunes and Aesop's Sound Fables ===
My Old Kentucky Home (1926)

From May 1924 to September 1926, Dave and Max Fleischer's Inkwell Studios produced 19 sound cartoons, part of the Song Car-Tunes series, using the Phonofilm "sound-on-film" process. The series also introduced the "bouncing ball" above lyrics to guide audiences to sing along to the music. My Old Kentucky Home from June 1926 was probably the first film to feature a bit of synchronized animated dialogue, with a dog mouthing the words "Follow the ball, and join in, everybody". The Bimbo character was further developed in Fleischer's Talkartoons (1929–1932).

Paul Terry's Dinner Time, from his Aesop's Fables (1921–1936) series, premiered on 1 September 1928 with a synchronized soundtrack that contained dialogue. Terry was urged to add the novelty against his wishes by the new studio owner Van Beuren. Although the series and its main character Farmer Al Falfa had been popular, audiences were not impressed by this first episode with sound.

=== Lotte Reiniger ===
The earliest surviving animated feature film is the 1926 silhouette-animated Die Abenteuer des Prinzen Achmed (Adventures of Prince Achmed), which used colour-tinted film. It was directed by German Lotte Reiniger and her husband Carl Koch. Walter Ruttmann created visual background effects. French/Hungarian collaborator Berthold Bartosch or Reiniger created depth of field by putting scenographic elements and figures on several levels of glass plates with illumination from below and the camera vertically above. Later, a similar technique became the basis for the multiplane camera.

=== Early Disney: Laugh-O-Grams, Julius, Alice ===
Newman Laugh-O-gram

Between 1920 and 1922, cartoonists Walt Disney, Ub Iwerks and Fred Harman worked at the Slide Company (soon renamed to Kansas City Film Ad Company), which produced cutout animation commercials. Disney started experimenting with drawn animation techniques in his parents' garage and managed to sell a series that satirized current local topics to the owner of the three local Newman Theatres as weekly Newman Laugh-O-Grams in 1921. With his short-lived own company Laugh-O-Gram Films, Inc., Disney, together with Iwerks, Fred's brother Hugh Harman, Rudolf Ising and Carman Maxwell produced a series of circa seven-minute modernized fairy tale cartoons, inspired by Terry's Aesop's Fables. The studio went bankrupt in 1923, but had already made the unsold 12-minute film Alice's Wonderland, featuring a live-action girl (Virginia Davis) interacting with numerous cartoon characters, including the Felix-inspired Julius the Cat (who had already appeared in the Laugh-O-Gram fairy tales without a name).

=== Winkler Pictures ===
When Disney moved to Hollywood, he managed to close a deal with New York film company Winkler Pictures, led by Margaret J. Winkler, who had just lost the rights to Felix the Cat and Out of the Inkwell. To make the Alice Comedies series (1923–1927), Iwerks also moved to Hollywood, later followed by Ising, Harman, Maxwell, and Film Ad colleague Friz Freleng. The series was successful enough to last 57 episodes, but Disney eventually preferred to create a new fully animated series. Oswald the Lucky Rabbit followed in 1927 and was a hit, but after failed negotiations for continuation in 1928, Charles Mintz took direct control of production and Disney lost his character and most of his staff to Mintz. Mintz lost the franchise to Universal Pictures and focused on his East Coast studio, which was founded by Bill Nolan and later Ben Harrison and Manny Gould. This studio would later be purchased by Columbia Pictures.

=== Mickey Mouse ===
Steamboat Willie

Disney and Iwerks developed Mickey Mouse in 1928 to replace Oswald. A first film entitled Plane Crazy failed to impress a test audience and did not raise sufficient interest of potential distributors. After some live-action movies with synchronized sound had become successful, Disney put the new Mickey Mouse cartoon The Gallopin' Gaucho on hold to start work on a special sound production which would launch the series more convincingly. Much of the action in the resulting Steamboat Willie (November 1928) involves the making of sounds, for instance Mickey uses livestock aboard the boat as musical instruments. The film became a huge success and Mickey Mouse would soon become the most popular cartoon character in history.

=== Harman-Ising Productions ===
A test film featuring Bosko and produced by Harman and Ising in 1929.

Bosko was created in 1927 by Hugh Harman and Rudolf Ising, specifically with talkies in mind. They were still working for Disney at the time, but they left in 1928 to work on the Oswald the Lucky Rabbit cartoons at Universal for about a year, and then they produced the Bosko pilot in May 1929 to shop for a distributor. They signed with Leon Schlesinger Productions and started the Looney Tunes series for Warner Bros. Pictures in 1930. Bosko was the star of 39 Warner Bros. cartoons before Harman and Ising took Bosko to MGM after leaving Warner Bros. After two MGM cartoons, the character received a dramatic make-over that was much less appreciated by audiences. Bosko's career ended in 1938.

== 1930s: Color, depth, cartoon superstars and Snow White ==
While the global economy suffered under the Great Depression through the 1930s, animation continued to flourish. Early color processes came into use, along with the use of the multiplane camera. In 1937, Snow White debuted in theatres—the first full-length traditionally animated feature film.

=== Two-strip color ===
The multi-colored lithograph technique of the early European animated film loops for home use seems not to have been applied to theatrically released animated films. While the original prints of The Adventures of Prince Achmed featured film tinting, most theatrically released animated films before 1930 were black and white. Effective color processes thus were a welcome innovation in Hollywood and seemed especially suitable for cartoons.

A cartoon segment in the feature film King of Jazz (April 1930), made by Walter Lantz and Bill Nolan, was the first animation presented in two-strip Technicolor.

Fiddlesticks, released together with King of Jazz, was the first Flip the Frog film and the first project Ub Iwerks worked on after he left Disney to set up his studio. In England, the cartoon was released in Harriscolor, a two-color process, probably as the first theatrically released standalone animated cartoon to boast both sound and color.

=== Disney's Silly Symphonies in Technicolor ===
When the Silly Symphonies series, started in 1929, was less popular than Disney had hoped, he turned to new technological innovation to improve the impact of the series. In 1932 he worked with the Technicolor company to create the first full-color animation Flowers and Trees, debuting the three-strip technique (the first use in live-action movies came about two years later). The cartoon was successful and won an Academy Award for Short Subjects, Cartoons. Disney temporarily had a deal for the exclusive use of Technicolor's full-color technique in animated films. He even waited before producing the ongoing Mickey Mouse series in color, so the Silly Symphonies would have their special appeal to audiences. After the exclusivity deal lapsed in September 1935, full-color animation soon became the industry standard.

Silly Symphonies inspired many cartoon series that boasted various other color systems until Technicolor was not exclusive to Disney anymore, including Ub Iwerks' ComiColor Cartoons (1933–1936), Van Beuren Studios' Rainbow Parade (1934–1936), Fleischer's Color Classics (1934–1941), Charles Mintz's Color Rhapsody (1934–1949), MGM's Happy Harmonies (1934–1938), George Pal's Puppetoons (1932–1947), and Walter Lantz's Swing Symphony (1941–1945).

=== Multiplane cameras and the stereopticon process ===
Snow White and the Seven Dwarfs (1937) trailer clip with multiplane effects

Several techniques were developed to create the impression of depth. The most common technique was to have characters move between several layers that could be moved independently, corresponding to the laws of perspective (e.g. the further away from the camera, the slower the speed).

Lotte Reiniger had already designed a type of multiplane camera for Die Abenteuer des Prinzen Achmed and her collaborator Berthold Bartosch used a similar setup for his intricately detailed 25-minute film L'Idée (1932).

In 1933, Ub Iwerks developed a multiplane camera and used it for several Willie Whopper (1933–1934) and ComiColor Cartoons episodes.

The Fleischers developed the very different stereopticon process in 1933 for their Color Classics. It was used in the first episode Poor Cinderella (1934) and most of the following episodes. The process involved three-dimensional sets built and sculpted on a large turntable. The photographed cells were placed within the movable set so that the animated characters would appear to move in front and behind the 3D elements within the scene when the turntable was made to rotate.

Disney employee William Garity developed a multiplane camera that could have up to seven layers of artwork. It was tested in the Academy Award-winning Silly Symphony episode The Old Mill (1937) and used prominently in Snow White and later features.

=== New colorful cartoon superstars ===
After the additions of sound and color were a huge success for Disney, other studios followed. By the end of the decade, almost all theatrical cartoons were produced in full color.

Initially, music and songs were the focus of many series, as indicated by titles such as Song Car-Tunes, Silly Symphonies, Merrie Melodies and Looney Tunes, but it was the recognizable characters that stuck with audiences. Mickey Mouse was the first cartoon superstar who surpassed Felix the Cat's popularity, but soon dozens of cartoon superstars followed, many remaining popular for decades.

Warner Bros. had a vast music library that could be used in cartoons, and inspired many cartoons as well, while Disney needed to create the music for every cartoon. Leon Schlesinger sold Warner Bros. a second series called Merrie Melodies, which until 1939 contractually needed to contain at least one refrain from the music catalog. Unlike Looney Tunes with Bosko, Merrie Melodies only featured a few recurring characters like Foxy, Piggy and Goopy Geer before Harman and Ising left in 1933. Bosko was replaced with Buddy for the Looney Tunes series, but he lasted only two years, while Merrie Melodies continued without recurring characters. Eventually, the two series became indistinguishable and produced many new characters that became popular. Animator/director Bob Clampett designed Porky Pig (1935) and Daffy Duck (1937) and was responsible for much of the energetic animation and irreverent humor associated with the series. The 1930s also saw early anonymous incarnations of characters who would later become Elmer Fudd (1937/1940) and Bugs Bunny (1938/1940). Beginning in 1937, Mel Blanc performed most of the characters' voices.

Disney introduced new characters to the Mickey Mouse universe who would become very popular, including Minnie Mouse (1928), Pluto (1930), Goofy (1932), and a character who would soon become the public's new favorite: Donald Duck (1934). Disney also realized that the success of animated films depended upon telling emotionally gripping stories; he developed a "story department" where storyboard artists separate from animators would focus on developing the story alone, which proved its worth when Disney studio released, in 1933, the first animated short to feature well-developed characters: Three Little Pigs. Disney kept on expanding his studio and started more and more production activities, including comics, merchandise, and theme parks. Most projects were based on the characters developed for theatrical short films.

Fleischer Studios introduced an unnamed dog character as Bimbo's girlfriend in Dizzy Dishes (1930), who evolved into the human female Betty Boop (1930–1939) and became Fleischer's best-known creation. In the 1930s they also added Hunky and Spunky (1938) and the popular animated adaptation of Popeye (1933) to their repertoire.

=== Hays Code and Betty Boop ===
Hays' Motion Picture Production Code for moral guidelines was applied in 1930 and rigidly enforced between 1934 and 1968. It had a big impact on filmmakers who had liked to create relatively saucy material. An infamous example, Betty Boop suffered greatly when she had to be changed from a carefree flapper with an innocent sex appeal into a more wholesome and much tamer character wearing a fuller dress. Her boyfriend Bimbo's disappearance was probably also the result of the Code's disapproval of mixed-species relationships.

=== Snow White and the breakthrough of the animated feature ===
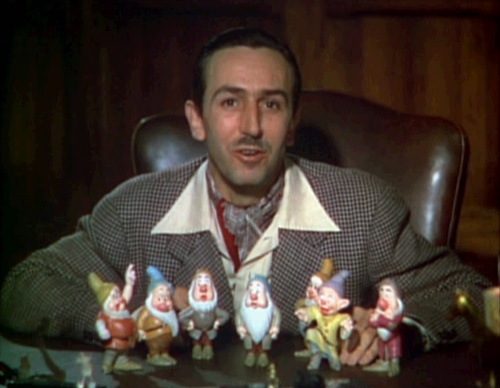
Disney and dwarfs in Snow White trailer

At least eight animated feature films were released before Disney's Snow White and the Seven Dwarfs, while at least another two earlier animated feature projects remained unfinished. Most of these films (of which only four survive) were made using cutout, silhouette or stop-motion techniques. Among the lost animated features were three features by Quirino Cristiani, who premiered his third feature Peludópolis on 18 September 1931 in Buenos Aires with a Vitaphone sound-on-disc synchronized soundtrack. It was received quite positively by critics, but did not become a hit and was an economic fiasco for the filmmaker. Cristiani soon realized that he could no longer make a career with animation in Argentina. The only other feature film, The Academy Award Review of Walt Disney Cartoons—also by Disney—was hand-drawn. It was released seven months before Snow White to promote that movie's upcoming release. Many do not consider the Review a genuine feature film, because it is a package film and lasts only 41 minutes. It does meet the official definitions of a feature film by the British Film Institute, the Academy of Motion Picture Arts and Sciences, and the American Film Institute, which require that the film has to be over 40 minutes long.

When it became known that Disney was working on a feature-length animation, critics regularly referred to the project as "Disney's folly", believing that audiences could not stand the expected bright colors and jokes for such a long time. Snow White and the Seven Dwarfs premiered on 21 December 1937 and became a worldwide success.

The Fleischer studios followed Disney's example with Gulliver's Travels in 1939, which was a minor success at the box office.

=== Early TV animation ===
In April 1938, when about 50 television sets were connected, NBC aired the eight-minute low-budget cartoon Willie the Worm. It was specially made for this broadcast by former Disney employee Chad Grothkopf, mainly with cutouts and a bit of cel animation. About a year later, on 3 May 1939, Disney's Donald's Cousin Gus was premiered on NBC's experimental W2XBS channel, a few weeks before the short cartoon was released in movie theaters, as part of the first full-evening program.

== 1940s: Feature films and the rise of television ==
Operation Snafu, directed by Friz Freleng in 1945

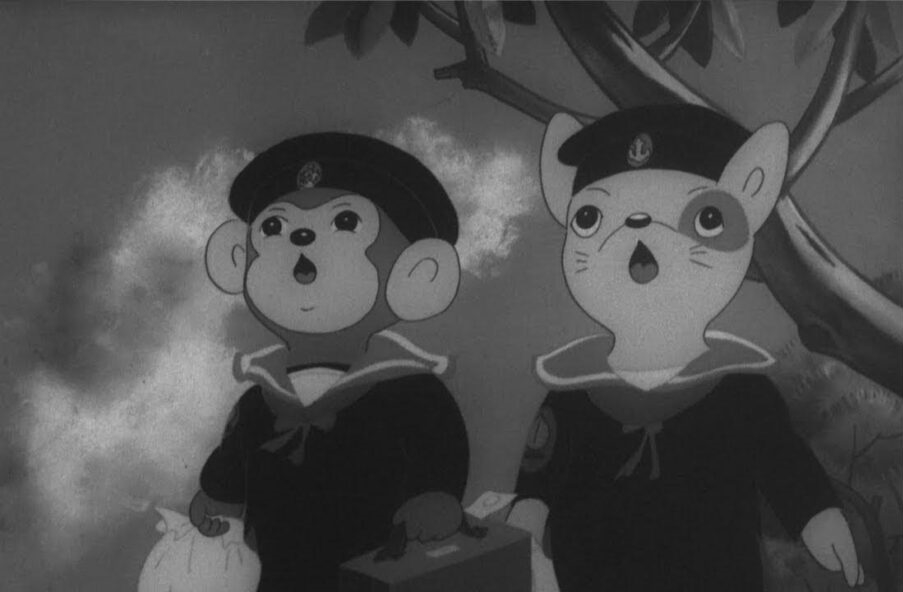
Screenshot from 桃太郎 海の神兵 (Momotaro: Sacred Sailors) (1944)

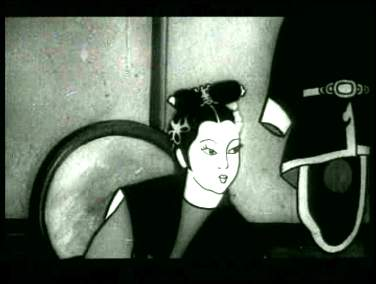
铁扇公主 (Princess Iron Fan) (1941) screenshot

=== Wartime propaganda ===
Several governments had already used animation in public information films, like those by the GPO Film Unit in the U.K. and Japanese educational films. During World War II, animation became a common medium for propaganda. The US government contracted its best studios to work for the war effort.

To instruct service personnel about all kinds of military subjects and to boost morale, Warner Bros. was contracted for several shorts and the special animated series Private Snafu. The character was created by the famous movie director Frank Capra, Dr. Seuss was involved in screenwriting and the series was directed by Chuck Jones. Disney also produced several instructive shorts and even personally financed the feature-length Victory Through Air Power (1943) that promoted the idea of long-range bombing.

Many popular characters promoted war bonds, like Bugs Bunny in Any Bonds Today?, Disney's little pigs in The Thrifty Pig and a whole bunch of Disney characters in All Together. Daffy Duck asked for scrap metal for the war effort in Scrap Happy Daffy. Minnie Mouse and Pluto invited civilians to collect their cooking grease so it could be used for making explosives in Out of the Frying Pan Into the Firing Line. There were several more political propaganda short films, like Warner Bros.' Fifth Column Mouse, Disney's Chicken Little and the more serious Education for Death and Reason and Emotion (nominated for an Academy Award).

Such wartime films were very appreciated. Bugs Bunny became something of a national icon and Disney's propaganda short Der Fuehrer's Face (starring Donald Duck) won the company its tenth Academy Award for cartoon short subjects.

Japan's first feature-length animated film, 桃太郎 海の神兵 (Momotaro: Sacred Sailors), was made in 1944, under orders of the Ministry of the Navy of Japan. It was designed for children and, partly inspired by Fantasia, was meant to inspire dreams and hope for peace. The main characters are an anthropomorphic monkey, dog, bear, and pheasant who become parachute troopers (except the pheasant who becomes a pilot) tasked with invading the island of Celebes. An epilogue hints at America being the target for the next generation.

=== Feature animation in the 1940s ===
==== High ambitions, setbacks, and cutbacks in US feature animation ====
Disney's next two features (Pinocchio and the very ambitious concert film Fantasia, both released in 1940) and Fleischer Studios' second animated feature Mr. Bug Goes to Town (1941/1942) were all received favorably by critics, but failed at the box office during their initial theatrical runs. The primary cause was that World War II had cut off most foreign markets. These setbacks discouraged most companies that had plans for animated features.

Disney cut back on costs for the next features and first released The Reluctant Dragon, mostly consisting of a live-action tour of the new studio in Burbank, partly in black and white, with four short cartoons. It was a mild success at the worldwide box office and was followed only a few months later by Dumbo (1941), animated in a relatively simple style and only 64 minutes long. The limited length and economically efficient techniques helped the movie make a profit at the box office, and critics and audiences reacted positively. Disney's next feature Bambi (1942) returned to a larger budget and a lavish style, but the more dramatic story, darker mood, and lack of fantasy elements were not well-received during its initial run and the movie lost money at the box office.

Although all the other eight Disney features of the 1940s were package films, or combinations with live-action (for instance Saludos Amigos (1943) and The Three Caballeros (1944)), Disney kept faith in animated features. Only a few other American animation studios managed to release more than a handful of features before the 1990s.

==== Non-US animation forces ====
American cel-animated films dominated the worldwide production and consumption of theatrical animated releases since the 1920s. Disney's work especially proved to be very popular and influential around the world. Studios from other countries could hardly compete with American productions so many animation producers outside the US chose to work with techniques other than cel animation, such as puppet animation or cut-out animation. However, several countries (most notably Russia, China, and Japan) developed their own relatively large "traditional" animation industries. Russia's Soyuzmultfilm animation studio, founded in 1936, employed up to 700 skilled workers and, during the Soviet period, produced 20 films per year on average. Some titles that were noticed outside their respective domestic markets include 铁扇公主 (Princess Iron Fan) (China 1941, influential in Japan), Конёк-Горбуно́к (The Humpbacked Horse) (Russia 1947, winner special jury award in Cannes in 1950), I Fratelli Dynamite (The Dynamite Brothers) (Italy 1949) and La Rosa di Bagdad (The Rose of Baghdad) (Italy 1949, the 1952 English dub starred Julie Andrews).

=== Successful theatrical short cartoons of the 1940s ===
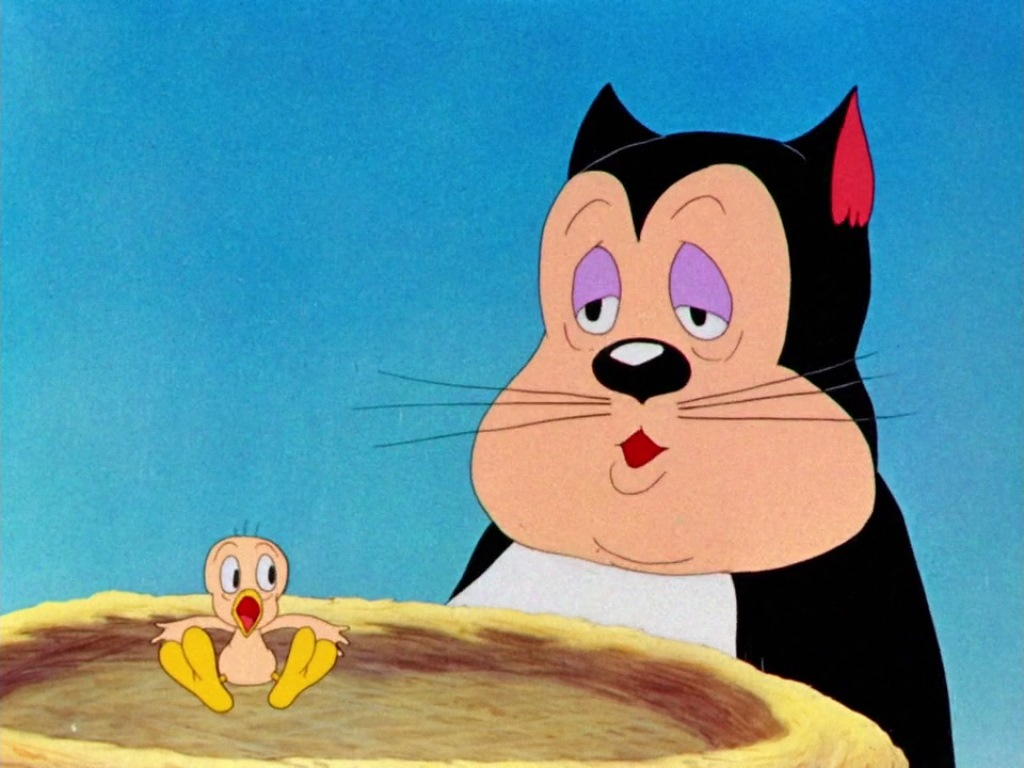
A yet unnamed Tweety debuting in A Tale of Two Kitties (1942)

Tex Avery's Jerky Turkey (1945)

During the "Golden Age of American animation", new studios competed with the studios that survived the sound and color innovation battles of the previous decades. Cartoon animals were still the norm and music was still a relevant element, but often lost its main stage appeal to Disney's melodramatic storytelling or the wild humor in Looney Tunes and other cartoons.

Disney continued their cartoon successes, adding Daisy Duck (1937/1940) and Chip 'n' Dale (1943/1947) to the Mickey Mouse universe, while Warner Bros. developed new characters to join their popular Merrie Melodies/Looney Tunes cast, including Tweety, Henery Hawk (both in 1942), Pepé Le Pew, Sylvester the Cat, Yosemite Sam (all in 1945), Foghorn Leghorn, Barnyard Dawg, Gossamer (all in 1946), Marvin the Martian (1948), and Wile E. Coyote and Road Runner (1949).

Other new popular characters and series were Terrytoons' Mighty Mouse (1942–1961) and Heckle and Jeckle (1946–1966), and Screen Gems' The Fox and the Crow (1941–1950).

==== Fleischer/Famous Studios ====
Fleischer launched its spectacular Superman adaptation in 1941. The success came too late to save the studio from its financial problems and in 1942 Paramount Pictures took over the studio from the resigning Fleischer Brothers. The studio which was renamed to Famous Studios continued the Popeye and Superman series, developed popular adaptations of Little Lulu (1943–1948, licensed by Gold Key Comics), Casper, the Friendly Ghost (1945) and created new series, such as Little Audrey (1947–1958) and Baby Huey (1950–1959).

==== Walter Lantz Productions ====
Walter Lantz started his animation career at Hearst's studio at the age of 16. He had also worked for the Bray Studios and Universal Pictures, where he had gained control over the Oswald the Lucky Rabbit cartoons in 1929 (reportedly by winning the character and control of the studio in a poker bet with Universal president Carl Laemmle). In 1935, the Universal studio was turned into the independent Walter Lantz Productions, but remained on the Universal lot and continued to produce cartoons for Universal to distribute. When Oswald's popularity dwindled and the character was eventually retired in 1938, Lantz's productions went without successful characters until he developed Andy Panda in 1939. The anthropomorphic panda starred in over two dozen cartoons until 1949, but he was soon overshadowed by the iconic Woody Woodpecker, who debuted in the Andy Panda cartoon Knock Knock in 1940. Other popular Lantz characters include Wally Walrus (1944), Buzz Buzzard (1948), Chilly Willy (1953), Hickory, Dickory, and Doc (1959).

==== MGM ====
After distributing Ub Iwerks' Flip the Frog and Willie Whopper cartoons and Happy Harmonies by Harman-Ising Productions, Metro-Goldwyn-Mayer founded its own cartoon department in 1937. The studio had much success with Barney Bear (1939–1954), William Hanna and Joseph Barbera's Tom and Jerry (1940) and Spike and Tyke (1942).

In 1941, Tex Avery left Warner Bros. for MGM and created Droopy (1943), Screwy Squirrel (1944) and George and Junior (1946) there.

==== UPA ====
While Disney and most of the other studios sought a sense of depth and realism in animation, UPA animators (including former Disney employee John Hubley) had a different artistic vision. They developed a much sparser and more stylized type of animation, inspired by Russian examples. The studio was formed in 1943 and initially worked on government contracts. A few years later they signed a contract with Columbia Pictures, took over The Fox and the Crow from Screen Gems, and earned Oscar nominations for their first two theatrical shorts in 1948 and 1949. While the field of animation was dominated by anthropomorphic animals at the time when the studio was allowed to create a new character, they came up with the near-sighted old man. Mr. Magoo (1949) became a hit and would be featured in many short films. Between 1949 and 1959, UPA received 15 Oscar nominations, winning their first Academy Award with the Dr. Seuss adaptation Gerald McBoing-Boing (1950), followed by two more for When Magoo Flew (1954) and Magoo's Puddle Jumper (1956). The distinctive style was influential and even affected the big studios, including Warner Bros. and Disney. Apart from effective freedom in artistic expression, UPA had proved that sparser animation could be appreciated as much as (or even more than) the expensive lavish styles.

=== TV animation in the 1940s ===
The back catalog of animated cartoons from many studios, originally produced for a short theatrical run, proved very valuable for television broadcasting. Movies for Small Fry (1947), presented by "big brother" Bob Emery on Tuesday evenings on the New York WABD-TV channel, was one of the first TV series for children and featured many classic Van Beuren Studios cartoons. It was continued on the DuMont Television Network as the daily show Small Fry Club (1948–1951) with a live audience in a studio setting.

Many classical series from Walter Lantz, Warner Bros., Terrytoons, MGM, and Disney similarly found a new life in TV shows for children, with many reruns, for decades. Instead of studio settings and live-action presentations, some shows would feature new animation to present or string together the older cartoons.

The earliest American animated series specifically produced for TV came about in 1949, with Adventures of Pow Wow (43 five-minute episodes broadcast on Sunday mornings from January to November) and Jim and Judy in Teleland (52 episodes, later also sold to Venezuela and Japan).

== 1950s: Shift from theatrical cartoons to limited animation in TV series for children ==
Col. Bleep's Arrival on Earth (1956)

Most theatrical cartoons had been produced for non-specific audiences. Dynamic action and gags with talking animals in clear drawing styles and bright colors were naturally appealing to young children, but the cartoons regularly contained violence and sexual innuendo and were often screened together with newsreels and feature films that were not for children. After the Paramount Decree broke up block booking practices in the United States, in the 1950s, animation production shifted from theatrical cartoons to television animation. Jason Mittell argues that during this time, this shift to television also unintentionally shifted popular understandings of animation. With the rise of the Saturday morning cartoon block, Mittell observes that by the end of the 1960s, animation transformed from "a mass-market genre with so-called 'kidult’ appeal [and] became marginalized into the kid-only Saturday morning periphery." On US television, cartoons were mainly programmed for children, in convenient time slots on weekend mornings, weekday afternoons, or early evenings.

The scheduling constraints of the 1950s American TV animation process, and notable issues of resource management (higher quantity needed to be made in less time for a lower budget compared to theatrical animation), led to the development of various techniques now known as limited animation. The sparser type of animation which originally had been an artistic choice of style for UPA was embraced as a means to cut back production time and costs. Full-frame animation ("on ones") became rare in the United States, outside its use for a decreasing amount of theatrical productions. Chuck Jones coined the term "illustrated radio" to refer to the shoddy style of most television cartoons that depended more on their soundtracks than visuals. Some producers also found that limited animation looked better than the fully animated styles on the small black-and-white TV screens of the time.

=== Animated TV series of the 1950s ===
Jay Ward produced the popular Crusader Rabbit (tested in 1948, original broadcasts in 1949–1952 and 1957–1959), with the successful use of a limited-animation style.

At the end of the 1950s, several studios dedicated to TV animation production started competing. While the focus for competition in theatrical animation had been on quality and innovation, it now shifted to delivering animation quickly and cheaply. Critics noted how the quality of many shows was often poor in comparison to classic cartoons, with rushed animation and run-of-the-mill stories. Network executives were satisfied as long as there were enough viewers, and the huge amounts of young viewers were not bothered with the lack of quality that the critics perceived. Watching Saturday-morning cartoon programming, up to four hours long, became a favorite pastime of most American children in mid-1960s, and was a mainstay for decades.

Disney had entered into TV production relatively early, but for a long time refrained from creating new animated series. Instead, Disney had their anthology series on the air since 1954 in prime time three-hour slots, starting with the Walt Disney's Disneyland series (1954–1958), clearly promoting the Disneyland theme park that opened in 1955. Walt Disney personally hosted the series that –apart from older cartoons– featured segments with looks behind the scenes at film-making processes or with new live-action adventures among others.

William Hanna and Joseph Barbera (the creators of Tom and Jerry) continued as Hanna-Barbera after Metro-Goldwyn-Mayer closed their animation studio in 1957 when MGM considered their back catalog sufficient for further sales. While Hanna-Barbera only made one theatrically released series with Loopy de Loop (1959–1965), they proved to be the most prolific and successful producers of animated television series for several decades. Starting with The Ruff and Reddy Show (1957–1960), they continued with successful series like The Huckleberry Hound Show (1958, the first half-hour television program to feature only animation) and The Quick Draw McGraw Show (1959–1961).

Other notable programs include UPA's Gerald McBoing Boing (1956–1957), Soundac's Colonel Bleep (1957–1960, the first animated TV series in color), Terrytoons's Tom Terrific (1958), and Jay Ward's The Adventures of Rocky and Bullwinkle and Friends (1959–1964).

In contrast to the international film market (developed during the silent era when language problems were limited to title cards), TV-pioneering in most countries (often connected to radio broadcasting) focused on the domestic production of live programs. Rather than importing animated series that usually would have to be dubbed, children's programming could more easily and more cheaply be produced in other ways (for instance, featuring puppetry). One notable method was the real-time "animation" of cutout figures in Captain Pugwash (1957) on the BBC. One of the few early animated series for TV that was seen outside of the country of production was Belvision Studios' Les Aventures de Tintin, d'après Hergé (Hergé's Adventures of Tintin) (Belgium 1957–1964, directed by Ray Goossens), broadcast by the BBC in 1962 and syndicated in the United States from 1963 to 1971.

=== Theatrical short cartoons in the 1950s ===
Warner Bros. introduced new characters Granny, Sylvester Jr. (both in 1950), Speedy Gonzales, Ralph Wolf and Sam Sheepdog (all three in 1953), and Tasmanian Devil (1954).

=== Theatrical feature animation in the 1950s ===
==== Disney ====
After a string of package features and live-action/animation combos, Disney returned to fully animated feature films with Cinderella in 1950 (the first since Bambi). Its success practically saved the company from bankruptcy. It was followed by Alice in Wonderland (1951), which flopped at the box office and initially received negative reviews. Peter Pan (1953) and Lady and the Tramp (1955) were hits. The ambitious, much delayed, and more expensive Sleeping Beauty (1959) lost money at the box office and caused doubts about the future of Walt Disney's animation department. Like "Alice in Wonderland" and most of Disney's flops, it would later be commercially successful through re-releases and would eventually be regarded as a true classic.

==== Non-American ====
- Jeannot l'intrépide (Johnny the Giant Killer) (France, 1950 feature)
- Érase una vez... (Spain, 1950 feature)
- Le Roi et l'Oiseau (The King and the Mockingbird) (France, 1952 unfinished feature release, 1980 finished release, influential for Hayao Miyazaki and Isao Takahata)
- Animal Farm (U.K./U.S.A., 1954 feature)
- 乌鸦为什么是黑的 (Why Is the Crow Black-Coated) (China, 1956 short film, Venice Film Festival)
- Снежная королева (The Snow Queen) (Soviet Union, 1957 feature)
- Krtek (Mole) (Czechoslovakia, 1956 short film series)
- 白蛇伝 (Panda and the Magic Serpent) (Japan, 1958 feature)
- 少年猿飛佐助 (Magic Boy) (Japan, 1959 feature, first anime released in the U.S. in 1961)

== 1960s: Animated TV shows and the rise of anime ==
=== American animated TV series and specials in the 1960s ===
Total Television was founded in 1959 to promote General Mills products with original cartoon characters in Cocoa Puffs commercials (1960–1969) and the General Mills-sponsored TV series King Leonardo and His Short Subjects (1960–1963, repackaged shows until 1969), Tennessee Tuxedo and His Tales (1963–1966, repackaged shows until 1972), The Underdog Show (1964–1967, repackaged shows until 1973) and The Beagles (1966–1967). Animation for all of these series was produced at Gamma Studios in Mexico. Total Television stopped producing after 1969 when General Mills no longer wanted to sponsor them.

Many of the American animated TV series from the 1960s to 1980s were based on characters and formats that had already proved popular in other media. UPA produced The Dick Tracy Show (1961–1962), based on comic books. Filmation, active from 1962 to 1989, created few original characters, but many adaptations of DC Comics, live-action TV series (including Lassie's Rescue Rangers (1973–1975) and Star Trek: The Animated Series), some live-action features (including Journey to the Center of the Earth (1967–1969), and more). Grantray-Lawrence Animation was the first studio to adapt Marvel Comics superheroes in 1966. Pop groups got animated versions in The Beatles (1965–1966) and Rankin/Bass's The Jackson 5ive (1971–1972) and The Osmonds (1972). Hanna-Barbera turned comedians into cartoon characters with Laurel and Hardy (1966–1967) and The Abbott and Costello Cartoon Show (1967–1968). Format Films' The Alvin Show (1961–1962) was a spin-off of a 1958 novelty song and the subsequent comic books with redesigned versions of Alvin and the Chipmunks. Other series contained unlicensed appropriations. For instance, Hanna-Barbera's The Flintstones (1960–1966) was inspired by the sitcom The Honeymooners and creator Jackie Gleason considered suing Hanna-Barbera, but he did not want to be known as "the guy who yanked Fred Flintstone off the air".

The Flintstones was the first prime-time animated series and became immensely popular, it remained the longest-running network animated television series for three decades. Hanna-Barbera scored more hits with The Yogi Bear Show (1960–1962), The Jetsons (1962–1963, 1985, 1987), and Scooby-Doo, Where Are You! (1969–1970, later followed by other Scooby-Doo series).

From around 1968, after the assassination of Martin Luther King Jr. and then Robert F. Kennedy, and other violent acts made the public less at ease with violence in entertainment, networks hired censors to ban anything deemed too violent or suggestive from children's programming.

Apart from regular TV series, there were several noteworthy animated television (holiday) specials, starting with UPA's Mister Magoo's Christmas Carol (1962), followed a few years later by other classic examples such as the string of Bill Melendez' Peanuts specials (1965–2011, based on Charles M. Schulz's comic strip), and Chuck Jones's How the Grinch Stole Christmas! (1966, based on the story by Dr. Seuss).

==== Cambria Productions ====
Cambria Productions only occasionally used traditional animation and would often resort to camera movements, real-time movements between foreground and background cels, and integration of live-action footage. Creator Clark Haas explained: "We are not making animated cartoons. We are photographing 'motorized movement' and—the biggest trick of all—combining it with live-action... Footage that Disney does for $250,000 we do for $18,000." Their most famous trick was the Syncro-Vox technique of superimposing talking lips on the faces of cartoon characters instead of animating mouths synchronized to dialogue. This optical printing system had been patented in 1952 by Cambria's partner and cameraman Edwin Gillette and was first used for popular "talking animal" commercials. The method would later be widely used for comedic effect, but Cambria used it straight in their series Clutch Cargo (1959–1960), Space Angel (1962), and Captain Fathom (1965). Thanks to imaginative stories, Clutch Cargo was a surprise hit. Their last series, The New 3 Stooges (1965–1966), did not use Syncro-Vox. It contained 40 new live-action segments of the original Three Stooges that was spread and repeated through 126 segments of new animation (occasionally causing people to turn off their TV when live-action footage was repeated, convinced that they had already seen the episode).

=== American theatrical animation in the 1960s ===
For One Hundred and One Dalmatians (1961) production costs were restrained, helped by the xerography process that eliminated the inking process. Although the relatively sketchy look produced by the xerox process is often maligned by historians and critics, the animators at the time embraced being able to have their drawings transferred directly onto the finished picture. This period at Disney also coincided with the maturation of the "Nine Old Men", a tightly knit group of animators whom Walt entrusted with the development and animation of the films especially as Walt devoted increasingly more time to the construction of parks and other projects. Animators typically regard this period in the studio's history as the most accomplished in terms of the draftsmanship and overall quality of animation. Animation, character designs, and model sheets from this period are still used as reference by animation schools and studios today. "One Hundred and One Dalmatians" was a hit for the studio as was The Sword in the Stone (1963) though over the years it has become one of the least-known Disney features. 1964 saw the release of the live-action/animation hybrid Mary Poppins (1964) which received 13 Academy Awards nominations, including Best Picture. Disney's biggest animated feature of the 1960s was The Jungle Book (1967) which was both a critical and commercial success. This was also the final film that was overseen by Walt Disney before his death in 1966. After Walt's passing, the studio went into a period of long decline. Led by the Nine Old Men, the studio continued to produce films that were successful enough to enable the continuation of the studio. As veteran animators began to age, a training program was introduced to nurture the next generation of talent. The departure of Don Bluth sapped the studio of many veterans and forced many young animators into taking on bigger responsibilities. By the early 1980s, the Nine Old Men had retired, many veterans were gone, and this cohort was struggling to keep the studio viable.

UPA produced their first feature 1001 Arabian Nights (1959) (starring Mr. Magoo as Alladin's uncle) for Columbia Pictures, with little success. They tried again with Gay Purr-ee in 1962, released by Warner Bros. It was well received by critics, but failed at the box office and would be the last feature the studio made.

==== Decline of the theatrical short cartoon ====
The Supreme Court ruling of the Hollywood Anti-trust Case of 1948 prohibited "block bookings" in which hit feature films were exclusively offered to theatre owners in packages together with newsreels and cartoons or live-action short films. Instead of receiving a reasonable percentage of a package deal, short cartoons had to be sold separately for the prices that theatre owners were willing to pay for them. Short cartoons were relatively expensive and could now be dropped from the program without people losing interest in the main feature, which became a sensible way to reduce costs when more and more potential movie-goers seemed to stay at home to watch movies on their television sets. Most cartoons had to be re-released several times to recoup the invested budget. By the end of the 1960s most studios had ceased producing theatrical cartoons. Even Warner Bros. and Disney, with occasional exceptions, stopped making short theatrical cartoons after 1969. Walter Lantz was the last of the classic cartoon producers to give up when he closed his studio in 1973.

==== DePatie–Freleng ====
DePatie–Freleng Enterprises, founded by Friz Freleng and David H. DePatie in 1963 after Warner Bros. closed their animation department, was the only studio that found new success with short theatrical cartoon series after the 1950s. They created Pink Panther in 1963 for the opening and closing credits of the live-action Pink Panther film series featuring Peter Sellers. Its success led to a series of short films (1964–1980) and TV series (1969–1980). Pink Panther was followed by the spin-off The Inspector (1965–1969), The Ant and the Aardvark (1969–1971), and a handful of other theatrical series. The Dogfather (1974–1976) was the last new series, but Pink Panther cartoons appeared in theaters until 1980, shortly before the demise of the studio in 1981. From 1966 to 1981 DePatie–Freleng also produced many TV series and specials.

=== Rise of anime ===
Japan was notably prolific and successful with its style of animation, which became known in the English language initially as Japanimation and eventually as anime. In general, anime was developed with limited-animation techniques that put more emphasis on aesthetic quality than on movement compared to USA animation in the 1960s. It also applies a relatively "cinematic" approach with zooming, panning, complex dynamic shots, and more attention to backgrounds which were instrumental to creating an atmosphere.

Anime was first domestically broadcast on TV in Japan in 1960. The export of theatrical anime features started around the same time. Within a few years, several anime TV series was made that would also receive varying levels of airplay in the United States and other countries, starting with the highly influential 鉄腕アトム (Astro Boy) (1963), followed by ジャングル大帝 (Kimba the White Lion) (1965–1966), エイトマン (8th Man) (1965), 魔法使いサリー (Sally the Witch) (1966–1967) and マッハGoGoGo (Mach GoGoGo a.k.a. Speed Racer) (1967).

The domestically popular サザエさん / Sazae-san started in 1969 and is the longest-running animated TV show in the world according to Guinness, with more than 2,250 episodes.

=== Early adult-oriented and counterculture animation ===
Before the end of the 1960s, hardly any adult-oriented animation had been produced. A notable exception was the pornographic short Eveready Harton in Buried Treasure (1928), presumably made by famous animators for a private party in honor of Winsor McCay, and not publicly screened until the late 1970s. After 1934, the Hays Code gave filmmakers in the United States little leeway to release risky material, until the code was replaced by the Motion Picture Association of America film rating system in 1968. While television programming of animation had made most people think of it as a medium for children or family entertainment, new theatrical animations proved otherwise.

Arguably, the philosophical, psychological, and sociological overtones of the Peanuts TV specials were relatively adult-oriented, while the specials were also enjoyable for children. In 1969 director Bill Melendez expanded the success of the series to cinemas with A Boy Named Charlie Brown. The theatrical follow-up Snoopy Come Home (1972) was a box-office flop, despite positive reviews. Race for Your Life, Charlie Brown (1977) and Bon Voyage, Charlie Brown (and Don't Come Back!!) (1980) were the only other theatrical traditionally animated feature films for Peanuts, while the TV specials continued until 2011.

The anti-establishment counterculture boom at the end of the 1960s impacted Hollywood early on. In animation, anti-war sentiments were present in several short underground films like Ward Kimball's Escalation (1968) (made independently from his employment at Disney) and the parody Mickey Mouse in Vietnam (1969). The less political parody Bambi meets Godzilla (1969) by Marv Newland, another underground short film for adults, is considered a great classic and, based on a poll of 1,000 people working in the animation industry, was included in The 50 Greatest Cartoons.

The popularity of psychedelia reportedly made the 1969 re-release of Disney's Fantasia popular among teenagers and college students, and the film started to make a profit. Similarly, Disney's Alice in Wonderland became popular with TV screenings in this period and with its 1974 theatrical re-release.

Also influenced by the psychedelic revolution, The Beatles' animated musical feature Yellow Submarine (1968) showed a broad audience how animation could be quite different from the well-known television cartoons and Disney features. Its distinctive design came from the art director Heinz Edelman. The film received widespread acclaim and would prove to be influential. Peter Max further popularized a similar visual style in his artworks.

=== Non-American animation in the 1960s ===
- わんぱく王子の大蛇退治 (The Little Prince and the Eight-Headed Dragon) (Japan, 1963 feature)
- 大鬧天宮 (Havoc in Heaven) (China, 1963 feature)
- ガリバーの宇宙旅行 (Gulliver's Travels Beyond the Moon) (Japan, 1965 feature)
- Calimero (Italy/Japan 1963–1972, TV series)
- Belvision's Pinocchio in Outer Space (Belgium/USA 1965, feature directed by Ray Goossens)
- West and Soda (Italy 1965, first feature by Bruno Bozzetto)

== 1970s: Adult-oriented cartoons and use in music videos ==
=== Breakthrough of adult-oriented and counterculture feature animation ===
Ralph Bakshi thought that the idea of "grown men sitting in cubicles drawing butterflies floating over a field of flowers, while American planes are dropping bombs in Vietnam and kids are marching in the streets, is ludicrous." He, therefore, created a more sociopolitical type of animation, starting with Fritz the Cat (1972), based on Robert Crumb's comic books and it was the first animated feature to receive an X-rating. The X-rating was used to promote the film and it became the highest-grossing independent animated film of all time. The success of Heavy Traffic (1973) made Bakshi the first since Disney to have two financially successful animated feature films in a row. The film utilized an artistic blend of techniques with still photography as the background in parts, a live-action scene of models with painted faces rendered in negative cinematography, a scene rendered in very limited sketchy animation that was only partly colored, detailed drawing, archival footage, and most characters animated in a consistent cartoon style throughout it all, except the last ten minutes which were fully filmed as a standard live-action film. He continued to experiment with different techniques in most of his next projects. His next projects Hey Good Lookin' (finished in 1975, but shelved by Warner Bros. until release in an adjusted version in 1982) and Coonskin (1975, suffered from protests against its perceived racism while satirizing it) were far less successful, but received more appreciation later on and became cult films.

Bakshi found new success with the fantasy films Wizards (1977) and The Lord of the Rings (1978). Both used rotoscoping for massive battle scenes. For Wizards the technique was used on archival footage as a solution to budgetary problems and rendered in a psychedelic artistic style. For The Lord of the Rings it became a means to create a look that Bakshi described as "real illustration as opposed to cartoons" for a film that he wanted to be true to Tolkien's work, with reference material shot with costumed actors in Spain. The more family-oriented television film The Return of the King (1980) by Rankin/Bass and Topcraft is sometimes regarded as an unofficial sequel after Bakshi's intended second part was not made, but they had already independently started their adaptation of the story on television with The Hobbit in 1977.

The imaginative French/Czech science fiction production La Planète sauvage (1973) was awarded the Grand Prix special jury prize at the 1973 Cannes Film Festival, and in 2016, it was ranked the 36th-greatest animated movie ever by Rolling Stone.

The British production Watership Down (1978) was a huge international success. It featured animal characters that looked more realistic than anthropomorphic, against watercolor backgrounds. Despite its dark and violent aspects, it was deemed suitable for all ages in the UK and rated PG in the United States.

=== Anime in Europe ===
Anime import offered relatively inexpensive animated series, but some European broadcasters thought of animation as something for young children and programmed anime series accordingly. This led to a lot of criticism when some programs were deemed too violent for children. Child-friendly adaptions of European stories ensured much more success in Europe, with popular titles such as アルプスの少女ハイジ (Heidi, Girl of the Alps) (1974) and みつばちマーヤの冒険 (Maya the Honey Bee) (1975).

Only a few animation studios were active in Europe and starting a new studio required a lot of time, effort, and money. For European producers interested in animated series, it made sense to collaborate with Japanese studios that could provide affordable animation of relatively high quality. Resulting productions of these arrangements include Barbapapa (The Netherlands/Japan/France 1973–1977), Wickie und die to starken Männer/小さなバイキング ビッケ (Vicky the Viking) (Austria/Germany/Japan 1974), Il était une fois... (Once Upon a Time...) (France/Japan 1978) and Doctor Snuggles (The Netherlands/West Germany/Japan/US 1979).

=== Artistic short-animation highlights ===
Short animated films mostly became a medium for film festivals in which independent animators showcased their talents. With the big studios away from the field, the Academy Award for Best Animated Short Film and nominations of the 1970s and 1980s usually went to relatively unknown artists.

La Linea (Italy 1971, 1978, 1986) is a popular animation series with the main character that is a part of an otherwise straight white line that runs horizontally across the screen.

Soviet/Russian animator Yuri Norstein "is considered by many to be not just the best animator of his era, but the best of all time", according to Peter Finn. He released a handful of award-winning short films in the 1970s:

- The Battle of Kerzhenets (Сеча при Керженце, 1971), in collaboration with Ivan Ivanov-Vano
- The Fox and the Hare (Лиса и заяц, 1973).
- The Heron and the Crane (Цапля и журавль, 1974).
- Hedgehog in the Fog (Ёжик в тумане, 1975).
- Tale of Tales (Сказка сказок, 1979).

Norstein has since 1981 been working on The Overcoat (Шинель) and participated in Winter Days (冬の日; 2003).

=== Early animated music videos ===
Although the combination of music and animation has had a long tradition, it took some time before animation became part of music videos after the medium became a proper genre in the mid-1970s.

Halas and Batchelor produced an animated video for Roger Glover's Love Is All (1974) that was broadcast internationally over decades, often as an interstitial program.

Pink Floyd's 1977 Welcome to the Machine music video, animated by Gerald Scarfe, was initially only used as a backdrop for concert performances.

Elvis Costello's Accidents Will Happen (1979) was made by Annabelle Jackel and Rocky Morton, known for their animated commercials. Despite an initially lukewarm reception, the video has since received acclaim.

Roger Mainwood and John Halas created an animated music video for Kraftwerk's Autobahn in 1979. The short wordless documentary Making it move... showed the production process.

A cartoon for Linda McCartney's Seaside Woman was made by Oscar Grillo and won a Palme d'Or for Best Short Film at the Cannes festival in 1980.

== 1980s: Who Framed Roger Rabbit and the return of Disney ==
=== American animation explosion (the 1980s) ===
Animation for Saturday morning American TV programming had grown formulaic by the end of the 1970s being based on older cartoons and comic strip characters (Superfriends, Scooby Doo, Popeye) The demand for more cartoon content arose with the Reagan administration deregulation of children's cartoons allowing for morning and afternoon time on UHF and cable channels now targeted toward children. Cartoons reflecting action, fantasy, and science fiction were common, with more complex narratives than cartoons of the previous decade. Several popular animated TV series of this time were based on toy lines, including Mattell's He-Man and the Masters of the Universe (1983–1985) and Hasbro's G.I. Joe (1983–1986), The Transformers (1984–1987) and My Little Pony (1986–1987). Other cartoons were based on superhero comics, TV personalities (Garry Coleman, Chuck Norris, Mr. T), other live-action shows (Alf, Punky Brewster) adult action or science fiction movies (Robocop, Rambo, Ghostbusters, Teen Wolf), video games (Pac-Man, Pole Position, Captain N), or children's literature (The Littles, Berenstain Bears). Japanese anime series were also edited and combined match to American broadcast guidelines (Robotech, Force Five).

Mostly in retrospect, Disney feature films have been perceived as going through a Dark Age in the decades after Walt Disney died in 1966 (despite a more steady string of box office successes than during the decades in which Walt was alive). The failure of The Black Cauldron (1985), made on an ambitious budget, was a new low. Tim Burton cited Disney's failure to train new animators during the 1960s and early 1970s as a reason for the decline, with Disney relying instead on an aging group of veterans.

Don Bluth, who had left Disney in 1979 together with nine other animators, started to compete with his former employer in cinemas in 1982 with The Secret of NIMH. The film garnered critical acclaim but was only a modest success at the box office.

=== Europe ===
In comparison to the American animation output around the start of the 1980s, international co-productions seemed more imaginative and more promising. The Smurfs (1981–1989), produced by Belgian Freddy Monnickendam's SEPP International in collaboration with Hanna-Barbera, was highly successful, and followed by Snorks (1984–1989) and Foofur (1986–1988). Production for Bzz Films' Bibifoc (Seabert) (1984–1988) was also handled by SEPP. Other notable international co-productions include Inspector Gadget (France/U.S.A. 1983) and The Wonderful Wizard of Oz (Canada/Japan 1986–1987).

In the U.K., Cosgrove Hall Films' very successful TV series Danger Mouse debuted in September 1981 and would continue until 1992, receiving 11 BAFTA nominations between 1983 and 1987. Also broadcast on Nickelodeon, the witty secret agent parody featuring a mouse became popular with young as well as adult American audiences and spawned the Count Duckula (1988–1993) spin-off.

=== Studio Ghibli and TV anime ===
Anime, together with printed manga, had built an enormous fandom in Japan and became a big part of the country's mainstream culture. Among anime's many genres, mecha (giant-robot science fiction) became particularly iconic. Print manga in particular entered into a golden age during the 1980s, buoyed by series such as Dragon Ball (1984–1995), and these series received successful long-running anime adaptations. The relatively new home video market grew very large and original video animation (OVA) became a much-appreciated medium, often with higher-quality productions than those made for TV (in contrast to the US, where direct-to-video was mainly a medium for releases that were not expected to be popular enough to warrant a theatrical release or TV broadcast and therefore often produced on a much lower budget). Naturally, the OVA medium was also suited for the consumption of erotic and pornographic animation. The first erotic OVA release was the ロリータアニメ (Lolita Anime) series from February 1984 to May 1985, soon followed by the Cream Lemon series (August 1984–2005). The genre became internationally known as hentai and is infamous for often containing perverse subject matters, including underage sex, monster sex, and tentacle sex (originally devised as a means to bypass Japanese censorship regulations). New anime series based on European material included ニルスのふしぎな旅 (The Wonderful Adventures of Nils) (1980–1981) and スプーンおばさん (Mrs. Pepper Pot) (1983–1984).

Hayao Miyazaki's epic theatrical features Nausicaä of the Valley of the Wind (1984), based on his manga, and 天空の城ラピュタ (Castle in the Sky) (1986) are regularly praised as some of the greatest animated films of all time. Castle in the Sky was the first feature for Studio Ghibli, founded in 1985 by Miyazaki with Isao Takahata and others. Studio Ghibli continued its success with Takahata's WWII film 火垂るの墓 (Grave of the Fireflies) (1988) and Miyazaki's iconic となりのトトロ (My Neighbor Totoro) (1988) and 魔女の宅急便 (Kiki's Delivery Service) (1989).

=== Roger Rabbit and the renaissance of American animation ===
Beginning in the mid-1980s, American animation would see a renaissance. This has been credited to a wave of talent that emerged from the California Institute of the Arts- primarily among the cohort that had studied there in the 1970s under Marc Davis, a member of the Nine Old Men that had influenced the language of animation in the 1920s and 1930s. At this time, many of the Nine were in the process of retiring. As an inside joke, many students in the classroom A113 have inserted the room code into their films, television series, and so forth in the years since. The students of A113 include Jerry Rees, John Lasseter, Tim Burton, Michael Peraza, and Brad Bird. Two other members of the nine old men, Ollie Johnston and Frank Thomas, published The Illusion of Life in 1981, an instructional book that has been voted the best animation book of all time and influenced James Baxter among other modern animators.

In cinemas, Robert Zemeckis' live-action/animation hit Who Framed Roger Rabbit (1988) also harkened back to the quality and zany comedy of the golden age of cartoons, with cameos of many of the superstars of that era, including Mickey, Minnie, Donald, Goofy, Betty Boop, Droopy, Woody Woodpecker and the Mel Blanc-voiced Bugs Bunny, Daffy Duck, Porky Pig, Tweety, and Sylvester, in addition to original characters such as Roger Rabbit, Jessica Rabbit, Baby Herman and Benny the Cab. The film won several Oscars and helped revive interest in theatrical feature animation and classic cartoons. The fully animated Roger Rabbit short film Tummy Trouble (1989) was then packaged with the live-action family comedy Honey, I Shrunk the Kids and believed to have helped that movie's quick start at the box-office. In collaboration with Steven Spielberg's Amblin Entertainment, Bluth's An American Tail (1986) became the highest-grossing non-Disney animated film at the time. The Land Before Time (1988) was equally successful, but Bluth's next five feature films flopped.

Mighty Mouse: The New Adventures (1987–1989) was one of the first animated TV shows to recapture the earlier quality and originality of American cartoons. It was produced by Ralph Bakshi and the first season was supervised by John Kricfalusi, who allowed plenty of artistic freedom for the animators. Rather than being a nostalgic rehash of the original Terrytoons series, it tried to recreate the quality and the zany humor of the Looney Tunes classics.

Matt Groening's The Simpsons started in April 1987 as a short segment in-sketch comedy show The Tracey Ullman Show and then launched as a separate prime-time half-hour sitcom in December 1989. It became one of the biggest cartoon hits in history and is the longest-running scripted American primetime television series.

While the successes of The Great Mouse Detective (1986) and Oliver and Company (1988) had already helped to get the Disney studio back on track, they struck gold with the box office record-breaking hit The Little Mermaid (1989). A shot for the rainbow sequence at the end of The Little Mermaid was the first piece of feature animation to be created with the Computer Animation Production System (CAPS) system that Disney and Pixar had collaboratively assembled. This digital ink and paint system replaced the expensive method of inking and coloring cells by hand and provided filmmakers with new creative tools. By 1990, the boom of animated hits was heralded as a comeback that might rival the golden age of cartoons.

=== Adult-oriented theatrical animation in the 1980s ===
Bakshi's rock musical American Pop (1981) was another success, was mostly made with the rotoscope technique in combination with some watercolors, computer graphics, live-action shots, and archival footage. His next film Fire and Ice (1983) was a collaboration with artist Frank Frazetta. It was one of many films in the sword and sorcery genre released after the success of Conan the Barbarian (1982) and The Beastmaster (1982). Critics appreciated the visuals and action sequences, but not its script and the film flopped at the box office. After failing to get several projects off the ground, Bakshi retired for a few years.

The Canadian anthology hit film Heavy Metal (1981) was based on comics published in the popular Heavy Metal magazine and was co-produced by its founder. Mixed reviews thought the film was uneven, juvenile, and sexist. It was eventually followed in 2000 by the poorly received Heavy Metal 2000 and re-imagined as the Netflix series Love, Death & Robots in 2019.

The dark rock opera film Pink Floyd – The Wall (1982) contained 15 minutes worth of animated segments by British cartoonist Gerald Scarfe, who had already designed related artwork for the 1979 album and 1980-81 concert tour. Some of the film's animated material was previously used for the 1979 music video for "Another Brick in the Wall: Part 2" and for the tour. Scarfe had also made animations for Pink Floyd's 1977 In the Flesh tour.

The successful British nuclear disaster film When the Wind Blows (1986) showed hand-drawn characters against real backgrounds, with stop-motion for objects that moved.

The violent post-apocalyptic cyberpunk anime Akira (1988) garnered increased popularity for anime outside Japan and is now widely regarded as a classic.

=== MTV and animated videos ===
MTV launched in 1981 and further popularized the music video medium, which allowed relatively free artistic expression and creative techniques. Many of the most celebrated music videos of the 1980s featured animation, often created with techniques that differed from standard cel animation. For instance, the iconic video for Peter Gabriel's Sledgehammer (1986) featured claymation, pixilation, and stop motion by Aardman Animations and the Brothers Quay.

A-ha's "Take On Me" (1985) famously combined live-action with realistic pencil-drawing animation by Michael Patterson. The video was directed by Steve Barron, who would also direct the groundbreaking computer-animated Dire Straits "Money for Nothing" in the same year. The A-ha video was inspired by Alex Patterson's CalArts graduation film Commuter (1984), which had attracted the attention of Warner Bros. Records executives and would be partly used again for A-ha's Train of Thought video.

Patterson also directed Paula Abdul's Opposites Attract (1989), featuring his animated creation MC Skat Kat.

The Rolling Stones' "The Harlem Shuffle" (1986) featured animated elements directed by Ralph Bakshi and John Kricfalusi, created in a few weeks.

The original Moon landing bumpers on MTV were pulled in early 1986 in the wake of the Challenger disaster MTV then furthered its wild artistic postmodern image with a plethora of experimental ident bumpers, most of them animated. Animators usually went uncredited, but were free to work in their identifiable styles. For instance, Canadian animator Danny Antonucci's anonymously contributed a feature with his Lupo the Butcher character that was allowed to utter his psychotic ramblings.

From around 1987, MTV had their own dedicated animation department and slowly started introducing more animation in between its music-related programming. Bill Plympton's Microtoons is an early example.

=== Rise of computer animation ===
Early experiments with computers to generate (abstract) moving images had been conducted since the 1940s but had not garnered much attention until commercial arcade video games started to get marketed in the early 1970s. Pong (1972) by Atari, Inc., with very simple two-dimensional black-and-white graphics, and Taito's Space Invaders became huge successes that paved the way for a medium that can be regarded as an interactive branch of computer animation. Since 1974, the annual SIGGRAPH convention has been organized to demonstrate developments and new research in the field of computer graphics (including CGI), but computer animation had seldom been seen on TV or in movie theaters (with notable exceptions of some demonstrations of 3D wire-frame models as futuristic technologies seen on screens in a few big Hollywood productions as Futureworld (1976) and Star Wars (1977)).

3D computer animation started to have a much wider cultural impact during the 1980s, demonstrated for instance in the 1982 movie Tron and the music video for Money for Nothing (1985) by the Dire Straits. The concept even spawned a popular faux 3D-animated AI character: Max Headroom (introduced in 1985).

During the 1980s, computer animation also became a relatively common means to create motion graphics for logos and text in TV-commercials and movies title sequences.

== 1990s: The Disney Renaissance and the rise of computer animation ==
=== Disney Renaissance ===
The 1990s saw Disney release numerous films that were both critically and commercially successful, returning to heights not seen since their heyday of the 1930s to 1960s. The period from 1989 to 1999 is now referred to as the Disney Renaissance or the Second Golden Age and began with the release of The Little Mermaid (1989). Their success led other major film studios to establish new animation divisions such as Amblimation, Fox Animation Studios or Warner Bros. Feature Animation to replicate Disney's success by turning their animated films into Disney-styled musicals. The 90s are sometimes referred to as the "Renaissance Age of Animation" for animation as a whole, including both theatrical animated films and cartoon TV series.

Disney's Beauty and the Beast (1991) (the first animated film to be nominated for the Academy Award for Best Picture), Aladdin (1992) and The Lion King (1994) successively broke box-office records. Pocahontas (1995) opened to mixed reviews from critics but was a financial success, it received two Academy Awards and was well received by viewers. Mulan (1998) and Tarzan (1999) did not surpass The Lion King as the highest-grossing (traditionally) animated film of all time but the viewer and financial reception of both films were successful and each grossing over $300 million worldwide. The Hunchback of Notre Dame (1996) was a financial success at the time but contained very dark and adult themes and has since become one of Disney's lesser-known films, although it has a cult following. Only the sequel The Rescuers Down Under (1990) and Hercules (1997) underperformed box-office expectations, but they were both well received amongst the viewers like the other Disney Renaissance films.

From The Return of Jafar in 1994 to Tinker Bell and the Legend of the NeverBeast in 2015, Disney continued to produce feature-length sequels to successful titles, but only as direct-to-video releases by Walt Disney Studios Home Entertainment.

=== Television ===
John Kricfalusi's influential The Ren & Stimpy Show (1991–1996) garnered widespread acclaim. Throughout its initial run, it was the most popular cable TV show in the United States. Although it was programmed as a kids' cartoon on the Nickelodeon network, it was notoriously controversial due to its dark humor, sexual innuendos, adult humor, mature themes, profanity, violence, and shock value. The Ren & Stimpy Show was the third cartoon that premiered together with Doug (1991–1994, 1996–1999) and Rugrats (1991–1994, 1997–2004) on the paid Nickelodeon television channel. Klasky Csupo, the animation studio behind Rugrats, produced and animated era-defining shows for the children's network, in the 1990s and 2000s. Once the studio faded into obscurity in 2008, they were succeeded by Frederator Studios, the studio behind The Fairly OddParents (2001–2006, 2009–2017). Frederator remained active for most of the 2000s and the 2010s, before fading into obscurity by 2017.

Before 1991, Nickelodeon would import cartoons from other channels to their network, which is a practice that remains ongoing. Examples of cartoons imported to Nickelodeon are Angela Anaconda (1999–2001) from Fox Family Channel (with foreign releases), Wayside (2005, 2007–2008), from the Canadian channel of Teletoon and Growing Up Creepie (2006–2008) from Discovery Kids. The most successful imported cartoon to the channel is PAW Patrol (2013–present), from another Canadian network Spin Master, which is on Nickeoldeon's sub-channel Nick Jr., where programs on that station are aimed at toddlers rather than children or teenagers. The most successful cartoon native to Nick Jr. is Dora the Explorer (2000–2019). Years before Nick's heyday in the 90s, Nickelodeon launched the (unaired) pilot of Video Dream Theatre in 1979 or 1980, and it was soon to be followed by two more failed attempts of original animation, which were the aired pilots of Christmas in Tattertown in 1988 and Nick's Thanksgiving Fest in 1989.

While Doug, Rugrats, and The Ren & Stimpy Show, being the three first Nicktoons cartoon superstars in Nicktoons history, Nicktoons releases the very first episode of Rocko's Modern Life on September 18, 1993–1996, 2019). Also, Nicktoons later begins featuring more cartoon shows, including Hey Arnold! (1996–2004, 2017), The Angry Beavers (1997–2001), CatDog (1998-2001/2005) and Rocket Power (1999-2004). Initially the long-running Nicktoon Rugrats was the flagship franchise of Nickelodeon before being surpassed by SpongeBob SquarePants (1999–present) in 2004 when the network rebranded itself with the release of the first SpongeBob film. Similar to The Ren & Stimpy Show, SpongeBob SquarePants had sexual innuendos, adult humor, mature themes, dark humor, violence, and shock value.

On September 13, 1993, Fox Kids aired the first episode of Animaniacs (1993–1998, 2020–2023) and in 1999 an Animaniacs film called Wakko's Wish was released. The immense success of The Simpsons (1989–present) prompted more original and relatively daring adult-oriented animated cartoon show series, including South Park (1997–present), King of the Hill (1997–2010), Family Guy (1999–present), and Futurama (1999–2003, 2008–2013, 2023–present).

The use of animation on MTV increased as the channel started to make more shows that did not fit the "music television" moniker. Liquid Television (1991–1995) showcased contributions that were mostly created by independent animators specifically for the show and spawned the separate shows Æon Flux (1991–1995), Beavis and Butt-Head (1993–1997) as well as Daria (1997–2002). Other 1990s cartoon series on MTV included The Head (1994–1996) and The Maxx (1995), both under the MTV's Oddities banner. By 2001, MTV closed its animation department, began to outsource its animated series, and eventually imported shows from associated networks.

Warner Bros.' 24-hour cable channel Cartoon Network was launched in the United States on October 1, 1992, and was soon followed by its international versions. Originally the programming consisted of classic cartoons from the back catalogs of Warner Bros, MGM, Fleischer/Famous, and Hanna-Barbera. From 1996 to 2003, new original series ran as Cartoon Cartoons and included the popular titles Dexter's Laboratory (1996–2003), Johnny Bravo (1997–2004), Cow and Chicken (1997–1999), I Am Weasel (1997–2000), The Powerpuff Girls (1998–2005), Ed, Edd n Eddy (1999–2009), and Courage the Cowardly Dog (1999–2002).

Television animation for children also continued to flourish in the United States on other specialized cable channels like Disney Channel/Disney XD, PBS Kids, and in syndicated afternoon time slots. Examples of animated Disney cartoons in the 90s are TaleSpin (1990–1991), Darkwing Duck (1991–1992), Goof Troop (1992, 1995, 2000), Bonkers (1993–1994), Aladdin (1994–1995, 1996), Gargoyles (1994–1997), Timon & Pumbaa (1995–1999), 101 Dalmatians (1997–1998), Pepper Ann (1997–2000), and Disney's Recess (1997–2001, 2003).

The Disney Channel (owned by Disney Branded Television), Nickelodeon (owned by Viacom, now known as Paramount Skydance), and Cartoon Network (owned by Warner Bros. Animation) dominated the animated television industry. These three channels are considered to be the "Big Three" of children's entertainment.

=== Breakthrough of computer animation and new media ===
During the 1990s, 3D animation became more and more mainstream, especially in video games, and eventually had a big breakthrough in 1995 with Pixar's feature film hit Toy Story.

More or less photo-realistic 3D animation has been used for special effects in some commercials and films since the 1980s before breakthrough effects were seen in Terminator 2: Judgment Day (1991) and Jurassic Park (1993). Since then, techniques have developed to the stage that the difference between CGI and real-life cinematography is seldom obvious. Filmmakers can blend both types of images seamlessly with virtual cinematography. The Matrix (1999) and its two sequels are usually regarded as breakthrough films in this field.

The creation of virtual worlds allows real-time animation in virtual reality, a medium that has been experimented with since 1962 and started to see commercial entertainment applications in the 1990s.

The launch of the World Wide Web increased interest in motion graphics and computer animation, spawning many new applications, techniques, and markets for what became known as new media.

== 2000s–present: The rise of digital animation ==
A motion capture system for character animation

After the success of Pixar's Toy Story (1995) and DreamWorks Animation's Shrek (2001), computer animation grew into the dominant animation technique in the US and many other countries. Even animation that looked traditional was often created fully with computers, helped by for instance cel-shading techniques to replicate the desired look of traditional animation (true real-time cel-shading was first introduced in 2000 by Sega's Jet Set Radio for their Dreamcast console). By 2004, only small productions were still created with traditional techniques.

The first decades of the 21st century also saw 3D film turn mainstream in theatres. The production process and visual style of CGI lend themselves perfectly to 3D viewing, much more than traditional animation styles and methods. However, many traditionally animated films can be very effective in 3D. Disney successfully released a 3D version of The Lion King in 2011, followed by Beauty and the Beast in 2012. A planned 3D version of The Little Mermaid was canceled when Beauty and the Beast and two 3D-converted Pixar titles were not successful enough at the box office.

=== Disney and Pixar ===
Disney started producing their own 3D-style computer-animated features with Dinosaur and Chicken Little, but continued to make animated features with traditional look: The Emperor's New Groove (2000), Atlantis: The Lost Empire (2001), Lilo & Stitch (2002), Treasure Planet (2002), Brother Bear (2003) and Home on the Range (2004).

Treasure Planet and Home on the Range were big flops on big budgets and it looked like Disney would only continue with 3D computer animation. Financial analysis in 2006 proved that Disney had lost money on their animation productions in the previous ten years. In the meantime, Pixar's CGI features did extremely well. To turn things around Disney acquired Pixar in 2006, and put creative control over both Pixar and Walt Disney Animation Studios in the hands of Pixar's John Lasseter as part of the deal. The studios would remain separate legal entities. Under Lasseter, the Disney studio developed both traditionally styled and 3D-styled animation projects.

The theatrical short How to Hook Up Your Home Theater (2007) tested whether new paperless animation processes could be used for a look similar to cartoons of the 1940s and 1950s, with Goofy returning to his "Everyman" role in his first solo appearance in 42 years.

Ron Clements and John Musker's feature The Princess and the Frog (2009) was a moderate commercial and critical success, but not the comeback hit for traditional features that the studio had hoped it would be. Its perceived failure was mostly blamed on the use of "princess" in the title causing potential movie-goers to think it was only for little girls, and old-fashioned.

Winnie the Pooh (2011) received favorable reviews, but failed at the box office and was Disney's most recent traditional feature to date, though the studio has stated in 2019 and 2023 that they are open to proposals from filmmakers for future hand-drawn feature projects. Frozen (2013) was originally conceived in the traditional style but switched to 3D CGI to enable the creation of certain required visual elements. It became Disney's biggest hit at the time, surpassing both The Lion King and Pixar's Toy Story 3 as the highest-grossing animated film of all time, and winning the studio's first Academy Award for a best-animated feature.

=== Anime ===
Hand-drawn animation continued to be very popular outside of the US, most notably in Japan, where traditionally styled anime remained the dominant technique. The popularity of anime continued to rise domestically, with a record-high 340 anime series airing on television in 2015, as well as internationally, with a dedicated Toonami block on Cartoon Network (1997–2008) and Adult Swim (since 2012) and with streaming services like Netflix and Amazon Prime licensing and producing an increasing amount of anime.

Studio Ghibli continued its enormous success with Miyazaki's Spirited Away (2001), ハウルの動く城 (Howl's Moving Castle) (2004), 崖の上のポニョ (Ponyo) (2008) and 風立ちぬ (The Wind Rises) (2013) and Hiromasa Yonebayashi借りぐらしのアリエッティ(The Secret World of Arrietty) (2010), all grossing more than $100 million worldwide and appearing in the top 20 of the highest-grossing anime films of all time (as of 2024). Takahata's かぐや姫の物語 (The Tale of the Princess Kaguya) (2013) was nominated for an Oscar for Best Animated Feature Film and many other awards.

Makoto Shinkai directed 君の名は。(Your Name) (2016, highest-grossing anime film of all time internationally) and 天気の子 (Weathering with You) (2019).

=== The Big Three in the 21st century ===
The 21st century Nicktoons included Invader Zim (2001–2006, 2019), Jimmy Neutron (2001, 2002–2006), ChalkZone (2002–2008), Avatar: The Last Airbender (2005–2008), and Catscratch (2005–2007), Back at the Barnyard (2006, 2007–2011), The Mighty B! (2008-2011), Avatar's spin-off series The Legend of Korra (2012–2014), Harvey Beaks (2015–2017), Pig Goat Banana Cricket (2015–2018), It's Pony (2020–2022), Glitch Techs (2020), Middlemost Post (2021–2022), Star Trek: Prodigy (2021–2022), Big Nate (2022–2024), Rock Paper Scissors (2024–2026), and Wylde Pak (2025–present).

Examples of CN cartoons of the 21st century are Samurai Jack (2001–2004, 2017), Codename: Kids Next Door (2002–2008), Teen Titans (2003–2006), Foster's Home for Imaginary Friends (2004–2009), Ben 10 (2005–2008), The Marvelous Misadventures of Flapjack (2008–2010), Adventure Time (2010–2018), Regular Show (2010–2017), The Amazing World of Gumball (2011–2019), and Steven Universe (2013–2019).

Following the Disney Renaissance, Disney has produced Kim Possible (2002–2006, 2007), Phineas and Ferb (2007–present), Gravity Falls (2012–2016), Star vs. the Forces of Evil (2015–2019), The Lion Guard (2016–2019), DuckTales (2017–2021), Big City Greens (2018–present), Amphibia (2019–2022), The Owl House (2020–2023), and Monsters at Work (2021–2024).

== Stop motion ==
After pioneering work by the likes of J. Stuart Blackton, Segundo de Chomón, and Arthur Melbourne-Cooper, stop motion became a branch of animation that has been much less dominant than hand-drawn animation and computer animation. Nonetheless, there have been many successful stop-motion films and television series. Among the animators whose work with animated puppets has received the highest acclaim are Wladyslaw Starewicz, George Pal, and Henry Selick. Popular titles using animated clay include Gumby (1955), Mio Mao (1970), The Red and the Blue (1976), Plonsters (1987–1997), Foxy Fables (1989), Pingu (1990–2000) and many Aardman Animations productions (Morph (1977) and Wallace and Gromit (1989)).

In the hands of influential filmmakers such as Jan Svankmajer and Brothers Quay, stop motion has been regarded as a highly artistic medium.

Until largely replaced by computer-animated effects, stop motion was also a popular technique for special effects in live-action films. Pioneer Willis O'Brien and his protégé Ray Harryhausen animated many monsters and creatures for live-action Hollywood films, using models or puppets with armatures. In comparison, hand-drawn animation has relatively often been combined with live-action, but usually in an obvious fashion and often used as a surprising gimmick that combines a "real" world and a fantasy or dream world. Only rarely has hand-drawn animation been used as convincing special effects (for instance in the climax of Highlander (1986)).

== Cutout animation ==
Cutout techniques were relatively often used in animated films until cel animation became the standard method (at least in the United States). The earliest animated feature films, by Quirino Cristiani and Lotte Reiniger, were cutout animations.

Before 1934, Japanese animation mostly used cutout techniques rather than cel animation, because celluloid was too expensive.

As cutouts often have been hand-drawn and some productions combine several animation techniques, cutout animation can sometimes look very similar to hand-drawn traditional animation.

While sometimes used as a simple and cheap animation method in children's programs (for instance in Ivor the Engine), cutout animation has remained a relatively artistic and experimental medium in the hands of filmmakers like Harry Everett Smith, Terry Gilliam, John Korty and Jim Blashfield.

Today, cutout-style animation is frequently produced using computers, with scanned images or vector graphics taking the place of physically cut materials. South Park is a notable example of the transition since its pilot episode was made with paper cutouts before switching to computer software. Similar stylistic choices and blends with different techniques in computer animation have made it harder to differentiate between "traditional", cutout, and Flash animation styles.

== Other developments by region ==
=== Americas ===
==== History of Cuban animation ====
- 1970: Juan Padrón creates the character of Elpidio Valdés, the star of a long-running series of shorts and two motion pictures.
- 1992: An animation category is added to the Festival Internacional del Nuevo Cine Latinoamericano.

==== History of Mexican animation ====
- 1935: Alfonso Vergara produces Paco Perico en premier, an animated short film.
- 1974: Fernando Ruiz produces Los tres Reyes Magos, Mexico's first animated feature-length film.
- 1977: Anuar Badin creates the film Los supersabios, based on the comic.
- 1983: Roy del espacio

=== Europe ===
==== History of Italian animation ====
- 1977: The classic Allegro Non Troppo, a parody/homage to Disney's Fantasia is director Bruno Bozzetto's most ambitious work and his third feature-length animation, after the Spaghetti Western West and Soda and the superhero parody VIP my Brother Superman, and after several notable shorts (including Mr. Rossi and the Oscar-nominated Grasshoppers (Cavallette)).

==== History of animation in Croatia (in former Yugoslavia) ====
- 1953: Zagreb Film inaugurates the Zagreb school of animation.
- 1975: Škola Animiranog Filma Čakovec (ŠAF) inaugurates the Čakovec school of animation.

== Media ==
A 1921 sequel to Winsor McCay's "Gertie the Dinosaur", 1914, the first cartoon with personality animation

== See also ==
- Firsts in animation
- History of anime
- History of art
- History of Cartoon Network
- History of comics
- History of Disney Channel
- History of film
- History of manga
- History of Nickelodeon
- History of television
- History of video games
- History of YouTube
