= Clark Haas =

American cartoonist

Clark S. Haas Jr. (July 21, 1919 – January 18, 1978) was an American cartoonist and, from 1957 to 1965, owner of Cambria Studios, which produced the limited animation series Clutch Cargo (1959).

== Career ==
Before working professionally in cartoons, Haas was a pioneer jet pilot, according to Cambria Studios voice actress Margaret Kerry. His cartooning career started with work on the Sunday editions of the comic strips Buz Sawyer and Tim Tyler's Luck. From 1949 to 1951, he had his own comic strip, Sunnyside, which was distributed by Wheeler-Nicholson, Inc.

After starting Cambria Studios, he helped create and write Cambria's animated television series, Clutch Cargo (1959–1960), Space Angel (1962), Captain Fathom (1965), and The New Three Stooges (1965–1966). The first three of these series used the Syncro-Vox technique of animation developed by his Cambria partner, Edwin Gillette, in the early 1950s for producing animation quickly and at a minimal cost.

In later years Haas became associated with Hanna-Barbera and worked on their series The ABC Saturday Superstar Movie (1972), Super Friends (1973), and Speed Buggy (1973).
