= Hallo aus Berlin =

British educational television series created for beginning German speakers

- Genre: Educational television
- Directed by: Scott Ross
- Composers: Sandy Nuttgens, Mike Scott
- Country of origin: United Kingdom
- Original language: German
- No. of episodes: 11

Production
- Executive producer: Len Brown
- Producer: Ronald Smedley
- Running time: 14 minutes
- Production companies: Goethe-Institut; BBC Schools

Original release
- Network: BBC Schools
- Release: 19 September 1996 – 27 March 1997

Hallo aus Berlin (English: Hello from Berlin) is a British educational television series co-produced by the BBC and the Goethe-Institut. It is produced in a "magazine" style with reports, interviews, music, and animated sequences, aimed at beginner German speakers from ages 4–18.

The series 10 episodes aired in the BBC Schools strand from 19 September 1996. It has been used as a German teaching aid in the United Kingdom, the United States, the Republic of Ireland, Canada, France, Monaco, Italy, San Marino, the Czech Republic, Denmark, Norway, Sweden, Finland, Iceland, Hungary, Poland, the Netherlands, Slovakia, Romania, Ukraine, Greece, Cyprus, Israel, Saudi Arabia, India, and Australia.

The main characters are Marko Walther, Jessica König, Daniel Augustin, Esther Walk, Thomas Lindel and Miriam Casten, a group of young people who introduce the audience to everyday life in Berlin. An animated sketch and song performed by the host characters, Rolli Schmidt and Rita Weiß, appears in every episode except for the eleventh and last episode, "Unser Berlin".

== Episodes ==
Episode number	Title	Title in English	Overview
0	"Demo-Band"	Demo-Band	The episode provides details and ideas on how a teacher could use the show to teach students German with clips of the episodes and a voiceover. Some song snippets are used, but no skits.
1	"Wir"	"We"	The characters in the series are introduced. Their looks, heights and ages are described, then Rolli und Rita are introduced. Their first sketch has the characters introduce themselves before exploring a hall of mirrors in a fairground and describe colors and facial features in German, ending with them getting scared away by a coffin ghost in the haunted house. After Rolli asks the locals on what they like to do, Thomas then describes his enjoyment of cycling, Daniel shows his drawings, and Jessica goes shopping; Marko then shows us his guinea pig, Schnuffi, and Miriam talks about her pet dog. Esther is seen partaking in athletics and describes what she does. Rolli und Rita perform the song "Hallo aus Berlin" ("Hello from Berlin").
2	"Familie"	"Family"	Daniel and his family visit his grandparents. The other characters introduce their brothers and sisters, as well as their pets, after a few interviews with local Berliners. Thomas goes to the Berlin Zoological Garden and introduces the different animals that are seen there. Rolli und Rita's sketch shows Rita with a snake named Zischer at Rolli's house that can perform mathematical calculations; Zischer becomes confused and wrecks the room after Rolli asks a question it couldn't handle. Rolli und Rita then attempt to piece together the broken family portraits, mismatching pieces with different family members, and they fail to do so by the time Rolli's mother arrives. Nada is introduced, a 17-year-old who lives independently from his parents in a flat with other young people, and he describes the chores and jobs he does at home. Rolli und Rita perform the song "Das ist meine Familie" ("This is My Family"). Daniel is then seen at his grandparents' house, feeling bored.
3	"Zu Hause"	"At Home"	Marko describes his house. Miriam has breakfast with her family and describes typical breakfast foodstuffs. After a few vox-pop interviews, Rolli does his morning routine in the sketch and forgets to complete his chores before his mother returns home. Marko describes his wardrobe and some of his clothes, and leaves for school. The different types of houses in Berlin are described, and Jessica and Daniel give their addresses. Some homeless people are seen being served food in a canteen in central Berlin, then Esther visits Jessica's house, where they talk about Take That and listen to CDs. Rolli und Rita perform the song "Wo Wohnst Du?" ("Where Do You Live?").
4	"In der Stadt"	"In The City"	Wolfgang, Jessica's cousin, is shown alighting from an Intercity Express train and travelling to Jessica's house. He briefly converses with Jessica and her mother on a payphone, and plans to go to a soccer match with Jessica, before taking the U-Bahn. Thomas meets a fellow Star Trek fan at a shop, and they head off together, before planning to go to the same soccer match Wolfgang plans to go to. Wolfgang then gets lost and asks a local for help, only to be presented with a lengthy set of directions. In Rolli und Rita's sketch Rita contacts Rolli over his cell phone, instructing him to go to the cinema and then the disco, before inadvertently finding himself atop an under-construction building. Thomas and his friend and purchase food, and Daniel, Miriam, Marko and Esther are asked for directions within Berlin (when Miriam and Esther are asked, a female voice could be heard, implying that the presenter was to be a woman). Wolfgang is still lost and calls Jessica again, and she comes to meet him. Rolli und Rita perform the song "Ist Eine Post Hier?" ("Is There a Post Office Here?"). We then see Thomas, his friend, Jessica and Wolfgang going to the Olympiastadion, and the soccer game, which is between Borussia Mönchengladbach and VfL Wolfsburg, takes place as the credits roll.
5	"Essen und Trinken"	"Food and Drinks"	Thomas goes grocery shopping for his aunt Elizabeth; meanwhile, Miriam and Jessica take a trip to a McDonald's. After shopping Thomas and his aunt visit a café for some ice cream and cake. Rolli und Rita try cooking pancakes at home in the sketch, which ends in disaster when Rita covers the kitchen with whipped cream. A Turkish market and some traditional Turkish cuisine are seen. Rolli and Rita perform the song "Einmal Eis, Bitte" ("One Ice Cream, Please").
6	"Schule"	"School"	Jessica and Marko introduce their schools, and various lessons can be seen. Lunch break activities are shown. A boy named Arno is caught smoking under-age (before 2007 the minimum age for smoking in Germany was 16 years) and is sent to the headmaster's office. He is ordered to clean the smoking-corner of the school as punishment meanwhile, an English lesson is seen. Rolli und Rita's sketch involves Rolli not doing his homework, and Rita appearing on a nearby computer to assist him, with her choosing all of the wrong answers, ending with them running away from the teacher. Some students complain to Esther, the class representative, that they are receiving too much German homework; Esther addresses the issue with their German teacher, Ms. Notte. Jessica introduces the after school clubs (Arbeitsgemeinschaften). A montage is seen of various after-school activities, then Rolli und Rita perform the song "Was ist dein Lieblingsfach" ("What Is Your Favourite Subject"). After the song the headmaster is shown leaving. Note: This is the first episode to exclude the vox-pop segment.
7	"Freizeit"	"Free Time"	The kids are seen discussing their plans for the weekend. Miriam describes her horse and demonstrates how she rides and cares for it. Arno is seen sleeping, whilst Daniel, Thomas and Esther meet in a music shop. Jessica is seen doing ballet. Rolli und Rita's sketch has them causing havoc in a music shop with expensive musical instruments. A traditional Turkish festival is seen, and the main characters are seen dancing at a night club. Rolli und Rita perform the song "Was machst du am Wochenende?" ("What are You Doing This Weekend?").
8	"Gesundheit"	"Fitness"	Marko is playing volleyball and injures his foot; meanwhile, Esther warms up and does athletics. Healthy and unhealthy foods and habits are discussed. Marko sees a doctor for his injuries and is examined. In the sketch, Rolli und Rita decide to go bowling in their sketch, only to end in disaster. Jessica, Marko, and Esther describe their favorite sports. Karate lessons are seen, and Thomas, Daniel and Miriam describe their favorite activities. Some children in wheelchairs are seen playing basketball, and Rolli und Rita perform the song "Ich habe zehn Finger" ("I Have Ten Fingers"). The characters are then seen at an indoor water park.
9	"Ferien und Feste"	"Holidays and Celebrations"	Daniel's mother books hotel rooms at a hotel in Binz, where the family are going on holiday. A Turkish girl named Elvan talks about Bayram, and Jessica has her Confirmation at a church, heavily implied to be the Saint Nicholas Church. Miriam is then seen celebrating her 14th birthday with her family, Thomas, and Jessica. Rolli und Rita are at the beach in their sketch, oblivious to the signs of a storm, before they get struck by lightning. Daniel is seen with his family writing a letter to his grandparents on the Baltic Sea coast, and they go on a boat ride a day after Daniel writes the letter. Rolli und Rita perform the song "Wann hast du Geburtstag?" ("When Is Your Birthday?").
10	"Unser Berlin"	"Our Berlin"	The last episode of the series shows many of the cultural aspects of Berlin. Jessica explores the shops of Berlin and the KaDeWe. Thomas explains the history of the Kaiser Wilhelm Memorial Church, a reminder of World War II, and Daniel eats in a Berlin restaurant. Esther talks about her local area, Kreuzberg, exploring its shops and restaurants. Marko explains the history of the Berlin Wall, then describes the (then new) plans for the Potsdamer Platz redevelopment. The characters say farewell in a theme park, and Rolli und Rita perform the song "Das ist unser Berlin" ("This Is Our Berlin"), ending the series.

== Rolli and Rita ==
Rolli Schmidt (15) and Rita Weiß (14) are teenagers who appear in every episode of the series, performing a sketch and a song. Rolli also appears in the opening titles of the show.

They were described as "state of the art" at the time of the series' original airing in 1996. Independent producers Baxter Hobbins Slides developed a 3D motion-capture system, which was used to animate the characters. This consisted of motion sensor equipped suits, allowing the movements of actors to be mapped to the 3D models. A real-time wireframe animated model of the characters could then be produced, after which skin and clothes were added. The lip movements of the characters were achieved by utilising the real lip movements of actors filmed against a blue screen.

The sketches were later redubbed in French and Spanish for Quinze Minutes Plus (Juju et Juliette) and Revista (Julio y Julia).

A sketch is known within the fandom for having been removed from the episode "Unser Berlin" due to tonal inconsistency. The segment originally featured Rita experiencing a breakout of pimples, with Rolli offering her a remedy that induces surreal hallucinations and causes her skin to turn green. It was ultimately cut from the episode over concerns that it could be interpreted as a depiction of drug use, as well as the fact that both characters were portrayed as being past the typical age for puberty-related issues. Despite its removal from the original broadcast, the sketch appeared on Quinze Minutes Plus and Revista.

Rolli was voiced by Fredrick Ruth (credited as Frido Ruth), and Rita was voiced by Nina Hamm, while her singing voice was done by Christina Fry, a professional actress, singer, comedian and writer.
