= Edwin Gillette =

American cameraman & inventor (1909-2003)

Edwin Gillette (August 11, 1909, in Chicago – September 30, 2003, in Los Angeles) was a cameraman and inventor notable for the development of the Syncro-Vox technique of limited animation, which was used in the series Clutch Cargo.

== Early life ==
Born to a Chicago architect, Gillette grew up in Pasadena, California, graduated in 1929 from the Phillips Exeter Academy in New Hampshire, and studied engineering at Stanford University. His interest in film led to his first job in the entertainment field at Paramount Studios, where he was Preston Sturges' secretary. After producing training films as an officer with the Army Air Corps in World War II, he returned to take a degree in cinema at USC.

== Career ==
Gillette developed the Syncro-Vox technique of animation which was first used in "talking animal" commercials of the early 1950s. He filed a patent for the technique in 1952, and obtained patent #2,739,505 for it on March 27, 1956.

After working as the undersea cinematographer on the 1957 film Undersea Girl, he joined Clark Haas' Cambria Studios, where Syncro-Vox was put to use in their animated series Clutch Cargo (1959), Space Angel (1962) and Captain Fathom (1965). He retired as a partner in Cambria Studios in 1964.
