= Captain Fathom =

1965 animated television series

Captain Fathom is an American animated television series produced in 1965 by Cambria Studios. Like Cambria's other productions, Clutch Cargo and Space Angel, it was produced in Synchro-Vox. At least 26 30-minute episodes, all in color, were filmed. The episodes could be broken down into five 5-minute segments in cliffhanger format. Renowned comic book artist Alex Toth was the director.

This animated series was broadcast in Italy in syndication in the early 1980s under two different titles: Avventure negli abissi (that means in English Adventures in the Abyss) and Captain Fathom. This was the last Cambria Studios cartoon show to use the Syncro-Vox.

An attempt at airing a live-action version of Captain Fathom was done in 1955 starring Don Megowan, Richard H. Cutting, and Barbara Wilson. The pilot wasn't purchased by a network and was never aired.

== Plot ==
Captain Bill Fathom was captain of a submarine called the Argonaut. It was named after the Argonauts of Greek mythology. Fathom and his crew would have various adventures, similar to those of Clutch Cargo or Jonny Quest.

== Episodes ==
1. A Man Called Guppy
2. The Loss of the Argonaut (episodes 5–10)
3. Mission: Thunder Fire Island (episodes 11–15)
4. One for the Money, One for the Show
5. The Ice Trap (episodes 31–35)
6. Wanted Dead or Alive
7. The Light That Wailed
8. The Underseas Land Grab
9. The Shrieking Mountain (episodes 46–50)
10. Find a Hidden Prize (episodes 51–55)
11. The Pirates of Global Island
12. Pursuit of the Dinopisces
13. The Sub-Enchanted Garden (episodes 71–75)
14. Rustlers of the Sea Range (episodes 76–80)
15. Voyage to the Stone Age (episodes 81–85)
16. The Baron of Shark Island (episodes 86–90)
17. Ghost Ship (episodes 91–95)
18. The Whale and W.P. (episodes 96–100)
19. The Eye of the Mountain (episodes 111–115)
20. Xerog (episodes 116–120)
21. Project Meec
22. Phantom of Port Royal
23. Seldom Seem Sea Serpent
24. Deep Marauder
25. U-2 Rudolph
26. Pisastro's Private War (episodes 171–175)

== See also ==
- List of underwater science fiction works
