= Space Angel =

American animated science fiction television series

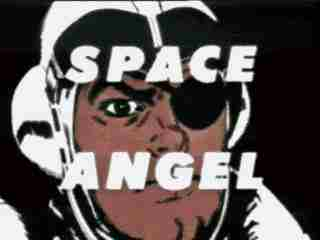
- Genre: Science fiction
- Written by: Clark Haas; Dick Darley
- Directed by: Dick Darley; Alex Toth
- Country of origin: United States
- Original language: English

Production
- Producers: Dick Brown; Dick Darley; Clark Haas
- Cinematography: Edwin Gillette
- Running time: 30 minutes
- Production company: Cambria Productions

Space Angel is an American animated science fiction television series airing from early 1962 through 1964. It used the same Synchro-Vox lip technique as Clutch Cargo, the first cartoon produced by the same studio, Cambria Productions. The show was created by Dick Darley, who also created the 1950–1955 live-action series Space Patrol.

The series chronicled the adventures of three astronauts who worked for the Earth Bureau of Investigation's Interplanetary Space Force on board the spaceship Starduster: Captain/Pilot Scott McCloud, also known as "the Space Angel" (voiced by Ned Lefebver), Electronics/Communications expert Crystal Mace (voiced by Margaret Kerry), and the immensely strong Scottish-born Gunner/Engineer Taurus (voiced by Hal Smith).

== Setting and themes ==
The character name the Space Angel was a secret identity. Scott McCloud had an eyepatch; when he appeared as Space Angel, he would lower the dark-tinted visor on his helmet to conceal his identity.

Apart from the use of Synchro-Vox, animation was very limited, but the static panel art by the renowned Alex Toth was often well-drawn. Story lines were serialized over five episodes which ran 5 minutes each, the idea being that stations could show one episode per weekday, with the climax coming on Friday. Cliffhangers were sometimes used, as in an episode with McCloud finding a derelict spacecraft beyond the light barrier, looking inside and exclaiming "Oh, my God!" Another memorable sequence occurred with the heroes involved in a best two-of-three gladiator battle, using future visions of Roman combat.

There were several episodes involving space combat between the Interplanetary Space Force and various enemies. After the Space Angel and his crew had discovered the villains' plans or forces, he would call in reinforcements made up of one or more squadrons of the ISF. Squadrons were organized by planetary patrol areas such as the Venusian Squadron, Mars Squadron, etc. The identifying squadron symbols on the ISF ships were the ones used in astronomy charts of the time to identify the planets, such as the female symbol for the Venusian Squadron, the male symbol for the Mars Squadron and a circle with an enclosed plus sign for the Earth Squadron.

The main antagonists in the show were the Anthenians, who were modelled on a combination of Ancient Rome and Sparta; their home planet is shown in the episode involving the gladiatorial games. The city looks like Rome, including a Colosseum. The civilians are dressed in togas and the soldiers are wearing a combination of Greek/Roman armor with Corinthian-style helmets. They are armed with blaster rifles.

Another antagonist is Zorra, the Evil Queen of Space, who resembled Nefertiti, and her henchmen, "the General" and "the Major", who all spoke with Central European accents. Predating the Star Trek episode "Balance of Terror", their claim to fame is an invisible spaceship they use to disrupt interstellar trade.

In the opening sequence of "Space Hijackers (Solar Mirror)" a delta-winged spacecraft, the Starduster, docks with a space station. The ship matches velocity and rotation with the station and is talked in with instrument assist. This sequence foreshadows the space dock sequence of the delta-winged Orion from Stanley Kubrick's 2001: A Space Odyssey, which would be made seven years later.

The Starduster contains a smaller vessel, a space fighter flown by the Space Angel, which looks like the XF-92 and is about the same size, though with a pointed nose. It is called the "Space Dart".

The first season theme music is credited to Geordie Hormel. The second season theme music was written by Walter Greene and was originally used in Roger Corman's film War of the Satellites (1958).

== Episodes ==
There are 52 Space Angel stories, each in five parts, totaling 260 episodes.

List of Space Angel stories
Title	Episodes
Space Hijackers (Solar Mirror)	1–5
The Little People	6–10
The Wizard of Eden	11–15
Incident of the Loud Planet	16–20
Expedition to a New Moon	21–25
Cosmic Combat	26–30
The Gladiators	31–35
The Light Barrier	36–40
The Slave World	41–45
The Exiles	46–50
The Saucer Caper	51–55
Death of a Galaxy	56–60
There Goes Danny	61–65
Visitors from Outer Space	66–70
Rescue Mission	71–75
Space War	76–80
Dragon Fire	81–85
Flight of Hotshots	86–90
The Fugitives	91–95
The Encoder	96–100
Project Hero	101–105
The Frozen Planet	106–110
The Plagued Planet	111–115
The Donavan Plan	116–120
Cosmic Search	121–125
The Plot	126–130
Name, Rank, and Serial Number	131–135
Crystal's Anti Boy Friend	136–140
They Went Thatta' Way	141–145
Power Failure	146–150
Scratch One Chimp	151–155
Red Alert	156–160
The Day the Earth Went Dark	161–165
The Queen of the Three Suns	166–170
Once Upon a Rainbow	171–175
Welcome, Neighbor	176–180
Space Angel Meets a Devil	181–185
Top Secret	186–190
How To Win a Space Race Without Really Trying	191–195
The Gold City Blues	196–200
The Not So Mythical Beast	201–205
Count Down	206–210
The Abominable Moon Man	211–215
Dr. Kinkaid, I Presume	216–220
Crisis in Orbit	221–225
The Great Plain Robbery	226–230
Take Me to Your Leader	231–235
The Ghost and Crystal Mace	236–240
The National Bank Chase	241–245
Big Bertha Makes Peace	246–250
Gopher Broke	251–255
Conflict Nola	256–260

== Space Angel in other media ==
Alex Toth drew a Space Angel six-page story for children's magazine Jack & Jill in 1963 to promote the Space Angel cartoon.

Transogram released a board game in 1965 simply entitled Space Angel Game.

The episode "The Gladiators" was featured on Cinema Insomnia.

VCI Entertainment released a DVD that contained nine Space Angel stories in July 2008.
