= Limited animation =

Animation technique

A GIF-based example of limited animation in the Japanese style: the mouth, eyes, arms and shadow are moving in a looping manner.

Limited animation (or planned animation) is a process in the overall technique of traditional animation that reuses frames of character animation.

== Early history ==
The use of budget-cutting and time-saving measures in animation date back to the earliest commercial animation, including cycled animations, mirror-image and symmetrical drawings, still characters, and other labor-saving methods. In general, the progression was from early productions in which every frame was drawn by hand, independent of each other drawing, toward more limited animation that made use of the same drawings in different ways.

Winsor McCay, a man who put an unprecedented amount of detail into his animations, boasted that in his 1914 film, Gertie the Dinosaur, everything moved, including the rocks and blades of grass in the background. In contrast, his 1918 film The Sinking of the Lusitania progressed to using cels over still backgrounds, while still maintaining a level of detail comparable to that of Gertie.

The Dover Boys, an early example of limited animation

The 1942 Merrie Melodies cartoon The Dover Boys at Pimento University, directed by Chuck Jones, is one of the earliest Warner Bros. cartoons to extensively employ some of the processes of what would become known as "limited animation", particularly its use of characters that either stand still or move so quickly that the actual motion appears to be a blur. This animation technique, an exaggeration of the established practice of squash and stretch, has come to be known as the smear frame.

== Countries ==
=== United States ===
An episode of Colonel Bleep, a 1957 animated serial that relied extensively on limited animation

Hanna-Barbera Productions used limited animation throughout its existence. When the company's namesakes, William Hanna and Joseph Barbera, separated from the MGM studio in 1957, they opted to take a drastically different approach to animation than they had for their fully animated short films; as television screens were much smaller than theater screens at the time, limited animation, with its emphasis on character close-ups and dialogue-based humor, was a better fit for the more intimate home viewer experience. At the time, most feature films (along with animated shorts, including Hanna and Barbera's own work on Tom and Jerry) were transitioning to the widescreen CinemaScope process, which made it more difficult to replicate intimacy; The Walt Disney Company, though they continued to use full animation, had also used character close-ups and personality-driven humor in their early films. When Disney produced Lady and the Tramp in CinemaScope, the process made it difficult to replicate that style, a problem that Hanna-Barbera did not have with smaller, more square television screens.

The infamous silhouette animation of the Three Stooges was used many times at the end of several episodes of their animated input as one of the examples of limited animation.

The financial benefits of limited animation led to television animation companies relying on the process extensively in the television era. Jay Ward Productions relied on limited animation for those reasons, compensating with its heavy Cold War satire and a style of deadpan comedy that would become a trademark of the studio's style. One of the frequent users of limited animation was HB's Saturday-morning rival Filmation (makers of He-Man and the Masters of the Universe and BraveStarr) which gave their work a distinct look. Bill Melendez used a form of limited animation to adapt the Peanuts franchise to television and later film; in addition to the cost and time concerns (especially for his first special A Charlie Brown Christmas, which was given only a $76,000 budget and four months to produce 30 minutes of animation), Meléndez also noted that Peanuts creator Charles M. Schulz had designed the characters with a flat style well-suited for limited animation. The short-lived Cambria Studios turned out three serials (including Clutch Cargo) using one of the most inexpensive approaches to animation possible: known as Syncro-Vox, it involved superimposing film of the voice actor's moving lips over a still frame of the character. Disney themselves resorted to some limited animation tricks in an effort to cut its budget during the 1960s, particularly with its usage of xerography in One Hundred and One Dalmatians, which resulted in artwork with heavier, rougher outlines than had been seen in Disney films to that point.

By the 1970s, the usage of limited animation in Saturday morning cartoons had become pervasive. Walter Williams, creator of The Mr. Bill Show, noted that cartoons in the 1970s were so static, he expected the artist's hands to enter the screen at any moment and physically start moving the drawings around. This inspired him to create the "Mr. Hands" character in The Mr. Bill Show, who literally did just that.

=== Japan ===
Limited animation proved to be particularly popular in Japan, such that the Japanese word for animation, anime, entered the English lexicon as a loanword for the distinctive style of Japanese animation that took root there. Anime features scenes of mouth moving with occasional eye blinks, rendered long shots of detailed backgrounds, a low frame rate (especially in earlier productions) and rare use of 2D fluidity on motion-blur filled action alongside reused drawings, using style conventions from Japanese comic books (manga). It also has the benefit of lower cost productions and stylized content as opposed to realistic animation. As was the case in the United States, television was a major impetus for the growth of anime in Japan; the country's recovery from World War II led to economic prosperity and a boom in Japanese television ownership, and the development of anime allowed Japan to compete in an animation field where they had, in the era of the Golden Age of American animation, been lagging well behind. By the 1980s, the Japanese animation field was equal to or better than the American industry, making it cost-effective to send American television series episodes to Japan to be animated, then sent back to be finished; such Japanese animated work was not done in the same style as anime, instead being a hybrid style that was not quite full animation but fuller than the limited animation of anime or late-20th century American television animation.

=== Philippines ===
Limited animation made an early history of Philippine animation in the 1970s, established a historical propaganda film Tadhana, directed by Nonoy Marcelo. Unlike any influential animated films in the Philippines, Tadhana's use of animation is crude but unique with distinctive features.

The Philippines has been a popular offshoring destination for Western animation, due to the country's combination of an extensive understanding of Western culture (in part from its lengthy period as an American territory) and low expense.

== Choppy animation ==
Choppy animation is a form of limited animation making extensive use of computer-generated imagery, using a mixed 2D animation where movement appears less smooth and fluid due to fewer in-between frames or deliberate stylistic choices. This includes various styles of stop motion animation, graphic novel and 3DCG anime.

The use of choppy animation in Sony Pictures Animation's 2018 superhero film Spider-Man: Into the Spider-Verse has been cited as a reinvention of animation in the medium. This influenced subsequent films including SPA's other films The Mitchells vs. the Machines (2021), KPop Demon Hunters (2025), and Goat, and DreamWorks Animation's adventure comedies The Bad Guys, Puss in Boots: The Last Wish (both 2022), Dog Man (2025), and Forgotten Island (2026).

== See also ==
- Cutout animation
- Flash animation
- Motion comic
- PowerPoint animation
- Squigglevision
- Stock footage
- UPA (animation studio)
- Adult Swim
