= Syncro-Vox =

Filming technique

Syncro-Vox (sometimes spelled Synchro-Vox) is a filming method that combines static images with moving images, the most common use of which is to superimpose talking lips on a photograph of a celebrity or a cartoon drawing. It is one of the most extreme examples of the cost-cutting strategy of limited animation. The method was developed by cameraman Edwin "Ted" Gillette in the 1950s in order to simulate talking animals in television commercials. Gillette filed the technique on February 4, 1952, and obtained patent #2,739,505 on March 27, 1956.

Because animating a mouth in synchronization with sound was difficult, Syncro-Vox was soon used as a cheap animation technique. The 1959 cartoon Clutch Cargo produced by Cambria Studios was the first to make use of the Syncro-Vox technique. Clutch Cargo, along with fellow Cambria shows Space Angel and Captain Fathom, superimposed actors' lips voicing the scripted dialogue laid over the animated figures.

== Comedic uses ==
The Syncro-Vox technique is considered noticeably cheap and unnerving, so it was short-lived in serious form. The three Cambria Studios cartoons listed above were some of the few examples of the technique being used straight, and the fourth and final Cambria Studios cartoon, The New Three Stooges, did not use it.

Although Syncro-Vox has long since fallen into disuse as a serious animation method (other than when a computerized version was used in the short-lived, and ultimately controversial, Mrs. Munger's Class shorts of the 1990s), it has survived sporadically in comedic form, most notably on Late Night with Conan O'Brien, where a celebrity's face is superimposed with live video of the moving lips of Conan's writer Robert Smigel. This comedy bit was reused on Conan O'Brien's 2010 talk-show Conan and the "In Hot Water" podcast on Compound Media.

A spoof of Cambria Studios' Syncro-Vox cartoons called Mr. Incredible and Pals was also included as a special feature on the 2005 DVD release of The Incredibles.

The technique was used in the Barenaked Ladies music video "Thanks, That Was Fun", which combined clips from previous videos with new mouth movements.

Painty, the talking pirate painting that asks, "Are you ready, kids?" in the introduction to SpongeBob SquarePants cartoons, imitates the Syncro-Vox technique with modern animation technology. It was also featured in standard episodes of the series, including (but not limited to), "Karate Choppers", "Mermaid Man & Barnacle Boy VI: The Motion Picture", "Moving Bubble Bass", and "Knock Knock, Who's There?".

A form of this technique was used in the 1996 BBC Schools series Hallo aus Berlin for the mocapped animated characters Rolli and Rita.

Syncro-Vox was used in the Courage the Cowardly Dog episodes "The Magic Tree of Nowhere" and "The House of Discontent".

It was featured in some That '70s Show episodes imitating Farrah Fawcett, Richard Nixon, and Aerosmith.

Syncro-Vox was used in The Grim Adventures of Billy & Mandy episode "Billy & Mandy Begins".

Syncro-Vox was used in the December 20, 2010 episode of WWE Raw during a promo in which The Miz spoofed Charles Dickens' A Christmas Carol.

In 2011, Syncro-Vox was used in the Family Guy episode "Seahorse Seashell Party".

It was used in the Looney Tunes short "Invasion of the Bunny Snatchers" when a Daffy Duck doppelgänger tells Bugs Bunny he accepted duck season.

Syncro-Vox is used for most of the characters in Annoying Orange and dirtgirlworld (which both shows also sync the actors' eyes), Têtes à claques, and most of the characters in the toy parodies from The Adam and Joe Show, and is common on Songify the News.

A variation of the technique, animated mouths on actual toy action figures, is used on Robot Chicken. In the first Star Wars special of the aforementioned show, the segment Mid-Nite with Zuckuss (a parody of the aforementioned Late Night with Conan O'Brien, whose host voiced the titular character) featured an actual use of the Syncro-Vox technique on an "interview" with Emperor Palpatine as a means to mock the latter; it was also used in the sketch "The Annoying Mjolnir", which spoofs both the aforementioned Annoying Orange and The Avengers.

The Smosh character Charlie the Drunk Guinea Pig is portrayed using the Syncro-Vox technique, superimposing actor Ian Hecox's lips onto live-action footage of the guinea pig; this also applied for archived footage used to portray Charlie as a ghost following the character's in-universe death.

Director Richard Elfman paid tribute to Syncro-Vox in a scene from his 1980 cult film Forbidden Zone, during the scene wherein a character mimes to Machito and Miguelito Valdez' novelty dance song, "Bim Bam Boom"; the usage was necessary because the actor hired to lip sync the song suddenly developed stage fright and froze on-camera.

The Residents' 1995 CD-ROM game, Bad Day on the Midway, uses Syncro-Vox for lip movement. The Residents would also use Syncro-Vox for the music video for "Constantinople", which would be featured on their DVD, Icky Flix.

== See also ==
- Chuckimation, another notoriously low-budget animation shortcut
- Deepfake, a more elaborate adaptation of the same concept
