= Clutch Cargo =

American animated television series

- Title card
- Genre: Action; Adventure
- Created by: Clark Haas
- Voices of: Richard Cotting; Margaret Kerry; Hal Smith
- Theme music composer: Paul Horn
- Country of origin: United States
- Original language: English
- No. of series: 1
- No. of episodes: 52

Production
- Producer: Dick Brown
- Running time: 25 minutes
- Production company: Cambria Productions

Original release
- Network: Broadcast syndication
- Release: March 9, 1959 – 1960

Clutch Cargo is an American animated television series created by cartoonist Clark Haas and produced by Cambria Productions, syndicated beginning on March 9, 1959. The series was notable for its limited animation yet imaginative stories, as well as for being the first widely-known use of Syncro-Vox technology.

== Plot ==
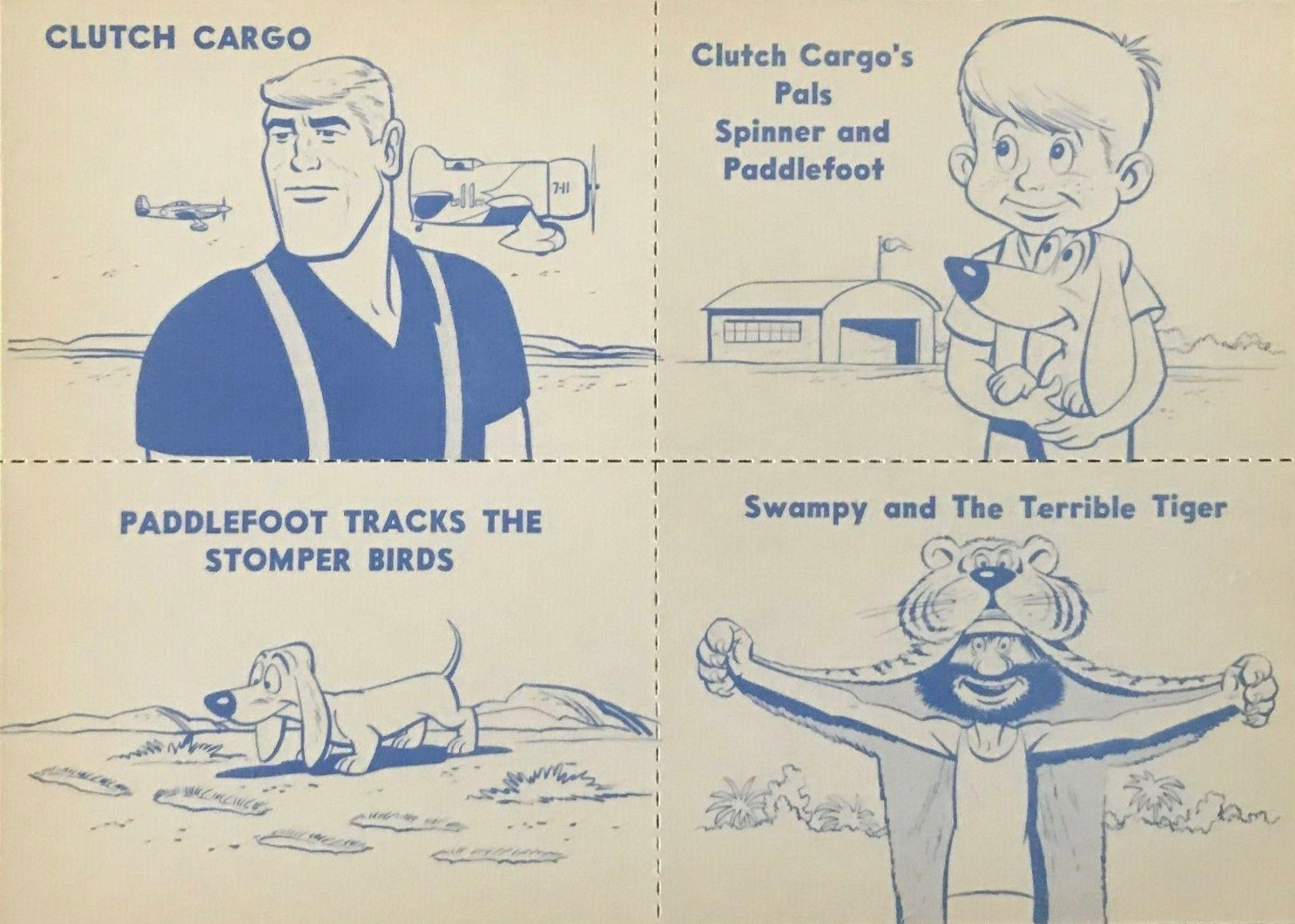
Cartoon cards featuring Clutch Cargo circa 1959

The series' stories centered on the adventurer Clutch Cargo, who was sent around the world on dangerous assignments. Accompanying him on the assignments were his young 9 year old ward Spinner and his pet Dachshund Paddlefoot. Live-action footage of a 1929 Bellanca C-27 Airbus was used; series creator Clark Haas was previously a jet pilot.

The episodes were produced and serialized in five 5-minute chapters each. The first four chapters ended in cliffhangers, with the fifth chapter concluding the adventure. Haas explained that the show was formatted this way so that "the stations can run one a day on weekdays, then recap the whole for a half-hour Saturday show."

== Production technique ==
The show was the first to use the "Syncro-Vox" optical printing system because of budgetary limitations and the pressure to create animation within a tight time frame. Syncro-Vox was invented by Edwin Gillette, television cameraman and partner in Cambria Studios, as a means of superimposing real human mouths on the faces of animals for the popular "talking animal" commercials of the 1950s. Clutch Cargo employed the Syncro-Vox technique by superimposing live-action human lips over limited-motion animation or even motionless animation cels.

To further cut costs, Gillette and special-effects man Scotty Tomany supplemented Syncro-Vox with other tricks to save time and money. Haas explained, "We are not making animated cartoons. We are photographing 'motorized movement' and—the biggest trick of all—combining it with live action...Footage that Disney does for $250,000 we do for $18,000." Gillette and Tomany simulated action in the real-time movement either with the camera or within the cel itself. Other live-action shots were superimposed as a means of adding a certain degree of realism and to keep production costs down; for example, footage of real smoke was used for explosions. Traditional animation was also employed in the series on occasion.

The musical soundtrack to Clutch Cargo was also limited. Jazz musician Paul Horn provided a score using bongos, a vibraphone, and a flute.

== Episodes ==
The series consisted of 52 episodes.

1. The Friendly Head Hunters
2. The Arctic Bird Giant
3. The Desert Queen
4. The Pearl Pirates
5. The Vanishing Gold
6. The Race Car Mystery
7. The Rocket Riot
8. Mystery in the Northwoods
9. Twaddle in Africa
10. The Lost Plateau
11. The Ghost Ship
12. The Rustlers
13. The Missing Train
14. The Devil Bird
15. Pipeline to Danger
16. Mister Abominable
17. Operation Moon Beam
18. Air Race
19. The Haunted Castle
20. The Elephant-Nappers
21. Dragon Fly
22. Sky Circus
23. The Midget Submarine
24. Cliff Dwellers
25. Jungle Train
26. Space Station
27. The Swamp Swindlers
28. The Dinky Incas
29. Kangaroo Express
30. The Shipwreckers
31. The Ivory Counterfeiters
32. Dynamite Fury
33. Alaskan Pilot
34. Swiss Mystery
35. Pirate Isle
36. Crop Dusters
37. The Smog Smuggler
38. Global Test Flight
39. Dead End Gulch
40. The Missing Mermaid
41. Flying Bus
42. Road Race
43. Feather Fuddle
44. Water Wizards
45. The Terrible Tiger
46. The Circus
47. Bush Pilots
48. Cheddar Cheaters
49. The Blunderbird
50. The Case of Ripcord Van Winkle
51. Fortune Cookie Caper
52. Big "X"

== Home video ==
Clutch Cargo home media releases
DVD name	Episodes	Release date	Additional information
Volume 1	26	March 22, 2005	The Story of Clutch Cargo; Clutch Memorabilia; Clutch & Company: Mini-biographies and details of the cast; 1959 Facts and Trivia; Bonus Syncro-Vox Cartoon episode
Volume 2	26	March 22, 2005	The Making of Clutch Cargo; Politically Incorrect; As Seen in Pulp Fiction; 1959 Trailers; Bonus Syncro-Vox Cartoon Episode

In 1996, a live music venue named after the series, Clutch Cargo's, opened in Pontiac, Michigan, but it closed in November 2013 with the site returning to its original use as a church.

== See also ==
- List of animated television series
