= 1896 in animation =

Events in 1896 in animation.

== Events ==
- March 14 – W. Symons received British Patent No. 5,759 for a technique that was used about two years later for the oldest known publication that used a line-sheet to create the illusion of motion in pictures. It is an early use of stereography.
- May – Auguste Berthier published an article about the history of stereoscopic images in French scientific magazine Le Cosmos, which included his method of creating an autostereogram. Alternating strips from the left and right image of a traditional stereoscopic negative had to be recomposed as an interlaced image, preferably during the printing of the image on paper. A glass plate with opaque lines had to be fixed in front of the interlaced print with a few millimeters in between, so the lines on the screen formed a parallax barrier: from the right distance and angle each eye could only see the photographic strips shot from the corresponding angle. The article was illustrated with a diagram of the principle, an image of the two parts of a stereoscopic photograph divided into exaggerated wide bands, and the same strips recomposed as an interlaced image. Berthier's idea was hardly noticed.

== Births ==
=== January ===
- January 15: Marjorie Bennett, Australian actress (voice of Duchess in One Hundred and One Dalmatians), (d. 1982).
- January 24: Yasuji Murata, Japanese animator, master of cutout animation (produced dozens of mostly educational films, featuring characters such as Momotarō and Norakuro), (d. 1966).

=== May ===
- May 3: Dodie Smith, English novelist and playwright, (her children's novel The Hundred and One Dalmatians was adapted into the animated film One Hundred and One Dalmatians), (d. 1990).
- May 18: Hans Fischerkoesen, German commercial animator pioneered the use of three-dimensional elements in animation (Fischerkoesen Studios, Verwitterte Melodie (Weather-Beaten Melody), Der Schneemann (The Snowman), Das dumme Gänslein (The Silly Goose) ), (d. 1973).

=== June ===
- June 21: Bob McCay, American cartoonist, illustrator, comic book colorist and inker, (assistant for his father Winsor McCay, he received sole credit for several of his father's cartoons, including an animated film), (d. 1962).

=== July ===
- July 2: Quirino Cristiani, Italian-born Argentine animation director and cartoonist, created the world's first two animated feature films, and the first animated feature film with sound, pioneer of cutout animation, (El Apóstol, Sin dejar rastros, Firpo-Dempsey, Peludópolis, El mono relojero), (d. 1984).

=== November ===
- November 3: Gustaf Tenggren, Swedish-American illustrator and animator, (Walt Disney Animation Studios), (d. 1970).
- November 16: Jim Jordan, American actor (voice of Orville in The Rescuers), (d. 1988).

== Deaths ==
=== Specific date unknown ===
- Mary Fenton, Anglo-Indian actress, (presented her own magic lantern show before receiving training in singing and acting during the 1870s), dies at age 41–42.
