= Deaths in August 1984 =

The following is a list of notable deaths in August 1984.

Entries for each day are listed alphabetically by surname. A typical entry lists information in the following sequence:

- Name, age, country of citizenship at birth, subsequent country of citizenship (if applicable), reason for notability, cause of death (if known), and reference.

== August 1984 ==
=== 1 ===
- Howard Nostrand, 55, American cartoonist and illustrator, worked on Harvey Comics' horror comics such as Black Cat Mystery, Chamber of Chills, Tomb of Terror and Witches Tales

=== 2 ===
- Quirino Cristiani, 88, Italian-born Argentine animation director and cartoonist, created the world's first two animated feature films, and the first animated feature film with sound, pioneer of cutout animation, (El Apóstol, Sin dejar rastros, Firpo-Dempsey, Peludópolis, El mono relojero)

=== 3 ===
- Ellis Wackett, 83, senior commander in the Royal Australian Air Force

=== 4 ===
- Walter Burke, 75, American character actor, emphysema
- Howard Culver, 66, American actor, meningitis.
- Mary Miles Minter, 82, American actress, one of the leading ladies who established the early Hollywood star system, stroke
- Edmon Ryan, 79, American actor

=== 5 ===
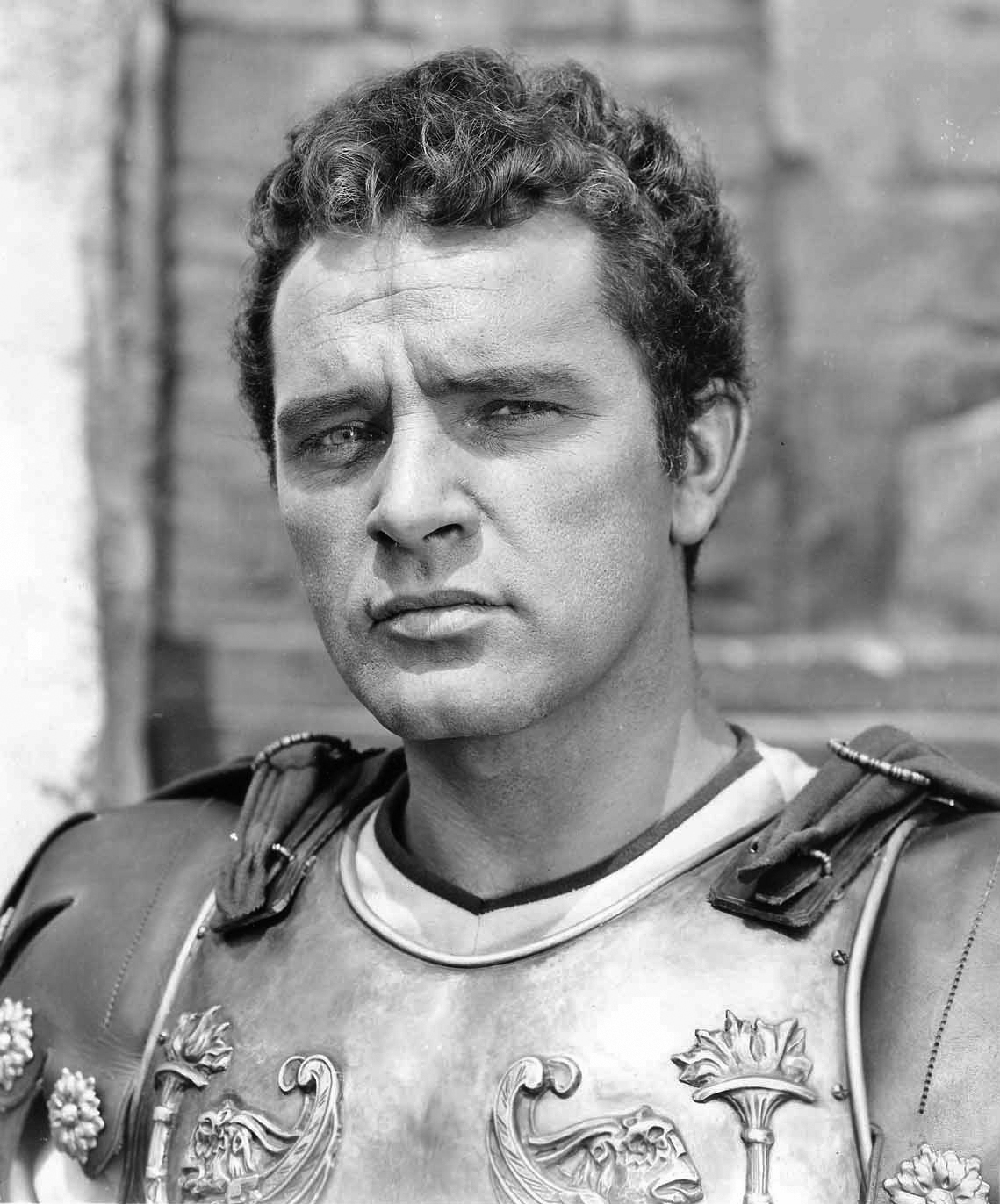
Richard Burton

- Richard Burton, 58, Welsh actor, intracerebral haemorrhage
- Roland Kibbee, 70, American screenwriter and producer

=== 6 ===
- George Abdullah, 64, Aboriginal community leader, heart disease

=== 7 ===
- Esther Phillips, 48, American singer, liver and kidney failure due to long-term drug abuse.

=== 8 ===
- Richard Deacon, 62, American actor, cardiovascular disease
- Denis Johnston, 83, Irish playwright
- Ellen Raskin, 56, American children's writer and illustrator, connective-tissue disease

=== 9 ===
- Christine Hargreaves, 45, English soap opera actress, complications from a brain operation (Note: Most sources incorrectly reported her date of death as 12 August 1984.) Her death was announced to the public three days later, on 12 August 1984.
- Walter Tevis, 56, American novelist and screenwriter, lung cancer

=== 10 ===
- Anatoly Akimov, Soviet football goalkeeper
- Virgil Partch, 67, American illustrator and gag cartoonist, screenwriter for the animated film series Donald Duck, car accident death

=== 11 ===
- David Affleck, 72, Scottish professional footballer
- Hashem Al-e-Agha, 38, Iranian fighter pilot
- Yosef Greenwald, 80, Hungarian rabbi, second Rebbe of the Pupa Hasidic dynasty, stroke
- Alfred A. Knopf Sr., 91, American publisher, eponymous co-founder of the publishing house Alfred A. Knopf, congestive heart failure
- Percy Mayfield, 63, American rhythm and blues singer and songwriter, known for the songs Please Send Me Someone to Love and Hit the Road Jack, heart attack
- Paul Felix Schmidt, 67, Estonian–German chess player

=== 12 ===
- Michel N'Gom, 25, French professional footballer, traffic accident

=== 13 ===
- Clyde Cook, 92, Australian actor and vaudevillian
- Tigran Petrosian, 55, Soviet-Armenian chess grandmaster the ninth World Chess Champion from 1963 to 1969, credited with popularizing chess in Armenia, stomach cancer

=== 14 ===
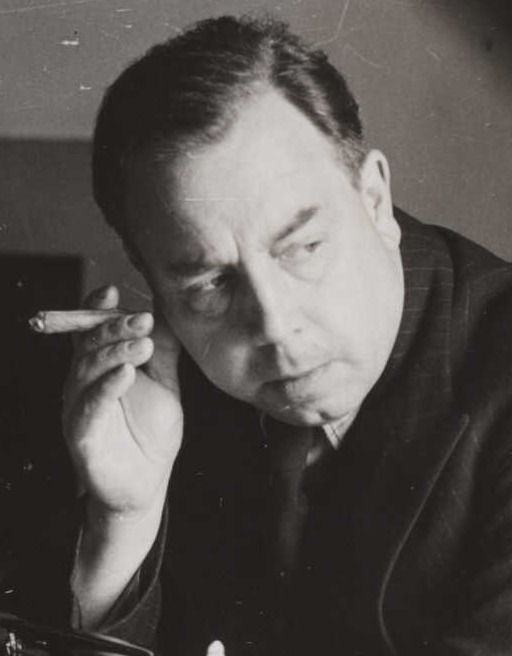
J. B. Priestley

- J. B. Priestley, 89, English novelist, playwright, screenwriter, broadcaster and social commentator, radio propagandist for the BBC during the Battle of Britain, pneumonia

=== 15 ===
- Bobbi Campbell, 32, American public health nurse and early AIDS activist, in 1981 he became the 16th person in San Francisco to be diagnosed with Kaposi's sarcoma, when that was a proxy for an AIDS diagnosis, cryptosporidiosis and cryptococcal meningitis
- Norman Petty, 57, American musician, record producer, publisher, and radio station owner, co-founder of early rock and roll, leukemia

=== 16 ===
- Tommie Aaron, 45, American professional baseball player and coach, leukemia

=== 17 ===
- Bruno Premiani, 77, Italian illustrator and comic book artist, co-creator of the superhero teams Doom Patrol and Teen Titans

=== 18 ===
- İbrahim Kafesoğlu, 70, Turkish historian and academic

=== 19 ===
- Don Newton, 49, American comics artist, best known for his work on The Phantom, Aquaman, Batman, Captain Marvel and the Marvel Family, heart attack while suffering from a debilitating throat disease

=== 20 ===
- Avinash Vyas, 72, Indian composer, lyricist and singer known for his work in Gujarati films

=== 21 ===
- Phil Seuling, 50, American comic book fan convention organizer and comics distributor, organizer of the annual New York Comic Art Convention, developed the concept of the direct market distribution system for getting comics directly into comic book specialty shops, sclerosing cholangitis

=== 22 ===
- Charley Foy, 86, American actor and vaudevillian, sepsis
- Freddie Steele, 71, middleweight boxer and actor, world middleweight boxing champion from 1936 until 1938

=== 23 ===
- Razik Fareed, 90, Sri Lankan landed proprietor, politician and philanthropist

=== 24 ===
- Billy Sands, 73, American character actor, lung cancer

=== 25 ===
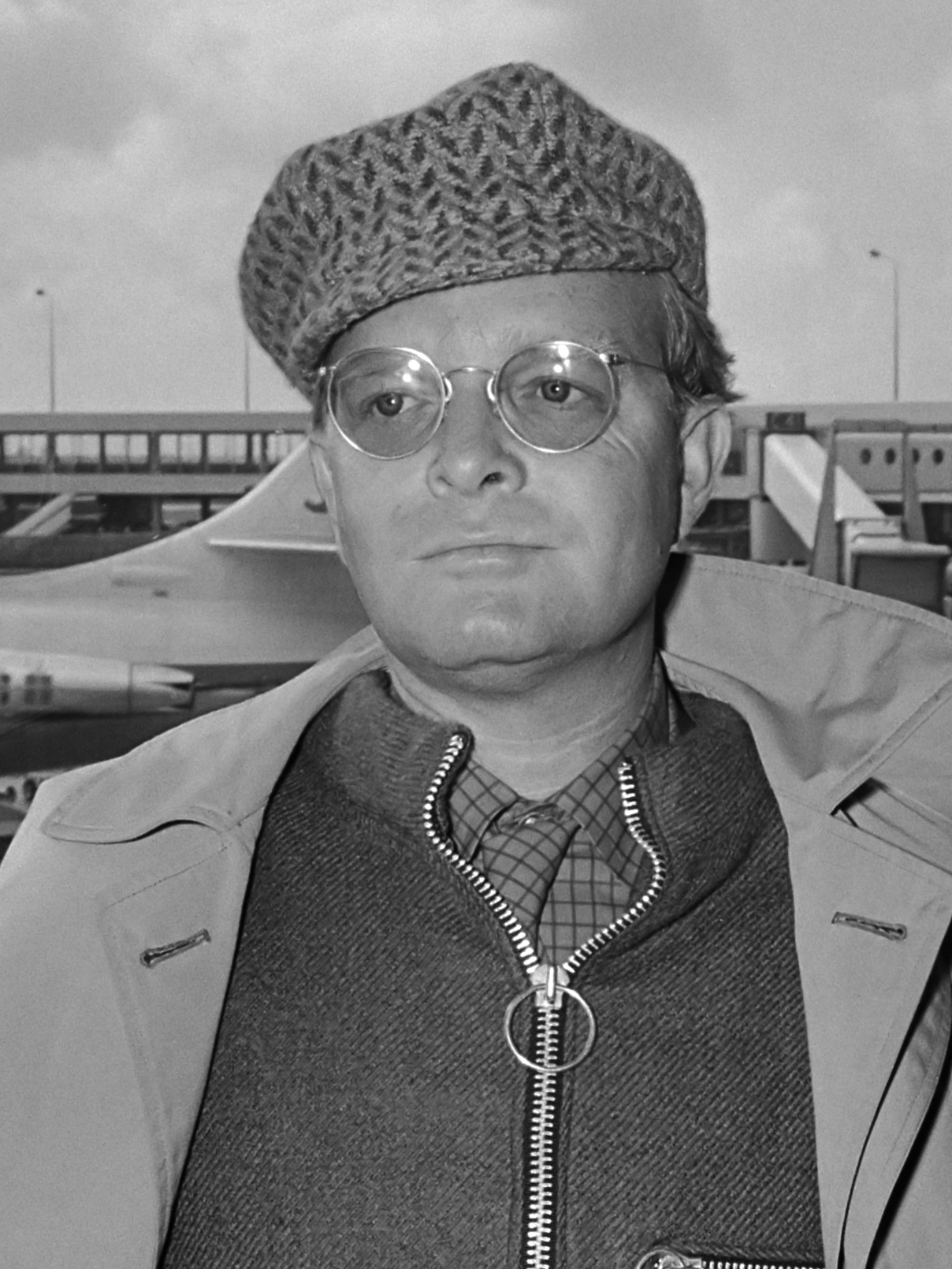
Truman Capote

- Truman Capote, 59, American screenwriter, playwright, novelist, and journalist, co-founder of New Journalism, liver disease complicated by phlebitis and multiple drug intoxication
- Viktor Chukarin, 62, Russian Olympic gymnast
- Henry Lynn, 89, Polish-born American film director, screenwriter, and producer

=== 26 ===
- Ella van Heemstra, 84, Dutch aristocrat

=== 27 ===
- Bernard Youens, 69, English character actor and television announcer

=== 28 ===
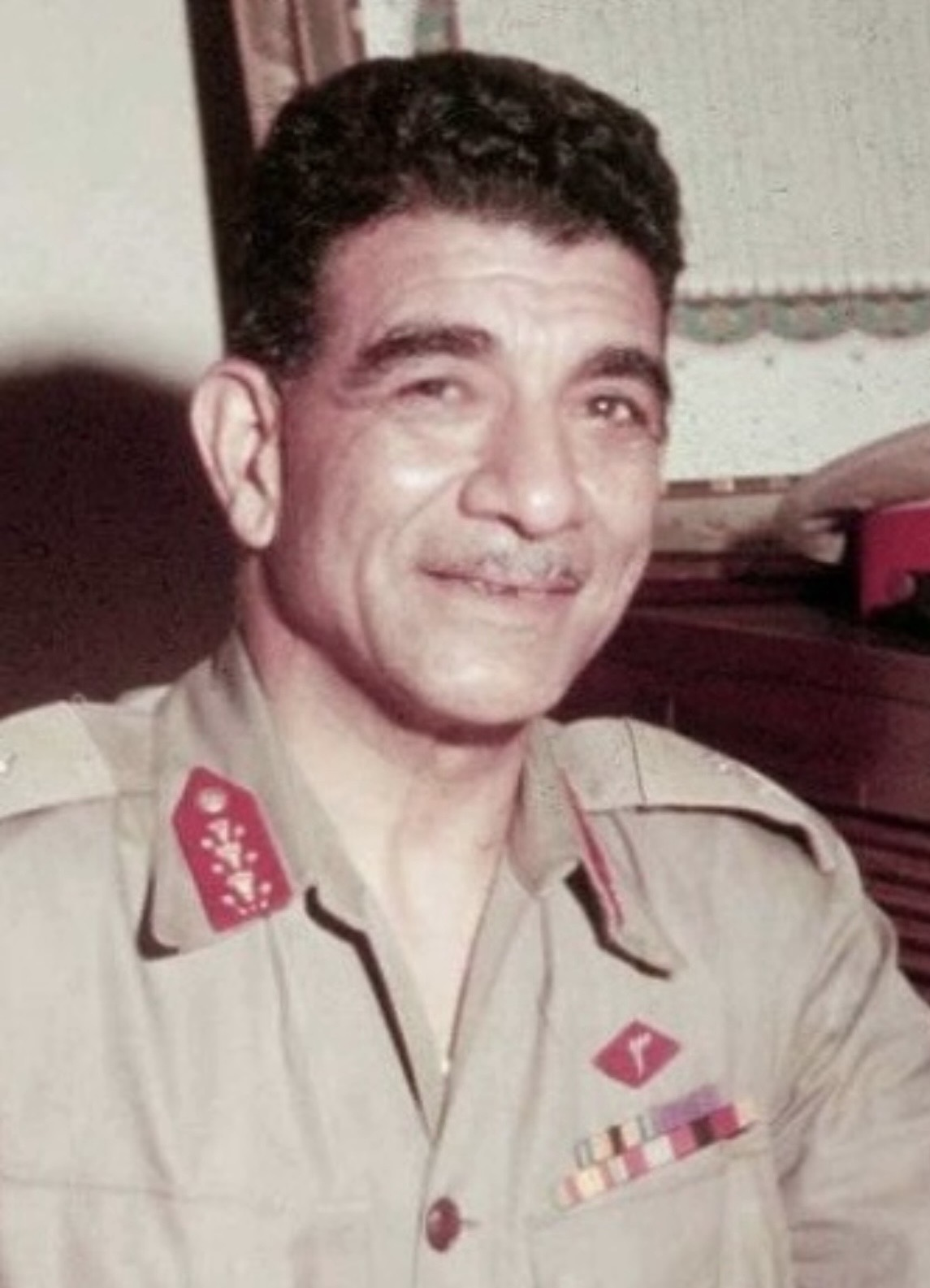
Mohamed Naguib

- Zeyd Ahsen-Böre, 63, Finnish ice hockey player
- Harry Lucey, 70, American comics artist for MLJ Comics and Archie Comics, primary artist on the flagship title Archie from the late 1950s through the mid-1970s, prostate cancer and complications from ALS
- Mohamed Naguib, 83, Egyptian military officer and revolutionary, one of the leaders of the Egyptian revolution of 1952, head of the Egyptian Revolutionary Command Council, Prime Minister of Egypt, and later its first president, cirrhosis

=== 29 ===
- Pierre Gemayel, 78, Lebanese political leader and parliamentary power broker, founder of the right-wing Christian Kataeb Party (Phalangist Party) and former president of the Lebanese Football Association, heart attack
- Pina Menichelli, 94, Italian actress

=== 30 ===
- John O. Aalberg, 87, American sound technician, cancer
- Wesley Lau, 63, American actor and screenwriter, heart failure

=== 31 ===
- Edward J. York, 72, Colonel of the United States Air Force, one of the airmen who took part in the Doolittle Raid (1942) on Tokyo,

== Sources ==
- Kasparov, Garry (2004). My Great Predecessors, Part III. Everyman Chess. ISBN 978-1-85744-371-4.
- Martinelli, Vittorio (2002). Pina Menichelli. Le sfumature del fascino. Rome: Bulzoni.
- O'Dell, Paul (1970). Griffith and the Rise of Hollywood (1970 ed.). New York: A. S. Barnes & Co. p. 163. ISBN 0-498-07718-7.
- Vasiliev, Viktor (1974). Tigran Petrosian: His Life and Games. B. T. Batsford. ISBN 4-87187-813-9.
