= Animation =

Method of creating moving pictures

2D computer animation moving at 10 frames per second (FPS)

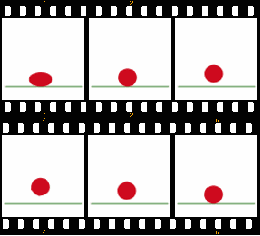
The animation above consists of these six frames repeated indefinitely.

Animation is a filmmaking technique whereby pictures are created or manipulated and then played in sequence to create the illusion of moving images. In traditional animation, images are drawn or painted by hand on transparent celluloid sheets to be photographed and exhibited on film. Animation has been recognised as an artistic medium, specifically within the entertainment industry. Many animations are either traditional animations or computer animations made with computer-generated imagery (CGI). Stop motion animation, in particular claymation, is also prominent alongside these other forms, albeit to a lesser degree.

Animation is contrasted with live action, although the two do not exist in isolation. Many filmmakers have produced films that are a hybrid of the two. As CGI increasingly approximates photographic imagery, filmmakers can relatively easily composite 3D animated visual effects (VFX) into their film, rather than using practical effects.

== General overview ==
Computer animation can be very detailed 3D animation, while 2D computer animation (which may have the look of traditional animation) can be used for stylistic reasons, low bandwidth, or faster real-time renderings. Other common animation methods apply a stop motion technique to two- and three-dimensional objects like paper cutouts, puppets, or clay figures.

An animated cartoon, or simply a cartoon, is an animated film, usually a short film, that features an exaggerated style. This style is often inspired by comic strips, gag cartoons, and other non-animated art forms. Cartoons frequently include anthropomorphic animals, superheroes, or the adventures of human protagonists. The action often revolves around exaggerated physical humor, particularly in predator and prey dynamics (e.g. cats and mice, coyotes and birds), where violent pratfalls such as falls, collisions, and explosions occur, often in ways that would be lethal in the real life.

During the late 1980s, the term "cartoon" was shortened to toon, referring to characters in animated productions, or more specifically, cartoonishly-drawn characters. This term gained popularity first in 1988 with the live-action/animated hybrid film Who Framed Roger Rabbit, which introduced ToonTown, a world inhabited by various animated cartoon characters. In 1990, Tiny Toon Adventures embraced the classic cartoon spirit, introducing a new generation of cartoon characters. Then, in 1993, Animaniacs followed, featuring the three rubber-hose-styled Warner siblings, Yakko, Wakko, and Dot, who are trapped in the 1930s, eventually escaped and found themselves in the Warner Bros. water tower in the 1990s.

The illusion of animation—as in motion pictures in general—has traditionally been attributed to the persistence of vision and later to the phi phenomenon and beta movement, but the exact neurological causes are still uncertain. The illusion of motion caused by a rapid succession of images that minimally differ from each other, with unnoticeable interruptions, is a stroboscopic effect. While animators traditionally used to draw each part of the movements and changes of figures on transparent cels that could be moved over a separate background, computer animation is usually based on programming paths between key frames to maneuver digitally created figures throughout a digitally created environment.

Analog mechanical animation media that rely on the rapid display of sequential images include the phenakistiscope, zoetrope, flip book, praxinoscope, and film. Television and video are popular electronic animation media that originally were analog and now operate digitally. For display on computers, technology such as the animated GIF and Flash animation were developed.

In addition to short films, feature films, television series, animated GIFs, and other media dedicated to the display of moving images, animation is also prevalent in video games, motion graphics, user interfaces, and visual effects.

The physical movement of image parts through simple mechanics—for instance, moving images in magic lantern shows—can also be considered animation. The mechanical manipulation of three-dimensional puppets and objects to emulate living beings has a very long history in automata. Electronic automata were popularised by Disney as animatronics.

== Etymology ==
The word animation comes from the Latin word animātiō, meaning 'bestowing of life'. The earlier meaning of the English word is 'liveliness' and has been in use much longer than the meaning of 'moving image medium'.

== History ==
Prof. Stampfers Stroboscopische Scheibe No. X (1833)

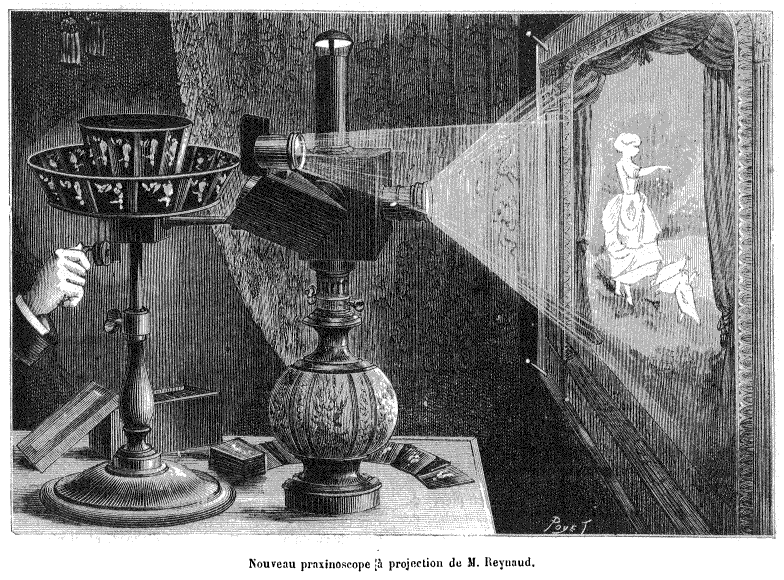
A projecting praxinoscope, from 1882, here shown superimposing an animated figure on a separately projected background scene

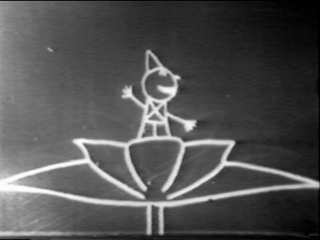
Fantasmagorie (1908) by Émile Cohl

=== Before cinematography ===
Long before modern animation began, audiences around the world were captivated by the magic of moving characters. For centuries, master artists and craftsmen have brought puppets, automatons, shadow puppets, and magic lantern projections to life, inspiring the imagination through physically manipulated wonders.

In 1833, Joseph Plateau's phenakistiscope introduced the principle of stroboscopic animation, which would later be applied in the zoetrope (introduced in 1866), the flip book (1868), the praxinoscope (1877) and film. The device features sequential pictures arranged in sectors on a cardboard disc between regularly spaced apertures in its circumference. When the reflection of the spinning disc is viewed in a mirror through the apertures, the interruptions (by the spaces between apertures) obscure the passing of the pictures, which limits motion blur and leave short exposures of successive images at the same spots, so fast that the human visual system can only interpret them as a single image of moving or changing figures.

Émile Reynaud screened hand-painted animations with his Théâtre Optique at the Musée Grévin in Paris between 1892 and 1900, probably inspiring some of the pioneers of cinematographic technologies.

=== Silent era ===
When cinematography eventually broke through in the 1890s, the wonder of the realistic details in the new medium was seen as its biggest accomplishment. It took years before animation found its way to the cinemas. The successful short The Haunted Hotel (1907) by J. Stuart Blackton popularised stop motion and reportedly inspired Émile Cohl to create Fantasmagorie (1908), regarded as the oldest known example of a complete traditional (hand-drawn) animation on standard cinematographic film. Other great artistic and very influential short films were created by Ladislas Starevich with his puppet animations since 1910 and by Winsor McCay with detailed hand-drawn animation in films such as Little Nemo (1911) and Gertie the Dinosaur (1914).

=== Animation production across the Globe ===
Feline Follies with Felix the Cat, silent, 1919

==== American golden age ====
During the 1910s, the production of animated "cartoons" became an industry in the US. Successful producer John Randolph Bray and animator Earl Hurd patented the cel animation process that dominated the animation industry for the rest of the century. Felix the Cat, who debuted in 1919, became the first fully realised anthropomorphic animal character in the history of American animation. The characteristics of Felix the cat's physical appearance would come to be the standard model for cartoon character in the following years.

In 1928, Steamboat Willie, featuring Mickey Mouse and Minnie Mouse, popularised film-with-synchronised-sound and put Walt Disney's studio at the forefront of the animation industry. Although Disney Animation's actual output relative to total global animation output has always been very small, the studio has overwhelmingly dominated the "aesthetic norms" of animation ever since.

The enormous success of Mickey Mouse is seen as the start of the golden age of American animation that would last until the 1960s. The United States dominated the world market of animation with a plethora of cel-animated theatrical shorts. Several studios would introduce characters that would become very popular and would have long-lasting careers, including Walt Disney Productions' Goofy (1932) and Donald Duck (1934), Fleischer Studios/Paramount Cartoon Studios' Out of the Inkwell' Koko the Clown (1918), Bimbo and Betty Boop (1930), Popeye (1933) and Casper the Friendly Ghost (1945), Warner Bros. Cartoon Studios' Looney Tunes' Porky Pig (1935), Daffy Duck (1937), Elmer Fudd (1937–1940), Bugs Bunny (1938–1940), Tweety (1942), Sylvester the Cat (1945), Wile E. Coyote and the Road Runner (1949), MGM cartoon studio's Tom and Jerry (1940) and Droopy, Universal Cartoon Studios' Woody Woodpecker (1940), Terrytoons/20th Century Studios's Mighty Mouse (1942), and United Artists' Pink Panther (1963).

==== European History of Animation Production ====
The Adventures of Prince Achmed (1926) by Lotte Reiniger

Polish art student Ladislas Starevitch would employ stop-motion animation creating films such as The Cameraman's Revenge (1912) and The Tale of the Fox (1930).

Pinscreen animation would be developed by Alexandre Alexeïeff in France being used to create films such as A Night on Bald Mountain (1933).

After working on it for three years, Lotte Reiniger released the German feature-length silhouette animation Die Abenteuer des Prinzen Achmed in 1926, the oldest extant animated feature.

==== Animation Production in China ====
In 1941, Tieshan gonzhu (Princess Iron Fan) would become the first animated feature film in Asia, given the title of "the Chinese version of Disney's Snow White and the Seven Dwarfs". Following in 1944, the animated film Fengzheng (The Kite) would be published combining animation characteristics of Disney shorts of that era called "plasmaticness" and local Chinese folklore.

This era of East Asian animation would last until the mid 1940's, however a plethora of notable animation films would be produced such as Chutian de Beijing (Peking in Spring), Dongya de liming (The dawn in East Asia), Kepa de Huliela (The terrible cholera), Emo de Siyu (The demons' whispers), Tenkū ryokō (1936), Kotori to usage (Birds and Rabbits), Tsuki no Miya no ōjo-sama (Princess of the moon palace, 1934), Mābō no Tōkyō orinpikku taikai (Ma-bo's Tokyo Olympic Games, 1936), Sora no Momtarō (Momotarō's sky adventure, 1931), Saru kani gassen (Monkey and the crabs, 1927), Da duhui (The metropolis, 1941), and Kuala de pengyou(Happy friends, 1942).

=== Features before CGI ===
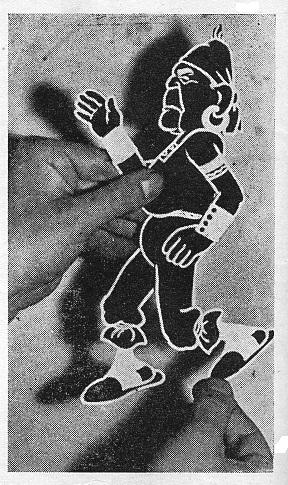
Italian-Argentine cartoonist Quirino Cristiani showing the cut and articulated figure of his satirical character El Peludo (based on President Yrigoyen) patented in 1916 for the realisation of his films, including the world's first animated feature film El Apóstol

In 1917, Italian-Argentine director Quirino Cristiani made the first feature-length film El Apóstol (now lost), which became a critical and commercial success. It was followed by Cristiani's Sin dejar rastros in 1918, but one day after its premiere, the film was confiscated by the government.

In 1937, Walt Disney Studios premiered their first animated feature Snow White and the Seven Dwarfs, still one of the highest-grossing traditional animation features as of May 2020. The Fleischer studios followed this example in 1939 with Gulliver's Travels with some success. Partly due to foreign markets being cut off by the Second World War, Disney's next features Pinocchio, Fantasia (both 1940), Fleischer Studios' second animated feature Mr. Bug Goes to Town (1941–1942) failed at the box office. For several decades, Disney was the only American studio to regularly produce animated features, until Ralph Bakshi became the first to release more than a handful of features. Sullivan-Bluth Studios began to regularly produce animated features starting with An American Tail in 1986.

Although relatively few titles became as successful as Disney's features, other countries developed their own animation industries that produced both short and feature theatrical animations in a wide variety of styles, relatively often including stop motion and cutout animation techniques. Soviet Soyuzmultfilm animation studio, founded in 1936, produced 20 films (including shorts) per year on average and reached 1,582 titles in 2018. China, Czechoslovakia / Czech Republic, Italy, France, and Belgium were other countries that more than occasionally released feature films.

=== Television ===
Animation became very popular on television since the 1950s, when television sets started to become common in most developed countries. Cartoons were mainly programmed for children, on convenient time slots, and especially US youth spent many hours watching Saturday-morning cartoons. Many classic cartoons found a new life on the small screen and by the end of the 1950s, the production of new animated cartoons started to shift from theatrical releases to TV series. Hanna-Barbera Productions was especially prolific and had huge hit series, such as The Flintstones (1960–1966) (the first prime time animated series), Scooby-Doo (since 1969) and Belgian co-production The Smurfs (1981–1989). The constraints of American television programming and the demand for an enormous quantity resulted in cheaper and quicker limited animation methods and much more formulaic scripts. Quality dwindled until more daring animation surfaced in the late 1980s and in the early 1990s with hit series, the first cartoon of The Simpsons (1987), which later developed into its own show (in 1989) and SpongeBob SquarePants (since 1999) as part of a "renaissance" of American animation. American television animation experienced another renaissance in the 2010s, where series such as Adventure Time, Steven Universe, and She-Ra and the Princessess of Power expanded animation's possibilities for experimentation, narrative depth, and queer representation.

While US animated series also spawned successes internationally, many other countries produced their own child-oriented programming, relatively often preferring stop motion and puppetry over cel animation. Japanese anime TV series became very successful internationally since the 1960s, and European producers looking for affordable cel animators relatively often started co-productions with Japanese studios, resulting in hit series such as Barbapapa (The Netherlands/Japan/France 1973–1977), Wickie und die starken Männer/小さなバイキング ビッケ (Vicky the Viking) (Austria/Germany/Japan 1974), Maya the Honey Bee (Japan/Germany 1975) and The Jungle Book (Italy/Japan 1989).

=== Switch from cels to computers ===
Computer animation was gradually developed since the 1940s. 3D wireframe animation started popping up in the mainstream in the 1970s, with an early (short) appearance in the sci-fi thriller Futureworld (1976).

The Rescuers Down Under was the first feature film to be completely created digitally without a camera. It was produced using the Computer Animation Production System (CAPS), developed by Pixar in collaboration with The Walt Disney Company in the late 1980s, in a style similar to traditional cel animation.

The so-called 3D style, more often associated with computer animation, became the dominant technique following the success of Pixar's Toy Story (1995), the first computer-animated feature in this style.

Most of the cel animation studios switched to producing mostly computer-animated films around the 1990s, as it proved cheaper and more profitable. Not only the very popular 3D animation style was generated with computers, but also most of the films and series with a more traditional hand-crafted appearance, in which the charming characteristics of cel animation could be emulated with software, while new digital tools helped developing new styles and effects.

== Economic status ==
In 2010, the animation market was estimated to be worth circa US$80 billion. By 2021, the value had increased to an estimated US$370 billion. Animated feature-length films returned the highest gross margins (around 52%) of all film genres between 2004 and 2013. Animation as an art and industry continues to thrive as of the early 2020s.

== Education, propaganda and commercials ==
The clarity of animation makes it a powerful tool for instruction, while its total malleability also allows exaggeration that can be employed to convey strong emotions and to thwart reality. It has therefore been widely used for other purposes than mere entertainment.

During World War II, animation was widely exploited for propaganda. Many American studios, including Warner Bros. and Disney, lent their talents and their cartoon characters to convey to the public certain war values. These efforts extended to other countries well into the Cold War era, particularly as it pertained to "combatting" communism. For example, the English 1954 adaptation of George Orwell's Animal Farm (the nation's first feature-length animated film) is speculated to have had its production funded by the CIA.

Animation has been very popular in television commercials, both due to its graphic appeal, and the humour it can provide. Some animated characters in commercials have survived for decades, such as Snap, Crackle and Pop in advertisements for Kellogg's cereals. Tex Avery was the producer of the first Raid "Kills Bugs Dead" commercials in 1966, which were very successful for the company.

== Other media, merchandise and theme parks ==
Apart from their success in movie theatres and television series, many cartoon characters would also prove lucrative when licensed for all kinds of merchandise and for other media.

Animation has traditionally been very closely related to comic books. While many comic book characters found their way to the screen (which is often the case in Japan, where many manga are adapted into anime), original animated characters also commonly appear in comic books and magazines. Somewhat similarly, characters and plots for video games (an interactive form of animation that became its own medium) have been derived from films and vice versa.

While many animation companies commercially exploit their creations outside moving image media, The Walt Disney Company is a well known example. Since first being licensed for a children's writing tablet in 1929, their Mickey Mouse mascot has been depicted on many products, as have many other Disney characters. This influenced some pejorative use of Mickey's name, but licensed Disney products sell well, and the so-called Disneyana has avid collectors, and even a dedicated Disneyana Fan Club (since 1984).

Disneyland opened in 1955 and features many attractions that were based on Disney's cartoon characters. Its enormous success spawned several other Disney theme parks and resorts. Disney's earnings from the theme parks have relatively often been higher than those from their movies.

== Awards ==
As with any other form of media, animation has instituted awards for excellence in the field. Many are part of general or regional film award programmes, like the China's Golden Rooster Award for Best Animation (since 1981). Awards programmes dedicated to animation, with many categories, include ASIFA-Hollywood's Annie Awards, the Emile Awards in Europe and the Anima Mundi awards in Brazil.

=== Academy Awards ===
Apart from Academy Awards for Best Animated Short Film (since 1932) and Best Animated Feature (since 2002), animated movies have been nominated and rewarded in other categories, relatively often for Best Original Song and Best Original Score.

Beauty and the Beast was the first animated film nominated for Best Picture, in 1991. Up (2009) and Toy Story 3 (2010) also received Best Picture nominations, after the academy expanded the number of nominees from five to ten.

== Production ==
Joy & Heron

The creation of non-trivial animation works (i.e., longer than a few seconds) has developed as a form of filmmaking, with certain unique aspects. Traits common to both live-action and animated feature films are labour intensity and high production costs.

The most important difference is that once a film is in the production phase, the marginal cost of one more shot is higher for animated films than live-action films. It is relatively easy for a director to ask for one more take during principal photography of a live-action film, but every take on an animated film must be manually rendered by animators (although the task of rendering slightly different takes has been made less tedious by modern computer animation). It is pointless for a studio to pay the salaries of dozens of animators to spend weeks creating a visually dazzling five-minute scene if that scene fails to effectively advance the plot of the film. Thus, animation studios starting with Disney began the practice in the 1930s of maintaining story departments where storyboard artists develop every single scene through storyboards, then handing the film over to the animators only after the production team is satisfied that all the scenes make sense as a whole. While live-action films are now also storyboarded, they enjoy more latitude to depart from storyboards (i.e., real-time improvisation).

Another problem unique to animation is the requirement to maintain a film's consistency from start to finish, even as films have grown longer and teams have grown larger. Animators, like all artists, necessarily have individual styles, but must subordinate their individuality in a consistent way to whatever style is employed on a particular film. Since the early 1980s, teams of about 500 to 600 people, of whom 50 to 70 are animators, typically have created feature-length animated films. It is relatively easy for two or three artists to match their styles; synchronising those of dozens of artists is more difficult.

This problem is usually solved by having a separate group of visual development artists develop an overall look and palette for each film before the animation begins. While animators must "sacrifice their personal drawing styles so that the work of many hands appears to be that of one", visual development artists are allowed to "create new worlds, new characters, and new entertainment possibilities in their own individualistic graphic styles". Character designers on the visual development team draw model sheets to show how each character should look with different facial expressions, posed in different positions, and viewed from different angles. On traditionally animated projects, maquettes were often sculpted to further help the animators see how characters would look from different angles.

Unlike live-action films, animated films were traditionally developed beyond the synopsis stage through the storyboard format; the storyboard artists would then receive credit for writing the film. The traditional approach worked for several decades because prior to the 1960s, no one except Disney was attempting to regularly produce feature-length animated films. All other animation studios, with occasional exceptions, were producing short films only a few minutes in length. For short films, it was enough for the storyboard artists to work up a few visual gags and then string them together to form a crude plot.

In 1960, Hanna-Barbera pioneered the longer animated sitcom format for television with The Flintstones. Hanna-Barbera and the other early television animation studios soon discovered that storyboarding was far too inefficient to fill up a half-hour episode on the extremely tight budgets typical of television. During the 1960s, these studios experimented with a more efficient method for developing story material: a screenwriter is hired to draft a written screenplay which is approved and handed over to the storyboard artists for storyboarding. This method creates significant tension between screenwriters and storyboard artists, in that some artists feel that people who cannot draw should not be writing for animation, while some writers feel that artists do not understand how to write. Despite that tension, it has become and remains the dominant method by which animation studios develop both feature-length films and television shows.

Ironically, the Disney studio was relatively slow to adopt this method. The first Disney feature animated film to have a complete screenplay written and approved before storyboarding was One Hundred and One Dalmatians (1961). However, 101 Dalmatians was "a short-lived experiment"; the next Disney film to follow this method was The Great Mouse Detective (1986).

Finally, another key difference is that actors traditionally record vocal tracks for animated films in separate individual sessions; they often meet one another for the first time only at the film's premiere. Actors usually schedule sessions in the recording studio around their live-action work. In live-action filmmaking, it is very common for actors to drop out of projects due to scheduling conflicts, while in animation, recording actors separately makes it possible to "get a lot more stars into one movie" than would be possible if those actors needed to be physically present on the same set at the same time.

== Techniques ==
=== Traditional ===
An example of traditional animation, a horse animated by rotoscoping from Eadweard Muybridge's 19th-century photos

Traditional animation (also called cel animation or hand-drawn animation) is the process that was used for most animated films of the 20th century. The individual frames of a traditionally animated film are photographs of drawings, first drawn on paper. To create the illusion of movement, each drawing differs slightly from the one before it. The animators' drawings are traced or photocopied onto transparent acetate sheets called cels, which are filled in with paints in assigned colours or tones on the side opposite the line drawings. The completed character cels are photographed one-by-one against a painted background by a rostrum camera onto motion picture film.

The traditional cel animation process became obsolete by the beginning of the 21st century. In modern traditionally animated films, animators' drawings and the backgrounds are either scanned into or drawn directly into a computer system. Various software programmes are used to colour the drawings and simulate camera movement and effects. The final animated piece is output to one of several delivery media, including traditional 35 mm film and newer media with digital video. The "look" of traditional cel animation is still preserved, and the character animators' work has remained essentially the same over the past 90 years. Some animation producers have used the term "tradigital" (a play on the words "traditional" and "digital") to describe cel animation that uses significant computer technology.

Examples of traditionally animated feature films include Pinocchio (United States, 1940), Animal Farm (United Kingdom, 1954), Lucky and Zorba (Italy, 1998), and The Illusionist (British-French, 2010). Traditionally animated films produced with the aid of computer technology include The Lion King (US, 1994), Anastasia (US, 1997), The Prince of Egypt (US, 1998), Akira (Japan, 1988), Spirited Away (Japan, 2001), The Triplets of Belleville (France, 2003), and The Secret of Kells (Irish-French-Belgian, 2009).

==== Full ====
Full animation is the process of producing high-quality traditionally animated films that regularly use detailed drawings and plausible movement, having a smooth animation. Fully animated films can be made in a variety of styles, from more realistically animated works like those produced by the Walt Disney studio (The Little Mermaid, Beauty and the Beast, Aladdin, The Lion King) to the more 'cartoon' styles of the Warner Bros. animation studio. Many of the Disney animated features are examples of full animation, as are non-Disney works, The Secret of NIMH (US, 1982), The Iron Giant (US, 1999), and Nocturna (Spain, 2007). Fully animated films are often animated on "twos", sometimes on "ones", which means that 12 to 24 drawings are required for a single second of film.

==== Limited ====
Limited animation involves the use of less detailed or more stylised drawings and methods of choppy or "skippy" movement animation. Limited animation uses fewer drawings per second, thereby limiting the fluidity of the animation. This is a more economic technique. Pioneered by the artists at the American studio United Productions of America, limited animation can be used as a method of stylised artistic expression, as in Gerald McBoing-Boing (US, 1951), Yellow Submarine (UK, 1968), and certain anime produced in Japan. Its primary use, however, has been in producing cost-effective animated content for media for television (the work of Hanna-Barbera, Filmation, and other TV animation studios) and later the Internet (web cartoons).

==== Rotoscoping ====
Rotoscoping is a technique patented by Max Fleischer in 1917 where animators trace live-action movement, frame by frame. The source film can be directly copied from actors' outlines into animated drawings, as in The Lord of the Rings (US, 1978), or used in a stylised and expressive manner, as in Waking Life (US, 2001) and A Scanner Darkly (US, 2006). Some other examples are Fire and Ice (US, 1983), Heavy Metal (1981), and Aku no Hana (Japan, 2013).

==== Live-action blending ====
Live-action/animation is a technique combining hand-drawn characters into live action shots or live-action actors into animated shots. One of the earlier uses was in Koko the Clown when Koko was drawn over live-action footage. Walt Disney and Ub Iwerks created a series of Alice Comedies (1923–1927), in which a live-action girl enters an animated world. Other examples include Allegro Non Troppo (Italy, 1976), Who Framed Roger Rabbit (US, 1988), Volere volare (Italy 1991), Cool World (US, 1992), The Pagemaster (US, 1994) Space Jam (US, 1996) and Osmosis Jones (US, 2001).

=== Stop motion ===
Stop motion is used to describe animation created by physically manipulating real-world objects and photographing them one frame of film at a time to create the illusion of movement. There are many different types of stop-motion animation, usually named after the materials used to create the animation. Computer software is widely available to create this type of animation; traditional stop-motion animation is usually less expensive but more time-consuming to produce than current computer animation.

Stop motion
Typically involves stop-motion puppet figures interacting in a constructed environment, in contrast to real-world interaction in model animation. The puppets generally have an armature inside of them to keep them still and steady to constrain their motion to particular joints. Examples include The Tale of the Fox (France, 1937), The Nightmare Before Christmas (US, 1993), Corpse Bride (US, 2005), Coraline (US, 2009), the films of Jiří Trnka and the adult animated sketch-comedy television series Robot Chicken (US, 2005–present).

Puppetoons
Created using techniques developed by George Pal, are puppet-animated films that typically use a different version of a puppet for different frames, rather than manipulating one existing puppet.

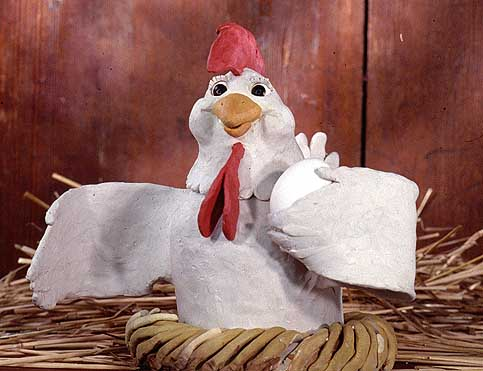
A clay animation scene from a Finnish television commercial

Clay animation or Plasticine animation
(Often called claymation, which, however, is a trademarked name). It uses figures made of clay or a similar malleable material to create stop-motion animation. The figures may have an armature or wire frame inside, similar to the related puppet animation (below), that can be manipulated to pose the figures. Alternatively, the figures may be made entirely of clay, in the films of Bruce Bickford, where clay creatures morph into a variety of different shapes. Examples of clay-animated works include The Gumby Show (US, 1957–1967), Mio Mao (Italy, 1974–2005), Morph shorts (UK, 1977–2000), Wallace & Gromit shorts (UK, as of 1989), Jan Švankmajer's Dimensions of Dialogue (Czechoslovakia, 1982), The Trap Door (UK, 1984). Films include Wallace & Gromit: The Curse of the Were-Rabbit, Chicken Run and The Adventures of Mark Twain.

Strata-cut animation
Most commonly a form of clay animation in which a long bread-like "loaf" of clay, internally packed tight and loaded with varying imagery, is sliced into thin sheets, with the animation camera taking a frame of the end of the loaf for each cut, eventually revealing the movement of the internal images within.

Cutout animation
(Sometimes called paper animation) A type of stop-motion animation produced by moving two-dimensional pieces of material paper or cloth. Examples include Terry Gilliam's animated sequences from Monty Python's Flying Circus (UK, 1969–1974); Fantastic Planet (France/Czechoslovakia, 1973); Tale of Tales (Russia, 1979), Matt Stone and Trey Parker the first cutout animation South Park (1992), the pilot episode of the adult television sitcom series (and sometimes in episodes) of South Park (US, 1997) and the music video Live for the moment, from Verona Riots band (produced by Alberto Serrano and Nívola Uyá, Spain 2014).

Silhouette animation
A variant of cutout animation in which the characters are backlit and only visible as silhouettes. Examples include The Adventures of Prince Achmed (Weimar Republic, 1926) and Princes et Princesses (France, 2000).
Paper craft animation
a stop motion animation using Construction paper or Card stock by doing cutting, folding, gluing and assembling.

Model animation
Stop-motion animation created to interact with and exist as a part of a live-action world. Intercutting, matte effects and split screens are often employed to blend stop-motion characters or objects with live actors and settings. Examples include the work of Ray Harryhausen, as seen in films, Jason and the Argonauts (1963), and the work of Willis H. O'Brien on films, King Kong (1933).

Go motion
A variant of model animation that uses various techniques to create motion blur between frames of film, which is not present in traditional stop motion. The technique was invented by Industrial Light & Magic and Phil Tippett to create special effect scenes for the film Star Wars: Episode V – The Empire Strikes Back (1980). Another example is the dragon named "Vermithrax" from the 1981 film Dragonslayer.

Object animation
The use of regular inanimate objects in stop-motion animation, as opposed to specially created items.

Graphic animation
Uses non-drawn flat visual graphic material (photographs, newspaper clippings, magazines, etc.), which are sometimes manipulated frame by frame to create movement. At other times, the graphics remain stationary, while the stop-motion camera is moved to create on-screen action.
Brickfilm
A subgenre of object animation involving using Lego or other similar brick toys to make an animation. These have had a recent boost in popularity with the advent of video sharing sites, YouTube and the availability of cheap cameras and animation software.

Pixilation
Involves the use of live humans as stop-motion characters. This allows for a number of surreal effects, including disappearances and reappearances, allowing people to appear to slide across the ground, and other effects. Examples of pixilation include The Secret Adventures of Tom Thumb and Angry Kid shorts, and the Academy Award-winning Neighbours by Norman McLaren.

=== Computer ===
Computer animation encompasses a variety of techniques, the unifying factor being that the animation is created digitally on a computer. 2D animation techniques tend to focus on image manipulation while 3D techniques usually build virtual worlds in which characters and objects move and interact. 3D animation can create images that seem real to the viewer.

==== 2D ====
A 2D animation of two circles joined by a chain

2D animation figures are created or edited on the computer using 2D bitmap graphics and 2D vector graphics. This includes automated computerised versions of traditional animation techniques, interpolated morphing, onion skinning and interpolated rotoscoping. 2D animation has many applications, including After Effects Animation, analog computer animation, Flash animation, and PowerPoint animation. Cinemagraphs are still photographs in the form of an animated GIF file of which part is animated.

Final line advection animation is a technique used in 2D animation, to give artists and animators more influence and control over the final product as everything is done within the same department. Speaking about using this approach in Paperman, John Kahrs said that "Our animators can change things, actually erase away the CG underlayer if they want, and change the profile of the arm."

When working with game animations, skeletal 2D animations are commonly created using tools like Spine, DragonBones, Blender COA Tools, Rive, and the built-in Unity editor. The primary benefit of this approach is the ability to reuse images, which reduces the amount of graphics stored in RAM. This principle of maximising resource efficiency means that by reusing existing elements, you can enhance the visual appeal of animations without needing to create additional graphics.

==== 3D ====
Caminandes | Llama Drama

3D animation is digitally modelled and manipulated by an animator. The 3D model maker usually starts by creating a 3D polygon mesh for the animator to manipulate. A mesh typically includes many vertices that are connected by edges and faces, which give the visual appearance of form to a 3D object or 3D environment. Sometimes, the mesh is given an internal digital skeletal structure called an armature that can be used to control the mesh by weighting the vertices. This process is called rigging and can be used in conjunction with key frames to create movement.

Other techniques can be applied, mathematical functions (e.g., gravity, particle simulations), simulated fur or hair, and effects, fire and water simulations. These techniques fall under the category of 3D dynamics.

===== Terms =====
- Cel shading is used to mimic traditional animation using computer software. The shading looks stark, with less blending of colours. Examples include Skyland (2007, France), The Iron Giant (1999, U.S.), Futurama (1999, U.S.) Appleseed Ex Machina (2007, Japan), The Legend of Zelda: The Wind Waker (2002, Japan), The Legend of Zelda: Breath of the Wild (2017, Japan)
- Machinima – Films created by screen capturing in video games and virtual worlds. The term originated from the software introduction in the 1980s demoscene, as well as the 1990s recordings of the first-person shooter video game Quake.
- Motion capture is used when live-action actors wear special suits that allow computers to copy their movements into CG characters. Examples include Polar Express (2004, US), Beowulf (2007, US), A Christmas Carol (2009, US), The Adventures of Tintin (2011, US) kochadiiyan (2014, India)
- Computer animation is used primarily for animation that attempts to resemble real life while having a stylised cartoonish appearance, using advanced rendering that mimics in detail skin, plants, water, fire, clouds, etc. Examples include Up (2009, US), How to Train Your Dragon (2010, US)
- Physically based animation is animation using computer simulations.

=== Mechanical ===
- Animatronics is the use of mechatronics to create machines that seem animate rather than robotic.
  - Audio-Animatronics is a form of robotics animation, combined with 3D animation, created by Walt Disney Imagineering for shows and attractions at Disney theme parks move and make noise (generally a recorded speech or song). They are fixed to whatever supports them. They can sit and stand, and they cannot walk. An Audio-Animatron is different from an android-type robot in that it uses prerecorded movements and sounds, rather than responding to external stimuli. In 2009, Disney created an interactive version of the technology called Autonomatronics.
  - Linear Animation Generator is a form of animation by using static picture frames installed in a tunnel or a shaft. The animation illusion is created by putting the viewer in a linear motion, parallel to the installed picture frames.
- Chuckimation is a type of animation created by the makers of the television series Action League Now! in which characters/props are thrown, or chucked from off camera or wiggled around to simulate talking by unseen hands.
- The magic lantern used mechanical slides to project moving images. Christiaan Huygens was thought to have invented the magic lantern in the mid-1600s.

=== Other ===
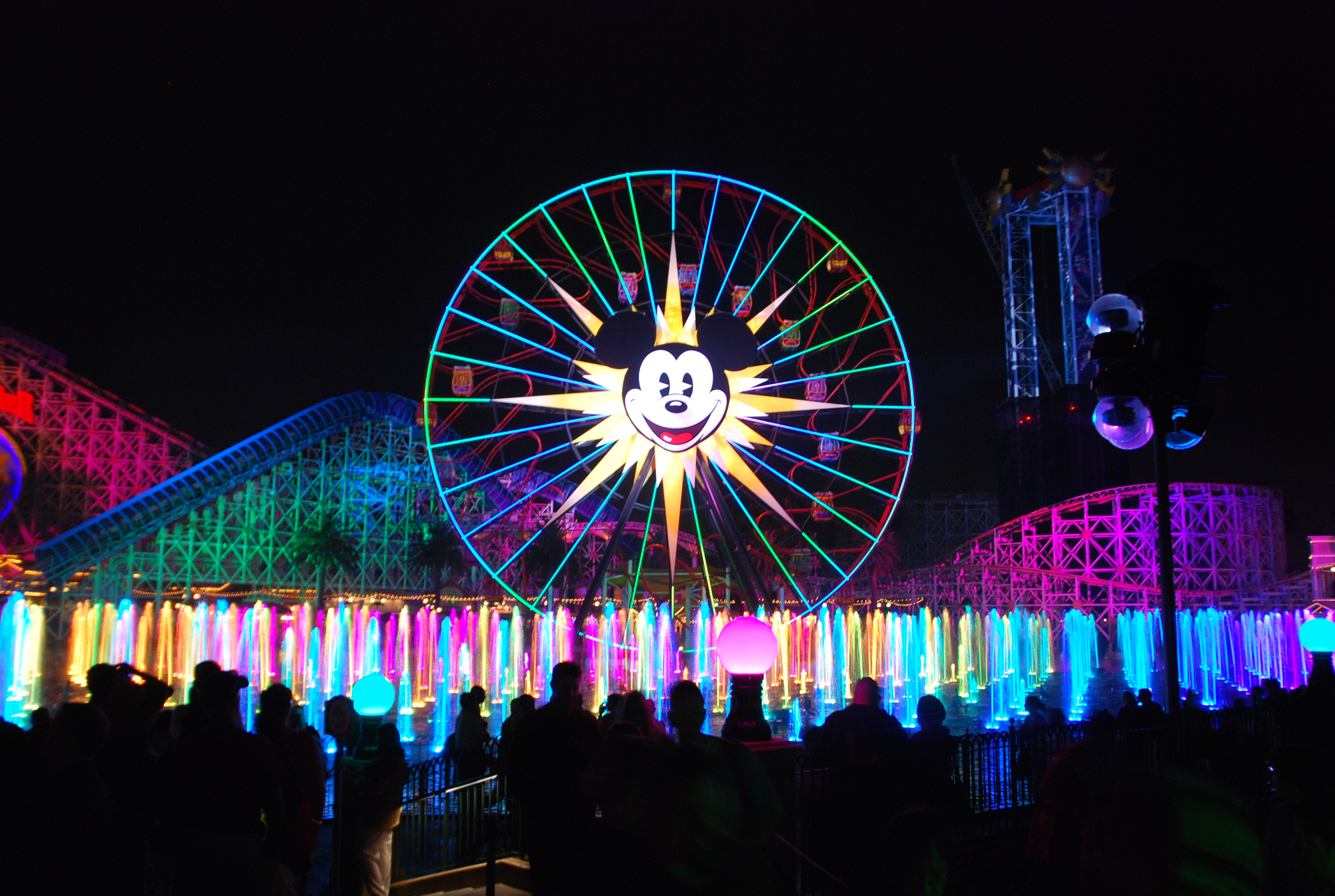
World of Color hydrotechnics at Disney California Adventure creates the illusion of motion using 1,200 fountains with high-definition projections on mist screens.

- Musical fountain: a hydrautechnical show that includes water and lights, nowadays often combined with lasers and high-definition projections on mist screens.
- Drawn-on-film animation: a technique where footage is produced by creating the images directly on film stock; for example, by Norman McLaren, Len Lye and Stan Brakhage.
- Paint-on-glass animation: a technique for making animated films by manipulating slow drying oil paints on sheets of glass, for example by Aleksandr Petrov.
- Erasure animation: a technique using traditional 2D media, photographed over time as the artist manipulates the image. For example, William Kentridge is famous for his charcoal erasure films, and Piotr Dumała for his auteur technique of animating scratches on plaster.
- Pinscreen animation: makes use of a screen filled with movable pins that can be moved in or out by pressing an object onto the screen. The screen is lit from the side so that the pins cast shadows. The technique has been used to create animated films with a range of textural effects difficult to achieve with traditional cel animation.
- Sand animation: sand is moved around on a back- or front-lighted piece of glass to create each frame for an animated film. This creates an interesting effect when animated because of the light contrast.
- Flip book: a flip book (sometimes, especially in British English, called a flick book) is a book with a series of pictures that vary gradually from one page to the next, so that when the pages are turned rapidly, the pictures appear to animate by simulating motion or some other change. Flip books are often illustrated books for children, they also are geared towards adults and employ a series of photographs rather than drawings. Flip books are not always separate books, they appear as an added feature in ordinary books or magazines, often in the page corners. Software packages and websites are also available that convert digital video files into custom-made flip books.
- Character animation
- Multi-sketch animation
- Special effects animation
- 2.5D Animation: A mix of 2D and 3D animation elements that emphasise the illusion of depth utilising the pseudo-3D effect. During the 1970s, the term "2.5D" started to gain recognition. But its background comes from anime and manga during the 1920s where theatrical stage productions were popular. Stage adaptations of well-liked anime series featured live performances by voice actors called 2.5D.

== See also ==
- Animated war film
- Animation department
- Animated series
- Anime
- Architectural animation
- Avar
- Independent animation
- International Animation Day
- International Animated Film Association
- International Tournée of Animation
- List of film-related topics
- List of years in animation
- Motion graphic design
- Society for Animation Studies
- Twelve basic principles of animation
- Wire-frame model
- Outline of animation
