= El Mono relojero =

El Mono Relojero
- Directed by: Quirino Cristiani
- Story by: Eleazar P. Maestre (adaptation)
- Based on: El Mono Relojero by Constancio C. Vigil
- Starring: Pepe Iglesias
- Music by: José Vázquez Vigo
- Production company: Estudios Cristiani
- Distributed by: Cifesa
- Release date: 2 February 1938
- Running time: 9 minutes 41 seconds
- Country: Argentina
- Language: Spanish

El Mono relojero is a 1938 Argentine animated short film directed by Quirino Cristiani. It is the only film from this director that exists up to this day, since all his other productions (including the first two animated feature films, El Apóstol (1917) and Sin dejar rastros (1918), as well as the first animated film with sound, Peludópolis (1931)) were lost in a series of fires at the facilities where the negatives and copies were stored; Sin dejar rastros was confiscated on the day of its premiere, and is believed to have been immediately destroyed. El mono relojero was saved from the fires because, by chance, the author of its script Constancio C. Vigil had a copy of his own.

The film premiered in Buenos Aires. It was intended to be the first of a series of animated adaptations of the children's books written by Vigil, but differences between him and Quirino Cristiani, who possessed a willful streak, prevented the production of subsequent installments.

El mono relojero was not especially representative of the filmography of Quirino Cristiani. The film's themes and style were clearly Vigil's, and it was one of the few directed by Cristiani to lack the element of political satire.
