= Trent Lewis =

American actor

- Born: Thomas Trent Lewis II; 16 November 1979 (age 45); West Hills, California, United States
- Occupation: Actor/Pastor

Thomas Trent Lewis II (born 16 November 1979), known professionally as Trent Lewis, is an American actor.

== Early life ==
Lewis was born in West Hills, California.

== Career ==
Lewis is best known for his role as Dr. Swank on the Syfy comedy series Outer Space Astronauts. He continues to improvise with such groups as ComedySportz and Upright Citizens Brigade Theatre.

== Filmography ==
=== Television ===
Year	Title	Role	Notes
2009	Outer Space Astronauts	Dr. Swank	9 episodes
