= PowerPoint animation =

Animation using Microsoft PowerPoint or similar program

A stick figure animation made using Microsoft PowerPoint 2016.

Microsoft PowerPoint animation is a form of animation which uses Microsoft PowerPoint and similar programs to create a game or movie. The artwork is generally created using PowerPoint's AutoShape features, and then animated slide-by-slide or by using Custom Animation. These animations can then be shared by transferring the PowerPoint file they were created in, and can be viewed with PowerPoint or Microsoft's free PowerPoint Viewer and are often exported to video formats such as mp4.

== Custom Animation ==
A screenshot showing PowerPoint 2003's Custom Animation.

A set of effects can be applied to objects in PowerPoint so that they will animate in the Slide Show. They can be added under the Custom Animation function or through the use of Visual Basic for Applications (VBA). PowerPoint 2000 and earlier versions introduced basic effects such as Appear, Dissolve, Fly In and so forth. In PowerPoint 2002/XP and later versions, the Custom Animation feature was improved, adding new animation effects grouped into four categories: Entrance, Emphasis, Exit, and Motion Paths. The effects were later modified in PowerPoint 2010.

Transitions are effects similar to Custom Animation, but are different in that they can only be applied singularly to individual slides as they change from one slide to another and are limited in options. More slide transitions were added to the selection in PowerPoint 2010.

Entrance effects can be set to objects so that they enter with animations during Slide Show. Emphasis effects animate the objects on the spot. Exit effects allow objects to leave the Slide Show with animations. Motion Paths allow objects to move around the Slide Show. Each effect contains variables such as start (On click, With previous, After previous), delay, speed, repeat and trigger. This makes animations more flexible and interactive, similar to Adobe Flash.

=== Animation Trigger ===
Animation Trigger is another feature introduced in Microsoft PowerPoint 2002/XP and the later versions (but, only supported on Macintosh since 2019, in Office 365). This feature allows animators to apply effects that can be triggered when a specific object on the Slide Show is clicked. This feature is the basis for the majority of PowerPoint games, which usually involve clicking an object.

== Games ==
Using hyperlinks and Animation Triggers, one can create games such as Jeopardy!, using the tools to maneuver from question to answer. Taking this same principle, the animator can also make more complex games similar to a dungeon game or escape-the-room game. In this format, the animator can create a domain where the player chooses to go right or left, or pick up objects, and so forth. The process takes time, but is generally cheaper and easier than using multimedia software such as Adobe Flash.

For more experienced users, Visual Basic for Applications (VBA) can be used to program animations with more flexibility.

== Drawbacks ==
Though animations can be created easily using Custom Animations provided in Microsoft PowerPoint, it may be much more tedious to complete a project in PowerPoint than in professional animation programs such as Adobe Flash due to the absence of key frames and tweening in the former. However, this limitation can be worked around with the "Morph" transition, which was introduced in PowerPoint 2019.

When effects such as Emphasis Grow/Shrink and Spin are applied to objects, they may appear to be jagged or pixelated when previewing in the slide show. In addition, excessive use of these effects may degrade the slide show's performance. PowerPoint's built in Hardware Graphics Acceleration feature does help in minimizing these setbacks, however. Graphics acceleration, though, requires a video card that supports Microsoft Direct3D. Additionally, some animations may appear different when played in older versions of PowerPoint, or not be present at all.

PowerPoint 2000 and later versions introduced macro security to help protect computers from malicious code within a PowerPoint presentation. This led to disabling all VBA or macro code by default, causing presentations containing code unable to run properly, unless the viewer adjusted their macro security settings to the Low setting. Security Warning in PowerPoint 2007 alerts the user of macros in a presentation as soon as it is opened, giving the option to run the presentation with or without the macros enabled.

PowerPoint is unavailable for Linux and other operating systems, meaning that unlike open-source alternatives such as SVG, animations are not portable across a range of computers or phones. PowerPoint animations however can be rendered with varying degrees of success through compatible tools such as LibreOffice Impress and Calligra Stage.

== Notable works ==
- Point Saber – A VR recreation of the game Beat Saber by YouTuber and game developer Emeral.
- ROCHE LIMIT: The Death of CMK – A 1,500-slide "dark, surrealist pixel art game" by architect and game developer Jack Strait.
- Don't Touch The Void! – A puzzle game by YouTuber and game developer JB Squiddy. Noted for its complex use of Visual Basic for Applications (VBA).
- The Night Shift – A game jam submission by NYU graduates Rosaita Wu and Jingyi Li, which gained subsequent traction on YouTube.
- Numberfanagram - An animated television series, tests and shorts created by Arif Khamis Yusuf (aka. Arifmetix) based on Numberblocks nowadays not made in PowerPoint anymore.
