= Jack Dempsey vs. Luis Ángel Firpo =

Boxing match

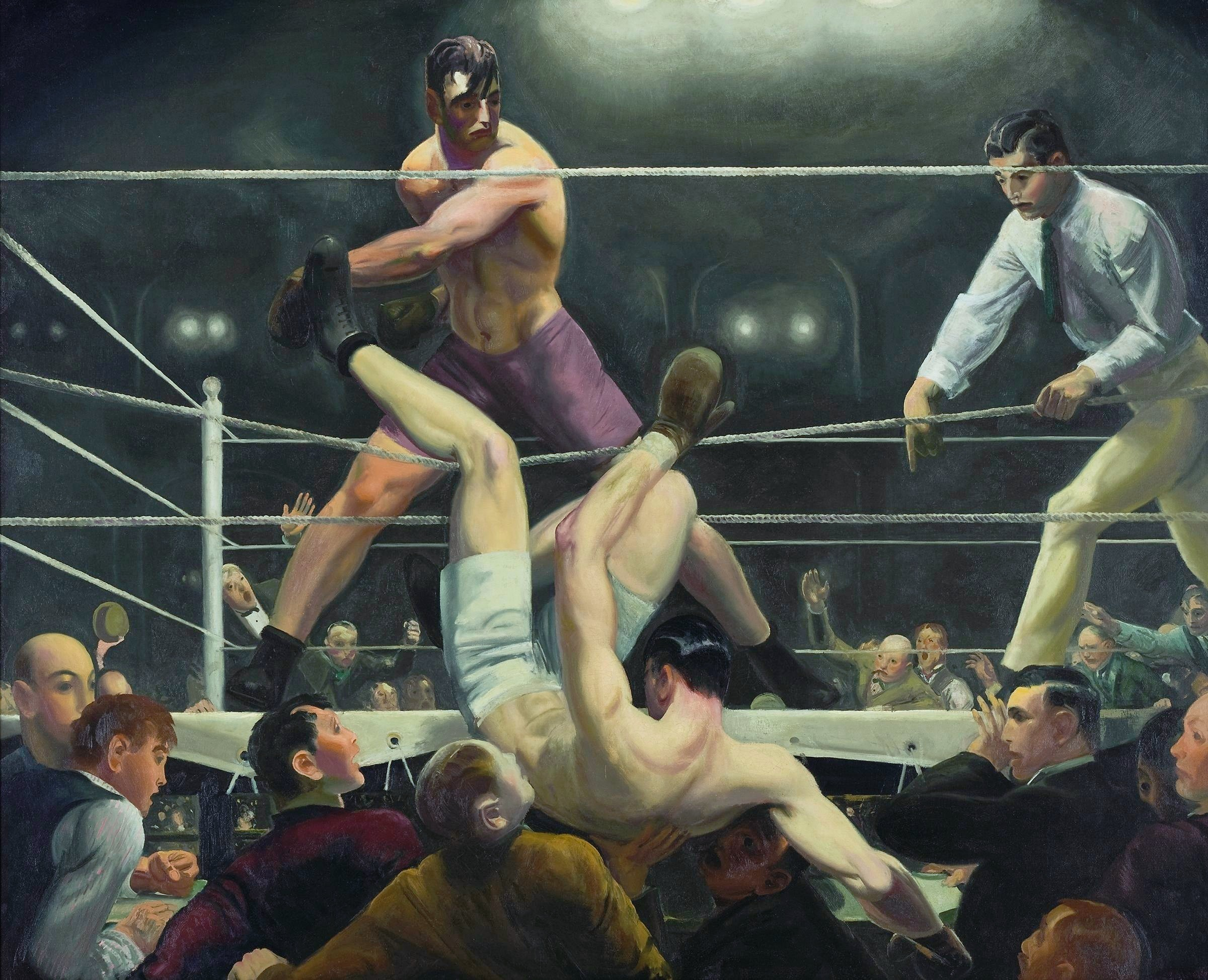
- Firpo sending Dempsey outside the ring; painting by George Bellows
- Date: September 14, 1923
- Venue: Polo Grounds, New York City, New York, U.S.
- Title(s) on the line: NBA, NYSAC, and The Ring undisputed heavyweight championship

Tale of the tape
Boxer	(United States) Jack Dempsey	(Argentina) Luis Ángel Firpo
Nickname	"The Manassa Mauler"	"El Toro Salvaje de las Pampas"
Hometown	Manassa, Colorado	Junín, Buenos Aires Province
Purse	$468,750	$156,250
Pre-fight record	61–4–9 (6) (51 KO)	25–2 (2) (21 KO)
Age	28 years, 2 months	28 years, 11 months
Height	6 ft 1 in (185 cm)	6 ft 2 1/2 in (189 cm)
Weight	192 lb (87 kg)	216 lb (98 kg)
Style	Orthodox	Orthodox
Recognition	NBA, NYSAC and The Ring undisputed Heavyweight Champion	Former South American heavyweight champion

Result
- Dempsey wins via 2nd-round KO

Jack Dempsey vs. Luis Ángel Firpo was a professional boxing match contested on September 14, 1923, for the undisputed heavyweight championship.

It was one of the most significant events in sports of the era as well as the first time that a Latin American challenged for the world heavyweight title. The bout was named Ring Magazine Fight of the Year for 1923. The painting Dempsey and Firpo by George Bellows, showing Firpo knocking Dempsey out of the ring, is an iconic piece of Americana.

== Background ==
Firpo was the first Latin American in history to challenge for the world heavyweight title. He burst onto the scene in 1922. None of the results of his from before 1922 were available to most audiences. After going 4–0 in 1922, Firpo began 1923 at Madison Square Garden knocking out former title challenger Bill Brennan in the 12th round with a right. Brennan had to be taken to the hospital afterwards for a concussion. "Dempsey never hit me any harder than this fellow," said Brennan, adding that he couldn't wear his old hat because his head was too swollen. Firpo knocked out former heavyweight champion Jess Willard in front of 100,000 spectators, a world record for boxing attendance at the time. He finally got the title shot after a win against Charley Weinert.

In anticipation for the Dempsey-Firpo bout, a Firpo sparring session drew a crowd of 12,000. The match was at the Polo Grounds, normal capacity 55,000, but an additional 20,000 seats were constructed bringing the total to 75,000 for the fight, later expanded to 83,000. The police estimated that 150,000 people showed up, including a mass extending a quarter mile in every direction around the arena.

== The fight ==
Dempsey versus Firpo took place on September 14, 1923, at the Polo Grounds in New York City. Dempsey had been champion since 1919, and Firpo was one of the top heavyweights of the world, nicknamed "El Toro de las Pampas" ("The Wild Bull of the Pampas"). The referee was Johnny Gallagher.

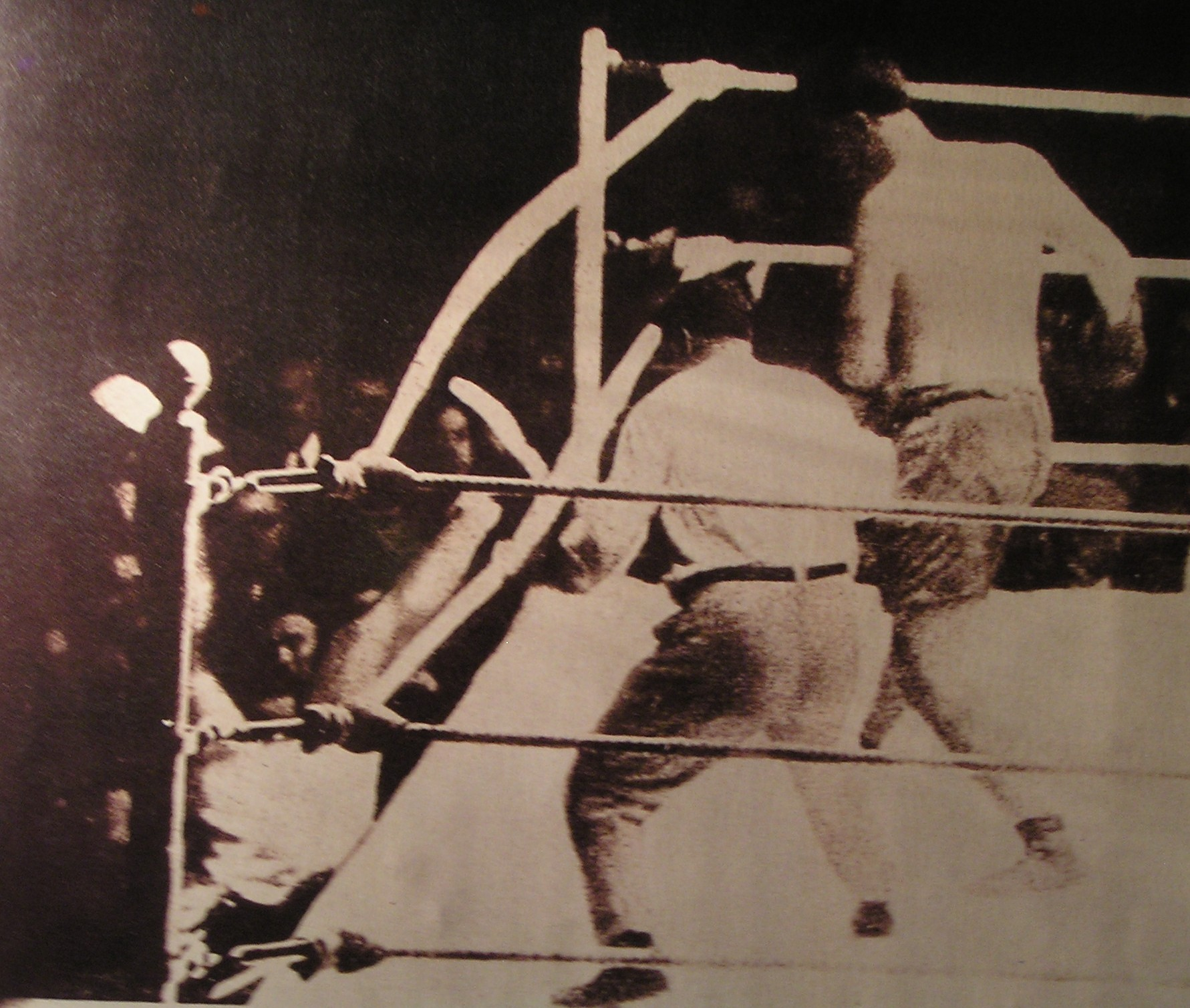
Luis Firpo throws Jack Dempsey out of the ring; this was the basis for artist George Wesley Bellows' famous portrait.

Firpo was floored seven times in the first round of the bout, before he trapped Dempsey against the ropes and launched a combination that sent the champion out of the ring. Dempsey was helped into the ring at the count of nine (in spite of having been seventeen seconds outside the ring; fighters are given a twenty-second count when they are knocked through the ropes). After getting back in the ring Dempsey took 13 consecutive shots from Firpo. In the second round Dempsey rallied and knocked out Firpo.

== Aftermath ==
Dempsey and Firpo both became icons. Dempsey later lost his Heavyweight title to Gene Tunney in two equally historic bouts (see: The Long Count Fight). He served in the military and opened a restaurant in New York before his death in 1983.

Firpo's popularity around Latin America was immeasurable. Years later, C.D. Luis Ángel Firpo, a professional football team in El Salvador was named after him. In addition, various schools, streets, and avenues across Latin America have been named after him.

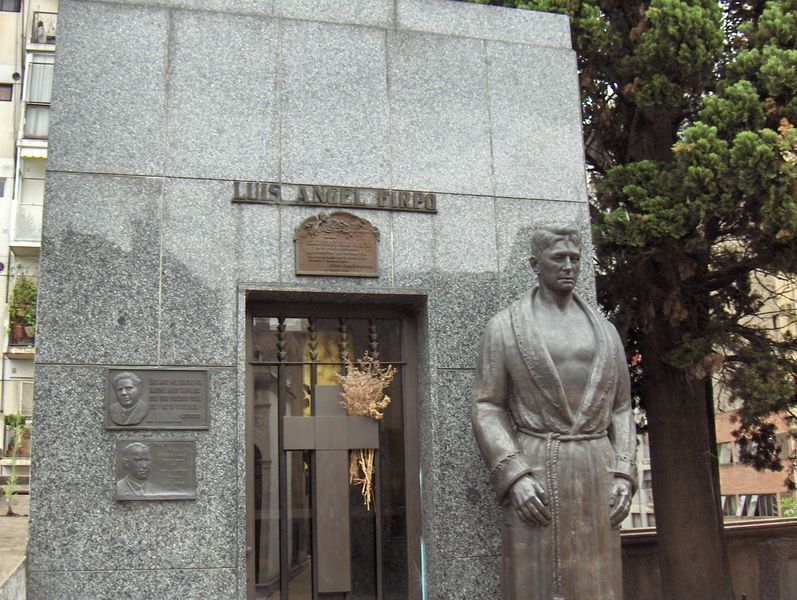
Luis Angel Firpo vault in the Cemetery of Recoleta, Buenos Aires, where his remains were interred.

Argentine boxer Oscar Bonavena also fought two great heavyweight champions, losing to Muhammad Ali and Joe Frazier, the latter for the NYSAC's version of the world heavyweight title. Ultimately, John Ruiz, an American of Puerto Rican descent, became the first boxer of Hispanic and of Latin American descent to win the world Heavyweight title, beating Evander Holyfield in 2001 for the World Boxing Association's version of the title.

Firpo died a wealthy man in 1960. His body rests in the La Recoleta Cemetery in Buenos Aires.

=== Controversies ===
Years later Gene Tunney would say in Esquire, "the Dempsey-Firpo fight was the most controversial in boxing history." Tunney attributed the result to Firpo not having a manager. "After Dempsey had been out of the ring ten seconds, any manager would have been in there, raising Firpo's hand and claiming the championship."

When Dempsey was knocked out of the ring, reporters at ringside helped him back in, a violation of the rules. Years later Dempsey would say "I was down, and if it wasn’t for the public throwing me back in there, I would have never gotten back into the ring." At the time of the fight The New York Times reported that news had falsely spread to Buenos Aires that Dempsey had been disqualified.

Dempsey was permitted to stand over the fallen Firpo and immediately knock him down again, as there was yet no rule about going to a neutral corner. The referee, Johnny Gallagher, was still supposed to prevent the fighter from scoring the knockdown by standing directly over his floored opponent. In the aftermath of the fight, Gallagher was suspended after an investigation and never refereed again. 2 months after the fight, the New York Boxing Commission adopted the neutral corner rule.

== In popular culture ==
In 1923–1924, George Bellows painted Dempsey and Firpo, depicting Firpo dropping Dempsey through the ring's ropes on their historic fight. (Although the painting seems to depict Firpo hitting Dempsey with a left, this is in fact the follow-through after Firpo's right sent Dempsey through the ropes.) In 1950, Firpo's second knockdown of Dempsey was named "the most dramatic sports moment of the (20th) century so far".

Quirino Cristiani adapted the fight in an animated short, Firpo-Dempsey (1923).

This is the fight where Clark Gable's and William Powell's characters meet in the 1934 movie Manhattan Melodrama.

In 1935, the New York Daily News asked five prominent fighters and others involved in boxing to name the greatest ring battle they ever saw. Three of them- light-heavyweight champion Bob Olin, trainer Doc Robb and Madison Square Garden announcer Clem White- responded with the Dempsey-Firpo fight.

In the play Twelve Angry Men, the seventh juror (a sports fan who believes the accused is guilty) suggests to his fellow jurors that if juror No. 8 had been "ringside at the Dempsey-Firpo fight, he'd be tryin' to tell us Firpo won" because juror No. 8 is trying to convince the other 11 jurors that the accused may not be guilty. In the 1957 movie version by Sidney Lumet, the fight is also mentioned the same way, though juror No. 7's line is cut short, only managing to say that if juror No. 8 had been "ringside at the Dempsey-Firpo fight, he'd be tryin' to tell us..." before trailing off and moving on to his next line.

In the 1957 movie The Spirit of St. Louis, Charles Lindbergh (portrayed by Jimmy Stewart) receives two film canisters, marked “Dempsey" and "Firpo.”

The fight was mentioned in Steve McQueen's The Sand Pebbles (1966) during the fight between Po-han and Ski.

The fight is referenced in the 1976 film Rocky by character Mickey Goldmill, who says he fought an opponent on the same date. Moreover, challenger Rocky Balboa floors champion Apollo Creed at the very start of the fight, just as Firpo did to Dempsey.

In the M*A*S*H episode "Tea and Empathy," a patient says to Dr. B.J. Hunnicutt, "Hey Doc, remember me?" Hunnicut replies, "Yeah, sure. I sat next to you at the Dempsey-Firpo fight".

The fight is mentioned in Julio Cortázar's short story Circe

== Undercard ==
Confirmed bouts:

Preceded by vs. Tommy Gibbons	Jack Dempsey's bouts 14 September 1923	Succeeded by vs. Gene Tunney
Preceded by vs. Charley Weinert	Luis Ángel Firpo's bouts 14 September 1923	Succeeded by vs. Farmer Lodge
