= Outer Space Astronauts =

- Genre: Sitcom; Science fiction comedy
- Created by: Russell Barrett
- Country of origin: United States
- Original language: English
- No. of seasons: 1
- No. of episodes: 5

Production
- Producers: Russell Barrett; David O. Russell; Scott Puckett
- Running time: Approx. 22 minutes

Original release
- Network: Syfy
- Release: December 8, 2009

Outer Space Astronauts is a science fiction comedy television series which aired on Syfy, created by Russell Barrett.

The main characters have live-action "real" heads connected to computer-generated and animated bodies in a completely digital environment.

The crew of astronauts travel through space on a spacecraft named the O.S.S. Oklahoma.

== Characters ==
- Commander Richard Amos (played by Adam Clinton) is the second in command, and is portrayed as the smartest and only competent member of the crew. He is constantly stymied by the crew in his efforts to complete the mission or save the ship.
- Captain Bruce Ripley (played by Russell Barrett) the ship's captain is portrayed as being lazy, obese and the dumbest of the crew who mainly occupies his time sleeping. When he is in doubt he mainly tries suicidal actions like self destructing his own ship.
- Lieutenant Sunny Hunkle (played by Stephanie Clinton) is the ship's always cheerful communications officer.
- Pilot Johnny Boothe (played by Benjamin Nurick) is the ship's leather jacket and sunglasses-wearing pilot.
- Chief Security Officer Andy Matheson (played by Laura Valdivia) is the ship's burly, violent and short-fused security officer.
- Chief Mechanic Burt Pinto (played by Stephen Millunzi) is the ship's often-angry frantic mechanic.
- Operations Officer Donna Kennedy (played by Dana Kirk (actress) is the ship's technophobe operations officer, who frequently breaks or misuses electronic equipment.
- Ka'ak (played by Jacey Margolis) is a red bodied alien who volunteered to be a crew member. The character is portrayed as being extremely naive, using broken English and constantly breaking things aboard ship due to her superior strength.
- Weapons Officer Chad Brimley (played by Anthony Bravo) is the ship's sarcastic weapons officer.
- Intern Jimmy Peck (played by Pete Burns (writer and actor) is the cheerful but moronic ship's intern.
- Kyle 14 (played by Jay Wendorff) is the ship's android and one of the few crew members that is completely animated from head to toe.
- Commander Cake (played by Rob Delaney) was the ship's commander before Richard Amos. Diagnosed with Deep Space Psychosis.
- Dr. Swank (played by Trent Lewis) is the sweaty and excitable head of the Science Department on the O.S.S. Oklahoma.

== Animation style ==
Outer Space Astronauts uses an animation technique similar to Cutout animation, which combines live-action greenscreen footage of the actors' heads with computer generated bodies. The backgrounds are 2D and sometimes 3D animation.
