= Armature (computer animation) =

An armature is a kinematic chain used in computer animation to simulate the motions of virtual human or animal characters. In the context of animation, the inverse kinematics of the armature is the most relevant computational algorithm.

There are two types of digital armatures: keyframing (stop-motion) armatures and real-time (puppeteering) armatures. Keyframing armatures were initially developed to assist in animating digital characters without relying on live performances. Animators manually pose the device for each keyframe, while the character in the animation is set up with a mechanical structure equivalent to the armature. The device is connected to the animation software through a driver program, and each move is recorded for a specific frame in time. Real-time armatures function similarly but are controlled in real-time by one or more people.

== See also ==
- Linkages
- Skeletal animation
