= Karl von Luxburg =

German diplomat (1872–1956)

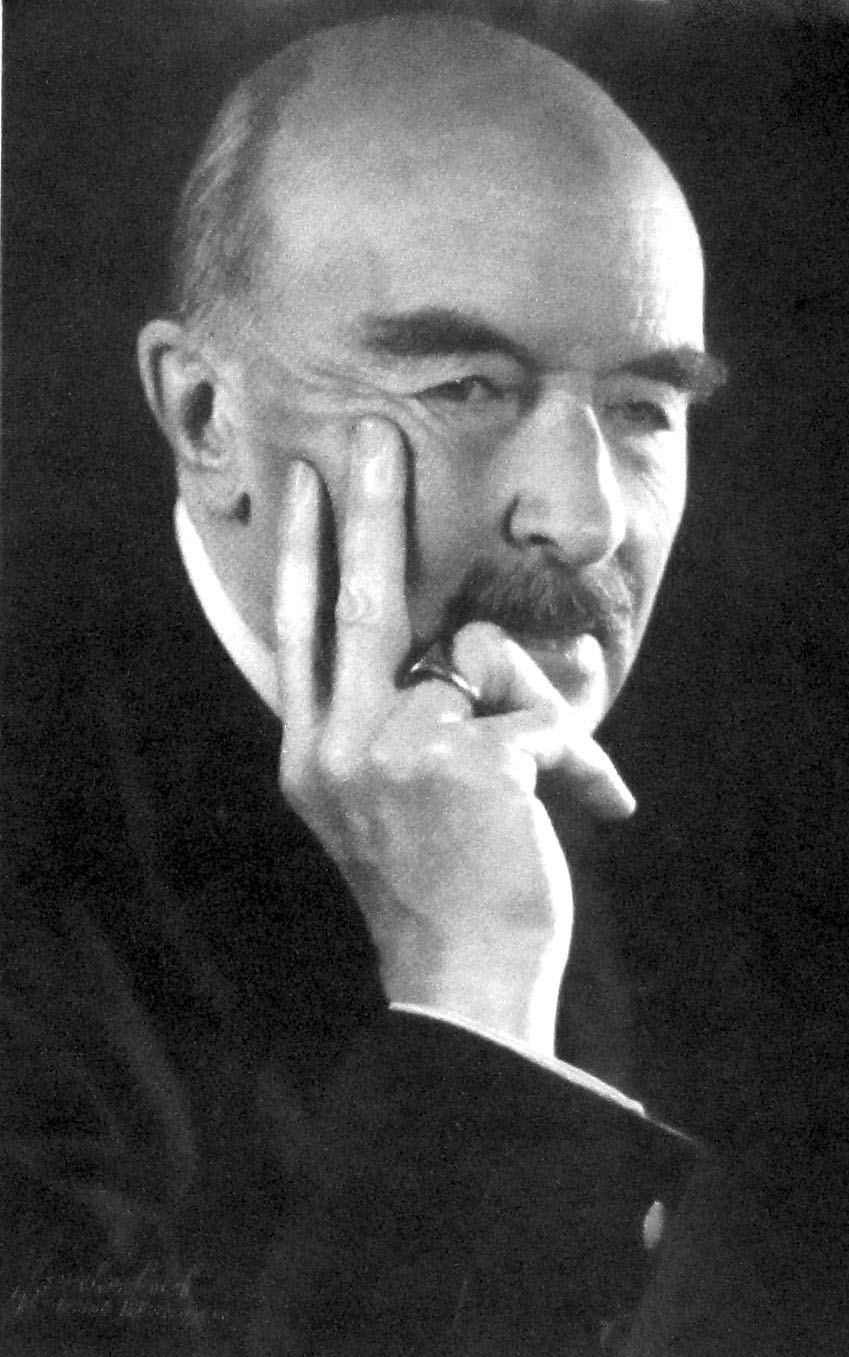
Karl Ludwig Graf von Luxburg

Karl von Luxburg (10 May 1872 in Würzburg – 2 April 1956 in Ramos Mejía, Argentina) was German chargé d'affaires at Buenos Aires, Argentina, in 1917, during World War I.

== Incident ==
In the summer of 1917, Luxburg sent secret dispatches to Berlin through the Swedish legation via Stockholm, which were made public by United States Secretary of State Robert Lansing. These dispatches urged that certain neutral Argentine ships should be "spurlos versenkt" — destroyed without a trace. They also revealed a plot to violate Brazilian sovereignty by consolidating the German settlement in Brazil. The publication of the documents resulted in the dismissal of Count Luxburg from Argentina, and the virtual entrance of Argentina into the war. Luxburg was also Minister to Uruguay, and on his dismissal from Argentina, he asked for a passport to Montevideo instead of to Berlin.
