= Sin dejar rastros =

- Directed by: Quirino Cristiani
- Written by: Quirino Cristiani
- Release date: 1918
- Running time: Unknown
- Country: Argentina
- Languages: Silent film Spanish (Castellano) intertitles

Sin dejar rastros (Spanish: "Without a Trace") is a 1918 lost Argentine animated feature film. It was written and directed by Quirino Cristiani. The film used cutout animation.

== Plot ==
The plot revolved around the recent incident involving the German commander Baron von Luxburg who sank an Argentine ship intending to frame the Entente for the act. Reports from survivors helped everyone to realize what had truly happened. This plot summary appeared in The Moving Picture World for September 21, 1918:

Under the title "Sin Dejar Rastros," the Spanish equivalent of the German "Spurlos Versenkt," a satirical picture, made up of animated cartoons, has been successfully released in Argentina. The film depicts, in a humorous vein, some of the plots engineered by Count Luxburg, the Kaiser's representative in Buenos Aires, which were exposed by our own State Department. It starts with an iinaginary description of the local German Legation, a building full of traps, underground passages, mysterious closets, infernal machines, etc., and the final shows "Juan Pueblo" (the common people) delivering an energetic kick to the Hun minister, who is swallowed by the waves and disappears spurlos versenkt.

== Reception ==
The film was not as successful as Cristiani's previous film El Apóstol from 1917, since Sin dejar rastros was confiscated by the Ministry of Foreign Affairs by order of President Hipólito Yrigoyen. It is unknown if any copies of the film exist, and is considered a lost film.

== See also ==
- List of animated feature-length films
