= Cutout animation =

Form of stop-motion animation

Video about making cutout animation, in Spanish with English subtitles

Cutout animation is a form of stop-motion animation using flat characters, props and backgrounds cut from materials such as paper, card, stiff fabric or photographs. The props would be cut out and used as puppets for stop motion. The world's earliest known animated feature films were cutout animations (made in Argentina by Quirino Cristiani), as is the world's earliest surviving animated feature Die Abenteuer des Prinzen Achmed (1926) by Lotte Reiniger.

== Overview ==
The technique of most cutout animation is comparable to that of shadow play, but with stop motion replacing the manual or mechanical manipulation of flat puppets. Some films, including Die Abenteuer des Prinzen Achmed, also have much of their silhouette style in common with shadow plays. Cutout animation pioneer Lotte Reiniger studied the traditions of shadow play and created several shadow play film sequences, including a tribute to François Dominique Séraphin in Jean Renoir's film La Marseillaise (1938).

While sometimes used as a relatively simple and cheap animation technique in children's programs (for instance in Ivor the Engine), cutout animation has also often been used as a highly artistic medium that distinguishes itself more clearly from hand-drawn animation.

Cutout animation can be made with figures that have joints made with a rivet or pin or, when simulated on a computer, an anchor. These connections act as mechanical linkage, which have the effect of a specific, fixed motion. Similar flat, jointed puppets have been in use in shadow plays for many centuries, such as in the Indonesian wayang tradition and in the "ombres chinoises" that were especially popular in France in the 18th and 19th century. The subgenre of silhouette animation is more closely related to these shadow shows and to the silhouette cutting art that has been popular in Europe especially in the 18th and 19th centuries.

While many cutout animation puppets and other material is often purposely-made for films, ready-made imagery has also been heavily used in collage/photomontage styles, for instance in Terry Gilliam's famous animations for Monty Python's Flying Circus (1969-1975).

Lotte Reiniger, and movies like Twice Upon a Time (1983), used backlit animation, where the source of light comes from below. Animators like Terry Gilliam use light coming from above.

Cutout techniques were relatively often used in animated films until cel animation became the standard method (at least in the United States). Before 1934, Japanese animation mostly used cutout techniques rather than cel animation, because celluloid was too expensive.

Today, cutout-style animation is frequently produced using computers, with scanned images or vector graphics taking the place of physically cut materials. South Park is a notable example of the transition, since its pilot episode was made with paper cutouts before switching to computer software.

== Short films ==
- Edwin S. Porter used "jumble captions" in How Jones Lost His Roll, The Whole Dam Family and the Dam Dog, and Everybody Works But Father (all 1905). The Whole Dam Family also includes an animated silhouette of a dog with firecrackers attached to its tail.
- Lotte Reiniger made animated silhouette sequences for Die Schöne Prinzessin von China (1917), Apokalypse (1918. lost) and Der Verlorene Schatten (1920)
- Reiniger created her own short silhouette films Das Ornament des Verliebten Herzens (1919), Amor und das Standhafte Liebespaar (1920), Der Fliegende Koffer (1921), Der Stern von Bethlehem (1921), Aschenputtel (1922), Das Geheimnis der Marquise (1922, advertisement for Nivea), Dornröschen (1922) and Barcarole (1924, advertisement for Mauxion), before creating her first feature. After Die Abenteuer des Prinzen Achmed she continued to make dozens of shorts. From 1938 to 1982 she worked and lived in the United Kingdom.
- Noburo Ofuji worked primarily with cutout animation, for instance using chiyogami (Japanese colored paper) in 馬具田城の盗賊 (Burglars of "Baghdad" Castle) (1926).
- Le merle (1958) by Norman McLaren is a combination of (white) cut-outs and (pastel) backgrounds to the music of the French folksong "Mon Merle".
- The Little Island (1958), by Richard Williams, a combination of both traditional animation and paper cut-out elements
- Famous Studios' Modern Madcaps episode Bouncing Benny (1960) used paper cutout characters by animators Place and Feuer to create shadow effects
- How Death Came to Earth (1971), by Ishu Patel
- Tabi (1973) and Shijin no Shôgai (1974), two cutout animations by Kihachirō Kawamoto (who was otherwise primarily a puppet animator)
- The Miracle of Flight, (1974) by Terry Gilliam
- Before co-founding Art And Animation Studio with her husband, Dagmar Doubková created several short cutout animations, such as Oparádivé Sally (1976) (broadcast in the US as About Dressy Sally on Nickelodeon's Pinwheel, Perníkový dědek (Gingerbread Man) (1977),Sbohem, Ofélie (Goodbye Ophelia) (1978), Královna Koloběžka první (Queen Scooter First) (1981), The Impossible Dream (1983) and Shakespeare 2000 (1988)
- The Spirit of Christmas (1992-1995) by Trey Parker and Matt Stone

== Feature films ==
An example of cutout animation, produced at the UK's National Media Museum

- El Apóstol (1917) by Italian-Argentine cartoonist Quirino Cristiani, was also the world's first animated feature film.
- The Adventures of Prince Achmed (1926) by Lotte Reiniger is a silhouette animation using armatured cutouts with backgrounds that were variously painted or composed of blown sand and even soap.
- No. 12, also known as Heaven and Earth Magic by Harry Everett Smith, completed in 1962, utilizes cut-out illustrations culled from 19th century catalogs.
- Soyuzmultfilm's Lefty (1964) and Go There, Don't Know Where (1966), directed by Ivan Ivanov-Vano
- René Laloux's early films made use of armatured cutouts, while his first feature La Planète sauvage (Fantastic Planet) (1973) is a rare example of unarmatured cutout animation
- The opening sequence of For Love and Gold (1966), a film by Italian director Mario Monicelli, features cutout animation, made by the Italian Emanuele Luzzati
- Karel Zeman made several animated movies using cutout animation (Krabat – The Sorcerer's Apprentice) (1978) as well as live action movies combined with cutout animation (The Fabulous Baron Munchausen)
- Twice Upon a Time (1983), an animated movie directed by John Korty and produced by George Lucas, uses a form of cutout animation, which the filmmakers called "Lumage", that involved prefabricated cut-out plastic pieces that the animators moved on a light table
- South Park: Bigger, Longer & Uncut (1999) and Imaginationland: The Movie (2008) use computer animation to imitate cutout animation.
- Strange Frame (2012) relies primarily on an innovative cutout style combined with both traditional and 3D elements
- The Breadwinner (2017) uses digital animation to imitate cutout animation in the storyworld sequences.

== Television series ==
- John Ryan's Captain Pugwash (1957–1966, 1974–1975) used cardboard cutouts that were manipulated with levers in front of painted backgrounds while filmed real-time
- Oliver Postgate and Peter Firmin's Smallfilms created and produced Alexander the Mouse (1957–1958, lost), Ivor the Engine (1959, 1975–1977) and Noggin the Nog (1959–1965, 1982). Their initial animation system used magnets on cutouts to move the figures around during real-time broadcasting.
- Ten short episodes of an early black and white animated adaptation of Les Schtroumpfs (The Smurfs) (1961–1967) by TVA Dupuis used cutout animation for many of its characters.
- Monty Python's Flying Circus (1969) contained animation sketches with paper cut-out, as animated by Monty Python member Terry Gilliam
- David McKee's King Rollo (1980)
- Pigeon Street (1981) was created by Alan Rogers and Peter Lang, who would both go on to create animations for programmes like Words and Pictures, Numbertime, Rosie and Jim and Hotch Potch House
- the intro and outro of Charlie Chalk (1987) featured cutout animation, while the episodes featured stop motion puppetry
- Jan Sarkandr Tománek created several cutout animation series, including Medvěd 09 (Bear 09) (1988), Balabánci (1993), Dobrodružství pod vrbami (adaptation of The Wind in the Willows) (1999)
- Art And Animation Studio combined puppet and cutout animation in Hajadla (2006)
- Blue's Clues (1996–2006) used cutout animation for many of its characters
- South Park (since 1997) used construction paper cutouts in its first episode before switching to PowerAnimator and, later, Maya, with the visual style intended to resemble this technique of animation.
- Angela Anaconda (1999–2002) used black-and-white photographs of faces that were superimposed on computer-generated bodies and backgrounds
- Bill Cosby's Little Bill (1999–2004) used a mix of cutout animation and flash animation
- Lauren Child's Charlie and Lola (2005–2008) featured a collage style that mashed together 2D Flash animation, paper cutout, fabric design, real textures, photomontage, and archive footage
- Outer Space Astronauts (2009) blended live-action footage of actors' heads on computer-generated bodies against 2D and/or 3D backgrounds, a style that is associated with cutout animation
- Uncle Grandpa (2013–2017) featured photographic cutout character "the Giant Realistic Flying Tiger"

== Music videos ==
Jim Blashfield used cutout animation in his music videos for Talking Heads' And She Was (1985), Paul Simon's Boy in the Bubble, Michael Jackson's Leave Me Alone (1989, winning a Grammy Award, a Cannes Golden Lion and an MTV Award), Tears for Fears' Sowing the Seeds of Love (1989, winning two MTV Awards) and others.

The video for Röyksopp's Eple (2003), features a specific kind of cutout animation, continuously zooming out and panning through many old (still) pictures that are seamlessly combined. The technique is a variation of the Ken Burns effect, which has often been used in documentary films to add motion to still imagery, but rarely as a standalone animated production.

Other music videos featuring cutout animation include Skindred's "Pressure" (2006), Serj Tankian's "Lie Lie Lie" (2007), B.o.B's "Nothing on You" (2009), and Redbone's "Come and Get Your Love".

== Internet ==
- The humour animation site JibJab primarily uses cutout animation from photographs
- Joel Veitch uses SWF cutout animation style on his website Rathergood.com
- Hallmark Cards' characters Hoops and Yoyo appear in E-cards and cutout-animated cartoons since 2003

== Video games ==
- Nintendo's Paper Mario series (since 2000) use cutout characters to explore the various locations in or around the Mushroom Kingdom. The commercial for the Nintendo 3DS game Paper Mario: Sticker Star (2012) also used cutout animation.
- Sega's Sonic 4: Episode I and II game opening logo used cutout animation with 3D model sprites of modern Sonic and Tails.
- The mobile game Sega Heroes features cutout sprite characters.
- PlayStation's PaRappa the Rapper features cutout characters, including its spin-off Um Jammer Lammy.

== See also ==
- List of stop-motion films
