= Firpo-Dempsey =

1923 animated short

- Directed by: Quirino Cristiani
- Written by: Quirino Cristiani
- Produced by: Federico Valle
- Release date: 1923
- Running time: Unknown
- Country: Argentina
- Language: Silent film

Firpo-Dempsey is a 1923 animated short, directed by Quirino Cristiani. It is a parody of the boxing match between Jack Dempsey and Argentine boxer Luis Ángel Firpo. At the time the picture was very popular with Argentine audiences. Today the film is considered lost.

== See also ==
- Jack Dempsey vs. Luis Ángel Firpo
