= Peludópolis =

1931 film

- Directed by: Quirino Cristiani
- Music by: José Vázquez Vigo
- Release date: September 18, 1931 (Argentina)
- Running time: 80 minutes
- Country: Argentina
- Language: Spanish

Peludópolis is a 1931 Argentine animated film directed by Quirino Cristiani. It was released on 18 September 1931 in Buenos Aires. The film was released with a Vitaphone sound-on-disc synchronization system soundtrack, making the film generally credited as the first animated feature film with sound. The film is now considered a lost film.

== Plot ==
The story revolves around Argentine president, Hipolito Yrigoyen, nicknamed by his detractors "Peludo" (Armadillo), sailing as a pirate on his ship Peludópolis (Peludo city, which represented Argentina) to the island of Quesolandia, while constantly being harassed by hungry sharks (the dissident Radicals). Peludópolis had been stolen by Yrigoyen from her former owner, the "Pelado" ("The Bald", nickname of the dissident Radical leader and ex-president Marcelo T. de Alvear), and is eventually recovered by Argentine military forces.

== Production ==
A year into production for the film, president Yrigoyen was ousted by a military coup d'état, and production on the film halted.

Still wanting this film to see the light of day, Cristiani began de-emphasizing Yrigoyen and the sharks and started adding in the generals that overthrew Yrigoyen as the heroes. During this time, Cristiani added an everyman character named Juan Pueblo to act as the moral center of the film. After the delay and plot rearrangement, Peludópolis was finally released on 16 September 1931.

The single most notable feature of Peludópolis was that it was the first animated film to be released with sound. Cristiani added this feature partway through production, before the plot had been rearranged, using the Vitaphone sound-on-disc system to record the sound that was to play alongside the film. While sound-on-film systems did exist at the time, Argentine theaters were simply unable to support the system. Peludópolis included multiple songs during the film, none of which are known to exist.

Instead of drawing on cels which would then be laid over a background, the drawings were made on cardboard, a technique Cristiani by then had perfected, and then cut out and laid over the background in the same way as with cels.

== Preservation ==
In both 1957 and 1961, fires broke out where the then-retired Cristiani stored his films, destroying most, if not all, of his work. Among the lost materials included the only prints of Peludópolis left in existence, as well as the soundtrack, making it a lost film. A making-of feature of the film, along with several stills and posters for the film, are still in existence.

== See also ==
- List of lost films
- El Apóstol
