= Rushing Roulette =

- Directed by: Robert McKimson
- Story by: David Detiege
- Produced by: David H. DePatie; Friz Freleng
- Edited by: Lee Gunther
- Music by: Bill Lava
- Animation by: Warren Batchelder; Bob Matz; Norm McCabe; Manny Perez; Don Williams
- Layouts by: Dick Ung
- Backgrounds by: Tom O'Loughlin
- Color process: Technicolor
- Production company: DePatie–Freleng Enterprises
- Distributed by: Warner Bros. Pictures; The Vitaphone Corporation
- Release date: July 31, 1965 (USA)
- Running time: 6 min.
- Country: United States

Rushing Roulette is a 1965 Warner Bros. Merrie Melodies cartoon directed by Robert McKimson. The short was released on July 31, 1965, and stars Wile E. Coyote and the Road Runner. It was the second Road Runner cartoon directed by someone other than Chuck Jones, who had almost exclusively used the characters since their debut in 1949 (the first was 1965's The Wild Chase, directed by Friz Freleng). McKimson directed one other Road Runner cartoon the following year, Sugar and Spies.

Unlike the ten Rudy Larriva-directed Road Runner shorts after Run, Run, Sweet Road Runner (which featured a series of pre-recorded music cues that didn't follow the action on-screen as closely), Rushing Roulette featured an entirely original score by Bill Lava.

The title of the cartoon is a play on Russian roulette.

== Summary ==
1. As the cartoon opens, Wile E. tries snagging the Road Runner with a lasso, but is merely dragged along due to the bird's speed, and ultimately collides with a cactus.

2. Wile E. sets up a fake photo booth which has a cannon behind it. When the Road Runner actually gets a real picture taken at the booth, Wile E., puzzled, then decides to pose for his own picture but is shot (in the smoke, a picture of the charred coyote floats past).

3. Wile E. outfits himself with a pair of ACME Sproing Boots, but is startled by the Road Runner's trademark "Beep, Beep!" and ends up falling down a canyon. However, he bounces back up due to his boots, only to bash his head on a boulder hanging over the edge of a cliff, which drops off of the edge. Both Wile E. and the boulder fall to the ground. Wile E. manages to push the boulder aside, only for the force of the shove to back Wile E. into the wall of the canyon, pressing the springs on his boots against it, causing him to spring forward onto the ground right underneath the falling boulder, which flattens him (with the springs sticking out from underneath).

4. Wile E. puts Ajax Stix-All Glue on the pavement to cause the Road Runner to get stuck. His plan backfires when he accidentally steps on the sticky pavement. The Road Runner arrives and startles Wile E. with his "Beep, Beep!", so much so that the pavement is lifted off of the ground (with Wile E. still attached) and lands face down.

5. Wile E. tries to catch up to the Road Runner with a handcar. This backfires when the Road Runner gets his own handcar, pushes Wile E.'s handcar to the edge of a cliff, and finally startles him off the cliff's edge with another "Beep, Beep!", and the Coyote plummets to the ground.

6. Wile E. uses a tall sunbeam to roast the Road Runner, but the bird uses a mirror to reflect the sunbeam back and burn the foundation of the scaffold on which Wile E. is standing, causing the entire structure to collapse. On the ground, the mirror cracks, and so do Wile E.'s eyes.

7. Wile E. sets up a piano rigged with explosives under an awning, accompanied by a wooden signpost advertising "Learn to play the piano for free" - and the eager Road Runner dashes to the piano. He tries to play "Believe Me If All Those Endearing Young Charms" (a repeat gag from the Private Snafu short "Booby Traps", as well as "Ballot Box Bunny" and "Show Biz Bugs", both directed by producer Friz Freleng) but keeps playing the wrong note. Wile E. shoos him and demonstrates to him how to play the right note but in the ill-fated attempt to do so, the piano explodes, leaving the dazed Coyote with the keys in his teeth continuing to play.

8. Standing atop a tall, narrow rocky platform between two sloped canyon walls, Wile E. pushes a boulder off of it in an attempt to squash the Road Runner on the pavement below, but the boulder misses and rolls up the wall of the canyon, then rolls back and collides with the base of his platform, and then rolls up the other wall and back again, continuing to eat away at his platform until he's at pavement level. He manages to duck into a manhole right before getting hit by an oncoming truck, but the boulder lands on top of the manhole, preventing his escape.

9. Finally, Wile E. uses a personal helicopter to drop an anvil on the Road Runner from above, but as the Road Runner enters a tunnel, Wile E.'s helicopter crashes into the wall above the tunnel; as he drops to the ground, so does the anvil, which lands right on his head. Wile E. is then struck by a Greyhound bus, which turns out to be driven by the Road Runner, who delivers one last "Beep, Beep!" as the cartoon ends.

== Crew ==
- Director: Robert McKimson
- Story: David Detiege
- Animation: Bob Matz, Manny Perez, Warren Batchelder, Norm McCabe, Don Williams
- Layout: Dick Ung
- Backgrounds: Tom O'Loughlin
- Film Editor: Lee Gunther
- Voice Effects: Mel Blanc, Paul Julian
- Music: Bill Lava
- Produced by: David H. DePatie and Friz Freleng
