= War and Pieces =

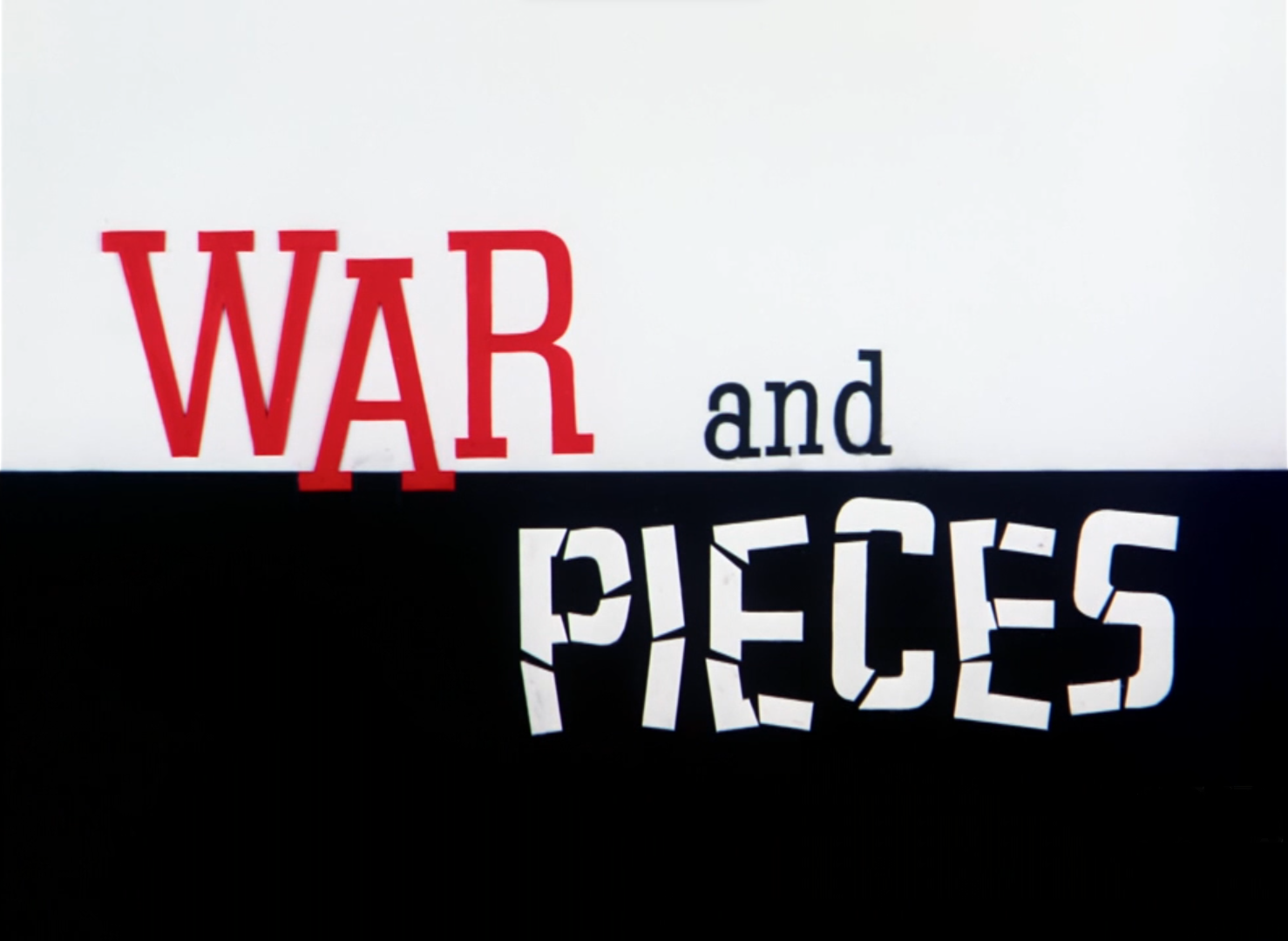
- Title card
- Directed by: Chuck Jones; Maurice Noble (co-director)
- Story by: John Dunn
- Edited by: Treg Brown
- Music by: Bill Lava
- Animation by: Ken Harris; Richard Thompson; Bob Bransford; Tom Ray
- Layouts by: Dave Rose
- Backgrounds by: Philip DeGuard
- Color process: Technicolor
- Production company: Warner Bros. Cartoons
- Distributed by: Warner Bros. Pictures
- Release date: June 6, 1964
- Running time: 6 minutes

War and Pieces is a 1964 Warner Bros. Looney Tunes theatrical animated short directed by Chuck Jones. The short was released on June 6, 1964, and stars Wile E. Coyote and the Road Runner. It was the last Looney Tunes/Merrie Melodies cartoon directed by Chuck Jones until 1979's Freeze Frame.

The title is a pun on the Leo Tolstoy novel War and Peace.

== Plot ==
1. Wile E. Coyote ("Caninus nervous rex") attempts to hurl a hand grenade at the Road Runner ("Burn-em upus asphaltus"), but it rebounds off a saguaro, and explodes on the Coyote. He walks away, planning his next scheme.

2. Wile E. is at another cliff, attempting to use a bow with a pulley to shoot himself at the Road Runner, with his tail being tied by a rope attached to the pulley. The pulley rope then rips the lower part of his hide off, exposing him in his underwear, and with him hanging onto the bow until it breaks. He then lands feet first on a large rock just a bit down the bottom of the cliff. Wile E. walks off in relief, until the rock breaks and falls down to the ground, taking Wile E. with it.

3. Wile E. attempts to use a hydraulic press activated by an electric eye, when the Road Runner attempts to run through the light at the eye, the hydraulic presses can crush him after he passes. The Road Runner stops in front of the eye. The Coyote gets impatient and runs at the Road Runner, but the Road Runner walks through the eye, activating the hydraulic presses, flattening Wile E.

4. Wile E. paints himself with ACME Invisible Paint. He hears the Road Runner beeping, jumps onto the road, but the beeps were from a truck, which runs over the Coyote. Wile E. staggers off a cliff into a pond. The splash causes Wile E. to be visible again, and he lies down on the sea floor, injured. A fish swims by and looks at him, but the Coyote shoos it away by showing a "GET LOST!" sign at the fish.

5. Wile E. uses a double-barreled shotgun as a look-through attraction called "Secrets of a Harem". The Road Runner looks through the holes of the shotgun while turning a handle, while Wile E. prepares to fire the shotgun. The Road Runner, however, seems to be enjoying an actual peep show. Wile E. pushes him away to see for himself, only for the shotgun to fire into his face.

6. Wile E. throws a grappling hook with a rope straight up at the cliff. The hook gets caught on something, and the Coyote climbs the rope. The hook is not caught on a cliff, but a cloud above, the hook lets go of the cloud and tears it open, causing lightning to strike the Coyote, who slides down to the ground.

7. The Coyote rides a rocket up the cliff, but the shape of the cliff causes the rocket to go the wrong way and sends the Coyote into the ground. After barreling underground and through the Earth's core, he ends up in China, where he meets a Chinese Road Runner wearing a conical hat and Chinese wooden slippers. The Coyote attempts to catch him, but the Chinese Road Runner subdues him with a gong. The Coyote falls back down the hole toward the desert. He flies up the hole and falls face first to the ground. The Chinese Road Runner pops his head out of the hole and ends the cartoon with a "Beep-beep!" noise with Chinese characters, which translate "The End, old Chinese proverb".

== Crew ==
- Co-Director: Maurice Noble
- Story: John Dunn
- Animation: Ken Harris, Richard Thompson, Bob Bransford & Tom Ray
- Layouts: Dave Rose
- Backgrounds: Philip DeGuard
- Film Editor: Treg Brown
- Music: Bill Lava
- Produced by David H. DePatie
- Directed by Chuck Jones

== Home media ==
The film is available on the Looney Tunes Collector's Choice: Volume 3 Blu-ray.
