= Chaser on the Rocks =

- Directed by: Rudy Larriva
- Story by: Tom Dagenais
- Produced by: David H. DePatie; Friz Freleng; Herbert Klynn
- Edited by: Joe Siracusa
- Music by: Bill Lava
- Animation by: Hank Smith; Virgil Ross; Bob Bransford
- Layouts by: Don Sheppard
- Backgrounds by: Jules Engel; Anthony Rizzo
- Color process: Technicolor
- Production companies: DePatie–Freleng Enterprises; Format Productions
- Distributed by: Warner Bros. Pictures; The Vitaphone Corporation
- Release date: December 25, 1965 (USA)
- Running time: 6:30
- Country: United States

Chaser on the Rocks is a 1965 Warner Bros. Merrie Melodies theatrical animated short directed by Rudy Larriva. The short was released on December 25, 1965, and stars Wile E. Coyote and the Road Runner. The title is a pun on the phrase: "Water on the Rocks".

In this film, Wile sees a mirage vision of an oasis, after looking at the Sun.

== Plot ==
The cartoon begins with Wile E. Coyote chasing the Road Runner. Road Runner zooms off, and Wile stops. He looks up at the sun, and Road Runner enters and does the same. After a shot of the hot sun, the Road Runner zooms offscreen again. The Coyote sees Road Runner in an oasis and jumps in. The oasis turns out to be a mirage, and Wile falls between two cliffs. After landing, he sees another oasis, but he thinks that this one is a mirage as well. It turns out that this oasis is real, as Wile falls in. As he sinks, Wile holds up one hand as he counts to three as he drowns.

1. Wile paints a TNT stick to look like a glass of lemonade. He puts a straw and a lemon slice in it as well. Road Runner approaches and drinks the "lemonade". Wile E. presses on the detonator, but nothing happens. Wile takes the "lemonade" and starts to drink it when it explodes!

2. We see a sign that says "FREE BIRD BATH". The camera zooms out to show Wile E. setting up the birdbath. Road Runner approaches, and we see Wile on a diving board attached to a rock above the birdbath. Road Runner reads the sign and jumps into the birdbath. Wile jumps off the diving board, hoping to catch the Road Runner. Road Runner jumps out of the birdbath, and Wile gets stuck in it. After this, Wile counts to three with his fingers again, and then falls off a cliff. While falling, he gets out of the birdbath, which ends up landing on him, flattening him like a coin.

3. Crawling through the desert, still suffering from the heat, Wile sees an emergency fire hose, which he tries to use to get a drink. He hardly gets any water from it at first, but the Road Runner turns it on maximum. The hose gets out of control, sending the Coyote flying. He sticks his finger in the nozzle, but it gets stuck. The water coming out of the hose gets it unstuck, and sends him falling off a cliff.

4. Finally, we see Wile setting up a "DETOUR" sign pointing to a tunnel with a cannon at the end. He hears the Road Runner approaching, and enters the tunnel. Road Runner enters the tunnel, and Wile sees him. He fires the cannon, and the cannonball misses Road Runner and hits a rope which sends the cannonball back through the tunnel. Wile enters the tunnel to see what happened, and he (possibly) ends up swallowing the cannonball. He enters the cannon, and Road Runner fires it. Wile E. goes through the tunnel, hits the rope, goes back through the tunnel and into the cannon, which Road Runner fires again.
