= The Solid Tin Coyote =

- Directed by: Rudy Larriva
- Story by: Don Jurwich
- Produced by: David H. DePatie; Friz Freleng
- Edited by: Joe Siracusa
- Music by: Bill Lava
- Animation by: Hank Smith; Virgil Ross; Bob Bransford
- Layouts by: Don Sheppard
- Backgrounds by: Jules Engel; Anthony Rizzo
- Color process: Technicolor
- Production companies: DePatie–Freleng Enterprises; Format Films
- Distributed by: Warner Bros. Pictures
- Release date: February 19, 1966 (US)
- Running time: 6 minutes
- Country: United States

The Solid Tin Coyote is a 1966 Warner Bros. Looney Tunes cartoon directed by Rudy Larriva. The short was released on February 19, 1966, and stars Wile E. Coyote and the Road Runner.

In this film, Wile creates a robotic coyote and uses it against the Road Runner.

== Plot ==
The cartoon opens with Wile E. trying to capture the Road Runner by covering the road with tar, but the bird simply runs directly over it. He stops himself from leaping into the tar (in anticipation of the Road Runner being stuck), and accidentally walks into the road where the tar is located to ascertain where his enemy has gone. Wile E. manages to free himself from the tar pit, but is now stuck in the bucket of tar. The coyote hops across the road, stuck in the bucket, until he has to outrun a truck coming from that direction. Ultimately, he fails to do so when he gets himself stuck in the tar pit a second time, and then gets flattened.

Hoping to get the Road Runner to run into it, Wile E. places a mirror on a curve on the very edge of a mountain, but soon discovers that his reflection is mocking him. To figure out where the "reflection" is coming from, the coyote snakes around the mirror to the side and discovers nothing there. Puzzled, the coyote retracts his neck, and soon suffers gravity due to his location in thin air. But in the dump where he falls is an inspiration: Wile E. scavenges a wealth of spare parts and takes them offscreen where construction noises are heard. Road Runner is left curious as to what his rival is doing and looks around the rock Wile is working behind. However, curiosity quickly turns to outright terror when Wile E. unveils his creation: a robotic coyote at least five times as tall as himself. Using a dial-operated remote control, Wile E. gives the robot the following commands (with electric bolts coming out of robot's ears before executing each command):

WALK: The robot does so, but will not stop or change direction to avoid smashing his creator. Therefore... STOP/HALT: However, the robot fails to stop, crushing Wile E. underfoot.

LOWER HAND for Wile E. to climb on, then LIFT HAND for him to get a bird's eye-view of the landscape. HUNT: Robot gets "on his mark" and "set", hears the Road Runner coming, and starts chasing him as he passes by (a rendition of "Charge" is played every time the robot begins the chase). The Road Runner is uncharacteristically shocked at the sight of his opponent on the robot, and Wile E. is soon in striking distance to issue STRIKE. The robot turns his hand around (unfortunately for Wile E., it is the one he is standing on) and attempts to crush the Road Runner, but misses each time and ends up flattening the Coyote like a pancake.

Standing between the robot's ears, Wile E. hears the Road Runner coming and orders the robot to ATTACK, but the electric bolts from its ears roast him to a crisp.

Wile E. adds fangs to the robot's mouth, gives the order to HUNT, and the chase is on again. This time, the robot miraculously succeeds in catching the Road Runner. However, Wile E. fails to recognize the sensitive personality of his creation. He enters the command to EAT, but when this fails to prompt the robot, he fine-tunes one of the knobs to add the word STUPID. The robot promptly opens its mouth and throws Wile E. inside, giving Road Runner a chance to escape. Crawling out of one of the robot's ears, and obviously irked, Wile E. flatly commands ONE MORE TRY, YOU IDIOT! Again, the robot starts after Road Runner, who is now standing on the other side of a collapsed road. Horrified, Wile E. tries vainly to stop the robot (TURN, STOP, HALT, BACK, WHOA, REVERSE, HEEL), but all commands go unanswered and both he and the robot fall into the chasm, destroying the robot upon impact with the ground.

== Home media ==
This cartoon is available on the Supergenius Hijinks DVD.
