= Clippety Clobbered =

- Directed by: Rudy Larriva
- Story by: Tom Dagenais
- Produced by: David H. DePatie; Friz Freleng
- Edited by: Al Wahrman
- Music by: Bill Lava
- Animation by: Hank Smith; Virgil Ross; Bob Bransford
- Layouts by: Don Sheppard
- Backgrounds by: Jules Engel; Anthony Rizzo
- Color process: Technicolor
- Production companies: DePatie–Freleng Enterprises; Format Productions
- Distributed by: Warner Bros. Pictures; Vitagraph Company of America
- Release date: March 12, 1966 (US)
- Running time: 6 minutes
- Country: United States

Clippety Clobbered is a 1966 Warner Bros. Looney Tunes theatrical animated short directed by Rudy Larriva. The short was released on March 12, 1966, and stars Wile E. Coyote and the Road Runner.

In this film, Wile experiments with a chemistry set.

== Plot ==
Wile E. Coyote waits at his mailbox. He looks up to see a U.S. Mail helicopter which drops a big box with a parachute attached to it. As Wile E. holds out his arms to catch the box, Road Runner runs by and taunts him long enough so that he forgets about the descending package which lands on top of his head. After some more taunting from Road Runner which causes his backside to be pricked by a cactus, Wile E. opens his package to reveal a chemistry set.

Wile E. wastes no time as he pours red liquid back and forth between two beakers until its color vanishes completely. He pours the invisible liquid into a bucket marked "Invisible Paint", then paints himself invisible with it (he is outlined for the viewers to keep track of his presence). Wile E. gets into position to catch Road Runner near the side of a cliff, but the Road Runner runs into him and knocks him off. For good measure, the Road Runner paints a giant boulder and pushes it off the cliff; it lands on top of the unsuspecting Coyote.

For his second and final try with the invisible paint, Wile E. builds a brick wall and quickly paints it upon seeing the Road Runner coming towards him. Watching from behind a boulder, he is stunned when Road Runner runs right through the invisible wall. The Coyote attempts to do the same, but smashes headfirst into the wall. As he attempts to get up, a brick falls on top of his head and knocks him out.

Back at his chemistry lab, Wile E. adds a chemical to a beaker filled with blue liquid, creating a bounceable substance. After a successful test, Wile E. covers himself entirely with the blue liquid, forming a bounceable rubber suit. Road Runner comes down the road and passes Wile E. who runs towards an opposite wall and bounces off of it, moving towards his prey. However, Road Runner ducks before he can be caught, sending Wile E. bouncing uncontrollably off rocks, cliffsides and down into a canyon. He bounces off the ground and high into the air to get back up to the top of the canyon, but part of the rubber suit gets caught on a branch and the whole thing tears off the Coyote. Relieved to be rid of the bounce liquid but then remembering that he is still in midair, he plummets to the ground on his face.

Returning to the chemistry set, Wile E. reads about "Hand Jets" from a book called Space Science. Wile E. creates his own hand jet by mixing an orange chemical and pouring it into a spray can like container. A quick test is successful, so off he goes after Road Runner with the hand jet. After crashing into an "Acme Garment Co." truck and exiting out its back, he sees the Road Runner head into a train tunnel and follows him in. Suddenly, he sees what appears to be a train headlight coming towards him; Wile E. turns around to escape but sees that it's the Road Runner wearing a coal miner's hat. Wile E. turns around and resumes his chase with the Road Runner who also turns back the other way. They enter the tunnel again and Wile E. sees another approaching headlight. Thinking it's the Road Runner trying to trick him again, Wile E. continues full speed ahead... and smashes into a real train! Plastered to the front of the train, the dismayed Coyote looks towards the camera and the shot zooms into his eyes. Inside, the Road Runner speeds toward the audience, and waves goodbye before speeding off into the distance.

== Release ==
Clippety Clobbered was released March 12, 1966.
