= The Wild Chase =

1965 film directed by Friz Freleng

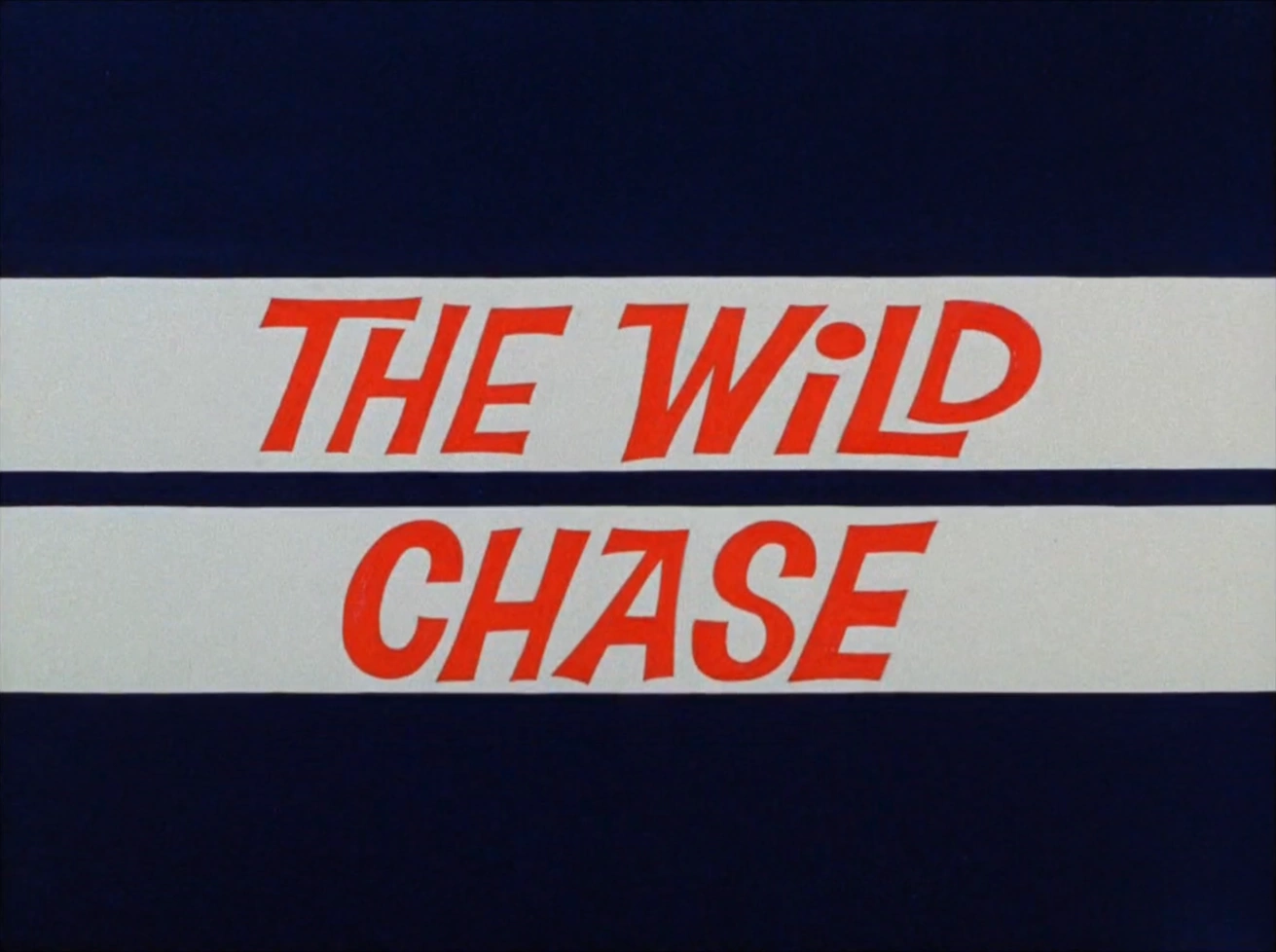
- Title card
- Directed by: Friz Freleng; Hawley Pratt
- Produced by: David H. DePatie; Friz Freleng
- Starring: Mel Blanc; Paul Julian
- Edited by: Lee Gunther
- Music by: Bill Lava
- Animation by: Norm McCabe; Don Williams; Manny Perez; Warren Batchelder; Laverne Harding
- Layouts by: Dick Ung
- Backgrounds by: Tom O'Loughlin
- Color process: Technicolor
- Production company: DePatie–Freleng Enterprises
- Distributed by: Warner Bros. Pictures; The Vitaphone Corporation
- Release date: February 27, 1965
- Running time: 6:29
- Country: United States
- Language: English

The Wild Chase is a Warner Bros. Merrie Melodies short directed by Friz Freleng and Hawley Pratt. The short was released on February 27, 1965, and stars Speedy Gonzales, Sylvester and Wile E. Coyote and the Road Runner.

== Plot ==
Speedy Gonzales, the fastest mouse in all Mexico, races against the Road Runner, the Texas road burner, in the Mexico–United States border zone. During the race, Sylvester the Cat and Wile E. Coyote join forces in an attempt to catch their speedy opponents, with predictable results. Often they mistakenly end up injuring each other in comical fashion.

Initially, Wile E. Coyote descends precipitously from a cliff in his endeavor to capture the Road Runner, an occurrence subsequently replicated by Sylvester subsequent to an encounter with Speedy. Their strategy to launch rocks at their competitors goes awry, resulting in the rocks descending upon themselves. Subsequently, they covertly position iron pellets beneath birdseed and cheese, attaching a grenade to a magnet on a roller skate; however, this scheme concludes with the grenade detonating in Wile E.'s visage. Moreover, their attempt to dislodge a flat rock from a cliff results in both characters plunging over the edge. In their endeavor to demolish a culvert, they mishandle the detonator, precipitating the detonation of the dynamite upon themselves. Finally, they employ a rocket car to pursue the racers, ostensibly achieving victory, but are subsequently disqualified as only Speedy Gonzales and the Road Runner are duly registered participants.

The cartoon culminates with Sylvester and Wile E. being propelled into the atmosphere as the rocket car erupts in a pyrotechnic display.

== Crew ==
- Co-Director: Hawley Pratt
- Story: Friz Freleng & Cal Howard
- Animation: Norm McCabe, Don Williams, Manny Perez, Warren Batchelder, Laverne Harding
- Layout: Dick Ung
- Backgrounds: Tom O'Loughlin
- Film Editor: Lee Gunther
- Voice Characterizations: Mel Blanc
- Music: Bill Lava
- Produced by: David H. DePatie and Friz Freleng
- Directed by: Friz Freleng

== Production notes ==
This cartoon represents the sole Wile E. Coyote and Road Runner production directed by Friz Freleng or Hawley Pratt, who were predominantly known for their work on Speedy Gonzales and Sylvester the Cat cartoons (Wile E. Coyote and the Road Runner had largely been the province of Chuck Jones until his 1963 firing; Format Films' Rudy Larriva would take over that series after this). It serves as a notable crossover between the Sylvester/Speedy and Wile E. Coyote/Road Runner series. This short is unique as the only Speedy Gonzales cartoon to feature Wile E. Coyote and the Road Runner, and conversely, the only Wile E. Coyote/Road Runner short to include Speedy Gonzales and Sylvester.

Additionally, it marks the final appearance of Speedy Gonzales with Sylvester the Cat and the last classic-era cartoon directed by Freleng. The content of the cartoon primarily comprises recycled animation and comedic gags from earlier Wile E. Coyote and Road Runner productions.

== Home media ==
The Wild Chase is available on the Looney Tunes Golden Collection: Volume 4 Disc 3.
