= Looney Tunes: Cartoon Conductor =

2008 video game

- North American box art
- Developer: Amaze Entertainment
- Publisher: Eidos Interactive
- Platform: Nintendo DS
- Release: EU: June 6, 2008; NA: June 10, 2008; AU: December 10, 2008
- Genre: Rhythm
- Mode: Single-player

Looney Tunes: Cartoon Conductor (known as Looney Tunes: Cartoon Concerto in Europe and Australia) is a Nintendo DS game developed by Amaze Entertainment and published by Eidos Interactive.

== Plot ==
The game starts with Bugs Bunny standing in front of a stage, explaining that the Tasmanian Devil has destroyed the classical and culturally-sourced soundtracks of the Looney Tunes and Merrie Melodies cartoons, so it's up to the player to conduct a new orchestra to remake and restore the Looney Tunes cartoons' music. Bugs then will teach the player about how to conduct the orchestra, leading into the game.

== Gameplay ==
Players must conduct an orchestra to perform at a classic Looney Tunes cartoon. To start the orchestra, players must tap three times on the touch screen, like a real conductor. To make the orchestra perform perfectly, players must tap or drag the notes at the right times; if not the performance meter will go down. If the performance meter depletes completely, the orchestra will be canceled and the game will end. There are four difficulties: Apprentice (easy), Conductor (normal), Maestro (hard), and a fourth, unlockable mode and the hardest one: Looney. This mode is about as hard as Maestro mode, but unlike the other difficulties, the player must play through the intervals instead of just watching them.

Each time the player taps or drags a note, the player will gain a varying number of points. The number of points depends on the player's accuracy. There are four accuracy levels in the game: Gold, Silver, Normal, and Miss. The score level, scores, and combos also affects the performance meter, the audience, the cartoon, and the musical grade. There are five musical grades: S+, S, A, B and C. The musical grade can be guessed by the amount of applause when the cartoon ends.

== Track list ==
Melody title	Composer
"Orpheus in the Underworld: Can-Can/The Infernal Gallop"	Jacques Offenbach
"Flight of the Bumblebee"	Nikolai Rimsky-Korsakov
"Ride of the Valkyries"	Richard Wagner
"The Planets: Mars, The Bringer of War"	Gustav Holst
"Symphony No. 5"	Ludwig van Beethoven
"Hungarian Rhapsody No. 2"	Franz Liszt
"Carmen: Torreador March"	Georges Bizet
"Mexican Hat Dance"	Jesús González Rubio
"Toccata and Fugue"	Johann Sebastian Bach
"Barber of Seville Overture"	Gioachino Rossini
"William Tell Overture"	Gioachino Rossini
"Concerto for Two Horns"	Georg Philipp Telemann
"The Nutcracker: Dance of the Reed Flutes" (used as a main theme)	Pyotr Ilyich Tchaikovsky

=== Voice cast ===
- Joe Alaskey as Bugs Bunny, Daffy Duck, Sylvester the Cat, Speedy Gonzales, Barnyard Dawg, Marvin the Martian, and Road Runner
- Bob Bergen as Porky Pig and Tweety Bird
- Jim Cummings as Taz
- Bill Farmer as Foghorn Leghorn and Mouse
- Maurice LaMarche as Wile E. Coyote and Yosemite Sam
- Billy West as Elmer Fudd

== Reception ==
Reception

Aggregate score
Aggregator	Score
Metacritic	67/100

Review scores
Publication	Score
1Up.com	B
Destructoid	2.5/10
GameSpot	6.5/10
GameZone	7.8/10
IGN	6.8/10
Nintendo Power	6.5/10

Cartoon Conductor received "mixed or average" reviews according to the review aggregation website Metacritic.
