= Paul Smith (animator) =

American animator and director

- Born: Paul J. Smith; March 15, 1906; Nahma Township, Michigan, U.S.
- Died: November 17, 1980 (aged 74); Van Nuys, California, U.S.
- Employer(s): Winkler Pictures (1926-1930); Harman-Ising Productions (1930-1933); Leon Schlesinger Productions (1933-1940); Walter Lantz Productions (1940-1946, 1950-1972); United Productions of America (1946-1950)
- Spouse: Mildred Mankameyer (m. 1940)
- Children: 1
- Relatives: Frank Smith (brother), Hank Smith (brother), Charles Martin Smith (nephew)

Paul J. Smith (March 15, 1906 – November 17, 1980) was an American animator and director.

== Biography ==
Smith began as a cel painter for Walt Disney's unit at Winkler Pictures in August 1926, then moved up to an animator; he was one of the animators who stayed with Winkler. On May 5, 1928, when all the Oswald the Lucky Rabbit cartoons by Winkler were completed, Smith left the payroll, leaving with Hugh Harman and Rudolf Ising to work on the Looney Tunes and Merrie Melodies series. Alongside collaborator Friz Freleng, he left Harman-Ising Productions for Leon Schlesinger Productions, continuing to work on the series until 1940.

Smith eventually moved to Walter Lantz Productions. By 1953, Smith was promoted to director after the Lantz studio was able to build up enough staff for a second unit, eventually becoming the lead director of the Woody Woodpecker shorts along with Don Patterson, Alex Lovy, Jack Hannah and Sid Marcus. Smith's direction is often regarded as "meat and potatoes", as he didn't innovate his style beyond the traditional string of gags. By the late 1960s, Smith became the sole director of the Lantz studio's output: the cartoon series Woody Woodpecker, Chilly Willy, and The Beary Family. Smith stayed with Lantz until the studio was closed in 1972.

Smith died in Van Nuys, California on November 17, 1980. He was the brother of animators Frank Smith and Hank Smith and the uncle of actor and film director Charles Martin Smith.
