= Charles Martin Smith =

American actor and director (born 1953)

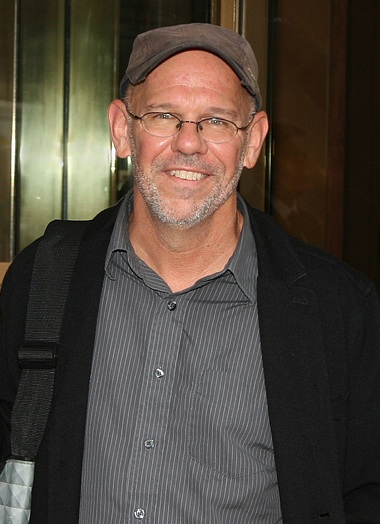
- Smith at the 2008 Toronto International Film Festival
- Born: October 30, 1953 (age 72); Van Nuys, California, U.S.
- Occupations: Actor; director; writer
- Years active: 1971–present
- Spouse: Ursula Martin (divorced)
- Children: 1
- Father: Frank Smith
- Relatives: Paul Smith (uncle); Hank Smith (uncle)

Charles Martin Smith (born October 30, 1953) is an American actor, film and television director and screenwriter, long based in British Columbia, Canada.

His breakout role was as Terry "The Toad" Fields in George Lucas' film American Graffiti (1973), which he reprised for its sequel More American Graffiti (1979). He subsequently had notable roles in The Spikes Gang (1974), The Buddy Holly Story (1978), Starman (1984), The Untouchables (1987), Deep Cover (1992), And the Band Played On (1993), Speechless (1994) and Deep Impact (1998). After starring in the 1983 film Never Cry Wolf, a biopic of Canadian environmentalist Farley Mowat, Smith moved to British Columbia, where he has since resided.

Smith made his directorial debut with the comedy horror film Trick or Treat (1986). His subsequent films include Air Bud (1997), Dolphin Tale (2011), Dolphin Tale 2 (2014) and A Dog's Way Home (2019). He received Genie Award nominations for Best Director and Best Screenplay for The Snow Walker (2003), and BAFTA Scotland Award for Best Feature Film for Stone of Destiny (2008). He has also been nominated for seven Leo Awards.

== Biography ==
=== Early life ===
Smith was born in Van Nuys, California. His father, Frank Smith, was a film cartoonist and animator, while his uncle Paul Smith was an animator as well as a director for the Walter Lantz Studios. Smith spent three years of his youth in Paris, where his father managed the English-language branch of a French animation studio. He received his high school diploma from Grover Cleveland High School in Reseda, California. He attended California State University, Northridge where he earned a B.A. in Theatre.

=== Acting background ===
Smith was discovered by a talent agent while acting in a school play, Man of La Mancha. After a few years of working in film and television, he landed the role of Terry "The Toad" Fields in George Lucas's 1973 film American Graffiti, a role he reprised in the film's 1979 sequel, More American Graffiti.

In 1973, he and American Graffiti co-star Cindy Williams appeared together in an episode of Love, American Style titled "Love and the Time Machine".

In 1974, he starred with Ron Howard in The Spikes Gang, filmed in Spain, along with Lee Marvin and Gary Grimes, and in 1978, he earned a starring role in Cotton Candy, directed by Howard.

In 1975, he auditioned for the role of Luke Skywalker in Lucas's 1977 film Star Wars, which eventually went to Mark Hamill.

Smith played one of Buddy Holly's bandmates in The Buddy Holly Story, a race car driver in Disney's Herbie Goes Bananas, and the starring role as a scientist in Never Cry Wolf. His work in Starman, as Mark Shermin, a SETI member sympathetic to the title character's plight, was also lauded. In 1979 Smith was cast alongside Barney Martin as the lead in Norman Lear's last television series concept, McGurk: A Dog's Life, which never progressed beyond the pilot.

Another role was in "Banshee", an episode of The Ray Bradbury Theater that costarred Peter O'Toole and Jennifer Dale. He also appeared in the episode "Boys! Raise Giant Mushrooms in Your Cellar". One of his later starring roles was in "The Beacon", an episode of The Twilight Zone where he starred with Martin Landau and Giovanni Ribisi in an early role.

He was in The Untouchables, where he played Oscar Wallace, an accountant who suggests indicting Al Capone on tax evasion'. After this, he co-starred in The Hot Spot and Deep Cover, and in the mid-1990s, he appeared in films such as Speechless, I Love Trouble, and Perfect Alibi.

Smith portrayed Dr. Harold Jaffe in the 1993 HBO film And the Band Played On. In 1995, he performed in the TV miniseries Streets of Laredo.

He also appeared in The Beast and also provided the voice of Renfield in the Goosebumps: Escape from Horrorland in 1996 and in a minor role in the big budget Deep Impact in 1998. He played a major character in the made-for-television movie Blackout Effect.

More recently, he has appeared in mini-series such as P.T. Barnum, Kingdom Hospital and The Triangle as well as the feature film Lucky You directed by Curtis Hanson. In 2009, he played a featured role, Sheriff Golightly, in the second episode of season two of the TV series Fringe.

=== Never Cry Wolf (1983) ===
Smith devoted almost three years to filming Never Cry Wolf, adapted from a memoir by environmentalist Farley Mowat. Smith said, "I was much more closely involved in that picture than I had been in any other film. Not only acting, but writing and the whole creative process." He also found the process difficult. "During much of the two-year shooting schedule in Canada's Yukon and in Nome, Alaska, I was the only actor present. It was the loneliest film I've ever worked on." During the filming, he became so enamored of the Northwest that he decided to relocate to Vancouver, British Columbia, where he has resided since the mid-1980s.

Carroll Ballard, director of Never Cry Wolf, asked Smith to write much of the narration for the film. Smith also performed in a lengthy scene with wolves and caribou in which he was entirely naked. While working on this production, Smith formed a friendship with the author, Farley Mowat, which lasted until Mowat's death in 2014.

=== Directing ===
Along with his acting career, since the mid-1990s Smith has increasingly focused on his work behind the camera both as a writer and director. His first film as director was the camp horror story Trick or Treat (1986) for Dino De Laurentiis, in which he also appeared. In 1992, he directed and acted in Fifty/Fifty, a movie filmed in Malaysia which also starred Robert Hays and Peter Weller. He was one of the directors of the TV series Space: Above and Beyond (1995) as well as the director of the initial episode ("Welcome to the Hellmouth") that launched the TV series Buffy the Vampire Slayer (1997). He next directed the successful feature film Air Bud (Disney, 1997), and two TV miniseries for Hallmark Entertainment, Roughing It, starring James Garner as Mark Twain, (2001) and Icon (2005), starring Patrick Swayze, Michael York and Patrick Bergin. He directed numerous episodes of the Canadian television series DaVinci's Inquest, and wrote and executive produced The Clinic, a film about a veterinary clinic for Animal Planet in 2003.

In 2003, he wrote and directed the acclaimed Canadian feature film The Snow Walker for Lions Gate Films, based on a story by Farley Mowat, which marked a return to the Arctic for Smith and garnered nine Genie Award nominations including Best Picture, Best Adapted Screenplay, and Best Director for Smith.

In 2007, Smith wrote and directed the British/Canadian co-production Stone of Destiny for Mob Films, and Infinity Features, starring Charlie Cox, Robert Carlyle and Kate Mara. Stone of Destiny was the closing Gala Presentation for the 2008 Toronto International Film Festival. His next film was Dolphin Tale for Alcon Entertainment. The film, based on a true story, stars Harry Connick Jr., Ashley Judd, Morgan Freeman, Kris Kristofferson, Nathan Gamble and Cozi Zuehlsdorff, and was released on September 23, 2011, by Warner Bros. To date, the film has grossed over $70 million at the domestic box office and over $100 million worldwide.

He returned to write and direct the sequel, Dolphin Tale 2. He based his original script on various true-life events that have occurred at the Clearwater Marine Hospital, including the dramatic rescue of a baby dolphin named "Hope" that coincidentally happened during the wrap party of the first film, with many of the film's cast and crew watching. The entire cast returned to take part, and the movie was released by Warner Bros on September 12, 2014.

== Filmography ==
=== Film ===
Year	Title	Role	Notes
1972	The Culpepper Cattle Co.	Tim Slater	
1972	Fuzz	"Baby"	
1973	Pat Garrett and Billy the Kid	Charlie Bowdre	
1973	American Graffiti	Terry "The Toad" Fields	
1974	The Spikes Gang	Tod	
1975	Rafferty and the Gold Dust Twins	Alan Boone	
1976	No Deposit, No Return	Longnecker	
1977	The Curious Case of the Campus Corpse	Barney	
1978	The Buddy Holly Story	Ray Bob Simmons	
1979	More American Graffiti	Terry "The Toad" Fields	
1980	Herbie Goes Bananas	Davy "D.J." Johns	
1983	Never Cry Wolf	Farley Mowat / Tyler	
1984	Starman	Mark Shermin	
1986	Trick or Treat	Mr. Wimbley	Also directed
1987	The Untouchables	Oscar Wallace	
1989	The Experts	Bob Smith	
1990	The Hot Spot	Lon Gulick	
1992	Deep Cover	DEA Agent Gerry Carver	
1992	Boris and Natasha	Hotel Clerk	Also directed
1992	Fifty/Fifty	Martin Sprue	Also directed
1994	I Love Trouble	Rick Medwick	
1994	Speechless	Kratz	
1995	Perfect Alibi	Franklin Dupard	
1996	The Final Cut	Captain Weldon Mamet	
1996	Wedding Bell Blues	Oliver Napier	
1997	Air Bud	—N/a	Director
1998	Deep Impact	Dr. Marcus Wolf	
1998	Hoods	Gun Dealer	(uncredited)
2000	Here's to Life!	Ned	
2002	Dead Heat	Morty	
2002	Touching Wild Horses	Charles Thurston	
2003	The Snow Walker	—N/a	Director & Writer
2005	Left Behind: World at War	Vice President John Mallory	
2007	Still Small Voices	Burton Hayes	
2007	Lucky You	Roy Durucher	
2008	Jack and Jill vs. the World	Carlin	
2008	Stone of Destiny	—N/a	Director & Writer
2011	Dolphin Tale	—N/a	Director
2014	Dolphin Tale 2	George Hatton	Also directed & writer
2019	A Dog's Way Home	—N/a	Director
2020	A Gift from Bob	—N/a	Director

=== Television ===
Year	Title	Role	Notes
1971	The Brady Bunch	Ronnie	Episode "The Wheeler-Dealer"
1971	Monty Nash	Bellhop	Episode "The Visitor"
1972	Room 222	Paul "Harpo" Harris	Episode "You Don't Know Me, He Said"
1973	Love, American Style	Julius	Episode "Love and the Blue Plate Special/Love and the Man of the Year/Love and the Time Machine" (segment "Love and the Time Machine")
1973	Chase	"Little Bits"	Episode "Sizzling Stones"
1974	The Streets of San Francisco	Russell Jamison	Episode "Blockade"
1974	The Rookies	Bobby Lewis	Episode "Death at 6 A.M."
1974	Petrocelli	Frankie	Episode "A Covenant with Evil"
1975	Lucas Tanner	Rod Jernigan	Episode "Those Who Cannot, Teach"
1976	Baretta	Harold	Episode "Shoes"
1977	The Life and Times of Grizzly Adams	Theodore "Teddy" Roosevelt	Episode "The Tenderfoot"
1980	When the Whistle Blows	Jimmy	Episode "Love Is a Four-Letter Word"
1985	The Twilight Zone	Dr. Dennis Barrows	Episode "The Beacon/One Life, Furnished in Early Poverty" (segment "The Beacon")
1986-1989	The Ray Bradbury Theater	Douglas Rogers / Hugh Fortnum	Episodes "Boys! Raise Giant Mushrooms in Your Cellar!" (Fortnum) and "Banshee" (Rogers)
1993	Partners	"Grave Squad" Lawyer	TV short
1993	The Untouchables	Special Prosecutor Thomas Dewey	Episode "Attack on New York"
1993	Tales from the Crypt	Colin	Episode "Half-Way Horrible"
1993	Picket Fences	Lyman Pike	Episode "Blue Christmas"
1994	L.A. Law	Dale Hardy	Episode "Dead Issue"
1994	Northern Exposure	Roger Brewster (Satan)	Episode "The Robe"
1995	Take Out the Beast	The Biorobot	TV short
1995	The Outer Limits	Spencer Deighton	Episode "Blood Brothers"
1995	The X-Files	Dr. Osbourne	Episode "F. Emasculata"
1999	The New Woody Woodpecker Show	Marty	Episode "Pinheads/The Chilly Show/Silent Treatment"
2000-2001	Family Law	Mr. Chilton	Episodes "The Gay Divorcee" and "Going Home"
2001	Ally McBeal	Mayor Horn	Episode "Nine One One"
2004	Kingdom Hospital	Earl Swinton	Episode "Thy Kingdom Come"
2005-2006	Da Vinci's City Hall	Joe Friedland / Mike Franklin	Also directed 3 episodes
2006	Law & Order: Special Victims Unit	Sheriff Bartley	Episode "Infiltrated"
2007	Drive	Mr. Bright	Episodes "No Turning Back", "Let the Games Begin", "Partners", and "The Starting Line"
2009	Leverage	Glenn Leary	Episode "The Beantown Bailout Job"
2009	Fringe	Sheriff Golightly	Episode "Night of Desirable Objects"
2010	Psych	Roy Kessler	Episode "Not Even Close... Encounters"
2015	Motive	Rick Wyatt	Episode "Frampton Comes Alive"

==== TV films and miniseries ====
Year	Title	Role	Notes
1973	Go Ask Alice	Jim	
1976	Law of the Land	Dudley	
1978	Cotton Candy	George Smalley	
1979	A Dog's Life	Tucker	
1993	And the Band Played On	Dr. Harold Jaffe	
1994	Roswell	Sheriff Wilcox	
1995	Brothers' Destiny	Merriman	
1995	Streets of Laredo	Ned Brookshire	
1996	The Beast	Schuyler Graves	
1997	Dead Silence	Roland W. Marks	
1998	Blackout Effect	Henry Drake	
1999	P.T. Barnum	Beach	
1999	The Apartment Complex	Gary Glumley	
2002	Roughing It	Platt	
2004	The Last Casino	Barnes	
2005	Icon	Doctor	Also directed
2005	The Triangle	Captain Jay	
2025	This Time	Red Burns	
