= Frank Smith (animator) =

American cartoon animator and film director

- Born: August 31, 1911; Gladstone, Michigan, U.S.
- Died: February 23, 1975 (aged 63); Los Angeles, California, U.S.
- Occupations: Cartoon animator, film director
- Children: Charles Martin Smith
- Relatives: Paul Smith (brother); Hank Smith (brother)

Frank A. Smith (August 31, 1911 – February 23, 1975) was an American cartoon animator and film director.

He was the father of actor and film director Charles Martin Smith, and the brother of animator and director Paul Smith and animator Hank Smith.

== Biography ==
Born in Gladstone, Michigan, Smith left home in his teens with the dream of working in films. He lost one of his eyes in a sawmill accident. Not having any money, he made his way across country to Hollywood by hitching rides illegally on freight trains. After some time of living as a hobo, he finally reached Hollywood in 1930.

Smith eventually was hired on as an animator at the Fleischer Studios in the late 1930s. He worked on several feature films with that studio, including Gulliver's Travels (1939) and various short films including Popeye cartoons and Betty Boop. In the 40s he was appointed the Animation Supervisor of Walter Lantz Productions, working alongside his brother Paul. He then joined UPA studios, working alongside Robert Cannon, John Hubley and others. His films at UPA included the Oscar-winning Gerald McBoing-Boing (1951).

For three years Smith directed and produced films in Paris, France, for Cineaste Productions, winning many awards. His work in the 1960s included commercials and short films for Playhouse Pictures, plus commercials and cartoons for Jay Ward's Rocky and Bullwinkle series, followed by a long association with director/producer Bill Melendez, animating many of the Peanuts television specials including A Charlie Brown Christmas, It's the Great Pumpkin, Charlie Brown and the feature films A Boy Named Charlie Brown and Snoopy Come Home.
