= Run, Run, Sweet Road Runner =

- Title card
- Directed by: Rudy Larriva
- Story by: Rudy Larriva
- Produced by: David H. DePatie; Friz Freleng; Herbert Klynn (executive producer)
- Edited by: Lee Gunther
- Music by: Bill Lava
- Animation by: Character: Hank Smith; Tom McDonald
- Layouts by: Erni Nordli
- Backgrounds by: Jules Engel; Tony Rizzo
- Color process: Technicolor
- Production companies: DePatie–Freleng Enterprises; Format Productions
- Distributed by: Warner Bros. Pictures; The Vitaphone Corporation
- Release date: August 21, 1965
- Running time: 6 minutes
- Country: United States

Run, Run, Sweet Road Runner is a 1965 Warner Bros. Merrie Melodies cartoon directed by Rudy Larriva. The short was released on August 21, 1965, and stars Wile E. Coyote and the Road Runner.

It was the first of eleven Road Runner cartoons subcontracted to Format Productions, and one of only three along with To Beep or Not to Beep and Rushing Roulette which composer William Lava was able to properly score (the subsequent cartoons had to use a set of stock musical cues due to extremely low budgets).

== Plot ==
The short starts off with Wile E. waiting behind a rock for the Road Runner to zoom by. Wile E. looks at the camera and flutters his eyebrows as Road Runner races by. The coyote starts to chase him to the edge of a cliff. Road Runner produces a sign that says "HOLD IT". There are hopscotch marks right at the end of the cliff, which is covered by a cloud. After Road Runner hopscotches, Wile E. takes his turn. But the cloud drifts away and the edge of the cliff breaks. Wile E. plummets to the canyon bottom. The battered coyote looks up at the rim, which is seen from his point of view. Road Runner is heard making his trademark "beep beep" noise and then zooming off.

1. We then see a shot of Wile E. sharpening the spikes on a metal grate. He covers it up with a sheet and raises it up using a pulley. He then climbs down from the top of a rock, and it cuts to Wile E. hammering signs into the ground. One says "FREE FOOD—200 YARDS", another says "BIRD SEED LIKE MOTHER USED TO SERVE—100 YARDS" and a third says "EAT IN THE SHADE, 20 DEGREES COOLER"–followed by Wile E. pouring bird seed into a little bowl with a sign that says "FREE BIRD SEED" that is under the large sharp spiked grate and disguises it as a shade canopy. He watches from the top of his rock with a pair of binoculars as Road Runner runs to the bowl of bird seed, gobbles it up in three seconds, and runs off before the coyote can cut the grate loose. Wile E. gets a stunned look on his face and climbs down to fill the bowl with more bird seed. Unfortunately, the hot sun creates a glare on the lenses of the binoculars he left on top of the rock and it burns the rope holding up the shade canopy. As the coyote pours more seed into the bowl, he hears creaking, stands up to listen, and slowly looks up in distress just as the canopy falls right on top of him, leaving him covered by the sheet from the spiked metal grate, which then peels off in segments like a banana. Angry, he then inadvertently has a new brainstorm: create a fake female road runner.

2. The next scene, we see a box for an "ACME LIGHTNING ROD". Wile E. sticks the rod in the ground and puts the female road runner's "body" on the middle of the stick. He then sticks blue feathers and a beak to the head and paints eyes on it. Wile E. sticks the female "road runner" on the road and uses a road runner "call". He hides behind a rock and holds an axe while he waits for Road Runner to run by, giving him an opportunity to hack him to bits with the axe. Upon hearing the call, Road Runner runs right to the female "road runner" and plants a kiss on it. Wile E. misses and chops the ground, and the force from the impact results in the head from the female "road runner" flying off and hitting Wile E. on the head.

3. Later, after repairing the road runner decoy, Wile E. plants it in another area beside the road before heading back behind a cliff. He then reemerges wearing Native American tribal clothes and holding a drum. He looks up at the clear sky, then commences a rain dance. Clouds soon start to gather and Wile E. does another rain dance. It quickly begins to rain, to Wile E.'s delight. He does a third dance and this time, a bolt of lightning zaps the female road runner, just as Wile E. runs out of the way. His trap tested and ready, the coyote uses the road runner call and the real Road Runner is seen running towards the decoy female road runner. Wile E. hides behind the cliff as the Road Runner stops when he sees the female "road runner". He tiptoes towards her, Wile E., anxiously waiting for him to get close enough, is delighted when Road Runner leans close to the decoy. Wile E. then frantically beats his drum, then unfurls an umbrella to protect himself from another lightning bolt, which unfortunately misses the Road Runner and his "girlfriend" and hits the coyote's umbrella. Burnt to a crisp except for his eyes, he stands there, still holding his (burnt-out) umbrella.
