= Fifty/Fifty (1992 film) =

1992 film by Charles Martin Smith

- Theatrical release poster
- Directed by: Charles Martin Smith
- Written by: Dennis Shryack; Michael Butler
- Produced by: Maurice Singer; Raymond Wagner
- Starring: Peter Weller; Robert Hays; Charles Martin Smith; Ramona Rahman
- Cinematography: David Connell
- Edited by: James Mitchell
- Music by: Peter Bernstein
- Distributed by: Cannon Group
- Release date: February 26, 1993
- Running time: 101 minutes
- Country: United States
- Languages: English; Malay
- Budget: US$ 6 million

Fifty/Fifty is a 1992 American action adventure comedy film. It stars Peter Weller and Robert Hays as two operatives who form a begrudging alliance to overthrow a Southeast Asian dictator on behalf of the CIA, and find friendship, love and a political conscience along the way. The film is directed by Charles Martin Smith, who also has a supporting role.

== Plot ==
General Bosavi, a maniacal tyrant ruling the island country of Tengara, has run afoul of the CIA, who wishes to replace him with a more palatable opponent named Akhantar. There are just two men around for the job: American mercenaries and bickering former colleagues Jake Wyer and Sam French, who don't have much of an allegiance to either side of the conflict, and are more interested in fattening their pockets. Under duress, both men are reunited and tasked with raising a ramshackle army to overthrow Bosavi. Their initial reluctance is somewhat mollified by the presence of Suleta, Akhantar's beautiful and charismatic niece, in the opposition's ranks.

However, Bosavi learns of the impending insurrection and negotiates with American authorities to salvage his leadership. The CIA turns its back on the freedom fighters, who must now brace themselves for the regime's merciless repression. Together with Martin Sprue, their morally conflicted and ultimately sympathetic agency handler, Wyer and French have to decide whether to abandon the rebels as well, or overcome their venal temperament to become the champions of a cause they never realized they cared about.

== Cast ==
- Peter Weller as Jake Wyer
- Robert Hays as Sam French
- Charles Martin Smith as Martin Sprue
- Ramona Rahman as Suleta
- Lim Kay Tong as Akhantar
- Dom Magwili as General Bosavi
- Azmil Mustapha as Colonel Kota
- Dharma Harun Al-Rashid as Sentul
- Mr. Os as Jamik
- Rohmat Juraimi as Muscular Rebel
- Hussein Abu Hassan as Bus Driver
- Shaharuddin Thamby as Colonel Seng
- M. Rajoli as Subaltern
- Ismail Ramli as Elephant Man
- Ursula Martin as Liz Powell

== Production ==
Sylvester Stallone had previously been in talks to co-star in Fifty/Fifty for Paramount Pictures, first with Eddie Murphy around 1983, and later with Kurt Russell. The pair eventually chose to make Tango and Cash instead. Meanwhile, writer Dennis Shryack collaborated to two Chuck Norris vehicles for producer Raymond Wagner, Code of Silence and Hero and the Terror, the later made at Cannon Films. Shryack also brought with him his earlier script, Fifty/Fifty. Cannon picked it up and went into pre-production with Chuck Norris in the Stallone role. The relaunched project was announced in the press in April 1990. Norris, however, balked at the idea of doing another jungle shoot, as his two previous works in this terrain, Missing in Action III and Delta Force 2, had been tarnished by deadly helicopter crashes. He was replaced by Peter Weller. It was Robert Hays' first action film role.

The film was primarily filmed in the Malaysian state of Penang, which represents the fictional nation of Tengara (pronounced as Tenggara, the Malay word for "southeast"), and its cast boasts a variety of local mainstays. The epilogue was shot in Rome, Italy. Some sources mention Sri Lanka as an additional location. According to Robert Hays, the two actors got along well, and both were attracted to the film's mix of action and levity. Weller enjoyed tackling more humorous material after a string of darker roles, whereas Hays, who had found himself typecast in light comedies, hoped the film would show him in a different light. Principal photography took place from October 22 to December 19, 1990.

== Release ==
=== Pre-release ===
During production in late 1990, it was reported that Fifty/Fifty would be distributed by MGM-Pathé. Around that time, MGM, Pathé and Cannon were all part of Giancarlo Paretti's troubled media empire. In 1991, Cannon began operating as an independent entity again under former head of production Christopher Pearce, who became the majority shareholder. The film made appearances at both spring and fall sessions of the 1991 American Film Market. However, its release was severely compromised by years of mismanagement at Cannon, as the company shelved films and released them at a trickle depending on their day-to-day fortunes. It was originally slated for domestic release on June 12, 1992, but was delayed shortly before that date. In January 1993, Cannon announced that it had finally secured funds to distribute a new slate of five pictures, headlined by Fifty/Fifty and Midnight Ride.

=== Theatrical ===
In the United States, Fifty/Fifty received a limited theatrical release from Cannon on February 26, 1993.

=== Home video ===
The film was released on VHS on May 19, 1993. It peaked at 37 in the Billboard video rental charts. A LaserDisc version followed on June 16. Both were handled by Warner Home Video, which had already released the film in several international markets throughout 1992, including the U.K. where it premiered in early July of that year. Warner Home Video also gave the film a domestic DVD release on December 6, 2005.

== Reception ==
Fifty/Fifty garnered mixed to moderately positive reviews. Marjorie Baumgarten of The Austin Chronicle was particularly scathing in her assessment, finding its attempt to mix buddy movie humor with the realistic ordeal of a struggle against dictatorship to be "about as uncomfortable a fence straddler you're ever likely to see". She gave the film half a star out of five. Rodger Clark of the Manchester Evening News found that the film's story was "straight from the CIA rules of engagement and about as subtle", resulting in a "predictable action movie that did absolutely nothing for [him]." Variety's Lawrence Cohn found the film "mediocre" and an obvious modern variant on Butch Cassidy and the Sundance Kid, but conceded that the stunts and technical values were "adequate".

Kevin Thomas of the Los Angeles Times, traditionally a supporter of action films, deemed the premise "inherently familiar and predictable", but said that it "boasted more wit and intelligence than is usual with such fare". He called Weller and Hays' chemistry "contagious". The Washington Post's Hal Hinson also noted the Butch Cassidy parallels, yet he was more amenable to the film, decreeing it "a not bad grade-B genre picture that's about one major star away from being a not bad grade-A genre picture". He enjoyed Weller's performance, but was more reserved about Hays. Although it is unknown if his remark was coincidental, he said that "Kurt Russell would have been ideal" for his role. In his syndicated column, British critic Peter Dean called the film "a more sophisticated Police Academy with plenty of good-humoured action". Writing for the Associated Press agency, Bob Thomas praised the film's "flip dialogue, convincing combat and eye-filling scenery", and deemed that it "deserve[d] more than it will get" due to Cannon's financial woes limiting its promotional push.

== Soundtrack ==
Fifty/Fifty's score was composed by Peter Bernstein. It was performed by a 65-piece orchestra, also conducted by Bernstein. A selection of the film's cues was released on limited edition CD and digital download by Dragon's Domain Records on November 7, 2022, as part of the album The Peter Bernstein Collection Volume 3.
