= Wile E. Coyote and the Road Runner =

Warner Bros. cartoon characters

- Looney Tunes/Merrie Melodies characters
- The duo as seen in the short To Beep or Not to Beep (1963)
- First appearance: Fast and Furry-ous (September 17, 1949; 77 years ago)
- Created by: Chuck Jones; Michael Maltese
- Voiced by: Wile E. Coyote: Mel Blanc † (1949–1989); Joe Alaskey † (1990–2001); Bob Bergen (1997–1998); Dee Bradley Baker (2003); Maurice LaMarche (2008); James Arnold Taylor (2014); J. P. Karliak (2015–2020); Eric Bauza † (2018–2026); Keith Ferguson (2022–present); The Road Runner: Paul Julian † (archival recordings; 1949–present); Mel Blanc † (1964, 1973–1974, 1978); Jeff Bergman (1990); Joe Alaskey † (2008); Eric Bauza † (2018, 2023, 2026); (see below)

In-universe information
- Species: Wile E. Coyote: Coyote; The Road Runner: Greater roadrunner
- Gender: Male (both)
- Relatives: Wile E. Coyote: Cage E. Coyote (father), Tech E. Coyote (descendant); The Road Runner: Rev Runner (descendant)
- Origin: Mexico–United States Border

Wile E. Coyote and the Road Runner are fictional characters from the Looney Tunes and Merrie Melodies series of animated cartoons, first appearing in 1949 in the theatrical short Fast and Furry-ous. In each subject, the cunning, devious and constantly hungry coyote repeatedly attempts to catch and eat the roadrunner, but is humorously unsuccessful. Instead of animal instinct, the coyote deploys absurdly complex schemes and devices to try to catch his prey. They comically backfire, with the coyote invariably getting injured in slapstick fashion. Many of the items for these contrivances are mail-ordered, primarily from the Acme Corporation, but occasionally from other companies.

The characters were created for Warner Bros. Cartoons in 1948 by Chuck Jones and writer Michael Maltese, with Maltese also setting the template for their adventures. The characters star in a long-running series of theatrical cartoon shorts (the first 16 of which were written by Maltese) and occasional made-for-television cartoons. Originally meant to parody chase-cartoon characters such as Tom and Jerry, they became popular in their own right. By 2014, 49 cartoons had been made featuring the characters (including four CGI shorts), the majority by Jones. A feature film revolving around Wile E. Coyote, Coyote vs. Acme, was released in 2026. TV Guide included Wile E. Coyote in its 2013 list of "The 60 Nastiest Villains of All Time".

== History ==
=== Conception ===
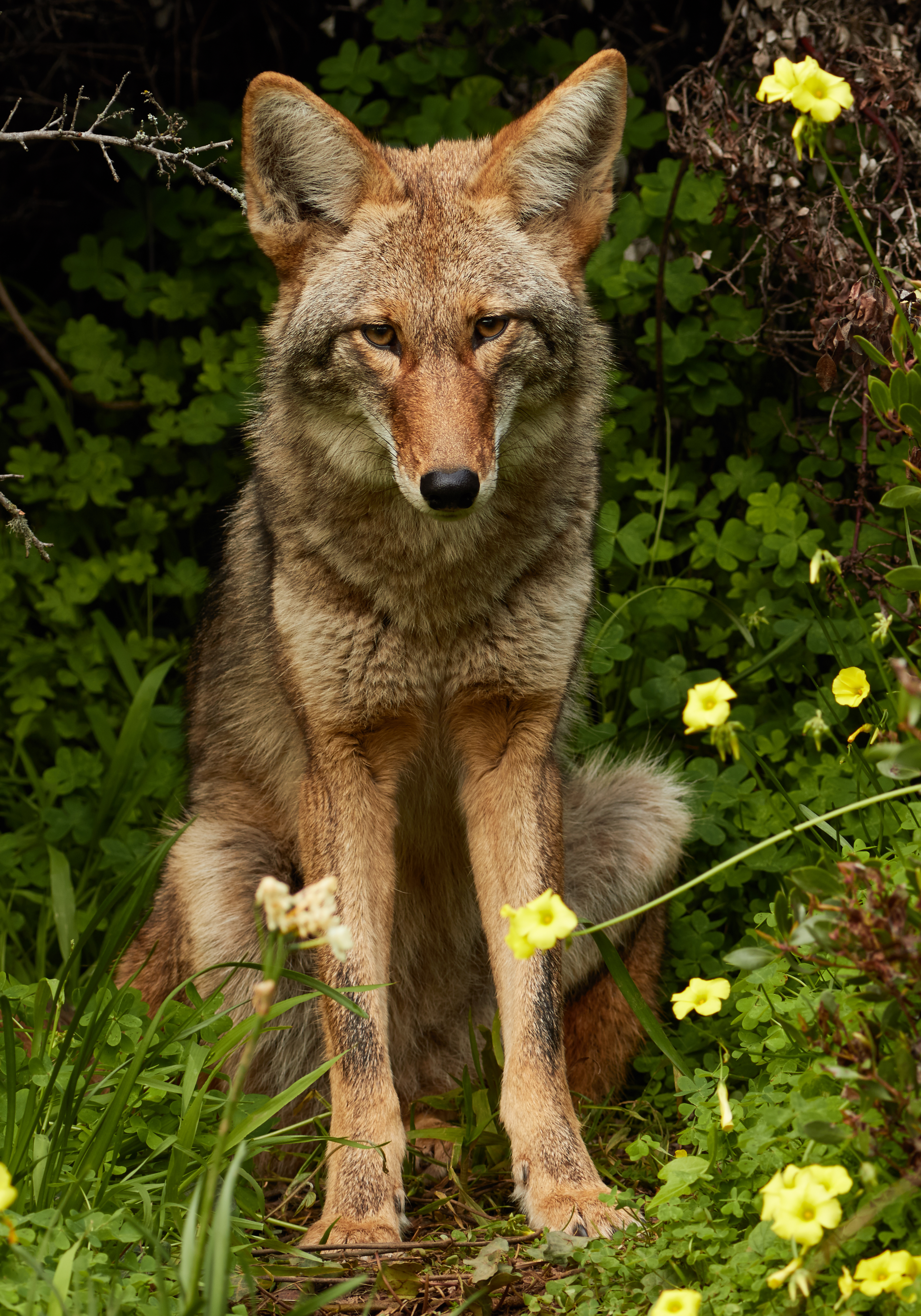
A real coyote (Canis latrans)

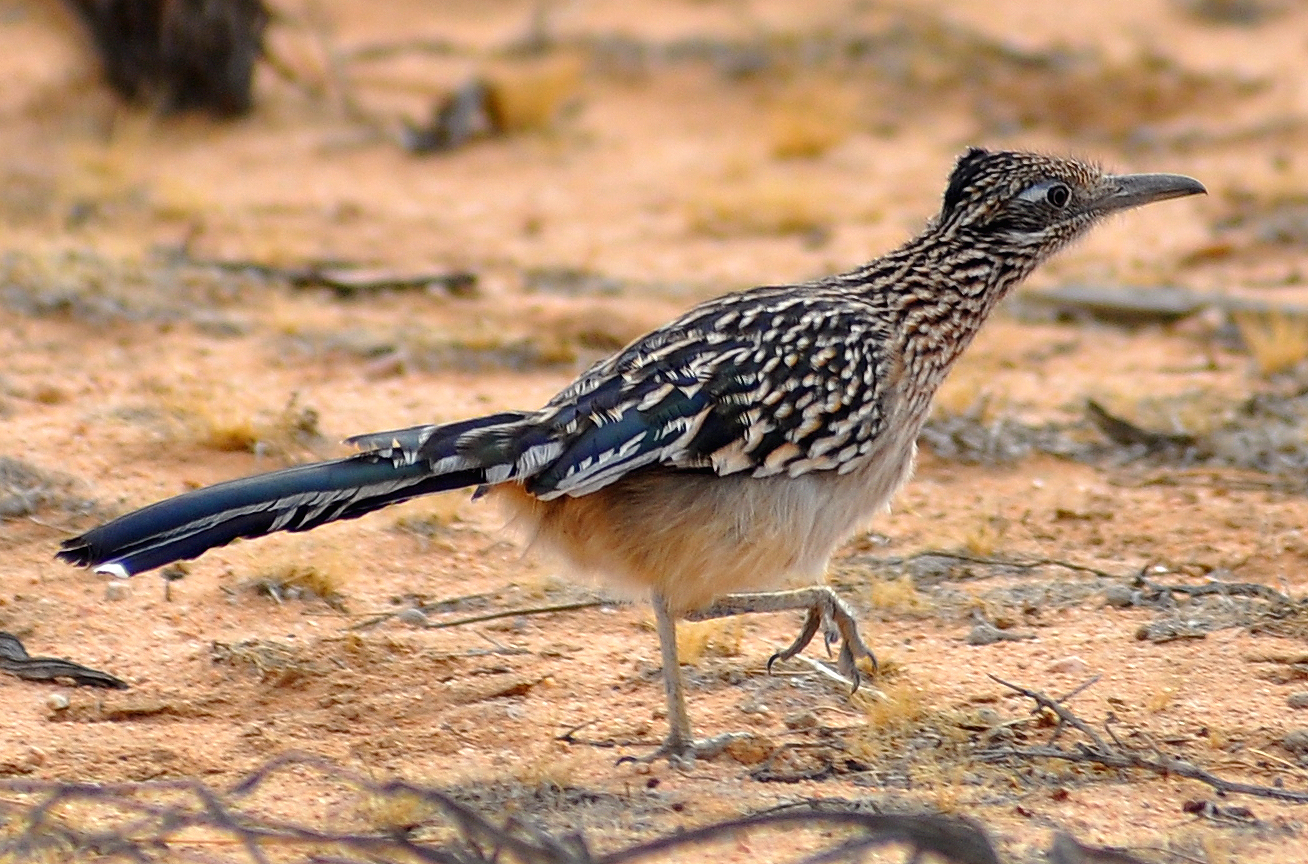
A real greater roadrunner (Geococcyx californianus)

Jones said that he created the Wile E. Coyote-Road Runner cartoons as a parody of traditional "cat and mouse" cartoons such as MGM's Tom and Jerry. He also cites Frank Tashlin's 1941 adaptation of The Fox and the Grapes as inspiration due to its use of blackout gags. Jones was influenced by the "cayote" in Mark Twain's book Roughing It (described by Twain as "a long, slim, sick and sorry-looking skeleton" that is "a living, breathing allegory of Want" and is "always hungry") and his frequent injuries from using tools, and modelled the character's appearance on fellow animator Ken Harris. The coyote was originally named "Don Coyote" (a pun on Don Quixote) in early model sheets.

The Road Runner's "beep, beep" sound was inspired by background artist Paul Julian's imitation of a car horn. Julian voiced the various recordings of the phrase used throughout the Road Runner cartoons, although he was not credited for his work on screen. According to animation historian Michael Barrier, Julian's preferred spelling of the sound effect was either "hmeep hmeep" or "mweep, mweep."

In the main series, Wile E. does not speak, instead portrayed as a mute character who communicates with the use of signs. However he does speak in a few cartoons; when he does, he has a notably upper-class American accent, and often refers to himself as a genius or super-genius. The 1965 short Zip Zip Hooray! is his first speaking appearance, in which he explains his desire to eat the Road Runner, and in another 1965 short, Road Runner a Go-Go, he explains how he sets up his cameras in the desert.

With their formulaic humor, sparse backgrounds and no dialogue, Road Runner shorts could be produced in three weeks or less. When Jones wanted to make a more ambitious cartoon he would sometimes schedule a Road Runner film alongside it to save time and money.

=== Scenery ===
Wile E. Coyote and the Road Runner in Zoom and Bored, 1957

The desert scenery in the first three Road Runner cartoons, Fast and Furry-ous (1949), Beep, Beep (1952), and Going! Going! Gosh! (also 1952), was designed by Robert Gribbroek and was quite realistic. In most later cartoons the scenery was designed by Maurice Noble and was far more abstract, especially after 1955. It is based on the deserts of the Southwestern United States.

=== Laws and rules ===
In his book Chuck Amuck: The Life and Times of an Animated Cartoonist, Chuck Jones wrote that he and the artists behind the Road Runner and Wile E. Coyote cartoons adhered to some simple but strict rules:

1. "The Road Runner cannot harm the Coyote except by going 'Beep-Beep!'"
2. "No outside force can harm the Coyote — only his own ineptitude or the failure of the Acme products."
3. "The Coyote could stop anytime — if he were not a fanatic. (Repeat: 'A fanatic is one who redoubles his effort when he has forgotten his aim.' — George Santayana)."
4. "No dialogue ever, except 'Beep-Beep!'"
5. "The Road Runner must stay on the road — otherwise, logically, he would not be called a Road Runner."
6. "All action must be confined to the natural environment of the two characters — the southwest American desert."
7. "All materials, tools, weapons, or mechanical conveniences, must be obtained from the Acme Corporation."
8. "Whenever possible, make gravity the Coyote's greatest enemy."
9. "The Coyote is always more humiliated than harmed by his failures."

These rules were not always followed, and in an interview years after the series was made, Michael Maltese, principal writer of the original 16 cartoons, stated he had never heard of these or any "rules" and dismissed them as "post-production observation".

=== Running gags ===
Wile E. Coyote anticipates an imminent rockfall by raising a small parasol, in There They Go-Go-Go!

In many of the shorts, a cartoon typically starts with Wile E. Coyote chasing the Road Runner in a desperate attempt to catch him, only for the Road Runner to zip away at breakneck speed, much to the coyote's surprise and utter amazement. Also, most pre-1965 shorts assign each character fake Dog Latin names such as "Carnivorous Vulgaris" for the coyote and "Acceleratti Incredibilus" for the Road Runner, as do a few shorts from 1979 to 2000.

One notable running gag involves the coyote falling from high cliffs; after momentarily being suspended in midair, as if the fall is delayed until he realizes that there is nothing below him. The rest of the scene, shot from a bird's-eye view, shows him falling into a canyon so deep that his figure is eventually lost to sight, with only a small puff of dust indicating his impact. In Chuck Jones' cartoons the coyote usually tumbles or falls face up. Either way, he is more fully animated than in his D-FE-era falls, which always show him falling face down and stiff. The Format Productions cartoons cheapen the falls even more by showing the coyote already most of the way down when the overhead shot begins.

==== Acme Corporation ====
Wile E. Coyote often obtains various complex and ludicrous devices from a mail-order company, the fictitious Acme Corporation, which he hopes will help him catch the Road Runner. The devices invariably fail in improbable and spectacular fashion.

In August, September and October 1982, the National Lampoon published a three-part series chronicling the lawsuit Wile E. filed against the Acme Corporation over the faulty items they sold him in his pursuit of the Road Runner. Even though the Road Runner appeared as a witness for the plaintiff, the coyote still lost the suit. An attempt by Wile E. to sue Acme was also depicted in the 1990 The New Yorker short story "Coyote v. Acme" by Ian Frazier. "Coyote v. Acme" was later adapted into the 2026 film Coyote vs. Acme, where in the course of the trial Wile E. learns that Acme's products are intentionally designed to malfunction as part of Acme exploiting cartoons to improve their products for humans.

== Later cartoons ==
The original Chuck Jones productions ended in 1963 after Jack L. Warner closed Warner Bros. Cartoons. War and Pieces, the last short featuring Wile E. Coyote and the Road Runner, directed by Jones, was released on June 6, 1964. By that time, David H. DePatie and director Friz Freleng had formed DePatie–Freleng Enterprises, moved into the facility just emptied by Warner, and signed a license with Warner Bros. to produce cartoons for the big studio to distribute.

The first DePatie–Freleng cartoon to feature the Road Runner was The Wild Chase, directed by Freleng in 1965. The premise was a race between the bird and "the fastest mouse in all México", Speedy Gonzales, with the coyote and Sylvester the Cat each trying to make a meal out of their respective usual targets. Much of the material was animation rotoscoped from earlier Road Runner and Speedy Gonzales shorts, with the other characters added in. Additionally, the studio produced two cartoons (Zip Zip Hooray! (1965) and Road Runner a Go-Go (1965)) that reuse footage from Chuck Jones' 1962 television pilot Adventures of the Road Runner, with the original audio kept intact. DePatie–Freleng went on to produce 13 more Road Runner cartoons. Two of these shorts were produced in-house and were directed by Robert McKimson (Rushing Roulette (1965) and Sugar and Spies (1966)), while the remaining eleven, directed by Rudy Larriva, were outsourced to Format Films.

Format's Road Runner cartoons, nicknamed the "Larriva Eleven", were characterized for their poorer production quality when compared to DePatie–Freleng, with animation often being reused in nearly every cartoon. The music was also of poorer quality, as the soundtrack (composed by Bill Lava) was relegated to the use of pre-composed music cues rather than a proper score, the only exception to this being Run, Run, Sweet Road Runner (1965) as it was produced with a proper soundtrack. In addition, except for the planet Earth scene at the end of Highway Runnery (1965), there was only one clip of the Coyote's fall to the ground, used over and over again. Jones' previously described "laws" for the characters were not followed with any significant fidelity, nor were Latin phrases used when introducing the characters. These 11 shorts have been considered inferior to the other Golden Age shorts, garnering mixed to poor reviews from critics. Leonard Maltin, in his book Of Mice and Magic, calls the shorts "witless in every sense of the word".

All these Road Runner cartoons can be easily distinguished from Chuck Jones' Road Runner cartoons because they utilize the "Abstract" WB logo opening and closing sequences, which was, ironically, the original idea of Jones himself.

Filmation signed a contract to produce an additional series of shorts in 1971, but Warner Bros. cancelled the contract following their disappointment with the Filmation-produced crossover film Daffy Duck and Porky Pig Meet the Groovie Goolies, in which Wile E. (but not the Road Runner) had appeared.

=== Post-theatrical appearances ===
The Road Runner and the Coyote appeared on Saturday mornings as the stars of their own TV series, The Road Runner Show, from September 1966 to September 1968, on CBS. At this time it was merged with The Bugs Bunny Show to become The Bugs Bunny and Road Runner Show, running from 1968 to 1985.

In the 1970s, Chuck Jones directed some Wile E. Coyote/Road Runner short films for the educational children's TV series The Electric Company. These short cartoons used the coyote and the Road Runner to display words for children to read.

In 1979, Freeze Frame, in which Jones moved the chase from the desert to snow-covered mountains, was seen as part of Bugs Bunny's Looney Christmas Tales.

At the end of Bugs Bunny's Portrait of the Artist as a Young Bunny (the initial sequence of Chuck Jones' TV special Bugs Bunny's Bustin' Out All Over), Bugs mentions to the audience that he and Elmer Fudd may have been the first pair of characters to have chase scenes in these cartoons, but then a pint-sized baby Wile E. Coyote (wearing a diaper and holding a small knife and fork) runs right in front of Bugs, chasing a gold-colored, mostly unhatched (except for the tail, which is sticking out) Road Runner egg, which is running rapidly while some high-pitched "Beep, beep" noises are heard. Earlier in that story, while kid Elmer was falling from a cliff, Wile E. Coyote's adult self tells him to move over and leave falling to people who know how to do it and then he falls, followed by Elmer. This short was followed by the full-fledged Road Runner/Wile E. Coyote short Soup or Sonic.

In the 1980s, ABC began showing many Warner Bros. shorts, but in highly edited form. Many scenes integral to the stories were taken out, including scenes in which Wile E. Coyote landed at the bottom of the canyon after falling from a cliff, or had a boulder or anvil actually make contact with him. The unedited versions of these shorts were not seen again until Cartoon Network, and later Boomerang, began showing them again in the 1990s and early 2000s. Since the release of the WB library of cartoons on DVD, the cartoons gradually disappeared from television, presumably to increase sales of the DVDs. However, Cartoon Network began to air them again in 2011, coinciding with the premiere of The Looney Tunes Show (2011), and the shorts were afterward moved to Boomerang, where they have remained to this day.

Wile E. Coyote and the Road Runner appeared in several episodes of Tiny Toon Adventures. In this series, Wile E. (voiced in the Jim Reardon episode "Piece of Mind" by Joe Alaskey) was the dean of Acme Looniversity and the mentor of Calamity Coyote. The Road Runner's protégé in this series was Little Beeper. In the episode "Piece of Mind", Wile E. narrates the life story of Calamity while Calamity is falling from the top of a tall skyscraper. In the direct-to-video film Tiny Toon Adventures: How I Spent My Vacation, the Road Runner finally gets a taste of humiliation by getting run over by a mail truck that "brakes for coyotes".

The two were also seen in cameos in Animaniacs. They were together in two Slappy Squirrel cartoons: "Bumbie's Mom" and "Little Old Slappy from Pasadena". In the latter, the Road Runner gets another taste of humiliation when he is out-run by Slappy's car, and holds up a sign saying "I quit" — immediately afterward, Buttons, who was launched into the air during a previous gag, lands squarely on top of him. Wile E. appears without the bird in a The Wizard of Oz parody, dressed in his batsuit from one short, in a twister (tornado) funnel in "Buttons in Ows". Also, in the extended version of the segment "Newsreel of the Stars", an artist (a caricature of Chuck Jones) is seen drawing the Road Runner.

The Road Runner appears in an episode of the 1991 series Taz-Mania, in which Taz grabs him by the leg and gets ready to eat him, until the two gators are ready to capture Taz, so he lets the Road Runner go. In another episode of Taz-Mania, the Road Runner cartoons are parodied, with Taz dressed as the Road Runner and the character Willy Wombat dressed as Wile E. Coyote. Willy tries to catch Taz with Acme Roller Skates but fails, and Taz even says "Beep, beep." Wile E. made a cameo in an episode in which he gets crushed by a boulder at a Boulder Museum.

Wile E. and the Road Runner also make an appearance in the 1996 film Space Jam, where they, along with the rest of the Looney Tunes characters, must win against invading aliens through basketball with the help of Michael Jordan. They also appear in its 2021 sequel Space Jam: A New Legacy.

Wile E. Coyote and the Road Runner returned in toddler form in the 2000 theatrical short Little Go Beep. In the cartoon, Wile E. Coyote's dad Cage E. Coyote (voiced by Stan Freberg) has him go through a rite of passage by catching a roadrunner and advises him to stick to a vow of silence until its done.

Wile E. Coyote and the Road Runner appear in Baby Looney Tunes, but only in songs. However, they both had made a cameo in the episode "Are We There Yet?", where the Road Runner was seen out the window of Floyd's car with Wile E. chasing him.

Wile E. Coyote had a cameo as the true identity of an alien hunter (a parody of Predator in the Predator franchise) in the Duck Dodgers episode "K-9 Quarry", voiced by Dee Bradley Baker. In that episode, he was hunting Martian Commander X-2 and K-9. He was also temporary as a member of Agent Roboto's Legion of Duck Doom from the previous season in another episode.

In Loonatics Unleashed, Wile E. Coyote and the Road Runner's 28th century descendants are Tech E. Coyote (voiced by Kevin Michael Richardson) and Rev Runner (voiced by Rob Paulsen). Tech E. Coyote was the tech expert of the Loonatics (influenced by the past cartoons with many of the machines ordered by Wile E. from Acme), and has magnetic hands and the ability to molecularly regenerate himself (influenced by the many times in which Wile E. painfully failed to capture the Road Runner and then was shown to have miraculously recovered). Tech E. Coyote speaks, but does not have a transatlantic accent as Wile E. Coyote did. Rev Runner is also able to talk, though extremely rapidly, and can fly without the use of jet packs, which are used by other members of the Loonatics. He also has sonic speed, also a take-off of the Road Runner. The pair get on rather well, despite the number of gadgets Tech designs in order to stop Rev from talking, also they have their moments where they do not get along. When friendship is shown it is often only from Rev to Tech, not the other way around, this could, however, be attributed to the fact that Tech has only the barest minimum of social skills. They are both portrayed as smart, but Tech is the better inventor and at times Rev is shown doing stupid things. References to their ancestors' past are seen in the episode "Family Business" where the other Road Runners are wary of Tech and Tech relives the famous falling gags done in the Wile E. Coyote/Road Runner shorts.

The Road Runner and Wile E. Coyote feature in 3D computer-animated cartoons or cartoon animation in the Cartoon Network TV series The Looney Tunes Show. The CGI shorts were only included in Season 1, but Wile E. and the Road Runner still appeared throughout the series in 2D animation. – Wile E. Coyote also appears in the TV series Wabbit, voiced by J. P. Karliak, in a similar vein to his previous pairings with Bugs Bunny. He appears as Bugs' annoying know-it-all neighbor who always uses his inventions to compete with Bugs. The Road Runner began making appearances when the series was renamed New Looney Tunes in 2017 where Wile E. Coyote made occasional sound effects in cartoons where he targets the Road Runner.

Wile E. Coyote and the Road Runner both appear in their own cartoon shorts in the HBO Max streaming series Looney Tunes Cartoons.

Wile E. Coyote and the Road Runner make occasional appearances in the preschool educational series Bugs Bunny Builders. Wile E. Coyote (voiced by Keith Ferguson) has a minor supporting role in the series in which he often helps the Looney Builders out with their plans, often using some of his inventions. In the episode "Looney Science", Wile E. has the Looney Builders build him a science museum to show off his inventions, but the Road Runner keeps constantly distracting him.

Wile E. Coyote and the Road Runner appear in the Tiny Toon Adventures reboot, Tiny Toons Looniversity, as well as their protégés from the original series Calamity Coyote and Little Beeper. In this series, Wile E. is the science professor at Acme Looniversity rather than the dean. In the episode "General Hogspital", Wile E. develops a potion that makes Toons lose their Looney DNA to try and finally catch the Road Runner, only for it to backfire and pollute the campus water supply.

=== 3-D shorts ===
The characters appeared in 3-D shorts attached to Warner Bros. features. Three of them were focused on the duo and were screened in theaters: Coyote Falls, Fur of Flying, and Rabid Rider. The rest serve as segments in season 1 of The Looney Tunes Show. A short called Flash in the Pain was shown at the Annecy International Animation Film Festival in 2014.

== Coyote vs. Acme ==
The pair's relationship, as well as Wile E.'s repeated failures to catch the Road Runner due to defective Acme products, is the subject of the 2026 film Coyote vs. Acme. First announced in 2018, the film is based on a 1990 The New Yorker short story "Coyote v. Acme" by author Ian Frazier. The film was notably nearly shelved by Warner Bros. Discovery in 2023 despite having completed production to obtain a tax write-off, but was later saved due to fan outcry and released on August 28, 2026 by distributor Ketchup Entertainment.

The film primarily follows Wile E. Coyote's attempt to sue the Acme Corporation for the various defective products he has used over the years in chasing the Road Runner. He hires Albuquerque, New Mexico lawyer Kevin Avery (Will Forte), who reluctantly agrees to bring the case to trial when Wile E. refuses to simply settle, endangering Avery's firm's meager finances on the expensive trial. The firm tries to recruit the Road Runner to testify, but he ignores and mocks their efforts. While Wile E. and Kevin grow close due to Wile E.'s encouragement of Kevin to believe he can win the trial the same way Wile E. tries to catch the Road Runner, it is soon revealed to the firm that Wile E.'s real goal in the trial is to get the Road Runner to testify so he can capture him on the stand. With the help of Kevin's niece Paige (Lana Condor), they uncover a conspiracy from within the Acme Corporation involving a product development program known as "Project Sisyphus", using defective products on cartoons like Wile E. to improve products for humans. Acme, trying to prevent this knowledge from reaching the public, try to sabotage the trial at various junctures, at one point attempting capture the Road Runner to also get him to testify, but he easily escapes them.

The trial brings enough public attention to prompt the government to call a congressional hearing, which Wile E. only agrees to attend when Kevin promises the Road Runner will be there. The night before the trial, Kevin admits the truth and berates Wile E. for his obsession with the Road Runner, claiming he will never catch him. Wile E., who had genuinely grown to like Kevin in the course of the trial, is devastated and storms out, but is forced to evade another attempt by Acme to silence him. Arriving at the hearing the next day, he overhears Kevin's impassioned speech praising his persistence and the two reconcile. Though Kevin gets Acme CEO Foghorn Leghorn to admit to Project Sisyphus' existence and purpose, Leghorn nearly sways the public to believe that no one really cares what happens to the coyote. However, the Road Runner unexpectedly arrives to testify on Wile E.'s behalf. Initially planning to set off a long-gestating trap for him, Wile E. is instead stunned to hear the Road Runner testify to the harm Acme products have caused him over the years, and that he considers him a friend. Moved to tears, Wile E. chooses to spare the Road Runner, who adds before leaving that he hopes he will come back so they can resume their chase. Ultimately, the case is dismissed by Congress, but Wile E. and his legal team get the chance to get back at Acme by setting off the trap Wile E. intended for the Road Runner, caging and humiliating the Acme team.

Though Wile E. loses the case, he and his team achieve a spiritual victory by inspiring other cartoons to come forward to sue Acme for damages, saving Kevin's firm and allowing word of Project Sisyphus to spread and leading to the arrest of Acme leadership. Wile E. reunites with the Road Runner in the desert and they resume their chase, still adversaries but also affirmed as friends.

== Spin-offs and other media ==
=== Comic books ===
Wile E. Coyote was called Kelsey Coyote in his comic book debut, a Henery Hawk story in Looney Tunes and Merrie Melodies #91 (May 1949). He only made a couple of other appearances at this time and did not have his official name yet, as it was not used until 1952 (in Operation: Rabbit, his second appearance).

The first appearance of the Road Runner in a comic book was in Bugs Bunny Vacation Funnies #8 (August 1958) published by Dell Comics. The feature is titled "Beep Beep the Road Runner" and the story "Desert Dessert". It presents itself as the first meeting between Beep Beep and Wile E. (whose mailbox reads "Wile E. Coyote, Inventor and Genius"), and introduces the Road Runner's wife, Matilda, and their three newly hatched sons (though Matilda soon disappeared from the comics). This story established the convention that the Road Runner family talked in rhyme, a convention that also appeared in early children's book adaptations of the cartoons.

Dell initially published a dedicated "Beep Beep the Road Runner" comic as part of Four Color Comics #918, 1008, and 1046 before launching a separate series for the character numbered #4–14 (1960–1962), with the three try-out issues counted as the first three numbers. After a hiatus, Gold Key Comics took over the character with issues #1–88 (1966–1984). During the 1960s, the artwork was done by Pete Alvarado and Phil DeLara, from 1966 to 1969, the Gold Key issues consisted entirely of Dell reprints. Afterward, reprints combined with new stories began to appear, initially drawn by Alvarado and De Lara before Jack Manning became the main artist for the title. New and reprinted Beep Beep stories also appeared in Golden Comics Digest and Gold Key's revival of Looney Tunes in the 1970s. During this period, Wile E.'s middle name was revealed to be "Ethelbert" in the story "The Greatest of E's" in issue #53 (cover-dated September 1975) of Gold Key Comics' licensed comic book Beep Beep the Road Runner.

The Road Runner and Wile E. Coyote also make appearances in the DC Comics Looney Tunes title. Like the theatrical shorts, Wile E. remained silent in his appearances with the Road Runner in the DC comics.

In 2017, DC Comics featured a Looney Tunes and DC Comics crossovers that reimagined the characters in a darker style. The Road Runner and Wile E. Coyote had a crossover with the intergalactic bounty hunter Lobo in Lobo/Road Runner Special #1. In this version, the Road Runner, Wile E., and other Looney Tunes characters are reimagined as standard animals who were experimented upon with alien DNA at Acme to transform them into their cartoon forms. In the back-up story, done in more traditional cartoon style, Lobo tries to hunt down the Road Runner, but is limited by Bugs to be more kid-friendly in his language and approach.

=== Video games ===
Many Wile E. Coyote and the Road Runner-themed video games have been produced:

- Road Runner (arcade game by Atari Games)
- Electronic Road Runner (self-contained LCD game from Tiger Electronics released in 1990)
- Looney Tunes (Game Boy game by Sunsoft)
- The Bugs Bunny Crazy Castle (NES/Game Boy game by Kemco)
- The Bugs Bunny Crazy Castle 2 (Game Boy game by Kemco)
- The Bugs Bunny Birthday Blowout (NES game by Kemco)
- Road Runner's Death Valley Rally (Super NES game by Sunsoft)
- Wile E. Coyote's Revenge (Super NES game by Sunsoft)
- Desert Speedtrap (Game Gear and Master System game by Sega/Probe Software)
- Bugs Bunny: Crazy Castle 3 (Game Boy game by Kemco)
- Desert Demolition (Mega Drive/Genesis game by Sega/BlueSky Software)
- Sheep, Dog, 'n' Wolf (for the original PlayStation and published by Infogrames, actually based on the Ralph Wolf and Sam Sheepdog cartoons, but the Road Runner does make two cameo appearances)
- Looney Tunes B-Ball (Wile E. is a playable character)
- Space Jam
- Looney Tunes Racing (Wile E. is a playable character. The Road Runner is also seen in the game as a non-playable character.)
- Taz Express (Nintendo 64) game published by Infogrames (Wile E. is an antagonist)
- Taz: Wanted (Wile E. appears)
- Looney Tunes: Back in Action (published by Electronic Arts)
- Looney Tunes Double Pack (published by Majesco, developed by WayForward Technologies, where "Acme Antics" is the Wile E. Coyote and the Road Runner half of the double pack)
- Looney Tunes: Space Race (Wile E. is a playable character)
- Looney Tunes Acme Arsenal (Wile E. has his own level in the PS2 version)
- Looney Tunes: Cartoon Conductor
- Looney Tunes Dash (iOS and Android game)
- Looney Tunes: World of Mayhem (iOS and Android game)
- Looney Tunes: Wacky World of Sports

== Filmography ==
The series consists of:

- 49 shorts, mostly about six to nine minutes long, but including four web cartoons which are "three-minute, three-dimensional cartoons in widescreen (scope)".
- One half-hour special released theatrically (26 minutes).
- Four feature-length films that combine live action and animation.

#	Release date	Title	Duration	Credits		DVD & Blu-Ray Availability
#	Release date	Title	Duration	Story/writing	Direction	DVD & Blu-Ray Availability
1	September 17, 1949	Fast and Furry-ous	6:55	Michael Maltese	Chuck Jones (credited as Charles M. Jones)	DVD: Golden Collection: Vol. 1; Blu-ray/DVD: Platinum Collection: Vol. 1
2	May 24, 1952	Beep, Beep	6:45	Michael Maltese	Charles M. Jones	DVD: Golden Collection: Vol. 2; Blu-ray/DVD: Platinum Collection: Vol. 1
3	August 23, 1952	Going! Going! Gosh!	6:25	Michael Maltese	Charles M. Jones	DVD: Golden Collection: Vol. 2; Blu-ray/DVD: Platinum Collection: Vol. 2
4	September 19, 1953	Zipping Along	6:55	Michael Maltese	Charles M. Jones	DVD: Golden Collection: Vol. 2; Blu-ray/DVD: Platinum Collection: Vol. 2
5	August 14, 1954	Stop! Look! And Hasten!	7:00	Michael Maltese	Charles M. Jones	DVD: Golden Collection: Vol. 2; Blu-ray: Collector's Vault: Vol. 2
6	April 30, 1955	Ready, Set, Zoom!	6:55	Michael Maltese	Charles M. Jones	DVD: Golden Collection: Vol. 2; Blu-ray: Collector's Vault: Vol. 2
7	December 10, 1955	Guided Muscle	6:40	Michael Maltese	Charles M. Jones	DVD: Golden Collection: Vol. 2; Blu-ray/DVD: Platinum Collection: Vol. 3
8	May 5, 1956	Gee Whiz-z-z-z-z-z-z	6:35	Michael Maltese	Charles M. Jones	DVD: Golden Collection: Vol. 2; Blu-ray: Collector's Vault: Vol. 1
9	November 10, 1956	There They Go-Go-Go!	6:35	Michael Maltese	Chuck Jones	DVD: Golden Collection: Vol. 2
10	January 26, 1957	Scrambled Aches	6:50	Michael Maltese	Chuck Jones	DVD: Golden Collection: Vol. 2
11	September 14, 1957	Zoom and Bored	6:15	Michael Maltese	Chuck Jones	DVD: Golden Collection: Vol. 2; Blu-ray: Collector's Vault: Vol. 1
12	April 12, 1958	Whoa, Be-Gone!	6:10	Michael Maltese	Chuck Jones	DVD: Golden Collection: Vol. 2; Blu-ray: Collector's Vault: Vol. 2
13	October 11, 1958	Hook, Line and Stinker	5:55	Michael Maltese	Chuck Jones	DVD: Golden Collection: Vol. 6
14	December 6, 1958	Hip Hip-Hurry!	6:13	Michael Maltese	Chuck Jones	Blu-ray: Collector's Choice: Vol. 1
15	May 9, 1959	Hot-Rod and Reel!	6:25	Michael Maltese	Chuck Jones	Blu-ray: Collector's Choice: Vol. 1
16	October 10, 1959	Wild About Hurry	6:45	Michael Maltese	Chuck Jones	Blu-ray: Collector's Vault: Vol. 1
17	January 9, 1960	Fastest with the Mostest	7:20	Michael Maltese (uncredited)	Chuck Jones	Blu-ray: Collector's Vault: Vol. 2
18	October 8, 1960	Hopalong Casualty	6:05	Chuck Jones	Chuck Jones	Blu-ray: Collector's Choice: Vol. 4
19	January 21, 1961	Zip 'N Snort	5:50	Chuck Jones	Chuck Jones	Blu-ray: Collector's Vault: Vol. 1
20	June 3, 1961	Lickety-Splat	6:20	Chuck Jones	Chuck Jones; Abe Levitow	Blu-ray: Collector's Choice: Vol. 2
21	November 11, 1961	Beep Prepared	6:00	John Dunn; Chuck Jones	Chuck Jones; Maurice Noble	Blu-ray/DVD: Platinum Collection: Vol. 3
Special	May 5, 1962 (earliest known date)	Adventures of the Road Runner	26:00	John Dunn; Chuck Jones; Michael Maltese	Chuck Jones; Maurice Noble; Tom Ray	DVD: Golden Collection: Vol. 2 (extra, unrestored)
22	June 30, 1962	Zoom at the Top	6:30	Chuck Jones	Chuck Jones; Maurice Noble	Blu-ray: Collector's Vault: Vol. 2
23	December 28, 1963	To Beep or Not to Beep^{1}	6:35	John Dunn; Chuck Jones	Chuck Jones; Maurice Noble	DVD: Golden Collection: Vol. 2 (Part of Adventures of the Road Runner, unrestored); DVD: Golden Collection: Vol. 3 (restored); Blu-ray: Collector's Vault: Vol. 2 (restored)
24	June 6, 1964	War and Pieces	6:40	John Dunn	Chuck Jones; Maurice Noble	Blu-ray: Collector's Choice: Vol. 3
25	January 1, 1965	Zip Zip Hooray!^{2}	6:15	John Dunn	Maurice Noble	DVD: Golden Collection: Vol. 2 (Part of Adventures of the Road Runner, unrestored)
26	February 1, 1965	Road Runner a Go-Go^{2}	6:05	John Dunn; Chuck Jones (uncredited); Michael Maltese (uncredited)	Chuck Jones (uncredited); Maurice Noble; Tom Ray (uncredited)	DVD: Golden Collection: Vol. 2 (Part of Adventures of the Road Runner, unrestored)
27	February 27, 1965	The Wild Chase	6:30	Friz Freleng; Cal Howard (both uncredited)	Friz Freleng; Hawley Pratt	DVD: Golden Collection: Vol. 4
28	July 31, 1965	Rushing Roulette	6:20	David Detiege	Robert McKimson	Currently Unavailable
29	August 21, 1965	Run, Run, Sweet Road Runner	6:00	Rudy Larriva	Rudy Larriva	Currently Unavailable
30	September 18, 1965	Tired and Feathered	6:20	Rudy Larriva	Rudy Larriva	Currently Unavailable
31	October 9, 1965	Boulder Wham!	6:30	Len Janson	Rudy Larriva	DVD: Super Stars' Road Runner and Wile E. Coyote
32	October 30, 1965	Just Plane Beep	6:45	Don Jurwich	Rudy Larriva	Currently Unavailable
33	November 13, 1965	Hairied and Hurried	6:45	Nick Bennion	Rudy Larriva	DVD: Super Stars' Road Runner and Wile E. Coyote
34	December 11, 1965	Highway Runnery	6:45	Al Bertino	Rudy Larriva	DVD: Super Stars' Road Runner and Wile E. Coyote
35	December 25, 1965	Chaser on the Rocks	6:45	Tom Dagenais	Rudy Larriva	DVD: Super Stars' Road Runner and Wile E. Coyote
36	January 8, 1966	Shot and Bothered	6:30	Nick Bennion	Rudy Larriva	DVD: Super Stars' Road Runner and Wile E. Coyote
37	January 29, 1966	Out and Out Rout	6:00	Dale Hale	Rudy Larriva	DVD: Super Stars' Road Runner and Wile E. Coyote
38	February 19, 1966	The Solid Tin Coyote	6:15	Don Jurwich	Rudy Larriva	DVD: Super Stars' Road Runner and Wile E. Coyote
39	March 12, 1966	Clippety Clobbered	6:15	Tom Dagenais	Rudy Larriva	DVD: Super Stars' Road Runner and Wile E. Coyote
40	November 5, 1966	Sugar and Spies	6:20	Tom Dagenais	Robert McKimson	DVD: Super Stars' Road Runner and Wile E. Coyote
41	November 27, 1979	Freeze Frame	6:05	John Dunn; Chuck Jones	Chuck Jones	DVD: Golden Collection: Vol. 5 (extra, part of Bugs Bunny's Looney Christmas Tales)
42	May 21, 1980	Soup or Sonic	9:10	Chuck Jones	Chuck Jones; Phil Monroe	DVD: Golden Collection: Vol. 5 (extra, part of Bugs Bunny's Bustin' Out All Over)
43	December 21, 1994	Chariots of Fur^{3}	7:00	Chuck Jones	Chuck Jones	DVD: Super Stars' Road Runner and Wile E. Coyote
44	November 6, 2000	Little Go Beep	7:55	Kathleen Helppie-Shipley; Earl Kress	Spike Brandt	DVD: Super Stars' Road Runner and Wile E. Coyote
45	November 1, 2003	Whizzard of Ow	7:00	Chris Kelly	Bret Haaland	DVD: Super Stars' Road Runner and Wile E. Coyote
46	July 30, 2010	Coyote Falls^{3}	2:59	Tom Sheppard	Matthew O'Callaghan	DVD: Super Stars' Road Runner and Wile E. Coyote
47	September 24, 2010	Fur of Flying^{3}	3:03	Tom Sheppard	Matthew O'Callaghan	DVD: Super Stars' Road Runner and Wile E. Coyote
48	December 17, 2010	Rabid Rider^{3}	3:07	Tom Sheppard	Matthew O'Callaghan	DVD: Super Stars' Road Runner and Wile E. Coyote
49	June 10, 2014	Flash in the Pain	3:13	Tom Sheppard	Matthew O'Callaghan	Currently Unavailable

^{1} Re-edited from Adventures of the Road Runner by Chuck Jones and with new music direction from Bill Lava
^{2} Re-edited from Adventures of the Road Runner by DePatie–Freleng Enterprises
^{3} These cartoons were each shown with a feature-length film. Chariots of Fur was shown with Richie Rich, Coyote Falls was shown with Cats & Dogs: The Revenge of Kitty Galore, Fur of Flying was shown with Legend of the Guardians: The Owls of Ga'Hoole, and Rabid Rider was shown with Yogi Bear. Flash in the Pain was shown at the Annecy International Animated Film Festival on June 10, 2014.

=== Feature films ===
- Space Jam (1996)
- Looney Tunes: Back in Action (2003)
- Space Jam: A New Legacy (2021)
- Coyote vs. Acme (2026)

== Voice actors ==
=== Wile E. Coyote ===
- Mel Blanc (1949–1989)
- Paul Julian (imitating the Road Runner in Zipping Along, Ready, Set, Zoom!, The Road Runner Show bumper and Road Runner's Death Valley Rally)
- Joe Alaskey (Tiny Toon Adventures, Judge Granny)
- Keith Scott (Spectacular Light and Show Illuminanza, The Looney Tunes Radio Show)
- Bob Bergen (Bugs Bunny's Learning Adventures)
- Seth MacFarlane (Family Guy, Seth MacFarlane's Cavalcade of Cartoon Comedy)
- Dee Bradley Baker (Duck Dodgers)
- Maurice LaMarche (Looney Tunes: Cartoon Conductor)
- Jess Harnell (The Drawn Together Movie: The Movie!)
- James Arnold Taylor (Scooby Doo and Looney Tunes: Cartoon Universe)
- JP Karliak (New Looney Tunes)
- Martin Starr (Robot Chicken)
- Eric Bauza (Looney Tunes: World of Mayhem)
- Keith Ferguson (Bugs Bunny Builders)

=== The Road Runner ===
The voice artist Paul Julian originated the character's voice. Before and after his death, his voice was appearing in various media until 1994, other voice actors have replaced him at that time. These voice actors are:

- Mel Blanc (1964 Greeting Card Record, The New Adventures of Bugs Bunny (1973), Four More Adventures of Bugs Bunny (1974), one beep in Bugs Bunny's Magic World, Mel Blanc Voice Watches, Looney Tunes Talking Character Wall Clock)
- Jeff Bergman (Tiny Toon Adventures (in the episode "Animaniacs"))
- Keith Scott (Road Runner Roller Coaster commercial, The Looney Tunes Radio Show)
- Joe Alaskey (Looney Tunes: Cartoon Conductor)
- Seth MacFarlane (The Cleveland Show)
- James Arnold Taylor (The Drawn Together Movie: The Movie!)
- Kevin Shinick (Mad)
- Seth Green (Robot Chicken)
- Unknown (Scooby-Doo and Looney Tunes: Cartoon Universe: Arcade)
- Eric Bauza (Ani-Mayhem, Fast and Furry-ous, Looney Tunes: World of Mayhem, Acme Fools, Coyote vs. Acme)

== In popular culture ==
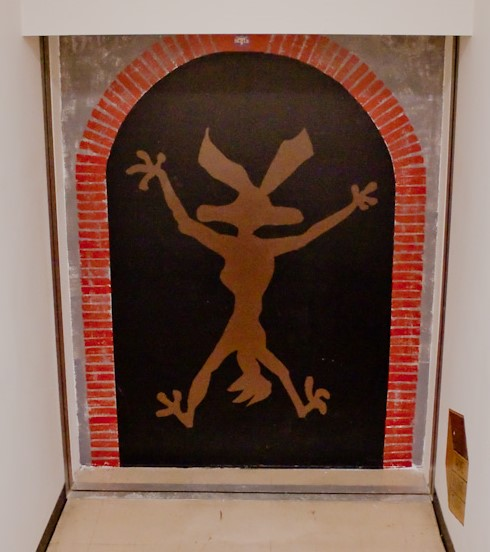
A mural of Wile E. Coyote smashed into the wall of the Rotch Library at MIT. Due to differences in floor height in connected buildings, this hallway unexpectedly ends in a wall.

In 1959, Bo Diddley recorded a song titled "Road Runner" with the female background singers singing "beep-beep". The song was released in 1960.

The pictorial sleeves for Junior Walker & the Allstars' 1966 album Road Runner and the single "(I'm a) Road Runner" depict a running bird similar to the Road Runner character.

A clip from the cartoon Whoa, Be-Gone! was featured in the 1974 Steven Spielberg film The Sugarland Express, during a scene at a drive-in theater.

In the Fraidy Cat episode "Choo-Choo Fraidy", Fraidy Cat meets a coyote named Smile E. Coyote who prefers to not eat Fraidy and instead goes after an overweight jogging roadrunner, clearly parodying the iconic duo.

The 1979 Western comedy film The Villain is a tribute to the cartoons, reconstructing several famous gags in live action.

There are two scenes in Stanley Kubrick's 1980 adaptation of The Shining where Danny Torrance and his mother, Wendy Torrance, are watching The Bugs Bunny and Road Runner Show. The chase between Danny and his father, Jack Torrance, is even reminiscent of the Road Runner cartoons, with the former putting his escape tactics (which he learns from watching the cartoons) to good use, and the chase ending with the latter frozen in ice, in a similar manner to Wile E. Coyote's failed attempts to catch the Road Runner. Both Danny and Wendy also watch the cartoon Rabbit's Feat in Mike Flanagan's 2019 adaptation of Doctor Sleep.

A Wile E. Coyote doll is seen amongst Elliott Taylor's toys in the 1982 film E.T. the Extra-Terrestrial.

The music videos for Twisted Sister's signature songs "We're Not Gonna Take It" and "I Wanna Rock" were based heavily on the cartoon.

The Dutch Euro disco/Italo disco duo Video Kids' song "Sky Rider", from their 1984 album The Invasion of the Spacepeckers, includes samples of the Road Runner's "beep, beep" sound throughout.

In the G.I. Joe: A Real American Hero episode "Lights! Camera! Cobra!", Shipwreck kicks away a coyote before saying, "Beep, beep!"

The 1986 album Bares y Fondas from the Argentine rock group Los Fabulosos Cadillacs included a track called "Tus Tontas Trampas" ("Your Foolish Traps"), which is sung from the Road Runner's perspective on how Wile E. Coyote is going to kill himself in his attempts to catch him.

Wile E. Coyote and the Road Runner appeared in the 1988 Touchstone/Amblin film Who Framed Roger Rabbit. They are first seen silhouetted by the elevator doors in Toontown, and then in full in the Acme Factory during the final scene with other characters.

The Great Divide showed support for Wile E. Coyote with their song of the same name on the 1999 album Revolutions. The band alleged that Road Runner, among other things, was a communist.

Issue #5 of Grant Morrison's run on Animal Man contains a story titled "The Coyote Gospel", in which the character, a thinly veiled parody of Wile E. Coyote named Crafty, decides to leave the "cartoon world" as an attempt to escape the seemingly endless cycle of violence. He is also pursued by a deceased truck driver's vengeful friend, who believes that he is the devil. It was nominated for an Eisner Award for Best Single Issue.

In Weird Al Yankovic's film UHF, a depressed George Newman introduces a Road Runner cartoon on "Uncle Nutsy's Clubhouse" as a "sad and depressing tale of a pathetic coyote in the futile pursuit of a sadistic roadrunner, who mocks him and laughs at him as he's repeatedly crushed and maimed!"

Humorist Ian Frazier created the mock-legal prose piece "Coyote v. Acme", which is included in a book of the same name. It would later provide inspiration for the film Coyote vs. Acme.

Wile E. Coyote appeared in an episode of Night Court (Season 7, Episode 22: Still Another Day in the Life) in which Judge Harold T. Stone (Harry Anderson) found him guilty of harassment and told him to leave the Road Runner alone.

In 1990, Brazilian thrash metal band Chakal recorded the song "Acme Dead End Road" as part of their album, The Man Is His Own Jackal. The song begins with the Road Runner's "beep, beep" sound.

In The Simpsons episode "Homer Alone", Homer Simpson chases Bart Simpson around the house. During the chase, they are each freeze framed and subtitled with their mock Latin names, reading "BART (Brat'us Don'thaveacow'us)" and "HOMER (Homo Neanderthal'us)". In the episode "Bart's Inner Child", Homer is trying to push a trampoline off a cliff, an obvious reference to Wile E. Coyote and the Road Runner. The episode "Realty Bites" featured attempts by Snake to recover his car from Homer; one of these is to set up a wire across a road to decapitate Homer as he drives by. The wire is supplied by "Acme". The episode "The Itchy & Scratchy & Poochie Show" featured the voice actress for Itchy and Scratchy, June Bellamy (a parody of June Foray), who claimed to have done the "Beep!" for the Road Runner, being paid for only one, which the producers then doubled up. Wile E. Coyote appeared during the couch gag in the episode "Smoke on the Daughter" in which he paints a fake couch on the living room wall which the Simpson family run into. Maggie Simpson then zooms in and imitates the Road Runner's "beep, beep" noise. The Road Runner appeared in the episode "Crystal Blue-Haired Persuasion" during a dream sequence in which he is attacked and eaten by the Space Coyote.

In 1992–1998, French-Italian dance project Cartoons used Wile E. Coyote on the covers of their albums. They also released the song "Beep-Beep", which contains samples from the cartoons. The song was produced by Pin-Occhio and written by Giuliano Saglia.

In the 1992 film Under Siege, "Road Runner" is the code name of the renegade former CIA operative William Strannix, played by Tommy Lee Jones, in a reference to the fact that the character is never captured.

Wile E. Coyote has appeared twice in Family Guy: his first episode, "I Never Met the Dead Man", depicts him riding in a car with Peter Griffin. When Peter runs over the Road Runner and asks if he hit "that ostrich", Wile E. tells him to keep going. His second appearance was in "PTV", in which Wile E. attempts to get a refund for a giant-sized slingshot at an Acme retailer where Peter works. The DVD-exclusive episode "Partial Terms of Endearment" features a gag that parodies the Wile E./Road Runner cartoons where Peter attempts to drop a boulder on Lois to terminate her pregnancy; in place of the usual free bird seed, he lures her with free Grey's Anatomy DVDs.

In the 1998 film Armageddon, as the NASA scientists explain how the shuttles will ignite their thrusters at a precise moment to get a gravity assist, the character Rockhound says, "It's where the Coyote sat his ass down in a slingshot... and he strapped himself to an Acme rocket. Is-is that what we're doin' here? No, no, really, because it didn't work out too well for the Coyote, Harry," prompting head of NASA Dan Truman to remark, "We have a lot better rockets than the Coyote," and continues the briefing acknowledging the "Road Runner thrust move".

The Tom Smith song "Operation: Desert Storm", which won a Pegasus award for Best Fool Song in 1999, is about the different ways Wile E. Coyote's plans fail. (Note: Attributed to multiple references:) Guitarist Mark Knopfler recorded a song called "Coyote" in homage to Wile E. and the Road Runner on the 2002 album The Ragpicker's Dream.

In the book Thief of Time by Terry Pratchett, a character performs "the Stance of the Coyote": stopping a fall in mid-air.

In the Doctor Who novel The Crooked World, one of the inhabitants of the planet is the Watchamacallit, a parody of the Road Runner.

In the Bounty Hamster episode "Just Deserts", Marion is seen flipping through an Acme (here referred to as "Acmee") catalogue, and uses its products to get Cassie back, only to fail. Wile E. Coyote (coloured grey here) shows up and comments that after 30 years, he has finally learnt not to buy from the same brand; however, one of the Acmee products, a giant catapult, falls onto him immediately after, followed by a boulder.

In the 2004 film Kung Fu Hustle, the scene in which Sing is chased by the Landlady as he flees from Pigsty Alley is a homage to the cartoons.

In the What's New, Scooby-Doo? episode "New Mexico, Old Monster," Wile E. and the Road Runner make a cameo appearance where they are seen outside the Mystery Machine's window. The Road Runner beeps at Scooby-Doo, and following a failed attempt by Wile E., a confused Scooby turns to the camera and says "Beep, beep?"

In the Teen Titans episode, "Episode 257-494", which featured the heroes trapped in a television world, Beast Boy, having morphed into a perfect Wile E. Coyote look-alike and described "Animalus Switcheroonus", chases Control Freak, or "Couchus Potaticus". In the subsequent sequence, the disguised Beast Boy falls off a cliff just as Wile E. frequently does, complete with a "Help" sign.

Bell X1's song "One Stringed Harp" from their 2009 album Blue Lights on the Runway includes the lyric "Like Wile E. Coyote / As if the fall wasn't enough / Those bastards from Acme / They got more nasty stuff".

The Road Runner appeared in the pilot episode of The Cleveland Show in which Peter Griffin straps a rocket to his back in a similar fashion of Wile E. Coyote and attempts to catch the Road Runner, only to wreck Cleveland Brown's house again, prompting Cleveland to finally decide to leave Quahog.

Wile E. Coyote and the Road Runner appeared in Seth MacFarlane's Cavalcade of Cartoon Comedy in the short "Die, Sweet Roadrunner, Die". In this short, Wile E. crushes the Road Runner with a large boulder and eats him, but then struggles to find purpose in life, having not trained for anything else other than chasing the Road Runner. Ultimately, after a short-lived job as a waiter in a local diner, and a suicide attempt (by way of catapulting himself into a mountain at close range), Wile E. finally realizes what he is to do with his life, and reveals he is now an advocate for Christianity.

During a scene in The Drawn Together Movie: The Movie!, the Drawn Together cast accidentally run over and kill the Road Runner with Foxxy Love's van. Upon noticing this, Wile E. Coyote runs up to the Road Runner's corpse and declares "Without you, my life really has no meaning", before shooting himself with a "Bang!" flag gun.

The French-South Korean television series Oscar's Oasis is heavily inspired by the cartoons, with the action taking place in a desert and containing several chase scenes; the characters also often fall off a cliff in a similar manner to Wile E.

The French slapstick animated series Zig & Sharko is also heavily inspired by the cartoons, with Zig the Hyena constantly trying to catch and eat Marina the Mermaid by using various contraptions similar to Wile E.'s plans, but his plans are always foiled by Sharko. Zig even imitates the Road Runner's "beep, beep" noise in the episode "Run Sharko, Run".

Both Wile E. Coyote and the Road Runner have appeared in Robot Chicken on multiple occasions. One sketch sees Wile E. faking his own suicide and then torching the Road Runner with a flamethrower when he shows up at Wile E.'s "funeral". Another sketch shows Wile E. teaching a college course on how to get away with murder, using the Road Runner's murder as an example, the students trace the mail orders for the Acme products used to commit the murder to Wile E., who is executed by electric chair for the crime. Another sketch sees Wile E. presenting his iconic "fake tunnel" at an art auction, and another reveals why Wile E.'s Acme products always fail -–the Acme Corporation is run by multiple Road Runners.

In the Teen Titans Go! episode "Squash & Stretch", Cyborg teaches the other Titans about the humor in cartoon violence, and shows them a Road Runner cartoon, with the characters replaced with parodies of Gumball Watterson and Darwin from The Amazing World of Gumball. Wile E. Coyote and the Road Runner appear in the episode, "Warner Bros. 100th Anniversary". They are among the Looney Tunes characters as guests for the Warner Bros. centennial celebration. They also made a cameo appearance in the Season 9 premiere episode "Stickiest Situation", in which Sticky Joe is teleported into the cartoon. The scene was animated by Hayk Manukyan.

In the Dino Dana episode "Get That Incisivosaurus!", Dana Jain tries getting the feather of the Incisivosaurus, but her plans keep failing. Her inspirations come from her stepfather Aman Jain's old cartoon show, The Fox and the Hare, a parody of Wile E. Coyote and the Road Runner.

In the Sugar and Toys episode "The Every Damn Internet Challenge Challenge", Wile E. (here named "Grimy Coyote") appears in a parody of Laff-A-Lympics called "L-O-Lympics" as a co-host (replacing Mildew Wolf), along with Snagglepuss (called Strugglepuzz).

A handler-dog team called Road Runners Beep Beep were competitors in the 2023 annual televised UK dog show Crufts.

Wile E. appears in the 197th episode of the web series Death Battle, to face off against Tom Cat himself in a battle of unsuccessful cartoon chasers. This episode was selected to happen by votes from fans, beating out several other popular ideas as well. The episode was initially slated for 2024, but was canceled after Death Battle's company Rooster Teeth was shut down by its parent company Warner Bros. However, show creators Ben Singer, Chad James, Austin Harper and Sam Mitchell managed to secure the Death Battle intellectual property, and started a Kickstarter to continue the show. The episode released on June 22, 2025, and declared Wile E. the winner due to his superior physical stats, arsenal, and "toonliness."

"Coyote time" is a term used in the video game community to describe a situation in some games where a character is able to move and jump slightly further beyond the apparent graphical edge of a cliff or building, named for Wile E. Coyote's tendency to run off the edge of a cliff without initially falling.

== Commercial appearances ==
The Plymouth Road Runner was a performance car produced by the Plymouth division of Chrysler between 1968 and 1980. An official licensee of Warner Bros. (paying $50,000 for the privilege), Plymouth used the image of the cartoon bird on the sides and the car had a special horn (with "Voice of Road Runner" labels) that sounds like the character's signature "beep, beep" sound. Some engine options (notably the 426 Hemi) included Road Runner "Coyote Duster" graphics on the air cleaner. The 1970 Plymouth Superbird version of the Road Runner, arguably one of the most popular cars of the muscle car era, included a graphic of the Road Runner holding a crash helmet on its massive rear spoiler and one of its headlight covers. The commercials were directed by Alex Lovy and Robert McKimson.

From 1985 to 1987, General Motors used the Road Runner on its marketing campaign in 1985 for its Holden Barina in Australia. The campaign's slogan, "Beep Beep Barina", has since been known as a catchphrase by many Australians. In 1987, Wile E. Coyote and the Road Runner also appeared in a Hershey's commercial, directed by Mark Kausler and animated by Darrell Van Citters and Ric Machin.

In 1995, the Road Runner became the mascot for Time Warner's cable internet service, also named Road Runner. Interestingly, one commercial involved Wile E. as the "mascot" of DSL. The Road Runner was also the mascot of Time Warner's car sales website, BeepBeep.com, and appeared in commercials on Time Warner cable systems in several television markets. The Road Runner was retired as Time Warner Cable's mascot in 2011.

In 1996, Wile E. appeared alongside football star Deion Sanders in a Pepsi commercial.

In 1998, Wile E. and the Road Runner appeared in a Pontiac Wide Track commercial. Wile E. chases the Road Runner while driving the car, but the commercial ends before he can catch him.

In 2004, Wile E. and the Road Runner appeared (along with Bugs Bunny and Daffy Duck) in an Aflac commercial, in which the former is shown as being a prime candidate for the company's services. Before he plummets, taking an animated version of the Aflac duck with him, he holds up a sign reading the company's tagline, "Ask About It At Work." The commercial was directed by Frank Molieri at Acme Filmworks and animated by Bill Waldman.

== See also ==
- Zig & Sharko, a French animated slapstick comedy television series produced by Xilam, which was inspired by the Coyote and Roadrunner shorts
- Arizona Coyotes, a former NHL team whose AHL affiliate was the Tucson Roadrunners
- Calamity Coyote
- Coyote (mythology)
- Coyotes in popular culture
- Little Beeper
- Plymouth Road Runner
- Road Runner High Speed Online
