= Blackout Effect =

- Written by: Matthew Bombeck
- Directed by: Jeff Bleckner
- Starring: Eric Stoltz; Charles Martin Smith; Leslie Hope
- Music by: Gary Chang
- Country of origin: United States
- Original language: English

Production
- Producer: Anthony Santa Croce
- Cinematography: Alan Caso
- Editor: Geoffrey Rowland
- Running time: 90 minutes

Original release
- Network: NBC
- Release: January 4, 1998

Blackout Effect (UK: 747) is a 1998 made-for-television disaster/thriller film. Blackout Effect was originally broadcast on NBC on January 4, 1998.

== Plot ==
Eric Stoltz plays John Dantley, an NTSB officer sent to O'Hare Airport in Chicago to investigate a collision between Global Airlines Flight 1025 (a Boeing 757-200 from Los Angeles to Washington D.C.) and PDO Cargo flight 342 (a Boeing 727-200F flying westbound cargo plane), where 185 people are killed.

Charles Martin Smith plays Henry Drake, an air traffic controller who insists his radar system malfunctioned when the planes were being cleared for landing. When the rest of air traffic control dismiss Drake and blame the incident on human error, Dantley must discover the truth about the crash: Was Drake — a high-strung individual who already didn't get along with his co-workers — simply incompetent at his job or did Drake's co-workers and superiors know about and/or had previously been warned about the aging radar system showing signs of seriously malfunctioning and crashing at critical times (and thus liable to lead to deadly situations such as the one that happened), but instead of taking action ignored the warnings and initiated a cover-up?

== Cast ==
Actor/Actress	Role
Eric Stoltz	John Dantley
Charles Martin Smith	Henry Drake
Denis Arndt	Frank Wyatt
Leslie Hope	Karen
Lorraine Toussaint	Kim Garfield
Andy Comeau	Tim Connors
Tucker Smallwood	Harold

== Production notes and details ==
The film is credited in the UK as 747 and is released as such on DVD.
