= David Rose (artist) =

American illustrator and animator

David Rose (March 10, 1910 – March 4, 2006) was an American artist, illustrator, and art director.

== Early life ==
Rose grew up in Boston as the son of first-generation Russian Jewish parents; he studied art in 1930s Haifa in the British Mandate of Palestine and the School of Music and Fine Arts in Boston. He graduated from the Massachusetts College of Art in 1934.

== Career ==
Rose worked as "an animator, a layout artist, a publicity artist, an art director, an illustrator and a designer" at Walt Disney Animation Studios, Warner Bros. Cartoons, and Universal Pictures.

During World War II, he worked for the Armed Forces Motion Picture Unit with Frank Capra and Ted Geisel (pen name Dr. Seuss). He traveled and made films before and after the war. He documented Jewish refugees and immigrants who were refused entry into Switzerland in 1938. He filmed sites important in the Spanish Inquisition, and kibbutzim workers in the British Mandate and later Israel.

His pieces later centered around the dignity of work, and included rock miners, swamp workers, agricultural workers, sailors, longshoremen, and subway construction workers, and in the 21st century, mothers affected by the Israeli-Palestinian conflict.

From 1973 to 1996, he was a courtroom artist who covered national and international trials. He worked as an art director for MGM and NBC and was the first art director at Los Angeles’s KCET (public television). He documented Nazi general Klaus Barbie for the Magnes Museum. He worked as a graphic artist for advertising agencies in Hollywood and was honored by the Mayor of Los Angeles for his work. He was honored as well by the Art Directors Guild.

For his work covering the Pentagon Papers, he was nominated for an Emmy Award. He was the only artist-journalist who covered that story, particularly Daniel Ellsberg's prosecution, which was his first courtroom work. Trials he covered included Patty Hearst, Rodney King, John DeLorean, 1980 Bob's Big Boy murder accomplice Ricky Sanders, Angelo Buono Jr., Richard Ramirez, Timothy McVeigh, Huey P. Newton, Roman Polanski, Lynette Fromme, and Yigal Amir (Rose's last courtroom work), for networks including CNN and its affiliates. He was based in Los Angeles. Most of his work resides in the Smithsonian, Library of Congress, USC and UCLA Special Collections.

== Personal life ==
Rose married art teacher Ida Shapiro in 1945, and fathered two children with her, Marsha and Lisa. He died aged 95 in 2006 at his home due to complications from pneumonia. He is survived by his daughter and artist Lisa.
