= Sugar and Spies =

1966 film by Robert McKimson

- Directed by: Robert McKimson
- Story by: Tom Dagenais
- Produced by: David H. DePatie; Friz Freleng
- Edited by: Lee Gunther
- Music by: Walter Greene
- Animation by: Bob Matz; Manny Perez; Warren Batchelder; Dale Case; Ted Bonnicksen
- Layouts by: Dick Ung
- Backgrounds by: Tom O'Loughlin
- Production company: DePatie–Freleng Enterprises
- Distributed by: Warner Bros. Pictures; Vitagraph Company of America
- Release date: November 5, 1966 (US premiere)
- Running time: 6 minutes
- Country: United States

Sugar and Spies is a 1966 Warner Bros. Looney Tunes cartoon. The short was released on November 5, 1966, and stars Wile E. Coyote and the Road Runner. It is the second of two Road Runner shorts directed by Robert McKimson and the only one to feature music by Walter Greene. It is also the final appearances of Road Runner and Wile E. Coyote during the Golden age of American animation.

The title of the cartoon is a play on the term "sugar and spice".

== Summary ==
During one of his many chases with the Road Runner, Wile E. Coyote is hit with a briefcase, thrown from an enemy agent's car that is evading the police. The briefcase is actually a spy kit containing several gadgets, along with a black coat and spy hat that Wile E. wears throughout the cartoon. The gadgets Wile E. attempts to use on the Road Runner (which all result in failure as usual), include:

1. Sleeping gas: Road Runner dodges the gas and blows it back at Wile E., who sleepwalks off a cliff.
2. Do-it-yourself time bomb that Wile E. mails to the Road Runner (by General Delivery), but is returned to the Coyote by Road Runner (disguised as a mailman) for insufficient postage. As Wile E. takes the package back into his cave for an extra stamp... BOOM!!!
3. Explosive putty which is applied under a huge boulder with a mound of bird seed placed nearby. Wile E. hides behind another boulder further away and lights the fuse, only to be crushed by the launched boulder.
4. Model T jalopy Spy car equipped with machine guns, ejection seat and cannon: The bullets from the machine guns ricochet off a boulder and blow away the car top, the Coyote ejects himself from the car while suspended upside down and the force from the cannon sends the car backwards, running over the Coyote who then fails to dodge the cannonball.
5. Remote control flying bombs: Wile E. tests the first bomb on a cactus, then sets the remote control for the next bomb to follow Road Runner, who hides under the Coyote's stool and escapes in time for Wile E. to take the explosion. When the smoke clears, the dazed Coyote has the bomb's wings attached to his arms, prompting the Road Runner to set the remote control for the Moon. As Wile E. is sent flying away, the Road Runner triumphantly beeps and runs off the screen, leaving a trail of smoke that spells out the words "The End".
