= William Lava =

American composer (1911–1971)

William "Bill" Lava
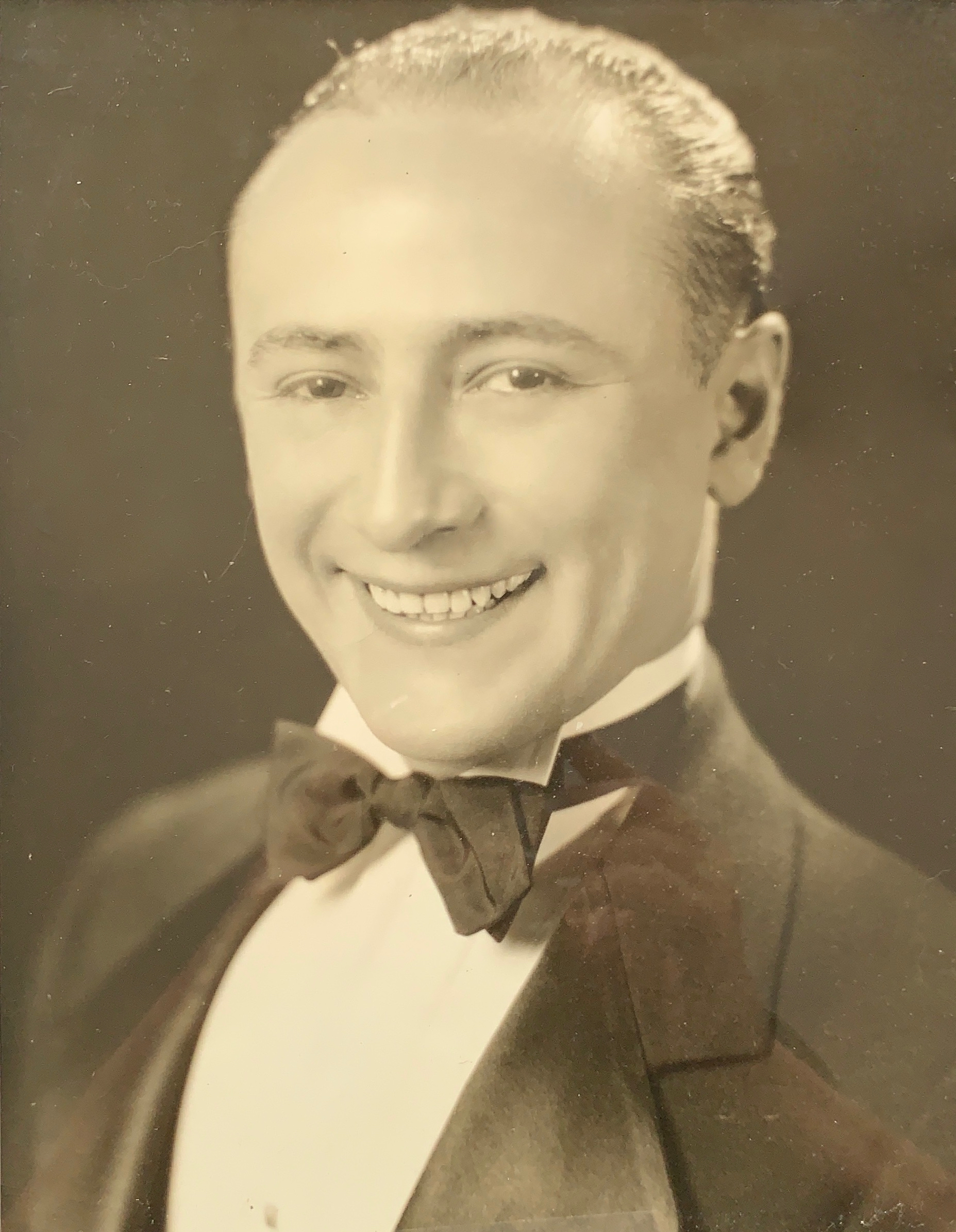

Background information
- Born: William Benjamin Lava; March 18, 1911; St. Paul, Minnesota, U.S.
- Died: February 20, 1971 (aged 59) Los Angeles, California, U.S.
- Genre: Film score
- Occupation: Composer
- Years active: 1936–1971

William "Bill" Benjamin Lava (March 18, 1911 – February 20, 1971) was a composer and arranger who composed and conducted music for feature films as well as Warner Bros.' Looney Tunes and Merrie Melodies animated cartoons from 1962 to 1969, replacing the deceased Milt Franklyn, making him the last composer and arranger in the classic era of Warner Bros. Cartoons.

Lava's music was markedly different from that of Franklyn and previous composer Carl Stalling, with a tendency towards atonality. A sense of tension is often created in Lava's scores using sequences based on the notes of the diminished seventh chord.

Lava also composed and sang the theme to the TV western series Cheyenne and composed music for one episode of the series Gunsmoke ("Little Girl," April 1, 1961).

At different times, Lava was credited as "William Lava" or "Bill Lava".

== Education ==
Lava was educated at Von Humboldt Grammar School and Lane Tech High School in Chicago, then attended Northwestern University where he majored in journalism. He studied conducting with Albert Coates in Los Angeles. Lava also wrote short stories for various magazines and was the editor of Northwestern Commerce Magazine and associate editor of Purple Parrot.

== Career ==
Arriving in Hollywood in 1936, Lava made arrangements for musical radio programs, then scored a number of serials, such as Zorro's Fighting Legion, and motion pictures, such as The Painted Stallion; Orphans of the Street, A Boy and His Dog;My Wife's Relatives, Embraceable You; Dangerously They Live; The Hidden Hand; I Won't Play; Star in the Night and Hitler Lives. He was also responsible for scores for the Warner Bros. Pictures' Joe McDoakes short subjects and Republic serials. Among his compositions during this era were The Moonrise Song (It Just Dawned On Me).

During World War II Lava composed music for various United States Department of War documentary films.

Walt Disney Productions hired Lava in the mid-1950s, where he wrote or co-wrote the incidental music for the TV series Zorro and the "Spin and Marty" and "Hardy Boys" segments of The Mickey Mouse Club. While he was later best known for cartoon music, Lava did not score any cartoons at Disney, though he is credited with the score for 1955's TV segment "The Story of the Silly Symphony". In 1953, Lava provided the music score for the Ed Wood film Glen or Glenda, although he would not receive onscreen credit.

=== Warner Bros. ===
On his arrival at the Warner Bros.' cartoon studio, Lava's first assignment was the Tweety and Sylvester cartoon The Jet Cage. Franklyn had scored the first two minutes of the cartoon when he died suddenly of a heart attack; though Lava completed the cartoon, Franklyn was credited with the entire score. Franklyn used strings and flutes in his portion, arranged similarly to his earlier cartoons, while Lava's score sounds more mechanical and less orchestrated, with a xylophone at one point. Lava's first credited cartoon is the Daffy Duck short Good Noose, also released in 1962. Although Lava's previous work also sounded mechanical, it was greatly enhanced by the studio orchestra. However, at the time of his arrival, Warner Bros. reduced, and later dismantled, the full-time studio orchestra. Without the music budget that he was accustomed to, Lava was forced to work with a much smaller orchestra to record his scores.

Lava was responsible for many scores, including those heard in eleven Road Runner/Wile E. Coyote cartoons, released from 1965–1966 subcontracted by DePatie–Freleng Enterprises to Format Films. The budgets for these cartoons, all directed by Rudy Larriva and known as the "Larriva Eleven", were even tighter still, so much so that only the first short, Run, Run, Sweet Road Runner had real scored music. The other ten (from Tired and Feathered to Clippety Clobbered) used a set of generic musical cues, which did not follow the action closely as scores did in other Warner Bros. productions. However, he did manage to produce proper scores for two out of the three Road Runner/Wile E. shorts produced fully by DePatie–Freleng, The Wild Chase (also featuring Speedy Gonzales and Sylvester) and Rushing Roulette.

=== Other cartoons, films and TV ===
Lava also composed music for 19 of the 124 Pink Panther cartoons (USA, 1964, animation), always based on Henry Mancini's original theme, adapting it to closely follow character action. The nineteenth short, Pink, Plunk, Plink was composed instead by Walter Greene, however, Lava scored the following short, Smile Pretty, Say Pink, which was his final new composition for the series. Greene scored the following six shorts, with the music cues from each being recycled for all future cartoons up until Therapeutic Pink (with the exception of Extinct Pink, composed by Doug Goodwin, who was known for his music for other DePatie–Freleng shorts series such as The Ant and the Aardvark and Roland and Rattfink); both Greene and Lava's music cues would be recycled for future cartoons beginning with Congratulations It's Pink. Following this, the remaining shorts would be aired on television as part of The All New Pink Panther Show (although they would be rereleased theatrically), where all shorts utilized music cues composed by Steve DePatie (son of series co-producer David H. DePatie).

Lava also wrote music for the film PT-109, provided music for Frank Capra's 1943 documentary The Battle of Britain, and composed music for the 1945 documentary short Hitler Lives, directed by Don Siegel.

Lava co-wrote with Irving Taylor the theme and most of the incidental music for the TV series F Troop. He also composed the silent-film music for the "bookend" sequences at the beginning and end of the 1961 Twilight Zone episode "Once Upon a Time" - performed by pianist Ray Turner.

Lava was also employed as Music Supervisor with David Rose for a couple of seasons of Bonanza.

Lava's feature film work was prolific. He composed the scores over 50 films, including Wall of Noise (1963), Chamber of Horrors (1966), Chubasco (1968), In Enemy Country (1968), Assignment to Kill (1968), The Good Guys and the Bad Guys (1969) and Dracula vs. Frankenstein (1971).

== Personal life ==
Lava was the son of Abraham Lava (1882–1958) and Rose Chernavsky (1886–1938). He married Lenore Goldman on December 31, 1932 in Chicago, Illinois. They had two daughters, Charmaine (1938–2012) and Rochelle Lava (1939–1997).

A staunch anti-communist, Lava became known as an outspoken critic of the Cuban Revolution. He spoke in favor of direct military action against the Castro regime, continuing to protest in this manner from 1959 until his death.
