= Hank Smith (animator) =

American animator

Henry Otto "Hank" Smith
- Born: January 23, 1921; Gladstone, Michigan U.S.
- Died: November 21, 1984 (aged 63); Woodland Hills, Los Angeles, California U.S.
- Occupations: Cartoon animator, film director
- Relatives: Paul Smith (brother); Frank Smith (brother); Charles Martin Smith (nephew)

Henry Otto "Hank" Smith was an animator who worked for many Hollywood animation studios during the 1950s, 1960s, 1970s, and 1980s. His work included numerous cartoons for television, including many featuring Mr. Magoo, The Road Runner, Fat Albert, and many of the Peanuts television specials with Bill Melendez. He was the brother of Frank Smith and Paul Smith and uncle of actor Charles Martin Smith.

== Career ==
=== Filmography ===
- Inside Magoo (1960)
- Mister Magoo (14 episodes, 1960)
- Popeye the Sailor (5 episodes, 1960)
- The Dick Tracy Show (9 episodes, 1961)
- The Alvin Show (1961)
- Gay Purr-ee (1962)
- Mister Magoo's Christmas Carol (1962)
- The Famous Adventures of Mr. Magoo (4 episodes, 1964)
- Run, Run, Sweet Road Runner (1965)
- Tired and Feathered (1965)
- Boulder Wham! (1965)
- Just Plane Beep (1965)
- Hairied and Hurried (1965)
- Chaser on the Rocks (1965)
- Shot and Bothered (1966)
- Out and Out Rout (1966)
- The Solid Tin Coyote (1966)
- Clippety Clobbered (1966)
- The Lone Ranger (1966)
- Birdman (1967)
- The Night Before Christmas (1968)
- The Banana Splits Adventure Hour (1968)
- It Was a Short Summer, Charlie Brown (graphic blandishment, 1969)
- Frosty the Snowman (graphic blandishment, 1969)
- A Boy Named Charlie Brown (1969)
- Will the Real Jerry Lewis Please Sit Down (1 episode, 1970)
- Archie's Fun House (1970)
- Uncle Sam Magoo (1970)
- Sabrina and the Groovie Goolies (1970)
- Archie's TV Funnies (1971)
- The ABC Saturday Superstar Movie (1 episode, 1972)
- Snoopy Come Home (graphic blandishment, 1972)
- The New Fat Albert Show (1972)
- The Brady Kids (1972)
- Treasure Island (1973)
- Lassie's Rescue Rangers (1973)
- Mission: Magic! (1973)
- There's No Time for Love, Charlie Brown (graphic blandishment, 1973)
- My Favorite Martians (1973)
- Oliver Twist (1974)
- Star Trek: The Animated Series (22 episodes, 1973–1974)
- The New Adventures of Gilligan (1974)
- The US of Archie (1974)
- The Secret Lives of Waldo Kitty (1975)
- Race for Your Life, Charlie Brown (1977)
- Space Sentinels (1977)
- It's Your First Kiss, Charlie Brown (1977)
- The Fat Albert Halloween Special (1977)
- The Fat Albert Christmas Special (1977)
- The New Archie and Sabrina Hour (1977)
- What a Nightmare, Charlie Brown! (1978)
- The Bugs Bunny/Road Runner Show (1978)
- Fabulous Funnies (1978)
- Tarzan and the Super 7 (1978)
- You're the Greatest, Charlie Brown (1979)
- She's a Good Skate, Charlie Brown (1980)
- Bon Voyage, Charlie Brown (and Don't Come Back!!) (1980)
- Life Is a Circus, Charlie Brown (1980)
- It's Magic, Charlie Brown (1981)
- Someday You'll Find Her, Charlie Brown (1981)
- No Man's Valley (1981)
- Blackstar (13 episodes, 1981)
- The Kid Super Power Hour with Shazam! (1981)
- A Charlie Brown Celebration (1982)
- Flash Gordon: The Greatest Adventure of All (1982)
- Here Comes Garfield (1982)
- Is This Goodbye, Charlie Brown? (1983)
- It's an Adventure, Charlie Brown (1983)
- What Have We Learned, Charlie Brown? (1983)
- Garfield on the Town (1983)
- It's Flashbeagle, Charlie Brown (1984)
- Snoopy's Getting Married, Charlie Brown (1985)
- The Charlie Brown and Snoopy Show (7 episodes, 1983–1985)
- The Jetsons (51 episodes, 1985–1987)
- You're a Good Man, Charlie Brown (1985)
- The Bugs Bunny and Tweety Show (1986)
- Bobby's World (36 episodes, 1990–1996) (animation director)
- The Powerpuff Girls (1998–2005)
- The Powerpuff Girls Movie (2002)
