= Rudy Larriva =

American animator and director

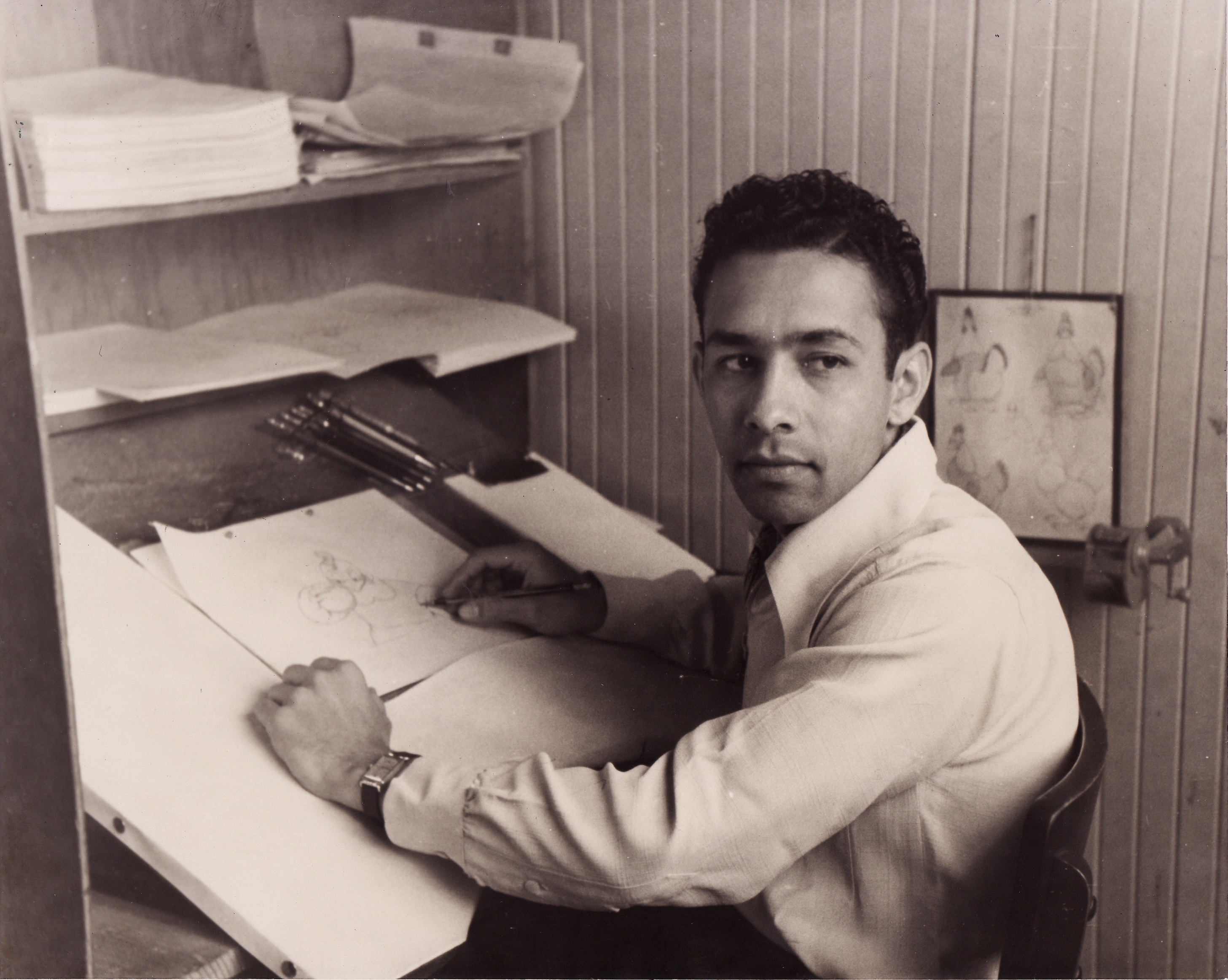
- Larriva in 1946
- Born: Rudolph Larriva; February 12, 1916; El Paso, Texas, U.S.
- Died: February 19, 2010 (aged 94); Irvine, California, U.S.
- Occupation: Animator/Film director
- Years active: 1939–1986
- Children: 1

Signature
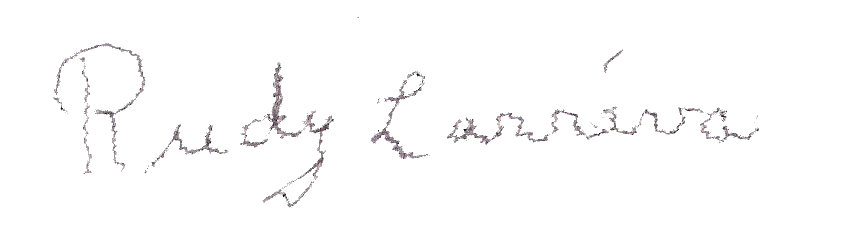

Rudolph Larriva (February 12, 1916 – February 19, 2010) was an American animator and director from the 1940s to the 1980s.

== Early life ==
Born in El Paso, Texas, which his parents moved out at the age of two, Larriva attended several grammar schools, and graduated from John C. Fremont High School with a major in commercial art, but never went to college. He was of Mexican descent.

== Career ==
Larriva worked at a number of studios, including Format Films, Filmation, and Walt Disney Productions, but is best known for his work at Warner Bros. Cartoons and UPA. He was an animator in Chuck Jones' unit, starting in 1939 with the short Dog Gone Modern. He later animated for shorts like Elmer's Pet Rabbit and Porky's Cafe. Larriva was considered by Jones to be his top animator in the late 1930s and early 1940s, where he particularly delivered Disney-quality animation.

Some of the productions he worked on include Song of the South, Mr. Magoo, The Unicorn in the Garden, Gerald McBoing Boing, The Alvin Show, The Lone Ranger, the 1965–1967 Looney Tunes and Merrie Melodies cartoons for Format Films, and Fangface. He was also the animation director of The Twilight Zone opening titles for 1959–1960.

He died in Irvine, California on February 19, 2010, aged 94. Larriva was buried in Eternal Hills Cemetery in Oceanside, California in March of that year. He is survived by his son and his three grandchildren.

Format Films-produced Warner Bros. cartoons directed by Rudy Larriva
Title	Date	Main characters
Run, Run, Sweet Road Runner	August 21, 1965	Wile E. Coyote and the Road Runner
Tired and Feathered	September 18, 1965	Wile E. Coyote and the Road Runner
Boulder Wham!	October 9, 1965	Wile E. Coyote and the Road Runner
Just Plane Beep	October 30, 1965	Wile E. Coyote and the Road Runner
Hairied and Hurried	November 13, 1965	Wile E. Coyote and the Road Runner
Highway Runnery	December 11, 1965	Wile E. Coyote and the Road Runner
Chaser on the Rocks	December 25, 1965	Wile E. Coyote and the Road Runner
Shot and Bothered	January 8, 1966	Wile E. Coyote and the Road Runner
Out and Out Rout	January 29, 1966	Wile E. Coyote and the Road Runner
The Solid Tin Coyote	February 19, 1966	Wile E. Coyote and the Road Runner
Clippety Clobbered	March 12, 1966	Wile E. Coyote and the Road Runner
Quacker Tracker	April 29, 1967	Daffy Duck and Speedy Gonzales
The Music Mice-Tro	May 27, 1967	Daffy Duck and Speedy Gonzales
The Spy Swatter	June 24, 1967	Daffy Duck and Speedy Gonzales

Note: The Wile E. Coyote/Road Runner cartoons in the above list are sometimes called the "Larriva Eleven."
