= Claymation =

Stop-motion animation made using malleable clay models

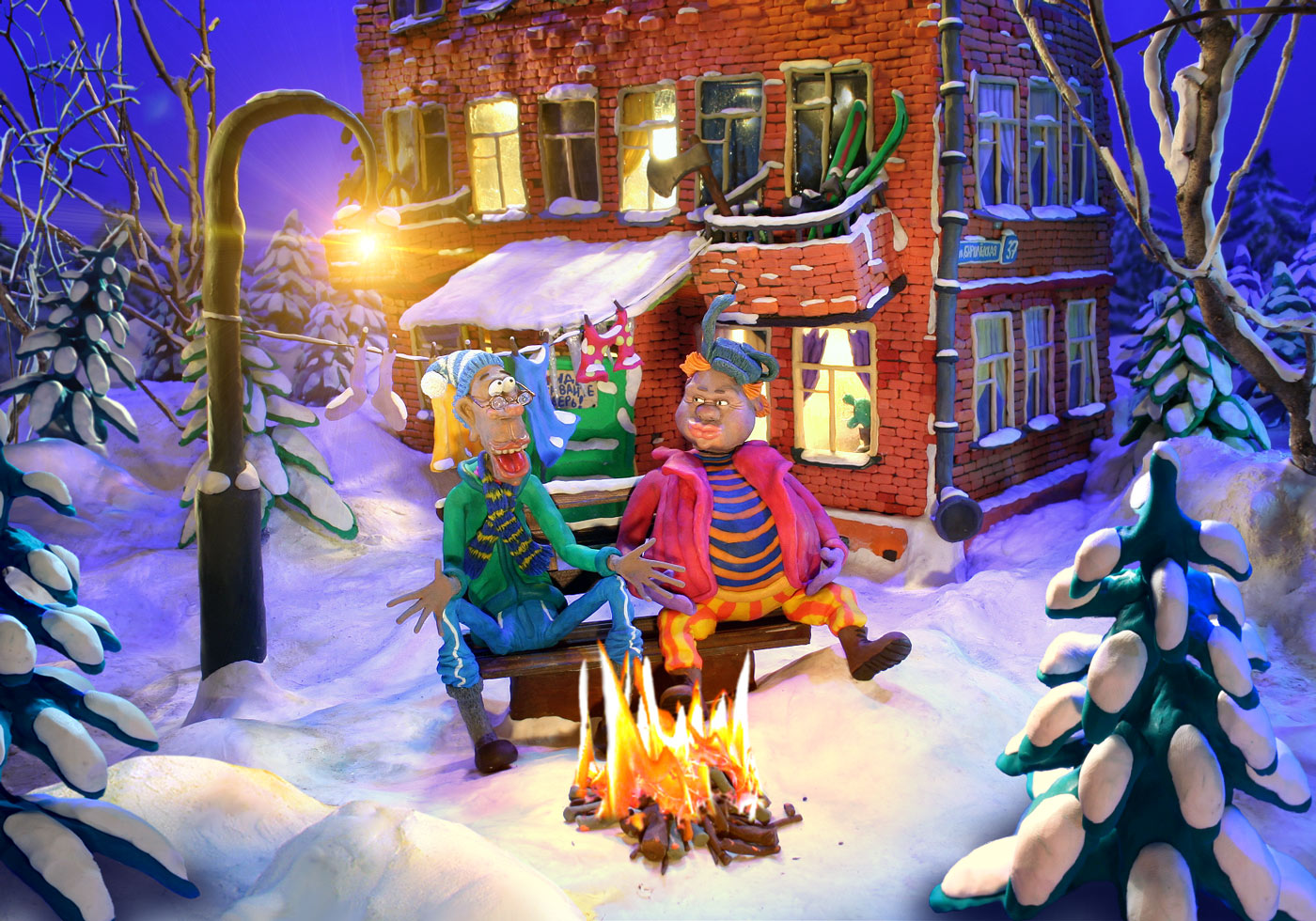
Characters in the animated series From Ilich to Kuzmich

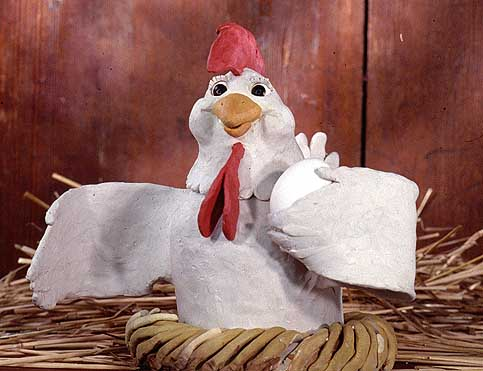
A claymation scene from a Finnish TV advertisement

Claymation, sometimes called clay animation or plasticine animation, is one of many forms of stop-motion animation. Each animated piece, either character or background, is "deformable"—made of a malleable substance, usually plasticine clay.

Traditional animation, from cel animation to stop motion, is produced by recording each frame, or still picture, on film or digital media, and then playing the recorded frames back in rapid succession before the viewer. These and other moving images, from zoetrope to films and video games, create the illusion of motion by playing back at over ten to twelve frames per second.

== Technique ==
Each object or character is sculpted from clay or other such similarly pliable material as plasticine, usually around a wire skeleton, called an armature, and then arranged on the set, where it is photographed once before being slightly moved by hand to prepare it for the next shot, and so on until the animator has achieved the desired amount of film. Upon playback, the viewer perceives the series of slightly changing, rapidly succeeding images as motion.

A consistent shooting environment is needed to maintain the illusion of continuity: objects must be consistently placed and lit.

== Production ==
Producing a stop-motion animation using clay is extremely laborious. Normal film runs at 24 frames per second (frame/s). With the standard practice of "doubles" or "twos" (double-framing, exposing two frames for each shot), 12 changes are usually made for one second of film movement. Shooting a 30-minute movie would therefore require making approximately 21,600 stops to change the figures for the frames; a full-length (90-minute) movie, 64,800—and possibly many more if some parts were shot with "singles" or "ones" (one frame exposed for each shot).

The object must not be altered by accident, slight smudges, dirt, hair, or dust. Feature-length productions have generally switched from clay to rubber silicone and resin cast components: Will Vinton has dubbed one foam-rubber process "Foamation". Nevertheless, clay remains a viable animation material where a particular aesthetic is desired.

== Types ==
Claymation can take several forms:

"Freeform" claymation is an informal term referring to the process in which the shape of the clay changes radically as the animation progresses, such as in the work of Eli Noyes and Ivan Stang's animated films. Clay can also take the form of "character" claymation, where the clay maintains a recognizable character throughout a shot, as in Art Clokey's and Will Vinton's films.

One variation of claymation is strata-cut animation, in which a long bread-like loaf of clay, internally packed tight and loaded with varying imagery, is sliced into thin sheets, with the camera taking a frame of the end of the loaf for each cut, eventually revealing the movement of the internal images within. Pioneered in both clay and blocks of wax by German animator Oskar Fischinger during the 1920s and 1930s, the technique was revived and highly refined in the mid-1990s by David Daniels, an associate of Will Vinton, in his 16-minute short film "Buzz Box".

Another clay-animation technique, one that blurs the distinction between stop motion and traditional flat animation, is called clay painting (also a variation of the direct manipulation animation process), wherein clay is placed on a flat surface and moved like wet oil paints (as on a traditional artist's canvas) to produce any style of images, but with a clay look to them.

A sub variation claymation can be informally called "clay melting". Any kind of heat source can be applied on or near (or below) clay to cause it to melt while an animation camera on a time-lapse setting slowly films the process. For example, consider Vinton's early short clay-animated film Closed Mondays (co produced by animator Bob Gardiner) at the end of the computer sequence. A similar technique was used in the climax scene of Raiders of the Lost Ark to "melt" the face of one of the antagonists.

The term "hot set" is used amongst animators during production. It refers to a set where an animator is filming. The clay characters are set in a perfect position where they can continue shooting where they left off. If an animator calls his set a "hot set", then no one is allowed to touch the set or else the shoot would be ruined. Certain scenes must be shot rather quickly. If a scene is left unfinished and the weather is perhaps humid, then the set and characters have an obvious difference. The clay puppets may be deformed from the humidity or the air pressure could have caused the set to shift slightly. These small differences can create an obvious flaw to the scene. To avoid these disasters, scenes normally have to be shot in one day or less.

== History ==
William Harbutt developed plasticine in 1897. To promote his educational "Plastic Method" he made a handbook that included several photographs that displayed various stages of creative projects. The images suggest phases of motion or change, but the book probably did not have a direct influence on claymation films. Still, the plasticine product would become the favourite product for clay animators, as it did not dry and harden (unlike normal clay) and was much more malleable than its harder and greasier Italian predecessor plasteline.

=== Cinema ===
The Sculptor's Nightmare (1908)

Edwin S. Porter's Fun in a Bakery Shop (1902) shows a single shot of a baker quickly transforming a patch of dough into different faces. It reflects the vaudeville type of "lightning sketches" that J. Stuart Blackton filmed in The Enchanted Drawing (1902) with the addition of stop tricks, and with early cinematic animation in Humorous Phases of Funny Faces (1906). A similar form of "lightning sculpting" had been performed live on stage around the turn of the century.

Segundo de Chomón's Sculpteur Moderne was released on 31 January 1908 and features heaps of clay molding themselves into detailed sculptures that are capable of minor movements. The final sculpture depicts an old woman and walks around before it is picked up, squashed and molded back into a sitting old lady. On 15 February 1908, Porter released the trick film A Sculptor's Welsh Rabbit Dream that featured clay molding itself into three complete busts. No copy of the film has yet been located. It was soon followed by the similar extant film The Sculptor's Nightmare (6 May 1908), directed by Wallace McCutcheon Sr. and photographed by Billy Bitzer with cameo appearances of D.W. Griffith and Mack Sennett. The busts are also animated to blink, speak, drink and turn left and right for a short sequence.

J. Stuart Blackton's Chew Chew Land; or, The Adventures of Dolly and Jim (1910) features primitive claymation in chewing-gum inspired dream scenes.

Walter R. Booth's Animated Putty (1911) featured clay molding itself into different shapes.

Willie Hopkins produced over fifty clay-animated segments entitled Miracles in Mud for the weekly Universal Screen Magazine from 1916 to 1918. He also made artistic modeled titles for the movie Everywoman (1919).

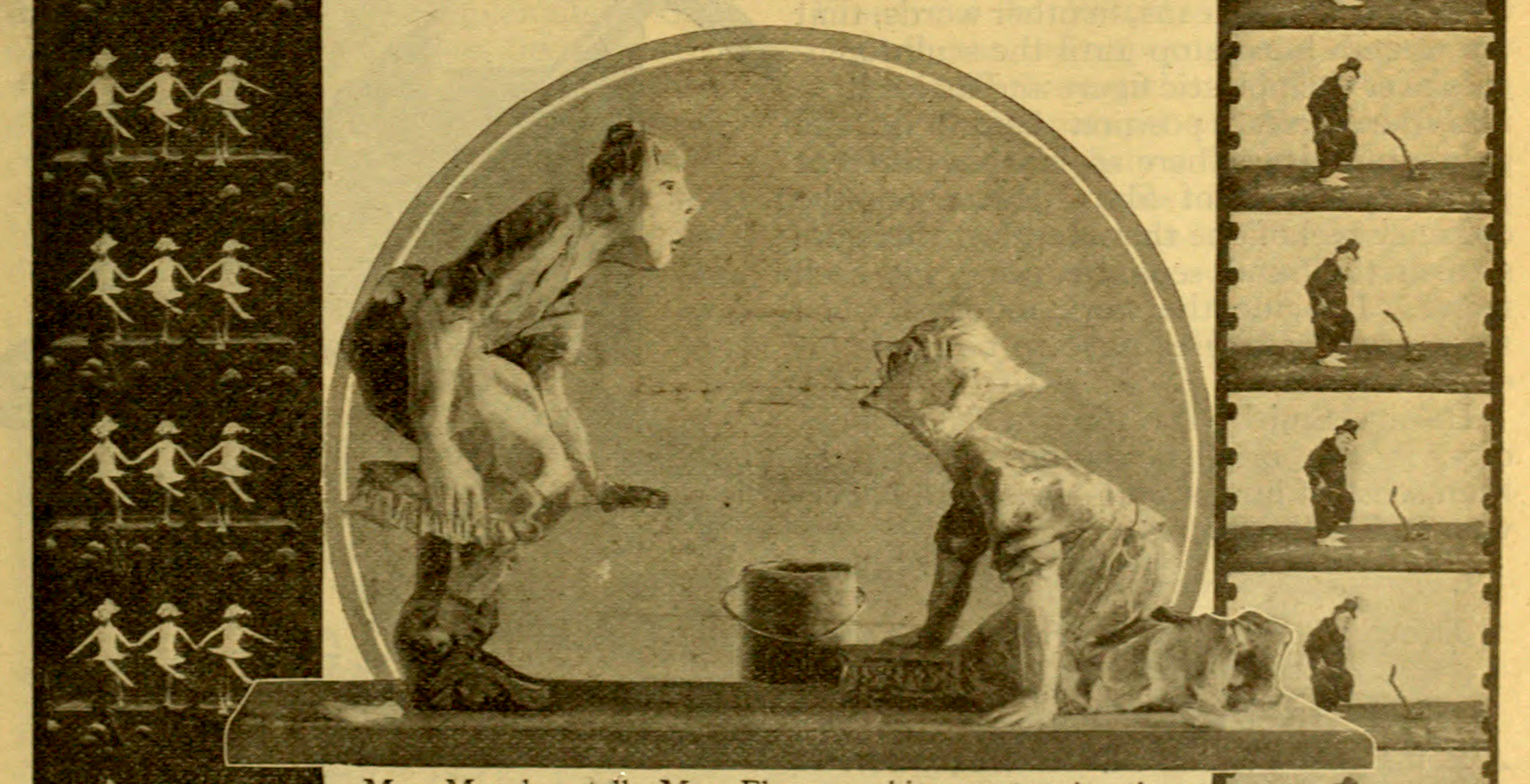
Stills from Battle of the Suds and other Helena Smith-Dayton films (1917)

New York artist Helena Smith Dayton, possibly the first female animator, had much success with her "Caricatypes" clay statuettes before she began experimenting with claymation. Some of her first resulting short films were screened on 25 March 1917. She released an adaptation of William Shakespeare's Romeo and Juliet circa half a year later. Although the films and her technique received much attention from the press, it seems she did not continue making films after she returned to New York from managing a YMCA in Paris around 1918. None of her films have yet surfaced, but the extant magazine articles have provided several stills and circa 20 poorly printed frames from two film strips.

In 1921, claymation appeared in a short sequence in the Out of the Inkwell episode Modeling, a film from the newly formed Fleischer Brothers studio. Modeling included animated clay in eight shots, a novel integration of the technique into an existing cartoon series and one of the rare uses of claymation in a theatrical short from the 1920s.

By the 1920s, drawn animation using either cels or the slash system was firmly established in the U.S. as the dominant mode of animation production. Increasingly, three-dimensional forms such as clay were driven into relative obscurity as the cel method became the preferred method for the studio cartoon. Cel animation can be more easily divided into small tasks performed by many workers, like an assembly line.

The oldest known extant claymation film (with claymation as its main production method) is Long Live the Bull (1926) by Joseph Sunn.

Long Live the Bull (1926), the oldest known extant claymation film.

Claymation has been used in Academy Award-winning short films such as Closed Mondays (Will Vinton and Bob Gardiner, 1974) and The Sand Castle (1977).

Nick Park joined Aardman in 1985. Early in his career, he and Aardman helped make the award-winning animated video for Peter Gabriel's song "Sledgehammer" in 1986. Park would become the most successful claymation director, receiving a total of six Academy Award nominations and winning four with Creature Comforts (1989) (the first Wallace & Gromit film A Grand Day Out was also nominated), The Wrong Trousers (1993), A Close Shave (1995) and Wallace & Gromit: The Curse of the Were-Rabbit (2005). Wallace & Gromit spin-off Shaun the Sheep has also proved hugely successful with long-running television series (since 2007), theatrical movies and its own spin-off Timmy Time (since 2009).

Aardman's Chicken Run (2000) became the highest-grossing stop motion animated film in history.

Aardman's Flushed Away is a CGI replication of claymation.

Alexander Tatarsky managed to get work at Multtelefilm division of Studio Ekran with the help of Eduard Uspensky who wrote the screenplay for Tatarsky's first director's effort — Plasticine Crow (1981), which also happened to be Soviet first claymation film. After the enormous success Tatarsky was offered to create new opening and closing sequences for the popular children's TV show Good Night, Little Ones! also made of plasticine; they were later included into the Guinness Book of Records by the number of broadcasts. It was followed by two other claymation shorts: New Year's Eve Song by Ded Moroz (1982) and Last Year's Snow Was Falling (1983).

Garri Bardin directed several claymation comedy films, including Break!, a parody on a boxing match for which Bardin received a Golden Dove award at the 1986 Dok Leipzig.

Many independent young filmmakers have published claymations online, on such sites as Newgrounds.

=== Television ===
Art Clokey's short student film Gumbasia (1955) featured all kinds of clay objects changing shape and moving to a jazz tune. He also created the iconic character Gumby that would feature in segments in Howdy Doody in 1955 and 1956, and afterwards got his own television series (1957–1969, 1987–1989) and a theatrical film (1995). Clokey also produced Davey and Goliath (1960–2004) for the United Lutheran Church in America.

Pioneering the clay painting technique was one-time Will Vinton Studios animator Joan Gratz, first in her Oscar-nominated film The Creation (1980), and then in her Oscar-winning Mona Lisa Descending a Staircase, filmed in 1992. Another Vinton animator, Craig Bartlett, developed a technique in which he not only used clay painting but sometimes built up clay images that rose off the plane of the flat support platform toward the camera lens to give a more 3-D stop-motion look to his Hey Arnold! films.

Claymation has been popularized on television in children's shows such as Mio Mao (1970–1976, 2002–2007 - Italy), The Red and the Blue (1976 - Italy) and Pingu (1990–2000 - Switzerland, 2003–2006 - U.K.)

In 1972, at Marc Chinoy's Cineplast Films Studio in Munich, Germany, André Roche created a set of clay-animated German-language-instruction films (for non-German-speaking children) called Kli-Kla-Klawitter for the Second German TV-Channel; and another one for a traffic education series, Herr Daniel paßt auf ("Mr. Daniel Pays Attention").

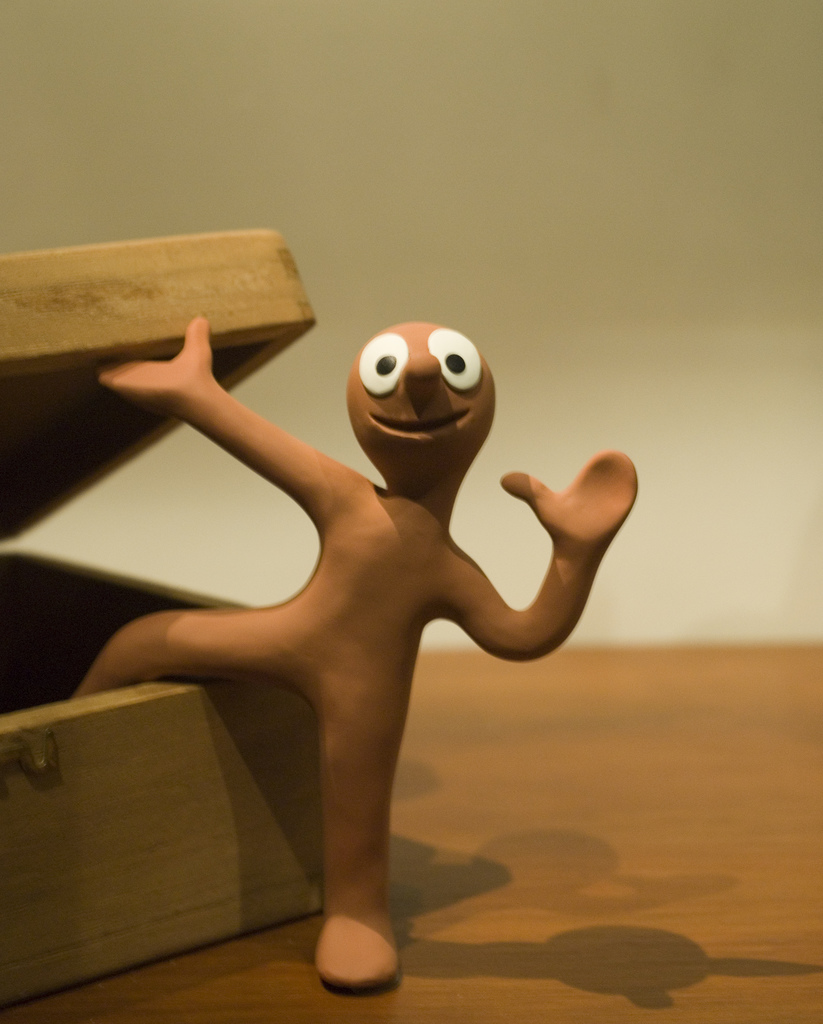
Morph

Aardman Animations was founded in 1972. In its early years, the studio mainly produced segments for television shows, with for instance the popular character Morph (appearing since 1977).

Television commercials have utilized claymation, spawning for instance The California Raisins (1986–1998, Vinton Studios) and the Chevron Cars ads (Aardman).

The PJs (1999–2001) was a sitcom featuring the voice of Eddie Murphy, produced by Murphy in collaboration with Ron Howard, the Will Vinton Studios and others.

More adult-oriented claymation shows have been broadcast on Cartoon Network's Adult Swim lineup, including Robot Chicken (which uses claymation and action figures as stop-motion puppets in conjunction) and Moral Orel. Nickelodeon's Nick at Nite later developed their own adult show, Glenn Martin, DDS (2009–2011).

=== Video games ===
Several computer games have been produced using claymation, including The Neverhood, ClayFighter, Platypus, Clay Moon (iPhone app), and Primal Rage. The surrealist role-playing video games Hylics (2015) and Hylics 2 (2020) both utilize claymation to achieve a distinctive visual style. A notable use of model animation for a computer game was for the Virgin Interactive Entertainment Mythos game Magic and Mayhem (1998), for which stop-motion animator and special-effects expert Alan Friswell constructed over 25 monsters and mythological characters utilising both modelling clay and latex rubber, over wire and ball-and-socket skeletons, much like the designs of Willis O'Brien and Ray Harryhausen. One of the first mobile games introduced to both the App Store and Google Play Store using claymation as their medium was Clay Jam in 2012. Using 2040 different images, 44 lbs of clay, and 400 toothpicks, Zynga Inc. and Fat Pebble teamed up to create one of their first mobile oriented video games. Prioritizing color in their user experience, Clay Jam's stop motion creativity brought the game to life.

=== Art therapy ===
Beyond entertainment, claymation has been adopted in the 21st century as a leading form of art therapy. With benefits of increased confidence, engagement, and stress relief, claymation helped decrease depression and anxiety in hospitalized patients recovering from strokes. Patients claimed they were better able to express their emotions through the practice and application of claymation. Additionally, claymation as art therapy helps patients struggling with early phase psychosis and mental illnesses. With many similar benefits, the therapy also promotes expression and communication in the patients. These experiments lasting between six to thirteen weeks often gave patients options between a variety of art therapy forms, both electronic and physical, however claymation was the overwhelming favorite. Creating a sense of artistic pride, claymation's positive effect carries noticeably beyond the experiment with patients. With claymation's success, it has been an exponentially growing form of art therapy globally. Today, tests are being expanded beyond the initial illnesses to see its effect in other mental areas.

== Notable clay animators ==
- Garri Bardin
- Bruce Bickford
- Art Clokey
- David Daniels
- Joan C. Gratz
- Lee Hardcastle
- Peter Lord
- Virginia May
- Eli Noyes
- Nick Park
- Aleksandr Tatarskiy
- Will Vinton
- Otmar Gutmann
- Jan Švankmajer

== See also ==
- Cel animation
- List of films featuring claymation
- Stop-motion animation

== General and cited references ==
- Taylor, Richard. The Encyclopedia of Animation Techniques. Running Press, Philadelphia, 1996. ISBN 1-56138-531-X
- Lord, Peter and Brian Sibley. Creating 3-D Animation. Harry N. Abrams, Inc., New York, 1998. ISBN 0-8109-1996-6
- Frierson, Michael. "Clay Animation: American Highlights 1908 to the Present". Twayne Publishers: New York, 1994. ISBN 0805793275
