= Northwest Film Center =

PAM CUT-Center for an Untold Tomorrow
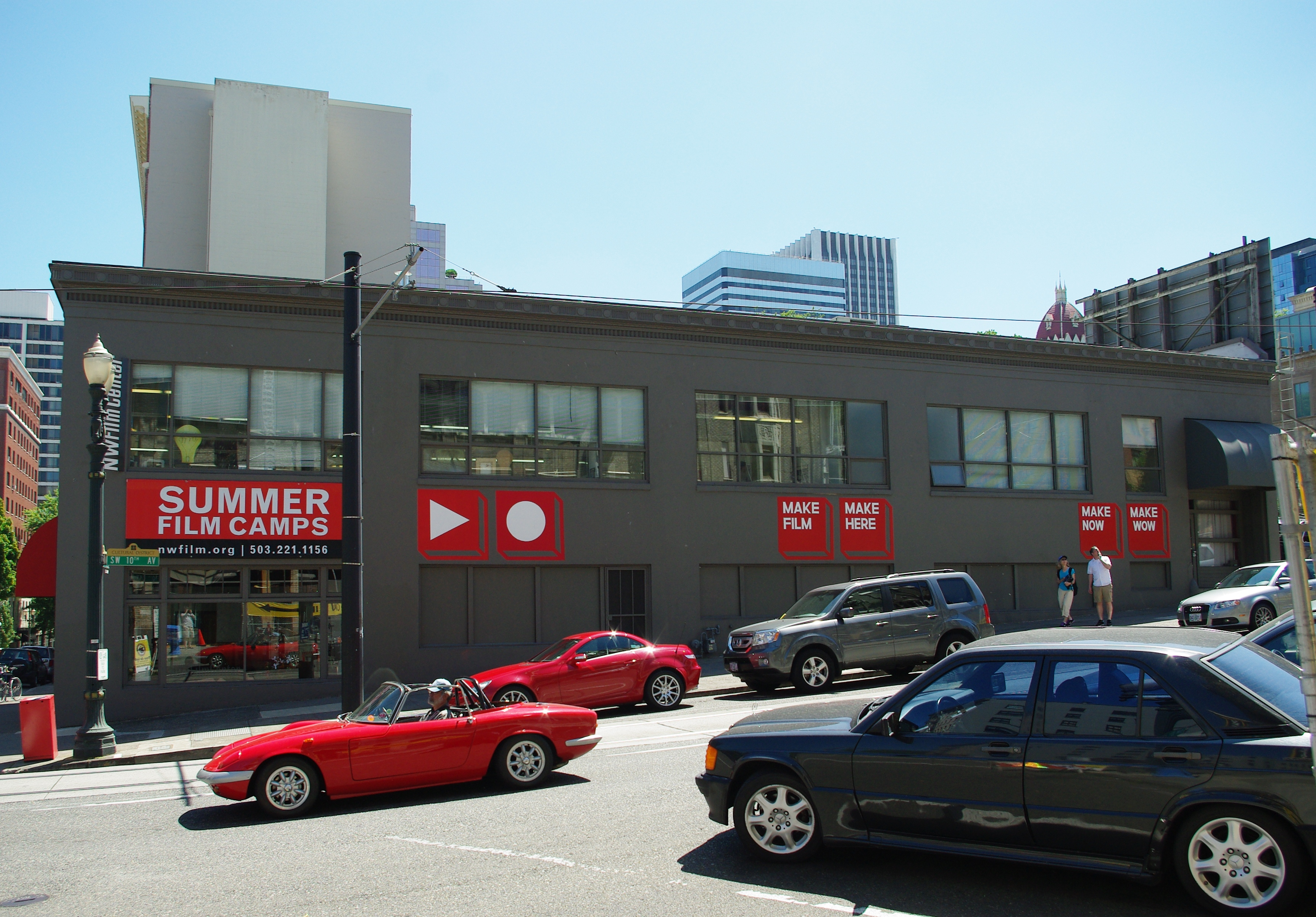
- Established: 1971; 55 years ago (as Northwest Film Study Center); 1977; 49 years ago (as Northwest Film Center); 2022; 4 years ago (as PAM CUT)
- Location: 934 SW Salmon St. Portland, Oregon, U.S.
- Coordinates: 45.5178°N 122.6830°W
- Website: portlandartmuseum.org/pam-cut/

PAM CUT–Center for an Untold Tomorrow, formerly the Northwest Film Center, is a regional media arts resource and service organization based in Portland, Oregon, United States, that was founded to encourage the study, appreciation, and utilization of film. The center provides a variety of film and video exhibition, education and information programs primarily directed to the residents of the Pacific Northwest.

== History ==
The center was founded as the Northwest Film Study Center in 1971, and incorporated into the Portland Art Museum in 1978.

The center was located in Portland's historic Guild Theatre from 1998 to 2006.

Sponsors of the center include the National Endowment for the Arts, Oregon Arts Commission, Oregon Cultural Trust, Washington State Arts Commission, Regional Arts & Culture Council, The Ted R. Gamble Film Endowment, The Rose E. Tucker Charitable Trust, The Paul G. Allen Foundation for the Arts, Academy of Motion Picture Arts and Sciences, and the Mt. Hood Cable Regulatory Commission.

In March 2022, the center was renamed the "PAM CUT–Center for an Untold Tomorrow".

== Management ==
In September 2019, Amy Dotson became the director of Portland's Northwest Film Center. Dotson would be responsible for the Film Center's overall vision, including strategic development, marketing, and guidance of the curriculum. She would also work with the curatorial teams of the Museum, incorporating her vast film and new media knowledge, as well as using her financial, commercial and foreign partnerships to promote the development of the Film Center as a world-class film and digital media production hub.

== Events ==
In the past, events at the Northwest Film Center included the Portland International Film Festival, the Northwest Filmmakers' Festival, Reel Music Film Festival, Portland Jewish Film Festival and the Young People's Film Festival.

=== Northwest Filmmakers' Festival ===
Past judges of the Northwest Filmmakers' Festival (previously known as the Northwest Film and Video Festival) have included Gus Van Sant, Matt Groening, Todd Haynes, Christine Vachon, Bill Plympton, B. Ruby Rich and Amy Taubin.

==== Awards ====
===== Judge's Award =====
| Year | Category | Film | Directors |
|---|---|---|---|
| 1983 | Short | The Rubber Stamp Film | Joanna Priestley |
| 1985 | Short | Voices | Joanna Priestley |
| 1988 | Short | She-Bop | Joanna Priestley |
| 1993 | Short | Pro and Con | Joanna Priestley Joan C. Gratz |
| 1994 | Short | Grown Up | Joanna Priestley |
| 1995 | Short | Hand Held | Joanna Priestley |
| 1996 | Feature | Cat Swallows Parakeet and Speaks! | Ileana Pietrobruno |
| 1997 | Short | Sabor a mi | Claudia Morgado |
| 1997 | Short | Road Movie | Gwen Haworth |
| 1998 | Short | Johnny Bagpipes | Todd Korgan |
| 2001 | Experimental | Passage | Chel White |
| 2004 | Experimental | Grounded | Matt McCormick |
| 2004 | Short | Magda | Chel White |
| 2005 | Short | Darling Darling | Matthew Lessner |
| 2005 | Short | Driver's Ed | Thom Harp |
| 2006 | Most Memorable | Regarding Sarah | Michelle Porter Amy Belling |
| 2007 | Short | By Modern Measure | Matthew Lessner |
| 2008 | Short | Rifle Workbook | Vincent Caldoni |
| 2012 | Documentary | The Sandwich Nazi | Lewis Bennett |
| 2015 | Experimental | Robot Pavlov Sputnik | Oliver Hockenhull |
| 2015 | Short | Utopia Parkway | Joanna Priestley |
| 2015 | Northwest Feature | Frank and the Wondercat | Pablo Alvarex-Mesa |
| 2015 | Feature | Birds of Neptune | Stephen Richter |

===== Audience Award =====
| Year | Film | Directors |
|---|---|---|
| 1996 | CheckMating | William Azaroff |
| 1998 | Johnny Bagpipes | Todd Korgan |
| 2000 | Soulmate | Chel White |
| 2008 | Hirsute | Amy Belling A.J. Bond |
| 2012 | David Lynch & Chrysta Bell: Bird of Flames | Chel White |
| 2012 | Dear Pluto | Joanna Priestley |
| 2015 | For Jean-Pierre Melville | Ira Flowers |
