= North of Blue =

- Directed by: Joanna Priestley
- Produced by: Joanna Priestley
- Edited by: Joanna Priestley; Greg Snider
- Music by: Jamie Haggerty
- Production company: Priestley Motion Pictures
- Distributed by: Priestley Motion Pictures
- Release date: 11 June 2018 (Annecy)
- Running time: 60 minutes
- Country: United States

North of Blue is a 2018 American animated feature film directed, produced and animated by Joanna Priestley with a score by Jamie Haggerty. It is an abstract, experimental film that was inspired by the winter landscapes of the far north.

== Synopsis ==
"This immersive, nearly uncategorisable new world represents a new apex for one of America’s most accomplished and awarded experimental animators, Portland-based Joanna Priestley. While drawing inspiration from natural landscapes during Priestley’s time in Canada’s northern Yukon, North of Blue offers a dense multiverse of images and shifting focal points that explore the tension between two dimensional patterns both familiar and alien. Conventional icons are deconstructed, creating shapes that spark a sense of connection and shared history, while scenes transmogrify from rhythmic explosions to sublime trance-inducing patterns. A truly remarkable work that has to be seen on the big screen." - Melbourne International Animation Festival.

== Plot ==
North of Blue is completely abstract and does not have a narrative structure or traditional plot. The film was constructed with repetition of design themes: grids, tiled images and scenes of morphing shapes that were influenced by the facade of Casa Batllo in Barcelona, designed by Antoni Gaudí. North of Blue features recurring abstract "characters" that include seven scenes with three blue balls, triangles with two line appendages, self-propelling lumps with bumps and flopping line segments that function like railroad tracks.

== Process ==
North of Blue began in February 2012 when Priestley was filmmaker-in-residence at the Klondike Institute of Art and Culture in Dawson City, Yukon, near the Arctic Circle. Exploration of the town, frozen Klondike and Yukon Rivers and nearby forests led to animation experiments featuring snow, ice, braided rivers, trees and birds.

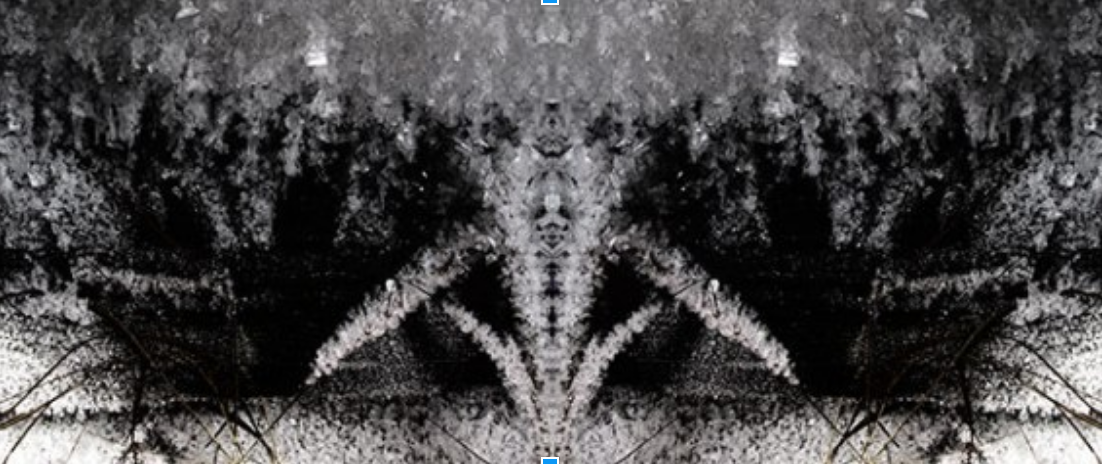
Frost in underground greenhouse in the forest near Dawson City, Yukon, Canada. Photo by Joanna Priestley.

Priestley made extensive photographic documentation of the environment which was later used for reference material and as a source for background images for North of Blue. An expedition up the Dempster Highway with her host, filmmaker and KIAC Film Program Director Dan Sokolowski, into a vast wilderness surrounded by jagged white peaks and tiny lakes embedded with turquoise ice, became a major influence on the film and its palette.

After the month long Yukon residency, Priestley deconstructed the realistic animation, extracting elements and recombining them in non-objective compositions. Scenes were pared down to abstract lines and shapes, featuring geometric shapes and abstract totemic aggregations. The palette was limited to blue, white, black and red, later adding small amounts of yellow and green. Major inspirations were the abstract paintings of Hilma af Klint (1862–1944, Sweden) and the mathematical and mystical elements of her compositions, which led to developing trance elements in North of Blue; and the abstract paintings of Piet Mondrian (1872–1944, Holland), one of Priestley's favorite artists, whose work influenced the palette and the grid structure of several scenes in the film.

Other influences included the work of pioneer abstract animators Mary Ellen Bute (1906–1983, USA), Oskar Fischinger (1900–1967, Germany/USA), and Jules Engel (1909–2003, Hungary/USA). Engel was Priestley's MFA program mentor at California Institute of the Arts (1983–1985), and she was his teaching assistant. They co-directed, co-produced, and co-animated the abstract, animated short Times Square in 1986, and remained friends until Engel's death in 2003.

On two trips to Barcelona in 2013 and 1999, Priestley studied the architecture of Antoni Gaudí. She was introduced to Delftware, the blue and white, tin-glazed pottery made in the Netherlands (classical period, 1640–1740) on three trips to the Netherlands.

North of Blue contains approximately 43,250 animated drawings made with Adobe Flash CC2014. The animation was drawn by hand with a digital stylus and Wacom Tablet, and it took six years to complete the film. Five interns worked on North of Blue for two months (Neisje Morrell, Rachel Bradley, Jesse Bray and Dui Oray from the Art Institute of Portland and Gabe Mangold from California Institute of the Arts and Priestley hired a former student, Laika designer and animator Don Flores. After animation and editing were complete, digital artist Brian Kinkley designed and animated the title sequence and used Synthetik Software's Studio Artist 4.0 for the paint effects.

Before North of Blue, Priestley directed six abstract short films: Split Ends (2013), Eye Liner (2011), Dew Line (2005), Surface Dive (2000), Times Square (1986, co-directed, produced and animated with Jules Engel) and Jade Leaf (1985), and also an abstract iOS app (Clam Bake, 2012).

She described the process of making North of Blue as "deeply joyful" and said, "Every morning, as I arrived at my studio, I had this delicious, expansive feeling of being in a vast, wild landscape, like the Yukon, with all the time in the world to explore new territory and experiment with unfamiliar imagery." She said that "restrictions on palette, composition and content emerged organically and they created fresh focus and new strands of inquiry. The process felt very much like an extension of the spell of the far north."

== Soundtrack ==
Jamie Haggerty composed original music and created the sound designed for North of Blue. It took ten months, and he used Ableton Live and Studio One Pro. Priestley and Haggerty met at Will Vinton Studios where he was an armature designer, composer and sound designer for 11 years. Haggerty did sound design and music for three of Priestley's short films: Dew Line (2005), Relative Orbits (2004, documentary) and Utopia Parkway (1997).

Chris Barber made 85 tracks of sound effects for North of Blue. Most of the effects were hand made and included recording a domino falling, unscrewing a light bulb, cat purring, asphalt shingles being thrown off his roof, and the snap of stretched elastic on his boxer shorts, which made a sizzling sound. Barber also did sound design for Priestley's Choking Hazard (2011).

== Release ==
The film had its world premiere at the Annecy International Animated Film Festival on June 11, 2018, followed by its Australian premiere at the 2018 Melbourne International Animation Festival on June 17, 2018.

== Awards ==
- Los Angeles Animation Festival: Best Feature Film (USA), 12-1-1
- Yosemite International Film Festival: Best Animated Film (USA), 11-2-18
- Local Sightings Film Festival: Best Sound Design Award and Best Composer Award, Northwest Film Forum (Seattle, USA), 9-23-18
- Los Angeles CineFest (USA), semi-finalist 1-19

== Film festivals ==
- Annecy International Animated Film Festival (France, June 11, 12 and 14, 2018)
- Melbourne International Animation Festival (Australia, June 17, 2018)
- Ottawa International Animation Festival (Canada, September 9, 2018)
- Animasyros (Athens, Greece), 9-28-18
- Northwest Filmmakers' Festival (Portland, OR, USA), 11-4-18
- Xcèntric Centre de Cultura Contemporània de Barcelona (Spain), 3-19
- Buenos Aires International Festival of Independent Cinema (Argentina), 4-3 to 14-19
