= Quacker Tracker =

- Title card
- Directed by: Rudy Larriva
- Story by: Tom Dagenais; Don Jurwich
- Produced by: Herbert Klynn
- Starring: Mel Blanc
- Edited by: Joe Siracusa
- Music by: Frank Perkins (score); William Lava (supervision)
- Animation by: Virgil Ross; Bob Bransford; Ed Friedman; Judge Whitaker
- Layouts by: Don Sheppard
- Backgrounds by: Walt Peregoy
- Color process: Technicolor
- Production company: Format Productions
- Distributed by: Warner Bros. Pictures; Vitagraph Company of America
- Release date: April 29, 1967 (USA)
- Running time: 6 minutes
- Language: English

Quacker Tracker is a 1967 Warner Bros. Looney Tunes cartoon directed by Rudy Larriva. The short was released on April 29, 1967, and stars Daffy Duck and Speedy Gonzales. It was the first of three "buffer cartoons" produced by Format Productions in between Warner Bros. ending its contract with previous Looney Tunes producers DePatie–Freleng Enterprises and re-establishing its own cartoon studio.

This is the only cartoon in Warner Bros. history with a music score by composer Frank Perkins, although veteran composer William "Bill" Lava served as music supervision.

== Plot ==
The Tooth and Nail Hunting Society is experiencing a crisis - the one trophy that it does not have in its clubhouse is Speedy Gonzales, and all of their members are injured (apparently from previous, failed attempts at catching Speedy). The chairman offers a lifetime membership to anyone who catches Speedy, but one of the injured hunters tells him that "anybody who goes after Speedy Gonzales would have to be a stupid, idiotic, foolhardy ignoramus." At that moment the clubhouse's janitor, Daffy, offers his services as a hunter and, despite not knowing who or what Speedy is, goes off to Mexico to catch him.

Daffy quickly finds Speedy, who is entertaining his friends with some guitar-playing, and promptly tries to shoot him. Thanks to Daffy's abysmal aim however, Speedy and his friends escape without harm and flee to the safety of Speedy's mouse hole. Daffy invites Speedy to come out and look at a beautiful señorita through his "telescope" (actually a shotgun), and Speedy plays along with Daffy by pretending to see something up the shotgun's barrel. Daffy in turn decides to take a look himself, and Speedy causes the shotgun to fire and blast Daffy, angering the duck.

For his next trap, Daffy sets up a hunter's snare tied to a metal post, and sets a lure with cheese and Tabasco sauce. Speedy takes the bait, but the trap fails to function and Speedy escapes. Daffy checks it out, but then the trap decides to function and ensnares Daffy, hitting him against the ground several times. When Daffy recovers, Speedy runs up behind him and shouts out loud, causing Daffy to run away and in turn causing the snare to catapult him back into the ground.

After this, Daffy uses a wind-up doll mouse filled with explosives to try and blow up Speedy. Unfortunately the doll decides that it prefers Daffy to Speedy, resulting in Daffy being blown up instead. Daffy's next strategy is "Plan X" - disguising himself as a giant enchilada and delivering himself to Speedy's mouse hole. The mice become suspicious when they see Daffy's tail feathers sticking out of the enchilada however, and decide to fill it with Tabasco sauce. The sauce is so powerful that it sets fire to Daffy's hunting hat and sends him rocketing into the village fountain - which Speedy promptly drains, giving Daffy a very hard landing.

Finally, Daffy creates a device from a cannon and a jet engine, and chases Speedy into a system of pipes with it. When Daffy exits the pipes however the device fires him into an approaching train, and the force of the collision sends him rebounding all the way back into the United States, and back into the hunters' lodge via its roof. Daffy admits to the chairman that he's giving up on the idea of catching Speedy and declining the lifetime membership offer, since "with Speedy Gonzales around, life would be too short to enjoy it anyway."

== See also ==
- List of American films of 1967
