= Clay painting =

Clay animation

Clay painting animation is a form of clay animation, which is one of the many kinds of stop motion animation. It blurs the distinction between clay animation, cel animation and cutout animation.

Clay painting animation (which is also a variation of the direct manipulation animation process), is animation where clay is placed and flattened on a flat supporting surface and moved like "wet" oil paints as on a traditional artistic canvas to produce any style of images, but with a clay 'look' to them, filmed frame-by-frame by an animation camera (shooting from above, and in a traditional animation stand) after each small adjustment of the clay images.

The clay-painting process has also been used as a background, photographically combined with other forms of animation, and even live action.

== In the United States of America ==
Pioneering this technique was one-time Vinton animator Joan Gratz, first in her Oscar-nominated film The Creation (1980) and then in her Oscar-winning Mona Lisa Descending a Staircase filmed in 1992.

A variation of this technique was developed by another Vinton animator, Craig Bartlett, for his series of "Arnold" short films, also made during the late-80s/early-90s, in which he not only used clay painting, but sometimes built up clay images that rose off the plane of the flat support platform, toward the camera lens, to give a more 3-D stop-motion look to his films.

Gratz has also collaborated with other animators such as Portland, Oregon's Joanna Priestley to produce films that animated 3-D objects on the flat animation table. An example is Priestly-Gratz's Candy Jam film, made in the mid-90s, which can also be defined as object animation.

Buzzco Associates produced a series of bumpers for Nickelodeon in 1998 using clay painting.

== In Russia ==
In the Soviet Union, the technique was made famous by Alexander Tatarsky with films such as Plasticine Crow (1981 ) and Last Year's Snow Was Falling (1983 ). Typically, the technique was used to animate stories where the narrator wasn't sure of the story he was telling, and so characters and landscapes would morph into different shapes. Currently, Tatarskiy is head of Pilot Animation Studio, one of the biggest animation studios in Russia. Each episode of their current project, the patriotic series of animated short films "Mountain of Gems", starts with a complex clay-painting animation about the culture associated with the story and where they are located in Russia.
