= The Spy Swatter =

- Directed by: Rudy Larriva
- Story by: Tom Dagenais; Cal Howard
- Produced by: William L. Hendricks; Herbert Klynn
- Starring: Mel Blanc
- Edited by: Joe Siracusa
- Music by: William Lava
- Animation by: Ed Friedman; Virgil Ross; Bob Bransford
- Layouts by: Don Sheppard
- Backgrounds by: Walt Peregoy
- Color process: Technicolor
- Production company: Format Productions
- Distributed by: Warner Bros. Pictures; The Vitaphone Corporation
- Release date: June 24, 1967
- Running time: 6 minutes
- Language: English

The Spy Swatter is a 1967 Warner Bros. Looney Tunes cartoon directed by Rudy Larriva. The short was released on June 24, 1967, and stars Daffy Duck and Speedy Gonzales. This was the final Looney Tunes/Merrie Melodies short to be directed by Rudy Larriva.

== Plot ==
A secret strength formula for mice has been developed, and Speedy is tasked with getting it to the Mouse Factory. Unfortunately, Daffy has been sent by a rival agency to stop him. Daffy uses a variety of inventions to cut the mouse off or nab him, all of which backfire on him, or Speedy outwits him. The final plan, a mouse-seeking missile, is changed by Speedy to a duck-seeking missile; Daffy frantically returns to his base, and it blows up there. Speedy pops in the door and says to Daffy, "I want to tell you a little secret. Us good guys always win!"

== See also ==
- List of American films of 1967
- List of Daffy Duck cartoons
