= Candyjam =

1988 film by Joanna Priestley

- Directed by: Joanna Priestley; Joan C. Gratz
- Produced by: Joanna Priestley; Joan Gratz
- Cinematography: Joanna Priestley; Joan Gratz
- Edited by: Joanna Priestley and Joan C. Gratz
- Music by: R. Dennis Wiancko
- Production companies: Gratzfilm; Priestley Motion Pictures (1988)
- Release date: 1988
- Running time: 7 minutes
- Country: United States
- Language: English

Candyjam is a 1988 7 minute 35mm short animated collaboration by ten animators from four countries produced and directed by Joanna Priestley and Joan C. Gratz. The animation was made with clay painting, drawings, puppets and object animation.

== Synopsis ==
Candyjam is a whimsical, animated collaboration by ten animators from four countries. Candy is the subject and each filmmaker brings their own unique style to this experimental film which includes animated candy and objects, clay painting (a technique invented by Gratz), drawings and stop motion animation.

== Process ==
Joan Gratz and Joanna Priestley met at the Hiroshima International Animation Festival in Japan in 1985, where both filmmakers had films in competition. During the trip, Priestley collected Japanese candy, which struck her as stunningly beautiful and elegant. She showed the candy to Gratz and asked her about using candy to make a film together. Gratz suggested inviting other filmmakers to direct segments of the film. Eventually they asked ten directors from four countries to create segments for Candyjam: David Anderson (London, UK), Karen Aqua (Cambridge, MA, USA), Craig Bartlett (Los Angeles, CA, USA), Elizabeth Buttler (Cambridge, MA, USA), Paul Driessen (The Hague, the Netherlands), Tom Gasek (Cambridge, MA, USA), Marv Newland (Vancouver, BC, Canada) and Christine Panushka (Valencia, CA, USA). The directors were asked to create a one minute segment of animation using candy.

The directors sent back 35mm and 16mm film and Paul Driessen sent a stack of drawings on pink paper. The final format of Candyjam was 16mm. Both Gratz and Priestley were fans of Marv Newland's Anijam, a collaborative film made in 1984, so they chose the title Candyjam. Animated short films where multiple directors produced separate segments eventually became known as 'jam films'.

== Release ==
Candyjam premiered in 1988 and was re-released on DVD in 2006 by Microcinema International. It was screened in 11 film festivals and was shown retrospective screenings of Joanna Priestley's films including at the Museum of Modern Art (New York, USA), Masters of Animation Festival (Trivandrum, India), American Cinematheque (Los Angeles, USA), REDCAT in Los Angeles in April 2009, Walker Art Center (Minneapolis, MN, USA), Hollywood Theatre (Portland, OR, USA) on March 10, 2014 and the Sweaty Eyeballs Animation Festival in Baltimore, MD on October 18, 2019.

== Credits ==
- R. Dennis Wiancko (Corbett, OR, USA) - Sound producer and designer
- David Anderson (London, UK) - Sequence director and animator
- Karen Aqua (Cambridge, MA, USA) - Sequence director and animator
- Craig Bartlett (Los Angeles, CA, USA) - Sequence director and animator
- Elizabeth Buttler (Cambridge, MA, USA) - Sequence director and animator
- Paul Driessen (The Hague, the Netherlands) - Sequence director and animator
- Tom Gasek (Cambridge, MA, USA) - Sequence director and animator
- Joan C. Gratz (Portland, OR, USA) - Sequence director and animator
- Marv Newland (Vancouver, BC, Canada) - Sequence director and animator
- Christine Panushka (Valencia, CA, USA) - Sequence director and animator
- Joanna Priestley (Portland, OR, USA) - Sequence director and animator

== Awards ==
- First Prize, Chicago International Film Festival
- First Prize, Black Maria Film Festival (USA)
- Certificate of Merit, National Independent Film Competition
- Honorable Mention, Sinking Creek Film Festival
- Cash Award Winner, Northwest Film and Video Festival
- Honorable Mention, Espinjo International Animation Festival, Portugal

== Festivals ==
- Zagreb International Animation Festival (Croatia)
- Flaherty Film Seminar (USA)
- Aspen Film Festival (USA)
- Mill Valley Film Festival (USA)
- Denver Film Festival (USA)

== Screenings ==
- International Tournée of Animation, Los Angeles, CA, USA
- Museum of Modern Art (New York, USA)
- Masters of Animation Festival (Trivandrum, India)
- American Cinematheque (Los Angeles, USA)
- REDCAT Disney Concert Hall (Los Angeles, USA)
- Walker Art Center (Minneapolis, USA)
- Northwest Film Festival Tour (Portland, USA)
- Cinemateca Santa Ana (San Miguel de Allende, Mexico)
- Canal+ (France)
- Hollywood Theatre, POW Festival Retrospective (Portland, OR) 3-9-14
