= All My Relations =

All My Relations may refer to:

- All My Relations (film), a 1990 short animated film
- All My Relations (album), a 1995 album by Charles Lloyd
- All My Relations (podcast), a podcast about the Indigenous peoples of the Americas

== See also ==
- All My Relations Arts, a Native American arts organization in Minneapolis, Minnesota
