= Portland School of Art =

Portland School of Art may refer to:

== Maine ==
- Maine College of Art & Design, known as the Portland School of Art between 1972 and 1992

== Oregon ==
- Art Institute of Portland
- Pacific Northwest College of Art, in Portland
- Oregon College of Art and Craft, in Portland, Oregon
- Portland Institute for Contemporary Art
