= Adam Beckett =

American animator and special effects artist

Adam Beckett (1950 in Los Angeles – 1979 in Val Verde) was an animator, special effects artist and teacher, most notable for his work on Star Wars.

== Work ==
Beckett developed a unique technique that involved creating a loop of images that continued to evolve with each loop cycle. In this way a series of drawings, say 12, would be shot, modified and re-shot. So while the final artifacts of the film would amount to only a handful of images, the film itself appears as a growing and expanding abstract loop. This was augmented with phasing of the imagery, changing the area of view, and other sophisticated uses of the optical printer.

He attended the California Institute of the Arts from 1970 to 1975 as part of the first class of the Experimental Animation program. While there, he learned from instructors such as Jules Engel and Pat O'Neill, and worked alongside animators including Kathy Rose and Sky David.

In 1974 he began his independent animation company, Infinite Animation, where he continued to produce his own work. In addition to his animation, he taught at CalArts and worked in the film industry, most notably at ILM, as head of Animation and Rotoscoping on Star Wars.

He died in 1979 as the result of a house fire.

His work has been restored by the iotaCenter. The Academy Film Archive has preserved several of Adam Beckett's films, including Evolution of the Red Star, Flesh Flows, Heavy Light, and Kitsch in Synch. His films are distributed by Canyon Cinema.
