= Joanna Priestley =

American film director

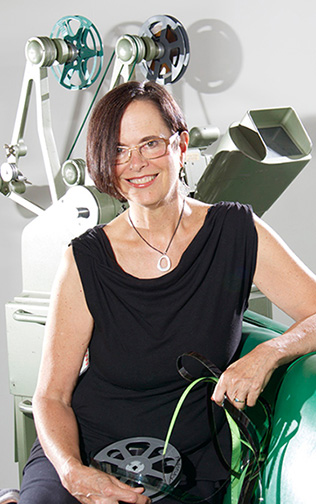
- Joanna Priestley in her studio in 2013, with the Movieola she used to edit her 16mm films
- Born: Portland, Oregon, United States
- Education: Rhode Island School of Design
- Known for: Filmmaking, animation, teaching, Burning Man events
- Spouse: Paul Harrod
- Website: www.joannapriestley.com

Joanna Priestley (born November 25, 1950) is an American contemporary film director, producer, animator and teacher. Her films are in the collections of the Academy Film Archive in Los Angeles and the Museum of Modern Art in New York. Priestley has had retrospectives at the British Film Institute, Museum of Modern Art and Hiroshima International Animation Festival in Japan. Bill Plympton calls her the "Queen of independent animation". Priestley lives and works in Portland, Oregon.

== Early life and education ==
Priestley was born in Portland, Oregon to Mae Irene and Arthur James Priestley. She grew up in a wooded area near the Willamette River with horses, dogs, a cat and a huge collection of comic books.

Priestley began experimenting with animation early in her life. "One of the first toys I was given was a zoetrope, which worked on a little turntable and had little zoetrope strips with it. I loved it! I'm sure I became an animator because of that toy. Then I started drawing on the corners of my textbooks in grade school, and later studied art in high school and college, where I specializing in painting and printmaking."

== Education ==
Priestley studied painting and animation at Rhode Island School of Design and received a BFA in Art (with a minor in Art History) from the University of California at Berkeley, graduating with honors. During her final year there she produced thousands of posters used in protests against the Vietnam War and she was the Art Department representative to the Ad Hoc Committee to End the War.

Priestley received a Master of Fine Arts in Experimental Animation from the California Institute of the Arts, where she received the Louis B. Mayer Award. For two years she was the teaching assistant for abstract animator Jules Engel. Priestley made the first computer-animated film at Cal Arts, Jade Leaf (1985), using the Cubicomp, early animation hardware that was purchased by Cal Arts in the fall of 1984. Priestley and Engel co-directed Times Square (1986), also using the Cubicomp to generate images and recording them on a 16mm Bolex camera on a tripod, positioned in front of the monitor.

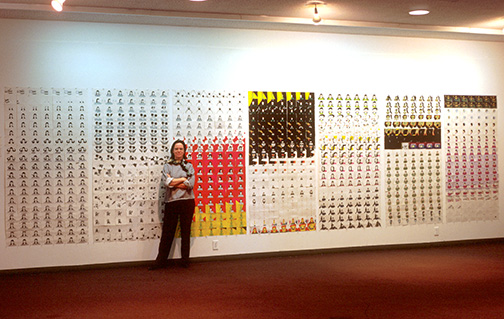
Joanna Priestley at an exhibition of her animation art (watercolor and ink on index cards) from Voices, Main Gallery, California Institute of the Arts in 1985

== Career ==
In 1977, Priestley co-founded and co-directed (with Martha Kelley) Strictly Cinema in Bend, Oregon. They presented film festivals in Bend and weekly film screenings at Bend and Redmond High Schools. She became the regional coordinator, editor of The Animator and coordinator of the Northwest Film and Video Festival at the Northwest Film Center at the Portland Art Museum from 1978 to 1983. Gene Youngblood, one of the jurors of the Northwest Film and Video Festival, encouraged her to apply to Cal Arts, which she did in 1983. In 1988, Priestley founded ASIFA-Northwest with Marilyn Zornado and was President for six years. This ASIFA chapter included the northwest region of the United States which comprised Portland, Seattle, Vancouver B.C., and the areas in between. The organization is now known as ASIFA-Portland.

In 1985 she founded Priestley Motion Pictures, where she has directed, produced and animated 34 short films, the IOS app Clam Bake (2014), and the award winning abstract feature film North of Blue. In 1995–96, PBS and BBC2 broadcast Animated Women: Joanna Priestley, a short documentary with three of Priestley's films. Priestley has directed animation segments for Sesame Street ("“The Lumps: Rejection Victories” and “The Lumps: Social Skills”, 1990), and directed and animated music video sequences for Tears for Fears (“Sowing the Seeds of Love”, 1988) and Joni Mitchell (“Good Friends”, 1985) and a PBS series title: “Making Peace” (1996). After directing and producing short films from 1979 to 2015, Priestley premiered her abstract feature film, North of Blue, at the Annecy International Animation Festival in France in June, 2018. North of Blue won awards including Best Experimental Film at the Indie Film Awards (Amsterdam, the Netherlands), Best Animated Film at the Yosemite International Film Festival (CA, USA), Best Feature Film at the Los Angeles Animation Festival (CA, USA) and Best Sound Design Award and Best Feature Original Score Award at the Local Sightings Film Festival, NW Film Forum (Seattle, WA, USA).

Priestley is one of six interviewees in Martin Cooper's feature documentary History, Mystery & Odyssey: The Lives and Work of Six Portland Animators (2023) alongside Joan C. Gratz, Jim Blashfield, Chel White, Rose Bond and Zak Margolis. The film premiered at the 2023 Ottawa International Animation Festival.

Priestley has received fellowships from Creative Capital, National Endowment for the Arts (USA), American Film Institute (USA), Fundación Valparaíso (Spain), Millay Colony (USA), Klondike Institute of Art and Culture (Canada) and the Caldera Arts Foundation (USA). She was awarded the 2007-08 Media Arts Fellowship from the Regional Arts and Culture Council and her films are in the permanent collection of the Museum of Modern Art (New York, NY, USA), the Academy Film Archive (Los Angeles, CA, USA) and the Library of Congress (Washington DC, USA).

Priestley's influences include Sarah Sze, Hilma af Klint, Mary Ellen Bute, Jane Aaron, David Hockney, Evelyn Lambart, Norman McLaren, Jules Engel, Len Lye and Antoni Gaudi. She has taught animation, portfolio design and cinema history at the Northwest Film Center/Portland Art Museum, Pacific Northwest College of Art, Universidad Iberoamericana (Puebla, Mexico), Santo Tomás Professional Institute (Santiago, Chile), Volda University College (Volda Norway) and the Art Institute of Portland as well as teaching animation workshops throughout the US and in Mexico, Canada, Germany and Norway. She is an active proponent of animation as an art form and has worked throughout her career to improve the status and exposure of animation in academia, museums, galleries and the media worldwide. Priestley has presented two papers at the Society for Animation Studies Conference, including "Creating a Healing Mythology: The Art of Faith Hubley" in 1992, which was published in the Spring 1994 issue of Animation Journal.

Priestley has been an active member of the Academy of Motion Picture Arts and Sciences since 1992 and the Short Films and Feature Animation Executive Committee (2018 to 2024). She has served on the board of the Regional Arts and Culture Council and been a member of the Public Art Committee in Portland, Oregon.

== Filmography ==
- The Rubber Stamp Film (1983, 7 minutes, stamps on paper)
- The Dancing Bulrushes (1985, co-directed with Steven Subotnick, 5 minutes, sand animation)
- Voices (1985, 4 minutes, drawings on paper)
- Times Square (1986, co-directed with Jules Engel, 4 minutes, computer animation)
- Jade Leaf (1985, 5 minutes, computer animation)
- Decanter (1986, co-directed with Jules Engel, 03:12, 16mm, silent, 2D computer animation, not in distribution)
- Candyjam (1988, co-directed with Joan Gratz, 7 minutes, drawings, puppets and object animation)
- She-Bop (1988, 8 minutes, drawings and puppet animation)
- All My Relations (1990, 5 minutes, drawings on paper with 3-D frames)
- After the Fall (1991, 6 minutes, drawings on paper, location shooting)
- Pro and Con (1993, co-directed with Joan Gratz, 9 minutes, 2-D puppets, drawings and clay painting)
- Grown Up (1993, 7 minutes, drawings on paper, pixillated hands and object animation)
- Hand Held (1995, 7 minutes, drawings on paper with pixillated hands)
- Utopia Parkway (1997, 5 minutes, drawings on paper and replacement animation)
- Surface Dive (2000, 7.5 minutes, 1.85:1, drawings on paper and replacement sculptures)
- Kali Yuga (2000, 04' 13", 2-D computer)
- Andaluz (2004, co-directed with Karen Aqua, 6 minutes, 1.85:1, drawings on paper)
- Dew Line (2005, 4.5 minutes, 2-D computer)
- Extended Play (2007, 4 minutes, 2-D computer)
- Streetcar Named Perspire (2007, 6.5 minutes, 1.85:1, 2-D computer)
- Missed Aches (2009, 03' 53", 16:9, 2-D computer)
- Eye Liner (2011, 03' 53", 16:9,2-D computer)
- Out of Shape (2011, 01' 00", 2-D computer)
- Choking Hazard (2011, 01'30" 16:9, 2-D computer)
- Rumpy Pumpy (2013, 01'47" 16:9, 2-D computer)
- Dear Pluto (2012, 04' 13" 16:9, 2-D computer)
- Split Ends (2013, 03' 37" 16:9, 2-D computer)
- Bottle Neck (2013, 04' 13" 16:9, 2-D computer)
- North of Blue (2018, 01:00:05 16:9, 2-D computer)
- PDX PIX (2018, 02' 04" 16:9, Super 8 film transferred to HD digital file)
- Jung & Restless (2020, 06' 06, 16:9, 2-D computer)
- Fleeting Marvels (2022, 04:28 16:9, live action and 2-D computer animation)

== Music videos ==
- "Good Friends" (Joni Mitchell, 1985, photocopy animation), sequence director/animator for Blashfield and Associates
- "Sowing the Seeds of Love" (Tears for Fears, 1988, photocopy animation), sequence director/animator for Blashfield and Associates

== Television ==
- Sesame Street Productions: "The Lumps: Rejection Victories" (1990, 30 seconds)
- Sesame Street Productions: "The Lumps: Social Skills" (1990, 30 seconds, drawings on paper with 3-D frames)
- PBS Series Title: "Making Peace" (1996, 60 seconds, drawings on paper)

== DVD compilations and iOS app ==
- Fighting Gravity DVD (2005, 67 min.), ten short films by Priestley
- Relative Orbits DVD (2005, 78.5 min.), eight short films and two documentaries produced and directed by Priestley.
- Best of Tricky Women 2009 DVD (2009, 60 min.), contains Streetcar Named Perspire by Priestley
- Clam Bake (2012, iOS app for iPhone/iPad/iPod, 2-D computer/experimental flash art)
- Escape Velocity DVD (2015, 39 min.), nine animated short films produced and directed by Priestley
- Venus Twist DVD (2015, 55 min.) seven animated short films produced and directed by Priestley, with a behind the scenes documentary

== Retrospectives ==
- 2026. Tokyo University of the Arts (Yokohama, Japan)
- 2024. PFCAT Oregon Museum of Science and Industry (Portland, OR, USA)
- 2023. Universidad Iberoamericana (Puebla, Mexico)
- 2023. University of Maryland, Baltimore County (Baltimore, MD, USA)
- 2019. Sweaty Eyeballs Animation Festival (Baltimore, MD, USA)
- 2019. Fantoche International Animation Festival (Baden, Switzerland)
- 2017. An Evening with Joanna Priestley (NW Film Center, Portland, OR)
- 2017. British Film Institute, National Film Theater (London, UK)
- 2017. Stuttgart International Animation Festival (Stuttgart, Germany)
- 2016. Tricky Women Animation Festival (Vienna, Austria)
- 2015. Art Education Conference (Kutztown University, Kutztown, PA, USA)
- 2015. Cinema Pacific Festival (Jordan Schnitzer Museum of Art, Eugene, OR)
- 2014. POW Festival (Portland, OR) Received POW Festival Pioneer
- 2013. Sisters Movie House (Sisters, OR)
- 2013. Northwest Film Center, Portland Art Museum (Portland, OR)
- 2009. Cinemateca Santa Ana (San Miguel de Allende, Mexico)
- 2009. Redcat (Los Angeles, CA)
- 2005. American Cinematheque (Los Angeles, CA)
- 2005. Jeonju International Film Festival (Jeonju, Korea)
- 2005. Walker Art Center (Minneapolis, MN)
- 2003. Northwest Film Center, Portland Art Museum (Portland, OR)
- 2000. Museum of Modern Art (New York, NY)
- 2000. Masters of Animation (Trivandrum, India)
- 2000. Pacific Film Archive (Berkeley, CA)
- 1995. Animerter Dager (Oslo, Norway)
- 1994. Stuttgart International Animation Festival (Stuttgart Germany)
- 1990. Center for Contemporary Art (Warsaw, Poland)

== Awards/accolades ==
- 2018: Los Angeles Animation Festival (USA): Best Feature Film for North of Blue 12-1-1
- 2018: Yosemite International Film Festival (USA): Best Animated Film for North of Blue 11-2-18
- 2018: Local Sightings Film Festival (Seattle, USA): Best Sound Design Award and Best Feature Original Score Award for North of Blue
- 2018: European International Film Festival (Saint Petersburg, Russia): Finalist for North of Blue
- 2016: Hiroshima International Animation Festival (Japan): Best of the World Program for Bottle Neck
- 2014: Black Maria Film Festival (USA): Director's Choice Award for Split EndsF
- 2014: POW Fest (Portland, OR, USA): Priestley given the Pioneer Award
- 2013: Ann Arbor Film Festival (MI, USA): Art & Science Award for Dear Pluto
- 2012: ASIFA-San Francisco Film Festival (CA, USA): First Place, Independent Animation for Dear Pluto
- 2011: USA Film Festival (Dallas, TX, USA): First Prize for Eye Liner
- 2011: Black Maria Film Festival (Jersey City, NJ, USA): Second Prize for Eye Liner
- 2009: Black Maria Film Festival (Jersey City, NJ, USA): First Prize (Jury Award) for Missed Aches
- 2009: USA Film Festival (Houston, TX, USA): Finalist for Missed Aches
- 2008: Regional Arts and Culture Council (Portland, OR, USA): Priestley awarded the Media Arts Fellowship
- 2005: Big Muddy Film Festival (Carbondale, IL, USA): First Prize for Dew Line
- 2004: Black Maria Film Festival (Jersey City, NJ, USA): Director's Choice Award for Andaluz (co-directed with Karen Aqua)
- 2004: ASIFA Festival (USA): Excellence in Experimental Techniques Award for Andaluz (co-directed with Karen Aqua)
- 2001: Tricky Women Animation Festival (Vienna, Austria): First Prize/City of Vienna Prize
- 2000: Seoul International Cartoon and Animation Festival (South Korea): First Place Award for Expression for Surface Dive
- 2000: World Animation Celebration (Los Angeles, CA, USA): Second Prize: Best Experimental Film for Surface Dive
- 1998: Northwest Film and Video Festival (Portland, OR, USA): Judges award for Utopia Parkway
- 1997: San Francisco International Film Festival (CA, USA): Golden Gate Award for Utopia Parkway
- 1997: Big Muddy Film Festival (Carbondale, IL, USA): Best of Festival for Utopia Parkway
- 1995: Marin County Film Festival (CA, USA): First Prize for Hand Held
- 1995: Northwest Film and Video Festival (Portland, OR, USA): First Prize for Hand Held
- 1994: Northwest Film and Video Festival (Portland, OR, USA): First Prize for Grown-Up
- 1994: Marin County Film Festival (CA, USA): First Prize for Grown-Up
- 1994: Worldfest Houston (TX, USA): Gold Award for Grown-Up
- 1993: Sinking Creek Film Festival (USA): Best Animated Film for Pro & Con
- 1993: Black Maria Film Festival (Jersey City, NJ, USA): Director's Choice Award
- 1993: Cindy Competition (USA): Gold Award for Pro and Con
- 1993: CINE Competition (USA): Gold Eagle Award for Pro and Con
- 1991: National Independent Film Competition (USA): Grand Prix for After the Fall
- 1991: Athens Film and Video Festival (USA): First Prize for After the Fall
- 1991: Northwest Film and Video Festival (Portland, OR, USA): First Prize for After the Fall
- 1990: National Independent Film Competition (USA): Grand Prix
- 1990: Black Maria Film and Video Festival (Jersey City, NJ, USA): Jury Award for Excellence for All My Relations
- 1990: Big Muddy Film Festival (Carbondale, IL, USA): First Prize - Animation for All My Relations
- 1998: National Independent Film and Video Competition (USA): Grand Prix for She-Bop
- 1998: Black Maria Film Festival (Jersey City, NJ, USA): Director's Choice Award for She-Bop
- 1998: San Francisco International Film Festival (CA, USA): Special Jury Award for She-Bop
- 1998: National Educational Film Festival (USA): Special Merit Award for She-Bop
- 1988: Black Maria Film Festival (Jersey City, NJ, USA): First Prize for Candyjam
- 1985: National Short Film and Video Competition (USA): Judges Special Prize for New Animation Talent for The Dancing Bulrushes
- 1985: National Independent Film Competition: First Place (USA) for Voices
- 1985: National Educational Film Festival: First Place for Voices
- 1985: Algarve Cinema Festival (Portugal): Best Animated Film for Voices
- 1985: Tel Aviv International Film Festival (Israel): First Place for Voices
- 1985: Big Muddy Film Festival (Carbondale, IL, USA): Best of Festival for Voices
- 1985: Canadian International Animation Festival (Canada): Special Merit Award for Voices
- 1985: Northwest Film and Video Festival (Portland, OR, USA): Best of Festival for Voices
- 1985: Chicago International Film Festival (IL, USA): Bronze Hugo Award for Voices
- 1985: Odense International Film Festival (Denmark): Special Jury Prize for Voices
- 1983: New York Independent Filmmakers Expo (NY, USA): First Place for The Rubber Stamp Film
- 1983: Motion Picture Sound Editors (Los Angeles, CA, USA): Golden Reel Award for The Rubber Stamp Film
- 1983: Northwest Film and Video Festival (Portland, OR, USA): First Place for The Rubber Stamp Film

== Personal life ==
Priestley's interests include hiking, medicinal herbalism and designing and producing performative events for Burning Man and All Hallows' Eve. She is married to animation director and production designer Paul Harrod.
