= The Dancing Bulrushes =

- Directed by: Joanna Priestley; Steven Subotnick
- Written by: Barry Lopez
- Produced by: Joanna Priestley; Steven Subotnick
- Starring: Fran Bennett
- Narrated by: Fran Bennett
- Cinematography: Joanna Priestley; Steven Subotnick
- Edited by: Joanna Priestley; Steven Subotnick
- Music by: Miroslav Tadic
- Production company: Priestley Motion Pictures
- Distributed by: Microcinema International (2006)
- Release date: 1985
- Running time: 5 minutes
- Country: United States
- Language: English

The Dancing Bulrushes is a 1985 5-minute 16mm short animated film by Joanna Priestley, and Steven Subotnick using sand on top glass, directly under the camera.

== Synopsis ==
The Dancing Bulrushes is based on an Ojibwa Native American story about Coyote, the trickster. The film was made by animating beach sand frame by frame, on top of a sheet of glass, directly under the camera.

== Process ==
Directors Joanna Priestley and Steven Subotnick made The Dancing Bulrushes in 1984 and 1985, when they were MFA students in the Experimental Animation Department at California Institute of the Arts. When Priestley arrived at the school in 1983, she found that it was not possible to enroll in several classes she was interested in. She decided to create an independent study class to learn a new animation technique. When she asked other students if they were interested, Subotnick responded immediately. They decided to do a film using sand animation and found an Ojibwa Native American story about Coyote in a book by Barry Lopez when they were researching narrative possibilities.

Priestley and Subotnick drove to Santa Barbara to collect beach sand, which needed filtering to remove cigarette butts and other debris. They built a shallow box with a Plexiglass base surrounded by strips of wood to contain the sand. Priestley and Subotnick animated side by side, using their hands, small brushes and tortillons.

== Collaborators ==
The Dancing Bulrushes was written by Barry Lopez and is featured in his book Giving Birth to Thunder, Sleeping with His Daughter: Coyote Builds North America. The filmmakers contacted Lopez and received written permission to use the story as the basis for their film.

The music for The Dancing Bulrushes was composed and performed by Miroslav Tadić, who was on the faculty of the Music Department at California Institute of the Arts. The film was narrated by Fran Bennett, Head of Acting/Director of Performance at CalArts from 1996-2003.

== Release ==
The film was re-released on DVD in 2006 by Microcinema International, and it was screened in a retrospective of Priestley's works at Redcat in Los Angeles on April 20, 2009. In addition to festival screenings, The Dancing Bulrushes was shown at the Museum of Modern Art (New York, USA), Cinémathèque française, Centre Pompidou (Paris, France), Masters of Animation Festival (Trivandrum, India) and the Walker Art Center (Minneapolis, USA). It was also part of Northwest Film Festival Tour (USA) in 1986 and 1987.

== Awards ==
- USA Film Festival (USA): Special Judges Award for New Animation Talent
- Chicago International Film Festival (USA): Gold Hugo Nominee for Best Short Film
- Sinking Creek Film Festival (USA): Cash Award Winner
- FOCUS Film Festival (USA): Third Place

== Film festivals ==
- Athens International Film Festival (USA)
- San Francisco International Film Festival (USA)
- Chicago International Film Festival (USA)
- Los Angeles International Animation Celebration (USA)
- Northwest Film and Video Festival (USA)
