= The Lone Ranger (1966 TV series) =

Animated TV series

- Genre: Western
- Created by: George W. Trendle; Fran Striker
- Developed by: Format Films
- Written by: Tom Dagenais; L.L. Goldman; Ken Sobol
- Directed by: Rudy Larriva; Bill Tytla; Art Babbitt; John Halas; Stan Green; Mike Mills; Tom Halley; Cam Ford; Harold Whitaker; Jackie Huie; Raymond Leach
- Starring: Michael Rye; Shepard Menken
- Narrated by: Marvin Miller
- Music by: Vic Schoen
- Countries of origin: United States; United Kingdom
- No. of episodes: 26 (78 segments)

Production
- Executive producer: Arthur A. Jacobs
- Producer: Herbert Klynn
- Running time: 30 minutes
- Production companies: Format Films; Halas and Batchelor

Original release
- Network: CBS
- Release: September 10, 1966 – September 6, 1969

The Lone Ranger is an animated television series that ran for 26 episodes Saturday mornings on CBS from September 10, 1966, to September 6, 1969. The series was produced by Herb Klynn and Jules Engel of Format Films, Hollywood, and designed and made at the Halas and Batchelor Cartoon Film studios in London, England & Artransa Park Film Studios in Australia.

In 1980, Filmation produced another Lone Ranger cartoon series.

== Overview ==
The adventures in this Lone Ranger series were similar in tone and nature to CBS' prime-time Weird Western, The Wild Wild West, in that some of the plots were bizarre and had elements of science fiction and steampunk technology included in the story. One of the Lone Ranger's archenemies in the animated series was a dwarf named Tiny Tom and his giant henchman named Goliath; an analogue to The Wild Wild West's Dr. Miguelito Loveless and his giant companion Voltaire. Other supervillain-style foes in the series included the Fly, the Frog People, the Black Widow, the Queen Bee, the Iron Giant, Mephisto, Mr. Happy, Mr. Midas, the Rainmaker and Shandarr the Puppetmaster.

== Cast ==
- Michael Rye — Lone Ranger
- Shepard Menken — Tonto
- Dick Beals — Tiny Tom
- Agnes Moorehead — The Black Widow
- Hans Conried — Mephisto
- Paul Winchell — The Rainmaker

== Production ==
The Lone Ranger's voice was provided by Michael Rye {r.n. John Michael Riorden Billsbury}, and Shepard Menken provided that of Tonto. The narrator in the opening titles was Marvin Miller, whose narration ran:

When the factories first began to send their pall of smoke over the cities, and farmlands of the East offered only the barest living, Americans turned their faces toward the West. They poured into the new territory by the thousands--fording the mighty rivers, climbing the mountains, fighting Indians and outlaws--praying...toiling...dying.

It was a hard land, a hostile land. Only the strong survived...a new American breed--the pioneer.
In this forge upon this anvil was hammered out a man who became a legend...a daring and resourceful man who hated thievery and oppression.
His face masked...his true name unknown...with his faithful Indian companion at his side, he thundered across the West on his great white stallion, appearing out of nowhere to strike down injustice and outlawry...and then, vanishing as mysteriously as he came.
His sign: a silver bullet.

His name: The Lone Ranger!!!

Other guest voices were provided by Paul Winchell, Agnes Moorehead, and Hans Conried.

The animation was limited. But the backgrounds had a dark style, with blocks of color elided from the line, which visually set the show apart from many other cartoon TV series of the time. The distinct atmospheric music was composed by Vic Schoen, who also provided the powerful arrangement of Gioachino Rossini's William Tell Overture for the show's memorable opening sequence. Along with the Halas and Batchelor animators, the background department, led by Tom Bailey, Ted Petengel and designer Chris Miles, were responsible for setting the graphic style. The drawings were produced by chinagraph pencil on cell. Colored papers were cut or torn under or against the lines of the background, producing a dramatic and rich textural effect.

== List of episodes ==
No. in season	Title	Original release date
1	"The Trickster / The Crack of Doom / The Human Dynamo"	September 10, 1966
2	"Ghost Riders / Wrath of the Sun God / Day of the Dragon"	September 17, 1966
3	"The Secret Army of General X / The Cat People / Night of the Vampire"	September 24, 1966
4	"Bear Claw / The Hunter and the Hunted / Mephisto"	October 1, 1966
5	"Revenge of the Mole / The Frog People / Terror in Toyland"	October 8, 1966
6	"Black Mask of Revenge / The Sacrifice / Puppetmaster"	October 15, 1966
7	"Valley of the Dead / Forest of Death / The Fly"	October 22, 1966
8	"A Time to Die / Ghost Tribe of Commanche Flat / Attack of the Lilliputians"	October 29, 1966
9	"Circus of Death / The Brave / Cult of the Black Widow"	November 5, 1966
10	"El Conquistador / Snow Creature / The Prairie Pirate"	November 12, 1966
11	"Man of Silver / Nightmare in Whispering Pine / Sabotage"	November 19, 1966
12	"Mastermind / The Lost Tribe of Golden Giants / Monster of Scavenger Crossing"	January 7, 1967
13	"The Black Panther / Thomas the Great / Island of the Black Widow"	January 14, 1967
14	"Paddle Wheeling Pirates / A Day at Death's Head Pass / The Mad, Mad, Mad, Mad Scientist"	September 9, 1967
15	"The Kid / Stone Hawk / Sky Raiders"	September 16, 1967
16	"The Man from Pinkerton / Tonto and the Devil Spirits / The Deadly Glassman"	September 23, 1967
17	"The Black Knight of Death / Taka / Fire Rain"	September 30, 1967
18	"The Secret of Warlock / Wolfmaster / Death Hunt"	October 7, 1967
19	"The Terrible Tiny Tom / Fire Monster / The Iron Giant"	October 14, 1967
20	"Town Tamers, Inc. / Curse of the Devil Dolls / It Came from Below"	October 21, 1967
21	"Black Arrow / The Rainmaker / Flight of the Hawk"	October 28, 1967
22	"The Avenger / Battle at Barnaby's Bend / Puppetmaster's Revenge"	November 4, 1967
23	"Reign of the Queen Bee / Kingdom of Terror / Quicksilver"	November 11, 1967
24	"The Legend of Cherokee Smith / The Day the West Stood Still / Border Rats"	November 18, 1967
25	"Lash and the Arrow / Spectre of Death / Mr. Happy"	January 6, 1968
26	"Mr. Midas / The Birdman / Dr Destructo"	January 13, 1968
