= Northwest Filmmakers' Festival =

Annual film festival in Portland, Oregon

The Northwest Filmmakers' Festival is an annual film festival in Portland, Oregon, U.S. It is a juried survey of new moving image arts by independent filmmakers from the Northwest United States (Alaska, Idaho, Montana, Oregon, Washington) and British Columbia. It is presented by the Northwest Film Center, a component of the Portland Art Museum.

The Festival draws over 400 entries in all genres from shorts and documentaries to feature-length films and is judged by a prominent filmmaker, academic curator, or critic. It is attended by more than 35,000 people and draws national attention.

Generally, 30 to 45 shorts, features, and documentaries are screened during the Festival. Ten to 15 shorts are selected for the Best of the Northwest Touring program, which is available for screening at media arts centers, museums, arts councils, libraries and other arts venues.

In 2011, the Northwest Filmmakers' Festival changed its name from the Northwest Film & Video Festival which it had used since 1973.

The festival occurs in the first weeks of November each year and includes an opening night party following a screening of short films and continues for ten days with nightly screenings, workshops, and social events. The Festival also hosts a one-day BarCamp where filmmakers organize their own conferences and discuss issues important to them. The Northwest Filmmakers' Festival does not charge filmmakers a fee to enter their work.

== See also ==
- Culture of Portland, Oregon
- List of film festivals in the United States
