= Clay Jam =

2012 video game

- Developer: Fat Pebble
- Publisher: Zynga
- Platform: Mobile
- Release: iOS, Android; November 29, 2012 • March 27, 2026
- Genre: Claymation
- Modes: Single-player, multiplayer

Clay Jam is a claymation mobile game created by UK developer Fat Pebble and published by Zynga. It was released on November 29, 2012 on iOS and Android. The handmade, stop-motion game was created in a UK garage by Fat Pebble developers. In the game, players guide a clay ball over a series of hills with the objective of squashing monsters on the way down. As of November 2018 the game is no longer available on the Google Play Store, along with Play-Doh Jam, their Play-Doh-related sequel, which is still unavailable on the App Store. On March 27th, 2026, An official revive was released onto the App Store, and the Google Play Store, under the name of Clay Jam Classic by the original developers.

== Gameplay ==
The goal of the game is to squash as many clay monsters as possible. As the clay ball rolls down a hill, the ball grows larger and rolls faster as it squashes beasts. As the ball nears the end of the course, players try to flick it as far as possible. The further the ball goes, the more points a player scores, enabling them to unlock new levels, themes and monsters. The game includes a total of 130 quests and five hills to master.

The base game is free to play, and all the content can be unlocked by playing the game or through in-app purchases.

== Development ==
Clay Jam is Brighton, England-based developer Fat Pebble's first game as an independent studio. To produce the game's graphics, art director Chris Roe modeled monsters out of 44 pounds of clay and used 400 toothpicks to scaffold the designs. Roe created the claymation scenes in his garage, taking 2040 stop-motion frames. Everyday objects were used to create the sound effects and local musicians were employed to produce the game's music. Zynga published Clay Jam on November 29, 2012, for iOS and Android as its first claymation title. The game is the fifth title in the Zynga Partners for Mobile program, Zynga's effort to help third parties publish mobile games while increasing Zynga's presence on mobile devices. Launched in June 2012, the partnership includes Fat Pebble, Atari, Crash Lab, Phosphor Games Studio and Sava Transmedia.
