= Ellen Woodbury =

American sculptor

- Born: August 10, 1962 (age 64); Corning, New York, U.S.
- Education: Syracuse University
- Known for: Walt Disney Animation
- Notable work: The Little Mermaid, Beauty and the Beast, Aladdin, and The Lion King

Ellen Woodbury (born August 10, 1962) is an American stone sculptor, former Disney directing animator and character animator who worked at Walt Disney Animation Studios.

Woodbury grew up in Corning, New York, and she earned a BFA in Film and Art from the College of Visual and Performing Arts at Syracuse University. She attended the Experimental Animation program at the California Institute of the Arts under the mentorship of Jules Engel.

== Animator at Disney ==
Woodbury worked for over 20 years at Walt Disney Feature Animation where she worked as an animator on films like The Little Mermaid, Beauty and the Beast, Aladdin, and The Lion King where she supervised the creation of the hornbill Zazu. She was Disney's first female directing animator.

== Full-time sculptor ==
She moved to Loveland, Colorado in 2005 to become a full-time sculptor. She taught Character Animation at the Art Institute of Colorado from 2010 to 2014, and ran a character animation workshop along with her class each week. In 2019, the National Sculpture Society presented Woodbury with the 2019 Marilyn Newmark Memorial Grant.

== Filmography ==
Year	Title	Credits	Characters
1983	The Christmas Tree Train (TV Movie short)	Assistant Animator	
1985	He-Man and She-Ra: The Secret of the Sword	Animator	
1985	He-Man and the Masters of the Universe (TV Series)	Animator - 32 Episodes	
1985	She-Ra: Princess of Power (TV Series)	Animator - 65 Episodes	
1985	He-Man & She-Ra: A Christmas Special (TV Movie short)	Animator	
1986	The Great Mouse Detective	Assistant Animator	
1987	Sport Goofy in Soccermania (TV short)	Additional Animator	
1988	Oliver & Company	Animating Assistant	
1989	The Little Mermaid	Character Animator	
1990	The Rescuers Down Under	Character Animator	
1991	Beauty and the Beast	Animator	Maurice
1992	Aladdin	Animator	Abu
1994	The Lion King	Supervising Animator	Zazu
1995	Pocahontas	Additional Animator	
1996	The Hunchback of Notre Dame	Additional Animator	
1997	Hercules	Supervising Animator	Pegasus
1999	Tarzan	Additional Animator	
2000	Fantasia 2000	Animator - Segment "Rhapsody in Blue"	
2002	Treasure Planet	Supervising Animator	Captain Long John Silver's Pirate Crew
2005	The Zit (Short)	Animator	
2005	Chicken Little	Animator	
2006	Independent Lens (TV Series documentary)	Animator - 1 Episode	
2007	Meet the Robinsons	Animator	
