= Walter Peregoy =

American artist and animator (1925–2015)

- Born: November 17, 1925; Los Angeles, California, U.S.
- Died: January 16, 2015 (aged 89); Los Angeles, California, U.S.
- Known for: Animation work

Alwyn Walter "Walt" Peregoy (November 17, 1925 – January 16, 2015) was an American artist who was a color stylist and background artist for animated cartoons. Among the studios he worked for were Walt Disney Productions 1951–1964, 1974–1983, Format Films and Hanna-Barbera (1968–1971 & 1973).

He received little publicity over his career, but was acclaimed for his avant-garde style. His dedication, creativity and contributions to animation while at Disney earned Peregoy the honor of being inducted into the Disney Legends roster in 2008.

== Life ==
=== Early years ===
Peregoy was born in Los Angeles in 1925. He spent his early childhood on a small island (Alameda, California) in San Francisco Bay. He was nine years old when he began his formal art training by attending classes at the California College of Arts and Crafts in Berkeley, California. At 12 years old, Peregoy's family returned to Los Angeles, where he enrolled in Chouinard Art Institute's life drawing classes. At the age 17, Peregoy dropped out of high school and went to work as a traffic boy for a brief time before starting to work with Disney.

In 1942, he joined the U.S. Coast Guard and served for three years in the Infirmary as a 1st Class Petty Officer. After World War II he continued his art education, studying at the University de Belles Artes, San Miguel de Allende in Guanajuato, Mexico, and with Fernand Léger in Paris.

=== Animation work ===
In 1951, Peregoy returned to the United States and resumed his career with The Walt Disney Studios. Although skilled with these more conventional projects, Peregoy's personal style began to surface. Peregoy's unique style began to mesh well with that of his contemporary, stylist Eyvind Earle. Peregoy and Earle's work on Paul Bunyan (1958) was nominated for an Academy Award in the short category. Their unique style of animation on Paul Bunyan was a departure for Disney. Peregoy continued to work at Disney for an additional 14 years, including select work on their TV commercial unit.

Peregoy was lead background painter on Sleeping Beauty (1959) before embarking on the most ambitious, intelligent, and personal effort, his work as color stylist and background artist on One Hundred and One Dalmatians (1961), and The Sword in the Stone (1963). In the mid-1960s he worked at Format Productions, where he crafted backgrounds for The Lone Ranger plus three short films under a Warner Bros. Cartoons subcontract. He later worked on Scooby-Doo, Where Are You! (1969), and other series produced by Hanna-Barbera.

He returned to Disney (WED Enterprises in 1977 through 1983), contributing his unique view to the design of Epcot Center in Florida, where his influence included architectural facades, sculptures, fountains, show rides, and murals for The Land and "Imagination!" (formerly Journey Into Imagination) pavilions.

Along with Marc Davis, Eyvind Earle and Joshua Meador, Peregoy was one of the featured artists in Disney's Four Artists Paint One Tree documentary. This documentary illustrated the unique interpretation that each artist can bring to a single subject matter.

Peregoy's work has been the subject of one Man Shows at: Stockton Museum, California; The University of Santa Clara, California; Galerie de Tour, San Francisco, California; Rutherford Gallery, San Francisco, California; Chouinard Art Institute, Los Angeles, California; Landau Gallery, Los Angeles, California; Dickie Hall Gallery, Laguna, California; Jack Carr Gallery, Pasadena, California. He has also participated in group shows at: National Gallery of Art, the Library of Congress and the Corcoran Gallery of Art in Washington, D.C.

=== Later years ===
Peregoy taught Background Styling at Brandes Art Institute from 1984 to 1985 as well as Principle of Drawing. In the last years of his life, he continued to draw and paint in the Los Angeles area right up to his death on January 16, 2015, at the age of 89.
