= IotaCenter =

The iotaCenter
- Formation: 1994; 32 years ago
- Type: visual media non-profit organization
- Location: Los Angeles
- Website: http://iotacenter.org/

The iotaCenter (founded 1994) is a Los Angeles-based cinema and visual media non-profit organization.

== Overview ==
The iotaCenter is concerned primarily with abstract animation and visual music, as well as the work of west coast experimental filmmakers. The iotaCenter publishes DVDs of work by artists such as Jules Engel, Stephanie Maxwell and Robert Darroll, and promotes the work of Adam Beckett and Larry Cuba. The organization is made largely of artists, researchers, film preservationists and fans of the art form. The board of directors is currently composed of Jeremy Speed Schwartz, Larry Cuba, Sara Petty, Roberta Friedman, Pam Turner, Angela Diamos, Audri Phillips and Max Hattler.

The Visual Music Village is a Ning-based social networking site organized by The iotaCenter.

The iotaCenter formerly maintained a viewing and research library in Culver City, California, which has since closed.

Over 2,400 items from the iotaCenter's collection, mostly 16mm film elements, are held at the Academy Film Archive. A number of films from the collection, including titles by Hy Hirsh and Jane Belson, have been preserved by the archive.
