= Christine Panushka =

American film director

Christine Panushka is an independent filmmaker, freelance animator, artist, and teacher. She is a Professor in the John Hench Division of Animation and Digital Arts at the USC School of Cinematic Arts.

== Biography ==
Panushka received her MFA in Experimental Animation from the California Institute of the Arts in 1983. During her studies at CalArts, she was mentored under Jules Engel and Don Levy. With Dr. William Moritz, she taught a class called "The Aesthetics of Experimental Animation", which was offered only one time. They were expanding on the scholarly writing of the topic of experimental animation, a subject in which little had been written until that time. In the late 1990s, she was associate director of that same program. She has also taught animation to talented high school students at California State Summer School for the Arts.

Her film work includes Nighttime Fears and Fantasies: A Bedtime Tale for a Young Girl and The Sum of Them. She is also the creator of the award-winning website Absolut Panushka, which featured artwork by Priit Pärn, Jules Engel, Kihachiro Kawamoto, Ruth Hayes, The DeNoojiers and others, during its premiere. The site is no longer active, but an archive of the pages is maintained by the iotaCenter, an organization dedicated to the exhibition and preservation of abstract and experimental animation.
