= Voices (1985 film) =

- Directed by: Joanna Priestley
- Produced by: Joanna Priestley
- Edited by: Joanna Priestley
- Music by: R. Dennis Wiancko
- Production company: Priestley Motion Pictures
- Distributed by: Microcinema International (2006)
- Release date: 1985
- Running time: 4 minutes, 7 seconds
- Country: United States
- Language: English

Voices is a 1985 four-minute 16 mm short animated film directed produced and animated by Joanna Priestley with sound design and production by R. Dennis Wiancko. It was made with ink, watercolor, and pastel drawings/paintings on paper (index cards).

== Synopsis ==
Voices is an exploration of fear of the dark, old age, obesity, monsters, and global destruction. According to Northwest Film and Video Festival juror Marv Newland, "Priestley gets across a series of personal phobias in a refreshing and humorous fashion. We get a superb, contemporary animated film with salutes to historical cartoon figures scattered throughout." Ed Emshwiller described the film as "showing great joy and delight in being alive" and a "message with style".

== Production ==
Priestley began work on Voices in Portland, Oregon, in spring 1983, after completing The Rubber Stamp Film. She wrote the script, rehearsed it and hired cinematographer Jan Baross to shoot the live-action 16 mm reference footage that was used for rotoscoping. In September 1983, Priestley moved to Valencia, California, to attend California Institute of the Arts (CalArts), where she was the teaching assistant to Jules Engel, head of the Experimental Animation Department. Voices became one of three films, along with Jade Leaf (the first computer film made at CalArts) and The Dancing Bulrushes (co-directed by Steven Subotnick), that were presented at Priestley's thesis review. She received an MFA in Experimental Animation and the Louis B. Mayer Award.

Priestley used pencil, India ink, felt pens, watercolors, and gouache on index cards to animate Voices. The movie was made over a three-year period. The index cards were shot on 16 mm film (Kodak ECO stock) with an old Bolex camera that was purchased at a flea market. Priestley used a simple, homemade animation stand that was a gift from Portland filmmaker Jim Blashfield.

== Soundtrack ==
R. Dennis Wiancko created the soundtrack for Voices by using music clips and homemade sound effects. For the squeaky sounds when the cat rubs its tail came from manipulating a rubber suction device in a snakebite kit. Wiancko collected source material with a Tascam stereo cassette recorder and layered the sound master together on a quarter-inch open reel recorder.

== Release ==
Voices was released in 1985 and premiered at the Telluride Film Festival in Colorado. The film was re-released on DVD in 2006 by Microcinema International. Voices was screened in many retrospectives of Priestley's works, including at REDCAT in Los Angeles in April 2009, Stuttgart International Animation Festival and British Film Institute (BFI) National Film Theatre in May 2017, Sweaty Eyeballs Animation Festival in Baltimore, Maryland, on October 18, 2019, and Fantoche International Animation Festival (Baden, Switzerland) on September 3, 2019.

== Awards ==
- Algarve International Film Festival: Best Short Film (Portugal)
- Chicago International Film Festival: Bronze Hugo Award (USA)
- CINE Competition: Golden Eagle Award (USA)
- Northwest Film & Video Festival: Best Short Film (USA)
- Ottawa International Animation Festival: Special Award of Merit (Canada)
- Sinking Creek Film Festival: First Prize Award (USA)
- National Independent Film Competition: First Place (US)
- National Educational Film Festival: First Place (US)
- Odense International Film Festival: Special Jury Prize (Denmark)
- Tel Aviv International Film Festival: First Place (US)
- Big Muddy Film Festival: Best of Festival (US)
- USA Film Festival: Finalist (US)

== Film festivals ==
- Telluride Film Festival (Colorado, US)
- Hiroshima International Animation Festival (Japan)
- Zagreb International Animation Festival (Croatia)
- Hong Kong International Film Festival (China)
- Los Angeles International Animation Celebration (US)
- Denver International Film Festival (US)
- Olympia Film Festival (US)
- Black Maria Film Festival (US)
- Stuttgart International Animation Festival (Germany)
- Films des Femmes: Festival International de Créteil (France)
- San Francisco International Film Festival (US)
- Montreal International Women's Film Festival (Canada)
- New York Filmmaker's Expo (US)
- Bumbershoot Film Festival (US)
- Flaherty Film Seminar (US)
- Womanimation! Film Festival (US)
- Big Cartoon Festival (Moscow, Russia)

== Touring programs ==
- Spike and Mike's Festival of Animation 1987 (US)
- Black Maria Film Festival Tour (US)
- Northwest Film Festival Tour (US)
