= Pro and Con =

- Directed by: Joanna Priestley; Joan C. Gratz
- Written by: Joanna Priestley; Barbara Carnegie
- Produced by: Joanna Priestley; Joan C. Gratz
- Narrated by: Lt. Janice Inman; Allen Nause
- Cinematography: Joanna Priestley; Joan C. Gratz
- Edited by: Joanna Priestley; Joan C. Gratz
- Music by: Chel White
- Production company: Priestley Motion Pictures (1993)
- Distributed by: Microcinema International (2005)
- Release date: April 24, 1993
- Running time: 9 minutes
- Country: United States
- Language: English

Pro and Con is a 1993 9-minute 16mm short animated film produced, directed and animated by Joanna Priestley and Joan C. Gratz using drawings on paper, pixillated hands and object animation. The "Pro" section of the film was written by Barbara Carnegie and Joanna Priestley and narrated by Lt. Janice Inman. The "Con" section was written by Jeff Green and narrated by Allen Nause. The sound was designed and produced by Lance Limbocker and Chel White with music by Chel White. Pro and Con was commissioned through the Metropolitan Arts Commission's Percent for Art Program in Multnomah County, Oregon.

== Synopsis ==
Pro and Con investigates life in prison through two monologues: one by a corrections officer (Lt. Janice Inman), and the other by Oregon State Penitentiary inmate, written by Jeff Green. The guard is concerned both with the inability of our current prison system to deal with the increasingly violent nature of crime and the cyclical nature of crime within families. The inmate reflects on the isolation he feels- how much he misses not only his wife and family, but also such mundane activities as riding in a car. Pro and Con features self-portraits that were drawn by inmates at the penitentiary and object animation of weapons and crafts that were confiscated from inmates.

== Release ==
The film was re-released on DVD in 2005 by Microcinema International, and was screened in a retrospective of Priestley's work at the OpenLens Festival in 2009.

== Reception ==
Stephen Holden of The New York Times called the film "another outstanding short by Joan Gratz and Joanna Priestley". Rebecca S. Albitz, of Pyramid Film and Video called the film "a brief but excellent exploration of the thoughts and emotions of those working and living in our prison system."

== Awards and recognition ==
- Director's Choice Award, Black Maria Film Festival
- Gold Award, Cindy Competition
- Worldfest Gold Award, Worldfest Charleston
- Gold Eagle Award, CINE Competition
- First Prize, Birmingham Educational Film Festival
- Honorable Mention, Annecy International Animation Festival
- Honorable Mention, Northwest Film and Video Festival
- Honorable Mention, Bombay International Film Festival
- Honorable Mention, USA Film Festival
- Honorable Mention, Columbus Film Festival

== Festivals ==
- Bombay International Film Festival (India)
- Annecy International Animation Festival (France)
- Holland Animation Festival
- Sinking Creek Film Festival (USA)
- Ottawa International Animation Festival (Canada)
- U.S.A. Film Festival
- Womanimation! Film Festival (USA)
