= Format Films =

Television animation studio

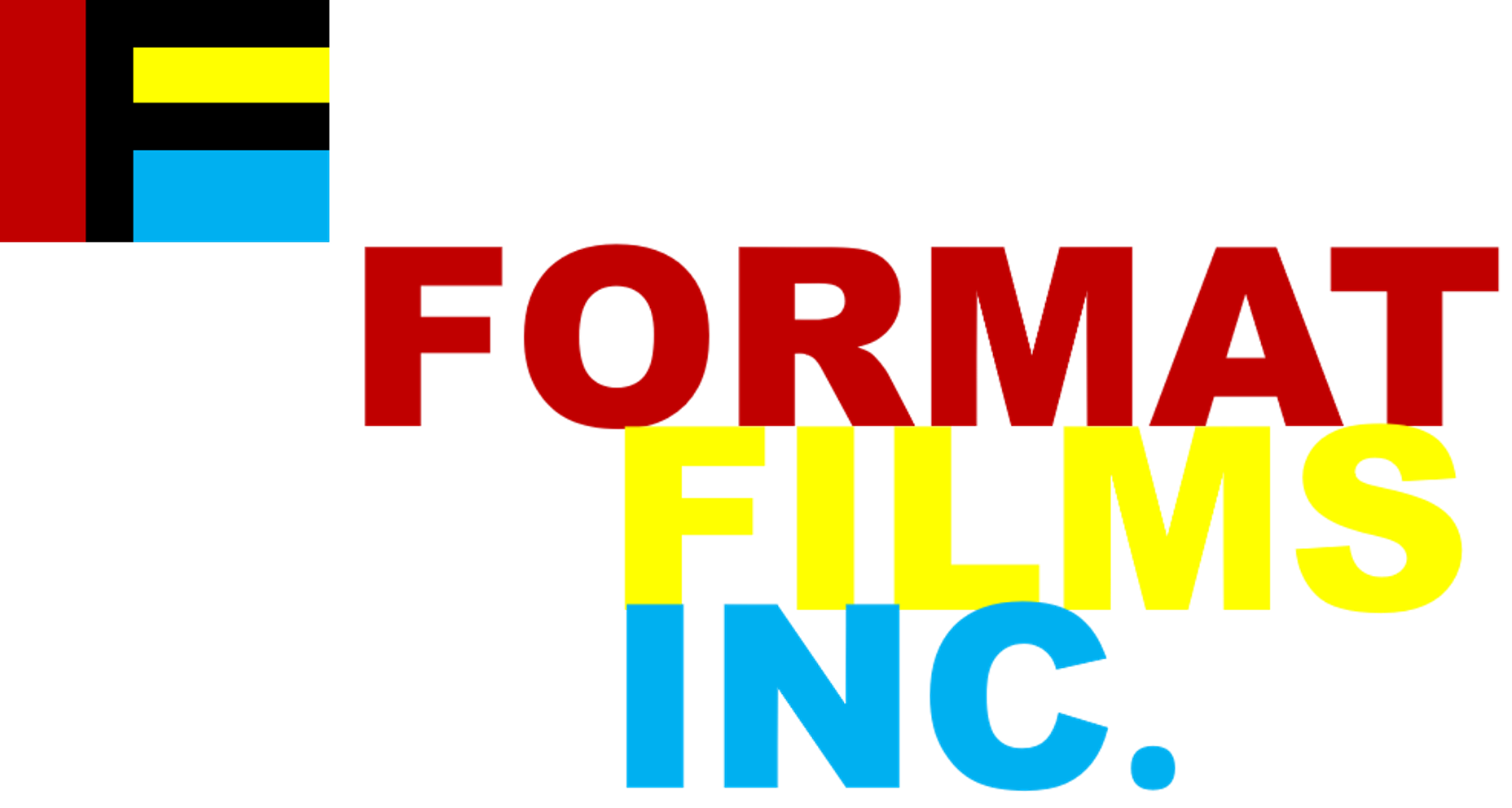
- Formerly: Format Productions
- Industry: Animation
- Founded: October 1959
- Founder: Herbert Klynn; Jules Engel
- Defunct: 1970s
- Headquarters: Burbank, California (1959–60); Los Angeles, California (1960–63); Studio City, California (1965–1970s)
- Key people: Herbert Klynn; Jules Engel; Rudy Larriva

Format Films was an animation studio which was founded by Herbert Klynn in 1959 with Jules Engel as vice president, Bob McIntosh and Joseph Mugnaini, all of whom were animators.

== History ==
Format Films was founded in October 1959 by former UPA animators Herbert Klynn and vice president Jules Engel. When the studio first launched, it had a staff of 15 people, with its original studios located in Burbank, California. The number of animation staff immediately grew by the following year. On March 11, 1960, Jerry Abbott, a Chicago top-sales representative at UPA, took over as vice president for Format Films.

In July 1960, the studio was relocated to a larger 10,000 square-feet building in the Valley Village area of Los Angeles. Following its move to the Laurel Canyon Boulevard building that year, the number of employees grew from 62 people in May 1960 to 125 people in April 1961. At the same time, Format produced a total of 90 television commercials and several industrial shorts within a span of its first two years of business. The company itself was widely known for producing their own cartoon series, such as the entirety of The Alvin Show and over 100 Popeye the Sailor episodes. The Alvin Show was Format's biggest hit, with a budget of over $1,500,000 for all 26 episodes of the series.

In October 1960, Format Films and Mark VII Limited made a reciprocal arrangement for Format to supply animation for Mark VII's television spots. That same year, Format Films released its first theatrical animated cartoon A Tale of Old Wiff (or simply Old Wiff), the only cartoon that was produced in Smell-O-Vision. The cartoon, released on 70mm film, produced by Nathan Zucker, directed by Alan Zaslove, written by Leo Salkin (who later worked with The Shrimp and The Alvin Show) and animated by Mr. Magoo animator John Hubley, bombarded moviegoers with distinctive smells.

Just before the company's Alvin era became Format's stardom, Format Films had already finished making a handful of pilots before its contract was made to both CBS and Ross Bagdasarian, including a proposed half-hour animated series called The Shrimp. In October 1960, Four Star Television signed a contract with Format Films to produce The Shrimp that was originally pitched in for CBS, but was immediately tossed by the Eye Network themselves after finishing its unsold pilot. At the same time, Format originally planned to produce a movie that Four Star denied on making, The Illustrated Man, based on the best-selling Ray Bradbury book, but was never made nor released.

The following year in 1962, another Bradbury-based film, Icarus Montgolfier Wright, was released on December 21 of that same year as Format's second theatrical animated cartoon, and was known for its artistic designs, explanatory history, and poetic writing. The short itself was nominated for an Academy Award for Best Animated Short Film in 1963. That same year in 1963, Klynn briefly closed his studio when Engels left the United States for Paris, France to direct The World of Siné. Klynn returned to Format soon afterward and reopened the studio again by 1965 as Format Productions, with Henrietta Jordan taking over as vice president of the studio. At the same time, its headquarters were relocated again to Studio City, California. The studio made eleven sub-contracted shorts in Warner Bros.' theatrical Road Runner series as well as three Daffy Duck and Speedy Gonzales shorts, and produced The Lone Ranger animated series for CBS in 1966.

== TV series ==
- Popeye the Sailor (King Features Syndicate/1960)
- The Alvin Show (Bagdasarian Film Corporation/1961–1962)
- The Lone Ranger (Halas and Batchelor/1966–1969) (as Format Productions)

== TV pilot ==
- The Shrimp (1961)

== Theatrical shorts ==
- Tale of Old Wiff (1960)
- Icarus Montgolfier Wright (1962) (Academy Award for Best Animated Short Film nominee)
- Looney Tunes and Merrie Melodies (Warner Bros. Pictures, DePatie–Freleng Enterprises/1965–1967) (as Format Productions)
  - Run, Run, Sweet Road Runner (1965) (subcontracted-DFE)
  - Tired and Feathered (1965) (subcontracted-DFE)
  - Boulder Wham! (1965) (subcontracted-DFE)
  - Just Plane Beep (1965) (subcontracted-DFE)
  - Hairied and Hurried (1965) (subcontracted-DFE)
  - Highway Runnery (1965) (subcontracted-DFE)
  - Chaser on the Rocks (1965) (subcontracted-DFE)
  - Shot and Bothered (1966) (subcontracted-DFE)
  - Out and Out Rout (1966) (subcontracted-DFE)
  - The Solid Tin Coyote (1966) (subcontracted-DFE)
  - Clippety Clobbered (1966) (subcontracted-DFE)
  - Quacker Tracker (1967) (subcontracted-WB)
  - The Music Mice-Tro (1967) (subcontracted-WB)
  - The Spy Swatter (1967) (subcontracted-WB)

== Film and television titles (as Format Productions unless otherwise noted) ==
- Outlaws (1960–1962) (TV) (as Format Films)
- I Spy (1965–1968) (TV)
- The Glory Guys (1965)
- Honey West (1965–1966) (TV)
- Clambake (1967)
- The Mothers-in-Law (1967–1969) (TV)
- Hee Haw (1969) (TV)
- Curiosity Shop (1971–1973) (TV)
