= Roberta Friedman =

Filmmaker

Roberta Friedman is a filmmaker and video artist. She has worked on commercial projects such as Star Wars and Ragtime, and experimental projects such as her video The Erl King, created in collaboration with Grahame Weinbren, the first interactive art piece acquired by the Guggenheim Museum for its permanent collection.

== Work ==
Spanning a large number of film and video productions as well as collaborations with new music artists and composers, Friedman's work has been presented extensively in the United States and Europe at the Guggenheim Museum in New York, the Whitney Museum, MOMA, the Pompidou Centre, and other venues.

Friedman uses film, video, and digital hybrids in presenting her film works, such as Straight From Bertha and the Erl King at the Whitney Biennial, the Guggenheim Museum and the Millennium Film Workshop, among others. She is currently working on a video and film project which is an homage to John Cage's 49 Waltzes. With longtime collaborator Daniel Loewenthal, Friedman is using Cage's concept by creating the Cosmopolis Project, a series of video installations with striking visual and sound portraits taken from the streets of Cairo, Beijing, Graz, Detroit, and New York City that reflect urban cultures in transition.

== Selected filmography ==
- 49 Waltzes for the Fashion City: Milan (2017)
- Power To Heal (2017) - producer
- Bertha's Great-Grandchildren (2015) - director
- Cosmopolis: 49 Waltzes for the World (2013) - director & producer
- Bertha's Grandchildren (2011) - director
- A Kiss for Jed Wood (2009)
- Kandinsky: A Close Look (2007) - producer
- Here! Family (2005) - producer
- Hempsters: Plant the Seed (2003)
- Wolves of Wall Street (2002) - co-producer
- I.D. It's Dance (1986) - executive producer
- Terms of Analysis (1982)
- The Empire Strikes Back (1980) - visual effects
- Cheap Imitations Part I: Melies - India Rubber Head (1980)
- Cheap Imitations Part II: Madwomen (1980)
- Cheap Imitations Part III: Point Point (1980)
- Murray and Max Talk About Money (1979)
- Vicarious Thrills (1979)
- Future Perfect (1978)
- Between the Lines (1977)
- Crotchets and Contrivances (1977)
- Bertha's Children (1976) - director
- For Norma and Her Voices (1976)
- Cross Sections (1975)
- Siblings (1975)
- The Making of Americans (1974)
- Amusement Park Composition & Decay (1973)

== Grants, Awards and Festivals ==
Friedman has received grants and awards from NYSCA, NEA, BFI, the Australian Commission and has shown her films at many festivals, including the Athens International Festival, Sinking Creek Festival, Brooklyn Film Festival, FILMEX, Millennium Film Workshop, Berlin Film Festival and the Rotterdam Film Festival.

== Archive ==
Roberta Friedman's film collection is held by the Academy Film Archive as part of the Roberta Friedman and Grahame Weinbren Collection. The archive has preserved a number of her films, including Bertha's Children, Vicarious Thrills, and Murray and Max Talk about Money.
