= The Rubber Stamp Film =

- Directed by: Joanna Priestley
- Produced by: Joanna Priestley
- Edited by: Joanna Priestley
- Music by: R. Dennis Wiancko
- Production company: Priestley Motion Pictures
- Distributed by: Microcinema International (2006)
- Release date: 1983
- Running time: 7 minutes
- Country: United States

The Rubber Stamp Film is a 1983 7 minute 16mm short animated film by Joanna Priestley, using rubber stamped images and drawings on paper. The film was directed, produced, and animated by Priestley with sound designed and produced by R. Dennis Wiancko.

== Synopsis ==
The Rubber Stamp Film was described by Walker Art Center Film Curator Melinda Ward as “An imaginative, witty and energetic film. The images are all made from new and old rubber stamps which combine, entangle and collide at a rapid and joyous pace. A hundred little stories are told as the images zip by to a collaged soundtrack of voices and musical fragments. Pure delight!”

== Process ==
In 1977, Joanna Priestley created a novelty rubber stamp company and sold stamps through the mail and at the Portland Saturday Market. In 1979 she purchased index cards at her local grocery store in Sisters, Oregon and began experimenting with animating rubber stamped images. For two years, all of the stamps that she used were part of her own collection. In 1981 she found two rubber stamp collectors in Portland, Oregon, who let her borrow stamps from their large collections to use in the film.

Priestley used watercolors, stamp pad ink, felt pens and gouache to create approximately 2900 index card drawings. She developed a technique to make images fade in and out by stamping a sequence of cards without re-inking the rubber stamp and used vellum masks to hide parts of stamped images, allowing an image to go behind or in front of other stamps. The index cards were shot in 16mm with a Bolex camera that Priestley purchased at a flea market. She used a homemade animation stand that was a gift from Portland filmmaker Jim Blashfield.

== Soundtrack ==
R. Dennis Wiancko created the soundtrack for The Rubber Stamp Film, which won a Motion Picture Sound Editors Golden Reel Award in Los Angeles in 1984. He collected source material with a Tascam stereo cassette recorder and then layered the master together on a 1/4” open reel recorder. Wiancko used a wide variety of sources for the sound effects and music in the film including public domain audio from his collection of wax cylinder recordings and interviews that Priestley did with film scholar Gene Youngblood (author of Expanded Cinema) and her grandmother, Eva Irene Kennedy, which was used in the "swimming pool" section of the film. Almost every individual stamp in the Rubber Stamp Film has its own sound.

== Release ==
The Rubber Stamp Film was released in 1983 and the world premiere was at the Telluride Film Festival in Colorado, USA. The film was re-released on DVD in 2006 by Microcinema International. and it was screened in April 2009 a retrospective of Priestley's works in April 2009 at REDCAT in Los Angeles, CA and on October 18, 2019, at a retrospective at the Sweaty Eyeballs Animation Invitational in Baltimore, MD.

== Awards ==
- New York Independent Filmmakers Expo: First Place (USA)
- Motion Picture Sound Editors: Golden Reel Award (Los Angeles, CA, USA)
- Black Maria Film Festival: Director's Choice Award (USA)
- Baltimore Film Festival: Second Place (Maryland, USA)

== Film Festivals ==
- Telluride Film Festival (Colorado, USA)
- Hiroshima International Animation Festival (Japan)
- Aspen Film Festival (Colorado, USA)
- Chicago International Film Festival (Illinois, USA)

== See also ==
- 1983 in film
- Independent animation
- Experimental film
