= Kli-Kla-Klawitter =

- Country of origin: Germany

Kli-Kla-Klawitter is a German television series.

== See also ==
- List of German television series
