= All My Relations (film) =

Short animated film

- Directed by: Joanna Priestley
- Written by: Joanna Priestley
- Produced by: Joanna Priestley
- Narrated by: Victoria Parker and Scott Parker.
- Cinematography: Joanna Priestley
- Edited by: Joanna Priestley
- Music by: Joanna Priestley and Dennis Wiancko
- Production company: Priestley Motion Pictures (1990)
- Distributed by: Microcinema International (2005)
- Release date: April 24, 1990
- Running time: 5 minutes
- Country: United States
- Language: English

All My Relations is a 5-minute short animated film from 1990, directed by Joanna Priestley and made from drawings on paper with 3-D frames.

== Summary ==
It satirizes the pitfalls of romance, from marriage, childbirth and upward mobility to the disintegration of a relationship. The animation is framed by a series of sculptural assemblages, which emphasize the message implied by the archetypal characters whose dilemmas may be familiar to those who have bought into the American Dream.

== Awards and recognition ==
- National Independent Film Competition: Grand Prix (USA)
- Black Maria Film and Video Festival: Jury Award for Excellence (NJ, USA)
- Big Muddy Film Festival: Best of Festival (IL, USA)
- American Film and Video Festival: Second Place/Red Ribbon Award (USA)
- Black Maria Film Festival: Jury Award for Excellence (NJ, USA)
- Northwest Film and Video Festival, Portland Art Museum: Honorable Mention (OR, USA)
- Athens International Film Festival: Honorable Mention (OH, USA)
- Marin County Film Festival: Third Prize (CA, USA)
