= Direct manipulation animation =

Stop motion graphic animation technique

Humorous Phases of Funny Faces, an example of directly manipulated animation

Direct manipulation animation is one of the many forms of stop motion, but certainly blurring the distinction between stop motion and regular flat (drawing or "cel") animation.

Direct manipulation is a simplified variation of graphic animation which involves the frame-by-frame altering (erasing or adding to) a single drawing or graphic image, while taking a frame of film or video as each small change is made, as close as the stop motion process gets to simply animating a series of drawings, but without actually changing to completely separate drawings or graphics for each frame of film, a more traditional process that most people associate with the generic "animation' term.

Examples of direct-manipulation-animation are parts of J. Stuart Blackton's 1906 Humorous Phases of Funny Faces, the chalk animation opening sequence of Will Vinton's Dinosaur (1980), and parts of Mike Jittlov's 1977 short film, Animato.

== See also ==
- 12 basic principles of animation
