= Joan C. Gratz =

American artist, animator, and filmmaker (born 1941)

- Born: 1941 (age 84–85); Burbank, California
- Occupations: Artist, Animator, Film director, Producer
- Known for: Animation pioneer with technique in claypainting

Joan Carol Gratz (born 1941) is an American artist, animator, and filmmaker who specializes in clay painting. Gratz is best known for her 1992 Oscar-winning animated short film Mona Lisa Descending a Staircase.

== Early life and education ==
In 1941, Gratz was born in Burbank, California. while Gratz was a student in architecture, she began painting. Gratz was filming her painting process. In 1969, She obtained a degree in professional architecture at the University of California, Los Angeles. Before graduating, Gratz began to experiment with the possibilities of animation and started to explore the idea of "making paintings breathe" with a technique she explained as "clay painting". After graduating, she moved to Oregon, making a living by creating puppets and poster graphics.

== Career ==
In 1976, Gratz was asked to work for Will Vinton in the new up and coming Will Vinton Studios, and began working in the film industry during the production of Rip Van Winkle (1978). During her time at Vinton Studios, Gratz worked on many films as an animator, but in 1987 she decided to work as a freelance animator and filmmaker due to issues involved with collaborative film projects, and not receiving the proper credit for her work. In 1987, Gratz established Gratzfilm, her own studio to direct and produce her films.

Once a freelance animator and filmmaker, Gratz continued to be represented by Vinton Studio, and her success led her to receive commissions for commercials from large companies such as Coca-Cola. In 1990, Gratz animated a commercial for United Airlines entitled Natural, which consisted of her clay painting technique.

After eight years of planning and researching, and two years of working through the creation and animation process, Gratz completed her film Mona Lisa Descending a Staircase in 1992. The title of this seven minute long film combines the titles of Leonardo DaVinci's famous painting, the Mona Lisa (1503), and Marcel Duchamp's iconic modernist piece, Nude Descending a Staircase, No. 2 (1919). Consisting of fifty-five twentieth-century paintings, Gratz uses her clay painting technique to present her audience with the history and evolution of modern art, beginning with Impressionism, and continuing until the Pop Art movement and Hyperrealism through metamorphic transitions between each work of art. The sound and music for the film were provided by composer Jamie Haggerty and Chel White. It won the 1992 Academy Award for Best Animated Short Film, and won many other awards at various film festivals around the world.

In 1993, Gratz co-directed and animated Pro and Con with Joanne Priestly. Using mixed media including writing and calligraphy, and creating through black clay on white backgrounds, Pro and Con illustrates a docudrama about prison life seen through the eyes of a prisoner and a corrections officer.

Gratz is also an author. In June 2014, Gratz was a writer and illustrator of My Tesla: A love story of a mouse and her car, a disguised children book for adults.

Joan C. Gratz is featured as one of six interviewees in Martin Cooper's feature documentary History, Mystery & Odyssey: The Lives and Work of Six Portland Animators (2023). The other interviewees are Joanna Priestley, Chel White, Jim Blashfield, Rose Bond and Zak Margolis. The film premiered at the 2023 Ottawa International Animation Festival.

== Accolades ==
At the Academy Awards, Mona Lisa Descending a Staircase (1992) won an Oscar for the Best Animated Short Film in 1993.

== Filmography ==
=== Director and producer ===
- 1988 Candyjam Co-Director with Joanna Priestley
- 1992 Mona Lisa Descending a Staircase - Director
- 1993 Pro and Con Co-director with Joanna Priestley
- 2010 Kubla Kan
- 2014 Lost and Found
- 2016 Primal Flux - Director
- 2020 No Leaders Please - Director

=== As animator ===
- Rip Van Winkle (1978)
- Legacy: A Very Short History of Natural Resources (1979)
- The Little Prince (1979)
- Dinosaur (1980)
- A Christmas Gift (1980)
- The Creation (1981)
- Candyjam (1988)
- Kubla Kan (2010)
- Lost and Found (2014)
- No Leaders Please (2020)

=== Commercials ===
- Microsoft Windows 95 (1995)

== See also ==
- Clay painting
- Loving Vincent
- Will Vinton
