= Mona Lisa Descending a Staircase =

1992 film by Joan C. Gratz

- Directed by: Joan C. Gratz
- Produced by: Joan C. Gratz
- Starring: Jean G. Poulot
- Music by: Jamie Haggerty, Chel White
- Production company: Joan C. Gratz Productions
- Distributed by: Pyramid Films
- Release date: 1992
- Running time: 7 minutes
- Country: United States
- Language: English

Mona Lisa Descending a Staircase is a 1992 American animated short by Joan C. Gratz.

== Summary ==
Consisting of 2-D "clay painting," it features famous paintings morphing into each other.

== List of artists featured ==
The works of several artists are featured in the transition:

- Vincent van Gogh
- Chuck Close
- Pablo Picasso
- Roy Lichtenstein
- Andy Warhol
- Paul Gauguin
- Marcel Duchamp
- René Magritte
- Philip Guston
- Edvard Munch
- Henri Matisse
- André Derain
- Ernst Ludwig Kirchner
- Modigliani
- Francis Bacon (artist)
- Georg Grosz
- Lucian Freud
- Frida Kahlo
- Robert Rauschenberg
- James Rosenquist
- Tom Wesselmann
- Mark Rothko
- Max Ernst

== Accolades ==
It won the 1992 Oscar for Best Animated Short Film.

== Reception ==
New York Magazine's Vulture named the film ninth best of all 87 Oscar winning animated short films.

== Availability ==
It was released on DVD by Hen's Tooth in 2004 alongside her other works.

It was also available for streaming.
