= Herbert Klynn =

American film producer

- Born: Herbert David Klynn; November 11, 1917; Cleveland, Ohio; United States
- Died: February 3, 1999 (aged 81); Tarzana, California; USA
- Occupations: Animator, painter
- Spouse: Selma Klynn

Herbert David Klynn (November 11, 1917 – February 3, 1999) was an American animator at UPA from 1944 to 1959 eventually rising to the role of Vice President and Production Chief. He worked on various Mr. Magoo cartoons and Gerald McBoing-Boing cartoons as well as cartoon shorts such as Madeline (1952) and Christopher Crumpet (1953).

In 1959 he founded the television animation studio Format Films, best known for producing The Alvin Show and The Lone Ranger, as well as eleven Road Runner cartoons and three Daffy Duck and Speedy Gonzales cartoons for Warner Bros.'s Looney Tunes and Merrie Melodies series.

Format Productions also created title sequences for several TV series, including I Spy, Honey West, the animated characters on the television variety show Hee Haw, animated various TV commercials, and created film title designs for The Glory Guys and Clambake.

Klynn worked on various projects with author Ted Geisel (Dr. Seuss), and also worked with Academy Award-winning designer Saul Bass. He worked alongside sci-fi writer Ray Bradbury in creating the Oscar-nominated "Icarus Montgolfier Wright," an animated story of the first human travel to the Moon.

Herb Klynn co-created the short lived sitcom The Duck Factory, which was the first leading role for Jim Carrey in 1984.

A longtime member of the Academy of Motion Picture Arts and Sciences, Klynn donated his considerable film and TV archive to the USC School of Cinema-Television and to the Museum of Television and Radio Broadcasting in Beverly Hills and New York. He also proposed the original idea of the Student Academy Awards which has been held since 1973.

Klynn received the Winsor McCay Award in 1991; one of the highest honors given to an individual in the animation industry in recognition for career contributions to the art of animation.

The Format Films archives are at the University of Wyoming.
