= Jules Engel =

American filmmaker and animator (1909–2003)

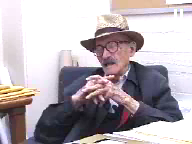
- Born: March 11, 1909; Budapest, Austria-Hungary (present-day Hungary)
- Died: September 6, 2003 (aged 94); Simi Valley, California, U.S.
- Education: Chouinard Art Institute
- Occupations: Filmmaker; painter; sculptor; graphic artist; set designer; animator; teacher
- Years active: 1930–1987

Jules Engel (Hungarian: Engel Gyula; March 11, 1909 – September 6, 2003) was an American filmmaker, painter, sculptor, graphic artist, set designer, animator and teacher of Hungarian origin. He was the founding director of the experimental animation program at the California Institute of the Arts, where he taught until his death, serving as mentor to several generations of animators.

== Early life ==
Engel was born in Budapest, Austria-Hungary, and immigrated to Chicago when he was thirteen years old. He lived in Oak Park, Illinois, adjacent to Chicago, and attended Evanston Township High School, where he began developing his drawing style.

At the age of 17, Engel moved to Los Angeles seeking an athletic scholarship to either USC or UCLA. He lived in Hollywood while attending the Chouinard Art Institute and started to draw for magazines. He worked in the studio of a local painter sketching landscapes, Ken Strobel. Through his relationship with Strobel, he was referred to work as a background artists and as an inbetweening animator in Mintz Studio, the studio founded by Charles Mintz and his wife Margaret J. Winkler, which later became known as Screen Gems.

== Career ==
=== 1938–1941: Disney period ===
In 1938, painter and art teacher Phil Dike helped him get an opportunity to work at Walt Disney Studios in Burbank.

Fantasia

At Disney Engel worked in the film Fantasia, released in 1940. At the time, Disney intended to integrate "low" art (animation) and "high" art (classical music), and the studio needed someone who was familiar with the timing of dance. Because of his drawing talent and his growing knowledge of dance, Engel was assigned to work on the choreography of the Russian sprites and Chinese mushrooms dance sequences of Tchaikovsky's Nutcracker Suite, animated by Art Babbitt. For these sequences, Engel emphasized the contrast between the bright figures and dark ground, which critics consider as an important development of modern animation away from naturalism.

Bambi

David Hand, director of Bambi, asked Engel to work with him on the film. Engel did the storyboard for the sequence where Bambi first encounters the doe Faline. After completing the sequence, he did color sketches that diverged from the naturalistic color schemes being used in production.

Engel's time at Disney would come to an end with the development of the Disney animators' strike. While the union won the case over the studio, Engel didn't go back, largely because, while he enjoyed the place, he felt uncomfortable being surrounded by colleagues who he felt did not share his passion for the aesthetics of animation.

=== 1942–1944: Motion Picture Unit ===
He was an animator in the First Motion Picture Unit during World War II, alongside the likes of Ronald Reagan, and Theodor Geisel (Dr. Seuss). Originally, Engel was waiting to be drafted in the U.S. Army, but was rejected because of his poor eyesight (indicated by his glasses), and a bad shoulder. The Air Force eventually recruited Engel for the Motion Picture Unit to work on training videos and war bond advertisements, at the Hal Roach Studios in Culver City. He would eventually work on drawing aerial maps and instructions for weapons.

=== 1944–1959: UPA days ===
Engel was one of a group of animators—including John Hubley, and Herbert Klynn—who left Disney to join the United Productions of America (UPA) studio. At UPA, Engel worked as a background artist on cartoons including the Oscar-winning Gerald McBoing Boing, Madeline, and Mr. Magoo, becoming art director in 1950.

The environment at UPA was much more open to experimentation, unlike at Disney. Engel brought to UPA his distinctive use of color, influenced by abstract painting and the work of Kandinsky, Klee, Miró, Matisse, Dufy, as well of the Bauhaus book Language of Vision. Engel would later claim responsibility for discovering the children's book Madeline, and suggesting to Stephen Bosustow to buy, copyright, and develop the series.

=== 1959–1963: Format films ===
Together with Herbert Klynn and Buddy Getzler, former colleagues from UPA, Engel founded the television animation studio Format Films. It produced episodes of popular TV series such as The Alvin Show and Popeye the Sailor. The film Icarus Montgolfier Wright, scripted by Ray Bradbury, was nominated for the Academy Award for Best Animated Short Film in 1962.

Klynn closed the studio in 1963 when Engels left for Europe, but reopened it by 1965 as Format Productions.

=== 1963–1967: Paris ===
In 1963, Engel went to Paris to direct The World of Siné, an animated cartoon of the work of Siné and which received the La Belle Qualité Award. The World of Sine was purchased and released throughout Europe by Jacques Tati. In 1964, Engel designed the set for The Little Prince, using abstract sculptural forms on stage. This was a theatre production in Paris for produced and directed by Raymond Gérôme which combined animation by Engel with a live performance on stage. Engel was also set designer for Le Jouex, an avant garde play starring Michelle Boucett. During his stay in Paris, he was friendly with other artists, including Man Ray.

After moving to the village of Coaraze, in the Provence-Alpes-Côte d'Azur, he directed an experimental live-action, partially animated film also called Coaraze, which won the Prix Jean Vigo in 1965. In the late 1960s he began making his own personal fine art animation. He also made several documentaries on other artists.

=== Teaching career and CalArts ===
Back in the U.S., Engel continued working on films about artists, directing A Look at a Lithographer and American Sculpture of the Sixties for Tamarind Lithography Workshop, and a film about the Swiss artist Max Bill.

In 1969, Engel became the Founding Director of CalArts' Animation Program; subsequently becoming the Founding Director of the Experimental Animation Department in the School of Film and Video. Engel's department became known for its animation teaching. CalArts, located Valencia, is the first higher education institution in America to offer a formal degree in animation.

In 1973, Engel self-published a collection of typographic art, entitled 'Oh'.

During the 23rd Annual Annie Awards, in 1995, he received the Winsor McCay Award for his lifetime contributions to the field of animation. He was also recipient of five Golden Eagle awards, the Fritz Award, the Norman McLaren Heritage Award, and the Pulcinella Award for Career Achievement.

== Death ==
Engel died of natural causes on September 6, 2003, in Simi Valley, California, at the age of 94.

=== Legacy ===
In one of his final acts, in May 2003, Engel established the Jules Engel Endowed Scholarship Fund. The fund supports CalArts students in the character and experimental animation programs.

Engel was also a painter and produced a prolific body of oil abstract paintings, lithographs and other graphic artworks. During the late Forties and early Fifties his works were exhibited at the Art Institute of Chicago, the Metropolitan Museum of Art, and the De Young Museum, and throughout his life he exhibited in more than sixty museums and galleries such as the Whitney Museum of American Art, the Los Angeles County Museum of Art, the Pennsylvania Academy of Fine Arts, and the Walker Art Center. He was still working on a new series of lithographs just before his death.

Many of his students carried out his influence through their work, including John Lasseter, Henry Selick, Tim Burton, Stephen Hillenburg, Jorge Gutierrez, Craig McCracken, Joanna Priestley, Christine Panushka, Peter Chung, Glen Keane, Ellen Woodbury, Eric Darnell, Mark Osborne, Steven Subotnick, Patrice Stellest, and Mark Kirkland.

The Engel Animation Advancement Research Center (EAARC) offers a slate of animated shorts drawn from leading international festivals. The program is structured around the themes of personal struggle and forbidden desire in the context of a polarized, conflicted world.

In 2003, the Center for Visual Music, Los Angeles (CVM) and Cal Arts presented a major retrospective of Engel's films at Cal Arts' REDCAT Theatre. Both iotaCenter and CVM have preserved a number of Engel's films; CVM established the Jules Engel Preservation Project shortly after Jules' death. Engel's 1976 film Shapes and Gestures was preserved by the Academy Film Archive in 2001.

The SpongeBob SquarePants Movie, co-written, co-produced, and directed by Stephen Hillenburg (one of Engel's students), is dedicated to him.
