= Art Institute of Portland =

Former for-profit art school as part of The Art Institutes

Coordinates: 45.52402°N 122.68266°W

The Art Institute of Portland
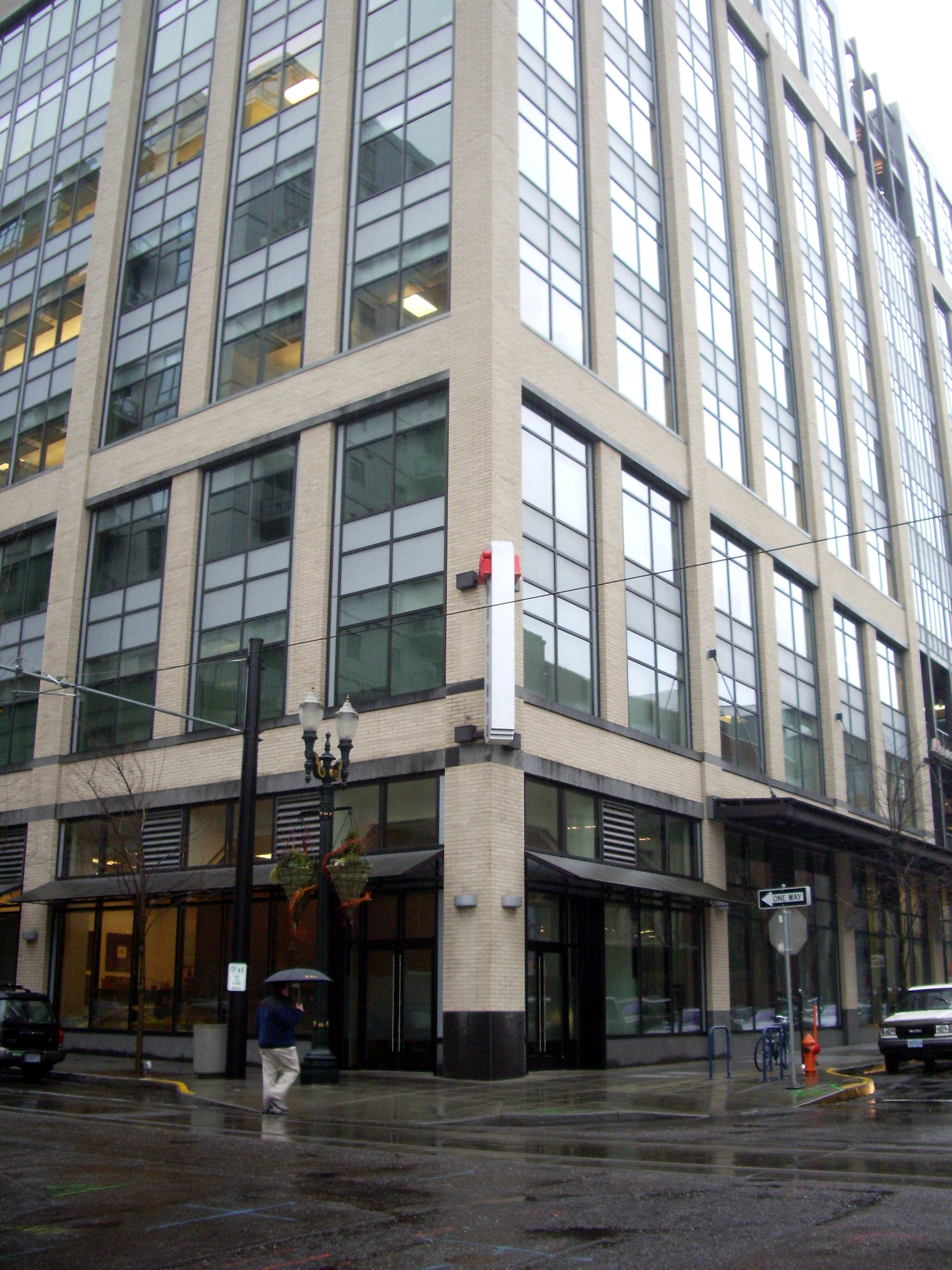
- Former name: Bassist College
- Type: For profit institution
- Active: 1963–2018
- Parent institution: Dream Center Education Holdings LLC
- Location: Portland, Oregon, 97209, United States
- Website: www.artinstitutes.edu/portland

The Art Institute of Portland was a for-profit art school in Portland, Oregon, which briefly operated as a non-profit institution before it closed in 2018. The school was one of a number of Art Institutes, a franchise of for-profit art colleges with many branches in North America, owned and operated by Education Management Corporation. EDMC owned the college from 1998 until 2017, when, facing significant financial problems and declining enrollment, the company sold the Art Institute of Portland, along with 30 other Art Institute schools, to Dream Center Education, a Los Angeles–based Pentecostal organization. Dream Center permanently closed 18 Art Institute schools, including the Art Institute of Portland, at the end of 2018.

== Campus ==
Located in Portland's Pearl District, the school had two computer labs, multiple animation and video labs, a recording studio, library, and a public art gallery. The Marcia Policar Gallery at The Art Institute of Portland displayed both student work and work of local artists and designers.

== History ==
The school was formerly named Bassist College and was acquired by Education Management Corporation (EDMC) in 1998. Bassist College was founded in 1963 by Norma and Donald Bassist as a fashion institute for women.

A required course schedule of four full-time (15 credit hours, or five course) quarters, including summer term, makes it possible to complete a four-year degree in three years.

The school is accredited by the Northwest Commission of Colleges and Universities (NWCCU). Accreditation of an institution of higher education by the Northwest Commission on Colleges and Universities indicates that the institution meets or exceeds criteria for the assessment of institutional quality evaluated through a peer review process.

On March 3, 2017, EDMC announced the execution of a definitive agreement for the sale of substantially all the assets of EDMC and its schools to Dream Center Foundation (DCF), a not-for-profit foundation. The sale was completed on October 17, 2017.

On July 2, 2018, the staff and faculty of the Art Institute of Portland were informed that the school would close on December 31, 2018.
