= Bent Image Lab =

American animation studio and production company

- Type: Private
- Industry: Animation
- Founded: 2001
- Founders: David Daniels; Ray Di Carlo; Chel White
- Headquarters: Portland, Oregon, United States
- Key people: David Daniels (chairman); Ray Di Carlo (co-CEO); Chel White (co-CEO)
- Products: Visual effects
- Owners: David Daniels; Ray Di Carlo; Chel White
- Website: Official website

Bent Image Lab (stylized as BENT IMAGE LAB) is an American animation studio and production company specializing in story development, television, commercials, visual effects, music videos, short films, experimental techniques and tech development in augmented reality (AR). Located in Portland, Oregon, the company was founded in 2001 by partners David Daniels, Ray Di Carlo, and Chel White.

Beginning in 2010, the studio began the production and development of television projects, including half hour animated holiday specials for the Hallmark Channel and animated segments for Portlandia. The company is also known for its visual effects work in motion pictures and television, as seen in Gus Van Sant's Paranoid Park, Restless and Milk, in Todd Haynes' I'm Not There, as well as NBC's Grimm (TV Series). Since 2014, the studio has been developing augmented reality (AR) technology and plans to launch their convergent computer vision library in fall of 2019.

== Work and techniques ==
Bent Image Lab is known largely for its stop motion animation, CGI/computer animation, character design, and multi-technique projects.

Bent's multi-technique approach can be seen in the Modest Mouse music video Whale Song (director Nando Costa), the Thom Yorke music video Harrowdown Hill (director Chel White), the Coca-Cola ad Hidden Formula, the Lux soap ad Provocateur, a commercial for Kellogg's Rice Krispies

One early and notable example of a BENT stop motion project is Blue Christmas (a.k.a. Santa and the States) (season 30, episode 8), a parody short for Robert Smigel's Saturday TV Funhouse on Saturday Night Live. The short, airing December 18, 2004, was directed by Bent co-founder Chel White, written by Robert Smigel and Michelle Saks Smigel with additional material by Rich Blomquist, Stephen Colbert, Scott Jacobson, and Matt O'Brien; voices by Maya Rudolph, Amy Poehler, Erik Bergmann, and Robert Smigel. The short is a parody of the 1964 holiday TV special Rudolph the Red-Nosed Reindeer. Bent Image Lab has replicated the same style and original characters in television advertisements for AT&T, AFLAC, Bing, and in a series of 2014 holiday promos for CBS commemorating the 50th anniversary of Rudolph the Red-Nosed Reindeer. In 2016, the studio produced a ten-minute remake of Rudolph the Red-Nosed Reindeer as a 4D attraction film for SimEx-Iwerks. Another significant stop motion project is Jingle All the Way (TV special), a holiday special for Hallmark Channel. Other notable BENT stop-motion productions include director Rob Shaw's Rats segments for the IFC show Portlandia, and commercials for Legos, Gatorade, Lux, OfficeMax

BENT's CGI work can be seen in the 2015 Annie Awards nominated Polariffic (director Rob Shaw), as well as in their commercials for Honda, Nike, Coca-Cola, Koodo, Nabisco, Puffs, and the American Lung Association. An example of the studio's hand drawn animation can be seen in the animated sequences of David Oyelowo's feature film, The Water Man (2020).

== Founders and directors ==
Bent Image Lab co-founder and director David Daniels invented an animation technique he termed Strata-cut, a unique form of clay animation in which internally packed "loaves" of clay are animated in thin slices, revealing the movement of the pre-sculpted images within. The technique of strata-cut was first used in Daniels' 1985 short film, Buzz Box, then later in animated segments of the Pee Wee's Playhouse series during the mid-90s, and in the music video for Big Time by Peter Gabriel (1986). In September 2016, Daniels gave a demonstration of his unique Strata-cut technique at the Anthology Film Archives in New York City. Before co-founding Bent Image Lab, David Daniels was a director at the Will Vinton Studios, where he helmed commercial projects for M&M's, Levi's, Fanta and broadcast promos Fox NFL.

Bent co-founder Chel White is an independent director who has been making films since the mid-1980s. His 1991 experimental short film, Choreography for Copy Machine (Photocopy Cha Cha), is widely considered the first film to make use of a technique in which people and objects are animated directly on the glass platen of a photocopy machine. White's other films include the shorts Dirt, Magda and A Painful Glimpse Into My Writing Process (In Less Than 60 Seconds), and the feature film Bucksville. Among White's notable commissioned projects are his 2006 music video Harrowdown Hill for Radiohead lead singer Thom Yorke, which features the first use of the Smallgantics technique, as well as the 2007 short film, Wind, commissioned by Radiohead's creative director Dilly Gent and the climate change awareness group Live Earth. Along with eight other Live Earth commissioned films, Wind made its world premiere in the opening night program of the 2007 Tribeca Film Festival with keynote speaker Al Gore. Since 1999, three of Chel White's short films have screened as part of the Sundance Film Festival

Bent Image Lab co-founder and executive producer Ray Di Carlo got his start in the film industry working on special effects in feature films. His first project was The Abyss (1989), where he came on as Lead Man for Donald Pennington. Di Carlo produced visual effects for I'm Not There, Paranoid Park (2007), and Milk (2008).

Bent director Rob Shaw is known for his innovative music videos and the ability to mix different forms of media such as stop motion animation, CG, live action and 2-dimensional animation. He has directed several animated television shorts for IFC's Portlandia, television specials for Hallmark, and commercial campaigns for Gatorade, Koodo Mobile, and Kellogg's, as well as music videos for They Might Be Giants, At the Drive In and several videos for Aesop Rock (including the song Rings). Shaw's animated short film, The Machine, a modern-day cautionary fable about humans and machines, won Best Animated Short from the 2010 Atlanta Film Festival.

Bent director Solomon Burbridge's work includes short, mature-themed segments for MTV, the Bacon Wars segment on Netflix's Disjointed series, and commercials for Old Navy, Tums, MasterCard, Arrowhead and U.S. Navy. He has been a director at BENT since 2007. His film Phase 5 screened in the 2004 Sundance Film Festival. Using the title Design Lab, Burbridge has often co-directed projects with director/designer Joshua Cox, who joined Bent in 2010. Their commercial clients include Honda, Bogs, Cartoon Network and a film for the Advertising and Design Club of Canada called The No Shit Show. Joshua Cox's short film Proximity was winner of the Animation Award in the 2014 New Orleans Film Festival.

Argentine-born director Carlos Lascano is an accomplished filmmaker known for his short films, music videos, and commercials. His work includes a noteworthy ad for Coca-Cola Spirit of the Euro produced at Bent Image Lab.

Bent Image Lab and/or its directors have won awards from the Clio Awards, The One Club, D&AD, Promax BDA awards, Cannes Lions, Daytime Emmy Awards, and several awards from the Chicago International Television Awards. Two commercials directed by Chel White (OfficeMax Santa's Helper, and Fila Mash) were included in the program The Art and Technique of the American Television Commercial The AICP Show at MoMA and are included in the permanent collection of the Museum of Modern Art in New York. Film festival awards include 'Best Television Program for Adults' from the 2012 Ottawa International Animation Festival for Bent Image Lab director Rob Shaw's Rats (stop-motion segments for the IFC show Portlandia), Best Short Film from the 1998 Stockholm International Film Festival for Chel White's Dirt, Best Animated Short for Rob Shaw's The Machine from the 2010 Atlanta Film Festival, and the Grand Jury Prize for Best Animated Short for White's Magda from the 2004 Florida Film Festival. Chel White's music video Harrowdown Hill for Radiohead's lead singer Thom Yorke won Best Music Video in the 2007 SXSW.

== Visual effects ==
Since 2006, Bent Image Lab has created visual effects for feature films, television and more. The company was in charge of visual effects for film director Gus Van Sant's films Paranoid Park (2007), To Each His Own Cinema (segment: First Kiss)" (2007), Restless, and the Academy Award winning Milk (2008), as well as title effects and animation on director Todd Haynes' film, I'm Not There (2007). Chel White acted as Visual Effects Supervisor on all four Van Sant films. For its first two seasons, Bent produced visual effects for NBC's Grimm (TV Series). In 2006, along with his team and co-founders at Bent Image Lab, Chel White pioneered the Smallgantics technique.

== Selected creative work ==
- Hallmark Channel Jingle & Bell's Christmas Star (2012) (directed by Chel White)
- Ad Council/ 211.org - Guiding Light (2021)
- Planters - Nuttiest Time of the Year (directed by Chel White) (2020)
- BC Dairy Foundation - Must Drink More Milk campaign (web shorts, 2008) (various directors)

== Notable awards and screenings ==
- 2018: A Bent Image Lab retrospective and masterclass (presented by Chel White and Rob Shaw) at the Ottawa International Animation Festival.
- 2015: Promax BDA awards, Art Direction and Design: Program Bumper, Cartoon Network "Over the Garden Wall", directed by Solomon Burbridge.
- 2014: Ottawa Animation Festival, Best Cartoon for Adults, IFC's Portlandia "Rats" segment, directed by Rob Shaw
- 2007: SXSW, Best Music Video, Thom Yorke, Harrowdown Hill, directed by Chel White.
- 2006: The AICP Show at MoMA, Office Max Santa's Helper, included in the program The Art and Technique of the American Television Commercial and in the permanent collection of the Museum of Modern Art in New York. Directed by Chel White.
- 2005: Florida Film Festival, Grand Jury Award for Best Animated Short, Magda, directed by Chel White.
- 2004: Clio Awards, Bronze, Reese's Pieces Center of Attention, directed by David Daniels and Chel White
