= Jingle All the Way (disambiguation) =

Jingle All the Way is a 1996 film starring Arnold Schwarzenegger.

Jingle All the Way may also refer to:

- One of the lyrics of the song "Jingle Bells"
- Jingle All the Way 2, a sequel to the 1996 film
- Jingle All the Way (2011 film), a stop motion animated television special
- Jingle All the Way (Béla Fleck and the Flecktones album)
- Jingle All the Way (Crash Test Dummies album)
- Jingle All the Way (Austrian Death Machine album)
