= Paul Harrod =

American film director

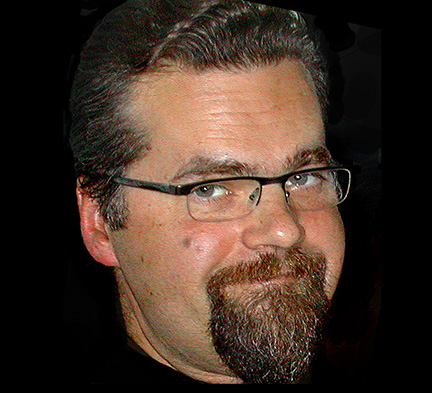
- Photo by Joanna Priestley
- Born: Menlo Park, California, United States
- Education: California Institute of the Arts (BFA 1986); California Institute of the Arts (MFA 1988)
- Known for: Animation director; production designer; art director; film historian
- Spouse: Joanna Priestley
- Website: paulharrod.com

Paul Harrod is an American animation director, production designer, and art director with a special emphasis on stop motion.

== Early life ==
Paul Harrod was born in Menlo Park, California on February 5, 1958, to Lee and Betty Harrod.

== Education ==
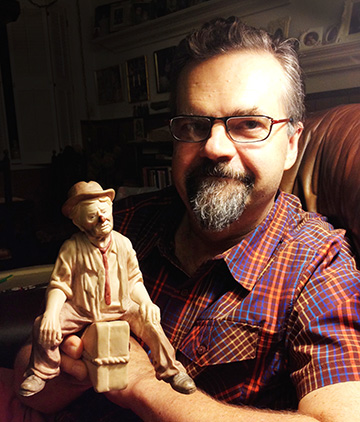
Production designer Paul Harrod with Sad Clown, one of his earliest commercial sculptures.

Paul Harrod attended the California Institute of the Arts, where he received a Bachelor of Fine Arts Degree in 1986 and a Master of Fine Arts Degree in 1988. He was awarded numerous scholarships and was a teaching assistant for Art School Video Production. Harrod was also Chairman of Student Council Film Series and he curated and presented numerous programs of experimental, documentary and narrative cinema.

== Career ==
Shortly after completing his MFA he sculpted an alien make-up for Star Trek V: The Final Frontier and designed and built the sets for the opening title sequence of the 4th and 5th season of Pee Wee's Playhouse (CBS Television) in 1989–90, which won an Emmy Award for Outstanding Graphics and Title Design in 1991. In 1990, he designed and art directed the "pin-screen" animated "All I Want" music video for The Lightning Seeds (MCA Records) which was nominated for a Grammy Award for Best Music Video - Short Form. In 1992 he worked with Lily Tomlin and Jane Wagner designing sets for an animated television special, "Edith Ann: Life in the Little Lane" (Omnipotent Productions). In 1992 Harrod began working with Will Vinton Studios in Portland, Oregon, art directing stop motion commercials including Chips Ahoy, Cool Mint Listerine (Canada), Fanta, "Fanta Si Boy" "Refrigerator Ride" (Latin America), Levis For Women (USA), Kellogg's Pop-Tarts, "Blade Runner" (USA), California Raisins, "What's For Breakfast?" (USA). In 1995, he worked at the Aardman Studio in Bristol, UK where he designed the first Chevron "Talking Car" commercials. In 1995, he taught animation production and design at Volda University College (Volda Norway) for six months, graduating the first animation students in Norway. In 1995 he joined the crew of Tim Burton's "Mars Attacks" at Warner Bros. Studios as stop-motion art director, but left the production shortly before the stop-motion unit was dissolved and the execution of Martian sequences fell to Industrial Light and Magic.

In 1995, Harrod joined Will Vinton Studios in Portland, Oregon full time as Senior Art Director, and shortly thereafter began directing commercials as well. Between 1999 and 2001, he directed five episodes of the television series, "The PJs", for which he received an Annie Award in 2000. He was also the first production designer on the series and he oversaw the production of all the sets and puppets. Harrod went on to direct the first episode of UPN's quirky animated series "Gary and Mike" and he designed and directed the pilot for Warner Brothers' "Slacker Cats," both while employed at Will Vinton Studios. From 2004 to 2014, Harrod directed animated commercials at Bent Image Lab where his clients include Alltel Wireless, Kelloggs' Twistables, Cartoon Network, and Aflac. His spot "Koi Pond," for Tractor Supply Company, was voted one of the 50 best spots of 2006 by Adweek.

Since 2008, Harrod has curated and presented a monthly film screening and lecture at Mother's Velvet Lounge in Portland, Oregon. Themes for the series have included "Italian Westerns", "Film Noir", "Dreams, The Subconscious and the Surreal" and "Women and Power". He frequently travels to film festivals all over the world, where he occasionally presents programs of his commercials and television shows. In 2014 Harrod began his own company, Sticky Films, and directed and designed a sequence for the end credits of 22 Jump Street. He lived to London from 2015 to 2017 when he was the co-production designer with Adam Stockhausen on "Isle of Dogs, a stop motion animated feature directed by Wes Anderson, released in March of 2018. The film received praise for its inventive design with Variety noting "Even the garbage in each frame — of which there is plenty, the film's chief setting being a less-than-salubrious enclave called Trash Island — looks hand-picked by production designers Adam Stockhausen (as essential here as he was to the success of "The Grand Budapest Hotel" and "Moonrise Kingdom") and Paul Harrod."

== Awards/accolades ==
- 2000: Annie nomination for Outstanding Individual Achievement for Production Design in an Animated Television Production "The PJs" episode "Boys In The Wood"
- 2018: Annie nomination for Production Design in an Animated Feature Production "Isle of Dogs"
- 2018 Art Directors Guild Award Winner for Excellence in Production Design for an Animated Film "Isle of Dogs"

== Family life ==
Paul Harrod lives in Portland, Oregon with his wife, filmmaker Joanna Priestley.
