= Gary & Mike =

Television series

- Genre: Animated sitcom
- Created by: Fax Bahr; Adam Small
- Voices of: Harland Williams; Christopher Moynihan; Kurtwood Smith; Bryan Cranston; Kevin Michael Richardson
- Opening theme: "Anywhere But Home" by Bottlefly
- Composer: Greg O'Connor
- Country of origin: United States
- No. of seasons: 1
- No. of episodes: 13

Production
- Executive producers: Fax Bahr; Adam Small; Tom Turpin; Will Vinton
- Producer: Erik Vignau
- Running time: 20–23 mins
- Production companies: Bahr-Small Productions; Will Vinton Studios; Big Ticket Television

Original release
- Network: UPN
- Release: January 12 – April 13, 2001

Gary & Mike is an American adult animated buddy sitcom that aired on UPN in 2001 and Comedy Central in 2003. It was Big Ticket Television's first animated show. The show was produced in stop motion clay animation and lasted only one season. A total of thirteen episodes were produced. The series was initially proposed to Fox, but was eventually passed over to UPN. UPN had aired the episodes out of order, leading to inconsistencies within the plot serialization (save for the production placement of the third and fourth episodes).

In addition to its own musical score by Greg O'Connor and title theme by Bottlefly, the series has had a number of licensed songs that can be heard throughout most of the episodes.

The Sizzle that was initially proposed to Fox was animated by Corky Quakenbush before the series was passed over to Will Vinton Studios. It featured the songs "Girls" by Beastie Boys and "Heroes" by The Wallflowers.

== Plot summary ==
Gary and Mike is about two best friends traveling across the United States on a road trip, accomplishing nothing of importance, and unwittingly destroying hopes, dreams, and personal property. Gary is a fairly normal, albeit high-strung, uptight, good hearted loser while Mike is the fun-loving, laid back, "best friend from hell" with a sex addiction. They meet hookers, mole people, and a scheming murderer, all while a vengeful father pursues Mike for bedding his daughter.

Although the final episode included a "to be continued" message, the show was canceled after its first season. According to co-creator Adam Small, 10 more episodes were planned for the second season. The cancellation was actually a result of the financial issues UPN was facing at the time rather than a ratings issue.

== Cast and characters ==
- Christopher Moynihan as Gary Newton Jr., a nervous man and one of the main protagonists
- Harland Williams as Mike Bonner, Gary's laid-back if destructive childhood best friend and one of the main protagonists
- Bryan Cranston as Sergeant Major Gary Newton Sr., Gary's tough-as-nails father and a former military major
- Kurtwood Smith as Officer Dick, a vengeful cop who hunts down Mike for having sexual relations with his daughter, Julie on her wedding day
- Candi Milo as Julie, Officer Dick's daughter
- Kevin Michael Richardson

== Episodes ==
No.	Title	Directed by	Written by	Original release date
1	"Dawn of the New Millennium"	Robin Ator & Doug Aberle	Fax Bahr & Adam Small	January 12, 2001
The story begins in St. Louis, Missouri, where Gary Newton bids farewell to his nursing home patients as he prepares to embark on a journey following the Lewis and Clark trail. Meanwhile, his friend Mike finds himself in a predicament after being caught in bed with a girl named Julie by her parents. Gary sets off on his trip in his SUV, with Mike unexpectedly joining him to escape Julie's angry father, Officer Dick. Along the way, they encounter a hitchhiker who initially seems helpful but ends up robbing them and stealing their car. After spending a night in the woods and mistakenly eating a little girl's pet rabbit, Gary and Mike are arrested. They explain their ordeal to the police, who eventually verify their story and release them. After being Confronted by an Angry Mob of Evangelicals and Being Rescued by a Group of Satanists, They Find their Wrecked SUV in an Impound Lot. Determined to continue their journey, Gary and Mike use money hidden by Mike to purchase a beat-up 1964 Bel Air. They also buy a replacement rabbit for the girl whose pet they accidentally ate, but the new rabbit meets a similar fate shortly after. Despite the chaotic events, Gary reflects on the trip with a mix of frustration and camaraderie towards Mike, who remains determined to keep exploring rather than face his father's wrath. The episode ends with Gary and Mike driving aimlessly away from home, continuing their unpredictable adventure. Featured Music: "Are You Ready For My Love" by Rockell and "Get Off" by The Dandy Warhols
2	"The Furry Duffel"	David Bleiman & Brad Schiff	Will Gluck	January 12, 2001
On their way through the Bible-Belt in fictional Wenville, Texas, they stop to get some food. They pull in to a Jesus-themed restaurant, aptly named "Baptist Burger", whereupon Gary and the drive-thru clerk become smitten with each other. In hilarious sit-com fashion, he fails every time to notice that she has a growth that covers half her face, but Mike sure does...until Gary goes to her house to meet her. Meanwhile, Mike tries to win a Hotrod in a "hands on the Hotrod" contest. Featured Music: "Loose" by Primer 55 and "Eye of the Tiger" by Survivor
3	"Phish Phry"	Ken Pontac	Howard Gewirtz	January 19, 2001
The duo now find themselves at a Phish concert in Vermont where Gary accidentally swallows 4 hits of acid. When he comes to his senses, he discovers he's married to a 35-year-old hippie woman (voiced by Shannen Doherty) with three kids. Officer Dick also manages to find the duo's car after tracking them for so long and seeks to exact his revenge on Mike, under the cover as a hippie himself. Meanwhile, Mike discovers the secret evil behind the band's unwarranted success. This episode features a strata-cut animation sequence by David Daniels. Featured Music: "Voices" by Disturbed and "This's What It Feels Like" by Beachwood Sparks
4	"Road Rage"	Jim Hardison	Richard Doctorow	January 26, 2001
Gary and Mike go on MTV's Road Rage (a play on Road Rules) and visit Mike's brother, Ben in Santa Fe, New Mexico. Ben gets jealous of Mike because he becomes more popular than him, and Gary meets a new "friend". WWF wrestler Chyna makes a guest appearance and falls in love with Gary's new "friend" at the end of the episode. Officer Dick catches up with Ben, whom he believes is Mike under an assumed identity, and shoots out the tires of his SUV which he won at the end of the Road Rage program. Featured Music: "Gonna Make You Sweat (Everybody Dance Now)" by C+C Music Factory, "I Think I Love You" by David Cassidy, "It's Now or Never" by Elvis Presley, “Wild Thing" by The Troggs and "Who I Am (Chyna)" by WWE, Jim Johnston
5	"Washington D.C."	Gayle Ayres	Barry O'Brien	February 2, 2001
Gary and Mike enter the nation's capital, where they're in desperate need of money...so they hunt down a friend of Mike's mom. Soon, they're working on a campaign for a crusading senator's health care legislation. Gary seems to be helping a great deal, but without knowing it is causing more trouble than the campaign can stand, meanwhile Mike finds himself falling for a much, much older woman who is a Supreme Court Justice. Featured Music: "Hot" by Black Eyed Peas
6	"The Virgin Gary"	Ken Pontac	Michael Kaplan	February 9, 2001
It's Viva Las Vegas for Gary and Mike, when Mike forms a plan to help Gary get rid of his "virginitis" by setting an unknowing Gary up with an escort. Gary thinks the girl really likes him and winds up falling for her hard. Meanwhile Mike is counting cards in the casino owned by the same honked-off mobsters who gave them their hotel room, as his source of income. Featured Music: "Someone Else's Blues" by David Bromberg
7	"New York, New York"	Sean Burns & Ken Pontac	Howard Gewirtz	February 16, 2001
Gary and Mike are in The Big Apple, New York, and their car gets stolen; so they decide to disguise themselves as Jews and go to a bar mitzvah. Some other Jewish people chase them down to the subway. Gary and Mike have an argument and separate, and Gary becomes one of the "Mole People" who live in the sewers while Mike seems to luck out at every turn from being handed $50 by a generous blind man, to getting to model with European supermodels, to bedding with them. Presumably after they reunite and reconcile, they would head to Atlantic City, New Jersey, as mentioned. However, this was not made into an episode. Featured Music: "Baby's Got a New Revelation" by The Exies
8	"Cult Status"	Paul Harrod	Fax Bahr & Adam Small	March 2, 2001
In fictional rural Baylor, Minnesota, as Hasselhoff's comet nears, Gary and Mike meet up with two girls whom turn out to be part of a cult. Gary wants to get out of there quick, but Mike says he's too close to getting some to leave, so Gary reluctantly agrees to stay the night. Soon, Gary is pulled into the cult with his new name: Ga. Hence, it is up to Mike, whose cult name is Huh, to save Gary in time.
9	"Springered"	Doug Aberle	Fax Bahr & Adam Small	March 23, 2001
While making their way to Chicago, Illinois, Gary has the inside of his mouth stung by a bee and is rushed to a hospital. After a close call with death, Gary soon decides he should come clean with his father about his road trip with his buddy Mike and breaks the news to him on a special Father's Day episode of "Jerry". Based on the continuity of this episode, it was likely meant to be placed after "The Virgin Gary".
10	"Shotgun Wedding"	Doug Aberle	Heather MacGillvray & Linda Mathious	March 30, 2001
After traveling from Miami, Florida, to Seattle, Washington, the duo discover Mike's ex-girlfriend, Beth, who has been seen as RazorKat's drummer, is getting married in Miami, prompting Mike to drive all the way back. Mike does not like the guy, whom seems to have everything. Thanks to some books about a John Shaft knock-off, Gerald Stroke, Gary is acting emulous in a Shaft-like manner, and helps Mike figure out what Beth's finance is really about, as Mike attempts to sort out his feelings for her. (This episode is said to take place on June 20th, set 3 days after "Springered", which is set on Father's Day. Likely meaning this was intended to be the 5th episode in the series continuity.
11	"The Scene"	Gayle Ayres	Richard Doctorow	April 6, 2001
In Hollywood, California, the guys attempt to party with the celebrities. They elude an oversexed TV mother and then encounter a strangely compliant person who might be Gwyneth Paltrow. Featured Music: "Et Meme Que Quai!" by Michel Philippe Gentils, "Crazy" by Patsy Cline and "Out of Control" by The Chemical Brothers
12	"Corn Ugly Dog"	Ken Pontac & Doug Aberle	Matthew Berry & Eric Abrams	April 13, 2001
Between Minneapolis and St. Paul, Minnesota, the duo make their way to the Mall of North America (a parody of Mall of America) to spend a large amount of coupons to support themselves for the whole winter...only to discover that the coupons have expired (the coupon book turned out to be sold to Mike by an ex-con who conned Mike into buying it). Through the kindness of a corn dog business owner (played by Stacy Keach), Gary and Mike get a job at Corn Diggity Dog in the Mall. A competitor corn dog company called Porn Dogs is putting Corn Diggity Dog out of business until Gary realizes he can save the business by winning a trick Corn Dog competition. Featured Music: "Hey Song (Rock and Roll Pt. 2)" Hockey Mix by Sports All-Stars
13	"Crisscross"	David Bleiman & Brad Schiff	Drake Sather	April 13, 2001
In San Francisco, California Officer Dick finally manages to catch up with the duo again, and pursues them in a high-speed chase. However, like his last two attempts, his efforts would end in vain. After Dick lands into a gay bar, both of them run over a speed-bump, causing Mike to spill his Slurpee on the Marine Corps flag Gary bought for his dad, as well as his shirt. Mike then prompts Gary to take off his shirt and dry it off in the breeze along with the flag. Little do the two of them know that they are driving in front of a Gay Pride Parade on national television which Mr. Newton sees, and mistakenly assumes that Gary is gay and Mike is his partner. After Gary's dad signs him up for the Marines, he goes to a strip club and meets a mysterious stranger, Jared, (voiced by Tim Curry) who tells him he will kill Gary's dad; if Gary kills the stranger's wife. After the wife dies accidentally, Gary must race to save his father's life. However upon stopping Jared, he tells the police Gary killed his wife and then him (after Gary accidentally makes Jared get a lethal injection). They are then chased by the Police themselves and are cornered at an incomplete highway. Gary in turn, feeling trapped by his dad with nowhere to go but down, then tells Mike to make the suicidal jump. The episode ends with a fade to white with the caption "To Be Continued..." According to co-creator Adam Small, the duo was scripted to survive by landing in the water or something else. 10 more episodes were planned and fully developed for a second season but never saw production on account of the circumstances surrounding the show's cancellation. Featured Music: "I Will Survive" by Gloria Gaynor

== Awards ==
The show won two Emmy awards for Outstanding Individual Achievement in Animation. It was also nominated in the category for Outstanding Music & Lyrics. Gary and Mike was also nominated by the Casting Society of America for Best Casting for Animated Voiceover-Television.
