= Rob Shaw (filmmaker) =

American filmmaker

Rob Shaw is an American film director, television director, commercial and music video director, and animator. He is a graduate of University of the Arts (Philadelphia).

== Career ==
In 2006, Rob Shaw joined the animation studio Bent Image Lab, Portland, Oregon, where he began directing commercials, music videos, internet projects, and eventually long and short form television.

In 2007, he directed the music video for the song "I'm Impressed", the debut single from the album The Else by the band They Might Be Giants. The video won a Gold Plaque at the 2008 Chicago International Film Festival (Television Section, Hugo Awards).

In 2008, Shaw directed a second music video for They Might Be Giants for the song "Computer Assisted Design" from the album Here Comes Science. Also in 2008, Shaw was principal director on a series of Bessie Award winning internet shorts for the British Columbia Dairy Association's campaign "Must Drink More Milk".

In 2012, Shaw created the animation "Noon Moons for the Experimental Sound Studio", with a soundtrack by Terri Kapsalis and The Eternals.

In 2014, Shaw directed Polariffic, an animated children's television special produced for Hallmark Channel by Bent Image Lab.

In 2018, Rob Shaw joined Bent Image Lab co-founder Chel White for retrospective and masterclass at the Ottawa International Animation Festival.

== Awards ==
The Machine – A modern-day cautionary fable about humans and machines. Won Best Animated Short from the 2010 Atlanta Film Festival. The film made its world premiere in the 2009 Anima Mundi festival in Brazil.

Portlandia – "Rats" stop-motion segments for Independent Film Channel – won Best Television Program for Adults at the 2012 Ottawa International Animation Festival.

Polariffic – Hallmark Channel animated children's television special nominated for a 2015 Annie Award for Best Animated Special.

== Commercial clients ==
Rob Shaw's commercial clients include Koodo ("El Tabador" 5-year campaign), Gatorade, Hasbro, Cadbury, Alltel, Zune, Guitar Hero, and Kellogg's.

== Filmography ==
=== Television ===
- Polariffic (2014)
- Portlandia (TV series) "Rats" stop-motion segments for Independent Film Channel (IFC) (2011–2013)
- hoops&yoyo's Haunted Halloween (2012)
- Short films
- The Machine (2010)

=== Videography ===
- Aesop Rock – "Long Legged Larry" (2021)
- Aesop Rock – "Gates" (2020)
- Malibu Ken – "Corn Maze" (2018)
- At The Drive-In – "Incurably Innocent" (2017)
- At The Drive-In – "Governed By Contagions" (2016)
- Aesop Rock – "Rings" (2016)
- The Uncluded – "Organs" (2013)
- The Uncluded – "Aquarium" (2013)
- They Might Be Giants – "Computer Aided Design" (2008)
- They Might Be Giants – "I'm Impressed" (2007)
- The Apparitions – "God Monkey Robot" (2006)

== See also ==
- Ladislas Starevich
- Jan Švankmajer
- Aesop Rock
- Portlandia (TV series)
