= David Daniels (filmmaker) =

American film director

David Daniels is an American commercial director, filmmaker, and co-founder (along with Ray Di Carlo and Chel White) of the Portland, Oregon based animation studio Bent Image Lab.

== History ==
Early in his career, Daniels animated parts of Pee-wee's Playhouse, and sections of Peter Gabriel's music video "Big Time." David later directed the original twelve M&M's spots.

== Stratacut ==
David Daniels used a technique called strata-cut animation, a form of clay animation in which internally packed "loaves" of clay are animated in thin slices, revealing the movement of the pre-sculpted images within. Daniels first used the technique of strata-cut in his 1985 film, Buzz Box.

== At Bent Image Lab ==
In 2008, David Daniels and Bent co-founder Ray Di Carlo co-directed "Hidden Formula".

== Screenings ==
Daniels' experimental animated film, "Buzz Box Remix" premiered at the 2007 International Film Festival Rotterdam.. In 2017, David Daniels gave a one-man show at the historic Anthology Film Archives in New York City.
