= Joe Frank =

Writer and radio performer (1938–2018)

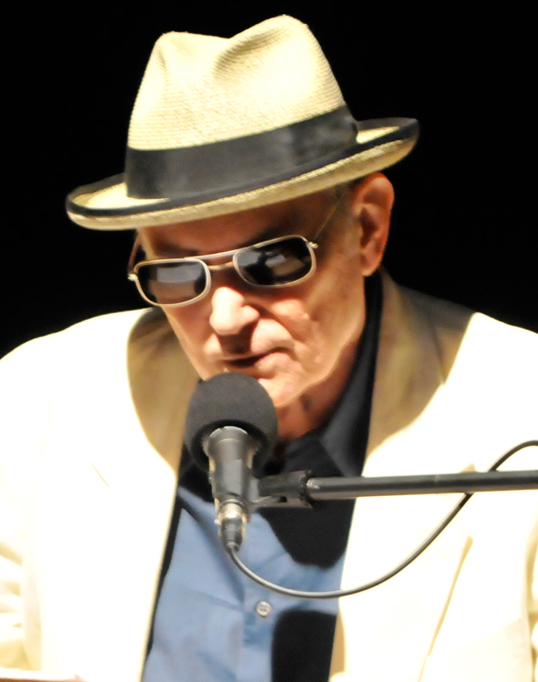
- Frank at Steppenwolf Theatre Company in 2010
- Born: Joseph Langermann; August 19, 1938; Strasbourg, France
- Died: January 15, 2018 (aged 79); Beverly Hills, California, United States
- Years active: 1978–2017
- Spouse: Michal Story
- Presenting career
- Show: "NPR Playhouse," "Work In Progress," "In the Dark," "Somewhere out There," "The Other Side" "Unfictional - KCRW"
- Stations: NPR, KCRW, WESS, WAYO, WCFA, KNVC, KZGM, WDBX, WRUU, KZSR, KDVS, KYBU,
- Country: United States
- Website: joefrank.com

Joe Frank (né Joseph Langermann; August 19, 1938 – January 15, 2018) was an American writer, teacher, and radio performer best known for the monologues and radio dramas broadcast on radio stations in New York City and in Southern California. His pieces were often philosophical, humorous, surrealist, and sometimes absurd, frequently in collaboration with friends, actors, and family members.

== Early life ==
Frank was born Joseph Langermann in Strasbourg, France, near the border of Germany, to Meier Langermann (then aged 51, a Polish-born shoe manufacturer) and Friederike "Fritzi" Langermann (née Passweg), then aged 26. After his father left Germany for NYC, he arranged for Frank, 3 months old, his mother and nanny to leave Nazi Germany on November 9, 1938 (Kristallnacht). Legislation to allow the family and others into the country was passed by the US Congress twice, the first having been vetoed by President Franklin Delano Roosevelt.

His father (identified as 'Meyer Langerman' in New York City's death records) died of kidney failure on October 8, 1943, when Joe was five years old.

On April 28, 1945, his mother married Theodore Frank (whom Joe called Freddy in his show, and in the article "Joe Frank is Off the Air" in the LA Weekly in 1997) and changed Joe's last name.

In his twenties, Frank studied at Hofstra University in New York and later at the Iowa Writers' Workshop. In 1964, he taught five grades of English at the Sands Point Academy for Gifted Children in Sands Point, New York. Among his students were Gary Lambert, host on SiriusXM's The Grateful Dead Channel, and novelist/screenwriter Howard A. Rodman. For 10 years ending in 1974, he taught English and Russian literature and existentialism at the Dalton School in Manhattan. Later, he worked as a music promoter (1976–77), a job that involved long-distance driving, during which he became absorbed with listening to the car radio.

== NPR, 1978-1984 ==
In 1977, Frank began volunteering at Pacifica Network station WBAI in New York, performing experimental radio involving monologues, improvisational actors, and live music during late-night, free-form hours. The following year, he moved to Washington, D.C. to serve as a co-anchor for the weekend edition of National Public Radio's All Things Considered, his first paying radio job; the gig lasted two weeks. At the end of each segment, Frank was allotted five minutes to narrate one of his creative fictional essays.

During 1978–84, Frank performed in and produced 18 dramas for NPR Playhouse, winning several awards.

== KCRW, 1985–2018 ==
For a test period at NPR's Santa Monica, California, affiliate station, KCRW, Joe appeared live, introducing shows he'd produced previously for NPR; the short series was called "Joe Frank at Midnight," Then, in 1986, Ruth Hirschman Seymour, the general manager of KCRW, offered Frank a weekly time slot; he then moved to Santa Monica, California, where he wrote, produced, and performed hour-long radio programs, for a series called Joe Frank: Work In Progress.

Frank continued to work at KCRW until 2002, and his work evolved, as evidenced by the diverse series he produced. The first was "Work in Progress," then "In The Dark," followed by "Somewhere out There", and finally "The Other Side".

Beginning in 2004, Frank began creating full-length shows for subscribers to his web site. In 2012, Frank started producing periodic half-hour shows for KCRW's "UnFictional" series. He continued to produce all-new shows for the series until months before his death.

== Other activities and personal life ==
Starting in 2003, Frank performed on stage with original material at South Coast Repertory in Costa Mesa, California, the Art Institute of Chicago and the Steppenwolf Theatre in Chicago, Illinois; at the Great American Music Hall in San Francisco; and in Los Angeles at the Hammer Museum and Largo at the Coronet, as well as other venues.

His 230-hour body of work continues to be re-aired on many NPR stations including the radio station at the University of California at Davis (KDVS), Savannah, Georgia (WRUU), Cabool, Missouri (KZGM), Carson City, Nevada (KNVC), Cape May, New Jersey (WCFA), and others with new stations being added.

In early 2005, Frank suffered complete kidney failure. He received the kidney of his first cousin, once removed, in 2006, which continued to function normally (with the help of multiple immunosuppressant drugs) until his death.

In 2012, Frank returned to KCRW for episodes of the station's "UnFictional" program.

In May 2014, Frank had surgery to treat colon cancer, which was successful. In December 2015, Frank was hospitalized due to a gastrointestinal perforation following a routine medical procedure. This led to heart and kidney issues and Frank's complete recovery took a full year. His colon cancer returned in July 2017; he had surgery in October 2017 to excise a tumor in his colon. He died on January 15, 2018, after multiple reversals following the surgery, from sepsis.

== Radio program style ==
Frank's radio programs are often dark and ironic and employ a dry sense of humor and the sincere delivery of ideas or stories that are patently absurd. Subject matter often includes religion, life's meaning, death, family dynamics, and Frank's relationships with women.

Frank's voice is distinctive, resonant, and authoritative. Due to Frank's occasional voice-over work, his voice was often oddly familiar to listeners. At the 2003 Third Coast Festival, he explained he was recording in Dolby and playing back without it, which created Joe's now-familiar intimate and gritty sound. A 1987 Los Angeles Times article described it as a voice "like dirty honey" and "rich as chocolate".

The repetitive cadence of the music, drones and Frank's dry, announcer-like delivery are sometimes mixed with recorded phone calls with actor/friends such as Larry Block, Debi Mae West and Arthur Miller (not the playwright), broken into segments over the course of each hour-long program.

Frank's series "The Other Side" included excerpts from Buddhist teacher Jack Kornfield's Dharma talks at Spirit Rock Meditation Center. In an interview on KPFA's "Morning Show", Kornfield was asked about working with Frank. Kornfield explained that, although he had never met or talked to Frank or heard his show, he didn't mind Frank using the lectures and that many of his meditation students had found Kornfield through the show.

== Other work ==
- Joe Frank is credited in the titles of the 1999 cult movie Galaxy Quest as the voice of the on board computer of spaceship The Protector.
- He can be heard on the song "Montok Point" on William Orbit's album Strange Cargo Hinterland.
- He can be heard on the song "Ocean" on Brazzaville's album 2002.
- The Decline of Spengler stage play, New Directions 48, New York City, 1984.
- A Tour of the City stage play (Tanam Press, New York City), produced by Theatre Anima at Hangar #9 in the Old Port, Montreal, Canada, in 1990, directed by Jordan Deitcher.
- The Queen of Puerto Rico and Other Stories. (William Morrow, New York City, 1993). A collection of short stories: Tell me what to do—Fat man—Night—Date—Walter—The queen of Puerto Rico—The decline of Spengler. ISBN 0-688-08765-5
- Four short films for television based on his radio shows were written by Frank, directed by Paul Rachman and produced by Propaganda Films in Los Angeles: "Memories by Joe Frank" in 1992 for CBS Television as a pilot, and "The Hitchhiker", "The Perfect Woman", and "Jilted Lover" in 1993 for the series "Inside Out" on the Playboy cable network.
- Filmmaker Chel White created three short films based on segments from Frank's radio shows, two of which include his voice. The films are Dirt (1998) and Magda (2004) from Frank's show "The Dictator", and "Soulmate" (2000) from "Emerald Isle".
- Short film: "Coma" produced and directed by Todd Downing. Based on the radio show of the same title by Frank.
- Joe Frank: Ascent (Fantagraphics Underground, Seattle, WA, released in 2021). A comic book adaptation of six short stories, illustrated by Jason Novak in collaboration with Frank while he was alive.

== Documentary film ==
A feature-length film, Joe Frank: Somewhere Out There, about Frank's life and work, was released in 2018, less than a month after Frank's death. Frank was given final cut rights and the film was completed with Joe's sign-off in early October 2017. The filmmaker revised the film at least twice after Frank's death - some changes Frank had specifically vetoed prior to completion according to his widow who collaborated and worked on the script with Joe. The documentary includes interviews with collaborators and other personalities.

== Influence and legacy ==
Frank's body of work has inspired a variety of other artists including:

- Ira Glass of radio's "This American Life" worked under Frank as one of his first jobs in public radio, and credits Frank as his greatest inspiration.
- Jad Abumrad a recipient of the MacArthur fellowship most known for being the co-host and producer of WNYC's "Radiolab".
- David Sedaris, writer
- Troy Schulze, a theater artist in Houston, Texas, who created the show "Jerry's World" (2003) for Houston-based theater group Infernal Bridegroom Productions. Utilizing material from several Frank shows, the piece was deemed Best Original Show in Houston in 2011 by the Houston Press.
- Jeff Crouse, artist and technologist, created "Interactive Frank," which uses content from the Web to dynamically create a Joe Frank Show. "The user types in a sentence, and Interactive Frank takes over, scouring the Web for another sentence that follows a sentence with the last three words. Frank can also find streaming audio to accompany the generated narrative based on a word analysis, and it can read the narrative using an online text-to-speech generator."
- Filmmakers such as Francis Ford Coppola, Michael Mann, David Fincher, Ivan Reitman, and Martin Scorsese have optioned or bought stories from Joe Frank's radio shows (although the terms for Scorsese's film After Hours were settled after production had already begun).
- Blue Jam, a late-1990s series made by British comedian Chris Morris broadcast on BBC Radio 1 in the UK, shares parallels with early editions of mid-1980s Work in Progress shows.
- Comedian Dana Gould credits Joe Frank as the inspiration for the format of his podcast, The Dana Gould Hour. After Frank's death he dedicated an episode of the podcast entirely to his work and legacy.
- Jonathan Goldstein, former host of CBC radio's WireTap

== Voice-over and acting work ==
Joe Frank performed voice-overs for commercials including Zima, the Saturn Corporation and Jiffy Lube. He was the voice of the computer in Galaxy Quest and provided voiceovers for:

- Wild Rescues on Animal Planet
- Sexy Beast as the narrator on the trailer, which was nominated for best film trailer voice over in 2002
- W/ Bob & David as the narrator in episodes 1 and 3

He also had a small acting role in The Game.

== Awards ==
- 2003
  - Third Coast International Audio Festival Lifetime Achievement Award

=== During NPR Playhouse ===
- 1982
  - Broadcast Media Award
- 1983
  - Radio Program Award from the Corporation For Public Broadcasting
  - Gold Award from the International Radio Festival of New York
- 1984
  - Gold Award from the International Radio Festival of New York (second)
  - American Nomination to the Prix Italia
- 1985
  - Special Commendation from the Berlin Prix Futura

=== During Work In Progress ===
- 1988
  - Major Armstrong Award
  - Corporation For Public Broadcasting Program Award
- 1991
  - Peabody Award
- 1993
  - Guggenheim Fellowship for Radio Art
