= Polariffic =

- Written by: Allan Neuwirth
- Directed by: Rob Shaw
- Starring: Gregory Robert (as Charlie), Ethan Hu (as Jaz), Holden Goyette (as Snowby), Deja Fitzwater (as Flitter), Kate Harrington (as Cupcake)
- Music by: Charles-Henri Avelange
- Country of origin: United States
- Original language: English

Production
- Producer: Marissa Weisman
- Editor: Brent Heise
- Running time: 5 minutes, 30 seconds
- Production company: Bent Image Lab

Original release
- Release: November 15, 2014

Polariffic (stylized as POLARIFFIC!) is a 2014 American animated children's television special produced by Bent Image Lab for Hallmark Channel, directed by Rob Shaw.

== Information ==
"Polariffic" takes place in the North Pole. Its supposed first episode "Yeti or Not" features a foursome of Arctic friends (namely the Polariffic Pals); Snowby, a gentle polar bear cub, Jaz, a be-bopping emperor penguin, Flitter, a light-on-her-feet Arctic fox and Cupcake, a thoughtful baby harp seal, all of them described as being "the best of friends". This is until one day they encounter Charlie, a young Yeti who tries to befriend them. At first terrified, the four friends find themselves face-to-face with him and must muster the courage to trust him in order to save themselves. At the end, the gang learns appearances aren't always what they seem.

== Accolades ==
List of Awards and Nominations
Year	Award	Category	Recipients and nominees	Results
2014	42nd Annual Annie Awards	Best Animated Special Production	Polariffic	Nominated
