= Magda (2004 film) =

2004 film by Chel White

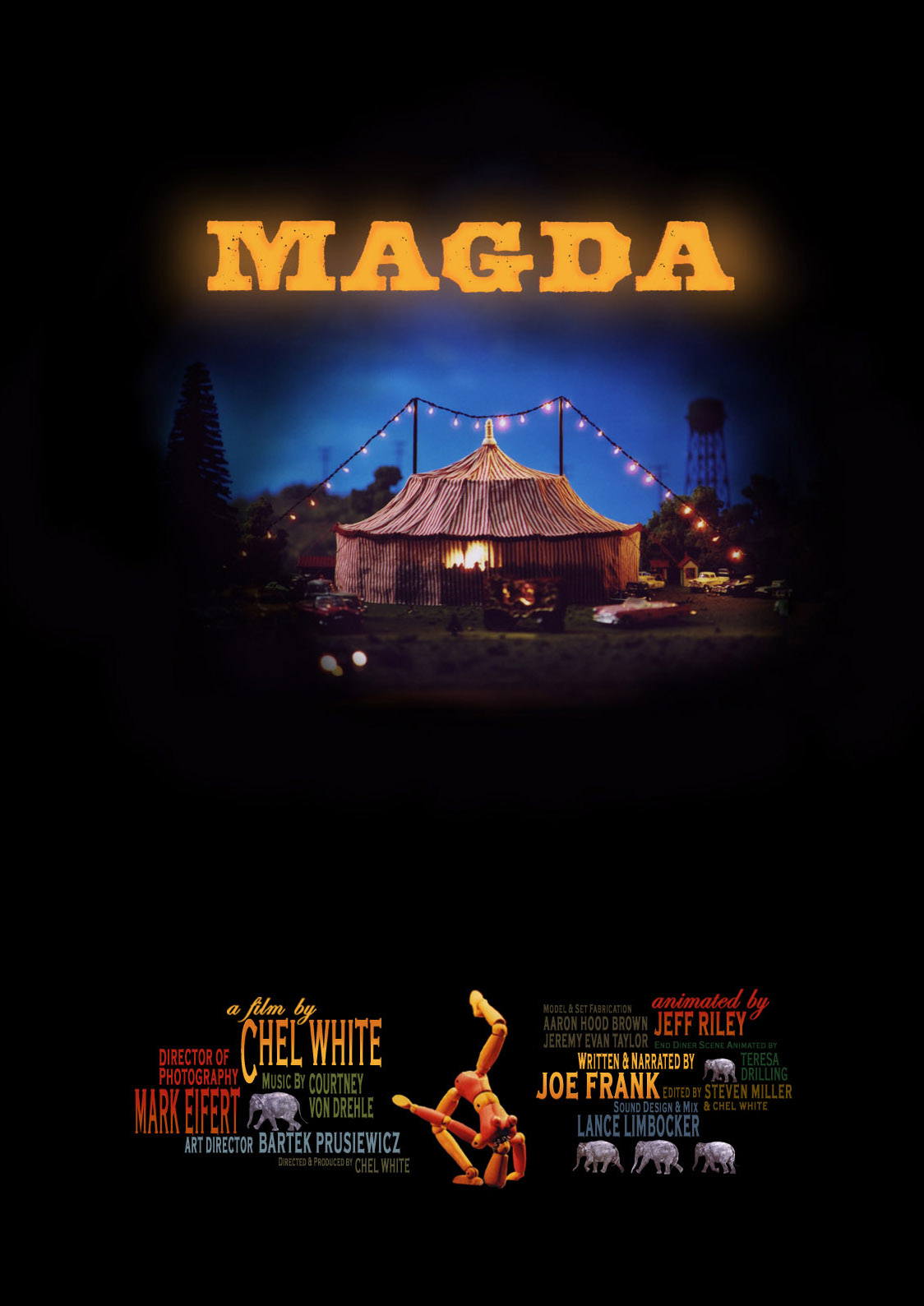
Official theatrical poster for Chel White's short animated film, Magda.

Magda is a 2004 stop motion animated short film by independent filmmaker Chel White, from a story written and read by monologist Joe Frank.

A first love is corrupted as a man recalls his affair with a beautiful circus contortionist in this stop-motion animation of wooden manikins.

Short of the Week's Serafima Serafimova describes Magda as "A love story so beautiful and incredibly touching in its simplicity… it's a real gem of untarnished beauty."

Visually, the film explores the use of extreme telephoto lenses, creating enigmatic scenes that reveal themselves over time, and ghostly figures drifting in-and-out of focus. Animation World Network describes the aesthetic as "swimming in the rack-focus sea of a telephoto lens with an extremely shallow depth of field. This can feel like the equivalent of driving through a thick fog, but it is also a very efficient means of directing the eye to the relevant action in some very busy sets." The characters in the film are derived from basic, pose-able wooden manikins found in any art supply store, but extensively redesigned and rigged to be usable as stop motion puppets.

== Awards/film Festivals ==
- Grand Jury Prize for Best Animated Short - 2004 Florida Film Festival
- World Premiere - Rotterdam International Film Festival
- Gold Hugo Nominee - Chicago International Film Festival

== Compilation ==
- The Animation Show, Volume 1 and 2, DVD, MTV Home Entertainment/Paramount (2007)
