= Chel White =

American film director

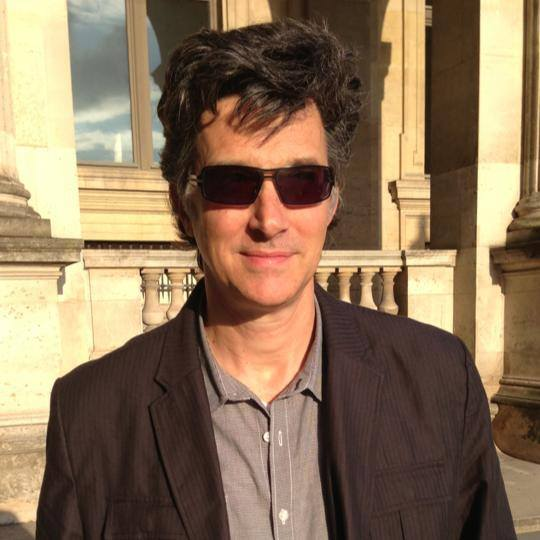
- Chel White, Paris, 2013
- Born: May 30, 1959 (age 67); Kansas City, Missouri, U.S.
- Education: Antioch University
- Occupations: Film director, screenwriter, composer
- Years active: 1985-present

Chel White (born May 30, 1959) is an American film director, animator, composer, screenwriter and visual effects artist. In his independent films and music videos, White is known for his stylized, often experimental use of images, unusual animation and narratives depicting an outsider's perspective. He often adopts darkly humorous and poetic sensibilities to explore topics of love, obsession and alienation; with dreams and the subconscious being his greatest influences. He describes his own work as "stories and images that reside on the brink of dreams, or linger on the periphery of distorted memories." A Rockefeller Fellow, Chel White has made three films based on the work of Peabody Award-winning writer and radio personality Joe Frank (Dirt, Soulmate, Magda).

Chale Nafus of the Austin Film Society says, "I have been amazed at the stylistic and thematic diversity in (White’s) films. Surreal, ethereal, wistful, and witty, I just allow my imagination to be taken into his complex, mysterious worlds.” The Austin Chronicle says, "(White's) work seems to dispatch itself in some secret, subversive code, flashing messages amid animation, obscure stock footage, and actors with crazy eyes."

White has directed music videos for Radiohead's Thom Yorke, The Melvins, Tom Brosseau, Chrystabell & David Lynch, and collaborated with the Oregon Symphony. He has worked extensively with film director Gus Van Sant, creating visual effects on several of Van Sant's projects. White began directing commercials in 1992, and with a focus in stop motion, began directing television programs in 1999, including two parodies for Saturday Night Live. Along with Ray Di Carlo and David Daniels, White is a co-founder of the international production company Bent Image Lab in Portland, Oregon.

== Early life and education ==
White was born in Kansas City, Missouri and grew up in Colorado, Michigan, Stockholm, and Evanston, Illinois where his father was a Northwestern University professor and his mother a schoolteacher. White cites his earliest influence as being the Surrealist paintings he was exposed to in grade school when visiting the Art Institute of Chicago. He began making films in high school where, studying under instructors Peter Kingsbury and Kevin Dole, he was introduced to the films of Norman McLaren, Harry Everett Smith, Bruce Conner, Maya Deren, Kenneth Anger, Will Hindle, Len Lye and Jean Cocteau. White recalls, "When I was 16, I realized animation was the bridge between being an artist and a filmmaker. At that point I never looked back." In 1984, he received a Bachelor of Arts degree in Visual Arts, with a central focus on experimental film, from Antioch College. During his time in Antioch College, he was in a band named The Blackouts, with John Flansburgh, who later formed the band They Might Be Giants.

== Independent filmmaker ==
White began making independent short films after college, starting with a drawn-on-film animation titled Metal Dogs of India (1985). In 1991, White completed Choreography for Copy Machine (Photocopy Cha Cha), an animated film created solely by using the unique photographic capabilities of a photocopier to generate sequential pictures of hands, faces, and other body parts. The film is widely considered the first noteworthy animated film using this technique. The Washington Post describes it as "(a) musical frolic which wittily builds on ghostly, distorted images crossing the plate glass of a copier." The films that followed include Dirt (1998), Soulmate (2000), Passage (2001), Magda (2004), A Painful Glimpse Into My Writing Process in Less Than 60 Seconds (2005), Wind (2007), the feature film Bucksville (2011), the Donald Trump horror parody Little Donnie (2017), and Dreams of a Fallen Astronaut (2020) part of the Gratzfilm omnibus The One Minute Memoir.

In 2002, as a poetic response to the tragedies of September 11, White created New York to be part of the omnibus collection Underground Zero. The Chicago Tribune called White's film "an eerie paean to the city itself," and Bill Stamets of the Chicago Reader said, “Chel White’s New York makes a ruined city enchanted again: jets ascend in twilight, framed by silhouetted rooftops and cranes, and droplets sparkle like tiny diamonds as kids delight in the spray of fire hydrants."

White's 2007 short film, Wind, was commissioned by Radiohead’s creative director Dilly Gent and the climate change awareness group Live Earth. The New York Times Magazine describes it as "(a) beautiful film, very moving, set to a poem by Antonio Machado and narrated by Alec Baldwin." Using a Robert Bly translation of the poem, Wind creates a metaphor for humanity's lack of planet stewardship. Along with eight other Live Earth commissioned films, "Wind" made its world premiere in the opening night program of the 2007 Tribeca Film Festival with keynote speaker Al Gore.

White's films have screened in the Sundance Film Festival, Berlinale, IFFR, SXSW, Ottawa International Animation Festival, Annecy Festival, Hiroshima International Animation Festival, HKIFF, SIFF, and the Edinburgh International Film Festival. 2012 saw the release of Bucksville, White's directorial feature film debut. Written and produced well before the Occupation of the Malheur National Wildlife Refuge and the 2016 Trump presidential election, Bucksville is a dark but eerily beautiful and prescient story about a young man who struggles to escape the reality of being bound for life to a disenfranchised, small town radical militia started 20 years ago by his father. Distributed by Phase 4 Films, Bucksville stars Thomas Stroppel, Ted Rooney and Allen Nause, with a cameo role by Tom Berenger as The Patron of Justice. The screenplay is by Laura McGie and White, with music by Tom Brosseau. Jamie S. Rich of The Oregonian calls Bucksville, "An insightful portrayal of an extreme point of view without the expected self-righteous critique."

White's museum screenings include the Van Gogh Museum The Brooklyn Museum, The Museum of Fine Arts, Boston and The High Museum in Atlanta. His retrospective presentations include the Ann Arbor Film Festival (1999 and 2002), Southern Circuit (2002), the Austin Film Society (2003), a 20-year career retrospective at the Northwest Film Center (Portland Art Museum) (2012), and a Bent Image Lab retrospective and masterclass at the Ottawa International Animation Festival (2018). White is the recipient of media arts Fellowships from The Rockefeller Foundation The Regional Arts & Culture Council, Portland Oregon, and project grants from Creative Capital, the Pacific Pioneer Fund and the Oregon Arts Commission. Fever Dreams and Heavenly Nightmares, a DVD compilation of White's short independent films, was released in 2006 by Microcinema International.

White is featured as one of six interviewees in Martin Cooper's feature documentary History, Mystery & Odyssey: The Lives and Work of Six Portland Animators (2023). The other interviewees are Joan C. Gratz, Jim Blashfield, Joanna Priestley, Rose Bond and Zak Margolis. The film premiered at the 2023 Ottawa International Animation Festival.

== Professional career ==
White started his professional career in 1986, working as an animator for film director Jim Blashfield on music videos for Paul Simon, Tears for Fears and Michael Jackson. In 1991, he began creating visual effects for director Gus Van Sant, starting with My Own Private Idaho (1991). White went on to be visual effects supervisor on Van Sant's Even Cowgirls Get The Blues (1993), Paranoid Park (2007), Milk (2008) and Restless (2011), as well as title effects supervisor on director Todd Haynes' film, I'm Not There, and the animation sequences in David Oyelowo's feature film, The Water Man (2020).

White directed two shorts for NBC's Saturday Night Live and Robert Smigel's Saturday TV Funhouse, The Narrator That Ruined Christmas (season 27, episode 9) and Blue Christmas (season 30, episode 8). Both are parodies of the Rudolph the Red-Nosed Reindeer television special (1964). Airing first on December 15, 2001, The Narrator That Ruined Christmas was written by Smigel, Michael Gordon, Louis CK and Stephen Colbert, with the voices of Chris Parnell, Maya Rudolph, Amy Poehler, Doug Dale, and Smigel. Airing first on December 18, 2004, Blue Christmas was written by Robert Smigel and Michelle Saks Smigel with additional material by Rich Blomquist, Stephen Colbert, Scott Jacobson, and Matt O'Brien, and voices by Maya Rudolph, Amy Poehler, Erik Bergmann, and Robert Smigel. The success of the SNL shorts led to other holiday themed stop motion projects that White would direct through Bent Image Lab, including two children's television specials for Hallmark Channel. In reviewing the 2011 television holiday programs, Mike Hale of The New York Times called Jingle All the Way, "By far the best of the bunch. In addition to its charming art and pleasantly low-key storytelling, 'Jingle' stands apart from the other holiday programs by not focusing on the manufacturing or delivery of toys."

In 2006, White directed the music video for Thom Yorke's song "Harrowdown Hill" (Best Music Video, 2007 SXSW). Along with his team and co-founders at Bent Image Lab, he pioneered Smallgantics, a digital miniaturizing technique first used in the "Harrowdown Hill" video. In 2012, White directed the video for the Chrysta Bell & David Lynch song "Bird of Flames", which has been described as "a haunting and surreal vision."

The commercials White directed have been honored with Clio Awards, a D&AD Award, a The One Club Award, two Association of Independent Commercial Producers (AICP) Awards, and two are included in the permanent collection of the Museum of Modern Art in New York. His personal favorite ads he directed are for the Washington State Department of Health in a campaign of surreal anti-smoking public service announcements aimed at children.

White's composer credits include Joan C. Gratz's Academy Award winning animated short film Mona Lisa Descending a Staircase, Joanna Priestley and Joan C. Gratz's animated short Pro and Con, Choreography for Copy Machine (as Citizen M), "A Bird Is Following Me" with Tom Brosseau, and the feature film Bucksville. From 1981 to 1982, he was a member of the techno duo Process Blue (Dark Entries Records). 2019 saw the release of "Automaton", a vinyl record of White's experimental and soundtrack music from between 1985 and 1991 (Platform 23 Recordings). White's screenwriting credits include Bucksville (feature), Little Donnie (short), story development for Jingle All the Way, and the story adaptation based on the original Rudolph the Red-Nosed Reindeer for the SimEx-Iwerks 4D attraction film of the same title. As an actor, White had a role in Even Cowgirls Get the Blues (1993), playing a brain surgeon in a scene with Uma Thurman.

== Personal life ==
Since 1985, White has lived in Portland, Oregon.

== Filmography ==
=== Compilations and feature-length film ===
- The One Minute Mistake, segment: My Perilous Journey Through A.I. (2023)
- The Retention Department of Perpetual Exhaustion, segment: Mr. French's Secret (2022)
- The One Minute Memoir, segment: Dreams of a Fallen Astronaut (2020)
- Filmmakers Unite (FU), segment: Little Donnie (2017)
- Bucksville (2012)
- The Animation Show, segment: Magda (2007)
- Fever Dreams and Heavenly Nightmares: The Short Films of Chel White (2006)
- Underground Zero: Part II, segment: New York (2002)
- 23rd Tournee of Animation, Choreography for Copy Machine (Photocopy Cha Cha) (1991)

=== Short films ===
- My One Minute Memoir: Dreams of a Fallen Astronaut (2020)
- Little Donnie (2017)
- Wind (2007)
- A Painful Glimpse Into MY Writing Process (In Less Than 60 Seconds) (2005)
- Magda (2004)
- Eclipse (2003)
- New York (2002)
- Passage (2001)
- Soulmate (2000)
- The Beats, the Bomb and the 1950s: Robert Briggs (1999)
- Dirt (1998)
- Pro and Con (1993), composer
- Choreography for Copy Machine (Photocopy Cha Cha) (1991)
- Machine Song (1987)
- Metal Dogs of India (1985)

=== Videography ===
- Dean Hurley - No More (2022)
- Tom Brosseau - Tami (2014)
- Chrystabell and David Lynch - Bird of Flames (2012)
- Thom Yorke - Harrowdown Hill (2006)
- Season to Risk - Blood Ugly (1994)
- Melvins - Hooch (1993)
- Candlebox - Change (1992)

=== Television ===
- Jingle All the Way (TV special) (2011)
- Saturday Night Live / Saturday TV Funhouse Blue Christmas (2004)
- Saturday Night Live / Saturday TV Funhouse The Narrator Who Ruined Christmas (2001)
- The PJs / Ghetto Superstars (2000)

=== Commercials and Public Service Announcements ===
- American Indian College Fund - One Percent (2015)
- Lux (soap) - Provocateur (2006)
- Washington State Department of Health - Park and Rec Room (2005)
- OfficeMax - Santa's Helper (2005)
- Reese's Pieces - Center of Attention (2003) (co-directed with David Daniels)
- Fila - Mash (1994)
- Memorial Blood Centers - Photocopy Jazz (1992)

=== Appearances ===
- History, Mystery & Odyssey, documentary feature film by Martin Cooper, interviewee (2023)
- Live Wire Radio, Episode #198, interviewee (November 12, 2012)
- Art In Context, PBS / KLRU, interviewee (March 15, 2010)
- The American Avant Garde, interviewee (2004)
- Exposure, The Sci-Fi Channel (SyFy), interviewee (2000)
- Oregon Art Beat, Season 2 Episode #219, interviewee (April 5, 2000)
- Even Cowgirls Get The Blues, acting role as brain surgeon (1993)

=== Other media ===
- Cahiers du Musée National d'Art Moderne (Notebooks of the National Museum of Modern Art), No. 175, periodical, Xerographies, Choreography for Copy Machine, Editions Center Pompidou (2026)
- Animation Sketchbooks, book, featured artist, Chronicle Books LLC, by Laura Heit (2013)
- Animation in Process, book, featured artist, London: Laurence King, by Andrew Selby (2009)

== Fellowships, grants, awards and honors ==
- 2026: Harvard Film Archive Choreography for Copy Machine (Photocopy Cha Cha), added to permanent collection as a 16mm film print.
- 2008: Oregon Arts Commission, Project Grant, feature film development, Stranded.
- 2007: Rockefeller Foundation, Media Artist Fellowship, feature film development, Stranded, based on his own experience of being stranded in his car for four days during a mountain snow storm.
- 2007: SXSW, Best Music Video, Thom Yorke, Harrowdown Hill.
- 2006: The AICP Show at MoMA, Office Max Santa's Helper, included in The Art and Technique of the American Television Commercial, permanent collection, Museum of Modern Art New York.
- 2006: Bend Film Festival, Best Short Film, A Painful Glimpse Into My Writing Process (In Less Than 60 Seconds)
- 2005: Regional Arts & Culture Council, Media Artist Fellowship, feature film development.
- 2005: Ann Arbor Film Festival, EMPA Work Life Award, Magda.
- 2004: Florida Film Festival, Grand Jury Award for Best Animated Short, Magda.
- 2001: Creative Capital, feature film screenplay development, Path of Bees.
- 1998: Stockholm International Film Festival, Best Short Film, Dirt.
- 1994: The AICP Show at MoMA, Fila Mash, included in the program The Art and Technique of the American Television Commercial, permanent collection, Museum of Modern Art New York.
- 1992: Ann Arbor Film Festival, Best Animated Film, Choreography for Copy Machine (Photocopy Cha Cha).
- 1991: Chicago International Film Festival, Nominated for Best Short Film, Winner Gold Plaque for Animation, Choreography for Copy Machine (Photocopy Cha Cha).

== See also ==
- Joe Frank
- David Lynch
- Gus Van Sant
- Thom Yorke
- Tom Brosseau
- Joan C. Gratz
- David Daniels (filmmaker)
- Saturday TV Funhouse
- Norman McLaren
- Stop motion
- Choreography for Copy Machine
- Dirt (1998 film)
- Magda (2004 film)
