= Prescott Wright =

American film producer

Prescott J. Wright (May 8, 1935, Bronx, New York – December 28, 2006, Albuquerque, New Mexico) was best known as the longtime producer and film distributor of the annual touring programs of animated films from around the world known as the International Tournée of Animation. In addition, he was one of the founding directors of the Ottawa International Animated Film Festival in Canada, which began in 1976 and which is now held annually, as well as being instrumental in fostering the art of animated films throughout his working life.

== Early life ==
Prescott Wright was raised in the Bronx, was stationed in the Army at Fort Ord, and went to Monterey Peninsula College. The school had a film series run by Phil Chamberlin and Pres became active with it, running the projectors and helping in other ways. His resume says he was president of the film society and jazz club. In 1963, Chamberlin recommended Prescott, who had recently married, for a job at Brandon Films (also known as Western Cinema Guild) in San Francisco as an assistant and, when the manager left, Prescott became head of the San Francisco office. Brandon was a major 16mm film distributor of American and foreign features and shorts.

In 1969 he moved to Los Angeles to work at the American Film Institute (AFI). They sent him to New York City in January 1970 to market films produced with AFI grants. In a letter to a friend dated December 1970 he wrote, "By September I had sold about $50 grand worth of films and was applying for my own iron lung. There were some good $$ deals with some major companies if I would stay in New York."

In 1971 he returned to college. He received a BA in communication and the visual arts in 1973 from what was then called California State University, San Francisco and an MA in Film in 1977 from the renamed San Francisco State University. He was a teaching assistant and then a part-time instructor at SF State from 1972–1980. He also taught an extension course in film for the University of California at Berkeley in 1975.

== International Tournee of Animation ==
Taking up an offer to take on distribution of the "Tourney (sic) of Animation" (as it was initially written), he acquired eight films from KQED-TV and began FilmWright, his small film distribution company, to late 1970.

About 1966 several members of ASIFA-Hollywood (Bill Scott, Bill Littlejohn, Les Goldman and June Foray) decided to put together an international animation program to be shown at the Los Angeles County Museum of Art. Since it was almost impossible to see quality animation in the US at that time, Prescott became active with the group when he joined the AFI in 1969 and, having worked previously in film distribution, he was asked to head the project when they decided to show the program in other cities. Under his guidance, the program became known as the International Tournee of Animation and, in late 1970 or early 1971, he began to book the program at the San Francisco Museum of Modern Art, university campuses and other cultural institutions around this country.

FilmWright produced the Tournee under a contract in which the company received 50% of gross revenue, with the other 50% distributed among the animators. Of the animators' share, roughly half was divided equally between each filmmaker, while the remainder was allocated proportionally based on the length of each short film. This meant shorter films received a somewhat smaller share than longer ones.

In the 1970s Gary Meyer, who ran the U.C. Theater in Berkeley, California and became a co-founder Landmark Theatres, convinced Prescott to expand his distribution of the Tournee of Animation to theaters:

“We needed interesting new programming and approached Prescott about showing the Tournee in theaters. He had only screened at colleges and museums. He took the leap with us and the result was a greatly expanded audience for animated shorts. At a certain point, he was burned out. Assembling a feature length package, distributing it and keeping a couple dozen filmmakers happy is an overwhelming task. Steve Gilula, Terry Thoren and I agreed to buy the Tournee with the understanding that Prescott would continue to provide guidance as we moved forward. And what a mentor he was!”

Author and animation historian Jerry Beck noted:

“I met Prescott shortly after I moved to L.A. in 1986, when I came to work with Terry Thoren to distribute the Tournee for Expanded Entertainment. Prescott was always friendly, knowledgeable and eager to help us communicate with filmmakers and theatre owners across the country and around the world. Prescott was a pioneer – in those pre-cable, pre-Internet days – in getting independent and international animation showcased and making those films accessible to those unable to attend festivals in far off lands. Without Wright's vision, the Ottawa festival would not be what it is; successor-touring programs like Spike and Mike’s shows and “The Animation Show” would not be, and ASIFA-SF would not be the strong chapter it is.”

== Involvement with ASIFA internationally and locally and with animated film festivals ==
Between 1975 and 1985, Prescott was on the board of directors of ASIFA, the International Animated Film Association, which had over 30 chapters around the world. Until the Iron Curtain collapsed, ASIFA helped bridge the gap between East and West by helping animators from Eastern Europe attend festivals in the West, to visit studios in the Europe and North America, and to show their films in-person. Pres, David Ehrlich, Howard Beckerman, Charles Samu, John Halas, John Hubley and others worked hard to further international relations and to arrange for these screenings in cities with ASIFA chapters.

He was also a founder of ASIFA-San Francisco in 1975. Because of his guidance, the chapter grew over the years, and it is known for presenting good programs and having a very informative newsletter.

Prescott served as an advisor to major animation festivals around the world, and regularly attended the ASIFA-sponsored festivals in Annecy, France, and Zagreb, (then in Yugoslavia).

He was a founder and the first International Director of the Ottawa International Animation Festival in 1976 and served in that capacity in 1978, 1980, 1982, and also in 1992. In 2004, the Ottawa festival made him an Honorary President of the festival, but he was unable to attend the event due to his health problems. ASIFA-Hollywood has also honored him with the "June Foray Award" for benevolent and significant contributions to the art of animation at the “Annie Awards”.

== Film festivals and television ==
Pres served a year as director of the Denver International Film Festival (1980/81) and, returning to San Francisco, became the producer of "The Animators", a series of TV programs made in 1982 for KQED-TV in San Francisco which featured Bay Area talent such as Jeff Hale, Bud Luckey, Rudy Zamora, Sally Cruickshank and Marcy Page.

Organized by ASIFA-Hollywood during the Los Angeles Summer Olympic Games of 1984, Prescott was involved, as Director, with the creation and management of the "Olympiad of Animation", which was shown in Los Angeles at the Academy of Motion Picture Arts and Sciences' Samuel Goldwyn Theater. For one program, the organizers polled one hundred animation professionals around the world to determine which animated films were regarded as the greatest of all time; over 30 of the films were shown. He was proud of the fact that he brought the project in under budget.

== Other cultural events ==
He also was involved with many other cultural events over the years. These included serving as a member of the Film Arts Foundation board of directors in San Francisco from the late 1960s (and as President of the Board from 1978 to 1979), and as Treasurer of the Society for Animation Studies in the late 1980s and early 1990s (with Harvey Deneroff, the founder and first president of that association).

In 1990, Prescott worked for Disney's Feature Division as a "Creative Staffing Specialist". He spent 4- months traveling to international animation festivals as a spotter and recruiter of animation talent. He planned to travel to festivals in Hiroshima, Annecy, Zagreb and also in Russia.

After Disney, he worked in both the Philippines and Southern India as an instructor and festival director for emerging animation studios. While he was in India he programmed and managed the first "Week with the Masters" for Toonz India, an emerging animation studio at Trivandrum in October 1999.

== See also ==
- List of animators
