= Dirt (1998 film) =

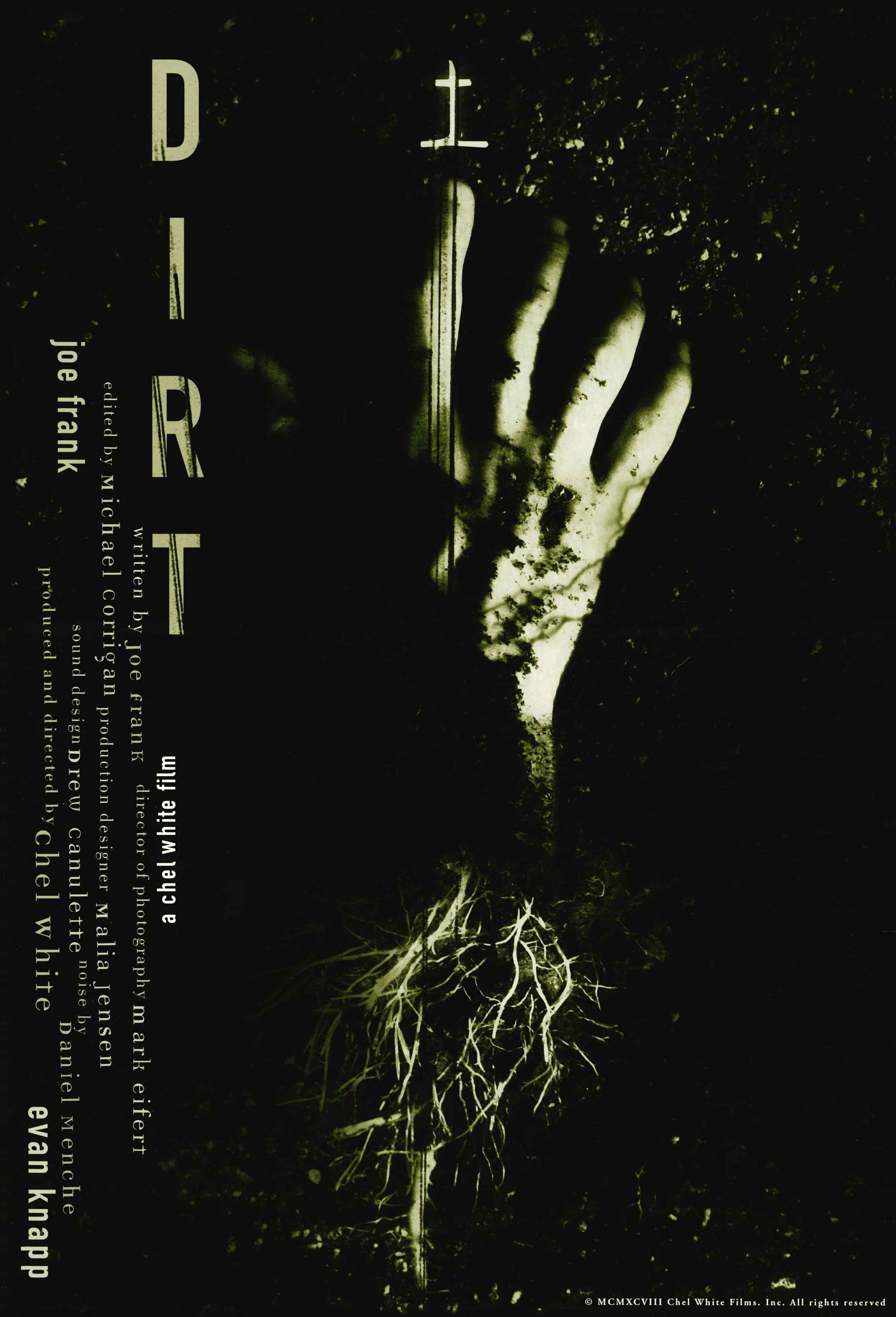
Official theatrical poster

Dirt is a four-minute film by independent filmmaker Chel White. A man's strange obsession with dirt starts as a childhood game, but eventually manifests itself on a most surreal level. The dark humor, expressionistic images create an allegory for individuality and self-sufficiency, in this off-beat ecological parable. The short narrative is taken from a radio program written and read by Joe Frank, and stars Evan Knapp, with cinematography by Mark Eifert.

The American independent film producer Christine Vachon describes the film as "A post-modern Invasion of the Body Snatchers". The Stockholm Film Festival calls it, "A very original and inspired work. Sharp and to the point."

== Awards/Film Festivals ==
- Best Short Film - 1998 Stockholm Film Festival
- Official Selection in Competition - 1999 Sundance Film Festival
- Best Experimental Film - 1999 USA Film Festival
- Director's Citation - 1999 Thomas Edison Film Festival (formerly the Black Maria Film and Video Festival)
- World Premiere - 1998 Montréal World Film Festival
