= International Tournée of Animation =

Annual touring program of animated films

- Nickname: The First Festival of Animated Film
- Begins: 1965
- Founder: ASIFA-Hollywood

The International Tournée of Animation was an annual touring program of alternative animated films that started in 1965 as The First Festival of Animated Film with each selected and assembled from films from many countries around the world and which existed from the 1970s to the 1980s-90s.

== Typical program content ==
As released to cinemas, college campuses, and art museums and centers across the United States, a typical Tournée program ran about 105 minutes and consisted of 15 to 24 animated films in the 16mm format, each running from 1 or 2 minutes to 15 or 18 minutes each in length.

An example of the typical range of countries represented comes from the 14th Tournée in 1980 which contained 18 award-winning films from Canada, France, United Kingdom, The Netherlands, Hungary, United States and Yugoslavia. Altogether over twenty annual programs were prepared and presented; the 17th International Tournée of Animation was devoted entirely to the films of the National Film Board of Canada.

== History ==
About 1966, several members of ASIFA-Hollywood (The Los Angeles branch of ASIFA, the International Animated Film Association) decided to put together an international animation program to be shown at the Los Angeles County Museum of Art. It was almost impossible to see quality animation in the US at that time. Prescott Wright became active with the group when he joined the American Film Institute in 1969 and, having worked previously in film distribution, he was asked to head the project when it was decided to show the program in other cities.

Under Wright's guidance, the program became known as the "International Tournée of Animation" and, by late 1970, he began to book the program at the San Francisco Museum of Modern Art, university campuses, and other cultural institutions around the US.

The animators were offered a generous contract as part of their agreement to enter their films in the Tournée. As producers, Wright and his associates received 50% of the gross, while the remaining 50% was split among the artists. About half of the money going to the animators was split evenly between each filmmaker and the remaining amount was split based on the length of each short film. This meant that a very short film got slightly less than the one which was a minute or two longer.

=== Increased visibility through theatrical screenings ===
In the mid-1970s, the Tournée increased its visibility by being screened in cinemas, initially thanks to a sale with the Landmark Theatres chain, but gradually seen in many smaller "art houses" across the country. In 1986 Prescott Wright sold the rights to the Tournées to the Expanded Entertainment group (which was under the leadership of Terry Thoren and the expertise of animation historian Jerry Beck) in Los Angeles which continued to organize them for several years with Wright's guidance.

Coverage of the festivals (both Tournee and Animation Celebration) ranged from praises by film critics, including Leonard Maltin for Entertainment Tonight, to guest appearances on talk shows such as The Today Show.

== Notable films that played at Tournée and Los Angeles International Animation Celebration ==
- Why Me?
- Second Class Mail
- All My Relations
- Face Like a Frog
- Little Wolf
- Seryi Volk & Krasnaya Shapochka and other works by Garri Bardin
- A Christmas Carol and other works by Richard Williams
- Jumping
- The Fly
- Kick Me
- Arabesque
- Harpya
- Mr. Pascal and other works by Alison De Vere
- The Wizard of Speed and Time
- Dream Doll
- Technological Threat
- The Man Who Planted Trees
- Skywhales
- Ubu
- The Sandman
- Ode to G.I. Joe
- The Sweater
- Balance
- The Killing of an Egg and other works by Paul Driessen
- Juke-Bar
- Girls Night Out
- Luxo Jr.
- Your Face and other works by Bill Plympton
- A Greek Tragedy
- The Big Snit
- Anna & Bella
- Charade
- Open Wednesdays
- The Great Cognito and other works by Will Vinton
- The Cow
- Tin Toy
- Vincent
- Arnold Escapes from Church
- Reci, Reci, Reci
- Red's Dream
- The Cat Came Back
- Creature Comforts
- Bottom's Dream
- Anijam
- Frog Baseball
- Big House Blues
- Red Ball Express
- Special Delivery
- History of the World in Three Minutes Flat
- Satiemania
- Selected clips from Allegro non troppo and other works by Bruno Bozzetto
- 78 Tours and other works by Georges Schwizgebel
- Choreography for Copy Machine (Photocopy Cha Cha)
- Broken Down Film
- The Simpsons shorts from The Tracy Ullman Show
- Quasi's Cabaret Trailer
- Tuber's Two-Step
- Propagandance
- Knick Knack
- The Brave Little Toaster
- Footrot Flats: The Dog's Tale
- Darkness/Light/Darkness
- Rock Odyssey
- Get a Job
- It's An O.K. Life
- The Adventures of Andre and Wally B
- Nausicaä of the Valley of the Wind (under the title Warriors of the Wind)
- Strings
- Blackfly
- Son of the White Mare
- Starchaser: The Legend of Orin
- Castle in the Sky
- The Pied Piper
- Cat City
- Harlem Shuffle and other works by Ralph Bakshi
- Sequences from Pee-Wee's Playhouse
- Family Dog
- When the Bats are Quiet
- When the Wind Blows
- Felix the Cat: The Movie
- Lupo the Butcher

== Frequent animation studios ==
- Buzzco Associates
- Pixar Animation Studios
- National Film Board of Canada
- Aardman Animations
- Zagreb Film

== See also ==
- Anime
- The Animation Showcase
- Spike and Mike's Festival of Animation
- Animation Show of Shows
- The Animation Show
- Independent animation
- Annecy International Animation Film Festival
- Fantastic Animation Festival
- Academy Award for Best Animated Short Film
- Arthouse animation
- Cult film
