= Jingle All the Way (2011 film) =

- Written by: Allan Neuwirth
- Directed by: Chel White
- Starring: Ryan Bley, Thomas Stroppel
- Narrated by: Chad Darrow
- Music by: Charles-Henri Avelange
- Country of origin: United States
- Original language: English

Production
- Producer: Bent Image Lab
- Cinematography: Mark Eifert
- Editor: JD Dawson
- Running time: 22 minutes
- Production company: Bent Image Lab

Original release
- Release: November 25, 2011

Jingle All the Way is a 2011 American stop motion animated children's television special produced for Hallmark Channel, directed by Chel White and produced at Bent Image Lab. The show is inspired by Hallmark Cards' 2010 stuffed toy Jingle the Husky Pup and its accompanying interactive storybook, Jingle All the Way. The special premiered on the Hallmark Channel on November 25, 2011.

== Plot ==
A young boy named Andrew visits a Christmas tree farm with his family a few days before the holidays. Andrew instantly bonds with a young Husky pup named Jingle, who is searching for a home for Christmas. As the boy rides away, unable to keep him, the pup escapes and embarks on a snowy journey to find his friend again. Guided by a wise cardinal and the sound of jingle bells, Jingle receives the help he needs from Santa just in time for Christmas morning.

== Cast ==
- Thomas Stroppel as Jingle
- Ryan Bley as Andrew
- Chad Darrow as Narrator and Santa Claus
- Morgan Cox as Mom
- Nathan Dunkin as Dad
- Jonathan Lipow as Animal Control Officer
- Pamela Chollet as Mrs. Hibbert and Teacher
- Allison Cohen as Sarah
- Brian Finnerty as Cardinal
- Lindsey Newlands as Jennifer
- Nicholas Marjarian as Kevin
- Croix Kyles as Jonathan
- Gregg Victor as Tree Salesman
- Lara Cody as Nasally Kid

== Reception ==
In reviewing the 2011 television holiday special programs, Mike Hale of The New York Times called Jingle All the Way "...by far the best of the bunch. In addition to its charming art and pleasantly low-key storytelling, “Jingle” stands apart from the other holiday programs by not focusing on the manufacturing or delivery of toys." Hale also mentions, "For some honest emotion, and a combination of retro holiday spirit with adventurous animation, tune in for Jingle All the Way...(it) looks like something you’d see at a European animation festival or late at night on Adult Swim, but it is also gentle and completely Hallmark-appropriate." Jingle All the Way was nominated for Best TV Special at the 2012 Annecy International Animation Film Festival.

== Sequel ==
The sequel, Jingle and Bell's Christmas Star, premiered on Hallmark Channel on November 23, 2012. This special introduces Bell, another plush toy in Hallmark's Husky Pups line. This show features a rendition of the song "Jingle Bells" performed by country musician Keith Urban.
