= Choreography for Copy Machine =

Experimental animation film by Chel White

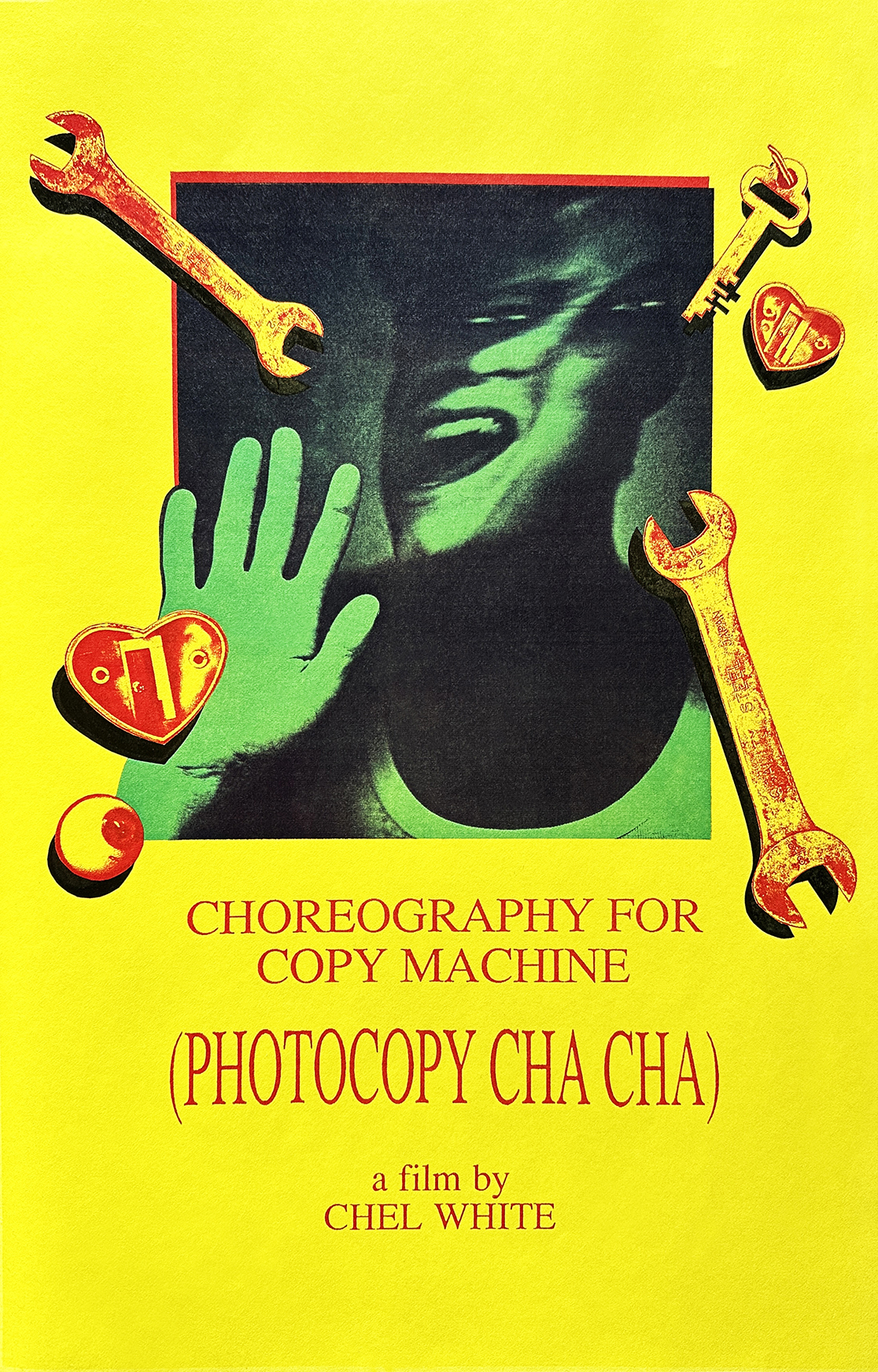
Theatrical poster for "Choreography for Copy Machine (Photocopy Cha Cha)" (digital photograph of paper poster)

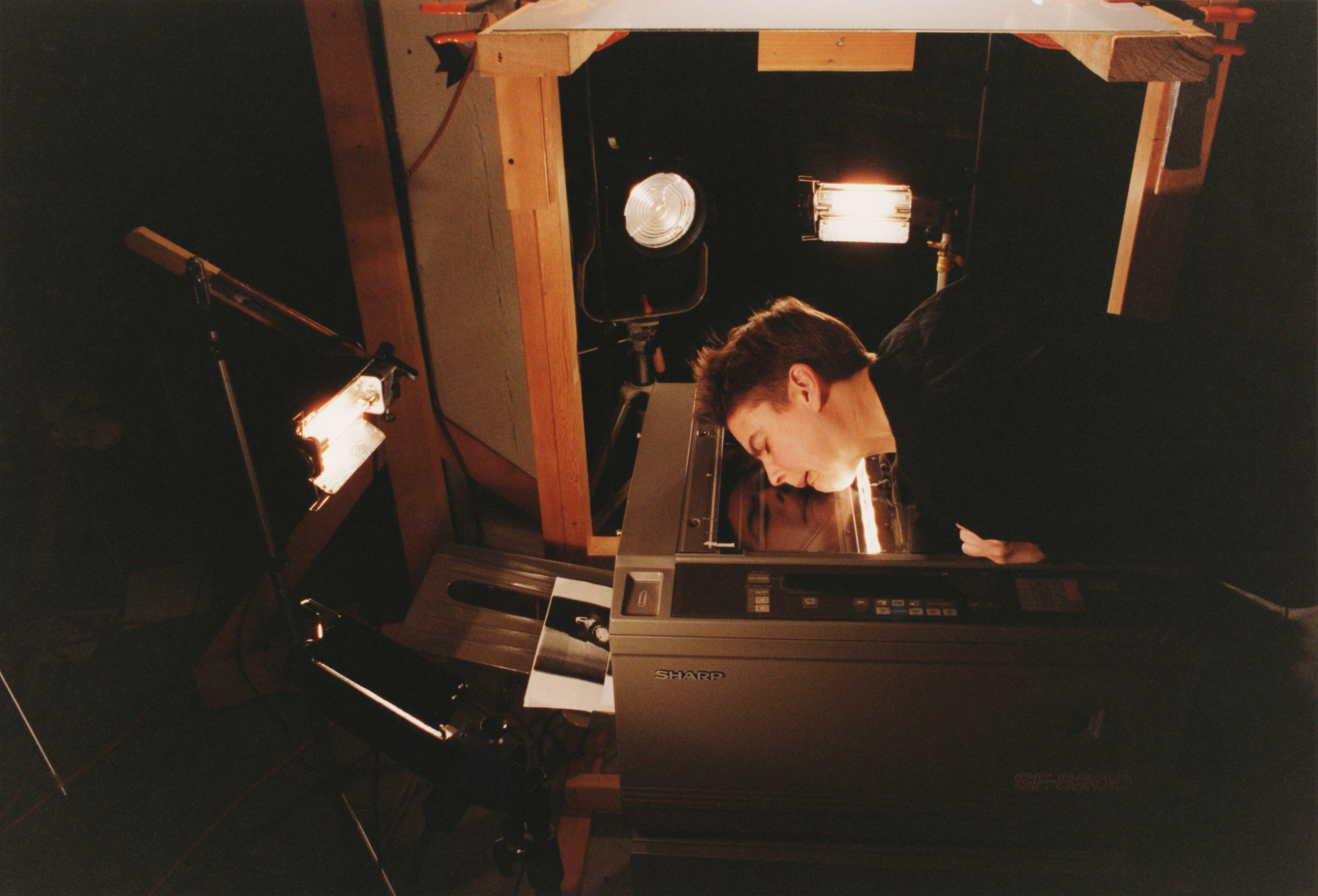
The set up Chel White created for his direct photocopy technique. In addition to four side lights (three of which are pictured), there is a top light positioned behind a sheet of frosted glass that allows for the silhouettes of people and objects to be visible.

Choreography for Copy Machine (Photocopy Cha Cha) is a four-minute experimental animation film by independent filmmaker Chel White.

== Technique ==
All of the film's images were created solely by using the unique photographic capabilities of a photocopier to generate sequential pictures of hands, faces, and other body parts. It achieves a ghostly, dream-like aesthetic with elements of the sensual and the absurd. Completed in 1991, it is widely considered the first noteworthy animated film to use this technique. (See Xerox art for historical context.)

For the film, Chel White developed a customized set up that could achieve the level of detail he was looking for in the images. After removing the platen cover, four side lights were added along with a top light that would shine through a sheet of frosted glass, allowing for his subject peoples’ silhouettes to be visible. In order to avoid potential eye damage from the bright light of the scanner, he instructed his performers not to open their eyes as they were being scanned. Instead, White painted eyes on their eyelids.

== Reception ==
The Washington Post describes the film as a “musical frolic which wittily builds on ghostly, distorted images crossing the plate glass of a copier.” Filmfest DC calls it, "true art in the age of mechanical reproduction; a rhythmic celebration of a photocopier’s cinematic potential." The Berlin International Film Festival describes the film as “a swinging essay about physiognomy in the age of photo-mechanical reproduction. The Dallas Observer says, "(The film) takes a game we've all played with our hands, faces, and other body parts and raises it to the sublime." The Austin Chronicle writes, "(The film) pulses with a grinding sort of ghostly sexuality.” Alive TV says, "Your relationship to your copy machine may never be the same." And Entertainment Weekly says, "Chel White’s (Choreography for Copy Machine) ”Photocopy Cha Cha”, featuring rubbery, photocopied images of faces and assorted other body parts, is a reflection on the way technology alters our perceptions."

== Awards/Film Festivals ==
- Special Program – 2001 Sundance Film Festival"Sundance Institute".
- Best Animated Short Film – 1992 Ann Arbor Film Festival
- Gold Plaque – 1992 Chicago International Film Festival
- First Place – 1992 USA Film Festival
- Official Selection – 1992 Berlin International Film Festival
- Official Selection – 1991 Rotterdam International Film Festival
- 23rd International Tournée of Animation (1991)
