= Strata-cut animation =

Clay animation technique

Strata-cut animation, also spelled stratcut or straticut, is a form of clay animation, itself one of many forms of stop motion animation.

Strata-cut animation is most commonly a form of clay animation in which a long bread-like "loaf" of clay, internally packed tight and loaded with varying imagery, is sliced into thin sheets, with the animation camera taking a frame of the end of the loaf for each cut, eventually revealing the movement of the internal images within. Wax may be used instead of clay for the loaf, but this can be more difficult to use because it is less malleable.

== Technique ==
Designing the interior contents of a clay block is complex in and of itself. Abstract images and patterns are easier to create than recognizable images or character-driven moving images. Both the pace and form of the movements of the internal imagery have to be considered when building the block (or loaf). A kind of non-high-tech "underground" quality of the all-moving imagery is usually the result.

Interesting abstract images can be created by folding strips of different-colored clay together, flattening them out, and then folding them again, repeating this process until the final result is a relatively tight mosaic of "woven" patterns. Eventually, a series of blocks of these mosaics can be combined into single blocks (loafs) and also combined with non-abstract imagery.

== History ==
Experimentally toyed with in both clay and blocks of wax by German animator Oskar Fischinger and his associate Walter Rutmann during the 1920s and 1930s, a crude form is specifically found in the Lotte Reiniger film "Prince Achmed". The technique was revived, named and highly refined with precision and control in the mid-1980s by California-Oregon animator David Daniels, a past associate of Will Vinton, in his 16-minute short film Buzz Box.

== In popular culture ==
The method of strata-cut animation was used in the music video for "Big Time" by Peter Gabriel (1986), for the "ABC" part of Michael Jackson's Moonwalker video compilation, and in the title sequence for the 1993 film Freaked. Daniels has also used it as background imagery as other forms of animation or live action are superimposed over it.

Daniels has used variations of this style for a variety of TV commercials and bits made for the Pee Wee's Playhouse series during the mid-1980s, "10th Anniversary Birthday", a network ID for MTV, and an 'acid trip' section from the television series Gary and Mike. In reference to the 'time sculpted extrusion block' or 'geometry loaf' slice-reveal technique, Daniels coined the visual results or look as ‘insanimation’ in 1984 while a graduate student at Cal Arts.

In the 6th episode of season 3's Smiling Friends "Squim Returns," (2025) a rhythmic musical montage takes places, wherein a food-poisoned, parasite-infected Charlie experiences stratacut hallucinations as he dazedly rushes to make it into work.

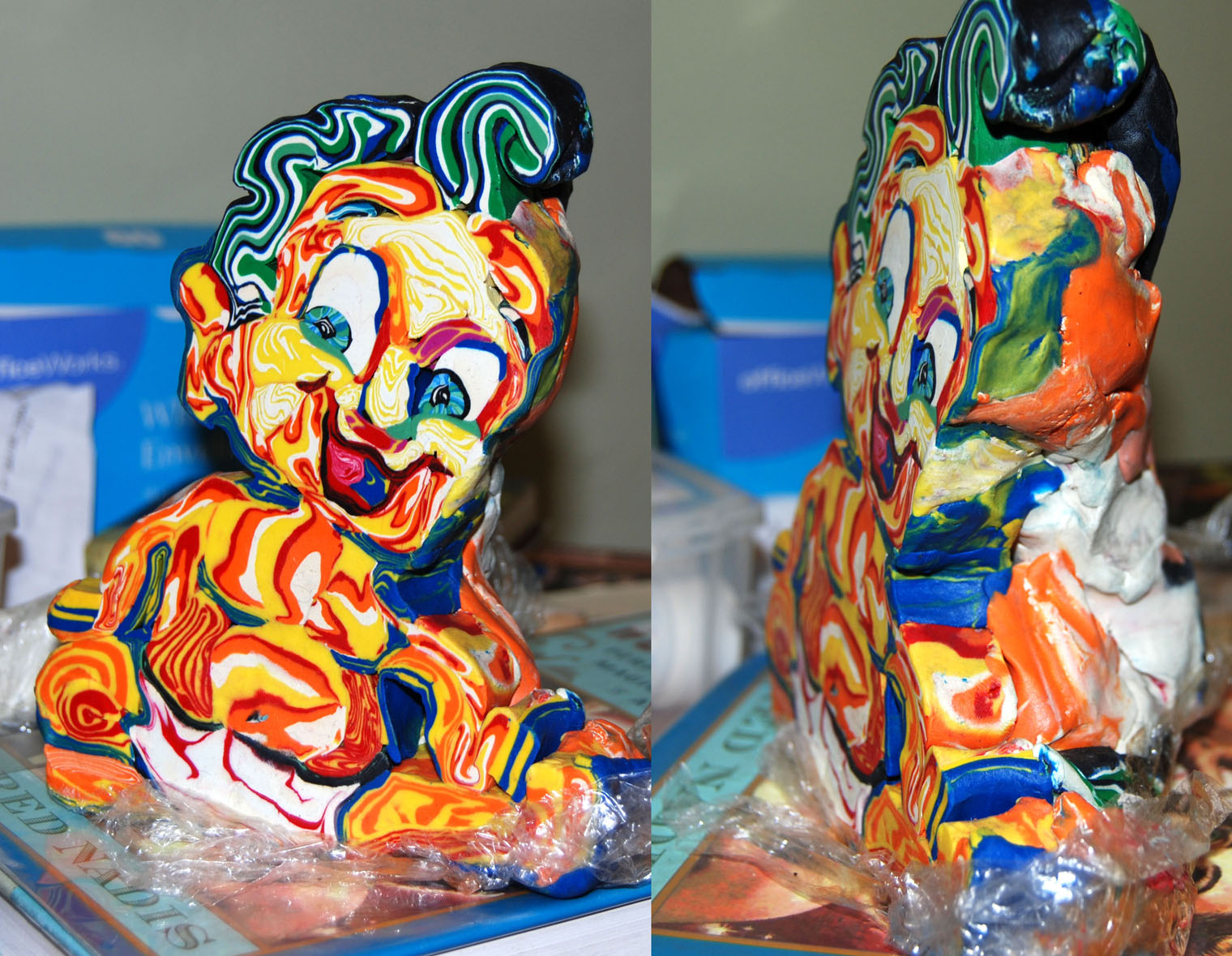
An example of a strata-cut sculpture by David Daniels.
