= Carlos Lascano =

Argentine director, writer and producer (born 1973)

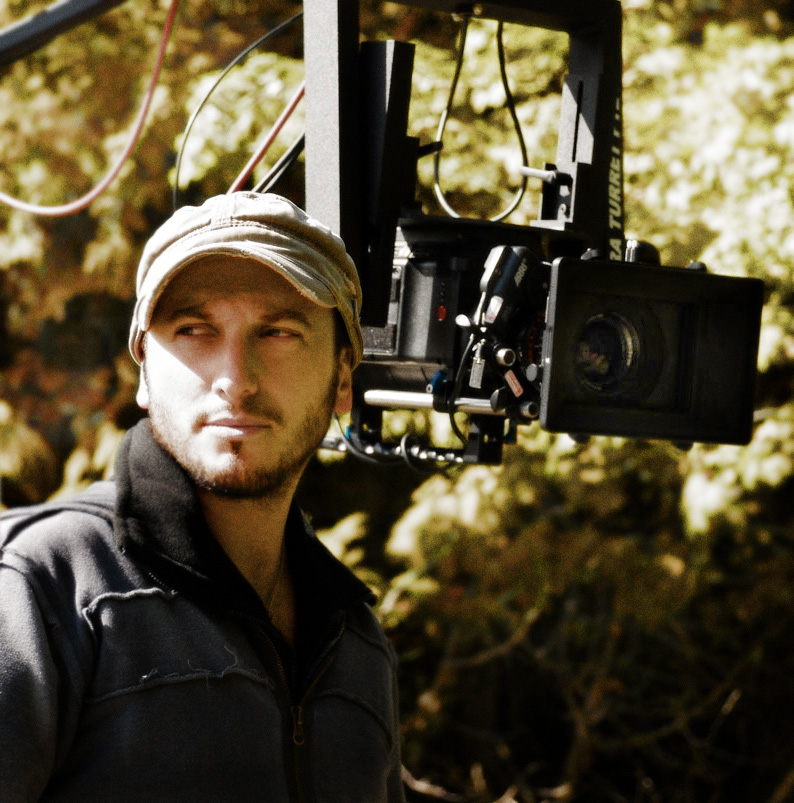
- Carlos Lascano at a shooting in Toronto, Canada (Sept 2008)
- Born: 8 June 1973 (age 53); Mar del Plata, Argentina
- Occupations: Writer, director, producer, illustrator
- Years active: 1991 — present

Carlos Lascano (born June 8, 1973) is an Argentine director, writer and producer mainly known for his works in animation and illustration.

== Early years ==
Born and raised in Mar del Plata, Argentina, Carlos Lascano started his art career at an early age, as he was a child gifted at drawing, painting and story telling. At the age of fourteen, he had completed over two hundred pages of a comic of his creation, and by the age of twenty five he had already had a painting exhibition, written a graphic novel, completed Law School, founded his own Production Company and concluded Marionettes, his first feature film, for which he was awarded the Silver Prize as "Best Experimental Feature Film" at the 1998 Worldfest. The same film later came to be part of the reference material used at the Manuel Antín's Cinema University, in Buenos Aires.

== Career ==
In 2002 he moved to Spain and worked as filmmaker, editor, script writer, special effects supervisor and animator for cinema, television, documentaries and advertisement, not only for Spain but also for France, Italy, United Kingdom and the United States. He worked in several TV movies for Televisió de Catalunya, wrote and directed video clips for recognized Spanish musicians and worked alongside important artists like Javier Bardem and Álex de la Iglesia. His original artwork, editing and animation direction of The Legend of the Scarecrow earned the short film over 20 awards worldwide, including a Goya Awards nomination and a pre-selection to the 2005 Oscar Academy Awards.

In 2008, Carlos published online an animation short film, A short love story in Stop Motion, with Hoppípolla, by Sigur Rós, as music score. The short film collected over two million views and around 40.000 quotations in websites from all over the globe in the first six months, reaching over 9 million views in the next few years. Then came The Can, a spot commissioned by Red Bull Austria, intended to be part of a program that Red Bull organized together with the University of Applied Arts Vienna. In 2009 he founded his own production company, DreamLife Studio SL, with the intention of starting to produce his own works on a larger scale. The company is based in Madrid and has produced and co-produced a myriad of international projects, both artistic and commercial.

Lascano's success quickly escalated and soon he found himself participating at the Zacuto's Emmy award-winning web series The Great Camera Shootout in Chicago and being invited by Vimeo to participate as a judge for the Animation Category of their first festival, Vimeo Festival + Awards, held in New York on October 9, 2010, together with other award-winning filmmakers such as David Lynch, Nicolas Schmerkin and Vincent Laforet.

In 2011 he was commissioned by Amnesty International to write, direct and coproduce an animated spot for their 50th anniversary. The original score was composed by the Academy Award winner Hans Zimmer and the Academy Award Nominee Lorne Balfe. The spot was internationally released by Amnesty International on May 28 th, 2011, on the day its 50th anniversary was commemorated. Furthermore, the spot has been featured at U2's website.

Also in 2011, Carlos released one of his most ambitious projects: a mixed-technique animation short film, A Shadow of Blue, in which he developed a novel technique of adding real eyes to 3D animated characters. The film later qualified for the 84th Academy Awards.

Later that year, captivated by the real-eyes technique, The Coca-Cola Company summoned Carlos to direct the official animated commercial spot the brand presented at the 2012 Eurocup. In 2014, his latest short film Lila saw the light, and by the first half of 2015 it had achieve over one hundred selections and over 30 awards in festivals from around the world. Its charming character and the impeccable combination of live action and animation has also made the short film become an instant Staff Pick video at Vimeo with over 1,500,000 views in the first year. It has also been screened through the Starbucks Digital Network in every Starbucks store in the US during the length of the 2015 Seattle International Film Festival.

Carlos' current activity is divided between the creation of audiovisual projects (both personal and commercial), and an extensive agenda of conferences, courses and seminaries, like the ones he gave in Bogotá (Colombia) in 2014, Vologda and Moscow (Russia) in 2012 and 2013, Vienna (Austria) in 2012, etc.

Owner of a very personal style, his mixing of digital tools and real objects brought a new organic aesthetic concept to animation, making Carlos achieve international recognition and setting him on the sight of large advertisement companies.

== Real-eyes technique ==
One of Lascano's most characteristic features is the use of a personally-developed technique in which real eyes are added to animation characters. This feature is present in many of his works (A Shadow of Blue, Spirit of the Euro, Red Bull's The Can, etc.) and is considered among his followers as a trademark of his work.

== Filmography: films and short films ==
- Pulitzer (1997)
- Marionettes (1998)
- Le Peintre et la Modéle (1998)
- Pandemonium (2000)
- Les Amants (2000)
- Juego Perverso (2001)
- La Leyenda del Espantapájaros (Legend of the Scarecrow) (2005)
- Inspiration (2005)
- A Short Love Story in Stop Motion (2008)
- A Shadow of Blue (2011)
- Lila (2014)
- The Puppeteer / El Marionetista (2017)
- All Roses for Lola / Todas as rosas são para Lola (2018)

== Advertisements, music videos and campaigns ==
- Esta ronda la paga Obus (featuring Javier Bardem) (2003)
- Red Bull's "The Can" (2008)
- Al Balad Campaign (Gandhi, Napoleon, Beethoven) (2008)
- Oscillococcinum "Le Bus" (2009)
- Popsicle Ice Pops "Space Camp" (2010)
- J'ai pas le temps (Gabi) (2010)
- TetraPak "The Cow" (2010)
- Standing up for Freedom: Amnesty International's 50th Anniversary (2011)
- The Spirit of the Euro (2012)
- JP-IK (2014)
- Playerito (Salomar) (2014)
- Valfrutta Triangolini (2015)
- CIF - Alice in Wonderland (2016)
- Columbus Zoo - Wildlights (2016)
- Cadbury Lickables (2017)
