= Dennis Nyback =

American film archivist (1953–2022)

- Born: July 30, 1953; Yacolt, Washington
- Died: October 2, 2022 (aged 69); Portland, Oregon
- Occupations: Film archivist, filmmaker, historian

Dennis Nyback (July 30, 1953 – October 2, 2022) was an American independent film archivist, found footage filmmaker, historian and writer.

Nyback operated the Dennis Nyback Film Archive, which has over 13,000 short films, from 1895 onward, mostly in 16mm. It is located in Portland, Oregon. Working from his archive he created over 300 found footage film programs that he showed extensively in Europe, Great Britain, Scandinavia and the United States He was a guest at film festivals in: Finland, France, Germany, Iceland, Norway, South Korea, Switzerland, the United States, and other countries. He owned and operated movie theaters in Seattle, New York and Portland, Oregon.

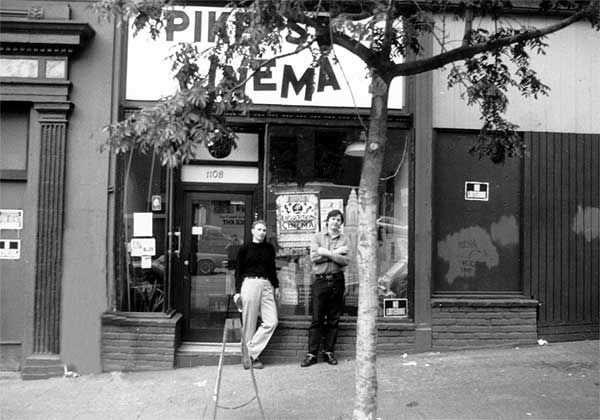
Dennis Nyback (left) and Jack Stevenson in 1993.

Every autumn since 2014 he gave a walking tour of the former movie palace and nickelodeon sites in downtown Portland as part of the Portland Film Festival.

== Found footage film programs ==
Dennis Nyback's most famous film program was "Bad Bugs Bunny: The Dark Side of Warner Bros. Animation" which he premiered at the Pike Street Cinema on January 15, 1993 for a three night run. He brought it back for a two-week run in March 1993. He took the program to Europe in 1995 where he showed it in 15 cities. It showed in England in 1996 with a London showing being the inspiration for the book Reading the Rabbit. It also showed in several cities in Australia in 1997 including a screening at the first Revelation Perth International Film Festival. He took it to Europe again in 2005 for screenings in 14 cities. In 2007, it was featured at the Hole in the Head Film Festival in San Francisco at the Roxy Theater where it sold out several shows. In 2009, it was featured at the KLIK Animation Festival, Amsterdam and sold out the Loft Cinema in Tucson, Arizona.

Some of his other programs that have played the United States and Europe are: "F&#k Mickey Mouse", "The Mormon Church Explains it All to You", "The Effect of Dada and Surrealism on Hollywood Movies of the 1930s", "Billie Holiday From First to Last", "Food: Is it for You?, Harlem in the Thirties", "I Know Why You're Afraid, Terrorism Light and Dark", and many others. For a jazz festival in Copenhagen, Denmark in 2000 he created ten feature length jazz film programs.

== Film tours in Europe and film festival appearances ==
Nyback first took films to Europe in March 1995 bringing the program "Bad Bugs Bunny" in 16mm and the feature film The Meatrack and She Devils on Wheels in 35mm. "Bad Bugs Bunny" was shown in: Amsterdam, Groningen, Eindhoven, Kortrijk, Den Haag, Nijmegen, Rotterdam, Utrecht, Osnabruck, Munich, Arhus, and Copenhagen. It was also screened at the Interfilm Festival in Berlin, and the Underdog Animation Festival in Oslo.

In April 1996, he toured Europe screening "Sex, Jazz and War Cartoons" and "The Fabulous Animation of Ladislas Starevich". The programs were shown at the International Trick Film Festival in Stuttgart, and in: Munich, Nuremberg, Osnabruck, Amsterdam, Groningen, Nijmegen, Arhus, Copenhagen, Hamburg, Halle and Lille. The programs were also screened at the Interfilm Festival in Berlin in May. and "Sex, Jazz and War Cartoons" was screened at the Underdog Festival in Oslo.

In November 1997, he was a guest at the KinoFilm Manchester Short Film Festival and he appeared at the Trickfilm Festival in Stuttgart in April 1998 where he showed "The Busby Berkeley Cartoon Show," "The Birth of Betty Boop: Or My Life as a Dog," and "F&#k Mickey Mouse" He remained in Europe showing the three programs in: Freiburg, Karlsruh, Munich, Hamburg, Paris, Bordeaux, Antwerp, Amsterdam, Copenhagen, Goteborg and Viborg. He was a guest at the Interfilm Festival in Berlin in December 1998.

In January 1999, Nyback was a guest at the International Film Festival, Reykjavik, Iceland, with a soft core sex program. In March 1999, the European tour featured the programs "The Effect of Dada and Surrealism" and "The Naughty to Nasty Sex Cartoon Extravaganza". The films were shown: in Munich, Freiburg, Nuremberg, Hamburg, Munster, Oslo, Bergen, Malmo, Arhus, Colmar, Bordeaux, Grenoble, and Paris. The film shows in Paris were on the Batofar, a former fire boat converted into a night club, moored on the Seine at 11 quai F.Mauriac Paris 13 ° – M: National Library / Wharf Station. He appeared at the Minimalen Festival, Trondheim, Norway, in March with the program "The Effect of Dada and Surrealism on Hollywood Movies of the 1930s". In July he appeared at the All Night Experimental Film Festival, The First World, New York City, with films made by the Mormon Church.

In 2000, he was a juror at the KinoFilm Manchester Short Film Festival in October and November and presented three programs: "Black Experience USA the 1960s", "Black Jazz and Dance" and "The Blaxploitation Cartoon Special".

Nyback took films to Europe in spring 2001 ("The Truth About the Disco Decade", "Kill a Commie for Christ") with showings in: Leuven, Osnabruck, Kiel, Copenhagen, Leipzig, Cologne, Groningen, Kortrijk, Munich, and Nuremberg. He was a member of the jury for the 17th Interfilm Festival in Berlin in November 2001 and he also showed "The Truth About the Disco Decade."

In 2002, the programs for Europe were "Smoking, Drinking and Sex" and "Cartoons Not Intended for Laughs" with screenings in: Cologne, Bamberg, Nuremberg, Leipzig, Arhus, Kiel, and Stuttgart in April and May. He was a guest at the Exground Filmfest, Wiesbaden, Germany, in November.

Nyback was commissioned by Johannes Schönherr to create "The Open Road: The Myth and Reality of the American Dream" for Europe in 2003. It was shown in: Kortrijk, Belgium; Osnabruck, Nuremberg, Leipzig, Cologne (Germany) and, Copenhagen and Arhus (Denmark). "The Open Road" was also selected by the PiFan 2003 festival (The 7th Puchon International Film Festival) in Korea and was screened by Nyback in July 2003. At PiFan he also screened "The Blaxploitation Cartoon Special" and "Hillbillies in Hollywood."

The films screened in Europe in 2004 were: "Europe Through American Eyes," "Cartoons Too Violent for Children," and "The Funny Funny Forgotten Men." The screenings in France were in: Bordeaux, Montpelier, Portiers, and Saint Etienne. In Germany they were shown in: Bordersholm, Cologne, Kiel, and Nuremberg. There were also screenings in Arhus and Oslo. During that same tour, he was a guest at Cherry Blossom Festival Japanische in Hamburg presenting a program of WWII anti-Japanese War Cartoons.

He was a juror at the KLIK Animation Festival, Amsterdam, Netherlands, in September 2009.

In March 2011, he was a guest at the Tampere Film Festival, Tampere, Finland, screening "Good Intentions" "The Effect of Dada and Surrealism on Hollywood Movies of the 1930s" "The Age of Oil" and "Kill a Commie for Christ.". He was also a guest at the Winterthur Short Film Festival, Switzerland, 11/7–11/11 2013. Additional screenings were held in: Copenhagen, Kiel, Lausanne, Bern, Hamburg, and Freiberg and in England in: Manchester, Lancashire, and Bolton.

In November 2013, Nyback was a guest at the Winterthur Film Festival in Zurich, Switzerland where his film "Goodbye Mommie (I'm Off to Kill a Commie)" was screened. There were also screenings in Bern, Brussels, Copenhagen, Kiel, and Nuremberg.

== Rose Bud Movie Palace ==
Nyback purchased the Rose Bud Movie Palace in Seattle in 1979. The Rosebud was dedicated to showing films from Hollywood's Golden Age. Part of that mandate included showing newsreels, cartoons and short subjects before feature films. It was then that he began purchasing short films to precede the features. The Rosebud Movie Palace closed on August 31, 1981. During the last month, one and two night runs of classic films were screened under the heading of "The Greatest Movies Never Shown" including silent films: The Black Pirate (1926), Blood and Sand (1992) Kriemhild's Revenge (1924), The Cat and the Canary (1927), Hearts of the World (1918), The Joyless Street (1925), and The Marriage Circle (1924). The last film was Sullivan's Travels (1941) on August 29–30.

== Jewel Box Theater ==
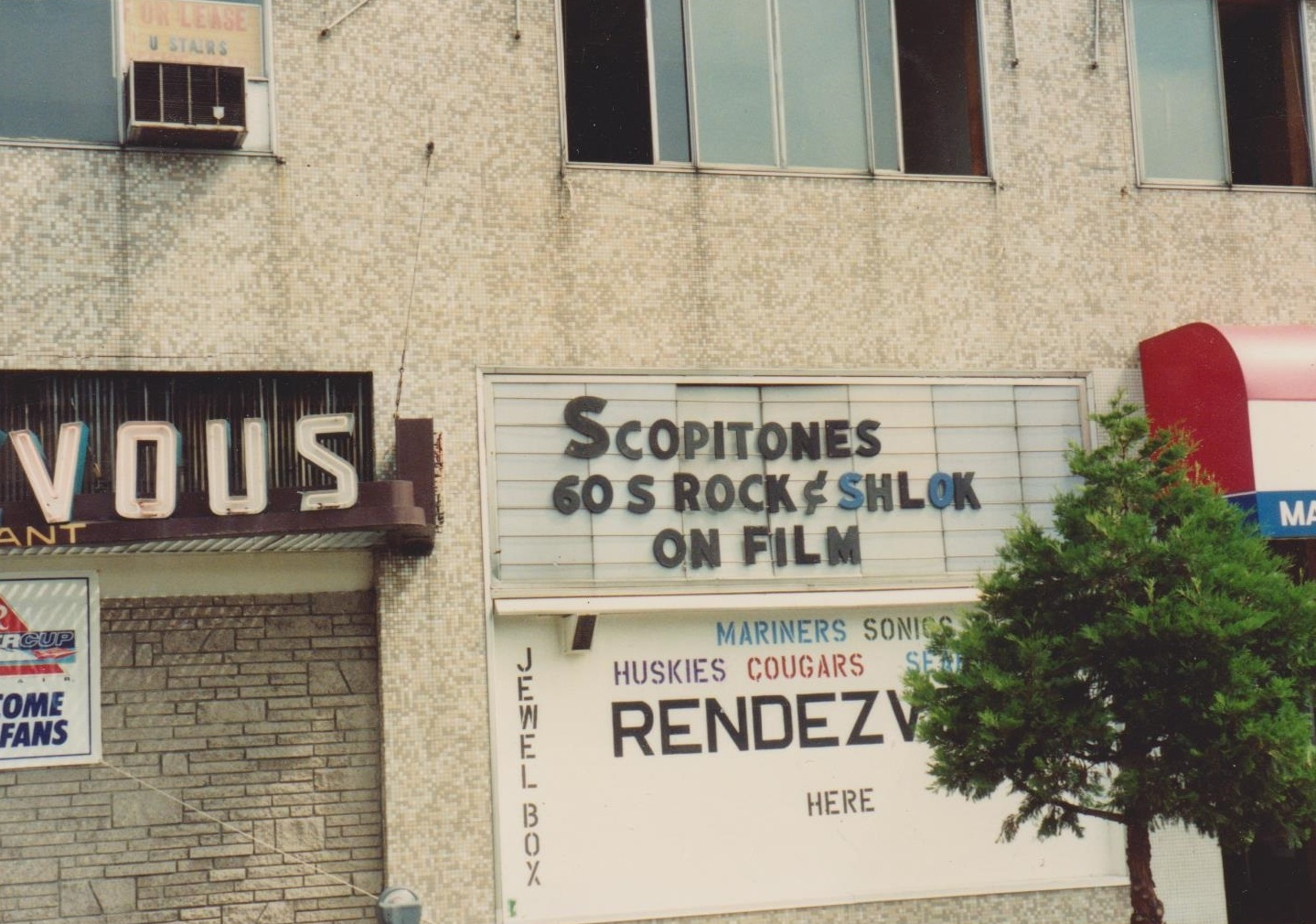
Jewelbox Scopitones 1990

In 1990, a selection of Scopitones was screened at the Jewel Box theater in Seattle by Dennis Nyback. In 1989 he began a four-year run showing films every Tuesday (and occasionally other nights) at the Jewel Box Theater in Seattle. The screenings were held under the umbrella term "The Belltown Film Festival." During that time he created programs on Burlesque, Tin Pan Alley Songwriters, Blues Music. One eight week series was called "A History of the World in 400 Minutes". In answer to the Gulf War he created the program "War: Is it for You?" In the early summer of 1990, Jack Stevenson arrived in Seattle from Boston having driven cross country with the trunk of his car filled with films. Nyback booked him into the Jewel Box for three days in August; with an extra fourth night being a free outdoor show to precede the Jewel Box shows. The urban drive-in occurred across the street from the Jewel Box in the parking lot of the Plumbers Union building. The wall of the plumber's building became the screen. A projector was set up on the rooftop across the parking lot and two feature films were shown: Viva Las Vegas (1964) and Hells Angels on Wheels (1967). Those in attendance were either in cars or on lawn chairs. Police did not disrupt the screening. In his year-end 1990 wrap up of film events in Seattle, William Arnold gave the Belltown Film Festival the award for "Most Consistently Daring Film Programs."

Jack Stevenson arranged for Nyback to come to Boston in the spring of 1991 to show films at The Primal Plunge, The Somerville Theater, and the Coolidge Corner Theater. Stevenson returned to Seattle in the summer of 1991 for more shows at the Jewel Box. Around Christmas 1991 all of Nyback's projection equipment was stolen from the Jewel Box projection booth. That coincided with the owner of the Rendezvous accepting a better financial offer to host film shows in the Jewel Box. To honor previously booked films the Belltown Film Festival moved across the street to Occupied Seattle for further screenings.

== Pike street cinema ==
In 1992 Nyback opened the Pike Street Cinema in Seattle in partnership with Elizabeth Rozier. The theater was created in a storefront at 1108 Pike Street. The empty space was chosen because it had a loft at the back and the rent was cheap. The biggest expense was building a wall a third of the way into the space. That created the auditorium in back of it with the lobby in front. A 10 foot wide screen was hung on the new wall. 16mm and 35mm projectors were placed in the loft. Seats were placed between.

The Pike Street Cinema showed a mix of Dennis Nyback productions, new independent feature films, silent features, and revival feature films. It was also a home for various film groups to have regular events. They included the Backtrack Cinema Society hosted by Fred Hopkins, Cinema Experimento hosted by Jon Behrens, and ISC (Independent Short Cinema) hosted by Galen Young, Scott Castle, and William Isenberger. The ISC showcased works by independent filmmakers (in 16mm and 35mm) including Sarah Jacobson. Yau Ching, Bob Hutchinson and others. The ISC also brought in Bruce Baillie for a personal appearance that included screening Castro Street, All My Life and other Baillie films. Most notably the Backtrack Cinema Society brought in Sam Andrew of Big Brother and Holding Company for a personal appearance. In 1993 Nyback drove to Cleveland to see a baseball game at Cleveland Municipal Stadium which the Indians would vacate at the end of the year. To finance that trip he showed films in Detroit while Johannes Schönherr came to Seattle to run the Pike Street Cinema while Nyback was gone.

Among revival films screened was the curious 1975 Seattle production The Last Bath. Two storefronts down from the Pike Street Cinema was a tattoo parlor which sponsored a revival of The Illustrated Man starring Rod Steiger on a double feature with the film noir The Tattooed Stranger. Anyone who showed a tattoo got a dollar off at the door. Also revived were a series of Frederick Wiseman documentary films including Titicut Follies, High School, Law and Order, Meat, and Primate. The film "Sparkles Tavern" had its Seattle premiere at the Pike St. in October 1992. The world premiere of Sparkle's Tavern had been scheduled for the 1984 Seattle International Film Festival with Curt McDowell, George Kuchar and Marion Eaton in person. At the time of the screening no complete print was ready. The screening was attempted with a and B unmarried rolls projected with an interlock system. It failed with refunds given to the full house crowd.

Silent Films at the Pike Street Cinema were often accompanied by Lori Goldston. Those included Spies by Fritz Lang (2/21/93), The Blot by Lois Weber (April 17, 1994), The Penalty with Lon Chaney (March 16, 1995), Leaves from Satan's Book directed by Carl Dreyer (3/20-21/95), He Who Gets Slapped starring Lon Chaney (March 23, 1995),The Passion of Joan of Arc directed by Carl Dreyer (March 27, 1995), The Blackbird starring Lon Chaney (March 30, 1995), Vampyr directed by Carl Dreyer (April 3–4, 1995), and Where East is East starring Lon Chaney (April 13, 1995).

In 1995 Nyback dismantled the theater, loaded it into a truck, and drove it to New York. He used the screen, seats, projectors etc. to open the Lighthouse Cinema. In 2002, in The Seattle Stranger 's ten-year anniversary issue, in an article entitled "Top 10 Great Film Events" Sean Nelson listed the closing of the Pike Street Cinema as the number 3 event

== Lighthouse Cinema ==
The Lighthouse Cinema, at 116 Suffolk Street, at Rivington, on the Lower East Side of New York opened in the early winter of 1996. Nyback reused the projectors, screen, and seats from the Pike Street Cinema. He was assisted by Johannes Schonherr who ran the theater while Nyback was showing films in Europe in spring 1996.

Between February 8–16, 1996, Takahiko Iimura appeared in person with his films.

June 12 through the 20th, 1996 saw the first major retrospective of the works of George and Mike Kuchar with an eight-day festival showing every film available, forty titles in 8mm and 16mm, from the Filmmakers Co-op. The opening night featured a book release party hosted by Creation Books for Jack Stevenson's first book Desperate Visions: The Films of John Waters & the Kuchar Brothers. Appearing on opening night were George and Mike Kuchar, Jack Stevenson, Taylor Mead, Richard Kern, Todd Phillips, Tessa Hughes-Freeland, Nick Zedd, and various people who had been involved in the Kuchar films from the early days.

Mike Wallace and his wife came to the May 31, 1996 screening of the 1967 CBS Special Report: The Homosexuals and answered questions after the screening.

The Lighthouse was mentioned in publications such as New York Magazine which reported on The Mormon Church Explains it All to You and also The Give Me Liberty Summer of Love Movie Festival. The New York Times reviewed the feature film Highway of Heartache. There was a feature article titled "To the Lighthouse" in The Village Voice. The New York Native ran an article entitled: "Welcome to the Lighthouse: Where Mormon Propaganda Movies Meet Battleship Potemkin and Wild in the Streets". It mentioned The Mormon Church Explains it All to You, The Give Me Liberty Psychedelic Summer Anything Goes Films Festival, Marsha Brady Fetish Night, and others. It concluded: "At the time when your local fourplex is probably playing Mission Impossible on all its screens, with shows starting every half-hour, Lighthouse Cinema is the kind of movie house New York needs". At about that time, offered a deal by his landlord Mark Glass, Nyback accepted a buyout to vacate the theater and closed it. In 1997 The New York Times reported that the landlord Mark Glass had been arrested for attempted murder and arson against tenants of his building who did not accept payout offers to leave.

== Independent in New York ==
After closing the Lighthouse Cinema, Nyback remained in New York partially supporting himself by screening independent films shows. His program "Screw the Mouse: Ripoffs, Parodies and Deviant Versions of Disney Cartoons and Characters" ran for one week at the Cinema Village, on East 12th Street, in Manhattan, from January 3 to 10. From January 15 to February 19, 1997, he had a six-week screening every Wednesday at the Cinema Village. Patricia Thompson reported on it:

....Nyback's eclectic series offers some true rarities, like the patently racist jazz films (1/22) in which Duke Ellington, Bessie Smith, Cab Calloway and other jazz greats not only play, but act. The series then jumps to cross-dressing clips(1/29) existential educational films from the gray-flannel '50s (2/5), '60s vision of the year 2000 (2/12), and cigarette and beer ads (2/19). Nyback will be on hand to introduce his quirky fare, which alone should be worth the price of admission.

Bad Bugs Bunny remained in England with a screening at the Harbor Lights Cinema, in Southampton in February 1997. His next engagement at the Cinema Village was Scopitone A Go Go, in April 1997. MTV transferred the program to videotape and Michael Shore interviewed Nyback for a news item that played on MTV news. At the Grand Illusion Cinema in Seattle, in June and July, he ran 32 nights of silent films. He was at the Clinton Street Theater in the fall and showed films in San Francisco at the Minna Street Gallery before flying to Manchester, England to be guest at the KinoFilm Festival in November. He returned to San Francisco for shows at the Minna Street Gallery between Christmas and New Years.

In February and March 1998 he had a weekly film series at the Cinema Village. He showed films in Europe April and May; his first summer west coast shows were at the Minna Street Gallery in June. He did a program of films featuring barber shops at the Wedig Blues Barber Shop in Seattle on July 25, and had engagements at the Clinton Street Theater in August and November. He was a guest at the Interfilm Short Film Festival in Berlin in December.

Nyback was a guest at the International Film Festival, Reykjavik, Iceland, in January 1999. He showed films at The Collective:Unconscious in February and April, and in June showed films at the Clinton Street Theater in Portland. He did another silent film series in Seattle at the Grand Illusion Cinema in June. In Seattle he made a deal with Anne Rozier to take over the Clinton Street Theater in Portland. His last independent New York shows were at The First World, New York City, All Night Experimental Film Festival and a Scopitone show at Rubulad, Williamsburg, Brooklyn, in July.

== Clinton Street Theater ==
In September 1999 he moved to Portland, Oregon to take over the Clinton Street Theater During his time operating it with Anne Rozier, the theater showed a mix of new and revival films, as well as Nyback's creations using his archive. His shows included: "Defining the 1970s Through Classic Commercials","Bad Bugs Bunny", "Strange and Surreal Industrial Films", "F&#k Mickey Mouse", "Scopitone a Go Go", "Jazz on Film", "The Dark Side of Dr. Seuss", "Forty Years of Classic Commercials", and "The Genius of Bob Clampett".

In July 2000 he produced a monthlong festival of blaxploitation films. In The Oregonian review Shawn Levy wrote:

Some things you're lucky just to be around for. Take the month long celebration of African American cinema at the Clinton Street Theater. Availing himself of his remarkable archive of films, Clinton co-owner Dennis Nyback has put together a string of films an earnest person could use as the basis of a book: documentaries, rare bits of TV programming, Hollywood features, films made for the all-black market, silent movies, footage of the likes of Billie Holiday and the Nicholas brothers – a true cinematic panoply of the black experience of the 20th century.

== Jazz Singer ==
Nyback sang with the John Holte Swing Band in 1979 and 1980. He also sang with various small bands in many Seattle taverns being backed by Ham Carson, John Draper, Buck Evans and other jazz musicians, doing primarily Twenties and Thirties material. Nyback sang one song, Them There Eyes, in his cabaret show Can't We Be Friends: The Women of Tin Pan Alley, that played in Seattle for two weeks in 1993. The show was performed by Nora Michaels, who asked Nyback to do the one song so the audience could see who created the show. The pianist for the show was Jack Brownlow. In New York Nyback sits in and sings with Vince Giordano and His Nighthawks Orchestra.

== Radio host ==
Nyback, under the pseudonym of "Buck Dollars, the Man with no Musical Sense," hosted the show "Vintage Jazz" on KBCS 91.3FM, Bellevue Community College, every Thursday from 9:30AM to noon, from early 1989 to early 1992. The station director there when he started was Harriet Baskas. In Portland he has hosted shows on KBOO 90.7FM including The Outside World and Radio Lost and Found as well as appearing frequently on The Film Show and The Monday Sampler.

== Art and installations ==
In Seattle, Washington in November 1994, Nyback created an installation using three 16mm projectors providing images on walls and the ceiling at oblique angles in an industrial setting for the Northwest Institute for Architecture and Urban Studies gala event "Fantasmi di Fellini". In New York in 2005, he created an installation involving back projection onto a scrim curtain to be viewed as spectral images from the sidewalk outside a storefront on W 37th Street as the first event of the Chashama "The False Body" series curated by Alice Reagan. In 2006 in Portland, Nyback teamed with Mack McFarland on the PICA TBA artist with the project the Portland That Was. It consisted of an interactive website portlandwas.com and the staging of three outdoor film screenings in three different public spaces along the Willamette River. The culmination of the TBA event was the "All Night Long Film Caravan" where Nyback projected films on the outside of downtown Portland buildings that were related to historic events of the past in that site specific place. The films were projected in 16mm with sound; all equipment was transported between sites on bicycles. In March 2011, in Kiel, Germany Nyback worked with the Film Group Chaos and Karsten Weber to create an installation using three 16mm projectors, three 8mm projectors, and three slide projectors, situated on, and among, disabled water works machinery for the Filmfest Schleswig-Holstein Augenweide.

== Motion picture projectionist ==
Nyback was hired to be a projectionist at The Movie House theater in Seattle, by Randy Finley in 1973 while he was student at the University of Washington allowing him to work his way through college. In 1975 he was hired as a projectionist at the Moore Egyptian Theater in Seattle by Dan Ireland. In 1976 he was the lead projectionist for the first Seattle International Film Festival at the Moore Egyptian. During the third Seattle International Film Festival, in the Spring of 1978, he ran every screening. That same year he became a member of the Seattle Projectionist Union I.A.T.S.E. #154. One of his first union jobs was at the Green Parrot Theater. He worked through the projectionist union until 1993.

== Education ==
At the University of Washington he studied short story writing with Jack Cady, play writing with David Wagoner, psychology with Elizabeth Loftus and dance with Ruthanna Boris and Tommy Rall. He finished his college education in 1978 with a BA in Psychology.

== Historian and writer ==
Nyback wrote, produced and directed the cabaret musical Can't We be Friends in Seattle in 1993 which played in May and June, starring Nora Michaels, featuring the pianist Jack Brownlow. Can't We be Friends was the inspiration for the PBS special American Masters Yours for a Song: The Women of Tin Pan Alley (1999). His memoir "Seattle Art and Grind" about events at Seattle movie theaters is in the book From the Arthouse to the Grind House. His six panel cartoon about the life and career of Rudy Vallée "The Man with the Megaphone" was first published in WFMU's magazine Lowest Common Denominator in 1999 and reprinted in The Best of LCD:The Art and Writing of WFMU-FM 91.1 FM in 2007. He contributed articles to Otherzine from 2000 to 2006 including: "The Rat in the Popcorn", "Europe on 99 Pfennings a Day", "A Reel of Fire" and "Hollywood Garbage and How to Smell It". He booked the films; Shakespeare Wallah, The Lusty Men, Talk Radio, Smoke Signals, A Soldier's Story, Marked Woman, and with the Oregon Cartoon Institute, arranged for Bill Plympton to appear, for the 2009 Sesquicentennial Film Festival at Marylhurst University; as well as overseeing the installation of a 35mm projection booth for the festival. His radio play Ten Cents a Dance was performed on stage at the Clinton Street Theater in April 2013 and broadcast live by remote on KBOO FM Radio. His book musical play The Past is Calling was performed on stage as part of the 2014 Portland Fertile Ground Festival. From March 2012 to 2015 he reviewed stage plays in Portland for Portland Stage Reviews.

His musical radio play Calvin Coolidge Goes Crazy was performed live on the stage of the Clinton St. Theater as a benefit for KBOO Radio on November 10, 2016, and live on the air from the KBOO studio on March 23, 2017.

== Educator ==
Nyback taught at Portland State University (Hollywood Does the Cakewalk, 2001), the NW Film Center School of Film (Not for the Faint of Heart: A History of Avant Garde Filmmaking, 2001) and Marylhurst University (Social History Through Animation, 2008). He presented a paper at the Washington Women's History Consortium, 2011 "Miss Lee Morse: Pioneer of Pop." At the conference his presentation included him showing 16mm films on three projectors. Once asked the length of one of his film shows, he replied that all of them are "Entertaining, educational, and 90 minutes long."

== Death ==
Nyback died after a long battle with cancer at his home in Portland, Oregon, on October 2, 2022, at the age of 69.
