= Heyser =

Heyser is a surname. Notable people with the surname include:

- Friedrich Heyser (1857–1921), German painter
- Kurt Heyser (1894–1974), German general
- Norma Heyser (born 1933), American contemporary artist
- Richard S. Heyser (1927–2008), United States Air Force pilot
