= Oregon Cartoon Institute =

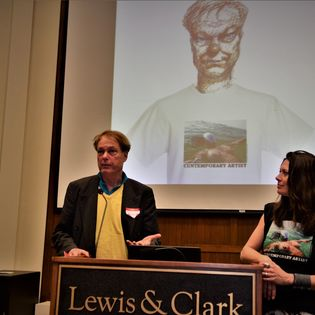
Bill Plympton and Marne Lucas at the 2019 OCI Invitational at Lewis and Clark College

The Oregon Cartoon Institute is located in Portland, Oregon. It was founded in 2007 by Anne Elizabeth Richardson, dedicated to raising awareness of Oregon's rich animation and cartooning history. The OCI has produced projects on Mel Blanc, Harry Smith, Robert Crumb, James Ivory, Pinto Colvig, Lew C. Cook, James Blue, Joan Gratz, Homer Groening, and others. Anne Richardson died on October 14, 2020. The current board is chaired by Katherine Richardson. Members of the board are Laura Berg, Sebastian Heiduschke, Kira Lesley and Ellen Thomas.

== Recent events ==
The OCI hosted its 6th Annual Oregon Film History Conference on Friday Nov. 20, 2020. Due to Covid, it was first online event the OCI has hosted. The focus of the conference was the work of animator Joan Gratz.

The 2019 conference was held at Lewis and Clark College on May 3. Bill Plympton was featured.

On October 15, 2016 OCI produced Underground USA, a one-day public history/arts education event focussing on one chapter of Oregon print cartooning history. Six writers and artists who worked for Portland's underground press met to discuss the impact of that experience on their sensibilities and careers. Filmmaker Bill Plympton, graphic novelist David Chelsea, journalist Norman Solomon, critic Richard Gehr, and historian Maurice Isserman all began at the underground newspaper the Portland Scribe and went on to comics friendly careers. Patrick Rosenkranz, author of Rebel Visions: The Underground Comix Revolution 1963-1975, gave the keynote address.

On May 4, 2015 The OCI took part in the 2015 Northwest Animation Festival with an "Oregon Animation History" show on May 4 at the Hollywood Theatre. Cartoons made by Oregonians (including Bill Plympton, Joanna Priestley, Rose Bond, Joan Gratz, and others) were screened in both 16mm and 35mm. All films were from the Dennis Nyback Film Archive. Preceding the films was a lecture on the history of Oregon Animation by Anne Richardson.

== Oregon Film History Invitational ==
On May 8, 2015, Anne Richardson produced the first symposium on Oregon film making. The Oregon Film History Invitational took place at the Little Church on 5138 NE 23rd Ave in Portland from 9:00am to 4:00pm. Presentations were made, in order of their appearance, by Gary Lacher and Steve Stone, authors of Theatres of Portland (Images of America), on Portland Theater history; Ben Truwe, Southern Oregon Historical Society, on animation pioneer Pinto Colvig; Filmmaker/inventor Walt Dimick, on one of Portland's first full-time film entrepreneurs Norm Dimick; Dennis Nyback, on three Oregon musicians, Lee Morse, George Olsen and Del Porter, who appeared in early sound films; Anne Richardson, on Oregon film makers James Blue and James Ivory; Sheldon Renan and Brooke Jacobson, on the creation and early days of the Northwest Film Center; Filmmakers Richard Blakeslee Tom Chamberlin, on how the Teknifilm Lab nurtured the return of Portland independent film making, Research librarian Libby Burke, on Elmer Buehler, the man who was responsible for saving Woody Guthrie films the Bonneville Power Administration produced in the 1940s. Libby also gave DVD's of the BPA films to all in attendance at the conference.

The second Oregon Film History Invitational was held at the Little Church on May 13, 2016. Presentations were made by, in order of their appearance, Larry Telles/Ranch Girl On A Rampage: Helen Gibson, Hollywood's first professional stuntwoman, performs in the 1913 Pendleton Round Up, Dennis Nyback/B. F. Shearer & Portland's Film Row: Hollywood's distribution infrastructure on NW 19th, which supported an analog media empire, includes a perfectly miniaturized showcase theater designed by Seattle-based B. F. Shearer, Patrick Rosenkranz/Carl Barks: The Oregon comic book auteur who invented Uncle Scrooge McDuck and inspired Robert Crumb, Libby Burke, librarian & archivist/Citizen Kahn: Stephen B. Kahn at BPA, Harry Dawson/About his decades long collaboration with artist Bill Viola, Richard Blue/Gives an update on the international search for the lost negative of James Blue's THE OLIVE TREES OF JUSTICE (1962), and Mike Richardson/About the transition he made from publisher to producer with DR. GIGGLES in 1992.

On May 5, 2017 OCI produced the third Oregon Film History Invitational. The conference took place at the Little Church on 5138 NE 23rd Ave in Portland from 9:00am to 4:00pm. Presentations were given by, in order of their appearance, Ronald Kramer/KGW Hoot Owls (1923-1933), Elizabeth Peterson/Lester Beck, UO’30, Gretchen Harmon/William B. Gruber, inventor of Viewmaster, David Chelsea/At the Scribe (1972-1978), Julie Perini/Using OHS Moving Image Archives, and David Cress/MHCC film school.

The fourth invitational was on May 4, 2018 at the University of Oregon, downtown Portland. The climax of the event was a conversation between Randy Finley and Wil Vinton, explaining why, for many years, the Oscar for Closed Mondays was in the possession of Randy in Seattle.

== Cartoon Extravaganza ==
The first Oregon Cartoon Institute project was the "Cartoon Extravaganza: 21 Days & 21 Nights of Rare 16mm Animation," Feb. 23 – March 15, 2007 at Disjecta. In addition to nightly 16mm film screenings the OCI brought in Marilyn Zornado to talk about her place in the early days of the Will Vinton Studio, Melissa Marsland to introduce a program of films by Jim Blashfield, Sven Bonnichsen to introduce a program of stop motion animation, and Rose Bond to introduce her own work.

== Platform Animation Festival ==
Also in 2007 the OCI had Dennis Nyback cover the Platform Animation Festival as a reporter filing daily video reports. The reports featured Rose Bond, Jim Blashfield, Marcy Page of the National Film Board, Will Vinton, John Canemaker, Bill Plympton, and others.

== Oregon Sesquicentennial Film Festival ==
Anne Richardson was asked to create the Oregon Sesquicentennial Film Festival at Marylhurst University in 2009. The festival was a celebration of the history of Oregon film making. For the festival a 35mm projection booth was constructed at Marylhurst. The opening night of the festival was at the Mission Theater with an on stage conversation between James Ivory and Gus Van Sant. The films shown at Marylhurst included Smoke Signals with director Chris Eyre in person; Marked Woman featuring Mayo Methot; Talk Radio with writer Tad Savinar in person; The Lusty Men (set in and partially shot at the Pendleton Round-up); City Girl by F.W. Murnau, shot on location in Athena, Oregon (with a score composed by John Paul and performed by a string quartet; A Soldier's Tale by Penny Allen, and James Ivory's first international hit film Shakespeare Wallah, with James Ivory in person. The special Oregon Cartoon Institute day at the festival featured Bill Plympton.

== R Crumb Carl Barks Basil Wolverton ==
In 2010, the OCI in partnership with Karl Lind Films produced a video featuring Patrick Rosenkranz and Charles Boucher, profiling the influence of two Oregon artists, Carl Barks and Basil Wolverton, on Robert Crumb. It was released during Portland Art Museum's 2010 exhibit of Robert Crumb's The Book Of Genesis exhibit.

== Mel Blanc Project ==
In June 2011 the OCI produced The Mel Blanc Project, a public history/arts education partnership between Oregon Cartoon Institute, Oregon Jewish Museum, Ethos Music Center, Oregon Historical Society and Portland State University’s School of Fine and Performing Arts. The project included a lecture series with eight guest lecturers in six events at three venues and an eight part film series. It also featured a walking tour of Mel Blanc's Portland neighborhood. Portland Mayor Sam Adams declared June 29, 2011 to be Mel Blanc Day. Funding came from the Kinsman Foundation and the Miller Foundation.

== Harry Smith PDX Project ==
In 2013 the OCI produced Harry Smith PDX, a public history/arts education project which included a panel discussion, an evening of films and a five-hour series of interactive presentations free to the public. May 16–19, 2013 in Portland featuring twelve guest speakers in three events at two venues. Included was the Harry Smith Seance at the Hollywood Theatre on May 16, 2013. The Seance included a screening of Harry's Heaven and Earth Magic in 16mm along with 35mm slides projected from two slide projectors in the tradition of Harry. All projection and effects were by Dennis Nyback. An original musical score was performed by Andrew Ritchey, Matt Carlson, and Jordan Dykstra. Speaking before the Seance were Sheldon Renan, Darrin Daniel and Rani Singh. Archaic technology preservationist Doug Stewart recorded the entire Seance on two Presto 6N recording lathes. Earlier in the day at the Hollywood Theatre on May 16 OCI produced "Harry Smith In The Pacific Northwest" a panel discussion with Gus Frederick, Rich Wandschneider and Michael Munk. On Sunday May 19, 2013 the OCI presented The Harry Smith Free For All at the Ace Hotel in Portland. It featured a lecture on Harry Smith's unpredictable relationship to the concept of 'truth" by Leo Daedulus, a musical performance by Joe McMurrian, Jessica Beer brought the Sacred Harp Singers, Kaveh Askari's experimental documentary film "Harry Smith of the Guide: Field Recordings and a Location" (2013), had its Portland premiere, Dennis Nyback talked about the detective work which preceded his re-creation of Harry Smith's multiple projector approach to Heaven And Earth Magic, and Doug Stewart gave a lecture and demonstration of portable recording processes in the pre-magnetic tape era.

== Pinto Colvig: From Jacksonville to Disney ==
On October 13, 2013 the OCI presented guest speaker Ben Truwe's lecture on Vance Debar “Pinto“ Colvig at Fifth Avenue Cinema, in partnership with Portland ASIFA Pinto Colvig was born in Jacksonville, Oregon in 1892. Pinto Colvig is most famous for being the voice of Goofy in Walt Disney cartoons and being the first Bozo the Clown.

In 2011 the movie "Adventures in Plymtoons" about Bill Plympton came out. In the movie Dennis Nyback appears telling the story of taking Bill and Anne Richardson on a walking tour of Jacksonville on April 10, 2009 in search of Pinto Colvig's boyhood house.

== Harry Comes Home ==
The OCI produced the Harry Comes Home Tour, bringing Harry Smith films to Bellingham in partnership with Western Washington University on November 5, 2013, to Seattle in partnership with Seattle International Film Festival Cinema on Mar 18, 2014. The Seattle screening of Heaven and Earth Magic featured a live score performed by Lori Goldston, Jessika Kenney and Suzie Kowzowa.

Anne Richardson, director of Oregon Cartoon Institute, presented a paper on Harry Smith: Salmon Nation Beatnik at the 2014 Society of Cinema & Media Studies conference.

== Mid Century Oregon Genius: A film and speaker screening series ==
Anne Richardson, Oregon Movies A to Z, and the OCI created the Mid Century Oregon Genius: A film + speaker screening series to honor four Oregon filmmakers who had major successes in the early 1960s. They were James Ivory, James Blue, Harry Smith and Homer Groening. The film screenings were divided into two parts and held at the Hollywood Theatre in Portland. Funding came from the Kinsman Foundation and the Miller Foundation.

The first weekend, October 10 and 11, 2014, featured James Ivory and James Blue. James Ivory appeared in person to present two films he had personally chosen from the dozens he had directed. On Friday October 10 the film was Maurice (1987) and on October 11 it was Autobiography of a Princess (1975). Mr. Ivory introduced both films to the audience. He was introduced on stage by Anne Richardson.

On October 11 The James Blue film The Olive Trees of Justice was introduced by Richard Blue of the James Blue Foundation. It was followed by a panel discussion on the career of James Blue. The panelists were Richard Blue, James Dormeyer and Gill Dennis.

The second Mid Century Oregon Genius screenings were at the Hollywood Theatre on January 16 and 17, 2015. On January 16 Harry Smith's "Heaven and Earth Magic" was screened. It was presented using three projectors operated by Dennis Nyback. The 16mm print was provided by The Film-Makers' Cooperative. Also on the bill was Drew Christie's "Some Crazy Magic: Meeting Harry Smith." The program began with a lecture about Harry by Eric Issacson. The screening was followed by a panel discussion. The panelists were Chuck Pirtle, Eric Issacson and Dennis Nyback.

On January 17 films by Homer Groening were screened. Homer Groening was a filmmaker active in Portland from the 1950s into the 1980s. The films were selected by Matt Groening and Lisa Groening. They were introduced to the crowd by Bill Plympton. Matt and Lisa also appeared on stage in a panel with Homer Groening's professional colleague Tom Shrader, and Groening friend and film critic Ted Mahar.
