= Autobiography of a Princess =

1975 film by James Ivory

- Directed by: James Ivory
- Written by: R. Prawer Jhabvala
- Produced by: Ismail Merchant
- Starring: James Mason; Madhur Jaffrey
- Cinematography: Walter Lassally
- Edited by: Humphrey Dixon
- Music by: Vic Flick
- Distributed by: Contemporary Films Ltd. (UK)
- Release date: 5 October 1975 (New York Film Festival)
- Running time: 60 minutes
- Country: India
- Language: English

Autobiography of a Princess is a 1975 film directed by James Ivory and starring James Mason and Madhur Jaffrey. It was written by Ruth Prawer Jhabvala and produced by Ismail Merchant.

== Plot ==
An Indian princess (Madhur Jaffrey), long-divorced and living in self-enforced exile in 1970s London, spends time with her father's ex-tutor, Cyril Sahib (James Mason), watching film footage of Royal India and talking of a past world. There is a great deal of fascinating real-life footage and interviews with India's royalty: the Maharajas of India and the end they faced due to the 1960s socialist reforms introduced by India's then Prime Minister Indira Gandhi.

== Revival ==
In 2014, the Oregon Cartoon Institute brought James Ivory to Portland, Oregon, to appear in person at the Hollywood Theatre, to present two films he had personally chosen from the dozens he had directed. On 11 October it was Autobiography of a Princess (1975), shown in 35mm. Mr. Ivory introduced the film to the audience.
