= Madeline DeFrees =

American poet

- Born: November 18, 1919; Ontario, Oregon
- Died: November 11, 2015 (aged 95); Portland, Oregon
- Website: madelinedefrees.com

Madeline DeFrees (also known as Sister Mary Gilbert; November 18, 1919 – November 11, 2015) was an American poet, teacher, and Roman Catholic nun.

== Biography ==
Born in Ontario, Oregon, Madeline DeFrees lived in Seattle, Washington. She joined the Sisters of the Holy Names of Jesus and Mary in 1936 and took the name Sister Mary Gilbert. She received her B.A. in English from Marylhurst College (now Marylhurst University) and an M.A. in Journalism from the University of Oregon. She reclaimed her baptismal name in 1967 when she went to teach at the University of Montana. While in Missoula, she requested a dispensation from her vows, which she received in 1973.

She taught at Holy Names College from 1950 to 1967, the University of Montana from 1967 to 1979, and the University of Massachusetts, Amherst from 1979 to 1985. After her retirement in 1985, DeFrees held residencies at Bucknell University, Eastern Washington University, and Wichita State University. She continued to write and teach until she was almost 90, joining the faculty of the Pacific University low-residency MFA program in Forest Grove, Oregon, and lecturing at the low-residency MFA program of the Northwest Institute of Literary Arts (Whidbey Writers Workshop) in January 2009.

DeFrees was the author of two chapbooks, two memoirs of convent life, and eight poetry collections, including Blue Dusk (Copper Canyon Press, 2001), which won the 2002 Lenore Marshall Poetry Prize and a Washington State Book Award for Poetry. She received a Guggenheim Fellowship in Poetry and a grant from the National Endowment for the Arts. Her final collection was Spectral Waves (Copper Canyon Press, 2006). Spectral Waves won a 2007 Washington State Book Award for Poetry. DeFrees died in Portland, Oregon, on November 11, 2015, at age 95.

== Bibliography ==
=== Poetry ===
- From the Darkroom, 1964
- When the Sky Lets Go, 1978
- Imaginary Ancestors (chapbook), 1978
- Magpie on the Gallows, 1982 (Copper Canyon Press)
- The Light Station on Tillamook Rock, 1990
- Imaginary Ancestors, 1990
- Possible Sibyls, 1991 (Lynx House Press)
- Double Dutch (chapbook), 1999
- Blue Dusk: New and Selected Poems, 1951-2001, 2001 (Copper Canyon Press)
- Spectral Waves, 2006 (Copper Canyon Press)
- Where the Horse Takes Wing: The Uncollected Poems of Madeline DeFrees, 2019 (Two Sylvias Press)

=== Prose ===
- Springs of Silence, 1953
- Later Thoughts from the Springs of Silence, 1962
- Subjective Geography: A Poet's Thoughts on Life and Craft, 2018 (Lynx House Press)
