= James Blue =

Filmmaker

- Born: October 10, 1930; Tulsa, Oklahoma
- Died: June 14, 1980 (aged 49); Buffalo, New York
- Education: University of Oregon
- Occupation: Filmmaker
- Years active: 1957–1980
- Spouse: Janice Chrabas Blue (m. 1968; div. 1977)

"James Blue" was also one of the many pseudonyms used by author Donald E. Westlake.

James Blue (October 10, 1930 in Tulsa, Oklahoma – June 14, 1980 in Buffalo, New York) was a filmmaker. As a student at the University of Oregon, Blue produced experimental 8 mm films, including a parody of Hamlet that gained local attention among students.

His most notable films were Les oliviers de la justice (literal English title The Olive Trees of Justice) (1962, US), A Few Notes on Our Food Problem (1968) and The March (1964). Les oliviers de la justice was given the Prix de la Société des Écrivains de Cinéma et de Télévision award (Critics Prize) at the 1962 Cannes Film Festival. A Few Notes on our Food Problem received an Academy Award nomination for best feature documentary. The March was added to the National Film Registry in 2008.

== Les oliviers de la justice ==
Les oliviers de la justice was based on "Les oliviers de la justice", a novel by Jean Pelegri. It was filmed in Algeria under war conditions during the Algerian War with a French production company. The musical score was composed by Maurice Jarre. At Cannes, it was shown out of competition in a sideline section of the festival dedicated to the work of promising young directors, the inaugural Semaine de la Critique and was given the Prix de la Société des Écrivains de Cinéma et Télévision au Festival de Cannes 1962. After Cannes, "Olive Trees" received rave reviews for its run in Paris. Cynthia Grenier for The New York Times wrote, under the sub-headline "Justice Triumphs, ""Olive Trees of Justice" a fiction feature made in Algeria against a backdrop of the Algerian conflict, provoked a rare unanimity, from the farthest right to the farthest left in the press, both as to the quality and the courage of the undertaking." In 1963 Olive Trees of Justice was shown in New York at the first New York Film Festival. It did not get a regular run until 1967 when it got a booking at the New Yorker Theater, as reported by Howard Thompson in The New York Times. Mr. Thompson wrote "The Olive Trees of Justice was photographed during the crucial days of 1962 in the heart of Algiers and in the vineyard countryside, with a cast of non-professionals under an American born director. James Blue, who previously made short films here and in France, and has recently worked for the United States Information Agency. Mr. Blue should certainly be making films somewhere." Blue was interviewed for Film Comment in 1963 by Mary Batten. He said about Olive Trees: “What I was trying to do in The Olive Trees was to avoid any kind of fabricated emotion. Of course, I’m not trying to say I didn’t want emotion in this film—that would be completely contrary to my goals—but I wanted to bring about emotion by a synthesis of authenticity in the décor, in the actual setting, in the things that real people said, in the way real people looked, where they lived, in a juxtaposition of all that, a development of the old idea of ‘montage of attractions,’ along a certain theme.” On October 11, 2014, Olive Trees was screened at the Hollywood Theatre in Portland Oregon. It was part of the Mid Century Oregon Genius Screening Series put on by The Oregon Cartoon Institute. The series included a screening of Maurice (1987) by James Ivory, with Mr. Ivory in person. James Blue and James Ivory had met while attending the University of Oregon in the 1950s.

== The March ==
The March, a documentary film produced by the United States Information Agency. Martin Luther King Jr.'s speech has been redacted from this video because of the copyright held by King's estate.

The March is a 1964 documentary film about the 1963 civil rights March on Washington. A quarter of a million people took part in the March on Washington. A television audience of millions watched Martin Luther King Jr. deliver his “I Have a Dream” speech. James Blue captured it on film. The March was shot in 35mm black and white film by a crew of 14 sound and camera men in 7 pairs, most of them from Hearst News. Blue was brought onto the project after the camera crews were hired. George Stevens Jr, the head of USIA films, said "I asked Jim Blue to become involved. No one at Hearst could craft the kind of film we wanted." Over three days they shot 59,795 feet of film - more than 11 hours of material. It was edited by Blue down to 3,021 feet, for a running time of 33 minutes. The budget was $50,000. In addition to directing and editing, it was narrated by Blue, including released prints in Spanish and French. The March was made for the Motion Picture Service unit of the United States Information Agency, a government entity that made informational, some would say propaganda, films. At the time, by law, USIA films were only seen outside of the United States. In 1990 the law was changed to allow USIA films to be shown domestically 12 years after they had been made.

The March won first place in the short features section of the fifth (1965) International Film Festival For Youth at Cannes. The March was screened at Venice, Tours, Bilbao and Cannes film festivals. It won grand prizes at Bilbao and Cannes. At Bilbao it won first prize for “Contributing Most to Friendliness and Understanding Between Peoples.” The Cannes Jury credited the film for its “concentrated rhythm which permitted clear interpretation of the way a powerful peaceful force was used to uphold a general desire for universal justice.” It was added to the National Film Registry in 2008. After being added to the National Film Registry, The March was restored by the Motion Picture Preservation Lab, which is responsible for performing preservation work on motion pictures held by the National Archives. Audrey Amidon was leader on the preservation of the film. Restoration work was completed in 2013. On the fiftieth anniversary of the March on Washington 2013 BAMcinématek presented two weeks of films, August 13–28 under the title "Time for Burning: Cinema of the Civil Rights Movement." The series included A Raisin in the Sun, To Kill a Mockingbird, Nothing But a Man, and much more. It concluded with a screening of Blue's The March.

== United States Information Agency ==
George Stevens Jr. met Blue at Cannes in 1962 and hired him to make films for the United States Information Agency. Prior to making The March, he had made three short films for the USIA. They were A Letter from Colombia (1962), The School at Rincon Santo (1962) and Evil Wind Out (1962). Collectively they are called the “Colombian Trilogy” on the Alliance for Progress. In August, 1963, George Stevens Jr., having returned from the Moscow Film Festival, gave a lecture to the Washington Film Council at the State Department Building in Washington. As part of the presentation he showed USIA films, including School at Rincon Santo and Letter to Columbia. In October 1963 Bosley Crowther in The New York Times wrote an article arguing that the USIA films should be legally shown in the States. He claimed that "The content of so many of these films is informative and inspiring, too, that to keep them from American audiences is to miss a natural chance to extend their use." he had recently seen a private screening of the films put on by George Stevens Jr. He wrote "A lovely little item, "The School at Rincon Santo" shows how the people of a Columbian village high in the mountains got together and built their first schoolhouse. It is meant to illustrate the spirit of the Alliance of Progress - People helping themselves. Shot by the USIA unit, headed by James Blue, it has a nice touch of poetry, compounded with the literalness of documentary." He ended the piece with "Several exciting projects are now in the works. James Blue is putting together an extensive documentary account of the August Freedom March on Washington, shot by several freely roving cameramen." Blue had only recently finished the final edit. The release prints would be struck starting December 3. Blue's last film for the USIA was A Few Notes on our Food Problem (1968). It was Blue's first film in color. It focused on agricultural production on three continents. It was shot in Taiwan, India, Uganda, and Brazil. It was nominated for the Academy Award for Best Feature Documentary.

== Ford Foundation Grant ==
Blue was among the first filmmakers to receive a grant for film making. In 1964 the Ford Foundation awarded twelve American filmmakers grants of up to $10,000 for a one-year period. The recipients could use the money to either produce short films or for travel and study. The awards were described as a “pilot project” by the director of the foundation’s program in humanities and the arts, W. McNeil Lowry. The filmmakers included Kenneth Anger, Bruce Conner, Jordan Belson and Stan Vanderbeek. The Foundation said: "James Blue, Portland, Ore., will travel consult with other directors in the United States, Canada and abroad." Blue interviewed dozens of world filmmakers. The audiotapes and videotapes are now housed at the University of Oregon.

The audiotapes were of:

- Gregory Shuker (1974, US)
- Albert Maysles and David Maysles (1964, US)
- Frances Flaherty (1964, US)
- Wolf Koenig (1964, Canada)
- Tom C. Daly (1964, Canada)
- Don Owen (1964, Canada)
- Shirley Clarke (1964, US)
- Guy Cote (1964, Canada)
- Gilles Groulx and B. Ulrich (1964, Canada)
- Stan Jackson (1964, Canada)
- George C. Stoney (1964, 1973, US)
- Richard Leacock (1964, US)
- Stanton Kaye (1964, US)
- Claude Jutra (1964, Canada)
- Terence McCartney-Filgate (1965, 1968, Canada)
- Jean Renoir (1965, US)
- Carroll Baker (1964-1965, US)
- Warren Beatty (1964-1965, US)
- Robert Bresson (1965, France)
- Basil Wright (1965, UK)
- Paul Rotha (1965, UK)
- Thorold Dickinson (1965, UK)
- Philip Donnelan (1965, UK)
- Peter Watkins (interview conducted with Michael Gill) (1965, UK) Johan van der Keuken (1965, The Netherlands)
- Jean Rouch (1965, France)
- Edgar Morin (1965, France)
- Louis Marcorelles (1965, France)
- Jean Mitry (1965, France)
- Bartheiemy Amenguel (1965, Algeria)
- Jean-Luc Godard and Richard Grenier (1965, France)
- William Klein (1965, France)
- Jacques Rozier (1965, France)
- Macha Méril (1965, France)
- Johanne Harrelle (1965, France)
- Anne Wiazemsky (1965, France)
- Roger Fjierstrom (1965, France)
- Francois LaFarge (1965, France)
- Gianfranco DeBosio (1965, Italy)
- Ermanno Olmi (1965, Italy)
- Tullio Kezich (1965, Italy)
- Ugo Gregoretti (1965, Italy)
- Francesco Rosi (1965, Italy)
- Federico Fellini (1965, Italy)
- Pier Paolo Pasolini (1965, Italy)
- Cesare Zavattini (1965, Italy)
- Bernardo Bertolucci (1965, Italy)
- Vittorio De Seta (1965, Italy)
- Vittorio DeSica (1965, Italy)
- Renato Castellani (1965, Italy)
- Miloš Forman (1965, Italy)
- Ivan Passer with Miloš Forman (1969, US)
- Satyajit Ray (1967, India)
- Gerald Krell (1967, US)
- George Stevens Sr. (1969, US)
- Susumu Hani (1969, Japan)
- King Vidor (1969, US)
- Jan Němec (ca. 1969, US)
- Roberto Rossellini (1970, US)
- Barry Gerson (1973, US)

The filmed interviews (Partial Listing) were of:

- Roberto Rossellini (1970s, US)
- John Marshall (1973, US)
- Ralph Steiner (1973, US)
- George C. Stoney (1973, US)
- Willard Van Dyke (1973, US)
- Robert Gardner (1973, US)
- Leo Hurwitz (1973, US)
- David Hancock (1973, US)
- Frank Capra (1979, US)

== Educator ==
Blue first taught at UCLA in 1964 and in the first classes offered by the American Film Institute. Among his students were Francis Ford Coppola, George Lucas, Thom Andersen, and Jim Morrison. In August 1969 he took part in the Creative Arts Conference sponsored by United States International University, San Diego, California. The Conference was a twelve-day series of lectures by ten artists and writers including James Blue, Richard Brautigan, Don Carpenter, Stephen Schneck, Michael McClure, Robert Creeley, Ed Dorn, Mike Ahnemann, Denis Sanders, and Jim Morrison. Blue showed Olive Trees of Justice and Morrison showed his Feast of Friends. Blue began at Rice University in Houston in 1970. He was brought to Houston by Gerald O'Grady, who wrote "I invited James Blue to formulate the film curriculum at The Media Center in Houston, which later moved to Rice University where I had taught earlier." Blue continued at Rice as co-director with Gerald O'Grady of the Media Center. In a 1976 article Blue wrote “Instead of training people for a more than doubtful Hollywood career, we can channel them towards this awakening of a community conscience. There’s plenty of work for everyone.” Filmmakers were brought in to the Media Center to conduct meetings and workshops periodically in order to engage and introduce students, faculty and community to direct cinema film making. Among them were Colin Young, then Dean of Arts at UCLA, the film director Roberto Rossellini, and Frantisek Daniel, director of the Prague Film School. Blue encouraged all students to see themselves as filmmakers. The Media Center received federal grants to purchase 8mm film and editing equipment with the intent for it to be made available to use by the public. One of Blue's purposes was to create "citizen filmmakers." He also started, with Ed Hugetz, the Southwest Alternate Media Project, in 1977. In 1978 he took a teaching position in the Department of Media Study at SUNY, Buffalo, NY. The James Blue Project lists him as an associate professor for documentary film in the Department of Media Study at SUNY Buffalo from 1977 to 1980.In 1980 he was interviewed by Anthony Bannon of the George Eastman House in Rochester, New York. To a question about why he preferred documentary over fiction he replied "I had a feeling that there was something magical about film that was not being used. An element that had not been fully exploited was its capacity to make art and meaning out of images out of the real world. And I felt that there was an incredible poetry in that, let alone the significance of the document. It was always more extraordinary for me to find things poetically than to invent them."

== Kenya Boran ==
In 1974 Blue created, with David MacDougall, the film Kenya Boran. It had four parts: Boran Herdsmen, Boran Women, Harambee: Pull Together, Kenya Boran. It was commissioned by American Universities Field Staff, and was funded by the National Science Foundation. It was shot over two months in Kenya. Margaret Mead called Kenya Boran the best ethnographic film she had ever seen.

== The Invisible City: Houston's Housing Crisis ==
Invisible City: Houston's Housing Crisis consisted of six one-hour episodes of an interactive public television series. Blue called it a “complex documentary.” It was later issued in two parts as “Who Killed the Fourth Ward?”(1978) and “Invisible City” (1979). “Who Killed the Fourth Ward?” is a three-hour documentary. It was made by Blue, Brien Huberman, and Ed Hugetz. The Fourth Ward is one of the oldest black communities in Houston. It addresses the city's acquisition of an historic Afro-American church for commercial expansion of the business district. The film features elected city officials, businessmen, and people of the Fourth Ward. Brian Huberman wrote “James Blue’s journey into the Fourth Ward provides a series of experiences for the audience to access this strange world, It can be a scary journey when Blue is put on the spot by challenging questions about, poverty, failure and race." Blue made “Invisible City” with Adele Santos, an architect at Rice University, whose students had researched the film. It looked at the decay of Houston’s housing stock. The film includes realtors, builders, heads of city agencies, and renters of properties. According to Blue’s colleague Gerald O’Grady: “The complex documentary began with a concern for and a commitment to changing a particular situation in an urban culture in which Blue himself lived. It was not to take a side but to explore all the facts in their complexity, and to research the problem in books and interviews and consultations with as many citizens from every strata involved in the issue, either as manager or victim.” The documentary was shot on Super 8mm film that was transferred to video tape.

== National Endowment for the Arts media funding panel ==
Blue was one of nine on the 1970 NEA funding panel. The others were Roger Englander (Chairman), Arthur Mayer, Dean Myhr Donn Pennebaker, Sheldon Renan, David Stewart. George Stoney, Willard Van Dyke. Among the programs they were involved in was the Public Media Program. It was a pilot program that provided funding for support of arts programming on film, television and radio. It also provided funding for regional film centers. Both Blue and Sheldon Renan were from Portland, Oregon. One of the regional film centers they approved for funding was the NW Film Center in Portland. For the Fiscal Year 1972, grants of $1,979,877 were given for the Public Media Program.

== Early life and education ==
Blue, with his family, moved from Tulsa to Portland, Oregon in 1942. Blue attended Jefferson High School in Portland. He graduated from the University of Oregon with a BA in Speech and Theater in 1953. After a hitch in the army he returned to the U of O for a Masters in Theater Arts, then left after receiving a scholarship to complete his Masters at the Institut des hautes études cinématographiques (IDHEC) in Paris from 1956-58. At IDHEC Blue took classes from Jean Mitry and Georges Sadoul. Fellow students were Costa-Gavras, Johan van der Keuken, and James Dormeyer. At the IDHEC he made the film, with Johan van der Keuken, Paris a l'aube (1957).

== The James Blue Alliance ==
In 2014, Richard Blue, James Blue's brother, created the James Blue Alliance to preserve and share James Blue's legacy of pioneering participatory investigative media. Richard Blue and the Alliance have been raising funds for the restoration of Olive Trees of Justice to be re-released by Milestone Films. In 2015 Richard Blue was given the first Elmer Buehler Award for his work in restoring Olive Trees. The Alliance chose the University of Oregon to house the James Blue's films, papers and ephemera, as a resource for students, historians, film-makers, and others. On October 19, 2017, the James Blue Alliance, in partnership with the NW Film Center, presented the premiere of the documentary film Citizen Blue: The Life and Art of Cinema Master James Blue at the Whitsell Auditorium in Portland, Oregon. The Alliance funded the James Blue Award to be given out at the Ashland (Oregon) Independent Film Festival to "a filmmaker whose first or second documentary or narrative feature exemplifies the values of Oregonian director James Blue (1930-80), whose work addressed complex issues of social justice and social/political change." The James Blue Award was given at the 2019 Ashland Independent Film Festival to Alyssa Fedele and Zachary Fink of The Rescue List.
