= The March (1964 film) =

- Martin Luther King Jr.'s speech has been redacted from this video because of the copyright held by King's estate.
- Directed by: James Blue
- Distributed by: U.S. Information Agency
- Release dates: 1964 (non-U.S.); 1990 (U.S.)
- Running time: 33 minutes
- Country: United States
- Language: English

External audio
- I Have a Dream, 28 August 1963, Educational Radio Network

The March, also known as The March to Washington, is a 1964 documentary film by James Blue about the 1963 civil rights March on Washington. It was made for the Motion Picture Service unit of the United States Information Agency for use outside the United States – the 1948 Smith-Mundt Act prevented USIA films from being shown domestically without a special act of Congress. In 1990 Congress authorized these films to be shown in the U.S. twelve years after their initial release.

In 2008, the film was selected for preservation in the United States National Film Registry by the Library of Congress as being "culturally, historically, or aesthetically significant".

== See also ==
- Civil rights movement in popular culture
- List of American films of 1964
