= Shane Bemis =

American politician

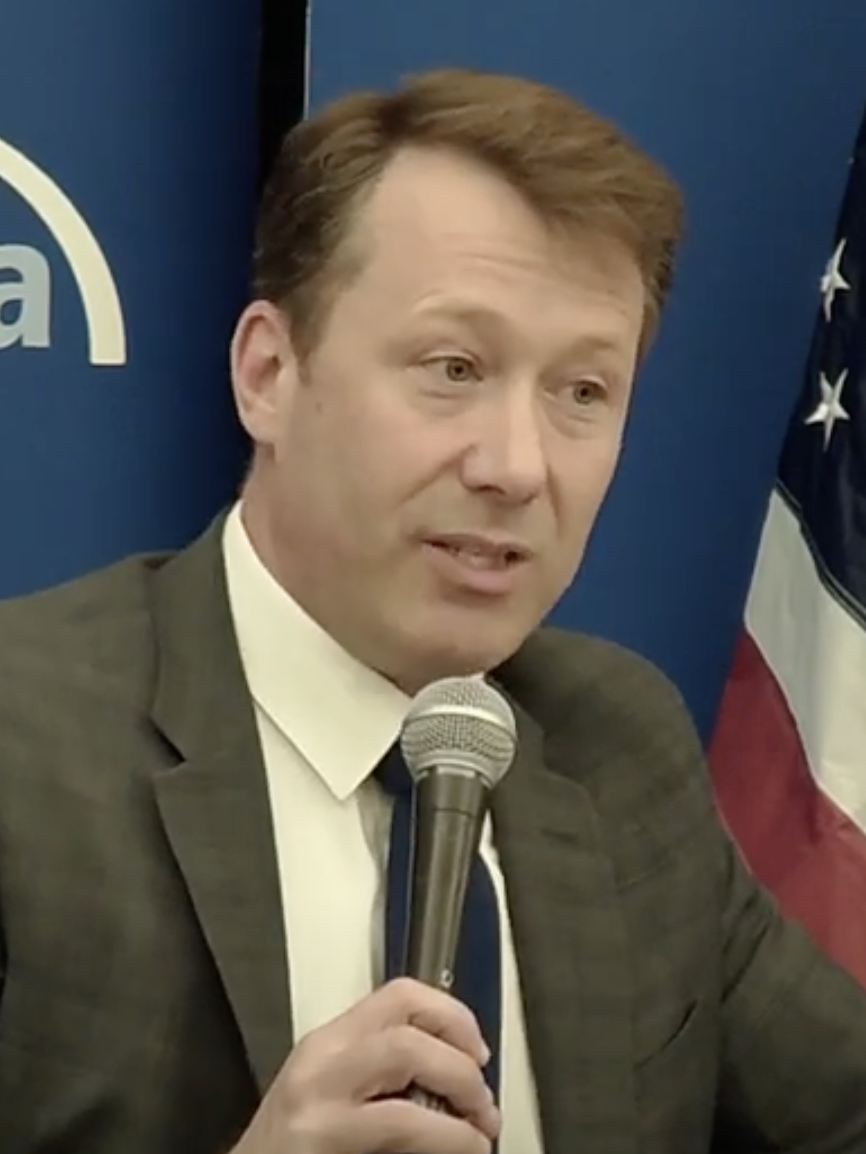

Mayor of Gresham, Oregon
- In office January 2007 – June 2020
- Preceded by: Charles Becker
- Succeeded by: Karylinn Echols

Personal details
- Born: 1972 (age 53–54) Billings, Montana
- Party: Un Affiliated
- Spouse: Alix Bemis
- Children: Three Sons
- Education: Marylhurst University
- Profession: Restaurateur, politician

Shane Bemis (born c. 1972) is an American politician who is the former mayor of Gresham, Oregon, Oregon's fourth-largest city. He was elected mayor in 2006, at the age of 34, becoming the youngest mayor in Gresham's history. Prior to serving as mayor, Bemis served as a city councilor for Gresham for one term between 2003 and 2007.

== Early life ==
Shane Bemis was born in Billings, Montana, into a politically active family and ultimately chose to become politically. Raised in Billings, he moved to Gresham when he was fifteen years old. After graduating high school, he attended Marylhurst University, where he earned a bachelor's degree in communications.

In his twenties, Bemis opened a Bellagio's Pizzeria franchise in Gresham. He credits his business pursuits with his belief in bringing a "business-oriented" approach to local governance in Gresham.

== Political career ==
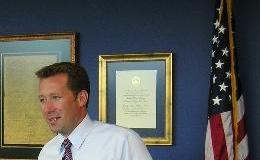
Bemis in 2009

In 2002, Bemis ran for councilor in position #6 against John W. Dillow and won the election by a nearly two-to-one margin. After serving one term, Bemis ran for mayor in 2006 and was elected mayor over incumbent Charles Becker, by a margin of 7,417 votes to 5,208.

In 2007, Mayor Bemis pushed TriMet, the local transit agency, to tackle crime along the MAX light-rail line. This effort resulted in the creation of a transit-police precinct in Gresham.

Bemis was named by the Portland Business Journal as one of the region's "Forty Under 40 Award" recipients in 2007. The award honors 40 people in the region under the age of 40 who have shown great accomplishments in their professional lives and made outstanding contributions to their communities. Bemis is a prominent local business person in Gresham, where he is a restaurateur.

Bemis was mentioned as a potential Republican candidate for the 2016 Oregon special gubernatorial election, but ultimately declined to run.

Bemis announced his retirement on June 16, 2020, citing the need to spend time with his family and keep his restaurant business viable during the COVID-19 pandemic.
