= Mary F. Sammons =

American businesswoman (born 1946)

- Born: October 12, 1946 (age 79); Portland, Oregon, U.S.
- Education: Marylhurst College (BA)
- Occupation: Businesswoman
- Spouse: Nickolas F. Sammons (m. 1967)
- Children: 1
- Parent(s): Lee W. Jackson; Ann Cherry

Mary F. Sammons (born October 12, 1946) is an American businesswoman who was the chairperson and CEO of Rite Aid. She was formerly the president and CEO of Fred Meyer.

== Biography ==
Mary F. Sammons was born in 1946 and hails from Portland, Oregon. She graduated from Marylhurst University (at the time Marylhurst College) and St. Mary's Academy.

Sammons worked at Fred Meyer Stores for 26 years and held the position of President and CEO until 1999.

In 1999, Sammons became President/COO of Rite Aid. In 2003, Sammons became the CEO of Rite Aid. In 2010, she stepped down from her position as CEO and remained Chairman until 2012.

In 2009, Forbes named her the 21st most powerful woman in the world.
