= Marylhurst University =

Private university in Oregon (1893–2018)

- Former names: St. Mary's Academy and College; Marylhurst College
- Motto: Cor Sapientis Quaerit Doctrinam (Latin); The heart of the wise seeks knowledge
- Type: Private
- Active: 1893–2018
- Affiliations: Roman Catholic (Sisters of the Holy Names of Jesus and Mary)
- President: Melody Rose
- Location: Marylhurst, Oregon, United States; 45°23′54″N 122°38′46″W
- Campus: Suburban 63 acres (250,000 m^{2})
- Colors: Gold and royal blue
- Website: marylhurst.edu

Marylhurst University was a private applied liberal arts and business university in Marylhurst, Oregon. Marylhurst was founded as St. Mary's College in 1893 and run for many years by the Sisters of the Holy Names of Jesus and Mary. The former campus is located about nine miles south of Portland, Oregon on the Willamette River. Although Marylhurst University was a Catholic school, it served students of all faiths and backgrounds.

The university offered bachelor's degree completion programs in diverse liberal arts and business fields, and graduate degrees in such fields as business and nonprofit administration, food systems and society, teaching, art therapy counseling, divinity and applied theology, and interdisciplinary studies. After its establishment in 1893, Marylhurst became the first women's liberal arts college in the Pacific Northwest. In 1974, Marylhurst College became a co-educational institution, and in 1998 it was reorganized as Marylhurst University through the addition of new academic programs.

The university's student population peaked around 2,000 during the Great Recession of 2007–2009, and declined from 1,409 to 743 in just four years, from fall 2013 to fall 2017.

The university closed at the end of the summer of 2018, and this declining enrollment was given as the main reason. Prior to the closure, however, Marylhurst's faculty challenged the narrative of closure as essential.

== History ==
The Sisters of the Holy Names of Jesus and Mary, a Catholic religious teaching congregation, arrived in Oregon in 1859. The Sisters came to Oregon from Montreal at the request of the people and clergy of the state to serve their educational needs, and established St. Mary's Academy in Portland that year.

=== St. Mary's College ===
In 1893, the group started St. Mary's Academy and College as the first liberal arts college to serve the educational needs of Pacific Northwest women. The school began in downtown Portland, where St. Mary's Academy is still located. The Sisters purchased 63 acres (250,000 m^{2}) between Lake Oswego and West Linn in 1908. The Sisters named the pastoral land Marylhurst, which means "Mary's Woods". In 1929 it became the only accredited standard four year college for women in the Pacific Northwest. The college was moved to the new property in 1930, and St. Mary's was renamed Marylhurst College. Starting in 1977 the school was accredited by the Northwest Association of Secondary and Higher Schools.

=== Marylhurst College ===
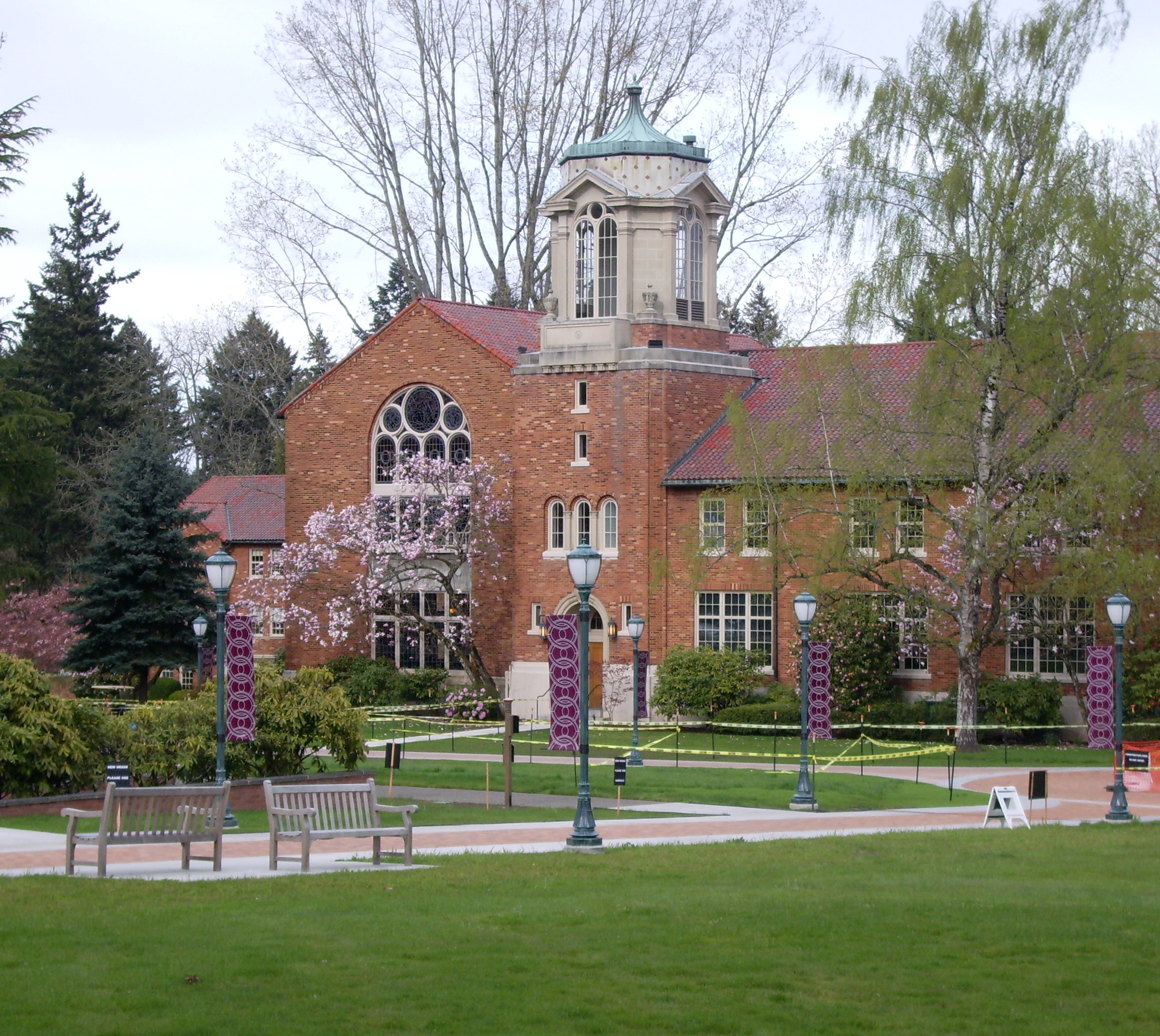
The B.P. John Administrative Building at the effective center of campus

In 1959, Marylhurst College became an independent institution and formed a Board of Trustees, separate from the Sisters of the Holy Names of Jesus and Mary.

In 1974, the college transitioned to a co-educational institution and it became the first liberal arts college in the United States to be designated as a college for lifelong learning.

The American Art Therapy Association reviewed the program positively numerous times including 1991, 1996 and 2002.

Beginning in 1996, U.S. News & World Report's Guide to America's Best Colleges recognized Marylhurst. The university remained as "unranked" for the Western Region in the U.S. News & World Report college rankings since the mid-1990s.

=== Marylhurst University ===
In 1998, Marylhurst College became Marylhurst University, Clackamas County's first university. Several new academic programs were added including a Master of Arts in Applied Theology program, a Bachelor of Music Therapy program, and a cooperative Doctor of Ministry degree program with San Francisco Theological Seminary. Judith Johansen was named president of the university in 2008 and left in 2013. Melody Rose served as president from August 2014 until late 2018.

In May 2018, the university announced that it would be closing. The university's enrollment had declined significantly in just a few years, from over 1,400 students in 2013 to about half that many students in 2018. The university turned the campus over to the Sisters of the Holy Names of Jesus and Mary, the religious order with which it is affiliated.

Saint Martin's University was selected to serve as the custodial institution for Marylhurst University. As of Dec. 3, 2018, Marylhurst alumni can access their records and transcripts through Saint Martin's University.

== Academics ==
Marylhurst University offered nearly 50 undergraduate and graduate degree programs. Marylhurst began the Master of Art Therapy program in 1986, the only accredited art therapy program in the Pacific Northwest. In 1990, Marylhurst inaugurated its Master of Business Administration program and a concentration in interior design was added to the art program. In 2002, the University began to offer a BFA in interior design.

Four online MBA programs were offered by Marylhurst: an MBA, an MBA in Healthcare Management, an MBA in Sustainability, and an MBA in Real Estate.

The school also offered 12 shorter undergraduate, graduate, post-graduate, teacher endorsement certificate programs.

Marylhurst had dual-enrollment agreements with Portland State University, Portland Community College and Clackamas Community College.

== The Art Gym ==
The Art Gym was a contemporary arts exhibition space located on campus. It was the brainchild of Kay Slusarenko, who was the art department chair for 20 years, from 1978 to 1998. With contemporaries Terri Hopkins and Paul Sutinen, she rallied the student body and community support to turn the unused gym into the cultural center that it is now. Each spring the gym displays the year's thesis projects. Since 1980, over 300 artists have shown their work at the gym. Marylhurst University announced it would cease operations in 2018, prompting concern about the Art Gym's future. In July 2018, the Art Gym announced that it would be moving to the Oregon College of Art and Craft effective August 1, 2018.

== Oregon Sesquicentennial Film Festival ==
The Oregon Sesquicentennial Film Festival was held at Marylhurst University May 1–10, 2009. The festival was a celebration of the history of Oregon film making. For the festival a 35mm projection booth was constructed on campus in the Villa Maria building. The opening night of the festival was at the Mission Theater with an on stage conversation between James Ivory and Gus Van Sant.

The films shown at Marylhurst included Smoke Signals with director Chris Eyre in person; Marked Woman featuring Mayo Methot; Talk Radio with writer Tad Savinar in person; The Lusty Men (set in and partially shot at the Pendleton Round-up); City Girl by F.W. Murnau, shot on location in Athena, Oregon (with a score composed by John Paul and performed by a string quartet; A Soldier's Tale by Penny Allen, and James Ivory's first international hit film Shakespeare Wallah, with James Ivory attending. The special Oregon Cartoon Institute Day at the festival featured Bill Plympton.

== Notable alumni ==
- Shane Bemis, mayor of Gresham, Oregon
- Madeline DeFrees, poet and author
- Elizabeth Engstrom, author
- Norma Heyser, Oregon modernist artist
- Barbara Roberts, governor of Oregon
- Mary F. Sammons, president and chief executive officer of Rite Aid
