= Jack Brownlow =

American jazz musician (1923–2007)

Jack Brownlow (March 3, 1923 - October 27, 2007) was an American jazz piano player.

== Life ==
Brownlow was born in Spokane, Washington, and after serving in the Navy in World War II he lived in Los Angeles from 1945–46, playing with Lester Young, Boyd Raeburn and others. He returned to Wenatchee after that to work in the family printing business. In the mid-1960s he returned to playing music full-time. Jack Brownlow was the most respected jazz pianist working in Seattle from the late 1960s until his death. JazzTimes noted of him that per their contributing writer Doug Ramsey's liner notes, "Brownlow is a legend in the Pacific Northwest." At a party at Ramsey's house in 1971, saxophone player Paul Desmond heard Jack play and reportedly said "If I played piano, that's how I'd want to play it."

"Ray Blagoff, later a lead trumpeter in name bands and the Hollywood studios, was with Jack at the Farragut Naval Base in Idaho. “We were all in awe of his ear,” Blagoff says. “He could play anything in any key."

Scott Faulkner, who played bass with Brownlow, wrote "When Bruno and I played at the Canlis piano bar, he hated when people sang along. When Bruno wanted to ditch a singer, it wasn’t a fair fight…nobody ever even made it to the bridge. I wouldn’t have thought that a pianist could go through four completely unrelated keys within 16 bars and still make a song sound good. It was great ear training for me, although I must say I, too, ended up on the short end sometimes. I have known very few people who have mastered music completely. Jack Brownlow is one of them."

Brownlow died on 27 October 2007 of kidney failure. He was 84 when he died.

== Can't We Be Friends ==
In 1993 Brownlow volunteered to play piano for the Seattle Cabaret production "Can't We Be Friends." His talent, generosity, and knowledge made the show possible. It opened on May 20 at the Pike St. Cabaret, playing Thursday - Sunday, and was extended for every Tuesday into September. The show was a musical exploration of women who wrote pop tunes in the first half of the Twentieth Century for Tin Pan Alley and Broadway. Brownlow played piano with Scott Faulkner on bass and John Draper on tenor sax. Nora Michaels was the singer and star of the show. It was a multi media show that also included 35mm slides, 16mm films, a recording of a piano roll and the voice of Jelly Roll Morton.

Three years later Nora Michaels was singing songs by women songwriters in New York when she was heard by a producer for Public Broadcasting. That led to the American Masters "Yours for a Song: The Women of Tin Pan Alley, that aired nationally on PBS in 1999. Nora Michaels sings in the production. It was directed by Terry Benes. The show shed more light to a much larger audience on forgotten women who had created great songs. None of this would have happened if Brownlow had not stepped up in 1993 in Seattle to share his gifts and knowledge.

== Recordings ==
Dark Dance Audio CD 1996 Featuring Clipper Anderson (bass), Mark Ivestor (drums), Andy Zadronzny (bass), Marty Tuttle (drums)

- Dark Dance (Brownlow) based on Dancing in the Dark (Dietz and Schwartz)
- For Evans' Sake (Brownlow)
- I Didn't Know What Time it Was (Rodgers and Hart)
- Seascape (Johnny Mandel)
- All of You (Cole Porter)
- Jim-nopodie (Brownlow)
- Nobody Else But Me (Kern and Hammerstein)
- On A Trumpet Cloud (Duke Ellington and Lawrence Brown)
- I Wish I Knew (Warren and Gordon)
- Summer Night (Warren and Dubin)
- I Hear a Rhapsody (Fragos, Baker, and Gaspare)
- Goodbye (Gordon Jenkins)

Suddenly It's Bruno Audio CD 1999 Jack Brownlow Trio featuring Dean Hodges and Jason Vontver (drums), Jeff Johnson (bass)

- Suddenly It's Spring (Burke and Van Heusen)
- The Thrill is Gone (Lew Brown and Ray Henderson)
- Lament (J.J. Johnson)
- Moonlight (John Williams and Marilyn Bergman)
- When You Wish Upon a Star ( Ned Washington, Leigh Harline)
- Orbits - Unless It's You (Bill Evans)
- I Do It for your Love (Paul Simon)
- Gone with the Breeze (Brownlow)
- The Leaves (Brownlow)
- I Fall in love Too Easily (Sammy Cahn and Jule Styne)
- As Long as there's Music (Sammy Cahn and Jule Styne)
- If I Should Lose You (Leo Robin and Ralph Rainger)
- Detour Ahead (Herb Ellis, Lou Carter and John Frigo)
