= Kurt Heyser =

- Born: 27 August 1894
- Died: 20 April 1974 (aged 79)
- Military career
- Allegiance: German Empire (to 1918); Weimar Republic (to 1919); Nazi Germany
- Branch: Army (Wehrmacht)
- Service years: 1913–1919; 1935–1945
- Rank: Generalmajor
- Conflicts: World War II
- Awards: Knight's Cross of the Iron Cross

Kurt Heyser (27 August 1894 – 20 April 1974) was a general in the Wehrmacht of Nazi Germany during World War II. He was a recipient of the Knight's Cross of the Iron Cross.

== Awards and decorations ==
- Knight's Cross of the Iron Cross on 26 May 1940 as Oberst and commander of Infanterie-Regiment 47

== Notes ==
Military offices
Preceded by Generalmajor Otto Roettig	Commander of Infanterie-Regiment 47; 1 November 1939 – 15 July 1941	Succeeded by Oberstleutnant Albert Latz
