= Norma Heyser =

American artist (born 1933)

- Born: Norma Edythe Heyser; 1933 (age 92–93); Portland, Oregon
- Education: University of Oregon; Museum Art School; Marylhurst University
- Known for: Modernist paintings, collage
- Notable work: "Centennial Painting 1959"

Norma Heyser (born 1933) is an American contemporary artist from Portland, Oregon, who worked in mixed media and new art forms, influenced by Cubism and Abstract expressionism.

== Early life and education ==
Norma Edythe Heyser, born in Portland in 1933, is the daughter of Norman Lewis Heyser and Agnes Grace Peters. She studied at the University of Oregon with Andrew Vincent and David McCosh from 1951 to 1953, and at the Museum Art School with William Givler from 1953 to 1956, earning a BA in art from Marylhurst University in 1980. She married Ronald Orrin Peterson in 1956 and they reared two sons.

She and her husband worked at the Museum of Modern Art in New York City during 1957–1958. They returned to Portland in 1958 to open the New Gallery of Contemporary Ar, which closed in 1962.

In 1963, she co-taught a course at Mt. Angel College along with Ron Peterson, Joyce Britton, and Lee Kelly, entitled, "Explorations in Art," which consisted of "lectures, demonstrations and practice in sculpting, drawing and painting".

== Critical reception ==
Heyser's earliest work was influenced by cubism. In the 1950s, she became an abstract expressionist artist, while in the 1960s she self-identified as an Oregon modernist and created "installation and conceptual art and began to experiment with mixed media and other new art forms". Since 1982, Heyser has worked in mixed media and collage, as well as ink drawings.

Reviewing a 1961 exhibit, The Capital Journal wrote,

The paintings of Norma Heyser are predominately large in scale, bold in their powerful images and simple in choice of color. One can sense a vast kinetic energy in the movement of color and form, a fact borne out by the Artist's own statement that she feels the relation of her painting in this idiom to dance and music.

In 1968, The Capital Journal wrote of Heyser, "The young Portland artist is described as one of the most innovative proponents of the 'new art' which goes beyond two-dimensional wall painting and pedestal sculptures for total viewer involvement."

Heyser has been quoted saying she "stopped making [art] work for ecology reasons", and that for her "art and social action are inseparable".

== Selected exhibitions ==
- Blue-yellow, Mt. Angel College, 1960
- An Exhibition of Portland Painting and Sculpture, Bush House, with Lee Kelly and Joyce Britton, 1961
- Norma Heyser, A journey from 1962
- "Centennial Painting 1959" 1959, oil on canvas, Mark Ross Gearhart Collection, Hallie Ford Museum of Art.

== Publications ==
- Little Body Book: Every Human Body is a Work of Art

== Awards and honors ==
- Oregon Centennial Exposition and Trade Fair of 1959, award for painting
- 2013 — Honored at Hallie Ford Museum "for her life's contributions to the art world"
