= Rose Bond =

Canadian-American animator

- Education: Portland State University, School of the Art Institute of Chicago
- Known for: Animation artist and Installation artist
- Website: http://rosebond.com/

Rose Bond is a Canadian-born media artist, animator and professor who currently lives and works in Portland, Oregon. She has been considered a scholar on the subject of animation and an experienced animator herself. Bond's animations and short films have been shown at film festivals including the Sundance Film Festival. Bond is also known for her architectural animation installations. She shown work at Exeter Castle in 2010 and created a prototype animation for the Smithsonian. Bond's hand-painted films are held in the film collection at the Museum of Modern Art.

== Biography ==
Bond was born in Canada and raised in Oregon. She reports that she had been drawing and recognized for her art since she was in kindergarten. Bond graduated from Portland State University (PSU) with a bachelor's degree in 1971 and later with a master's degree in education in 1976. Bond struggled with making her creative visions a reality while she was in college, and believed that teaching art was the only way she could make a living. Later, she received a masters of fine arts from the School of the Art Institute of Chicago where she studied experimental film-making.

On September 18, 2001, Bond created and registered a business for her animations in Oregon under the name Rose Bond Moving Pictures.

Currently, Bond teaches at the Pacific Northwest College of Art (PNCA) in Portland, Oregon, where she is an associate professor and a lead faculty in Animated Arts.

== Work ==
Bond started out using traditional methods of creating animation with flipbooks and inking by hand. Later she began to experiment with using computers. She uses digital tablets, like those made by Wacom, to teach her students at PNCA. Her current work is mainly public art featuring site-specific animations which use a combination of hand-drawn and digital art.

Bond's earlier films deal with feminist issues, questioning whether one gender should rule over another through the medium of animated Irish legends. In these stories (Deirdre's Choice, Macha's Curse and Cerridwen's Gift), based on figures from Irish legends, Bond painted directly onto clear 35 mm film to create the effect of animation. Her hand-drawn and hand-painted images for these films were considered dramatic by reviewer, Wendy Jackson, who also felt that Bond's choice of heroines showed a "feminist sensibility."

Bond's first animation installation was staged in 2002 in Portland, using the historic Seamen's Bethel Building. Her installation work "challenges people to think about how they perceive time, space, and memory." When beginning a new animation projection, Bond researches the history of the building and incorporates it into the projection. She visits each spot where she will be creating an installation, exploring the buildings and gleaning interesting historical facts to use in her animations. In Broadsided!, her animation commissioned by the Exeter Arts Council for Exeter Castle, Bond discovered the story of a man who was hung for stealing sheep which she uses in her animated story.

One of her most shown installations, Intra Muros (2007), was shown at the first Platform Animation Festival in Portland and consists of projected animations in the windows that loop every eight minutes. Intra Muros invites viewers to wonder what is going on in the spaces they cannot see. Bond's installation, Gates of Light, reached audiences that were not familiar with experimental film. Bond's projected animations also have the unique capacity to turn the mundane building people see everyday into something special and to challenge with her work, a viewer's "sense of familiarity." Bond is excited about the potential for animation to change the "cultural landscape."

Rose Bond is featured as one of six interviewees in Martin Cooper's feature documentary History, Mystery & Odyssey: The Lives and Work of Six Portland Animators (2023). The other interviewees are Joan C. Gratz, Joanna Priestley, Chel White, Jim Blashfield and Zak Margolis. The film premiered at the 2023 Ottawa International Animation Festival.

=== Films ===
- Electroflux (2008)
- Ward of Court: Country of Origin (2007)
- Memoria Mortalis (2000)
- Rain Tiles (1997)
- Deirdre's Choice (1995)
- Remote Control (1992)
- Mallacht Macha / Macha's Curse (1990)
- Cerridwen's Gift (1987)
- Nexus (1984)
- Gaia's Dream (1982)

=== Installations ===
- Intra Muros (Zagreb) (2013)
- Intra Muros (Toronto) (2011)
- Broadsided! (2010)
- Mu-ta-tion (Electrogals) (2010)
- Intra Muros (Utrecht) (2008)
- Intra Muros (Portland) (2007)
- Gates of Light (New York) (2007)
- Illumination #1 (Portland) (2002)

=== Awards ===
- Caldera-Ford Family Residency Stipend (2012).
- Princess Grace Special Project Award (2011).
- Princess Grace Foundation Statue Award (2008).
- Sara Roby Award for Outstanding Achievement in Furthering Higher Education (2008).
- Princess Grace Special Project Award (2006).
- Princess Grace Special Project Award (2004).
- National Endowment for the Arts Grant (1999).
- Chicago Children's Film Festival, First Place, Macha's Curse (1991).
- Graduate Film Scholarship from the Princess Grace Foundation (1989).
- Chicago Children's Film Festival, Certificate of Merit, Cerridwen's Gift (1987).

== Bibliography/discography ==
- Bond, Rose (May 2015). "Arresting Power: Resisting Police Violence in Portland, Oregon". Afterimage. 42 (6): 34. doi:10.1525/aft.2015.42.6.34. ISSN 0300-7472.
- ElectroFlux (eVideo). National Film Board of Canada. 2008. OCLC 889557000.
- A Celtic Trilogy (DVD video). Rose Bond Moving Pictures. 1997. OCLC 840841405. "Three award-winning animated stories including Deirdre's Choice, Macha's Curse and Cerridwen's Gift. Includes a mini-documentary."
