= Jim Blashfield =

American filmmaker and media artist

Jim Blashfield (born September 4, 1944, in Seattle, Washington) is an American filmmaker and media artist, best known for his short films such as Suspicious Circumstances and The Mid-Torso of Inez, and his music videos for musicians Talking Heads, Joni Mitchell, Nu Shooz, Paul Simon, Peter Gabriel, Michael Jackson, Tears for Fears, Marc Cohn, and "Weird Al" Yankovic. He has collaborated with Bill Frisell and the Oregon Symphony.

Blashfield is the recipient of a Cannes Golden Lion, a Grammy Award, and 17 MTV Video Music Award nominations, including 3 Awards.

Other films include Bunnyheads, SuctionMaster, Vanity, and The Tasseled Loafers, an irreverent interpretation of Hector Berlioz' Dream of a Witch's Sabbath with music by the Czech Philharmonic, and the recent film Basement Suite.

Recent multi-image installations include the 11-screen welded aluminum sculpture "Mechanism", Tilicum Crossing's "Flooded Data Machine", the 7-screen "Circulator" and the 5-screen "Conveyor".

Jim Blashfield is featured as one of six interviewees in Martin Cooper's feature documentary History, Mystery & Odyssey: The Lives and Work of Six Portland Animators (2023). The other interviewees are Joan C. Gratz, Joanna Priestley, Chel White, Rose Bond and Zak Margolis. The film premiered at the 2023 Ottawa International Animation Festival.

== Filmography ==
=== Selected short films ===
- The Mid-Torso of Inez, (1978) Produced in collaboration with Vern Luce
- Suspicious Circumstances, (1985) Music by Steve Koski, Ken Butler and Stan Wood
- My Dinner with the Devil Snake (1990)
- The Tasseled Loafers, (2001) Music by Hector Berlioz and the Czech Philharmonic
- St. Helens Road, (2002) Music by the Land Camera Micro Orchestra (2002)
- The Lone Ranger, (2002) Music by Bill Frisell
- Bunnyheads, (2007) Based on the sculpture of Christine Bourdette, co-produced with Lourri Hammack
- SuctionMaster: Triumph of Science (2008)
- Vanity (2010)

=== Moving Image Installations ===
- Evolution of a City, (1997) Produced in collaboration with Carol Sherman
- Running Dog w/ Cactus, (2002)
- The Resurrectory, (2004) In collaboration with the Liminal Performance Group
- Conveyor, (2010)
- Circulator, (2011)
- Flooded Data Machine, (2015)
- Mechanism (2017)

=== Theater / Performance ===
- Bird of Paradise, (1989) Written and directed in collaboration with Victoria Parker

=== Music videos ===
- "And She Was", Talking Heads (1985) / MTV Nominations (1986): Best Group Video, Best Concept Video
- "Good Friends", Joni Mitchell (1985)
- "I Can't Wait", Nu Shooz (1985)
- "The Boy in the Bubble", Paul Simon (1986) / MTV Nominations (1987): Best Video, Best Special Effects, Best Art Direction, Most Experimental, Viewers' Choice
- "Don't Give Up" (version 2), Peter Gabriel & Kate Bush (1986)
- "Leave Me Alone", Michael Jackson (1989) / Grammy Award (1990): Best Short Form Music Video / Cannes Golden Lion Award (1989): Best Special Effects / MTV Award (1989): Best Special Effects / MTV Nominations (1989): Best Video, Breakthrough Video, Best Art Direction, Best Editing, Viewers' Choice
- "Sowing the Seeds of Love", Tears for Fears (1989) / MTV Awards (1990): Breakthrough Video, Best Special Effects / MTV Nominations (1990): Best Group Video, Best Post-Modern Video
- "Walk Through the World", Marc Cohn (1993)
- "Pancreas", "Weird Al" Yankovic (2006)

=== Sesame Street ===
Blashfield Studio produced several segments directed by others for Sesame Street during the 1980s and the 1990s.

- The Word is No
- Monster in the Mirror
- Exploring in Your Closet
- Forty Blocks from My Home
- Isadora's Sneakers - a short about the seasons
- I Like to Pretend - I Can Fly / I'm an Astronaut
