= 1982 animators' strike =

1982 labor strike in the Greater Los Angeles area

- Date: August 5 – October 16, 1982 (2 months, 1 week and 4 days)
- Location: Greater Los Angeles, California, United States
- Caused by: Runaway productions
- Goals: Protections against runaway productions
- Methods: Picketing; Strike action; Walkout
- Result: Strike fails, union agrees to new contracts favorable to the studios

Parties
Motion Picture Screen Cartoonists Local 839	Multiple animation studios in the United States

The 1982 animators' strike was a labor strike conducted by American animators in the Greater Los Angeles area. The strike, organized by the Motion Picture Screen Cartoonists Local 839, was caused by disagreements between the labor union and studios over runaway productions, a term referring to outsourcing production work to outside of the metropolitan area. The strike ran from August to October and ended in failure for the union, who failed to win concessions from the studios.

== Background ==
=== Labor organization in the American animation industry ===
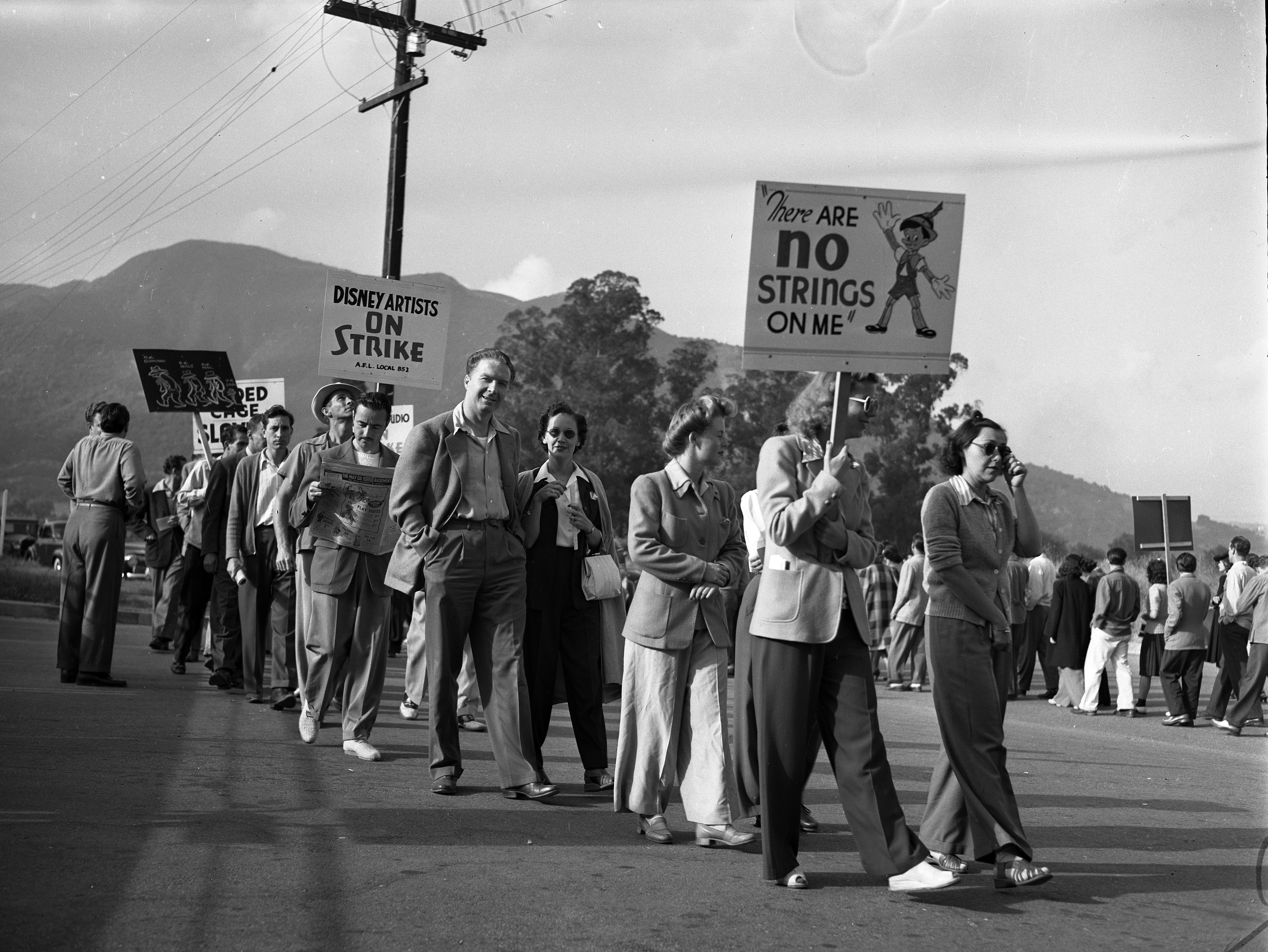
Multiple labor strikes occurred in the American animation industry during the 1930s and 1940s, such as the Disney animators' strike in 1941.

Unionization in the American animation industry began in the 1930s. At the time, workers in the industry saw unionizing as a way to combat poor working conditions, which included workweeks of over 40 hours without overtime pay, high production quotas, and a lack of credit for their work. Through the 1930s and 1940s, labor unions attempted to organize workers at many different animation studios, resulting in numerous labor disputes. The industry's first major labor strike occurred in 1937 when workers at Fleischer Studios in New York City went on strike. Other notable strikes during this time include the 1941 Disney animators' strike at Walt Disney Productions and a 1947 strike at Terrytoons that was the longest in the industry's history, lasting 28 weeks. By January 1942, this strong push amongst labor organizers had resulted in 90 percent of animators in the United States belonging to a union. While much of this push had come from the Screen Cartoonist's Guild, a union that was founded in 1938, by the 1950s, the Guild was gradually replaced in popularity by another union, the Motion Picture Screen Cartoonists (MPSC) Local 839, and by 1970, the Guild had ceased to exist.

=== Runaway productions ===
The Supreme Court's ruling in the 1948 case United States v. Paramount Pictures, Inc. severely hurt the animation industry, especially regarding the creation of animated short films, and in the decade that followed, animation studios began to explore new options to reduce costs. This included outsourcing animation work from countries other than the United States, a process known in the industry as a runaway production. The first major animation project to be created as a runaway production was the 1950s series The Adventures of Rocky and Bullwinkle and Friends. According to the show's creator, work they considered "above the line" (more creative processes such as directing, storyboarding, and animating) were done in the United States, while work considered "below the line" (more labor-intensive tasks such as inking and painting) were done at an animation studio in Mexico City. However, for much of the decade, the prohibitive costs associated with shipping, logistics, and customs offset the potential savings that animation studios stood to gain by outsourcing. Additionally, animators and producers in the United States viewed animation produced in other countries as often being of lesser quality, with the creators of Rocky and Bullwinkle eventually deciding against future runaway productions due in part to the quality of the animation they had received from the Mexican studio. However, starting in the 1960s, it became much more common for studios to outsource parts of the animation process to other countries, primarily in Asia and Europe. One reason for this trend was the growth in popularity of animated series made for television. Hanna-Barbera, an American animation studio that produced many projects for television, had seen a rapid growth during this time and by the 1960s, the studio announced plans to outsource. Beginning in the early 1970s, the company began to outsource more and more of its projects to countries such as South Korea and Taiwan. Many of the countries where outsourcing occurred had much weaker labor laws and union presence was either not as strong as it was in the United States or was nonexistent, leading to significantly lower wages for the animation workers in these countries compared to the United States. By 1978, three-quarters of the production work carried out by Hanna-Barbera was occurring outside of their own studio.

=== Tensions between the union and studios ===
The American animation industry, centered around Los Angeles, had been organized in the 1940s, and by the 1970s, the Motion Picture Screen Cartoonists (MPSC) Local 839 was the main union representing the workers and negotiating contracts between the major animation studios. By the 1970s, the main issue of contention between the union and companies concerned outsourcing, with studios such as Hanna-Barbera and Walt Disney Productions subcontracting non-unionized animators from outside of the United States to perform production work on their projects. By 1978, 75 percent of the production work on Hanna-Barbera animation was occurring outside of their studios.

As runaway productions became more common, more American animators became concerned with limiting the amount of work that studios were outsourcing. During contract negotiations between studios and the union in 1969, there were some discussions regarding runaway productions, but it was ultimately put aside as both sides negotiated over the issue of residuals instead. Additionally, MPSC's business agent at the time, Larry Kilty, was mostly uninterested in issues regarding television animation. Kilty's successor, Lou Appet, had been a vocal labor activist since the 1930s, but for much of his tenure as business agent he was involved in a legal dispute with his predecessor. In 1978, Appet retired, and the executive board that replaced him included individuals who decided to act more confrontationally with studios regarding runaway productions. During contract negotiations that occurred that year, the union included a provision that would have barred studios from subcontracting production work outside of Los Angeles County, California, in all cases "unless ... sufficient employees with the qualifications required to produce a program or series are unavailable". Commercial studios and Disney were not included in this agreement, as at the time they had no plans to outsource their work, and Filmation, a company that prided itself on keeping its production work local, signed a "me-too" agreement to honor the clause. The studios that the union were primarily targeting with this clause were Hanna-Barbera, Bakshi Productions, DePatie–Freleng Enterprises, Marvel Comics, and Ruby-Spears, as well as other smaller companies. While some smaller studios agreed to the clause, others, including Hanna-Barbera, were steadfastly opposed to the clause. Additionally, they believed that, regardless of the negotiations, the union would not call a strike over the issue, as the union had never been involved in one in their history up to that point.

=== 1979 strike and aftermath ===
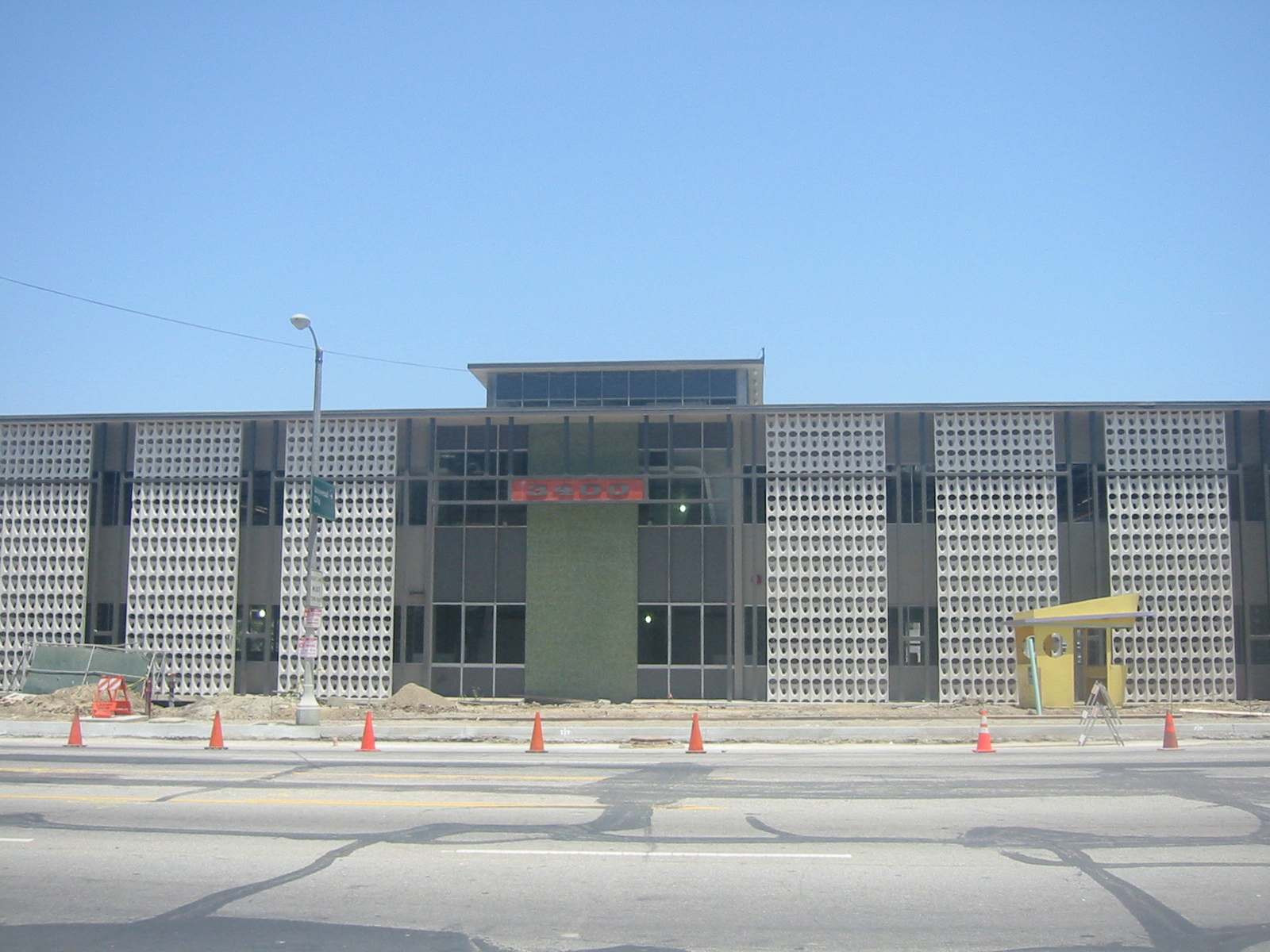
During the 1979 strike, animators picketed outside of Hanna-Barbera's studio on Cahuenga Boulevard (pictured 2007).

Due to the impasse between the union and several studios over the runaway production clause, the union decided to declare a strike on August 7, 1979. The move caught many studio executives by surprise, as this was the union's first ever strike action. At Hanna-Barbera, the main target of the strike, several hundred employees picketed outside of the studio, prompting the Los Angeles Police Department to send officers. Studio cofounder William Hanna expressed sympathy for the strikers, telling one picketer, "I understand exactly what you are going through and sympathize completely". The strike came during a critical time for the studios, as many of the studios were trying to produce content in time for the beginning of the fall television season that September, and a missed deadline could have seriously jeopardized their contracts with the Big Three television networks for Saturday-morning cartoons. Faced with this possibility, the studios agreed to the clause after several days of striking. (Note: Sources vary on the length of this strike, with lengths given as one or two weeks.) The strike and resulting contract, which had a three-year length, were largely seen as a success for the union, and within a week, Ruby-Spears incurred a $50,000 fine from the union for violating the runaway production clause.

Following the strike, many animation studios began to make changes so as to continue outsourcing their productions. For starters, many companies circumvented the clause by simply reducing their local production capacity through firings, allowing them to continue to outsource work to other countries. Prior to 1979, Hanna-Barbera employed many Canadian graduates from Sheridan College, but after the strike, the company revoked their O-1B visas, forcing many of them to return to Canada. While the union had the opportunity to contest visas, it was unlikely that the federal government would have allowed them to veto that many, and Hanna-Barbera told many of these workers that their visas being revoked was the union's fault. At the same time, many studios began to negotiate deals with start-up studios in Canada, South Korea, and Taiwan, regarding outsourcing. Meanwhile, MPSC attempted to strengthen their cause by pressuring their members into not working for studios that had still not ratified a union contract. Animators who did so were fined by the union, leading to some dissension among the union members. By 1982, despite the clause, Hanna-Barbera was outsourcing about two-thirds of their total animation work from studios in South Korea and Taiwan. By the time contract negotiations were set to come up again, many of the studios were willing to fight back against the union's push for greater protections against runaway productions, leading to another labor strike.

In 1982, as the contract was set to expire, negotiators from the union and the studios met to discuss the terms of a new contract. While the negotiators had numerous points of contention regarding such topics as minimum wage, sick leave, and allocating screen credits, the biggest issue by far concerned runaway productions. While the union sought to expand the coverage and enforcement of the clause they had included in the previous contract, many studios wanted the provision removed entirely. At the time, the union represented about 1,600 members and had contracts in place with 45 studios, though a majority of the production work occurred at just a few studios, including Disney, Filmation, Marvel, and Hanna-Barbera. Picketing commenced outside many studios, and work on existing projects was halted. However, the strike lacked support from MPSC's parent union, the International Alliance of Theatrical Stage Employees, and many of the studios were in a better position to weather the strike than they had been in during 1979. As a result, many of the larger studios held out against the union's demands and opted to outlast the union, which struggled to keep up morale among its members, with many of them working under the table for the studios against union orders. In early September, the union allowed members to return to work at smaller studios, and in early October, with many members resigning from the union and returning to work, Local 839 signed an agreement with studios that did not include protections against runaway productions, leading to the strike's end on October 16.

On July 31, about 400 members of MPSC gathered for a meeting to discuss the contract negotiations and hold a vote to authorize a strike. Following heated debates that continued into the night, the members there voted by a two-thirds margin to authorize the union leadership to call for a strike if needed. Additionally, unlike the 1979 strike, where only a few studios were targeted, the union decided that this strike would involve the entire represented animation industry, as they felt that the scope of the strike would apply more pressure on the studios that were strongly opposed to the runaway productions clause. Additionally, the timing of the strike, much like the 1979 strike, would coincide with the leadup to the fall television schedule. After several more days of negotiations, the strike was set to commence on August 5.

== Course of the strike ==
On the morning of August 5, union representatives announced a walkout at all of the unionized studios in the Greater Los Angeles area, initiating the strike. (Note: This date comes from both a 1988 book by professor Allen J. Scott and a 2006 book by animation historian Tom Sito. However, other sources give start dates for the strike as either August 3 or August 6.) Picketing commenced outside of the Disney and Hanna-Barbera studios, marking the first time that the Disney studios in Burbank, California, had been picketed since the 1941 Disney animators' strike. Studios that did little to no production work overseas, such as Marvel and Filmation, were also picketed, and at the latter, executive Lou Scheimer picketed in front of his own studio in solidarity with the animators. MPSC Local 839 also convinced MPSC Local 841 in New York City to honor the strike and stop work on some of the subcontracted work animators were doing there for Hanna-Barbera and Ruby-Spears. Early on in the strike, picketing outside the studios was often fairly lively. Some animators, such as Ward Kimball's son John, played Dixieland jazz, while others roller skated and waved flags and picket signs. Ed Asner, president of the Screen Actors Guild (SAG) union, also visited picketers to encourage them, and noted animators Tom Sito and David Tendlar also picketed. At the time of the strike, the Aurora–Don Bluth co-produced film The Secret of NIMH was about to be released, so animators from Bluth dressed up as characters from the movie while picketing at Disney Studios. All of the animators for the studio had previously worked for Disney, and the picketing almost turned violent when one of the animators jumped on the hood of Disney CEO Ron W. Miller's car. The strike and picketing received relatively little media coverage at the time, due in part to other labor disputes involving SAG and the National Football League Players Association.

At the time of the strike, the MPSC was a local union of the International Alliance of Theatrical Stage Employees (IATSE), which represented workers in many different areas of the film and television industry. While the MPSC had called for the strike, IATSE resisted having members of their other local unions become involved in the animators' strike, due in part to the fact that IATSE was scheduled to have contract negotiations with major studios that November and did not want to jeopardize those talks. Additionally, IATSE president Walter Diehl felt that MPSC officials had exceeded their authority in calling for a strike without direct approval from IATSE. As a result, while the animators continued their strike, production work on animated projects continued at many of the studios, with production workers in departments such as sound editing and camera work crossing the picket line. The MPSC also faced the difficulty of managing a strike without a solid strike fund, and animators who were on strike were unable to qualify for unemployment benefits. As a result, starting around Labor Day weekend, support for the strike among union members gradually began to decline. Fewer strikers attended picket lines as time progressed, and many strikers began to work under the table for studios, despite requests from the union not to. While many smaller studios signed me-too agreements that were sympathetic to the union, the larger studios continued to hold firm in their opposition to the union's runaway productions policies.

In early September, the union agreed to allow some of the smaller studios that had signed agreements with the union to resume animation work to avoid possible bankruptcy. Academic Allen J. Scott gives an end date for the strike of September 9, though in actuality, picketing continued for several more weeks. However, by this time, the likelihood of the union emerging with significant concessions from the major studios was appearing more and more bleak. In late September, representatives from Disney notified union members of a financial core clause in their union contract that would allow them to resign from the union while still receiving some of the benefits reserved for union members. Following this, many Disney and Hanna-Barbera employees began to resign en masse from the union and return to work. By October 13, picketing had more or less petered out as animators crossed the line. Facing the prospect of a disintegrating picket line, union representatives requested contract meetings with studio executives and agreed to contracts with no major protections against runaway productions, which had been the main point of contention during the strike. In addition, the studios requested amnesty for all animators who had worked during the strike and included cuts to seniority benefits. Following the contract agreements, the strike officially ended on October 16.

== Aftermath ==
Several major animation projects were affected by the strike, including Richard Williams's Ziggy's Gift and Don Bluth's adaptation of East of the Sun and West of the Moon. While Ziggy's Gift was completed after the union allowed animators to return to work at smaller studios in September, Bluth's adaptation would never come to fruition. The strike ultimately hurt many of the studios that were involved, and the industry as a whole experienced a slight decline as major production companies became more hesitant to invest in animation. Don Bluth Studios declared bankruptcy in 1985 and later relocated entirely to the Republic of Ireland. According to historian David Perlmutter, the strikes, "which publicly aired grievances that had built up gradually over the previous decade, did incalculable harm to the morale at the Hanna-Barbera studio". The strike also led to a significant decline in the number of animators represented by unions. MPSC Local 839 declined from a record 2,079 members in 1979 to only 866 active members following the strike. In 1985 contract negotiations, the union was removed from IATSE's basic labor contract and made concessions to studios regarding seniority benefits. Additionally, MPSC locals in New York City and Chicago became defunct by 1990. Without the protections against runaway productions, studios increased their outsourcing, and by 2003, 90 percent of animation work for American studios was being performed in Asia.

== Sources ==
- "Film Cartoonists Strike Hollywood Producers". The New York Times. Associated Press. August 6, 1982. p. 4. ISSN 0362-4331. Archived from the original on February 6, 2018.
- Clarke, M. J. (2022). Dragon's Lair and the Fantasy of Interactivity. Lanham, Maryland: Lexington Books. ISBN 978-1-7936-3604-1.
- Lent, John A. (2016). "The Unfunny Tale of Labor and Cartooning in the US and Around the World". In Maxwell, Richard (ed.). The Routledge Companion to Labor and Media. New York City: Routledge. pp. 180–189. ISBN 978-1-135-04249-3.
- Perlmutter, David (2014). America Toons In: A History of Television Animation. Jefferson, North Carolina: McFarland & Company. ISBN 978-1-4766-1488-5.
- Scott, Allen J. (1988). Metropolis: From the Division of Labor to Urban Form. Berkeley, California: University of California Press. ISBN 978-0-520-36068-6.
- Sito, Tom (2006). Drawing the Line: The Untold Story of the Animation Unions from Bosko to Bart Simpson. Lexington, Kentucky: University Press of Kentucky. ISBN 978-0-8131-7148-7.
- Slywotzky, Adrian J.; Morrison, David J. (1997). The Profit Zone: How Strategic Business Design Will Lead You to Tomorrow's Profits. With Bob Andelman. New York City: Times Business. ISBN 978-0-307-42230-9.
- Tomoya, Kimura (2022). "Business and Production: Development and Politics of Outsourcing". In Pellitteri, Marco; Wong, Heung-wah (eds.). Japanese Animation in Asia: Transnational Industry, Audiences, and Success. New York City: Routledge. pp. 71–92. ISBN 978-1-351-34321-3.
