= William Pomerance =

American animator

Mortimer William Pomerance (August 2, 1905 – January 12, 1995) was an American animator who worked for Walt Disney Studios. He worked first as a business manager of cartoonists, and then was a business agent for the Screen Actors Guild. After the Disney strike of 1941, Pomerance and David Hilberman left Disney and started their own animation show studio, TEMPO.

Walt Disney accused Pomerance, along with Herbert Sorrell and David Hilberman, of being a communist in an interview with chief investigator Robert E. Stripling before the House Un-American Activities Committee, although Disney said in the interview that "No one has any way of proving" this.

On 5 February 1952, Pomerance appeared before the HUAC. He refused to answer whether he had been a member of the Communist Party by taking the 5th Amendment.

He was born in Manhattan, the first-born son of Jewish immigrants Harry Pomerance and Esther Perlstein, both from Russia. He died in Madison, Connecticut in 1995.
