= 1937 Fleischer Studios strike =

Animation industry dispute in New York City

- Date: May 7 – October 12, 1937 (5 months and 5 days)
- Location: New York City, New York, United States
- Caused by: Low pay and poor working conditions
- Goals: 12 percent increase in wages; 35-hour work week; Closed shop; Double pay for overtime; Guaranteed time off for vacations and sick days
- Methods: Boycott; Picketing; Strike action
- Result: Union and company agree to compromise labor contract, provisions of which include: 20 percent increase in wages; 40-hour work week; Extra pay for overtime; Guaranteed production quotas; One week of paid time off for vacations and sick days; System for addressing workers' grievances

Parties
Commercial Artists and Designers Union Local 20329	Fleischer Studios

The 1937 Fleischer Studios strike was a labor strike involving workers at Fleischer Studios in New York City. The strike commenced on May 7 of that year and ended on October 12. The strike was the first major labor dispute in the animation industry and resulted in the industry's first union contracts.

Fleischer Studios had been founded in 1929 and grew through the 1930s, having over 150 employees by 1937. Many of these employees were not full animators, but instead worked in lower departments doing more menial tasks such as inbetweening or cel painting. Starting in the mid-1930s, there was growing discontent among the employees in these lower departments due to the poor working conditions and the disparity in pay between them and the animators. By late 1936, the Commercial Artists and Designers Union (CADU) Local 20329 began to organize at the studio, and in April of the next year it submitted a list of demands to Max Fleischer that included increased pay, better working conditions, a closed shop, and a 35-hour work week.

Fleischer refused to recognize the union as legitimate or negotiate with them. Over the next month, 15 employees were fired, with many pro-union employees believing that they were terminated because of their activities with the union. As a result, on May 6, about a hundred union members voted to go on strike the following day. The strike began at 6:30 p.m. on May 7, with picketing outside the studio's building on Broadway in Manhattan. Picketing spread to other locations, including Max and Dave's residences, and the union initiated a boycott of Fleischer cartoons that was somewhat effective in getting the productions pulled from theaters. By June, the National Labor Relations Board began to hold hearings regarding the union's demand for recognition, and a certification vote was held that August, which the union won.

As the strike continued to stretch into the later part of the year, the union's strike fund began to dwindle and morale decreased among the strikers, with some crossing the picket line to return to work. At the same time, however, Paramount Pictures began to pressure Fleischer Studios into accepting a deal that would end the strike and boycott, as they believed that the negative press was beginning to hurt their live-action productions. In late September, the union and company agreed to a tentative deal, and the strike ended on October 12, with the strikers returning to work the following day. The compromise agreement resulted in the union winning many of the key goals that they had pushed for, such as pay increases and guaranteed time off, though the company prevented the studio from becoming a closed shop.

Due in large part to the strike, Max Fleischer announced that the studio would be relocating to Miami, and following the move, the union lost a certification election, leaving the studio ununionized. However, within a few years of the move, the studio experienced financial difficulties related to the production of two full-length animated films and was ultimately absorbed by Paramount Pictures as a subsidiary. The strike precipitated a wave of organizing activity at other animation studios, including the 1941 Disney animators' strike. This upsurge would eventually lead to the unionization of the industry after the Screen Cartoonist's Guild organized all of the major American studios in 1943.

== Background ==
=== Working conditions at Fleischer Studios ===
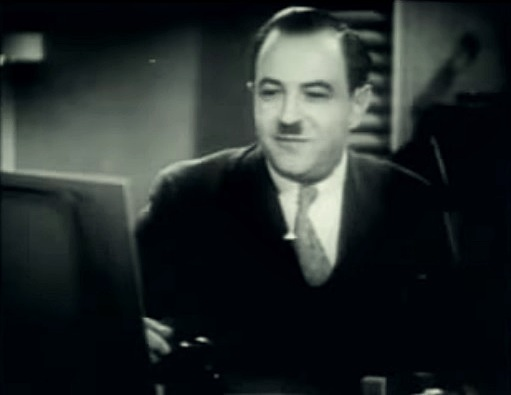
Max Fleischer, cofounder and president of Fleischer Studios, in 1934

In 1929, the animation studio Fleischer Studios was established by brothers Max and Dave Fleischer, who served as the company's president and vice president, respectively. The brothers had been notable pioneers in the early American animation industry, and their new company was founded to produce cartoons to be distributed by Paramount Pictures.

In the early years of the studio, there was a strong sense of camaraderie among the employees, and according to historians Michael Barrier and Richard Koszarski, Max was a paternalistic boss in his role as president. Among the company's early hires were many relatives, such as Max's son-in-law Seymour Kneitel, as well as recent graduates from the Cooper Union and the Art Students League of New York, two of Max's alma maters. Through the 1930s, the studio saw noted success with productions that featured famous characters such as Betty Boop and Popeye. By 1937, the company had over 150 employees working at its New York City studio, (Note: Sources vary on how many employees were working at Fleischer Studios at the time. In a 1987 article published in the journal Film History, historian Harvey Deneroff stated that Fleischer Studios had a production staff of "at least 167" people prior to the strike, not counting Max or Dave. However, in a 1999 book, animation historian Michael Barrier states that the staff at Fleischer Studios was roughly 200 people. A 2005 book by Max's son Richard Fleischer states that the company had "almost 250 employees" at the time, while a 2008 book by film historian Richard Koszarski states that the company had around 175 employees at the time.) which occupied several floors of a building at 1600 Broadway in Manhattan, just north of Times Square.

During the early years of the company, animation in the United States was changing from a primarily artisan-driven industry to one shaped by the concept of the assembly line. For instance, in the 1910s, animation studio Bray Productions operated by having several dozen animators each working on their own cartoon, from start to finish, with help from a few assistants. By the 1930s, due to technological innovations and changes in techniques, the work associated with animation was gradually divided into smaller divisions, with multiple animators and other employees working on different parts of the project. This division of labor also led to the emergence of several distinct departments within studios, such as for cel painting and inbetweening.

Additionally during this time, it became less common for someone to be promoted from a lower-level position, such as inbetweener, to a full animator position. At Fleischer Studios, many new hires started off as inbetweeners, which was considered one of the harshest jobs in the company. Many worked in cramped conditions comparable to a sweatshop, with their workstations not having access to windows or air conditioning. Additionally, the in between department was headed by Edith Vernick, a stern manager whose actions upset many of the inbetweeners, such as timing how long employees were spending in the bathroom and constantly reporting people to the Fleischer Brothers for either not doing their job or not doing their job quickly enough.

On top of the poor conditions, inbetweeners also experienced low pay. Wages at the company had initially been considered fairly good, with animator Shamus Culhane stating that he had had a weekly salary of about $100 while working at Fleischer Studios in 1930. Additionally, yearly bonuses of several hundred dollars were not uncommon.

However, pay across the board decreased as the decade continued, with animator Don Figlozzi stating that his starting salary while working for the company in 1935 was $27 per week. In 1937, studio manager Sam Buchwald stated that the average weekly salary for those in the animation department ranged from $90.80 to $70.59 depending on your position in the department. However, people outside the animation department made substantially less, with inbetweeners and cel painters making an average of $24.45 per week in 1937, and other employees making as low as $17.40 per week. According to Koszarski, the decreased wages may have been a result of the closure of The Van Beuren Corporation, a New York City-based animation studio, in 1936. Because of the low wages, many of the younger employees lived with their parents or had spouses who were also working to support them.

=== Unionization in the animation industry ===
Given the issues regarding pay and working conditions, the studio was, according to animation historian Michael Barrier, "fertile soil for labor unrest". The 1930s saw the first serious attempts by labor unions to organize cartoonists in the film industry. The first major efforts at organizing were at Iwerks Studio in 1931, but these efforts were ultimately thwarted by the studio's management. Organizing efforts at Van Beuren similarly ended in failure for the union.

In 1936, the Artists Union, a New York City-based union, spun off one of its departments into the Commercial Artists and Designers Union (CADU) Local 20329, which was associated with the American Federation of Labor (AFL). CADU immediately began efforts to organize the local animation industry. At the time, unions were not entirely uncommon at the company, as both the studio's camera operators and musicians were organized under local unions, with Dave Fleischer being a member of the latter.

Among the inbetweeners and others involved in the animation process, talks about unionizing had been commonplace since the early 1930s, but in late 1934, discussions became more serious after an inbetweener named Dan Glass contracted tuberculosis. Glass died in January of the following year due to the disease, and many inbetweeners blamed the working conditions for Glass contracting it in the first place. The event was at least the second time that an inbetweener had contracted that disease, as another Fleischer employee was diagnosed with tuberculosis in 1931 and ultimately died in 1935 as well.

Also in 1935, the United States Congress enacted the National Labor Relations Act of 1935, which greatly strengthened the ability of labor unions to organize workplaces. CADU began to focus its attention on organizing the workers at Fleischer in 1936 and, at a meeting of CADU's executive board on November 4 of that year, made the union campaign at Fleischer a top priority.

Organizing efforts began in late 1936 and continued until early 1937, with the final push occurring in March of that year. Among the primary organizers at the studio, only one was an animator, with the rest coming from lower departments such as inbetweening. Among these, Lou Appet, an inbetweener, was considered the most influential, having previously been a member of the Film and Photo League and having many contacts within organized labor.

The organizers recruited almost exclusively from the ranks of the lower departments at Fleischer, with Appet expressing concern that animators in the organizing process may prove to be more of a hindrance than a help. Additionally, many animators were either ambivalent towards the union or were concerned about the left-wing nature of the group. CADU was a popular front organization with ties to the Communist Party of the United States and had a faction consisting of party members, fellow travellers, and communist sympathizers that planned strategy for the union.

In March 1937, CADU began its final push for organizing. On March 20, Fleischer Studios fired employee Carl Wessler and, according to historian Harvey Deneroff, union activists believed that the termination was due to his union activities. Ten days later, CADU initiated a slowdown in response to a speedup that the studio had implemented on work for Popeye the Sailor. According to an article published in the Daily Worker, the speedup had nearly doubled the work rate for inbetweeners, and the slowdown was intended to return production rates to their normal levels.

On April 1, another inbetweener, Marty Taras, was fired for trying to play an April Fools' Day prank on a coworker by giving him a hot foot. While it was illegal to light a match in the studio because of the presence of highly-flammable nitrate film, Taras and some other employees believed the termination was due in part to his union activities.

=== CADU seeks recognition at Fleischer Studios ===
On April 12, the United States Supreme Court ruled that the National Labor Relations Act was constitutional, leading to a notable uptick in organizing activity throughout the country. Shortly after this ruling, CADU representatives went to Max Fleischer and made their first direct demands to the company. Among the union's demands were an end to the speedup, a 12 percent increase in wages, paid time off for sick leave and vacation, double pay for overtime, a 35-hour workweek, and a closed shop. However, believing that the union did not represent the will of the majority of the employees, Max refused to recognize or negotiate with the union.

As a result, on April 19, CADU filed a complaint with the National Labor Relations Board (NLRB), which sent attorney Lester M. Levin to discuss the matter with Fleischer attorney Louis Nizer. Nizer argued that the union's demands would have increased the overhead, which he said was impossible for the company to accommodate because Fleischer Studios had actually not made a profit last year. As a result, Levin urged the company to negotiate with the union on matters not related to overhead and to discuss a possible plan for implementing changes that would affect overhead when they were feasible.

On April 29, the NLRB sponsored a meeting between union and company representatives, during which the company again argued that the union did not represent a majority of the employees. Additionally, the union rejected the company's figures regarding its gross income and the costs that would be associated with the changes pushed for by the union. On May 3, CADU petitioned the NLRB to hold a certification election for the union, but the company resisted holding any election due to the ongoing slowdown.

On May 5, Fleischer representatives once again met with union representatives and once more refused to recognize the union as the legitimate representative of the bargaining unit. Also starting that day and going into the next, Fleischer would fire thirteen employees who were members of the union. The firing of these thirteen, as well as the two fired in the preceding months, was considered the breaking point for the union, and shortly thereafter, they began to plan a strike action. On the night of May 6, about 100 union members voted to approve a strike against the company. The decision to go on strike may have been due in part to a well-publicized concurrent strike that the AFL was supporting in Los Angeles involving 6,000 members of the Federated Motion Picture Crafts (FMPC) union. In total, the 100 or so strikers would represent about half of Fleischer's total staff, and while a vast majority of the animators and animator assistants would not be involved in striking, an organizer for CADU told the soon-to-be strikers that the animators would honor the picket line.

The strike was scheduled to commence the following day, May 7, at 6:30 p.m. That day, a Friday, was chosen because the strikers planned to disrupt the company's 3.5-hour evening work period on that day (which the company mandated in lieu of working on Saturday mornings) and also give other Fleischer employees the weekend to decide where they stood on the union question. This would be the first major labor strike in the animation industry.

== Course of the strike ==
=== Early strike actions ===
The strike commenced as expected on May 7, 1937, at 6:30 p.m., with picketing outside of the studio's offices on Broadway. Many of the picketers carried signs that had humorous slogans referencing the cartoons they worked on, such as, "We Can't Get Much Spinach on Salaries as Low as $15.00 a Week" and "Nudist Betty? How Can I Dress on Max Fleischer's Pay?", and chants of "I'm Popeye the Union Man" were repeated.

Shortly after the strike began, several Fleischer employees who had been on their dinner break returned to the studio to find the picket line blocked entry to the building. Wanting to get back in, some of the non-union employees decided to charge the line, resulting in a scuffle. The fighting lasted for about 30 minutes, during which time several individuals sustained injuries, such as when inker Gill Fox threw his non-union supervisor Frank Paiker into the street. The fighting only stopped when members of the New York City Police Department arrived. More fighting broke out that night after police ordered the picketers to maintain a line near the curb, attracting a crowd of about 2,000 spectators. In the aftermath, several picketers were arrested, including three for assault and either ten or eleven for disorderly conduct. This first night of picketing received widespread coverage from local media, including articles in the Daily News and the New York Herald Tribune.

The violence from the first night led to the studio shutting down for the night. The following day, the company sent a message to everyone in the animation department saying that work would resume on Monday, May 10, with the company providing protection for the animators. While many animators opted to not cross the picket line at that time, 16 did, and work resumed, albeit at a slower rate. Some notable employees who continued to work for Fleischer during the strike included Bob Kane, who would go on to cocreate the comic book character Batman, and Lillian Friedman Astor, the first female to be given a role as a studio animator. (Note: Astor had initially honored the picket line, but returned to work at the studio on May 13.) During the strike, workers at the studio would produce the cartoon Popeye the Sailor Meets Ali Baba's Forty Thieves. Over the course of the next week, many animators began to gradually return to work, and by that Thursday, only seven people from the higher departments of the company were continuing to honor the picket line. By the end of the week, all of these individuals except one, animator Eli Brucker, had returned to work, and the company began to hire strikebreakers to replace the strikers in the lower departments. Brucker would be the only animator to honor the picket line for the duration of the strike.

=== Boycott ===
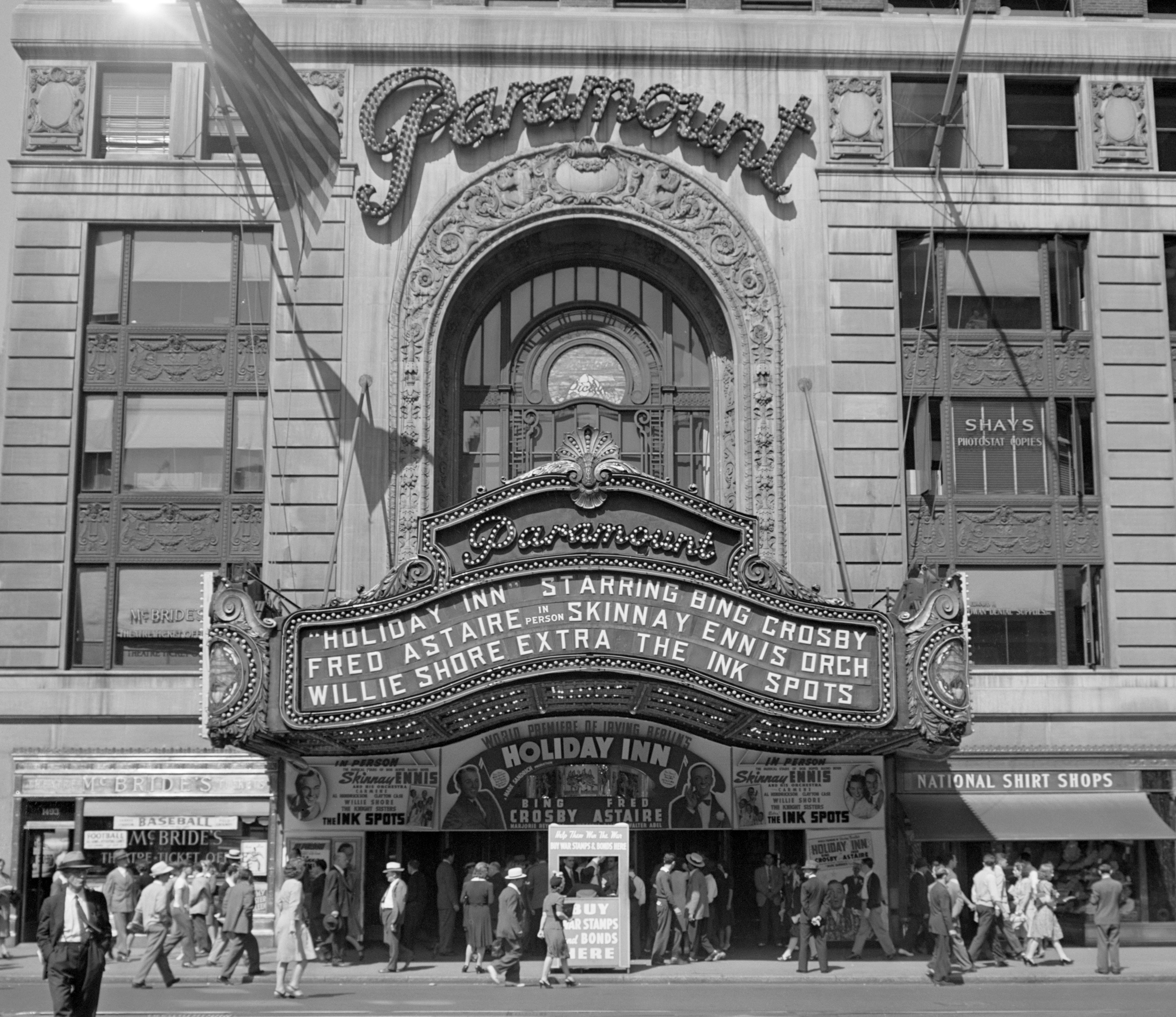
Strikers picketed the Paramount Theatre (pictured 1942) in an effort to have movie theaters stop showing Fleischer productions.

As animators returned to work and production at Fleischer resumed, the strikers turned their attention to another goal: organizing a boycott of Fleischer cartoons. While the union continued to hold many demonstrations near the studio, they also expanded picketing to different locations, including in front of the Windermere Hotel (where Max Fleischer lived), outside of Dave Fleischer's house (which was stink-bombed during the strike), and the Paramount Theatre. The theater was considered a primary target for picketing, with some picketers jeering at screenings of their own cartoons with chants of, "Get that scab picture off the screen!". Other theaters showing Fleischer productions, such as the Roxy Theatre, were also picketed, and through an alliance with the International Alliance of Theatrical Stage Employees (IATSE) Projectionists Local 306, CADU attempted to have the cartoons pulled from IATSE-affiliated theaters. On June 8, Local 306 officially announced its support for the strikers and attempted to have the AFL add Fleischer Studios to its "unfair list", which would have barred union projectionists from screening their cartoons. On June 14, after they were added to the list, Local 306 sent a letter to its 2,000 members ordering them to not screen the cartoons, but shortly after this nationwide boycott was initiated, Fleischer Studios was removed from the unfair list. Some historians have pinned Fleischer Studios' removal on actions from Paramount Pictures, who may have pushed IATSE to cease the boycott. Regardless, the boycott was somewhat effective, as several theaters refused to screen the cartoons. For instance, on July 16, the Loews Theatres chain announced they would not be screening any Fleischer cartoons.

=== NLRB hearings and certification vote ===
Aside from the implementation of the boycott, another goal of the union during this time was to gain certification through the NLRB. The NLRB had been busy handling cases regarding hundreds of other strikes nationwide, but the board finally focused on the Fleischer strike in June. On June 16, the NLRB held its first hearing regarding the certification of CADU. During the hearing, Nizer presented a petition that had been signed by the animators that stated they did not wish to be represented by CADU. The petition was invalidated by the NLRB, who ruled that the signatures had been collected through intimidation, and the union countered that they had collected representation cards from over half of the employees at the studio asking for union representation. On June 19, the NLRB ruled that a certification election would be held that would be open to all artists who were employed by the company on April 30, 1937. Despite stalling from the company, this vote was ultimately held on August 16. The initial vote was 74–0 in favor of the union, though 14 votes were later invalidated because they came from fired workers. Due to delays by the company, the NLRB did not release its final report until October 8.

=== End of the strike ===
The strike continued for several more months until late 1937. As it continued, the union's strike fund began to run low, and while CADU had support from many other entertainment industry unions, morale among the strikers continued to diminish. Though the company and union were holding intermittent meetings, there had not been a major breakthrough, as Max Fleischer continued to reject CADU's claims to be a legitimate bargaining representative for the employees. Over the next several months, some of strikers began to cross the picket line and return to work at the studio.

However, the strike was also having a negative effect on the studio. According to historian Tom Sito, the negative press associated with the boycott and strike were beginning to affect the performance of Paramount Pictures' live-action releases, and while the company was not generally supportive of unions, it began to pressure Fleischer Studios to accept a deal with the union that would end the strike. A Paramount executive became the chief negotiator for the studio, and New York City Mayor Fiorello La Guardia helped oversee a resumption of talks in the later part of the year.

On October 1, The New York Times reported that a day prior, a breakthrough had been made between the company and the union that would see an end to the strike. Though details of the agreement were not made public at the time, the newspaper reported that it was a compromise that would see some wage increases, a 40-hour work week, and other benefits that the union had pushed for. On October 12, representatives for the union and studio met at the offices of Arthur B. Krim, a legal counsel for the company, and agreed to end the strike. (Note: Historian Richard Koszarski gives a slightly different date, writing in a 2008 book that "a compromise resolution [was reached] on October 13".) According to an article published in The New York Times, the strike at the time involved 75 "artists and cartoonists" of the company. With this agreement reached, these employees returned to work the following day.

== Aftermath ==
=== Contract details ===
On October 19, Fleischer Studios officially recognized CADU as the representative of its animation employees. As such, they were able to establish the first union contracts implemented in the animation industry.

The contract was a compromise and did not include all of the initial demands that the union had pushed for. For instance, the studio never became a closed shop, instead operating with about 60 percent of the workforce unionized and the other 40 percent nonunion, and union membership was not necessary for new hires. However, the contract did provide for a standard 40-hour work week, extra pay for overtime work, one week of paid time off for vacation, sick days, wage increases of 20 percent, and guarantees of production quotas from the union. (Note: Sources are slightly unclear on the exact vacation and sick days policy. According to a 2020 article on JSTOR Daily, The New York Times reported that the deal between the union and studio included "vacations and sick leave with pay". Historian Tom Sito, writing about the strike in a 2006 book, stated that Fleischer had "consented to ... one week of paid vacation, holidays, [and] sick leave", among other things.) Additionally, the contract stipulated that any grievances would be addressed by committee under the arbitration of New York County District Attorney Thomas E. Dewey.

=== Later history ===
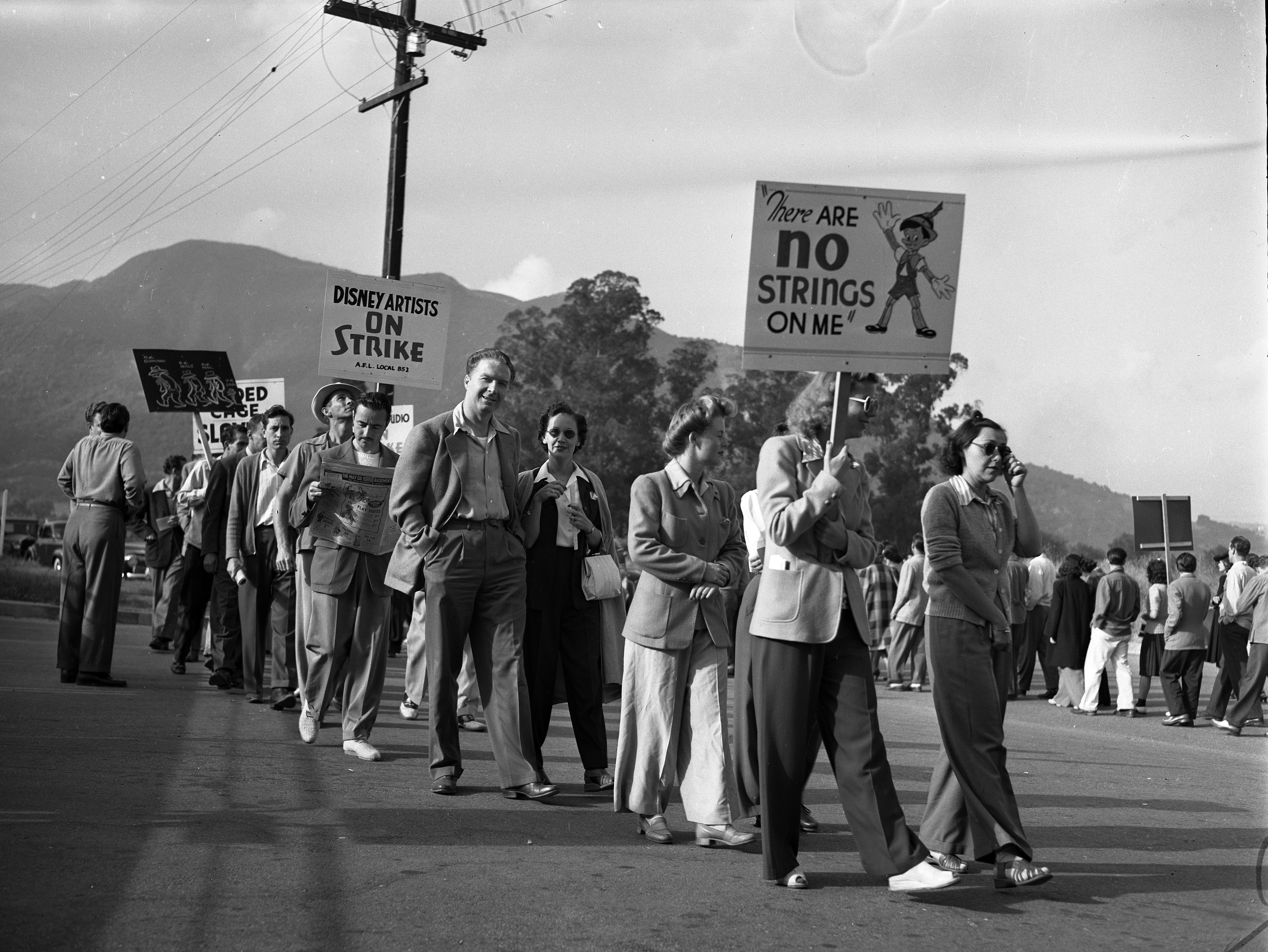
The strike preceded many other organized labor activities in the animation industry, such as the Disney animators' strike in 1941.

The strike severely changed the dynamic in the office; as animator Orsestes Calpini recalls, "the family feeling was gone". Max Fleischer was very affected by the strike, as many long-time Fleischer animators later stated that Max became less involved with the cartoons' production processes following the strike and mostly remained in his office during the workday. About a month after the strike had begun, Max had also entered into discussions with the chamber of commerce in Miami about relocating his studio to the city. On January 21, 1938, Max officially announced the studio's plans to relocate, which occurred less than a year later. Many historians believe that the move was at least partially a response to the union, as Florida was seen as a much less friendly state towards organized labor than New York was, and union presence was much less strong at the new location.

Many of the pro-union employees refused to relocate, and immediately after the move, Fleischer petitioned the NLRB for a new certification election, which the union lost. A later union drive at the Miami studio in 1938 by the United American Artists similarly ended in failure. Ultimately, Fleischer would produce two feature-length films out of Miami, Gulliver's Travels (1939) and Mr. Bug Goes to Town (1941), both of which proved to be financial disappointments for the company. Due to its financial issues, in the early 1940s, it came under the direct ownership of Paramount Pictures, which renamed the studio to Famous Studios and relocated it back to New York City.

The strike preceded a new wave of organized labor activity in the American animation industry, including the 1941 Disney animators' strike at Walt Disney Productions. Other organized labor events during this time included a six-day lockout of animators at Leon Schlesinger Productions in May 1941 and a union drive at the Metro-Goldwyn-Mayer cartoon studio in 1940. Organized labor activity in the industry would not settle down until 1943, when the Screen Cartoonist's Guild managed to organize the animation departments at all major American studios.

== Sources ==
- Arnold, Gordon B. (2017). Animation and the American Imagination: A Brief History. Santa Barbara, California: Praeger. ISBN 978-1-4408-3360-1.
- Barrier, Michael (1999). Hollywood Cartoons: American Animation in Its Golden Age. Oxford: Oxford University Press. ISBN 978-0-19-802079-0.
- Black, James Eric (2016). Walt Kelly and Pogo: The Art of the Political Swamp. Foreword by Mark Burstein. Jefferson, North Carolina: McFarland & Company. ISBN 978-1-4766-2300-9.
- Cohen, Karl F. (1997). Forbidden Animation: Censored Cartoons and Blacklisted Animators in America. Jefferson, North Carolina: McFarland & Company. ISBN 978-1-4766-0725-2.
- Deneroff, Harvey (1987). ""We Can't Get Much Spinach"! The Organization and Implementation of the Fleischer Animation Strike". Film History. 1 (1). Indiana University Press: 1–14. ISSN 0892-2160. JSTOR 3815036.
- Denning, Michael (1997). The Cultural Front: The Laboring of American Culture in the Twentieth Century. New York City: Verso Books. ISBN 978-1-85984-170-9.
- Dial, Donna (Winter 2000). "Cartoons in Paradise: How the Fleischer Brothers Moved to Miami and Lost Their Studio". The Florida Historical Quarterly. 78 (3). Florida Historical Society: 309–330. ISSN 0015-4113. JSTOR 30150575.
- Dobson, Nichola (2009). Historical Dictionary of Animation and Cartoons. Lanham, Maryland: The Scarecrow Press. ISBN 978-0-8108-6323-1.
- Evans, Noell K. Wolfgram (2011). Animators of Film and Television: Nineteen Artists, Writers, Producers and Others. Jefferson, North Carolina: McFarland & Company. ISBN 978-0-7864-8603-8.
- Fleischer, Richard (2005). Out of the Inkwell: Max Fleischer and the Animation Revolution. Lexington, Kentucky: University Press of Kentucky. ISBN 978-0-8131-7209-5.
- Gabler, Neal (2006). Walt Disney: The Triumph of the American Imagination. New York City: Alfred A. Knopf. ISBN 978-0-679-75747-4.
- Hunt, Catherine (January 2, 2020). "The Great Animation Strike". JSTOR Daily. Archived from the original on August 12, 2022.
- Koszarski, Richard (2008). Hollywood on the Hudson: Film and Television in New York from Griffith to Sarnoff. New Brunswick, New Jersey: Rutgers University Press. doi:10.36019/9780813545523. ISBN 978-0-8135-4552-3.
- Langer, Mark (2012). "The Disney–Fleischer Dilemma: Product Differentiation and Technological Innovation". In Neale, Steve (ed.). The Classical Hollywood Reader. New York City: Routledge. pp. 310–320. ISBN 978-0-415-57672-7.
- Lenburg, Jeff (2006). Who's who in Animated Cartoons: An International Guide to Film & Television's Award-winning and Legendary Animators. New York City: Applause Theatre & Cinema Books. ISBN 978-1-55783-671-7.
- Lent, John A. (Autumn 2010). "The global cartooning labour force, its problems and coping mechanisms: the travails of the marginalised cartoonist". Work Organisation, Labour & Globalisation. 4 (2): 160–172. doi:10.13169/workorgalaboglob.4.2.0160. ISSN 1745-641X. JSTOR 10.13169/workorgalaboglob.4.2.0160.
- Lent, John A. (2016). "The Unfunny Tale of Labor and Cartooning in the US and Around the World". In Maxwell, Richard (ed.). The Routledge Companion to Labor and Media. New York City: Routledge. pp. 180–189. doi:10.4324/9780203404119-15. ISBN 978-1-135-04249-3.
- "Movie Studio Strike Voted by 100 Workers; Union Employes of Max Fleischer, Maker of Animated Cartoons, Seek Recognition". The New York Times. May 7, 1937. p. 5. ISSN 0362-4331. Archived from the original on December 6, 2022.
- "2 Film Houses Picketed; Fleischer Studios' Strikers Ask Boycott of Cartoon". The New York Times. May 23, 1937. p. 3. ISSN 0362-4331. Archived from the original on December 6, 2022.
- "Fleischer Studio Strike Ends". The New York Times. October 1, 1937. p. 46. ISSN 0362-4331. Archived from the original on December 6, 2022.
- "Fleischer Strike Ended; Artists and Cartoonists, Out Six Months, Win Settlement". The New York Times. October 13, 1937. p. 11. ISSN 0362-4331. Archived from the original on December 6, 2022.
- Ohmer, Susan (2019). "Classical Hollywood, 1928–1946". In Curtis, Scott (ed.). Animation. New Brunswick, New Jersey: Rutgers University Press. pp. 48–74. doi:10.36019/9780813570273-005. ISBN 978-0-8135-7025-9. S2CID 242609809.
- Pointer, Ray (2017). The Art and Inventions of Max Fleischer: American Animation Pioneer. Foreword by Jerry Beck. Jefferson, North Carolina: McFarland & Company. ISBN 978-1-4766-6367-8.
- Sito, Tom (2006). Drawing the Line: The Untold Story of the Animation Unions from Bosko to Bart Simpson. Lexington, Kentucky: University Press of Kentucky. ISBN 978-0-8131-7148-7.
- Sito, Tom. "Guild History". The Animation Guild, IATSE Local 839. Archived from the original on November 24, 2022.
- Worth, Rik (2021). The Creators of Batman: Bob, Bill and The Dark Knight. Philadelphia: White Owl. ISBN 978-1-5267-7764-5.
- Yu, Kie-Un (1999). "Global Division of Cultural Labor and Korean Animation Industry". In Lent, John A. (ed.). Themes and Issues in Asian Cartooning: Cute, Cheap, Mad, and Sexy. Bowling Green, Ohio: Bowling Green State University Popular Press. pp. 37–60. ISBN 978-0-87972-779-6.
