= Screen Cartoonist's Guild =

American labor union for animators formed in 1937

The Screen Cartoonist's Guild (SCG) was an American labor union formed in 1937 in Los Angeles, California. The SCG was formed in the aftermath of protests at Van Beuren Studios and Fleischer Studios, and represented workers and resolved issues at major American animation studios such as Walt Disney Productions.

== Prehistory ==
The onset of the Great Depression in 1929 as well as bank holidays enacted by Franklin D. Roosevelt in 1933 made it impossible for Wall Street investors to supply the major Hollywood film studios with the cash flow they needed. Studio executives cut salaries for their employees but took no cuts for themselves, leading to a mass spree of unionization in Hollywood. The executives retaliated by firing union members and picketers at a steady rate.

In Hollywood, animators were originally unionized under the International Alliance of Theatrical Stage Employees, which was founded in 1914. Noticing that there was not a union to solely represent animators, Bill Nolan unsuccessfully tried to form such a union in 1925 named "Associated Animators" and a group formed by Grim Natwick, Shamus Culhane, and Al Eugster in 1932 was disbanded after executives began to threaten its employees and many members lost their jobs.

In New York City, where studio unions were generally better off, Bill Littlejohn, along with Hicks Lokey, John McManus, and Jim Tyer, formed the Unemployed Artists Association, which became the Commercial Artists and Designers Union (CADU) due to Roosevelt's policies, and later the Animated Motion Picture Worker's Union (AMPWU). These two unions were the most immediately approached in New York when employees were mistreated.

In 1933, the Van Beuren studio's animation director, Harry Bailey, also tried to organize a union within the studio. Bailey had been influenced by the socialist ideas of cartoonist Otto Soglow, with whom he had collaborated to produce two pilot episodes of an animated series adapting his comic strips for the screen, entitled “A Dizzy Day” and “AM to PM”. What's more, Bailey and his fellow animators were fed up with Van Beuren forcing them to work unpaid overtime to get the cartoons out on time. However, animator George Stallings, also a union member, reported his colleagues to Van Beuren, who decided to fire them all.

=== Van Beuren protest ===
In 1935, Van Beuren Studios fired Sadie Bodin, an inker and scene planner, for pro-union sentiment, though she argued that the Wagner Act prevented them from doing so. Van Beuren ordered employees to take unpaid overtime or risk being fired, and supervisor Burt Gillett treated them very poorly, having fired Bodin to replace her with someone "whose attitude was better" Bodin and her husband responded by protesting, becoming the first people to picket an animation studio. Inspired by Bodin's protest, the AMPWU brought legal action against Van Beuren, but lost. Gillett subsequently fired union members and had them blacklisted so that they could never regain work.

=== Fleischer strike ===
Bodin's strike led key Van Beuren employees to leave for Fleischer Studios. The studio gave poor wages but generous bonuses and threw extravagant parties, though Max Fleischer's controlling behavior offended immigrant workers who had escaped dictatorships. When artist Dan Glass died due to poor working conditions, the CADU blamed his death on Fleischer and began protesting outside the studio. Fleischer retaliated by firing union sympathizers and quoting sentiment from anti-union employees in print.

At Fleischer, the first coordinated strike at an animation studio began in 1937 after the company fired thirteen pro-union employees. The strike lasted several months before Fleischer's partner Paramount Pictures intervened and demanded they sign a contract with the CADU. This led to better working conditions and a paid week of vacation, as well as holidays and screen credits, and previously fired employees were re-hired. Fleischer also relocated the studio to Florida because it was reportedly an "anti-union state".

=== Founding ===
In 1937, the Hollywood Screen Cartoonists held their first union meeting and adopted a formal constitution in 1939, changing their name to "Screen Cartoonist's Guild" (SCG).

However, the union's founding in 1937, with Littlejohn as union president, has been attested by various sources, with this development caused by events at Van Beuren and Fleischer. The same year, the National Labor Relations Board denied a studio challenge to the union. The SCG became a chapter of the Conference of Studio Unions and was awarded jurisdiction over all matters pertaining to animation studios by the NLRB.

== History and impact ==
By 1940 the Guild had 115 members, representing cartoonists at Metro-Goldwyn-Mayer and Walter Lantz Studios. It was able to "significantly raise" the wage paid to animators through collective bargaining. The union won recognition in 1941, and Herbert Sorrell became union president the same year.

The SCG was joined throughout its life by animators from Van Beuren and Fleischer (and its successor, Famous Studios), as well as Leon Schlesinger Productions (later Warner Bros. Cartoons), the Metro-Goldwyn-Mayer cartoon studio, and the Screen Gems cartoon studio, all of whom it secured contracts with.

From 1940 to 1941, animators at Walt Disney Productions were successfully organized, as vice president Frank Tashlin joined the company as a storyman and encouraged animators to join. The SCG would be instrumental in the strike at Walt Disney Productions in 1941, which began when studio head Walt Disney fired Art Babbitt for being a member of the SCG, prompting more than 200 employees to go on strike.

The strike ended with a victory for the Guild and defeat for Disney and the company union known as Federation of Screen Cartoonists (FSC), following the end of the strike. The strike resulted in half the studio's employees leaving for other studios, such as David Hilberman and John Hubley, who formed United Productions of America. Disney himself was left with a permanent distrust of pro-union employees, and blamed Babbitt among others for the strike, though he rehired a number of animators in t eh following yeaes.

In 1944, the union sent organizers to New York City to form a local chapter, Local 1461. Three years later, in 1947, the Guild had an unsuccessful twenty-eight-week strike against Terrytoons, Inc. despite receiving support from other unions. Terrytoons hired students from New Rochelle High School as scabs, and Paul Terry outlasted strikers with a "large backlog of unreleased films". The strike was later described as the animation industry's "most devastating blow" for animators.

On January 18, 1952, the union was succeeded by "The Motion Picture Screen Cartoonists Guild, IATSE Local 839", also known as "Motion Picture Screen Cartoonists Guild" for short. It still exists today and has been named The Animation Guild, I.A.T.S.E. Local 839, or "The Animation Guild", since 2002.
