= Don Figlozzi =

American cartoonist

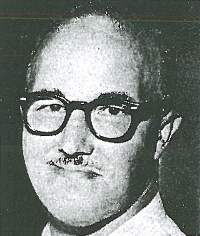
- Don Figlozzi
- Born: Donald Figlozzi; January 17, 1909 Brooklyn, New York City, United States
- Died: June 21, 1981 (aged 72)
- Areas: Animator, Cartoonist, Illustrator
- Notable works: Popeye, FIGure This, Scramblegrams, Thumper, Jiminy Cricket
- Awards: Time magazine As Seen By

Don Figlozzi (January 17, 1909 – June 21, 1981) was an American animator and cartoonist. A veteran of Fleischer Studios and member of the National Cartoonists Society, he spent the first half of his career in animation and the second half at the New York Daily News, where his cartoons, signed "Fig," became a fixture. Historian Harvey Deneroff of the Savannah College of Art and Design suggests that Figlozzi may have created the first animations to be used on television.

== Biography ==
=== Personal life and education ===
Born in Brooklyn, New York City to Italian immigrant parents Frank and Constantina, Figlozzi began his artistic education with the Landon cartoon course and attended Pratt Institute, Cooper Union and Art Students League of New York. He married Anne Giannatasio (January 13, 1908 - March 16, 2005) and had two children, Constance (November 25, 1940 - ) and Donald Jr. (August 8, 1944 - ). He has five living grandchildren, Thomas and Donald Shelford & Peter, Lindsey, and Brett Figliozzi. It's been suggested that "Figlozzi" was Don's surname used exclusively for his professional animation career.

=== Fleischer Studios ===
Figlozzi joined Fleischer Studios in May, 1931 where he worked as an animator on Popeye films. He also is photographed in "Drawing the Line: The Untold Story of the Animation Unions from Bosko to Bart Simpson" during the Fleischer Studios Strike of 1937.

=== World War II ===
During the Second World War, Figlozzi worked on training films for the Army Signal Corps.

=== WPIX TV ===
As Graphic Art Director for WPIX TV, Figlozzi was one of the first television animators.

=== Disney ===
While employed at The Walt Disney Company, Figlozzi worked as an animator. Some of the most notable animations he worked on were Thumper (Bambi) and Jiminy Cricket (Pinocchio).

=== Terrytoons ===
Figlozzi participated in the 1947 Terrytoons strike.

=== Daily News ===
For the New York Daily News, Figlozzi illustrated columns for writers Bob Sylvester and Charles McHarry. Figlozzi also worked as an editorial cartoonist and created an ongoing cartoon gag strip entitled, FIGure This.

== Awards ==
Figlozzi was a two-time prize winner (second and third place) in Time magazine's As Seen By cartoon contest. Member, National Cartoonists Society.

== Bibliography ==
- Scramblegrams by Tom Figlozzi and Don Figlozzi. Ace Books, 1973.

=== Illustrations for books by others ===
- Animals and Statues I Have Interviewed, by Phil Santora. Phaedra, 1969.
FIGure This cartoon panel by Don Figlozzi
