= David Hilberman =

American animator

- Born: 18 December 1911; Cleveland, Ohio
- Died: 5 July 2007 (aged 95); Palo Alto, California
- Education: Case Western Reserve University B.S.(ArtEd) 1934. UCLA M.A.(Theater Arts) 1965

David Hilberman (18 December 1911 – 5 July 2007) was an American animator and one of the founders of classic 1940s animation. An innovator in the animation industry, he co-founded United Productions of America (UPA). The studio gave its artists great freedom and pioneered the modern style of animation. As Animator and Professor Tom Sito noted: "Arguably, no studio since Walt Disney exerted such a great influence on world animation." He and Zack Schwartz went on to start Tempo Productions which became an early leader in television animated commercial production. In short, he played an important role in the new directions the art form took in the 1940s and '50s.

Hilberman studied art in schools in both Detroit and Cleveland. The Great Depression began when he was 18, and with its huge economic dislocation promoted political activism and consequential legislation: the Social Security Act and the National Labor Relations Act. In 1932 he traveled with friends to Russia, where all of their parents had been born. He stayed for six months in Leningrad, worked in a theater and studied stagecraft and art. Unable to speak Russian and finding Russians too dogmatic, he returned to Cleveland. There he resumed his education at Case Western Reserve University, earning a B.S. in Art Education in 1934 and continuing his involvement with theater at the Cleveland Play House eventually securing a job teaching art in high school. He married, became aware of a talent search for artists being held by Walt Disney Productions and submitted a portfolio. He became one of 29 artists hired out of several thousand applicants. Hilberman began in animation as an assistant animator and shortly was asked by Bill Tytla to join his unit working on the dwarf sequences in Snow White and the Seven Dwarfs, Disney's first animated feature film. The film, which had been a major gamble for the Walt Disney studio became a huge artistic and financial success and lead to a series of pioneering animation features. He went on to do layout on six short films and was then put in charge of pre-production layout for Bambi. In preparation, he learned how to use the studio's huge new multiplane camera used for the panoramas through the woods. He was proud of the work done at the studio. The rise of Hitler in Germany during the 1930’s was of growing concern for many. David, (pen name Mark David) with Jerome Lawrence Schwartz worked together in late 1939 to produce Oscar the Ostrich. It featured a screaming Hitler Ostrich who gathered up followers and loose sand dunes. Oscar was the good ostrich who stuck his head in the sand and ignored the screaming, dangerous one. Then the Hitler Ostrich seized the sand dune to the East. This clearly referred to the September 1, 1939 German seizure of Poland which marked the start of World War II, even as Stalin still supported Germany. Oscar and his buddies decide it is time to get angry and fight back.

Many artists had worked long unpaid hours on Snow White. Instead of overtime pay, virtually all employees were promised bonuses for their efforts, some large, some small. Many were never paid as much of the revenues from the feature went into building the new Disney Studio in Burbank. Importantly, the Studio's revenues had been cut in nearly half by the WWII in Europe. By early 1941 artists were being let go without explanation, even when senior and very skilled. These layoffs lead directly to the Disney animators' strike in the spring of 1941. In an FBI interview three weeks after the strike began, Disney blamed these staff cuts for the strike. Nevertheless, two weeks later Disney placed an ad in Hollywood trade papers stated the strike was caused by Communist agitation! Many of these issues are discussed in Karl F. Cohen's 1997 book: Forbidden Animation.

The after effects of the Studio's economic downturn and the strike included a major exodus of talent from Disney. In 1943 David Hilberman, Zack Schwartz and Steve Bosustow, set up a new studio, which became UPA. Notable early films to which he contributed included his most political films: Point Rationing of Foods which was shown nationwide as part of the war effort, then for FDR's 1944 re-election campaign: Hell-Bent for Election and subsequently: Brotherhood of Man. The pamphlet, Races of Mankind on which Brotherhood was based, was written by two eminent anthropologists, Ruth Benedict and Gene Weltfish and based on U.S. Army studies of recruits in WWI. It was nevertheless banned by the War Department as subversive due to its assertion that racial differences were superficial.

Hilberman was drafted into the army toward the end of World War II and a year after his return to civilian life he sold his interest in UPA. The end of the war and the 1946 elections brought a sharp right turn in American politics. Exploiting fears of the Soviet Union (unrealistic given the decimation of the Soviet Union by the war and Stalin's policies) the Second Red Scare began. In 1947 the House Un-American Activities Committee met in Hollywood. Walt Disney blamed the strike on communist agitators rather than acknowledging unexplained layoffs of artists previously attributed to the studio's financial stress. Disney named several artists, including Hilberman as Communists. Similarly, other movie studio executives named many union activists as Communists and the attack on the unions turned into a nasty witch-hunt. Best known for the 10 Screen Writers denounced as Communists, the Hollywood Blacklist began. The social justice issues which motivated the Hilbermans to attend some Communist Party meetings in the late 1930s and early 1940s—worker's rights, unions, women's rights, an end to racism – were regarded as subversive. One of the FBI special agents who was involved chasing commies found himself thinking "Gee this isn't all that bad. They want equal rights in the union for minorities and blacks and equal pay for women. What the hell is wrong with this?"

In 1947 David Hilberman and Zack Schwartz founded another studio in New York City: Tempo Productions which went on to become a very successful producer of television animated commercials of high artistic merit. In December 1953 at the height of the red scare the newsletter Counterattack, listed the companies that had used Tempo and urged a boycott of the firm. Abruptly, orders for commercials were withdrawn and all employees had to be laid off. The business was sold and the family traveled to Europe the next spring as David looked for work in Western Europe. Their boat trip to Europe overlapped with the Army-McCarthy hearings, which were to mark the beginning of end of the witch-hunt, if not its substantial political and personal after-effects. After talking to film producers and directors in France and Italy, Hilberman chose work in London for over a year where he set up a TV animated commercial department for Pearl and Dean and directed Calling All Salesmen. The family returned home in late 1955.

Back in New York, working as Transfilm, he produced and directed Man of Action in 1955. In 1962 he directed Little Blue and Little Yellow, based on the book of the same name by Leo Lionni which had an anti discrimination theme. He also directed a fanciful PR film for ESSO, designed by Ronald Searle: Energetically Yours with old Disney & UPA associates Bill Melendez and Art Babbitt doing the animation at their respective companies. Melendez took the simplified modern animation style and use of artist's individual characters pioneered at UPA to the Peanuts TV series. Back in Los Angeles, at Churchill Films he designed and directed educational films: Quest for Freedom, Ancient New World, Transportation, Land of Immigrants, Hooked and Girl to Woman. He also worked at Hanna-Barbera doing layout for a variety of projects, a connection which began at Disney's and lasted many years. In 1963 David returned to school part-time earning an MA in Theater Arts from UCLA in 1965. He was invited to teach at San Francisco State University in 1967, where he taught animation and helped start the Film department. A number these films are available on YouTube and other internet sites.

After leaving SF State in 1973 he and his wife lived in the SF Bay Area for many years. He made several films on Synanon including The People's Ranch, What is Synanon? and The Synanon Wedding, worked with Jeff Hale at Imagination, Inc. and designed sets for the Palo Alto Children's Theater. He resumed doing layout work for Hanna-Barbera, which included a six-month stint in Japan coordinating production in East Asia for The Smurfs. His wife Libbie's warmth and caring held the family together through many difficult moves. She died on 11 July 2006, David a year later on 5 July 2007. They are survived by 3 children, 9 grandchildren and 8 great-grandchildren.

He was Jewish. He expressed his religion primarily by a commitment to social justice, racial and gender equality and direct support for workers through health insurance, unions and similar programs and policies.

== Awards ==
- Annie Awards, 1992, Winsor McCay Award - For Distinguished Lifetime Achievement to the Art of Animation: https://web.archive.org/web/20130102013212/http://annieawards.org/20th-annie-awards
- Motion Picture Screen Cartoonists Golden Award for 50 years service to the craft, 1986.
- Four CINE Golden Eagle awards
