= Willis Pyle =

- Born: Willis Acton Pyle; September 3, 1914; Lebanon, Kansas, U.S.
- Died: June 2, 2016 (aged 101); New York City, New York, U.S.
- Occupation: Animator

Willis Acton Pyle (September 3, 1914 – June 2, 2016) was an American animator known for his work with Walt Disney Animation Studios, including Pinocchio (1940), Fantasia (1940), and Bambi (1942), as well as UPA's Mr. Magoo, where he co-created the iconic character, and the short film, Gerald McBoing-Boing (1950), which won an Academy Award for Best Animated Short Film in 1951.

Pyle later enjoyed a long career as a freelance animator on such projects as Raggedy Ann and Andy: A Musical Adventure (1977), Halloween Is Grinch Night (1977), several Peanuts television specials, and Cathy's Valentine.

== Biography ==
=== Early life ===
The son of a farmer, Willis Pyle was born on September 3, 1914, near Lebanon, Kansas, and was raised in a sod house in Colorado. Pyle's younger brother was actor Denver Pyle, who was best known for his starring role as Uncle Jesse on CBS television series The Dukes of Hazzard, from 1979 until 1985. However, Pyle was not the nephew of, nor related to, journalist Ernie Pyle.

=== Career ===
Pyle enrolled as an art student at the University of Colorado Boulder, while working as a commercial illustrator for Gano-Downs department store in Denver, when he found an employment poster for animators at Walt Disney Studios. Pyle left from Colorado in 1937 and relocated to Los Angeles and was initially hired by Disney as an office boy in 1937. His first feature film was Pinocchio in 1940, in which he worked as an assistant animator under Milt Kahl, one of Disney's Nine Old Men. In a 2010 interview with the Coloradan Alumni Magazine, explained how he animated Pinocchio, "The character had to act — raise its eyebrows, turn and jump and react to other characters. And the way you could do it was by looking at yourself in a mirror to see what that expression looked like." Pyle also worked as an assistant animator on Fantasia in 1940 and Bambi in 1942.

Shortly after completing work on Bambi, Pyle left Disney to briefly take a position as an animator at Walter Lantz Productions, where he worked on Woody Woodpecker short films. He then served as part of the United States Army Air Forces' First Motion Picture Unit, based in Culver City, California, during World War II. Willis Pyle next worked as an illustrator for Vogue magazine following his time with the U.S. Army Air Force.

Willis Pyle next joined United Productions of America (UPA), where he helped create one of UPA's best known characters, Mr. Magoo. His work at the studio was noticed by Ted Geisel, better known as Dr. Seuss, who hired Pyle as an animator on his 1950 UPA animated short film, Gerald McBoing-Boing, which won an Academy Award for Best Animated Short Film in 1951.

Pyle's career as a freelance animator spanned several decades. His credits included the 1977 animated film, Raggedy Ann and Andy: A Musical Adventure, as well as several Charlie Brown animated specials. (Pyle and Peanuts animator Bill Melendez had originally worked together on Gerald McBoing-Boing).

Pyle later donated a portion of his archives and papers to the Lilly Library at Indiana University Bloomington.

== Death ==
Willis Pyle died at his penthouse apartment on Broadway in Manhattan, New York City, on June 2, 2016; he was 101 years old.

He was predeceased by his wife, Virginia Morrison, whom he married in 1946.

== Selected filmography ==
- Pinocchio (1940) - assistant character animator: Pinocchio
- Fantasia (1940) - assistant animator
- Bambi (1942) - assistant animator
- Gerald McBoing-Boing (1950)
- The Famous Adventures of Mr. Magoo (1964)
- Raggedy Ann & Andy: A Musical Adventure (1977)
- Halloween Is Grinch Night (1977)
- Cathy's Valentine (1989)
