= Herbert Sorrell =

American labor leader

Herb Sorrell
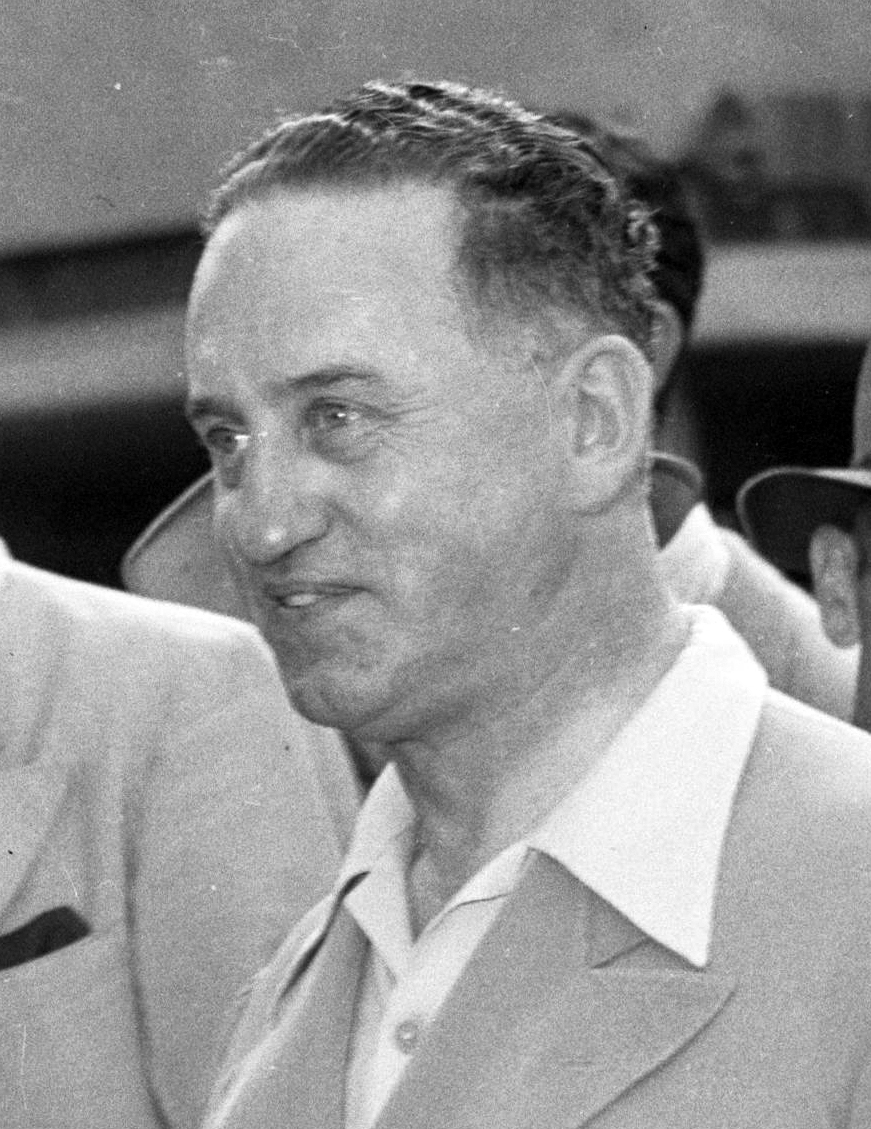
- Sorrell in 1946
- Born: Herbert Knott Sorrell; April 18, 1897; Deepwater, Missouri, U.S.
- Died: May 7, 1973 (aged 76); Burbank, California, U.S.
- Occupations: Trade union organizer and activist

Herbert Knott Sorrell (April 18, 1897 – May 7, 1973) was an American labor leader and Hollywood union organizer. He headed the Conference of Studio Unions (CSU) in the late 1940s, and was the business manager of the Motion Picture Painters union, Local 644 until the 1950s.

== Early life ==
Sorrell was born in Deepwater, Missouri on April 18, 1897. At age twelve, he found employment in a sewer pipe factory in Oakland, California, and later in Oakland he worked with union leader Harry Bridges. At one point he tried boxing as a career. He moved to Los Angeles in 1925, became a scenery painter for the movie studios, and joined the local painters union. In April 1937, his union local was one of those unaffiliated with IATSE which formed the Federation of Motion Picture Crafts (FMPC). The same month, the FMPC went on strike against the major studios. In the picket line at Warner Brothers, Sorrell's determination earned him the rank of "picket captain", and the attention of Blayney F. Mathews, head of Warner Brothers' security, who had him arrested. He was never charged and was released several days later. This notoriety led to his subsequent position as the business representative for the painter's union and as a result he became one of the major negotiators who settled the strike in June.

== Conference of Studio Unions ==
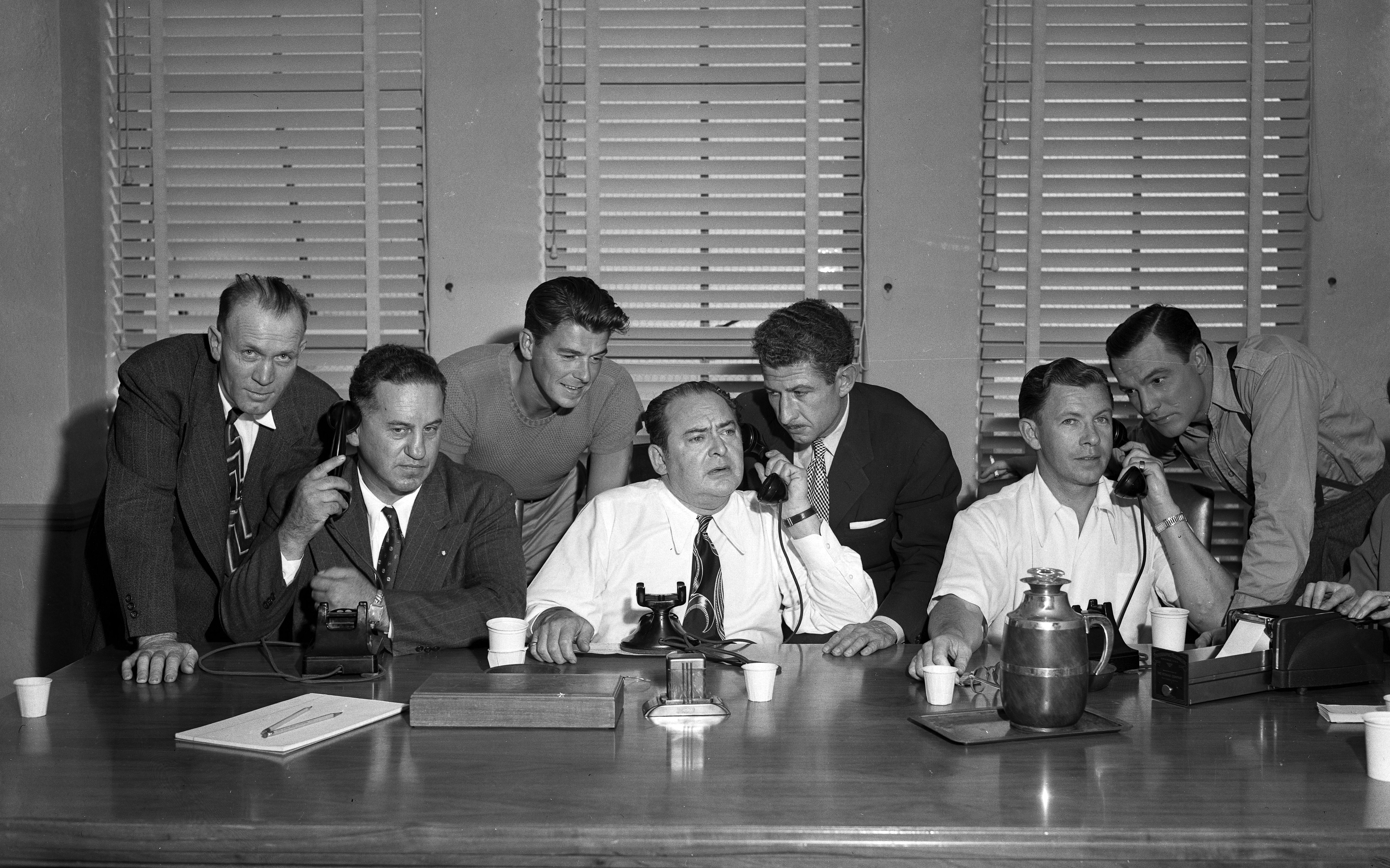
Seven actors and studio workers during a telephone conference held in the aftermath of Hollywood Black Friday in which American Federation of Labor officials denied issuing a "clarification" which set off the film strike, October 26, 1946. (L-R): James Skelton, Herbert Sorrell, Ronald Reagan, Edward Arnold, Roy Tindall, George Murphy, and Gene Kelly.

In May 1941, Sorrell called for a strike against the Disney film studio. The strike was supported by the newly formed Screen Cartoonist's Guild, and the cooperation resulted in the organization of the Conference of Studio Unions (CSU), which Sorrell proceeded to lead.

In 1945, Sorrell lead the CSU strike that led to Hollywood Black Friday. The strike originated from a dispute between two unions, CSU and IATSE, over which one of them had union authority over 77 set decorators. After an National Labor Relations Board vote and War Labor Board decision in favor of CSU, the studios refused to recognize CSU's bargaining authority, and the strike began. After violence on Black Friday, the strike quickly settled. However, collusion between the IATSE leadership and the studios resulted in a lockout which developed into a strike in September 1946, which the CSU did not have the financial strength to endure. Sorrell was convicted of "contempt of court" and "failure to disperse" in connection with the 1945 strike but acquitted of all of the felony charges. which included "inciting to riot" and "rioting."

== Politics ==
During the 1940 Democratic Party presidential primaries, Sorrell joined a left-wing slate pledged to lieutenant governor Ellis E. Patterson for president. They opposed incumbent Franklin D. Roosevelt on the grounds he was focusing too much on foreign affairs and not enough on domestic unemployment. The Patterson slate lost to Roosevelt's by a margin of fifteen to one.

== Tenney Committee testimony ==
In 1941 and again in 1946, Sorrell testified before the California Legislature's Joint Fact-Finding Committee on Un-American Activities (the Tenney Committee), but there was insufficient evidence that he was tied to the Communist Party. The CSU strike of 1945, which Sorrell had led, was actively opposed by the Communist Party USA. In 1947, Walt Disney testified before the House Committee on Un-American Activities that he "believed at that time that Mr. Sorrell was a Communist because of all the things that I had heard and having seen his name appearing on a number of Commie front things." Sorrell was also deemed responsible for the rumor of Disney's anti-Semitism, possibly as retaliation for Disney's testimony to the committee on Un-American Activities.

In 1953, in an actor's lawsuit, Sorrell testified that he was never a communist, but he accepted money from them, and "felt free to spend communist money".

== Death ==
Sorrell died in Burbank, California on May 7, 1973.

== Sources ==
- Pintar, Laurie C. (1996) "Herbert K. Sorrell as the grade-B hero: militancy and masculinity in the studios" Labor History 37(Summer): pp. 392–416
- "Painters Strengthen Labor Ties" in December 1941 Screen Actor Magazine.
