= Disney animators' strike =

1941 organized labor action

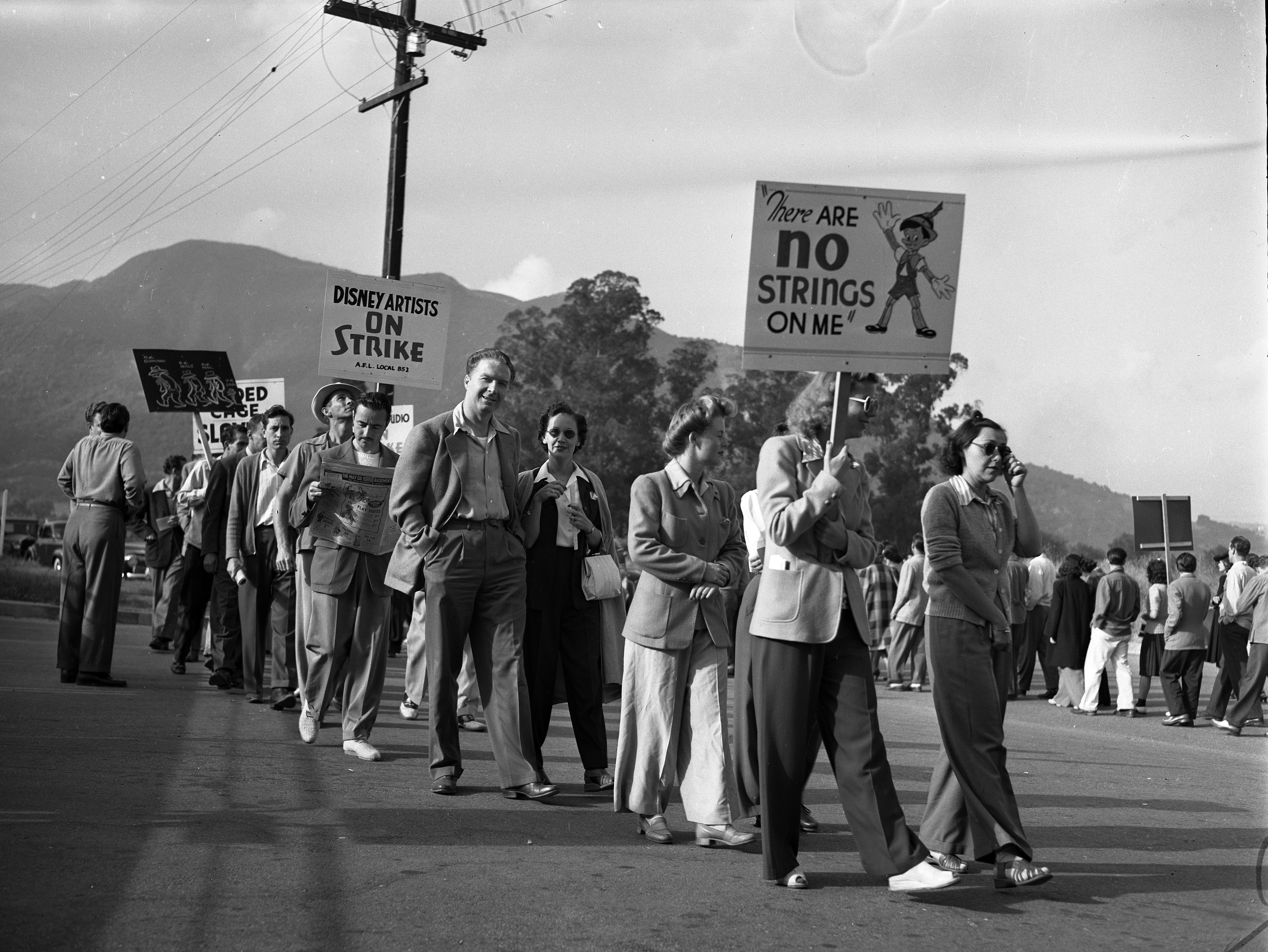
- Striking Disney animators at Walt Disney Productions, Burbank, in May 1941
- Date: May 29 – September 21, 1941 (3 months and 26 days)
- Location: Burbank, California
- Caused by: The unionization of animators by Herbert Sorrell and the firing of 17 unionized employees, including Art Babbitt.
- Goals: Increase pay for the unionized writers and animators who worked on Disney animated films. Fair treatment of union members, primarily against the retaliatory firing of union members.
- Methods: Striking, picketing
- Result: Walt Disney and WDP management concede and sign a contract with the Screen Cartoonist's Guild. Many cartoonists refuse to be rehired and decide to work for other animation studios, shrinking the Disney talent pool significantly.

Parties
Screen Cartoonist's Guild	Walt Disney Productions

Lead figures
Herbert Sorrell	Walt Disney

The Disney animators' strike was a 1941 American film industry work stoppage where unionized employees of Walt Disney Productions picketed and disrupted film production for just under four months.

The strike reflected anger at inequities of pay and privileges at Disney, a non-unionized workplace. Walt Disney responded to the five-week strike by firing many of his animators, but was eventually pressured into recognizing the Screen Cartoonist's Guild (SCG) by signing a contract with them, which involved, amongst other concessions, rehiring those who wished to return.

== History ==
=== Background ===
In the 1930s, a rise of labor unions took place in Hollywood in response to the Great Depression and subsequent mistreatment of employees by studios. Among these unions was the Screen Cartoonist's Guild (SCG), which formed in 1938 after the first strike at an animation studio occurred, the 1937 Fleischer Studios strike. By 1941, SCG president Herbert Sorrell had secured contracts with most of the major animation studios in California (including MGM Cartoons, Walter Lantz Productions, Screen Gems and George Pal Productions) except for Disney and Leon Schlesinger Productions. Schlesinger gave in to the SCG's requests to sign a contract after his own employees went on strike for six days, but upon signing reportedly asked, "What about Disney?"

Disney's animators had the best pay and working conditions in the industry, but were discontented. Originally, 20 percent of the profits from short cartoons went toward employee bonuses, but Disney eventually suspended this practice. Disney's 1937 animated film Snow White and the Seven Dwarfs was a financial success, allowing Disney to construct a new, larger studio in Burbank, California, financed by borrowing. At the Burbank studio, a rigid hierarchy system was enforced where employee benefits such as access to the restaurant, gymnasium, and steam room were limited to the studio's head writers and animators, who also received larger and more comfortable offices. Individual departments were segregated into buildings and heavily policed by administrators.

The box-office failures of Pinocchio and Fantasia in 1940 forced Disney to make layoffs, although Disney rarely involved himself in the hiring and firing process with those who were not atop the pay chain. The studio's pay structure was very disorganized, with some high-ranking animators earning as much as $300 a week (equivalent to $6,567 in 2025), while other employees made as little as $12 (equivalent to $263 in 2025). According to then-Disney animator Willis Pyle, "there was no rhyme or reason as to the way the guys were paid. You might be sitting next to a guy doing the same thing as you and you might be getting $20 a week more or less than him". Staff were also forced to put their name to documents which stated that they worked a forty hour week, while their actual hours were much longer. In addition there was resentment at Walt Disney taking credit for their work, and employees wished to receive on-screen credit for their art.

=== Labor action ===
The SCG and Sorrell started meeting on a regular basis at the Hollywood Hotel from the start of 1941 to hear Disney workers' grievances and plan a unionization effort. Many animators, including Art Babbitt, grew dissatisfied and joined the SCG under the guidance of SCG vice president and Disney employee Frank Tashlin. Babbitt was one of Disney's best-paid animators, though he was sympathetic to low-ranking employees and openly disliked Disney. Babbitt had previously been a senior official in the Disney company union, the Federation of Screen Cartoonists, but had become frustrated due to being unable to effect change in that position. Disney saw no problem with the structure, believing it was his studio to run and that his employees should be grateful to him for providing the new studio space.

Sorrell, along with Babbitt and Bill Littlejohn, approached Disney and demanded he unionize his studio, but Disney refused. In February 1941, Disney gathered all 1,200 employees in his auditorium for a speech:

In the 20 years I've spent in this business I've weathered many storms. It's been far from easy sailing. It required a great deal of work, struggle, determination, competence, faith, and above all unselfishness. Some people think we have a class distinction in the place. They wonder why some people get better seats in the theatre than others. They wonder why some men get spaces in the parking lot and others don't. I have always felt, and always will feel that the men that contribute most to the organization should, out of respect alone, enjoy some privileges. My first recommendation to the lot of you is this; put your own house in order, you can't accomplish a damn thing by sitting around and waiting to be told everything. If you're not progressing as you should, instead of grumbling and growling, do something about it.

The assembly was poorly received, and more employees joined the SCG. Tensions between Disney and Babbitt reached a peak when Disney began to see Babbitt as having personally betrayed him by becoming a union leader. Disney fired Babbitt along with 16 other employees who were members of the SCG.

=== Strike ===
The next day, on May 29, more than 200 members of the studio staff went on strike, during the production of the 1941 film Dumbo, against the advice of Sorrell, who wanted more time to organize workers before striking. Other studios' animators, such as those from Schlesinger, offered their support during the strike. Disney retaliated by depicting some of the striking employees in caricature in Dumbo as antagonistic circus clowns, and on one occasion even attempted to "attack" a picketing Babbitt, but was stopped by studio guards. In turn, the strikers maintained a carnival-esque atmosphere on the picket line, using humor and artistic skills in producing signs, and at one stage carrying a mock guillotine in a march and using it to behead a mannequin of Gunther Lessing, Walt Disney's attorney. They also received support from other unions, with unionized staff at Technicolor, Williams and Pathé refusing to process Disney films, and consumer advocacy group the League of Women Shoppers picketed theaters exhibiting them. The Disney strikers also extended solidarity to strikes in other sectors, such as producing signs for a United Auto Workers strike at North American Aviation in Los Angeles.

The strike was resolved when the National Labor Relations Board asked Disney to sign a union contract and he agreed. Disney was returning from a goodwill tour of Latin America to produce animated films as part of the Good Neighbor policy, allowing tensions to cool in his absence - although the SCG kept up pressure in the run-up to Disney's departure: the union's business agent Bill Pomerance obtained details of union leaders in the cities that were on Disney's itinerary via the National Maritime Union. He then contacted the State Department to inform them that pickets of Disney and his films were being organized in South America, arguing that "the Disney company (should) comply with American standards of fair treatment of labor" as a condition of Walt Disney being allowed to represent the United States as a goodwill ambassador. As a result the U.S. Conciliation Service brought both sides together in talks in Washington DC: an agreement was struck, which included the reinstatement of employees fired before the strike, equalization of pay, a clearer salary structure and a grievance procedure.

== Aftermath and notable departures ==
The strike left the studio with only 694 employees. In addition to Babbitt, the studio lost the following staff:

- Bill Tytla (who later moved to Terrytoons and Famous Studios), Walt Kelly, Tyrus Wong, Virgil Partch, Hank Ketcham, Don Lusk, Joey Lockwood, Art Palmer, James Escalante, William Hurtz, Clair Weeks, Moe Gollub, Willis Pyle, T. Hee, George Baker, Hicks Lokey, Stephen Bosustow, Don Tobin, Eddie Strickland, Tony Rivera, Cy Young, Jesse Marsh, Chris Ishii, Aurelius Battaglia, Lynn Karp, Jules Engel, and Frank Fullmer.
- Kenneth Muse, Preston Blair, Ed Love, Walt Clinton, Claude Smith, Otto Englander, Webb Smith, Chuck Couch, and Bernard Wolf left for the MGM Cartoon Studio.
- Frank Tashlin (who later moved to Warner Bros., which had previously employed him as a director from 1936 to 1938), already head of production for Columbia's Screen Gems, hired Emery Hawkins, Ray Patterson (who later moved to MGM), Louie Schmitt (later an animator and character designer for Tex Avery at MGM), Howard Swift, Phil Klein, John Hubley, David Hilberman (who later moved to Warner Bros.), Zack Schwartz, Phil Duncan, Leo Salkin, Grant Simmons (who later moved to MGM), Basil Davidovich (who later moved to Warner Bros.), Jim Armstrong, Bernard Garbutt, William Shull (later an animator at MGM), Chic Otterstrom, Sam Cobean, Adrian Woolery, and Volus Jones. Bob Wickersham, who left Disney to work at Fleischer Studios before the strike, was also hired.
- Babbitt, Hawley Pratt, Bill Melendez, Art Heinemann, Ray Patin, Phil Eastman, Don Christensen, Jack Bradbury, and Gene Hazelton left for Leon Schlesinger Productions (which would later be known as Warner Bros. Cartoons, Inc. after Schlesinger sold the studio to Warner Bros.). Russ Dyson, Cornett Wood and Maurice Noble would also join the studio years afterward.
- Milt Schaffer, preceded briefly by Couch and joined years later by Hawkins, Pat Matthews, Dick Lundy and Heinemann, moved to Walter Lantz Productions.
- Bosustow, Hilberman, and Schwartz would later establish United Productions of America, which made up mostly of ex-Disney animators including Melendez, Hubley, Engel and Pyle.

Fleischer Studios (later transitioned to Famous Studios) and Terrytoons are the only major animation studios that did not benefit from hiring displaced Disney personnel immediately after the strike, mainly due to them being located on the East Coast. However, they still were able to gain some talent in the following years, including Bill Tytla, Isadore Klein, Morey Reden, T. Hee and Paul Busch.

In the years following World War II, Lusk, Hee, Jones, Weeks, Marsh, Duncan, Schaffer, Hawkins, Salkin, Patin, Davidovich, Lokey, Battaglia, and Bradbury returned to the studio for varying lengths of time. Disney was forced to rehire Babbitt after he brought an unfair labor practices suit against the studio, though Babbitt eventually left for good in 1946.

Disney never forgave the participants and subsequently treated union members with contempt, arguing in a letter that the strike "cleaned house at our studio" and got rid of "the chip-on-the-shoulder boys and the world-owes-me-a-living lads". Testifying to the House Un-American Activities Committee, Disney alleged that communism had played a major role in the strike, and many of the participants were blacklisted, including Art Heinemann, an art director on Fantasia. Heinemann went out on strike in sympathy with the animators and was subsequently fired and blacklisted, his name removed from Fantasia's credits.

== See also ==
- 1984 Disneyland strike
- List of Hollywood strikes
  - NewDeal4Animation
