= Hollywood Black Friday =

1945 labor strike and riot in Burbank, California

Hollywood Black Friday, or Hollywood Bloody Friday, is the name given, in the history of organized labor in the United States, to October 5, 1945. On that date, a six-month strike by the set decorators represented by the Conference of Studio Unions (CSU) boiled over into a bloody riot at the gates of the Warner Bros. studios in Burbank, California, led by Herbert Sorrell. The strikes helped the passage of the Taft–Hartley Act in 1947 and led to the eventual breakup of the CSU and reorganization of the rival International Alliance of Theatrical Stage Employees (IATSE) leadership.

== Background ==
The Conference of Studio Unions was then an international union, led by the United Painters organizer Herbert Sorrell. It represented the Carpenters, United Painters 644, Screen Cartoonists Guild, Electricians [IBEW 40], Laborers, Set Decorators Guild, and several other crafts working for the studios in Hollywood.

Seventy-seven set decorators broke away from IATSE to form the Society of Motion Picture Interior Decorators (SMPID) and negotiated an independent contract with the producers in 1937. The SMPID joined the CSU in 1943, and the CSU represented the SMPID in their contract negotiations. After the producers stalled the negotiations for nine months, IATSE questioned CSU jurisdiction over the set decorators, which led to a further five-month delay while the CSU and the IATSE fought over jurisdiction. When the producers refused to acknowledge an independent arbitrator appointed by the War Labor Board's assessment that the CSU had jurisdiction over the set decorators in February 1945, it set the stage for the strike. After the strike in 1946, the CSU would be strategically locked out of the studios by the producers, influenced by the IATSE leader, Roy Brewer. He would then lead the false charge of the infiltration of communists within the labor unions focused on Sorrell and the CSU. Some of the unions were forced to return to work, but others had the IATSE take over their duties to any who did not return and thus expelled the United Painters and the Carpenters Union.

== Strike ==
An estimated 10,500 CSU workers went on strike in March 1945 and began picketing all the studios resulting in delays of several films, including David O. Selznick's epic Duel in the Sun and the Cole Porter story Night and Day. Unfortunately for CSU, the studios had some 130 films on the shelves and so comfortably sat out a strike for the time being. Regardless, Disney, Monogram, and several independents bargained with CSU, but Columbia, Fox, MGM, Paramount, RKO, Universal, and Warner did not.

Despite orders from their leadership and threats of fines and revocation of their cards, many members of IATSE refused to cross the picket lines or to do work that was normally filled by members of the CSU.

== Black Friday ==
By October, money and patience were running low as some 300 strikers gathered at Warner Bros.' main gate on October 5, 1945. Temperatures were abnormally warm for the already hot LA autumn. When non-strikers attempted to report for work at 6:00 in the morning, the barricades went up, and tensions flared. As replacement workers attempted to drive through the crowd, their cars were stopped and overturned.

Reinforcements arrived on both sides as the picket increased to some 1,000 people and Glendale and Los Angeles Police came to aid the Burbank Police and Warner Security attempting to maintain the peace. When more replacement workers attempted to break through to the gate, a general melee ensued as strikers mobbed them, and strikebreakers responded by attacking the strikers with chains, hammers, pipes, tear gas, and night sticks. Warner security rained more tear gas down from the roofs of the buildings adjoining the entrance. Warner firefighters sprayed the strikers with fire hoses. By the end of the day, some 300 police and deputy sheriffs had been called to the scene and over 40 injuries were reported.

The picketers returned the following Monday with an injunction barring the police from interfering with the strike, and Warner retaliated with its own injunction limiting the number of pickets at the gate. Although the violence would continue through the week, national exposure forced the parties back to the bargaining table and resulted in an end to the strike one month later but the CSU victory was a Pyrrhic one, where contentions over wording dictated by an AFL arbitration team would lead to further questioning as to CSU and IATSE jurisdiction on the set.

== Aftermath ==
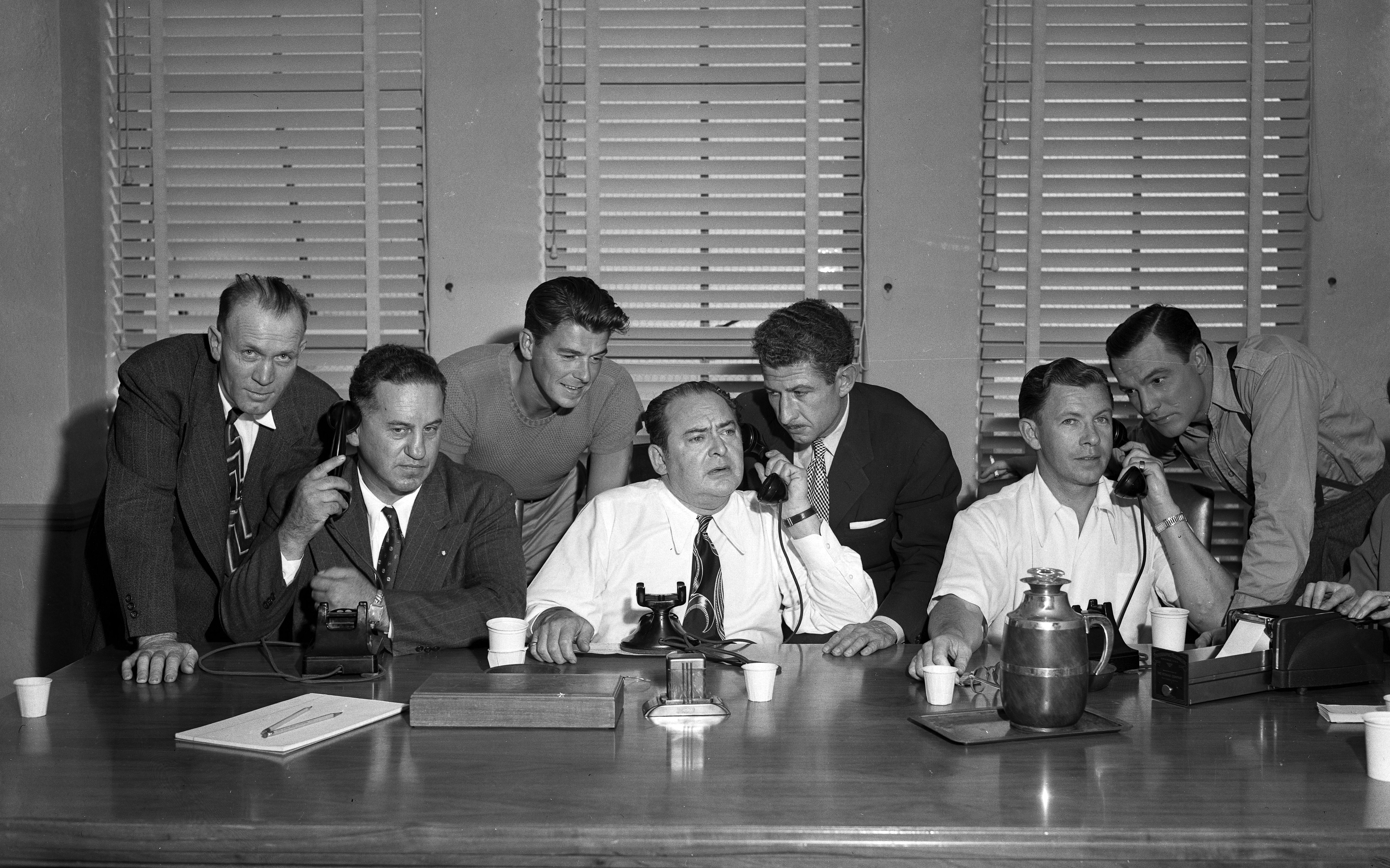
Seven actors and studio workers during a telephone conference in which American Federation of Labor officials denied issuing a "clarification" which set off the film strike, October 26, 1946. (L-R): James Skelton, Herbert Sorrell, Ronald Reagan, Edward Arnold, Roy Tindall, George Murphy, and Gene Kelly.

After meetings between IATSE and representatives of the studios in early September 1946 had guaranteed IATSE workers to fill the positions of existing CSU employees, the studios came up with a plan to force CSU out of the studios once and for all. On September 23, the studios reassigned all the CSU members from construction supervisors, foremen, and maintenance men to work as journeymen carpenters on "hot set," a position in which many of the men had not worked many years. The violation of their job descriptions was a cause for a union grievance.

The men protested and refused and so were given pre-prepared paychecks for their time and effectively sent home and then locked out. The pickets went back up, and the CSU was forced to assume the crushing burden of another strike.

Despite a walkout by members of IATSE 683 film laboratory technicians in solidarity with CSU, open fighting between CSU members and studio security forces and a vote by the Screen Actors Guild that effectively turned its back on CSU hampered the CSU's efforts. The CSU would never recover from the strike, which had lasted some 13 months before it voted to permit long-unemployed, impoverished members, and supporters to cross the picket line and return to work. The CIO also came to the aid of the struggling CSU members and assisted them in finding jobs in other CIO industries.

The disorder in Hollywood helped prompt the Taft-Hartley Act, which was passed by the help of the studios' lobbying and by accusations of the alleged Communist Party membership of Herb Sorrell, the leader of the CSU during the strike, which prompted Sorrell and the CSU to descend slowly into obscurity.

Thomas Pynchon would later use some of the events as backstory in his novel Vineland.
