= Richard Koszarski =

American film historian (b. 1947)

Richard Koszarski (born December 18, 1947) is a film historian.

He was the founder of Film History: An International Journal, and served as editor-in-chief from 1987 to 2012. He is a professor emeritus of English and film at Rutgers University in New Jersey.

His collection of material on the early history of the Universal Pictures is held in the Library of Congress.

He was the chief curator at the American Museum of the Moving Image in New York. Koszarski is the museum curator at the Barrymore Film Center.

== Books ==
- Hollywood Directors, 1941-1976 (editor) (Oxford University Press, 1977)
- An Evening’s Entertainment: The Rise of The Silent Feature Picture (University of California Press, 1990)
- Von: The Life and Films of Erich von Stroheim (Limelight, 2001), original title The Man You Loved to Hate: Erich Von Stroheim and Hollywood
- Fort Lee, the Film Town (Indiana University Press, 2004)
- Hollywood on the Hudson: Film and Television in New York from Griffith to Sarnoff (Rutgers University Press, 2008).
- “Keep ‘Em in the East”: Kazan, Kubrick and the Postwar New York Renaissance (Columbia University Press, 2021)
