= The Animation Guild =

Professional guild and union of animators

- The Animation Guild and Affiliated Optical Electronic and Graphic Arts
- Nickname: TAG
- Predecessor: Screen Cartoonist's Guild
- Founded: 1952
- Headquarters: Burbank, California
- Location: United States
- Members: 2,550 (2010)
- President: Danny Lin
- Vice President: Roger Oda
- Key people: Steve Kaplan (Business Representative); Jeanette Moreno-King (Recording Secretary); David DePasquale (Sergeant-at-Arms)
- Parent organization: International Alliance of Theatrical Stage Employees
- Affiliations: AFL-CIO
- Website: www.animationguild.org

The Animation Guild (TAG) is a professional guild and union of animation artists, writers, technicians, and production workers. The full name of the organization is The Animation Guild and Affiliated Optical Electronic and Graphic Arts, Local 839 of the International Alliance of Theatrical Stage Employees and Moving Picture Technicians, Artists and Allied Crafts of the United States, its Territories and Canada, American Federation of Labor-Congress of Industrial Organizations/Canadian Labour Congress.

== History ==
=== Before the Guild ===
Before the founding of the union on January 18, 1952, under the name "The Motion Picture Screen Cartoonists Guild, IATSE Local 839", known as "Motion Picture Screen Cartoonists Guild" for short, the push to unionize the animation industry in the United States came from the Screen Cartoonist's Guild. It was a union which held its first union meeting in 1937 and won recognition in 1941.

From 1940 to 1941, animators at Walt Disney Studios were successfully organized, with a victory for the Guild and defeat for Disney and the company union known as Federation of Screen Cartoonists (FSC), following the end of the strike. Later, in 1944, the Guild sent organizers to New York City to form a local chapter, Local 1461. In 1947, the Guild had an unsuccessful twenty-eight-week strike against Terrytoons, Inc. despite receiving support from other unions. Terrytoons hired students from New Rochelle High School as scabs, and Paul Terry outlasted strikers with a "large backlog of unreleased films". The strike was later described as the animation industry's "most devastating blow" for animators.

=== Early years ===
In 1958, the Guild successfully organized workers at Hanna-Barbera Productions. At that time, the union organized many animators across the industry.

In August 1979, the Guild struck for ten days against Ruby-Spears Productions, Hanna-Barbera Productions, and DePatie-Freleng Enterprises, with the studios agreeing to in-studio staffing levels before some work can be subcontracted outside of the U.S. The next year, 1980, the Guild established the American Animation Institute which aimed to provide education about animation craft and art taught by professionals in animation industry.

In August 1982, the studios refused to renew the 1979 agreement with Guild. This resulted in the Guild's 1,600 members going on strike against all animation studios within Los Angeles, California. The strike ended with studios refusing to address the issues related to runaway productions raised by the strike.

In 1987, the Guild founded the Society for Animation Studies, which began holding an annual conference two years later, and later published a peer-reviewed journal, Animation Studies. In Spring 1995, the Guild signed a contract with DreamWorks Animation. It was reported in August 1999 that the Guild, which had 2,500 members at the time, was trying to unite with animators from other countries rather than competing against them.

=== 2002-present ===
In July 2002, the union changed its name to "The Animation Guild". In November of the same year, Nickelodeon Animation Studios signed a collective bargaining agreement with the union for the first time, bringing in workers from Dora the Explorer and SpongeBob SquarePants. The following year, Guild members ratified a new collective bargaining agreement with major animation companies, which lasted until August 2006.

In October 2004, DPS Film Roman animators voted to join the Guild by a 166-20 vote, with a contract ratified in January 2005. Later, in 2009, the Guild negotiated bargaining terms for streaming television when it was "something of a quirk," leading to a push by some in the animation industry, and the Guild itself, for better working conditions for those in the industry. Sideletter N entered into the collective bargaining agreement with the Guild, in 2015, outlined improved working conditions for streaming media. The same year, the Guild also inked a three-year contract with the Alliance of Motion Picture and Television Producers. In May 2019, the Guild ratified contracts for animators at Nickelodeon. The following month, the guild’s efforts to win workers at Shadowmachine, which were working on BoJack Horseman, were successful. Later, workers for the company would again vote to be part of the guild in May 2022.

Animators who worked on Rick and Morty and Solar Opposites filed a petition, in February 2022, for a union election with the National Labor Relations Board so they could join the guild. According to the Guild, Williams Street and 20th Television Animation did not voluntarily recognize the entire unit as the Guild proposed, leading to a negotiation before recognition. Previously, in September 2014, the crew of Rick and Morty ratified a new labor agreement with the Guild, following a successful organizing effort.

In January 2022, it was announced that workers for the studio of Titmouse, Inc., in New York, had organized under the Guild. It was the first time the union represented an animation studio "outside of LA County". Following the union becoming public, Titmouse management chose to voluntarily recognize the union and negotiate with the Guild "in good faith". Previously, in October 2020, Titmouse Vancouver had become the first animation studio in Canada to join a union, joining the newly founded Animation Guild IATSE Local 938.

The Guild ventured into its first organizing campaign outside of the continental United States when workers for the Puerto Rican based animation studio Gladius Animation Studios unionized with them in July 2023. It was also reported, in July 2023, that there were efforts by 88 production workers at Warner Bros. Animation and Cartoon Network to join the Guild, with their request for voluntary recognition of the union by management.

== Governance ==
The Animation Guild is governed by its membership, which meets every two months. To supervise the Guild's affairs, every three years the membership elects a sixteen-person Executive Board by secret mail ballot. The Executive Board meets every month. The key executives on the Board are: Jeanette Moreno King (as President), Teri Hendrich Cusumano (as Vice President), and Steve Kaplan (as Business Representative). The Business Representative is the only paid, full-time elected official of the Guild, which also has a paid staff. All other Board members work at studios under the Guild's jurisdiction.

=== Collective bargaining agreements ===
The Animation Guild negotiates and enforces collective bargaining agreements, or CBAs, with companies employing persons under its jurisdiction. The present contract the Guild has with studios will expire in mid-2024, even though animated productions may be impacted by the 2023 SAG-AFTRA strike.

== Jurisdiction ==
The Animation Guild's jurisdiction is determined by its parent body, the IATSE, and as defined in its CBA.

=== Work jurisdiction ===
The Guild covers all artistic, creative and technical job categories in the animation process, with the following exceptions:

- Animation camerapersons are under the jurisdiction of IATSE Local 600.
- Track readers and soundpersons are under the jurisdiction of IATSE Local 695.
- Animation editors are under the jurisdiction of the Motion Picture Editors Guild, IATSE Local 700.
- Animation voice actors are covered by the Screen Actors Guild-American Federation of Television and Radio Artists.
- Generally speaking, animation directors of theatrical features are not covered, as they are considered management due to their ability to hire and fire employees, but animation directors in other media such as television are covered.
- Although animation producers, production managers and non-creative support personnel are not covered under the Guild CBA, employers will sometimes sign a so-called "non-affiliate" agreement that allows them to cover them for purposes of health insurance and pension.
- Although most animation writers are under the Animation Guild's jurisdiction, some are covered by the Writers Guild of America West.
- So-called "freelancers" are covered under the CBA if they are working as employees of a signator employer. Bona fide independent contractors are not covered, since they are not employees of the company for which they perform work.

Although the Guild's traditional jurisdiction was limited to those working on animated films, in recent years the Guild has expanded to the point where a significant percentage of its members are employed in motion picture computer graphics. Today, both 2D and 3D artists work under the Guild's jurisdiction, both in animation and live action.

=== Geographical jurisdiction ===
All of the Animation Guild's current collective bargaining agreements are with employers in southern California. The IATSE and other IA locals have jurisdiction over animation in other areas of the United States and Canada. In December 2021 it was reported that the union had "close to 6,000 active members" and that most lived in Los Angeles, California. Previously, in 2016, it was reported that the Guild had "nearly 4,000" members.

== Membership requirements ==
Membership in the Animation Guild can be acquired either through employment or organizing.

Animation artists, writers and technicians who are hired by employers signed to Guild CBAs will be required to join the Guild after thirty days' employment. The one-time initiation fee consists of two weeks' minimum scale wages for the job category in which the applicant has been hired. Dues are charged quarterly and are also based upon the scale rate for the job category as of the beginning of the quarter. As of August 2008 the highest dues rate is $101.00. In April 2018, the Guild announced that 25% of workers under its union contract were women, the first time for the union.

Animation artists, writers and technicians who are employed by companies that do not have TAG agreements, may become members if and when the company is organized. Potential members may assist the Guild in its organizing efforts by signing a confidential representation card. After the employer is organized and signed to a collective bargaining agreement, employees often are brought into membership without initiation fees.

== NewDeal4Animation ==
#NewDeal4Animation was a Tweet protest created in November 2021 by The Animation Guild, advocating for equal pay between animation writers and live-action writers, also citing the effects of COVID-19 on their jobs. In a February 2021 video campaign featuring various animation writers, the Guild said that animation writers received less than half of live-action writers' pay. Other cited issues included changes in the workflow of studios, such as increased workload, out of proportion with shorter development time from technological advances; and paying animators for large first seasons at a lower rate (pay boosts are given for renewed series), but splitting that season into multiple smaller seasons for viewers. Negotiations for a new contract between TAG and the Alliance of Motion Picture and Television Producers—their last contract expired on October 30, 2021—began in November 2021, and in May 2022, a new contract was agreed to, with retroactive additional wages and special clauses for remote work.
