= Tom Sito =

American animator, animation historian and teacher

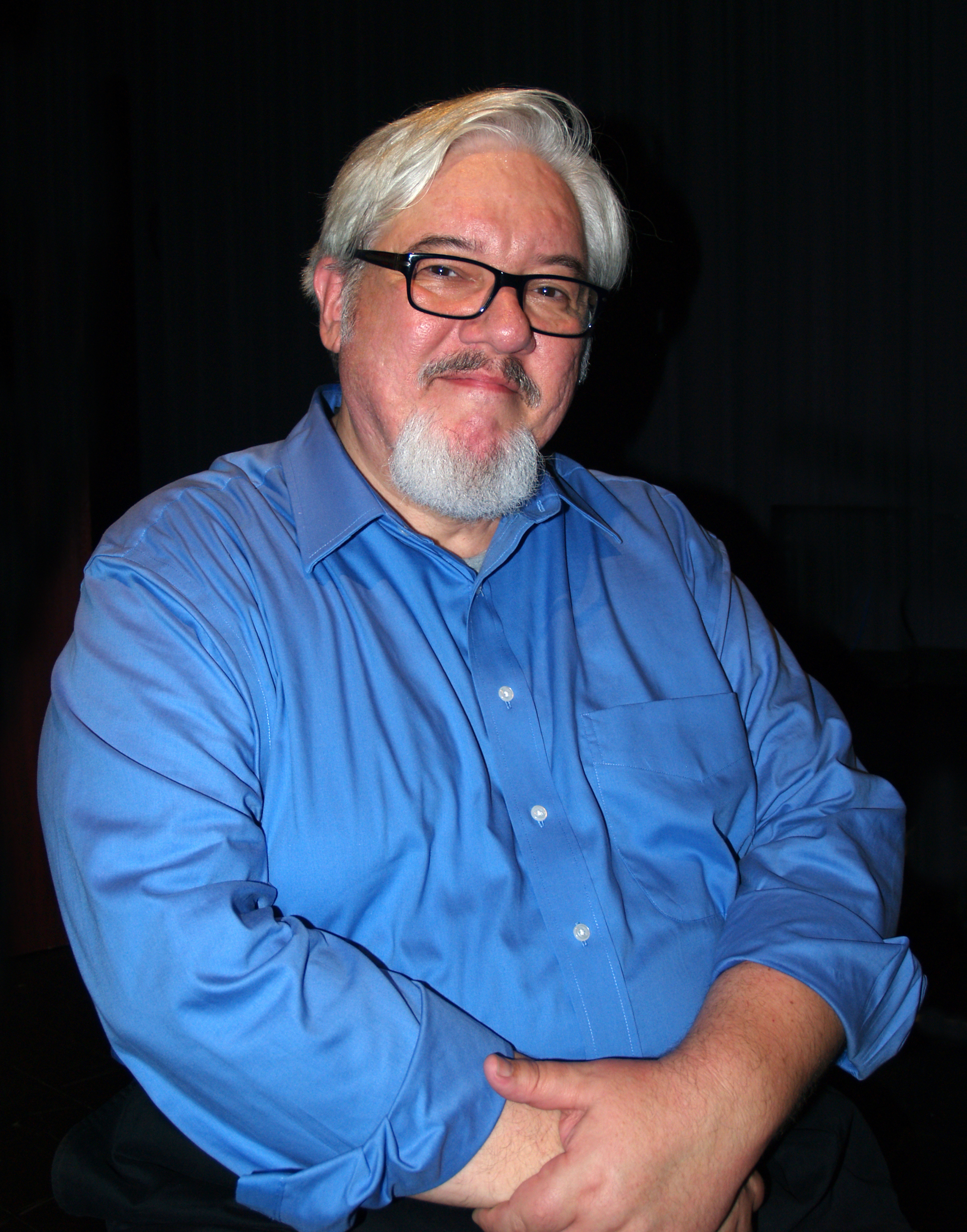
- Sito at a September 16, 2013 lecture on the history of computer animation at the SVA Theatre in Manhattan
- Born: May 19, 1956 (age 70); Brooklyn, New York
- Occupations: Animator, writer, historian, educator
- Board member of: Academy of Motion Picture Arts and Sciences, ASIFA-Hollywood
- Spouse: Pat Sito (m. 1980)
- Awards: June Foray Award, 2010; Dusty Award for Lifetime Achievement, 2016

Tom Sito (born May 19, 1956) is an American animator, animation historian and teacher. He is currently a professor at USC's School of Cinematic Arts in the Animation Division. In 1998, Sito was included by Animation Magazine in their list of the One Hundred Most Important People in Animation.

== Early life ==
Tom Sito was born and raised in Brooklyn, New York, the son of a fireman. Sito first began studying animation while attending cartooning classes at the High School of Art and Design. He continued his animation studies at The School of Visual Arts (SVA) with Howard Beckerman, cartooning under Harvey Kurtzman, Gil Miret, Howard Beckerman and Robert Beverly Hale. Sito graduated from SVA in 1977 with a Bachelor of Fine Arts in Media Arts. He met his wife, Pat, at SVA and the two were married on January 4, 1980. Additionally, Sito studied life drawing at The Art Students League of New York under Robert Beverly Hale.

== Career ==
Sito's cartooning career began with him working on cartoons for Dixie Cups, as well as gag writing for Playboy magazine's comic series, Little Annie Fanny, under his instructor, Harvey Kurtzman. Sito assisted retired Disney animator Shamus Culhane on one of his final projects, a 1977 education short entitled Protection in the Nuclear Age. Sito's first big break came in 1976 when he was hired by legendary animation director Richard Williams to work on his film Raggedy Ann & Andy: A Musical Adventure. There he met and worked with animation luminaries like Eric Goldberg, Art Babbitt and John Canemaker. After several years doing commercial animation work in New York and Toronto, Sito relocated to Los Angeles and worked on TV projects like Super Friends for Hanna-Barbera (1978), He-Man and the Masters of the Universe and Fat Albert and the Cosby Kids (1983–1985).

Tom Sito was summoned by his old mentor Richard Williams once more in 1987 (the same year he made the independently animated short Propagadance) to animate on Disney/Amblin's Academy Award-winning hit film Who Framed Roger Rabbit. Returning to Los Angeles in 1988, Sito became a mainstay of the Disney Feature Animation division, contributing to the classic films The Little Mermaid, Beauty and the Beast, Aladdin, The Lion King, Pocahontas, Fantasia 2000, and Dinosaur.

Sito left the Disney studio in 1995 to help set up the animation unit of DreamWorks SKG, later DreamWorks Animation. He worked on the films Antz, The Prince of Egypt, Paulie and Spirit: Stallion of the Cimarron. He was the storyboard director of the first Shrek film and he was president of the Motion Picture Screen Cartoonist's Local 839 (later renamed The Animation Guild, I.A.T.S.E. Local 839) from 1992 to 2001, where he was awarded the title President Emeritus. He co-directed the animation for the Warner Bros. 2001 movie Osmosis Jones and contributed to other animated films such as Looney Tunes: Back in Action (2003), Garfield (2004) and Son of the Mask (2005), the PBS TV series Click and Clack's As the Wrench Turns (2008) and the 2006 Taiwanese short Adventures in the NPM, which won first prize at the 2006 Tokyo Anime Festival.

Tom Sito has lectured about animation around the world and has taught animation and animation history at UCLA Film School, The American Film Institute, Woodbury College and Santa Monica College. He became an instructor at the USC School of Cinematic Arts in 1994 and in December 2014 was named Chair of the John C. Hench Division of Animation and Digital Arts at USC.

Tom Sito was interviewed for the PBS American Experience documentary "Walt Disney" (2014) for WGBH Boston. In 2015 he appeared in the documentary Floyd Norman: An Animated Life. In 2020 he was interviewed for the Reelz Channel documentary series Autopsy: The Last Hours of Walt Disney.

He wrote the story for the short "Flash in the Pain", which appeared in the 2016 animated film Storks.

In July 2017, Tom Sito was elected by his peers to the Board of Governors of The Motion Picture Academy of Arts and Sciences to represent the Short Films and Feature Animation Branch 2017-2020. Sito was vice-president of ASIFA-Hollywood from 1992-2017.

== Books ==
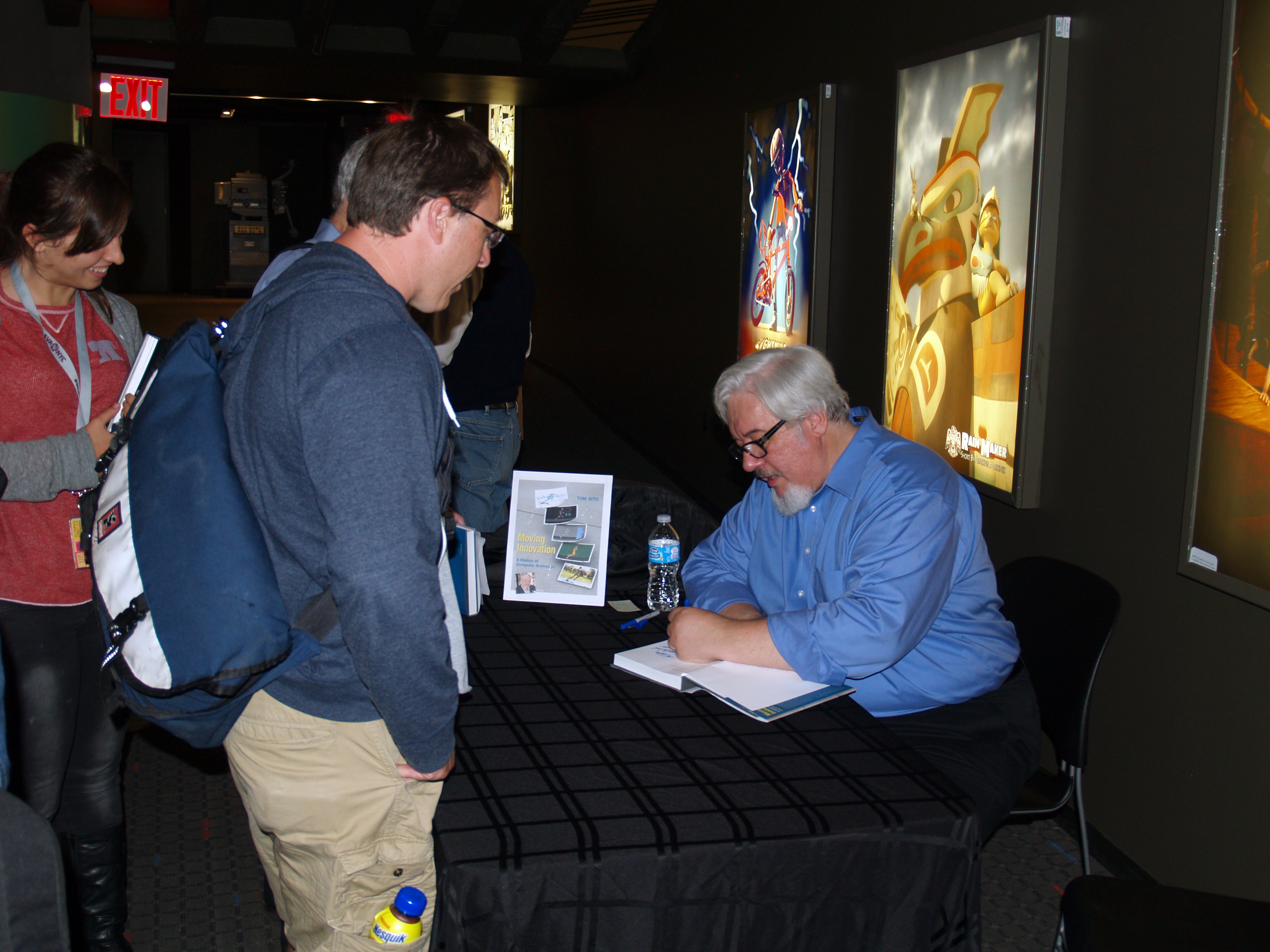
Sito signing copies of his book, Moving Innovation: A History of Computer Animation

In 2006, Tom Sito wrote Drawing the Line: The Untold Story of the Animation Unions from Bosko to Bart Simpson, which has been hailed as a seminal work on the history of the labor movement in American animation. The London Review of Books said "Sito's book contains the best account yet of the 1941 Walt Disney Strike, with documentation from the union side". Sito also contributed the animation chapter to Dr. Paul Buhle's anthology, Jews in American Popular Culture, and updated the classic animation how-to book, Timing for Animation, for Focal/Elsevier Press in 2009.

In 2013, Tom Sito published Moving Innovation, A History of Computer Animation through MIT Press. It was named a CHOICE Outstanding Academic Title in 2013 and selected as a Best of 2013 by Computing Reviews. It was also a nominated finalist for the 2013 Kraszna-Krausz book award in London.

In 2019, Tom Sito published "Eat, Drink, Animate: An Animator's Cookbook" through CRC Press. It is the first ever collection of the food recipes of famous animators like Chuck Jones, Frank Thomas and Mary Blair. In 2019 Eat, Drink, Animate was given a Best In World by International Gourmand world cookbook awards.

== Awards ==
In 2010, Tom Sito was awarded the June Foray Award at ASIFA-Hollywood's Annie Awards for "significant and benevolent or charitable impact on the art and industry of animation". In 2016 he was awarded the Dusty Award for Alumni Lifetime Achievement from The School of Visual Arts. In 2024, Sito would be a recipient of the Inkpot Award at the annual San Diego Comic Con.

== Bibliography ==
- Walt's People Vol 18 Talking Disney with the Artists Who Knew Him. Foreword. Edited by Didier Ghez, Theme Park Press, 2016
- Walt's People Vol 9 Talking Disney with the Artists who Knew Him. Edited by Didier Ghez, Theme Park Press 2010
- The London Review of Books
- The Art of Harvey Kurtzman: The Mad Genius of Comics by Denis Kitchen and Paul Buhle. Abrams/Comic Arts 2009
- Making'Toons, Inside the Most Popular Animation TV Shows and Movies, by Allan Neuwirth, Allworth Press New York 2004
- Disney's Art of Animation From Mickey Mouse to Beauty and the Beast, by Bob Thomas, Hyperion Press, 1991
- Talking Animals and Other Funny People by Shamus Culhane, St Martin's Press, NYC, 1986
- Drawing the Line: The Untold Story of the Animation Unions from Bosko to Bart Simpson, by Tom Sito University of Kentucky Press, Lexington 2006
- Moving Innovation
- Eat, Drink, Animate
