= John Howard Lawson =

American playwright and screenwriter (1894–1977)

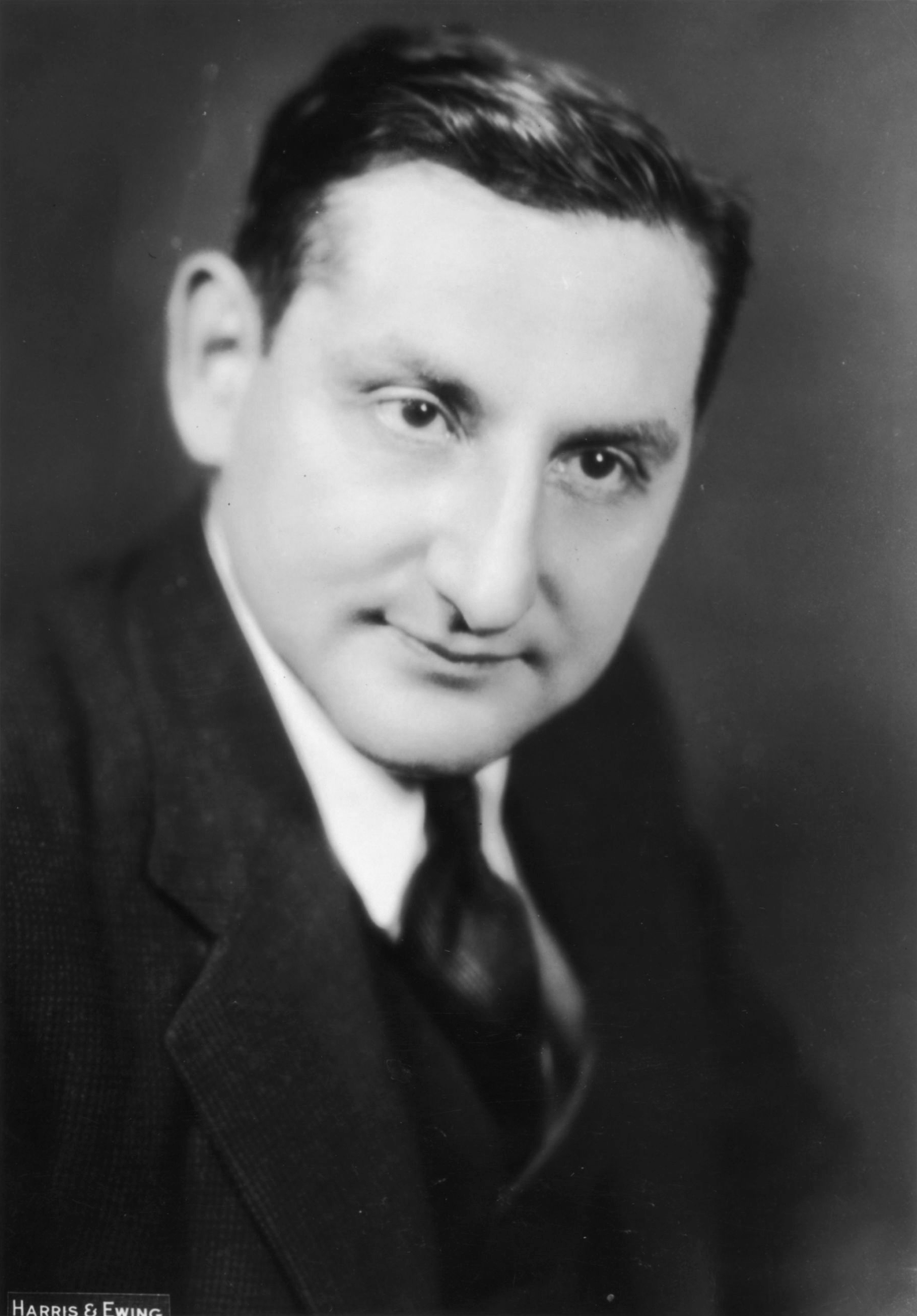
- Portrait by Harris & Ewing
- Born: September 25, 1894; New York, New York, U.S.
- Died: August 11, 1977 (aged 82); San Francisco, California, U.S.
- Education: Williams College (BA)
- Occupations: Playwright, screenwriter
- Spouses: Kathryn Drain (m. 1918; div. 1923) Susan Edmond (m. 1925)
- Children: 3
- Writing career
- Pen name: Edward Lewis
- Period: Modernism

Signature
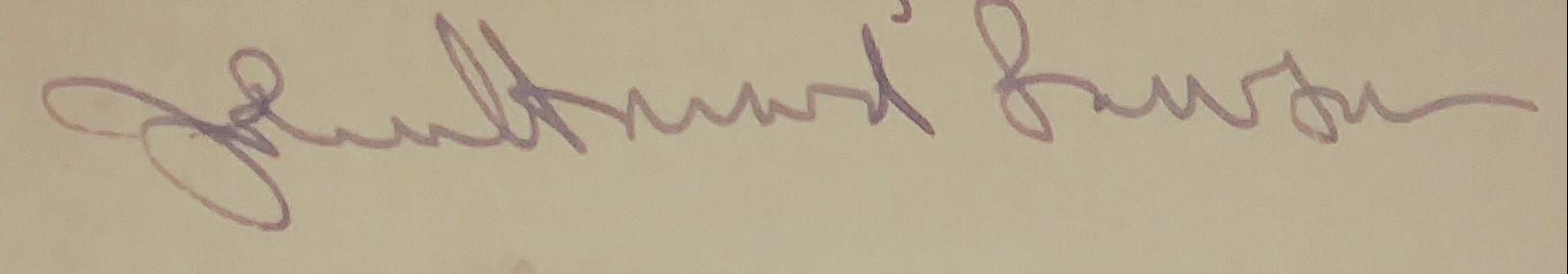

John Howard Lawson (September 25, 1894 – August 11, 1977) was an American playwright, screenwriter, arts critic, and cultural historian. After enjoying a relatively successful career writing plays that were staged on and off Broadway in the 1920s and '30s, Lawson relocated to Hollywood and began working in the motion picture industry. In 1933, he helped to organize the Screen Writers Guild and became its first president. In the ensuing years, he was credited with a number of notable screenplays including Blockade (1938), Action in the North Atlantic (1943), and Counter-Attack (1945).

In 1947, Lawson was one of the Hollywood Ten, the initial group of American film industry professionals to appear before Congress as part of an investigation into communist influence in Hollywood. Because he and the other nine screenwriters and directors refused to answer questions about their alleged Communist Party affiliation, they were cited for contempt of Congress. In 1948, Lawson was sentenced to a year in prison; he began serving in 1950. When he got out, he like the others found himself blacklisted by the studios. He wrote, uncredited, the screenplay for Cry, the Beloved Country (1951), an adaptation of Alan Paton's anti-apartheid novel about South Africa. With his Hollywood livelihood largely cut off, Lawson turned his attention to scholarship. He taught at several California universities. He authored books about drama, Filmmaking, and cultural history. Unlike other members of the Hollywood Ten, Lawson was never "un-blacklisted". He remained a pariah in the film industry until his death in 1977.

== Life and career ==
=== Childhood and education ===
John Howard Lawson was born on September 25, 1894, in New York City to affluent Jewish parents, Simeon Levy and Belle Hart. In the 1880s, Simeon had lived in Mexico City, where he started the Mexican Financier newspaper. After he met Belle, he moved to New York City and became an executive with Reuters. Before his first child was born, Simeon changed the family name from Levy to Lawson, later saying half-jokingly that he did it so he could "obtain reservations at expensive resort hotels", many of which refused to accommodate Jews.

When John was five, his mother died of breast cancer, which was a profound loss that scarred him. Belle had named her three children after people she admired: Wendell Holmes Lawson was named for the American jurist Oliver Wendell Holmes; Lawson's sister Adelaide Jaffery Lawson was named for a friend of Belle's who was active in social causes; John Howard Lawson was named for prison reformer John Howard.

As a successful businessman, Simeon was able to send his children to private schools. At age seven, John attended the experimental school, The Playhouse, run by Elizabeth and Alexis Ferm. Later, he and his siblings went to Halstead School in Yonkers, New York and then to Cutler School in New Rochelle, New York. In 1906, Simeon sent his three children on a tour of Europe where they saw many theatrical productions. John took notes on the set designs, actors, and plays. In 1909, the children toured the United States and Canada.

Lawson entered Williams College in 1910. He contributed to The Williams College Monthly literary magazine. He edited the senior yearbook and was a member of the varsity debating team. But he also encountered antisemitism. During his sophomore year, he was denied election to The Williams College Monthly's editorial board because some students raised questions about his Jewish background. He would later say it was a good experience since it forced him "to begin his struggle to come to terms with his Jewish identity." As previously stated, his father had changed the family surname from Levy to Lawson; Simeon also insisted the family belong to a Christian church. They joined the First Church at 96th Street and Central Park West. As a boy, John recalled going to the house of a Christian schoolmate. He happened to mention his father's real name was Levy; he was not invited to that house again. But despite Simeon's wish for the Lawson family to assimilate, John would adhere to Jewish dietary laws all his life.

Lawson's reputation at Williams was as a good-natured iconoclast and a frequent speaker at undergraduate meetings. His older brother Wendell was meanwhile studying music and art in Germany. On a trip back to the U.S. in 1913, Wendell brought a copy of Karl Kautsky's The Class Struggle. According to one biographer, "This book gave [John Howard] Lawson his first knowledge of Marx and Marxism, with which he first disagreed, though he brought Kautsky's book to Socialist Club meetings and, to the faculty sponsor's annoyance, quoted from it as a basis for discussion." After graduating from Williams in 1914 with a B.A., he worked as a cable editor for Reuters from 1914 to 1915.

=== Early plays ===
Lawson wrote his first play, A Hindoo Love Drama, while at Williams. Mary Kirkpatrick, faculty leader of the Williams College Drama Club, was impressed by this effort and became his first agent. Lawson was inspired to write three plays in 1915-16: Standards, The Spice of Life, and Servant-Master-Lover. Standards was bought by George M. Cohan and Sam Harris, and was given a tryout in Albany and Syracuse in 1915. It never made it to Broadway. Oliver Morosco produced Servant-Master-Lover in a run in Los Angeles, but received bad reviews.

=== World War I ===
When the United States entered World War I in 1917, Lawson was opposed to enlisting. His father helped him obtain a position in the Norton-Harjes Volunteer Ambulance Corps. In June 1917, he left for Europe. Aboard the ship, he met John Dos Passos, also an aspiring writer. In November, when Norton-Haryes was folded into the American Red Cross's Ambulance Service, Dos Passos and Lawson decided to become drivers. They first served in Italy. At this time, Dos Passos was working on One Man's Initiation: 1917 and Lawson had begun his play Roger Bloomer. They were then outfitted to Paris. While there, Lawson attended performances of the Comédie-Française and Sergey Diaghilev's Ballets Russes. In January 1918, Dos Passos wrote a letter that was critical of the ambulance company. It somehow reached Red Cross officials, and they forced Dos Passos to resign. Lawson was under suspicion for his attitudes as well, but he managed to stay in Italy and do public relations work for the Red Cross.

=== Post-war ===
While living in Rome in autumn of 1918, Lawson met and married Kathryn (Kate) Drain. She was a volunteer nurse's aide, and would later become a film actress and costume designer. In spring of 1919, they returned home to New York due to a lack of money and the wishes of their families. Their son Alan was born in July 1919. In early 1920, the Lawsons moved back to Europe and found residence in Paris, where he completed Roger Bloomer. It would be his first play to reach Broadway when it opened on March 1, 1923. It was put on by the Equity Players and ran for fifty performances. His marriage to Kate did not last; they were divorced in 1923. He had meanwhile met Susan Edmond, whom he would marry two years later, and they remained married till the end of his life.

Lawson's next play, Processional, was produced by the Theatre Guild and opened on Broadway on January 12, 1925. Although the production ran for 96 performances, it failed financially, and the Theatre Guild told Lawson they would not stage any more of his plays written in the expressionistic style. In 1937, the Federal Theatre Project revived Processional and it garnered critical and popular acclaim.

In 1926, the New York International Theatrical Exposition showcased experimental European cubist, futurist, and constructivist plays. Lawson was fascinated by these avant-garde works, which he saw as revolutionary. Along with Dos Passos and Michael Gold, Lawson formed the Workers Drama League to produce revolutionary plays. One production and a few weeks later, however, the three men disbanded the league. They then joined with Em Jo Basshe to establish a radical theatrical group that came to be known as the "New Playwrights Theater". The group survived until 1929 and was largely funded by millionaire businessman Otto Hermann Kahn who was a devoted patron of the arts.

Lawson's play Nirvana premiered on March 3, 1926, at the Greenwich Village Theatre, but ran for only six performances. It calls for "a new religion that can help people survive the swirling cyclone of jazz, new machinery, great buildings, science fiction, tabloids, and radio." But Nirvana never managed to tie together all of those disparate elements into a coherent drama. The fact that the play lasted even six performances was due to "the excellent stage design by Mordecai Gorelik and the reputation Lawson had established with Processional."

In late 1926, Lawson served with Dos Passos and Gold on a committee that attempted to establish the Proletarian Artists and Writers League. A similar Soviet Union organization offered some financial backing to them. The first play produced by the New Playwrights Theater, Lawson's Loudspeaker, opened on March 7, 1927, at the 52nd Street Theatre and ran for forty-two performances. He had been intrigued by the ceremonial laying of the cornerstone at the Theatre Guild playhouse in 1924, an event attended by both New York Governor Al Smith and Otto Kahn. In his play, Lawson explored the concept of Kahn as governor rather than Smith.

In August 1927, Lawson, Dos Passos, and Gold went to Boston to protest the executions of the Italian immigrant anarchists Nicola Sacco and Bartolomeo Vanzetti. Lawson would later write in his autobiography that during this time period in his life, he could "neither ignore the flaws in American politics and economics nor bring himself to become more deeply involved in the struggle." In his conflicted state of mind, he left New York for Hollywood, where the motion picture industry was clamoring for dramatists to write for the new talking pictures.

=== Hollywood and New York ===
While Lawson was working in Hollywood in 1928, the New Playwrights Theater in New York decided to produce his expressionistic play, The International, with a set designed by John Dos Passos. It opened on January 12 and ran for twenty-seven performances.

In Hollywood, Lawson was under contract with Metro-Goldwyn-Mayer (MGM) and wrote scripts for films such as The Ship from Shanghai, Bachelor Apartment, and Good-bye Love. In the winter of 1930–1931, he wrote a new play, Success Story. The Theatre Guild rejected it, but Harold Clurman, who was a reader for the Guild, saw possibilities. He had recently formed the Group Theatre and needed new dramatic material. Clurman and Lawson reworked the play during the summer of 1932. Success Story opened on September 26, 1932, and ran for 121 performances. Lawson later adapted it into the 1934 film, Success at Any Price.

In 1933, Lawson, Lester Cole, and Samuel Ornitz helped organize the Screen Writers Guild (SWG). Lawson served as SWG's first president from 1933 to 1934. He later recalled how he spent most of his tenure in Washington, D.C. trying to get recognition of the union under provisions of the newly passed National Industrial Recovery Act. Lawson finally succeeded in that task, and the SWG became a viable union that could bargain on behalf of screenwriters. However, the success came at a cost. He was soon fired by MGM, an action he attributed to his union organizing.

Lawson continued to be a prolific playwright. In 1932, in addition to reworking Success Story, he wrote The Pure in Heart. The Theatre Guild agreed to produce it, but backed out "when the out-of-town tryout in Baltimore failed to impress audiences or critics." After the Group Theatre also rejected the play, it was produced by Richard Aldrich and Alfred De Liagre. The Pure in Heart opened on March 20, 1933, and had a run of only seven performances. Lawson's play Gentlewoman, completed in association with D. A. Doran Jr., was produced by the Group Theatre and opened on March 22, 1934. It ran for twelve performances.

During the 1930s, several prominent leftists accused Lawson of lacking ideological and political commitment. In April 1934, his longtime friend Mike Gold sharply criticized him in New Masses magazine, describing Lawson as "A Bourgeois Hamlet of Our Time" who wrote "adolescent works that lacked moral fiber or clear ideas." A week later, Lawson responded in the magazine with an essay entitled "'Inner Conflict' in Proletarian Art". He said his middle-class upbringing had prevented him from fully understanding working-class people. He acknowledged that his prosperity and Hollywood connections were suspect in the fight for workers' rights.

Partly due to the criticism he received from the Left, Lawson decided in 1934 to join the Communist Party (CPUSA). He sought to educate himself about the proletarian cause. He traveled throughout poverty-stricken areas of Alabama and Georgia where workers were trying to unionize, and facing violent resistance. While in the South, he submitted articles to the Daily Worker. He himself was arrested numerous times. These experiences inspired his next play, Marching Song. Produced by the radical Theatre Union, Marching Song opened in New York on February 17, 1937, and ran for sixty-one performances.

As a result of his newfound communist commitment, Lawson wrote several politically themed screenplays in the next decade, such as Blockade (1938) about the Spanish Civil War. This work earned him an Academy Award nomination for Best Story. He wrote the critically acclaimed Algiers (1938), and two Humphrey Bogart war movies in 1943, Sahara and Action in the North Atlantic. Lawson also wrote Counter-Attack (1945), a tribute to the Soviet-U.S. alliance during the struggle against European fascism.

One biographer notes that Lawson "became an important member of the small CPUSA community in Hollywood, then eventually its cultural czar." In 1941, Lawson ordered Budd Schulberg to make changes to his novel What Makes Sammy Run? to better fit the Communist message; Schulberg refused and quit the CPUSA in protest. In February 1943, Francis Biddle added the League of American Writers to the Attorney General's List of Subversive Organizations. In response, the Hollywood branch, spearheaded by Lawson, renamed itself the Hollywood Writers Mobilization. In 1946, Lawson organized and led a critical attack on Albert Maltz after the latter penned a New Masses article, "What Shall We Ask of Writers?". In the article, Maltz challenged the didacticism of the CPUSA's censorship of writers. Surprised by the ferocity of attack from his colleagues—including Lawson, Howard Fast, Alvah Bessie, Ring Lardner Jr., and Samuel Sillen—Maltz publicly recanted.

=== House Un-American Activities Committee (HUAC) ===
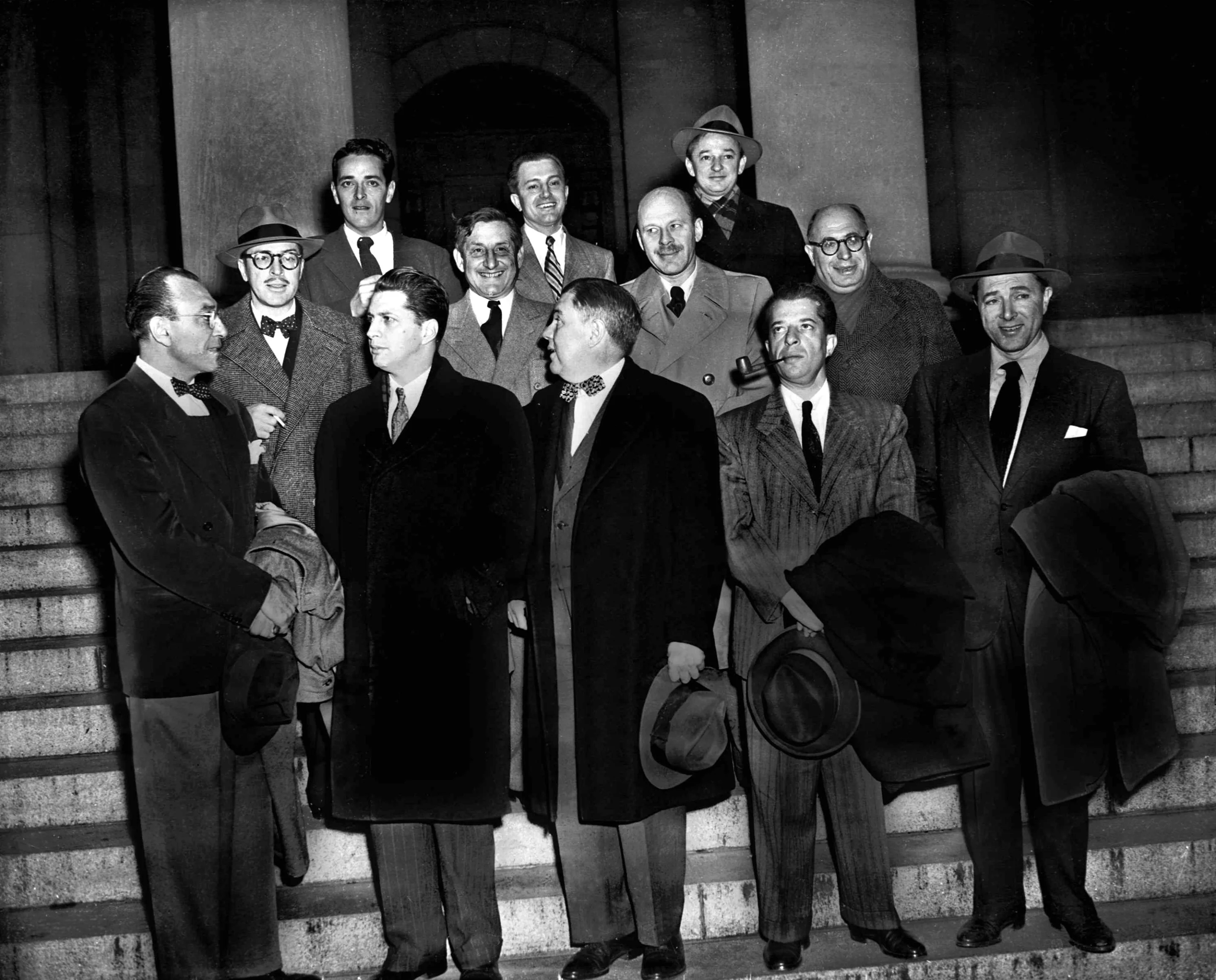
"The Hollywood Ten" stand with their attorneys outside district court in Washington, D.C. before arraignment on contempt of Congress charges. The ten were charged for refusing to cooperate with the House Un-American Activities Committee. (Front row, L-R): Herbert Biberman, attorney Martin Popper, attorney Robert W. Kenny, Albert Maltz and Lester Cole. (Second row, L-R): Dalton Trumbo, John Howard Lawson, Alvah Bessie and Samuel Ornitz. (Top row, L-R): Ring Lardner Jr., Edward Dmytryk and Adrian Scott.

Following World War II, American fears of communist power were heightened after the Soviet Union established communist governments in Eastern Europe. The House Committee on Un-American Activities (HUAC), chaired by Congressman J. Parnell Thomas (R-NJ), began an investigation into communist influence in the Hollywood motion picture industry.

Rep. J. Parnell Thomas shown in 1939

Lawson testified before the HUAC on October 29, 1947. Like Alvah Bessie, Herbert Biberman, Albert Maltz, Adrian Scott, Dalton Trumbo, Lester Cole, Edward Dmytryk, Samuel Ornitz and Ring Lardner Jr., he refused to answer almost all questions and would not give names of other people he knew in communist circles. These ten screenwriters and directors came to be known as the Hollywood Ten or "Unfriendly Ten".

Lawson's appearance before the committee was marked by shouting, interruptions, and sharp exchanges with Chairman Thomas. From the outset, tensions flared between the two men because, unlike prior HUAC witnesses, Lawson was not permitted to read his opening statement into the Congressional Record:

Mr. LAWSON. Mr. Chairman, I have a statement here which I wish to make—
The CHAIRMAN. Well, all right, let me see your statement.
(Statement handed to the chairman.)
The CHAIRMAN. I don't care to read any more of the statement. The statement will not be read. I read the first line.
Mr. LAWSON. You have spent one week vilifying me before the American public—
The CHAIRMAN. Just a minute—
Mr. LAWSON. And you refuse to allow me to make a statement on my rights as an American citizen.
The CHAIRMAN. I refuse you to make the statement, because of the first sentence in your statement. That statement is not pertinent to the inquiry.

The first sentence which Thomas objected to was: "For a week, this committee has conducted an illegal and indecent trial of American citizens, whom the Committee has selected to be publicly pilloried and smeared." The conclusion of Lawson's testimony was even more acrimonious as he was confronted by Robert Stripling and Chairman Thomas:

Mr. STRIPLING. Have you ever held any office in the [Screen Writers] guild?
Mr. LAWSON. The question of whether I have held office is also a question which is beyond the purview of this committee.
(The chairman pounding gavel.)
Mr. LAWSON. It is an invasion of the right of association under the Bill of Rights of this country.
The CHAIRMAN. Please be responsive to the question.
Mr. LAWSON. It is also a matter—
(The chairman pounding gavel.)
Mr. LAWSON. Of public record—
The CHAIRMAN. You asked to be heard. Through your attorney, you asked to be heard, and we want you to be heard. And if you don't care to be heard, then we will excuse you and we will put the record in without your answers.
Mr. LAWSON. I wish to frame my own answers to your questions, Mr. Chairman, and I intend to do so. . . . It is absolutely beyond the power of this committee to inquire into my association in any organization.
The CHAIRMAN. Mr. Lawson, you will have to stop or you will leave the witness stand. And you will leave the witness stand because you are in contempt. That is why you will leave the witness stand. And if you are just trying to force me to put you in contempt, you won't have to try much harder. You know what has happened to a lot of people that have been in contempt of this committee this year, don't you?
Mr. LAWSON. I am glad you have made it perfectly clear that you are going to threaten and intimidate the witnesses, Mr. Chairman.
(The chairman pounding gavel.)
Mr. LAWSON. I am an American and I am not at all easy to intimidate, and don't think I am.
. . .
The CHAIRMAN (pounding gavel). Mr. Lawson, just quiet down again. Mr. Lawson, the most pertinent question that we can ask is whether or not you have ever been a member of the Communist Party. Now, do you care to answer that question?
Mr. LAWSON. You are using the old technique, which was used in Hitler Germany in order to create a scare here—
The CHAIRMAN (pounding gavel). Oh—
Mr. LAWSON. In order to create an entirely false atmosphere in which this hearing is conducted—
. . .
The CHAIRMAN (pounding gavel). We are going to get the answer to that question if we have to stay here for a week. Are you a member of the Communist Party, or have you ever been a member of the Communist Party?
Mr. LAWSON. It is unfortunate and tragic that I have to teach this committee the basic principles of American—
The CHAIRMAN (pounding gavel). That is not the question. That is not the question. The question is: Have you ever been a member of the Communist Party?
Mr. LAWSON. I am framing my answer in the only way in which any American citizen can frame his answer to a question which absolutely invades his rights.
The CHAIRMAN. Then you refuse to answer that question; is that correct?
Mr. LAWSON. I have told you that I will offer my beliefs, affiliations, and everything else to the American public, and they will know where I stand.
The CHAIRMAN (pounding gavel). Excuse the witness—
Mr. LAWSON. As they do from what I have written.
The CHAIRMAN (pounding gavel). Stand away from the stand—
Mr. LAWSON. I have written Americanism for many years, and I shall continue to fight for the Bill of Rights, which you are trying to destroy.
The CHAIRMAN. Officers, take this man away from the stand—
[Applause and boos.]
The CHAIRMAN (pounding gavel). There will be no demonstrations. No demonstrations, for or against. Everyone will please be seated. . .

The Hollywood Ten claimed that the First Amendment of the U.S. Constitution gave them the right to not cooperate with the committee. However, the U.S. appeals courts disagreed and all ten were found guilty of contempt of Congress. Lawson was sentenced to twelve months in Ashland Prison and fined $1,000. The Hollywood Ten were immediately blacklisted from working for any of the studios.

For the most part, the ten men stayed united in their resistance to HUAC, but there was a notable exception. In late 1950, Edward Dmytryk cut short his prison term so that he could appear before the committee again as a friendly witness. He testified that Lawson, Albert Maltz, and Adrian Scott "had put him under pressure to make sure his films expressed the views of the American Communist Party. This was particularly damaging as several members of the original Hollywood Ten were at that time involved in court cases with their previous employers." Dmytryk went on to name twenty-six current or former left-wing film artists and was thereby able to resume his directorial career.

In his book Naming Names, Victor Navasky writes that Lawson regarded the Hollywood blacklist "as only one part of the McCarthyite program, which he saw as aiming to control America's mass communications through a new and total censorship. He believed that the cultural blacklist involved a basic struggle concerning control of mass media—a struggle that began with the first sound picture and is still going on."

=== Later years ===
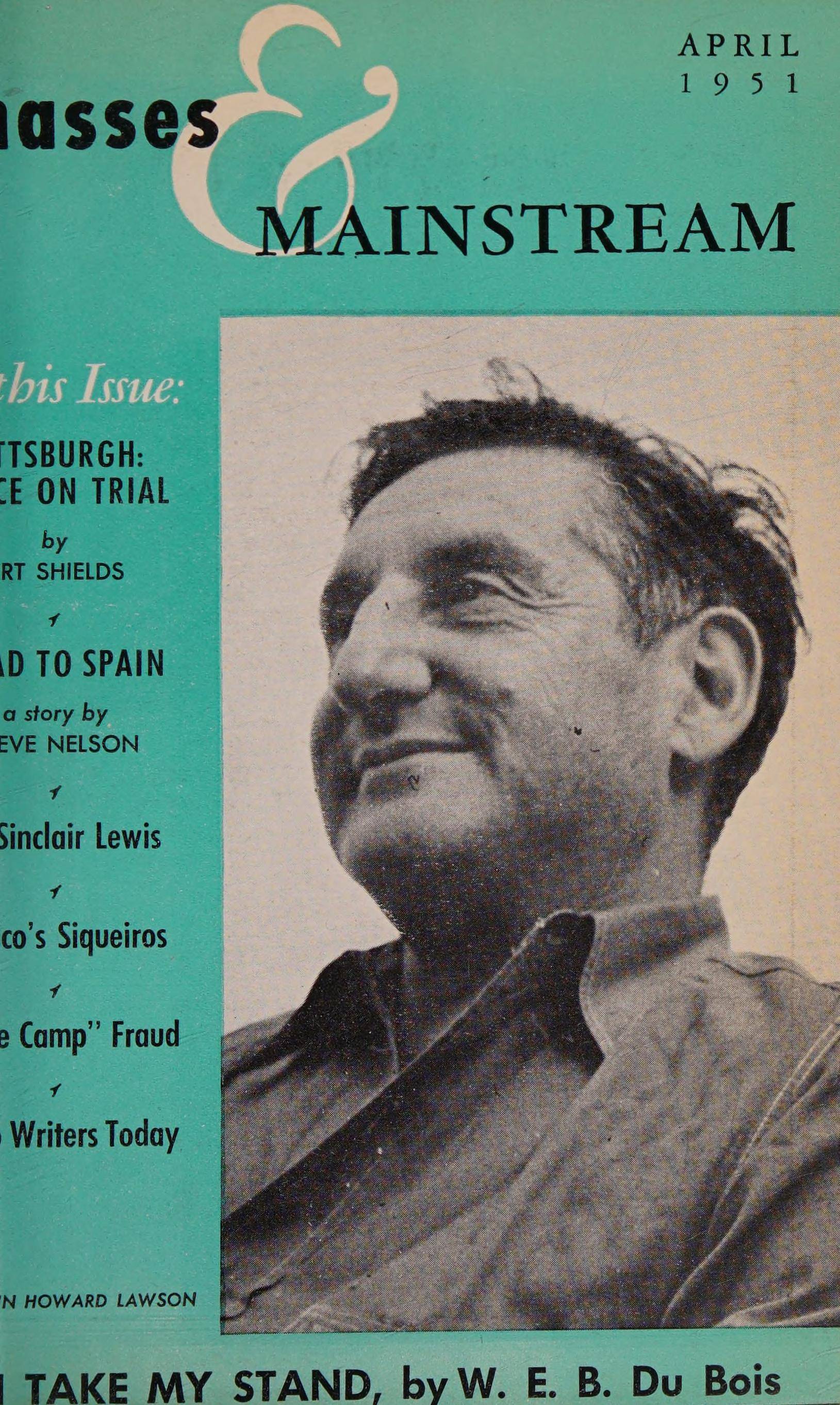
Lawson on the cover of Masses & Mainstream, April 1951

While banned from working in Hollywood, Lawson continued to explore, from a Marxist perspective, the theoretical foundations of drama and cinema. He expanded his 1936 Theory and Technique of Playwriting into Theory and Technique of Playwriting and Screenwriting (1949), and revised it again for a 1960 edition. The book has been described as "one of the better articulations of the fundaments of dramatic construction." He researched and wrote a lengthy historical work on cultural tradition entitled The Hidden Heritage: A Rediscovery of the Ideas and Forces that Link the Thought of Our Time with the Culture of the Past (1950). He analyzed the politics of mid-20th century Hollywood offerings in Film in the Battle of Ideas (1953). He expounded on "the principles, technique, and aesthetics of film-making" in Film: The Creative Process (1964). He also co-authored, using a pseudonym, the screenplay for one of the first anti-apartheid movies, Cry, the Beloved Country (1951). Despite the film industry's blacklist, Lawson was able to earn money by teaching at several California universities, including Stanford, Loyola Marymount University, and the University of Judaism in Los Angeles.

In Film in the Battle of Ideas, Lawson wrote that "the rulers of the United States take the film very seriously as an instrument of propaganda, and will do their utmost to prevent its use for any democratic purpose." He alleged that Hollywood "has always falsified the life of American workers" and its "unwritten law decrees that only the middle and upper classes provide themes suitable for film presentation, and that workers appear on the screen only in subordinate or comic roles." According to Lawson, "The consistent presentation on the nation's screens of the views that working-class life is to be despised and that workers who seek to protect their class interests are stupid, malicious, or even treasonable, has its effect on every strike and every labor struggle." He added, "Workers and their families see films which urge them to despise the values by which they live, and to emulate the corrupt values of their enemies." He also condemned the screen portrayals of Negroes at that time in the early 1950s. And he argued that Hollywood promoted degrading images of women, treating "'glamour' and sex appeal as the sum-total of woman's personality". He wrote that in most American movies, "when a woman succeeds in the world of competition, Hollywood holds that her success is achieved by trickery, deceit, and the amoral use of sexual appeal."

Lawson died in San Francisco on August 11, 1977. He was 82. Unlike other members of the Hollywood Ten, such as Dalton Trumbo and Ring Lardner Jr., who were eventually "forgiven" for their youthful political radicalism and allowed to work openly again in the film industry, Lawson was never forgiven. He was persona non grata all the way up until his death. That's why Gerald Horne called him "The Final Victim of the Blacklist". The New York Times obituary for Lawson quoted him as saying:

I'm much more completely blacklisted than the others. I'm much more notorious and I'm very proud of that. It had much to do with the fact that I helped to organize the [Screen Writers] Guild and played a leading role in progressive activities until 1947.

The manuscript of his unpublished autobiography is held, along with his other papers, at Southern Illinois University Carbondale in Carbondale, Illinois.

== Works ==
=== Plays ===
- A Hindoo Love Drama (1915)
- The Spice of Life (1915)
- Servant-Master-Lover (1916)
- Standards (1916)
- Roger Bloomer (1923)
- Processional (1925)
- Nirvana (1926)
- Loudspeaker (1927)
- The International (1928)
- Success Story (1932)
- The Pure in Heart (1934)
- Gentlewoman (1934)
- Marching Song (1937)
- Parlor Magic (1938)
- Parlor Magic (1961)

=== Film scripts ===
- Dream of Love (1928), with Dorothy Farnum, Marion Ainslee, and Ruth Cummings
- The Pagan (1929), with Dorothy Farnum
- Dynamite (1929), with Jeanie MacPherson
- The Sea Bat (1930), with Dorothy Yost and Bess Meredyth
- Our Blushing Brides (1930), with Bess Meredyth and Helen Mainard
- The Ship from Shanghai (1930)
- Bachelor Apartment (1931), with J. Walter Rubin
- Good-bye Love (1933), with Hampton Del Ruth and George Rosener
- Success at Any Price (1934), with Howard J. Green
- Treasure Island (1934), with John Lee Mahin and Leonard Praskins
- Party Wire (1935), with Ethel Hill
- Adventure in Manhattan (1936), adaptation uncredited
- Blockade (1938)
- Algiers (1938), with James M. Cain
- They Shall Have Music (1939), with Irma von Cube
- Earthbound (1940), with Samuel C. Engel
- Four Sons (1940), with Milton Sperling
- Action in the North Atlantic (1943), with Guy Gilpatric and A.I. Bezzerides
- Sahara (1943), with James O'Hanlon
- Counter-Attack (1945), with Janet Stevenson and Philip Stevenson
- Smash-Up, the Story of a Woman (1947) with Dorothy Parker and Lionel Wiggam
- Cry, the Beloved Country (1951), with Alan Paton
- The Careless Years (1957), with Mitch Lindemann

=== Books ===
- Theory and Technique of Playwrighting (PDF). Hill and Wang. 1960 [1936].
- The Hidden Heritage: A Rediscovery of the Ideas and Forces That Link the Thought of Our Time with the Culture of the Past, Citadel, 1950, 1st revised edition, 1968.
- Film in the Battle of Ideas (PDF). Masses & Mainstream. 1953.
- Film, The Creative Process: The Search for an Audio-Visual Language and Structure (PDF) (2 ed.). Hill and Wang. 1967 [1964].

=== Introductions ===
- Ten Days that Shook the World by John Reed, New York, International Publishers, 1967.
- People's Theatre in Amerika by Karen M. Taylor, New York: Drama Books, 1972.

== See also ==
- List of ambulance drivers during World War I
