= Counter-Attack =

1945 film by Zoltan Korda

- Film poster
- Directed by: Zoltan Korda
- Screenplay by: John Howard Lawson
- Based on: Counterattack by; Janet Stevenson; Philip Stevenson; Pobyeda by; Ilya Vershinin; Mikhail Ruderman
- Starring: Paul Muni
- Cinematography: James Wong Howe
- Edited by: Al Clark; Charles Nelson
- Music by: Louis Gruenberg
- Production company: Columbia Pictures
- Distributed by: Columbia Pictures
- Release date: April 26, 1945
- Running time: 90 minutes
- Country: United States
- Language: English

Counter-Attack is a 1945 American war film directed by Zoltan Korda and starring Paul Muni and Marguerite Chapman as two Russians trapped in a collapsed building with seven enemy German soldiers during World War II. It was adapted from the 1943 Broadway play Counterattack by Janet and Philip Stevenson, which was in turn based on the play Pobyeda by Ilya Vershinin and Mikhail Ruderman. It was one of a number pro-Soviet American films created during the war.

== Plot ==
In 1942, both Nazi Germany and the Soviet Union are gathering forces and supplies in one particular sector of the Eastern Front for a major attack. By night, the Soviets are secretly constructing a bridge across a river. To avoid detection, it is being built underwater, 500mm (20 inches) below the surface.

In an attempt to find out where the Germans plan to strike, Colonel Semenov has a small paratrooper unit dropped behind enemy lines to attack a divisional headquarters and hopefully take an officer prisoner for interrogation. The local partisans, led by the wily Kostyuk, provide a guide, Lisa Elenko.

The attack succeeds at first. Alexei Kulkov, one of the paratroopers, takes seven Germans prisoner in the basement. Then, just as Elenko brings him a message, German artillery hits the building, causing part of it to collapse. They are trapped in the spacious cellar.

Kulkov is in no hurry to dig out. Though the prisoners rank no higher than a sergeant, he is convinced one of them is an officer in disguise, based on a monogrammed pistol and a monocle he has found. He begins questioning the men one by one, but while he rules out ex-miner Stillman and a former magician, he cannot pinpoint his man.

Meanwhile, Kulkov's dog sniffs out where his master is buried and starts digging. This alerts one of Kulkov's comrades, who communicates with him by tapping on a metal pipe in code. Told that Kulkov has caught an officer, he leaves to get help.

An eighth German soldier, thought to be dead, wakes up and attacks. In the struggle, the lone lantern is extinguished and Elenko is stabbed in the shoulder. However, Kulkov kills the man and regains control of the situation. Oddly, Elenko is certain that one of the Germans tried to help her in the darkness.

Kulkov decides to try a ploy. He orders the magician to go around the corner of the main room out of sight of the others. He knocks the German out and then fires one round, making the rest think he has exacted revenge for the attack. He repeats the charade with the defiant sergeant. The third man Kulkov picks admits he is Major Erich von Sturmer. Stillman cannot hide his anger against the major for allowing two of his men to be "shot" before revealing his identity.

A cat and mouse game ensues, as Kulkov and von Sturmer try to extract from the other the enemy's plans. Finally, they make a deal; as each is confident of being rescued by his own side, he will reveal what he knows. Kulkov cleverly tells the truth, but in such a way that von Sturmer does not believe him. But then, during a heated exchange, Kulkov reveals the secret of the bridge.

When Elenko weakens, Kulkov has to guard the prisoners by himself without rest. She urges him to kill them immediately, but Kulkov refuses, hoping he can find out what he came for. Finally, he dozes off, but is awakened by a shout from Stillman, who joins the Russians. He is given a rifle (shown in the end to have no bullets) to stand guard, though Kulkov is careful to stay behind him.

Then, digging is heard. To Kulkov's dismay, he hears German voices. Von Sturmer taunts him, revealing the truth about the German attack and boasting about his earlier lie. When he rushes to the blocked entrance, Kulkov shoots him and prepares to kill everyone else. But to his delight, his dog is first through the opening in the rubble. The Germans digging were prisoners; the Soviets have launched their offensive and reached the building. Kulkov passes along the vital information he has obtained from von Sturmer to Colonel Semenov, and then Kulkov collapses from fatigue.

== Cast ==
- Paul Muni as Alexei Kulkov
- Marguerite Chapman as Lisa Elenko
- Larry Parks as Kirichenko
- Harro Meller as Ernemann / Major Erich von Sturmer
- Roman Bohnen as Kostyuk
- George Macready as Colonel Semenov
- Erik Rolf as Vassilev
- Ludwig Donath as Corporal "the Professor" Müller
- Rudolph Anders as Stillman
- Philip Van Zandt as Galkronye
- Frederick Giermann as Ludwig Weiler
- Wolfgang Zilzer as Krafft (as Paul Andor)
- Ivan Triesault as Sergeant Johann Grillparzer
- Louis Adlon as Huebsch
- Darren McGavin as Paratrooper (uncredited)

== Reception ==
Counter-Attack was a critical success but a box-office failure, probably because the war ended in Europe soon after it was released. As the Cold War developed, the fact that the Soviet Union was depicted sympathetically in the film began to be seen as inappropriate and suspicious. Moreover, the three principal writers (Lawson and the Stevensons), one actor (Parks), and the production supervisor Sidney Buchman were all blacklisted due to suspected Communist affiliations. Bosley Crowther gave the film a generally positive review in The New York Times, describing it as containing "both the virtues and the faults of most films in that genre" of psychological examinations during war. Crowther criticized Chapman's character as having "her main contribution and performance" of the film" be "holding a gun", the film's one-room setting as "bewildering" for Muni's character to occupy, and the story as "rather rigidly and narrowly confined, which limits the range of activity and tends occasionally to bore", but found that "once the situation is accepted and all practical doubts are dismissed, the steady development of the drama becomes absorbing and excitingly tense."
