= Page One Award =

American journalism award

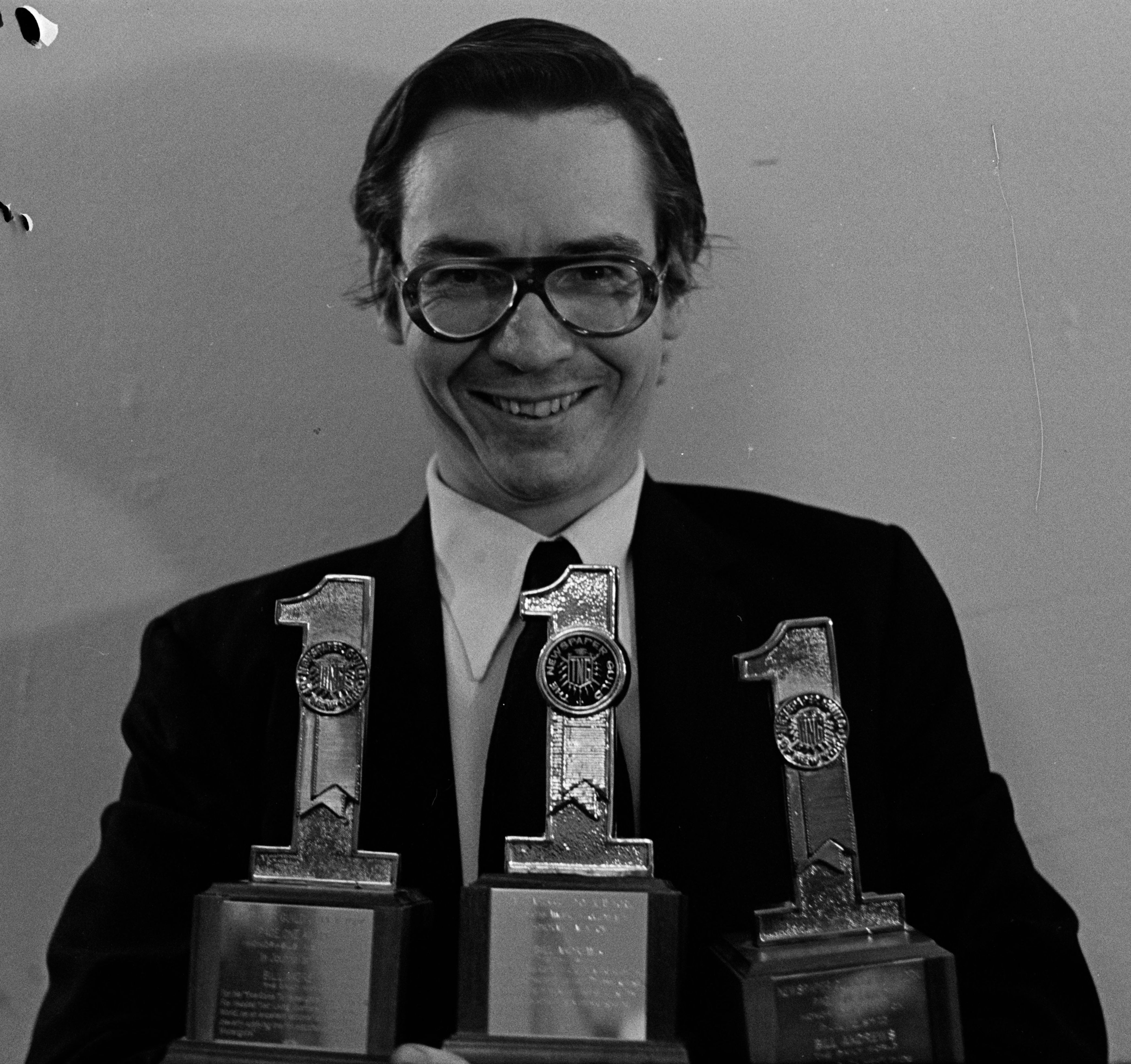
- Bill Andrews, cartoonist for the Daily World, with three Page One Awards awarded to him in 1972, 1973 and 1974
- Awarded for: Crusading Journalism; Local Reporting; National Reporting; Foreign Reporting; and Business Reporting
- Country: United States
- Presented by: Newspaper Guild of New York

The Page One Awards were a series of annual awards given by the Newspaper Guild of New York for achievements in the United States in journalism, public affairs, labor, science, and entertainment.

== History ==
The New York chapter of the American Newspaper Guild established the Page One Awards. A committee was formed to recognize excellence in public affairs, journalism, books, science, theater, motion pictures, musical comedy, popular music, and sports. The award was presented at the union's annual Page One Ball, which began in the mid-1930s.

Over the years, the Guild presented Bill Gallo with 20 Page One Awards, the largest number awarded to a single recipient.

== Past recipients ==
- 1945 – (United States) General Dwight Eisenhower
- 1945 – (United States) Eleanor Roosevelt
- 1945 – (United States) Bing Crosby
- 1945 – (United States) Jo Davidson
- 1945 – (United States) Ingrid Bergman
- 1945 – (United States) Fibber McGee and Molly
- 1945 – (United States) Gene Kelly
- 1945 – (United States) Hank Greenberg
- 1945 – (United States) Laurette Taylor
- 1946 – (United States) Pearl Primus
- 1946 – (United States) Joe Louis
- 1946 – (United States) Camilla Williams
- 1947 – (United States) William S. Gailmor
- 1947 – (United States) A. J. Liebling
- 1948 – (United States) Carey McWilliams
- 1950 – (United States) John Hersey
- 1952 – (United States) Vivien Leigh
- 1952 – (United States) Jose Ferrer
- 1952 – (United States) Jimmie Durante
- 1955 – (United States) Thurgood Marshall
- 1957 – (United States) Bob Cousy
- 1964 – (United States) Roger Higgins
- 1968 – (United States) Martin Gershen

== See also ==
- Newspaper Guild of New York
