= The Law vs. Billy the Kid =

1954 film by William Castle

- Directed by: William Castle
- Screenplay by: Bernard Gordon; Janet Stevenson; Philip Stevenson
- Produced by: Sam Katzman
- Starring: Scott Brady; Betta St. John; Paul Cavanagh
- Cinematography: Henry Freulich
- Edited by: Aaron Stell
- Music by: Mischa Bakaleinikoff
- Color process: Technicolor
- Production company: Clover Productions
- Distributed by: Columbia Pictures
- Release date: August 1, 1954
- Running time: 72 minutes
- Country: United States
- Language: English

The Law vs. Billy the Kid is a 1954 American Western film directed by William Castle and starring Scott Brady, Betta St. John and Paul Cavanagh. It was produced by Sam Katzman for distribution by Columbia Pictures.

== Plot ==
Cheated out of a half month's pay, William Bonney takes his money anyway and rides off. He kills one of the men who pursues him and soon becomes better known in the territory as Billy the Kid.

Pat Garrett, a cowboy who considers Billy a friend, finds him a job at British land baron John Tunstall's giant ranch in New Mexico. Rustlers are causing Tunstall trouble and he asks Garrett and Billy to help protect his property. Billy tries to go straight, partly because he's fallen in love with a local beauty, Nita Maxwell.

Bob Olinger, a brutal foreman, takes a dislike to Billy and beats him up. Olinger also goes to a crooked lawman, Watkins, to dig up a wanted poster on Billy and insist on his arrest.

A posse comes looking for Billy and kills Tunstall by mistake. Billy guns down the man who pulled the trigger. The governor of New Mexico wants to replace Watkins and asks Garrett to take the job. Garrett declines until the governor vows to institute martial law and have Billy shot on sight. Billy tries to go along with Garrett peaceably, but others like Olinger demand that he hang.

Billy kills Olinger and flees. He tries to get to Nita with a wedding ring and a proposal they begin a new life in Mexico, but then he is shot dead by Garrett.

== Cast ==
- Scott Brady as Billy the Kid
- Betta St. John as Nita Maxwell
- James Griffith as Pat Garrett
- Alan Hale, Jr. as Bob Olinger
- Paul Cavanagh as John Tunstall
- Steve Darrell as Sheriff Tom Watkins
- William Tannen as Dave Rudabaugh
- William "Bill" Phillips as Charlie Bowdre
- Benny Rubin as Arnold Dodge
- George Berkeley as Tom O'Folliard
- Richard H. Cutting as Pete Maxwell
- Gregg Barton as Parson Ranch Hand
- John Cason as Nate, a posse member
- John Cliff as Carl Trumble
- Bill Coontz as Garrett posse member
- William Fawcett as W.L. Parson
- Eddie Foster as Pedro
- Martin Garralaga as Miguel Bolanos
- Otis Garth as Gov. Lew Wallace
- Robert Griffin as L.G. Murphy
- Al Haskell as cantina bartender
- Rory Mallinson as slim
- Philo McCullough as hangman on scaffold
- Bud Osborne as Tunstall ranch hand
- Frank Sully as Deputy Jack Poe
- Jack Tornek as a townsman
- Tony Urchel as the cantina barfly
