= Hollywood blacklist =

Banning of Communists from U.S. entertainment

Members of the Hollywood Ten and their families in 1950, protesting the impending incarceration of the Ten

The Hollywood blacklist was the mid-20th century banning of suspected Communists from working in the United States entertainment industry. The blacklist began at the onset of the Cold War and Red Scare, and affected entertainment production in Hollywood, New York, and elsewhere. Actors, screenwriters, directors, musicians, and other professionals were barred from employment based on their present or past membership in, alleged membership in, or perceived sympathy with the Communist Party USA (CPUSA), or on the basis of their refusal to assist Congressional or FBI investigations into the Party's activities.

Even during the period of its strictest enforcement from the late 1940s to late 1950s, the blacklist was rarely made explicit nor was it easily verifiable. Instead, it was the result of numerous individual decisions implemented by studio executives and was not the result of formal legal statute. Nevertheless, the blacklist directly damaged or ended the careers and incomes of scores of persons working in film, television, and radio.

Although the blacklist had no official end date, it was generally recognized to have weakened by 1960, the year when Dalton Trumbo – a CPUSA member from 1943 to 1948, and also one of the "Hollywood Ten" – was openly hired by director Otto Preminger to write the screenplay for Exodus (1960). Several months later, actor Kirk Douglas publicly acknowledged that Trumbo wrote the screenplay for Spartacus (1960). Despite Trumbo's breakthrough in 1960, other blacklisted film artists continued to have difficulty obtaining work for years afterward.

== Hollywood Ten and beyond ==
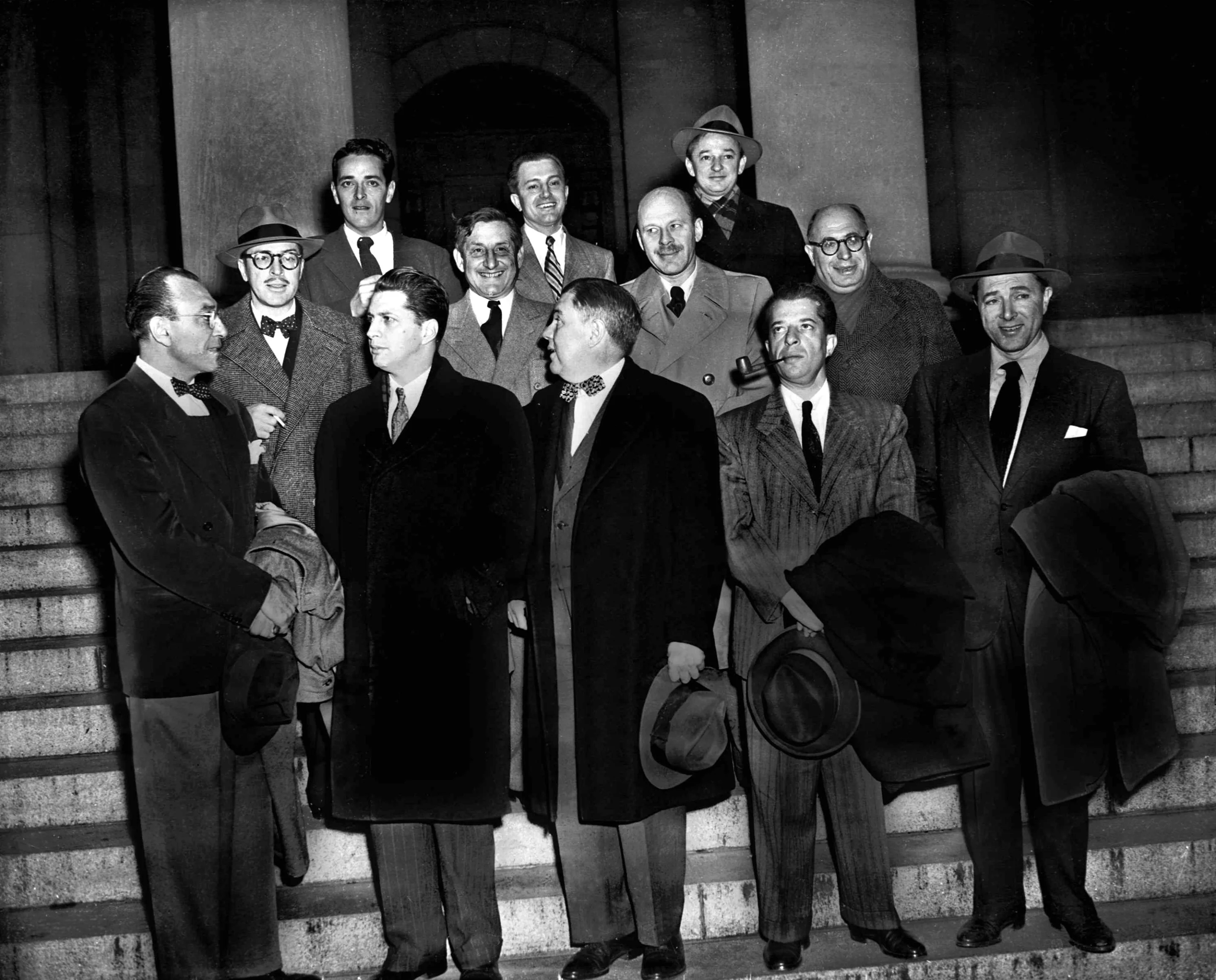
"The Hollywood Ten" stand with their attorneys outside district court in Washington, D.C. before arraignment on contempt of Congress charges. The ten were charged for refusing to cooperate with the House Un-American Activities Committee. (Front row, L-R): Herbert Biberman, attorney Martin Popper, attorney Robert W. Kenny, Albert Maltz and Lester Cole. (Second row, L-R): Dalton Trumbo, John Howard Lawson, Alvah Bessie and Samuel Ornitz. (Top row, L-R): Ring Lardner Jr., Edward Dmytryk and Adrian Scott.

The first systematic Hollywood blacklist was instituted on November 25, 1947, the day after ten left-wing screenwriters and directors were cited for contempt of Congress for refusing to answer questions before the House Un-American Activities Committee (HUAC). The ten men – Alvah Bessie, Herbert Biberman, Lester Cole, Edward Dmytryk, Ring Lardner Jr., John Howard Lawson, Albert Maltz, Samuel Ornitz, Adrian Scott and Dalton Trumbo – had been subpoenaed by the committee in late September to testify about their Communist affiliations and associates. The contempt citation included a criminal charge that led to a highly publicized trial and conviction, with a maximum of one year in jail in addition to a $1,000 fine ($13,400 today).

The Congressional action prompted a group of studio executives, acting under the aegis of the Association of Motion Picture Producers, to suspend without pay these ten film artists – initially labeled "The Unfriendly Ten" but soon changed to "The Hollywood Ten" – and to pledge that "thereafter no Communists or other subversives would 'knowingly' be employed in Hollywood." The blacklist eventually expanded beyond ten into the hundreds. On June 22, 1950, a pamphlet-style book entitled Red Channels was published. Focused on the field of broadcasting, it identified 151 entertainment industry professionals as "Red Fascists and their sympathizers" who had infiltrated radio and television. It was not long before those named, along with a host of other artists, were barred from employment in the entertainment field.

== History ==
=== Background ===
The Hollywood blacklist was rooted in events of the 1930s and early 1940s, encompassing the depths of the Great Depression, the Spanish Civil War, and the U.S.-Soviet alliance in World War II. The widespread economic hardships in the 1930s, as well as the rise of fascism in the world, caused a surge in Communist Party USA (CPUSA) membership. Levels had remained below 20,000 until 1933 and then steadily grew during the decade until reaching 66,000 in 1939. Although the CPUSA lost substantial support after the Moscow show trials of 1936–1938 and the Molotov–Ribbentrop Pact of 1939, the organization's membership was still well above its pre-1933 levels.

With this as a backdrop, the U.S. government began turning its attention to possible links between the CPUSA and Hollywood. Under then-chairman Martin Dies, Jr., the HUAC released a report in 1938 claiming that communism was pervasive in the movie industry. Two years later, Dies privately took testimony from a former Communist Party member, John L. Leech, who named forty-two movie professionals as Communists. After Leech repeated his charges in supposed confidence to a Los Angeles grand jury, many of the names were leaked to the press, including those of stars Humphrey Bogart, James Cagney, Katharine Hepburn, Melvyn Douglas and Fredric March, among other Hollywood figures. Dies said he would "clear" those who cooperated by meeting with him in what he termed "executive session". Within two weeks of the grand jury leak, all those on the list except for actress Jean Muir had met with the HUAC chairman. Dies "cleared" everyone except actor Lionel Stander, who was fired by the movie studio, Republic Pictures, where he was under contract.

Two major film industry strikes during the 1930s had exacerbated tensions between Hollywood producers and unionized employees, particularly the Screen Writers Guild, which formed in 1933. In 1941, producer Walt Disney took out an ad in Variety, the industry trade magazine, declaring his conviction that "Communist agitation" was behind a cartoonists and animators' strike. According to historians Larry Ceplair and Steven Englund, "In actuality, the strike had resulted from Disney's overbearing paternalism, high-handedness, and insensitivity." Inspired by Disney, California State Senator Jack Tenney, chairman of the state legislature's Joint Fact-Finding Committee on Un-American Activities, launched an investigation of "Reds in movies". The probe fell flat, and was mocked in Variety headlines.

The wartime alliance between the United States and the Soviet Union brought the CPUSA newfound credibility. During the war, Party membership climbed back up to 50,000. As World War II drew to a close, however, perceptions changed again, with communism increasingly becoming a focus of American fears and hatred. In 1945, Gerald L. K. Smith, founder of the neofascist America First Party, began giving speeches in Los Angeles assailing the "alien minded Russian Jews in Hollywood." Mississippi congressman John E. Rankin, an HUAC member, held a press conference to declare that "one of the most dangerous plots ever instigated for the overthrow of this Government has its headquarters in Hollywood ... the greatest hotbed of subversive activities in the United States." Rankin promised, "We're on the trail of the tarantula now, and we're going to follow through."

Reports of Soviet repression in Eastern and Central Europe in the war's aftermath added more fuel to what became known as the "Second Red Scare". The growth of conservative political influence and the Republican triumph in the 1946 midterm elections, which saw the GOP take control of both the House and Senate, led to a major revival of institutional anti-communist activity, publicly spearheaded by the HUAC but with an investigative push by J. Edgar Hoover and the FBI. The following year, the Motion Picture Alliance for the Preservation of American Ideals (MPA), a political action group co-founded by James Kevin McGuinness, issued a pamphlet written by Ayn Rand and entitled "Screen Guide for Americans". It advised film producers on the avoidance of "subtle communistic touches" in their films. The pamphlet's advice was encapsulated in a list of ideological prohibitions, such as "Don't Smear the Free Enterprise System", "Don't Smear Industrialists", "Don't Smear Wealth", "Don't Smear the Profit Motive", "Don't Deify 'the Common Man'", and "Don't Glorify the Collective."

=== Beginning (1946–1947) ===
On July 29, 1946, William R. Wilkerson, publisher and founder of The Hollywood Reporter (THR), titled his front-page "Tradeviews" column, "A Vote for Joe Stalin". In the column, Wilkerson named as Communist sympathizers Dalton Trumbo, Maurice Rapf, Lester Cole, Howard Koch, Harold Buchman, John Wexley, Ring Lardner Jr., Harold Salemson, Henry Meyers, Theodore Strauss, and John Howard Lawson. Over the next two months, Wilkerson published more columns containing names of other suspected Communists and "fellow travelers" working in Hollywood. His daily column earned the moniker "Billy's Blacklist" or simply "Billy's List". When Wilkerson died in 1962, his THR obituary stated that he had "named names, pseudonyms and card numbers and was widely credited with being chiefly responsible for preventing communists from becoming entrenched in Hollywood production – something that foreign film unions have been unable to do." In a 65th-anniversary article in 2012, Wilkerson's son apologized for THR's role in the blacklist and added that his father was motivated by revenge for his own thwarted ambition to own a film studio.

In late September 1947, drawing upon the lists provided in The Hollywood Reporter, the House Un-American Activities Committee subpoenaed 42 persons working in the film industry to testify at hearings. The HUAC had declared its intention to investigate whether Communist agents were sneaking propaganda into American films.

Of the people subpoenaed by the HUAC, 23 were deemed "friendly", some of whom had previously testified in closed HUAC sessions at the Biltmore Hotel in Los Angeles. The October hearings in Washington, D.C. began with appearances by 14 friendly witnesses, among them Walt Disney, Jack L. Warner, Gary Cooper, Ronald Reagan, Robert Taylor, Adolphe Menjou, screenwriter Jack Moffitt (who was later employed at THR by Wilkerson), and MGM producer and story editor James K. McGuinness. Disney asserted that the threat of Communists in the film industry was a serious one, and he named specific ex-employees as probable Communists. Reagan, who was then president of the Screen Actors Guild, testified that a small clique within his union was using "communist-like tactics" in attempting to steer union policy, but that he did not know if those (unnamed) members were Communists or not, and that in any case he thought the union had them under control. Adolphe Menjou declared: "I am a witch hunter if the witches are Communists. I am a Red-baiter. I would like to see them all back in Russia."

Unlike the friendly witnesses, other leading Hollywood figures – including directors John Huston, Billy Wilder, and William Wyler; and actors Lauren Bacall, Lucille Ball, Humphrey Bogart, Bette Davis, Henry Fonda, John Garfield, Judy Garland, Sterling Hayden, Katharine Hepburn, Danny Kaye, Gene Kelly, Myrna Loy, and Edward G. Robinson – protested the HUAC and formed the Committee for the First Amendment (CFA). A sizable CFA delegation flew to Washington, D.C. on a chartered plane in October to voice their opposition to the government's political harassment of the film industry. A few CFA members, such as Hayden, had privately assured Bogart they were not Communists. During the HUAC hearings, a local Washington paper reported that Hayden was in fact a Communist. After returning to Hollywood, Bogart shouted at Danny Kaye, "You fuckers sold me out." The CFA was attacked for being naïve. Under pressure from Warner Bros. to distance himself from the purported Hollywood Reds, Bogart negotiated a statement, syndicated in Hearst newspapers under the title "As Bogart Sees It Now", which did not denounce the CFA but said his trip to D.C. had been "ill-advised, even foolish." Billy Wilder told the other committee members that "we oughta fold."

Besides the twenty-three friendly witnesses, there were also nineteen "unfriendly" or "hostile witnesses" who announced they would not cooperate with the HUAC. Many of the nineteen were alleged to be CPUSA members. Thirteen of them were Jewish. When the hearings for the "Hollywood Nineteen" commenced on Monday, October 27, the nation's attention was riveted, especially given the presence in Washington, D.C. of movie stars from the First Amendment Committee.

As it turned out, only eleven of the nineteen were called to testify. One of them, émigré playwright Bertolt Brecht, decided after legal advice to answer the HUAC's questions, though he did so evasively and fled the U.S. the very next day, never to return. The other ten refused to answer whether they were in the Screen Writers Guild or CPUSA, citing their First Amendment right to freedom of speech, opinion, and association. Most of the Ten challenged the legitimacy of the committee itself. John Howard Lawson said during his testimony: "I am not on trial here, Mr. Chairman. This committee is on trial here before the American people. Let us get that straight." Among the questions they declined to answer was the one now generally rendered as, "Are you now, or have you ever been, a member of the Communist Party?".^{[a]} The HUAC formally charged the ten men with contempt of Congress and began criminal proceedings against them in the full House of Representatives.

In light of the Hollywood Ten's defiance of the HUAC – in addition to refusing to answer questions, they also tried unsuccessfully to read opening statements decrying the House committee's investigation as unconstitutional – political pressure mounted on the film industry to demonstrate its "anti-subversive" bona fides. Late in the hearings, Eric Johnston, president of the Motion Picture Association of America (MPAA), vowed to the committee that he would never "employ any proven or admitted Communist because they are just a disruptive force, and I don't want them around."

On November 17, the Screen Actors Guild (SAG) voted to make its officers swear a loyalty pledge asserting each was not a Communist. On November 24, the House of Representatives voted 346 to 17 to approve citations against the Hollywood Ten for contempt of Congress. The next day, after a meeting of nearly 50 film industry executives at New York City's Waldorf-Astoria hotel, MPAA President Johnston issued a press release that is today referred to as the Waldorf Statement.^{[b]} The statement said the ten uncooperative witnesses would be fired or suspended without pay and not re-employed until they were cleared of contempt charges and had sworn that they were not Communists. The first Hollywood blacklist was in effect.

=== Growth (1948–1950) ===
The HUAC hearings failed to turn up any proof that Hollywood was secretly disseminating Communist propaganda, but the industry was nonetheless transformed. The fallout from the inquiry was a factor in the decision by Floyd Odlum, the primary owner of RKO Pictures, to leave the industry. As a result, the studio passed into the hands of Howard Hughes. Within weeks of taking over in May 1948, Hughes fired most of RKO's employees and virtually shut the studio down for six months while he had the political views of the remaining employees investigated. Then, just as RKO swung back into production, Hughes made the decision to settle a long-standing federal antitrust suit against the Big Five studios. This was one of the crucial steps in the collapse of the studio system that had governed Hollywood for a quarter-century.

In early 1948, all of the Hollywood Ten were convicted of contempt. Following a series of unsuccessful appeals, the cases arrived before the Supreme Court. Among the submissions filed in defense of the Ten was an amicus curiae brief signed by 204 Hollywood professionals. After the court denied review, the ten men began serving their prison sentences in 1950. One of them, screenwriter Dalton Trumbo, said during an interview for the documentary film Hollywood On Trial (1976):

As far as I was concerned, it was a completely just verdict. I had contempt for that Congress and have had contempt for several since. And on the basis of guilt or innocence, I could never really complain very much. That this was a crime or misdemeanor was the complaint, my complaint.

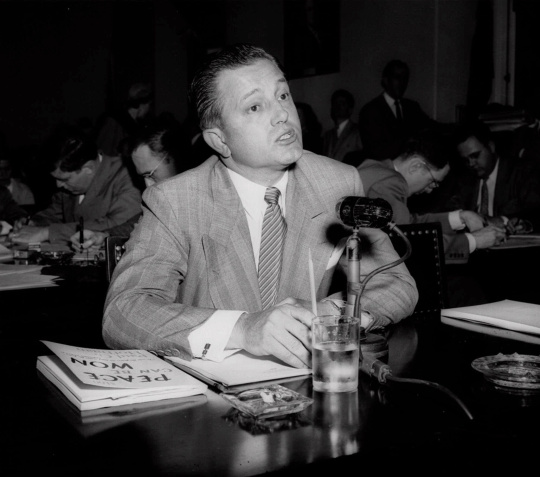
Dmytryk cooperating with the HUAC

In September 1950, Hollywood Ten member Edward Dmytryk announced that he had once been a Communist and was prepared to give evidence against others who had been as well. He was released from prison after five months. Following his 1951 HUAC appearance, where he described his past Party membership and named names, his directorial career recovered.

The other nine remained silent and most were unable to obtain work in American film and television for many years. Adrian Scott, who had produced four of Dmytryk's films – Murder, My Sweet; Cornered; So Well Remembered; and Crossfire – was one of those named by his former friend. Scott's next screen credit did not come until 1972 and he never produced another feature film. Some blacklisted writers managed to work surreptitiously (an option unavailable to actors, directors and producers), using pseudonyms or the names of friends who posed as the actual writers. Those who allowed their names to be used in this fashion were called "fronts".

Of the 204 who signed the amicus brief on behalf of the Hollywood Ten, 84 were themselves blacklisted. There was a general chilling effect in the entertainment business. Humphrey Bogart, who had been a key member of the Committee for the First Amendment, felt compelled to write an essay, printed in the May 1948 issue of Photoplay magazine, that vigorously denied he was a Communist sympathizer. The Tenney Committee, which had continued its state-level investigations, summoned songwriter Ira Gershwin to explain his involvement with the First Amendment Committee because involvement alone was sufficient to arouse suspicion.

The May 7, 1948, issue of the Counterattack newsletter warned readers about a radio talk show that had recently expanded its audience by moving from the Mutual network to ABC: "Communist Party members and fellow-travelers have often been guests on [Arthur] Gaeth's program."

A number of non-governmental organizations participated in enforcing and expanding the blacklist; in particular, the American Legion, the conservative war veterans' group, was instrumental in pressuring the studios to ban Communists and fellow travelers. In 1949, the Americanism Division of the Legion issued its own blacklist – a roster of 128 people who it claimed were part of the "Communist Conspiracy". Among the names on the Legion's list was that of playwright Lillian Hellman. Hellman had written or contributed to the screenplays of approximately ten motion pictures up to that point; she was not employed again by a Hollywood studio until 1966.

Another influential group was American Business Consultants Inc., founded in 1947. In the subscription information for its weekly publication Counterattack, "The Newsletter of Facts to Combat Communism", it declared that it was run by "a group of former FBI men. It has no affiliation whatsoever with any government agency." Notwithstanding that claim, it seems the editors of Counterattack had direct access to the files of both the Federal Bureau of Investigation and HUAC; the results of that access became widely apparent with the June 1950 publication of Red Channels. This Counterattack spinoff listed 151 people in entertainment and broadcast journalism, along with records of their involvement in what the pamphlet meant to be taken as Communist or pro-Communist activities. A few of those named, such as Hellman, were already being denied employment in the motion picture, TV, and radio fields; the publication of Red Channels meant that scores more were placed on the blacklist. That year, CBS instituted a loyalty oath which it required of all its employees.

Jean Muir was the first performer to lose employment because of a listing in Red Channels. In 1950, Muir was named as a Communist sympathizer in the pamphlet, and was immediately removed from the cast of the television sitcom The Aldrich Family, in which she had been cast as Mrs. Aldrich. NBC had received between 20 and 30 phone calls protesting her being in the show. General Foods, the sponsor, said it would not sponsor programs that featured "controversial persons". Though the company later received thousands of calls protesting the decision, it was not reversed.

=== HUAC return (1951–1952) ===
In 1951, with the U.S. Congress now under Democratic control, HUAC launched a second investigation of communism in Hollywood. As actor Larry Parks said when called before the panel,

Don't present me with the choice of either being in contempt of this committee and going to jail or forcing me to really crawl through the mud to be an informer. For what purpose? I don't think it is a choice at all. I don't think this is really sportsmanlike. I don't think this is American. I don't think this is American justice.

Parks ultimately testified, becoming, albeit reluctantly, a "friendly witness", and found himself blacklisted anyway.

The legal tactics of those refusing to testify had changed by this time. Instead of relying on the First Amendment, they invoked the Fifth Amendment's shield against self-incrimination (although, as before, Communist Party membership was not illegal). While this usually allowed a witness to avoid "naming names" without being indicted for contempt of Congress, "taking the Fifth" in one's HUAC testimony guaranteed membership on the industry blacklist.

Historians sometimes distinguish between (a) the "official blacklist" – i.e., the names of those who were called by the HUAC and, in whatever manner, refused to cooperate or were identified as Communists in the hearings – and (b) the graylist – those who were denied work because of their political or personal affiliations, real or imagined. The consequences of being on either list were largely the same. The graylist also refers more specifically to those who were denied work by the major studios but could still find jobs on Poverty Row: Composer Elmer Bernstein, for instance, was called before the HUAC when it was discovered he had written some music reviews for a Communist newspaper. After he refused to name names, pointing out that he had never attended a Communist Party meeting, he found himself composing music for movies such as Cat Women of the Moon.

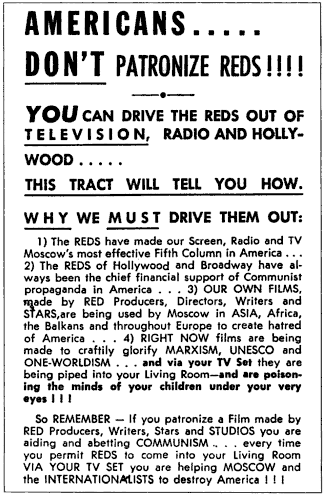
Anti-communist tract from the 1950s, decrying the "REDS of Hollywood and Broadway"

While there were film artists like Parks and Dmytryk who eventually cooperated with the HUAC, other friendly witnesses gave damaging testimony with less apparent hesitation or reluctance, most notably director Elia Kazan and screenwriter Budd Schulberg. Their willingness to describe the political leanings of their friends and professional associates effectively brought a halt to dozens of careers. After being named, a number of artists departed for Mexico or Europe to find employment. Director Jules Dassin was among the best known of the Hollywood exiles. Briefly a Communist, he dropped out of the Party in 1939. He was blacklisted after Dmytryk and fellow filmmaker Frank Tuttle named him at HUAC hearings. Dassin left for France, and spent much of his remaining career in Greece.

The HUAC hearings sometimes swept onto the blacklist those who had no plausible connection to the search for Communist infiltration. In his book The Great Fear about McCarthy-era purges, David Caute writes:

Particularly bewildered were the quite numerous victims whose names or faces were confused with those on the list. The actor Everett Sloane suffered because his name resembled that of the scriptwriter and self-professed former Communist Allan E. Sloane; when the actress Madeline Lee, a specialist in radio baby noises, was blacklisted, three other actresses, innocent of all political activity, faced ruin – one because she was called Madeline Lee, one (Camila Ashland) because she resembled Madeline Lee and one (Madeleine Pierce) because she too was a proven baby-gurgler. John Cogley cited the case of an actor who spent four years trying to prove that he could not have served in the Abraham Lincoln Brigade.

The hunt for subversives extended into every branch of the entertainment industry. In the field of animation, two studios in particular were affected: United Productions of America (UPA) fired a large portion of its staff, while the New York-based Tempo Productions was entirely destroyed. HUAC investigations could destroy families as well. For example, screenwriter Richard Collins, after a brief period on the blacklist, became a friendly witness and abandoned his wife, actress Dorothy Comingore, who refused to name names. After divorcing Comingore, Collins gained custody of the couple's young son and daughter. The family's story was dramatized in the film Guilty by Suspicion (1991), in which a character based on Comingore "commits suicide rather than endure a long mental collapse." In real life, Comingore succumbed to alcoholism and died of a pulmonary disease at age 58. According to historians Paul Buhle and David Wagner, "premature strokes and heart attacks were fairly common [among blacklistees], along with heavy drinking as a form of suicide on the installment plan."

For all that transpired in the HUAC hearings, the proof that Communists actually used Hollywood films as vehicles for subversion remained hard to come by. Schulberg reported how his manuscript for the novel What Makes Sammy Run? (later a screenplay also) had been subject to ideological critique by Hollywood Ten writer John Howard Lawson, whose comments he had solicited. But the significance of such interactions may have been exaggerated. As historian Gerald Horne notes, many Hollywood screenwriters had joined or associated with the local CPUSA chapter not because of allegiance to communism, but because the CPUSA chapter "offered a collective to a profession that was enmeshed in tremendous isolation at the typewriter. Their 'Writers' Clinic' had 'an informal "board" of respected screenwriters' – including Lawson and Ring Lardner Jr. – 'who read and commented upon any screenplay submitted to them. Although their criticism could be plentiful, stinging, and (sometimes) politically dogmatic, the author was entirely free to accept it or reject it as he or she pleased without incurring the slightest "consequence" or sanction.'" Much of the onscreen evidence of Communist influence uncovered by the HUAC was flimsy at best. One witness remembered Lionel Stander, while performing in a film, whistling the left-wing "Internationale" as his character waited for an elevator. "Another noted that screenwriter Lester Cole had inserted lines from a famous pro-Loyalist speech by La Pasionaria about it being 'better to die on your feet than to live on your knees' into a pep talk delivered by a football coach."

Others have argued that Communists did affect the film industry by suppressing production of works they politically opposed. In a Reason magazine article entitled "Hollywood's Missing Movies", Kenneth Billingsley cites a case where Trumbo "bragged" in the Daily Worker about quashing films with anti-Soviet content: among them were proposed adaptations of Arthur Koestler's anti-totalitarian books Darkness at Noon and The Yogi and the Commissar, which described the rise of communism in Russia, and Victor Kravchenko's I Chose Freedom. Authors Ronald and Allis Radosh make a similar point in Red Star over Hollywood that prominent anti-Communist books were only influential "in the rare intellectual atmosphere of the East Coast" but were kept apart from Hollywood's consideration.

=== Height (1952–1956) ===
In 1952, the Screen Writers Guild – founded in 1933 by three future members of the Hollywood Ten – amended its screen credit rules to authorize the studios to omit the names of any individuals who had failed to clear themselves before Congress. This agreement prevented a recurrence of what happened in 1950. That's when the blacklisted Dalton Trumbo inadvertently received screen credit for having written, years earlier, the story on which the screenplay for Columbia Pictures' Emergency Wedding was based. But "lapses" of that kind were not repeated. There were no more instances of film accrediting of blacklisted individuals until 1960. For example, the name of Albert Maltz, who had written the original screenplay for The Robe in the mid-1940s, was nowhere to be seen when the movie was released in 1953.

As William O'Neill notes, pressure was maintained even on those who had ostensibly been cleared:

On December 27, 1952, the American Legion announced that it disapproved of a new film, Moulin Rouge, starring José Ferrer, who used to be no more progressive than hundreds of other actors and had already been grilled by HUAC. The picture itself was based on the life of Toulouse-Lautrec and was totally apolitical. Nine members of the Legion had picketed it anyway, giving rise to the controversy. By this time, people were not taking any chances. Ferrer immediately wired the Legion's national commander that he would be glad to join the veterans in their "fight against communism".

The group's efforts dragged many others onto the blacklist: In 1954, "[s]creenwriter Louis Pollock, a man without any known political views or associations, suddenly had his career yanked out from under him because the American Legion confused him with Louis Pollack, a California clothier, who had refused to co-operate with HUAC." Orson Bean recalled that he had briefly been placed on the blacklist after dating a member of the Party, despite his own politics being conservative.

During this same period, a number of powerful newspaper columnists covering the entertainment industry, including Walter Winchell, Hedda Hopper, Victor Riesel, Jack O'Brian, and George Sokolsky, regularly suggested names that should be added to the blacklist. Actor John Ireland received an out-of-court settlement to end a 1954 lawsuit against the Young & Rubicam advertising agency, which had ordered him dropped from the lead role in a TV series it sponsored. Variety described it as "the first industry admission of what has for some time been an open secret – that the threat of being labeled a political non-conformist, or worse, has been used against show business personalities, and that a screening system is at work determining these [actors'] availabilities for roles."

Storm Center, the first Hollywood movie to overtly take on McCarthyism, was released in 1956. Bette Davis "plays a small-town librarian who refuses, on principle, to remove a book called The Communist Dream from the shelves when the local council deems it subversive."

The Hollywood blacklist had long gone hand in hand with the Red-baiting activities of J. Edgar Hoover's FBI. Adversaries of HUAC such as lawyer Bartley Crum – who defended Hollywood Ten members in front of the committee – were themselves branded as Communist sympathizers and targeted for investigation. The FBI tapped Crum's phones, opened his mail, and placed him under continuous surveillance. As a consequence, he lost most of his clients and, unable to cope with the stress of ceaseless harassment, committed suicide in 1959. Intimidating and dividing the left is now seen as a central purpose of the HUAC hearings. Fund-raising for once-popular humanitarian efforts became difficult, and despite the sympathies of many in the industry there was little open support in Hollywood for causes such as the Civil Rights Movement and the opposition to nuclear weapons testing.

During the era of McCarthyism, the Hollywood Ten faced legal and constitutional challenges in their defiance of the House Un-American Activities Committee (HUAC). Writers such as Ring Lardner Jr., Dalton Trumbo, and John Howard Lawson used their testimonies not only as acts of resistance but as statements against what they saw as an abuse of governmental power, according to author Alan Casty. Lardner’s exchanges with the committee typically featured quotes such as, “I could answer it, but if I did, I would hate myself in the morning,” which highlighted his awareness of the moral and legal trap the hearings posed. Similarly, Trumbo’s refusal to submit to the committee’s rigid questioning, insisting that “very many questions can be answered ‘Yes’ or ‘No’ only by a moron or a slave,” hinted at a broader constitutional issue at stake: the right to free expression and protection against self-incrimination, as claimed by the accused. Lawson, in turn, directly confronted HUAC’s authority, arguing that its inquiry was an invasion of the fundamental rights people had as Americans and an attempt at screen censorship. The Hollywood Ten, following a strategy, framed their defiance as a defense of civil liberties, turning the hearings into a symbol of resistance. Their stance emphasized the deep legal tension between congressional investigatory power and individuals' First Amendment rights during a notably repressive period in American history.

The struggles attending the blacklist were played out metaphorically on the big screen in various ways. As described by film historian James Chapman, "Carl Foreman, who had refused to testify before the committee, wrote the western High Noon (1952), in which a town marshal (played, ironically, by friendly witness Gary Cooper) finds himself deserted by the good citizens of Hadleyville (read: Hollywood) when a gang of outlaws who had terrorized the town several years earlier (read: HUAC) returns." Cooper's lawman cleaned up Hadleyville, but Foreman was forced to leave for Europe to find work. Meanwhile, Kazan and Schulberg collaborated on a movie widely seen as justifying their decision to name names. On the Waterfront (1954) became one of the most honored films in Hollywood history, winning eight Academy Awards, including Oscars for Best Film, Kazan's direction, and Schulberg's screenplay. The film featured Lee J. Cobb, an actor known to have named names. Time Out Film Guide argues that On the Waterfront is "undermined" by its "embarrassing special pleading on behalf of informers."

After his release from prison, Herbert Biberman of the Hollywood Ten directed Salt of the Earth (1954). For this project, he and the newly formed Independent Productions Corporation worked in New Mexico, outside the studio system, with a group of blacklisted professionals: producer Paul Jarrico, writer Michael Wilson, and actor Will Geer. The film, which concerns a strike by Mexican-American mine workers – with an ahead-of-its-time subplot "about the growing feminist consciousness of the workers' wives" – was denounced as Communist propaganda when it was completed in 1953. Distributors boycotted it, newspapers and radio stations rejected advertisements for it, and the projectionists' union refused to run it. In 1954, only about a dozen theaters in the U.S. exhibited Salt of the Earth.

=== Break (1957–present) ===
Jules Dassin was one of the first to successfully defy the blacklist. Although he was named by Edward Dmytryk and Frank Tuttle in spring 1951, Dassin still managed to direct in December 1952 the Broadway play Two's Company with Bette Davis. In June 1956, his French-made film Rififi opened at the Fine Arts Theater in New York and stayed for 20 weeks.

A key figure in bringing an end to blacklisting was John Henry Faulk. Host of an afternoon comedy radio show, Faulk was a leftist active in the American Federation of Television and Radio Artists union. He was scrutinized by AWARE, Inc., a private firm that examined individuals for signs of "disloyalty" and Communist sympathies. Marked by AWARE as unfit, Faulk was fired by CBS Radio. Almost alone among blacklisting's victims, he decided to sue AWARE. Though his case which began in 1957 dragged through the courts for years, the suit itself was an important symbol of the building resistance to the status quo.

The initial cracks in the blacklist were evident on television, specifically at CBS. In 1957, blacklisted actor Norman Lloyd was hired by Alfred Hitchcock as an associate producer for the anthology series Alfred Hitchcock Presents, then entering its third season on the network. On November 30, 1958, a live CBS production of Wonderful Town, based on short stories written by then-Communist Ruth McKenney, appeared with the proper writing credit of blacklisted Edward Chodorov, along with his literary partner, Joseph Fields. The following year, actress Betty Hutton insisted that blacklisted composer Jerry Fielding must be hired as musical director for her new series, also on CBS.

Many of those who refused to cooperate with the HUAC hearings faced consequences that were more permanent than others. While most experienced professional isolation, there were cases that led to the end of their career in the entertainment industry. Hollywood Ten member Albert Maltz faced prison time following his testimony that landed him on the blacklist. Maltz’s career never recovered coming out of the era of McCarthyism. Writer, radio figure, and known Communist Party activist who was listed in Red Channels, Dashiell Hammett had his radio show canceled and served time for contempt of court. Books Hammett had published were no longer in print, and he ended his political affiliation ten years before his passing.

However, some individuals managed to escape the blacklist or save their careers from ending, in varying ways. Screenwriter Isobel Lennart volunteered to appear before the HUAC to avoid issues with her MGM contract and has stated that she feels guilt for cooperating with the Committee. The first big break in the Hollywood blacklist followed soon after. On January 20, 1960, director Otto Preminger publicly announced that Dalton Trumbo, one of the best known members of the Hollywood Ten, would be the screenwriter of Preminger's forthcoming film Exodus. Six and a half months later, with Exodus still to debut, The New York Times reported that Universal Pictures would give Trumbo screen credit for his writing work on Spartacus, a decision now recognized as being largely made by the film's star/producer Kirk Douglas. On October 6, Spartacus premiered – the first movie to bear Trumbo's name since he had received story credit on Emergency Wedding in 1950. In the period from 1947 to 1960, Trumbo had written or co-written approximately 17 motion pictures without credit. Exodus followed in December 1960, also bearing Trumbo's name. Trumbo regained his status through these films and continued his career in entertainment. The blacklist was clearly coming to an end, but its effects continued to reverberate into the next century.

John Henry Faulk won his lawsuit in 1962. With this court decision, the private blacklisters and those who enforced entertainment industry blacklists were put on notice that they were legally liable for the professional and financial damage they caused, which helped bring a halt to "smear" publications like Counterattack. However, a number of blacklistees, such as Adrian Scott and Lillian Hellman, remained personae non gratae for several more years. The character actor Lionel Stander could not find film work until 1965. Hollywood Ten screenwriters John Howard Lawson and Lester Cole, who did not renounce communism in later life, were never "un-blacklisted".

Some of those who named names, like Kazan and Schulberg, argued afterward that they had made an ethically proper decision. Others, like actor Lee J. Cobb and director Michael Gordon, who gave friendly testimony to HUAC after suffering on the blacklist for a time, "concede[d] with remorse that their plan was to name their way back to work." A few "informers" were haunted by the choice they made. In 1963, actor Sterling Hayden declared,

I was a rat, a stoolie, and the names I named of those close friends were blacklisted and deprived of their livelihood.

Scholars Paul Buhle and Dave Wagner state that Hayden "was widely believed to have drunk himself into a near-suicidal depression decades before his 1986 death."

Because the Hollywood blacklist was (apart from the Waldorf Statement) largely an unspoken phenomenon, it was possible subsequently to deny or revise what had happened. In a 1980 interview with journalist Robert Scheer, U.S. presidential candidate and former SAG president Ronald Reagan was asked for his recollections about the blacklist. In his view, the film industry "had responded to Communist domination of several unions and Communist efforts to take over the industry. They had 'gotten into positions where they could destroy careers, and did destroy them. There was no blacklist in Hollywood. The blacklist in Hollywood, if there was one, was provided by the Communists.'"

In the 1990s and 2000s, the Writers Guild pursued the correction of screen credits in movies of the 1950s and early 1960s to accurately reflect the contributions of blacklisted writers such as Carl Foreman and Hugo Butler. Due to guild pressure, the credits for Lawrence of Arabia (1962) on its 40th anniversary re-release in 2002 (both for theatres and DVD) were finally altered to read "Screenplay by Robert Bolt and Michael Wilson". On December 19, 2011, the guild, acting on a request for an investigation made by his dying son Christopher Trumbo, confirmed that Dalton Trumbo would get full credit for his story and screenplay for the romantic comedy Roman Holiday (1953), almost sixty years after the fact.

== Blacklisted individuals ==
=== Hollywood Nineteen ===
On September 27, 1947, the HUAC subpoenaed the following nineteen individuals in an effort to investigate "subversive" elements in the entertainment industry:

1. Alvah Bessie, screenwriter
2. Herbert Biberman, screenwriter and director
3. Lester Cole, screenwriter
4. Edward Dmytryk, director
5. Ring Lardner Jr., screenwriter
6. John Howard Lawson, screenwriter
7. Albert Maltz, screenwriter
8. Samuel Ornitz, screenwriter
9. Adrian Scott, producer and screenwriter
10. Dalton Trumbo, screenwriter
11. Bertolt Brecht, playwright and screenwriter
12. Richard Collins, screenwriter
13. Howard Koch, screenwriter
14. Gordon Kahn, screenwriter
15. Robert Rossen, screenwriter and director
16. Waldo Salt, screenwriter
17. Lewis Milestone, director
18. Irving Pichel, actor and director
19. Larry Parks, actor

The HUAC claimed these men were affiliated with the CPUSA and had injected Communist propaganda into their films. Although the claims were never substantiated, the investigators demanded the "Hollywood Nineteen" admit their political beliefs and name names of other Communists. Due to illnesses, scheduling conflicts, and exhaustion from the chaotic hearings, only the first eleven in the list were called to testify. Brecht, the one foreigner in the group, pretended to cooperate and then fled for Europe. The other ten refused to answer questions about their membership in the Screen Writers Guild or Communist Party. The HUAC charged them with contempt of Congress and they were immediately blacklisted. The ten Americans who testified were referred to as the "Unfriendly Ten" but soon were more commonly known as the "Hollywood Ten".

In 1947, belonging to the CPUSA did not yet constitute a crime, and the committee's right to investigate people's beliefs and associations was legally problematic. As their defense, the Ten relied on the First Amendment's guarantees of freedom of speech and freedom of thought (and the right to keep one's thoughts private), but the committee charged the men with contempt of Congress for refusing to answer questions. Subsequent witnesses (except Pete Seeger) tried different defense strategies.

Acknowledging the potential for punishment, the Ten resisted the HUAC's authority. They yelled at the chairman and treated the committee with indignation. Upon receiving their contempt citations, they assumed the Supreme Court would overturn the rulings, which did not turn out to be true. As a result, they were convicted of contempt and fined $1,000 each, and served prison terms ranging from six months to a year. In keeping with the harsh political atmosphere of the time, the Hollywood Ten were likely the first Americans ever imprisoned for contempt of Congress, a misdemeanor offense.

Martin Redish has suggested the First Amendment's right of free expression was wielded in these cases more to protect the powers of the Congressional accusers than to protect the rights of the accused. After seeing the ineffectiveness of the First Amendment-based defense adopted by the Hollywood Ten, later defendants opted to plead the Fifth Amendment (against self-incrimination).

Public support for the Hollywood Ten wavered, as everyday citizen-observers were never really sure what to make of them. Some of the blacklistees wrote about their experiences. John Howard Lawson, the Hollywood Ten's unofficial leader, published a book attacking the film industry for its capitulation to the HUAC. While mostly blaming the studio executives, he also defended the Ten and castigated Edward Dmytryk for being the only member to recant and cooperate with the committee.

In his 1981 autobiography, Hollywood Red, screenwriter Lester Cole affirmed that virtually all of the Hollywood Ten had joined the CPUSA at some point. Other members of the Hollywood Ten, such as Dalton Trumbo and Edward Dmytryk, publicly admitted to being Communists while testifying before the committee.

When Dmytryk wrote his memoir about the Hollywood blacklist, he denounced the Ten and defended his decision to work with the HUAC and name names. Characterizing himself as the "odd man out", he claimed to have left the CPUSA well before he was subpoenaed. He condemned the Ten's legal strategy of defying Congress, and regretted staying with the group for as long as he did.

=== Others in 1947 ===
- Hanns Eisler, composer
- Bernard Gordon, screenwriter
- Joan LaCour Scott, screenwriter
- Irving Lerner, editor and director

=== Added from January 1948 – June 1950 ===
(an asterisk after the entry indicates the person was also listed in Red Channels)

- Ben Barzman, screenwriter
- Paul Draper, actor and dancer*
- Sheridan Gibney, screenwriter
- Paul Green, playwright and screenwriter
- Lillian Hellman, playwright and screenwriter*
- Canada Lee, actor
- Paul Robeson, actor and singer
- Edwin Rolfe, poet and screenwriter
- William Sweets, radio personality*
- Richard Wright, writer

=== Red Channels list ===
(see, e.g., Schrecker [2002], p. 244; Barnouw [1990], pp. 122–124)

- Larry Adler, actor and musician
- Luther Adler, actor and director
- Stella Adler, actress and teacher
- Edith Atwater, actress
- Howard Bay, scenic designer
- Ralph Bell, actor
- Leonard Bernstein, composer and conductor
- Walter Bernstein, screenwriter
- Michael Blankfort, screenwriter ^{[c]}
- Marc Blitzstein, composer
- True Boardman, screenwriter
- Millen Brand, writer
- Oscar Brand, folk singer
- Joseph Edward Bromberg, actor
- Himan Brown, producer and director
- John Brown, actor
- Abe Burrows, playwright and lyricist
- Morris Carnovsky, actor
- Vera Caspary, writer
- Edward Chodorov, screenwriter and producer
- Jerome Chodorov, writer
- Mady Christians, actress
- Lee J. Cobb, actor
- Marc Connelly, playwright
- Aaron Copland, composer
- Norman Corwin, writer
- Howard Da Silva, actor
- Roger De Koven, actor
- Dean Dixon, conductor
- Olin Downes, music critic
- Alfred Drake, actor and singer
- Paul Draper, actor and dancer
- Howard Duff, actor
- Clifford J. Durr, attorney
- Richard Dyer-Bennet, folk singer
- José Ferrer, actor
- Louise Fitch, actress
- Martin Gabel, actor
- Arthur Gaeth, radio commentator
- William S. Gailmor, journalist and radio commentator
- John Garfield, actor
- Will Geer, actor
- Jack Gilford, actor and comedian
- Tom Glazer, folk singer
- Ruth Gordon, actress and screenwriter
- Lloyd Gough, actor
- Morton Gould, pianist and composer
- Shirley Graham, writer
- Ben Grauer, radio and TV personality
- Mitchell Grayson, radio producer and director
- Horace Grenell, conductor and music producer
- Uta Hagen, actress and teacher
- Dashiell Hammett, writer
- E. Y. "Yip" Harburg, lyricist
- Robert P. Heller, television journalist
- Lillian Hellman, playwright and screenwriter
- Nat Hiken, writer and producer
- Rose Hobart, actress
- Judy Holliday, actress and comedian
- Roderick B. Holmgren, journalist
- Lena Horne, singer and actress
- Langston Hughes, writer
- Marsha Hunt, actress
- Leo Hurwitz, director
- Charles Irving, actor
- Burl Ives, folk singer and actor
- Sam Jaffe, actor
- Leon Janney, actor
- Joe Julian, actor
- Garson Kanin, writer and director
- George Keane, actor
- Donna Keath, radio actress
- Pert Kelton, actress
- Alexander Kendrick, journalist and author
- Adelaide Klein, actress
- Felix Knight, singer and actor
- Howard Koch, screenwriter
- Tony Kraber, actor
- Millard Lampell, screenwriter
- John La Touche, lyricist
- Arthur Laurents, writer
- Gypsy Rose Lee, actress and ecdysiast
- Madeline Lee, actress^{[d]}
- Ray Lev, classical pianist
- Philip Loeb, actor
- Ella Logan, actress and singer
- Alan Lomax, folklorist and musicologist
- Avon Long, actor and singer
- Joseph Losey, director
- Peter Lyon, television writer
- Aline MacMahon, actress
- Paul Mann, director and teacher
- Margo, actress and dancer
- Myron McCormick, actor
- Paul McGrath, radio actor
- Burgess Meredith, actor
- Arthur Miller, playwright
- Henry Morgan, actor
- Zero Mostel, actor and comedian
- Jean Muir, actress
- Meg Mundy, actress
- Lyn Murray, composer and choral director
- Ben Myers, attorney
- Dorothy Parker, writer
- Arnold Perl, producer and writer
- Minerva Pious, actress
- Samson Raphaelson, screenwriter and playwright
- Bernard Reis, accountant
- Anne Revere, actress
- Kenneth Roberts, writer
- Earl Robinson, composer and lyricist
- Edward G. Robinson, actor
- William N. Robson, radio and TV writer
- Harold Rome, composer and lyricist
- Norman Rosten, writer
- Selena Royle, actress
- Coby Ruskin, TV director
- Robert St. John, journalist, broadcaster
- Hazel Scott, jazz and classical musician
- Pete Seeger, folk singer
- Lisa Sergio, radio personality
- Artie Shaw, jazz musician
- Irwin Shaw, writer
- Robert Lewis Shayon, former president of radio and TV directors' guild
- Ann Shepherd, actress
- William L. Shirer, journalist, broadcaster
- Allan Sloane, radio and TV writer
- Howard K. Smith, journalist, broadcaster
- Gale Sondergaard, actress
- Hester Sondergaard, actress
- Lionel Stander, actor
- Johannes Steele, journalist, radio commentator
- Paul Stewart, actor
- Elliott Sullivan, actor
- William Sweets, radio personality
- Helen Tamiris, choreographer
- Betty Todd, director
- Louis Untermeyer, poet
- Hilda Vaughn, actress
- J. Raymond Walsh, radio commentator
- Sam Wanamaker, actor
- Theodore Ward, playwright
- Fredi Washington, actor
- Margaret Webster, actress, director and producer
- Orson Welles, actor, writer and director
- Josh White, blues musician
- Irene Wicker, singer and actress
- Betty Winkler (Keane), actress
- Martin Wolfson, actor
- Lesley Woods, actor
- Richard Yaffe, journalist, broadcaster

=== Added after June 1950 ===
- Eddie Albert, actor
- Lew Amster, screenwriter
- Richard Attenborough, actor, director and producer
- Norma Barzman, screenwriter
- Sol Barzman, screenwriter
- Orson Bean, actor
- Albert Bein, screenwriter
- Harry Belafonte, actor and singer
- Barbara Bel Geddes, actress
- Ben Bengal, screenwriter
- Seymour Bennett, screenwriter
- Leonardo Bercovici, screenwriter
- Herschel Bernardi, actor
- John Berry, actor, screenwriter and director
- Henry Blankfort, screenwriter
- Laurie Blankfort, artist
- Roman Bohnen, actor
- Allen Boretz, screenwriter and songwriter
- Phoebe Brand, actress
- John Bright, screenwriter
- Phil Brown, actor
- Harold Buchman, screenwriter
- Sidney Buchman, screenwriter
- Luis Buñuel, director
- Val Burton, screenwriter
- Hugo Butler, screenwriter
- Alan Campbell, screenwriter
- Cliff Carpenter, actor
- Howland Chamberlain, actor
- Frances Chaney, actress
- Charlie Chaplin, actor, director and producer
- Maurice Clark, screenwriter
- Angela Clarke, actress
- Richard Collins, screenwriter
- Charles Collingwood, radio commentator
- Dorothy Comingore, actress
- George Corey, screenwriter
- Irwin Corey, actor and comedian
- Jeff Corey, actor
- Oliver Crawford, screenwriter
- John Cromwell, director
- Charles Dagget, animator^{[e]}
- Danny Dare, choreographer^{[f]}
- Jules Dassin, director
- Ossie Davis, actor
- Ruby Dee, actress
- Dolores del Río, actress
- Karen DeWolf, screenwriter
- Howard Dimsdale, writer
- Ludwig Donath, actor
- Arnaud d'Usseau, screenwriter
- Phil Eastman, cartoon writer
- Leslie Edgley, screenwriter
- Edward Eliscu, screenwriter
- Faith Elliott, animator
- Cy Endfield, screenwriter and director
- Guy Endore, screenwriter
- Francis Edward Faragoh, screenwriter
- Frances Farmer, actress
- Virginia Farmer, playwright and screenwriter
- Howard Fast, writer
- John Henry Faulk, radio personality
- Jerry Fielding, composer
- Carl Foreman, producer and screenwriter
- Anne Froelick, screenwriter
- Lester Fuller, screenwriter and director
- Jody Gilbert, actress
- Bert Gilden, screenwriter
- Lee Gold, screenwriter
- Harold Goldman, screenwriter
- Michael Gordon, director
- Jay Gorney, screenwriter
- Lee Grant, actress
- Morton Grant, screenwriter
- Anne Green, screenwriter
- Jack T. Gross, producer
- Margaret Gruen, screenwriter
- David Hilberman, animator
- Tamara Hovey, screenwriter
- John Hubley, animator
- Edward Huebsch, screenwriter
- Ian McLellan Hunter, screenwriter
- Kim Hunter, actress
- John Ireland, actor
- Daniel James, screenwriter
- Paul Jarrico, producer and screenwriter
- Gordon Kahn, screenwriter
- Victor Kilian, actor
- Sidney Kingsley, playwright
- Alexander Knox, actor
- Mickey Knox, actor
- Lester Koenig, film/record producer
- David Kogan, radio writer and director
- Charles Korvin, actor
- Hy Kraft, screenwriter
- Constance Lee, screenwriter
- Will Lee, actor and comic
- Robert Lees, screenwriter
- Carl Lerner, editor and director
- Irving Lerner, director
- Sam Levene, actor
- Lewis Leverett, actor
- Alfred Lewis Levitt, screenwriter
- Helen Slote Levitt, screenwriter
- Mitch Lindemann, screenwriter
- Norman Lloyd, actor
- Ben Maddow, screenwriter
- Arnold Manoff, screenwriter
- William Marshall, actor
- Edwin Max, actor
- John McGrew, animator
- Ruth McKenney, writer
- Paul McVey, actor
- Bill Melendez, animator
- John "Skins" Miller, actor
- Paula Miller, actress
- Josef Mischel, screenwriter
- Karen Morley, actress
- Henry Myers, screenwriter
- Mortimer Offner, screenwriter
- Alfred Palca, writer and producer
- Larry Parks, actor
- Leo Penn, actor
- George Pepper (film producer)
- Jeanette Pepper, economist
- Irving Pichel, actor and director
- Louis Pollock, screenwriter
- Abraham Polonsky, screenwriter and director
- William Pomerance, animation executive
- Vladimir Pozner, screenwriter
- Stanley Prager, director
- John Randolph, actor
- Maurice Rapf, screenwriter
- Rosaura Revueltas, actress
- Robert L. Richards, screenwriter
- Frederic I. Rinaldo, screenwriter
- Martin Ritt, actor and director
- W. L. River, screenwriter
- Marguerite Roberts, screenwriter
- David Robison, screenwriter
- Naomi Robison, actress
- Louise Rousseau, screenwriter
- Jean Rouverol (Butler), actress and writer
- Shimen Ruskin, actor
- Madeleine Ruthven, screenwriter
- Waldo Salt, screenwriter
- John Sanford, screenwriter
- Bill Scott, voice actor and producer
- Martha Scott, actress
- Robert Shayne, actor
- Joshua Shelley, actor
- Madeleine Sherwood, actress
- Reuben Ship, screenwriter
- Viola Brothers Shore, screenwriter
- Hilda Simms, actress
- George Sklar, playwright
- Art Smith, actor
- Louis Solomon, screenwriter and producer
- Ray Spencer, screenwriter
- Janet Stevenson, writer
- Philip Stevenson, writer
- Donald Ogden Stewart, screenwriter
- Arthur Strawn, screenwriter
- Bess Taffel, screenwriter
- Julius Tannenbaum, producer
- Frank Tarloff, screenwriter
- Shepard Traube, director and screenwriter
- Dorothy Tree, actress
- Paul Trivers, screenwriter
- George Tyne, actor
- Michael Uris, writer
- Peter Viertel, screenwriter
- Salka Viertel, screenwriter and actress
- Bernard Vorhaus, director
- John Weber, producer
- Richard Weil, screenwriter
- Hannah Weinstein, producer
- Haskell Wexler, cinematographer
- John Wexley, screenwriter
- Crane Whitley, actor
- Michael Wilson, screenwriter
- Nedrick Young, actor and screenwriter
- Julian Zimet, screenwriter

== See also ==
- Joseph McCarthy
