= Processional (play) =

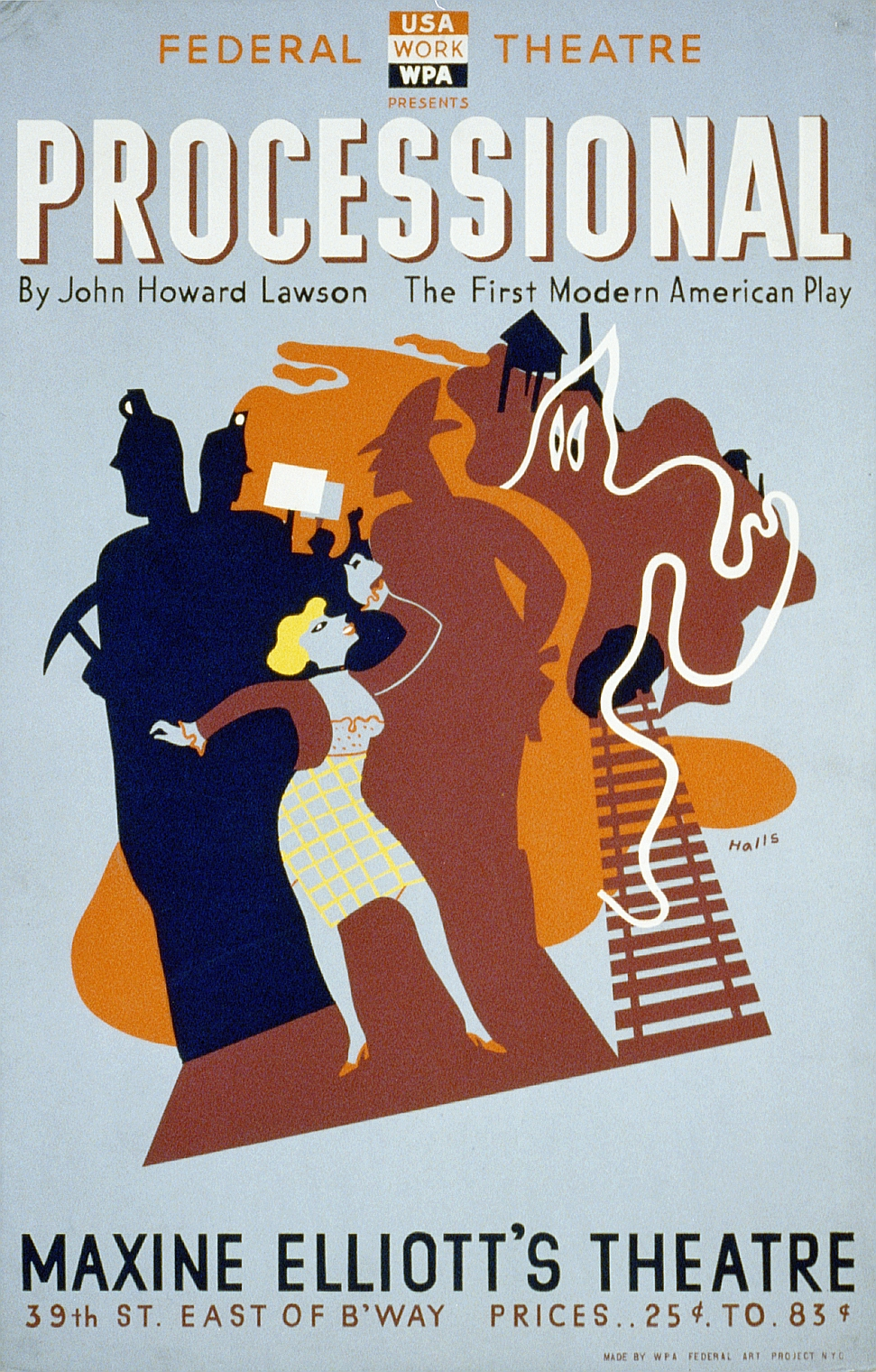
- Poster for Federal Theatre Project presentation of Processional ("The First Modern American Play") at Maxine Elliott's Theatre, 1937
- Written by: John Howard Lawson
- Original language: English
- Subject: A jazz symphony of American life
- Genre: Modernist comedy
- Setting: The outskirts of a large town in the West Virginia coal fields, 1931

Premiere
- Date premiered: January 12, 1925
- Place premiered: Garrick Theatre; New York

Processional: A Jazz Symphony of American Life (1925) is a four-act modernist comedy by the American playwright John Howard Lawson. It was first produced by the Theatre Guild at the Garrick Theatre in New York, opening on January 12, 1925 in a two-month run. Philip Moeller directed while Mordecai Gorelik designed the sets and costumes. Lee Strasberg played the minor role of First Soldier in the production; Sanford Meisner, too, played a minor part. It was revived by the Federal Theatre Project in 1937, at Maxine Elliott's Theatre.
