= Richard Yaffe =

Richard Yaffe (June 10, 1903 – October 30, 1986), was a journalist and founding editor in chief of Israel Horizons magazine. He was also a special correspondent of the Columbia Broadcasting System. In 1950 he was part of the Hollywood blacklist. He died in New York Hospital in 1986 of pneumonia.
