= Blockade (1938 film) =

1938 film by William Dieterle

- Theatrical film poster
- Directed by: William Dieterle
- Screenplay by: John Howard Lawson
- Produced by: Walter Wanger
- Starring: Madeleine Carroll; Henry Fonda; Leo Carrillo; John Halliday
- Cinematography: Rudolph Maté
- Edited by: Otho Lovering; Dorothy Spencer
- Music by: Werner Janssen
- Production company: Walter Wanger Productions
- Distributed by: United Artists
- Release date: June 16, 1938
- Running time: 85 minutes
- Country: United States
- Language: English
- Budget: $692,087
- Box office: $665,523

Blockade is a 1938 American drama film directed by William Dieterle and starring Madeleine Carroll, Henry Fonda, and Leo Carrillo.

== Plot ==
In 1936 Spain, Norma, an expatriate from the Russian Revolution, crashes her luxury car on her way to Castelmare. On the way there, Spanish farmer Marco and his friend Luis tow her car to their oxen. By nighttime, they reach the residence of her father Basil. Norma and Marco become attracted to each other as she yearns for Marco's simple farm life. Norma meets her father inside, who has joined with his old acquaintance Andre Gallinet.

Back on their farm, Marco and Luis hear guns in the background, signaling the beginning of a war. As the occupants leave the war zone, Marco urgently pleads for his neighbors to fight for their land. His neighbors follow Marco's advice and mount a defense to protect their land. Since the Nationalists were halted from advancing into Castelmare, General Vallejo decorates Marco for his bravery and gives him the rank of Lieutenant.

At a tavern, Marco notices Basil is dressed as a peasant but wearing expensive shoes. Basil leaves the tavern drunk, and Marco follows him home, where he holds Basil at gunpoint. As Marco inspects, Basil shoots at him but is killed by Marco in self-defense. Norma arrives, to which Marco learns Basil was her father. He confesses he didn't know and Marco takes Norma into custody.

Before Norma can be interrogated, the shelter is bombed during an air raid. Trapped under the debris, they remain stuck there overnight until Luis digs them out. After Norma is retrieved, she runs away until she is returned to Vallego's headquarters. Andre is brought in and persuades a reluctant Norma to return to Castelmare to deliver a message to allies.

On a train, Norma meets with journalist Edward Grant, who has been covering the war. She delivers the message at the café, which reads that a supply ship will arrive before dawn that could break the Nationalist blockade on the port of Castelmare. Edward escorts Norma around the bombed city, showing her the effects the blockade has had on local residents. Guilt-ridden, Norma confesses she was a spy to Marco, who lets her go.

While Marco follows her, Norma tries to convince her agents to reverse course and have the ship returned to Castelmare. As the opposition agents are arrested, Norma is angered by Marco's distrust of her. She explains she was trying to help, and shortly after, the supply ship is torpedoed and sinks underwater. Norma explains to Vallego that she betrayed because she has no home country and that Andre is a spy. As it turns out, Andre and Vallejo are both double agents working for the opposition.

Marco alerts Vallejo that another supply ship is heading for Castelmare. Vallejo and Andre learn the sunken ship was a decoy, and suddenly, Marco realizes Vallejo is a traitor. Before Andre tries to call off the ship, Norma grabs Andre's gun and shoots him. Vallego then holds Marco and Norma prisoner, as the ship delivers supplies to the residents. A military commandant interrogates Norma and Marco, and Vallejo is later arrested. The commandant relieves Marco of his duty, and to find peace elsewhere. Marco refuses, knowing that they can have no peace while the war continues.

== Cast ==
- Madeleine Carroll as Norma
- Henry Fonda as Marco
- Leo Carrillo as Luis
- John Halliday as Andre Gallinet
- Vladimir Sokoloff as Basil
- Robert Warwick as General Vallejo
- Reginald Denny as Edward Grant
- Peter Godfrey as Magician
- Fred Kohler as Pietro
- Carlos De Valdez as Major del Rio
- Nick Thompson as Seppo
- William B. Davidson as Commandant
- Katherine DeMille as Cabaret Girl

== Production ==
Blockade began as a project for Lewis Milestone, who attempted to adapt journalist Vincent Sheean's memoir Personal History into a film (it was later made into Foreign Correspondent in 1940). In February 1937, Walter Wanger encouraged him to collaborate with playwright Clifford Odets on a script about the Spanish Civil War. Titled The River is Blue and later Castles in the Air, their script was loosely based on The Love of Jeanne Ney (1927), which told of Spaniard loyalists in Paris deciding to return home and join the fight against fascism. Wanger hired actors from the Group Theatre to be screen-tested for several roles. Those included Luther Adler, Roman Bohnen, Morris Carnovsky, Lee J. Cobb, and Elia Kazan. However, the Production Code Administration (PCA), led by Joseph Breen, instructed Milestone and Odets to not openly identify which side of the war the film was supporting. Odets lost interest, and Wanger and Milestone disagreed about the central casting.

A year later, Wanger revived the project and hired John Howard Lawson, who was an active supporter of the Spanish Republicans and an associate with the Communist Party. He drafted a new script inspired by a real-life incident, in which the pro-Francoist faction organized a blockade which starved residents within a town. The PCA demanded rewrites to remove references to the Italian and German-backed Francoists, and Lawson's third draft was approved. Shortly after, Wanger hired William Dieterle to direct the film.

== Release ==
Upon its release, Blockade was condemned by the Catholic Church and various U.S. Catholic organizations including the Knights of Columbus within the New York City Council, led by Joseph F. Lamb, all of whom supported Francisco Franco. The Knights of Columbus characterized the film as an "excursion of the motion-picture industry into the field of Leftist propaganda." They organized protests and proceeded on a measure to have the film banned in Boston. Blockade was ultimately banned in Somerville, Massachusetts.

On the other hand, the Communist Party praised the film and accused the Knights of Columbus of stirring up controversy "even before Americans ...had had the opportunity of deciding for themselves." The Medical Bureau and North American Committee to Aid Spanish Democracy passed out circulars describing Blockade as a story of "the heroic struggle of a free people faced with the horrors of invasion," and urged those who support the film to write to United Artists.

In response, Wanger defended Blockade as a humanitarian plea against war's atrocities and that his film took no side of the Spanish Civil War. He further pleaded that Lamb "should be the very first to agree with me in the importance of its message. I think it unfair to assume that Mr. Lamb speaks for the entire membership of his organization." Despite the protests, Blockade was successful at the Loew's State Theatre and the Orpheum, both in Boston. On the other hand, Fox–West Coast Theatres refused to book the film for its first-run engagements and was widely banned abroad.

== Reception ==
=== Box office ===
Blockade was a box-office failure, largely due to various Catholic organizations who opposed the film for its anti-Francoist stance. The film had a loss of $135,672.

=== Critical reaction ===
Frank S. Nugent of The New York Times felt Blockade was not as potent in its message, and wrote: "Had he [Wanger], or any other producer, intended to fashion a pro-Loyalist propaganda picture, he could have turned out a far stronger film Blockade is, far stronger than its foes would have you believe it is." John C. Flinn of Variety called Blockade "a film with purpose, which shouldn't be held against it because the purpose is a worthy one—a plea against war ...Vehement in its message, realistic in its pictorial argument and earnest in its appeal, the picture is distinctive, different, and provocative. But it misses any claim to greatness because it pulls its punches."

Harrison's Reports called the film "strong fare. It presents its subject, that of the plight of the poor Spanish peasants, presumably the Loyalists, powerfully; but it is too depressing, too heart-rending to be classified as entertainment." Time magazine wrote: "In all justice to Producer Wanger, who at least had the nerve to approach an explosive theme. Blockade is no sensational polemic ...Glimpses of peasants fleeing from their farms, townsfolk with-pinched faces huddled beside ruined buildings or staring forlornly out to sea, make up its most effective sequences. As such, they constitute an interesting variation on the Hollywood war-picture formula but are scarcely enough to give the picture top rating, either as document or as drama."

== Bibliography ==
- Bernstein, Matthew (2000). Walter Wanger, Hollywood Independent. University of Minnesota Press. ISBN 978-0-8166-3548-1.
- Schickel, Richard (2005). Elia Kazan: A Biography. New York: HarperCollins. ISBN 0-06-019579-7.
