= The International (play) =

- Original language: English
- Written by: John Howard Lawson
- Genre: Modernist drama

Premiere
- Date: January 12, 1928
- Place: New Playwrights' Theatre, New York

The International is a play by the American playwright John Howard Lawson. It was first produced by the New Playwrights' Theatre in New York, opening on January 12 1928. Lawson directed this production, while John Dos Passos designed the sets, Edward A. Ziman composed its music, Don Oscar Becque choreographed the dances, and Helen Johnson designed the costumes.

== Characters ==
- Simeon Silas Fitch
- Edward Elliott Spunk
- Ethel
- David Fitch
- T. Jerome Henley
- Karneski
- Alise
- Rubeloff (Soviet Commissar)
- The Living Buddha of Lhasa
- Tim
- Madam Miau
- Gussie
- General Fitzmaurice (of the British Army)
- Monsieur Fouchard (of the French Ministry)
- Benjamin Krumb
- Marines
- Native Soldiers
- Gendarmes
- Workmen

== Sources ==
- Lawson, John Howard. 1927. The International. New York: The Macaulay Company.
