= Madaline Lee =

American actress

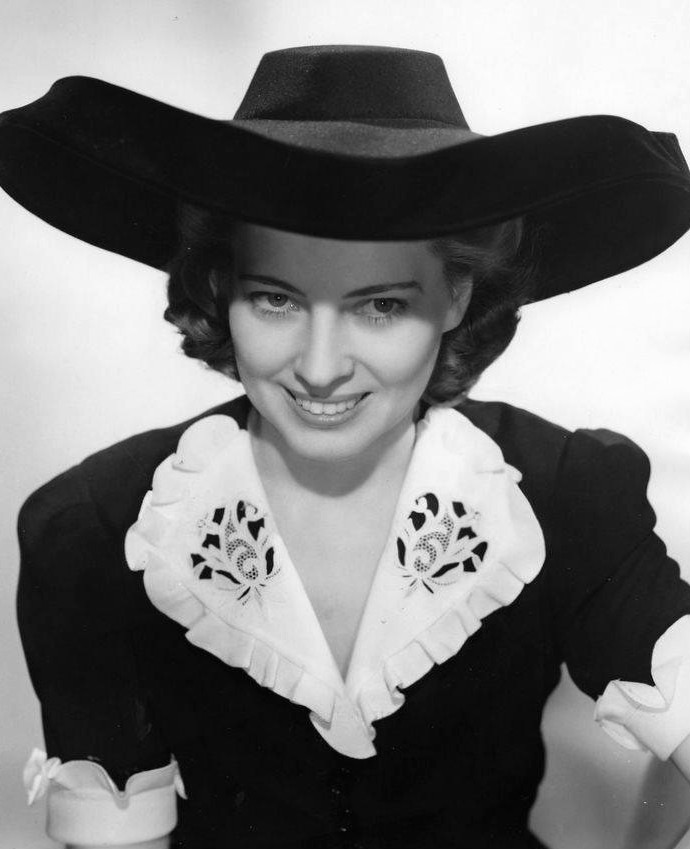
- Lee in 1942
- Born: October 28, 1902; Texas, United States
- Died: January 10, 1974 (aged 71)
- Occupation: Radio actress

Madaline Lee (October 28, 1902 – January 10, 1974) was a mid 20th century American actress, best known for her role as secretary Genevieve Blue on the Amos 'n' Andy radio program, and for her peripheral involvement in a blacklisting scandal in the 1940s.

Madaline Basford was born on October 28, 1902 in Texas.

She died at The Ravenswood and was buried in Forest Lawn Memorial Park.
