= Mordecai Gorelik =

American dramatist

Mordecai (Max) Gorelik (August 25, 1899 – March 7, 1990) was an American theatrical designer, producer and director.

== Life and work ==
Born August 25, 1899, in Shchedrin near Minsk, Russia, Mordecai (Max) Gorelik immigrated with his family to the United States in 1905 to escape the pogroms that killed most of his family. After graduating from the Pratt Institute of Fine Arts in Brooklyn in 1920, he worked for a time with Robert Edmond Jones, the pioneer American set designer who became his mentor.

Gorelik rendered in a wide variety of media and styles working with many directors and designers of the 1920s and 1930s, including Robert Edmond Jones, Lee Strasberg, Elia Kazan, Arthur Miller, Norman Bel Geddes, Lee Simonson, Jo Mielziner, Oliver Messel, Aleksandr Golovin, Henri Matisse, André Derain, and Cleon Throckmorton. He worked for companies include the Provincetown Players, the Theatre Guild on Broadway, the Group Theatre New York, and the Actors Laboratory Theater in Hollywood. In keeping with his love of experimental theatre, he was involved with avant-garde companies such as the New Playwrights Theatre, the Theatre Collective, the Theatre of Action, and the Theatre Union.

His first encounter with Bertolt Brecht in 1935 deeply influenced both his theories and designs. He became an advocate for the Epic theatre developed by Brecht and director Erwin Piscator, and he pioneered the deliberate employment of metaphor in design. A decade later, he served as a designer and director for the Biarritz American University in France where he began teaching a seminar known as "The Scenic Imagination." It won national recognition as an original, inspiring, and incisive approach to the purely creative side of stage production in script, direction, acting, and design. This study was in unique contrast to the vocational method known as stagecraft, taught everywhere else. Four years later, he also acted as an Expert Consultant in Theater for the American Military Government in Germany. His command of French and German languages enabled him to network with amateur and professional theatres around the globe.

As a leading American expert on the modern stage form, his reputation was based in part on his record as a stage and film designer and in part on the years of research he carried out, abroad, under the John Simon Guggenheim Memorial Foundation Fellowship (1936–37).

In 1949-50, Gorelik worked with the National Theatre Conference and the Rockefeller Foundation Grant (1949–51) to produce Europe Onstage.

He aspired to provide a precise knowledge of post-war problems with theatres across Western Europe. Because he spoke French and German fluently, he was able to examine many layers of people working in theatres across different cultures. He believed the social and political health of a nation could be measured by the way it treated its artists.

A Fulbright Grant he received in 1967 enabled him to examine Australian theatre. He was also very concerned with developing theatre within university environments.

Gorelik's first book, New Theatres for Old (1940), became a classic textbook used in scores of American universities. He also wrote numerous articles and reviews for major magazines and newspapers.

On Broadway, Max designed forty sets. His career began with John Howard Lawson's vaudevillian critique of Americana, Processional, and ended in 1960 with A Distant Bell. He was also the translator and adapter of The Firebugs (1963), by Swiss playwright Max Frisch. His film designs include L'Ennemi Publique No. 1 and None But the Lonely Heart.

Gorelik was also an instructor-designer for the School of Theatre in New York City and was on the faculty of a number of institutons including the American Academy of Dramatic Arts and the New School for Social Research. Upon his retirement he continued to teach, design, direct, and focused primarily on his playwriting.

He received an Honorary Doctorate of Humane Letters from Southern Illinois University among other awards.

According to Anne Fletcher, "When the field was in its infancy, he influenced stage design, helped define the designer's role in the production process, and challenged the American stage in theory and practice.”

Gorelik married Frances Strauss in 1936. They had two children: a son, Eugene Gorelik, and a daughter, Linda Gorelik. Frances Gorelik died on June 5, 1966. Loraine Kabler became his second wife in 1972. He died of cancer on March 7, 1990, in Sarasota, Florida.
