= Janet Stevenson =

American writer and social activist (1913–2009)

Janet Marshall Stevenson
- Born: Janet Atlantis Marshall; February 4, 1913; Chicago, Illinois
- Died: June 9, 2009 (aged 96); Warrenton, Oregon
- Education: Bryn Mawr College; Yale University
- Occupations: Novelist; playwright; social activist; biographer; professor; journalist; politician
- Spouse(s): Philip Stevenson; Benson Rotstein
- Children: Joseph Stevenson, Edward Stevenson
- Writing career
- Pen name: Janet Marshall, Janet Lewis, Clare Thorne, Allison Thorne, Jane(t) Holmes, Jane Marsh

Janet Marshall Stevenson (February 4, 1913 – June 9, 2009) was an American writer, teacher and social activist who wrote in the areas of civil rights, the women's movement, the peace movement, the environment and the arts. She published works in multiple fiction and nonfiction genres, and was recipient of several awards. She co-authored the successful 1943 Broadway play, Counterattack, which was adapted for the screen. She wrote a biography of California Attorney General Robert W. Kenny, who had defended the Hollywood Ten before the House Un-American Activities Committee. She and her husband Philip Stevenson were placed on the Hollywood blacklist for their political beliefs and associations. She spent the latter decades of her life in Oregon where she became active in local politics.

== Early life and education ==
Janet Atlantis Marshall was born on February 4, 1913, in Chicago, Illinois, to John Carter, an investment banker, and Atlantis Octavia (née McClendon) Marshall.

Janet graduated from Bryn Mawr College in 1933 and received an MFA in theater arts from Yale University in 1937. She married playwright and screenwriter Philip Edward Stevenson in New York City in 1939. They met while working for a summer stock theatre in Surry, Maine.

== Career ==
The Stevensons collaborated on several plays, including Declaration and Counterattack. The latter, based on the Soviet play Pobyeda by Ilya Vershinin and Mikhail Ruderman, ran on Broadway from February to April 1943. It was then turned into a 1945 motion picture of the same name, for which she received a writing co-credit.

Besides writing for stage and screen, Stevenson also lectured in drama at the University of Southern California from 1951 to 1953, but was fired for her alleged ties to the Communist Party. As a result of the blacklist, she struggled to find work. She wrote under the pseudonym Janice Stevens on The Man from Cairo (1953), and was an uncredited co-writer of The Law vs. Billy the Kid (1954).

Stevenson was assistant professor of English at Grambling College in Louisiana from 1966 to 1967, and was a lecturer at Portland State University in 1968. She served as cultural arts editor of the Chicago Weekly while temporarily living in Chicago in the 1970s. She published articles in American Heritage and the Atlantic Monthly among other magazines. Her literary agent was Barthold Fles, who handled many notable 20th century artists.

== Later life in Oregon ==
Janet and Philip Stevenson divorced in 1964, and Philip died while traveling in the Soviet Union in 1965. That same year, Janet moved to Astoria, Oregon. She soon settled in Clatsop County, Oregon and made it her home until her death in 2009. She resided at various times in Walluski, Hammond and Warrenton, and served two terms as the mayor of Hammond, beginning in 1986. She also was president of the Oregon Women's Political Caucus for many years and helped found the North Coast chapter of the organization.

In 1965, Stevenson married Benson Rotstein. In 1970, his contract was not renewed by the Astoria School Board because of his involvement in the peace movement and his use of controversial materials in his psychology classes. He appealed to the American Association of University Professors, but their decision was still pending when he died later in 1970 in a boating accident on the Columbia River Bar.

In her remaining years, Stevenson wrote in a variety of genres: journalistic pieces, travel, novels, history and biography for young adults, and a full-length political biography of Robert Kenny. Her last published book, The Slope, is based on episodes from the life of Bethenia Angelina Owens-Adair, the first woman doctor in Oregon. Stevenson sought to "rescue Bethenia from obscurity". The Slope was cited in Portland State University's "Walk of the Heroines" celebration.

Stevenson died in Warrenton on June 6, 2009. Her obituary described her as "a lifelong campaigner for human rights, social justice and peace and a staunch advocate of equal rights for women."

Stevenson's papers included the manuscript for a book, The Last Town in Oregon, about her years as mayor of Hammond. It was not to be published until after her death.

== Awards and honors ==
In 1938, Janet Stevenson won a John Golden Fellowship in playwriting; her fellow recipient that year was Tennessee Williams. She won the National Arts of the Theatre Award for "Weep No More" in 1953. She received the C.E.S. Wood Distinguished Writer Award from the Oregon Book Awards in 1990. In 1994, she was honored as an Oregon Woman of Achievement. In 2005, the Oregon Cultural Heritage Commission added Stevenson's novel Departure to its list of "100 books from the years 1800 to 2000 that exemplify the best of Oregon’s rich literary heritage." This was part of an exhibition celebrating the centennial of the Oregon State Library. Her name is included in Portland State University's Walk of the Heroines.

== Works ==
=== Novels ===
- Weep No More: A Novel (1957) - adapted from her 1953 play
- The Ardent Years: A Novel (1960)
- Sisters and Brothers: A Novel (1966)
- Departure: A Novel (1985) [1985] (1997)
- The Slope (2009)

=== Juvenile biography ===
- Painting America's Wildlife: John James Audubon (1961)
- Marian Anderson: Singing to the World (1963)
- Pioneers in Freedom: Adventures in Courage (1969)
- Spokesman for Freedom: The Life of Archibald Grimke (1969)

=== Travel ===
- Woman Aboard [1969], (1981)

=== Juvenile history ===
- Soldiers in the Civil Rights War: Adventures in Courage (1971)
- The Montgomery Bus Boycott, December, 1955: American Blacks Demand an End to Segregation (1971)
- Women's Rights (1972)
- The School Segregation Cases (Brown v. Board of Education of Topeka and Others): The United States Supreme Court Rules on Racially Separate Public Education (1973)

=== Drama ===
- Declaration with Philip Stevenson (1940)
- Counterattack with Philip Stevenson (1943)
  - Counter-Attack (screenplay) (1945)
- The Man from Cairo (screenplay) (1953)
- Weep No More (1953)
- The Third President (a rewrite of Declaration) (1976)

=== Biography ===
- The Undiminished Man: A Political Biography of Robert Walker Kenny (1980)
