= William S. Gailmor =

American physician

William S. Gailmor (28 April 1910 – 14 November 1970) was a medical writer and lecturer.

== Biography ==
Gailmor was born in Passaic, New Jersey in 1910. He was the brother of Englewood Rabbi Israel Margolies. He worked as a radio news commentator and was listed as a Communist in Red Channels. In 1945, his contract with ABC Network was not renewed. It was unclear whether this was because of the expiration of his contract or because of negative publicity after he was accused of Communist sympathies by the House Un-American Activities Committee.
