= Philip Stevenson =

American novelist

Philip Stevenson was an American novelist and screenwriter. He married Janet Stevenson.

== Career ==
Stevenson was "a socially conscious novelist and playwright who was an active participant in Santa Fe, New Mexico's art colony. His Sure Fire: Episodes in the Life of Billy the Kid, written for the 1931 Fiesta, was long remembered. Like many others in the 1930s, Stevenson was attracted to Communism as a solution to the devastating economic problems of that era. After leaving Santa Fe about 1939, he wrote screenplays in Hollywood and continued to write plays and novels, including a trilogy of novels published under the pseudonym, Lars Lawrence. He died in 1965 while touring the Soviet Union."

He purchased a home in Santa Fe in 1930.

His home in Santa Fe, at 408 Delgado Street, is listed on the National Register of Historic Places as a contributing building in the Camino del Monte Sol Historic District.
