= Julius the Cat =

Character from Alice Comedies and Laugh-O-Gram shorts

Julius
- Alice Comedies character
- Julius as he appears in the 1925 film Alice Gets Stung
- First appearance: Little Red Riding Hood (July 29, 1922)
- Created by: Walt Disney; Ub Iwerks

In-universe information
- Aliases: Mike, Peter the Puss
- Species: Cat
- Gender: Male
- Children: Oscar the Cat (adopted)

Julius the Cat is a fictional anthropomorphic cat created in 1922 by Walt Disney. He first appeared in Disney's Laugh-O-Gram comedies, making him the predecessor of Oswald the Lucky Rabbit and Mickey Mouse. Julius is an anthropomorphic cat, appearing intentionally similar to Felix the Cat. Later appearing in Disney's Alice Comedies, he gradually became the focus of the series to the point Disney abandoned live action for pure animation on subsequent projects. All shorts with Julius are in the public domain, as their copyrights were either not renewed in time or never registered.

Julius was the first of Disney's animated protagonists to battle Pete, their oldest continuing character.

The two "Julius Katz" stores on Buena Vista Street in Disney California Adventure are named in his honor.

== History ==
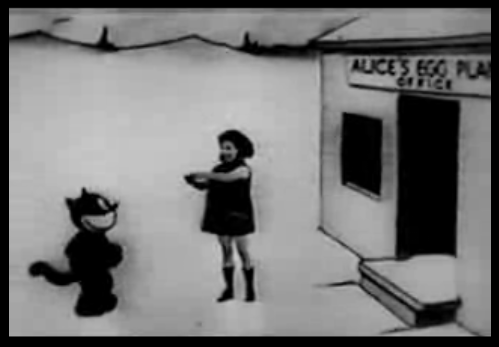
Julius and Alice (Anne Shirley) in a scene from Alice's Egg Plant (1925)

The character first appeared (nameless) in eight of the ten animated shorts created by Disney's first studio effort, Laugh-O-Gram Studio, the last of these being the pilot of the Alice Comedies, Alice's Wonderland. After a trial run as "Mike" (in Alice the Peacemaker), he would receive his permanent name of Julius in Alice's Egg Plant, making him Walt Disney's first named animated character. The primary motivation for the creation of the character was that Charles Mintz wanted to have the greatest possible visual gags in the series. Since the young Alice, first played by Virginia Davis, then only seven years old, could not be relied on for the comic role, she needed a partner, and Julius the Cat filled that role. Throughout the course of the Alice series, the animated Julius was increasingly made the central focus, over the live action Alice.

In one of his first appearances, Alice's Fishy Story, Julius' tail demonstrates its great versatility, a recurring characteristic in the series. Walt repeatedly played on the mythology of cats having nine lives. In the short film Alice the Peacemaker, he is partnered with a mouse named Ike (a forerunner to Mickey Mouse). This cat/mouse pairing was one of many famous animated duos from Krazy Kat (and Ignatz) through Tom and Jerry and Itchy and Scratchy. Julius was the first of Disney's animated characters to be antagonized by Pete, beginning in Alice Solves the Puzzle. He would later box him in Alice Picks the Champ.

== Character ==
Julius was bold, resourceful and ingenious, playing the role of the hero, frequently rescuing damsel-in-distress Alice. He often used his prehensile tail to his advantage, as a crane, unicycle, ladder, or other useful tool. Ub Iwerks' unique animation style resulted in smooth, fluid movement.

== Similarity to Felix ==
In the early days of animation, Felix the Cat, who was created in 1919 by Otto Messmer for Pat Sullivan's studio, was the template for a successful animated character. Like Felix, Julius would pace and detach his tail. When he was in a quandary, visible question marks would form over his head. The New York Times went so far as to call Julius a "blatant clone... from the rubber-hose-and-circle design to the detachable body parts."

As Rudolf Ising told animator Frank Thomas in an interview, Julius' similarities to Felix were a result of Charles Mintz urging Disney to "... make their characters more like Felix." Mintz and his wife Margaret Winkler were also distributing the Felix the Cat cartoons and were engaged in heated contract re-negiations and disputes with Sullivan at the time. Walt Disney was hesitant to mimic Felix since he didn't like imitating others, but since he was young and newcomer to the industry he reluctantly obliged. Sullivan was reportedly furious with Disney's plagiarism, and ultimately decided to end his relationship with Winkler Pitures at the end of 1925.

== Legacy ==
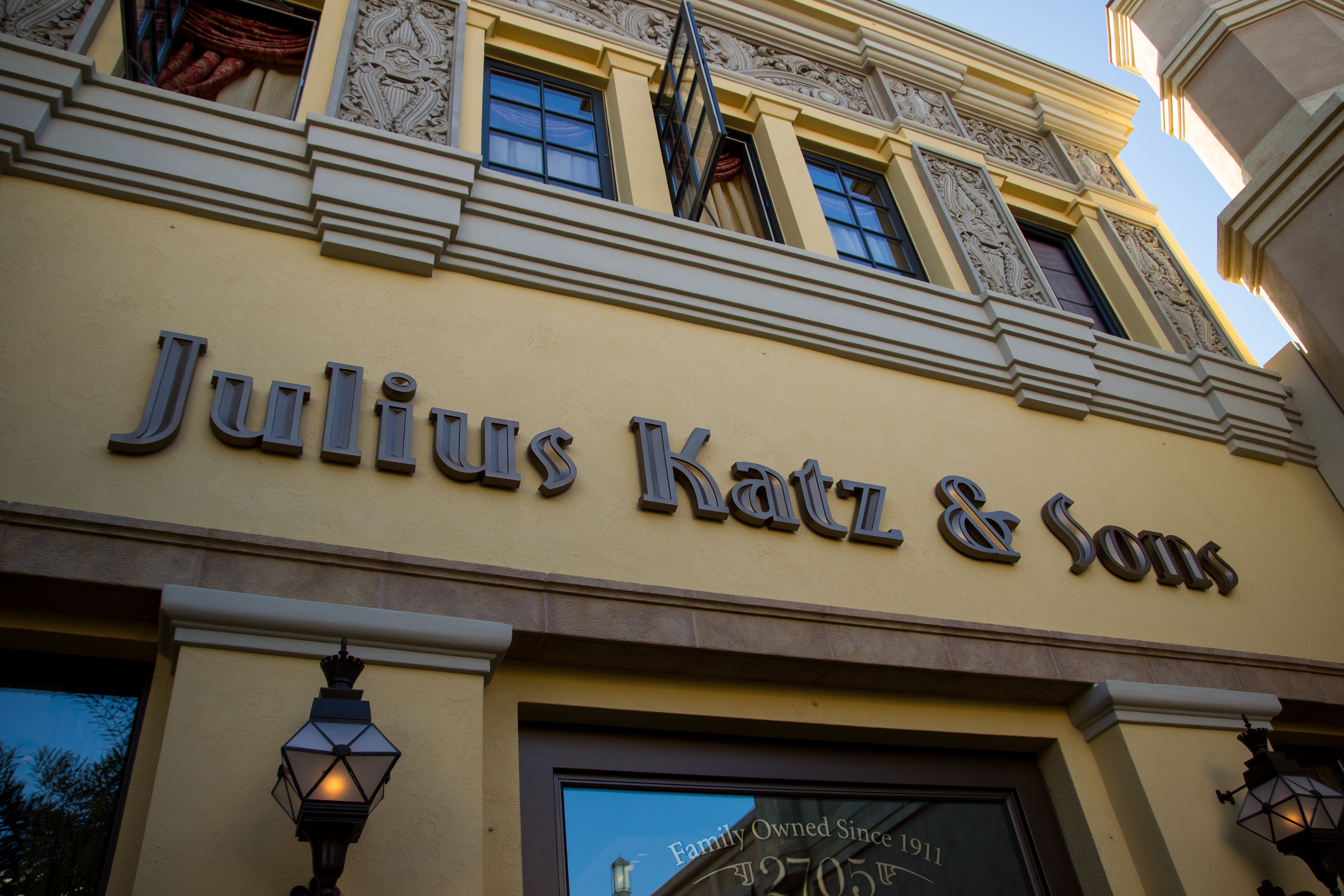
Julius Katz & Sons store at Disney's California Adventure

Many of the individual Alice Comedies films have been re-released, in packages like Disney Rarities: Celebrated Shorts: 1920s–1960s and Walt Disney Treasures: The Adventures of Oswald the Lucky Rabbit. The Mickey Mouse cartoon Runaway Brain also features a character who, though visually modeled after Pete, is named Julius.

Disney California Adventure's Julius Katz Shoe & Watch Repair and Julius Katz & Sons Appliance Repair stores on Buena Vista Street are named after Julius.

== Filmography ==
Jack the Giant Killer

The Julius character appeared in 49 of the 57 films of the Alice Comedies series.

=== 1922 ===
- Little Red Riding Hood (anonymous appearance)
- The Four Musicians of Bremen
- Jack and the Beanstalk
- Jack the Giant Killer
- Goldie Locks and the Three Bears
- Puss in Boots
- Cinderella

Alice's Wonderland

=== 1923 ===
- Jack and the Beanstalk
- Alice's Wonderland (anonymous appearance; work unfinished at studio bankruptcy)

=== 1924 ===
- Alice's Day at Sea
- Alice's Spooky Adventure
- Alice's Fishy Story
- Alice the Peacemaker (named Mike; name not used again)
- Alice Hunting in Africa
- Alice and the Three Bears
- Alice the Piper

=== 1925 ===
- Alice Cans the Cannibals
- Alice the Toreador
- Alice Gets Stung
- Alice Solves the Puzzle (first appearance of Pete)
- Alice's Egg Plant (named Julius)
- Alice Loses Out
- Alice Wins the Derby
- Alice Picks the Champ
- Alice's Tin Pony
- Alice Chops the Suey
- Alice the Jail Bird
- Alice Plays Cupid
- Alice in the Jungle

=== 1926 ===
- Alice on the Farm
- Alice's Balloon Race
- Alice's Orphan
- Alice's Little Parade
- Alice's Mysterious Mystery
- Alice Charms the Fish
- Alice's Monkey Business
- Alice in the Wooly West
- Alice the Fire Fighter
- Alice Cuts the Ice
- Alice Helps the Romance
- Alice's Spanish Guitar
- Alice's Brown Derby
- Alice the LumberJack

=== 1927 ===
- Alice the Golf Bug
- Alice Foils the Pirates
- Alice at the Carnival
- Alice at the Rodeo
- Alice the Collegiate
- Alice's Auto Race
- Alice's Circus Daze
- Alice's Knaughty Knight
- Alice's Three Bad Eggs
- Alice's Channel Swim
- Alice in the Klondike
- Alice's Medicine Show
- Alice the Whaler
- Alice the Beach Nut

== See also ==
- Animation in the United States during the silent era
- Golden age of American animation
- Epic Mickey
- Figaro, the small tuxedo cat that first appears in Disney's Pinocchio (1940)
