= Alice's Day at Sea =

1924 film by Walt Disney

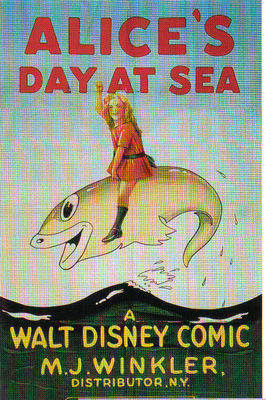
- Theatrical release poster
- Directed by: Walt Disney
- Produced by: Margaret J. Winkler
- Starring: Virginia Davis; Spec O'Donnell
- Animation by: Walt Disney
- Backgrounds by: Walt Disney
- Color process: Black and white
- Production company: Winkler Pictures
- Distributed by: Winkler Pictures
- Release date: March 1, 1924
- Running time: 11:20
- Country: United States
- Language: Silent

Alice's Day at Sea is a 1924 silent live-action animated comedy short film directed by Walt Disney. It is the first film in Winkler Pictures' Alice Comedies series. It is notable as the first film to be animated and produced by the Walt Disney Studio. Alice's Day at Sea was delivered to Winkler Pictures on December 26, 1923 and released in theaters on March 1, 1924.

== Plot ==
The full short film.

On a bright, sunny morning, Alice and her pet dog go to the beach. They meet a sailor, and Alice asks if he ever shipwrecked. He tells her a story of his ship being attacked by a giant octopus. Excited by the story, Alice wishes that she were a sailor. She and her dog sit in a small boat, and Alice falls asleep.

In her dream, Alice's ship is caught up in a violent storm, and sinks to the bottom of the sea. She exits the ship and stands on the ocean floor, observing a group of fish playing music and dancing. Next, she sees Julius the Cat with a fish tail, leading three kitten-fish on a walk. She also sees other animals transformed into fish, including a cow and a "sea-lion". Meanwhile, an octopus emerges from his undersea cave, kills a fish, and eats it. Alice is laughing at their finny frolics, but stops when a gigantic fish comes after her, with the intention of eating her. She swims away, and then decides to hop into an undersea taxicab and drive away. The fish catches up, and swallows both Alice and the car. Then it eats a narwhal with a sharp tusk. Alice fights back from the inside, causing so much damage that the fish falls to the floor in a faint. Emerging from its mouth, the narwhal and the car are bandaged and on crutches, but Alice is unharmed. The fish comes after her again, and she hides behind a rock — which turns out to be an octopus. The octopus grabs her with its tentacles... which turns out to be a fishnet that Alice is tangled up with as her dream ends. The sailor helps to extricate Alice from the net, and they both laugh as she tells him about her funny dream.

== Theatrical poster ==
According to the Guinness Book of World Records, the poster for this film was sold for $36,534 (£23,100 in the UK) at Christie's auction, the most valuable cartoon poster of all time up until then. Since the publication of that list, the poster for The Mad Doctor (1933), starring Mickey Mouse, has sold for $138,000 at Heritage Auctions (March 2006).
