= 1924 in animation =

Events in 1924 in animation.

== Films released ==
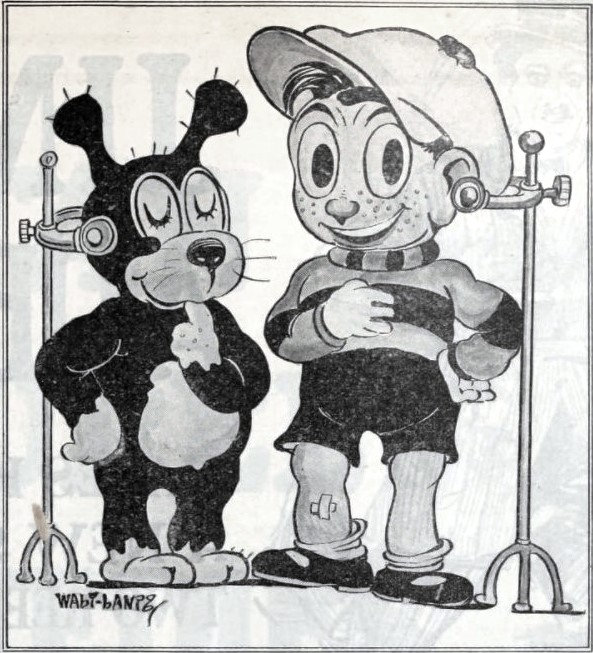
Drawing of Dinky Doodle and his dog Weakheart

- 1 January – Felix Out of Luck (United States)
- 15 January – Felix Loses Out (United States)
- 1 February:
  - Colonel Heeza Liar's Mysterious Case (United States)
  - Felix 'Hyps' the Hippo (United States)
- 15 February – Felix Crosses the Crooks (United States)
- 29 February – Felix Tries to Rest (United States)
- 1 March:
  - Alice's Day at Sea (United States)
  - Colonel Heeza Liar's Ancestor (United States)
- 15 March – Felix Doubles for Darwin (United States)
- 1 April:
  - Alice's Spooky Adventure (United States)
  - Colonel Heeza Liar's Knighthood (United States)
  - Felix Finds Out (United States)
- 11 April – Felix Cashes In (United States)
- 21 April – Felix Fairy Tales (United States)
- 1 May:
  - Alice's Wild West Show (United States)
  - Colonel Heeza Liar, Sky Pilot (United States)
  - Felix Pinches the Pole (United States)
- 15 May – Felix Puts it Over (United States)
- 1 June:
  - Alice's Fishy Story (United States)
  - Colonel Heeza Liar, Daredevil (United States)
  - A Friend in Need (United States)
- 15 June:
  - Felix Baffled by Banjos (United States)
  - Felix Finds 'Em Fickle (United States)
- 1 July:
  - Alice and the Dog Catcher (United States)
  - Colonel Heeza Liar's Horseplay (United States)
  - Felix All Balled Up (United States)
- 15 July – Felix Brings Home the Bacon (United States)
- 1 August:
  - Alice the Peacemaker (United States)
  - Colonel Heeza Liar, Cave Man (United States)
  - Felix Goes West (United States)
- 17 August – Felix Minds His Business (United States)
- 1 September:
  - Colonel Heeza Liar, Bull Thrower (United States)
  - Felix Grabs His Grub (United States)
- 1 October – Colonel Heeza Liar The Lyin' Tamer (United States)
- 29 October – The Cat and the Magnet (United States)
- 1 November:
  - Alice Gets in Dutch (United States)
  - Colonel Heeza Liar's Romance (United States)
- 15 November – Alice Hunting in Africa (United States)
- 1 December:
  - Alice and the Three Bears (United States)
  - Colonel Heeza Liar, Nature Faker (United States)
  - Felix Goes Hungry (United States)
- 3 December – She's In Again (United States)
- 15 December:
  - Alice the Piper (United States)
  - Felix Finishes First (United States)

== Events ==
=== Specific date unknown ===
The first pornographic cartoon The Virgin with the Hot Pants is screened in private parties.

== Births ==
=== January ===
- January 8: Ron Moody, British actor, singer and composer (voice of Badger and Toad in The Animals of Farthing Wood, Noah the polar bear, Rocco the gorilla, Reg the mandrill, Squadron Leader the vulture in Noah's Island), (d. 2015).
- January 14: Carole Cook, American actress (voice of Pearl Gesner in Home on the Range), (d. 2023).
- January 16: Allen Swift, American voice actor (voice of Simon Bar Sinister and Riff-Raff in Underdog, third voice of Mighty Mouse), (d. 2010).

=== February ===
- February 2: Johnny Hawksworth, British musician and composer (wrote the theme song for Roobarb), (d. 2009).
- February 10: Max Ferguson, Canadian radio personality and actor (voice of Hulk in The Marvel Super Heroes), (d. 2013).

=== March ===
- March 1: Ted C. Bemiller, American animation checker, camera operator (Crusader Rabbit, Hanna-Barbera, The Beatles, MGM Animation/Visual Arts, Filmation, Who Framed Roger Rabbit, The Simpsons, Looney Tunes), cinematographer (Fritz the Cat) and production manager (Garfield and Friends), (d. 2003).
- March 6: C. Lindsay Workman, American actor (voice of Garfield's Grandfather in Garfield on the Town, Old Man in Garfield's Halloween Adventure, God in Garfield: His 9 Lives, Professor O'Felix in Garfield's Babes and Bullets, Mr. Blossom in The Wish That Changed Christmas), (d. 2012).
- March 9: Tim Davis, American actor (voice of Adolescent Thumper and Flower in Bambi). (d. 1982).
- March 20: Philip Abbott, American actor (voice of Nick Fury in Iron Man and Spider-Man), (d. 1998).
- March 22: Lionel Wilson, American voice actor (voiced all characters in Tom Terrific, Vincent van Gopher and Possible Possum in Deputy Dawg, Eustace Bagge in Courage the Cowardly Dog), (d. 2003).
- March 29:
  - Ginger Dinning, American singer (sang "Blame It on the Samba" in Melody Time), (d. 2013).
  - Jean Dinning, American singer (sang "Blame It on the Samba" in Melody Time), (d. 2011).
  - Jackie Vernon, American comedian (voice of the title character in Frosty the Snowman), (d. 1987).

=== April ===
- April 3: Peter Hawkins, British actor (voice of Captain Pugwash, voices in Noah and Nelly in... SkylArk, narrator in SuperTed, Dennis in Penny Crayon, Comte de Rochefort in John Halas's The Three Musketeers, various characters in The Tomfoolery Show, The Perishers and Jimbo and the Jet-Set), (d. 2006).
- April 8: Frédéric Back, Canadian animator and film director (Crac, The Man Who Planted Trees), (d. 2013).
- April 16: Henry Mancini, American composer and conductor (The Pink Panther Theme, The Great Mouse Detective, Tom and Jerry: The Movie), (d. 1994).
- April 28: Blossom Dearie, American jazz singer and pianist (Schoolhouse Rock!), (d. 2009).

=== May ===
- May 12: Hansford Rowe, American actor (voice of the Thunderer in Spider-Man: The Animated Series), (d. 2017).

=== June ===
- June 2 : Wally Burr, American voice actor (voice of Atom in The All-New Super Friends Hour), and voice director (The Transformers, G.I. Joe: A Real American Hero, Jem, Inspector Gadget, Spider-Man), (d. 2017).
- June 4: Dennis Weaver, American actor and former president of the Screen Actors Guild (voice of Dusty and Josh in Captain Planet and the Planeteers, Abner Dixon in Home on the Range, Buck McCoy in The Simpsons episode "The Lastest Gun in the West"), (d. 2006).
- June 8: Sheldon Allman, American-Canadian actor (voice of Big H in CB Bears), singer, and songwriter (theme from George of the Jungle), (d. 2002).
- June 13: Lee Millar, American actor (voice of Jim Dear and the Dog Catcher in Lady and the Tramp), (d. 1980).
- June 20: Billie Lou Watt, American actress and writer (voice of the title characters in Astro Boy and Kimba the White Lion, Jimmy Sparks in Gigantor, Chris Peeper, Gizmo and other various characters in Superbook, Ma Bagge and McPhearson Phantom in Courage the Cowardly Dog), (d. 2001).

=== July ===
- July 1: Florence Stanley, American actress (voice of Mrs. Packard in Atlantis: The Lost Empire and Atlantis: Milo's Return, Waitress in A Goofy Movie), (d. 2003).
- July 4: Eva Marie Saint, American actress (voice of Katara in The Legend of Korra), (d. 2026).
- July 19: Arthur Rankin Jr., American film director and producer (Rankin/Bass), (d. 2014).
- July 20: Bill "Tex" Henson, American animator (Walt Disney Company, Famous Studios, Jay Ward), (d. 2003).
- July 21: Don Knotts, American actor (portrayed and voiced Henry Limpet in The Incredible Mr. Limpet, voice of T.W. Turtle in Cats Don't Dance, Mayor Turkey Lurkey in Chicken Little, himself in the Johnny Bravo episodes "Johnny Bravo Goes to Hollywood" and "Johnny Makeover" and The New Scooby-Doo Movies), (d. 2006).
- July 29: Lloyd Bochner, Canadian actor (voice of Hamilton Hill in Batman: The Animated Series and The New Batman Adventures), (d. 2005).

=== August ===
- August 5: Billie Hayes, American actress (voice of Orgoch in The Black Cauldron, Mother Mae-Eye in Teen Titans and Teen Titans Go!, Mrs. Neederladner in Transformers: Rescue Bots, Granny Applecheeks in The Grim Adventures of Billy & Mandy episode "Puddle Jumping", Crazy Edie in the TaleSpin episode "The Sound and the Furry"), (d. 2021).
- August 8: Gene Deitch, American comics artist, animator and film director (Munro, Tom Terrific, Nudnik, Popeye, Tom and Jerry), (d. 2020).
- August 13: Meta Velander, Swedish actress (voice of Elsa in Pettson och Findus – Kattonauten, Swedish dub voice of Mrs. Potts in Beauty and the Beast, Beauty and the Beast: The Enchanted Christmas and Belle's Magical World, Madame Medusa in The Rescuers, Amelia Gabble in The Aristocats, Orddu in The Black Cauldron, The Mouse Queen in The Great Mouse Detective, Mrs. Hogenson in The Incredibles), (d. 2025).
- August 22: Peter Foldes, Hungarian-British animator and director (A Short Vision, Hunger), (d. 1977).
- August 27: Paolo Piffarerio, Italian comics artist and animator (La Lunga Calza Verde) and film producer (Gamma Film), (d. 2015).
- August 31: Buddy Hackett, American actor and comedian (voice of Pardon-Me-Pete in Jack Frost, Scuttle in The Little Mermaid), (d. 2003).

=== September ===
- September 4: Vladimir Danilevich, Russian film director (Vaniusha The Newcomer), (d. 2001).
- September 5: Frank Armitage, Australian-American painter and muralist (Walt Disney Animation Studios), (d. 2016).
- September 13: Norman Alden, American actor (voice of Kay in The Sword in the Stone and Kranix in The Transformers: The Movie), (d. 2012).
- September 16:
  - Faith Hubley, American animator, storyboard artist (Mr. Magoo, co-founder of Storyboard Studios), (d. 2001).
  - Lauren Bacall, American actress and voice actress (voice of Freezelda in HBO Storybook Musicals, Madame Lacroque in Madeline: Lost in Paris, the Witch of the Waste in Howl's Moving Castle, The Grand Witch in Scooby-Doo! and the Goblin King, The Grey One in Ernest and Celestine, Evelyn in the Family Guy episode "Mom's the Word"), (d. 2014).
- September 26: Tony Sgroi, American comics artist and animator (worked for Warner Bros. animation, Bob Clampett, Walter Lantz, Hanna-Barbera), (d. 1998).

=== October ===
- October 3: Harvey Kurtzman, American comics artist, writer, publisher and animation scriptwriter (Mad Monster Party?, Sesame Street), (d. 1993).
- October 12: Doris Grau, American actress (voice of Lunchlady Doris in The Simpsons, Doris Grossman in The Critic), (d. 1995).
- October 25: Billy Barty, American actor (voice of Figment in Language Arts Through Imagination, Dweedle in Wildfire, Baitmouse in The Rescuers Down Under, Hips McManus in The New Batman Adventures episode "Double Talk"), (d. 2000).
- October 26: Ray Goossens, Belgian animator (Musti, Plons de Kikker) and comics artist, (d. 1998).

=== November ===
- November 2: Michi Kobi, American actress (additional voices in Courage the Cowardly Dog), (d. 2016).
- November 8: Joe Flynn, American actor (voice of Mr. Snoops in The Rescuers), (d. 1974).
- November 10: Russell Johnson, American actor (voice of Roy Hinkley in The New Adventures of Gilligan and Gilligan's Planet), (d. 2014).
- November 16: Tony Geiss, American author, songwriter (Sesame Street), producer and screenwriter (Sesame Street, An American Tail, The Land Before Time, Between the Lions, Play with Me Sesame), (d. 2011).
- November 21: Joseph Campanella, American actor (voice of the Lizard in Spider-Man, William Shepard / the Master in Road Rovers, Matthew Thorne in the Batman: The Animated Series episode "Paging the Crime Doctor"), (d. 2018).
- November 22: Geraldine Page, American actress (voice of Madame Medusa in The Rescuers), (d. 1987).
- November 29: Ralph James, American voice actor (voice of narrator in The Unmentionables, Mr. Turtle for Tootsie Pops, Orson in Mork & Mindy/Laverne & Shirley/Fonz Hour, additional voices in Dynomutt, Dog Wonder, Captain Caveman and the Teen Angels, and The Plastic Man Comedy/Adventure Show), (d. 1992).
- November 30: Allan Sherman, American musician, satirist and producer (voice of the title character in The Cat in the Hat and Dr. Seuss on the Loose), (d. 1973).

=== December ===
- December 2: Jack Davis, American cartoonist and illustrator (Rankin/Bass), (d. 2016).
- December 5: Wally Cox, American actor (voice of the title character in Underdog), (d. 1973).
- December 18: Gibba, Italian animator and comics artist, (d. 2018).
- December 19:
  - Cicely Tyson, American actress (voice of Mrs. Maureen Parker in The Proud Family episode "Behind Family Lines" and Great Aunt Shirley Hero in the Higglytown Heroes episode "Wayne's 100 Special Somethings"), (d. 2021).
  - Jack DeLeon, American actor (voice of the Human Torch in Fantastic Four, Sergeant Samuel McPherson in Halloween is Grinch Night, Dwalin, Fili, Kili, Oin, Gloin, Ori, Nori, Bifur and Bofur in The Hobbit, Kraven the Hunter in the Spider-Man episode "The Hunter and the Hunted", Nathan the fox in Stanley, the Ugly Duckling, Dark Entity in The Real Ghostbusters episode "Ragnarok and Roll", Major Courage in the DuckTales episode "Where No Duck Has Gone Before"), (d. 2006).
- December 20: Charlie Callas, American actor and comedian (voice of Elliott in Pete's Dragon), (d. 2011).
- December 30: Jean Bosc, A.K.A. Bosc, French editorial cartoonist and animator (Voyage en Boscavie), (d. 1973).

== Deaths ==
=== March ===
- March 30: Romeyn Beck Hough, American botanist and physician (he sold magic lantern and microscope slides made from the thinnest transverse sections), dies at an unknown age.
