= Spec O'Donnell =

American actor

- Spec O’Donnell
- Born: April 9, 1911; Fresno, California, United States
- Died: October 14, 1986 (aged 75); Los Angeles, California, United States
- Occupation: Actor
- Years active: 1923–1978

Walter D. "Spec" O'Donnell (April 9, 1911 – October 14, 1986) was an American film actor who appeared in more than 190 films between 1923 and 1978.

He worked frequently for producer Hal Roach, often appearing in silent comedies as the bratty son of Max Davidson or Charley Chase. His sound-era roles were mostly uncredited bits, often as bellhops, newsboys, and pages; he was playing adolescent roles well into his twenties. He has the unusual distinction of playing the same role (a newsboy) in both an original film and its remake: Princess O'Hara and It Ain't Hay.

== Early life ==
O'Donnell was born in Madera, California. His father, John O'Donnell, was a lumber mill labourer originally from Maryland. His mother and older siblings (Jack and Minnie) were born in California.

== Career ==
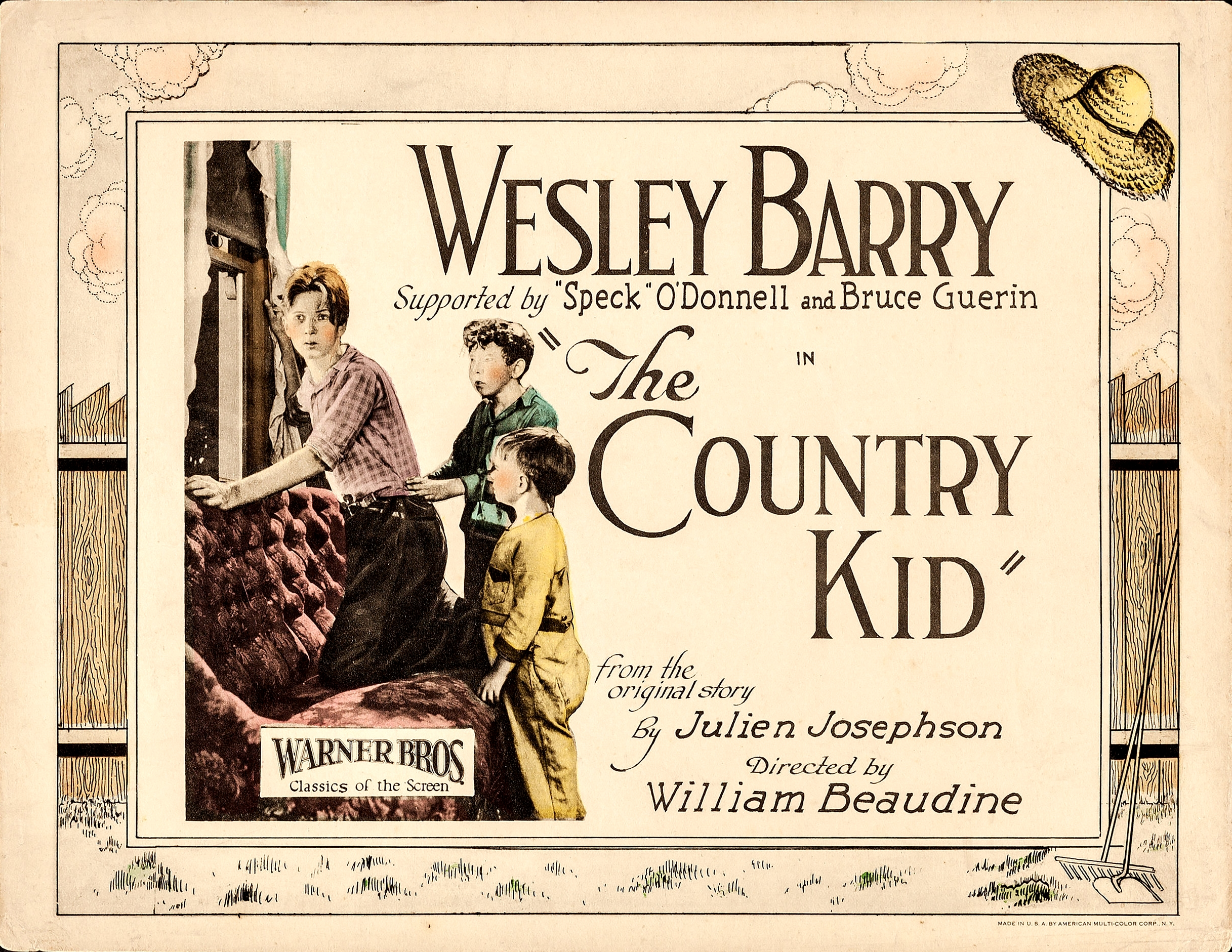
Lobby card for The Country Kid (1923) with O'Donnell in back

In February 1924, O'Donnell signed with Julius and Abe Stern's Century Film Corporation. In 1924, O'Donnell starred in Walt Disney's Alice Comedies. The first of these was Alice's Spooky Adventure, where he features as one of several children playing baseball in a field. The film also starred Virginia Davis (as Alice) and Leon Holmes, with whom O'Donnell featured alongside in Alice the Peacemaker during the same year. He also had parts in Alice Gets in Dutch and Alice is Stage Struck, which was released the following year.

== Personal life ==
O'Donnell died in 1986 in Woodland Hills, Los Angeles.

== Selected filmography ==
Year	Title	Role	Notes	Ref.
1923	Little Johnny Jones	Freckle-faced Little Boy		
1923	The Barefoot Boy	Schoolboy		
1923	The Country Kid	Joe Applegate		
1923	The Darling of New York	Willie		
1923	Main Street			
1924	The Foolish Virgin	Little Boy		
1924	Don't Fall	Spec	Short	
1924	Speed Boys	Spec	Short	
1924	Paging Money		Short	
1924	The Racing Kid		Short	
1924	Delivering the Goods	Spec	Short	
1924	Alice's Spooky Adventure	Freckled Boy	uncredited; Short	
1924	Alice the Peacemaker	Freckle-Faced Newsboy		
1924	Alice Gets in Dutch		Short	
1925	Alice Is Stage Struck			
1925	Tomorrow's Love			
1925	The Devil's Cargo	Jimmy		
1925	The Dressmaker from Paris	Jim		
1925	Little Annie Rooney	Abie		
1925	The Price of Success	Jimmy Moran		
1926	Sparrows	Ambrose		
1926	Private Izzy Murphy	The Monahan Kid		
1926	Hard Boiled	Eddie Blix		
1926	Old Ironsides	Cabin Boy	uncredited	
1926	Don Key	Office Boy	Also known as Don Key (Son of Burro)	
1927	Why Girls Say No	Maxie Whisselberg		
1927	Don't Tell Everything	Asher Ginsberg		
1927	Casey at the Bat	Spec		
1927	Special Delivery	Office Boy	uncredited	
1927	Call of the Cuckoo	Love's Greatest Mistake		
1928	Pass the Gravy	Ignatz		
1928	A Pair of Tights	The Kid		
1928	Vamping Venus	Western Union Boy / Mercury		
1928	Hot News	Spec		
1928	Danger Street	Sammy		
1929	In the Headlines	Johnny		
1929	The Sophomore	Joe's Nephew		
1930	The Grand Parade	Call Boy		
1930	Big Money	Elevator Boy		
1930	Two Plus Fours	Spec	Short	
1932	The Big Broadcast	Office Boy	uncredited	
1934	Broadway Bill	Higgins Flunky	uncredited	
1934	David Harum	Tim	uncredited	
1936	Cain and Mabel	Autograph Hound	uncredited	
1937	Blonde Trouble	Fred's Friend		
1937	Here's Flash Casey	Billy	uncredited	
1938	Angels with Dirty Faces	Pool Room Youth	uncredited	
1938	Accidents Will Happen	'Specs' Carter		
1943	Crazy House	Bellhop	uncredited	
1946	The Kid from Brooklyn	Arena Callboy	uncredited	
1951	Footlight Varieties	Contestant	uncredited	
1952	Pat and Mike	Hick's Caddy	uncredited	
1959	Alfred Hitchcock Presents	Club Member (uncredited)	Season 5 Episode 12: "Specialty of the House"	
1978	Convoy	18 Wheel Eddie		
