= Breed of the Border =

Breed of the Border may refer to:

- Breed of the Border (1933 film), an American Western film
- Breed of the Border (1924 film), an American silent Western film
