= Alice Gets Stung =

1925 film by Walt Disney

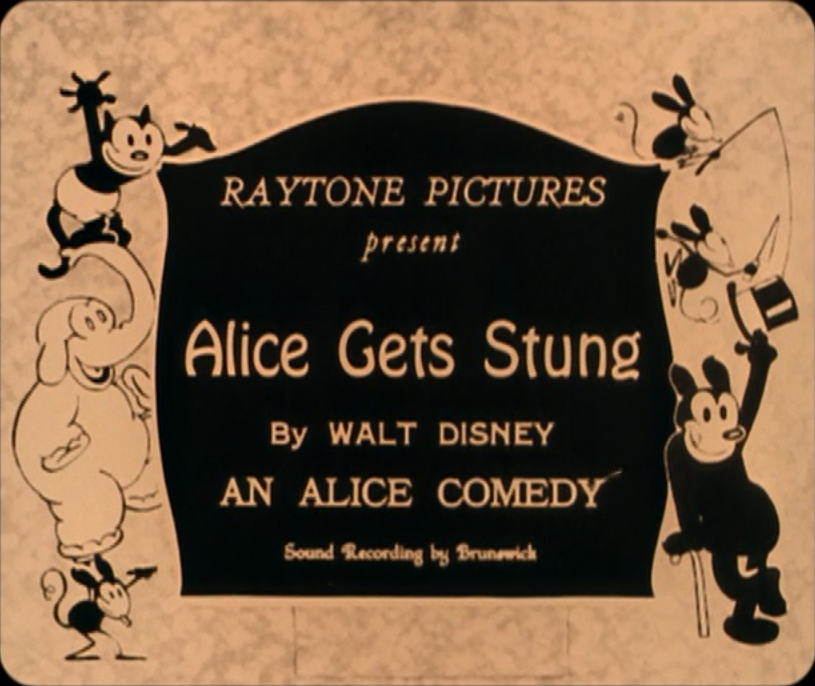
- Directed by: Walt Disney
- Produced by: M.J. Winkler
- Color process: Black and white
- Production company: Winkler Pictures
- Distributed by: Winkler Pictures
- Release date: February 1, 1925
- Running time: 8 minutes
- Country: United States
- Language: Silent

Alice Gets Stung is a 1925 animated silent short film directed by Walt Disney in the Alice Comedies series. It was Virginia Davis' last performance as Alice.

== Plot ==
Julius the Cat and Alice are hunting a wily rabbit, when they come across a bear, among other animals. Alice attempts to shoot the bear, but the bear ends up chasing them into a barrel. The bear then knocks a bee hive into the barrel (thus the "gets stung" in the title).

== Film ==
Reissued version of the film
