= Alice's Orphan =

1926 film

- Alice's Orphan
- Directed by: Walt Disney
- Produced by: M. J. Winkler
- Animation by: Ub Iwerks; Rollin Hamilton; Thurston Harper; Hugh Harman; Rudolf Ising
- Color process: Black and white
- Production company: Winkler Pictures
- Distributed by: Winkler Pictures
- Release date: January 15, 1926
- Running time: 6:36
- Country: United States
- Language: Silent

Alice's Orphan is a 1926 silent animated short film directed by Walt Disney. It is part of the Alice Comedies.

== Plot ==
Julius is spending his time at the winter outdoors, ice skating on a frozen lake. Coincidentally, an unnamed female cat places a basket on an edge of the lake, and leaves. Something in the basket made a noise momentarily, and Julius heard it. He then approaches and opens the basket. To his amazement, Julius picks up and finds a lost kitten inside. Without anyone else willing to adopt, the big cat decides to take in the little feline.

Julius arrives home with the orphan kitten. Alice, who has been waiting in the living room, was also amazed to see what her friend brought into the house. She then wonders what name the kitten should wear. In no time Julius finds out the kitten is a male and therefore gives the name Oscar.

After giving Oscar a bath, Julius takes his little friend to have supper with them. At the table, Oscar is eating in an aggressive way, which Julius sees as inappropriate. Julius attempts to teach the Oscar how to have meals in a more traditional fashion, but the kitten shows no interest to follow. The frustrated Julius starts pounding the table until a bowl of soup jumps straight up and spills on top of him. Oscar finds this comical and therefore hurls a roast chicken at Julius, knocking the big cat off his chair.

Then it was bedtime. Julius puts pajamas on Oscar before laying the kitten to bed. To help Oscar sleep, the big cat sings a lullaby and rocks the bed back and forth. When the little cat is seemingly dozing, Julius tries to tiptoe out of the bedroom, only to notice Oscar suddenly wake up and cry. The big cat repeats the same method but still gets the same result. As a last resort, Julius grabs a wooden mallet and thumps Oscar in the head but not hard enough cause a lump. With the kitten finally fast asleep, Julius was able to exit the room.

== Home media ==
The cartoon is featured in Alice in Cartoonland – The Original Alice Comedies by Walt Disney Home Entertainment.
