= Alice in Wonderland (Disney film) =

Alice in Wonderland is the name of several films produced by The Walt Disney Company based on Lewis Carroll's novels Alice's Adventures in Wonderland and Through the Looking-Glass:

- Alice in Wonderland (1951 film), an animated film directed by Clyde Geronimi, Wilfred Jackson, and Hamilton Luske
- Alice in Wonderland (2010 film), a live-action film directed by Tim Burton
- Alice Through the Looking Glass (2016 film), a sequel to the 2010 film

== See also ==
- Alice in Wonderland (franchise)
- The Alice Comedies, a series of animated cartoons created by Walt Disney in the 1920s, in which a live-action little girl named Alice has adventures in an animated landscape
