= Alice Solves the Puzzle =

1925 film by Walt Disney

- The film
- Directed by: Walt Disney
- Produced by: M.J. Winkler
- Starring: Margie Gay
- Animation by: Ub Iwerks; Rollin Hamilton; Thurston Harper
- Color process: Black and white
- Production company: Winkler Pictures
- Distributed by: Winkler Pictures
- Release date: February 15, 1925
- Running time: 6:54
- Country: United States
- Language: Silent

Alice Solves the Puzzle is a 1925 silent animated short film directed by Walt Disney. It was the 15th film in the Alice Comedies series, and is notable for being the first film to feature Pete, the longest-recurring Disney character. The film is also notable for being one of the first animated films to have been heavily censored.

== Plot ==
A girl named Alice (Margie Gay) is struggling to complete a difficult crossword-puzzle when her cat Julius tells her they should go to the beach. After a quick swim in the ocean, the pair dry off and Alice continues her puzzle. Just as she begins, Bootleg Pete (a collector of rare crossword-puzzles who discovers that her puzzle is the one that he’s missing) demands the puzzle.

After she refuses his demands, Pete becomes angry, and Alice smacks him in the face, which enrages Pete. She runs for shelter inside a lighthouse, but Pete breaks down the door and chases Alice around the lighthouse. Alice screams for help and Julius comes to her rescue. He reaches the top and a fight breaks out between the two. Julius wins the fight by knocking Pete off of the lighthouse. Alice then discovers the last phrase in her puzzle, "The End".

== Legacy ==
=== Pete ===
Alice Solves the Puzzle was the first film to feature the antagonist Pete. He would go on to become the longest running character of all the Disney animated creations. In this first installment he is referred to as "Bootleg Pete" because of his use of whiskey (at a time when alcohol was illegal due to prohibition in the US). Because of his peg used for a right leg, he quickly gained the nickname Peg-Leg Pete. The early Pete was portrayed as a bear, which he would stay for most of his early appearances until the advent of Mickey Mouse. Pete subsequently became a large cat.

=== Censorship ===
When Russell Merritt examined a German print of Alice Solves the Puzzle, he was surprised to find an additional scene missing from American prints. In most prints of Pete's first scene, he is shown speeding in a boat being pulled by a pelican. He passes James, the police dog, who blows a whistle and chases him. Pete simply turns and laughs. However, Merrit discovered in the German version that Pete is stopped by a customs inspector who examines the boat, then lets him pass. Pete then opens the pelican's mouth and pulls out a bottle of bootleg whiskey.

This scene was cut because the Pennsylvania Censorship Board asked Disney to cut the scene during its first release. Disney then directed Winkler Studios, his distributor, to cut the scene from any further U.S. releases.

The only remnant of the scene in the United States is two frames in which Pete's whiskey bottle is still visible.
