= Somewhere in Turkey =

1918 film

- Directed by: Alfred J. Goulding
- Produced by: Hal Roach
- Starring: Harold Lloyd
- Production company: Rolin Films
- Distributed by: Pathé Exchange
- Release date: June 16, 1918
- Running time: 12 minutes
- Country: United States
- Language: Silent (English intertitles)

Somewhere in Turkey is a 1918 American silent comedy short film featuring Harold Lloyd.

== Plot ==
A girl (Bebe Daniels) survives a shipwreck. Upon reaching shore, she is apprehended by several soldiers of a sultan who forcibly bring her to him. The girl immediately rejects the sultan's advances and is promptly thrown into a basement jail cell. A professor (Harold Lloyd) and his assistant (Snub Pollard) are travelling by camel through the desert. The out-of-control beast brings them to the sultan's residence. They find a rock bearing an Arabic inscription. Curious, they venture inside to find out what the words mean. They inadvertently interrupt the sultan watching a dancing girl. The angry sultan tells the visitors that the rock bears a warning that if any white man enters the building, he will not leave it alive. The two men try to flee, but Harold is eventually caught. He is erroneously put in the same jail cell as the girl. When the sultan sees this mistake, he angrily breaks into the cell to punish both of them. Harold uses the opportunity to escape with the girl and head for Brooklyn on his camel.

== Cast ==
- Harold Lloyd as A Fearless Explorer
- Snub Pollard as His Assistant
- Bebe Daniels as A Girl in Danger
- William Blaisdell
- Sammy Brooks
- Harry Burns
- Louise Carver
- Lige Conley (credited as Lige Cromley)
- Billy Fay
- William Gillespie
- Helen Gilmore
- Lew Harvey
- Wallace Howe
- Dee Lampton
- Gus Leonard
- James Parrott
- Charles Stevenson (credited as Charles E. Stevenson)
- Dorothea Wolbert

== Reception ==
Like many American films of the time, Somewhere in Turkey was subject to restrictions and cuts by city and state film censorship boards. For example, the Chicago Board of Censors cut three scenes of sticking spear into man's posterior, scene of spear in woman's posterior, and spear in old man's posterior.

== See also ==
- Harold Lloyd filmography
