= Alice the Toreador =

1925 film by Walt Disney

- The film
- Directed by: Walt Disney
- Produced by: M.J. Winkler
- Color process: Black and white
- Production company: Winkler Pictures
- Distributed by: Winkler Pictures
- Release date: January 15, 1925
- Running time: 7:32
- Country: United States
- Language: Silent

Alice the Toreador is a 1925 animated short silent film directed by Walt Disney. It is part of the Alice Comedies series.

== Plot ==
Alice and Julius play bullfighters, selecting a peaceful old steer as their "bull". However, when Terrible Tom swaps the steer with a legitimate bull, Alice is forced to run for her life. Alice and Julius trap the bull in a pen, and Julius takes on the role of the bull. Their ruse is soon revealed when a dog pulls the bull skin off of Julius, and the crowd reacts angrily to the deception.
