= Louise Carver =

American actress (1869–1956)

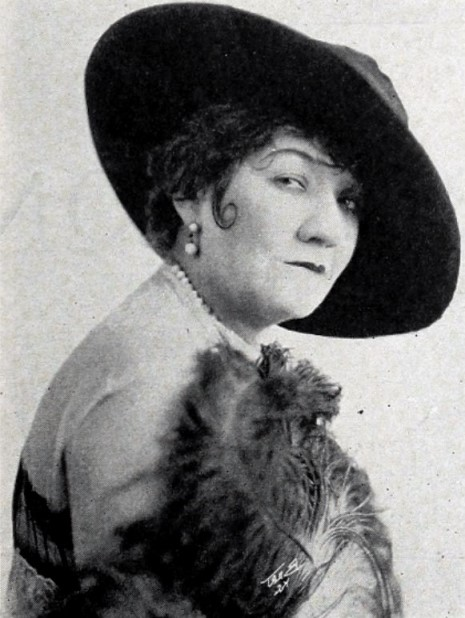
- Carver in 1925
- Born: Mary Louise Stieger; June 9, 1869; Davenport, Iowa, U.S.
- Died: June 19, 1956 (aged 87); Los Angeles, California, U.S.
- Other names: Louise Spilger Murray; Louise Carver Murray
- Occupation: Actress
- Years active: 1908–1941
- Spouse: Tom Murray (?–1935) (his death)

Louise Carver (June 9, 1869 – June 19, 1956) was an American actress who performed in grand opera, stage, nickelodeon, and motion pictures.

== Early years and career ==
Born Mary Louise Steiger in Davenport, Iowa, she was the daughter of Mr. and Mrs. Fritz Stieger.

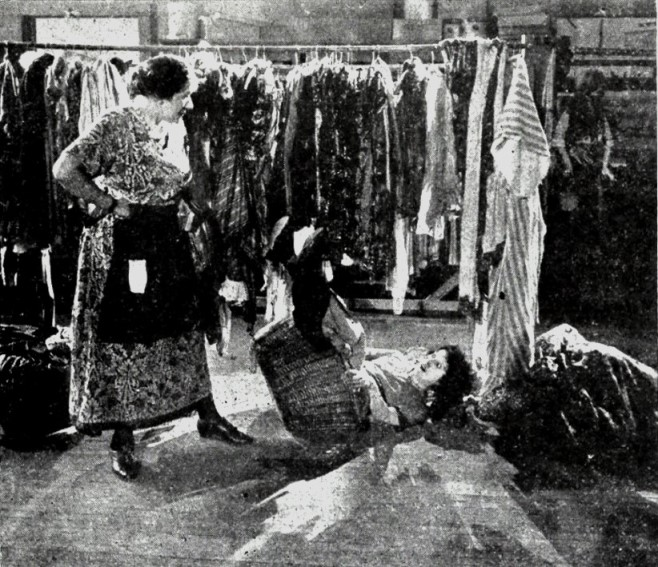
Still from The Extra Girl (1923) with Louise Carver and Mabel Normand

Carver, a tall woman, made her first appearance on stage as a teenager, and her grand opera debut came at the Auditorium Theatre, Chicago, Illinois in 1892. In 1908, she made her screen debut in Macbeth. She came to national prominence as a comedian in Mack Sennett silent films such as The Hollywood Kid (1924). One of her bigger roles on stage was as the leading lady of Lew Fields in Mrs. Henpecks, which played on Broadway for months in 1912–1913. Her final screen credits are from 1941. This year, she made Love at First Fright and had uncredited roles in Tight Shoes and Some More of Samoa.

== Personal life and death ==
She married Tom Murray in 1935 becoming (Mary) Louise Steiger Murray.

On January 19, 1956, Carver died at her home in Los Angeles, California, aged 87. Her funeral was conducted at Hollywood Chapel and she was buried in Chapel of the Pines Crematory.

== Partial filmography ==
- Macbeth (1908, Short) – Lady Macbeth
- Romeo and Juliet (1908, Short) – Nurse
- Court House Crooks (1915, Short)
- Somewhere in Turkey (1918, Short)
- Main Street (1923) – Mrs. Donovan
- Scaramouche (1923) – Member of Theatre Audience (uncredited)
- The Extra Girl (1923) – Madame McCarthy – Wardrobe Mistress
- The Cat's Meow (1924, Short) – Anti-Slum Committee Woman
- Fight and Win (1924)
- Breed of the Border (1924) – Ma Malone
- Seven Chances (1925) – Prospective Bride Who Operates Crane (uncredited)
- Shameful Behavior? (1926) – Sally Long
- The Fortune Hunter (1927) – Drygoods Store Owner
- The Missing Link (1927) – Woman at Baggage Area (uncredited)
- Backstage (1927) – Referee
- Old San Francisco (1927) – Big-nosed Woman on the Mile of Hell (uncredited)
- Blondes by Choice (1927) – Miss Perkins
- Flying Luck (1927) – A Passerby
- The Girl from Everywhere (1927) – Minor Role (uncredited)
- The Big Noise (1928) – Matron (uncredited)
- The Godless Girl (1928) – Prison Matron (uncredited)
- Guardians of the Wild (1928) – Henchwoman (uncredited)
- The Barker (1928) – Fortune Teller (uncredited)
- Wolves of the City (1929) – Mother Machin
- The Redeeming Sin (1929)
- The Office Scandal (1929) – Battered Wife (uncredited)
- Barnum Was Right (1929) – Treasure Hotel Guest (uncredited)
- Tonight at Twelve (1929) – Ellen
- The Sap (1929) – Mrs. Sprague
- Party Girl (1930) – Masseuse (uncredited)
- Free and Easy (1930) – Big German Woman (uncredited)
- The Man from Blankley's (1930) – Mrs. Gilwattle
- Back Pay (1930) – Masseuse (uncredited)
- Estrellados (1930) – Actress at Casting Call (uncredited)
- The Big Trail (1930) – Gus's mother-in-law
- Always Goodbye (1931) – Tenant in Hallway (uncredited)
- Side Show (1931) – Dolores – Bearded Lady (uncredited)
- Guests Wanted (1932, Short) – Mrs. Carver
- Riders of the Desert (1932) – Slim's Wife
- Handle with Care (1932) – Hat Customer
- The Monkey's Paw (1933) – Minor Role (uncredited)
- Hallelujah, I'm a Bum (1933) – Ma Sunday
- The Devil's Brother (1933) – Tavern Patron (uncredited)
- Morning Glory (1933) – Miss Waterman (uncredited)
- Roman Scandals (1933) – Lady Slave Bidder (uncredited)
- Kid Millions (1934) – Native Woman (uncredited)
- Every Night at Eight (1935) – Mrs. Snyder
- Disorder in the Court (1936, Short) – Flirting Juror (uncredited)
- The Longest Night (1936) – Scrubwoman Swinging Mop (uncredited)
- Dizzy Doctors (1937, Short) – Lady By Car (uncredited)
- New Faces of 1937 (1937) – Former Beauty Contestant at Audition (uncredited)
- High, Wide and Handsome (1937) – Townswoman (uncredited)
- Tight Shoes (1941) – Wedding Woman (uncredited)
- Some More of Samoa (1941, Short) – The King's Sister (uncredited) (final film role)
