= The Extra Girl =

1923 film

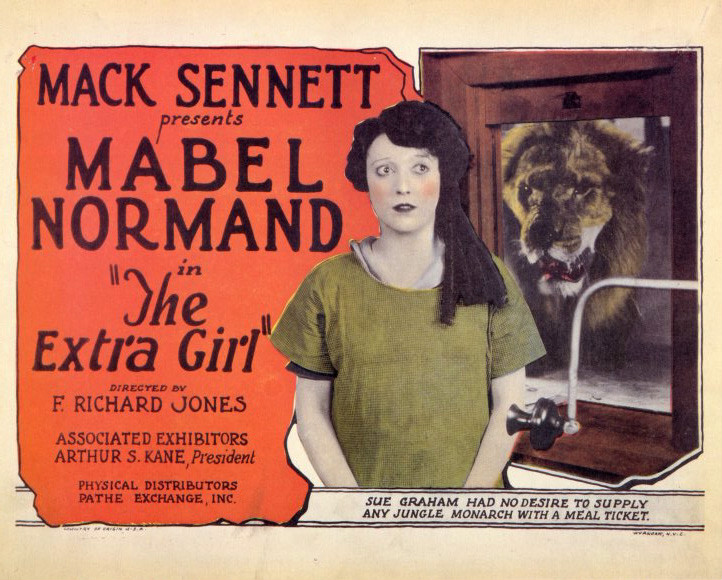
- Lobby card
- Directed by: F. Richard Jones
- Written by: Bernard McConville
- Story by: Mack Sennett
- Produced by: Mack Sennett
- Starring: Mabel Normand; Ralph Graves; George Nichols
- Cinematography: Eric Crockett; Homer Scott
- Distributed by: Associated Exhibitors; Pathé Exchange
- Release date: October 28, 1923 (United States)
- Running time: 68 mins.
- Country: United States
- Language: Silent (English intertitles)

The Extra Girl is a 1923 American silent comedy film directed by F. Richard Jones and starring Mabel Normand. Produced by Mack Sennett, The Extra Girl followed earlier films about the film industry and also paved the way for later films about Hollywood, such as King Vidor's Show People (1928). It was still unusual in 1923 for filmmakers to make a film about the southern California film industry, then little more than ten years old. Still, many of the Hollywood clichés of small town girls travelling to Hollywood to become film stars are here to reinforce the myths of "Tinseltown".

== Plot ==
Sue Graham is a small town girl who travels to Hollywood to escape marriage, and in the hope of becoming a motion picture star. She wins a contract with a studio on the strength of a picture of a quite different (and very attractive) girl sent instead of hers; but when she arrives the mistake is discovered. Since the error was the result of another's deception, the studio manager agrees to give her a job in the costume department. She eventually gets the opportunity to screen test, but it turns out disastrously – although in a nod to the actress behind the character the director calls her "a natural comedian." Sue's parents come out to California, and invest money with a shifty individual who swindles them out of their life savings. Sue and childhood friend Dave, who has also followed her, retrieve the money. Despite the unsuccessful film career, all turns out well.

== Cast ==
The film

- Mabel Normand as Sue Graham
- George Nichols as Zachariah "Pa" Graham
- Anna Dodge as Mary "Ma" Graham (credited as Anna Hernandez)
- Ralph Graves as Dave Giddings
- Vernon Dent as Aaron Applejohn
- Ramsey Wallace as T. Phillip Hackett
- Charlotte Mineau as Belle "Widow" Brown
- Mary Mason as Actress
- Max Davidson as Tailor
- Louise Carver as Madame McCarthy, Wardrobe Mistress
- Carl Stockdale as Director
- Harry Gribbon as Comedy Director
- George Beranger as Actor in Wardrobe Line (credited as André Beranger)
- Teddy the Dog as Teddy
- Billy Armstrong as Comedian in Derby (uncredited)
- Duke the Dog as Duke (uncredited)
- Robert Dudley as Financier (uncredited)
- Charles K. French as Studio Manager (uncredited)
- Numa the Lion as Numa (uncredited)
- Jackie Lucas as Son (uncredited)
- Eric Mayne as Lion Film Director (uncredited)
- Elsie Tarron as Actress (uncredited)
- Steve Murphy as Party Guest

Actors Billy Bevan and William Desmond appear as themselves. Producer Mack Sennett can be glimpsed briefly as a straw-hatted onlooker at Sue's screen test.

== Production ==
Directed by F. Richard Jones, the film features several shots of semi-rural Southern California (the Edendale area along present-day Glendale Boulevard, where Sennett's studio was located) showing houses and streets of the early 1920s, and of a Hollywood studio in action. One shot in particular, a high-angle view, shows a film set, with actors, two cameras and operators, several production people, and a mood orchestra composed of a pianist and violinist, to set the proper mood for the actors. Another shows an open stage with crew scrambling up scaffolding to the sunlight diffusing panels above.

While filming the lion scene, the lion at one point broke free and lunged for Normand, who fainted in terror. The trainer attempted to subdue the lion by jabbing it with a pitchfork, but in the confusion missed and hit Normand instead.

The Extra Girl was Normand's final feature film and her last film working with producer Sennett.

== Survival ==
Prints of The Extra Girl are held in several archives and it has been released on DVD.
