= Alice's Spooky Adventure =

1924 film by Walt Disney

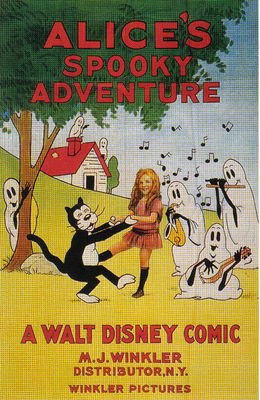
- Theatrical release poster
- Directed by: Walt Disney
- Produced by: M.J. Winkler
- Starring: Virginia Davis; Leon Holmes; Spec O'Donnell
- Color process: Black and white
- Production company: Winkler Pictures
- Distributed by: Winkler Pictures
- Release date: April 1, 1924
- Country: United States
- Language: English

Alice's Spooky Adventure is a 1924 animated black-and-white silent film directed by Walt Disney.

Alice's Spooky Adventure

== Plot ==
When a ball is accidentally knocked through the window of a neighbourhood haunted house, Alice is the only one brave enough to go inside to retrieve it. While she is in there she falls and bumps her head, sending her to a cartoon dreamworld in which she rescues a cat and battles some spirits in a ghost town. When she awakens, she retrieves the ball, only to find out that police have investigated the scene. The police chase Alice, believing her to be responsible for the scene, and arrest her.

== Cast ==
- Virginia Davis as Alice
- Leon Holmes as the tubby Boy
- Spec O'Donnell as a boy
