= Main Street (1923 film) =

1923 film by Harry Beaumont

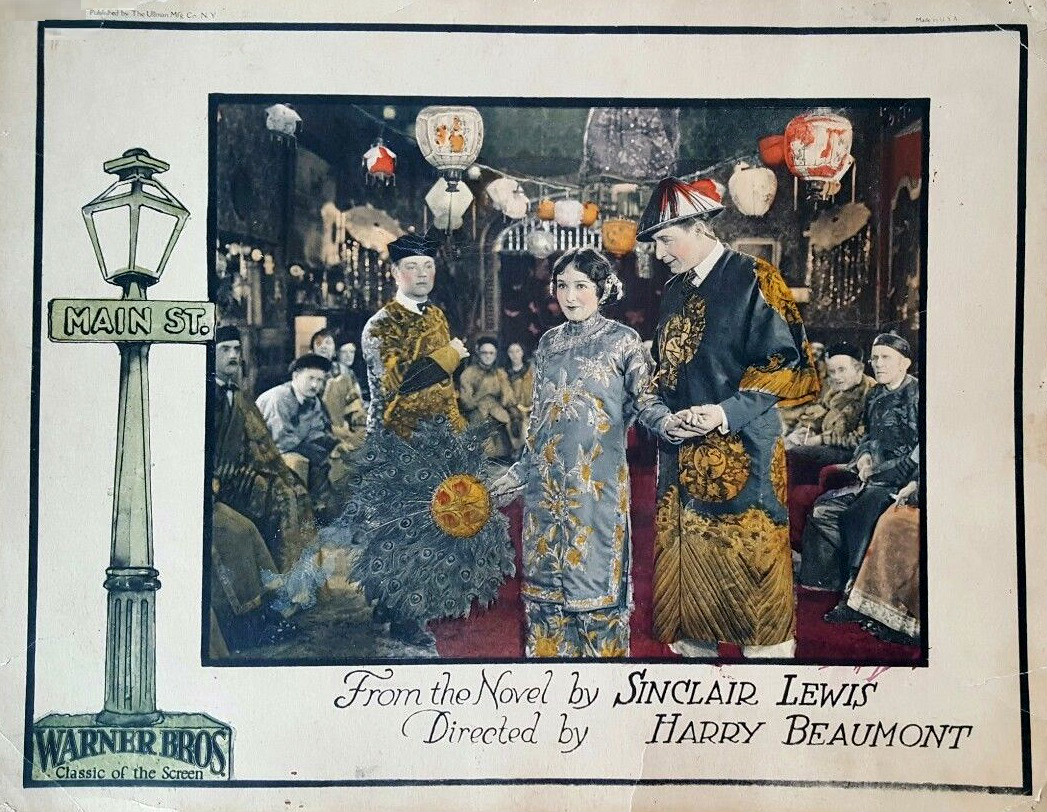
- Lobby card
- Directed by: Harry Beaumont
- Written by: Julien Josephson
- Based on: Main Street by Sinclair Lewis
- Starring: Florence Vidor; Monte Blue; Alan Hale, Sr. Louise Fazenda
- Cinematography: Edwin B. Du Par; Homer Scott
- Edited by: Harry Beaumont
- Production company: Warner Bros.
- Distributed by: Warner Bros.
- Release date: April 25, 1923
- Running time: 96 minutes (9 reels)
- Country: United States
- Language: Silent (English intertitles)
- Budget: $270,000
- Box office: $556,000

Main Street is a 1923 American silent drama film based on the 1920 novel of the same name by Sinclair Lewis. It was produced and distributed by Warner Bros. and directed by Harry Beaumont. A Broadway play version of the novel was produced in 1921. It was the first film to be released after the foundation of Warner Bros. Pictures on April 4, 1923.

== Plot ==
As described in a film magazine review, a young city woman with advanced ideas marries a small town doctor, and go to live in a backwoods burg. Her irritation at the small talk and petty incidents which make up the lives of the townspeople finally culminate in her leaving home and going to work as a government clerk in Washington, D.C. After a time her husband follows her there and there is a reunion.

== Cast ==
- Florence Vidor as Carol Milford
- Monte Blue as Dr. Will Kennicott
- Harry Myers as Dave Dyer
- Robert Gordon as Erik Valborg
- Noah Beery as Adolph Valborg
- Alan Hale as Miles Bjornstam
- Louise Fazenda as Bea Sorenson
- Anne Schaefer as Mrs. Valborg
- Josephine Crowell as Widow Bogart
- Otis Harlan as Ezra Stowbody
- Gordon Griffith as Cy Bogart
- Lon Poff as Chet Dashaway
- J. P. Lockney as Luke Dawson
- Gilbert Clayton as Sam Clark
- Jack McDonald as Nat Hicks
- Michael Dark as Guy Pollock
- Estelle Short as Mrs. Dashaway
- Glen Cavender as Harry Haydock
- Katherine Perry as Mrs. Dave Dyer
- Aileen Manning as Mrs. Stowbody
- Mrs. Hayward Mack as Mrs. Haydock
- Louis King as Mr. Volstead
- Josephine Kirkwood as Mrs. Sam Clark
- Louise Carver as Mrs. Donovan
- Hal Wilson as Del Snaflin

== Box office ==
According to Warner Bros. records, the film earned $510,000 domestically and $46,000 foreign.

== Preservation status ==
Main Street is a lost film. Warner Bros. records of the film's negative have a notation, "Junked 12/27/48" (i.e., December 27, 1948). Warner Bros. destroyed many of its negatives in the late 1940s and 1950s due to the nitrate decomposition of its pre-1933 films.

== See also ==
- I Married a Doctor, 1936 film adaptation of Main Street
