= Breed of the Border (1924 film) =

1924 film

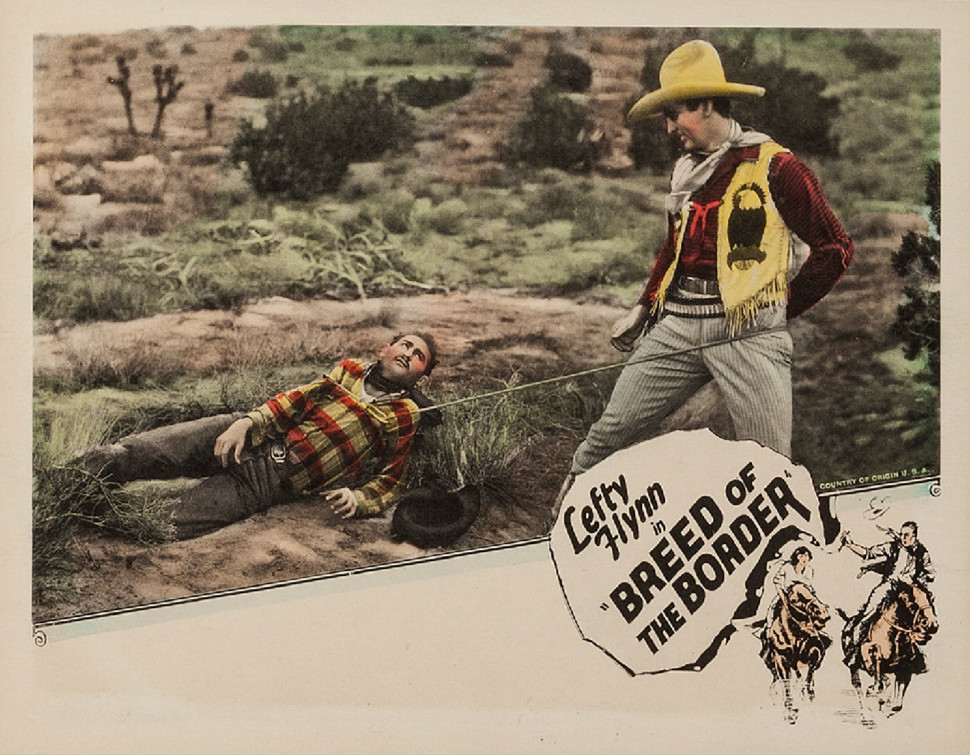
- Lobby card
- Directed by: Harry Garson
- Written by: Dorothy Arzner; Paul Gangelin
- Based on: "The Breed of the Border" by William Dawson Hoffman
- Produced by: Harry Garson
- Starring: Maurice 'Lefty' Flynn; Dorothy Dwan; Louise Carver
- Cinematography: J. Henry Kruse; William H. Tuers
- Production company: Harry Garson Productions
- Distributed by: Film Booking Offices of America
- Release date: December 28, 1924
- Running time: 50 minutes
- Country: United States
- Languages: Silent; English intertitles

Breed of the Border is a 1924 American silent Western film directed by Harry Garson and starring Maurice 'Lefty' Flynn, Dorothy Dwan, and Louise Carver.

== Plot ==
As described in a film magazine review, Circus Lacy arrives in a border town following the robbery of a mine, finding the father of Ethel Slocum is under suspicion. He protects Slocum from Sheriff Wells and then routes a bully who menaces Ethel. Later he locates the stronghold of the bandits who are led by Red Lucas and captures the leader.

== Cast ==
- Maurice 'Lefty' Flynn as 'Circus' Lacey
- Dorothy Dwan as Ethel Slocum
- Louise Carver as Ma Malone
- Milton Ross as Dad Slocum
- Frank Hagney as Sheriff Wells
- Fred Burns as Deputy Leverie
- Joseph Bennett as Red Lucas
- William Donovan as Pablo

== Preservation ==
With no prints of Breed of the Border located in any film archives, it is a lost film.
