= Alice's Wonderland =

1923 film by Walt Disney

- Alice's Wonderland, from the Laugh-O-Grams series
- Directed by: Walt Disney
- Story by: Walt Disney
- Produced by: Walt Disney
- Starring: Walt Disney; Ub Iwerks; Rudolf Ising; Virginia Davis; Hugh Harman; Margaret Davis
- Animation by: Rudolf Ising; Ub Iwerks; Hugh Harman; Carman Maxwell
- Color process: Black and white
- Production company: Laugh-O-Gram Studio
- Running time: 12:29
- Country: United States
- Language: Silent with English intertitles

Alice's Wonderland is a 1923 American silent live-action animated comedy short film directed and produced by Walt Disney. It was produced in Kansas City, Missouri, by Laugh-O-Gram Studio as its final film before bankruptcy. The black-and-white short was the first in a series of Walt Disney's famous Alice Comedies and had a working title of Alice in Slumberland.

== Plot ==
Alice (Virginia Davis) visits the Laugh-O-Gram Studio, where the animators (including Walt Disney) show her various scenes on their drawing boards. In an exaggerated depiction of the animation process, the cartoon characters literally move by themselves as Alice and the animators watch. That night, she dreams of taking a train to cartoon-land, where a red carpet reception awaits. She appears in live action. They have a welcoming parade, with Alice riding on an elephant. The cartoons dance for her, and she dances for them. Meanwhile, lions break out of the zoo. The lions chase her into a hollow tree, then into a cave and down a rabbit hole. They corner her at a cliffside and she jumps off. Alice is then woken up by her mother, and begins telling her about the dream.

== Release ==
The film was never shown theatrically, but was instead shown to prospective film distributors. The New York branch of Pictorial Clubs Inc. at some point handled non-theatrical distribution of the short through an arrangement with Pathé Exchange, who copyrighted the short as Alice in Slumberland on September 29, 1926.

The short was released on December 6, 2005, on Walt Disney Treasures: Disney Rarities - Celebrated Shorts: 1920s–1960s.

It was also included as a bonus feature in the Special "Un-Anniversary Edition" of Alice in Wonderland.

== In popular culture ==
The eighth episode of the 2014 Cartoon Network miniseries Over the Garden Wall, entitled "Babes in the Wood", contains several direct visual references to Alice's Wonderland, including the Reception Committee scene.
