= Alice Comedies =

Film series by Walt Disney in the 1920s

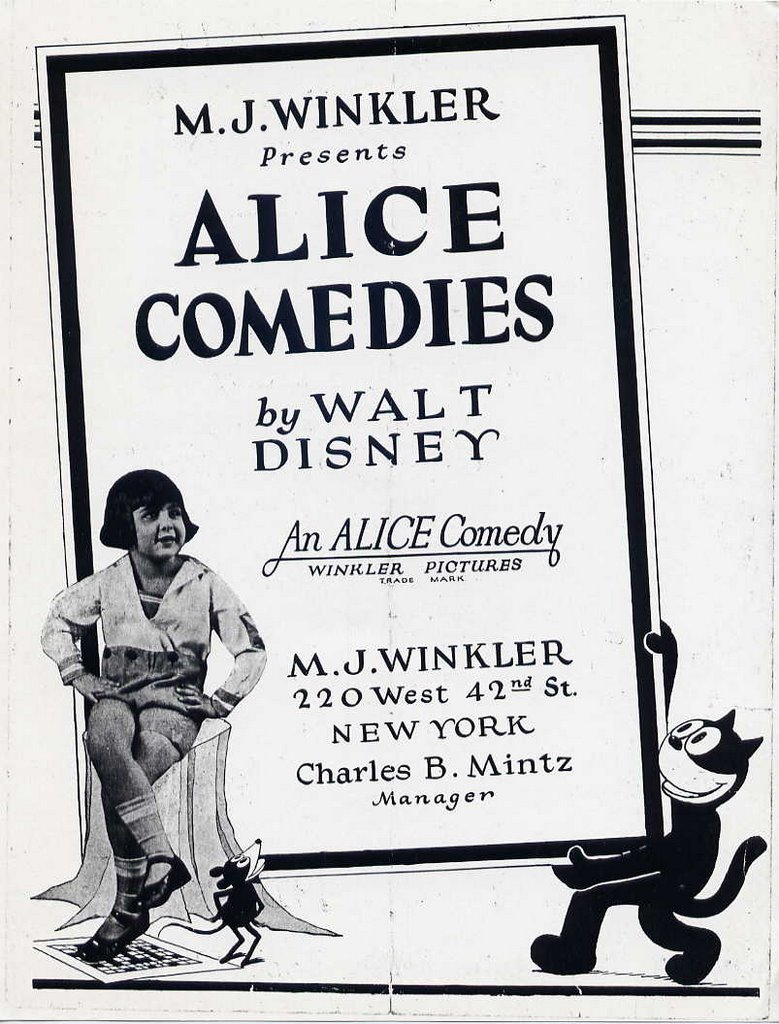
- Alice Comedies poster
- Directed by: Walt Disney
- Produced by: Margaret J. Winkler
- Starring: Alice: Virginia Davis (1–14, 26); Margie Gay (15, 17–25, 27–47); Dawn O'Day (16); Lois Hardwick (48–57)
- Animation by: Ub Iwerks; Rollin Hamilton; Hugh Harman; Rudolf Ising
- Color process: Black and white
- Production companies: Laugh-O-Gram Studio; Winkler Pictures
- Distributed by: Winkler Pictures; Film Booking Offices of America
- Country: United States
- Language: English (with intertitles)

The Alice Comedies are a series of live-action animated shorts created by Walt Disney and produced by Winkler Pictures. It features a live action little girl named Alice (originally played by Virginia Davis) and an animated cat named Julius having adventures in an animated landscape. The shorts were the first series by what ultimately became Walt Disney Animation Studios.

== Alice's Wonderland ==
Disney, Ub Iwerks, and their staff made the first Alice Comedy, a one-reel (ten-minute) 1923 short subject titled Alice's Wonderland, while still heading the failing Laugh-O-Gram Studio in Kansas City, Missouri.

Alice's Wonderland begins with Alice entering a cartoon studio to witness cartoons being created. Alice is amazed by what she sees: the cartoon characters come to life and play around. After heading to bed that night, she dreams of being in the cartoon world, welcomed by all of the characters. Alice plays with them until a group of lions break free from a cage and chase her. Though never released theatrically, this short pioneered live-action animated films with its contemporary, Bray Productions' Out of the Inkwell series.

== The Alice Comedies series begins ==
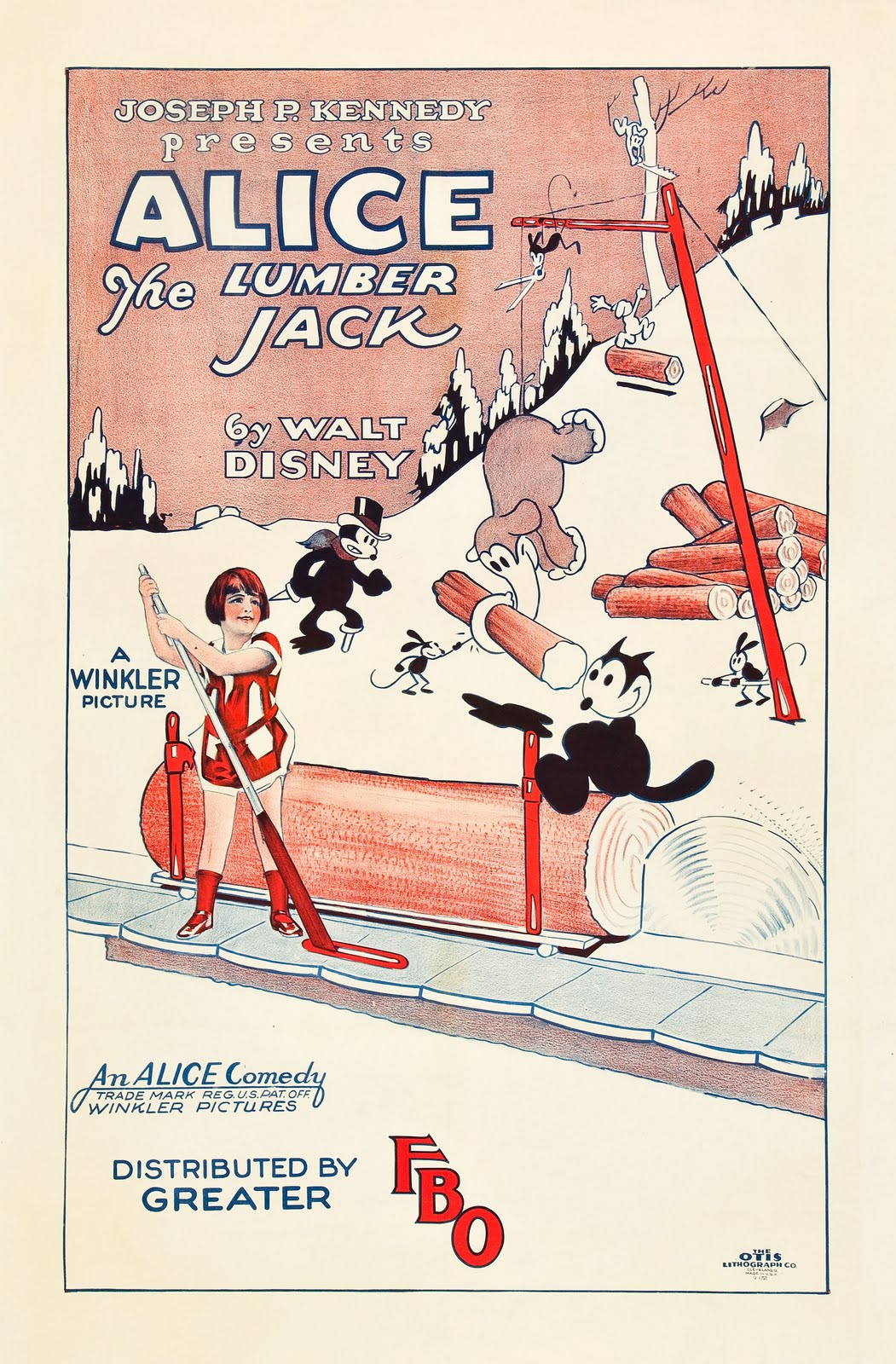
Poster for the 1926 film Alice the Lumber Jack. Margie Gay plays Alice.

After completing the film, the studio went bankrupt and was forced to shut down. After raising money by working as a freelance photographer, Disney bought a one-way train ticket to Los Angeles, California to live with his uncle Robert and his brother Roy. In California, Disney continued to send out proposals for the Alice series, in hopes of obtaining a distribution agreement. A deal was finally arranged through Winkler Pictures, run by Margaret Winkler and her fiancé, Charles Mintz. Because of a recent falling out with Pat Sullivan, the studio needed a quick replacement for their centerpiece Felix the Cat animated series. Disney convinced Davis's family to bring her from Missouri to Los Angeles to star in the series.

== Shorts and subsequent releases ==
Walt Disney directed all 57 films in this series. Over the course of the series, four actresses played Alice: Virginia Davis (15), Margie Gay (31), Dawn O'Day (1) and Lois Hardwick (10). The film Alice in the Jungle contains only archival footage of Virginia Davis.

Non-theatrical distribution of Alice's Wonderland was handled by the New York branch of Pictorial Clubs Inc. through an arrangement with Pathé Exchange, who copyrighted the short as Alice in Slumberland on September 29, 1926. In May 1926, it was announced that Film Booking Offices of America would release what would ultimately be the last 26 shorts in the series. The copyrights to the FBO-released shorts were assigned to R-C Pictures, while the copyrights to Alice Solves the Puzzle and Alice Wins the Derby were assigned to M. J. Winkler. In March 1930, Raytone Pictures (later known as Syndicate Pictures) announced it was re-releasing 18 Alice Comedies shorts with music and sound recorded by Brunswick. They were released between September 1, 1930 and May 15, 1931.

The shorts in this series are now all in the public domain in the United States, being either never registered or not renewed by copyright owners RKO Pictures (successor to FBO) and Columbia Pictures (owner of Winkler Pictures). In 2000, Inkwell Images released Alice in Cartoonland – The Original Alice Comedies by Walt Disney in VHS, and in 2007 in DVD as part of the Golden Classics series with ten of the films as well as a documentary, poster gallery, and DVD ROM. In 2007, Kit Parker Films released another DVD called Alice in Cartoonland: The 35mm Collector's Set. In 2005 and again in 2007, ten shorts in the series were released as part of the Walt Disney Treasures series. Seven were part of the Disney Rarities that was released in 2005, while three more were released as part of The Adventures of Oswald the Lucky Rabbit, released in 2007.

In 2016, Alice shorts held by the EYE Film Institute in Amsterdam were restored for global re-release.

A total of 16 Alice Comedies shorts are thought to be lost, and 1 Alice Comedies short (Alice's Auto Race) has been partially found.

#	Title	Release date	Actress	Status or DVD release(s)	Notes
1	Alice's Wonderland	N/A	Virginia Davis	Walt Disney Treasures: Disney Rarities: Celebrated Shorts, 1920s–1960s; Special "Un-Anniversary" Edition of Alice in Wonderland	
2	Alice's Day at Sea	March 1, 1924	Virginia Davis		
3	Alice's Spooky Adventure	April 1, 1924	Virginia Davis		
4	Alice's Wild West Show	May 1, 1924	Virginia Davis	Walt Disney Treasures: Disney Rarities: Celebrated Shorts, 1920s–1960s	
5	Alice's Fishy Story	June 1, 1924	Virginia Davis		
6	Alice and the Dog Catcher	July 1, 1924	Virginia Davis		
7	Alice the Peacemaker	August 1, 1924	Virginia Davis		
8	Alice Gets in Dutch	November 1, 1924	Virginia Davis	Walt Disney Treasures: Disney Rarities: Celebrated Shorts, 1920s–1960s	
9	Alice Hunting in Africa	November 15, 1924	Virginia Davis		
10	Alice and the Three Bears	December 1, 1924	Virginia Davis		
11	Alice the Piper	December 15, 1924	Virginia Davis		
12	Alice Cans the Cannibals	January 1, 1925	Virginia Davis	A copy with added music was uploaded to the Cult Cinema Classics YouTube channel on April 14, 2024.	
13	Alice the Toreador	January 15, 1925	Virginia Davis	Alice in Cartoonland – The Original Alice Comedies by Walt Disney	
14	Alice Gets Stung	February 1, 1925	Virginia Davis	Walt Disney Treasures: The Adventures of Oswald the Lucky Rabbit	Sound version released October 15, 1930
15	Alice Solves the Puzzle	February 15, 1925	Margie Gay	Alice in Cartoonland – The Original Alice Comedies by Walt Disney	The first appearance of what would become Pete.; Sound version released April 15, 1931
16	Alice's Egg Plant	May 30, 1925	Dawn O'Day	Walt Disney Treasures: Disney Rarities: Celebrated Shorts, 1920s–1960s	The first named appearance of Julius the Cat; Sound version released December 1, 1930
17	Alice Loses Out	June 15, 1925	Margie Gay		Sound version released March 1, 1931
18	Alice Gets Stage Struck	June 30, 1925	Margie Gay	Alice in Cartoonland – The Original Alice Comedies by Walt Disney	Sound version released January 15, 1931
19	Alice Wins the Derby	July 15, 1925	Margie Gay	Alice in Cartoonland – The Original Alice Comedies by Walt Disney	Sound version released November 15, 1930
20	Alice Picks the Champ	July 30, 1925	Margie Gay	Formerly lost	Sound version released March 15, 1931
21	Alice's Tin Pony	August 15, 1925	Margie Gay	Alice in Cartoonland – 35 mm Collector's Set	Sound version released September 15, 1930
22	Alice Chops the Suey	August 30, 1925	Margie Gay	Alice in Cartoonland – 35 mm Collector's Set	Sound version released February 1, 1931
23	Alice the Jail Bird	September 15, 1925	Margie Gay	Alice in Cartoonland – 35 mm Collector's Set	Sound version released November 1, 1930
24	Alice Plays Cupid	October 15, 1925	Margie Gay	Formerly lost	Sound version released April 1, 1931
25	Alice Rattled by Rats	November 15, 1925	Margie Gay	Alice in Cartoonland – The Original Alice Comedies by Walt Disney; Technicolor Dreams - And Black & White Nightmares	Sound version released May 1, 1931
26	Alice in the Jungle	December 15, 1925	Virginia Davis	Walt Disney Treasures: Disney Rarities: Celebrated Shorts, 1920s–1960s	Sound version released January 1, 1931
27	Alice on the Farm	January 1, 1926	Margie Gay	Alice in Cartoonland – The Original Alice Comedies by Walt Disney	Sound version released October 1, 1930
28	Alice's Balloon Race	January 15, 1926	Margie Gay	Walt Disney Treasures: The Adventures of Oswald the Lucky Rabbit	Sound version released December 15, 1930
29	Alice's Orphan	January 15, 1926	Margie Gay	Alice in Cartoonland – The Original Alice Comedies by Walt Disney	Sound version released February 15, 1931
30	Alice's Little Parade	February 1, 1926	Margie Gay	A copy was uploaded to the Cult Cinema Classics YouTube channel on June 9, 2024.	Sound version released September 1, 1930
31	Alice's Mysterious Mystery	February 15, 1926	Margie Gay	Walt Disney Treasures: Disney Rarities: Celebrated Shorts, 1920s–1960s	Sound version released May 15, 1931
32	Alice Charms the Fish	September 6, 1926	Margie Gay	Lost cartoon	First Alice Comedies short to be distributed by the Film Booking Offices of America.
33	Alice's Monkey Business	September 20, 1926	Margie Gay	Lost cartoon	
34	Alice in the Wooly West	October 4, 1926	Margie Gay	Walt Disney Treasures: The Adventures of Oswald the Lucky Rabbit	
35	Alice the Fire Fighter	October 18, 1926	Margie Gay		
36	Alice Cuts the Ice	November 1, 1926	Margie Gay	Lost cartoon	
37	Alice Helps the Romance	November 15, 1926	Margie Gay	Formerly lost	
38	Alice's Spanish Guitar	November 29, 1926	Margie Gay		
39	Alice's Brown Derby	December 13, 1926	Margie Gay		
40	Alice the LumberJack	December 27, 1926	Margie Gay	Lost cartoon	
41	Alice the Golf Bug	January 10, 1927	Margie Gay	Lost cartoon	
42	Alice Foils the Pirates	January 24, 1927	Margie Gay	Lost cartoon	
43	Alice at the Carnival	February 10, 1927	Margie Gay	Lost cartoon	
44	Alice at the Rodeo	February 21, 1927	Margie Gay	Formerly lost	
45	Alice the Collegiate	March 7, 1927	Margie Gay	Lost cartoon	
46	Alice in the Alps	March 21, 1927	Margie Gay	Lost cartoon	
47	Alice's Auto Race	April 4, 1927	Margie Gay	Partially lost cartoon	
48	Alice's Circus Daze	April 18, 1927	Lois Hardwick	Formerly lost	
49	Alice's Knaughty Knight	May 2, 1927	Lois Hardwick	Lost cartoon	
50	Alice's Three Bad Eggs	May 16, 1927	Lois Hardwick	Lost cartoon	
51	Alice's Picnic	May 30, 1927	Lois Hardwick	Lost cartoon	
52	Alice's Channel Swim	June 13, 1927	Lois Hardwick	Lost cartoon	
53	Alice in the Klondike	June 27, 1927	Lois Hardwick	Lost cartoon	
54	Alice's Medicine Show	July 11, 1927	Lois Hardwick	Lost cartoon	
55	Alice the Whaler	July 25, 1927	Lois Hardwick	Walt Disney Treasures: Disney Rarities: Celebrated Shorts, 1920s–1960s	
56	Alice the Beach Nut	August 8, 1927	Lois Hardwick	Lost cartoon	Final appearance of Julius the Cat.
57	Alice in the Big League	August 22, 1927	Lois Hardwick		Final appearance of Pete in the Alice Comedies.; Final Alice Comedies short to be distributed by the Film Booking Offices of America.; Final Alice Comedies short overall.

== See also ==
- Animation in the United States during the silent era
- Oswald the Lucky Rabbit
