= Live-action animation =

Film genre combining live-action and animated elements

Alice Comedies (1923), featuring live actress Virginia Davis interacting with an animated world

Live-action animation is a film genre that combines live-action filmmaking with animation. Films that use live action with traditional animation tend to use hand-drawn or stop-motion animation. Projects that use both live action and computer animation tend to use motion capture to translate performances by living actors into computer-generated imagery.

== History ==
=== Origins of combining live-action and animation ===
The origins of live-action animation date back to the early 20th century, with pioneers such as the Frenchman Georges Méliès. Méliès is often credited with creating the first examples of this genre through his innovative use of special effects, animation, and live-action footage. His 1902 film, A Trip to the Moon, although not a live-action animated film by the modern definition, laid the groundwork for the integration of imaginative elements into live-action films.

The genre really began to develop with the advent of techniques such as Rotoscoping, developed by Max Fleischer in the 1910s. Rotoscoping allowed animators to trace moving images, frame by frame, to generate realistic animations which could be integrated with real action scenes.

During the silent film era in the 1920s and 1930s, the popular animated cartoons of Max Fleischer included a series in which his cartoon character, Koko the Clown, interacted with the live world; for example, having a boxing match with a live kitten. In a variation from this and inspired by Fleischer, Walt Disney's first directorial efforts, years before Oswald the Lucky Rabbit was born in 1927 and Mickey Mouse in 1928, were the live-action animated Alice Comedies cartoons, in which a young live-action girl named Alice interacted with animated cartoon characters.

Many previous films have combined live-action with stop-motion animation using back projection, such as Willis O'Brien and Ray Harryhausen films in the United States, and Aleksandr Ptushko, Karel Zeman and, more recently, Jan Švankmajer in Eastern Europe. The first feature film combining these forms was The Lost World (1925). In the Soviet film The New Gulliver (1935), the only character who was not animated was Gulliver himself.

Warner Bros.' black-and-white Looney Tunes cartoon You Ought to Be in Pictures, directed by Friz Freleng, featured animated Warner Bros. characters interacting with live-action people, and the genre broke new ground for the first time and paved the way for future films that also used this technique.

In another cartoon, the animated sequence in the 1945 film Anchors Aweigh, in which Gene Kelly dances with an animated Jerry Mouse, is one of the most famous scenes in film history.

=== Development of live-action/animated feature films by Disney ===
Throughout the decades, Disney experimented with mixed segments of live-action and animation in several notable films, which are primarily considered live-action. In the Latin American film pair Saludos Amigos (1942) and The Three Caballeros (1944), Donald Duck cavorts with several Latin-American dancers, plus Aurora Miranda (sister of Carmen Miranda), who gives him a kiss. In Song of the South (1946) Uncle Remus sings "Zip-a-Dee-Doo-Dah" in an animated field, and tells the stories of Brer Rabbit through animated sequences. So Dear to My Heart (1948) improved upon this.

The 1964 film Mary Poppins gained significant notoriety for its blend of live action and animation, with an extensive sequence located "inside" a street painting, including Dick Van Dyke dancing with penguin waiters. In 1971 Bedknobs and Broomsticks transported Angela Lansbury and David Tomlinson to an underwater nightclub for dancing, followed by Tomlinson competing with anthropomorphic animals in an aggressive soccer match.

Inspired by the Swedish film Dunderklumpen! (1974), Walt Disney Productions produced Pete's Dragon in 1977 to experiment with similar techniques, placing the animated dragon, Elliot, in a live-action setting.

The genre broke new ground again with Who Framed Roger Rabbit in 1988, with Disney and Amblin Entertainment producing advanced special effects and photo-realistic interactions among animated characters and live actors. Memorable moments include the entrance of Jessica Rabbit in the Ink & Paint Club and Bob Hoskins handcuffed to the animated title character.

== Exceptions ==
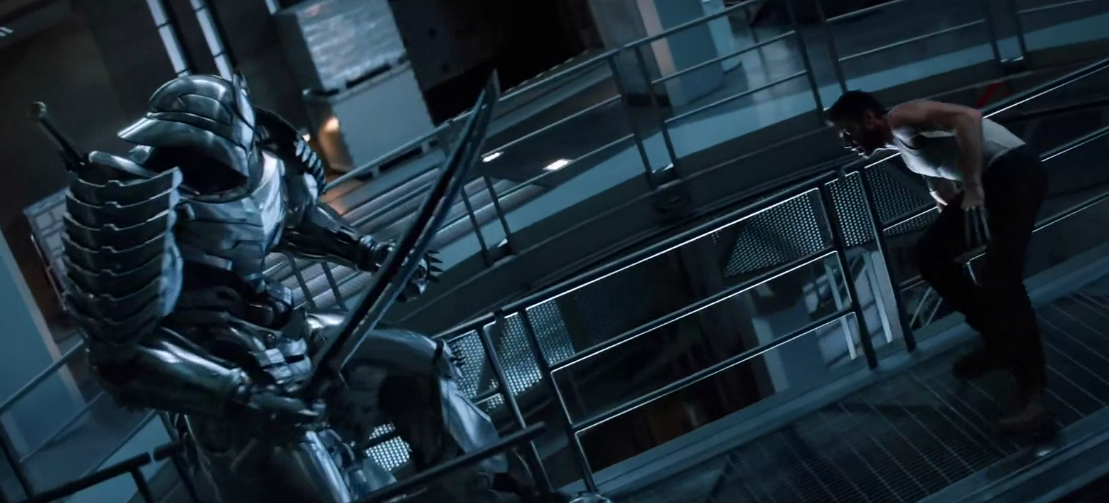
Live-action films that make use of photorealistic computer-assisted imagery (such as this scene from The Wolverine) are typically not considered to be animated.

Since the late 1990s, some films have included large amounts of photorealistic computer animation alongside live-action filmmaking, such as the Star Wars prequels, The Lord of the Rings trilogy and the Avatar franchise. These films are generally not considered animated due to the realism of the animation and the use of motion-capture performances, which are extensively based on live-action performances by implementing actors' movements and facial expressions into their characters. Roger Ebert said that "in my mind, it isn't animation, unless it looks like animation."

== See also ==
- List of films with live action and animation
- List of highest-grossing live-action/animated films
