= Virginia Davis =

American actress (1918–2009)

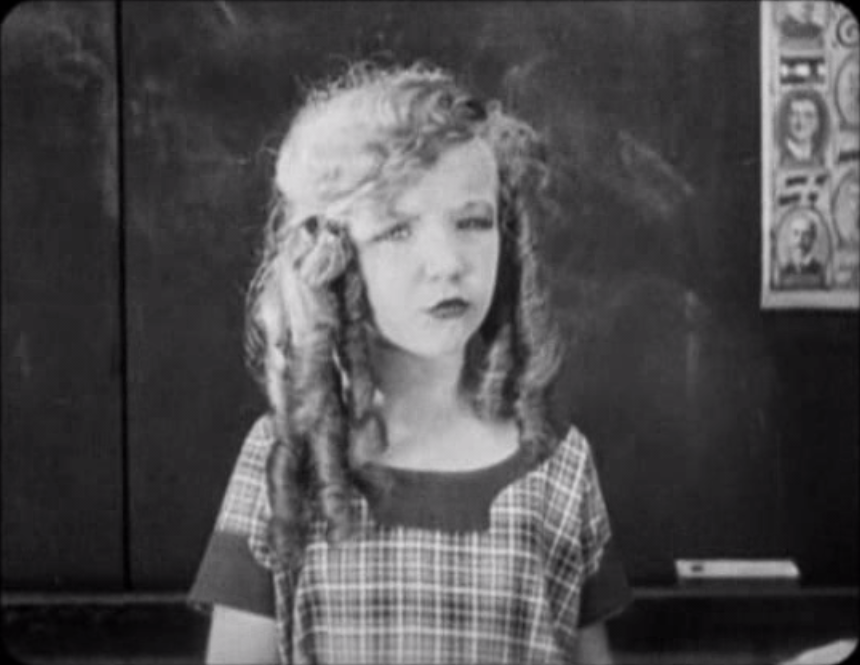
- Davis in 1924
- Born: December 31, 1918; Kansas City, Missouri, U.S.
- Died: August 15, 2009 (aged 90); Corona, California, U.S.
- Burial place: Holy Cross Cemetery, Culver City
- Occupation: Actress
- Years active: 1923–1946
- Spouse: Robert McGhee (m. 1943; died 2002)
- Children: 2
- Awards: Disney Legends (1998)

Virginia Davis (December 31, 1918 – August 15, 2009) was an American actress. She was best known for working with Walt Disney and Ub Iwerks on the animated short series Alice Comedies, in which she portrayed the protagonist, Alice.

== Life and career ==
Davis was born on December 31, 1918, in Kansas City, Missouri. Her father, a furniture salesman, was often away on business.

Several scenes of Virginia Davis in the 1923 film Alice's Wonderland

=== Alice Comedies ===
Davis began working for Walt Disney's Kansas City company, Laugh-O-Gram Studio, in 1923. She was hired to act in a film called Alice's Wonderland, which combined live action with animation. When Laugh-O-Gram failed and Disney moved to Los Angeles, on the basis of Alice's Wonderland Winkler Pictures signed Disney for a series known as the Alice Comedies, or Alice in Cartoonland. Disney convinced Davis' family to bring her from Missouri to Los Angeles to star in the series. During this time, Davis resided at the La Brea Apartments in Hollywood, California.

=== The Greater Glory ===
In 1925, Davis played the role of Resi in The Greater Glory, a First National Pictures production. The film's director, Curt Rehfeld, remarked that Davis "... has the technique of a finished artist, the unusual ability to follow direction and the disposition of an angel. Not once during the picture was it necessary for me to explain any angle twice and, with all of her mature understanding, the youthful charm still remains, making a rare and appreciated combination."

While filming The Greater Glory, Davis signed a contract with Harry Carey and the two actors worked together in The Man From Red Gulch (1925).

=== The Blue Bird ===
In December 1929, Davis was in the cast of The Blue Bird at the Pasadena Playhouse. The fairy play included Janet Horning, a child actress who was only two years old. The cast included 150 children.

== Retirement ==
Recalling her work on the Alice Comedies, Davis said, "It was a great time – full of fun, adventure, and 'let's pretend.' I adored and idolized Walt, as any child would. He would direct me in a large manner with great sweeping gestures. One of my favorite pictures was Alice's Wild West Show. I was always the kid with the curls, but I was really a tomboy, and that picture allowed me to act tough. I took great joy in that."

Over the next 20 years, she went on to work at other Hollywood studios as a child actress and, later, as a supporting actress. She sang, danced, and acted in such films as Flying Down to Rio (1933), Young and Beautiful (1934), College Holiday (1936), Vivacious Lady (1938), Three on a Match (1932), Week-End in Havana (1941), Song of the Islands (1942) and The Harvey Girls (1946) among others. On several occasions, she used the screen name Mary Daily, and appeared in such films as Hands Across the Rockies (1941) with cowboy star Bill Elliott. During her Hollywood tenure, she also occasionally worked for her old boss, Walt Disney, did a vocal test for Snow White, voiced some supporting characters in Pinocchio and served a short stint in the Disney Studio's Ink-and-Paint department.

== Personal life and death ==
In 1943, she married Navy aviator Robert McGhee, and the couple had two daughters. During their 59-year marriage, they resided in New Jersey, Connecticut, Southern California, and Idaho. Over a 25-year period, Davis worked as a real estate agent mostly in the Irvine, California and Boise, Idaho areas.

After a year of failing health, Davis-McGhee died at her home in Corona, California, on August 15, 2009, at the age of 90.

== Awards ==
In 1998, Davis received a Disney Legends award for Animation.

== Partial filmography ==
| Year | Title | Role | Notes |
|---|---|---|---|
| 1925 | The Dark Angel | Flower Girl | Uncredited |
| 1925 | The Man from Red Gulch | Cissy Falloner | |
| 1926 | The Greater Glory | Resi | |
| 1931 | Street Scene | Mary Hildebrand | Uncredited |
| 1932 | Three on a Match | Mary Keaton as a Child | |
| 1934 | Murder at the Vanities | Earl Carroll Girl | Uncredited |
| 1936 | College Holiday | Dancer | Uncredited |
| 1941 | You'll Never Get Rich | Chorus Girl | Uncredited |
| 1941 | Week-End in Havana | Dancer | Uncredited |
| 1942 | Song of the Islands | Islander | Uncredited |
| 1942 | My Gal Sal | Minor Role | Uncredited |
| 1942 | Footlight Serenade | Chorus Girl | Uncredited |
| 1942 | Iceland | Dancer | Uncredited |
| 1946 | The Harvey Girls | Harvey Girl | Uncredited (final film role) |
