= Margaret J. Winkler =

American film producer (1895–1990)

- Born: Margaret Winkler; April 22, 1895; Hungary, Austria-Hungary
- Died: June 21, 1990 (aged 95); Mamaroneck, New York, U.S.
- Occupations: Film studio executive; producer; distributor; animator
- Known for: Founding Winkler Productions
- Spouse: Charles B. Mintz (m. 1923; died 1939)

Margaret Winkler Mintz, known professionally as Margaret J. Winkler or M.J. Winkler (April 22, 1895 – June 21, 1990), was an American film producer and distributor. A major figure in American animation history, Winkler is best known for founding the animation studio and distribution company Screen Gems, distributing the early silent animated short films of Max and Dave Fleischer (Out of the Inkwell), Pat Sullivan and Otto Messmer (Felix the Cat), as well as producing Walt Disney and Ub Iwerks' Alice Comedies. playing a crucial role in each of their histories. She was the first woman to distribute animated films, and to produce them as well. After marrying fellow film executive Charles Mintz and starting a family, Winkler retired from the film industry.

== Early life ==
Born April 22, 1895 in Austria-Hungary, Margaret Winkler immigrated with her family to the United States as a child. Her brother George Winkler helped her get started in the field of film producing.

== Career ==
Winkler began her career as the personal secretary of Harry Warner, one of the founders and then-leader of Warner Bros. Pictures. Through most of the silent era, Warner Bros. was strictly a film distributor, and Harry Warner, as president, made the distribution deals. In 1917, Warner Bros. began distributing animated cartoon short films featuring Mutt and Jeff in New York and New Jersey. Warner was impressed with Winkler's talents.

In 1921, animation producer Pat Sullivan approached Warner, seeking distribution for his new Felix the Cat cartoon shorts. Wanting to withdraw from distributing cartoon shorts (at the time experiencing a lull in popularity), Warner, who disliked cartoons but was impressed by Winkler's competence, encouraged her to start her own company and distribute Sullivan's series. Winkler founded M.J. Winkler Productions. As one of the few women executives in the film industry, Winkler named her company - and signed her name - as "M.J. Winkler" to disguise her gender. Lacking a middle name, she'd added the "J" initial for professional use.

In 1922, Winkler signed with Pat Sullivan Productions to distribute the Felix the Cat cartoons. The following year, she signed another contract to distribute the Out of the Inkwell series for Max and Dave Fleischer's Inkwell Studios. This established her reputation as the top distributor in the cartoon world. Emulating how Warner Bros. had functioned during her time there, Winkler sold her films on a state-rights basis: as opposed to working with dedicated distribution representatives, Winkler worked with independent distributors within various states and regions to secure theater bookings for the cartoons. By the end of 1923, the Fleischer brothers, flush with success as a result of Winkler's work, left her to form their own distribution company, Red Seal Pictures.

However much Sullivan helped Winkler's business, he and Winkler were constantly fighting. In September 1923, the renewal of his contract came up, and his unrealistic demands meant M.J. Winkler Pictures might have to survive for a while without its biggest star. Winkler viewed a pilot reel, called Alice's Wonderland (1923), submitted by then neophyte Kansas City animator Walt Disney. Winkler was intrigued with the idea of a live-action girl in a cartoon world, and signed Disney in October 1923 to a year-long contract to produce an Alice Comedies series.

Walt Disney did not inform Winkler that Laugh-O-Gram Studio, where he had made Alice's Wonderland, was now bankrupt, and Disney had moved to Los Angeles. He instead quickly formed a new studio, Disney Brothers Cartoon Studio, with his brother Roy, and recruited his Laugh-O-Grams partner Ub Iwerks and many of their animators - Hugh Harman, Rudolf Ising, Carman Maxwell, and Isadore "Friz" Freleng - to come to Hollywood and work for them. Disney Brothers was the first cartoon studio in Hollywood and eventually changed its name to Walt Disney Productions. Disney was helped by the tutelage of Winkler, who insisted on editing all of the Alice Comedies herself. One of her suggestions was the addition of a suspiciously Felix-like anthropomorphic cat character called Julius. This was apparently the "straw that broke the camel's back" for Sullivan, who parted company with Winkler and signed with rival distributor E. W. Hammons of Educational Pictures in 1925. In 1925, she began self-producing a series of Krazy Kat cartoons with Bill Nolan as the creative producer/director.

In November 1923, Winkler married Charles Mintz, a film distributor who had been working for her since 1922. By the time of their marriage, both Mintz and Margaret Winkler's brother George Winkler were company directors at M.J. Winkler Productions. Soon after she had her first child and retired from the business, Margaret Winkler retired from the film business and fully turned her company over to Mintz. Mintz renamed it Winkler Pictures in 1925, as the name had been used for branding purposes since early 1924.

Charles Mintz would continue running the business, breaking in 1928 with Disney. In 1930, Mintz and Winkler moved their family to California, where Mintz reincorporated Winkler Pictures and the relocated Krazy Kat studio as the Charles Mintz Studio. The Mintz studio produced cartoon shorts series, primarily for Columbia Pictures, which included Krazy Kat, Scrappy, and the Color Rhapsodies. To resolve debts, the Mintz studio was acquired in pieces during the 1930s by Columbia and became known as Screen Gems. Mintz died in December 1939, and Screen Gems continued producing cartoons for Columbia, most notably The Fox and the Crow, until 1946.

== Personal life ==
Winkler and Mintz had two children, Katherine and William.

Winkler died on 21 June 1990, in Mamaroneck, New York at the age of 95.

== Filmography ==
| Year | Title | Role | Notes | Source |
|---|---|---|---|---|
| 1922 | Felix the Cat | Distributor | All Episodes | |
| 1922 | Out of the Inkwell | Distributor | | |
| 1923 | Alice Comedies | Distributor | | |

== Sources ==
- John Canemaker; Felix: The Twisted Tale of the World's Most Famous Cat; Pantheon Books; ISBN 0-679-40127-X (1991)
- Donald Crafton; Before Mickey: The Animated Film, 1898–1928; University of Chicago Press; ISBN 0-226-11667-0 (2nd edition, paperback, 1993)
- Denis Gifford; American Animated Films: The Silent Era, 1897–1929; McFarland & Company; ISBN 0-89950-460-4 (library binding, 1990)
- Leonard Maltin; Of Mice and Magic: A History of American Animated Cartoons; Penguin Books; ISBN 0-452-25993-2 (1980, 1987)
- Russell Merritt and J. B. Kaufman; Walt in Wonderland: The Silent Films of Walt Disney; Johns Hopkins University Press; ISBN 0-8018-4907-1 (paperback, 1993)
- Mitenbuler, Reid (March 30, 2022). Wild Minds: The Artists and Rivalries that Inspired the Golden Age of Animation. Atlantic Monthly Press (published 2020). pp. PT71. ISBN 978-0-8021-4705-9.: "Winkler was also one of the few women in the industry with any real power or influence. Because she knew that some people were wary of doing business with a woman, she used the initials "M. J.," in "M. J. Winkler Productions," as a way of hiding her gender (The "J." in her initials had been made up since she didn't actually have a middle name)."
