= 1922 in animation =

Events in 1922 in animation.

== Films released ==
Drawing of Julius the Cat

- Unknown date:
  - Chemistry Lesson (United States)
  - Shuzhendong Chinese Typewriter (China)
- 26 January – The Farmer and the Ostrich (United States)
- February – Magic Boots (United States)
- 1 February – Felix Saves the Day (United States)
- 1 March – Felix at the Fair
- 1 April – Felix Makes Good (United States)
- 2 April – Die Grundlagen der Einsteinschen Relativitäts-Theorie (Germany)
- 1 May – Felix All at Sea (United States)
- 17 May – The Farmer and the Cat (United States)
- 1 June – Felix in Love (United States)
- 4 June – The Mad Locomotive (United States)
- 1 July – Felix in the Swim view (United States)
- 29 July – Little Red Riding Hood (United States)
- 1 August:
  - Felix Finds a Way (United States)
  - The Four Musicians of Bremen (United States)
- 1 September – Felix Gets Revenge view (United States)
- 4 September – Jack and the Beanstalk (United States)
- 12 September – Jack the Giant Killer (United States)
- 15 September – Felix Wakes Up (United States)
- 27 September – The Two of a Trade (United States)
- 1 October – Felix Minds the Kid view (United States)
- 5 October – Goldie Locks and the Three Bears (United States)
- 15 October – Felix Turns the Tide view (United States)
- 21 October – Felix Fifty-Fifty (United States)
- 26 October – Felix Comes Back (United States)
- 1 November – Felix on the Trail (United States)
- 3 November – Puss in Boots (United States)
- 15 November – Felix Lends a Hand view (United States)
- 1 December – Felix Gets Left (United States)
- 6 December:
  - Cinderella (United States)
  - Tommy Tucker's Tooth (United States)
- 15 December – Felix in the Bone Age view (United States)
- 17 December – Colonel Heeza Liar's Treasure Island (United States)

== Births ==
=== January ===
- January 17: Betty White, American actress and comedian (voice of Gretchen Claus in The Story of Santa Claus, Dorothy in The Lionhearts, Aunt Polly in Tom Sawyer, Sophie Hunter in The Wild Thornberrys, Delia, Dorothy and Ellen in King of the Hill, Grandmama in Higglytown Heroes, Yoshie in Ponyo, Dora and Grandma Sheila Martin in Glenn Martin, DDS, Mrs. Claus in Prep & Landing: Operation: Secret Santa, Agatha McLeish in Pound Puppies, Grammy Norma in The Lorax, Bitey White in Toy Story 4 and the Forky Asks a Question episode "What is Love?", Mrs. Sarah Vanderwhoozie in Trouble, Hestia in the Hercules episode "Hercules and the Tiff on Olympus", Granny in the Teacher's Pet episode "The Turkey That Came for Dinner", Mrs. Doolin in the Grim & Evil episode "Who Killed Who?", Gary's Mother in the Gary the Rat episode "This Is Not a Pipe", Grandma Wilson in the Father of the Pride episode "Donkey", Old Lady in the Mickey Mouse episode "New York Weenie", Beatrice in the SpongeBob SquarePants episode "Mall Girl Pearl", herself in The Simpsons episodes "Missionary: Impossible" and "Homerazzi", and the Family Guy episode "Peterotica"), (d. 2021).

=== February ===
- February 3: Joe Siracusa, American film and music editor (Popeye the Sailor, What's New, Mr. Magoo?, The Alvin Show, DePatie-Freleng Enterprises, Marvel Productions), (d. 2021).
- February 4: William Edward Phipps, American actor (voice of Prince Charming in Cinderella), (d. 2018).
- February 5: Joan Boocock Lee, English-American model, actress, and wife of Stan Lee (voice of Madame Web in Spider-Man, Miss Forbes in Fantastic Four), (d. 2017).
- February 8: Audrey Meadows, American actress (voice of Bea Simmons in The Simpsons episode "Old Money"), (d. 1996).
- February 9: Harry Hargreaves, English comics artist, illustrator and animator (Gaumont British, GoGo the Fox), (d. 2004).
- February 22: Elbert Tuganov, Estonian animator and film director (Little Peeter's Dream), (d. 2007).

=== March ===
- March 9: Lechosław Marszałek, Polish film and television director (Reksio, Bolek i Lolek, Studio Filmów Rysunkowych), (d. 1991).
- March 16: Zdeněk Liška, Czech composer (wrote music for the films of Jan Švankmajer and Karel Zeman), (d. 1983).
- March 20: Carl Reiner, American actor, comedian, film director, and screenwriter (voice of Maz in Globehunters: An Around the World in 80 Days Adventure, Sarmoti in Father of the Pride, Murray in The Cleveland Show, Carl Reinoceros in Toy Story 4, Larry in Duck Duck Goose, Santa Claus in The Penguins of Madagascar and Shimmer and Shine, Captain Treasure Tooth in Jake and the Never Land Pirates, Shazam in the Justice League Action episode "Classic Rock (Shazam Slam: Part 1)", Henry in the Bob's Burgers episode "Father of the Bob"), (d. 2020).

=== April ===
- April 4: Elmer Bernstein, American composer and conductor (Heavy Metal, The Black Cauldron), (d. 2004).
- April 8: Steve Gravers, American actor (voice of Blackwolf in Wizards), (d. 1978).
- April 10: Marian Richman, American actress (voice of Melissa Duck in The Scarlet Pumpernickel, Ralph Phillips' teacher in From A to Z-Z-Z-Z), (d. 1956).
- April 15: Michael Ansara, American actor (voice of Mr. Freeze in the DC Animated Universe, General Warhawk in Rambo: The Force of Freedom, Vashtar in the Thundarr the Barbarian episode "Prophecy of Peril", Hiawatha Smith in the Spider-Man and His Amazing Friends episode "Quest of the Red Skull"), (d. 2013).

=== May ===
- May 2:
  - Doug Wildey, American comics artist and animator (Jonny Quest), (d. 1994).
  - Roscoe Lee Browne, American actor (voice of Francis in Oliver & Company, Kingpin in Spider-Man, Mr. Arrow in Treasure Planet, Dr. Anokye in Static Shock, Max Miles in Ring Raiders, Reekon and Merklyn in Visionaries: Knights of the Magical Light, Great Mystic Gnome in the Freakazoid! episode "Lawn Gnomes: Chapter IV – Fun in the Sun", Clarence St. John in The Proud Family episode "Wedding Bell Blues", Edward Zeddmore in The Real Ghostbusters episode "The Brooklyn Triangle", Friar Ferdinand in the Happily Ever After: Fairy Tales for Every Child episode "Rumpelstiltskin"), (d. 2007).
- May 13:
  - Bea Arthur, American actress (voice of Femputer in the Futurama episode "Amazon Women in the Mood"), (d. 2009).
  - Lillian Adams, American actress (voice of Rosa in Heavy Traffic, Italian Woman in Hey Good Lookin'), (d. 2011).
- May 27: Christopher Lee, English actor (voice of King Haggard in The Last Unicorn, Pastor Galswells in Corpse Bride, Count Dooku in Star Wars: The Clone Wars), (d. 2015).
- May 31: Denholm Elliott, English actor (voice of Cowslip in Watership Down), (d. 1992).

=== June ===
- June 1: Joan Copeland, American actress (voice of Tanana in Brother Bear), (d. 2022).
- June 8: Paul Gringle, American comics artist, animator and illustrator (advertising film for Champion Spark Plugs), (d. 2012).
- June 10: Judy Garland, American actress and singer (voice of Mewsette in Gay Purr-ee), (d. 1969).
- June 11: Bernard Cowan, Canadian actor (voice of Bumble, Spotted Elephant, and Clarice's Father in Rudolph the Red-Nosed Reindeer, narrator in Spider-Man, The Marvel Super Heroes, and Rocket Robin Hood), (d. 1990).
- June 22: Sterling Sturtevant, American designer and art director (Walt Disney Animation Studios, UPA), (d. 1962).
- June 24: Jack Carter, American comedian, actor and television presenter (voice of Wilbur Cobb in The Ren & Stimpy Show, Irwin Linker in King of the Hill, Harry in the Superman: The Animated Series episode "Warrior Queen", Tiresias in the Hercules episode "Hercules and the Griffin", Ziff Twyman in the Pinky, Elmyra & the Brain episode "That's Edutainment", Frieda's Grandfather in the Static Shock episode "Frozen Out", Old Man in the Family Guy episode "Grumpy Old Man", Sid in the Justice League Unlimited episode "This Little Piggy"), (d. 2015).

=== July ===
- July 2: Abe Levitow, American animator (Warner Bros. Cartoons, MGM animation, UPA) and director (Mr. Magoo's Christmas Carol, The Phantom Tollbooth), (d. 1975).
- July 4: Charles Csuri, American artist and computer art pioneer, (d. 2022).
- July 6: William Schallert, American actor (narrator in Sparky's Magic Piano, voice of Professor Pomfrit and Farmer P./Neville Popenbacher in What's New, Scooby-Doo?, Appa Ali Apsa in Green Lantern: First Flight, Willem in The Smurfs episode "Tis the Season to Be Smurfy", Dr. Cahill in the Jumanji episode "The Plague", Dr. Cowtiki in The Angry Beavers episode "The Day the World Got Really Screwed Up", Judge Linden in The Zeta Project episode "The River Rising"), (d. 2016).
- July 21: Tobin Wolf, American writer (creator of ThunderCats), (d. 1999).
- July 26: Gérard Calvi, French composer (Astérix), (d. 2015).
- July 27: Norman Lear, American television producer (Channel Umptee-3) and writer (voice of Benjamin Franklin in the South Park episode "I'm a Little Bit Country", himself in The Simpsons episode "Mr. Lisa's Opus"), (d. 2023).
- July 31: José Castillo, Venezuelan animator (creator of Conejíto, the first animation in the history of Venezuela), (d. 2018).

=== August ===
- August 29: Arthur Anderson, American actor (voice of Eustace Bagge in seasons 3-4 of Courage the Cowardly Dog, original voice of Lucky the Leprechaun in Lucky Charms ads), (d. 2016).

=== September ===
- September 1: Cherie DeCastro, American singer (Bird and Animal voices in Song of the South), (d. 2010).
- September 2: Wolfgang Urchs, German director, screenwriter and animator (Janoschs Traumstunde, Stowaways on the Ark, Peter in Magicland, (d. 2016).
- September 4: Igor Podgorskiy, Russian animator, (d. 1975).
- September 8: Sid Caesar, American actor and writer (voice of King Goochi in Intergalactic Thanksgiving, Marty Kazoo in Life with Louie, Jacob in Globehunters: An Around the World in 80 Days Adventure), (d. 2014).
- September 9:
  - Hoyt Curtin, American composer (Hanna-Barbera), (d. 2000).
  - Imogene Lynn, American singer (singing voice of Red in Tex Avery's cartoons), (d. 2003).

=== October ===
- October 9: Fyvush Finkel, American actor (voice of the Narrator in The Real Shlemiel, Jackie the Schtickman in Aaahh!!! Real Monsters, Hearing Aid in The Brave Little Toaster Goes to Mars, Shlomo in the Rugrats episode "Chanukah", himself in The Simpsons episode "Lisa's Sax"), (d. 2016).
- October 15: Alfons Figueras, Spanish comic book artist and animator (MGM, RKO Radio Network, Hispano Graphic Films), (d. 2009).

=== November ===
- November 1: George S. Irving, American actor (narrator in Underdog, voice of Heat Miser in The Year Without a Santa Claus and Captain Contagious in Raggedy Ann and Andy: A Musical Adventure), (d. 2016).
- November 26: Charles M. Schulz, American cartoonist (creator of Peanuts), (d. 2000).
- November 29: Laurie Main, Australian actor (voice of Farmer Grey, Squire Douglas Gordon, and Pipe Smoking Stable Owner in Black Beauty, narrator in Winnie the Pooh Discovers the Seasons, and Winnie the Pooh and a Day for Eeyore, Dr. Watson in The Great Mouse Detective, additional voices in The Plastic Man Comedy Adventure Show, The New Yogi Bear Show, and Paddington Bear), (d. 2012).

=== December ===
- December 16: Phyllis Barnhart, American animator (Walt Disney Animation Studios, Filmation, Hanna-Barbera, Bandolier Films, Chuck Jones Productions, Murakami-Wolf-Swenson, DePatie-Freleng Enterprises, Sullivan Bluth Studios), (d. 2008).
- December 18: Larry D. Mann, Canadian actor (voice of Yukon Cornelius in Rudolph the Red-Nosed Reindeer), (d. 2014).
- December 21: Paul Winchell, American ventriloquist and actor (voice of Tigger in the Winnie the Pooh franchise, Dick Dastardly in Wacky Races and Dastardly and Muttley in Their Flying Machines, Shun Gon in The Aristocats, Gargamel in The Smurfs, Boomer in The Fox and the Hound, Zummi Gummi in Disney's Adventures of the Gummi Bears), (d. 2005).
- December 28: Stan Lee, American comics writer, editor and publisher (narrator in The Incredible Hulk and Spider-Man and His Amazing Friends, voice of Fred's dad in Big Hero 6 and Big Hero 6: The Series, the Mayor of Superhero City in The Super Hero Squad Show, Mayor Stan in Hulk and the Agents of S.M.A.S.H., Stan the janitor in Ultimate Spider-Man, himself in Teen Titans Go! To the Movies, The Simpsons episodes "I Am Furious (Yellow)", "The Caper Chase" and "Married to the Blob", and the Spider-Man episode "Farewell Spider-Man"), (d. 2018).
