= List of Disney animated films based on fairy tales =

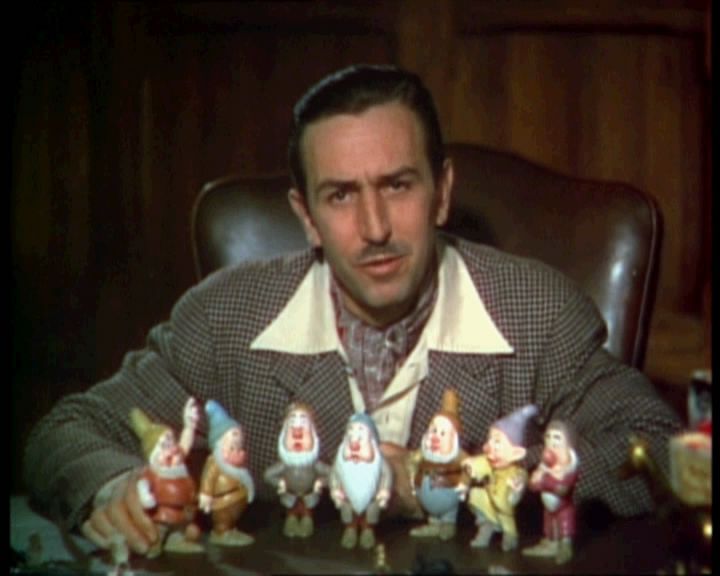
Walt Disney poses with statuettes of the Seven Dwarfs in the original theatrical trailer for Snow White and the Seven Dwarfs

Fairy tales have provided a significant source of inspiration for Disney studios, mainly Walt Disney Animation Studios. Sometimes, Walt Disney Pictures alters gruesome fairy tales in order to make them more appropriate for different age groups, specifically children and adults. The silent short cartoons produced at the Laugh-O-Gram Studio during Walt Disney's early career consisted of humorous, modern retellings of traditional stories. Later, Walt Disney and his studio turned to traditional fairy tales as the source for shorts in the Silly Symphony series, and later animated features such as Snow White and the Seven Dwarfs, his first full-length feature. After a hiatus from the fairy tale genre, the modern Disney company once more looked to classic fairy tales during the late 80s and 90s, resulting in popular films such as Aladdin, Mulan, The Little Mermaid and Beauty and the Beast. The following list is the examples of the fairy tale films which produced by the Disney company, along with their sources of inspiration (some stories, including Cinderella and The Ugly Duckling, have been subject to multiple treatments). Excluded are television series (such as The Little Mermaid TV series) and sequels to previous fairy tale films (such as Cinderella II: Dreams Come True), unless explicitly incorporating elements of another traditional story.

== Disney's animated shorts based on fairy tales ==
| Name of film | Year | Source material | Further notes |
|---|---|---|---|
| Little Red Riding Hood | 1922 | Little Red Riding Hood by Charles Perrault/Brothers Grimm | Laugh-O-Gram |
| The Four Musicians of Bremen | 1922 | The Bremen Town Musicians by the Brothers Grimm | Laugh-O-Gram |
| Jack and the Beanstalk | 1922 | Traditional English tale of Jack and the Beanstalk, best known through the retelling by Joseph Jacobs | Laugh-O-Gram |
| Jack the Giant Killer | 1922 | Traditional English tale of Jack the Giant Killer | Laugh-O-Gram, also released under the title of The KO Kid. |
| Goldie Locks and the Three Bears | 1922 | Goldilocks and the Three Bears by Robert Southey | Laugh-O-Gram, also released under the title of The Peroxide Kid. |
| Puss in Boots | 1922 | Puss in Boots by Charles Perrault | Laugh-O-Gram |
| Cinderella | 1922 | Cinderella by Charles Perrault/Brothers Grimm | Laugh-O-Gram |
| The Ugly Duckling | 1931 | The Ugly Duckling by Hans Christian Andersen | From the Silly Symphony series. The only such short in the series to be remade in colour. |
| Babes in the Woods | 1932 | Title taken from the traditional English tale Babes in the Wood, though largely inspired by the Brothers Grimm's Hansel and Gretel | From the Silly Symphony series. |
| Three Little Pigs | 1933 | Traditional English tale of The Three Little Pigs | From the Silly Symphony series. An extremely successful film, it introduced the Disney versions of the namesake pigs and the Big Bad Wolf, and bore the popular song "Who's Afraid of the Big Bad Wolf?". Winner of the Academy Award for Best Animated Short Film. |
| The Pied Piper | 1933 | German folk tale of The Pied Piper of Hamelin, popularised in the English-speaking world by the 19th century poem by Robert Browning | From the Silly Symphony series. |
| Giantland | 1933 | Loosely inspired by the traditional English tale of Jack and the Beanstalk, best known through the retelling by Joseph Jacobs | Mickey Mouse short. |
| The Grasshopper and the Ants | 1934 | The Ant and the Grasshopper by Aesop | From the Silly Symphony series. |
| The Big Bad Wolf | 1934 | Little Red Riding Hood by Charles Perrault/Brothers Grimm, featuring characters from Three Little Pigs | From the Silly Symphony series. Part sequel to Three Little Pigs, part retelling of Little Red Riding Hood. |
| The Wise Little Hen | 1934 | Traditional story of The Little Red Hen | From the Silly Symphony series. First screen appearance of Donald Duck. The duck character is not in the original fairy tale. |
| The Tortoise and the Hare | 1935 | The Tortoise and the Hare by Aesop | From the Silly Symphony series. |
| The Country Cousin | 1936 | The Town Mouse and the Country Mouse by Aesop | From the Silly Symphony series. |
| Brave Little Tailor | 1938 | The Brave Little Tailor by the Brothers Grimm | Mickey Mouse short. |
| The Ugly Duckling | 1939 | The Ugly Duckling by Hans Christian Andersen | From the Silly Symphonies series. Colour remake of the 1931 short. Winner of the Academy Award for Best Animated Short Film. |
| Chicken Little | 1943 | Traditional story of Chicken Little | World War II anti-Nazi propaganda. |
| Redux Riding Hood | 1997 | Little Red Riding Hood by Charles Perrault/Brothers Grimm | Produced by Walt Disney Television Animation as part of a planned series called "Totally Twisted Fairy Tales". |
| The Little Matchgirl | 2006 | The Little Match Girl by Hans Christian Andersen | Included on The Little Mermaid Platinum Edition DVD. Originally made for a third continuation of Fantasia that was ultimately shelved. |

== Disney feature films based on fairy tales ==
| Name of film | Year | Source material | Further notes |
|---|---|---|---|
| Snow White and the Seven Dwarfs | 1937 | Snow White by the Brothers Grimm | Walt Disney's first full-length animated feature film; it became the most successful sound film in motion-picture history up to that point. |
| Pinocchio | 1940 | The Adventures of Pinocchio by Carlo Collodi | |
| The Adventures of Ichabod and Mr. Toad | 1949 | The Wind in the Willows by Kenneth Grahame and The Legend of Sleepy Hollow by Washington Irving | All the segments are based on fairy tales. First segment an adaptation of classic English children's story by Kenneth Grahame and the second segment based on Washington Irving's gothic short story |
| Cinderella | 1950 | Cinderella by Charles Perrault | Walt Disney's comeback feature after a series of financial difficulties following World War II. |
| Alice in Wonderland | 1951 | Alice's Adventures in Wonderland and Through the Looking-Glass by Lewis Carroll | |
| Peter Pan | 1953 | Peter and Wendy by J. M. Barrie | |
| Sleeping Beauty | 1959 | Sleeping Beauty by Charles Perrault | The last fairy tale film produced by Walt Disney before his death; it is one of only two Disney animated films produced in a special 70mm widescreen process, the other one being The Black Cauldron. The film features heavily stylized art direction and music adapted from the Tchaikovsky ballet score. |
| The Sword in the Stone | 1963 | The legend of King Arthur and The Sword in the Stone by T.H. White | |
| The Jungle Book | 1967 | The Jungle Book by Rudyard Kipling | The first Disney animated movie after Walt Disney's death. |
| Robin Hood | 1973 | Adapted from the Medieval English folktale Robin Hood. | Despite being first Disney animated film to begin production after the death of Walt Disney, the film grossed over $33 million dollars worldwide and became the biggest box office hit in Disney history at the time of its release. |
| The Little Mermaid | 1989 | The Little Mermaid by Hans Christian Andersen | The first Disney animated fairy tale in 22 years, the critical and commercial success of The Little Mermaid resulted in a popular renewed interest in Disney animation. The story had been considered by Walt Disney as a potential segment for a planned film based on the life and works of Hans Christian Andersen. |
| DuckTales the Movie: Treasure of the Lost Lamp | 1990 | Elements from Aladdin from the Arabian Nights | Though largely a theatrical spin-off of the television series DuckTales, the film owes a lot of its plot to the story of Aladdin and the Wonderful Lamp, which would be produced as a feature film by Disney two years later. |
| Beauty and the Beast | 1991 | Beauty and the Beast by Jeanne-Marie Leprince de Beaumont | Even more successful than The Little Mermaid, Beauty and the Beast was the first animated feature ever to be nominated for a Best Picture Oscar. As with The Little Mermaid, it is said that the story had been considered for a film treatment during Walt Disney's lifetime. |
| Aladdin | 1992 | Aladdin from the Arabian Nights and Antoine Galland's interpretation | An even more resounding commercial success than its predecessors, the film also takes cues from such adventure films as The Thief of Bagdad and Raiders of the Lost Ark. |
| Mulan | 1998 | Traditional Chinese story of Hua Mulan | |
| The Emperor's New Groove | 2000 | A comedic play off of the story The Emperor's New Clothes by Hans Christian Andersen | |
| Chicken Little | 2005 | Loosely inspired on Chicken Little with a sci-fi twist | Disney’s second adaptation of "Chicken Little". Disney’s first non-Pixar film to be computer animated. Unrelated to the 1943 short. |
| The Princess and the Frog | 2009 | The Frog Prince by the Brothers Grimm and The Frog Princess by E.D. Baker | The first traditionally animated Disney film since the revival of the medium following a regime change in early 2006. Ditching a traditional European setting for New Orleans during the 1920s, the film gained much attention over the introduction of Disney's first ever black princess, Tiana. |
| Tangled | 2010 | Rapunzel by the Brothers Grimm | A computer-animated film released in 3D. Much controversy surrounded the decision to rename the film from the more traditional Rapunzel to Tangled in an attempt not to put off male audiences. Nevertheless, the film was a big success. |
| Frozen | 2013 | The Snow Queen by Hans Christian Andersen | A computer-animated film released in 3D. It also won the studio its first Best Animated Feature Oscar. It has since spawned a successful franchise that includes a television spin-off, a sequel, an album, two animated shorts, a musical and merchandise. |

=== Disney feature films containing segments based on fairy tales ===
| Name of film | Year | Segment name | Source material | Further notes |
|---|---|---|---|---|
| Fantasia | 1940 | "The Sorcerer's Apprentice" | Traditional German story of The Sorcerer's Apprentice, popularised in verse form by Goethe | Set to Paul Dukas' tone poem of the same name, featuring Mickey Mouse in an iconic sorcerer's outfit. Reprised for Fantasia 2000. |
| Make Mine Music | 1946 | "Peter and the Wolf" | Traditional Russian story of Peter and the Wolf by Sergei Prokofiev | Narrated by Sterling Holloway. |
| Fun and Fancy Free | 1947 | "Mickey and the Beanstalk" | Traditional English story of Jack and the Beanstalk, best known through the retelling by Joseph Jacobs | Originally planned as a feature film, monetary issues at the studio forced the film to be retooled as a shorter segment for a package feature. Narrated by Edgar Bergen, though individual releases of the short features narration by Sterling Holloway and/or Ludwig Von Drake. |
| Fantasia 2000 | 1999 | "The Steadfast Tin Soldier" | The Steadfast Tin Soldier by Hans Christian Andersen | The Steadfast Tin Soldier story, set to Shostakovich's' "Piano Concerto No. 2 in F major" had once been considered by the studio in the late 1930s. |
