= Martha (1923 film) =

1923 film by Walt Disney

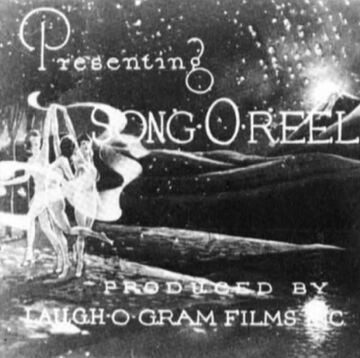
- Title card, only surviving image of the film
- Directed by: Walt Disney
- Story by: Walt Pfeiffer
- Produced by: Walt Disney
- Color process: Black and white
- Production company: Laugh-O-Grams
- Release date: 1923
- Running time: 15 minutes
- Country: United States
- Language: Silent film

Martha is a 1923 American silent live-action short film directed by Walt Disney. It was black and white, and billed as a "Song-O-Reel". It is the only film in the Laugh-O-Gram series that is presumed fully lost, as no prints are known to exist. The only image remaining is from the intro. Set photos from the production are a part of the UMKC University Libraries collection.

== Background and production ==
Martha was produced in early 1923 at the Laugh-O-Gram Studio, located on the second floor of the McConahay Building at 1127 E. 31st Street in Kansas City, Missouri. The film was directed and produced by Walt Disney during the final months of his Kansas City-based animation company, which was struggling financially and would declare bankruptcy by mid-1923. Unlike the previous Laugh-O-Gram fairy tale adaptations, Martha represented Disney's experimental foray into a new format designed to accompany popular music.
