= Belvedere Apartments =

Belvedere Apartments may refer to:

- Belvedere Apartments (Columbia, Missouri)
- Belvedere Apartments (Salt Lake City), listed on the National Register of Historic Places (NRHP) in Salt Lake City
