= DuckTales the Movie: Treasure of the Lost Lamp =

1990 American animated adventure film

- 1990 theatrical release poster by Drew Struzan
- Directed by: Bob Hathcock
- Screenplay by: Alan Burnett
- Based on: DuckTales by Jymn Magon
- Produced by: Bob Hathcock
- Starring: Alan Young; Terrence McGovern; Russi Taylor; Richard Libertini; Christopher Lloyd; June Foray; Chuck McCann; Joan Gerber; Rip Taylor
- Edited by: Charles King
- Music by: David Newman
- Production companies: Disney MovieToons; Walt Disney Television Animation
- Distributed by: Buena Vista Pictures Distribution (Note: Distributed through the Walt Disney Pictures banner.)
- Release date: August 3, 1990
- Running time: 73 minutes
- Country: United States
- Language: English
- Budget: $20 million
- Box office: $18.1 million

DuckTales the Movie: Treasure of the Lost Lamp (also known as DuckTales: The Movie) is a 1990 American animated adventure fantasy film based on the animated television series DuckTales and loosely based on the tale of Aladdin and the Wonderful Lamp. Produced and directed by Bob Hathcock and from a screenplay by Alan Burnett, the film features the series' cast of Alan Young, Terrence McGovern, Russi Taylor, and Chuck McCann, with Richard Libertini, Rip Taylor and Christopher Lloyd voicing new characters. The events of the film take place between the third and fourth seasons of DuckTales.

The film was released to theaters by Walt Disney Pictures on August 3, 1990, and marked the first time Disney distributed an animated film that was not produced by Walt Disney Feature Animation. It was the first Disney animated film to be produced by Walt Disney Television Animation under the banner of Disney MovieToons and animated by Walt Disney Animation France S.A. The film was paired with the 1951 Donald Duck short Dude Duck for its theatrical release. A comic book adaption was released at the same time, with a cover identical to the theatrical poster.

Although it received mixed to positive reviews from critics, the film underperformed at the box office, earning only $18.1 million on a $20 million budget, resulting in several planned DuckTales films being scrapped.

== Plot ==
Scrooge McDuck travels to the Middle East to inspect a recently discovered treasure chest he is certain contains the treasure of the great thief Collie Baba, accompanied by Huey, Dewey and Louie, Webby Vanderquack, and Launchpad McQuack. Although initially disappointed when the chest seems to contain only old clothes, Scrooge is excited when an ancient treasure map is found in the pocket of an old robe. Guided by the thief Dijon, they set out to find the lost treasure, unaware that Dijon actually works for the evil sorcerer Merlock, who desires something Collie Baba owned. The group discovers Collie Baba's treasure in a sand-covered pyramid. Webby sees a lamp in the treasure, which Scrooge lets her keep since it does not retain any value.

After packing up the treasure for transport, Scrooge and his group are trapped in a room full of monstrous scorpions by Merlock and Dijon, who steal the treasure. However, Merlock discovers that the lamp has been stolen; he drags Dijon with him to locate it. Scrooge and his friends manage to escape from the pyramid and, with nothing more than Webby's lamp, depart for Duckburg.

Days later, the children discover the lamp holds a Genie. Ecstatic about his freedom, the Genie grants the four children 3 wishes each; to trick Scrooge, he poses as the boys' Woodchuck scout friend Gene. Using the lamp's powers irresponsibly, their wishes include a baby elephant (which runs amok through Scrooge's mansion) and a giant ice cream sundae, among other things. Fearful of a bird flying by at night, Genie tells them about Merlock, who used his wishes for eternal life and the destruction of Atlantis and Pompeii, which were both popular vacation spots; Merlock's magic talisman, which allows him to take various animal forms, also overrides the lamp's rules, granting him unlimited wishes. Collie Baba stole the lamp from Merlock and hid it away with his treasure, and Merlock has spent the centuries since searching for it. The children suggest that they wish for the talisman, but Genie says that this is the only wish he is unable to grant, leading them to one and only option steal it from Merlock. They must prevent Merlock from obtaining the lamp or the world will suffer.

The next day, Webby uses her last foolish wish to bring all her toys to life, which forces the children to reveal Genie's true identity to Scrooge. Wishing to impress the Archeological Society at their annual ball, Scrooge wishes for the treasure of Collie Baba, and brings the lamp and Genie with him to the ball. He is followed by Merlock and Dijon, who ambush Scrooge. In the ensuing struggle, Scrooge mistakes a gravy boat for the lamp and leaves the lamp and Genie behind, after which they both fall into the hands of Dijon, who is convinced by Genie to keep the lamp instead of giving it to Merlock.

Having wished for Scrooge's fortune, Dijon takes possession of the Money Bin and other properties and has Scrooge arrested for trespassing. However, Scrooge is immediately bailed out by Launchpad, his nephews, Webby, Mrs. Beakley and Duckworth, who agree to help Scrooge set things right. Scrooge, the nephews and Webby infiltrate the Money Bin in an attempt to steal the lamp, but are stopped by Merlock, who recovers the lamp. With Genie under his control again, Merlock wishes for Dijon to be turned into a pig for his disloyalty and then for the Money Bin to become a fortress, which flies into the air high above Duckburg. When an indignant Scrooge threatens him, Merlock wishes him "out of his house", and Genie reluctantly raises the wind to send Scrooge to the edge of the fortress, hanging on for dear life. The nephews use a slingshot to knock the lamp out of Merlock's hands, tossing it to Scrooge, who loses his grip and falls towards the Earth. Merlock recovers his talisman and pursues as a griffin, grappling with Scrooge in the air, but Scrooge knocks the talisman from Merlock's hand, turning the sorcerer back to normal as he falls to his death. Recovering the lamp, Scrooge uses his second wish to return himself, his family, and his Money Bin back to Duckburg.

Back in the Money Bin, Scrooge declares that he has had "enough of all this wishing" and threatens to use his final wish to bury the lamp where it would never be found again. After Genie and the children protest, he instead wishes for Genie to become a real boy. Without Genie, the lamp disintegrates and crumbles to dust, and thus removing its magic forever. While the children play with their newest friend, Scrooge discovers Dijon, recovered from Merlock's wish, stuffing his trousers with his money. Scrooge chases him outside and down the street while yelling "Somebody, stop those pants!"

== Voice cast ==
- Alan Young as Scrooge McDuck
- Russi Taylor as Huey Duck, Dewey Duck, Louie Duck, and Webby Vanderquack
- Terrence McGovern as Launchpad McQuack
- Richard Libertini as the thief Dijon
- Christopher Lloyd as the sorcerer Merlock
- June Foray as Mrs. Featherby
- Chuck McCann as Duckworth
- Joan Gerber as Mrs. Beakley
- Rip Taylor as Genie

== Production ==
Animator Larry Ruppel shared his experience during the film's production:

I was the sole American working at the Paris studio during this production, the other creative artists hailing mostly from France, Denmark, Australia and Italy. As the only American on staff, there were many occasions when I had to explain to supervisors or other animators the exact meaning of some American slang phrases used in the dialogue of the script. I'd like to add that this little movie ended up being quite important because of the many notable animation professionals who got their start on this project. Besides myself (I've animated numerous Disney projects, also Classic Warner Bros. shorts), there are, among others, DreamWorks animators Sylvain Deboissy and Nicholas Marlet, French animation director Pierre Lyphoudt, and ILM's James Baker and Daniel Jeannette. For all the Europeans working on this Disney feature, it was a dream come true, and because most of us were working on a feature for the first time in our lives, in a way it was our Snow White.

Director/producer Bob Hathcock revealed in an interview that the film began as a five-part episode for the TV series, adding: "Our first idea was to see if there was a way to release that as a feature." An initial treatment for the film centered on the search for the Philosopher's stone, but the idea was later dropped. Due to the success of Who Framed Roger Rabbit (1988), several animators who worked on the film were stationed at Disney's newly founded London studio and another location was established in Paris (under the supervision of Paul and Gaëtan Brizzi). The Disney studio in Burbank designed the characters and storyboards, then the materials were sent to Europe. Hathcock spent most of his time between London and Paris, while ink/paint/camera work was done in China, and additional work in Spain. The film was the last Disney feature to use cel-animation, but also one of the firsts to utilize computer animation.

The initial voice-overs took one year, and another six months were spent on re-takes, and although Alan Young had never worked with Christopher Lloyd or Rip Taylor before, he said he would "'sit there in awe' watching them at work." In addition to working with Alan Young and Russi Taylor, Rip Taylor spent three six-hour stints by himself to record new lines, and at one point even phoned in some of his lines: "I was in Atlantic City ... when they called me and said they needed to change some dialogue ... I found a phone in a radio studio and phoned in six or seven pages of dialogue. I had to do it seven times ... because they kept changing the dialogue."

During the film's opening credits, the title's typeface is similar to that of the Indiana Jones films. Another homage to the Indiana Jones films comes later in the movie when someone looking like Indiana Jones can be seen briefly when Scrooge and Genie visit the Explorer's Club. These references to Indiana Jones were thanks to Gary Krisel, then president of Disney Television Animation, who had an "obsessive fascination" with the series.

== Release ==
The film was released in theatres in North America on August 3, 1990.

The Japanese dub has the song Voice Field by Poplar as the theme song.

=== Box office ===
With a gross of $18.1 million on a $20 million budget, the film was not a financial success, having to face competition from other summer releases such as Jetsons: The Movie, though the latter also underperformed at the box office. The film's initial theatrical release was accompanied by the Donald Duck short Dude Duck.

=== Critical reception ===
The film received generally mixed to positive reviews since its original release.

Common Sense Media rated the movie a three out of five stars. Chris Hicks of Deseret News claimed he went in "with very low expectations ... I was pleasantly surprised at how clever and funny the film is." Reviewing it for TV, ABC's Joel Siegel said: "Here is a movie you can take the kids to you'll all enjoy." Variety called the film a "lushly animated, smartly scripted, wise-quacking adventure."

Detractors included Richard Harrington of The Washington Post, who criticized the film for its predictable plot twists, while Dave Kehr of the Chicago Tribune noted the lack of credit for Carl Barks, adding: "DuckTales is not a movie that the founding father would have been proud to put his name on." Charles Solomon of the Los Angeles Times faulted the lack of backstory, and regarded the character Dijon as a "cringing stereotype."

The film holds a 65% approval rating on Rotten Tomatoes based on 63 reviews with an average rating of 6/10. The consensus summarizes: "It certainly lacks the polish and creativity of other Disney animated features, but DuckTales the Movie: Treasure of the Lost Lamp delivers an action-packed romp with decent humor and plenty of diverting silliness."

=== Accolades ===
Year	Award	Category	Result	Ref.
1991	Young Artist Awards	Most Entertaining Family Youth Motion Picture - Animation	Nominated	

=== Home media ===
The film was released on VHS on March 15, 1991, followed by a Laserdisc release on April 26, 1991. The video sold 2.3 million units generating revenue of $32 million in the United States. It ended up as the ninth-best-selling video of 1991 in the United States. On January 16, 2006, the region 1 DVD of DuckTales the Movie: Treasure of the Lost Lamp was released as an exclusive to the Disney Movie Club and the Disney Movie Rewards program. The first release of the DVD to the general public was announced for January 13, 2015. Ahead of this, DVDs were available in Canada in October 2014, apparently as a Wal-Mart Exclusive. In addition, there was a DVD release also ahead of the general release date that was issued in the United States as a Wal-Mart Exclusive on October 14, 2014. Disney has given the DVD wide release in Europe and other parts of the world. The DVD release is in widescreen presentation (1.66:1) in region 1.

The film is available to rent and purchase (including in HD) on iTunes.

The HD version of DuckTales the Movie: Treasure of the Lost Lamp is available on Movies Anywhere and Disney+.

== Music ==
A soundtrack album was released by Intrada Records in 2017, including David Newman's score, but not the film's end title version of the TV series theme.

== Cancelled sequels ==
Treasure of the Lost Lamp was originally supposed to be the first in a series of DuckTales films. However, after the film performed below expectations, all sequels were scrapped. When asked about the possibility of a sequel, Bob Hathcock answered:

I don't know about DuckTales movies ... but I'd like to do another feature ... I'm proud of it. It's just a straight little adventure story.

== See also ==
- List of Disney animated films based on fairy tales
- Aladdin, a 1992 film from Disney that adapts elements from One Thousand and One Nights
