= Ambassador Hotel (Tulsa, Oklahoma) =

- U.S. National Register of Historic Places
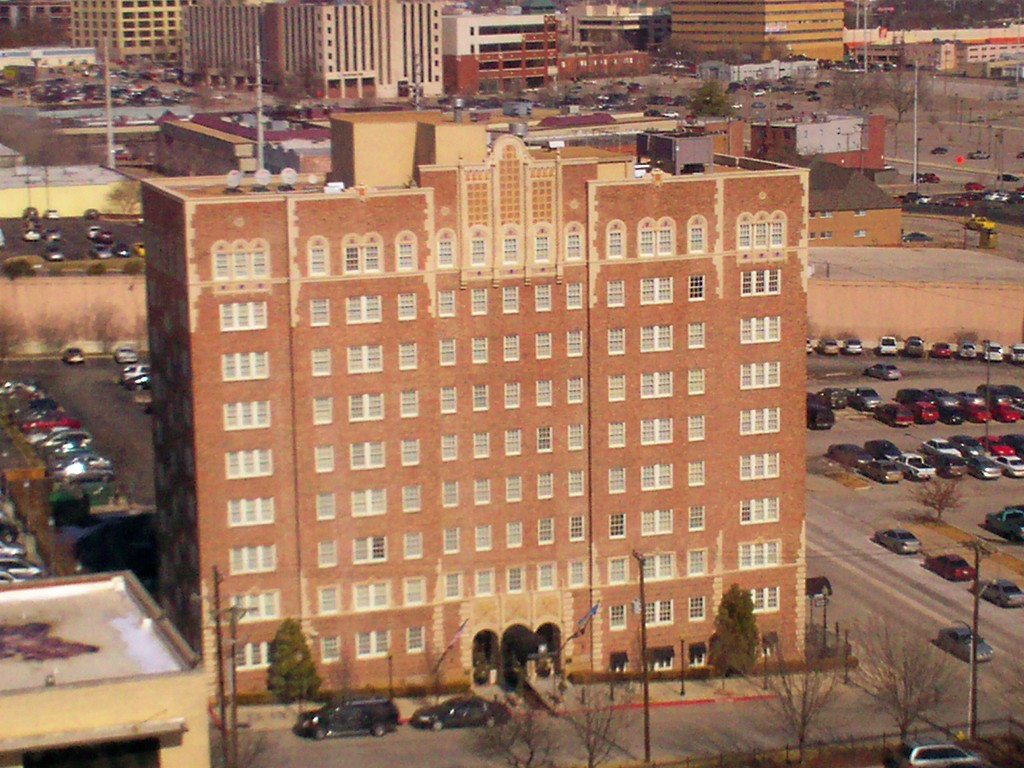
- Ambassador Hotel, February 16, 2007

- Location within Oklahoma
- Location: 1324 South Main, Tulsa, Oklahoma
- Coordinates: 36°08′34″N 95°59′15″W
- Built: 1929; 97 years ago
- Architect: N. E. Peters
- Architectural style: Mission/Spanish Colonial Revival
- NRHP reference No.: 99001085
- Added to NRHP: November 17, 1999; 26 years ago

General Patrick Hurley opened the Ambassador Hotel in 1929, intending it to be a luxury "extended stay" residence for Tulsa businessmen (mostly oil business top executives), who were building mansions that were not yet ready for occupancy. Hurley never stayed in the hotel he founded. He moved to Washington, D. C. in March 1929, after President Herbert Hoover chose him to be Secretary of War, after the death of the previous Secretary, who died in December 1929. Hurley never returned to Tulsa.

The hotel business in Tulsa cooled with the onset of the Great Depression. The building had a succession of owners and uses after the Great Depression, and was vacant for more than a decade at the end of the 20th century. An investment group bought the property in 1999, and spent heavily on restoration before reopening it as a boutique hotel, a niche market it continues to occupy. In 2014, the Ambassador agreed to rebrand itself as part of the Autograph Collection Hotels of Marriott International.

== History ==
Hurley had retained N. E. Peters as architect and Webb L. Elson as builder in 1928.

Delbert Development Company, a subsidiary of Kewanee Oil Company, bought the building in 1960 and converted the Ambassador to a commercial-type apartment hotel. The Ambassador became housing for retired seniors after the oil business declined in Tulsa, and closed altogether in 1987. Real estate developer Paul Coury and a group of investors bought the building in 1999 and began a $5.5 million restoration. The owners reopened the facility as a boutique hotel. In October 2014, Ambassador Hotel became a part of the Autograph Hotel Collection by Marriott. The agreement allows the Ambassador to retain its own identity. (Note: Coury owns other high-end Ambassador Hotels in Oklahoma City, Wichita and Kansas City which will be similarly rebranded.)

== Building description ==
The hotel building currently has 55 guest rooms and is located at the northwest corner of Main Street and 14th Street in Tulsa. It is included as a supporting item in the Riverview Historic District. Although the street address is given as 1324 South Main, the main entrance is actually on 14th Street, which runs along the south of the building. Constructed primarily of poured concrete columns and beams, it measures 120 feet (37 m) by 40 feet (12 m) in plan, It is 9 stories high and has a full basement. The ninth floor has a concrete slab ceiling. The building roof is flat and hidden from street view by a parapet. It was originally built on a wooden frame a few feet above the slab ceiling and was covered with asphalt. The frame was deteriorated beyond repair by 1999 and needed to be replaced. The replacement was to have a light steel frame.

The exterior of the building is covered with brick. It is decorated with limestone quoins and polychrome terra cotta ornaments. A limestone belt at the second floor level runs around the building on three sides (east, south and west) and the eastern bay of the north side. The belt is decorated with an acanthus leaf pattern. The second floor window sills are integral with the belt. Windows on the ninth floor have surrounds of limestone with arches above them. The south elevation has a continuous cornice of limestone.

== NRHP listing ==
The Ambassador Hotel was listed on the National Register of Historic Places (NRHP) on November 17, 1999, under Criterion C. (Note: NRHP definition of Criterion C: "Property embodies the distinctive characteristics of a type, period, or method of construction or represents the work of a master, or possesses high artistic values, or represents a significant and distinguishable entity whose components lack individual distinction.") According to the NRHP application, the Ambassador is "...the best remaining example of a large, multi-story Mission/Spanish Colonial Revival building designed for domestic use in the Tulsa downtown area".
