= Dude Duck =

1951 Donald Duck cartoon

- Theatrical release poster
- Directed by: Jack Hannah
- Story by: Ralph Wright; Riley Thomson
- Produced by: Walt Disney
- Starring: Clarence Nash
- Music by: Paul Smith
- Animation by: Al Bertino; Bob Carlson; Volus Jones; Bill Justice; Phyllis Barnhart (cel painter); Jack Boyd (effects)
- Layouts by: Yale Gracey
- Backgrounds by: Art Riley
- Color process: Technicolor
- Production company: Walt Disney Productions
- Distributed by: RKO Radio Pictures
- Release date: March 2, 1951
- Running time: 7:14
- Country: United States
- Language: English

Dude Duck is a 1951 American animated short film featuring Donald Duck, directed by Jack Hannah and produced by Walt Disney. In the short film, Donald goes on vacation to a dude ranch and gets a totally uncooperative horse as a mount.

== Plot ==
Donald is vacationing at a dude ranch. After all the beautiful women pick the best horses, Donald gets the worst horse of them all.

== Voice cast ==
- Clarence Nash as Donald Duck and Rover Boy

== Re-release ==
The short was re-released with DuckTales the Movie: Treasure of the Lost Lamp on August 3, 1990.

== Television ==
- Disneyland, episode #2.22: "On Vacation" (1954)
- Good Morning, Mickey, episode #1 (1983)
- Vacationing With Mickey and Friends (1984)
- Donald Takes a Holiday (1986)
- Disney's Rootin' Tootin' Roundup (1990)
- Mickey's Mouse Tracks, episode #1 (1992)
- Donald's Quack Attack, episode #22 (1992)
- The Ink and Paint Club, episode #1.30: "'50s Donald" (1997)

== Home media ==
The short was released on November 11, 2008, on Walt Disney Treasures: The Chronological Donald, Volume Four: 1951-1961.

Additional releases include:

- On Vacation with Mickey Mouse and Friends (VHS)
