= Nelle Peters =

American architect (1884–1974)

- Born: Nellie Elizabeth Nichols; December 11, 1884; Niagara, North Dakota
- Died: October 7, 1974 (aged 89); Sedalia, Missouri
- Education: Buena Vista College
- Occupation: Architect
- Spouse: William H. Peters (1911–1923)
- Buildings: Ambassador Hotel; Belvedere Apartments

Nelle Elizabeth Nichols Peters (1884–1974) was an American architect, known for designing many buildings in Kansas City.

== Life and career ==
=== Early life ===
She was born Nellie Elizabeth Nichols was born in December 1884 in a sod house in Niagara, North Dakota. During her childhood, her family moved to Minnesota and then Storm Lake, Iowa. As a young girl, she was interested in art and mathematics.

=== Education and career ===
She attended Buena Vista College at Storm Lake, Iowa as a vocal student. After her graduation, she pursued architecture as a means of combining her interests in art and mathematics. She moved to Sioux City to look for work, and was hired as a drafter by the Eisentrout, Colby, and Pottenger. She worked there for four years while taking correspondence courses in architecture. In 1907, she was sent to work in the firm's Kansas City office but in 1909, she left to establish her own business.

In 1911, she married William H. Peters, a designer with the Kansas City Terminal Railway, and continued to work. Following her 1923 divorce, she entered a particularly productive phase, designing a multitude of buildings over the next five years. Among her most outstanding works in Kansas City are the Ambassador Hotel, the Luzier Cosmetic Company building, and several apartment buildings, including the "literary group" named after famous authors on the west side of Country Club Plaza.

Her work also included buildings in Tulsa and Oklahoma City, Oklahoma; Columbia, Clinton, Boonville, and Jefferson City, Missouri; Nashville, North Carolina; Newark, New Jersey; and Columbus, Ohio.

Except for two periods of illness, Peters remained an active architect until retirement in 1965. She specialized in the design of apartment buildings and hotels, and she designed churches, residences, and commercial buildings. Frequent use of terra cotta ornamentation is a characteristic of her style.

=== Death ===
Her last years were spent in a nursing home in Sedalia, Missouri where she died in 1974. She is buried in Memorial Park Cemetery in Kansas City.

== Works ==
- McConahay Building, Kansas City, Mo., 1922
- Ambassador Hotel, Kansas City, Mo., 1924
- Luzier Cosmetic Company, Kansas City, Mo., 1928
- Park Castles, Kansas City, Mo., 1929
- Ambassador Hotel, Tulsa, Ok., 1929

== Legacy ==
Peters was considered one of Kansas City's most prolific architects, and she designed nearly 1,000 buildings.

Two districts in Kansas City have been named in her honor on the Kansas City Register of Historic Places. In 1982, the Nelle E. Peters Historic District was dedicated in a section of buildings at the corner of Summit Avenue and 37th Street. In 1989, the Nelle E. Peters Thematic Historic District was established within Country Club Plaza.

A district is named after her in Kansas City on the National Register of Historic Places as of July 23, 2009. The Nelle E. Peters Troost Avenue Historic District includes six apartment buildings in the block of 2700 Troost Avenue.

Peters is one of 13 women honored for contributions to Kansas City, Missouri, on the Women's Leadership Fountain at the Paseo and E 9th St. In 2021, she was posthumously inducted into the Starr Women's Hall of Fame, which honors women who have made Kansas City a better place to live.

== Gallery ==
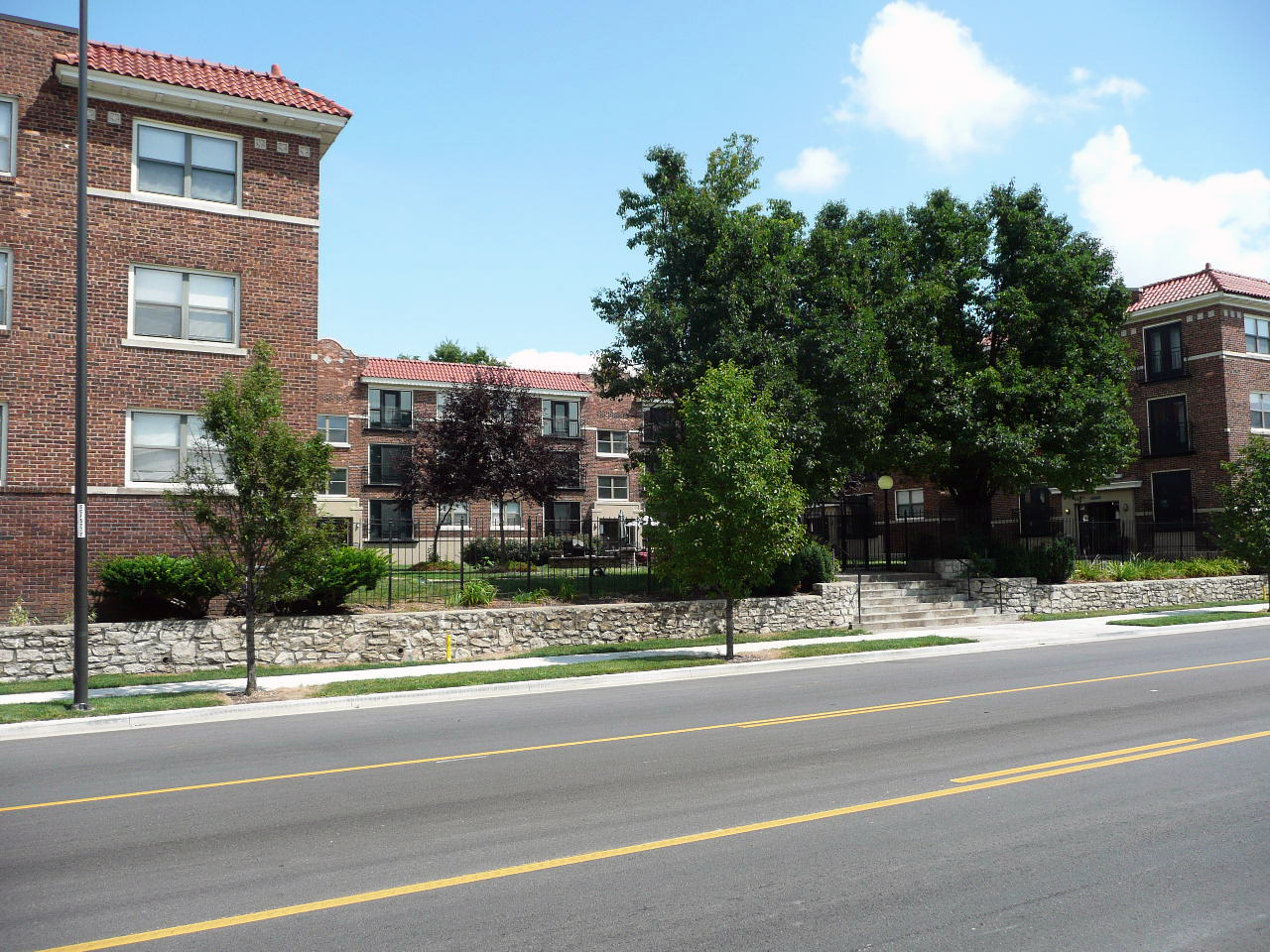
Nelle E. Peters Troost Avenue Historic District. 2719-37 Troost, Kansas City, Mo.

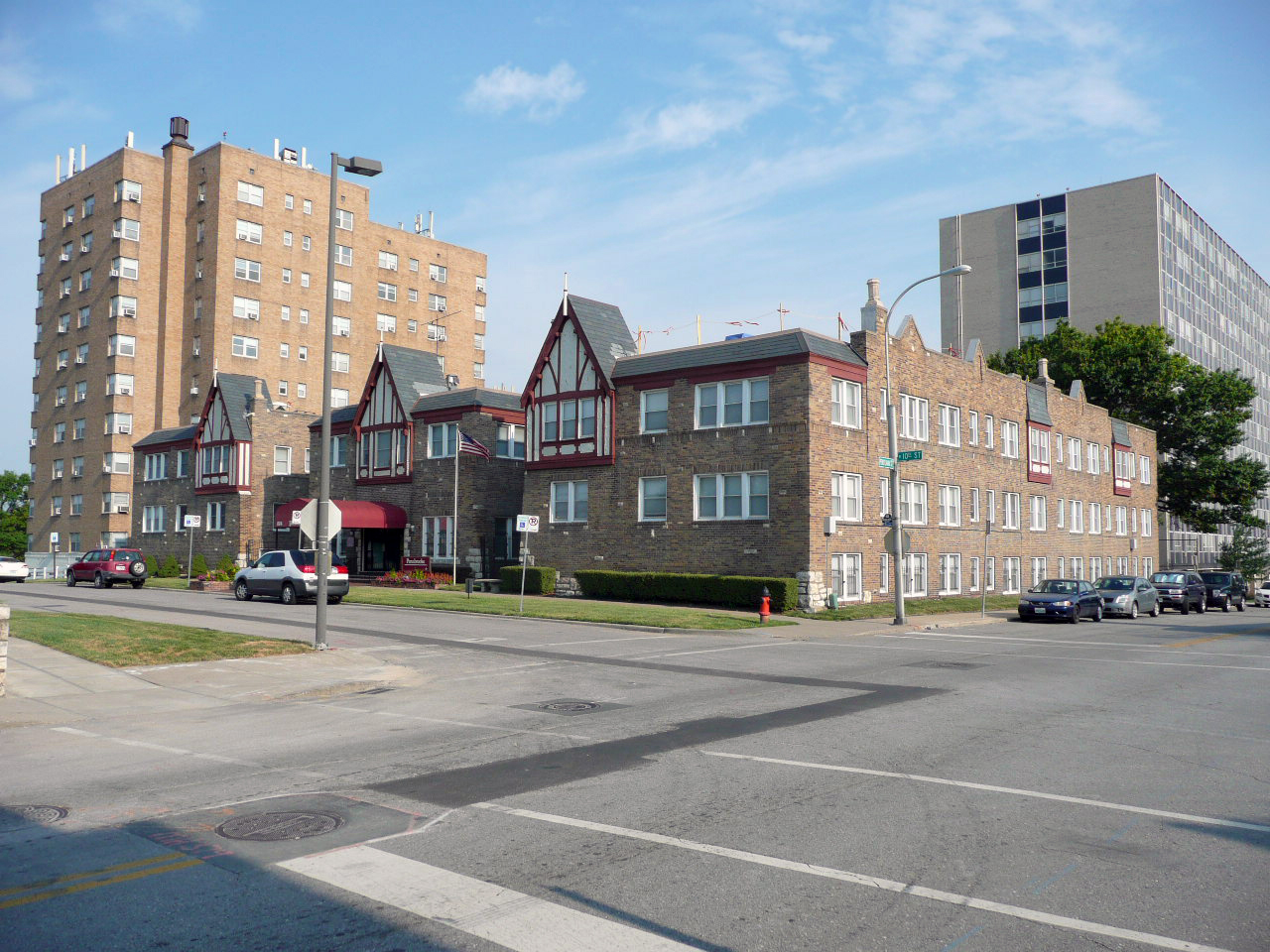
Pennbroke Apartments, Kansas City, Mo.

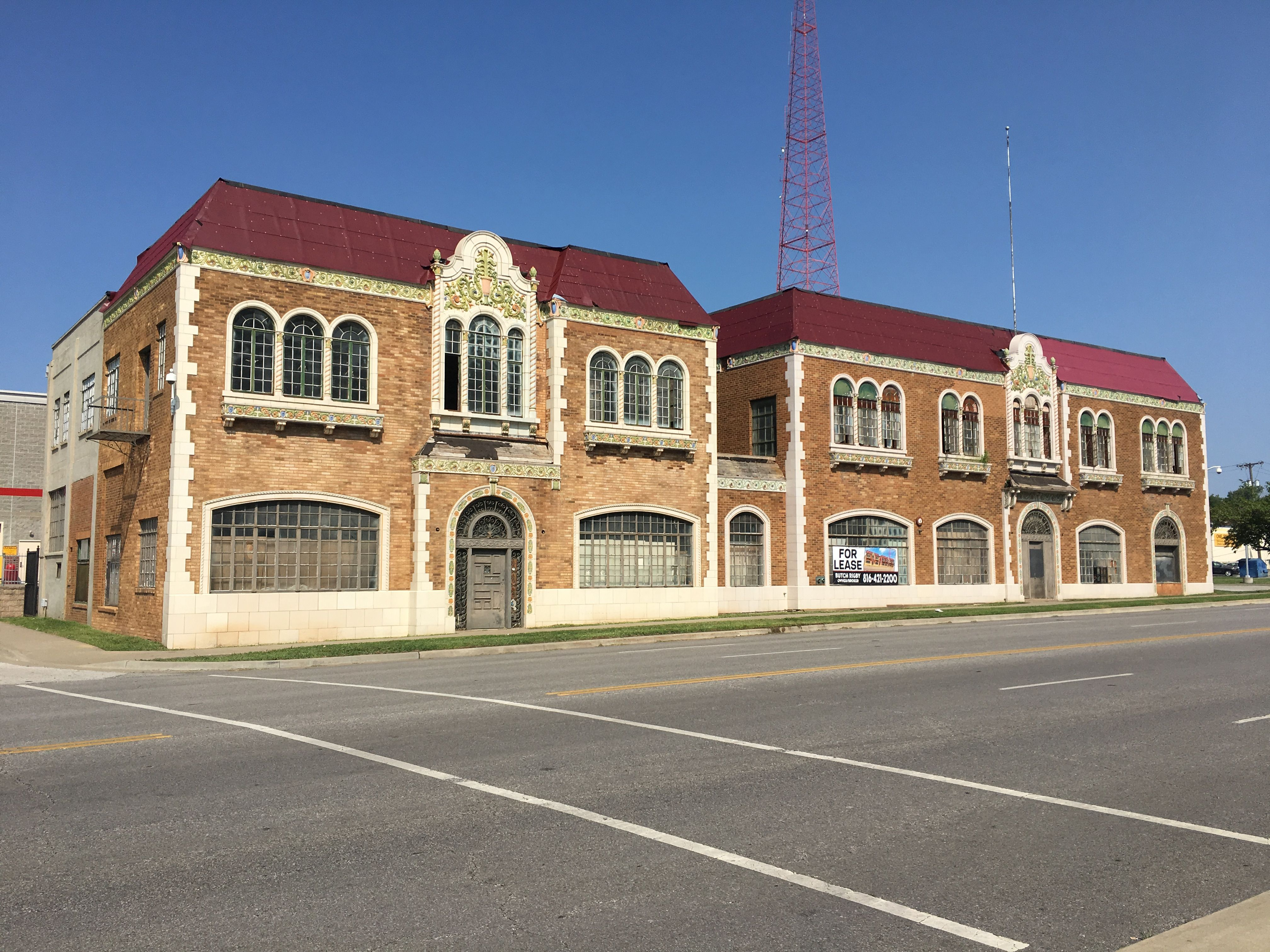
Luzier Special Formula Laboratories Building KCMO

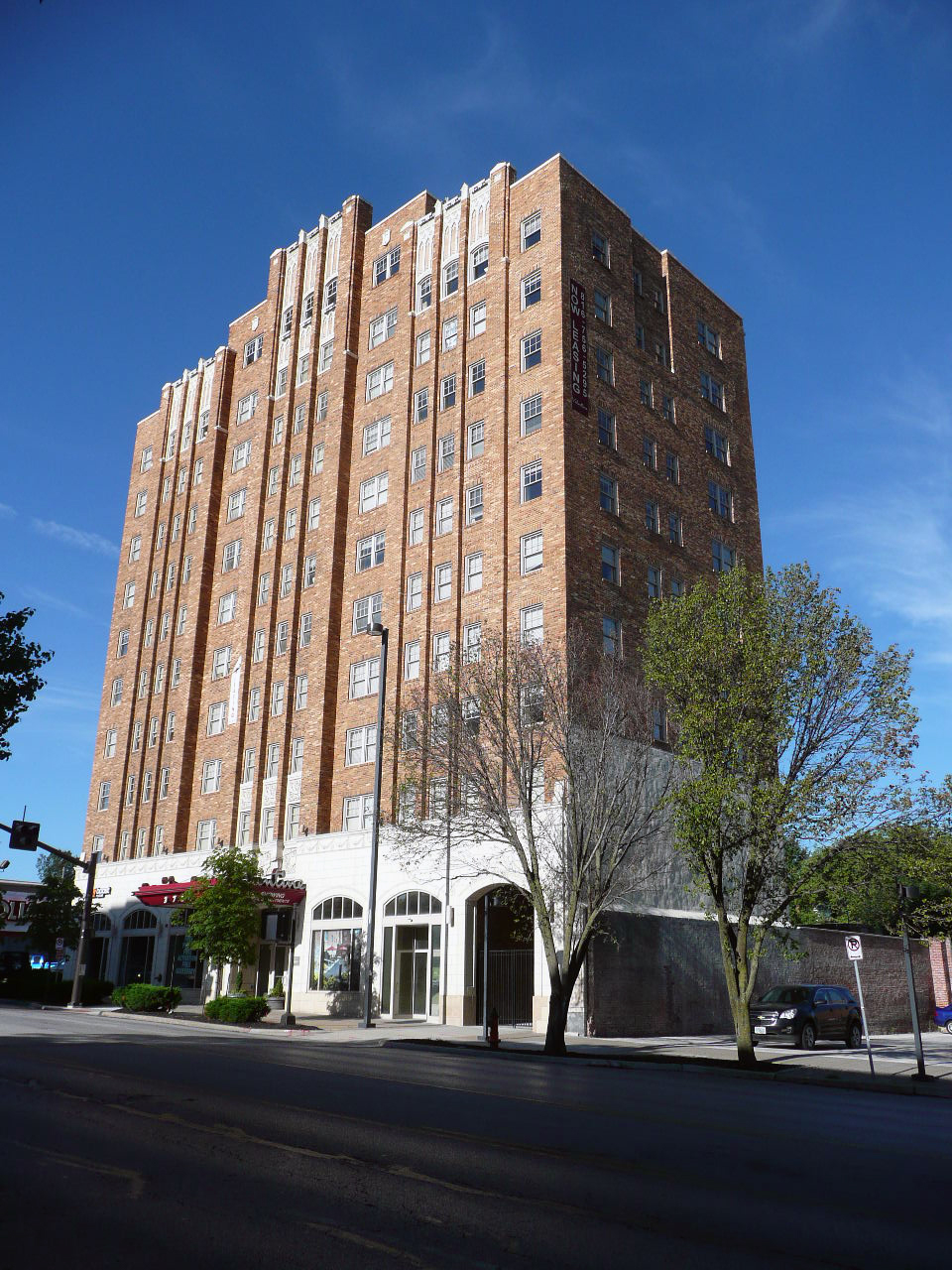
Valentine on Broadway Hotel, KCMO

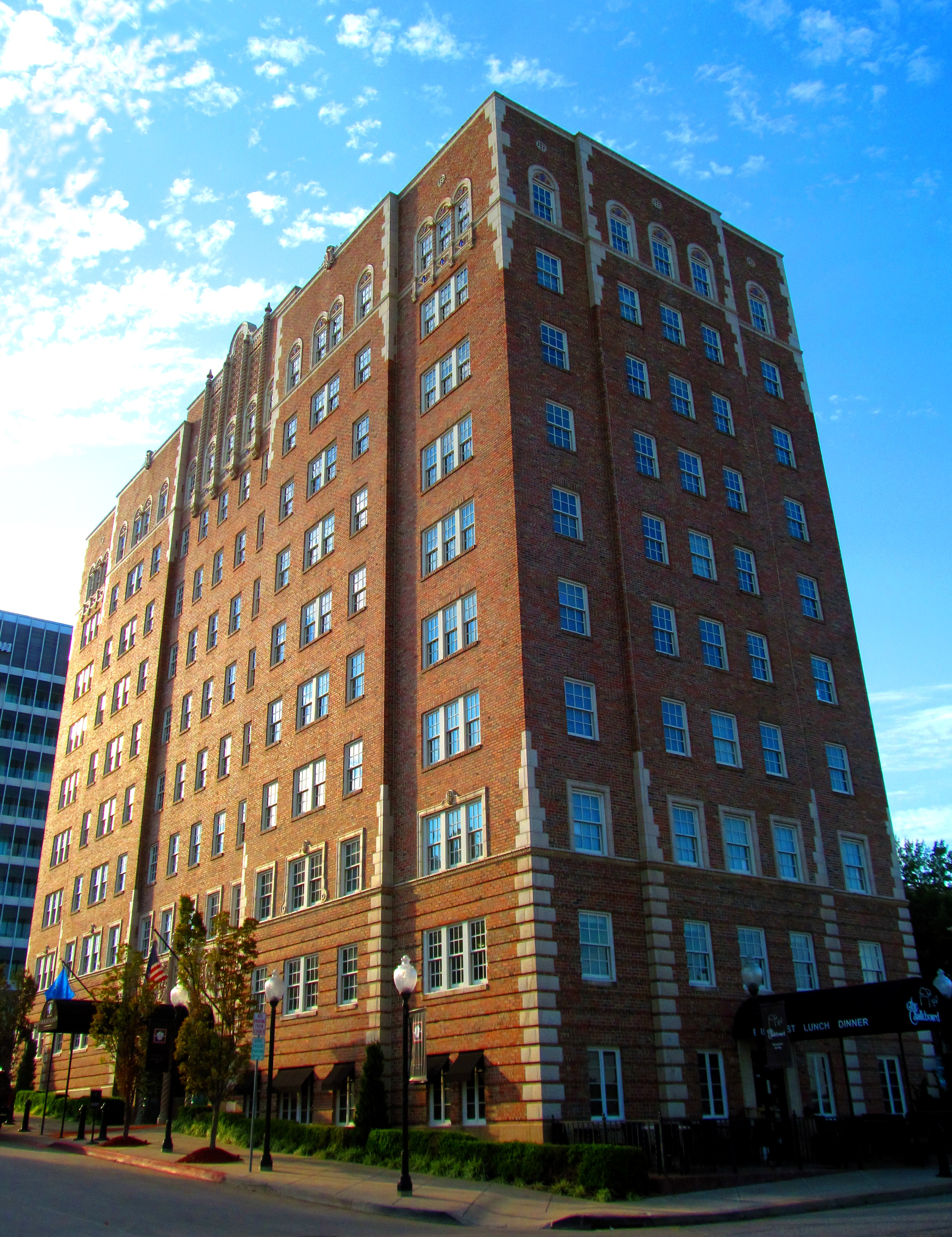
Ambassador Hotel, Tulsa, OK, Southeast

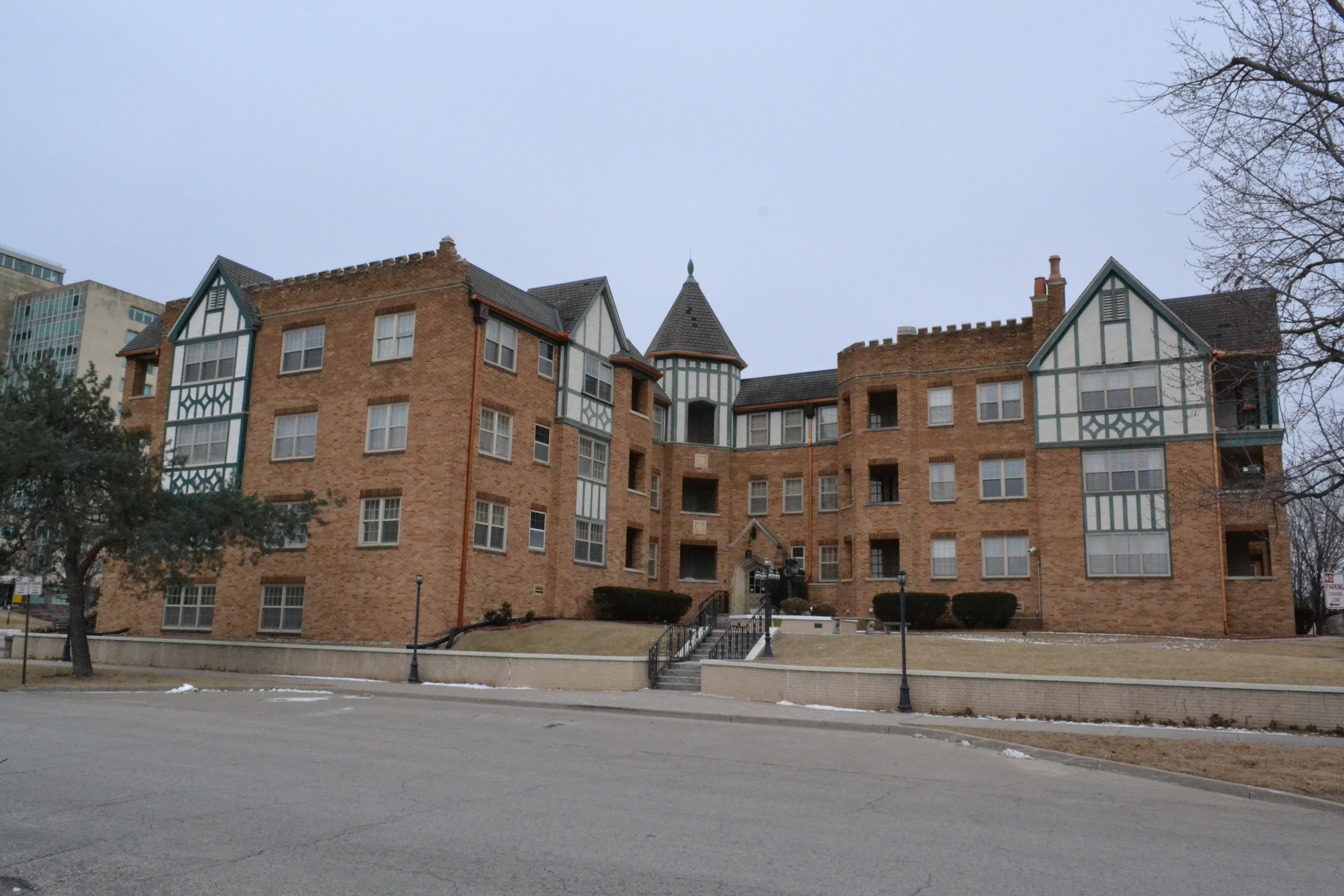
Senate Apartments, Topeka, KS
