= Laugh-O-Gram Studio =

Animation studio founded by Walt Disney

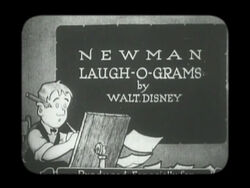

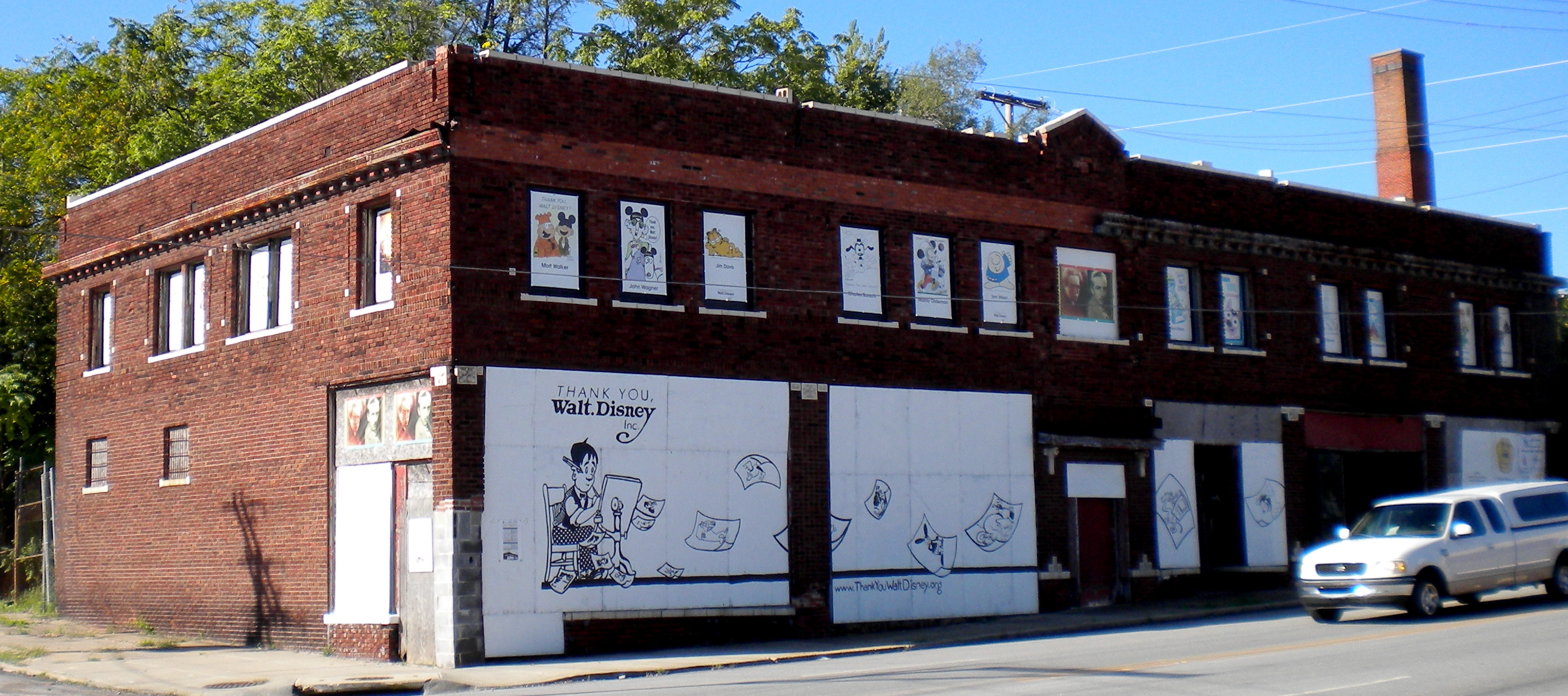
- McConahay Films Building in August 2010
- Industry: Film studio
- Predecessor: Iwerks-Disney Commercial Artists
- Founded: 1919; 107 years ago (As Iwerks–Disney Company); June 28, 1921; 105 years ago May 22, 1922; 104 years ago (incorpated)
- Founder: Walt Disney
- Defunct: October 16, 1923; 103 years ago
- Fate: Bankruptcy
- Successors: Disney Brothers Cartoon Studio (now The Walt Disney Company)
- Headquarters: McConahay Building 1127 East 31st Street: Kansas City, Missouri
- Key people: Walt Disney; Ub Iwerks; Hugh Harman; Rudolf Ising; Friz Freleng; Carman Maxwell
- Owner: Walt Disney

The Laugh-O-Gram Studio, also known as Laugh-O-Gram Films, was an American independent animation studio founded by Walt Disney on June 28, 1921 and closed on October 16, 1923. It was located on the second floor of the McConahay Building in Kansas City, Missouri, as a key early venture for Disney and his recruited pioneers of animation, including Ub Iwerks, Hugh Harman and Rudolf Ising.

The company was incorporated to produce a series of contracted animated shorts called Newman's Laugh-O-Grams. Disney was encouraged by their local popularity, and began producing his own series of modernized fairy tale cartoons, including Little Red Riding Hood. The studio secured a contract for six shorts with Pictorial Clubs, Inc., of Tennessee, but the distributor declared bankruptcy before fulfilling the payment terms. The loss of income crippled Laugh-O-Gram financially, forcing Disney to live in the office and bathe weekly at Union Station. A final project, a dental hygiene film called Tommy Tucker's Tooth, funded Disney's production of Alice's Wonderland, which combines live-action and animation in a last resort to create a successful franchise.

The studio filed for bankruptcy in July 1923. Disney sold his camera and moved to Hollywood with an unfinished reel of Alice's Wonderland. The move proved successful, because he secured a distribution deal with Margaret Winkler, which led to the creation of the Alice Comedies series and the founding of the Disney Brothers Cartoon Studio, the predecessor to the Walt Disney Company.

Disney later recalled that the creation of Mickey Mouse was inspired at Laugh-o-Gram Studio, based on a tame mouse he kept at his desk there. The story of the studio has been depicted in two feature films, As Dreamers Do and Walt Before Mickey. The historic McConahay Building fell into disrepair, and was acquired in 1990 by the nonprofit organization, Thank You, Walt Disney. Following the acquisition of the building, the organization initiated restoration efforts.

== History ==
=== Iwerks-Disney Commercial Artists ===
Walt Disney went to Kansas City in October 1919, where he worked as an apprentice artist at the Pesmen-Rubin Commercial Art Studio, where he drew commercial illustrations for advertising, theater programs and catalogs, and befriended fellow artist Ub Iwerks. In January 1920, as Pesmen-Rubin's revenue declined after Christmas, Disney, aged 18, and Iwerks were laid off.

They started their own business, the short-lived Iwerks-Disney Commercial Artists. Failing to attract many customers, Disney and Iwerks agreed that Disney should leave temporarily to earn money at the Kansas City Film Ad Company, run by A. V. Cauger; the following month Iwerks, who was not able to run their business alone, also joined. The company produced commercials using the cutout animation technique. Disney became interested in animation, although he preferred drawn cartoons such as Mutt and Jeff and Max Fleischer's Out of the Inkwell. With the assistance of a borrowed book on animation and a camera, he began experimenting at home. He came to the conclusion that cel animation was more promising than the cutout method.

=== Laugh-O-Gram Studio ===
In 1921, Walt Disney was contracted by Milton Feld to animate twelve cartoons, which he called Newman's Laugh-O-Grams. (Note: "1919–1924". Archived from the original on October 19, 2013. Source: Page 67. "Disney's World", by Leonard Mosley, 1985.) On May 23, 1922, when Disney was 20 years old, Laugh-O-Gram Films (LOGF) was incorporated by him using the remaining assets of the defunct Iwerks-Disney Commercial Artists from local investors. LOGF produced nine of the requested 12 films with little income. (Note: "1919–1924". Archived from the original on October 19, 2013. Sources: The Disney Studio Story, by Richard Holliss and Brian Sibley, 1988.; The Art of Walt Disney – From Mickey Mouse to the Magic Kingdoms, by Christopher Finch, 1973.; Disney's Art of Animation – From Mickey Mouse to Beauty and the Beast, by Bob Thomas, 1991.; Page 19. Walt Disney – Hollywood's Dark Prince, by Marc Eliot, 1993.; Page 67. "Disney's World", by Leonard Mosley, 1985.; Page 140. The International Dictionary of Films and Filmmakers: Volume II – Directors/Filmmakers, by Christopher Lyon, 1984.; Page 62. Walt Disney – An American Original, by Bob Thomas, 1994.; Page 40. Walt in Wonderland – The Silent Films of Walt Disney, by Russell Merritt and J.B. Kaufman, 1993.; Page 41. Walt Disney, by Jim Fanning, 1994.; Page 9. Walt Disney's Mickey Mouse – His Life and Times, by Richard Holliss, 1986.; Page 41. Walt Disney – Pop Culture Legends, by Jim Fanning, 1994.; Page 42. Building a Company – Roy O. Disney and the Creation of an Entertainment Empire, by Bob Thomas, 1998.; Page 13. Disney – The First 100 Years, updated edition, by Dave Smith and Steven Clark, 2002.; Page 61. Walt Disney – The Triumph of the American Imagination, by Neal Gabler, 2006.) Encouraged and inspired by his shorts' popularity at the theatre, Disney decided he wanted to make his own animated versions of fairy tales too, and invested six months on his first attempt at Little Red Riding Hood.

Disney's employees on the series included several pioneers of animation: Ub Iwerks, Hugh Harman, Rudolf Ising, and Carman Maxwell. The company had financial problems and by the end of 1922, Disney was living in the office and bathing weekly at Union Station.

During the studio's sales manager Leslie Mace's stay in New York, where he was looking for distributors, he ended up signing a contract for six animated shorts with Pictorial Clubs, Inc. of Tennessee on Sunday, September 16, 1922. Pictorial agreed to pay US$11,000 (equivalent to $211,581 in 2025) for the cartoons, which were supposed to be shown at schools and other non-theatrical places, but only paid $100 in advance. The rest of the payment would have to wait until January 1, 1924, when all the shorts had been delivered. When Pictorial went bankrupt only a few months later, the studio never received the rest of the payment, its financial problems became even more serious, and the staff ended up leaving. When the local Kansas City dentist Thomas B. McCrum, from the Deener Dental Institute, contacted Disney and offered him the job of producing a short subject about dental hygiene intended for the Missouri school system, he brought together some of his staff again and made Tommy Tucker's Tooth, which earned the studio $500. Instead of paying off his creditors, the money was invested in the live-action/animation demonstration film Alice's Wonderland, starring the youthful Virginia Davis. Disney had noted how popular the Out of the Inkwell series from the Fleischer Studios was, which had animated characters interacting with the real world. By reversing this gimmick and using a real-life character in a cartoon universe instead, he hoped for a hit. Virginia Davis's contract with Laugh-O-Gram was signed by her parents on April 23, 1923, with terms giving her 5% of the Alice's Wonderland film's receipts. (Note: "1919–1924". Archived from the original on October 19, 2013. Source: page 49. Walt in Wonderland – The Silent Films of Walt Disney, by Russell Merritt and J.B. Kaufman, 1993.) Looking for a distributor for Alice's Wonderland on May 14, Disney wrote to Margaret J. Winkler, a New York film distributor. Disney wrote to Winkler's former employer, Warner Bros. Pictures founder Harry Warner, who recommended Winkler's services. (Note: "1919–1924". Archived from the original on October 19, 2013. Sources: Page 22. Walt Disney – Hollywood's Dark Prince, by Marc Eliot, 1993.; Page 52. Walt in Wonderland – The Silent Films of Walt Disney, by Russell Merritt and J.B. Kaufman, 1993.; Page 79. Walt Disney – The Triumph of the American Imagination, by Neal Gabler, 2006.)

After finishing the raw edits of Alice's Wonderland, (Note: "1919–1924". Archived from the original on October 19, 2013. Sources: [16] [23] [24] [40.69] [63.50]) the studio filed for Chapter 11 bankruptcy in July 1923. (Note: "1919–1924". Archived from the original on October 19, 2013. Sources: [1] [34.22] [1102.72] (spring [40.71]) (August [63.51])) Disney finally made some money by shooting a film of a 6-month-old girl named Kathalee Viley and selling his movie camera, earning enough for a one-way train ticket, moving to Hollywood, California; he brought along an unfinished reel of Alice's Wonderland.

The bankruptcy trustee was able to force LOGF's erstwhile distributor and debtor, Pictorial Films, Inc., to pay LOGF's agents the sum owed while agreeing that Pictorial could exercise its contractual distribution rights for LOGF works and to purchase several of LOGF's films: The Four Musicians of Bremen, Jack the Giant Killer, the Lafflets series, and Alice's Wonderland.

The studio building fell to ruin and efforts were made to restore it by a non-profit group called "Thank You, Walt Disney". The Disney family promised $450,000 in matching funds for the rights to other Disney memorabilia and to tell the history of Walt Disney's life in Kansas City, a movie house to exhibit original and restored Laugh-O-Grams, and an education center for animation workshops.

On July 30, 2021, a black Dodge Charger struck the building and caused significant damage to the exterior. The incident occurred early in the morning, the driver fleeing the scene, though authorities subsequently found a woman's driving license and a margarita within the vehicle. Butch Rigby, who launched the campaign to save and restore the building, described the incident optimistically: "The bottom line, it's a bump in the road, but it could have been worse".

== Inspiration for Mickey Mouse ==
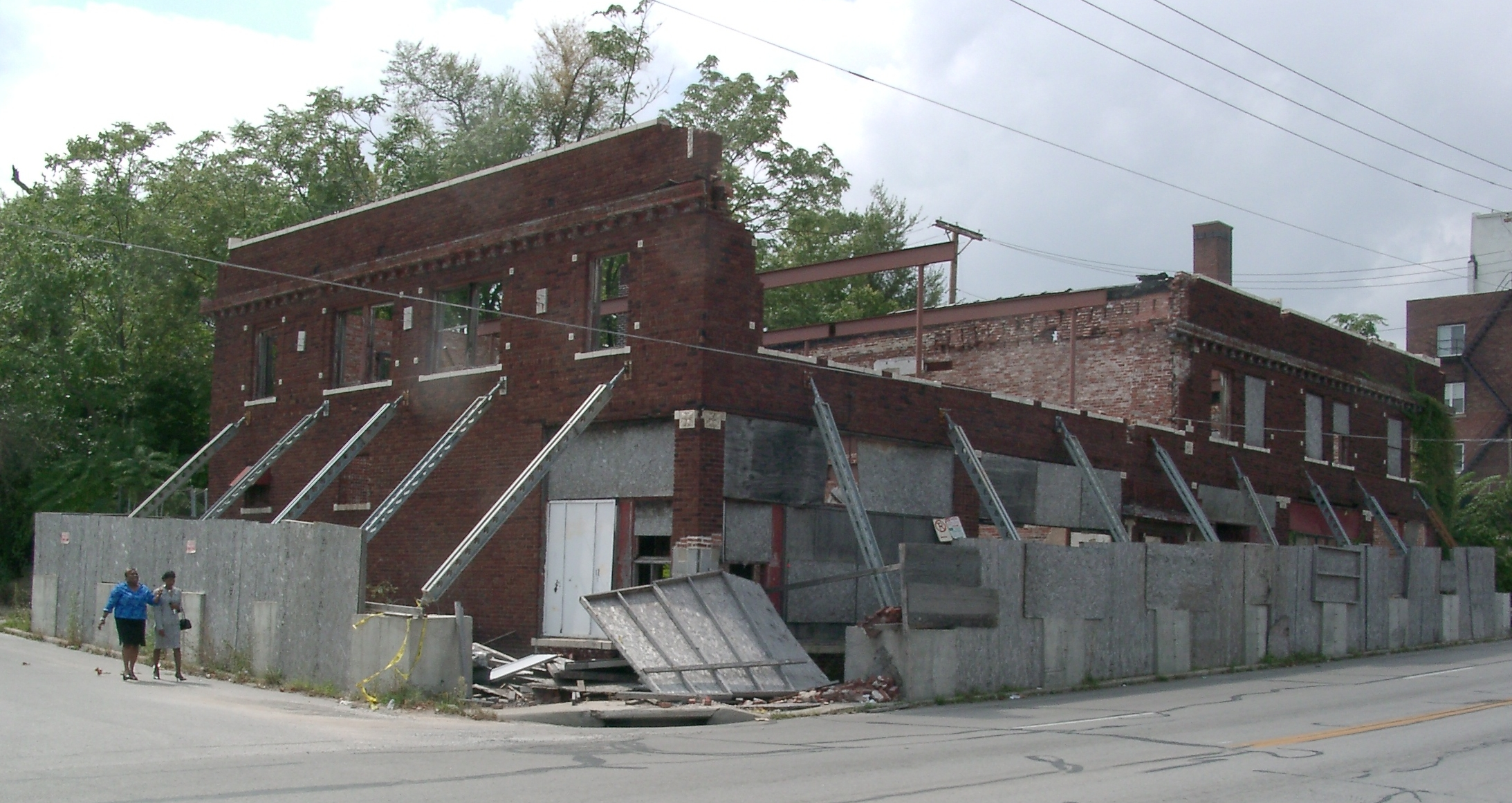
McConahay Building in 2004

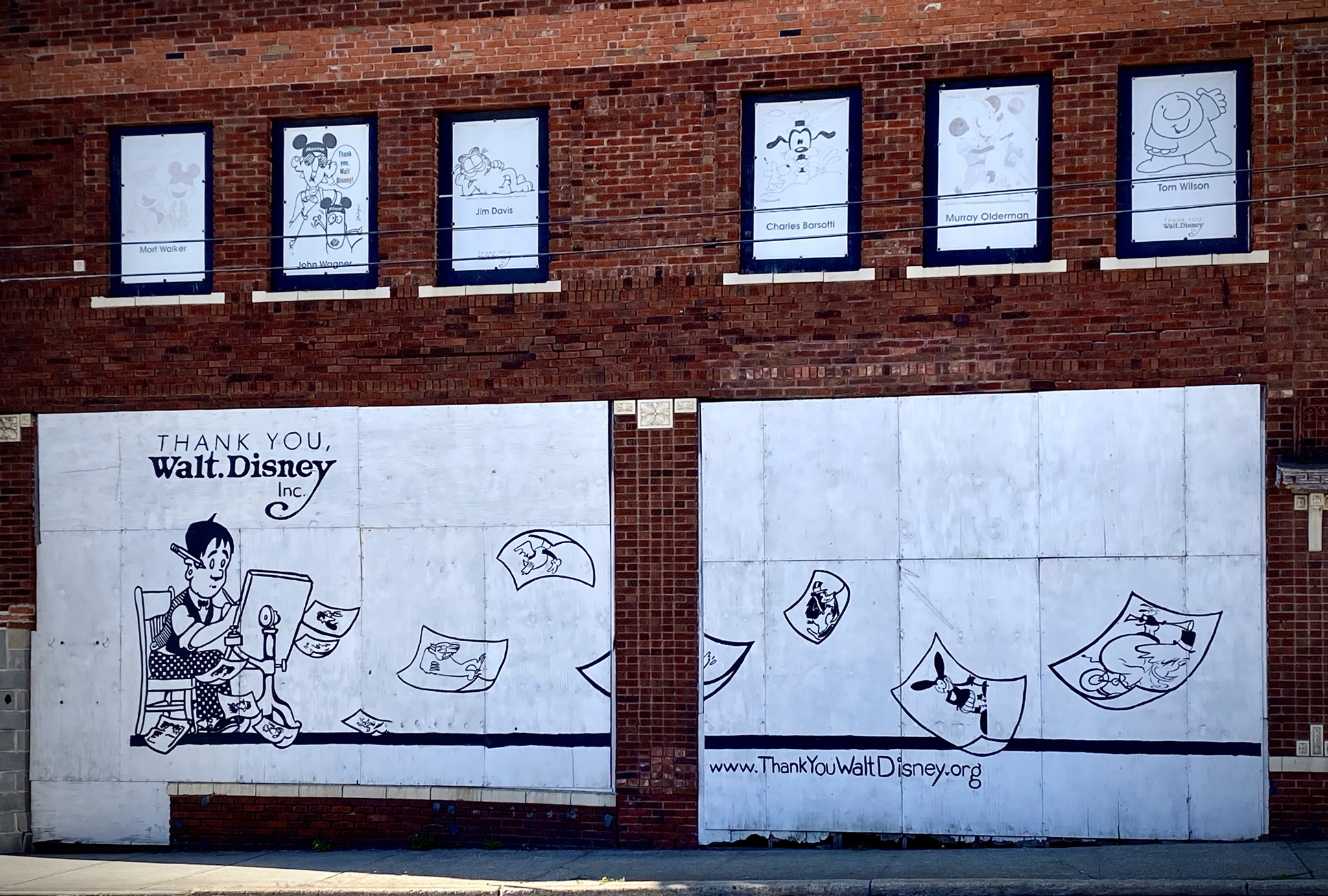
Left side of the Thank You Walt Disney mural

Disney told interviewers that the inspiration to draw Mickey came from a tame mouse at his desk at Laugh-O-Gram Studio in Kansas City, Missouri.

They used to fight for little pieces of cheese in my waste-basket when I worked alone late at night. I lifted them out and kept them in wire cages on my desk. I grew particularly fond of one brown house mouse. He was a timid little guy. By tapping him on the nose with my pencil, I trained him to run inside a black circle I drew on my drawing board. When I left Kansas City to try my luck at Hollywood, I hated to leave him behind. So I carefully carried him to a backyard, making sure it was a nice neighborhood, and the tame little fellow scampered to freedom.

In 1928 during a train trip to New York, he showed the drawing to his wife Lillian Marie Bounds and said he was going to call it "Mortimer Mouse". She replied that the name sounded "too pompous" and suggested Mickey Mouse instead.

== Filmography ==
Of the original seven Laugh-O-Grams fairy tales, four were long known to have survived, and have been restored for DVD: Newman Laugh-O-Grams (1921), Little Red Riding Hood (1922), The Four Musicians of Bremen (1922), Puss in Boots (1922), and Cinderella (1922). These shorts later became available on Blu-ray Disc as bonus features for Disney's Beauty and the Beast. Tommy Tucker's Tooth (1922) and Alice's Wonderland (1923) are also available on DVD, and Alice's Wonderland eventually became a bonus feature for the 60th Anniversary Blu-ray Edition of Alice in Wonderland. The original piece of filming and animation known as Newman Laugh-O-Grams (originally released theatrically on March 20, 1921) is available on some DVDs too. In accordance with United States copyright law, all 11 shorts produced by the studio have entered into the public domain due to either non-renewal or non-registration.

The missing fairy tale cartoons were Jack and the Beanstalk, Jack the Giant Killer, and Goldie Locks and the Three Bears (all 1922). In October 2010, copies of all three cartoons had been found according to animation historian David Gerstein. For many years the two Jack cartoons were believed to be one, until researcher John Kenworthy located old studio assets sheets confirming that they were separate shorts.

#	Year	Title	Notes	Film (if available)
1	1921	Newman Laugh-O-Grams	The pilot and only surviving piece of an old newsreel series that was only seen at Newman Theater.	
2	1922	Little Red Riding Hood	Walt Disney's first "real" cartoon. Briefly features Julius the Cat, here unnamed. Later reissued with synchronized sound in 1929–1930 as a Whoopee Sketches (USA) and Peter the Puss (UK) cartoon, retitled Grandma Steps Out.	
3	1922	The Four Musicians of Bremen	Featuring Julius the Cat, here unnamed. Later reissued with synchronized sound in 1929–1930 as a Whoopee Sketches (USA) and Peter the Puss (UK) cartoon, retitled The Four Jazz Boys.	
4	1922	Jack and the Beanstalk	Featuring Jack and Julius the Cat, here unnamed. Later reissued with synchronized sound in 1929–1930 as a Whoopee Sketches (USA) and Peter the Puss (UK) cartoon, retitled On the Up and Up.	Out of circulation.
5	1922	Jack the Giant Killer	Featuring Jack, Susie, and Julius the Cat, here unnamed. Later reissued with synchronized sound in 1929–1930 as a Whoopee Sketches (USA) and Peter the Puss (UK) cartoon, retitled The K-O Kid.	
6	1922	Goldie Locks and the Three Bears	Featuring Julius the Cat, here unnamed. Later reissued with synchronized sound in 1929–1930 as a Whoopee Sketches (USA) and Peter the Puss (UK) cartoon, retitled The Peroxide Kid.	Out of circulation.
7	1922	Puss in Boots	Featuring Jack, Susie, and Julius the Cat, here unnamed. The king in the cartoon also made a cameo in the 1922 Laugh-O-Gram Cinderella. Later reissued with synchronized sound in 1929–1930 as a Whoopee Sketches (USA) and Peter the Puss (UK) cartoon, retitled The Cat's Whiskers.	
8	1922	Cinderella	Featuring Susie (as Cinderella), Jack (as the Prince), and Julius the Cat, here unnamed. Later reissued with synchronized sound in 1929–1930 as a Whoopee Sketches (USA) and Peter the Puss (UK) cartoon, retitled The Slippery Kid.	
9	1922	Tommy Tucker's Tooth	Mostly live-action.	
10	1923	Martha	Lost film.	
11	1923	Alice's Wonderland	Pilot film for Alice Comedies.	

== See also ==
- List of points of interest in Kansas City, Missouri
- Walt Disney Hometown Museum, located in his hometown of Marceline, Missouri
- List of Disney animated films based on fairy tales
- Studio system
