= Phyllis Barnhart =

- Born: December 16, 1922; Levan, Utah, U.S.
- Died: February 6, 2008 (aged 85); Salt Lake City, Utah, U.S.
- Spouse: Dale Barnhart
- Children: Philo Barnhart

Phyllis Barnhart (December 16, 1922 – February 6, 2008) was an American animator and cel painter. She was best known for her work on the 1982 animated film, The Secret of NIMH.

== History ==
Naomi Phyllis Fowler was born on December 16, 1922, in Levan, Utah. She began her career in animation at the Disney studio during the 1940s, starting on the films Fun & Fancy Free and Melody Time, at the inking and painting department. She later worked as a freelance assistant animator and cel painter for such classic animation studios as Filmation, Hanna-Barbera, Bandolier Films, Chuck Jones Productions, Murakami-Wolf-Swenson, DePatie-Freleng and of course, Disney. She worked as one of the lead cel painters for The Secret of NIMH (1982), which was created at Don Bluth Productions.

=== Death ===
Phyllis Barnhart died at age 85, on February 6, 2008, in Salt Lake City, Utah.

== Personal life ==
Barnhart's husband Dale Barnhart, died in 1996. He worked as a Disney layout and background artist on films such as The Jungle Book and The Sword in the Stone.

== Filmography ==
Phyllis Barnhart's film roles
Year	Film
1944	The Three Caballeros
1946	Make Mine Music
1946	Song of the South
1947	Fun and Fancy Free
1948	Melody Time
1949	Toy Tinkers
1951	Dude Duck
1951	Tomorrow We Diet!
1960	From Hare to Heir
1961	One Hundred and One Dalmatians
1963	The Sword in the Stone
1972	Journey Back to Oz
1973	Charlotte's Web
1973	Robin Hood
1977	The Mouse and His Child
1977	It's Grinch Night
1980	Daffy Duck's Easter Show
1981	Dennis the Menace in Mayday for Mother
1981	The Fox and the Hound
1982	The Secret of NIMH
1983	Winnie the Pooh and a Day for Eeyore

Phyllis Barnhart's television roles
Year	Series
1971–1972	The Pebbles and Bamm-Bamm Show
1974	The Dogfather
1975	ABC Nutrition Spots
