= Tommy Tucker's Tooth =

1922 film by Walt Disney

- Directed by: Walt Disney
- Story by: Walt Disney
- Produced by: Walt Disney
- Animation by: Walt Disney
- Layouts by: Walt Disney
- Backgrounds by: Walt Disney
- Color process: Black and white
- Production company: Laugh-O-Grams
- Distributed by: Pictorial Clubs
- Release date: December 6, 1922
- Running time: 10:34
- Country: United States
- Language: Silent film

Tommy Tucker's Tooth

Tommy Tucker's Tooth is a 1922 American educational short film directed by Walt Disney at his short-lived Laugh-O-Grams studio in Kansas City from 1922. The format was black and white, and without sound.

== Content ==
The film was one of two commissioned by Kansas City Dentist Thomas B. McCrum. It earned the Laugh-O-Gram studio $500. It extols the virtue of regular tooth brushing through the story of two boys: Tommy Tucker and Jimmie Jones. Tommy cares for his teeth, while Jimmie does not. The film ends with advice on proper tooth-brushing technique.

== Follow-up short ==
In 1926 Disney made the follow-up short Clara Cleans Her Teeth, starring Walt's niece Marjorie Sewell Davis, after being contacted by McCrum again, who asked for a sequel.
