= Puss in Boots (1922 film) =

1922 film by Walt Disney

- Directed by: Walt Disney
- Written by: Walt Pfeiffer
- Produced by: Walt Disney
- Cinematography: Red Lyon
- Production company: Laugh-O-Gram Studio
- Distributed by: Pictorial Clubs
- Release date: November 3, 1922
- Running time: 9 minutes
- Country: United States
- Language: Silent film with English intertitles

Puss in Boots is a 1922 American silent animated short film directed by Walt Disney. The film was based on the book by Charles Perrault.

== Production ==
The film was produced in Kansas City, Missouri. It is one of the earliest surviving products of the Laugh-O-Gram Studio to be based on a fairy tale, alongside Little Red Riding Hood (1919) and Cinderella (1922). There were a total of seven Laugh-O-Grams based on fairy tales. The three already mentioned, plus The Four Musicians of Bremen (1922), Jack and the Beanstalk (1922), Jack the Giant Killer (1922), and Goldie Locks and the Three Bears (1922). While supposedly based on Puss in Boots (1697) by Charles Perrault, it bears little actual resemblance to any literary version of the story. Disney likely did not care about retelling a tale already familiar to the audience, and set out to create a distinct version of the tale.

The film is representative of 1920s Disney-produced films in a relying on visual gags, anarchic humor, and (in the finale) a chase scene. In contrast, the 1930s fairy-tale derived animated shorts incorporated themes examining the morality of the characters involved, and were more didactic in intent. This was part of a shift in animation of the time, as the products of the film form previously consisted mostly of comedy films. Disney led the way towards the animated melodrama genre and the incorporation of seriousness in the plots.

The relatively primitive drawings were created by the small staff of the studio, which consisted of Walt Disney himself, Hugh Harman, Rudolf Ising, Ub Iwerks, Carman Maxwell, Lorrey Tague, and Otto Walliman. The frequent gags and unconventional plots provide the Laugh-O-Grams with the mood of a carnival spectacle.

== Setting ==
The setting of the film is contemporary, effectively featuring the 1920s United States, albeit with the anachronistic presence of a traditional monarchy in an otherwise modern setting.

== Plot ==
The short

The hero of the tale is Jack, a young commoner. Julius is his male black cat. The hero is in love with Susie, the daughter of a king, and the feeling is mutual. Julius is in love with James, the white dog of the king, who also serves as the royal chauffeur. The king objects to both relationships and throws the commoner and his cat out of the palace. The rejected duo head to a movie theater, seeking entertainment. They watch a film featuring "Rodolph Vaselino" (Rudolph Valentino) as a bullfighter. The film inspires Julius to form a plan which will allow his master to win the hand of the royal daughter, but Julius first asks for a prize for his services, a pair of boots.

In time, the duo organizes a bullfighting spectacle, with the hero in disguise as a masked bullfighter. Julius' original plan was to use a hypnotic machine to control the bull and impress the king. The actual fight ends up involving a more physical struggle, but the hero does come out on top. The king is suitably impressed to offer the hand of his daughter to the masked bullfighter.

Shortly after, the king wishes to learn the identity of his prospective son-in-law. He is enraged to discover the commoner he dislikes behind the mask of the bullfighter, but the hero leads the royal daughter in a quick escape, followed by Julius and the chauffeur. The four of them make it to the royal automobile and escape, while the king briefly and futilely gives chase on foot. The films ends with the car speeding off into the distance.

== Analysis ==
In comparison to the traditional tale, there is a significant shift in focus. The "cunning cat" plays a decisive part, but the focus is on the master. The depiction of the master is also considerably different. While a commoner, the hero is not a peasant. He is also not particularly stupid. He is instead a young man seeking victory at all costs.

In running away with the virgin daughter of the king, the hero deprives the king of his most valued possession: his own daughter. Jack Zipes suggests that there is an underlying theme of the Oedipus complex in this action. The young boy has managed to defeat and humiliate the father figure of the tale.

The film has a rather democratic theme in its treatment of the monarch. This authority figure is humiliated and its power is undermined, all through the efforts of a commoner who stages a personal revolt. The theme is probably derived from the tradition of republicanism in the United States, which rejected monarchy in its various forms.

Technology plays a significant role in the film. A film is depicted as stimulating the mind of the viewer, Puss, and inspiring her plot. A hypnotic machine helps defeat the mighty bull. An automobile is the vehicle for the safe escape of the hero. The presence of these technological devices places the setting of the film decidedly within the 20th century. In a way, the film can be seen as the triumph of modernity and those embracing it over the representatives of antiquated, traditional ways of thought.

A final departure from the traditional fairy tale can be found in its conclusion. A conventional happy ending to a fairy tale tends to involve a wedding ceremony and the victorious characters moving into a castle. This animated short concludes with an open ending.

== See also ==
- List of Disney animated shorts
- Walt Disney

== Sources ==
- Zipes, Jack (1997), "Of Cats and Men: Framing the Civilizing Discourse of the Fairy Tale", Happily Ever After: Fairy Tales, Children and the Culture Industry, Routledge, ISBN 9781135253035
- Zipes, Jack (2010), "De-Disneyfying Disney", The Enchanted Screen: The Unknown History of Fairy-Tale Films, Taylor & Francis, ISBN 9780203927496
- Zipes, Jack (2010), "Animated Fairy-Tales Cartoons", The Enchanted Screen: The Unknown History of Fairy-Tale Films, Taylor & Francis, ISBN 9780203927496
