= McConahay Building =

- U.S. National Register of Historic Places
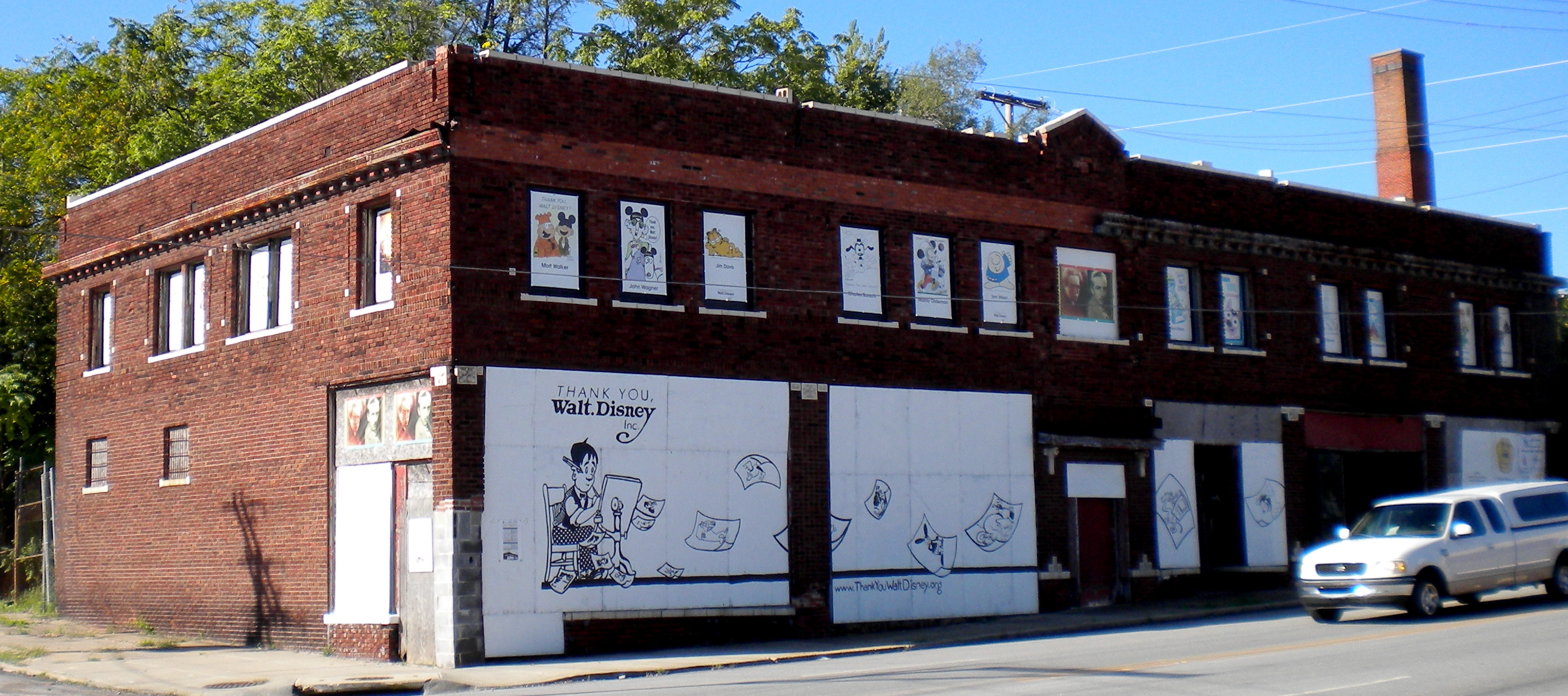
- McConahay Building in 2010

- Location within Missouri Location within the United States
- Location: 1121--1131 E. 31st St., Kansas City, Missouri
- Coordinates: 39°4′13″N 94°34′12″W
- Area: less than one acre
- Built: 1922
- Architect: Peters, Nelle E.
- Architectural style: Tapestry Brick Commercial
- NRHP reference No.: 78001655
- Added to NRHP: May 22, 1978

The McConahay Building in Kansas City, Missouri is a two-story Tapestry Brick building designed by prominent Kansas City architect Nelle E. Peters in 1922.

From the building's completion (in May 1922) to June 1923 the McConahay building housed Laugh-O-Gram Studio, Walt Disney's first commercial film studio, which occupied a five-room suite of studios on the second floor. Here, he developed the cartoon character Mickey Mouse based on resident mice that he trained. He frequently ate at the Forest Inn Cafe in the building's first floor.

The building was listed on the National Register of Historic Places in 1978. The application for listing describes the building as "a fine local example of tapestry brick design architecture; exterior facades are of brickwork interspersed with cut stone and/or terra cotta blocks to form geometric designs".

Historical status generally protects buildings from demolition, but it had deteriorated to the point where this had been considered. A local organization, Thank You Walt Disney, Inc., has acquired the building and is in the process of restoring it.
