= Belvedere Apartments (Columbia, Missouri) =

Coordinates: 38.9489°N 92.3253°W

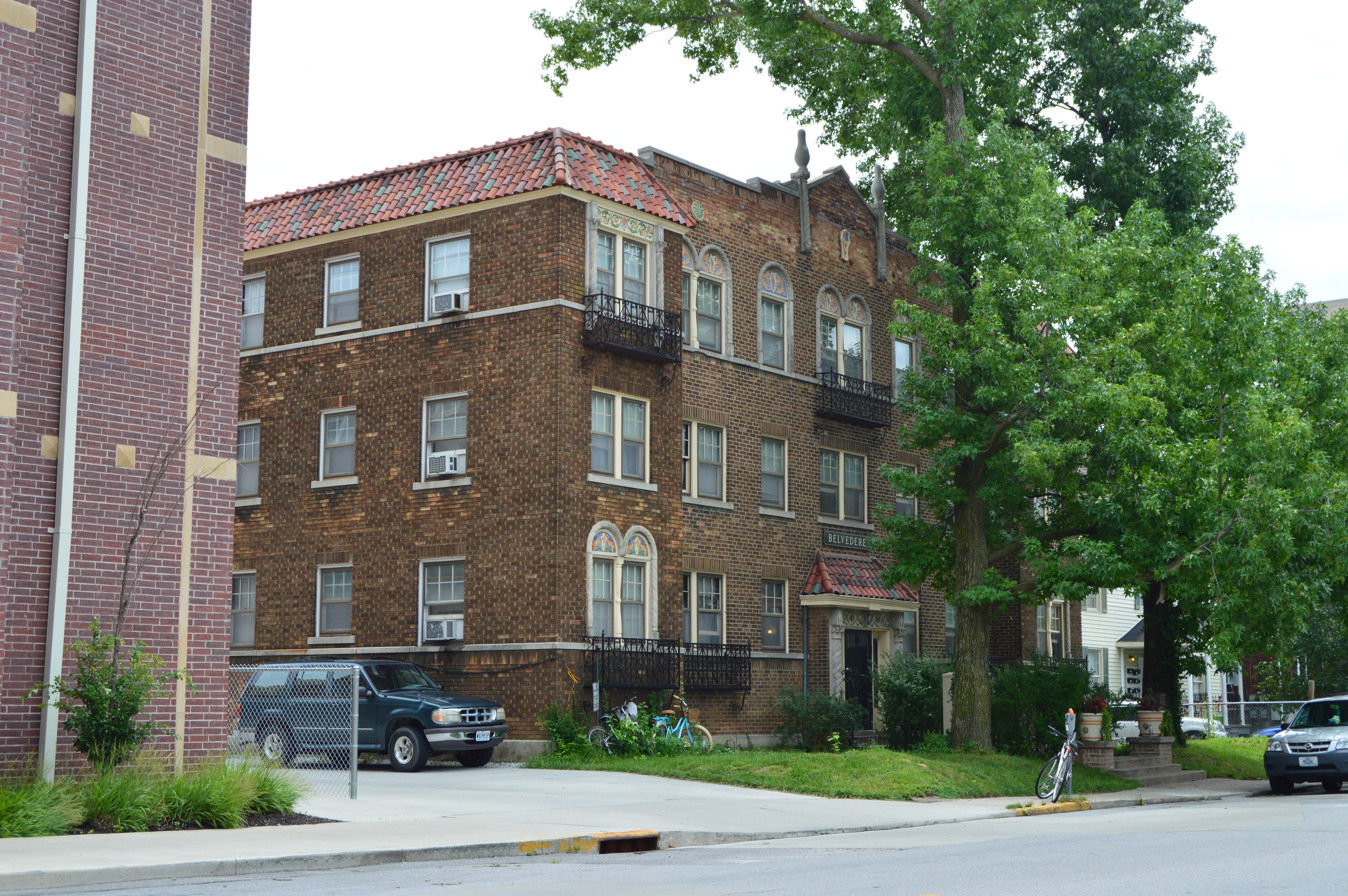
Belvedere Apartments in Columbia, Missouri

Belvedere Apartments is a well-preserved apartment building located at 206 Hitt Street in downtown Columbia, Missouri. Built in 1927, the building was designed by noted architect Nelle Peters. The building was added to Columbia's Notable Buildings List in 2008 and is a possible candidate for the National Register of Historic Places. As of 2014, the apartments are being rented by private individuals.
