= Little Red Riding Hood (1922 film) =

1922 film by Walt Disney

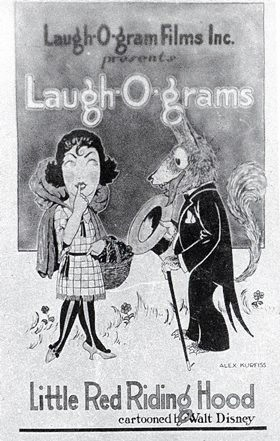
- Theatrical poster
- Directed by: Walt Disney
- Based on: Little Red Riding Hood by Charles Perrault and Brothers Grimm
- Produced by: Walt Disney
- Cinematography: Red Lyon
- Animation by: Rudolf Ising; Carman Maxwell; Ub Iwerks; Hugh Harman; Otto Walliman; Lorey Tague
- Color process: Black and white
- Production company: Laugh-O-Gram Studio
- Distributed by: Pictorial Clubs
- Release date: July 29, 1922
- Running time: 6:12
- Country: United States

The full short (unrestored)

Little Red Riding Hood is a 1922 American silent animated film directed by Walt Disney. It is a rendition of the traditional story of Little Red Riding Hood. The film is part of the Laugh-O-Grams series and Disney's directorial debut, though it is preceded by a 1921 newsreel produced as the studio's first work. Rather than using animation cels, it was made mostly by photographing inked lines on paper.

== Significance ==
The film was considered to be lost for many years and it was listed in 1980 on the American Film Institute's "10 Most Wanted Films for Archival Preservation". A print of the film was discovered by British collector David Wyatt in a London film library in 1998 and was restored the same year.

The film introduces the first appearance of Julius the Cat, who would become Disney's first named, recurring character. Julius would last appear in Alice the Beach Nut. A second American short film with the same title was also released in 1922 which starred Baby Peggy.

== See also ==
- List of rediscovered films
