= Raggedy Ann & Andy: A Musical Adventure =

1977 film by Richard Williams

- Theatrical release poster
- Directed by: Richard Williams
- Screenplay by: Patricia Thackray; Max Wilk
- Based on: Characters by Johnny Gruelle
- Produced by: Richard Horner; Stanley Sills
- Starring: Claire Williams; Didi Conn; Mark Baker
- Cinematography: Dick Mingalone (Live-action); Al Rezek (Animation)
- Edited by: Harry Chang; Lee Kent; Ken McIlwaine; Maxwell Seligman
- Music by: Joe Raposo
- Production companies: The Bobbs-Merrill Company; Lester Osterman Productions; Richard Williams Productions
- Distributed by: 20th Century Fox; ITT Inc.
- Release date: April 1, 1977
- Running time: 85 minutes
- Countries: United Kingdom; United States
- Language: English
- Budget: $4 million
- Box office: $1.35 million (worldwide rentals)

Raggedy Ann & Andy: A Musical Adventure is a 1977 animated musical fantasy film loosely adapted from the 1924 novel Raggedy Ann and Andy and the Camel with the Wrinkled Knees. It was directed by Richard Williams, produced by the Bobbs-Merrill Company, and released theatrically by 20th Century Fox. A 1941 short film had previously featured the Raggedy Ann and Andy characters created by Johnny Gruelle. The first feature-length animated musical comedy produced in the United States, the plot follows Raggedy Ann and Andy, who, along with other toys, live in the nursery of a little girl named Marcella. During Marcella's seventh birthday, Babette, from France, is introduced as the new doll from a large package. Meanwhile, the infatuated Captain Contagious kidnaps Babette in his pirate ship and escapes from the nursery. Ann and Andy must explore and find Babette in the Deep Deep Woods to save her.

The film began development when producer Richard Horner chose the characters from a conversation surrounding promotions of children's products. The Bobbs-Merrill Company became its financer, and the film was a stage musical and a live-action television special before it was decided to become an animated film. Director Williams controlled most of production, which lasted for more than two years, budgeting to the cost of $4 million. As a result, the release date was pushed back for an extra three months of work. Joe Raposo contributed all of the music and songs for the film. The film's promotional campaign cost $2 million.

Raggedy Ann & Andy: A Musical Adventure premiered on March 20, 1977, in nine major cities before it was generally released on April 1, 1977, in the United States. The film received mixed reviews from critics. Some critics lauded the animation, voice cast, and songs, while others criticized some of the characters and its writing. Since its release, there were a few home video releases and some television broadcasts of the film. It was adapted by the 1981 drama adaptation and the 1986 Broadway musical Raggedy Ann. In recent years, it has developed a cult following for its songs and characters.

== Plot ==
Marcella returns home and goes to her nursery playroom to put away her favorite doll, Raggedy Ann. When Marcella leaves, the toys come to life, and Ann tells them of the wonders of the outside world. She then shares that it is Marcella's seventh birthday, and the toys notice a large package in the corner. Marcella opens the present to reveal a beautiful bisque doll from Paris, France, named Babette. Ann and the other toys welcome Babette, but she is too homesick. Meanwhile, Captain Contagious notices Babette and he becomes immediately smitten. After tricking Ann into freeing him, he kidnaps Babette with his band of pirates and leaps out of the nursery window. Ann and Andy decide to rescue Babette.

Ann and Andy enter the Deep Deep Woods. As the dolls travel, they meet the Camel with the Wrinkled Knees, a blue stuffed animal who has been abandoned and hallucinates ghostly camels beckoning him to a home. Ann promises that once they find Babette, he may return with them. With Ann and Andy in tow, the Camel chases down the caravan and mindlessly rushes off a cliff. They find themselves in the Taffy Pit, where the Greedy lives. The Greedy explains that he feels unsatisfied despite endlessly eating. He thus attempts to take the candy heart inside Ann, but the toys successfully escape.

The toys then encounter the looniest knight Sir Leonard Looney, who welcomes them to Looney Land. Looney pursues the toys into the court of its monarch, King Koo Koo. Koo Koo laments his tiny stature and explains that he can only grow by laughing at other people. He intends to keep the toys as his prisoners, but they are able to distract him and escape on a boat. The furious king follows them with an enormous sea monster, Gazooks; as he finds hilarity in seeing heroes in trouble, Koo Koo intends to get the "last laugh" by having Gazooks tickle all the heroes with his many arms.

While sailing, Ann, Andy, and the Camel notice Contagious' ship, only to discover that Babette had become the new captain while imprisoning Contagious. When Ann tries to tell Babette to return, Babette is enraged and has the trio tied to the mast. Meanwhile, Contagious' parrot Queasy successfully unlocks the captain's shackles, allowing him to return above deck, free the others, and pledge his love for Babette. King Koo Koo and Gazooks then attack the ship and capture all but Ann and Babette. He subjects them to tickling, making the monarch swell to mammoth proportions by laughing. Babette begs for forgiveness, only for her and Ann to be captured and tickled. The dolls realize that King Koo Koo's inflated ego is "full of hot air," and Andy tells Queasy to pop him, which creates a massive explosion that sends them spiraling.

The following day, Marcella discovers the toys lying in her backyard. She returns all but the Camel to the playroom, where Babette apologizes for her actions and accepts Ann's offer of friendship and Contagious' affection. While in harmony, Ann notices the Camel through the window. The dolls welcome him to their family. The next day, Marcella finds the Camel among the dolls and hugs him tightly, accepting him.

== Cast ==
=== Live-action cast ===
- Claire Williams as Marcella, a 7-year-old girl who owns a playroom nursery.
- Joe Raposo (uncredited) as Joe the Bus Driver, who drops off Marcella from school at the beginning of the film.

=== Voice cast ===
- Didi Conn as Raggedy Ann, an innocent, kind rag doll. In April 1975, Conn visited the studio, thinking it was a "voice-over commercial." She was asked to sing a song by Richard Williams and Joe Raposo. Conn selected the song "Where is Love?" for the part. Although they loved it, they suggested acting more with her distinctive "gravelly" voice, so Conn sang the song again with her low register. Conn was chosen afterward. Conn had a cold with laryngitis during a few recording sessions for the film. While Conn was unhappy about her voice in "Home", Williams kept these recording sessions, as he thought that Conn's laryngitis had more emotion to her voice. Her main animators are Tissa David and Chrystal Russell. (Note: In the title sequence, the footnoted characters are animated by Richard Williams.) (Note: In the musical number of "I'm No Girl's Toy", the footnoted characters are mostly animated by Richard Williams.) David was hired by Williams to demonstrate an animation test of 25 seconds for the film. By the end of January 1975, she agreed to do so. David became one of the first women to animate a leading character in a major film.
- Mark Baker as Raggedy Andy, a spunky, confident rag doll who is Raggedy Ann's younger brother. Baker was chosen as the voice of Raggedy Andy, as he proved to have a "boyish, spunky voice" they needed. His main animator is Tissa David.
- Niki Flacks as Babette, a French doll from Paris, France, of whom Marcella received for her seventh birthday. Her main animators are Hal Ambro and Richard Williams.
- George S. Irving as Captain Contagious, the sneezing pirate captain who kidnaps Babette as his miracle and his prize. His main animator is Charlie Downs.
- Arnold Stang as Queasy, the parrot who serves as Captain Contagious' sidekick. His main animator is Art Vitello.
- Marty Brill as King Koo Koo, the monarch and ruler of the Loony Land. His main animator is Gerry Chiniquy.
- Fred Stuthman as the Camel with the Wrinkled Knees, a lonely blue camel who is abandoned in the Deep Deep Woods. Raposo noticed Stuthman from the "demo room" due to his similarity to the Camel. He entered the studio and was asked to read the script and sing a song. Stuthman once admitted that he ad-libbed the line "Look at mah poor knees!" while recording the pirate scene. His main animator is Art Babbitt. He took several weeks to develop the Camel's three personalities before he designed him on paper. Babbitt divided the design of the character into three personalities: a "pretty dumb" back end, a "little bit smarter" front end, and a head.
- Joe Silver as the Greedy, a taffy pit that eats sweets and candy. Silver was chosen by casting director Howard Feuer to play the Greedy. His main animator is Emery Hawkins.
- Alan Sues as Sir Leonard Loony (The Loony Knight), the server of the Loony Land. His main animator is John Kimball.
- Paul Dooley as Gazooks, a sea monster that is accompanied by King Koo Koo. His main animator is George Bakes.
- Mason Adams as Grandpa, a doll that advises whether Marcella is coming in or out of the playroom nursery. His main animator is John Bruno. (Note: Besides Raggedy Ann and the Sockworm, the footnoted characters are also animated by Chrystal Russell in the musical number of "I Look and What Do I See?".)
- Allen Swift as Maxi Fix-it, the repairer of the toys. His main animator is Spencer Peel.
- Hetty Galen as Suzy Pincushion, the sewer of the toys. Her main animator is Spencer Peel.
- Margery Gray and Lynne Stuart as the Twin Pennies, the toys that performed in brief musical numbers towards the beginning of the film. Their main animator is Gerry Chiniquy. He has once admitted that animating the Twin Pennies was a challenge since their dances had "eighth beats and a rock feel".
- Ardith Kaiser as Turvy-Topsy, the toy clown. Her main animator is Spencer Peel.
- Sheldon Harnick as Barney Beanbag, a beanbag with a painted face. The animator for the character is Spencer Peel.
  - He also voices the Sockworm, a toy sock in a shoe. His main animator is Chrystal Russell.
- Richard Williams and Joe Raposo (uncredited) as the Pirates, all of whom aboard the ship with Captain Contagious.

In addition, all the cast provided the voices of the Loonies. Their animator is Grim Natwick.

== Production ==
=== Development and writing ===
After the success of the live-action television adaptation of The Littlest Angel, producer Richard Horner was looking for a similar project. One day, Horner was in a conversation surrounding the promotions of an independent merchandiser of children's products during lunch. Raggedy Ann & Andy was chosen, and after it got popularity from a Friars Club roast for Johnny Carson, he acquired permission to The Bobbs-Merrill Company to begin the project. When the project was greenlit, it started out as a stage musical before it was transformed into a live-action television special for Hallmark Hall of Fame named Rag Dolly: The Raggedy Ann Musical. Horner brought in writer Pat Thackray for permission to research Johnny Gruelle's material and write a live-action script as a treatment. Afterwards, Pat Thackray and Max Wilk wrote the script for the special. They included new characters in the screenplay, including Captain Contagious and the Greedy. Considerations for Raggedy Ann include Liza Minnelli and Goldie Hawn, while a consideration star for Raggedy Andy was Dick Van Dyke. Over time, composer Joe Raposo decided that a live-action television special involving Raggedy Ann and Andy would be too unbelievable. The project was then transformed into an animated project, leading to Hallmark being dropped from the project. The team were amused about the idea, as they were convinced that the technique was the correct path to follow. As a result, the team decided to make a film based on the characters instead of a television special. Shortly, the company accepted the agreement to finance the film.

In late 1973, Lester Osterman asked Richard Williams to produce an animated film based on the characters. He initially declined and recommended John Hubley instead, although Osterman sent the script and a tape of music with Williams overnight. Williams called his fellow friend Tony Walton about Osterman while preparing for the script. As he read the script, Williams was surprisingly amazed, and he left it loose to allow for visual development. Williams brought the script to Walton and prepared for himself to listen to the score at 2:00 pm in the morning. He immediately became amused about the score, calling that this could be "extremely good". Negotiations soon began between Richard Williams Productions and the Lester Osterman studio, but the former was rejected. In 1974, Osterman called and asked Williams to reconsider supervising the full-time production of the film, but Williams once again declined. Raposo then called and told him to travel to New York City and socialize with the team. The team traveled, and Williams hired Abe Levitow to direct the film, which amazed him more. Raposo and Williams traveled back to New York City afterwards. Shortly after Levitow's death, Williams was pressured to replace him as the director of the film. Williams pitched the idea to Universal Pictures and Warner Bros., but they declined. Williams pursued 20th Century-Fox president Alan Ladd Jr. to finance the film. During March and April 1975, Williams and Raposo worked together in London and New York City to polish the final version of the screenplay for recording sessions.

=== Designs ===
The designs were based on the drawings from the first four of Gruelle's books. In January 1975, Williams called animator Corny Cole with an offer to design the characters, layouts, storyboards, and color-keying. Cole worked closely with Pat Thackray, sketching the dolls in the toy section of the Museum of the City of New York, while Williams cut out the illustrations by Gruelle as "reference sheets". Cole later returned to Los Angeles and worked for three weeks on a color presentation that would be shown to the company at the end of February. The meeting would serve to introduce Richard Williams as the director of the final film. Despite his job, Cole only laid out a half of the film; the rest of the film was laid out and storyboarded by Gerald Potterton. Cole worked on its plans and storyboards for three months. He left when his contract expired in the summer of 1976.

The Greedy was the first character to be designed for the film. Corny Cole originally envisioned the character as a Giant Spider-like creature with various types of hands. After its pencil-test by Emery Hawkins in the fall of that year, Cole was unsatisfied with the results. In June 1976, the animation crew started testing out the designs by setting up the characterizations of the main characters. Their work would be served as character models of the film.

For the live-action sequences, the dolls were built by four designers. The Camel, the Twin Pennies, and Captain Contagious and the ship in the globe were built by Frederick Nidah, with the Grandpa doll being rebuilt. Raggedy Ann and Andy, Topsy Turvy, and the Sockworm were built by Richard Williams' mother. Bill Davis built Barney Beanbag and Suzy Pincushion, and Judy Sutcliff fashioned the Babette doll.

=== Casting and recording ===
Raposo and Williams chose the opposite tradition of voice acting backed by Horner. Howard Feuer suggested celebrities to voice the characters, such as Tammy Grimes as Raggedy Ann and Jack Gilford as the Camel, but Horner decided that the characters would be voiced by not-widely known actors instead. The film had five auditions from Raposo for the voice cast. The first audition was held on May 1, 1975, in Mediasound Studios. During the day, Williams rushed to the studio, worrying about the voices of the characters at the time. For several characters such as Captain Contagious and Suzy Pincushion, choosing the voices for them was a "crucial problem". Over a hundred actors auditioned for sixteen parts. For the live-action sequences, Williams thought that casting Marcella was a "thorny problem", as he needed a girl who could impose a 12-hour schedule. He selected his daughter, Claire Williams, for the role of Marcella. Williams' account dated on January 2, 1976, implied the pressure for Marcella's voice to be dubbed. Claire Williams' original voice was later dubbed for the film.

The voices for the cast were recorded on May 29 and 30, 1975, with four additional days in July at Mediasound, Inc. According to Didi Conn, all of the cast were in the recording studio on the first day of recording, with the exception of Joe Silver, who was working on the television series Fay at the time. Joe Raposo was a temporary substitute until it was replaced by Silver's recording sessions when he voiced him for a day. Some lines took over 24 takes for a line of dialogue, though the sessions were relaxed. The script would be revised when a voice cast does not feel comfortable on the lines. The final recording session involved Didi Conn and Mark Baker singing "Candy Hearts" together. The session only took a single take for the song to be finished.

=== Filming ===
The live action sequences were filmed in Boonton, New Jersey, with the house at 224 Cornelia Street serving as Marcella's home. The location was found by set and costume designer William Mickley. On October 14, 1975, the location was repaired. Mickley and a pair of scenic artists tore rooms apart, painted and wallpapered Marcella's bedroom, built a ceiling grid for the lights, dug a backyard pool, and enhanced the autumnal foliage by spraying the leaves red and gold and brought more leaves from nearby neighborhoods.

Principal photography was held on the week of October 20, 1975. Filming involved a crew of 35 people and took four days from early in the morning to midnight for the scenes to be finished. Williams shot the film quickly, with no more than five or six takes for each scene of the film. Williams' love interest at the time, Margaret French, and his wife at the time, Lois Catherine Steuart, watched Claire Williams to keep her well-supplied with her favorite orange sherbet without being exhausted. After shooting was finished, the house was restored to its original condition for two weeks.

=== Animation ===
Williams' idea was to employ a full range of animation without looking like it was animated by Disney. He spent a week researching the original illustrations by Gruelle. He eventually decided to base the animation on his work. As a result, the animation was challenged to compete with Disney films at the time. Eventually, his goal for the animation is to have a character who can change his personality. European .004 celluloids were considered to be used by Williams, but they would cause issues if weather changes or too much paint was applied. The animation was later decided to compromise with Mylar-based cels from the Midwest.

Full animation started in February 1976. Most of the animators left by May 1976. Approximately half of a million ideas and story sketches were drawn, another half of a million finished drawings were included in the finalized film, and approximately 1,000 backgrounds were drawn and used for the film. Some sequences were drawn by one frame instead of the usual two frames. Over time, cameraman Al Rezek designed and built the Xerox processor and camera that outlined the original paper drawings directly onto cels. Animation drawings were inspected by Xerox planners before they are Xeroxed to figure out whether the mechanics used were correct. The approved animation would then be shipped from two independent companies in Hollywood to an art department in New York City. The animation was painted by more than 45 individuals that included men and women in the art department managed by Ida Greenberg. Some characters had a lot of color keys, including Suzy Pincushion and Topsy-Turvy. The Greedy faced a problem with painting, as Greenberg stated that the "big masses of taffy took an awful long time to paint, and it was a 'wall-to-wall' painting." Approximately 85,000 cels were painted to complete the film. The animation cels used for the film were larger than most animated films due to the cel measurements for the Panavision camera.

The film was shot in 35 mm Panavision film for "greater impact and design quality". This was one of the technical problems that needed attention for the film, as it received lots of complaints from the crew who has not worked on it prior to the film. At the time, the Panavision lens were not acquired until September 1975. Williams would insist Polaroid filters to be placed over the camera lens to refrain dirt and scratches from the animated cels. Two sequences had to be rendered with black backgrounds, which cause cel abrasion problems. The animation was taken with two cameras for two shifts in day and night by Rezek and his small crew. Some shots were shot in multiplane, including the "Candy Hearts" sequence. For the special star effect in the "Blue" sequence, a black card with stars with two sets of lines underneath and its "strobe" effect were used to flicker the star. Its process for the effect was time-consuming, as it required four separate camera runs of the same footage. By the final week of December 1976, most of the animators and assistant animators were finished with their tasks.

=== Production difficulties ===
Williams challenged for the film to be true to the expectations of the audience. As the film production continued, story sketches and art work were arriving slowly for use in the Leica reel. Williams flew to Canada for a screening held in mid-December 1975 with his fellow friend, Gerry Potterton. Reactions and consensus were generally positive on the screening. Williams then traveled to London and spent his brief break there. On January 2, 1976, Williams wrote an account of his mind, demanding that 23–28 minutes of the Leica reel should be cut from the original duration of 108 minutes of the film. The scenes included the scene involving the Greedy, (Note: Several dialogue of the Greedy originally from the Leica reel were cut.) the Loony Land scene, and the scene involving Gazooks tickling the dolls.

Eventually, like many of his other projects, the film went over time and budget, including the art department in New York City, which was the biggest threat to the deadline due to its "slow, careful natured process". He would spend two weeks in Los Angeles, two weeks in New York City, and approximately ten days in London to attend his own studio. The film was finished by December 31, 1976. The overall production originally cost $1.750 million before it was raised to $4 million.

=== Music ===
Raggedy Ann & Andy: A Musical Adventure (Original Motion Picture Soundtrack)

Soundtrack album by various artists
- Released: 1977
- Recorded: May & July 1975
- Studio: Mediasound (New York City)
- Genre: Soundtrack
- Length: 44:52
- Label: Columbia Records
- Producer: Joe Raposo

Joe Raposo composed the score and wrote songs for the film. During the early stage of development, he studied Gruelle's material before he processed on the songs, music, and lyrics. The first song written for the film was "I Look and What Do I See", a song about Raggedy Ann's innocence on the "good and pretty things in life". Out of the 24 songs written for the film, only 14 were included in the final cut. The deleted songs included Raggedy Andy's solo "I Like Rasslin", a song for Raggedy Ann and Marcella, a dance number "The Raggedy Rag", "Fifi", (Note: Babette was originally named Fifi in the early stage of development.) and the anthem for the Loonies of Loonyland. They were all rejected before they were recorded. "Blue" was originally going to be deleted twice to be substituted by a song about a Cookie Grant and from Williams' artistic direction, but it was later kept in the final film. The score involved a sixty-piece orchestra and was prerecorded before its recording sessions were recorded.

An official soundtrack was released on vinyl, cassette tape and 8-track tape by Columbia Records in 1977. The soundtrack was in stereo compared to the film, which was in mono. The soundtrack received generally positive reviews. Billboard chose the track "Rag Dolly" as the album's highlight, reviewing the album as an "attractive disk" led by the team. A.H. Weiler of The New York Times commented that "Candy Hearts" is "pleasantly tuneful." R.C. Staab criticized the singing performances of the characters, but recalled that "Rag Dolly" is a "catchy number in the style of Scott Joplin." Jay Alan Quintril stated that the songs are of the "Tin Pan Alley school of composition" and fit the "charm and warmth and sheer joy of the entire project." Barbara Corrado Pope commented that "["I'm No Girl's Toy"] seems ill-placed in a movie that [would] probably have wide appeal for little girls."

==== Track listing ====
All tracks are written by Joe Raposo.

No.	Title	Performer(s)	Length
1.	"Main Title — Rag Dolly"		1:37
2.	"Where'd You Go?"	Margery Gray & Lynne Stuart	1:18
3.	"I Look and What Do I See"	Didi Conn & Cast	2:55
4.	"I'm No Girl's Toy"	Mark Baker & Cast	2:46
5.	"Rag Dolly"	Didi Conn, Mark Baker, & Cast	3:50
6.	"Poor Babette"	Niki Flacks	1:36
7.	"A Miracle"	George S. Irving & Arnold Stang	1:15
8.	"The Abduction & Ho-Yo"	George S. Irving & Cast	2:38
9.	"Candy Hearts"	Didi Conn & Mark Baker	5:26
10.	"Blue"	Fred Stuthman	4:43
11.	"Camel's Mirage"	Cast	0:56
12.	"I Never Get Enough"	Joe Silver	3:17
13.	"I Love You"	Alan Sues	1:41
14.	"Hail To Our Glorious King"	Cast (Note: All of the cast performed the song.)	1:04
15.	"It's Not Easy Being King"	Marty Brill	2:18
16.	"Hooray For Me"	Niki Flacks & Cast	0:45
17.	"You're My Friend"	George S. Irving & Arnold Stang	2:09
18.	"The Plot Thickens"		3:08
19.	"The Tickling and The Last Laugh"		1:30
20.	"Home"	Didi Conn, Mark Baker, & Cast	5:46

== Release ==
The film was originally planned for a release on March 1, 1975, but was later scheduled for December 1976. By April 1976, the film was moved to early 1977 for an extra three months of work. According to a two-page advertisement for Variety from December 8, 1976, it was estimated that over 70 million viewers watched Didi Conn and Mark Baker as Raggedy Ann and Andy dancing to "Rag Dolly" for two minutes in the Macy's Thanksgiving Day Parade. The promotional campaign for the film reportedly cost $2 million, with hundreds of manufacturers licensed to make more than 500 products. The film premiered on March 20, 1977, in nine major cities. It was later released on April 1, 1977, in 400 theaters in the United States, with approximately 40 theaters opened in New York City. The film was a box-office failure.

=== Home video ===
The film was first released on RCA CED Videodisc, VHS, and Betamax by MGM/CBS Home Video in 1982. It was followed by a VHS release in 1985 by Playhouse Video (in association of CBS/Fox Video) and 1992 by Fox Video. The film never received an official DVD release nor a Blu-ray release.

=== Broadcasts ===
The film aired on Disney Channel for six days in June and July 1988, then on November 27, 1989.

== Reception ==
=== Initial release ===
"If you're a musical fan, you'll love Raggedy Ann & Andy: A Musical Adventure."

— Keith Jones, Register Staff

"Raggedy Ann & Andy is a natural for kids from 3 to 12 and their parents won't be bored, either John Gruelle's winsome pair come to life with accomplished animation supervised by Richard Williams. The songs by Joe Raposo are run of the Broadway mill and humor is sparse, but the characters brilliantly realized. Especially Greedy, a self-consuming lava pit of chocolate and other sweets."

— Bob Thomas, Associated Press

Upon its initial release, Raggedy Ann & Andy: A Musical Adventure received mixed reviews from critics. The film was praised for its animation, voice cast, and songs. Film critic Roger Ebert stated that he "enjoyed [the film] fully, without the slightest need to revert to my childhood." He praised the animation and concluded that "[children will] enjoy Raggedy Ann anytime." Jay Alan Quantril called it the "most delightful film to be released in many a year." He praised the animation as "all done with such artistry and integrity" and the songs as "memorable if a little less than inspired." Rob Edelman commented that it is a "captivating film for children", comparing the film to the "best of Disney" and praising the "imaginative" animation, direction, screenplay, and "pleasant if memorable" songs. Candice Russell of Knight-Ridder Newspapers was favorable about the film, stating that the film has a "psychedelic array of colors, delightfully goofy characters, an ingenious story filled with danger and escape, a score by Joe Raposo, and humor sure to please mom and dad as well as the kids."

Suzanne Bowers of Film Information called the film's animation "excellent", the songs "easy for all ages to take", the music "catchy", and the film's mood "buoyant". Film Feedback from the Communication Commission, National Council of Churches stated that "children and adults who are young at heart will find much to enjoy and think about in [the film]." Peter Schillaci of Mass Media Newsletter stated that "creative style, gorgeous color, clear action, and some fine voices make this one children's film which won't put adults to sleep." A.H. Weiler of The New York Times commented that the film is "both a rare and welcome addition to the entertainment offered pre-teens these days." Gay Zieger praised the animation and music score of the film. The Marin Motion Picture and TV Council reviewed that the characters made this film a "rare treat". Bob Thomas of Associated Press praised the animation and characters in his "At the Movies" review. R.C. Staab praised the "good" animation and "pleasant" songs in his review. Keith Jones of Register Staff called the music "bright and catchy" and the animation "superb".

Other aspects were criticized, including some of the characters and its screenplay. Lou Gaul of Courier Times Entertainment was mostly favorable about the film, describing the production as "full of marvelous sights, pleasant sounds, and sparkling color." Although he criticized the film's ending for "fraying slightly", he praised the film's balance, music score, and production. David Sterritt of Christian Science Monitor called the film "the most unusual family-fun find of the season." He criticized the film's pace, but recalled that "once the plot is underway, it contains some cleverly conceived and brightly drawn situations." Judith Martin of Los Angeles Times and The Washington Post called the film "pretty" and "tuneful", but criticized the plot as a "vague chase, peopled by formless villains." Barbara Corrado Pope was mixed about the characters in the film, praising the Greedy, Sir Looney Knight, and King Koo Koo as "characters guaranteed to delight children", but criticized Raggedy Ann and Andy as "obnoxious" and a "sexist updating of the story". Howard Beckerman gave the film a mixed review, praising the "ambitious" animation, but criticized the story and the "overabundance" songs of the film, calling the latter that only of a few songs were "memorable". He also criticized its characters Marcella and Babette, stating that the former "don't present any conflict or suspense for the audience to be concerned about" while he called the latter "uninteresting".

=== Retrospective ===
Retrospectively, the film continued to receive mixed reviews. Tim Brayton of Antagony & Ecstasy gave the film a score of 7 out of 10, calling the film "rare" and "totally essential and beautiful". Greg Ehrbar of Animation Research called the film a "bold, spectacular enterprise", praising the "mammoth talents" and its animation, particularly the Greedy sequence. Another reviewer from Animation Research, Michael Lyons, praised the film's animation as "full, kinetic, mesmerizing". According to Halliwell's Film Guide: "[In this] attractive fully animated cartoon feature [...] only the central story is lacking in pace and humor". In the book Masters of Animation, author John Grant stated that the film was "filed to the brim with all kinds of excellences." Grant praised the animation, but criticized the overabundance of "largely mediocre songs".

Ray Kosarin of Asifa East stated that the film is "important and interesting", criticizing the story as "sleepy, sugary" and "fundamentally weak", the plot as "underbaked", and characters as "unmotivating", but praised the animation and its production as "colorful, often-exquisite". In the book The Scarecrow Video Movie Guide, reviewer Bryan Theiss stated that the film's animation was "fun to stare at the details of the drawings." He described the story as "unabashedly juvenile" and the songs as "saccharine". He also criticized the Twin Pennies as "creepy" and the Greedy as "disgusting". Sandra Brennan of AllMovie gave the film two out of five stars. Tom Hutchinson of Radio Times also gave the film two out of five stars, criticizing the characters for having "appeal but no story to tell that will interest children above the age of five."

== Stage adaptations ==
=== 1981 drama adaptation ===
In 1981, Thackray reworked the story for Raggedy Ann & Andy, a play which is available to license for performances at schools and community theatres in the United States and Canada.

=== 1986 Broadway musical ===
In 1984, Raposo and playwright William Gibson crafted a much darker variation of the story, first called Raggedy Ann and then briefly retitled Rag Dolly. Raposo retained two songs ("Rag Dolly" and "Blue") and reworked the opening title theme into a song called "Gingham and Yarn". The plot was completely different and follows the dying young Marcella, who goes on a journey with Raggedy Ann and her friends to meet the Doll Doctor, who can mend her broken heart. This version ran in three theatres (including one in Moscow) before landing with a thud on Broadway on October 16, 1986, at the Nederlander Theatre. After five performances and 15 previews, it was closed on October 19. The Broadway show received negative reviews, and it was considered a failure. It developed a cult following from bootleg recordings.

== See also ==
- List of animated feature-length films
- List of 20th Century Studios theatrical animated feature films

== Works cited ==
- Cinemaker, John (1977). The Animated Raggedy Ann & Andy (Paperback ed.). The Bobbs-Merrill Company. ISBN 0672523302.
