= Olivier Cotte =

French writer and film director (born 1963)

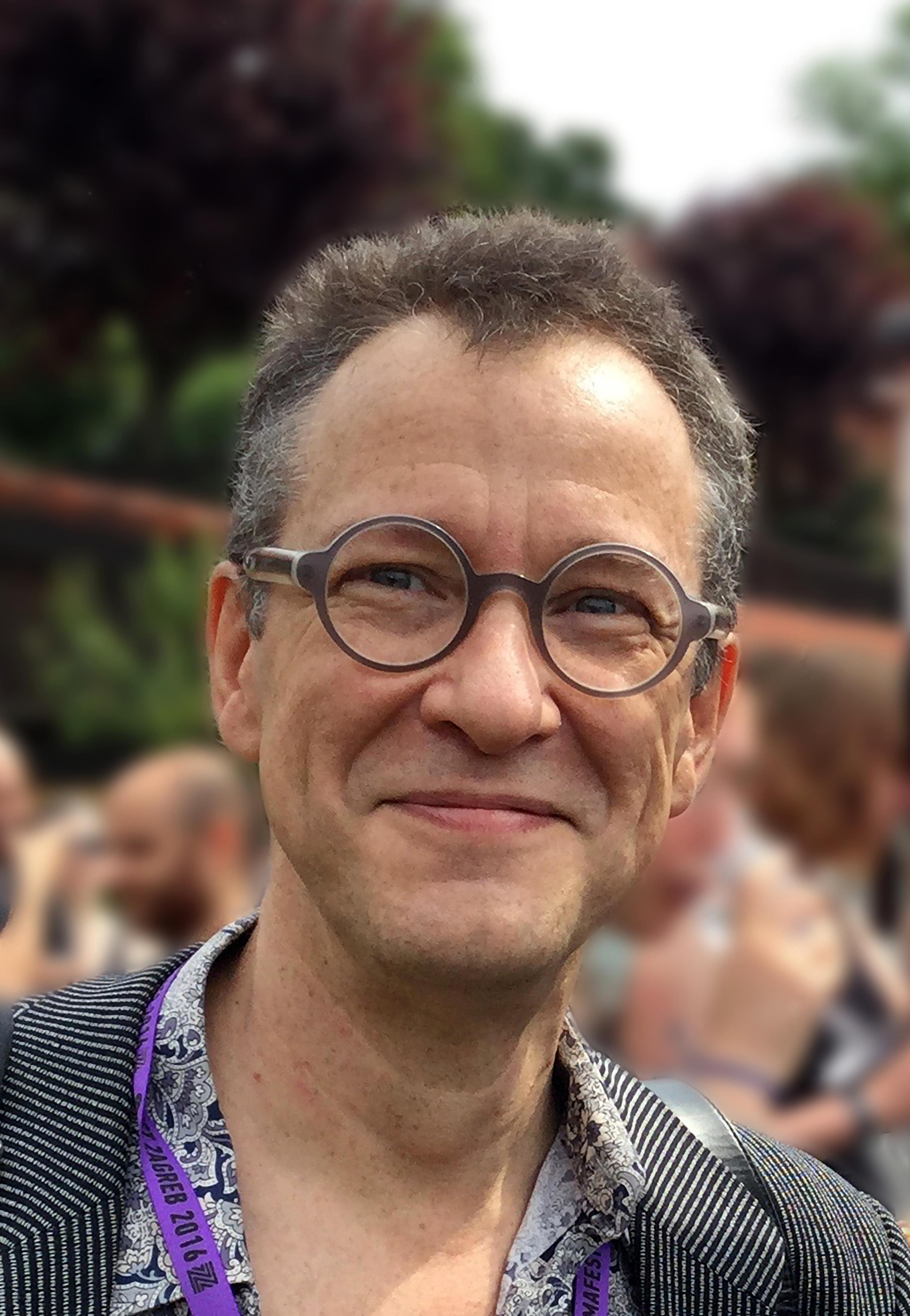
- Olivier Cotte au festival Animafest Zagreb 2016
- Born: 20 June 1963 (age 63); Soisy-sous-Montmorency, France
- Occupations: Animation historian, graphic novelist, novelist, play writer and director
- Writing career
- Language: French, English
- Website: olivier-cotte.com

Olivier Cotte (born 20 June 1963) is a French writer, graphic novel scriptwriter, animation historian, illustrator, and a director.

== Biography ==
Born into a family of artists, Olivier Cotte studied piano, classical dance and fine arts in parallel with his philosophy degree. Passionate about animation, he made his first film at the age of 14. Fascinated by the aesthetics of John Cage and Merce Cunningham, he first wanted to become a contemporary dancer, but then enrolled in the fine arts and the Sorbonne in cinema and literature.

=== Beginnings in the cinema ===
Olivier Cotte has worked for 15 years in the film and video industry as a director, computer graphics designer and special effects director for advertising, TV wraps, credits, clips, short films (Le canard à l'orange, 2002, by Patrick Bokanowski for example).

He is a computer graphics designer or responsible for special effects for feature films, in particular for Wim Wenders (Until the End of the World), Roman Polanski (Death and the Maiden), Costa-Gavras (Mad City), Bob Swaim (The Climb), Josiane Balasko (Un grand cri d'amour), Jaco van Dormael (The Eighth Day), Leos Carax (Pola X), and Mathieu Kassovitz (Assassin(s)).

He has directed several short films, mainly in animation or mixed techniques, including Terra Incognita (1995) in which he directs Michael Lonsdale.

=== Historian and theorist of animation cinema ===
Since 2002, he has devoted himself to writing fiction and working as a historian of animation cinema. He teacher at Gobelins, l'école de l'image from 2002 to 2014. He is the artistic and technical director of the opening shorts of the Annecy festival from 2002 to 2012. He also teaches at ESAG Penninghen, Esra, and abroad (Germany, China, Taiwan...). He collaborates with the reading committee of the Centre national du cinéma et de l'image animée and for many film festivals and cinematheques. From 2002 to 2012, he wrote the tributes to the missing of the year for the Annecy festival.

He wrote many articles for different magazines dedicated to cinema, image and computer science, then several books dedicated to animation film including an encyclopedia 100 ans de cinéma d'animation and Le grand livre des techniques d’animation, monographs dedicated to filmmakers (David Ehrlich, Georges Schwizgebel, Walt Disney) and Georges Méliès, a book of study and interviews with directors awarded an Oscar. He has also translated the animator's bible The Animator's Survival Kit by Richard Williams and several technical books.

In 2012, he received an Award for outstanding contribution to animation studies at the World Festival of Animated Film - Animafest Zagreb.

=== Screenwriter and author around the script ===
Olivier Cotte had been the scriptwriter of a TV series Mr. TiVi in 1985, and had published some short stories, but it is from 2008 that he wrote several comics. With Jules Stromboni at the drawing, he published Le futuriste, mixing science fiction and fantasy, followed by two adaptations for the Casterman-Rivage collection: L'ultime défi de Sherlock Holmes and L'épouvantail. The post-apocalyptic universe will be developed with Xavier Coste for Le lendemain du monde. He's also a playwright and novelist. In a more humorous register; he releases with Martin Viot Memento Maurice at Editions du Long Bec in 2019.

Olivier Cotte develops in his scenarios a predilection for imaginary universes, in particular science fiction and fantasy. This interest also leads him to collaborate with the Festival of Utopiales through evening classes and round tables.

His passion for storytelling led him to write a screenwriting method, Writing for Film and Television, followed by Adapting a Book for Film and Television, Creating Characters for Films and Series, and above all Fiction(s) Maîtrisez les outils de la narration moderne, and to teach this subject in several schools. He's also a script-doctor.

He has also translated in French Robert McKee's Dialogue: the Art of Verbal Action for Stage, Page and Screen, Character: The Art of Role and Cast Design for Page, Stage, and Screen, Action: The Art of Excitement for Screen, Page, and Game, and edited Story: Substance, Structure, Style and the Principles of Screenwriting by the same author.

== Work ==
=== Graphic novels ===
- Le futuriste, (drawings by Jules Stromboni), Casterman, 2008
- L'ultime défi de Sherlock Holmes, (drawings by Jules Stromboni), Casterman, 2010.
- L'épouvantail, (drawings by Jules Stromboni), Casterman, 2012. Official selection Festival d'Angoulême 2013.
- Et si..., (drawings by Marion Delannoy) in Genre & Question féminine. Edition L’Oeuf, 2017.
- Le lendemain du monde, (drawings by Xavier Coste). Casterman, 2017.
- Memento Maurice, (drawings by Martin Viot). Editions du Long Bec, 2019.
- Géostratégix, Un monde de jeux, (co scriptwriting with Tommy, text by Pascal Boniface). Editions Dunod, 2024.
- Cinéphilix, une histoire du cinéma en BD, (drawings by Marie-Sophie Moreau). Editions Dunod, 2024.
- Les garçons de la rue Panisperna, (script-doctoring of the Jean-François Chanson's script), Editions Dunod, 2025.

=== Theater plays ===
- Anamnèse de la chair, in Anthologie des Utopiales. Éditions ActuSF, 2018.
- Sequelles. 2021.

=== Novels ===
- La momie qui aimait les pizzas et les jeux vidéo. Editions Leha, 2021.
- Le Bracelet. Editions La Musardine, 2026.

=== Short stories ===
- La prison, 1992
- Intersection-dissection, 1992
- Naître ou ne pas naître, 1992
- Petit traité du vide entre les étoiles, 1992
- La tarte aux pommes, 1992
- Ciel pur, 1992
- Le port, 1993
- Prise en passant, in Anthology 42, compiled by Jeanne-A Debats, Éditions Parchemins & Traverses, 2015.
- A la masse, in Anthologie Utop' jeunesse, Éditions ActuSF, 2021.
- Dissociation de malfaiteurs (cowritten with Jeanne-A Debats), in Anthologie Alter ego Imaginales. Editions Diable Vauvert, 2026.

=== Screenwriting methods ===
- Écrire pour le cinéma et la télévision : Structure du scénario, outils et nouvelles techniques d'écriture créative. Editions Dunod, 2014.
- Adapter un livre pour le cinéma et la télévision - De l'oeuvre originale au scénario : roman, théâtre, biographie, bande dessinée. Editions Armand Colin, 2020.
- Créer des personnages de films et de séries. Editions Armand Colin, 2022.
- Fiction(s). Editions Armand Colin, 2025.

=== On Animated cinema ===
- Il était une fois le dessin animé, an encyclopedia about worldwide animation. Foreword by Jean-Claude Carrière. Dreamland, 2001, (out of print).
- David Ehrlich, citizen of the world, bilingual (English/French) monograph. Dreamland, 2002. ISBN 2-910027-80-5
- Utiliser After Effects pour émuler une multiplane traditionnelle in Les cahiers du designer; les cahiers de Gobelins, l'école de l'image, collective work. Editions Eyrolles, 2003.
- Georges Schwizgebel, animated paintings, trilingual (English/French/German) monograph. Heuwinkel, 2004. ISBN 3-906410-18-8
- Réaliser un film sur After Effects in Les cahiers du designer; After-Effects, collective work. Editions Eyrolles, 2004. Translated in espagnol: Conseguir animaciones y efectos especiales. Editions CEAC tiempoLibre, 2005.
- Chapters Le cinéma d’animation andt La typographie in Dictionnaire mondial des images, collective work. Nouveau Monde éditions, 2006.
- B is for Bordo, bilingual (English/Croatian) monograph, collective work. SKD Prosvjeta, Zagreb, 2006.
- Secrets of Oscar-winning Animation: Behind the scenes of 13 classic short animations. Focal Press, 2007. ISBN 978-0-240-52070-4. In French: Les Oscars du film d'animation. Eyrolles, 2006. In Japanese: コマ撮りアニメーションの秘密―オスカー獲得13作品の制作現場と舞台裏. Editions Graphic-Sha, 2008. In corean: 오스카 애니메이션 올리비에 코트 | 역자: 나호원 | 다빈치. In Spanish: Los Oscars de dibujos animados, Ediciones Omega 2009.
- The beginnings of the Asifa in 50th Asifa Anniversary, The Animation Art and The History of Asifa, collectif. Asifa Publication (in English), 2011.
- Travaux pratiques avec After Effects. Editions Dunod, 2011.
- Mieux comprendre After Effects in Savoir tout faire en animation 2D et 3D, collective work. Editions Oracom, 2011.
- Michaela Pavlatova in Animating the Unconscious, Desire, Sexuality and Animation, collective work. Wallflower Press, 2012.
- Les grandes fonctions d’After Effects in Savoir tout faire en vidéo: le Motion Design, collective work. Editions Oracom, 2012.
- 100 ans de cinéma d'animation, encyclopedia about worldwide animation. Éditions Dunod, 2015. Second edition 2023, foreword by Marc Caro. Translated in Chinese: 百年世界动画电影史; 2021.
- French chapter writer in Animation - A World History by Giannalberto Bendazzi. Focal Press, 2015.
- Rowing Across the Atlantic by Jean-François Laguionie in 40 Years of Ottawa: Collected Essays on Award-Winning Animation, collective work (in English). Ottawa festival edition, 2016.
- Filmographie animée in Sciences & fictions à Peyresq, Citoyennetés spéculatives, collective work. Editions du Somnium, 2016.
- Tim Burton and the Animated Film in Tim Burton : A Cinema of Transformations, collective work (in English). Presses universitaires de la Méditerranée, 2018.
- Le grand livre des techniques du cinéma d'animation, Foreword by Peter Lord. Éditions Dunod, 2018. Second edition, 2024.
- L'animation engagée in Less is more, collective work. Festival de musiques nouvelles, Philharmonie Luxembourg, 2019.
- Repères biographiques in Georges Schwizgebel, filmonographie, collective work. Monographie bilingue. La cinquième couche, 2020.
- Evolution and formal style in Portuguese animation in Reframing Portuguese cinema in the 21th Century, collective work. Curtas Metragens, 2020.
- Walt Disney, l'homme qui rêvait d'être un enfant. Editions Perrin, 2024.

=== On cinema ===
- La vidéo de A à Z: réalisez vos films comme un pro! Compétence Micro, 2007. In Spanish: Vídeo de la A à la Z: Crea peliculas como los profesionales. Know ware, PC-cuadernos, 2008.
- Dark Vador vs Monsieur Spock (co-written with Jeanne-A Debats). Foreword by Alan Dean Foster. Éditions Dunod, 2016.
- Méliès à la plage, la magie du cinéma dans un transat. Editions Dunod, 2026.

=== Essay ===
- Jorge Luis Borges, une autre littérature, by Jean-François Gérault. Collaboration to the filmography. Encrage/Les Belles Lettres, 2003.
- La figure de Watson dans les adaptations audiovisuelles in Sherlock Holmes, un nouveau limier pour le XXIe siècle, collective work. PUR Rennes / Colloque de Cerisy, 2016.
- Adapter Dune, analyse d'un scénariste dans Dune, le Mook, collectif. Editions L'Atalante & Leha, 2020.
- Penny Dreadful, Who am I? dans Saison, la revue des séries – 1, n° 1. Classiques Garnier, 2021.

=== Translations ===
- Techniques d'animation, translation of Richard Williams' book The Animator's Survival Kit. Eyrolles 2003.
- Créez vos propres animations en Stop Motion, translation of Melvyn Ternan's book. Editions Dunod, 2014.
- Composer ses images pour le cinéma : Structure visuelle de l'image animée, translation of Bruce Block's book. Editions Eyrolles, 2014.
- Métier : Réalisateur - Quand les maîtres du cinéma se racontent, translation of Mike Goodridge's book. Editions Dunod, 2014.
- Story - Ecrire des dialogues pour la scène et l'écran, translation of Robert McKee's book. Editions Armand Colin, 2017.
- Story - Ecrire un scénario pour le cinéma et la télévision, technical correction of the previous translation of Robert McKee's book. Editions Armand Colin, 2017.
- Story - Concevoir des personnages pour la scène et l'écran, translation of Robert McKee's book. Editions Armand Colin, 2023.
- Story - L'art de l'action pour l'écran et la scène, translation of Robert McKee's book. Editions Armand Colin, 2024.

=== Illustrations ===
- Cover of the anthologie 42, compiled by Jeanne-A Debats, Éditions Parchemins & Traverses, 2015.
- Cover and inside illustration of Dark Vador vs Monsieur Spock (also co-written with Jeanne-A Debats). Dunod, 2016.
- Cover of the anthologie Frontières, compiled by Simon Bréan. Éditions Parchemins & Traverses, 2017.

=== Misc. ===
- Mac OS X Lion. Editions Oracom, 2012.
- Mac Office, collective work. Editions Oracom, 2012.
- La photo de portrait, collective work. Editions Oracom, 2012.
- Débuter et progresser en photographie, collective work. Editions Oracom, 2013.
- Le guide des usages Mac, collectif. Éditions Oracom, 2014.
- The Great Memory Aid of Tarot, 2023, ISBN 978-2958036591.
- Le grand aide-mémoire des tirages du tarot, 2025, ISBN 978-2958036584.

=== newspapers : regular contributions ===
- iLive
- Création Numérique
- Pixel
- Le technicien du film
- CreaNum
- Movie Creation

== Filmography ==
- Concerto pour une image, writer/director short film S8 mm., 1977
- Le justicier, writer/director short film 16 mm., 1984
- Monsieur TiVi script writer (animated TV series), 1984–85
- Documentary about CGI director (made for the Futuroscope), 1997
- Oniric séquence for "L'annonce faite à Marius", integrated in the feature film directed by Armelle Sbraire, 1997
- Terra Incognita, writer/director short film 35 mm interpreted by Michael Lonsdale, 1995
- Fukushima 'The Mermaid', director, short film, 2005
- Fukushima 'The Fox', director, short film, 2006
- Fukushima 'Kohatayama', director, short film, 2006

=== DVD ===
Contribution to the bonus (interviews or booklets writing)

- Grave of the Fireflies (Isao Takahata). 2004, Wild Side Vidéo
- Jan Svankmajer Vol.1 (Jan Svankmajer). 2005, Chalet Films
- Astérix, the Gaumont trilogy (René Goscinny). 2005, Gaumont Vidéo
- Jan Svankmajer Vol.3 (Jan Svankmajer). 2007, Chalet Films
- Nuvole e mani. Il cinema animato di Simone Massi. 2014, Minimum Fax.
- Éclectisme animé (Gaël Brisou). Folimage, 2024.

== Prizes ==
- Public prize at Imola festival for Terra Incognita
- Best script for L'ultime défi de Sherlock Holmes at Festi'BD 2011.
- Prix Lucioles BD 2011 for L'ultime défi de Sherlock Holmes.
- Award for Special Contribution to Animation Research, at the World Festival of Animated Film - Animafest Zagreb in 2012.
