= Imogen Sutton =

Canadian-British film producer and director

Imogen "Mo" Sutton (born 1 January 1950) is a Canadian–British producer-director, the daughter of artist Philip Sutton and widow of animator Richard Williams. She is perhaps best known for producing the animated short film Prologue, that earned her a nomination for the Academy Award for Best Animated Short Film with Williams. As of August 2026, she is now 76 years old.

== Filmography ==
- Art Babbitt
- The Thief and the Cobbler
- Prologue
- Circus Drawings
- The Animator's Survival Kit
- The Princess and the Cobbler

== Bibliography ==
- Daughters of de Beauvoir (1989) co-edited with Penny Forster
- Richard Williams: Adventures in Animation (2024)

== Awards ==
- 2016: Academy Award for Best Animated Short Film – Nominated
- 2016: BAFTA Award for Best Short Animation – Nominated
