= The Little Island (film) =

1959 film

- Directed by: Richard Williams
- Written by: Richard Williams
- Produced by: Richard Williams
- Music by: Tristram Cary
- Distributed by: J. Arthur Rank Film Distributors
- Release date: 31 July 1958
- Running time: 33 minutes
- Country: United Kingdom
- Language: English

The Little Island is a 1958 British animated short film directed, produced, and animated by Richard Williams.

== Production ==
Self-financed, Richard's first film was a half-hour philosophical argument without words.

== Accolades ==
It won the 1959 BAFTA award for Best Animated Film.

== Plot ==
The film features three men who each only believe in one thing: one in Good, one in Truth, and one in Beauty. They cast themselves onto a small island, where they remove their clothes and sit next to each other. Many days pass, and they begin to express themselves. It starts in small ways, simply making noise. The three start to annoy each other, and they stop. As more time passes, however, they begin to express their ideas.

Truth is first. He sits in yoga positions and begins to project shapes, such as suns, lotus flowers and four almond-shaped eyes. These eyes move around in strange patterns before becoming part of a four-eyed demon who dances for a moment, then explodes. A pinball bounces between many pairs of eyes, building up speed before landing on Truth's head, which causes him to visualize an expanding shape, and reveals itself to be a huge, beautiful flower. The shape collapses, which stuns Truth out of his trance, much to his embarrassment.

Beauty performs ballet and transforms into a Nubian figure. He morphs into calligraphy-like shapes before changing to his normal shape, but in a white robe. He begins to play a flute, flowers growing around him as he plays faster and faster before he becomes one himself. A Greek statue of a woman appears. The William Tell Overture begins to play, and a tall man and a short man carrying a frame walk up to the statue and "capture" it inside it, removing its head and base. They walk on as the Overture plays, but the picture soon splits in half, since the men walk at different speeds. Confused, they put it back together after several odd attempts, and soon climb a long staircase with it. They climb high up into the sky into an art gallery, where it's placed with hundreds of identical pictures, except for one.

This picture shows a scene where a small head, in profile, sees an object and begins to talk happily about it, his speaking expressed by a cello playing. Another man comes next to him, facing him, and sees the object as well. He discusses it with him, but the two heads soon begin arguing harshly. A pillar grows out from under the left head, making him sit above the other. He responds by growing another column underneath him, and the two heads quickly try to one-up each other, their columns growing and their arguing becoming worse. Soon, they can't go any higher, and push themselves into each other, forming a babbling head in front-view. The scene zooms out to show dozens of these heads on high columns, chattering away. Beauty's vision ends here, and he bows to the other two.

Good expresses himself next, kissing the other two and dancing. He transforms into a figure with a robe, begins to make noises like a pipe organ, then transforms into a church-like structure with an onion dome. Small black figures go through a door at his base, and turn white as they go through it. He transforms into a warrior with a huge sword and shield, blood running down his sword, before changing back to his old shape. A beautiful woman approaches and tries to seduce him, but he pushes her away. Another figure offers him wine, but he flattens him with a hammer, then transforms into a futuristic warrior with a ray gun. A large heart comes out of the ray gun and shatters, breaking his meditation. He looks at them, embarrassed.

More time passes, and Beauty starts to express himself again, changing into the Nubian figure with a harp, playing a repetitive tune and swishing his long hair. This annoys Good, who responds by gathering smaller figures to join hands around him and playing the same tune back at him. Truth, hovering overhead, is annoyed at both of them. After trying to outdo each other, they all abruptly change back. Soon, though, Beauty is at it again, and Good responds by forming into a warrior with a blunderbuss and a small army gathers around him. Initially concerned, Beauty responds by changing into the Nubian figure with a fencing foil. Good attempts to shoot him, but Beauty dodges his shots and skewers his army (after a long dance) and starts playing them like his harp, which infuriates Good.

Truth hovers above, angry at the both of them, and after a sporadic fit, a snake coils around him, possibly representing the caduceus. After this, they all change back, but Good and Beauty are plotting against each other. Good raises his fist, which grows and grows until it hovers over him and flattens him, possibly representing punishment for thinking evil thoughts. Good grows into a huge monster, ten times the size of the other two, but each time he does, the fist bears down on him again. In response, Beauty turns back into the figure, this time with a bow and arrow, and shoots the fist, to Good's alarm. A drop of blood falls on Good, which sends him into a rage as Beauty cockily plays his tune on his bow. He changes into the monster, grabs Beauty, throws him against the ground and kicks him. He pulls off his hair and throws it back at him, which causes Beauty to lose his temper, and he transforms into a similar monster to fight Good.

Good and Beauty approach each other with daggers and soon run into each other. They get tangled up, and soon start to resemble a bull. Up above, tangled in the Caduceus, Truth is angry at them. He puts on a lab coat, and the Caduceus transforms into a chemistry coil. Good and Beauty soon appear to transform into a machine, tank treads, nuts and rivets appearing across their bodies, much to Truth's dismay. He walks over to a chalkboard and begins to write formulas on it. As he does, it grows and grows, and eventually takes on the shape of a giant nuclear bomb, 100 times his size, pointed down at them. He does not notice it initially until it begins to tick. The ticking builds and builds as the three look on, terrified. It soon explodes, and the three men change back. Horrified by this vision, they change back into their clothes and immediately leave the island.
