= Errol Le Cain =

British animator and illustrator (1941-1989)

- Born: Errol John Le Cain; 5 March 1941; Singapore, Straits Settlements
- Died: 3 January 1989 (aged 47); Bristol, England, UK
- Known for: Illustration, animation, children's books
- Awards: Kate Greenaway Medal; 1984

Errol John Le Cain (5 March 1941 – 3 January 1989) was a British-Singaporean animator and children's book illustrator. In 1984 he won the prestigious Kate Greenaway Medal for "distinguished illustration in a book for children" for Hiawatha's Childhood (Faber and Faber).

== Biography ==
Descended from a French great-grandfather (the European side of the Le Cain family originate from the British Channel Islands territory of Jersey), Le Cain was born 5 March 1941 to John, a police officer of the Singapore Police Force, and Minnie Le Cain (née Kronenburg) in Singapore but evacuated to Agra, India with his mother and other relations the following year to escape the Japanese invasion. His father was captured and interned in Changi Prison. Returning to Singapore after the war, he attended St. Patrick's Catholic School. With no formal art education, his talent was nevertheless evident from an early age; Le Cain was fascinated by cinema and made his first animated film, The Enchanted Mouse, with a friend's 8-mm camera at age 11. His next work, The Little Goatherd (1957), was created with a 16-mm camera in two months at age 15. This came to the attention of agents for British film distributor Pearl & Dean, who offered to pay his passage to London that year to pursue a career in animation for film and television.

In 1965, he joined the animation studio of Richard Williams, and in 1968 his first children's book was published. The following year he became a freelance illustrator and set designer for television. He married Dean Alison Thomson in 1976; after some time in Herne Bay the couple eventually settled in a suburb of Bristol with their two children. Errol Le Cain died after a long illness on 3 January 1989, aged 47. He was a committed Buddhist dating from his time in India.

== Animation and TV work ==
In the late 1950s, Le Cain joined an ensemble of amateur animators known as the Grasshopper Group, of which members included Oscar-winning animator Bob Godfrey, Canadian animator Gerald Potterton and British film historian Kevin Brownlow. While in the group, he directed and animated Victoria's Rocking Horse (1962), The Knight and the Fool (1963) and The Cage (1965), the first of which was the most celebrated of Amateur Cine World's Ten Best of 1962 and described by then secretary of the BFI, Stanley Reed, as "extremely elegant".

In early 1965, Le Cain departed the Grasshopper Group and joined Richard Williams Animation in Soho, London under an exclusive contract. He was put to work on a wide range of projects including film titles for The Liquidator (1965), A Funny Thing Happened on the Way to the Forum (1966), Casino Royale (1967), and The Charge of the Light Brigade (1968). His most notable work with Richard Williams was for the short film Sailor and the Devil (1967) and the unfinished (1964 to 1992) animated film The Thief and the Cobbler.

Le Cain turned freelance in 1969, working on sets for BBC television productions, continuing with animation projects, and beginning his career as a children's book illustrator.

His animation work for the BBC began with a production of Hans Christian Andersen's The Snow Queen, first broadcast on BBC2 on Christmas Day 1976, using live actors over backdrops designed by Le Cain. A picture-book version of the story with his illustrations was published by Viking Kestrel in 1979. This production was followed by The Light Princess (broadcast 24 December 1978 BBC2), The Mystery of the Disappearing Schoolgirls (28 December 1980) and Leon Garfield's The Ghost Downstairs (broadcast 26 December 1982 on BBC2).

In 1985 Le Cain made a special guest appearance on ITV's The Book Tower.

== Children's book illustration ==
According to Phyllis Hunt, Le Cain's long-term editor at Faber, the major part of his time was spent on his animation work and he regarded his children's books "as holidays".

Le Cain's first children's illustrations were published by Faber and Faber in a story he'd originally storyboarded for film, King Arthur's Sword (1968), which began a long association with Faber that continued to his death. His first book "made me aware of the scope and possibilities of children's book illustration, and now I am convinced this is the medium for me". Le Cain wrote 3 and illustrated 48 children's books during his lifetime, recognised for their richly decorative watercolours and masterful command of design and colour. His self-authored works were King Arthur's Sword (1968), The Cabbage Princess (1969) and The White Cat (1973). He was commended for the 1969, 1975, and 1978 Greenaway awards before winning the 1984 Medal and was commended again for 1987. The four commended books were The Cabbage Princess; Thorn Rose, or the Sleeping Beauty based on the version related by the Brothers Grimm; The Twelve Dancing Princesses, retold from the Brothers Grimm; and The Enchanter's Daughter by Antonia Barber. (Note: Today the Greenaway Medal shortlist typically comprises eight books. According to CCSU, some runners-up through 2002 were Commended (from 1959) or Highly Commended (from 1974). There were 99 commendations of both kinds in 44 years, including two for 1969, two 1975, three 1978 (one highly commended), and three 1987.)

== Selected children's books ==
=== As writer and illustrator ===
- King Arthur's Sword (Faber, 1968)
- The Cabbage Princess (Faber, 1969) —commended for the Kate Greenaway Medal
- The White Cat (Faber, 1973) retold by Le Cain from the story by Madame D'Aulnoy.

=== As illustrator only ===
- The Pleasantries of the Incredible Mulla Nasrudin, written by Idries Shah, illustrated by Richard Williams and Le Cain;(Jonathan Cape, 1968)
- Sir Orfeo, written by Anthea Davies (Faber, 1970)
- The Faber Book of Children's Songs, selected by Donald Mitchell and Roderick Biss (Faber, 1970)
- Collected Rhymes and Verses, written by Walter De La Mare (Faber, 1970)
- The Child in the Bamboo Grove, written by Rosemary Harris (Faber, 1971)
- Cinderella, adapted from Charles Perrault (Faber, 1972)
- The Beachcombers, written by Helen Cresswell (Faber, 1972)
- The Rime Of The Ancient Mariner, by Samuel Taylor Coleridge (Limited Edition, The Arcadia Press, 1972)
- The King's White Elephant, written by Rosemary Harris (Faber, 1973)
- King Orville and the Bullfrogs, written by Kathleen Abell (Faber, 1974)
- Dragon Kite, written by Thomas P. Lewis (Holt, 1974)
- The Lotus and the Grail: Legends from East to West, written by Rosemary Harris (Faber, 1974)
- Wigger, written by William Goldman (Harcourt, Brace, Jovanovich, 1974)
- Thorn Rose, or the Sleeping Beauty, adapted from The Brothers Grimm (Faber, 1975) —commended for the Greenaway
- The Flying Ship, written by Rosemary Harris (Faber, 1975)
- The Green Glass Bottle: Folk Tales from the Isle of Man, adapted by Zena Carus (Blackie, 1975)
- The Rat, the Ox, and the Zodiac: A Chinese Legend, written by Dorothy Van Woerkom (Crown, 1976)
- The Little Dog of Fo, by Rosemary Harris (Faber, 1976)
- Puffin's Pleasure, written by Kaye Webb and Treld Bicknell (Le Cain contributor), (Puffin, 1976)
- The Sly Cormorant and the Fishes, written by Brian Patten (Kestrel, 1977)
- Cupid and Psyche, adapted by Brian Patten (Faber, 1977)
- The Twelve Dancing Princesses, adapted from The Brothers Grimm (Faber, 1978) —commended for the Greenaway
- Beauty and The Beast, adapted from Charles Perrault (Faber, 1979)
- The Snow Queen, adapted from Hans Christian Andersen by Naomi Lewis (Viking Kestrel, 1979)
- The Three Magic Gifts, written by James Riordan (Kaye & Ward, 1980)
- Mrs Fox's Wedding, retold by Sara and Stephen Corrin (Faber, 1980)
- Aladdin and the Wonderful Lamp, retold by Andrew Lang (Faber, 1981)
- Molly Whuppie, written by Walter De La Mare (Faber, 1983)
- Hiawatha's Childhood, selected from Henry Wadsworth Longfellow (Faber, 1984) —winner of the Greenaway Medal
- Growltiger's Last Stand and Other Poems, written by T.S. Eliot (Faber, 1986)
- Crisis at Crabtree, written by Sally Miles (Lutterworth Press, 1986)
- A School Bewitched, written by Naomi Lewis and E. Nesbit (Macmillan, 1986)
- The Enchanter's Daughter, written by Antonia Barber (Cape, 1986) —commended for the Greenaway
- The Christmas Stockings, written by Mathew Price (Mathew Price / Barrons Juveniles, 1987)
- Christmas 1993 or Santa's Last Ride, written by Leslie Bricusse (Faber, 1987)
- Alfi and the Dark, written by Sally Miles (Hodder & Stoughton, 1988)
- The Pied Piper of Hamelin, retold by Sara and Stephen Corrin (Faber, 1988)
- Mr Mistoffelees with Mungojerrie and Rumpelteazer, written by T.S. Eliot (Faber, 1990)
- Have You Seen My Sister?, written by Mathew Price (Kingfisher / Harcourt, 1990)
