= Sailor and the Devil =

- Directed by: Richard Williams; Errol Le Cain
- Produced by: Richard Williams
- Starring: Alex Bradford
- Music by: Peter Shade
- Animation by: Errol Le Cain; Sergio Simonetti
- Production company: Richard Williams Productions
- Distributed by: British Lion
- Release date: 1967
- Running time: 7:30
- Country: United Kingdom
- Language: English

Sailor and the Devil is a 1967 animated short film produced by Richard Williams Animation. The film was directed by animators Richard Williams and Errol Le Cain, and features gospel singer Alex Bradford as the titular character.

== Plot ==
A seafarer recounts to a group of children a tale from his younger days. In this anecdote, he encounters a violent storm while sailing and fishing out at sea. The tempest brings howling winds, torrential rain, and bright lightning, generating waves "as high as mountains" that threaten to sink his vessel and drown him. His boat, constructed from the strongest wood, withstands the furious storm, allowing him to survive. Once the storm subsides, the sailor discovers that he has been driven far off course into an unfamiliar and ominous sea. The waters there appear a bright blood-red color, with all visible fish lying dead. Bubbles of gas rise from the depths, rendering the air difficult to breathe. Through a foul-smelling fog, he sights a desolate island that seems the product of a malevolent force. The island is a place of suffering, marked by boiling waters near the shore and the continuous sounds of moaning and screaming from its miserable and pained inhabitants. As the sailor attempts to depart hastily, a commanding voice addresses him, declaring that although he has escaped for the present, he will return to the island after his death. Upon looking back, he beholds Satan standing on the shore, tormenting the island's residents by piercing them with his pitchfork and pulling out their hair; the sailor advises listeners to lead virtuous lives, lest they suffer a similar fate upon the afterlife. Rejecting Satan's threat, the sailor is determined to not have any reason to come back. After a year and a day of sailing home across known and unknown seas, a guiding voice reminds him that the Devil cannot claim those who do no wrong. He concludes the story by urging others to treat people as they themselves wish to be treated.

== Production and release ==
Produced at Richard Williams Animation in Soho, London, Sailor and the Devil was one of Williams' early short films. The soundtrack for the film had initially been recorded in 1963 and it wasn't until Errol Le Cain began working for the studio at the start of 1965 did Williams suggested he direct the short film under his supervision the following year. According to Williams: "He [Le Cain] is doing everything so he's getting ten years' experience in one, and we get a film."

The animation was completed by Le Cain and Sergio Simonetti by drawing chinagraph directly onto the acetate cels, a technique which would be used for the animated sequences of The Charge of the Light Brigade (1968) and A Christmas Carol (1971). As well as this, Sailor also showcased detailed sequences and experimental techniques that would later influence the work on The Thief and the Cobbler.

Williams himself financed much of the production, reflecting his commitment to artistic integrity and innovation. The short film served as a stepping stone for Le Cain and Williams, who would go on to gain fame for his Oscar-winning work on Who Framed Roger Rabbit (1988).

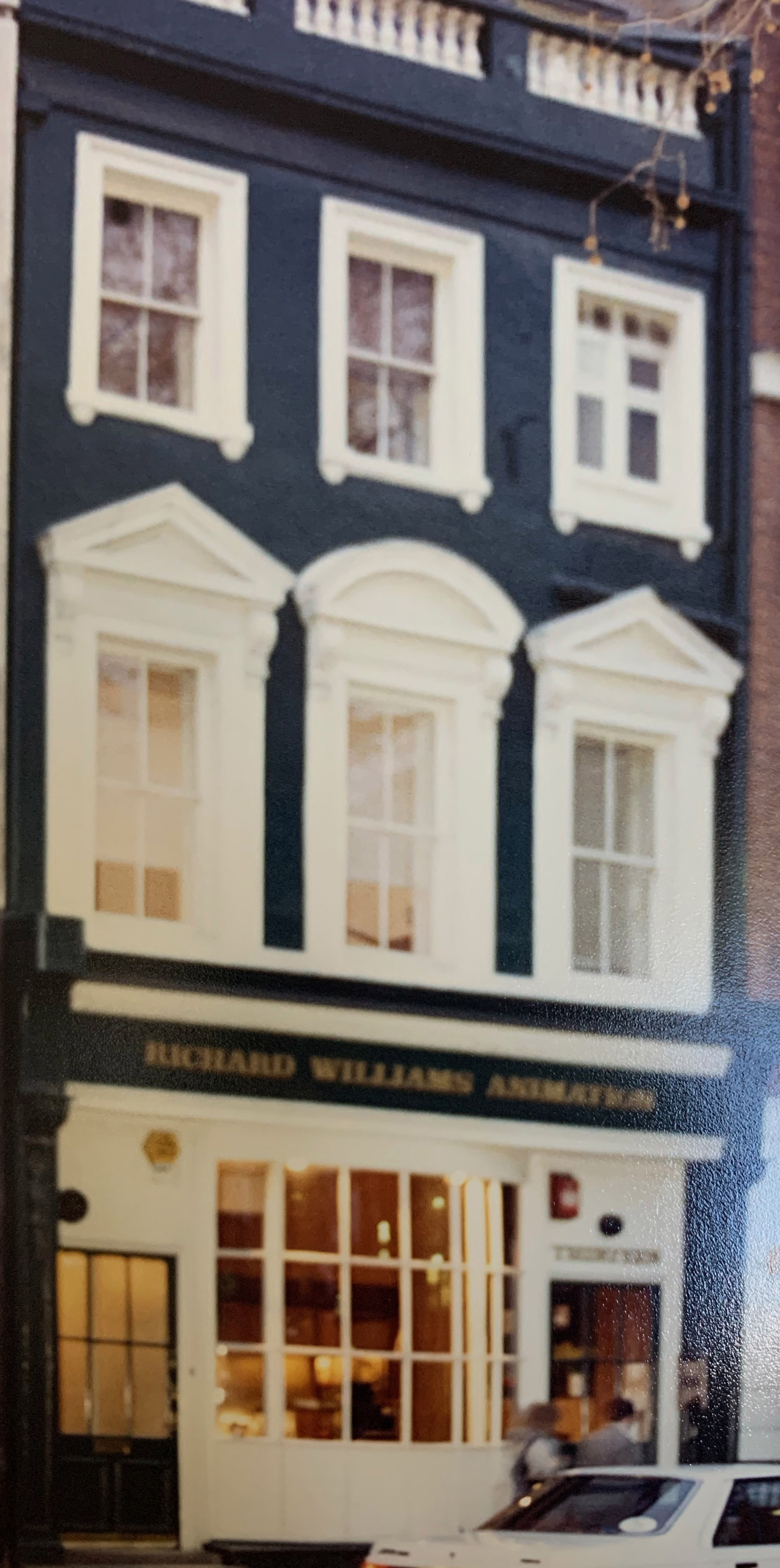
Richard Williams Animation, Soho Square

The film was released in 1967 and screened at the Locarno Film Festival, Annecy Festival and later as part of a Richard Williams retrospective at the Gothenburg Film Festival. It was reported in International Film Guide 1967 as having begun as a children's film and ended as an adult's film.

== Loss and rediscovery ==
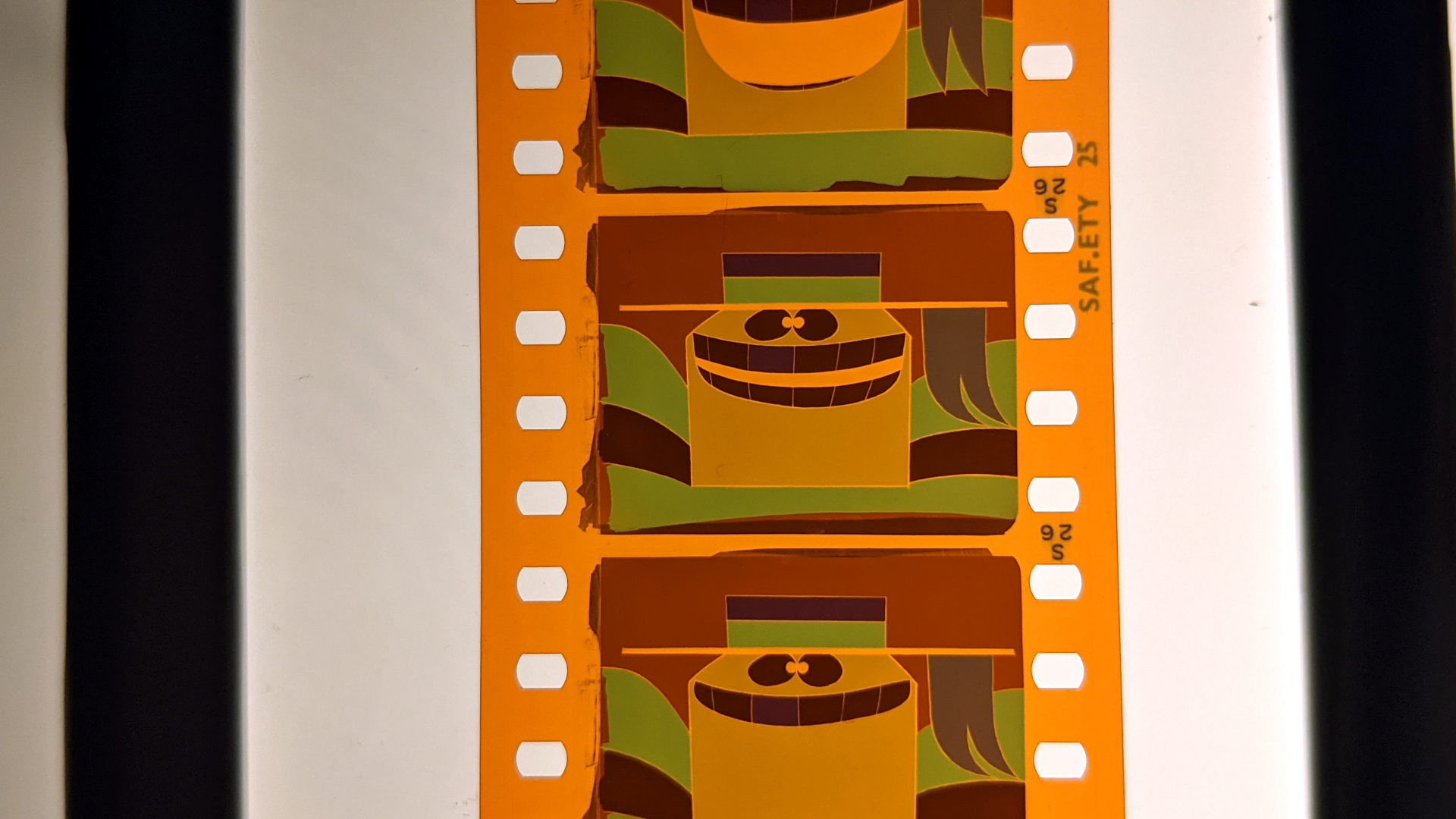
Sailor's original eastmancolor camera negative.

Shortly after its release in 1967, a studio fire destroyed the film's original production artwork, as well as that of many others. Sailor would later reappear on television in 1983 as a part of HBO Short Take, albeit shortened considerably, however, it was considered a lost film after Richard Williams Animation shut down in the early 1990s. In March 2021, animator Daniel Aguirre Hansell embarked on a search for an original copy of the film, contacting various film archives around the world. Eventually in the following September, Technicolor confirmed its possession of the original negative material, and with the help of experimental filmmaker Maximilian LeCain (son of Errol), and BFI animation curator Jez Stewart, Sailor was put in the care of the British Film Institute where it currently awaits restoration. In early 2026 however, an acetate recording of the original magnetic audio film, which was used by Le Cain as reference material for lip-syncing, was discovered to have survived, and was digitised.

== Legacy ==
Sailor and the Devil is considered a precursor to Williams' later works, encapsulating the themes of trickery, morality, and artistry that would characterize much of his career. Le Cain, who would later be celebrated for his children's books, remained a frequent freelance contributor to the studio and had a heavy influence on the art direction of The Thief and the Cobbler, which would go on to influence the animation world as well as the films of Cartoon Saloon.

When Sailor reappeared on YouTube in 2013 through Garrett Gilchrist and TheThiefArchive, Amid Amidi of Cartoon Brew wrote in an article:

Le Cain invents an idiosyncratic style of movement that combines jittery bursts of motion with visually pleasing dance cycles. When the storm arrives in the film or the skeleton wave threatens to overwhelm the sailor, we encounter a world of pure graphic art. Le Cain uses the full range of color, movement, design, and cinematic devices to create an exciting universe that could exist nowhere but in an animated film.
