= Rosemary Harris (writer) =

British author (1923–2019)

- Born: Rosemary Jeanne Harris; 20 February 1923; London, England, UK
- Died: 14 October 2019 (aged 96)
- Occupation: Writer
- Writing career
- Language: English
- Period: 1956–1996
- Genres: Children's fiction, romance novels, suspense novels
- Notable work: The Moon in the Cloud (Egypt trilogy)
- Notable awards: Carnegie Medal; 1968

Rosemary Jeanne Harris (20 February 1923 – 14 October 2019) was a British author of children's fiction. She won the 1968 Carnegie Medal for British children's books.

Harris was born in London in February 1923, the daughter of Sir Arthur "Bomber" Harris and his wife, Barbara Daisy Kyrle Money. She attended school in Weymouth, and then studied at the Central Saint Martins College of Art and Design, the Chelsea School of Art and the Courtauld Institute. She served in the British Red Cross Nursing Auxiliary Westminster Division during World War II and subsequently worked as a picture restorer and as a reader for Metro-Goldwyn-Mayer. From 1970 to 1973 she reviewed children's books for The Times.

For The Moon in the Cloud, published by Faber in 1968, Harris won the annual Carnegie Medal from the Library Association, recognising the year's best children's book by a British subject. The Moon was the first volume of a trilogy set in ancient Egypt, followed by The Shadow on the Sun (1970) and The Bright and Morning Star (1972). The book was also the basis for a 1978 episode of the BBC series Jackanory.

Harris died on 14 October 2019, at the age of 96.

== Selected works ==
Egypt series

- The Moon in the Cloud (Faber, 1968)
- The Shadow on the Sun (Faber, 1970)
- The Bright and Morning Star (Faber, 1972)

Orion series

- A Quest for Orion (1978)
- Tower of the Stars (1980)

Other

- The Summer-house (Hamish Hamilton, 1956)
- Venus with Sparrows (Faber, 1961)
- All My Enemies (Faber, 1967)
- The Nice Girl's Story (Faber, 1968); U.S. title, Nor Evil Dreams
- A Wicked Pack of Cards (Faber, 1969)
- The Seal-Singing (Faber, 1971)
- The Child in the Bamboo Grove (Faber, 1971), illustrated by Errol Le Cain
- King's White Elephant (1973)
- The Double-Snare (Faber, 1974)
- Sea Magic and Other Stories of Enchantment (1974)
- Flying Ship (1975)
- Little Dog of Fo, illus. Errol Le Cain (1976)
- I Want to Be a Fish (1977)
- Beauty and the Beast, illus. Errol Le Cain (1979)
- Zed (1982)
- Janni's Stork (1984)
- The Lotus and the Grail: Legends from East to West (1985)
- Summers of the Wild Rose (1987)
- Love and the Merrygoround (1988)
- Ticket to Freedom (1992)
- Haunting of Joey Mbasa (1996)
