= The Moon in the Cloud =

1968 children's novel by Rosemary Harris

- Cover of first edition
- Author: Rosemary Harris
- Language: English
- Series: Egyptian trilogy
- Genre: Children's fantasy novel, historical fantasy
- Publisher: Faber and Faber
- Publication date: 1968
- Publication place: United Kingdom
- Media type: Print (hardcover)
- Pages: 176 pp (first edition)
- ISBN: 0571086705
- OCLC: 41022
- Dewey Decimal: 823/.9/14
- LC Class: PZ7.H2437 Mo
- Followed by: The Shadow on the Sun

The Moon in the Cloud is a light-hearted children's historical fantasy novel by Rosemary Harris, published by Faber in 1968. It is set in ancient Canaan and Egypt at the time of the Biblical Flood and rooted in the story of Noah's Ark. It is the first book of a series sometimes called the Egyptian trilogy, followed by The Shadow on the Sun (1970) and The Bright and Morning Star (1972).

Harris won the annual Carnegie Medal from the Library Association, recognising the year's best children's book by a British subject.

Macmillan published the first US edition in 1969.

The Moon in the Cloud was adapted for television in 1978.

== Plot summary ==
When the Lord God decides to send a flood, he instructs Noah to build an Ark and save his family and the animals. Noah gives his reprobate son Ham the responsibility of collecting two cats from Kemi, the Black Land (Egypt), and two lions, but Ham passes the task to his neighbour Reuben by promising to persuade Noah to let Reuben and his wife on the Ark.

Reuben travels to Kemi with his camel Anak, his cat Cefalu and his dog Benoni. In the desert they are captured by the High Priest of Sekhmet, who is impressed by Cefalu's sacred heritage. He houses the cat in the Temple of Sekhmet in Kemi's capital Men-nofer, where Cefalu falls in love with the resident temple cat Meluseth. Reuben is presented as a slave to the music-loving King, who becomes his friend. However, he despairs of returning home until a 'supernatural' display arranged by the High Priest of Ptah backfires. Panic and rioting in the streets give Reuben a chance to escape and rescue his animals. Meluseth joins them.

On the way back, Cefalu persuades the lion Aryeh to come to the Ark. They meet Thamar, who has camped in the desert to escape the attentions of Ham and has meanwhile rescued a lost lion cub. They return home with the two cats and the two lions only to encounter treachery from Ham. However, a providential accident secures them a place of safety just as the rain begins to fall.

== Characters ==
- The Lord God

The Canaanites

- Reuben, a young animal-tamer, artist and musician, kind and brave
- Thamar, his beautiful and devoted wife
- Noah, a visionary patriarch
- Noah's patient wife
- Ham, Noah's wayward son, lazy, cruel, cowardly and deceitful
- Japheth and Shem, Noah's dutiful sons, sceptical but obedient
- Noah's daughters-in-law

The Egyptians

- The High Priest of Sekhmet, ruthless and avaricious
- Kenamut, the High Priest's shrewd interpreter
- Ani, the High Priest's chief guard, & his family
- The King, also known as Horus, the Son of Re, a good-hearted young man, beset by advisers
- Senusmet, the King's Vizier, domineering and astute
- Tahlevi, a kindly tomb robber
- The High Priest of Ptah, ambitious and unscrupulous

The animals

- Anak, Reuben's sarcastic dromedary, and his mate
- Cefalu, Reuben's wilful black cat
- Benoni, Reuben's amiable herd dog
- Mouse, an elephant, and her mate
- Meluseth, a beautiful white temple cat with delusions of grandeur
- Aryeh, a formidable lion
- A very young lion cub

== History and legend ==
In the author's note, Rosemary Harris says the book is set in the Egyptian Old Kingdom, during the VIth Dynasty. At that time Upper and Lower Egypt had long been united with Men-nofer as the capital. The Flood is not fixed in historical time, and its being placed here tends to confirm the suspicion of some of the characters that it will be a merely local affair. The author cites several scholarly sources on Egypt and says that she has tried to avoid slips in the historical background, but "if there are some, I shall make the cowardly excuse that most writers on ancient Egypt blandly disagree on detail, right down to the spelling of names".

== Literary significance and reception ==
A review in the Bulletin of the Center for Children's Books of March 1973 refers to the "sophisticated humor" of the novel, while another review of a later book by the author calls The Moon in the Cloud a "magical children's classic". John Rowe Townsend in a discussion of created worlds says the author "created an Ancient Egypt that (it seems safe to say) never was... Talking animals are the least of the improbabilities." (However, it should be explained that the 'speech' of the animals is intended only as a representation of animal communication, which Reuben understands – these are not talking animals in the Narnian sense.) Townsend clearly appreciates the humour of the book and its sequels, referring particularly to the "delicate irreverence" with which the story of Noah's Ark is presented.

== Awards ==
Beside winning the 1968 Carnegie Medal for British children's books, The Moon in the Cloud was named a Horn Book Fanfare Best Book by the editors of the Horn Book Magazine in 1971.

== Television adaptation ==
The novel was adapted for the children's television series Jackanory in 1978, with Ian McKellen as the reader.

== See also ==
Awards
Preceded by The Owl Service	Carnegie Medal recipient 1968	Succeeded by The Edge of the Cloud
