= Mark Baker (actor) =

American film actor

- Publicity Photo of Mark Baker
- Born: Mark Fredric Baker; October 2, 1946; Cumberland, Maryland
- Died: August 13, 2018 (aged 71); Cumberland, Maryland

Mark Fredric Baker (October 2, 1946 – August 13, 2018) was an American actor. He was best known for the title role in Harold Prince's revival of Candide, for which he received a Tony Award nomination, and his portrayal of Otto Kringelein in the international tour of Grand Hotel.

== Early life ==
Mark Fredric Baker was born in Cumberland, Maryland, on October 2, 1946, to parents Francis Tweedie and Aretta Sue Swayne. Baker attended Carnegie Mellon University and Wittenberg University. He trained for the stage at the Neighborhood Playhouse School of the Theatre in New York City.

== Career ==
Baker made his professional acting debut portraying Linus Van Pelt in You're a Good Man, Charlie Brown in a 1970 off-Broadway production. In November 1971, Baker appeared at the Mercer-O'Casey Theatre playing the Boy in Love Me, Love My Children. Baker made his Broadway theatre debut in November 1972 playing Cook in Via Galactica, a musical which, having lost nearly $1 million, is considered one of the worst flops in Broadway history. Baker appeared on Broadway again in 1974 in the title role of Candide, a performance which earned him a Theatre World Award and a nomination for the Tony Award for Best Featured Actor in a Musical.

From 1990 to 1991, Baker appeared as Otto Kringelein in the Broadway international tour of Grand Hotel at venues throughout the United States, Canada and Japan, and received a Helen Hayes Award for his performance at the Kennedy Center. Other venues at which Baker has performed include The Public Theater and what was then referred to as the Martin Beck Theatre. More recently he appeared on a studio recording of George Gershwin's Tip-Toes in 2001.

In 1976, Baker appeared in the romantic adventure film Swashbuckler. The following year, he supplied the voice acting for Raggedy Andy in the animated film Raggedy Ann & Andy: A Musical Adventure. Baker served as assistant director to Ken Russell in the 1977 film Valentino. Baker also appeared in the 1982 film Smithereens, credited as Roger Jett.

== Personal life and death ==
Baker married actress and designer Patricia Britton, though the marriage ended in divorce.

Baker died on August 13, 2018, in Cumberland. He devoted the last twenty years of his life to restoring and operating that city's Embassy Theatre.

== Filmography ==
=== Film ===
Year	Title	Role	Notes
1976	Swashbuckler	Lute Player	
1977	Raggedy Ann & Andy: A Musical Adventure	Raggedy Andy	Voice
1977	Valentino	Director	Uncredited
1982	Smithereens		
2015	Phantom Limbs	Grandpa	
2018	Stalemate	Jewish Pawns	
2018	Dinnertime	Bill	
2020	Larry Larissa Linda	Larry	Posthumous release

=== Television ===
Year	Title	Role	Notes
1977	A Doonesbury Special	Kirby	Voice
1977	Macy's Thanksgiving Day Parade	Himself	
1985	St. Elsewhere	Buddy Askew	Episode: "Lost and Found in Space"
1985	The Equalizer	Thug #1	Episode: "Bump and Run"
