= Prologue (2015 film) =

2015 animated short film by Richard Williams

- Film poster
- Directed by: Richard Williams
- Written by: Richard Williams
- Produced by: Imogen Sutton
- Release date: 17 October 2015; (Sitges Film Festival)
- Running time: 6 minutes
- Country: United Kingdom
- Language: English

Prologue is a 2015 British animated short film written and directed by Richard Williams and produced by Imogen Sutton. It was the final film directed by Williams before his death in August 2019.

== Summary ==
It was to be the first part of a planned feature film based on the play Lysistrata by Aristophanes, in which Greek women withhold sexual privilege from their husbands and lovers in order to end a war. The short film depicts the gruesome combat between ancient Greek soldiers, resulting in the death of every combatant and the reveal that the entire skirmish was witnessed by a little girl, who runs off to the comfort of an older woman.

== Development ==
Prologue is the first six minutes of Richard Williams' then-planned hand-drawn feature film Lysistrata, based on the ancient Greek comedy by Aristophanes, which Williams joked should be sub-titled "Will I Live to Finish It?". Williams described Prologue as "the only thing so far in my career that I've ever really been pleased with." In 2013, Williams told The Guardian, "All I need is some time and five or six assistants who can draw like hell." The film was intended to be "grim but funny and salacious and sexy". Like his version of The Thief and the Cobbler, Prologue would never be completed. But, as Williams put it: "it's the doing of it that matters. Do it for the love of it. That's all there is".

== Reception ==
The film was a critical success and gained many awards and nominations, including an Oscar nomination for Best Animated Short Film.

== Awards ==
- 2016: Academy Award for Best Animated Short Film – Nominated (lost to Bear Story)
- 2016: BAFTA Award for Best Short Animation – Nominated

== Follow up ==
Lysistrata, a six-minute short, was previewed at the 2026 Annecy International Animation Film Festival in June. It was later screened as a 8-minute film at the Laemmle Glendale in Los Angeles in September.
