= Philip Sutton (artist) =

English painter

Philip Sutton RA
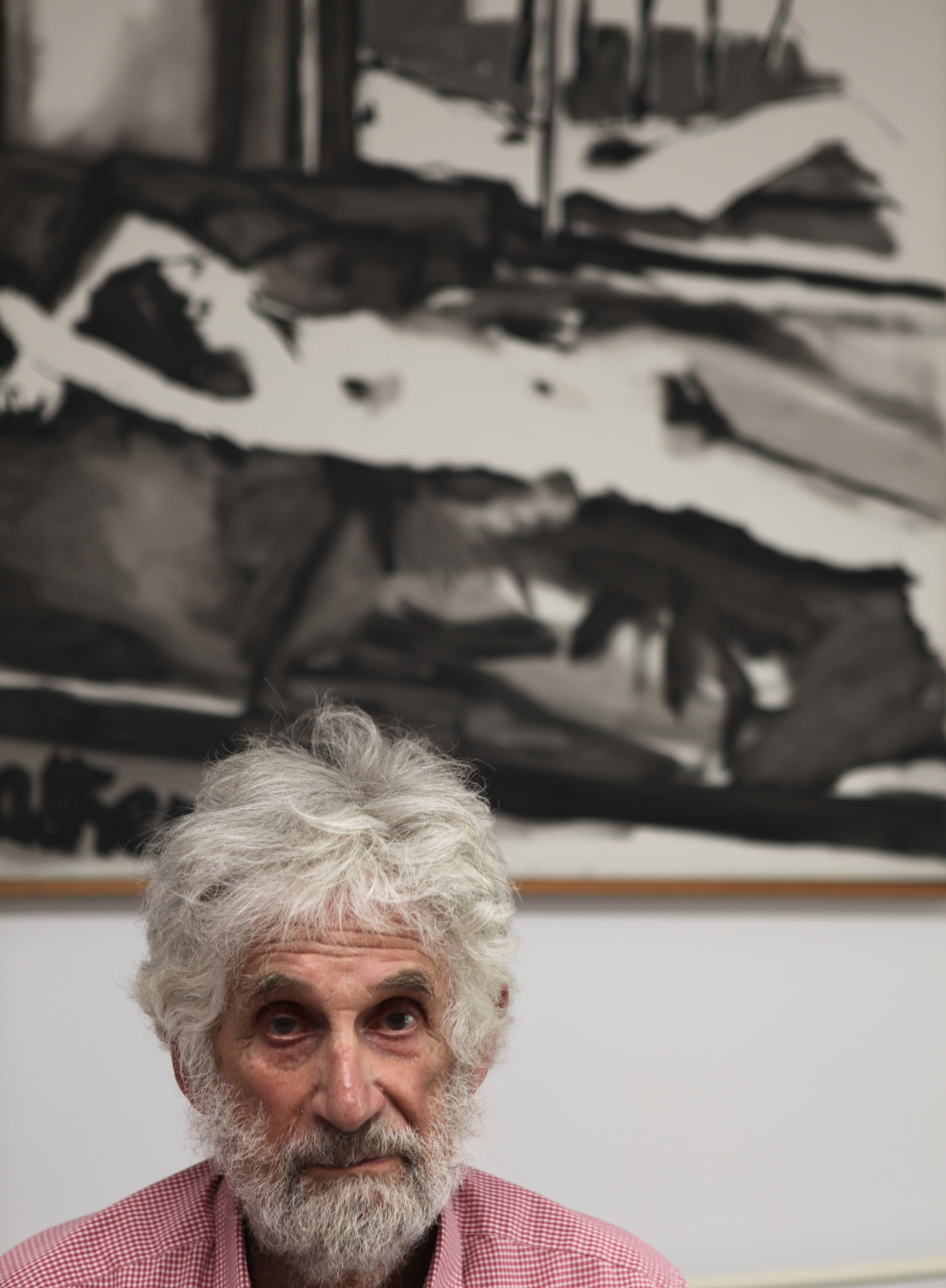
- Philip Sutton photographed below a portrait of his wife Heather Sutton
- Born: 20 October 1928 (age 97); Poole, Dorset, England
- Education: Slade School of Fine Art, London under William Coldstream
- Known for: painting, drawing
- Spouse: Heather Cooke
- Awards: Slade Summer Composition Prize, 1952
- Elected: The London Group, 1956; Royal Academy of Arts, 1988
- Website: www.philipsuttonra.com

Philip Sutton RA (born 20 October 1928) is a British artist active since the 1950s, best known for his large and highly coloured paintings of landscape, flowers and people.

== Early life ==
Philip Sutton was born in Poole, Dorset, in 1928 but grew up in Leyton, Essex (now East London). After leaving school at the age of 14, he worked in a drawing office before carrying out three years' National Service in the Royal Air Force (RAF), during which he was involved in the Berlin Airlift.

== Life and career ==
After leaving the RAF, Sutton used the ex-serviceman's grant scheme to gain a place at the Slade School of Fine Art in 1949, and in 1952 won the Slade Summer Composition Prize. At the school's degree show in 1953, Slade professor William Coldstream introduced Sutton's work to art dealers Henry Roland and Gustave Delbanco. That same year he married Heather Cooke, then travelled on scholarships to Spain, France and Italy. During their time in Europe the couple had a son named Jacob ("Jake") and daughter, producer-director Imogen "Mo" Sutton.

On his return to London he began teaching at the Slade School, where he remained for the next nine years. Around this time he made his first sale via a commercial gallery to tenor Peter Pears. The painting sold was a portrait of fellow Slade student Tony Tice. After discussing Sutton's circumstances with Gustave Delbanco, Pears invited Sutton to lunch with Pears' associate, composer Benjamin Britten. The pair offered Sutton and his family the use of Joy Cottage in Snape, Suffolk where the family stayed for three years (between 1955 and 1958), though this did not prevent his being elected to the London Group in 1956. Two more children were born during the family's time in Suffolk—a period during which Sutton's style as a painter matured as he abandoned abstractism and adopted more subtle colours. Returning to London in 1958, Sutton held his first solo exhibition at the Roland, Browse and Delbanco Gallery, also the venue for many later exhibitions throughout the 1960s and 1970s. It was in these two decades that his work became fashionable.

In 1977 Sutton was elected as an Associate Royal Academician, his works were included in an exhibition at the Royal Academy, and he was the subject of a BBC Arena programme. In the late 1970s and 1980s, Sutton turned his hand to design, creating a poster and banner for the 1979 Royal Academy Summer Exhibition, a tapestry for Shell in 1984, and the logo for Investors in Industry the following year. This area extended to include ceramics – a wall of tiles for NMB Bank, Amsterdam – posters for London Transport, and postage stamps for Royal Mail. On 8 December 1988 he was elected as a Royal Academician.

A collection of his woodcuts from the 1950s to the 1970s was published in 1998, and a biography and collection of his work followed ten years later. He has continued to paint into his nineties despite having lost sight in one eye, and lives and works in West Bay, Dorset. In December 2020 he opened his own gallery in Bridport, Dorset. Sutton spoke to The Guardian about his experiences of lockdown in his care home and being able to draw again outside, his gallery reopened after lockdown and was one of the venues for Dorset Art Weeks.
