= Leica reel =

Storyboarding device

In film, specifically animation, a Leica reel (also known as story reel or animatic) is a type of storyboarding device used in the production of potential series or features. Unlike actual storyboards or pitches, Leica reels (when made) are used later in the development process, usually after voice actors have been hired and recorded, and thus are not used for selling or marketing the project. The term "Leica reel" is derived from the German camera maker Leica initially used to develop these filmed storyboards.

A Leica reel is made from animated stills or preliminary artwork or storyboard frames. These are then arranged with recorded material. The specific recorded material used can occasionally be the entire soundtrack of the film, where sound editing has already occurred, though in many cases it is only the vocal soundtrack (in various states of completion) along with a selection of sound effects.
