= The Courier Times =

Person County, North Carolina newspaper

The Courier-Times
- Type: Weekly newspaper
- Format: Broadsheet
- Editor: Kelly Snow
- Language: English
- Headquarters: 111 N. Main St, Roxboro, North Carolina United States
- Website: personcountylife.com

The Courier-Times is a once-a-week newspaper based in Roxboro, North Carolina, covering Person County. Publications are on Thursdays. The newspaper publishes several special sections, in January on Taxes, home improvement in May, local graduates in May, fall sports in August, holiday shopping on Thanksgiving Day, and Christmas greetings on Christmas Day.

In 2017, The Courier-Times was acquired by the owners of The Daily Record in Dunn, North Carolina.

In 2020, then publisher-editor Johnny Whitfield resigned after a racist editorial cartoon was printed.

Kelly Snow was hired as the publisher and editor in June 2020. Snow served as the C-T's sports editor from 2003 to 2006 and again from January 2012 to September 2020.
