= Richard Williams (animator) =

Canadian and British animator (1933–2019)

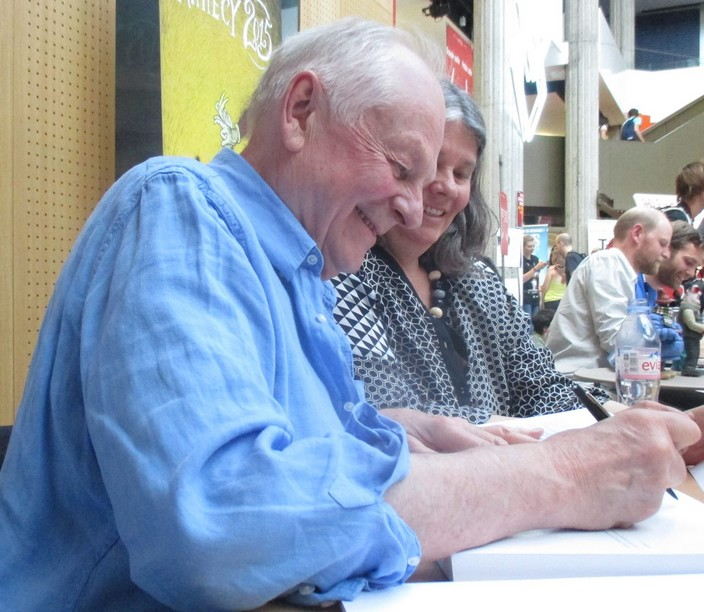
- Williams signing copies of The Animator's Survival Kit at the Annecy Film Festival in 2015
- Born: Richard Edmund Lane; March 19, 1933; Toronto, Ontario, Canada
- Died: August 16, 2019 (aged 86); Bristol, England
- Education: Northern Secondary School; Ontario College of Art; Royal College of Art (honorary doctorate)
- Occupations: Animator; voice actor; painter
- Years active: 1957–2019
- Notable work: Who Framed Roger Rabbit; The Thief and the Cobbler; A Christmas Carol
- Spouses: Stephanie Ashforth (m. 1953; div. 1956) Lois Catherine Steuart (m. 1966; div. 1976) Margaret French (m. 1976, divorced): Imogen Sutton
- Children: 6, including Alexander
- Awards: 3 Academy Awards (1971, 1988)

Richard Edmund Williams (né Lane; March 19, 1933 – August 16, 2019) was a Canadian and British animator, voice actor, and painter. A three-time Academy Award winner, he is best known as the animation director of Who Framed Roger Rabbit (1988)—for which he won two Academy Awards—and as the director of the unfinished feature film The Thief and the Cobbler (begun in 1964), which he had intended to be his "masterpiece" in the animation medium.

His work on the short film A Christmas Carol (1971) earned him his first Academy Award. He was also a film title sequence designer and animator. Other works in this field include the title sequences for What's New Pussycat? (1965) and A Funny Thing Happened on the Way to the Forum (1966), title and linking sequences in The Charge of the Light Brigade, and the intros of the eponymous cartoon feline for two of the later Pink Panther films.

In 2002, he published The Animator's Survival Kit, an authoritative manual of animation methods and techniques, which has since been turned into a 16-DVD box set as well as an iOS app. From 2008, he worked as an artist in residence at Aardman Animations in Bristol, and in 2015, he received both Oscar and BAFTA nominations in the best animated short category for his short film Prologue.

== Early life and education ==
Williams was born as Richard Edmund Lane in Toronto, Ontario, the only son of the commercial illustrator Kathleen "Kay" Bell (1909–1998) and Leslie Lane (1905–1993), a London-born painter and photographic retoucher. Lane left when Williams was a baby, and he was adopted by his stepfather, Kenneth D. C. Williams (1910–2003), an advertising executive who worked for Brigdens, a printing and design company in Toronto.

Williams grew up on Golfdale Road, a suburban street in Toronto, where he and his childhood friend Martin Hunter put on magic shows and comedy acts for the local neighbourhood: "We collected $16.25, wealth beyond the dreams of avarice". Williams' mother Kay was an accomplished illustrator whose work was inspired by Arthur Rackham and Edmund Dulac. Kay read her son the stories of the Arabian Nights, which would later inspire his magnum opus The Thief and the Cobbler. "Kay introduced us to The Thief of Baghdad with its flying carpets, magical horses and wicked viziers". At the age of five, Kay took her son to see Snow White and the Seven Dwarfs (1937), a film which made a "tremendous impression" on him. Later he would quote his mother as saying to him, "You saw ‘Snow White’ when you were 5, and you were never the same."

Williams was educated at the Northern Secondary School, Toronto, then known as the Northern Technical School. One of his classmates, Lars Thompson, recalled: "Under the name of Ivan Yurpee, [Dick] played a trumpet in a band of fellow zanies. In class, he would sketch our teachers with an animator's sure touch, and without detection".

At age 15, Williams travelled to Hollywood from Toronto on a five-day bus trip, where he took the Disney studio tour three days running, each day breaking away from the guide to seek out the studio animators and being ejected from the studio lot. He was finally invited to meet the animators, who showed him how the Disney animation process worked, after his mother contacted a friend who worked for Disney. "I always wanted, when I was a kid, to get to Disney. I was a clever little fellow so I took my drawings and I eventually got in. They did a story on me, and I was in there for two days, which you can imagine what it was like for a kid."

With help from his stepfather, Williams was already earning a living as a commercial artist at age 17, creating advertisements for companies such as Dr. Ballard's Pet Food. After graduating from high school, Williams enrolled in the advertising program at the Ontario College of Art. He did not receive a diploma, however, as he changed his course of study to join the fine arts program after his third year, where he would study drawing under the artist Eric Freifeld.

== Career ==
=== 1950s: Ibiza, London and The Little Island ===
Rembrandt van Rijn – inspiration

In 1953, Williams saw an exhibition of paintings by Rembrandt and was "moved to tears". For a time, he "lost all interest in animation". He left Canada and settled in Ibiza, where he lived for two years and became a painter, finding inspiration in the clowns and performers at a local circus. These sketches would eventually become the short film Circus Drawings, completed over 50 years later, in 2010. While in Ibiza, Williams played in a jazz band; his passion for the cornet would be an enduring one, and he would lead several bands over the years, inspired by the music of Bix Beiderbecke.

In Ibiza, Williams began to draw storyboards for an animated film about three misguided idealists. In 1955, Williams left Ibiza and moved to England, where he began working at fellow Canadian George Dunning's company, T.V. Cartoons Ltd., working mainly on television commercials. He also began developing his animated short film, The Little Island, during this period. Williams later explained that he was drawn back to the craft of animation because his "paintings were trying to move" and he "couldn't stand the idea of doing paintings for rich industrialists’ wives, and that whole art world was just repulsive as a way of life".

In the 1983 Thames Television documentary The Thief Who Never Gave Up, Williams credited animator Bob Godfrey with giving him his start in the business: "Bob Godfrey helped me...I worked in the basement and would do work in kind, and he would let me use the camera...[it was] a barter system".

In the mid-1950s, fellow Canadian Jacques Konig was studying at the University of London: "Dick did not play his cornet and lead his band just for the love of music, it was a significant and necessary contribution to his income. In my role as student president of the University of London's Chelsea College and Chelsea Arts School (1956–57), I booked his hard-driving traditional jazz band for many of our events, and we knew all his available cash was being used to finance his hand-drawn and highly imaginative short film".

In 1958, Williams completed The Little Island, the film that launched his career, telling the story of three men on a desert island; each representing a single virtue: truth, beauty, and good. The film won the 1958 BAFTA Award for Best Animated Film.

=== 1960s: Richard Williams Animation, film titles, and commercials ===
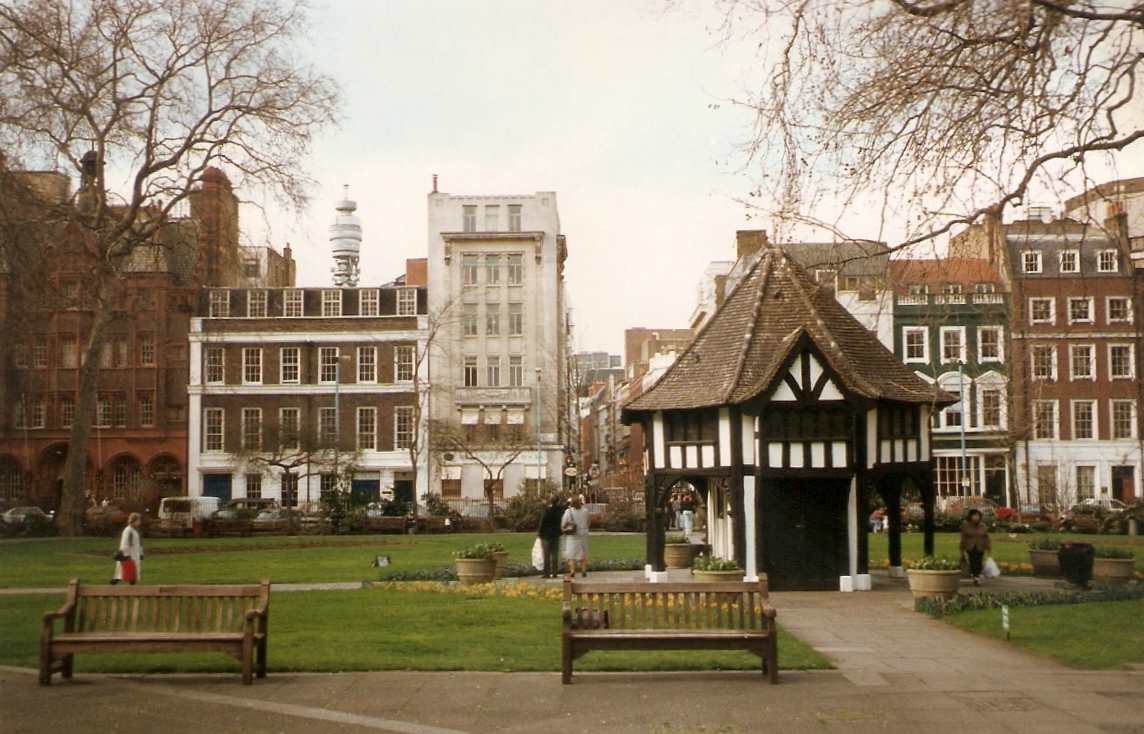
Soho Square in 1992. Richard Williams Animation is the green building to the right of the mock Tudor structure.

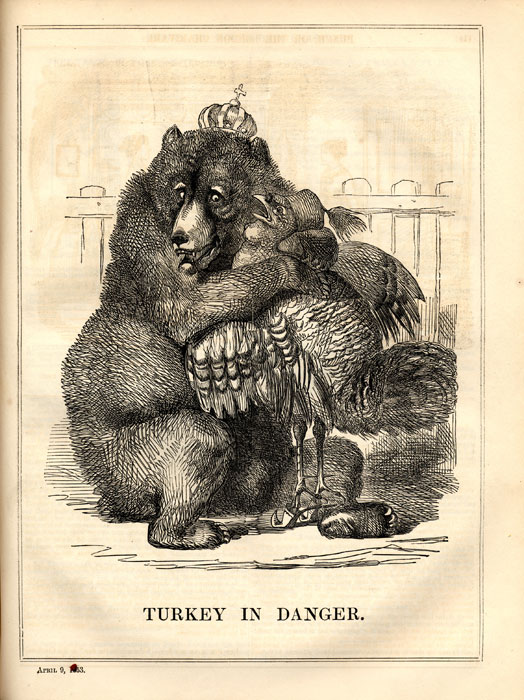
Williams' drawings for The Charge of the Light Brigade were inspired by contemporary cartoon illustrations

The critical and financial success of Williams's next short, Love Me, Love Me, Love Me (1962), which was narrated by Kenneth Williams, enabled him to establish his own company, Richard Williams Animation Ltd. He made the short film A Lecture on Man that same year. Richard Williams Animation Ltd. eventually completed over 2,500 TV commercials, and won numerous awards, at its home at 13 Soho Square in Soho, London.

In the mid-1960s, Williams began work on the personal project that he intended to be “the best animated feature ever”, based on the tales of Mulla Nasrudin, and initially titled Nasrudin. The project evolved over time and in 1973 he would settle on a new story and title, The Thief and the Cobbler.

In 1965, he made the short film The Dermis Probe, based on Idries Shah's retelling of the Blind men and the elephant, and also animated the title sequences to What's New Pussycat? (1965). In 1966, he animated the titles for A Funny Thing Happened on the Way to the Forum. Also in 1966 a television documentary, The Creative Person, was made about his life and work. In 1967, he completed the short film Sailor and the Devil, mainly animated by the illustrator Errol Le Cain, and also animated the title sequence for Casino Royale.

In 1968 his studio won accolades for the animated segments in Tony Richardson's epic feature film about the Crimean War, The Charge of the Light Brigade (1968), which Williams described as "the best job I ever had". Film critic Vincent Canby described Williams' work as “marvellous animated line drawings, done in the style of patriotic mid-19th-century cartoons".

In the late 1960s and early 1970s, Williams hired and brought to London a number of the great Hollywood animators from the 1930s, elderly men who were by then nearing retirement. These included Art Babbitt (Goofy), Grim Natwick (Betty Boop), and Ken Harris (Wile E. Coyote). Babbitt, in particular, gave masterclasses at Williams' studio at 13 Soho Square, training a new generation of animators.

Following the 1967 release of Disney's The Jungle Book, Williams first met master animator Milt Kahl, with whom he would become friends. Kahl had animated Shere Khan, the tiger, and Williams knelt down to polish his shoes. But Kahl said to him: “You can stop cleaning my shoes because you draw better than I do; but then you can clean them some more because you can't animate.”

TV commercials provided Richard Williams Animation with its main source of income. Although Williams despised the form, director Clive Donner persuaded him to raise his game. Following a successful commercial for Guinness beer, set in London's Royal Albert Hall, which won multiple awards, William's studio became well known for commercials, bringing characters such as Cresta Bear to life.

=== 1970s: A Christmas Carol and The Pink Panther ===
In 1971, Williams directed the Academy Award-winning A Christmas Carol, an animated adaptation of Charles Dickens's 1843 novella. The design of the film was based upon the original 1843 engravings. A Christmas Carol was broadcast on U.S. television by ABC on December 21, 1971, and released theatrically soon after. In 1972, it won the Academy Award for Best Animated Short Film.

In around 1973, Williams fell out with his business partners over the feature film Nasruddin, and began to re-imagine the story, which soon morphed into a new tale about a mute thief who is obsessed with stealing three golden balls which protect an ancient city from invasion. Williams animated many of the scenes himself, and spent years perfecting a single scene in which the villainous vizier ZigZag shuffles a deck of cards.

In 1975, Williams animated the title credits for Blake Edwards' The Return of the Pink Panther, and in 1976 his studio completed the animated credits for The Pink Panther Strikes Again. Art Babbitt, who was working for Williams at the time, described his employer's talent: "He's a director, designer, animator, and has a good layman's knowledge of music. He's a dreamer. He has more to learn as far as animation is concerned, but God, he can draw like a bastard".

In 1976, Williams did the illustrations for Idries Shah's English translation of the stories of Nasrudin, titled The Exploits of the Incomparable Mullah Nasruddin.

In 1977, Williams directed the full-length animated feature film Raggedy Ann & Andy: A Musical Adventure (1977), in which his daughter Claire played the part of Marcella.

=== 1980s: Who Framed Roger Rabbit ===
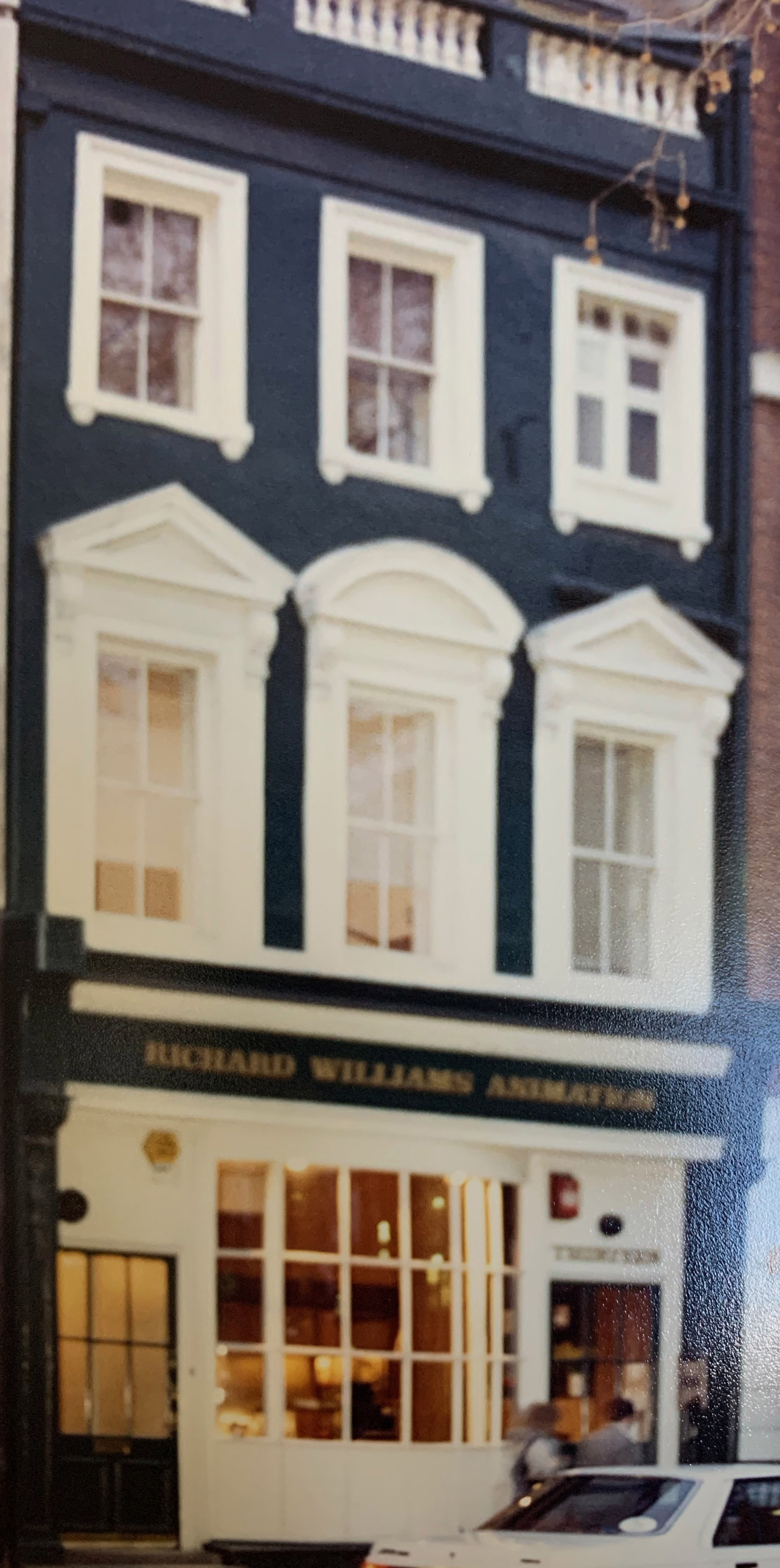
Richard Williams Animation in 1985

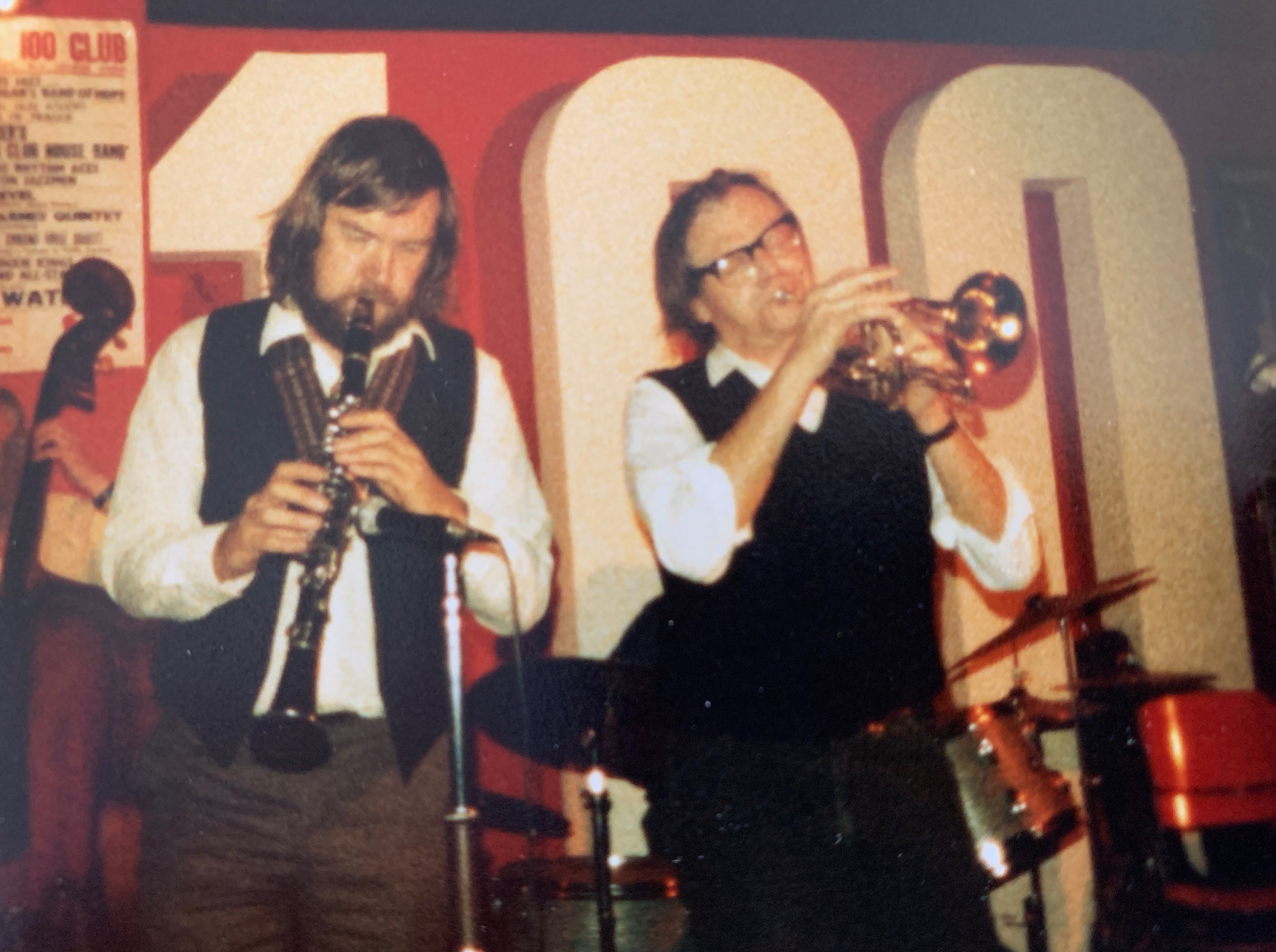
Richard Williams at the 100 Club with his band DixSix in 1985

In 1982, Williams directed Ziggy's Gift, a television special in which Ziggy takes a job as a sidewalk Santa. The film won an Emmy Award, and in the same year he appeared in a Thames Television documentary titled Richard Williams and The Thief Who Never Gave Up.

In 1987, Williams embarked on his biggest project to date, becoming animation director on the Disney/Spielberg film Who Framed Roger Rabbit (1988). Williams was initially reluctant to work on the film: when pitched the idea, Williams said to executive producer Steven Spielberg and director Robert Zemeckis "I just hate animation and live-action together; it just doesn't work, it's ugly". As he did not want to move to Los Angeles, production was moved to London.

Williams designed the characters for the film, including Jessica Rabbit. He said of Jessica that she was "the ultimate male fantasy, drawn by a cartoonist. I tried to make her like Rita Hayworth; we took her hair from Veronica Lake, and Zemeckis kept saying, 'What about the look Lauren Bacall had?'" Blessed with tremendous energy, Williams barely slept and worked through multiple nights to get the animation finished on time.

In 1988, another documentary was released about Williams, titled I Drew Roger Rabbit. In 1989, following the success of Who Framed Roger Rabbit, Williams won two more Academy Awards for his work, a joint award for Best Special Effects, shared with Ken Ralston, Ed Jones and George Gibbs and a Special Achievement Award. Williams said "I'm (in) the same business as Goya and Rembrandt. I may be rotten at it with nothing of the same quality or talent, but that's my business".

Apart from animation, Williams's great passion was Dixieland jazz. He led an ensemble in London named Dix Six that played regular gigs at venues such as the PizzaExpress Jazz Club, The 100 Club, and the Britannia Hotel in Grosvenor Square.

=== 1990s: The Thief and the Cobbler, Completion Bond's seizure, Miramax's Arabian Knight ===
Williams' magnum opus, a hand-animated epic inspired by the Arabian Nights and with the production title The Thief and the Cobbler, was begun in 1964, initially self-funded. In a 1989 interview, Williams shared his intent for the film: "I’m just trying to do what they call a 'masterpiece'. When you master a medium in the old days, if you were a master painter, then you did your masterpiece... It's an old-fashioned... 'I’ve mastered this medium at last, and I’m going to do a masterpiece.' I hope, if I can ever finish the thing." He further clarified that the project was not done out of obsession: "I'm just a throwback to an old craftsman, who wants to make a pot right, or a painting right."

As a largely non-verbal feature meant for an adult audience, The Thief was dismissed at first as unmarketable. After over twenty years of work, Williams had completed only twenty minutes of the film, and following the critical success of Who Framed Roger Rabbit, Williams sought and secured a production deal with Warner Bros. in 1988. However, the production went over deadline, and in 1992, with only 15 minutes of footage left to complete, The Completion Bond Company, who had insured Warners' financing of the film, feared competition from the similarly themed Disney film Aladdin, which was scheduled to open on the same day, and seized the project from Williams in Camden, London.

Completion Bond then had animator Fred Calvert supervise the animation process in Korea. New scenes were also animated to include several musical interludes. Calvert's version was released in South Africa and Australia in 1993 as The Princess and the Cobbler. Miramax (which was owned by Disney at the time) then acquired rights to the project and extensively rewrote and re-edited the film to include continuous dialogue, as well as many cuts to lengthy sequences. Miramax's product was released in North America in 1995 under the title Arabian Knight. For a long time, Williams preferred not to discuss the film in detail.

Following the collapse of The Thief, Williams closed his company and left the UK for his native Canada, moving with his wife Imogen and their two children to a house in Fulford Harbour on Salt Spring Island, British Columbia, where the family lived for five years. To earn a living, Williams began to host animation masterclasses, in which he combined his skill as an animator with his talent on the stage, performing around 30 events around the world.

In 1992, Williams was awarded an honorary doctorate by the Royal College of Art. In 1997 Williams moved back to the UK, living first in Pembrokeshire and later moving to Bristol, where he would remain until the end of his life.

=== 2000s and 2010s: The Animator's Survival Kit, Prologue, Lysistrata, and final work ===
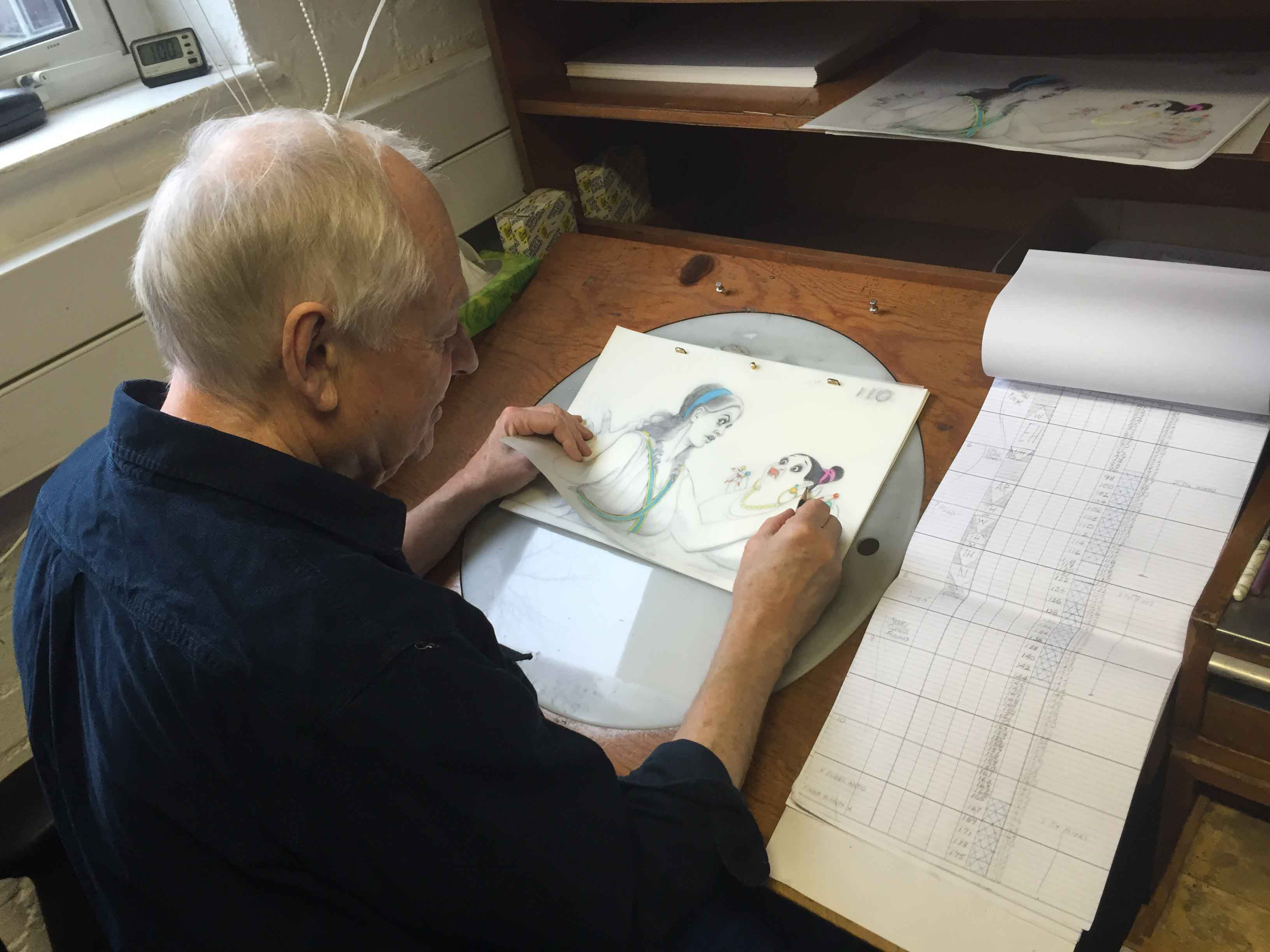
Richard Williams at Aardman Animation in 2015, at work on Prologue.

The notes for Williams' masterclass formed the basis for a book on the art of animation and, in 2002, Faber & Faber published Williams' acclaimed animation how-to book, The Animator's Survival Kit, with an "expanded edition" following in 2009. The book soon became a key reference for animators, both in print and later on as a DVD box set and an iPad application. The historian Kevin Brownlow described the ASK as “utterly riveting, even to a layman.”

From 2008, Williams began to work as artist in residence at Aardman Animations in Bristol, where he worked at one of his original 1938 Disney animation desks. Aardman co-founder Peter Lord described Williams as exemplifying "pure creativity, he seemed to us to work without compromise and for the sheer love of his chosen art-form. No deadlines, except the ones he set himself, nobody to please or answer to, except himself. [He was] our special guest, our resident celebrity". Even in his 80s, Williams continued to work every day, and do a full day's work. He liked to enter his office at Aardman by the fire escape "just to avoid people".

In 2010, Williams completed his 9-minute short film titled Circus Drawings, first begun in Ibiza in the early 1950s. The silent film, with live accompaniment, premiered at the Pordenone Silent Film Festival in Italy in September 2010.

On December 10, 2013, the director's cut of The Thief and the Cobbler, a workprint of the film, subtitled "A Moment in Time", was screened in Los Angeles. Williams participated in the event. However, a final, finished version of the film as Williams had long envisioned would never be completed.

In 2015, his short film Prologue received both an Oscar nomination and a BAFTA nomination in the category of best animated short. Prologue was the first six minutes of his hand-drawn feature film Lysistrata, based on the ancient Greek comedy by Aristophanes, which Williams joked should be sub-titled "Will I Live to Finish It?". Williams described Prologue as "the only thing so far in my career that I’ve ever really been pleased with." In 2013 Williams told The Guardian, "All I need is some time and five or six assistants who can draw like hell." The film was intended to be "grim but funny and salacious and sexy". Like his version of The Thief and the Cobbler, Prologue would never be completed. But, as Williams put it: "it's the doing of it that matters. Do it for the love of it. That's all there is".

Williams' final film Lysistrata, a six-minute short, was posthumously previewed at the 2026 Annecy International Animation Film Festival.

== Personal life and death ==
Williams married four times. His marriage to Stephanie "Tep" Ashforth in the early 1950s was short-lived; she was reluctant to move to London with him, choosing to remain in Ibiza. In London he met his second wife, Lois Catherine Steuart, daughter of the U.S. diplomat George Hume Steuart; they were married in 1966, and had two children, Alexander Williams, born in 1967, and Claire Williams, born in 1969. Divorce followed in 1976.

In 1976 he married a third time, to Margaret French, from Missouri, with whom he had two more children: Timothy Williams, born in 1976, and Holly Williams, born in 1978.

Toward the end of his life, he lived in Bristol with his fourth wife, Imogen Sutton, with whom he had two more children, Natasha Sutton-Williams and Leif Sutton-Williams.

Williams died of cancer on August 16, 2019, at his home in Bristol, England, still creating until the very end.

== Filmography ==
Animated shorts and features

- The Little Island (1958) (director, writer, producer, animator)
- Love Me, Love Me, Love Me (1962) (director, producer, animator)
- A Lecture on Man (1962) (director, writer, producer, animator)
- The Apple (1963) (designer, storyboard artist)
- Diary of a Madman (unfinished, Kenneth Williams narration was broadcast by BBC Radio 4, 1991)
- The Dermis Probe (1965) (director, editing, script Idries Shah)
- Sailor and the Devil (1965) (director, producer)
- The Ever-Changing Motor Car (1965) (writer)
- I.Vor Pittfalks, the Universal Confidence Man (not completed)
- A Christmas Carol (TV movie) (1971) (director, producer) (Oscar win)
- Raggedy Ann & Andy: A Musical Adventure (1977) (director, production supervisor, animator)
- Ziggy's Gift (TV movie) (1982) (director, producer, voice of Crooked Santa)
- Who Framed Roger Rabbit (1988) (animation director, voice of Droopy)
- Tummy Trouble (1989) (voice of Droopy)
- The Thief and the Cobbler (1993) (director, screenplay, producer, lead animator, voice of Laughing Brigand)
- Circus Drawings (2010) (director, animator)
- Prologue (2015) (director, animator) (Oscar nomination)
- Lysistrata (2026) (writer, animator, voice actor) posthumous release

=== Titles in live-action films ===
- What's New Pussycat? (1965) (titles)
- The Liquidator (1965) (titles)
- A Funny Thing Happened on the Way to the Forum (1966) (title designer)
- The Spy with a Cold Nose (1966) (title designer)
- Casino Royale (1967) (titles, montage effects)
- Sebastian (1968) (titles)
- Here We Go Round the Mulberry Bush (1968) (title designer)
- 30 Is a Dangerous Age, Cynthia (1968) (graphic titles effects)
- The Charge of the Light Brigade (1968) (title animation)
- Prudence and the Pill (1968) (titles)
- Can Heironymus Merkin Ever Forget Mercy Humppe and Find True Happiness? (1969) (animation director: title sequence)
- Every Home Should Have One (1970) (titles and animated sequences)
- The Return of the Pink Panther (1975) (title animation)
- The Pink Panther Strikes Again (1976) (title animation)

== See also ==
- Independent animation

== Bibliography ==
- The Exploits of the Incomparable Mullah Nasruddin by Idries Shah, Illustrated by Richard Williams. Picador (1976) ASIN: B00698X8LA Retrieved 14 October 2019
- The Animator's Survival Kit: A Manual of Methods, Principles and Formulas for Computer, Stop-motion, Games and Classical Animators, Faber and Faber, 2002 (expanded edition 2009, adding 'Internet' to the subtitle)
- Hunter, Martin, Bright Particular Stars: Canadian Performers, 15 Aug 2016 Retrieved 23 January 2020
