= The Animator's Survival Kit =

2001 educational book by Richard Williams

The Animator's Survival Kit: A Manual of Methods, Principles, and Formulas for Classical, Computer, Games, Stop Motion, and Internet Animators
- Original edition cover
- Author: Richard Williams
- Cover artist: Richard Williams
- Language: English
- Genre: Animation, Instruction
- Published: 2001 (Faber and Faber)
- Publication place: United States
- Pages: 379
- ISBN: 0-5712-0228-4

The Animator's Survival Kit: A Manual of Methods, Principles, and Formulas for Classical, Computer, Games, Stop Motion, and Internet Animators, or simply The Animator's Survival Kit, is an instructional book by animator and director Richard Williams. The book includes techniques, advice, tips, tricks, and general information on the history of animation.

== DVDs ==
Animation examples from the book combined with footage from Richard Williams' masterclasses have been put into a 16-volume DVD box set titled The Animator's Survival Kit – Animated. The logo from the book cover was completely animated in the traditional style, taking Williams and his animators 9 months to complete. Williams also included some early drafts of his own work from previous projects.

== Reception ==
The book was met with universal acclaim. Chris Wedge, the director of Epic and Ice Age, wrote about the book: "What I came out with was a complete re-structuring of animation, how I saw animation, how I analysed motion. People the first night sat down at their work stations and were running some of Richard's examples ... and at lunchtime you could see the influence. It was a revelation." It was also turned into an iPad app in 2013.

== See also ==
- Character animation
- Traditional animation
- Stop-motion animation
- Flash animation
- Computer animation
