= Maureen Gosling =

American documentary filmmaker

- Born: November 30, 1949 (age 76); Colorado Springs, Colorado, US
- Education: University of Michigan
- Occupations: Filmmaker, editor, director, producer
- Years active: 1972–present

Maureen Gosling (born 30 November 1949) is an American documentary filmmaker, editor, and director. She is best known for her 20-year collaboration with the late director Les Blank.

== Life and career ==
Gosling was born in Colorado Springs, Colorado. Her physician father was a jazz pianist and her mother, who worked in little theater, was a first generation American of Norwegian/Canadian descent. Gosling earned a BA in social anthropology from the University of Michigan in 1972 after which she became an apprentice to documentary filmmaker, Les Blank. Their first film together was in 1972, Dry Wood and Hot Pepper, on Black French Louisiana Zydeco music and Creole culture. Their best-known film is the 1982 British Academy Award-winning Burden of Dreams, about the German director Werner Herzog’s perilous filming of Fitzcarraldo in the Peruvian Amazon. In 1982, Burden of Dreams premiered at the Filmex film festival in Los Angeles. She was nominated for Best Editing by The American Cinema Editors for Burden of Dreams in 1983.

Gosling founded Intrépidas Productions in 1997, Yanga Productions with Maxine Downs in 2006, Sage Blossom Productions with Chris Simon in 2012, and Protesta Productions with Jed Riffe and Nina Menéndez in 2018.

In 1996, Gosling was an editing instructor in the Cinema Department at San Francisco State University, fall semester. She served on the board of Cine Acción, a Latino film organization from 1996 to 2002. She is a member of the Academy of Motion Picture Arts and Sciences 2019.

== Filmography ==
- 1973 - Dry Wood (sound, assistant editor)
- 1973 - Hot Pepper (sound, assistant editor)
- 1976 - Chulas Fronteras (assistant editor, translations)
- 1978 - Always for Pleasure (sound, assistant editor)
- 1979 - Del Mero Corazon (director, editor)
- 1980 - Poto and Cabengo (sound)
- 1980 - Werner Herzog Eats His Shoe (sound, editor)
- 1980 - Garlic Is as Good as Ten Mothers (sound, editor)
- 1982 - Burden of Dreams (co-filmmaker, sound, editor)
- 1983 - Sprout Wings and Fly (co-filmmaker, editor)
- 1984 - In Heaven There Is No Beer? (co-filmmaker, sound, editor)
- 1985 - Cigarette Blues (editor)
- 1986 - Huey Lewis and the News: Be-Fore! (sound, editor)
- 1987 - Gap-Toothed Women (co-filmmaker, sound, editor)
- 1987 - Ziveli! Medicine for the Heart (co-filmmaker, sound, editor)
- 1988 - Ry Cooder and the Moula Banda Rhythm Aces (sound, editor)
- 1989 - J’ai Eté au Bal / I Went to the Dance (co-filmmaker, sound, editor)
- 1990 - Yum, Yum, Yum! A Taste of Cajun and Creole Cooking (co-filmmaker, sound, editor)
- 1991 - Julie: Old Time Tales of the Blue Ridge (co-filmmaker, editor)
- 1991 - Marc & Ann (co-filmmaker, sound, editor)
- 1993 - A Skirt Full Of Butterflies (producer, director, editor with Ellen Osborne)
- 1994 - The Maestro: King of the Cowboy Artists (co-filmmaker, sound, editor)
- 1994 - My Old Fiddle: A Visit with Tommy Jarrell in the Blue Ridge (co-filmmaker, sound, editor)
- 1994 - Roots of Rhythm (sound)
- 1995 - The Hidden Cities of San Francisco: The Mission District (editor)
- 1998 - Stripped and Teased (editor)
- 1998 - The Way Home (editor)
- 1999 - Nuestro Camino (Our Own Road) (editor)
- 2000 - Blossoms Of Fire (director, producer, editor)
- 2000 - Bomba, Dancing the Drum (editor)
- 2001 - Boys Will Be Men (editor)
- 2002 - A Dream in Hanoi (editor)
- 2003 - Fallon: Deadly Oasis (editor)
- 2004 - Líderes Campesinas (editor)
- 2005 - Waiting To Inhale (editor)
- 2005 - Heart of the Congo (editor)
- 2006 - California’s “Lost” Tribes (co-writer, editor)
- 2008 - Poetry Inside Out (editor)
- 2010 - 5 Variations on a Long String (editor)
- 2010 - Cruz Reynoso: Sowing the Seeds of Justice (editor)
- 2010 - I Hear What You See (editor)
- 2011 - Smokin’ Fish (editor)
- 2011 - Painting the Streets of Bamako (co-filmmaker, editor)
- 2013 - This Ain’t No Mouse Music! (director, producer, editor with Chris Simon)
- 2014 - Racing to Zero (editor)
- 2015 - A New Color (editor)
- 1974/2015 - A Poem Is A Naked Person (sound, assistant editor)
- 2017 - The Long Shadow (co-creator, editor)
- 2018 - A Dangerous Idea (editor)
- 2020 - The Nine Lives Of Barbara Dane (director, editor)
- 2020 - Pleistocene Park (editor)
