= Always for Pleasure =

1978 film

- Directed by: Les Blank
- Produced by: Les Blank
- Cinematography: Les Blank; Maureen Gosling
- Edited by: Maureen Gosling
- Production company: Flower Films
- Release date: May 2, 1978
- Running time: 58 minutes
- Country: United States
- Language: English

Always for Pleasure is a 1978 documentary film by Les Blank about social traditions in New Orleans, Louisiana.

The film has footage of musical events, Mardi Gras Indians, a "jazz funeral" with traditional music, various second-line parades and cooking and eating of red beans and rice and a crawfish boil. Events filmed include New Orleans Mardi Gras and St. Patrick's Day 1977. Local musicians perform or are interviewed, including Kid Thomas Valentine, Allen Toussaint, Danny Barker, Blue Lu Barker, Irma Thomas, the Neville Brothers and Professor Longhair. The film profiles predominantly white second-line organizations whereas many other documentaries have falsely portrayed these traditions as the domain of mostly black groups.

The film subtitles a Creole song as "Hey Legba" although its title phrase is actually "Eh là-bas", a formerly common Louisiana Creole greeting roughly translated as "Hey you over there." However, in New Orleans, Legba was often referred to as "Papa La Bas", and some scholars such as Henry Louis Gates, believe that "Eh La Bas" is a covert reference to Legba.

Always for Pleasure was preserved by the Academy Film Archive in 1999.

The DVD rerelease includes additional performance footage of Professor Longhair.

== Cast ==
- Kid Thomas as Self (as 'Kid Thomas' Valentine)
- Allen Toussaint as Self
- Blue Lu Barker as Self (as 'Blue Lu' Barker)
- Irma Thomas as Self
- Professor Longhair as Self
- Amos Landry as Self
- George Landry as Self (as 'Chief Jolly' Landry)
- Booker Washington as Self
- Sylvester Martin as Self
- Aaron Neville as Self (as The Neville Brothers)
- Art Neville as Self (as The Neville Brothers)
- Charles Neville as Self (as The Neville Brothers)
- Cyril Neville as Self (as The Neville Brothers)
- Deacon John Moore as Self (as Deacon John)
- Dr. John as Self
- Les Blank as Self (uncredited)
- Maureen Gosling as Self (uncredited)
