= Blossoms of Fire =

- DVD cover
- Directed by: Maureen Gosling; Ellen Osborne
- Written by: Maureen Gosling; Toni Hanna
- Produced by: Maureen Gosling
- Cinematography: Xavier Pérez Grobet
- Edited by: Maureen Gosling
- Release date: 2000
- Running time: 75 minutes
- Countries: United States; Mexico
- Language: English / Spanish

Blossoms of Fire (also known as Ramo de fuego) is a 2000 documentary film about the people of Juchitán, Oaxaca, Mexico. The documentary was directed by Maureen Gosling and Ellen Osborne.

== Overview ==
Author Elena Poniatowska described the women of Juchitán de Zaragoza, a city in the Mexican state of Oaxaca, as “guardians of men, distributors of food.” Artists like Miguel Covarrubias and Frida Kahlo celebrated their beauty and intelligence. Blossoms of Fire shows them in their daily lives as they run their own businesses, embroider their signature fiery blossoms on clothing and comment on articles in the foreign press that depict them as a promiscuous matriarchy. In particular, an article in the Latin American version of ELLE Magazine infuriated the community during the time the filmmakers were shooting in 1994. Yet, it is expressed throughout the film by the women that they do not consider their society to be a matriarchy.

The people interviewed in this film share a common work ethic and independent streak rooted in Zapotec culture. The movie demonstrates powerful women, the region’s progressive politics, and a tolerance of homosexuality. Veteran film editor and former Les Blank collaborator Maureen Gosling and co-director Ellen Osborne tell of an indigenous community whose "flair for survival in the modern world is a fighting spirit and the undeniable influence of women."

=== Scenes ===
- A midwife laughs over a young husband’s behavior during birth,
- A gay man cheerfully asserts that “the mom’s in charge” in Juchitecan society
- Many proudly describe the challenges they face in their work and their families.

== Honors and special screenings ==
- World Premiere - San Francisco International Film Festival, Castro Theater, SF and Pacific Film Archive, Berkeley
- Coral Prize for Best Foreign Documentary About Latin America: Havana International Film Festival, Havana, Cuba.
- "Best Of"Sunnyside of the Doc Film Market, Marseille, France
- Award for Excellence - Society for Visual Anthropology, American Anthropological Association
- Best Documentary - Film Fest New Haven, Conn.
- Second Prize, Community Category, Terres en Vues First People's Festival, Montréal, Québec
- Prix Union Latine, Competition - La Cita Festival de Biarritz, Biarritz, France
- El Foro de la Cineteca Nacional, Mexico City, Mexico (One of 12 international films chosen to screen at this prestigious Forum.) The film toured Mexico with the other films for three months following.
- HBO Frame by Frame Series, The Screening Room, Manhattan
- Tour of the Mexican Republic, including Juchitán, Oaxaca, Mexico City, and dozens of venues in the southern Mexican states. Sponsored by the Mexican Film Institute (IMCINE). May–June 2001.
- HDerHumALC (Human Rights) Film Festival, Buenos Aires, Argentina.
- Toured with festival films to Lima, Peru (Dec. 2002)
- World Social Justice Forum in Porto Alegre and Belem, Brazil (Jan. 2003).

== Credits ==
- Producer, Director, Editor - Maureen Gosling
- Director, Co-Producer - Ellen Osborne
- Co-Producers - Toni Hanna, Maria Teresa García de la Noceda
- Cinematographer - Xavier Pérez Grobet
- Sound Recordist - Gabriela Espinoza
- Field Producer - Susana Vásquez Sánchez
- Associate Producer - Kelly Clement
- Fiscal Sponsor - Film Arts Foundation, San Francisco
- Featuring - the People of Juchitán and San Blas Atempa, Oaxaca
