= A Dangerous Idea: Eugenics, Genetics and the American Dream =

2016 documentary film about eugenics

- Directed by: Stephanie Welch
- Written by: Stephanie Welch, Andrew Kimbrell
- Produced by: Stephanie Welch, Jed Riffe
- Edited by: Maureen Gosling, Sara Maamouri, Stephanie Welch
- Music by: Jonathan Zalben
- Production companies: Paragon Media, Denkmal Film
- Distributed by: Bullfrog Films
- Release date: December 9, 2016 (Santa Fe Film Festival)
- Running time: 106 minutes
- Country: United States

A Dangerous Idea: Eugenics, Genetics and the American Dream is a 2016 documentary film about genetics, eugenics, and social inequality in the United States. The film was directed by Stephanie Welch and distributed exclusively by Bullfrog Films.

== Content ==
A Dangerous Idea claims that contemporary genetics is a resurgence of eugenics, and that the concept of the "gene" will eventually be regarded in the same unfavorable light as concepts such as "royal blood". The film further states that genetic research has been, and still is, misused by powerful groups to justify their mistreatment of the least fortunate, and to resist progress in racial and gender equality.

== Cast ==
The following people appear in the film as "featured experts":

- Garland Allen
- Ignacio Chapela
- Barry Commoner
- Troy Duster
- Fidelma Fitzpatrick
- Agustin Fuentes
- Ruth Hubbard
- Oliver James
- Van Jones
- Jay Joseph
- Evelyn Fox Keller
- Andrew Kimbrell
- James Le Fanu
- Joseph J. Levin Jr.
- Richard Lewontin
- Robert Pollack
- Robert Reich
- William H. Tucker

== Reception ==
Ralph Nader praised A Dangerous Idea, calling it "...an effective dissection of the genetic determinist worldview, rising again in new garb and aided by the Trump Administration." Sociologist Barbara Katz Rothman, describing the "gene myth", stated, "Yes, this is a dangerous idea - and if you want to better understand why, watch this film and see the history, development and presentation of this idea that there is a book of life, a program that determines, from the moment of conception, all that we are and can be." Molly Ladd-Taylor, writing in the American Historical Review, described the film as "a lively call to arms against genetic determinism and its role in the resurgence of racism and inequality in the Trump era." In a more mixed review, John DeFore of the Hollywood Reporter criticized the filmmakers for including so many interviews with critics of the scientists the film was criticizing, such as James Watson and Charles Murray.
