= Werner Herzog Eats His Shoe =

- Cover of The Criterion Collection release
- Directed by: Les Blank
- Written by: Werner Herzog
- Starring: Werner Herzog; Tom Luddy; Michael Goodwin; Alice Waters
- Release date: 1980
- Running time: 21 minutes
- Language: English

Werner Herzog Eats His Shoe is a 1980 short documentary film directed by Les Blank. It depicts German filmmaker Werner Herzog living up to his alleged vow to eat his shoe if Errol Morris ever completed the film Gates of Heaven.

== Development ==
Herzog said he made the vow to encourage Morris, who was then a graduate philosophy student at the University of California, Berkeley, to complete his film Gates of Heaven. At the time, Morris was having difficulty finding producers to fund the project. In Herzog on Herzog, he recalls telling Morris, "Stop complaining about the stupidity of producers, just start with one roll of film tomorrow. [...] And the day I see the finished work, I am going to eat my shoe."

Filmmaker Tom Luddy recalls Herzog making the bet in a less encouraging manner: "You'll never make a film, but if you do, I'll come and eat my shoe at the premiere." Luddy was then the director of the Pacific Film Archive at Berkeley and had become acquainted with Morris, a regular visitor. He introduced Morris to Herzog.

The nature of the vow has also been disputed by Morris, who has said that he does not recall the bet and that it was not what motivated him to complete Gates of Heaven. He also says that he asked Herzog not to eat the shoe. Nevertheless, he had originally planned to appear in the documentary, but decided against it after a flight delay. As a result, he was not involved in the project. Regardless of the exact details of the vow, it was not Herzog's first unusual promise: after a series of accidents during the filming of Even Dwarfs Started Small (1970), Herzog had agreed to jump into a cactus patch if the shoot was completed without further incident.

In an interview with filmmaker David Tamés, Blank recalled becoming acquainted with Herzog via Luddy, who had introduced his work to Herzog. Blank also recalled that Luddy told him Herzog was going to eat the shoe, which led Blank to seek permission from Herzog to shoot the film.

== Summary ==
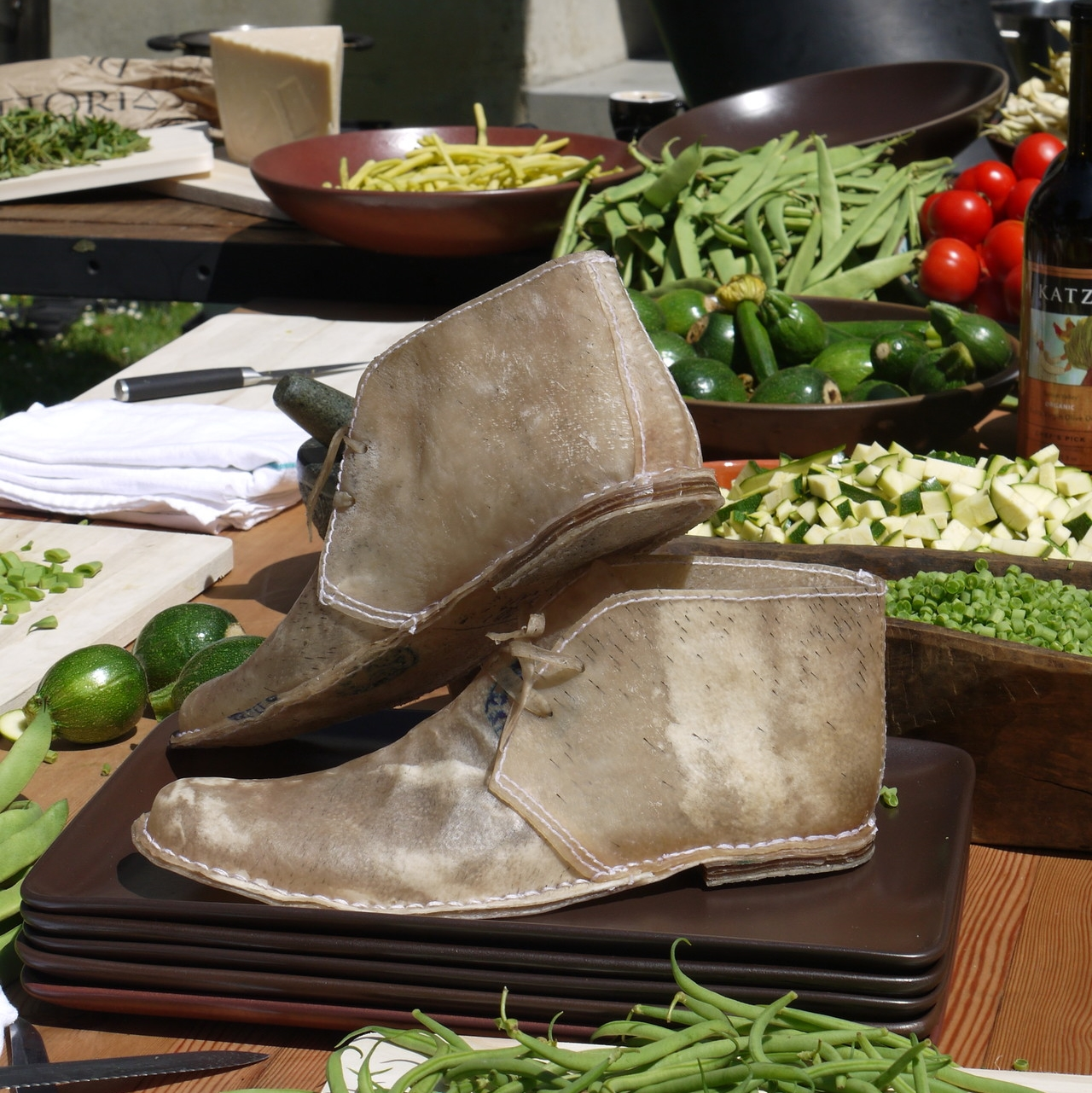
Replica of the titular shoes, created for the Chez Panisse 40th anniversary celebration in 2011

Filmed in April 1979, the movie features Herzog cooking his shoes at the restaurant Chez Panisse in Berkeley, California. He claims the shoes are the same pair he was wearing when he made the bet. Assisted by chef Alice Waters, Herzog boils the shoes with garlic, herbs, and stock for five hours. He is later shown eating one of the shoes in front of an audience at the premiere of Gates of Heaven at the nearby UC Theater. He does not eat the sole of the shoe, explaining that one does not "eat the bones of the chicken".

Interspersed into the film are clips from Gates of Heaven, Even Dwarfs Started Small, and the 1925 Charlie Chaplin film The Gold Rush, which features a shoe-eating scene. Unlike the leather shoe eaten by Herzog, the shoe featured in The Gold Rush was a prop made of licorice.

The soundtrack features the comic polka song "Old Whiskey Shoes", performed by Walt Solek. Les Blank would go on to direct In Heaven There Is No Beer?, a 1984 documentary about American polka culture that featured Solek and other polka musicians.

== Legacy ==
Blank went on to direct Burden of Dreams (1982), a feature-length documentary about Herzog and the making of Fitzcarraldo. Werner Herzog Eats His Shoe is included as an extra on the Criterion Collection edition of the Burden of Dreams DVD. It is also included as an extra in the Criterion Collection edition of the Gates of Heaven Blu-ray disc.

When Chez Panisse celebrated its 40th anniversary in 2011, a replica of the shoe was created, boiled, and eaten as part of the public anniversary celebration.

The Academy Film Archive preserved Werner Herzog Eats His Shoe in 1999.
