= A Poem Is a Naked Person =

- Film poster
- Directed by: Les Blank
- Production company: Les Blank Films
- Distributed by: Janus Films
- Release date: July 1, 2015 (New York City)
- Running time: 96 minutes
- Country: United States
- Language: English

A Poem Is a Naked Person is a 1974 American documentary film directed by Les Blank, filmed in 1972–1974 but not publicly released until 2015, after Blank's death. The film is a documentary about musician Leon Russell, produced and financed largely by Russell and his then-business partner Denny Cordell. Blank spent a large portion of two years on the film, but then its release was delayed for 40 years due to creative differences and music clearance problems. Blank's son, Harrod Blank (who was a child when the movie was filmed), spent years working on the clearances before it was shown publicly in 2015.

== Production ==
Blank and his assistant Maureen Gosling spent extensive time with Russell at his recording studio on Grand Lake o' the Cherokees in Oklahoma. Blank shot many hours of footage for the film, including the expected concerts, rehearsals, and interviews, but also atmospheric material intended to capture the mood and surroundings, later described by Harrod Blank as "what [Les] was attracted to: lake footage, sunsets, beautiful women, eccentric characters, Oklahoma folk". In addition to Russell, the film features appearances from musicians George Jones, Willie Nelson, Eric Andersen, Johnny Gimble, and Willis Alan Ramsey. A portion of the film depicts underground artist Jim Franklin painting a mural in Russell's empty swimming pool. The result was a non-traditional film, and its fate became uncertain after Russell and Cordell terminated their Shelter Records business relationship in 1976.

For many years, A Poem Is a Naked Person was shown only at special screenings with Les Blank in attendance. In 2011, Russell told Billboard that he didn't like the film and didn't intend to release it. Also in 2011, when the International Documentary Association honored Blank with a career achievement award, the film was described as "perhaps the greatest film about rock 'n' roll and American music that you will likely never see". The film received its public premiere (with Russell in the audience) in March 2015 at the South by Southwest festival in Austin, Texas, then had theatrical and DVD releases. The movie was released on DVD and Blu-ray by The Criterion Collection on March 29, 2016.

== Reception and legacy ==
In 1979, Robert Christgau wrote a lengthy article about Les Blank that for the most part praised Blank's work in his food-oriented documentaries, but included sharp criticisms of this film. Christgau derided it as an "arty horror movie of a documentary" that "abandons subtlety for an overstated visual gadgetry that screams repulsion out of control".

When the film was released, however, critical reception was positive. Writing for Film Comment, Daniel Eagan noted the "extraordinary concert footage" of "intimate, sweaty, incantatory music shaped for the moment at hand" as well as studio footage with "a different sense of intimacy, of polished professionals displaying casual, almost effortless expertise". Carson Lund of Slant Magazine praised it as "a free-floating portrait of the eccentric neo-Gospel Oklahoman frying pan that is Russell's mini-universe". Alex Pappademas of Grantland stated it was "one of the greatest rock documentaries I’ve ever seen, as eloquent an evocation of the reality-distortion field around rock stars as D.A. Pennebaker’s Dont Look Back or Robert Frank’s Cocksucker Blues, but funnier and stranger than either".

== See also ==
- List of American films of 1974
- Concert film
