= Highlander II: The Quickening =

1991 film by Russell Mulcahy

- Theatrical release poster
- Directed by: Russell Mulcahy
- Screenplay by: Peter Bellwood
- Story by: Brian Clemens; William N. Panzer
- Based on: Characters by Gregory Widen
- Produced by: Peter S. Davis; William N. Panzer; Jean-Luc Defait
- Starring: Christopher Lambert; Virginia Madsen; Michael Ironside; Sean Connery; John C. McGinley; Allan Rich
- Cinematography: Phil Méheux
- Edited by: Hubert de La Bouillerie; Anthony Redman
- Music by: Stewart Copeland
- Production companies: Davis/Panzer Productions; Lamb Bear Entertainment
- Distributed by: InterStar
- Release dates: 12 April 1991 (United Kingdom); 1 November 1991 (United States)
- Running time: 100 minutes
- Countries: United States; France; Argentina
- Language: English
- Budget: $22 million
- Box office: $15.6 million (US)

Highlander II: The Quickening is a 1991 science fiction film directed by Russell Mulcahy and starring Christopher Lambert, Virginia Madsen, Michael Ironside and Sean Connery. It is a sequel to the 1986 fantasy film Highlander. Set in the year 2024, the film follows Connor MacLeod as he regains his youth and immortality and sets out to free Earth from the corrupt operators of an artificial ozone layer.

The film was released on 12 April 1991 in the United Kingdom and on 1 November in the United States. Most of the filming was done in Argentina amid the country's economic woes, leading to the movie's investors and completion bond company taking over production. The resulting film was panned by critics and fans and is considered to be one of the worst films ever made. The following film, Highlander III: The Sorcerer, ignores the events of Highlander II. Several cuts have since been made to address plot inconsistencies and special effects.

== Plot ==
Five hundred years ago on the planet Zeist, sorcerer Juan Sánchez-Villalobos Ramírez leads a rebellion against the corrupt leadership of General Katana. Using the Quickening, he creates a bond with fellow rebel Connor MacLeod that even death cannot break. Katana and his troops crush the rebellion and put Ramírez and MacLeod on trial. They are banished to Earth to live as immortals, where they fight each other until only one survives. The winner faces a choice to remain on Earth as a mortal or return to Zeist with their crimes forgiven.

By 1999, Earth is devastated by industrial pollution and a damaged ozone layer. Millions die, including Connor's wife Brenda Wyatt MacLeod. No longer immortal, Connor supervises a scientific team headed by Dr. Allan Neyman which creates an electromagnetic shield. Earth is protected from radiation but shrouded in darkness, heat, and humidity. In 2024, the Shield Corporation is run by David Blake, and it imposes heavy fees on countries for continued protection.

An elderly Connor is approached by Louise Marcus, the leader of an anti-shield group. They believe the ozone layer has recovered, and the Shield Corporation is lying about it to maintain their revenue. Connor refuses her request for help because he is too old and disapproves of her group's methods.

Katana sends two immortal assassins to kill Connor, to prevent his return to Zeist. Connor decapitates them and the quickening restores his youth. Before making love to Louise, Connor calls out for his former mentor. Ramírez appears where he died in Glencoe, Scotland, briefly interrupting a performance of Hamlet. Finding his way to Connor and Louise, and the trio devise a plan to destroy the shield.

Katana arrives on Earth and makes an uneasy alliance with Blake in exchange for Connor's head. Blake imprisons Dr. Neyman. Connor, Ramírez, and Louise break into the prison and are led into a trap. Ramírez sacrifices himself to save Connor and Louise. Connor and Katana duel. When Connor beheads Katana, he uses the quickening energy to destroy the shield. As the world returns to normal, Connor asks Louise to come with him to Zeist.

== Cast ==
- Christopher Lambert as Connor MacLeod
- Sean Connery as Juan Sánchez-Villalobos Ramírez
- Virginia Madsen as Louise Marcus
- Michael Ironside as General Katana
- Allan Rich as Allan Neyman
- John C. McGinley as David Blake
- Philipp Brock as Cabbie
- Rusty Schwimmer as Drunk
- Ed Trucco as Jimmy
- Pete Antico as Corda
- Peter Bucossi as Reno

Steven Grives and Jimmy Murray portray characters playing Hamlet and Horatio respectively in the scene where Ramírez is resurrected.

== Production ==
William N. Panzer and his producing partner, Peter S. Davis, began developing a sequel under the working titles of Highlander II: Yellowknife and Highlander 2020. At the 1987 MIFED (Mercato internazionale del film e del documentario) , Davis/Panzer Productions pre-sold most of the film's rights for the United Kingdom, Scandinavia, Australia, Japan and Benelux to Vestron Inc. for $18 million. Vestron would also handle French home video distribution. Rights for Italy, Germany, Greece, and Portugal were sold to Filmauro, Highlight Communications, Nea Kinisi, and Lusomondo respectively. The United States release would be through New Century/Vista Film Co.. Filming was planned for the summer of 1988 with a theatrical release target for 1989.

During the 1988 Cannes Film Festival, Panzer and Davis were approached by distributors from France, Germany, and the United Kingdom who were eager for updates on a sequel as Highlander had been a sizable hit in their territories. The producers were disheartened by the cold shoulder from Hollywood studios, but foreign distributors were enthusiastic backers.

=== Writing ===
William Panzer recalled, "We had story ideas but nothing more than broadstrokes. We wanted Ramirez back. We knew it would take place in the future, a notion springing from our shared vision of domed cities and polluted atmospheres." Russell Mulcahy and Christopher Lambert were enthusiastic about the project due to its larger budget and Panzer's concept.

As the screenwriter of Highlander, Gregory Widen had the right of first refusal on a sequel, but he had other commitments. Larry Ferguson and Peter Bellwood also turned down offers to write the screenplay. Various screenwriters like Edward Khmara drafted scripts for the sequel, but Mulcahy and Lambert felt each draft got worse.

The definitive ending of Highlander was problematic for a sequel. Panzer insisted the Prize in the original film should be that Connor MacLeod becomes mortal and is allowed to die. Funding for a sequel was also contingent on the return of Sean Connery, despite his character's beheading in the first movie.

Brian Clemens finally solved the script problems. In 1991, Mulcahy singled out his addition of the planet Zeist to explain the immortals as a "masterstroke". However, in 2009 he told Empire magazine, "I thought the planet Zeist stuff was completely stupid - it was such a cop out." Panzer, Bellwood, and Mulcahy all further revised the screenplay. Mulcahy contributed the aerial battle of the "Flying Blades" which he salvaged from his unfilmed adaptation of The Wild Boys.

The resulting film contradicts Highlander. The immortals are no longer humans with a nature connection that makes them impervious to all threats save beheading. They are now aliens from the planet Zeist. Davis blamed the alien retroactive continuity on Panzer. Ramírez is now depicted as an alien sorcerer and inexplicably resurrected. The "Quickening" is no longer just energy that provides immortality, it is also a magical bond between souls. It allows Ramírez to return from death when MacLeod needs him.

=== Filming ===
Highlander II was scheduled to start shooting in Argentina on January 8, 1990. In late 1989, preparations were well underway. Sets and costumes were created. When hyperinflation flared up again in Argentina, Panzer and Davis were spooked and froze production in January 1990. In February, the completion bond company insisted on moving forward. They ordered filming to begin in a month.

Kurt Woolner of Film Finance estimated inflation alone cost Highlander II $3 million. When Film Finance took control of the production it was already $10 million over budget. Woolner recalled, "In 'Highlander,' it was a case of taking a movie to a geography that could not support it."

Filming began in Argentina on March 1, 1990. Sean Connery agreed to return for $3 million for six days of work but would not come to the set or acknowledge the film's existence unless the money was placed in escrow. His salary actually ballooned to $3.5 million when footage of his opening scene was damaged. The insurance company Gaebel, Watkins, and Taylor, Inc. paid for the overage.

The sets of Highlander II have been compared to those of Ridley Scott's Blade Runner. Christopher Lambert and Michael Ironside struggled with their broadswords and injured each other during their fight scene. John C. McGinley regretted the decision to lower his character's voice as deep as possible in an effort to sound like Orson Welles.

While filming in Argentina, the bond company's control over production was not too much of an issue for the cast and crew. In the editing bay and during pick-up filming, they sidelined Russell Mulcahy and drastically changed parts of the story.

Lambert threatened to quit but was pressured to finish the job. Mulcahy hated the final product so much he walked out of the film's world premiere. Mulcahy summed up his regret about the sequel, "It's like they say in the film 'There can only be one.' In a genre film you can create any scenario you like, but once you break your own rules, the audience feels betrayed, which is what happened with HIGHLANDER II."

== Release ==
=== UK release ===
Highlander II: The Quickening was released in the UK on 12 April 1991 with a runtime of 100 minutes. This version was distributed by Entertainment Film Distributors and ran 8 minutes longer than the US cut.

As well as a very different scene order this version included additional footage not seen in the later US Theatrical release, including a flashback to the death of Connor's previous wife Brenda, a sequence of Connor and Louise going above the shield, and the alternate "Fairytale Ending" mentioned above.

Despite this longer version running in UK theatres, all home video releases in the country to date have been of the shorter 91-minute US Theatrical Release (running 86 minutes due to PAL speedup). This includes the rental VHS (EVV 1203), retail VHS (EVS 1072), laserdisc (PLFEB 37011), and DVD (EDV 9119).

=== United States release ===
Highlander II: The Quickening was released in the United States on 1 November 1991 with a runtime of 91 minutes, distributed by InterStar Releasing. It was the first film InterStar distributed. InterStar spent $4 million on the prints and advertising campaign. This version was edited down by the bond company, with many scenes rearranged throughout. Despite the many cuts made to this version the bond company also added two new scenes that further fleshed out the villain, General Katana. These scenes include Katana taunting Connor in his Zeist prison cell, and Connor and Katana meeting at the grave of Connor's dead wife, Brenda.

This version was released many times in the US, including on VHS, laserdisc, and Video8. All DVD and Blu-Ray releases of the film in the United States have been of the longer "Renegade" and "Special Edition" versions.

=== Marketing ===
A $1 million television advertising campaign was run for the release of the film.

=== Home media ===
In the United States, the theatrical cut was released on VHS on 13 May 1992 by Columbia TriStar Home Video, and was reissued on 13 April 1994 by Hemdale Home Video. The Renegade version was released on VHS by Republic Home Entertainment in 1997.

== Alternative versions ==
The theatrical release of Highlander II was so problematic that it prompted multiple revisions. The screenplay contradicted the original film. Highlander III: The Sorcerer continued contradicting the narrative of the series. Russel Mulcahy eventually created a director's cut of Highlander II that fans consider canon.

=== Alternate ending ===
Some European theaters showed a final scene which became known as "The Fairy Tale Ending". Connor tells Louise he will return to Zeist and convinces her to come with him. As they kiss, they start to glow and transform into streaks of light heading into outer space. The Special Edition DVD includes an early version of this scene.

=== European theatrical release ===
In the European theatrical release, the opening segment includes a scene where Brenda Wyatt (Connor MacLeod's lover from the first film) is dying from solar radiation. She makes MacLeod promise to stop the ozone crisis before dying. Additional scenes include MacLeod and Marcus climbing through a tunnel to get above the Shield to find the ozone layer has returned to normal. The ending shows MacLeod returning to Zeist after destroying the Shield, bringing Louise with him.

=== Renegade Version ===
In 1995, a 108-minute cut of the film became known as the Renegade Version. The Renegade Version was reconstructed largely from existing material. Certain scenes were removed and others added back in and entire sequences of events were changed. All references to the Immortals being aliens from another planet called Zeist were eliminated.

The cast and crew reassembled to film a new battle between MacLeod and Katana atop a moving vehicle after they escape the security facility. Russell Mulcahy maintains he was not involved in the re-shoots. The new footage included MacLeod and Louise climbing through a mountain tunnel to emerge above the Shield to confirm that the radiation levels are back to normal. The new version removes a major continuity gaffe from the theatrical version, which had merged two separate sword fights between MacLeod and Katana into one longer climactic battle. The director's cut version restores them to two separate battles, although it never shows how or when MacLeod reacquired his katana.

=== Special Edition ===
Producers Panzer and Davis revisited Highlander II once again in 2004. Dubbed the "Special Edition", this cut was nearly identical to the Renegade Version, but with a few alterations, such as the introduction of new CGI special effects throughout the film, including a now-blue shield as originally intended, and a small piece of voice-over work by Lambert. As the original cut of the film is no longer distributed, many fans in later years have only had the Renegade Version and Special Edition available to watch.

Reviewing the 2004 "Special Edition" DVD, David Ryan of DVD Verdict gave it a score of 69 out of 100 and said that "[this] is the best version of this film that [the producers] can make with the material they have on hand. It's still not a particularly good film—but it's infinitely superior to the original version... What was once a horrible, horrible film has become downright tolerable, and actually somewhat entertaining at times."

== Reception ==
=== Box office ===
In the UK, the film opened on 187 screens and grossed £1.3 million in its opening weekend. The film was released months later in the US on 1 November 1991, and opened at number 3, grossing $5.3 million in 960 theaters in the opening weekend. It grossed a total of $15.6 million in the United States and Canada.

=== Critical response ===
In the Chicago Sun-Times, Roger Ebert gave the film 0.5 stars, "Highlander II: The Quickening is the most hilariously incomprehensible movie I've seen in many a long day — a movie almost awesome in its badness. Wherever science fiction fans gather, in decades and generations to come, this film will be remembered in hushed tones as one of the immortal low points of the genre...If there is a planet somewhere whose civilization is based on the worst movies of all time, Highlander 2: The Quickening deserves a sacred place among their most treasured artifacts." Variety dismissed the sequel as derivative, comparing the Quickening to the Force, "some settings, especially those on Zeist, look tatty enough to belong to a 1950s sci-fi film."

The Los Angeles Times commented, "It makes clearer much that was so vague in the original; it even jokes about how confusing its premise is. In short, audiences who made the first film successful enough to warrant a second will be getting a bit more for their money." Screen International concluded, "Telling a coherent and logical story seems to be the least of Mulcahy's concerns", and mused that Sean Connery was the film's saving grace.

Vancouver Sun savaged the "intensely stupid" movie and joked that Lambert "has two expressions: a sullen pout that means either "I love you," "I'm going to cut off your head" or "What's my line?" and a sly smile that suggests he has wet himself." The review riffed on the other leads, "Ironside, in a sea of over-the-top performances, pulls a Jack Nicholson impression/parody that leaves Christian Slater in the dust." Virginia Madsen is "only there so Lambert doesn't have to kiss Sean". It concluded, "Connery, the old pro, just swashbuckles his way through the whole mess, eyes twinkling and charming the audience into submission. He may be a whore when it comes to choosing roles, but he's a high-priced one and worth every penny. Recommended if you like Iron Maiden, monster-truck shows and wretched excess."

Retrospectively, Den of Geek summed up the movie's legacy, "It's not even 'so bad it's good' territory, it skips right past that into the 'so awful you can't look away for fear you'll both be killed' territory...it also runs the entire franchise into the ground and retcons the first film into oblivion in the space of 15 minutes...This is a film that wishes it could be as good as Santa Claus Conquers the Martians." IGN gave the Renegade Version 2 stars out of 10, "How bad is this movie? Well, imagine if Ed Wood were alive today, and someone gave him a multi-million dollar budget."

Christopher Null gave the film 1 star and mused that the Highlander franchise "become a bit of a joke, and here's where the joke started." Reel Film Reviews gave the film two stars, "It's hard to imagine Highlander II appealing to non-fans of the first film...it's nowhere near as bad as it's been made out to be over the years."

The film's Rotten Tomatoes score is 0% based on 22 reviews. It scored 31 out of 100 on Metacritic based on 14 reviews.

== See also ==
- List of 20th century films considered the worst
- List of films with a 0% rating on Rotten Tomatoes
