= Persistence of Vision (film) =

- Directed by: Kevin Schreck
- Based on: The Thief and the Cobbler by Richard Williams
- Produced by: Kevin Schreck
- Cinematography: Kevin Schreck
- Edited by: Maureen Gosling; Kevin Schreck
- Music by: Adi Yeshaya
- Production company: Kevin Schreck Productions
- Release date: October 4, 2012 (Vancouver International Film Festival)
- Running time: 83 minutes
- Countries: Canada; United Kingdom; United States
- Language: English

Persistence of Vision is a 2012 documentary film based on animator Richard Williams' ill-fated attempts to produce his film The Thief and the Cobbler. Directed by Kevin Schreck, its tagline is "the untold story of the greatest animated film never made". The film premiered in Canada on 4 October 2012 at the Vancouver International Film Festival.

== Synopsis ==
Canadian animator and filmmaker Richard Williams struggled to finish his masterpiece, a long-term vanity project called The Thief and the Cobbler. Originally entering production in 1964 as an adaptation of middle-eastern folk tales, the project continued to grow in scope and complexity over several decades while Williams and his studio sought proper funding. In 1988, Williams was hired as animation director on the hit film Who Framed Roger Rabbit, and his long-laboured project was finally given the greenlight by Warner Bros.

Unfortunately, Williams' meticulous attention to detail, as well as the forthcoming release of Disney's similarly themed Aladdin, proved to be too much for the studio, and on May 15, 1992, after three decades of work, Williams and his team were fired from the project. The film was then recut and hastily released in various editions which bore little resemblance to Williams' original vision. Williams himself retired from animation and refused to speak about the film for several years afterward. He eventually released a bestselling instructional book, The Animator's Survival Kit, and became a legendary mentor and instructor to a whole new generation of animators.

Though Williams did not participate in the making of the film, archival footage of him is combined with interviews of his co-workers.

== Cast ==
- Omar Ali-Shah (archive footage)
- Art Babbitt (archive footage)
- Howard Blake
- Richard Burdett
- John Culhane
- Antonia Dewhurst
- Greg Duffell
- Charles Fleischer (archive footage)
- Julianna Franchetti
- Ken Harris (archive footage)
- Roy Jackson (archive footage)
- Chris Knott
- Ramon Modiano
- Roy Naisbitt (archive footage)
- Brent Odell
- Philip Pepper
- Michael Schlingmann
- Richard Williams (archive footage)
- Robin Williams (archive footage)
- Robert Zemeckis (archive footage)

== Reception ==
Drew Taylor of IndieWire called the film "a heartbreaking account" and a "Herculean accomplishment". The Globe and Mail rated the film 3.5/4 stars and called the film "gripping". Jeff Shannon of The Seattle Times rated the film 3.5/4 stars and described it as "engrossing" and "surprisingly suspenseful".

=== Awards ===
Year	Nominee / work	Award	Result
2013	Persistence of Vision	Buffalo International Film Festival Audience Award for Best Of Festival	Won
2013	Persistence of Vision	Buffalo International Film Festival Audience Award for Best Documentary	Won

== See also ==
- 2012 in film
- The King and the Mockingbird - the 1980 French animated film by Paul Grimault also similar in production time
- List of films with longest production time
