= All in This Tea =

- Directed by: Les Blank; Gina Leibrecht
- Produced by: Les Blank; Gina Leibrecht
- Cinematography: Les Blank
- Edited by: Gina Leibrecht
- Production company: Flower Films
- Distributed by: Flower Films
- Release dates: April 14, 2007 (Ashland); June 27, 2008 (United States)
- Running time: 70 minutes
- Country: United States
- Language: English

All in This Tea is a 2007 documentary film co-directed by Les Blank and Gina Leibrecht, about Chinese tea. It follows the American tea connoisseur David Lee Hoffman as he travels to remote tea-growing areas of China. Hoffman attempts to interest Chinese tea growers and distributors in fair trade issues, and explores the importance of terroir and organic growing methods in both the quality and future sustainability of the Chinese tea market.

The film premiered at the San Francisco International Film Festival in 2007.

== Production ==
The documentary was filmed with a hand-held camera on digital video and is 70 minutes in length.

== Critical response ==
On Rotten Tomatoes, the film has a rating of 83%, based on 12 reviews, with an average rating of 7/10. As well as entertainment ratings, All in This Tea has been praised by some in the industry as well as some in academia. For example, Kim Stanton, of the University of North Texas Libraries, writing for the Educational Media Reviews Online writes that she "highly recommends" it for those with an interest in food studies, anthropology, business studies, environmental science and studies on modern China. Les Blank and Gina Leibrecht are regularly praised for their passion on the subject.

== See also ==
- Garlic Is as Good as Ten Mothers
