= Burden of Dreams =

1982 documentary film

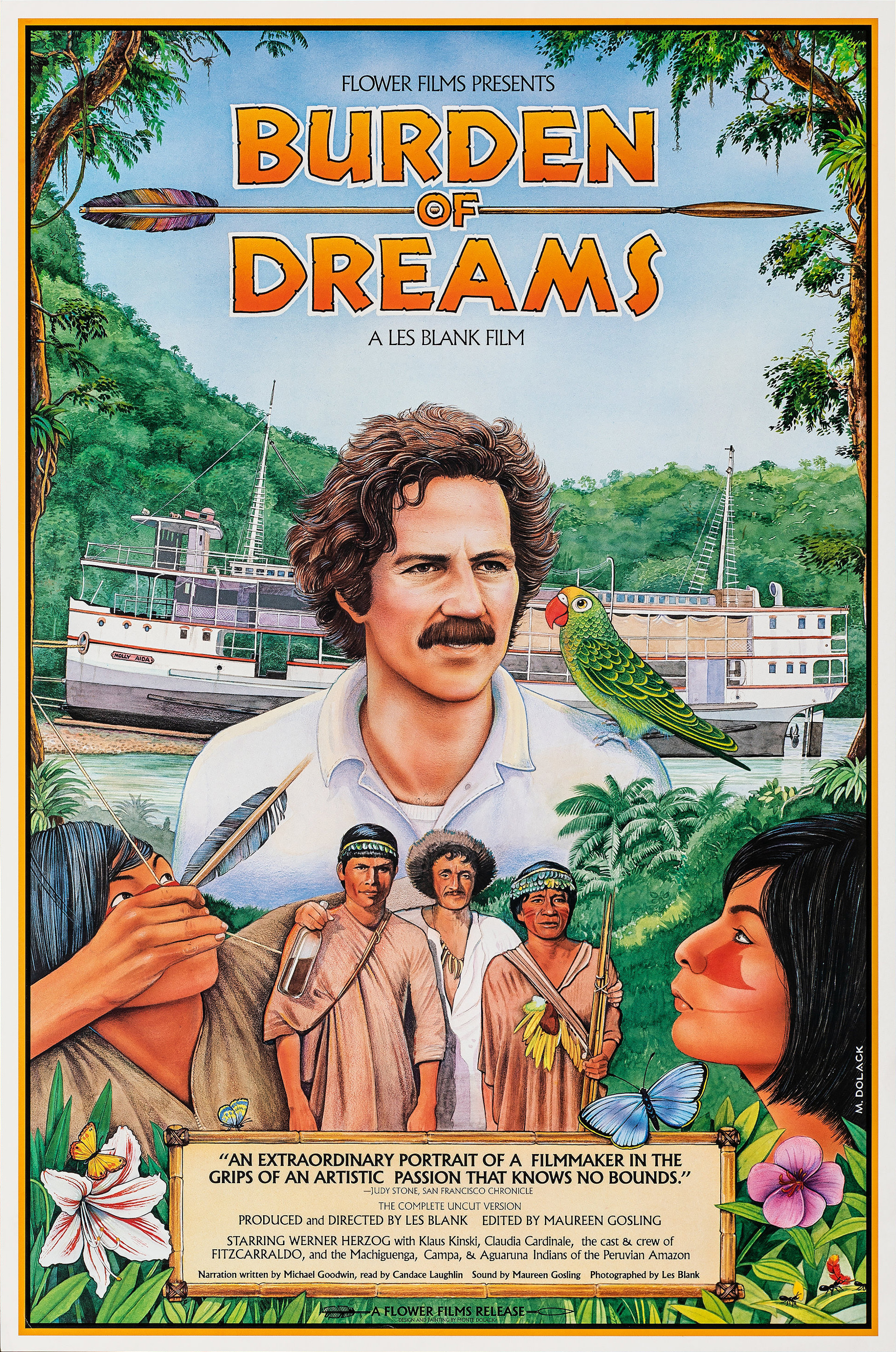
- Theatrical release poster
- Directed by: Les Blank
- Written by: Michael Goodwin (narration)
- Produced by: Les Blank
- Starring: Werner Herzog; Klaus Kinski; Claudia Cardinale; Jason Robards; Mick Jagger
- Narrated by: Candace Laughlin
- Cinematography: Les Blank
- Edited by: Maureen Gosling
- Distributed by: Flower Films
- Release date: May 30, 1982
- Running time: 95 minutes
- Country: United States
- Languages: Spanish; English; German; Portuguese

Burden of Dreams is a 1982 making-of documentary film directed and produced by Les Blank. It recounts the troubled production of the 1982 Fitzcarraldo directed by Werner Herzog, while shooting on location in Peru.

== Synopsis ==
The film is a making-of documentary about the chaotic production of Werner Herzog's 1982 film Fitzcarraldo. It was filmed on location in the jungles of Peru during production of Herzog's film.

== Cast ==
- Werner Herzog as Self
- Klaus Kinski as Fitzcarraldo / Self
- Claudia Cardinale as Molly / Self
- Jason Robards as Fitzcarraldo
- Mick Jagger as Wilbur
- Mariano Gagnon as Self

== Production ==
During production on the documentary, director Les Blank and his small crew became exhausted and exasperated from the stress of the work. Blank said he felt "unconnected to the people around me". Keeping up with the antics of Herzog and Klaus Kinski (the star of Fitzcarraldo) proved difficult for the reserved, introverted Blank. By the last week of the shoot, he was so burnt out that he feared he would come out of production "like some Viet Nam veterans, horribly calloused". He wrote in his journal: "I'm tired of it all and I couldn't care less if they move the stupid ship – or finish the fucking film".

Blank often asked Herzog to repeat statements while being filmed that he originally made off-camera. In a 2009 interview with Jesse Pearson for Vice magazine, Blank was asked to recall a scene in the documentary in which Herzog delivers a monologue about the violence and destruction of the jungle around him. Blank said Herzog had originally made a similar monologue in the middle of a canoe ride, away from cameras, but Blank liked the speech enough to coax it out of Herzog again. "When the moment was right," Blank told Vice, "I pulled him aside and said 'Can I do a little interview?' And he said 'Sure.' Goodwin [the interviewer] led him around to something that sparked him off on that tangent again. That's how we got the speech."

The film's poster was created by Montana artist Monte Dolack.

== Reception and legacy ==
On review aggregator website Rotten Tomatoes, Burden of Dreams has an approval rating of 89%, based on reviews from 18 critics, with an average score of 8.7/10.

Roger Ebert awarded the film four out of four stars, writing that "Blank...is unafraid to ask difficult questions and portray Herzog, warts and all".

The film received the 1983 British Academy Film Award for Best Documentary, and it was named Best of Festival at the San Francisco Film Festival the same year.

The Academy Film Archive preserved Burden of Dreams in 1999.

In 2022, the film was spoofed by the Emmy Award-nominated mockumentary series Documentary Now as the two-part episode Soldier of Illusion. The spoof involves acclaimed German filmmaker Rainer Wolz (Alexander Skarsgard) trying to film a documentary about residents of the Russian Ular mountains, while simultaneously directing the pilot of an upcoming sitcom called Bachelor Nanny.

A restored version of the film was screened at the MAMI Mumbai Film Festival 2024 under the Restored Classics section.

== See also ==
Other documentaries about troubled movie productions:

- Hearts of Darkness: A Filmmaker's Apocalypse, about the making of Apocalypse Now
- Lost Soul, about the making of the 1996 version of The Island of Dr. Moreau
- Lost in La Mancha, about the failed attempt to make The Man Who Killed Don Quixote
- Jodorowsky's Dune, about the troubled pre-production and unsuccessful adaptation of Frank Herbert's novel Dune
- Empire of Dreams, about the complicated production of Star Wars
- Persistence of Vision about the epically-long production of the animated cult classic The Thief and the Cobbler
