= Garlic Is as Good as Ten Mothers =

Garlic Is As Good As Ten Mothers
- Theatrical release poster
- Directed by: Les Blank
- Produced by: Les Blank
- Production company: Flower Films
- Distributed by: Flower Films
- Release date: 1980
- Running time: 51 minutes
- Country: United States

Garlic Is as Good as Ten Mothers is a 1980 documentary film about garlic directed by Les Blank. Its official premiere was at the 1980 Berlin Film Festival.

== Production ==
It was filmed at the Gilroy Garlic Festival in Gilroy, California, as well as in other locations in Northern California. The director recommends that, when the film is shown, a toaster oven containing several heads of garlic be turned on in the rear of the theater, unbeknownst to the audience, with the intended result that approximately halfway through the showing the entire theater will be filled with the smell of garlic.

The title is a shortened form of the saying "Garlic is as good as ten mothers... for keeping the girls away."

== Reception and legacy ==
Robert Taylor for the Oakland Tribune called the film "an intoxicating mixture of food and music, serious and comic styles."

In 2004, the film was selected for preservation in the United States' National Film Registry by the Library of Congress as being "culturally, historically, or aesthetically significant." The Academy Film Archive preserved Garlic Is as Good as Ten Mothers in 1999.

In Blank's 1982 film Burden of Dreams, a documentary chronicling the filming of Fitzcarraldo, director Werner Herzog and other crew members can be seen wearing "Garlic Is as Good as Ten Mothers" T-shirts.

== See also ==
- All in This Tea
