= Completion guarantee =

Form of insurance used in filmmaking

In filmmaking, a completion guarantee, sometimes referred to as a completion bond, is a form of insurance offered by a completion guarantor company in return for a percentage fee based on the budget. It is often used in independently financed films to guarantee that the producer will complete and deliver the film (based on an agreed script, cast and budget) to the distributor(s) thereby triggering the payment of minimum distribution guarantees to the producer. The money is received by the bank/investor who has cash flowed the guarantee, at a discount, to the producer to trigger production.

== Use ==
The producer will agree to deliver a film (based on an agreed script/cast/budget) to a distributor in respect of certain territories in consideration (inter alia) for payment of a "minimum distribution guarantee" payable at the point in time when the producer has delivered the completed film. This called a negative pick-up agreement because funds are provided once the distributor picks up the film negative from the production company.

The producer obviously requires such funds upfront to finance the film so the producer takes the signed distribution contract to a bank/financier and will effectively use it as collateral against a production loan. It is at this stage that the bank will require a completion bond to be executed to provide them with the required level of security against the risk of non-delivery by the producer. The parties to the completion bond agreement are typically the producer, the financier(s), the completion guarantor company and the distributor(s).

These methods of funding can be complicated and expensive due to legal costs, bank fees, and interest. The bond fee itself is negotiable but is typically 3–5% depending on the risks as assessed by the completion guarantor. For these reasons, completion bonds are typically used on mid- to high-budget independent films.

Key to the completion guarantor company's risk assessment process will be a careful scrutiny of key persons on the production team to determine whether the film is "bondable". Of particular interest will be the director, first assistant director, line producer, production manager, producer, cast and cinematographer, since these personnel will ultimately be responsible for keeping the production on budget and on schedule.

The completion guarantor will require a regular (usually daily) flow of production paperwork—for example, production reports, cashflow and cost reports etc. Under the bond agreement, the completion guarantor has the contractual right to "take over the film" (which will include wide "hire and fire" rights over any personnel including the director) since they are financially liable if the film goes over budget. In extreme circumstances, films are sometimes finished by the completion guarantor company (this occurred during productions of Highlander II: The Quickening, The Thief and the Cobbler and Foodfight!)—an event that is traumatic for the crew and cast, and can be disastrous for a film's creative and commercial ambitions. However, completion guarantors also know that it is usually in their interests to work with an established production team to assist them to bring a production back onto schedule and within the agreed budget.
