= Allied Filmmakers =

British film production company

- Industry: Animation; Live action
- Founded: 1985; 41 years ago
- Founder: Jake Eberts
- Defunct: 2000
- Headquarters: London, England

Allied Filmmakers was a British film production (and finance) company, founded by Jake Eberts in London in 1985. It was a version of how Eberts originally intended Goldcrest Films to operate. In 1992 Chargeurs, who already owned Pathe, acquired 80% of Allied Filmmakers. After the closure of the company, Pathé held the rights to most of the companies output with a few exceptions. Eberts later founded a company called Allied Film.

== Filmography ==
- Hope and Glory (1987; uncredited) although the Independent, in Ebert's obituary, credits this film to Goldcrest.
- The Adventures of Baron Munchausen (1988)
- Last Exit to Brooklyn (1989)
- Driving Miss Daisy (1989; uncredited)
- Dances with Wolves (1990)
- The Nutcracker Prince (1990)
- Get Back (1991; music documentary of The Paul McCartney World Tour)
- City of Joy (1992)
- A River Runs Through It (1992)
- Super Mario Bros. (1993)
- The Thief and the Cobbler (1993)
- No Escape (1994; as Escape from Absolom in countries)
- James and the Giant Peach (1996)
- The Wind in the Willows (1996; a.k.a. Mr. Toad's Wild Ride in the United States)
- Grey Owl (1999)

=== Allied Films ===
- Chicken Run (2000; uncredited)
- The Legend of Bagger Vance (2000)

== See also ==
- About Jake Eberts in movies.yahoo.com.
