= The Thief and the Cobbler =

1993 unfinished film by Richard Williams

- An unreleased poster made near the end of the film's production, before it was taken from Williams
- Directed by: Richard Williams
- Written by: Richard Williams; Margaret French
- Produced by: Richard Williams (all versions); Imogen Sutton (all versions); Fred Calvert ("The Princess and the Cobbler" and "Arabian Knight" cuts); Harvey Weinstein ("Arabian Knight" cut)
- Starring: Sara Crowe; Anthony Quayle (original version); Matthew Broderick; Jennifer Beals; Jonathan Winters ("Arabian Knight" cut); Vincent Price (all versions)
- Cinematography: John Leatherbarrow
- Edited by: Peter Bond
- Music by: David Burman; Peter Shade; David Cullen; Robert Folk
- Production companies: Richard Williams Productions; Allied Filmmakers; The Completion Bond Company
- Distributed by: Majestic Films ("The Princess and the Cobbler" cut); Miramax Family Films (Arabian Knight cut) Orange Cow Productions ("Recobbled Cut")
- Release dates: 13 May 1992 (Original Workprint); 23 September 1993 (The Princess and the Cobbler); 25 August 1995 (Arabian Knight); September 2013 (Recobbled Cut Mark 4); 21 June 2023 (Recobbled Cut Mark 5)
- Running time: 91 minutes (Original Workprint); 80 minutes (The Princess and the Cobbler); 72 minutes (Arabian Knight); 100 minutes (Recobbled Cut Mark 4/Mark 5)
- Countries: United Kingdom; United States; Canada
- Language: English
- Budget: $28 million
- Box office: $669,276

The Thief and the Cobbler is a 1993 unfinished animated musical fantasy film co-written and directed by Richard Williams, who intended it to be his magnum opus and a milestone in the animated medium. Originally devised in the 1960s, the film was in and out of production for almost three decades due to independent funding and ambitiously complex animation. It was finally placed into full production in 1989 when Warner Bros. agreed to finance and distribute the film after his successful animation direction for Who Framed Roger Rabbit. When production went over budget and behind schedule, and Disney's similarly-themed Aladdin loomed as imminent competition, Williams was forced out and the film was heavily re-edited and cheaply finished by producer Fred Calvert as a mainstream Disney-style musical. It was eventually released by Allied Filmmakers on 23 September 1993 in South Africa and Australia under the title The Princess and the Cobbler. Two years later, on 25 August 1995, Miramax Family Films, which was owned by Disney at the time, released another re-edit titled Arabian Knight in the United States. Both versions performed poorly at the box office and received mixed reviews.

Over the years, various companies and individuals, including Roy E. Disney, have discussed restoring the film to its original version. In 2013, the Academy of Motion Picture Arts and Sciences archived Williams's own 35 mm workprint. Williams acknowledged the film's rehabilitated reputation, due to projects like The Recobbled Cut, a restoration by Garrett Gilchrist, and Persistence of Vision, a 2012 documentary by Kevin Schreck detailing the production.

The Thief and the Cobbler is one of the films with the longest production times. It is the final film for several actors and artists, including animators Ken Harris (died 1982), Errol Le Cain (died 1989), Emery Hawkins (died 1989), Grim Natwick (died 1990), and Art Babbitt (died 1992), and actors Felix Aylmer (died 1979), Eddie Byrne (died 1981), Clinton Sundberg (died 1987), Kenneth Williams (died 1988), Sir Anthony Quayle (died 1989), and Vincent Price (died 1993, one month after the film's initial release). It has maintained a cult following since its release.

== Plot ==
In a kingdom at the Arabian desert, the prosperous Golden City is ruled by the narcoleptic King Nod and protected by three golden balls atop its tallest minaret. According to a prophecy, the city would fall to "destruction and death" if the balls were removed, and could only be saved by "the simplest soul with the smallest and simplest of things." Living in the city is a cobbler, Tack, and a nameless, unsuccessful yet persistent Thief, who are both mute.

When the Thief sneaks into Tack's house, the two get stitched together and stumble outside, causing Tack's tacks to fall onto the street. Zigzag, King Nod's Grand Vizier, steps on one of the tacks and orders Tack to be arrested while the Thief escapes. Tack is brought before King Nod and his daughter, Princess Yum-Yum. She saves Tack from execution by deliberately breaking a shoe and ordering him to fix it. While Tack performs the repair work, he and Yum-Yum become increasingly attracted to each other, much to the jealousy of Zigzag, who plans to take over the kingdom and marry the princess.

Meanwhile, the Thief, having noticed the golden balls atop the minaret in the courtyard, breaks into the palace through a gutter. He steals the repaired shoe from Tack, prompting the cobbler to chase him through the palace. Upon retrieving the shoe, Tack bumps into Zigzag, who notices the shoe is fixed and imprisons Tack in a cell.

From left to right: Tack the Cobbler, Zigzag the Grand Vizier, King Nod, and Princess Yum-Yum. The character designs are a combination of UPA and Disney styles, and the overall style and flat perspective are inspired by Persian miniature paintings.

The One-Eyes, a race of warlike, cycloptic monsters, led by their leader, Mighty One-Eye, plan to destroy the city and have already slaughtered much of its frontier guard, all except for one mortally wounded soldier who escapes to warn the city; King Nod has a vision of them the next morning. While Zigzag tries to convince Nod of the kingdom's security, the Thief steals the balls after several attempts, only to lose them to Zigzag's minions. Tack escapes from his cell using his cobbling tools during the ensuing panic. King Nod notices the balls' disappearance when the soldier warns them of the invading One-Eyes. Zigzag attempts to use the stolen balls to negotiate Yum-Yum's hand in marriage in exchange for returning the balls, but when King Nod dismisses him, Zigzag defects to the One-Eyes and gives them the balls instead.

King Nod sends Yum-Yum, her nurse, and Tack to ask for help from a "mad and holy old Witch" in the desert. They are secretly followed by the Thief, who hears of a golden idol on the journey but fails to steal it. In the desert, they discover a band of dimwitted brigands led by Chief Roofless, whom Yum-Yum recruits as her bodyguards. Meanwhile, at the camp of the One-Eye, Zigzag is sent into a pit of alligators at the orders of Mighty One-Eye as a test to see if he can charm beasts like he claims. Tack and the others reach the hand-shaped tower where the Witch lives and learn that Tack is prophesied to save the Golden City. The Witch also presents a riddle—"Attack, attack, Tack! A tack, see? But it's what you do with what you've got!"—before destroying the entire tower with a storm cloud. Elsewhere, Zigzag makes his way out of the pit, with the alligators now at his command, leaving Mighty One-Eye impressed and convinced. They then start planning their attack on the Golden City, with Mighty declaring that Zigzag "shall ride at the front".

Tack and Yum-Yum's group then return to the Golden City to find the One-Eyes and their massive war machine approaching, with Zigzag on horseback leading the charge. Tack shoots a single tack into the enemy's midst, sparking a Goldberg-esque chain reaction that destroys the entire One-Eye army including the war machine. In the midst of this, the Thief, avoiding death with almost every step, steals the golden balls from the collapsing machine. Zigzag tries to escape but falls into a pit, where he is eaten alive by the alligators and his pet vulture, Phido. Mighty One-Eye is betrayed and presumably killed by his own slave women by sitting on him as revenge for treating them as furniture. The Thief then runs into Tack while escaping with the balls, and after a brief scuffle, the Thief, deciding that the balls are not worth the trouble, reluctantly gives up and leaves them with Tack. With peace restored and the prophecy fulfilled, the city celebrates as Tack and Yum-Yum get married; Tack finally says, "I love you" in a baritone voice. The film ends with the Thief stealing the reel of the film and running away.

== Cast ==
Character	Original version (The Thief and the Cobbler)	Fred Calvert version^{f} (The Princess and the Cobbler)	Miramax version^{f} (Arabian Knight)
Princess Yum-Yum	Sara Crowe	Bobbi Page; Sara Crowe (one vocalisation, uncredited)^{b}	Jennifer Beals (speaking); Bobbi Page (singing)
Tack the Cobbler	Unknown (only one line)^{a}	Steve Lively	Matthew Broderick (speaking); Steve Lively (singing)
The Thief	Unknown (only grunts/wheezes)^{c}	Ed E. Carroll	Jonathan Winters
King Nod	Anthony Quayle	Clive Revill; Anthony Quayle (one scene, uncredited)^{d}	Clive Revill; Anthony Quayle (one scene, uncredited)^{d}
Mighty One-Eye	Christopher Greener	Kevin Dorsey	Kevin Dorsey
Zigzag the Grand Vizier	Vincent Price; Richard Williams (additional dialogue, uncredited)		
Princess Yum-Yum's Nurse	Joan Sims	Mona Marshall; Joan Sims (some vocalisations, uncredited)	Toni Collette
Phido	Donald Pleasence	Donald Pleasence	Eric Bogosian; Donald Pleasence (few squawks)
Mad and Holy Old Witch	Joan Sims	Mona Marshall; Joan Sims (some lines)^{e}	Toni Collette
Chief Roofless	Windsor Davies	Windsor Davies	Windsor Davies
Dying Soldier	Clinton Sundberg	Clinton Sundberg	Clinton Sundberg; Unknown (additional dialogue, uncredited)
Goblet	Kenneth Williams (Original version) Don Rickles (Miramax version)		
Tickle	Kenneth Williams (Original version) Don Rickles (Miramax version)		
Gofer	Stanley Baxter	Stanley Baxter	Stanley Baxter
Slap	Stanley Baxter	Stanley Baxter	Stanley Baxter
Dwarf	George Melly		
Hoof	Eddie Byrne	Eddie Byrne	Eddie Byrne
Hook	Thick Wilson	Thick Wilson	Thick Wilson
Goolie	Frederick Shaw	Frederick Shaw	Frederick Shaw
Maiden from Mombasa	Margaret French		
Laughing Brigand	Richard Williams (uncredited)	Richard Williams (uncredited)	Richard Williams (uncredited)
Other Brigands	Joss Ackland; Peter Clayton; Derek Hinson; Declan Mulholland; Mike Nash; Dermot Walsh; Ramsay Williams	Joss Ackland (Uncredited); Peter Clayton; Geoff Golden; Derek Hinson; Declan Mulholland; Mike Nash; Tony Scannell; Dermot Walsh; Ramsay Williams; Rik Mayall (uncredited)	
Narrator	Felix Aylmer	Unknown (uncredited)	Matthew Broderick
Singers for the Brigands		Randy Crenshaw; Kevin Dorsey; Roger Freeland; Nick Jameson; Bob Joyce; Jon Joyce; Kerry Katz; Ted King; Michael Lanning; Raymond McLeod; Rick Charles Nelson; Scott Rummell	

=== Notes ===
^aAccording to Richard Williams, Sean Connery was set to record Tack's one line, but never showed up at the studio, so the line was instead performed by a friend of his wife's. Connery's name remained credited as Tack in the end credits of the "Recobbled Cut" version before being removed.

^bWhile Yum-Yum's dialogue was mostly re-voiced by Bobbi Page for the Allied Filmmakers version, one vocal effect from Crowe is retained when Yum-Yum throws her pear at Zigzag in disgust during the polo game.

^cIn both of the 1992 workprints, the Thief is heard making short grunts/wheezes in a few scenes—though not as many as in the Allied Filmmakers version. Actor Ed E. Carroll did additional ones for the Allied Filmmakers version.

^dAlthough Quayle's voice was mostly re-dubbed by Clive Revill in the re-edited versions of the film by Allied Filmmakers and Miramax, Quayle's uncredited voice can still be heard for an entire scene when King Nod gives a speech to his subjects. Revill also re-recorded some of his lines for the Miramax version, mostly discussing the Witch being related to the Mighty One-Eye and "the bearer of his other eye".

^eSims' voice for the Witch was mostly re-dubbed by Marshall, but a few lines spoken by Sims were retained after she first fully materializes and when she receives her chest of money all the way up to the part when she's in a basket lighting a match to the fumes. Unlike the nanny, Sims was still credited in the Calvert cut.

^f Fred Calvert is credited on both of these versions.

The 1978 International Film Guide mentions that Vincent Price, Felix Aylmer, Donald Pleasence, and Anthony Quayle were cast in The Thief and the Cobbler. The 1979 International Film Guide mentions that Ramsay Williams, Thick Wilson, Peter Clayton, Windsor Davies, Mike Nash, Frederick Shaw, Dermot Walsh, Kenneth Williams, and Stanley Baxter were part of the cast.

Hilary Pritchard was initially cast as Yum-Yum and is listed in some of the original drafts of the script and a 1989 Cannes brochure. By the time of the 1992 workprints, she had been replaced by Sara Crowe. Pritchard's name was still retained in the credits of the "Recobbled Cut" version, until Mark 5 when Sara was finally credited.

Similarly, Miriam Margolyes was initially billed as the Maiden from Mombasa, but the workprint features co-writer Margaret French as the Maiden.

According to animator Michael Sporn, Paul Matthews was an African-American delivery person with a deep, dark voice whom Williams met in an elevator on the way to a rehearsal space during production on Raggedy Ann and Andy: A Musical Adventure. Matthews had not done any acting before, and so Williams had promptly cast him as the Mighty One-Eye. Not long afterward, however, Williams, wanting to go in a different direction, replaced Matthews' voice with "England's tallest man" Christopher Greener (mistakenly credited as Christopher Greenham or Chris Greenham in several pamphlets promoting the film) as the Mighty One-Eye. Matthews is still credited as the Mighty One-Eye in the "Recobbled Cut" version.

Catherine Schell and Thick Wilson (who was also the voice of Hook in this film) were proposed as the voices for Princess Mee-Mee, the sister of Princess Yum-Yum, and the enchanted ogre Prince Bubba, respectively, in an early draft of the film. Both characters were dropped in 1989 at the request of Warner Bros.

Many of the minor characters, such as Goblet, Gofer, Tickle, Slap, the Dying Soldier, and the alligators all have additional dialogue provided by currently unknown voice actors in the Miramax version. Additional characters exclusive to the Miramax version, including Zigzag's announcer is voiced by an unknown actor and the Thief's mother is voiced by Mickie McGowan, who is credited under "Loop Group" in the credits. Also, in the Miramax version, some lines from the brigands and the camel's laughter appear to be re-dubbed, again by unknown actors.

== History ==
=== Development and early production as Nasrudin (1964–1972) ===
In 1964, Richard Williams, a Canadian animator living in the United Kingdom, was running an animation studio assigned to animate commercials and special sequences for live-action films. Williams illustrated a series of books by Idries Shah, which collected the tales of Mulla Nasruddin, a philosophical yet "wise fool" of Near Eastern folklore from the 13th century. Williams began development work on a film based on the stories, with Shah and his family championing production. Production took place at Richard Williams Productions in Soho Square, London. In an early mention of the project, the 1968 International Film Guide told that Williams would soon begin work on "the first of several films based on the stories featuring Mulla Nasruddin".

Williams took on television and feature film projects in order to fund his project, and work on his film progressed slowly. Williams hired veteran Warner Bros. animator Ken Harris as a chief animator on the project, then titled The Amazing Nasrudin. Roy Naisbitt was hired as layout artist / art director for the film, and promotional art showed intricate Indian and Persian designs. In 1970, the production's name was changed to The Majestic Fool and British Lion Film Corporation became the earliest mentioned distributor candidate for the independent film. The International Film Guide noted that the Williams Studio's staff had increased to forty people for production of the feature. Williams gained further attention when he and the studio produced a TV adaptation of A Christmas Carol for Chuck Jones, which won the studio an Academy Award for Best Animated Short Film.

According to composer Howard Blake, Williams and the studio had animated around three hours of footage for what was now being called Nasrudin by 1972. Blake insisted to Williams that while he thought the footage was excellent, he needed to structure the film and his footage into a three-act plot.

=== Replacing the Nasruddin concept ===
The Nasruddin premise did not last as Williams and the Shahs had a falling out. The Shah family had a bookkeeper who was not keeping track of the studio's accounting, so Williams felt that producer Omar Ali-Shah had been embezzling financing from the studio for his own purposes. Further friction came because the Shah family had been asking for 50% of the profits from the film, and Idries's sister, author and folklorist Amina Shah, who had done some of the translations for the Nasrudin books, stated ownership of the stories. With her threatening with a copyright infringement lawsuit, Paramount Pictures withdrew a deal they had been negotiating, and Williams was forced to abandon Nasrudin as the Shah family took the rights of the source material. However, Williams was able to keep characters he designed for the books and the film, including a thief character.

In 1973, a promotional booklet was released with a public announcement by Williams about the status of his project:

Nasrudin was found to be too verbal and not suitable for animation, therefore Nasrudin as a character and the Nasrudin stories were dropped as a project. However, the many years work spent on painstaking research into the beauty of Oriental art has been retained. Loosely based on elements in the Arabian Nights stories, an entirely new and original film is now the main project of the Williams Studio. Therefore any publicity references to the old character of Nasrudin are now obsolete.

The film had many name changes before becoming The Thief and the Cobbler; other names included The Thief Who Never Gave Up and Once.... Older character designs, and characters that were later removed, are in the Once... logo.

In 1973, Williams commissioned a new script from Howard Blake, who wrote a treatment called Tin Tack that incorporated a character who is a clumsy cobbler named Tack, and retained Williams's thief character from Nasrudin. The script would later be scrapped, but the character of Tack would be incorporated in another script written by Margaret French, which would use characters from Nasrudin, including a sleepy king, a thief and an evil vizier originally named Anwar. Many scenes that did not include Nasrudin himself were also retained. Throughout the 1970s, Williams would further rewrite the script with Margaret French, his wife at the time.

Actor Vincent Price was hired to voice Anwar, later renamed "Zigzag". His dialogue was recorded in the summer of 1973, while he was filming Madhouse. Price was hired to make the villain more enjoyable for Williams, as he was a great fan of Price's work and Zigzag was based on two people whom Williams hated. In addition to Price, Sir Anthony Quayle was cast as King Nod.

The characters were renamed at this point. Zigzag speaks mostly in rhyme throughout the entire film, while the other characters—with the exceptions of the Thief and Tack, who are mute—speak normally. Williams stated that he did not intend to follow "the Disney route" with his film, saying that it would be "the first animated film with a real plot that locks together like a detective story at the end". He also said that with its two mute main characters, it was essentially "a silent movie with a lot of sound". Silent comedies, like films from Charlie Chaplin and Harry Langdon, were already an inspiration on Nasrudin and continued for the new film. Tack was modeled after said silent film stars.

British illustrator Errol Le Cain created inspirational paintings and backgrounds, setting the style for the film. During the decades that the film was being made, the characters were redesigned several times and scenes were reanimated.

=== Prolonged production (1973–1986) ===
In late 1973, financial difficulties forced the studio to focus primarily on various TV commercial, special and feature film title assignments, leaving Williams's film to be worked on as a side project. Since Williams had no money to have a full team working on the film, which was a "giant epic", production dragged for decades. Ken Harris was still chief animator on the film, as he had been since Nasrudin, and Williams would assign him sequences while he was supervising production on commercials. To save money, scenes were kept in pencil stage without colour, as advised by Richard Purdum: "Work on paper! Don't put it in colour. Don't spend on special effects. Don't do camera-work, tracing or painting... just do the rough drawings!" Williams was planning to later finish these sequences when the financing would come in.

Upon seeing Disney's The Jungle Book, Williams realised that he was not very skilled in animating and that he needed to actually learn the art, if he wanted to hold the audience's interest:

"I was a graphic artist in animation … thought I was ever so clever, until one day I realized I didn't know a damned thing. I couldn't suspend disbelief for more than 15 to 20 minutes. I thought I had better go and study 'how you do it'. So we did … and it was a nasty shock to realize when you thought you were wonderful and were covered with awards, that you didn't know how to do it, at all."

Williams hired veteran animators from the golden age of animation, such as Art Babbitt, Emery Hawkins and Grim Natwick, to work at his studio in London and help teach him and his staff. Williams learned also from Milt Kahl, Frank Thomas, Ollie Johnston, and Ken Anderson at Disney, to whom he made yearly visits and would later pass their knowledge to the new generation of animators. Williams also allowed animators like Natwick and Babbitt to work on the studio assignments, such as the 1977 feature Raggedy Ann & Andy: A Musical Adventure. The Mad Holy Old Witch was designed as a caricature of animator Grim Natwick, by whom she was animated. After Natwick died, Williams would animate the Witch himself.

As years passed, the project became more ambitious. Williams said that his idea was "to make the best animated film that has ever been made—there really is no reason why not". He also envisioned the film to feature very detailed and complex animation, the likes he thought no other studio would attempt to achieve. Additionally, much of the film's animation would be photographed "on ones", meaning that the animation would run at full 24 frames per second as opposed to the more common animation "on twos", in twelve frames per second.

In 1978, Saudi Arabian prince Mohammed bin Faisal Al Saud became interested in The Thief, and agreed to fund a ten-minute test sequence with a budget of $100,000. Williams chose the complex, penultimate sequence of the Thief in the War Machine for the test. The studio missed two deadlines, and the scene was completed in late 1979 for $250,000. Despite his positive impression of the finished scene, Faisal backed out of the production because of missed deadlines and budgetary overruns. Williams tried to use the War Machine sequence to attract more investors but they too backed out.

=== Financial backing inspired by Roger Rabbit's success ===
In the 1980s, Williams put together a 20-minute sample reel of The Thief, which he showed to Milt Kahl, a friend and one of his animation mentors, at Skywalker Ranch in Marin County. Star Wars producer Gary Kurtz briefly worked with Williams to attempt to get financing in the mid-1980s. In 1986, Williams met producer Jake Eberts, who began funding the production through his Allied Filmmakers company and eventually provided US$10 million of the film's $28 million budget. Allied's distribution and sales partner Majestic Films began promoting the film in industry trades under the working title Once....

At this time, Eberts encouraged Williams to make changes to the script. A subplot involving the characters of Princess Mee-Mee, Yum-Yum's identical twin sister voiced by Catherine Schell, and the Prince Bubba, who had been turned into an ogre and was voiced by Thick Wilson, was deleted, and some animation of the Witch had to be discarded. Also deleted was Ken Harris's sequence of a Brigand dreaming of a Biblical temptress.

Steven Spielberg saw the footage of The Thief and was impressed enough that he and Robert Zemeckis asked Williams to direct the animation of Zemeckis' film Who Framed Roger Rabbit. Williams agreed in order to get financing for The Thief and the Cobbler and get it finally finished. Roger Rabbit was released by Disney (under their Touchstone Pictures banner) in the United States on 22 June 1988 and became a blockbuster hit. Williams won two Oscars for his animation and contributions to the visual effects. Although Roger Rabbit ran over budget before animation production began, the success of the film demonstrated Williams's capability to work within a studio system and deliver high-quality animation within time and budget. Disney and Spielberg told Williams that in return for doing Roger Rabbit, they would help distribute his film. This plan did not come to pass. Disney began to put their attention more in their own feature animation, while Spielberg instead opened Amblimation, a rival feature animation studio in London.

Following his success, Williams and Warner Bros. negotiated a funding and a distribution deal for The Thief and the Cobbler, which included a $25 million marketing budget. Williams's current wife Imogen Sutton suggested him to finance Thief with European backers, citing his appreciation of foreign films. Richard insisted he could produce the film with a major studio. Williams and Warner Bros. signed a negative pickup deal in late 1988, and Williams also received financial aid from Japanese investors. He later said: "In hindsight we should have just gone to Europe, take another five years, made it on our own, and then go to a distributor and get people who find it as a novelty".

=== Production under Warner Bros. (1989–1992) ===
This uncolourised scene is one of many that were animated by hand to move in three dimensions without CGI. The scene exists only in Williams's original, unfinished version, and was cut along with many others in the two released versions.

With the new funding, the film finally went into full production in 1989. Williams scoured for talented artists around the world. At this point, with almost all the original animators either deceased or having long since moved on to other projects, production began mostly with a new, younger team of animators, including Richard's own son Alexander Williams. In a 1988 interview with Jerry Beck, Williams stated that he had two and a half hours of pencil tests for Thief, and had not storyboarded the film since he found such a method to be too controlling. Williams cleared out the studio and made The Thief its entire and sole priority. He had turned down Disney to do another Roger Rabbit, and an offer to direct Beauty and the Beast.

Williams had experimented with shots with characters animated by hand to move in three dimensions, including in Roger Rabbit where the live action camera was moving all the time. With Thief, Williams began planning several sequences to feature a greater use of this technique, including Tack and the Thief's palace chase, which was achieved without computer-generated imagery. According to rumours, Williams approached The Thief with a live-action point of view, coming off Roger Rabbit. He was creating extra footage and extending sequences to trim down later, and would have edited down the workprint he later assembled.

Warner Bros. had signed a deal with the Completion Bond Company to ensure that the studio would be given a finished film, otherwise they would finish The Thief under their management. Dedicated but pressured, Williams was taking his time to ensure sequences would look perfect. Animators were working overtime, sometimes with sixty hours a week required, to get the film done. While Williams encouraged the best out of people, discipline was harsh and animators were frequently fired. Funders pressured Williams to make finished scenes of the main characters for a marketing trailer. The final designs were made for the characters at this time. Test animation of Princess Yum-Yum, as featured in the released versions, was traced from the live-action film Muqaddar Ka Sikandar (using a scene with actress Rekha), with her design slightly changed later on in production.

=== Williams's loss of control of the film (1992) ===
The film was not finished by a 1991 deadline that Warner Bros. originally imposed upon Williams, and had approximately 10 to 15 minutes of screen time to complete, which, at Williams's rate, was estimated to take "a tight six months" or longer. The animation department at Warner Bros. had put their enthusiasm towards high-quality television animation, but had little confidence towards backing feature animation. The studio had already released The Nutcracker Prince, a Canadian-produced animated feature, in 1990 to almost no promotion. Jean MacCurdy, Warner Bros.' then-head of animation, did not know anything about animation, as she admitted to an artist who had worked for Williams while she was seeing footage of The Thief. Another animator salvaged almost 40 minutes of 35 mm dailies footage from MacCurdy's trash. Meanwhile, Walt Disney Feature Animation had begun work on Aladdin, a film that bore striking resemblances in story, style and character to The Thief and the Cobbler; for example, the character Zigzag from Thief shares many physical characteristics with both Aladdin's villain Jafar, and its Genie, as animated by Williams Studio alumnus Andreas Deja and Eric Goldberg.

The Completion Bond Company asked television animation producer Fred Calvert to report on the state of production in detail. Calvert had made multiple trips to Williams's London studio to see how the film was progressing, and judged that Williams was "woefully behind schedule and way over budget". Williams had a script, but "he wasn't following it faithfully". According to Garrett Gilchrist, however, this anecdote is false. Calvert and people from the Completion Bond Company were visiting the studio more often towards the end of production. Williams was giving dailies of sequences that were finished or scrapped since the 1980s, hoping to give an indication of progress to Warner Bros. He was asked to show the investors a rough copy of the film with the remaining scenes filled in with storyboards to demonstrate its narrative. He made a workprint which combined finished footage, pencil tests, storyboards, and movements from the symphonic suite Scheherazade to cover the 10–15 minutes left to finish. Animators found out that they had completed more than enough footage for an 87-minute feature, but they had yet to finish certain vital sequences involving the central story.

On 13 May 1992, this rough version of the film was shown to Warner Bros., and was not well-received. During the screening, the penultimate reel of the film was missing, which did not help matters. The studio lost confidence and backed out of production entirely, and the Completion Bond Company seized control of the film, ousting Williams from the project. Additionally, Williams said that the production had lost a source of funding when Japanese investors pulled out due to the recession following the Japanese asset price bubble. Fans have cited this decision as an example of a trend of animated films being tampered with by studio executives.

=== Production under Fred Calvert and Initial releases (1992–1994) ===
Sue Shakespeare of Creative Capers Entertainment had previously offered to solve story problems with Richard Williams, suggested bringing in Terry Gilliam to consult, and proposed to allow Williams to finish the film under her supervision. Williams reportedly agreed to Shakespeare's proposal, but her bid was ultimately rejected by the Completion Bond Company in favor of a cheaper one by Fred Calvert, whom the company had assigned to finish the film as cheaply and quickly as possible. Calvert was discontented, feeling that he'll be unable to finish the film the way Williams intended, saying: "I really didn't want to do it, but if I didn't do it, it would have been given off to the lowest bidder. I took it as a way to try and preserve something and at least get the thing on the screen and let it be seen".

It took Calvert around a year and a half to finish the film, which was turned into a Disney-type musical. The new scenes were photographed "on twos" rather than "on ones", with the animation being produced by freelance animators in Los Angeles and former Williams animators working with Neil Boyle at Premier Films in London. Sullivan Bluth Studios, the Dublin-based studio headed by former Disney animator Don Bluth, animated the first song sequence "She Is More", and Kroyer Films produced the second number "Am I Feeling Love?". The animation was subcontracted to Wang Film Productions in Taiwan and its division Thai Wang Film Productions in Thailand, as well as Pacific Rim Animation in China and Varga Studio in Hungary. Robert Folk was brought on to compose a new score replacing the score from the workprint, with the lone exception being Night on Bald Mountain when the Thief prepares to try and fly to the ruby. With the exception of Vincent Price, most of the main voice cast were replaced, with the addition of Tack now being given a speaking role by actor Steve Lively.

Approximately 18 minutes of completed animation were cut by Calvert due to the scenes' repetitiveness. Calvert said: "We hated to see all this beautiful animation hit the cutting room floor, but that was the only way we could make a story out of it. He [Williams] was kind of Rube Goldberg-ing his way through. I don't think he was able to step back and look at the whole thing as a story. He's an incredible animator, though. Incredible. One of the biggest problems we had was trying our desperate best, where we had brand new footage, to come up to the level of quality that he had set". Several unused scenes involving the Thief would instead be used in the background for the credits.

After the film was completed, Allied Filmmakers, along with Majestic Films, reacquired the distribution rights from the Completion Bond Company. Calvert's version of the film was distributed in South Africa and in Australia as The Princess and the Cobbler on 23 September 1993. The film was later released in the Philippines as The Thief and the Cobbler by Jemah Films on 23 April 1994.

=== Further changes under Miramax (1994–1995) ===
In December 1994, the North American rights to the film were bought by Miramax Films, then a subsidiary of Disney (which had already released Aladdin first), after it had already been rejected by several other American distributors. Calvert recalls: "It was a very difficult film to market, it had such a reputation, that I don't think they were looking at it objectively". Instead of releasing Calvert's cut as it was, Miramax decided to change the film even further and released their version entitled Arabian Knight.

This version was cut by 8 minutes, featured newly written dialogue by Eric Gilliland, Michael Hitchcock and Gary Glasberg, along with the addition of celebrity actors Matthew Broderick, Jennifer Beals, Toni Collette, Eric Bogosian, and Jonathan Winters, and added dialogue to various characters who didn't speak in either the workprint or The Princess and the Cobbler, such as the Thief and Phido, save for some squawks for the latter originally voiced by Donald Pleasence, had a much more extensive use of stock sound effects, as well as adding new musical cues by Jack Maeby. Jake Eberts found that "It was significantly enhanced and changed by Miramax after Miramax stepped in and acquired the domestic [distribution] rights." His comments on record, claiming that these altered versions were superior to Williams's version, indicated that Eberts had also lost confidence in Williams when the Completion Bond Company seized the film. Some of the characters, including Mighty One-Eye (now named King One-Eye)'s slave women and most scenes with the Mad and Holy Old Witch (her human form in particular), are largely dropped from this release, as well as removing One-Eye's death in question, though his final line from the Calvert version ("My machine!") is still used as the war machine burns up. Another notable alteration to the story is the Witch now being King One-Eye's sister and the bearer of his other eye.

Arabian Knight was quietly released by Miramax on 25 August 1995. It opened on 510 screens, and grossed US$319,723 (on an estimated budget of $24 million) during its theatrical run.

== Home media ==
The Allied Filmmakers version of the film was released on VHS in Australia by Columbia TriStar Home Video in 1994.

The Miramax version was set to be released by Miramax Home Entertainment on VHS in December 1995, five months after its theatrical release, but was eventually released on 18 February 1997, under its original title The Thief and the Cobbler. A widescreen LaserDisc was also released. The Miramax version of the film appeared on a DVD as a giveaway promotion in packages of Froot Loops cereal. In 2001, this pan and scan DVD was released through Canadian studio Alliance Atlantis, which, at the time, distributed many of Miramax's films in Canada. It came in a paper sleeve and had no special features, other than the choice of English or French-language tracks. The Miramax version was first released on DVD in Japan by the Daiichi Kosho Company in 2002, using a widescreen copy of Miramax's Arabian Knight version with English and Japanese-language tracks. The Allied Filmmakers version was released on a pan and scan DVD in Australia in 2003 by Magna Pacific, but it is severely cropped, and there are no additional features on the DVD.

A commercially released North American DVD of the Miramax version was released by Miramax Family on 8 March 2005. This was basically the same as the Froot Loops cereal DVD, albeit with a new menu design and the addition of trailers for My Scene Goes Hollywood: The Movie and Pokémon: Destiny Deoxys. This DVD was re-released by The Weinstein Company Home Entertainment on 21 November 2006. Although the information supplied to online retailers said that it would be a new special edition, it was in fact only a reissue of Miramax's earlier DVD with revised packaging and a new set of trailers. The 2006 DVD was found by most reviewers to be unsatisfactory, with the only extra features being trailers for other Weinstein Company family films. The Digital Bits listed it as the worst standard-edition DVD of 2006. The Miramax/Weinstein DVD was re-issued again on 3 May 2011 by Echo Bridge Home Entertainment, an independent DVD distributor who made a deal to release 251 titles from the Miramax library until the deal expired in 2014. These releases are now out of print as further scheduling of the Region 1 release has yet to commence as of 2024.

Lionsgate released the Miramax version on DVD in the United Kingdom on 13 February 2012. The film had previously never been released in any form there.

== Music ==
During production under Allied Filmmakers, four musical numbers were added: "She Is More", "Am I Feeling Love?", "Bom Bom Bom Beem Bom", and "It's So Amazing". These songs are only present in both the Princess and the Cobbler and Arabian Knight versions of the film.

All lyrics are written by Norman Gimbel, while the music is composed by Robert Folk.

The pop version of "Am I Feeling Love?" was performed by Arnold McCuller and Andrea Robinson.

No.	Title	Performer(s)	Length
1.	"She Is More"	Bobbi Page	2:29
2.	"Am I Feeling Love?"	Bobbi Page & Steve Lively	2:13
3.	"Bom Bom Bom Beem Bom (That's What Happens When You Don't Go to School)"	The Brigands (Randy Crenshaw, Kevin Dorsey, Roger Freeland, Nick Jameson, Bob Joyce, Jon Joyce, Kerry Katz, Ted King, Michael Lanning, Raymond McLeod, Rick Charles Nelson, & Scott Rummell)	2:19
4.	"It's So Amazing"	Steve Lively & Bobbi Page	2:42
5.	"Am I Feeling Love? (Pop Version)"	Andrea Robinson & Arnold McCuller	3:30

- Note: The pop version of "Am I Feeling Love?" was not included on the soundtrack release of the Miramax version. The song "It's So Amazing" was also moved to the end credits in the Miramax version and is performed by Arnold McCuller and Andrea Robinson on the soundtrack as well.

== Reception ==
The Miramax version of the film was a commercial failure and received mixed reviews. Rotten Tomatoes gives the film a score of 60% based on 10 reviews, with an average rating of 6.6/10. Caryn James of The New York Times criticised the songs sung by the princess, calling the lyrics "horrible" and the melodies "forgettable", although he did praise Williams's animation as "among the most glorious and lively ever created". Animation historian Jerry Beck felt that the added voiceovers of Jonathan Winters and Matthew Broderick were unnecessary and unfunny, and that Fred Calvert's new footage did not meet the standards of Williams's original scenes. The Miramax version of the film was often unfavorably compared to Aladdin, with some even calling it a rip-off of the film. However, in 2003, the Online Film Critics Society named the film the 81st greatest animated film of all time. In addition, the film won the 1995 Academy of Family Films Award.

The Calvert cut received a review in a 1997 Animato! issue by Andrew Osmond, who thought it tough to assess. He held it as far from the masterpiece it was hyped to be in its present state, and believed it would have likely not been one either had Williams finished it. He found the narrative lackluster, with thin but entertaining characters, and dismissed the musical numbers as "listenable pap" save for the "rather good fun" brigand song, but nonetheless described it as "a very funny film" and was impressed by the animation as "physics, perspective, shape and form all bend to the draughtsman's will".

Alex Williams, the son of the original director who also worked on the film before it was re-edited, criticised changes made by Calvert and Miramax, called the finished film "more or less unwatchable" and found it "hard to find the spirit of the film as it was originally conceived". For years, Richard Williams was devastated by the film's production and had never publicly discussed it since then. In 2010, however, he discussed the film during an interview about his silent animated short Circus Drawings, a project he shelved in the 1960s before he started work on The Thief. He later participated in Q&As for screenings of his 1992 workprint at the Samuel Goldwyn Theater on 10 December 2013 and at the BFI Southbank in London on 1 June 2014. Williams also said he had never seen the Calvert or Miramax versions of the film: "I'm not interested, but my son, who is also an animator, did tell me that if I ever want to jump off a bridge, then I should take a look".

== Legacy ==
=== Influence ===
The Secret of Kells, Song of the Sea and Wolfwalkers, three Irish animated films that based their style on traditional native art, had The Thief and the Cobbler cited as one of their main inspirations. Tomm Moore, the director of all three films, said: "Some friends in college and I were inspired by Richard Williams's unfinished masterpiece The Thief and the Cobbler and the Disney movie Mulan, which took indigenous traditional art as the starting point for a beautiful style of 2D animation. I felt that something similar could be done with Irish art".

=== Restoration attempts ===
Richard Williams's workprint was bootlegged after Calvert's versions were released, and copies have been shared among animation fans and professionals for years. The problem in creating a high-quality restoration is that after the Completion Bond Company had finished the film, many scenes by Williams that were removed disappeared—many of these had fallen into the hands of private parties. Before losing control of the film, Williams had originally kept all artwork safe in a fireproof basement. Additionally, there are legal problems with Miramax.

At the 2000 Annecy Festival, Williams showed Walt Disney Feature Animation head Roy E. Disney his workprint of The Thief, which Roy liked. With Williams's support, Roy Disney began a project to restore The Thief and the Cobbler, seeking original pencil tests and completed footage. However, due to the lackluster reception of most hand-drawn animated films released during the early 2000s, as well as his tough relationship with then-Disney CEO Michael Eisner, Roy left the Walt Disney Company in November 2003, and the project was put on hold. Disney film producer Don Hahn was later made the project supervisor of the restoration, but after Roy's death in 2009, the project was officially called off.

==== The Recobbled Cut ====
In 2006, filmmaker and artist Garrett Gilchrist created a non-profit fan restoration of Williams's workprint, titled The Thief and the Cobbler: The Recobbled Cut. It was done in as high quality as possible by combining available sources at the time, including a video copy of Williams's workprint and a Japanese DVD release of Arabian Knight. This edit was much supported by numerous people who had worked on the film (except Richard Williams himself), including Roy Naisbitt, Alex Williams, Andreas Wessel-Therhorn, Tony White, Holger Leihe, Simon Maddocks, Neil Boyle, and Steve Evangelatos, many of whom lent rare material for the project. Some minor changes were made to "make it feel more like a finished film", like adding more music and using scenes from the Princess and the Cobbler version of the film. Some scenes (like the wedding ending) had to be retouched frame by frame by Gilchrist due to flaws in the footage. Gilchrist described this as the most complex independent restoration of a film ever undertaken. This edit gained positive reviews on the Internet. Twitch Film called it "the best and most important 'fan edit' ever made". Nell Minow of Common Sense Media gave the film full five stars, saying that it was "a must for family viewing."

The Recobbled Cut has been revised four times, in 2006, 2008, 2013 and 2023. Each version incorporated further, higher-quality materials donated by animators from the films. The "Mark 3" version released in 2008 incorporated 21 minutes from a 49-minute reel of rare 35 mm film. Gilchrist's "Mark 4" was released in September 2013 and edited in HD. "Mark 4" features about 30 minutes of the film in full HD quality, restored from raw 35 mm footage which Gilchrist edited frame by frame to remove dirt and damage. Artists were also commissioned to contribute new artwork and material. In February 2023, Gilchrist invited professional animators to come on board for another revision for the 10th anniversary of "Mark 4" (as well as roughly the 60th anniversary of the film beginning production, and the 30th anniversary of the film ending production). New animation was created for this version, and many scenes were partly redrawn or recolored by Gilchrist. An early version of the "Recobbled Cut Mark 5" premiered on YouTube on June 21, 2023. Gilchrist's YouTube account, "TheThiefArchive", serves as a public video archive of Richard Williams's films, titles, commercials, and interviews, including footage from the Nasrudin production. Williams said that while he never saw Gilchrist's Recobbled Cut, he acknowledged the role that the edits had played in rehabilitating the film's reputation.

=== Academy preservation ===
Williams stated that his unfinished version, from 13 May 1992, is now archived and digitally duplicated by the Academy of Motion Picture Arts and Sciences: "The Academy has it, it's in a 'golden box' now and it's safe". The unfinished version, along with a selection of Art Babbitt's animation from the film, has been placed in an archive collection named "The Art Babbitt Collection". A collection of artwork from The Thief is also stored in Disney's "Animation Research Library" in the Feature Animation building.

The unfinished version was screened at the Academy's Samuel Goldwyn Theater under the title The Thief and the Cobbler: A Moment in Time, on 10 December 2013, with Williams in attendance. Also attending the screening were other notable filmmakers, animators, composers, critics, actors, and directors like Eric Goldberg, Chris Wedge, June Foray, Alan Menken, David Silverman, Phil Roman, Art Leonardi, Tom Sito, Mark Kausler, John Musker, Ron Clements, Theodore Thomas, Charles Solomon, Bob Kurtz, Martha Sigall, Kevin Kurytnik, Carol Beecher, Jerry Beck, Yvette Kaplan, Carl Bell, Andreas Wessel-Therhorn, Kevin Schreck, and Garrett Gilchrist. After the screening Williams discussed the origins of the film and its production history. On 1 June 2014, "A Moment in Time" was screened in London under the British Film Institute, with many of the original crew present. On 25 November 2018, during another screening in London, Williams suggested the possibility of a Blu-ray release with the BFI. Williams said the European rights to The Thief were still available in order to release it, but the North American rights he felt were currently too complicated to also release the Blu-ray there. Williams died shortly after on 17 August 2019 at the age of 86, without ever seeing a finished version of The Thief and the Cobbler as he had originally envisioned. In 27 November 2026, "A Moment in Time" will be screened at TIFF Lightbox as part of Masaaki Yuasa's "Drawn Universes: Visions in Animation" program.

=== Documentary ===
Persistence of Vision is a documentary by Kevin Schreck, about Richard Williams and the production of The Thief and the Cobbler, which the film calls "the greatest animated film never made". Because Williams did not participate in the documentary, it is instead a documentary from the perspective of animators and artists who had worked with Richard Williams and his studio during the film's lengthy production. Williams is featured in the documentary, through archival interviews. Garrett Gilchrist and Helge Bernhardt of the Recobbled Cut and Richard Williams Archive provided rare materials to Schreck for his production, which was funded via Kickstarter.

First premiered in 2012 at the Vancouver International Film Festival, it has received many awards at festivals and received very positive critical reception. Williams was given a copy of the film before he died, but said he "[didn't] plan on watching it".

== See also ==
- Lists of animated feature films
- History of British animation
- List of films with longest production time

=== Other animated films with long production histories ===
- The Overcoat, an unfinished Russian animated film, in production since 1981.
- The King and the Mockingbird, a French animated film, produced in two parts (1948–1952, 1967–1980), initially released in recut form, but eventually finished as per director's wishes.
- The Tragedy of Man, a Hungarian animated film, began production in 1988 and premiered in 2011.
- Hoffmaniada, a Russian stop-motion animated film, began production in 1991 and premiered in 2018.
- Mad God, an American stop-motion animated film, initially produced circa 1990–1992, continued production in 2012 and premiered in 2021.

== Works cited ==
As of this edit, this article uses content from "The Thief and the Cobbler", which is licensed in a way that permits reuse under the Creative Commons Attribution-ShareAlike 3.0 Unported License, but not under the GFDL. All relevant terms must be followed.
