= Harrod Blank =

American documentary filmmaker

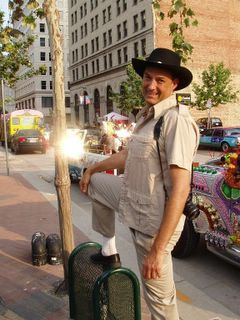
Harrod Blank, Houston 2005

Harrod Blank (born 1963 in Westminster, California, United States) is an American documentary filmmaker and art car artist living in Berkeley, California. He is the son of Gail, a ceramic artist, and filmmaker Les Blank. His works include the 1992 film Wild Wheels, which documents the artcar phenomenon in America, and the 1998 follow-up Driving The Dream, which focuses on the artists behind the cars. His films have been shown on PBS, TBS, and in cities all over the USA. Harrod has created three art cars of his own: Oh My God!, Pico de Gallo and The Camera Van.

Blank is also the co-founder (along with Philo Northrup) of one of the largest annual art car gatherings in the country - the Art Car Fest, held every September in the San Francisco Bay Area. He is largely responsible for the organization of an art car theme camp at the annual Burning Man festival and is working on a documentary about the event. Blank is currently renovating a building complex in Douglas, Arizona, United States, to become a museum and learning center for art cars; the name of the center will be "Artcar World".

== Significant achievements ==
Harrod Blank is one of the people responsible for bringing the art car and the art car community, along with outsider and visionary artcar artists, out of Houston, TX, California and the West and into the living rooms of much of mainstream America.

After being picked up by PBS and TBS, Blank's art car movies were widely aired. At the same time he applied his photographic skills and energy to place art cars on the pages of many newspapers and magazines around the world. This presentation of the art car community to the world resulted in requests for art cars to be placed on exhibit in museums throughout the United States and in Europe. Harrod addressed this demand with his "Art Car Agency", which consists of a number of prominent artcar artists willing to lend out their vehicles for exhibit. Art cars are now accessible up close and personal in many more areas.

Through his promotion of Houston's Orange Show art car events including the parade, art car seminars and the Main Street Drag (an event which brings art cars to schools) Harrod helped to bring art cars into the world of education where they became the focus of hands-on workshops in schools across the country. Public appearances and lectures at museums and art car events helped Blank to use his personal experience to keep the art car phenomenon moving forward. Soon communities of art car artists sprung up in many eastern states and throughout the country. Some of these communities then partnered with local organizations such as schools, arts councils, and museums to create their own art car events mirroring those held in Houston. Through Blank's work artcars started appearing in television commercials and as "drive ons" in movies much more often than the past. Harrod continues to be active in the art car community. He takes a personal interest and often appears at parades and events.

== Bibliography ==
Books and Film

- Blank, Harrod,
  - 1987, "In The Land Of The Owl Turds." 31 minute narrative student thesis film while at UC Santa Cruz,
  - 1992, "Wild Wheels.", Starring: Casey Kasem, Darrell Staley Director: Harrod Blank, (DVD - Dec 17, 2005)
  - 1993,"Wild Wheels." Pomegranate Communications, Inc. Rohnert Park, CA,(2nd Edition: Blank Books; November 15, 2001)
  - 1998, "Driving The Dream, 29:00, made for National Geographic Television, broadcast October 1997 (VHS released 1998)
  - 2002, "Art Cars: The Cars, the Artists, the Obsession, the Craft." (Paperback), Lark Books; 1st edition (May 28, 2002)
  - 2007, "Art Cars: The Cars, the Artists, the Obsession, the Craft." (Paperback), Blank Books; 2nd edition (April, 2007)
  - 2008, "Automorphosis" 76:38 released Jan 23, 2009 at Santa Barbara International Film Festival, (DVD Dec 17, 2010)
- Gale Reference Team, Thomson Gale 2006, April 26 "Biography - Blank, Harrod (1963-)": From: Contemporary Authors [HTML] (Digital)

Periodicals

- McCray, Nancy. review of Wild Wheels video, Booklist, September 1, 1994, p. 62.
- Rebecca, Miller. review of Art Cars: The Cars, the Artists, the Obsession, the Craft, Library Journal, April 1, 2002, p. 99.
- Grimes, William. "No, It's Not a Mad Vision. It's an Art Car. Want a Ride?", New York Times, August 21, 1992, p. B3(N),
- Grimes, William. "A Total of 1, 705 Candid Cameras", New York Times, August 26, 1995, p. 37.
- Min, Janice, "Auto Auteur: Harrod Blank Films Vehicular Fantasies", People, April 18, 1994, pp. 57–58.
- Staff writer, Publishers Weekly. "You Auto See This One!", Publishers Weekly, January 28, 2002, p. 247.
- Brooks, Burton H. review of Wild Wheels (video), School Library Journal, December 1994, p. 61.
- Holstrom, David. "Honk If You Love 'Art Cars'; Harrod Blank Was So Taken By The Reactions Of People, To His Edition", Christian Science Monitor. Boston, Mass., Feb 26, 1997. pg. 1
- Richard, Paul. "When the Muse Goes Into Overdrive; The `Wild Wheels' Filmmaker and Cars That Wax Poetic" [FINAL Edition], The Washington Post, Washington, D.C.: Aug 22, 1992. pg. d.01
- Howe, Desson. "Body Shop of Bizarre", The Washington Post, Washington, D.C.: Aug 21, 1992. p. WW38
