= Jed Riffe =

- Born: Dallas, Texas, U.S.
- Education: El Centro College
- Occupation: Filmmaker

Jed Riffe is an American filmmaker. For over 30 years his documentary films have focused on social issues and politics including: Native American histories and struggles (Ishi, the Last Yahi, California's "Lost" Tribes, Who Owns the Past?,) and agriculture, food and sustainability issues (Ripe for Change). He lives and works in the San Francisco Bay Area.

== Biography ==
Riffe was born in Dallas, Texas, and attended El Centro College in Dallas, where he studied journalism. In 1968, he published The Good Life magazine and soon became politically involved in the civil rights and anti-war movements in Texas. He organized demonstrations as part of the national Vietnam Moratorium Committee campaign, and was hired as the Texas organizer for Clergy and Laymen Concerned about Vietnam. His activism inspired his interest in filmmaking.

Riffe's best known film, Ishi, the Last Yahi was released theatrically and aired on the PBS series The American Experience. The film went on to win "Best Documentary" awards at eight film festivals and was nominated for a national Emmy award in 1994.

Riffe served as series and executive producer on California and the American Dream, an independently produced national series that aired on PBS.

Riffe's other credits include interactive producer and video director of the first Africana Interactive Studies Center at Merritt College; interactive producer/writer for four interactive exhibits for the Autry Museum of American History; interactive producer and writer for Public Broadcasting In Public Places. Riffe and his team designed, programmed, built and installed four interactive media kiosks with 160 minutes of content from the California and the American Dream series. Riffe wrote, produced and directed TV of Tomorrow, an interactive prototype demonstrating the possible ways interactive content might appear on television in the future. In 1990, Riffe produced 86 minutes of video for three interactive History Information Stations, at the Oakland Museum of California.

Riffe also consults on film and video distribution.

== Filmography ==
- A Dangerous Idea: Eugenics, Genetics and the American Dream (producer) 2018
- The Long Shadow (co-producer) 2017
- Andre: The Voice of Wine (producer) 2017
- A New Color (executive producer) 2016
- In the Name of the Gene (producer) 2016
- Shut Up, Sit Down and Listen (producer) 2011
- To Chris Marker, an Unsent Letter (executive producer) 2012
- Heist: Who Stole the American Dream? (consulting producer) 2011
- Smokin' Fish (executive producer) 2010
- Convention (line producer) 2008
- California and the American Dream (series producer) 2006
- California's "Lost" Tribes (producer, director, co-writer) 2006
- The New Los Angeles (executive producer) 2006
- The Price of Renewal (executive producer) 2006
- Ripe for Change (producer) 2006
- Waiting to Inhale (producer, director) 2006
- Ruthie and Connie: Every Room in the House (consulting producer) 2002
- Who Owns the Past? (producer, director) 2000
- Ishi, the Last Yahi (producer, director) 1992
- Rosebud to Dallas (producer, director, co-writer) 1977
- Promise and Practice (producer, director, co-writer) 1975

== Awards and recognition ==
- California's "Lost" Tribes: 2001 Gerbode Fellow for Excellence in Non-Profit Management
- Ishi, the Last Yahi: "Special Awards: for Writing, Directing and Editing", Association of Visual Communicators
