= Eh, La Bas =

Traditional New Orleans song

- New Orleans folk music
- Language: Cajun, French, English

Eh La Bas is a traditional New Orleans song. Originally it was sung with Creole lyrics but was later given French lyrics and the common title from the French lyrics. There have been numerous versions, including English lyrics that refer to both the Cajun and French versions, and all employ a call and response.

== Lyrics ==
Original Louisiana Creole lyrics and English translation:

| E la ba! (E la ba!) | Hey over there! Hey over there! |
| E la ba! (E la ba!) | Hey over there! Hey over there! |
| E la ba, chèri! (E la ba, chèri!) | Hey over there, dear lady! (Hey over there, dear lady!) |
| Komon sa va? (Komon sa va?) | How's it goin'? |
| Mo chè kouzen, mo chè kouzin, | My dear cousin (male), my dear cousin (female), |
| mo lenme la kizin! | I love the kitchen! |
| Mo manje plen, mo bwa diven, | I eat a lot, I drink wine, |
| e sa pa kout ariyen. | and it costs me nothing. |
| Ye tchwe kochon, ye tchwe lapen, | They kill a pig, they kill a rabbit, |
| e mo manje plen. | and I eat a lot. |
| Ye fe gonmbo, mo manje tro, | They make gumbo, I eat too much, |
| e sa fe mon malad. | and that makes me sick |

French lyrics and English translation:

| Eh la bas (Eh la bas) | Hey over there |
| Eh la bas (Eh la bas) | Hey over there |
| Eh la bas cherie (Eh la bas cherie) | Hey over there friend |
| Comment ça va (Comment ça va) | How are you |
| Mon cher cousin, ma chère cousine | My dear cousin (male), my dear cousin (female) |
| J’aime la cuisine, | I like the kitchen (cooking) |
| Je mange beaucoup, je bois du vin | I eat a lot, I drink wine |
| Et ça ne me coûte rien | And it costs me nothing |
| Je tue un cochon, je tue un lapin | I kill a pig, I kill a rabbit |
| Et je mange beaucoup | And I eat a lot |
| Je fais du gumbo, je mange trop | I make gumbo, I eat too much |
| Et ça me rend malade. | And that makes me sick |
| L’autre jour j’ai mangé trop | The other day I ate a lot |
| Court-bouillon poisson | Court-boillon fish (fish cooked in wine) |
| Mon conte a vous allant vomis | My story to you goes vomit |
| Vomis, comme un cochon. | Vomit like a pig |

== English lyrics ==
English lyrics by Louis Brown and Bob Stevens:

Eh la bas (Eh la bas)
Eh la bas (Eh la bas)
Eh la bas (Eh la bas)
Eh la bas (Eh la bas)
Tra-la-la (Tra-la-la)
Sis-Boom-Bah (Sis-Boom-Bah)
Eh la bas (Eh la bas)
Eh la bas (Eh la bas)

Well, I can't speak French, not in a pinch, so I don't know what it means.
But it sounds real good, like I know it would, like down in New Orleans.
I love to hear that clarinet burn, and hear them trambone [sic] glisses,
I'd like to sing French when I take my turn, but that ain't the kinda' band that this is!

Kid Ory sang that Cajun French in a fine ol' Creole way,
but the only Cajun I can say is "Laissez les bons temps rouler!"
So let the good times roll my friends, and let the music play,
Tomorrow may never come to be, so let's live it up today!

== Versions ==
As a traditional song it has no copyright and its origins are uncertain. It has been widely recorded by New Orleans bands since the 1940s:

- The Creole Stompers — 1944
- Kid Ory's Creole Jazz Band — 1946
- Paul Barbarin — 1955
- Chris Barber's Jazz Band with Billie and De De Pierce in Preservation Hall, New Orleans — 1959
- The Original Tuxedo Jass Band — 1964
- Moise and Alida Viator with Eh, La-Bas! - 2003
- Preservation Hall Jazz Band

== See also ==
- Music of New Orleans
