= In Heaven There Is No Beer? =

- Directed by: Les Blank
- Produced by: Les Blank
- Cinematography: Les Blank
- Edited by: Maureen Gosling
- Distributed by: Flower Films
- Release date: May 23, 1984
- Running time: 51 minutes
- Country: U.S.A.
- Language: English

In Heaven There Is No Beer? is a 1984 American documentary film by Les Blank about the life, culture and food surrounding devotees of polkas.

== Accolades ==
It won a special jury award at the 1985 Sundance Film Festival, as well as the Grand Prix at the 1985 Melbourne International Film Festival.

== Home media ==
It was released on DVD and Blu-ray via The Criterion Collection as part of the Always for Pleasure set.

== See also ==
- Polka in the United States
