= Les Blank =

American documentary filmmaker

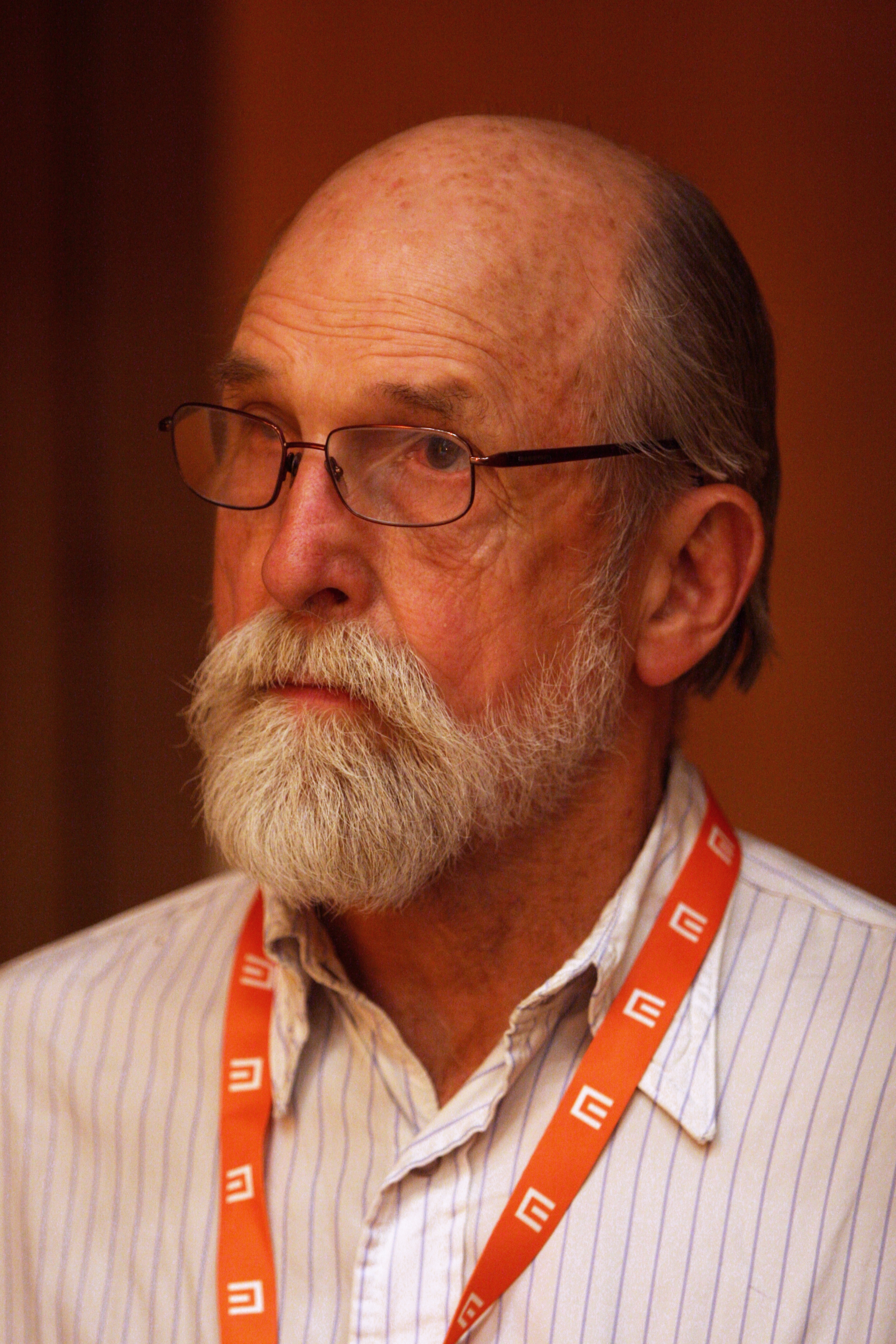
- Blank at 43rd KVIFF in 2008
- Born: Leslie Harrod Blank Jr. November 27, 1935; Tampa, Florida
- Died: April 7, 2013 (aged 77); Berkeley Hills, California
- Education: Tulane University; University of Southern California
- Occupation: Documentary filmmaker
- Years active: 1965-2013

Les Blank (November 27, 1935 – April 7, 2013) was an American documentary filmmaker best known for his portraits of American traditional musicians.

== Life and career ==
Leslie Harrod Blank Jr. was born November 27, 1935, in Tampa, Florida. He attended Phillips Academy, and Tulane University in New Orleans, where he received a B.A. degree in English. He also briefly attended University of California, Berkeley. In the early 1960s, Blank studied filmmaking at the University of Southern California and received his master's degree.

Following his university education, he worked for a production company called Operation Success, making films that he would later describe as "insipid films that promote business and industry." In 1967 he founded his own production company, Flower Films, with the release of God Respects Us When We Work, but Loves Us When We Dance, a short colorful document of Los Angeles' Elysian Park Love-in. During Mardi Gras in late February 1968, Blank, Barry Feinstein and others were in New Orleans as part of the original “underground filmmakers” crew of Easy Rider which produced the acid trip segment of that movie, but was replaced afterwards by a more experienced crew. This was followed by The Blues Accordin' to Lightnin' Hopkins (1968) and The Sun's Gonna Shine (1968) about Houston blues musician Lightnin' Hopkins. He never went back to work making industrial films and all of his films were independently produced, often with the assistance of grants from cultural agencies, both governmental and non-governmental.

Most of his films focused on American traditional music forms, including (among others) blues, Appalachian, Cajun, Creole, Tex-Mex, polka, tamburitza, and Hawaiian music. Many of these films represent the only filmed documents of musicians who are now deceased.

Blank's films focusing on musical subjects often spent much of their running time focusing not on the music itself but on the music's cultural context, portraying the surroundings from which these American roots musics come.

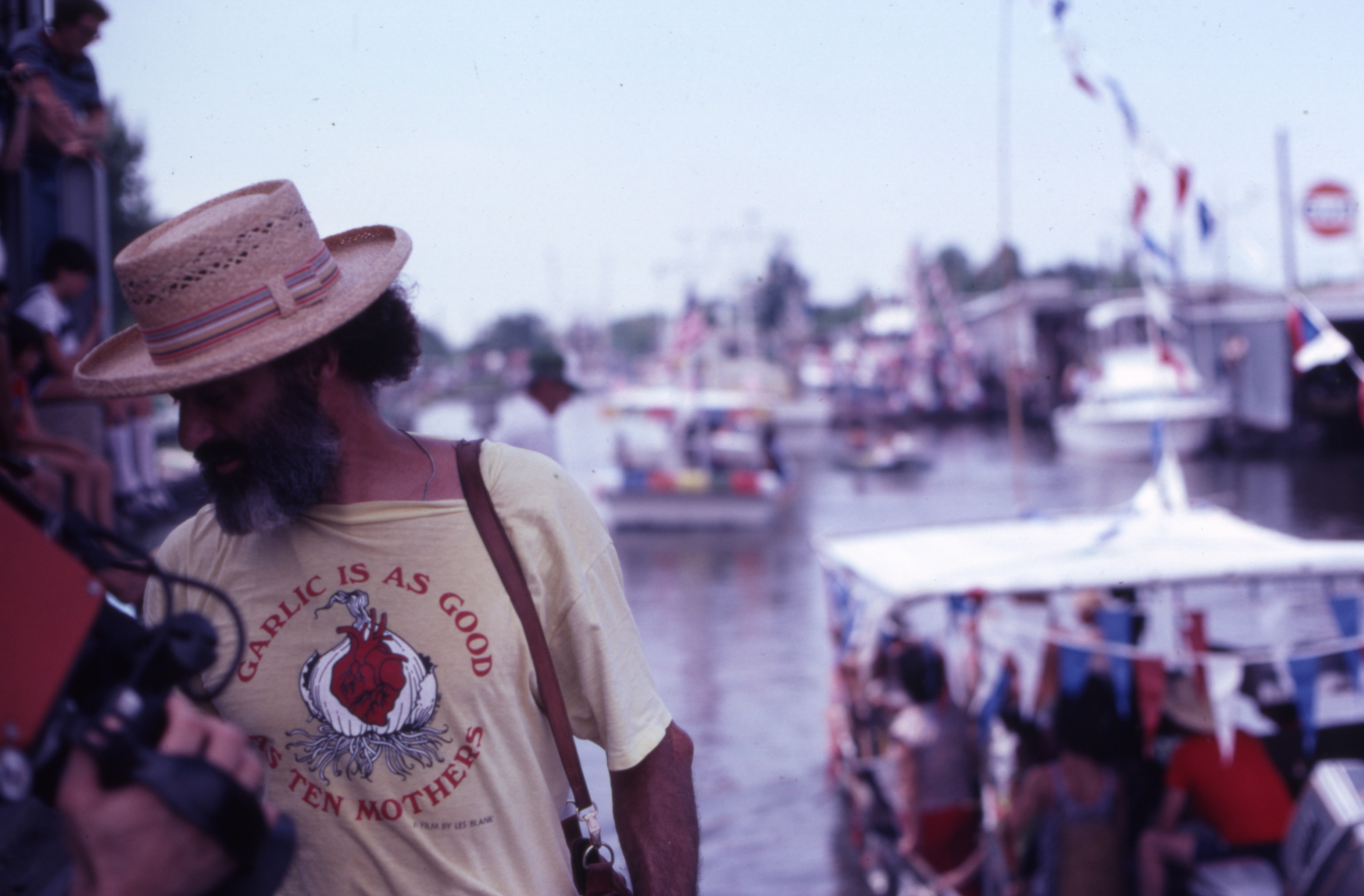
Blank in Delacroix, Louisiana, in 1981

Other notable films on non-musical subjects include a film about garlic and another about gap-toothed women, as well as two films about German film director Werner Herzog: Werner Herzog Eats His Shoe (1980) and Burden of Dreams (1982), the latter about the filming of Herzog's Fitzcarraldo. The Maestro: King of the Cowboy Artists (1994) and Sworn to the Drum: A Tribute to Francisco Aguabella (1995) were Blank's last two films using 16mm film. He later worked in digital video. One of his last films, All in This Tea, which was co-directed with his creative partner Gina Leibrecht, was a profile of the western Marin County-based tea importer and adventurer David Lee Hoffman. In 2014, his last film How to Smell a Rose: A Visit with Ricky Leacock in Normandy was completed shortly after his death by Gina Leibrecht, and was a portrait of the co-founder of Direct Cinema, Richard Leacock. In 2007 Blank was awarded the prestigious Edward MacDowell Medal in the Arts.

Les's son, Harrod Blank, has also become a documentary filmmaker.

Blank lived in the Berkeley Hills and for more than 30 years he was a resident of Berkeley, which celebrated Les Blank Day on Jan 22, 2013. His company, Flower Films, was based in El Cerrito, Contra Costa County, California.

Blank died of bladder cancer at his Berkeley Hills home on April 7, 2013. The nonprofit Les Blank Films continues to release Blank's work.

== Legacy ==
Blank was the first documentary filmmaker to earn the Edward MacDowell Medal in 2007, a national honor given to one artist a year. He was awarded in 1990 the American Film Institute's Maya Deren Award for outstanding lifetime achievement as an independent filmmaker. In 2011, the International Documentary Association honored Blank with a career achievement award.

Two months prior to Blank's death, the Hot Docs Canadian International Documentary Festival announced that Blank had been accepted to receive its 2013 Outstanding Achievement Award along with a retrospective of his work at the festival, which took place from April 25 to May 5, 2013.

== Archive ==
The moving image collection of Les Blank is held at the Academy Film Archive. The Academy Film Archive has preserved numerous Les Blank films including A Well Spent Life, Always for Pleasure, and Werner Herzog Eats His Shoe.

== Filmography ==
- 1960 - Running Around Like a Chicken With Its Head Cut Off
- 1960–1985 - Six Short Films of Les Blank
- 1961, - Strike!
- 1962 - And Freedom Came?!
- 1965 - Dizzy Gillespie
- 1967 - Christopher Tree
- 1967 - Thailand Moment
- 1968 - The Blues Accordin' to Lightnin' Hopkins
- 1968 - God Respects Us When We Work, But Loves Us When We Dance
- 1969 - The Arch
- 1969 - The Sun's Gonna Shine
- 1970 - Chicken Real
- 1971 - Spend It All
- 1971 - A Well Spent Life
- 1973 - Dry Wood
- 1973 - Hot Pepper
- 1974 - A Poem Is a Naked Person
- 1976 - Chulas Fronteras≠
- 1978 - More Fess
- 1978 - Always for Pleasure
- 1979 - Del Mero Corazon
- 1980 - Poto and Cabengo (cinematographer)
- 1980 - Werner Herzog Eats His Shoe
- 1980 - Garlic Is as Good as Ten Mothers≠
- 1982 - Burden of Dreams
- 1983 - Sprout Wings and Fly
- 1984 - In Heaven There Is No Beer?
- 1985 - Battle of the Guitars
- 1985 - Cigarette Blues
- 1986 - Huey Lewis and the News: Be-Fore!
- 1987 - Gap-Toothed Women
- 1987 - Ziveli! Medicine for the Heart
- 1988 - A Blank Buffet
- 1988 - Ry Cooder and the Moula Banda Rhythm Aces
- 1989 - The Best of Blank
- 1989 - J'ai Été Au Bal / I Went to the Dance
- 1990 - Yum, Yum, Yum! A Taste of Cajun and Creole Cooking
- 1991 - Innocents Abroad
- 1991 - Julie: Old Time Tales of the Blue Ridge
- 1991 - Marc & Ann
- 1991 - Puamana
- 1994 - The Maestro: King of the Cowboy Artists
- 1994 - My Old Fiddle: A Visit with Tommy Jarrell in the Blue Ridge
- 1994 - Roots of Rhythm (cinematographer)
- 1995 - Sworn to the Drum: A Tribute to Francisco Aguabella
- 2005 - The Maestro Rides Again
- 2007 - All in This Tea (co-directed with Gina Leibrecht)
- 2014 - How to Smell a Rose: A Visit with Ricky Leacock in Normandy (co-directed with Gina Leibrecht)
- 2015 - Les Blank's Student Films

≠National Film Registry inductee (former 1993; latter 2004)
