= Marvin the Martian filmography =

Marvin the Martian has been featured in various media since his debut in 1948. Mel Blanc provided the voice of Marvin until 1986. Chuck Jones directed every Marvin cartoon made until 1986.

== 1940s ==
- Haredevil Hare (1948)

== 1950s ==
- The Hasty Hare (1952)
- Duck Dodgers in the 24½th Century (1953)
- Hare-Way to the Stars (1958)

== 1960s ==
- Mad as a Mars Hare (1963)

== 1980s ==
- Duck Dodgers and the Return of the 24½th Century (1980)
- Bugs Bunny's Bustin' Out All Over (1980)
  - Spaced Out Bunny (1980)
- Who Framed Roger Rabbit (1988) - (Movie) (Silent Cameo)

== 1990s ==
- Bugs Bunny's Lunar Tunes (1991) - Joe Alaskey
- The Man from M.A.R.S. (1993) - Rob Paulsen
- '* Superior Duck (1996) - Eric Goldberg (as Claude Raynes) (Cameo)
- Space Jam (Movie) (1996) - Bob Bergen
- Marvin the Martian in the Third Dimension (1997) - Joe Alaskey

== 2000s ==
- Tweety's High-Flying Adventure (Movie) (2000) - Joe Alaskey (Cameo)
- War of the Weirds (Kid) (2003) - Samuel Vincent
- Duck Dodgers (TV Series) (2003) - Joe Alaskey
- Looney Tunes: Back in Action (Official Movie) (2003) - Eric Goldberg
- Bah, Humduck! A Looney Tunes Christmas (Holiday Movie) (2006) - Joe Alaskey

== 2010s ==
- The Looney Tunes Show (TV Series) (2011) - Eric Bauza
- Looney Tunes: Rabbits Run (2015) - Damon Jones
- New Looney Tunes (TV Series) - Eric Bauza

== 2020s ==
- Looney Tunes Cartoons (TV Series) (2020) - Eric Bauza
- Space Jam: A New Legacy (Movie) (2021) - Eric Bauza
- Bugs Bunny Builders (TV Series) (2022) - Eric Bauza
- Coyote vs. Acme (Movie, deleted scene) (2026) - Eric Bauza

== Cameos ==
- Gravity, he appears as a toy version of the character
