= Bugs Bunny in Space =

- Directed by: Chuck Jones; Friz Freleng
- Starring: Mel Blanc
- Music by: Carl Stalling, Milt Franklyn
- Country of origin: United States
- Original language: English

Production
- Producer: Hal Geer
- Running time: 30 minutes
- Production company: Warner Bros. Television

Original release
- Network: CBS
- Release: September 6, 1977

Bugs Bunny in Space is a Looney Tunes television special that originally aired on CBS September 6, 1977. Assembled to capitalize on the enormous success of the original Star Wars film in summer 1977, the special is a compilation of clips from science fiction themed Warner Bros. Cartoons, including Duck Dodgers in the 24½th Century.

This is the only Bugs Bunny special not to include any new animation.

== Cast ==
- Mel Blanc as Bugs Bunny, Marvin the Martian (referred to as Antwerp), Daffy Duck, and Porky Pig

== Plot ==
Bugs Bunny in Space is a parody of Star Wars (1977) that features a compilation of science-fiction themed clips from Warner Brothers cartoons starring Bugs Bunny and other characters.

== Credits ==
- Produced by Hal Geer
- Directed by Chuck Jones, Friz Freleng

== Cartoons featured ==
- The Hasty Hare
- Hare-Way to the Stars
- Mad as a Mars Hare
- His Hare-Raising Tale
- Duck Dodgers in the 24½th Century

Haredevil Hare (Released Prior to August 1948) is not included. Due to being sold to a.a.p. in 1956.
