= Duck Dodgers in the 24½th Century =

1953 film by Chuck Jones

Duck Dodgers in the 24 1/2^{th} Century
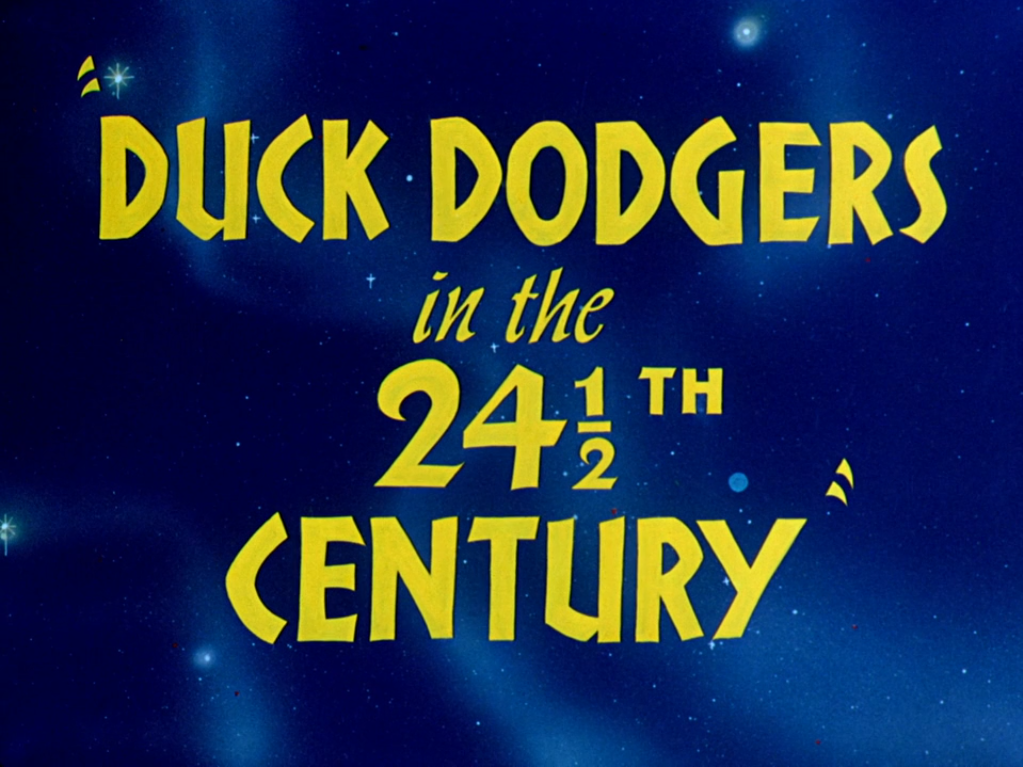
- Title card
- Directed by: Charles M. Jones
- Story by: Michael Maltese
- Based on: Buck Rogers by Philip Francis Nowlan
- Starring: Mel Blanc (all voices)
- Music by: Carl Stalling
- Animation by: Lloyd Vaughan; Ken Harris; Ben Washam; Effects Animator: Harry Love
- Layouts by: Maurice Noble
- Backgrounds by: Philip DeGuard
- Color process: Technicolor
- Production company: Warner Bros. Cartoons
- Distributed by: Warner Bros. Pictures; The Vitaphone Corporation
- Release date: July 25, 1953 (U.S.)
- Running time: 7:03
- Language: English

Duck Dodgers in the 24 1/2^{th} Century (spoken as "twenty-fourth-and-a-half") is a 1953 Warner Bros. Merrie Melodies cartoon directed by Chuck Jones. The cartoon was released on July 25, 1953, and stars Daffy Duck as space hero Duck Dodgers, Porky Pig as his assistant (the Eager Young Space Cadet), and Marvin the Martian as his opponent. This cartoon marked the first of many appearances of the Duck Dodgers character.

Marvin the Martian had been introduced as an unnamed villain in Warner's cartoon Haredevil Hare (1948), playing opposite Bugs Bunny (Marvin would not receive his proper name until 1979). He was later given the title 'Commander, Flying Saucer X-2' in 1952's The Hasty Hare. The Duck Dodgers cartoon is an extended parody of the pulp magazine, newspaper comic strip, and comic book character Buck Rogers, and his longtime run of space adventures, Buck Rogers in the 25th Century.

In 1994, Duck Dodgers was voted #4 of The 50 Greatest Cartoons of all time by members of the animation field. Because he was such a fan of the short in particular, Star Wars creator George Lucas attempted to arrange that the short be shown before the original Star Wars film during its initial run in theaters and succeeded in making this happen for screenings at the Cinema 21 in San Francisco. In 2004 at the 62nd World Science Fiction Convention, it was retrospectively nominated for a Retro Hugo Award for Best Dramatic Presentation—Short Form.

== Plot ==
Flag of Earth in Duck Dodgers in the 24½th Century

Flag of Mars in Duck Dodgers in the 24½th Century

In the latter half of 24th century (around 2350), Duck Dodgers (Daffy Duck) is tasked with locating the uncharted "Planet X", the only known remaining source for the dwindling element Illudium Phosdex, "the shaving cream atom". After a few small mishaps, Dodgers and his assistant, the "Eager Young Space Cadet" (Porky Pig) set off by rocket. Once in flight, Dodgers plots what becomes an enormously complicated and inefficient course to Planet X, whereas the Cadet suggests a much simpler route, following a path of nearby planets bearing the letters of the alphabet (in order from A onward). After scoffing at the idea, Dodgers suddenly comes up with the same idea and takes credit for it. The ship then flies past the lettered planets and arrives on Planet X.

Dodgers immediately claims the planet in the name of the Earth, but is quickly greeted by Marvin the Martian, as he claims it in the name of Mars. In the ensuing battle, Dodgers is shot multiple times in the face and disintegrated and reintegrated once. The battle continues through most of the film, until Dodgers finally declares enough is enough, and deploys his "secret weapon" that surrounds Marvin's ship with explosives. Marvin deploys the same type of weapon against Dodgers' ship. When the two simultaneously detonate their weapons, the entire planet is destroyed, save for a small chunk. Dodgers pushes Marvin off this chunk, and once again claims it in his own name, as the Cadet and Marvin are seen hanging from a root underneath the chunk. The Cadet sarcastically dismisses Dodgers' claim as a "Big deal."

== Cast ==
- Mel Blanc as Duck Dodgers, The Eager Young Space Cadet, Marvin the Martian and Dr. I.Q. Hi

== Credits ==
The cartoon was directed by Chuck Jones (credited as Charles M. Jones), with the story by Michael Maltese, voices by Mel Blanc, and original music by Carl Stalling. The animation was credited to Lloyd Vaughan, Ken Harris and Ben Washam, with Harry Love receiving a credit for effects animation. The distinctive layouts were designed by Maurice Noble and the backgrounds produced by Phil DeGuard.

Uncredited are Stalling's quotations of "Powerhouse" and "Egyptian Barn Dance" (in the opening credits), by Raymond Scott.

== Production ==
Jones saw Porky Pig's sidekick role as set apart from Daffy as the hero: "I always felt that Porky Pig was the subtlest of all the characters because he was consciously playing a part. He's obviously putting Daffy on, but it's a very subtle thing. In Duck Dodgers in the 24 1/2th Century, he was playing the space cadet, but he was aware that he was playing it. He was like I would be in a class play — in which the hero really thought he was the character."

== Reception ==
Comic book writer Mark Evanier writes, "Director Chuck Jones and writer Mike Maltese inverted the usual cartoon convention of having the hero conquer the villain. Here, Daffy pretty much conquers himself with faulty disintegration rays and faultier personal swagger. As with the other times Jones handled the duck, the Oliver Hardy principle prevails: The joke is never the destruction that befalls the luckless character but their loss of dignity afterward."

== Sequels and related media ==
- Duck Dodgers and the Return of the 24½th Century (1980)
- Tiny Toon Adventures: "Duck Dodgers Jr.", segment in the episode "The Return of the Acme Acres Zone" (1990)
- Marvin the Martian in the Third Dimension (1996), a 3-D cartoon
- Superior Duck (1996)
- Attack of the Drones (2003)
- Duck Dodgers (2003–2005), television series on Cartoon Network

== Home media ==
This cartoon is available on Disc 2 of the Looney Tunes Golden Collection: Volume 1 DVD set, and on Disc 2 of the Looney Tunes Platinum Collection: Volume 1 Blu-ray box set, with the cartoon restored in high definition, as well as Disc 1 of The Essential Daffy Duck. The short was included as a bonus feature on Disc 1 of the Duck Dodgers: The Complete Series Blu-ray set.

The cartoon's copyright was renewed in 1980. (Note: Under RE0000048108)

== In popular culture ==
The cartoon can be seen in the background of one scene in Steven Spielberg's film Close Encounters of the Third Kind (1977).

== Awards ==
Year	Award/Recognition	Result
1977	Special screening before the original Star Wars film	Selected by George Lucas
1994	The 50 Greatest Cartoons	Ranked #4
2004	Retro Hugo Award – Best Dramatic Presentation, Short Form	Nominated at 62nd World Science Fiction Convention

== See also ==
- Buck Rogers in the 25th Century
- List of cartoons featuring Daffy Duck
- List of Marvin the Martian cartoons
- List of cartoons featuring Porky Pig
