= Oily Hare =

1952 film by Robert McKimson

- Title card
- Directed by: Robert McKimson
- Story by: Tedd Pierce
- Starring: Mel Blanc; Bea Benaderet
- Music by: Carl Stalling
- Animation by: Charles McKimson; Phil De Lara; Rod Scribner; Herman Cohen; Keith Darling
- Layouts by: Peter Alvarado
- Backgrounds by: Richard H. Thomas
- Color process: Technicolor
- Production company: Warner Bros. Cartoons
- Distributed by: Warner Bros. Pictures; The Vitaphone Corporation
- Release date: July 26, 1952
- Running time: 7:10
- Language: English

Oily Hare is a 1952 Warner Bros. Merrie Melodies animated short directed by Robert McKimson and written by Tedd Pierce. The short was released on July 26, 1952, and stars Bugs Bunny.

The plot shares similarities to the plot of the short The Fair-Haired Hare, released one year earlier featuring Yosemite Sam as Bugs' antagonist. Oily Hare recycles the same ending where Bugs' home is filled with explosives and blown up.

== Plot ==
Bugs Bunny gets caught up in a Texas oil-rich environment with a Yosemite Sam-like oil mogul. Bugs' rabbit hole, inconveniently situated in an oil field, becomes the focal point of a clash as the tycoon, Devil Rich Texan, tries to tap into the land's oil resources. Despite Bugs' protests that the hole is his home, Devil Rich Texan and his trusty assistant, Maverick, attempt to forcibly remove him. Their comedic efforts include failed dynamite explosions and a botched shooting attempt, all while Bugs outsmarts them at every turn.

In a final twist, Bugs' ingenious solution results in a surprising outcome: instead of oil, a geyser of carrots erupts from the hole, leaving Devil Rich Texan and Maverick bewildered and Bugs triumphant. With a nod to the absurdity of the situation, Bugs acknowledges the incredulity of the audience, reminding them that in "Tex-ay-us", anything can happen.

== Home media ==
DVD: Looney Tunes Golden Collection: Volume 5

Preceded by The Hasty Hare	Bugs Bunny Cartoons; 1952	Succeeded by Rabbit Seasoning
