= Duck Dodgers =

Fictional cartoon character

- Duck Dodgers in the Mars Exploration Rover Opportunity mission patch
- First appearance: Duck Dodgers in the 24½th Century (1953)
- Last appearance: "Bonafide Heroes" (2005)
- Created by: Chuck Jones; Michael Maltese
- Voiced by: Mel Blanc (1953, 1980); Joe Alaskey (1990–1991, 1996, 2003–2005, 2014); Jeff Bergman (1991–1992, 2018); Greg Burson (1993); Frank Gorshin (1996); Jeff Bennett (2004); Eric Bauza (2018–2026)

In-universe information
- Full name: Duck Edgar Dumas Aloysius Eoghain Dodgers
- Alias: Daffy Duck

Duck Dodgers is the star of a series of cartoons produced by Warner Bros., featuring Daffy Duck in the role of a science fiction hero.

He first appeared in the 1953 cartoon short Duck Dodgers in the 24½th Century, directed by Chuck Jones as a spoof of the popular Buck Rogers in the 25th Century and Flash Gordon science fiction serials of the 1930s, casting the brash, egomaniacal Daffy Duck as the hero of the story, with Porky Pig as his sidekick, Eager Young Space Cadet. The plot of the cartoon involves Duck Dodgers' search for the rare element Illudium Phosdex, "the shaving cream atom", the only remaining supply of which is on the mysterious "Planet X". Just after Dodgers has claimed Planet X in the name of the Earth, Marvin the Martian lands on the same planet and claims it in the name of Mars. The stage is set for a battle of wits, not to mention various forms of weaponry, most of which tend to backfire comically on Dodgers.

Considering the period in which the cartoon was produced (the Red Scare was in full swing during the 1950s era), some scholars have used the cartoon to parallel the supposed futility of the Cold War and the arms race.

== Duck Dodgers sequels ==
The second short, also produced by Chuck Jones and with Mel Blanc reprising his roles, was titled Duck Dodgers and the Return of the 24½th Century and was released in 1980. The plot of this sequel cartoon was nearly a carbon copy of the original though this time, Marvin says he is trying to solve the Earth's energy crisis (by blowing up the Earth); Marvin succeeds in launching his missile and at the end of the cartoon reminds everyone that it's only a cartoon.

The third short, titled Marvin the Martian in the Third Dimension, was a 3D cartoon released in 1996 to select venues, and had impressionist Joe Alaskey providing Duck Dodgers' voice. These included the flagship Warner Bros. Studio Store in Manhattan, and Warner Bros. Movie World theme parks on the Gold Coast, Australia and in Bottrop-Kirchhellen, Germany. It included a range of interactive effects including a splash with water. Unlike the other Dodgers cartoons, Porky Pig did not appear.

A short titled Superior Duck was released in 1996, with Frank Gorshin as Daffy. While Superior Duck was mostly a Superman pastiche, including a cameo by Superman himself, Porky Pig cameoed as the Eager Young Space Cadet after Superior Duck is disintegrated by Marvin.

Another short, titled Attack of the Drones, was made in 2003 and featured Jeff Bennett as the voice of Duck Dodgers. This short was part of a series of new shorts, but because of the failure of Looney Tunes: Back in Action, it was not released theatrically. However, the short was included as a special feature on disc two of The Essential Daffy Duck DVD set.

== Further appearances ==
- Duck Dodgers (voiced by Jeff Bergman) also made an appearance in a Tiny Toon Adventures segment titled "Duck Dodgers Jr." (in the episode "The Return of the Acme Acres Zone"), where Daffy Duck's pint-sized protégé and student Plucky Duck also visited the futuristic world of Duck Dodgers. Here Marvin the Martian appears with his niece, Marcia. Duck Dodgers also makes an appearance in Star Warners.
- A SNES and Game Boy game called Daffy Duck: The Marvin Missions (in which he is voiced by Greg Burson), as well as a Nintendo 64 video game, entitled Duck Dodgers Starring Daffy Duck (or Daffy Duck Starring As Duck Dodgers, depending on region), have also been produced. He also appeared in the game Looney Tunes: Acme Arsenal, voiced by Alaskey.
- The original cartoon also appeared in a 1994 episode of the science fiction series Babylon 5 (also produced by WB), where it was revealed that Duck Dodgers in the 24½th Century was Security Chief Michael Garibaldi's "second favorite thing in the universe". One episode shows Garibaldi laughing uproariously at the cartoon, as Ambassador Delenn watches it with him, appearing totally bewildered.
- Portions of this cartoon can be seen and heard in the background in a scene from the 1977 movie Close Encounters of the Third Kind.
- Duck Dodgers, again voiced by Alaskey, appears in the 2003 feature Looney Tunes: Back in Action when Daffy notes that the only character that could save the film's proverbial day was Duck Dodgers; Daffy then realizes that Dodgers is his alter ego. He ends up defeating Marvin and saving humanity, after several jet packs exploded when he said his name.
  Duck Dodgers as seen in the 2003 Duck Dodgers episode "Wrath of Canasta"
  Duck Dodgers as a Green Lantern
- From 2003 to 2005, Cartoon Network aired a Duck Dodgers TV series. In this show, which had Joe Alaskey returning as the titular character's voice, Duck Edgar Dumas Aloysius Eoghain Dodgers started out as a hapless soul that was accidentally frozen for over three hundred years for reasons not known. He was later revived by Dr. I.Q. Hi in the 24½th century.
  Through scheming and lies he managed to trick everyone into believing he was a 21st-century hero. In reality, he was only a water boy for the Midstate University football team, and "Quarterback Quack" shows that he only carried out this façade at the insistence of a time-traveling Martian Commander X-2, who unwittingly made Dodgers into the hero he was known as.
  Dodgers is arrogant, selfish, greedy, lazy, cowardly, gullible, and not particularly intelligent. However, he occasionally displays surprisingly high levels of heroism and competence, suggesting that he is not quite as daft as he appears to be, although he mostly succeeds through sheer dumb luck and the work of the Eager Young Space Cadet. Martian Commander X-2 actually caused Dodgers to become a minor football star in the final game of the season, which is what he used to parlay himself into captaincy in the Protectorate, meaning that he is, technically, not lying when he claims he won a championship football game in his own time.
  It is implied that he can't read, though this is contradicted several times. He also has shown to have quite the ego, when he caused the energy core of his ship to explode while using the lasers to carve his name on a nearby planetoid for example, and burning out the auxiliary core to make toast.
  In "The Green Loontern", Duck Dodgers accidentally got his costume mixed up with Hal Jordan's Green Lantern costume at the dry cleaners where the rest of the Green Lantern Corps mistook him for Hal Jordan. He ended up fighting Sinestro until Hal Jordan arrived and regained his costume to help defeat Sinestro.
  Though he doesn't show it often, Dodgers cares deeply for his Cadet, even though he often demeans and puts him through humiliating situations. In "Of Course You Know, This Means War and Peace" Pt. 1, he is described by Psy Q. Hi as an ego-maniacal, bipolar, narcissist, and pathological liar with sociopathic tendencies.
- Duck Dodgers' Green Loontern appearance appears as a playable character in the 2014 video game Lego Batman 3: Beyond Gotham. This was also Alaskey's final performance as the character before his death in 2016.
- In the Bugs Bunny Builders episode "Rock On", Daffy's costume is Duck Dodgers. When the other Looney Builders glare at him, he asks "Wrong galaxy?"

== Legacy ==
In 2003, both Duck Dodgers and Marvin the Martian were featured on separate 1st Space Launch Squadron mission patches for that year's Mars Exploration Rover missions.
