= Now Hare This =

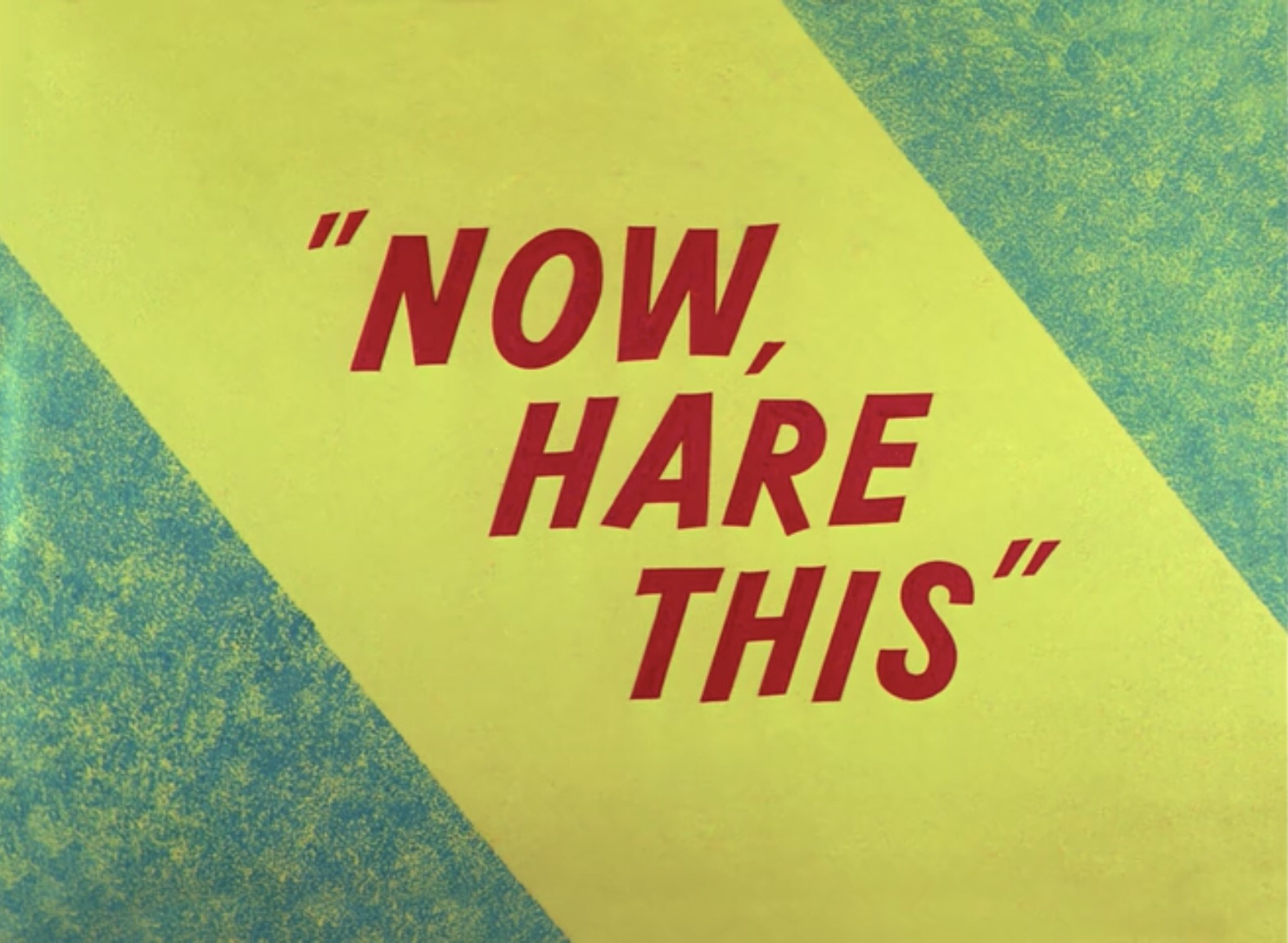
- Title card
- Directed by: Robert McKimson
- Story by: Tedd Pierce
- Starring: Mel Blanc
- Edited by: Treg Brown
- Music by: Milt Franklyn
- Animation by: Tom Ray; George Grandpre; Ted Bonnicksen; Warren Batchelder
- Layouts by: Robert Gribbroek
- Backgrounds by: William Butler
- Color process: Technicolor
- Production company: Warner Bros. Cartoons
- Distributed by: Warner Bros. Pictures
- Release date: May 31, 1958 (USA)
- Running time: 6:17
- Language: English

Now Hare This is a 1958 Warner Bros. Looney Tunes cartoon directed by Robert McKimson and written by Tedd Pierce. The short was released on May 31, 1958, and stars Bugs Bunny.

== Plot ==
The story involves Bugs Bunny eluding the Big Bad Wolf and his nephew. After the elder wolf is unable to catch Bugs through traditional means, he gets inspiration from his nephew, who gives him ideas for catching Bugs based on nursery rhymes.

First, the wolves lure Bugs into playing Little Red Riding Hood so the Big Bad Wolf, who is playing Grandma, can trap Bugs. But Bugs escapes by putting hot coals from a fireplace into the bed that Big Bad is in.

Next, Bugs plays Goldilocks in The Story of the Three Bears. Big Bad thinks that he has Bugs trapped again, and tries to get revenge by using hot coals on the bed that Bugs is supposed to be in. But instead Big Bad lights a dynamite stick attached to fake rabbit ears and the dynamite explodes in his face.

Bugs then proceeds to explain to the exasperated Big Bad how he can have a rabbit for dinner, and the cartoon concludes with Big Bad and his nephew sharing dinner with Bugs, who says, "If you can't eat 'em, join 'em", as the cartoon fades out.

Preceded by Hare-Way to the Stars	Bugs Bunny Cartoons; 1958	Succeeded by Knighty Knight Bugs
