= Bob Bergen =

American voice actor (born 1964)

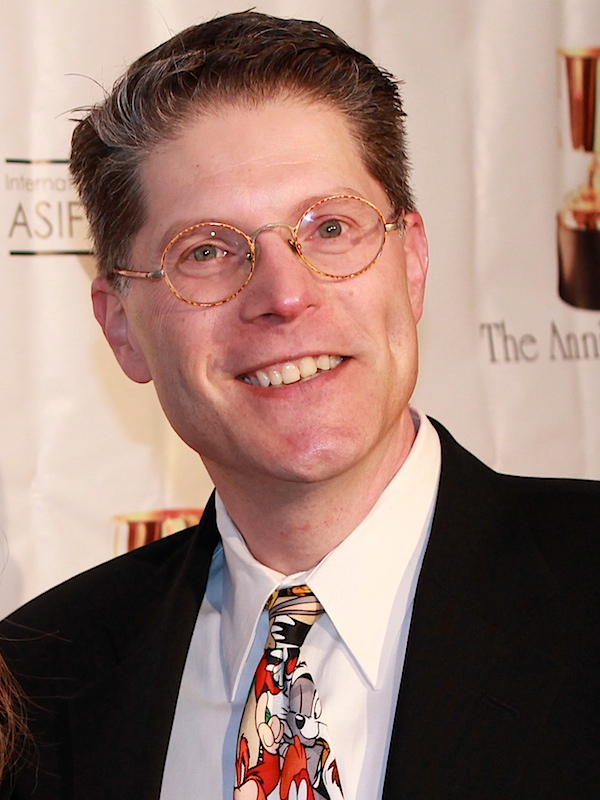
- Bergen at the 2014 Annie Awards
- Born: Bob Berger; March 8, 1964 (age 62); St. Louis, Missouri, U.S.
- Other name: Bob S. Berger
- Occupation: Voice actor
- Years active: 1980–present
- Spouse: Scott Bergen (m. 2023; div. 2024)
- Website: bobbergen.com

Bob Berger (born March 8, 1964), known professionally as Bob Bergen, is an American voice actor. He voices Warner Bros. cartoon characters Porky Pig and Tweety and has voiced characters in the English dubs of various anime. He formerly hosted the children's game show Jep!, adapted from the game show Jeopardy!. Including all roles, he is among the highest-grossing actors of all time.

== Early life ==
In his childhood, Bergen would often spend hours watching and taping cartoons, imitating voices as well as creating characters of his own. He once told his parents that he wanted to voice Porky Pig, to which his mother objected.

As a teenager in 1978, he phoned Mel Blanc after researching in phone books. He crashed a recording session for the live stage show version of Bugs Bunny in Space, pretending to be Blanc's assistant, and watched him in action. Upon the realization that he needed training and for his voice to change, he began studying voice-over with coaches in Los Angeles. He took acting lessons with Daws Butler at his weekly voice-over workshop. He also met June Foray during a live reading of The Adventures of Rocky and Bullwinkle and Friends while attending an ASIFA-Hollywood show at a mall in Woodland Hills. In March 1980, Bergen appeared as a contestant on a Teen Week episode of Wheel of Fortune, winning prizes including a watch. After two years at a Meisner acting conservatory and three years of improv study with The Groundlings, he was able to secure an agent at age 18 and pursue his dream, while working as a tour guide at Universal Studios to make ends meet.

== Career ==
In 1990, Bergen joined a handful of actors voicing the Looney Tunes characters, beginning with Tiny Toon Adventures. He is the current voice of Porky Pig, and has also voiced Tweety, Barnyard Dawg, Henery Hawk, Hubie and Bertie, Marvin the Martian, Ralph Wolf, Sylvester Jr., Speedy Gonzales, and Wile E. Coyote, alternating the roles with Jeff Bergman, Mel Blanc's son Noel Blanc, Joe Alaskey, Greg Burson, Jim Cummings, Maurice LaMarche, Billy West, and Eric Bauza. Warner Bros. had been splitting up the various voice-acting roles to prevent any one of them from being a singular successor. Bergen had previously voiced Bugs Bunny and Daffy Duck for ABC Family Fun Fair, an annual stage show for disabled children in the 1980s.

Bergen provided the voice of Arsène Lupin III for the Streamline Pictures dubs in the late 1980s and early 1990s: The Mystery of Mamo (directed by Sōji Yoshikawa), The Castle of Cagliostro (directed by Hayao Miyazaki) and Lupin III's Greatest Capers (two TV episodes from series two directed by Hayao Miyazaki). He also played the part of No-Face in the 2001 Academy Award-winning movie Spirited Away, and Kai and Masaru in the Streamline-dubbed version of the anime classic Akira. He is also responsible for the voices of Luke Skywalker in over a dozen Star Wars video games as well as the Robot Chicken episodes Episode I, II and III; Wembley and the World's Oldest Fraggle in Fraggle Rock: The Animated Series, the animated versions of Dr. Bunsen Honeydew and Link Hogthrob in Little Muppet Monsters, and additional characters in the 1987–89 seasons of Muppet Babies. He also voiced Wind-Up in Skylanders: Swap Force, Skylanders: Trap Team and Skylanders: SuperChargers.

He has also been the announcer for many promos and commercials on Disney Channel from 1997 to 2001.

In 1998, Bergen hosted Jep!, the children's version of Jeopardy!, on Game Show Network. He appeared as himself in interview segments of the 2014 documentary I Know That Voice, and in a 2017 episode of the ABC game show To Tell the Truth. On May 2, 2024, Bergen was revealed to be an announcer for MeTV Toons.

== Personal life ==
Bergen is Jewish.

== Filmography ==
=== Animation ===
List of voice performances in animation
Year	Title	Role	Notes	Source
1985	Little Muppet Monsters	Link Hogthrob, Dr. Bunsen Honeydew	13 episodes	
1987	Fraggle Rock	Wembley Fraggle, additional voices	13 episodes	
1990–1992	Tiny Toon Adventures	Porky Pig, Tweety Bird	2 episodes	
1999	Sabrina: The Animated Series	Tim the Witchsmeller, Elton the Aardvark	Recurring role	
2001	The Powerpuff Girls	Billy, Maitre D', Guard #1, Crook #2	Episode: "Film Flam"	
2001	Totally Spies!	Ricky Mathis, Scientist, Worker #2	Episode: "A Thing for Musicians"	
2003–2005	Duck Dodgers	Eager Young Space Cadet		
2006–2008	The Emperor's New School	Bucky the Squirrel	27 episodes	
2006–2018	Robot Chicken	Porky Pig, Luke Skywalker, Roger Rabbit, Fear, Various		
2007	Loonatics Unleashed	Pinkster Pig	Episode: "In the Pinkster"	
2009	Laff Riot	Porky Pig, Tweety Bird	Unaired pilot for The Looney Tunes Show	
2010–2014	Star Wars: The Clone Wars	Lama Su	3 episodes	
2011–2014	The Looney Tunes Show	Porky Pig		
2014	Avengers Assemble	Winter Soldier	Episode: "Ghosts of the Past"	
2015–2016	TripTank	Chicken / Kooky / Egg	3 episodes	
2015–2020	New Looney Tunes	Porky Pig, Tweety Bird, Gabby Goat, Clyde Bunny		
2016	Mr. Pickles	Crime Man	Episode: "Shövenpucker"	
2017	Bunnicula	Woody	Episode: "Dating for Dummies"	
2018	Dallas & Robo	Grizzled Trucker	Episode: "I Was a Teenage Cannibal Biker"	
2019	OK K.O.! Let's Be Heroes	Scoutmaster	Episode: "Sidekick Scouts"	
2020–2023	Looney Tunes Cartoons	Porky Pig, Cicero Pig, The Gremlin and Dead End Kid	Various shorts	
2021–2023	Star Wars: The Bad Batch	Lama Su	6 episodes	
2021	Ridley Jones	Mr. Peabody		
2022–2025	Bugs Bunny Builders	Porky Pig, Cecil Turtle		
2023–2025	Tiny Toons Looniversity	Porky Pig		

=== Anime ===
Year	Title	Role	Notes
1979–1980	Tales of the Wolf	Arsène Lupin III/The Wolf	
1989	Megazone 23	Shogo Yahagi	Streamline Pictures dub
1990–1991	The Secret of Blue Water	Dr. Ayerton	Original dub
1992–1993	Teknoman	Blade/Teknoman	
1993	Crimson Wolf	Kai	
2001	Spirited Away	No-Face	English dub

=== Film ===
List of voice performances in feature films
Year	Title	Role	Notes	Source
1941	Bambi	Adult Bambi (trailer for 1988 re-release)		
1991	Rover Dangerfield	Gangster / Animal	Credited as Robert Bergen	
1996	Space Jam	Porky Pig, Tweety, Marvin the Martian, Barnyard Dawg, Hubie and Bertie		
1996	The Hunchback of Notre Dame	Achilles the Horse		
1996	Dunston Checks In	Dunston		
1997	Cats Don't Dance	Man	Additional voices	
1997	Hercules	Baby Hercules	Additional voices	
1998	Quest for Camelot	King Arthur's Soldiers and Ruber's Minions	Additional voices	
1998	Mulan	Shang's Horse	Additional voices, Uncredited	
1998	A Bug's Life	Aphie and Male Ants	Additional voices	
1999	Tarzan	Vincent Snipes	Additional voices	
1999	The Iron Giant	George the Army Diver Sub	Additional voices	
1999	Toy Story 2	Green Army Men	Additional voices	
2000	The Emperor's New Groove	Bucky the Squirrel, Fly stuck in spider web		
2001	Spirited Away	No Face and Aogaeru		
2001	Monsters, Inc.	Lanky Schmidt		
2001	Atlantis: The Lost Empire	Loop Group and Squad Leader		
2002	Lilo & Stitch	Officer	Credited as Robert Bergen	
2002	The Santa Clause 2	Comet		
2002	Treasure Planet	Robot on ladder and Mr. Snuff	Additional voices	
2003	Brother Bear	Horrified Fish		
2003	Looney Tunes: Back in Action	Porky Pig	Cameo	
2003	Finding Nemo	Blenny		
2004	Shrek 2	Additional voices	ADR Group	
2004	The Incredibles	Firefighters	Uncredited	
2006	Cars	ADR Loop Group		
2006	Happily N'Ever After	Additional voices		
2008	Horton Hears a Who!	Male Who		
2009	Cloudy with a Chance of Meatballs	Additional voices		
2009	Up	Dogs		
2010	Tangled	Additional voices		
2010	Toy Story 3	additional voices		
2010	Despicable Me	additional voices	ADR Group	
2012	The Lorax	Additional voices		
2012	Wreck-It Ralph	Additional voices		
2013	Escape from Planet Earth	3D Movie Guy		
2013	Monsters University	Merv		
2013	Despicable Me 2	Additional voices		
2015	Minions	Additional voices		
2015	Inside Out	Additional voices	Uncredited	
2016	Trolls	Additional voices		
2016	Sing	Additional voices		
2017	Despicable Me 3	Additional voices		
2019	Toy Story 4	Additional voices		
2021	Space Jam: A New Legacy	Tweety		
2021	Seal Team	Seal, Octopus		
2025	Zootopia 2	Additional voices	uncredited	
2026	Toy Story 5	Additional voices		

==== Direct-to-video films ====
List of voice performances in direct-to-video and television films
Year	Title	Role	Notes	Source
1978	Lupin III: The Mystery of Mamo	Lupin III	Streamline dub	
1979	Lupin III: The Castle of Cagliostro	Lupin III/The Wolf	Streamline dub	
1987	Lily C.A.T.	Hiro Tagaki		
1988	Akira	Masaru, Kaisuke / Mitsuru Kuwata / Harukiya bartender	Additional voices Streamline dub	
2000	Help! I'm a Fish	Joe's Minions		
2001	Scooby-Doo and the Cyber Chase	Eric Staufer		
2005	Kronk's New Groove	Bucky the Squirrel		
2006	Bah, Humduck! A Looney Tunes Christmas	Porky Pig, Tweety Bird, Speedy Gonzales		
2008	Tinker Bell	Fireflies		
2009	Tinker Bell and the Lost Treasure	Bugs / Creatures		
2010	Tinker Bell and the Great Fairy Rescue	Additional voices		
2011	A Letter to Momo	Mame		
2012	Foodfight!	Additional voices		
2015	Looney Tunes: Rabbits Run	Porky Pig		

=== Live-action ===
- Army of Darkness — Necronomicon Ex-Mortis, various Creature voices
- Beetleborgs Metallix — Roo-thless (voice, shared role with Lance Wingnut)
- Dunston Checks In — Dunston's vocal effects
- Fright Night Part 2 — Various Vampire and Creature vocal effects
- Ghoulies III: Ghoulies Go to College — Rat Ghoulie (voice)
- Gremlins — Various Gremlins voices (credited as Bob Berger)
- I Know That Voice — Himself
- Jep! — Host
- Look Who's Talking Now — Additional Dogs and Wolves voices
- Total Recall — Customs Agent (voice), additional voices
- The Santa Clause 2 — Comet the Reindeer
- The Santa Clause 3: The Escape Clause — Comet the Reindeer
- Hell's Kitchen — Himself
- Wicked: For Good — Additional voices

=== Video games ===
- Bugs Bunny's Birthday Ball — Porky Pig, Tweety Bird
- Boom Blox — Additional voices
- Disney Universe — HEX
- Disney Sports Soccer — Sports Announcer
- Disney Sports Basketball — Sports Announcer
- Disney Sports Football — Sports Announcer
- Disney Sports Skateboarding — Sports Announcer
- Escape From Monkey Island — Whipp the Lucre Lawyer
- Infamous First Light — Additional voices
- Looney Tunes: Cartoon Conductor – Porky Pig, Tweety Bird
- Looney Tunes Racing — Porky Pig
- Looney Tunes: Acme Arsenal — Porky Pig, Evil Porky Pig, Dr. Frankenbeans
- Looney Tunes: Back in Action — Porky Pig, Tweety Bird
- Looney Tunes: World of Mayhem — Porky Pig, Tweety Bird, Sylvester Jr.
- Looney Tunes: Space Race — Porky Pig
- Scooby-Doo and Looney Tunes: Cartoon Universe — Porky Pig, Tweety Bird
- Sheep Raider — Porky Pig
- Skylanders: SuperChargers — Wind-Up
- Skylanders: Swap Force — Wind-Up
- Skylanders: Trap Team — Wind-Up
- Star Wars: Battlefront II — Luke Skywalker
- Star Wars: Episode I: Racer — Gasgano, Ody Mandrell
- Star Wars: Episode I – The Phantom Menace — Alien Pedestrian, Coruscant Thug #3, EV-7G, Gungan Citizen #2
- Star Wars: Force Commander — Coruscant Palace Guard, Luke Skywalker
- Star Wars: Galactic Battlegrounds — Luke Skywalker, Reytha Soldier
- Star Wars: Jedi Knight: Jedi Academy — Luke Skywalker, Saboteur 2
- Star Wars Jedi Knight II: Jedi Outcast — Luke Skywalker
- Star Wars: Masters of Teräs Käsi — Luke Skywalker
- Star Wars: Racer Revenge — Ody Mandrell, Gasgano
- Star Wars: Rebellion — Luke Skywalker
- Star Wars: Rogue Squadron — Luke Skywalker
- Star Wars Rogue Squadron II: Rogue Leader — Luke Skywalker
- Star Wars Rogue Squadron III: Rebel Strike — Luke Skywalker
- Star Wars: Shadows of the Empire — Luke Skywalker (PC version)
- Star Wars: The Old Republic — Additional voices
- Star Wars: X-Wing Alliance — Luke Skywalker, Civilian Officer
- Star Wars: X-Wing vs. TIE Fighter — Rebel Pilot #5
- Sylvester and Tweety in Cagey Capers — Tweety Bird
- The Junkyard Run — Porky Pig

=== Shorts ===
Year	Title	Role	Notes
1995	Carrotblanca	Tweety, The Crusher	

== Awards and nominations ==
Year	Result	Show	Character	Category	Award Show
2004	Nominated	Duck Dodgers	Porky Pig/Eager Young Space Cadet	Outstanding Voice Acting in an Animated Television Production	Annie Awards
2011	Nominated	The Looney Tunes Show: Jailbird And Jailbunny	Porky Pig	Outstanding Voice-Over Performance	Emmy Awards
2013	Nominated	The Looney Tunes Show: We're in Big Truffle	Porky Pig	Outstanding Voice-Over Performance	Emmy Awards
2019	Nominated	New Looney Tunes	Porky Pig	Outstanding Performer in an Animated Program	Emmy Awards
2023	Nominated	Looney Tunes Cartoons	Porky Pig	Children's and Family Emmy Award for Outstanding Voice Performance in an Animated Program	Emmy Awards
