= Looney Tunes: Back in Action =

2003 film by Joe Dante

- Theatrical release poster
- Directed by: Joe Dante (Note: Animation direction by Eric Goldberg)
- Written by: Larry Doyle
- Story by: Larry Doyle; John Requa; Glenn Ficarra
- Based on: Looney Tunes by Warner Bros.
- Produced by: Paula Weinstein; Bernie Goldmann
- Starring: Brendan Fraser; Jenna Elfman; Timothy Dalton; Joan Cusack; Heather Locklear; Steve Martin
- Cinematography: Dean Cundey
- Edited by: Marshall Harvey; Rick W. Finney
- Music by: Jerry Goldsmith (Note: Additional music by John Debney)
- Production companies: Warner Bros. Feature Animation; Baltimore/Spring Creek Productions; Goldmann Pictures
- Distributed by: Warner Bros. Pictures
- Release dates: November 9, 2003 (premiere); November 14, 2003 (United States)
- Running time: 90 minutes
- Country: United States
- Language: English
- Budget: $80 million
- Box office: $68.5 million

Looney Tunes: Back in Action is a 2003 American fantasy comedy film directed by Joe Dante and written by Larry Doyle. The live-action animated film stars Brendan Fraser, Jenna Elfman and Steve Martin, with Timothy Dalton, Joan Cusack, and Heather Locklear in supporting roles. A parody of action and spy films, the plot follows Looney Tunes characters Bugs Bunny and Daffy Duck as they become intertwined in a plot by the Acme Corporation's chairman to transform the world's population into subservient monkeys using the Blue Monkey diamond, joining aspiring stuntman DJ Drake and Warner Bros. executive Kate Houghton on their journey while also seeking to rescue the former's abducted father, Damian.

The film was the result of multiple attempts by Warner Bros. Pictures to develop a sequel to Space Jam (1996). It was originally developed as Spy Jam, which was intended to star Jackie Chan in the lead role. Dante, out of a personal dislike for Space Jam, substantially reworked the project to more closely represent the original personalities of the Looney Tunes characters, with Walt Disney Animation Studios animator Eric Goldberg serving as animation director. However, Dante reportedly had little creative control on the project, and the final film became different from what he intended. The film was the last project by Warner Bros. Feature Animation and the final film scored by composer and Dante collaborator Jerry Goldsmith, who died eight months following its release; John Debney composed additional score material.

Looney Tunes: Back in Action premiered on November 9, 2003, and was theatrically released in the United States on November 14. The film received mixed reviews from critics and was a box-office failure, grossing $68.5 million on an $80 million budget. Due to the film's financial failure, Warner Bros. subsequently canceled several planned Looney Tunes projects, including new theatrical short films. At the 31st Annie Awards, the film was nominated in four categories, including Best Animated Feature.

== Plot ==
Weary of playing antagonist roles in Bugs Bunny's films, Daffy Duck demands his own animated film, only to be fired by Warner Bros.' Vice President of Comedy, Kate Houghton. Security guard and aspiring stuntman DJ Drake is ordered to escort Daffy from the studio, but Daffy escapes and the water tower is destroyed in the ensuing chase, resulting in DJ's firing. Daffy follows DJ home, where the latter receives a message from his father, actor Damian Drake, whom DJ learns is a secret agent. Damian tells DJ to travel to Las Vegas, contact his associate Dusty Tails and find the "Blue Monkey" diamond before he gets captured by the Acme Corporation, led by Mr. Chairman. DJ and Daffy depart for Las Vegas.

Bugs' routines fail without Daffy, so Kate is ordered to rehire Daffy or face termination herself. Kate and Bugs arrive at DJ's house, where they find and use Damian's TVR Tuscan in pursuit of DJ and Daffy. In Las Vegas, DJ and Daffy meet Dusty in a casino owned by Yosemite Sam, who is employed by Acme. Dusty gives them a unique playing card, which provides a clue to finding the diamond, before Sam and his henchmen, Nasty Canasta and Cottontail Smith, steal Jeff Gordon's car to pursue DJ and Daffy for the card, but they escape with Bugs and Kate aboard the Tuscan taking flight. When the Tuscan crashes in a desert, the group camps out for the night while Bugs fails to convince Daffy to take his job back, with the latter revealing he envies Bugs for being so popular with so little effort. The next day, after the group finds Walmart, Wile E. Coyote tries in vain to steal the card from the group.

The group eventually discovers Area 52, run by a woman known as Mother, who shows them a short film about the Blue Monkey, which can devolve humans into monkeys. She then equips the group with spy gadgets for their mission. Marvin the Martian, imprisoned in the facility, leads a group of other imprisoned aliens to try to steal the card, but the group escapes. Seeing the Mona Lisa's face on the card, the group conclude they must view the painting in the Louvre in Paris.

At the Louvre, the group discover that the card contains a viewing window for the Mona Lisa and use it to discover a hidden map of Africa. Elmer Fudd appears and chases Bugs and Daffy through several paintings to obtain the card. Meanwhile, Kate is kidnapped by Beaky Buzzard and Smith, Mr. Chairman's bodyguard. DJ rescues Kate, while Elmer disintegrates into tiny dots after emerging from a pointillist painting.

The group travels to Africa and meet Granny, Sylvester and Tweety, who escort them to the ruins of a jungle temple containing the Blue Monkey. There, Granny and company reveal themselves to be Mr. Chairman, Smith and Taz in disguise. Mr. Chairman teleports everyone to Acme and tricks DJ into giving him the diamond in exchange for Damian's release, with him going back on his word once the diamond is in his hands.

Marvin is sent to place the diamond in an Acme satellite's ray gun; with it, Mr. Chairman plans to turn everyone on the planet but himself into monkeys to make his products before reversing the effects so they can purchase them. DJ and Kate face off against a robotic dog and rescue Damian from one of Wile E. Coyote's death traps, while Bugs and Daffy chase Marvin into space. Marvin battles Bugs while Daffy becomes Duck Dodgers to stop the ray gun. Bugs manages to fight back and defeats Marvin by plugging his finger into his gun, imprisoning him inside his own bubble. Daffy uses his own bill to compress the ray gun's blast into two smaller ones through his nostrils. One of them reaches Earth and transforms Mr. Chairman into a monkey, leading to his arrest. Bugs and Daffy return to Earth, where it is revealed that the preceding events were staged. Bugs promises Daffy they will be equal partners, just before the latter is flattened by the Looney Tunes rings. Porky Pig attempts to close the film with "That's all, folks!", but the studio closes before he can say it, much to his indignation.

== Cast ==
=== Live-action cast ===
- Brendan Fraser as
  - Damian "D. J." Drake Jr.
  - Himself
- Jenna Elfman as Kate Houghton
- Steve Martin as Mr. Chairman
- Heather Locklear as Dusty Tails
- Timothy Dalton as Damian Drake Sr.
- Joan Cusack as Mother
- Bill Goldberg as Mr. Smith
- Marc Lawrence as Acme VP, Stating the Obvious
- Bill McKinney as Acme VP, Nitpicking
- George Murdock as Acme VP, Unfairly Promoted
- Ron Perlman as Acme VP, Never Learning
- Robert Picardo as Acme VP, Rhetorical Questions
- Leo Rossi as Acme VP, Climbing to the Top
- Vernon G. Wells as Acme VP, Child Labor
- Mary Woronov as Acme VP, Bad Ideas
- Don Stanton as Mr. Warner
- Dan Stanton as Mr. Warner's brother
- Archie Hahn as Stunt Director
- Dick Miller as Security Chief (cameo)
- Roger Corman as Hollywood Director (cameo)
- Mary Mitchel as Script Supervisor (cameo, uncredited)
- Jeff Gordon as Himself (cameo)
- Matthew Lillard as Himself (cameo)
- Kevin McCarthy as Dr. Miles Bennell (cameo)
- Peter Graves as Civil Defense Film Host (cameo, uncredited)
- Michael Jordan as Himself (cameo via archive footage from Space Jam, uncredited)

=== Voice cast ===
- Joe Alaskey as:
  - Bugs Bunny
  - Daffy Duck
  - Beaky Buzzard
  - Sylvester
  - Harrietta Bear
- Jeff Bennett as:
  - Daffy Duck ("woo-hoos") (uncredited)
  - Yosemite Sam
  - Foghorn Leghorn
  - Nasty Canasta
- Billy West as:
  - Bugs Bunny (screams) (uncredited)
  - Elmer Fudd
  - Peter Lorre
  - The Scream (uncredited)
- Eric Goldberg as:
  - Bugs Bunny (one line) (uncredited)
  - Tweety Bird
  - Marvin the Martian
  - Speedy Gonzales
- Bruce Lanoil as Pepé Le Pew
- June Foray as Granny
- Bob Bergen as Porky Pig
- Brendan Fraser as:
  - Tasmanian Devil
  - Tasmanian She-Devil
- Casey Kasem as Shaggy Rogers
- Frank Welker as Scooby-Doo
- Danny Chambers as Cottontail Smith
- Stan Freberg as Junior Bear
- Will Ryan as Henry Bear
- Danny Mann as:
  - Robo Dog
  - Spy Car
- Mel Blanc as Gremlin Car (archive recordings)
- Paul Julian as Road Runner (archive recordings) (uncredited)
- Bill Roberts as Michigan J. Frog (archive recording) (uncredited)
- Jackie Morrow as Owl Jolson (archive footage) (uncredited)
- David Graham and Peter Hawkins as Daleks (archive recordings) (uncredited)

== Production ==
=== Development ===
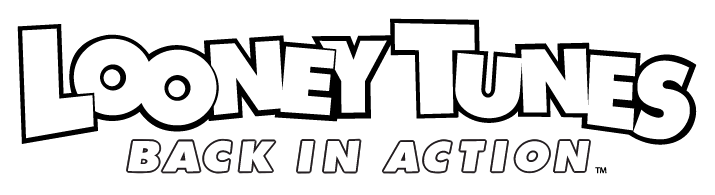
Title logo of Looney Tunes: Back in Action

Looney Tunes: Back in Action was initially developed as a direct sequel to Space Jam (1996). As development began, the film's plot was going to involve a new basketball competition with Michael Jordan and the Looney Tunes characters against a new alien villain named Berserk-O!. Bob Camp was tasked with designing Berserk-O! and his two henchmen. Joe Pytka would have returned to direct and Spike Brandt and Tony Cervone signed on as the animation supervisors. However, Jordan did not agree to star in a sequel. According to Camp, a producer lied to the studio, claiming Jordan had signed onto the film in order to start pre-production. Without Jordan involved with the project, Warner Bros. Pictures was uninterested and cancelled plans for Space Jam 2.

The film then re-entered development as a spy film titled Spy Jam, which was to star Jackie Chan. Warner Bros. was planning an additional film titled Race Jam, which would have starred racing driver Jeff Gordon. After both projects were ultimately cancelled, Warner Bros. eventually asked Joe Dante to direct Looney Tunes: Back in Action. In the early 1990s, Dante planned to direct a biographical comedy film with HBO called Termite Terrace, which centered around Looney Tunes animator Chuck Jones' early years at Warner Bros. Cartoons in the 1930s. On the project, Dante recalled, "It was a hilarious story and it was very good except that Warner Bros. said, 'Look, it's an old story. It's got period stuff in it. We don't want that. We want to rebrand our characters and we want to do Space Jam.'"

Dante agreed to direct Back in Action as a tribute to Jones. He and writer Larry Doyle reportedly wanted the film to be the "anti-Space Jam", as Dante disliked how that film represented the Looney Tunes brand and personalities. Dante said, "I was making a movie for them with those characters [Looney Tunes: Back in Action] and they did not want to know about those characters. They didn't want to know why Bugs Bunny shouldn't do hip-hop. It was a pretty grim experience all around." Warner Bros. hired Walt Disney Feature Animation's Eric Goldberg, known for his fast-paced, Warner Bros.-inspired animation of the Genie in Aladdin (1992), to direct the animation.

=== Casting ===
Actors and actresses cast for the film included Brendan Fraser as DJ Drake, Jenna Elfman as Kate Houghton, Steve Martin as Mr. Chairman, Timothy Dalton as Damian Drake, Joan Cusack as Mother, Heather Locklear as Dusty Tails, and Don and Dan Stanton as Mr. Warner and his brother. Fraser, Elfman, Martin, Dalton and Locklear stated that they were fans of Looney Tunes growing up, watching the cartoons on television during their childhood. Fraser considered Bugs Bunny his favorite character. He also came up with the idea of DJ as the stuntman of a fictionalized version of himself, who he later encounters and punches at the end of the film. This was done to poke fun at the injuries that Fraser had suffered from doing his own stunts. Fraser stated, "I wanted to take the piss out of myself before someone else would, 'cause I had it in my head that I had it coming." He called the scene where DJ punches the fictionalized Fraser "[his] vision of the worst version of [himself]". Elfman had wanted to work with Fraser since she first saw him in Encino Man. She revealed that her character Kate was a parody of James Bond and Indiana Jones. Kate was also a caricature of Quest for Camelot producer Dalisa Cooper Cohen. Martin's character Mr. Chairman was originally written as a "kind of straight arrow corporate villain", but he had an idea for the character to have a "super nerd" appearance and costume inspired by Bill Gates. Matthew Lillard and Jeff Gordon make cameo appearances in the film as themselves; Lillard appears interacting with Scooby-Doo and Shaggy Rogers, the latter of whom criticizes Lillard for his portrayal of the character in the 2002 live-action film, and Gordon appears in the Las Vegas scene, where Yosemite Sam, Nasty Canasta and Cottontail Smith steal his #24 DuPont Chevrolet Monte Carlo. Roger Corman and Mary Mitchell make cameo appearances as a movie director and script supervisor, respectively. John Cleese was planned to make a cameo appearance in the Paris scene, but the said cameo was cut. Britney Spears was considered to make a cameo appearance.

Goldberg produced an early animation test for the film, with Greg Burson voicing Bugs Bunny and Daffy Duck. For the film itself, Billy West and Jeff Bennett were originally cast as Bugs and Daffy, but were replaced by Joe Alaskey. Alaskey re-recorded the characters' lines, save for some vocal effects like Bugs' screaming and Daffy's "woo-hoos", and one line for Bugs which was done by Goldberg. He also provided the voices of Sylvester, Beaky Buzzard and Harrietta Bear. Despite the recast, West was kept in the role of Elmer Fudd. Bob Bergen was cast as Porky Pig and Tweety. Due to creative differences with Doyle, he quit production, but was told by his agent that he had been fired. Doyle would later be fired from production (and later parodied as "Harry Vermin" in the Duck Dodgers episode "Hooray for Hollywood Planet"), and Bergen was later asked to return to work on the film. Bergen recorded Tweety's lines, before they were re-recorded by Goldberg. Goldberg also provided the voices of Speedy Gonzales and Marvin the Martian. Maurice LaMarche recorded lines for Yosemite Sam, but his voice was weak from a previous project, so he was replaced with Bennett. At one point during production, Fraser did an imitation of the Tasmanian Devil, and was allowed to provide the character's voice. He also voiced the Tasmanian She-Devil.

=== Filming ===
On the film, Dante explained, "It's a gagfest. Not having a particularly strong story, it just goes from gag to gag and location to location. It's not a particularly compelling narrative, but, of course, that's not where the charm of the movie is supposed to lie." On the subject of filming, Dante stated that each scene with animated characters would be shot three times; first a rehearsal with fake stuffed stand-in puppets, then with nothing in the frame, and lastly, with a "mirror ball" in the shot to indicate to the computers where the light sources were. Fraser found filming with the puppets easier as an actor. The puppets were originally designed by Pete Brooke, Phil Jackson and David Barclay at Jim Henson's Creature Shop. The puppets proved too large to use as reference for the characters, so Barclay rebuilt and re-sized them under Warner Bros.' supervision and independent of the Creature Shop. He and Bruce Lanoil operated the puppets and provided scratch track voices. Afterwards, the animators would begin working and put the characters in the frame.

According to Dante, a "problem" occurred when Warner Bros. executives grew tired of the film's jokes and wanted them to be changed, so the studio brought in 25 gag writers (including John Requa, Glenn Ficarra Roger S. H. Schulman, David X. Cohen, Adam Resnick, and Ed Solomon) to try writing jokes that were short enough for the voice actors to dub into an animated character's mouth. Despite this, the film has one credited writer. Characters such as Gossamer, Ralph Phillips, Hugo the Abominable Snowman, Blacque Jacque Shellacque, Droopy, Superman (in his design from the 1940s Fleisher Studios cartoons) and Blossom, Bubbles, and Buttercup were planned to make cameo appearances in the film; Droopy would make a cameo appearance in a comic book adaptation of the film. The robot dog, animated in computer-generated imagery, was added to the film's finale by the studio to give it some more action and drama. Dante and Goldberg redesigned the dog to have him resemble Jones' style.

Dante stated that he had no creative freedom on the project, and called it "the longest year and a half of my life". Dante felt that while he and Goldberg managed to preserve the original personalities of the characters, the opening, middle and end of the film were different from what Dante had envisioned.

== Release ==
=== Home media ===
Warner Home Video released Looney Tunes: Back in Action on VHS and DVD on March 2, 2004. The film was re-released on DVD in separate widescreen (2.35:1) and full screen (1.33:1) editions on September 7, 2010. It was also released on Blu-ray with bonus features on December 2, 2014. A double DVD and Blu-ray release, paired with Space Jam, was released on June 7, 2016.

== Reception ==
=== Box office ===
Looney Tunes: Back in Action was planned to be released in the summer of 2003, but was pushed to November 14. Upon release, the film was considered a box-office bomb, grossing $68.5 million worldwide against a budget of $80 million.

Warner Bros. was hoping to start a revitalized franchise of Looney Tunes media and products with the financial success of Back in Action. New animated shorts and a Duck Dodgers TV series were commissioned to tie-in with Back in Action. However, due to the film's financial failure, the Looney Tunes franchise remained primarily on television for nearly two decades. Warner Bros. would not produce another theatrical Looney Tunes film until Space Jam: A New Legacy, which was released in 2021.

=== Critical response ===
On review aggregator Rotten Tomatoes the film holds an approval rating of 57% based on 134 reviews, with an average rating of 6.1/10. The website's critics consensus reads: "The plot is a nonsensical, hyperactive jumble and the gags are relatively uninspired compared to the classic Looney Tunes cartoons." At Metacritic, the film has a weighted average score a 64 out of 100, based on 32 critics, indicating "generally favorable reviews". Audiences polled by CinemaScore gave the film an average grade of "B+" on an A+ to F scale.

Chicago Sun-Times critics Roger Ebert and Richard Roeper gave the film "Two Thumbs Up"; Roeper called it a "cheerful and self-referential romp blending animation with live action in a non-stop quest for silly laughs", while Ebert called it "goofy fun".

=== Awards and accolades ===
The film was nominated for a Saturn Award for Best Animated Film, an Annie Award for Best Animated Feature and a Satellite Award for Best Animated or Mixed Media Feature.

== Music ==
This was the final film scored by Dante's collaborator Jerry Goldsmith. Due to Goldsmith's failing health, the music in the last reel of the film was composed by John Debney, though Goldsmith was the only credited composer in marketing materials and the Varèse Sarabande soundtrack album only contains Goldsmith's music (although the first and last cues are adaptations of compositions heard in Warner Bros. cartoons). Debney received an "Additional Music by" credit in the closing titles of the film and "Special Thanks" in the soundtrack album credits. Goldsmith died in July 2004, eight months after the film's release.

== Video games ==
Looney Tunes: Back in Action has a tie-in platform video game of the same name which was developed by Warthog Games and published by Electronic Arts for PlayStation 2, GameCube and Game Boy Advance. Xbox and Microsoft Windows versions of the video game were planned, but were cancelled because of the financial failure of the film.

A racing game based on the film, titled Looney Tunes: Back in Action: Zaney Race, was developed and published for mobile devices by Warner Bros. Interactive. It received a negative review by IGN, who criticized the game for its graphics and controls, and gave the game a rating of 0.5 out of 10, making it the lowest rated title on their website.
