= Eric Goldberg (animator) =

American animator (born 1955)

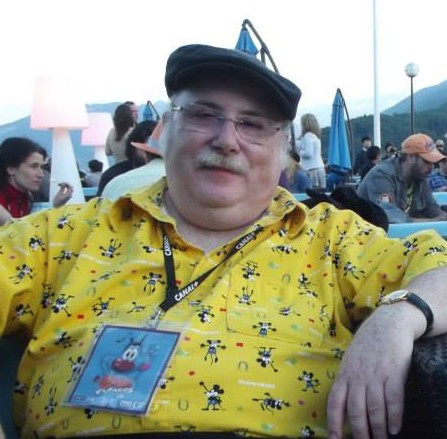
- Goldberg at the 2013 Annecy International Animated Film Festival
- Born: Eric Allen Goldberg; May 1, 1955 (age 71); Levittown, Pennsylvania, U.S.
- Occupations: Animator; voice actor; film director; producer
- Years active: 1973–present
- Employers: Richard Williams Productions (1977–92); MPL Communications (1984); Walt Disney Animation Studios (1992–present); Chuck Jones Enterprises (1993-97); 20th Century Fox (1993; 1997; 2004–06); Warner Bros. Animation (1994–2011); Dedica Group (2006); Picnic Pictures (2007–09)
- Spouse: Susan Goldberg (m. 1982)
- Awards: Annie Award, 1993, 2000, 2010; NCS Division Award, 2000; Winsor McCay Award, 2011

Eric Allen Goldberg (born May 1, 1955) is an American animator, voice actor, film director, and producer. He is known for his work at Walt Disney Animation Studios and Warner Bros. Animation.

== Life and career ==
Goldberg was born and raised in Levittown, Pennsylvania, and moved to Cherry Hill, New Jersey as a child, where he attended Cherry Hill High School East. Goldberg later studied at Pratt Institute, where he majored in illustration. He first entered the industry in the mid-1970s working on Raggedy Ann & Andy: A Musical Adventure for the Richard Williams studio, eventually moving to Williams' London studio and rising through the ranks from assistant to director. During the 1980s, Goldberg started his own London-based studio, Pizazz Pictures, to produce television commercials.

In 1982, Goldberg married his longtime girlfriend Susan.

Later, Goldberg closed his studio to work at Disney Animation Studios, Burbank, California, animating for the film Aladdin. He became the lead animator of the character Genie, and later the lead animator for Phil in Hercules (1997). Goldberg also was one of the directors of Disney's 1995 feature Pocahontas. During his time as the lead animator for the Genie, he also provided the majority of the original animation for MC Skat Kat's "Big Time" music video, which was finished in 1992 but left unaired.

In December 1998, Goldberg began plans to produce an animated short set to the music of George Gershwin's Rhapsody in Blue. His film eventually became part of Disney's Fantasia 2000 after Goldberg was allowed to use the Disney staff to complete the film during a production hiatus. He also served as director for Fantasia 2000's "The Carnival of the Animals" segment. Goldberg's wife Susan served as art director on both segments.

Goldberg served as the director of animation for Warner Bros.' 2003 live-action/animation hybrid feature Looney Tunes: Back in Action, and also provided the voices of Bugs Bunny (one line), Marvin the Martian, Tweety, and Speedy Gonzales. Although the film was not commercially successful at the box office, it was met with relatively positive reviews from film critics, and Goldberg was nominated for an Annie Award for Outstanding Directing in an Animated Feature Production for his animation direction. He animated the title sequence of Metro-Goldwyn-Mayer's 2006 remake of The Pink Panther, with Bob Kurtz of Kurtz and Friends, and provided some additional animation for Fat Albert. Goldberg was offered to direct an animated opening sequence for Wes Craven’s Cursed, but Goldberg declined twice. He was also attached to direct a CG adaptation of Where The Wild Things Are at Universal Pictures, but due to creative differences, Goldberg left the project & Universal decided to make it a live-action adaptation directed by Spike Jonze.

In 2006, Goldberg returned to Disney, where he directed four minutes of animation for the Epcot attraction Gran Fiesta Tour Starring The Three Caballeros and contributed to the 2007 animated short How to Hook Up Your Home Theater, which starred Goofy. Most recently, he was the supervising animator for Louis in The Princess and the Frog (2009), Rabbit in Winnie the Pooh (2011), and Maui's tattoos in Moana (2016).

Goldberg has also animated Mickey Mouse on Nighttime Spectaculars in Disney Parks and Resorts, including Disney Gifts of Christmas and Celebrate! Tokyo Disneyland in Tokyo Disneyland, and the "We Love Mickey" Main Street Projection Show in Hong Kong Disneyland.

In April 2022, Goldberg confirmed plans within the Disney studio to once again return to hand-drawn animation.

In August 2024, Goldberg wrote and directed the Donald Duck episode of the internet series Hot Ones.

== Preservation ==
Two of Goldberg's early films, For Sale and Good Old Fashioned Cartoon Violence, were preserved by the Academy Film Archive in 2012.

== Awards ==
- 1993 Annie Award Outstanding Individual Achievement in the Field of Animation
- 2000 Annie Award Outstanding Individual Achievement for Character Animation for Fantasia 2000
- 2000 NCS Division Award Feature Animation for Rhapsody in Blue
- 2010 Annie Award Character Animation in a Feature Production for The Princess and the Frog
- 2010 Winsor McCay Award for lifetime achievement in animation.
- 2026 Disney Legend Award, the highest honor bestowed by The Walt Disney Company.

== Filmography ==
Year	Film	Director	Animator	Voice actor	Voice Role	Animation Role	Notes
1973	For Sale	Yes	Yes	No	No	No	
1973	Good Old Fashioned Cartoon Violence	Yes	Yes	No	No	No	
1977	Raggedy Ann & Andy: A Musical Adventure	No	Yes	No	No	No	Assistant Animator
1982	Ziggy's Gift	No	Yes	No	No	No	art director
1985	Rupert and the Frog Song	No	Yes	No	No	No	
1992	Aladdin	No	Yes	No	No	No	Character Designer/Supervising Animator Genie
1993	The Thief and the Cobbler	No	Yes	No	No	No	On Mad Witch And Death Machine Sequences; Uncredited
1993	Mrs. Doubtfire	No	Yes	No	No	No	Daniel Hillard (Robin Williams) Voice Acting Sequence Animator (As Claude Raynes), Along With Chuck Jones
1994	Chariots of Fur	No	Yes	No	No	No	As Claude Raynes
1995	Pocahontas	Yes	No	No	No	No	
1996	Superior Duck	No	No	Yes	No	No	As Claude Raynes: Tweety, Marvin the Martian, Porky Pig, Superman
1997	Hercules	No	Yes	No	No	No	Supervising Animator Phil
1997	Pullet Surprise	No	Yes	No	No	No	Additional Animator As Claude Raynes
1997	From Hare to Eternity	No	Yes	No	No	No	As Claude Raynes
2000	Fantasia 2000	Yes	No	No	No	No	Rhapsody in Blue
2000	Fantasia 2000	Yes	Yes	No	No	No	The Carnival of The Animals, Finale
2000	Dinosaur	No	Yes	No	No	No	Additional Visual Development
2001	The Magic Lamp 3D	Yes	No	No	No	No	
2003	Looney Tunes: Back in Action	No	Yes	Yes	Yes	No	Storyboard Artist and (Animation Director) Bugs Bunny, Tweety, Marvin the Martian, Speedy Gonzales
2003	Boys Night Out	No	Yes	No	No	No	Additional animation
2004	Green Screen Show	No	Yes	No	No	No	
2004	Fat Albert	No	Yes	No	No	No	
2005	Son of the Mask	No	Yes	No	No	No	Animated Dream Sequence
2005	Tom and Jerry: The Fast and the Furry	No	Yes	No	No	No	Character Layout
2006	Pink Panther	No	Yes	No	No	No	Title Sequence
2006	A Monkey's Tale	Yes	No	No	No	No	
2006	Tom and Jerry Tales	No	Yes	No	No	No	TV series Opening Titles
2006	The Fox and the Hound 2	No	Yes	No	No	No	Direct-to-video
2007	The Chestnut Tree	No	No	No	No	No	Special Thanks
2007	Gran Fiesta Tour Starring The Three Caballeros	No	Yes	No	No	No	Short film Theme Park
2007	How to Hook Up Your Home Theater	No	Yes	No	No	No	Short film
2008	Warner Bros. Home Entertainment Academy Awards Animation Collection	No	No	Yes	No	No	Audio Commentaries On The Cat Concerto, The Dot and the Line And Blitz Wolf
2009	Pups of Liberty	No	Yes	Yes	No	No	Lead Animator; Governor
2009	The Princess and the Frog	No	Yes	No	No	No	Character Designer/Supervising Animator for Louis the Alligator And Miscellaneous Characters.
2010	The 82nd Annual Academy Awards	No	Yes	No	No	No	Archive Footage;Louis the Alligator
2010	Iron Man 2	No	No	Yes	Yes	No	Video game; A.I.M. soldiers
2011	Winnie the Pooh	No	Yes	No	No	Yes	Supervising Animator; Rabbit, The Backson
2011	Tom and Jerry: Golden Collection, Volume One	No	No	No	No	No	Audio Commentary on The Cat Concerto (Archival Recording On Disc Two)
2012	Paperman	No	Yes	No	No	No	Final Line Animator/Academy Award Winning Short
2012	Wreck-It Ralph	No	Yes	No	No	No	Additional Visual Development
2013	Get a Horse!	No	Yes	No	No	No	Head of Animation/Short Film
2016	The Simpsons	Yes	Yes	No	No	No	Couch gag for Fland Canyon
2016	Moana	No	Yes	No	No	Yes	Hand-Drawn Animation Supervisor Maui (Tattoos)
2018	Ralph Breaks the Internet	No	Yes	No	No	No	Additional Animator
2021	How to Stay at Home	Yes	Yes	No	No	Yes	Supervising Animator On "How To Wear A Mask"; Goofy and Writer
2022	Mickey in a Minute	No	Yes	No	No	Yes	Animated short Ahead of The Documentary Mickey: The Story of a Mouse:
2022	Oswald The Lucky Rabbit	Yes	Yes	No	No	Yes	Animated Web Short, Also Producer; Oswald the Lucky Rabbit
2023	Once Upon a Studio	No	Yes	Yes	No	Yes	Head of hand-drawn animation; Mickey Mouse, Genie, Cheshire Cat, Mad Hatter, Jiminy Cricket
2023	Wish	No	Yes	No	No	No	Additional 2D Animation
2024	Moana 2	No	Yes	No	No	No	Hand-Drawn animation supervisor Maui (Tattoos)
2025	Zootopia 2	No	Yes	No	No	No	Additional 2D Animation
