= Marvin the Martian =

Warner Bros. theatrical cartoon character

- Looney Tunes/Merrie Melodies character
- First appearance: Haredevil Hare (July 24, 1948; 78 years ago)
- Created by: Chuck Jones
- Voiced by: Mel Blanc (1948–1986); Joe Alaskey (1991–2008); Rob Paulsen (1992); Neil Ross (1993–1994; 1998); Hal Rayle (1993–1994); Maurice LaMarche (1993); Greg Burson (1994–1995); Eric Goldberg (1996, 2003); Bob Bergen (1996, 2012); Jeff Bergman (1998); Sam Vincent (Baby Looney Tunes; 2002); Eric Bauza (2011–2026); Damon Jones (2011–2015); (see below)

In-universe information
- Alias: Marvin Martian
- Species: Martian
- Gender: Male
- Family: Marcia (niece)
- Home: Mars
- Pets: K-9 (alien dog)

Marvin the Martian is a cartoon character from the Looney Tunes and Merrie Melodies series. He frequently appears as an anthropomorphic martian extraterrestrial villain in cartoons and video games, and wears a Roman soldier's helmet and skirt. The character has been voiced by Mel Blanc, Joe Alaskey, Bob Bergen, and Eric Bauza, among others.

The character first appeared as an antagonist in the 1948 Bugs Bunny cartoon Haredevil Hare. He went on to appear in four more cartoons produced between 1952 and 1963.

== Conception and creation ==
Marvin's design was based on the Hoplite style of armor, often worn in depictions of the Roman god Mars. "That was the uniform that Mars wore — that helmet and skirt. We thought putting it on this ant-like creature might be funny. But since he had no mouth, we had to convey that he was speaking totally through his movements. It demanded a kind of expressive body mechanics."

Marvin was never named in the original shorts — he was referred to as the Commander of Flying Saucer X-2 in The Hasty Hare in 1952, and sometimes referred to as "Antwerp" in promotional material or other projects like the live stage show version of Bugs Bunny in Space. However, in 1979, once the character attracted merchandising interest, the name "Marvin" was selected for The Bugs Bunny/Road Runner Movie.

Marvin appeared in five theatrical cartoons from 1948 to 1963:

- Haredevil Hare (1948)
- The Hasty Hare (1952)
- Duck Dodgers in the 24½th Century (1953)
- Hare-Way to the Stars (1958)
- Mad as a Mars Hare (1963)

== History ==
Marvin hails from the planet Mars, but is often found elsewhere. He is often accompanied by his dog "K-9", and sometimes by other creatures: One gag, first used in Hare-Way to the Stars (1958), involved candy-sized "Instant Martians" that become full-size upon addition of drops of water.

Marvin wears a Roman soldier's uniform, with basketball shoes resembling the Chuck Taylor All-Stars brand. The helmet and skirt that he wears are green and his suit is red (in a few of the original shorts, his suit was green and the helmet and skirt golden). His head is a black sphere with only eyes for features. The curved crest of his helmet appears, with the push-broom-like upper section, to comically resemble the helm of an ancient Greek hoplite, or the galea of a Roman centurion. The appearance of the combination of Marvin's head and helmet led to Bugs Bunny referring to him as a "bowling ball wearing a spittoon" in one short. Marvin speaks with a soft, nasally voice, and often speaks technobabble. He is also known for his trademark quotes "Where's the kaboom? There was supposed to be an Earth-shattering kaboom!", "Isn't that lovely?", and "This makes me very angry, very angry indeed." (which is usually followed by him huffing and puffing). His voice sounds similar to the one used for Claude Cat.

Marvin the Martian's flag of Mars in Duck Dodgers in the 24½th Century.

On numerous occasions, Marvin has tried to destroy the Earth with his "Illudium Q-36 Explosive Space Modulator" (sometimes pronounced "Illudium Pu-36" or "Uranium Pu-36"). The original reference to "Uranium Pu-36" was changed to "Illudium PU-36" in subsequent cartoons. The "Pu" is a reference to plutonium. Marvin always laboriously over-pronounces the name of the device, which resembles a stick of dynamite, in order to avoid any possibility of confusing it with some other similar form of explosive technology. Marvin attempts to destroy the Earth because, he reasons, "it obstructs my view of Venus"; he has been trying to destroy the Earth for more than two millennia, suggesting that members of his species, and possibly Martian creatures in general, have extremely long lifespans. Marvin is consistently foiled by Bugs Bunny. He has battled for space territory, Planet X, with Daffy Duck, a.k.a. Duck Dodgers in the 24½th Century.

=== Later appearances ===
Marvin appeared in Duck Dodgers and the Return of the 24½th Century, with Gossamer, a hairy red monster, as his assistant. He made a cameo appearance in the ending scene of the 1988 Disney film Who Framed Roger Rabbit, set in 1947, even though his first cartoon appearance was during the following year.

He has appeared in three animated shows — as a toddler in Baby Looney Tunes, as a primary antagonist in the Duck Dodgers television series and as a supporting character in The Looney Tunes Show.

- In Baby Looney Tunes, Baby Marvin shares a lot of similarities with his adult counterpart. His helmet, however, sports a propeller rather than a push-broom. Also, his shoes are smaller in proportion. He appears in the episode entitled "War of the Weirds" as a visitor to Granny's house. Throughout most of the episode, he is nonverbal as he is too shy to talk to the babies; he fidgets and mumbles when Baby Bugs and Baby Taz try to talk to him. He tries to make friends, but he is shunned and ridiculed by the babies (except for Baby Taz) for being "weird". The babies still shun and play tricks on him, until he cries. Baby Taz courageously befriends him and speaks on his behalf. He fixes Baby Bugs' broken toy rocket and is able to talk when Baby Bugs offered to play his toy. The babies feel guilty for being unfriendly and they eventually befriend him. He is mainly featured in the song Oh Where Has My Martian Gone? (based on the children's song "Oh Where Has My Little Dog Gone?"), and made appearances in a few other music videos.
- In Duck Dodgers, he is a Martian commander in service of the Martian Queen Tyr'ahnee. This show reused his original name from The Hasty Hare (although the opening credits list him as Marvin playing Commander X-2, in the same way as Daffy is playing Duck Dodgers).
- Marvin the Martian appears in The Looney Tunes Show episode "Reunion" and appeared in the "Merrie Melodies" short "I'm a Martian", voiced by Eric Bauza. Here, he is described as a former classmate of Daffy's who has been plotting to destroy Earth since graduation. The episode also has a flashback, in which it is revealed that the yellow headdress on the top of his helmet is actually his hair, showing that in high school (before he started wearing the helmet) he kept it down.

Over a decade prior to any of these, he guest-starred in a Tiny Toon Adventures segment titled "Duck Dodgers Jr.", where he was accompanied by an apprentice named Marcia the Martian.

He was also in a Taz-Mania episode "The Man from M.A.R.S." and had a cameo appearance in The Sylvester and Tweety Mysteries ("What's the Frequency, Kitty?").

Marvin also made cameo appearances in the Animaniacs cartoons "Cat on a Hot Steel Beam" (when Buttons reaches the moon; the short also featured Pussyfoot) and "Space-Probed". Some infant martians resembling (and sounding like) Marvin appear at the end of "Clown and Out". He later briefly appears in the Pinky and the Brain episode "Star Warners", where he is shown on a date with Minerva Mink, with K-9 sleeping next to them. He also appeared in the 2020 reboot series episode "Suffragette City".

Cartoon Network also created a 2-minute filler piece featuring Marvin, named "Mars Forever" by Fantastic Plastic Machine. It is a disco-style video combining clips of Marvin and Bugs Bunny from their encounters in Haredevil Hare and Hare-Way to the Stars, as well as bits of Duck Dodgers in the 24½th Century and Rocket-Bye Baby.

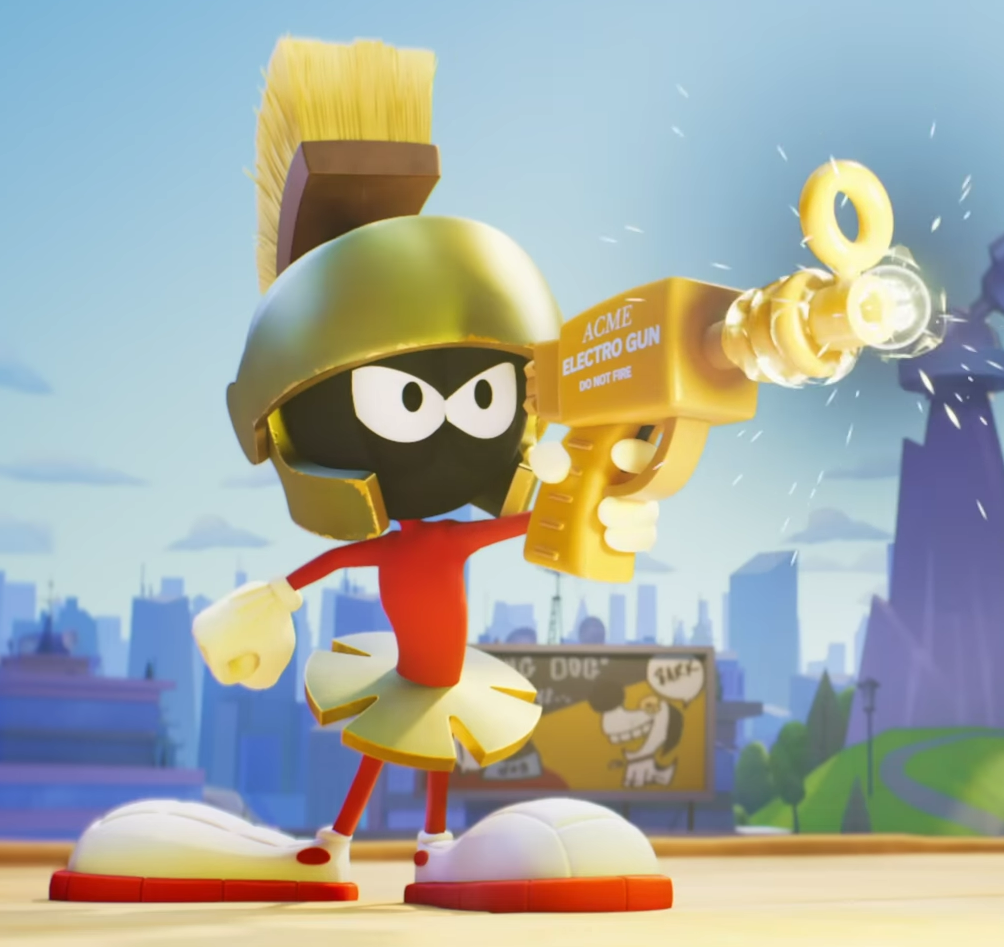
A 3D rendition of Marvin in MultiVersus

Marvin has also appeared in a number of video games. He served as the main antagonist in the Genesis video games Taz in Escape from Mars and Bugs Bunny in Double Trouble, the Super NES game Daffy Duck: The Marvin Missions, and the Game Boy Color game Looney Tunes Collector: Alert!. He also appeared in Bugs Bunny: Lost in Time for the PlayStation where he was the boss of Dimension X, and in the final level of Sheep, Dog, 'n' Wolf. He is also a recurring enemy in the Quantum Beep stages of Road Runner's Death Valley Rally for Super NES. He also was an enemy in Looney Tunes: Back in Action. He is also a playable character in Looney Tunes: Space Race, Looney Tunes: Marvin Strikes Back! Looney Tunes: Acme Arsenal, and MultiVersus. In MultiVersus, he is a projectile based character who uses his rayguns and a Martian ship that fires rockets.

Marvin appeared in a 1993 Nike commercial as the antagonist who had stolen all of the Earth's supply of Michael Jordan Air Jordan sneakers. Both Bugs Bunny and Michael Jordan defeat him and his instant Martians to reclaim the shoes. The Nike commercials inspired the 1996 film Space Jam, in which Marvin was cast as the referee (though he did not stay to referee the whole game due to Bupkus beating him up). He later had a major role in the 2003 film Looney Tunes: Back in Action, where he was hired by the ACME chairman (Steve Martin), to finish DJ (Brendan Fraser) and the gang at Area 52. In the film's climax, he reappears to bring the Blue Monkey diamond to the ACME satellite, but is thwarted by Bugs (who he duels in a parody of Obi-Wan Kenobi and Jango Fett in Star Wars: Episode II – Attack of the Clones) and Daffy (who arrives as Duck Dodgers to save Bugs after he is exhausted from the battle).

From 2000 to 2001, Marvin appeared in a series of 3D-animated "webisode" shorts created with Pulse 3D at Pulse Entertainment. The shorts were animated by Blake Porch, Ed Gregor, Fred Cabral, Michael Shahan, Erik Morgansen, Letia Lewis, and Geerte Frenken, with sound design by Peter Stone.

Marvin appeared in the 2006 Looney Tunes version of A Christmas Carol, Bah, Humduck! A Looney Tunes Christmas as an employee at Daffy Duck's "Lucky Duck Super Store". Marvin was homesick for his planet, Mars, and wanted to go back for Christmas (but also mentions that he is planning to destroy the Earth as well). At first, Daffy does not let him take Christmas off, since he expects the employees to work on Christmas Day. After being visited by the abrasive yet well-intentioned Christmas ghosts, Daffy is redeemed, and as part of a surprise Christmas celebration, gives Marvin a rocket that will go faster than the speed of light, allowing him to make it to Mars by yesterday.

Marvin is the main antagonist in Looney Tunes: Rabbits Run. In the film, he plots to turn the Earth invisible and sends his henchman Cecil Turtle (who posed as a government agent) and a pair of disguised Instant Martians to get Lola Bunny's perfume which is able to turn anything invisible. However, his plan is fooled by Bugs Bunny, who gets Marvin to accidentally destroy his lair (and Mars as a whole).

Marvin made brief cameos in the 2003–2007 CN Fridays intro from 2003 to 2007, and a MetLife commercial that aired during the 2012 Super Bowl.

Marvin's descendant Melvin (voiced by Joe Alaskey) appeared as a one-time antagonist in Loonatics Unleashed.

Marvin appeared on Mad in a "MAD News" segment, letting his sink run water on Mars. He and K-9 later appeared in the segment "Yawn Carter", where they greet John Carter on Mars.

In the Young Justice episode "Secrets," Miss Martian takes on the form of a gigantic Marvin the Martian to scare Marvin White, who is committing a War of the Worlds-style prank.

Marvin appears as a player's avatar in Steven Spielberg's 2018 film Ready Player One.

Marvin is a minor character in the 2021 film Space Jam: A New Legacy, voiced by Eric Bauza, where he appears alongside K-9 after Bugs claims Tune World in the name of the Earth. Marvin arrives to claim Tune World in the name of Mars, though Bugs tricks him into thinking that Tune World is in the clear. Bugs hijacks Marvin's ship and retreats with LeBron James to find the other Tunes. A recurring gag is that Marvin gets knocked out by the hatch of his ship every time he regains consciousness.

Marvin appears in the preschool series Bugs Bunny Builders, starting in the episode "Blast Off".

Marvin was planned to make a cameo appearance in the 2026 film Coyote vs. Acme as part of a visual gag in the courtroom scene, but was later deleted from the final film. The final version of the film featured the Tasmanian Devil. While he does not physically appear anywhere in the film, Marvin appears on an ACME television monitor via stock footage from Hare-Way to the Stars.

In nearly all of his appearances, Marvin is shown using a raygun that fires either bubbles of pliable plastic or energy beams.

== Cancelled film adaptation ==
On July 29, 2008, Warner Bros. and Alcon Entertainment announced plans for a live action/animated film starring Mike Myers as the voice of Marvin and Christopher Lee as Santa Claus. The film would have involved Marvin trying to destroy the Earth during Christmas by becoming a competitor of Santa Claus but being prevented from accomplishing his goal when Santa wraps him inside a gift box. Alcon compared the project to other films such as Racing Stripes and My Dog Skip. It was initially scheduled for an October 7, 2011 release, but the movie was later taken off the schedule and no word on it has been heard since. Test footage of the film and the Eddie Murphy vehicle Hong Kong Phooey was leaked on December 28, 2012.

== Voice actors ==
- Mel Blanc (1948–1986)
- Rob Sherwood (The Further Adventures of Marvin the Martian)
- Joe Alaskey (Tiny Toon Adventures, Bugs Bunny's Lunar Tunes, Another Froggy Evening, Marvin the Martian In the Third Dimension, Bugs & Friends Sing Elvis, The Sylvester & Tweety Mysteries, Crash! Bang! Boom! The Best of WB Sound FX, Tweety's High-Flying Adventure, Mysterious Phenomena of the Unexplained, Duck Dodgers, Bah, Humduck! A Looney Tunes Christmas, various video games and commercials)
- Rob Paulsen (Taz-Mania)
- Neil Ross (Nike commercial, Six Flags Great Adventure commercial, Six Flags AstroWorld commercial, Pinky and the Brain)
- Hal Rayle (Nike commercial)
- Maurice LaMarche (Animaniacs)
- Greg Burson (Bugs Bunny: Rabbit Rampage, Acme Animation Factory, The Bugs Bunny Wacky World Games, Looney Tunes B-Ball)
- Keith Scott (Tazos Looney Tunes commercial, Westfield commercial, Looney Tunes LIVE! Classroom Capers, The Looney Tunes Radio Show, Looney Rock, Looney Tunes Christmas Carols)
- Bob Bergen (Space Jam, Rover Finds Life On Mars)
- Eric Goldberg (Superior Duck, Looney Tunes: Back in Action)
- Harry Shearer (The Simpsons)
- Jeff Bergman (Pride of the Martians)
- Samuel Vincent (Baby Looney Tunes)
- Billy West (A Looney Tunes Sing-A-Long Christmas)
- James Arnold Taylor (Drawn Together)
- Eric Bauza (The Looney Tunes Show, Yule Be Sorry, Looney Tunes Dash, Nike commercial, New Looney Tunes, Converse commercials, Ani-Mayhem, Looney Tunes: World of Mayhem, Walmart commercial, Looney Tunes Cartoons, Bugs Bunny in The Golden Carrot, Space Jam: A New Legacy, Bugs and Daffy's Thanksgiving Road Trip, MultiVersus, Bugs Bunny Builders, Looney Tunes pinball machine, Tiny Toons Looniversity, Looney Tunes: Wacky World of Sports)
- Damon Jones (singing voice in The Looney Tunes Show, speaking voice in Looney Tunes: Rabbits Run)
- Hugh Davidson (Mad)
- Kevin Shinick (Mad)

== In popular culture ==
The launch patch for the Spirit Mars Rover, featuring Marvin the Martian

An early cover art proposal for Big Black's 1986 Atomizer album, eventually discarded due to legal problems, included Marvin pointing a raygun at the Earth.

In Peter David's 1991 Star Trek novel The Rift, the Calligarians have a device called "The Illidium Pew-36 Explosive Space Modulator", a direct reference to Marvin's Earth-shattering device.

Phish guitarist Trey Anastasio frequently wore a Marvin the Martian T-shirt onstage between 1993 and 1997.

Marvin appears in the FBI lineup with other TV aliens in "The Springfield Files", an episode of The Simpsons, wearing a purple helmet and skirt. (Note: Attributed to multiple references:) He also appears in the episode "Love Is a Many-Splintered Thing" where he was shown in a fighting video game, Mixed Martian Arts.

NHL Buffalo Sabres Goalie Patrick Lalime's goaltender mask features Marvin the Martian on the front. The use began during Lalime's tenure with the Ottawa Senators.

Marvin served as the mascot for the USCGC Hornbeam (WLB-394), a 180-foot United States Coast Guard buoy tender. His likeness appears in miniature on the Spirit rover on Mars as well as on the mission launch patch.

Marvin appears in the South Park episode "Imaginationland Episode III". Here, he marches among myriad other evil fictional characters to battle against the surviving good characters, along with an evil-eyed Gossamer and a rabid Wile E. Coyote.

The Illudium PU-36 explosive space modulator is referenced in several songs, including T-Pain's "Time Machine" and Ludacris's "Mouthing Off". Reach Records artist PRo referenced Marvin the Martian and the space modulator in his song "Mission to Mars" from his 2011 album Dying to Live. Xenia Rubinos's 2013 Magic Trix album cover features a naked person sitting in a chair with Marvin's head overlying theirs.

Marvin briefly appears in Diane Duane's 2010 novel A Wizard of Mars, when one of the main characters, Nita Callahan, gets caught in a spell that brings their stereotypes of Mars into existence. A figurine of Marvin appears floating on the space shuttle in the film Gravity.

In episode 302 of his podcast Dear Hank and John, Hank Green stated that when he was young, he would hack into early websites and add a small image of Marvin the Martian to the webpage as a prank.

== See also ==
- Category:Marvin the Martian films
