= Hare-Way to the Stars =

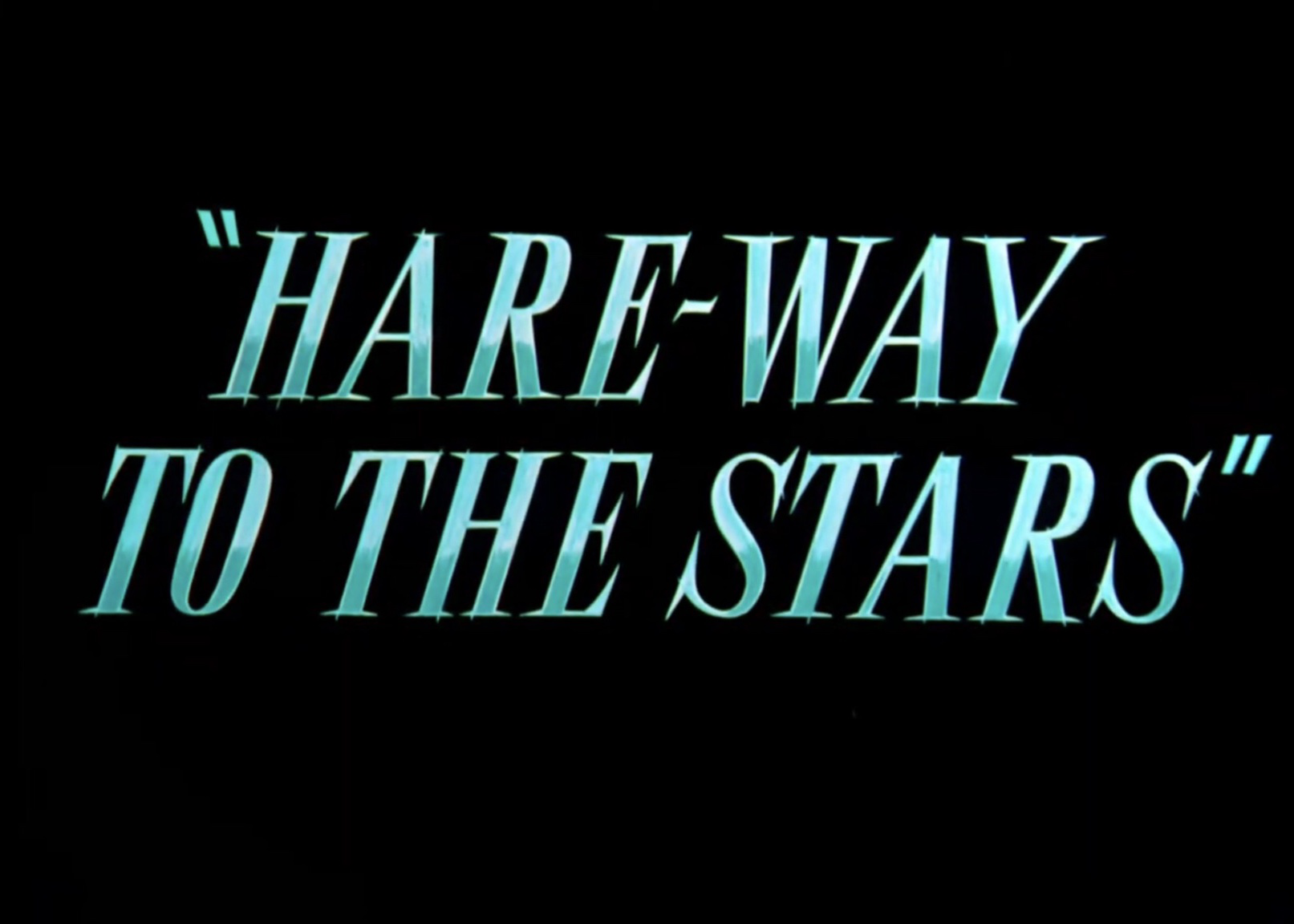
- Title card
- Directed by: Chuck Jones
- Story by: Michael Maltese
- Starring: Mel Blanc
- Edited by: Treg Brown
- Music by: Milt Franklyn
- Animation by: Richard Thompson; Ken Harris; Abe Levitow; Harry Love (special animation effects)
- Layouts by: Maurice Noble
- Backgrounds by: Philip De Guard
- Color process: Technicolor
- Production company: Warner Bros. Cartoons
- Distributed by: Warner Bros. Pictures; The Vitaphone Corporation
- Release date: March 29, 1958 (United States)
- Running time: 7 minutes
- Language: English

Hare-Way to the Stars is a 1958 American animated science fiction comedy short film directed by Chuck Jones and written by Michael Maltese. The short was released by Warner Bros. Pictures on March 29, 1958 as part of the Looney Tunes series, and stars Bugs Bunny and Marvin the Martian. The title is a play on the song "Stairway to the Stars".

== Plot ==
The cartoon starts when Bugs Bunny, hung over from mixing radish juice with carrot juice the night before, unknowingly climbs out of his hole and into a rocket ship that is about to be launched into space. He realizes what has happened once he screws open the tip of the ship, and is immediately hit by the satellite Sputnik and lands on what appears to be a space station. While there, Bugs meets Marvin the Martian, who is trying to blow up the Earth with his Illudium Q-36 Explosive Space Modulator (which resembles a stick of dynamite) because Earth obstructs his view of Venus.

Marvin lights the fuse, then Bugs quietly extinguishes it and steals the explosive. Marvin quickly discovers what has happened and says "Where's the kaboom? There was supposed to be an Earth-shattering kaboom!!!" He creates a trio of "Instant Martians" (who somewhat resemble the Martians of A Martian Odyssey and Jumpin' Jupiter) by adding water to "Instant Martian" pills. The Martians all leave to capture Bugs. Bugs gets on a rocket scooter and is pursued by a Martian. After noticing it mimics his every move to catch up with him, Bugs mimes driving out of the space station, causing the Martian to actually do that. He is then pursued by the Martians and hides behind a door so that he can chase them. The Martians use the same trick to get behind Bugs and chase him, but he uses the same trick again to make the Martians run into a trapdoor and make them fall out of the space station. Bugs then steals a UFO and when Marvin attempts to make more Martians, Bugs swaps the lit Space Modulator for the Instant Martian dispenser.

The Modulator explodes in Marvin's hand just after he finishes saying its name, destroying his space station. Standing amid the shattered remains, Marvin says it is "back to the old drawing board" for his plans to destroy the Earth. Bugs arrives on Earth in the UFO, but crashes into a construction site warning sign and finds himself and the bottle of "Instant Martians" falling into the sewer and splashing all the pills. The ground shakes as Bugs climbs out of the sewer, frantically replaces the manhole cover and warns the audience "Run for the hills, folks, or you'll be up to your armpits in Martians!", before proceeding to take his own advice as Martian antennas poke out of the cracks appearing in the ground.

== Crew ==
- Story: Michael Maltese
- Animation: Richard Thompson, Ken Harris & Abe Levitow
- Layouts: Maurice Noble
- Backgrounds: Philip DeGuard
- Effects Animation: Harry Love
- Film Editor: Treg Brown
- Voice Characterizations: Mel Blanc
- Music: Milt Franklyn
- Directed by Chuck Jones

== Home media ==
The cartoon was featured on the Looney Tunes Platinum Collection: Volume 1 Blu-ray box set (released November 15, 2011) with the cartoon restored and in high definition. This cartoon was also made part of the feature film The Bugs Bunny/Road Runner Movie (sometimes known as The Great American Chase).

Preceded by Hare-Less Wolf	Bugs Bunny Cartoons; 1958	Succeeded by Now Hare This
