= The Hasty Hare =

1952 film by Chuck Jones

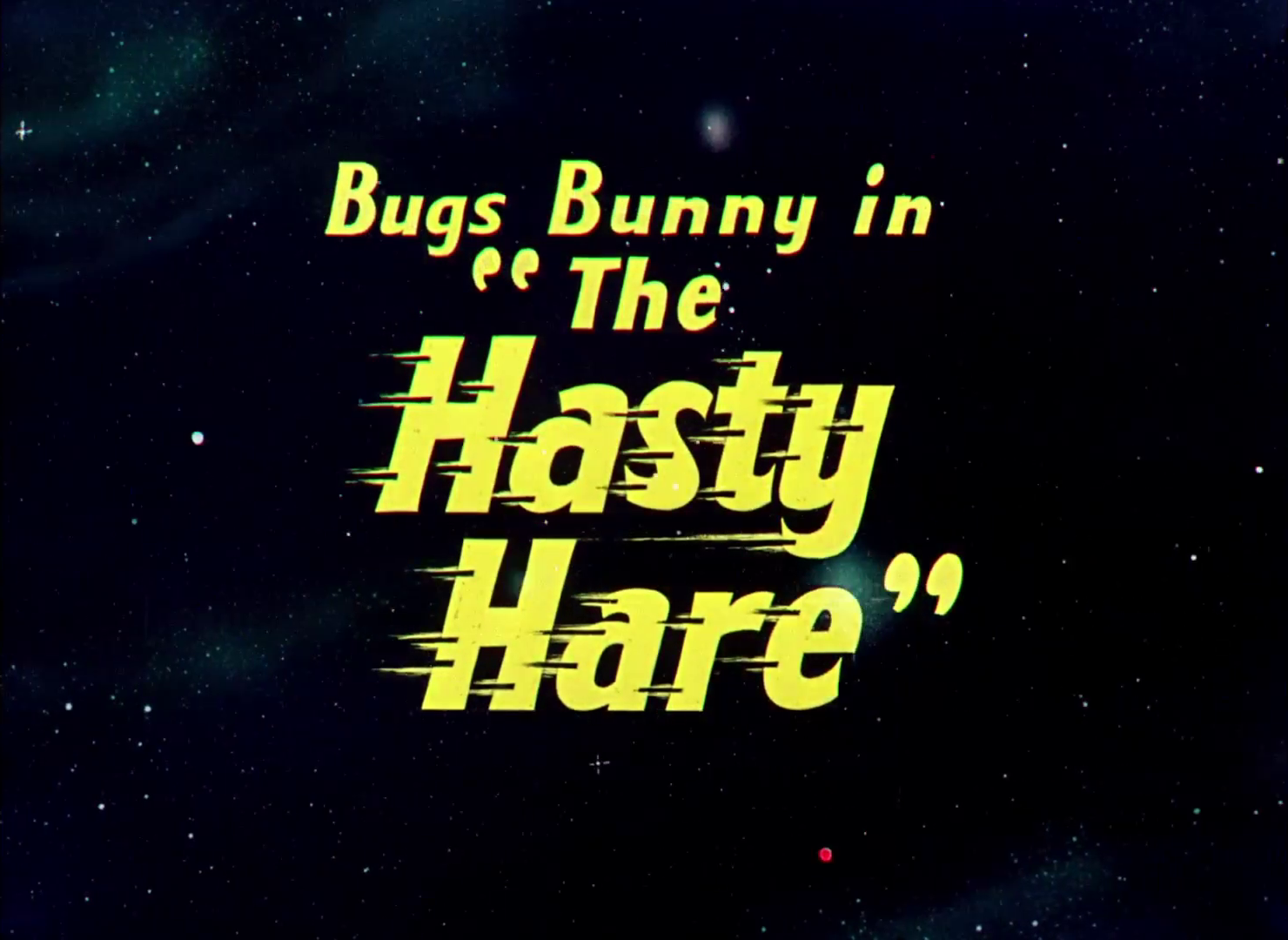
- Title card
- Directed by: Charles M. Jones
- Story by: Michael Maltese
- Starring: Mel Blanc
- Music by: Carl W. Stalling
- Animation by: Ken Harris; Lloyd Vaughan; Ben Washam
- Layouts by: Robert Gribbroek
- Backgrounds by: Philip DeGuard
- Color process: Technicolor
- Production company: Warner Bros. Cartoons
- Distributed by: Warner Bros. Pictures; The Vitaphone Corporation
- Release date: June 7, 1952 (USA)
- Running time: 7:33
- Language: English

The Hasty Hare is a 1952 Warner Bros. Looney Tunes cartoon directed by Chuck Jones. The short was released on June 7, 1952, and features Bugs Bunny and Marvin the Martian. The title is a pun on the film title The Hasty Heart.

== Plot ==
Marvin the Martian (here referred to as Commander of the X2 vessel) is traveling to Earth. Upon landing, he opens his assignment envelope - return one Earth creature back to Mars (signed by General E=mc²). With the help of his dog, K-9 (who "talks" to Marvin by handing him notes), he finds Bugs' rabbit hole. As the two observe the hole, they are pushed back when Bugs cleans out a bucket of carrot stems. Seeing their getup, Bugs assumes it must be Halloween, so he hands them each a bag of treats. Marvin then decides that he shall "have" to use force. He pulls out his disintegrating gun, and atomizes a large hole where the small rabbit hole used to be. Bugs shrieks "How Halloween-y can you get?" before seeing the flying saucer.

Marvin then tells Bugs that he is to come back to Mars with him. Bugs tries to act defiant, but goes slightly insane when Marvin uses his pistol against a nearby rock (which also disintegrates part of the ground under the rock). He quickly gets some bags and runs into the ship, then runs back out as a train conductor (a play on Mel Blanc's train conductor character on the Jack Benny show), telling Marvin and K-9 "Flying saucer, for Saturn, Neptune, Jupiter, Venus, the Dog Star and Mars now leaving on track five! All aboard!" Marvin and K-9 rush on the ship and fly off, then realize their mistake in midflight and fly back ("Oh! That wasn't a bit nice! [huff, puff] You have made me very angry, [huff, puff] very angry indeed!").

Bugs convinces Marvin that he wants to go to Mars, then insinuates that K-9 is plotting mutiny. Marvin calls K-9 over and nearly atomizes him, but K-9 pulls himself out of his helmet, asking what he did wrong (signed, "Anxious"). Bugs starts walking off, but Marvin and K-9 shoot him with an Acme straitjacket-ejecting bazooka.

On the ship, Marvin is piloting while K-9 watches over Bugs (labeled as "One over-confident Earth creature"). Bugs convinces K-9 to let him "try on something more sporty". Now out of the straitjacket, Bugs quickly ties K-9 up, then grabs another jacket and yells "Everybody desert ship! We've struck an iceberg and we're sinking fast! Here, get into this life preserver, quick!" as he wraps Marvin in the spare straitjacket.

Now with both of them tied up (labeled as "Two disgruntled Martians"), Bugs tries turning the ship back home. After a brief out-of-control spin, he starts to fly back, but has great difficulty steering the ship properly and desperately throws out an anchor to steady it. The anchor then snags a crescent moon, which in turn snags Saturn's rings, a large planet (presumably Jupiter) and other assorted stars. Back on Earth, a small man in an observatory looks into his telescope, only to see the spaceship and the planets directly in front of him. The man pauses in confusion, then proceeds to write a note, "I resign! When I begin to see things like this, it's time to take up turkey farming." Signed, I. Frisby (a reference to Friz Freleng, whose caricature was indeed used for the character) and leaves. Outside, Bugs asks Frisby if he knows where he can sell a "slightly used flying saucer — it's only got 3 billion miles on it." Frisby then starts to have a mental breakdown in a goofy matter as he walks off ("ICK! OOF! GICK, GACK! GEEK... GOBBUT!") causing Bugs with an annoyed look to ask the audience: "Huh, what's biting him?"

Preceded by Water, Water Every Hare	Bugs Bunny Cartoons; 1952	Succeeded by Oily Hare
