= Leghorn Swoggled =

- Directed by: Robert McKimson
- Story by: Warren Foster
- Starring: Mel Blanc
- Music by: Eugene Poddany, Milt Franklyn
- Animation by: Charles McKimson; Rod Scribner; Phil DeLara; Emery Hawkins
- Layouts by: Cornett Wood
- Backgrounds by: Richard H. Thomas
- Color process: Technicolor
- Production company: Warner Bros. Cartoons
- Distributed by: Warner Bros. Pictures
- Release date: July 28, 1951
- Running time: 7:12
- Language: English

Leghorn Swoggled is a 1951 Warner Bros. Merrie Melodies cartoon directed by Robert McKimson and written by Warren Foster. The cartoon was released on July 28, 1951, and features Foghorn Leghorn, Henery Hawk and the Barnyard Dawg. The cartoon's plot is similar to Henhouse Henery (1949) and The Leghorn Blows at Midnight (1950). The title is a humorous portmanteau of Leghorn (Foghorn's last name and a reference to the chicken breed of the same name) and the word "hornswoggle", meaning to lie and deceive.

== Plot ==
Barnyard Dawg invites Foghorn to see a total eclipse for free. Foghorn takes the bait, placing his head through a hole in a fence and Dawg smashes a pumpkin over Foghorn's head. To get revenge, Foghorn sets up a prank by dousing water over Dawg, luring him around a tree, and then punching the Dawg with a trick camera.

Henery Hawk is walking on the top of a fence with a rope, and when he sees Foghorn he lassos him around the neck. In response, Foghorn chases Henery away. Dejected, Henery encounters the Dawg, who promises to help him catch Foghorn in exchange for a bone. As he looks for one he also is prompted to get a fish for a cat and some cheese for a mouse.

Foghorn sees Henery attempting to retrieve the cheese and runs over to stop him. Foghorn warns Henery that there is a "right way and a wrong way" to handling the mouse trap, which then snaps on Foghorn. Henery meanwhile is at a pond trying to catch a fish. Foghorn then turns his attention to Henery, who based on advice from the cat is digging for a bone. Henery takes the bone and places it in a wagon along with the fish and the piece of cheese. In between assisting Henery, Foghorn pulls various pranks on Dawg. After that Henery gives the items he collected to their respective collectors.

Seeing this, Foghorn asks Henery why he did not receive a present. Dawg then knocks Foghorn out cold with the bone after Foghorn demands he get something and wants it "right now", and presents him to Henery. Henery then rides the same model train that Foghorn used earlier, carrying the unconscious Foghorn behind him, and delivers the final punchline in Foghorn Leghorn style: "I may be little, I say, I may be little, but I sure caught me a big chicken!"

== Home media ==
This short is available on the Looney Tunes Collector's Choice: Volume 4 Blu-ray.
