= A Fractured Leghorn =

1950 film by Robert McKimson

- Title card (unrestored)
- Directed by: Robert McKimson
- Story by: Warren Foster
- Starring: Mel Blanc
- Music by: Carl Stalling
- Animation by: Rod Scribner; Phil DeLara; J.C. Melendez; Charles McKimson; Manuel Perez (unc.)
- Layouts by: Cornett Wood
- Backgrounds by: Phil De Guard
- Color process: Technicolor
- Production company: Warner Bros. Cartoons
- Distributed by: Warner Bros. Pictures
- Release date: September 16, 1950
- Running time: 7 minutes
- Country: United States
- Language: English

A Fractured Leghorn is a 1950 Warner Bros. Merrie Melodies cartoon directed by Robert McKimson. The cartoon was released on September 16, 1950, and features Foghorn Leghorn.

That is one of few Foghorn Leghorn cartoons where he is not put at odds with Henery Hawk and the Barnyard Dawg. Mel Blanc voices both Foghorn and the cat in this cartoon.

== Plot ==
A cat is shown in Foghorn's resident farm, fishing in the local pond. Instead, he receives a note from the fish reading "Dear Dope, You can't catch us Fish without a Worm on the hook." Frustrated, the cat begins to look for a worm around the farm. Meanwhile, Foghorn Leghorn encounters a small green worm and chases him into a corner, where he and the cat crash into each other. Recovering from his daze, Foghorn confronts the cat and questions why he's chasing after worms instead of mice. The cat, unable to talk back at the rambling rooster, is eventually pushed up a ladder before falling off, with Foghorn remarking "There's nothing worse than a blabbermouth cat", even though Foghorn himself is the blabbermouth. The cat, knowing that Foghorn would be a great interference for his quest for a worm, tricks him into getting his head stuck in a fence (via a wooden guillotine) and used a paintbrush attached to an automated wheel to repeatedly smack him in the face with green paint.

Later on, the cat continues to chase the worm around the farm until confronting him at a tractor. He attempts to get the worm out by blowing into its muffler. But Foghorn, having escaped the fence, initiates the engine, causing carbon smoke to blow into the cat's mouth. Enraged, the cat retrieved a nearby axe he can use against Foghorn, only for him to return and take it from the cat (believing that the cat thinks he's George Washington) before sticking it onto the fence. The cat tries to jam it out before the entire wooden board falls over, revealing the worm once again. He chases the worm into a small hole in the ground, in which he uses a hand pump in an attempt to blow the worm out from another hole nearby. Foghorn interjects once again with another long-winded confrontation, asking why the cat is pumping the ground, assuming he is pumping the ground for oil. After pushing the cat away, Foghorn returns to the scene in question and uses the pump, discovering its true purpose. As he tries to blow the worm out himself, the cat return and snatches it from him before he takes a bite at it.

Back at the pond, the cat forces the worm at gunpoint to act as bait for the fishes. As he is about to go fishing, Foghorn emerges from the pond, interjecting once again. In other rambled confrontation, Foghorn concludes that in an effort to not be "hoggish", he convinces the cat to divide the worm with an axe. He draws a line over a tree stump to signal the bisection, but the worm scrunches himself in both sides, confusing Foghorn over his and the cats "missing halves." The cat tries to point this out to him, but Foghorn instead questions whether the worm was there at all as due to "mathematics" and "figures", letting the worm escape once again. Finally having enough of Foghorn's tangents and being pushed around, the cat yells at the rooster to shut up and hits him in the head with a small trash can before storming off smiling.

Forgetting about the worm, Foghorn says to the audience: "OK, I'll shut up" before explaining that he isn't one of those annoying people who "always just have to keep their mouths flapping" and that he was properly raised, including how every time his father told him to shut up, to which he followed. As the cartoon begin to iris-out, how one time he nearly starved to death. But right as the circle is the size of his own head, Foghorn pulls it apart and screams, "WOULDN'T TELL HIM I WAS HUNGRY!" before it closes.

== Home media ==
This short is available on the Looney Tunes Collector's Choice: Volume 1 Blu-ray.
