= Daffy Duck's Fantastic Island =

1983 animated film by Friz Freleng and Phil Monroe

- Theatrical release poster
- Directed by: Friz Freleng; Phil Monroe (co-director)
- Story by: John Dunn; Dave Detiege; Friz Freleng
- Based on: Daffy Duck by Tex Avery; Bob Clampett
- Produced by: Friz Freleng; Hal Geer; Jean MacCurdy
- Starring: Mel Blanc; June Foray; Les Tremayne
- Edited by: Jim Champin
- Music by: Rob Walsh; Gene Poddany; Orchestration: Don McGinnis
- Animation by: Brenda Banks; Warren Batchelder; Brad Case; Bob Matz; Norm McCabe; Richard Thompson; Bob Bransford; Terrence Lennon; Sam Nicholson; Derry Ray; Scanimation Effects: Ed Kramer (uncredited)
- Layouts by: Bob Givens; Michael Mitchell
- Backgrounds by: Richard Thomas
- Color process: Color
- Production company: Warner Bros. Animation
- Distributed by: Warner Bros.
- Release date: August 5, 1983
- Running time: 78 minutes
- Country: United States
- Language: English

Daffy Duck's Fantastic Island (also known as Daffy Duck's Movie: Fantastic Island) is a 1983 American animated anthology film directed by Friz Freleng and Phil Monroe with a compilation of classic Warner Bros. cartoon shorts and animated bridging sequences, hosted by Daffy Duck and Speedy Gonzales. This was the first Looney Tunes compilation film to center on Daffy Duck, as the previous ones had centered on Bugs Bunny. The premise of the framing animation was a general parody of the popular 1970s/1980s television series Fantasy Island, with Daffy Duck and Speedy Gonzales playing caricatures of that series' principal characters, Mr. Roarke and Tattoo (respectively).

A note in the end credits dedicates the film to animator and story man, John Dunn, "who inspired it." Dunn died of heart failure in San Fernando, California on January 17, 1983; six months before the film's release.

== Plot ==
Daffy Duck and Speedy Gonzales are castaways shipwrecked on a desert island for months with nothing on it but a coconut tree. They discover a treasure map which leads them to a magical, talking wishing well. The greedy Daffy proposes to use the power of the well, which obeys the commands of whoever holds the map. Rather than simply wishing for a heap of wealth, Daffy figures he can make himself and Speedy rich by transforming the barren island into a verdant tourist paradise and selling other people wishes for a hefty fee. Speedy and Daffy attire themselves in the white suits worn by Tattoo and Roarke in the television show Fantasy Island, while an airplane carrying various Looney Tunes characters arrives on the island. As the customers step up for their chance at the well, their wishes are fulfilled through the events of classic Looney Tunes cartoons.

Meanwhile, pirate Yosemite Sam and his first mate, the Tasmanian Devil, search for the map, which originally belonged to them. They had earlier lost their ship in a battle with Bugs Bunny. With a single black feather for a clue, they eventually find out that Daffy took it. In their pursuit of Daffy and Speedy, Sam inadvertently chases the former up a mountain and, upon both losing their grip on the map, into a field of volcanic rock. The map is lost to all because of this, causing the island to revert to what it once was. Daffy, Speedy, Sam, and Taz are trapped on the once-again-deserted island. The well gives them three wishes individually, but warns them to use them wisely, for they are the last wishes it will ever grant. Daffy and Speedy waste their wishes, Speedy wishing for a burrito, then Daffy angrily responding by wishing the burrito was stuck on the end of Speedy's nose. Daffy asks Sam to wish the burrito off Speedy's nose, but discovers that Sam already wished for a ship, abandoning Daffy and telling them that, after he sinks Bugs, he will return to rescue the pair, much to Daffy's fury. The wishing well signs off with "That's all, folks!".

=== Classic cartoons in order ===
The following includes the Well's descriptions of each cartoon (except for the first one) in relation to that character's wish. Some cartoons are abridged.

- Captain Hareblower (Pirate Sam vs. Bugs Bunny, shortened)
- Stupor Duck (Daffy's wish): "Your fondest wish, your fondest dream... ...I'll make you superduck supreme!"
- Greedy for Tweety (Granny's wish, slightly extended): "Your wish shall be granted. Gaze into me and see. The next time that you see yourself... a nurse is what you'll be!"
- Banty Raids (Foghorn Leghorn's wish, shortened): "I am here to grant your wish, the spirit of the well. I will knock the cockiness out of that little cockerel."
- Louvre Come Back to Me! (Pepé Le Pew's wish, shortened): "I grant your wish to meet a girl of beauty unsurpassed... which when compared with works of art... ...will leave the Louvre outclassed."
- Tree for Two (Spike & Chester's wish): "If that's his wish and yours alike... ...I'll make Chester brave and strong, like Spike."
- Curtain Razor (Porky Pig's wish, shortened with altered opening): "Discovering new talent for the world to see... ...a wondrous thing for a producer to be."
- A Mouse Divided (Sylvester's wife's wish, the opening with the drunken stork is omitted and the ending was changed to occur on the island): "I hear your wish and I obey. The patter of little feet you shall hear this day."
- Of Rice and Hen & Lovelorn Leghorn (Prissy's wish, with the opening of the former and the plot of the latter): "Your mind is such a simple thing... ...your wish I can foretell. You're wishing for a husband, and the ring of a wedding bell?"
- From Hare to Heir (Pirate Sam's wish): "A very rich relative in poor health... ...doth will to you his entire wealth."

== Voice cast ==
- Mel Blanc as Daffy Duck, Speedy Gonzales, Yosemite Sam, Bugs Bunny, Tasmanian Devil, Foghorn Leghorn, Pepé Le Pew, Spike, Porky Pig, Sylvester, Tweety, and Crows
- June Foray as Granny, Mrs. Sylvester, and Miss Prissy
- Les Tremayne as Wishing Well

== Merchandise ==
In 1981, a puzzle showing 105 Looney Tunes characters was issued. Among the characters are three who had never appeared in animation, identified as Hoppy, Hysterical Hyram and Minniesoda Fats. In one scene in Daffy Duck's Fantastic Island, Hoppy and Hysterical Hyram are seen waiting for their chance to make their dreams come true (along with two other unidentified characters, namely a white dog and a small mouse with a hat). It is their only known appearance in animation.

== Home media ==
The film was released on DVD exclusively through Wal-Mart on August 12, 2014, and by Warner Home Video on November 18, 2014. It is also available as a download from the iTunes Store. It finally saw a UK DVD release on July 5, 2021.
