= Sock a Doodle Do =

Sock-A-Doodle-Do
- Directed by: Robert McKimson
- Story by: Tedd Pierce
- Starring: Mel Blanc; Sheldon Leonard (uncredited)
- Music by: Carl Stalling
- Animation by: Charles McKimson; Rod Scribner; Phil DeLara
- Layouts by: Peter Alvarado
- Backgrounds by: Richard H. Thomas
- Color process: Technicolor
- Production company: Warner Bros. Cartoons
- Distributed by: Warner Bros. Pictures
- Release date: May 10, 1952
- Running time: 7:15
- Language: English

Sock-A-Doodle-Do is a 1952 Warner Bros. Looney Tunes animated short directed by Robert McKimson. The cartoon was released on May 10, 1952, and features Foghorn Leghorn and the Barnyard Dawg. The voices are performed by Mel Blanc, though Banty was voiced by an uncredited Sheldon Leonard.

== Plot ==
The cartoon opens with a car pulling a small trailer carrying "Kid Banty", a champion fighting rooster. The car hits a bump and Kid Banty falls out of the trailer. Banty, wearing boxing gloves, begins punching a cow when the bell around its neck rings, indicating that his aggression is triggered by bells.

The Barnyard Dawg is securing a large pipe to a makeshift elevated platform constructed out of wood. Dawg affixes a sign that reads "See A Genuine Flying Saucer." Foghorn Leghorn, curious, looks inside the pipe, whereupon Dawg launches a teacup saucer through the pipe, which breaks on Foghorn's head. Dawg follows this with throwing the teacup itself at Foghorn. Barnyard Dawg appears and asks Foghorn if he wants "one or two lumps" (repeating from several other Warner cartoons) and a dazed Foghorn says "two", whereupon Dawg produces a large mallet and whacks Foghorn on the head.

Later, Foghorn is repairing an alarm clock when Banty walks by. When it rings, Banty punches Leghorn. Foghorn asks Banty why, and Banty says that every time he hears a bell, he starts punching. Foghorn ponders this, and then plans revenge on Dawg. Foghorn sends Banty to the doghouse to ask for a punching bag. When he does, Foghorn then rings a chime which causes Banty to punch Dawg. When Dawg confronts him, Banty says that Foghorn sent him. Dawg, wanting to get even, gives Banty a gift-wrapped box and tells him a punching bag is inside. Foghorn warns Banty that the box may be a trap but opens it anyway, revealing a clock. The clock chimes and Banty punches Leghorn again.

Foghorn tries to bribe Dawg to be Banty's sparring partner, to which Dawg refuses but promises to find him another partner. Dawg lures Leghorn to a tree trunk that supposedly has a show with dancing girls inside. Foghorn falls for it and sticks his head in the trunk finding nothing but a small hole. Foghorn muses that the hole is some kind of "peep show" and sticks his head inside, but Dawg has set up a miniature boxing ring on top of the tree trunk. Banty, ready to spar, uses Foghorn's head as a punching bag.

== Home media ==
This short is available on disc 1 of the Looney Tunes Collector's Vault: Volume 2 Blu-ray set.

== Succession ==
Preceded by Lovelorn Leghorn	Foghorn Leghorn cartoons 1952	Succeeded by The EGGcited Rooster
