= Daffy Duck Hunt =

- Title card
- Directed by: Robert McKimson
- Story by: Warren Foster
- Starring: Mel Blanc
- Music by: Carl Stalling
- Animation by: Phil DeLara; John Carey; Manny Gould; Charles McKimson
- Layouts by: Cornett Wood
- Backgrounds by: Richard H. Thomas
- Color process: Technicolor
- Production company: Warner Bros. Cartoons
- Distributed by: Warner Bros. Pictures; The Vitaphone Corporation
- Release date: March 26, 1949
- Running time: 7:15
- Language: English

Daffy Duck Hunt is a 1949 Warner Bros. Looney Tunes cartoon, directed by Robert McKimson. The cartoon was released on March 26, 1949, and stars Daffy Duck, Porky Pig and Barnyard Dawg.

== Plot ==
Porky and Barnyard Dawg are out hunting ducks, with Daffy Duck as their target. Daffy, however, turns the tables on them by sabotaging their gunpowder and taunting them mercilessly. Porky's attempts to capture Daffy are continually thwarted, leading to chaotic antics involving a deep freeze, mistaken identities, and a comical struggle for dominance.

As Porky and the dog become increasingly frustrated with Daffy's antics, their attempts to contain him escalate to absurd levels. Eventually, Daffy's antics culminate in a surprise appearance dressed as Santa Claus, leading to a humorous confrontation that ends with a clever twist involving a "Do not open 'till Xmas" stamp and Daffy's confident assurance that he will find a way out of the predicament.

== Voice Cast ==
- Mel Blanc as Daffy Duck / Porky Pig / Barnyard Dawg / Barnyard Dawg's Devil and Angel

== Home media ==
- VHS 1992 - Daffy Duck's Madcap Mania - Warner Home Video
- Laserdisc 1993 - Duck Victory: Daffy Duck Screen Classics - Warner Home Video
- VHS 1999 - Looney Tunes: The Collectors Edition, Vol. 4: Daffy Doodles - Warner Home Video
- DVD 2003 - Looney Tunes Golden Collection: Volume 1 (restored) - Warner Home Video
- DVD 2003 - Looney Tunes Spotlight Collection: Volume 1 (restored) - Warner Home Video

== See also ==
- Daffy Duck filmography
- Porky Pig filmography
- Looney Tunes and Merrie Melodies filmography (1940–1949)
