= Feather Dusted =

- Directed by: Robert McKimson
- Story by: Tedd Pierce
- Starring: Mel Blanc
- Music by: Milt Franklyn
- Animation by: Rod Scribner; Herman Cohen; Phil DeLara; Charles McKimson
- Layouts by: Bob Givens
- Backgrounds by: Richard H. Thomas
- Color process: Technicolor
- Production company: Warner Bros. Cartoons
- Distributed by: Warner Bros. Pictures
- Release date: January 15, 1955
- Running time: 6:43
- Language: English

Feather Dusted is a 1955 Warner Bros. Merrie Melodies animated short film directed by Robert McKimson. The cartoon was released on January 15, 1955, and features Foghorn Leghorn, Miss Prissy and Egghead Jr.

Foghorn tries to play games with Egghead Jr., but finds that playing with the child can be dangerous.

== Plot ==
Miss Prissy goes off to a (literal) hen party, leaving her son Egghead Jr. behind. Passing by "loafer" Foghorn, Foghorn takes it upon himself to play games with Egghead Jr. instead of having to read "How to Isolate the Isotope". Although Egghead Jr. "shakes his head when he means yes, and nods when he means no," Foghorn tries playing games with him.

Foghorn first tries to explain how to play croquet, but Egghead Jr. manages to knock the ball through all the wickets in one shot (showing off his diagram when Foghorn doesn't believe that shot is possible). Foghorn then tries playing cops and robbers, with himself playing the role of the robber, but Egghead Jr. blows a whistle, alerting police officers who arrest Foghorn offscreen. Using his diagram, he marks an X where Foghorn digs out, complete with prison outfit and ball and chain ("Boy, I say boy, let's play somethin' less confining.") Next, they try playing Indians and Daniel Boone, but Foghorn gets a face full of buckshot when he pulls the cork out of Egghead Jr.'s gun.

Foghorn then plays pirates with Egghead Jr., but when he tries adjusting the 'cannon' (instead of listening to Egghead Jr.'s diagram, which points the cannon away from the target), the cannonball winds up bouncing into Foghorn's mouth, knocking him into the lake. Finally, Foghorn goes swimming, and tells Egghead Jr. that he's a "battleship", encouraging him to swim in and "sink me". Egghead Jr. instead winds up a series of mini battleships that shoot at Foghorn, sinking him. When Egghead Jr. pulls Foghorn out of the lake, Miss Prissy comes and berates Foghorn for causing trouble ("Mark my words, one of these days, some of your childish pranks are going to backfire on you.") Foghorn gets up, admits guilt ("Ma'am, I say ma'am, you are so right!"), and lets water leak through the holes he has in his body sustained by Egghead's battleships.

== Home media ==
- VHS - The Looney Tunes Video Show #5
- VHS - Foghorn Leghorn's Fractured Funnies
- Blu-ray - Looney Tunes Collector's Vault: Volume 1
