= Weasel While You Work =

- Title card
- Directed by: Robert McKimson
- Story by: Michael Maltese
- Produced by: John W. Burton
- Starring: Mel Blanc (all voices)
- Edited by: Treg Brown
- Music by: John Seeley
- Animation by: Warren Batchelder; Tom Ray; Ted Bonnicksen; George Grandpré
- Layouts by: Robert Gribbroek
- Backgrounds by: Robert Gribbroek
- Color process: Technicolor
- Production company: Warner Bros. Cartoons
- Distributed by: Warner Bros. Pictures
- Release date: September 6, 1958
- Running time: 6 mins
- Language: English

Weasel While You Work is a 1958 Warner Bros. Merrie Melodies animated short directed by Robert McKimson. The cartoon was released on September 6, 1958, and features Foghorn Leghorn and the Barnyard Dawg. The weasel seen in this short previously appeared in Plop Goes the Weasel (1953) and Weasel Stop (1956).

Unlike many Foghorn shorts, this one takes place during the winter. The title is a pun on the phrase and song "Whistle While You Work".

== Plot ==
During winter, Foghorn drags Barnyard Dawg from his doghouse, coats him in snow, and puts snowman decorations on him. Dawg emerges from the snowman and says he will "moider the bum". He sharpens one of Foghorn's ice skates, which causes Foghorn to fall through the ice when he skates a circle. In revenge, Foghorn rolls a snowball down the hill toward Dawg, who moves out of the way, before the giant snowball hits a curve and flies back at Foghorn, burying him.

Suddenly, Foghorn is attacked by a ravenously hungry weasel who gnaws his leg. Foghorn grabs the weasel and asks him if he would prefer some "venison". Foghorn slips antlers onto Dawg's head and directs the weasel to him. The weasel attacks Dawg's leg. Dawg notices the antlers and removes them and asks the weasel if he would prefer some "frozen chicken".

Foghorn's sled crashes into a fallen tree that Dawg had placed in his path. While Foghorn is down, Dawg throws a bucket of water over him, freezing him in a block of ice. Dawg presents the ice block to the weasel, who splits it in half with an axe. Foghorn says he has a "splittin' headache" before he too splits in half. As revenge, Foghorn traps Dawg in a corset, making him resemble a seal, and gives him to the weasel to cook. While being peppered, Dawg sneezes, which buries him in an avalanche. A furious Dawg tells the weasel that he is a dog and that he should get a chicken instead. Later, the skiing Foghorn hits a tall pole and slides into a cooking pot where the weasel is hungrily waiting. Foghorn bolts, but Dawg hands a club to the weasel, who chases Foghorn until he is distracted by a huge Foghorn ice statue, which he proceeds to gnaw on.

The real Foghorn, watching from behind a tree, thinks his troubles are over until at least the Fourth of July. In the final set piece, Foghorn pulls on what he thinks is Barnyard Dawg's tail from his doghouse, but it is actually a lit rocket, which shoots Foghorn into the sky. As the cartoon ends, Dawg remarks that "the Fourth of July came a little early this year".

== Production ==
This is one of six cartoons scored by using stock music by John Seely of Capitol Records from the Hi-Q library because of a musicians' strike in 1958. The others are A Bird in a Bonnet, Hook, Line and Stinker, Pre-Hysterical Hare, Gopher Broke, and Hip Hip-Hurry!.

Mel Blanc supplied the voices of Foghorn Leghorn, Barnyard Dawg, and the weasel.

== Critical response ==
According to Michael Samerdyke, Weasel While You Work is "a very strong late Foghorn Leghorn cartoon .... The only jarring note, as several writers have noted, is the music by John Seely", which Samerdyke says is "ill-suited" to the Warner Bros. style.

The short was reviewed in Hollywood Classics, volume 23.

== Cast ==
- Mel Blanc – Foghorn Leghorn / Barnyard Dawg / Willy the Weasel

== See also ==
- List of American films of 1958

Preceded by Feather Bluster	Foghorn Leghorn cartoons 1958	Succeeded by A Broken Leghorn
