= The Foghorn Leghorn =

1948 animated short film by Robert McKimson

- Original title card
- Directed by: Robert McKimson
- Story by: Warren Foster
- Starring: Mel Blanc
- Music by: Carl Stalling
- Animation by: Charles McKimson; Manny Gould; Phil DeLara; John Carey; Pete Burness; Fred Abranz (uncr.)
- Layouts by: Cornett Wood
- Backgrounds by: Richard H. Thomas
- Color process: Technicolor
- Production company: Warner Bros. Cartoons
- Distributed by: Warner Bros. Pictures
- Release date: October 9, 1948
- Running time: 7:00
- Language: English

The Foghorn Leghorn is a 1948 Warner Bros. Merrie Melodies cartoon directed by Robert McKimson. The cartoon was released on October 9, 1948, and features Foghorn Leghorn, Henery Hawk and the Barnyard Dawg.

== Plot ==
To prevent Henery Hawk from joining him in raiding a chicken coop, his father tells him that chickens are gigantic and terrifying monsters. However, Henery is not afraid, and decides to follow his father secretly. Henery Hawk's father is surprised by Foghorn Leghorn who chases him away. Henery, arriving on the spot, asks his father if that was a chicken, but he replies that it was just a "loud-mouthed shnook". Walking away, Henery comes across Barnyard Dawg's doghouse, which, due to his father's false stories about chickens, he assumes is a "chicken's cave". He takes a hammer, hits the sleeping dog over the head, and proceeds to haul his prey across the barnyard. He is stopped by Foghorn who tries to convince him that he is a chicken, but is not helped by Barnyard Dawg who, waking up, kicks the rooster and calls him a shnook. Foghorn then tries in vain two more times to convince Henery. In the meantime, the little hawk continues to want to capture Barnyard Dawg and throws a stick of dynamite into his doghouse. Knowing he will be blamed, Foghorn dives into the doghouse to stop the explosion, but fails. In the rubble, Barnyard Dawg finds Foghorn holding the remains of the dynamite and begins beating him, calling him a "good-for-nothing chicken." This is at last enough to convince Henery, who brings a shovel down on Foghorn and begins dragging him off. Disgusted with himself, the rooster admits, "I'm just a loud-mouthed schnook." Henery declares, "Chicken or shnook, in our oven he'll look good!"

== Home media ==
- VHS - Warner Bros. Cartoons Golden Jubilee 24 Karat Collection: Foghorn Leghorn's Fractured Funnies
- VHS - Special Bumper Collection (Vol. 1) (UK)
- VHS - Looney Tunes: The Collectors Edition, Vol. 1: All-Stars
- DVD - Looney Tunes Golden Collection: Volume 1, Disc Four (original opening and credits restored)
- Blu-ray, DVD - Looney Tunes Platinum Collection: Volume 2, Disc 1

== Censorship ==
- On ABC's "The Bugs Bunny & Tweety Show", The dog revealed to be inside of the trunk pushed by Henery and being pounded on the head and slapped in the face by Foghorn was excised, as too was the scene immediately after dynamite detonates in the barnyard dog's house; all that the viewer saw was the smoke of the explosion followed by the dog already in the process of throwing Foghorn to the ground in retribution for what the dog believed was Foghorn's treacherous act.
- On CBS' "The Bugs Bunny/Road Runner Hour", A long sequence was deleted: Henery throws a stick of lit dynamite into the barnyard dog's house. Foghorn, fearing blame, attempts to retrieve the dynamite. Of course, it explodes in the doghouse as Foghorn has just grabbed it and is about to throw it out of the house. Foghorn looks guilty as sin with the remnant of the dynamite in his hand. The dog then slams Foghorn several times against the ground, calling him a no-good chicken. When Henery hears this, he realizes that Foghorn really is a chicken (and not a "schnook") and bashes Foghorn over the face with a shovel. With all of this cut, it appeared that Foghorn merely, "...talked (Henery) into it."
