= Feather Bluster =

- Directed by: Robert McKimson
- Story by: Tedd Pierce
- Starring: Mel Blanc
- Edited by: Treg Brown
- Music by: Milt Franklyn; Carl Stalling
- Animation by: Warren Batchelder; Ted Bonnicksen; George Grandpre; Tom Ray
- Layouts by: Robert Gribbroek
- Backgrounds by: William Butler
- Color process: Technicolor
- Production company: Warner Bros. Cartoons
- Distributed by: Warner Bros. Pictures
- Release date: May 10, 1958 (USA premiere)
- Running time: 7 min (one reel)
- Language: English

Feather Bluster is a 1958 Warner Bros. Merrie Melodies animated short directed by Robert McKimson. The cartoon was released on May 10, 1958, and features Foghorn Leghorn and the Barnyard Dawg.

The short reuses footage from Henhouse Henery (1949) and The High and the Flighty (1956).

== Plot ==
The story begins with an elderly Foghorn Leghorn and Barnyard Dawg peacefully playing checkers. The two have grandsons who are known to imitate their actions during their younger years; first Foghorn's grandson spanks Dawg's grandson (named Pup) with a tiny board, causing the latter to chase him unsuccessfully when he is jerked to a stop by his rope. Foghorn's grandson then yells "AHH SHADDUP!!!" while slapping Pup, startling Foghorn upon hearing the noises and angrily questions his grandson's actions towards Pup. Dawg then tells Foghorn that Foghorn's grandson takes up from him, and they begin to recount old stories of them pulling pranks on one another. Flashbacks include:

- Dawg runs into the fence that Foghorn painted to make look like an open gate, and when Foghorn runs into a mill to create a baseball bat to use against Dawg who steals it; except it has some newly-made animation the appears just after the Dawg steals the bat, showing Foghorn coming out of the workshop apparently unscathed telling the audience "That, I say, that dawg keeps a-pitchin' 'em and I keep a-duckin' 'em!", only to prove himself wrong when after briefly going back in, he falls over in a daze after coming back out.
- Foghorn gives Dawg a rigged spring-loaded bone.
- Foghorn tries to blow a stick of dynamite through a tube at Dawg, but it backfires.
- Foghorn scares Dawg out of his dog house and proceeds to paint his tongue green.

Unbeknownst to Foghorn and Dawg, their grandsons had been listening to them the whole time, with Foghorn dismissing Dawg's concern when the latter inquires about it. Towards the end of the cartoon, they decide to check on their grandsons, when Foghorn's grandson asks Pup to play "doctor", essentially tricking Pup into having his tongue painted green.

== Home media ==
This short is available on disc 1 of the Looney Tunes Collector's Vault: Volume 3 Blu-ray set.

Preceded by Fox-Terror	Foghorn Leghorn cartoons 1958	Succeeded by Weasel While You Work
