= Bah, Humduck! A Looney Tunes Christmas =

2006 animated film

- Directed by: Charles Visser
- Written by: Ray DeLaurentis
- Based on: A Christmas Carol by Charles Dickens Looney Tunes by Warner Bros.
- Produced by: Frank Molieri; Sander Schwartz
- Starring: Joe Alaskey; Bob Bergen; Billy West; June Foray; Maurice LaMarche; Jim Cummings; Tara Strong; Paul Julian
- Edited by: Rob Desales
- Music by: Gordon Goodwin
- Production companies: Warner Bros. Family Entertainment; Warner Bros. Animation (Note: Animation outsourced to and from Toon City.)
- Distributed by: Warner Home Video
- Release date: November 14, 2006
- Running time: 46 minutes
- Country: United States
- Language: English

Bah, Humduck! A Looney Tunes Christmas (also known as Looney Tunes: Bah Humduck) is a 2006 animated direct-to-DVD Christmas comedy film starring the Looney Tunes characters, directed by Charles Visser, produced by Warner Bros. Animation and animated by Toon City Animation. The film is based on Charles Dickens' novella A Christmas Carol (1843). The special was released on DVD on November 14, 2006, and was then broadcast on Cartoon Network in December 2006. The special was rereleased on DVD as part of the Looney Tunes Holiday Triple Feature on September 1, 2020. It continues to air annually on Cartoon Network, as well as sister networks Boomerang and The CW, as part of their All I Watch for Christmas block.

== Plot ==
Bugs Bunny pops out of his hole to clear snow when he nearly gets hit by a gas-guzzling SUV driven by Daffy Duck playing as Ebenezer Scrooge, owner of the Lucky Duck Superstore (a megastore like Costco). Bugs follows Daffy, scolding him for refusing to help Playboy Penguin, but is ignored. Throughout the day, Daffy treats his employees poorly, tries to steal charity money (collected by the characters like Egghead Jr., Henery Hawk, and Barnyard Dawg), struggles with his hover scooter and gets beaten up by employees and customers after insulting them. Daffy openly admits he hates the holidays, and Bugs warns him about consequences, referencing A Christmas Carol, and says "Bah, Humduck!" Daffy adopts this as his catchphrase.

After working his employees to the bone on Christmas Eve, Daffy expects them all back at 5:00 AM on Christmas Day so he can capitalize on last-minute shoppers. Assistant Manager Porky Pig (in a Bob Cratchit-like role) pleads with Daffy to let him go home for Christmas and spend time with his daughter Priscilla (in a Tiny Tim-like role), but Daffy refuses.

Later, Daffy's deceased business idol Sylvester the Investor appears, chains as punishment for greed after a disgruntled employee ran him over nine times with a forklift. Sylvester warns Daffy that if he doesn't change his ways, he will share his fate and adds that three ghosts will visit him. Daffy, thinking this is a trick by Bugs, dismisses Sylvester's warning. Afterward, Daffy declines Elmer Fudd's vacation request, Marvin the Martian's trip home, and Porky Pig's wish to visit his daughter Priscilla and her doll, which Daffy tripled the price for. That night, everyone goes home, and Daffy ends up trapped in the store with Bugs by a snowdrift.

Daffy locks himself in his vault to sleep safely, but the Ghosts of Christmas Past (portrayed by Granny and Tweety) appears, taking him back to his childhood at the Lucky Duck Orphanage, where he was ignored every Christmas, explaining his unhappy demeanor and how his store got its name. The Ghost of Christmas Present (portrayed by Yosemite Sam) then appears, scolding Daffy for mistreating his employees and warning him that if he doesn't change, his future will be bleak. The ghost shows Elmer Fudd sleeping on the street due to Daffy's workload, Marvin grieving his inability to visit his home planet, and Porky with his daughter Priscilla. Daffy begins to feel emotion, not guilt, and pleads with Bugs to hide him from the final ghost. After a reenactment, Daffy is left alone with the Ghost of Christmas Yet to Come (portrayed by the Tasmanian Devil).

The Ghost shows Daffy his future, revealing his greed caused his death. At his grave, Porky tells Priscilla that Daffy tried to name himself heir, which was illegal, forcing the Lucky Duck Superstore to close and employees to lose jobs but enjoy Christmas with their families. Priscilla, staying longer, confesses she never hated Daffy and understands loneliness during holidays. She promises to visit his grave every Christmas, leaving cookies. Her kindness melts Daffy's coldness, and his heart breaks when he realizes his greed hid his true wish for family. Daffy vows to be kinder as the Ghost of Christmas Yet to Come departs.

Returning to the present, he begins reparations by waking Elmer, promising him a paid vacation. He makes Porky store manager, gives Marvin a rocket to Mars, hires Playboy Penguin, and gifts his employees, offering raises and vacations. He briefly worries about recovering costs, but it fades when Priscilla calls him "Uncle Daffy", fulfilling his wish to belong. The Ghosts of Christmas watch happily, pleased with their success.

Porky and Priscilla finish the movie by saying Porky's famous line: "T-T-T-That's all folks!"

== Characters ==
- Bugs Bunny - Himself, Narrator, also a Lucky Duck customer; serves as a Fred-type foil to Daffy.
- Daffy Duck - Owner of Lucky Duck Superstore, he despises families and Christmas because he was continuously rejected by potential adopters, which basically explains his greed and love for money. He would stop despising families when he finally gets his wish to be a part of a family by allowing Priscilla to call him uncle. He is based on Ebenezer Scrooge.
- Porky Pig - Assistant Manager of Lucky Duck Superstore; based on Bob Cratchit.
- Egghead Jr., Henery Hawk, Barnyard Dawg Jr. - Carolers
- Pepé Le Pew, Speedy Gonzales, Marvin the Martian, Elmer Fudd, Wile E. Coyote, Road Runner, Foghorn Leghorn, The Three Bears, Sam Sheepdog, Claude Cat, Charlie Dog, Miss Prissy, Barnyard Dawg, Mac, Tosh, Hippety Hopper, Beaky Buzzard, Hubie and Bertie - Lucky Duck employees
  - Pete Puma - Lucky Duck janitor, reprising this occupation from Tiny Toon Adventures
  - Gossamer - Lucky Duck security guard
- Penelope Pussycat - Lucky Duck customer; as with her original role, she is also Pepé Le Pew's girlfriend.
- Sylvester the Cat - Ghost of "Sylvester the Investor". Based on Jacob Marley, Sylvester was Daffy's business idol, whose fate was predetermined because of his own greed. He warns Daffy that the same fate would befall on him unless he changes his ways, while also saying that three Ghosts of Christmas will visit him. The scene also reveals that his death was caused by a disgruntled employee who squished him with a forklift nine times, as opposed to the novel in which Marley died of more natural causes (such as old age).
- Granny and Tweety Bird - Ghosts of Christmas Past who takes Daffy to his past to reveal how his greed and love for money surfaced.
- Yosemite Sam - Ghost of Christmas Present who beats up Daffy every time he gets insensitive for his employees' misery.
- Taz - Ghost of Christmas Future who is the only one who actually got through to Daffy when he shows him the consequences of his greed: his untimely death.
- Priscilla Pig - Kind and caring daughter of Porky; serves as a Tiny Tim-type foil to Daffy.
- Playboy Penguin - Beggar who lives near Lucky Duck Superstore; towards the end, he becomes a Lucky Duck employee.

== Cast ==
- Joe Alaskey as Daffy Duck, Sylvester the Investor, Marvin the Martian, Pepé Le Pew, Foghorn Leghorn
- Bob Bergen as Porky Pig, Speedy Gonzales, the Ghost of Christmas Past
- Billy West as Bugs Bunny, Elmer Fudd
- June Foray as the Ghost of Christmas Past
- Maurice LaMarche as the Ghost of Christmas Present
- Tara Strong as Priscilla Pig and Housewife
- Jim Cummings as the Ghost of Christmas Future and Security Guard

== See also ==
- Adaptations of A Christmas Carol
- List of Christmas films
- Bugs Bunny's Christmas Carol
- Bugs Bunny's Looney Christmas Tales
- Tom and Jerry: A Nutcracker Tale, another animated Christmas film by Warner Bros. Animation featuring Tom and Jerry.
