= The Leghorn Blows at Midnight =

- Directed by: Robert McKimson
- Story by: Warren Foster
- Starring: Mel Blanc
- Music by: Carl Stalling
- Animation by: Charles McKimson; Phil DeLara; Rod Scribner; J.C. Melendez; Emery Hawkins
- Layouts by: Cornett Wood
- Backgrounds by: Richard H. Thomas
- Color process: Technicolor
- Production company: Warner Bros. Cartoons
- Distributed by: Warner Bros. Pictures
- Release date: May 6, 1950 (USA)
- Running time: 7 minutes
- Language: English

The Leghorn Blows at Midnight is a 1950 Warner Bros. Looney Tunes cartoon directed by Robert McKimson. The cartoon was released on May 6, 1950, and features Foghorn Leghorn, Henery Hawk and the Barnyard Dawg.

The title is a play upon the 1945 Jack Benny film The Horn Blows at Midnight.

== Plot ==
In the barnyard, Foghorn is playing solitaire when Dawg sneaks up from behind with two large clash cymbals intending to crash Foghorn's head between them, and though he misses the first time when Foghorn unknowingly ducks to lay down a card, he gets him the second time. Foghorn later retaliates by taking a cream pie from a nearby windowsill and mashing it into Dawg's face. Dawg, his face covered with cream, chases Foghorn but is strangled by his rope. Foghorn returns, throws a large metal valve pipe over Dawg's body and, much like a barber, uses a straight razor to remove the cream from Dawg's face. Foghorn then gets a scalding hot towel from a pot of boiling water and places in on Dawg's face.

Henery enters looking for a chicken and approaches Dawg who is sharpening an ax on a grinder. Thinking Dawg is a chicken, Henery tries to pull Dawg's neck rope from behind. Dawg explains that he is not a chicken, and then points to Foghorn prancing on a fence in the distance. Henery starts out after Foghorn but Dawg stops him and states that Henery has to outwit Foghorn if he is going to catch him.

Henery piques Foghorn's curiosity by trying to secure a catapult with a large pumpkin on it. Foghorn helps Henery by securing the catapult for him, and as he walks away Henery launches the pumpkin at Foghorn, which plops down over his head. Henery tells Foghorn that he wants to take him home and eat him for dinner. Playing along, Foghorn replies that he is too old and tough, and then tells him that a better choice would be pheasant under glass.

Having never seen a pheasant, Henery asks Foghorn where he can find one. Foghorn, as only he can, points to Dawg's doghouse, telling Henery that a pheasant lives inside. Foghorn provides Henery with a glass cover and Henery walks into Dawg's house and slams it over him. Dawg runs out with the glass over him but is again constrained by his rope. With Dawg temporarily immobile, Foghorn returns with a set of golf clubs, placing a golf ball on the Dawg's nose. Foghorn swings, but hits Dawg instead of the ball, sending Dawg swinging tetherball-style around the tree to which his rope is tied.

Foghorn then covers Henery with vanishing cream and Henery is led to believe that he is invisible. Henery, still under the impression that the Dawg is a pheasant, goes after him again, but when Dawg puts a mirror in front of Henery he realizes has been tricked again by Foghorn. Dawg chases Henery out of his doghouse but is again caught by the rope, and Foghorn returns with an accordion which he stuffs over the Dawg's head while playing the instrument.

Henery is about to give up his hunt, but Foghorn, citing historical episodes, convinces Henery to resume his quest; when he marches straight into the doghouse, the Dawg explains to Henery that as a chicken hawk he should be after chicken and has Henery unhook his collar from his rope. He then lures Foghorn out pretending to be again constrained by his rope. Foghorn jumps over the fence with a hammer and a platter cover only to have Dawg grab the cover, plunge it over Foghorn's head and bang on it with the hammer. Angered at being "hornswaggled", Foghorn starts fighting with Dawg.

The story closes with Henery standing next to a pot of boiling water rooting for both Foghorn and Dawg (still calling him "pheasant"), then turning to the audience saying, "I don't care who wins; I'll fricassee the loser".

== Home media ==
This short is available on the Looney Tunes Collector's Choice: Volume 2 Blu-ray.
