= Crowing Pains =

1947 animated short film by Robert McKimson

- Original title card
- Directed by: Robert McKimson
- Story by: Warren Foster
- Starring: Mel Blanc; Robert C. Bruce
- Music by: Carl Stalling
- Animation by: Manny Gould; Charles McKimson; John Carey; I. Ellis; Anatolle Kirsanoff (unc.); Fred Abranz (unc.); A.C. Gamer (effects animation)
- Layouts by: Cornett Wood
- Backgrounds by: Richard H. Thomas
- Color process: Technicolor
- Production company: Warner Bros. Cartoons
- Distributed by: Warner Bros. Pictures
- Release date: July 12, 1947
- Running time: 6:47
- Language: English

Crowing Pains is a 1947 Warner Bros. Looney Tunes cartoon directed by Robert McKimson. The cartoon was released on July 12, 1947, and stars Henery Hawk, Sylvester, Foghorn Leghorn and the Barnyard Dawg. This is McKimson's first short to feature Sylvester.

== Plot ==
Sylvester embarks on a clandestine mission to appropriate a bone from the doghouse, yet his endeavor is swiftly thwarted by the vigilant Barnyard Dawg. Following an altercation, Sylvester finds himself entangled in a series of misadventures involving Barnyard Dawg, Foghorn Leghorn, and Henery Hawk.

Subsequent to a failed attempt to liberate Barnyard Dawg's dish, Sylvester incurs the ire of his adversary and incites a pursuit. Amidst the chase, Foghorn intervenes, inadvertently exacerbating Sylvester's predicament. As tensions escalate, Sylvester retaliates against Foghorn, precipitating a cascade of confrontations. At one point, Henery Hawk, mistaking Foghorn for a chicken, ensnares him in a scheme to procure dinner. Employing subterfuge and misdirection, Foghorn implicates Sylvester as the intended prey, resulting in a succession of farcical incidents involving an egg and Sylvester's exaggerated response. His escalating frustration culminates in a confrontation with Henery Hawk, prompting a showdown to determine the true chicken. However, the resolution is fraught with further misdirection and irony, epitomized by Foghorn's utilization of ventriloquism to deceive Henery.

== Voice cast ==
- Mel Blanc as Henery Hawk, Sylvester, Foghorn Leghorn
- Robert C. Bruce as Barnyard Dawg

== Home media ==
- VHS - Cartoon Movie Stars, Tweety & Sylvester
- VHS (Swe) - Sylwester och andra smarta katter (Ayamonte AB)
- Laserdisc - The Golden Age of Looney Tunes, Vol. 2, Side 9: Best Supporting Players
- DVD - Looney Tunes Golden Collection: Volume 6, Disc 1 (original opening and credits restored)
- Streaming - HBO Max
- Streaming - Tubi
- Blu-ray - Looney Tunes Collector's Vault: Volume 2, Disc 2

== See also ==
- Sylvester the Cat filmography
- Looney Tunes and Merrie Melodies filmography (1940–1949)
