= Of Rice and Hen =

- Directed by: Robert McKimson
- Story by: Warren Foster
- Starring: Mel Blanc
- Music by: Carl Stalling
- Animation by: Herman Cohen; Rod Scribner; Phil De Lara; Charles McKimson
- Layouts by: Robert Givens
- Backgrounds by: Richard H. Thomas
- Color process: Technicolor
- Distributed by: Warner Bros. Pictures; The Vitaphone Corporation
- Release date: November 14, 1953
- Running time: 6:31
- Language: English

Of Rice and Hen is a 1953 Warner Bros. Looney Tunes animated short directed by Robert McKimson. The cartoon was released on November 14, 1953, and features Foghorn Leghorn, Miss Prissy and the Barnyard Dawg.

The title is a play on John Steinbeck's 1937 novel Of Mice and Men. Foghorn Leghorn is voiced by Mel Blanc.

== Plot ==
The story opens with several hens mothering their chicks in an ideal suburban fashion: taking them on walks and bragging to fellow hens about their exploits. One of the hens jokingly tells Miss Prissy that she is lucky not to have chicks to look after, then Prissy overhears a group of hens saying that she will "never land a man" because she is "too much of a D-R-I-P." This depresses Prissy, who then climbs up on to the roof of the barn to commit suicide.

Meanwhile, Foghorn is seen preparing to attack the dog with a board from a picket fence when he sees Prissy jump from the top of the barn. Foghorn dives to catch her, and Prissy sees Foghorn as not only a savior but a potential husband, a notion which Foghorn rejects. Foghorn then goes about his regular routine, picking up the board and going to the doghouse, where he lifts the dog up by the tail and repeatedly slaps his rear end with the board which causes the dog to chase him. Foghorn then closes the gate to the fence just in time for the dog to crash into it head first. Foghorn is then seen trying to slip a lit dynamite stick into the dog house, but the dog is wise to it and the trick backfires. Foghorn is then seen having a picnic with a large amount of food prepared by Prissy, but Foghorn rejects her again.

The dog sees Prissy's attempts to court Foghorn, and the dog tells her that she is going about it the wrong way and offers to help out, seeing it as a way to rid himself of Foghorn for good. The dog then disguises himself as a rival rooster who wants to marry Prissy, in order to make Foghorn jealous. The ruse works, as Foghorn attacks the dog and knocks him out cold. Foghorn ends up in church exclaiming, "I won, I won!", as he and Prissy are married. When Foghorn remembers that he had rejected Prissy before, he says to the audience, "Hey, there must have been some way I could have lost." He slaps himself to end the cartoon.

== Home media ==
The film is available on the Looney Tunes Collector's Choice: Volume 3 Blu-ray.

== Succession ==
Preceded by Plop Goes the Weasel	Foghorn Leghorn cartoons 1953	Succeeded by Little Boy Boo
