= All Fowled Up =

- Directed by: Robert McKimson
- Story by: Charles McKimson; Sid Marcus
- Starring: Mel Blanc
- Music by: Carl Stalling
- Animation by: Phil DeLara; Richard Thompson; Keith Darling
- Layouts by: Bob Givens
- Backgrounds by: Richard H. Thomas
- Color process: Technicolor
- Production company: Warner Bros. Cartoons
- Distributed by: Warner Bros. Pictures
- Release date: February 19, 1955 (US)
- Running time: 6 minutes
- Language: English

All Fowled Up is a 1955 Warner Bros. Looney Tunes animated short film directed by Robert McKimson. The cartoon was released on February 19, 1955 and features Foghorn Leghorn, Henery Hawk and the Barnyard Dawg.

== Plot ==
Foghorn Leghorn, as usual, sneaks up on the Barnyard Dawg, lifts his tail and spanks him with a wooden board; when the chase begins, Foghorn leads Dawg over a well, which Dawg—when his rope reaches its limit—falls into, taking his kennel with him, after which Foghorn remarks, "love that dawg!" After Dawg bails all the water out following this, he sneaks up on Foghorn and attacks him while the rooster is asleep. Foghorn decides that he should pay a visit to Dawg and "gently break him in two with my good right arm!", but the muscles in his arm suddenly hang limp when he attempts to flex it. Realizing he's getting flabby, he decides to do some exercises to build his muscles up.

As he starts doing some push-ups, however, he sees a chicken with unusually short legs passing by. When he picks up the chicken, he uncovers Henery Hawk, who then tries to take Foghorn. In response, Foghorn sends Henery on a wild ride on a plate. It flies over to the Dawg's kennel who, panicked by the sight of "A flying saucer! Little man from Mars!", hides in his kennel which he barricades shut. Henery ends up flying through a hole in the back of the kennel, causing Dawg to burst through its roof.

Dawg picks the chicken hawk up and Henery explains that Foghorn is responsible. When Dawg informs Henery that Foghorn is a chicken as they see the rooster doing pull-ups, Dawg convinces him to put Foghorn in a cooking pot and cook him. When Henery does so, the heat from the fire causes Foghorn to rocket out in pain and crash-land into some trash, where the rooster quickly figures out Dawg was responsible for what had just happened ("I ju- I say, I just know that marble-headed mongrel is back of all this!").

Foghorn's next pranks after that end up backfiring on him: he constructs an elaborate pipeline to blow a stick of dynamite out of Dawg's kennel with the intention of blowing him up. But as he tries to light a lighter to ignite the dynamite, Dawg lights a match from his side and blows it through the pipeline over to Foghorn's end, where it ignites the fuse on the dynamite just as he lights his own lighter; the feathers of Foghorn's upper half emerge from Dawg's side of the pipe after the explosion. Foghorn is quick to pick his plumage up before wandering off, saying "Fortunately, I keep my feathers numbered for...for just such an emergency".

Later on, Foghorn takes a sleeping Dawg and his kennel, with an intention to entomb both in concrete from a cement truck. The rooster pours out a small fraction of concrete from the mixing drum to place the kennel on, as a precaution in case Dawg tries to escape; however, when Foghorn tries to pour more concrete onto it, a retractable spout comes out from the mixer which instead pours the whole load onto Foghorn. Foghorn can do nothing as the concrete hardens, leaving him frozen in a Thinker-like pose. Dawg asks him, "Well, smarty-pants, what ya gonna do now?", to which Foghorn replies "Don't, I say, don't bother me, Dawg. Can't ya see I'm thinkin'?" Henery Hawk reappears and drags this tough-to-chew dinner home with him, delivering the final punchline: "Of all the kinds of chickens in the world, I had to catch me a Plymouth Rock!"
