= Mother Was a Rooster =

Mother was a Rooster
- Directed by: Robert McKimson
- Story by: Dave Detiege
- Starring: Mel Blanc
- Edited by: Treg Brown
- Music by: Milt Franklyn
- Animation by: Ted Bonnicksen; Warren Batchelder; Keith Darling; George Grandpre
- Layouts by: Robert Gribbroek
- Backgrounds by: Robert Gribbroek
- Color process: Technicolor
- Production company: Warner Bros. Cartoons
- Distributed by: Warner Bros. Pictures
- Release date: October 20, 1962
- Running time: 7 mins
- Language: English

Mother Was a Rooster is a 1962 Warner Bros. Merrie Melodies animated short directed by Robert McKimson. The cartoon was released on October 20, 1962, and features Foghorn Leghorn and the Barnyard Dawg. The voices are performed by Mel Blanc. It is the last-released cartoon scored by Milt Franklyn; Bill Lava would take over as composer for Looney Tunes cartoons starting with Good Noose until the cartoon department's closure in 1969.

== Plot ==
Late one night, Barnyard Dawg sneaks into an ostrich hatchery to steal an egg, to place it under Foghorn Leghorn and then get him to believe that he laid the egg as a prank. Foghorn awakens and falls for it. When the egg doesn't immediately hatch, Barnyard Dawg decides to speed up the process by bonking Foghorn on the head with a mallet. The egg hatches an ostrich chick, to which Foghorn immediately warms up to as his own son, oblivious to the fact that the chick is an ostrich and even going as far as calling himself a mother. Foghorn proudly shows off his "son" to Barnyard Dawg as a gesture of goodwill, but Barnyard Dawg insults the ostrich. The ostrich buries his head in the ground in shame.

After an attempt to get back at Barnyard Dawg fails, which involves an anvil hanging from a tree while tied to a rope, the plot shifts to Foghorn's attempts to bond with his son, showing him how to play various sporting activities such as baseball and football. Despite these efforts to build the bird's self-esteem and forget Barnyard Dawg's maliciousness, the dog continually and unmercifully mocks the ostrich. The ostrich buries his head with each insult, agitating Foghorn even more. Finally, Foghorn has enough of the bullying and decides to defend his son's honor in a boxing match.

The bout takes place in a makeshift ring, contained beneath the farm's wooden water tower. When Barnyard Dawg decides to cheat, Foghorn decides to forget the rules and — using a loose floor plank as a catapult — hurls his foe into the bottom of the water tank. Barnyard Dawg returns the favor, and the process repeats several times until the tank becomes dislodged and crashes on top of the ring, leaving both Foghorn and Barnyard Dawg with their own heads buried in the ground. The ostrich who had been watching the match remarks: "They've left me all alone. Where did everybody go?"

== Home media ==
This short is available on disc 1 of the Looney Tunes Collector's Vault: Volume 2 Blu-ray set.

== See also ==
- List of American films of 1962

Preceded by The Slick Chick	Foghorn Leghorn cartoons 1962	Succeeded by Banty Raids
