= The Dixie Fryer =

- Directed by: Robert McKimson
- Written by: Tedd Pierce
- Starring: Mel Blanc; Daws Butler (uncredited)
- Edited by: Treg Brown
- Music by: Milt Franklyn
- Animation by: Ted Bonnicksen; Warren Batchelder; Tom Ray; George Grandpre
- Layouts by: Robert Givens
- Backgrounds by: William Butler
- Color process: Technicolor
- Production company: Warner Bros. Cartoons
- Distributed by: Warner Bros. Pictures
- Release date: September 24, 1960
- Running time: 6:11
- Language: English

The Dixie Fryer is a Warner Bros. Merrie Melodies cartoon short directed by Robert McKimson. The cartoon was released on September 24, 1960, and features Foghorn Leghorn.

== Plot ==
Foghorn Leghorn is seen flying south for the winter, though he is not actually flying himself but hitching a ride on a basket that is being pulled by a flock of ducks. He then smells magnolia trees and figures that he is in the south, and hops out of the basket using an umbrella as a parachute, while also managing to bring a suitcase that contains a lounging chair and a mint julep. In a tree, two hungry chicken hawks, "Elvis" and "Pappy", spot Foghorn Leghorn and announce that they will be having him for dinner.

Following a pattern in previous Looney Tunes/Merrie Melodies cartoons, Foghorn soon realizes that the chicken hawks are not extending an invitation but want to "eat" him for dinner. Foghorn tries a series of maneuvers to evade the chicken hawks, including a pistol duel which ends up backfiring on him, knocking his beak off ("first, I say, first time someone shot my mouth off!"). Then, Foghorn leads his two adversaries into a cellar, pretending a tornado is nearby, and nails it shut to trap them. However, he hears a noise and discovers that there is a tornado approaching, but is unable to unlock the cellar in time, getting caught in it. When the tornado dies down, we see Foghorn rendered featherless (wearing a pair of polka-dotted boxer shorts), so he remedies this by putting on a new set of feathers (ACME Instant Feathers).

Then, Elvis and Pappy break out of the cellar and continue their pursuit of the rooster. Foghorn then leads his predators into a shack containing explosives and shuts the door. The chicken hawks cannot see and Foghorn steps out of the shack. Then Elvis sticks his head out of the shack and asks Foghorn for a match. Foghorn obliges, the shack explodes, and the chicken hawks are blown back into their nest. Pappy then decides that they must settle on (literally) black-eyed peas.

And with that, Foghorn decides to go back to enjoying his vacation, which he calls a "Southern exposure", then turns about to reveal his buttocks (with the boxer shorts) to the audience, revealing that all his tail feathers have been blown off from the explosion, unbeknownst to him.

== Home media ==
This short is available on disc 1 of the Looney Tunes Collector's Vault: Volume 1 Blu-ray set.

== Succession ==
Preceded by A Broken Leghorn	Foghorn Leghorn cartoons 1961	Succeeded by Strangled Eggs
