= The Squawkin' Hawk =

1942 film by Charles M. Jones

- Title card
- Directed by: Charles M. Jones
- Story by: Michael Maltese
- Produced by: Leon Schlesinger
- Starring: Kent Rogers; Sara Berner; Tedd Pierce (all uncredited)
- Music by: Carl W. Stalling
- Animation by: Phil Monroe
- Color process: Technicolor
- Production company: Leon Schlesinger Productions
- Distributed by: Warner Bros. Pictures
- Release date: August 8, 1942
- Running time: 7 min
- Country: United States
- Language: English

The Squawkin' Hawk is a 1942 American animated comedy short film directed by Charles M. Jones. The short was released on August 8, 1942. It is part of the Merrie Melodies series and the first appearance of the then-unnamed Henery Hawk, who would become prominent after Robert McKimson reworked him into a foil of Foghorn Leghorn. It was re-released as a "Blue Ribbon" reissue in 1948, rendering the original film lost, though Michael Maltese kept the title card.

== Plot ==
Chick N. Hawk's son Junior wants a chicken for dinner due to his status as a chicken hawk. His mother insists he eat a worm, or he will get no supper. Junior refuses, much to the worm's relief. Junior's mother puts him to bed and tells him to "go right to sleep". Henery sneaks out his house at bedtime, then goes to the chicken coop and soon finds a rooster and his hen, Hazel, who has a panic reaction at the sound of the words "chicken hawk". The rooster chases him until his mother spots him and sends him home. He is again told to eat a worm and again refuses and says he wants a "chicken", at which point the worm gives him a big kiss on the beak.

== Reception ==
The Film Daily called the short "Good", saying, "The adventures of a baby chicken hawk who goes out prowling for chicken after refusing to sup on worms are treated with loads of fun in this Technicolor short."

== Home media ==
This short is available on disc 1 of the Looney Tunes Collector's Vault: Volume 1 Blu-ray set.
