= Henhouse Henery =

- Directed by: Robert McKimson
- Story by: Warren Foster
- Starring: Mel Blanc
- Music by: Carl Stalling
- Animation by: Manny Gould; John Carey; Charles McKimson; Pete Burness; Phil DeLara
- Layouts by: Cornett Wood
- Backgrounds by: Richard H. Thomas
- Color process: Technicolor
- Production company: Warner Bros. Cartoons
- Distributed by: Warner Bros. Pictures; The Vitaphone Corporation
- Release date: July 2, 1949 (USA)
- Running time: 7 minutes
- Language: English

Henhouse Henery is a 1949 Warner Bros. Looney Tunes theatrical short directed by Robert McKimson. The cartoon was released on July 2, 1949, and features Foghorn Leghorn, Henery Hawk and the Barnyard Dawg.

== Plot ==
The story beginning with Henery Hawk on a quest to catch a chicken. In the barnyard, Foghorn Leghorn is tormenting Barnyard Dawg, first by setting a fake fire which causes Dawg to run up a ladder and over it, then by stuffing a ball in the Dawg's mouth to silence him. Henery, seeing Foghorn, hits him on the head with a hammer, then does it again a second time. When Henery tells Foghorn that he wants to catch a chicken, the much larger Foggy advises him to "start small and work up." Henery tries to remove a hen (and her egg) from the barnyard, but is stopped by Foghorn.

As Henery contemplates his next move, Foghorn lures the Dawg out of his house with a Marotte (a jester's head on a stick), and when the Dawg reaches the rope limit, Foghorn paints his tongue green. Foggy spots Henery and points him to a duck and her ducklings, telling Henery that they are chickens. Henery follows the ducks into the water and almost drowns until Foghorn saves him. Foghorn then paints a fence to make it appear as if a gate is open, and spanks the Dawg with a stick in order to get the Dawg to chase him. Dawg falls for the trap, but then confronts Foghorn at the end of the fence, Dawg having removed his collar. While he is being chased, Foghorn chops down a tree and carries it into a workshop to fashion it into a baseball bat. He barely has time to admire his work before the Dawg shoves him aside and seizes the bat from Foghorn and chases him, but Foghorn escapes by hiding in a trash can.

Once he eludes Dawg, Foghorn sees Henery and tells him to find a young chicken that is still in his shell, and directs Henery to a nearby turtle, who rebuffs Henery's attempt to catch him. The Dawg, still carrying the baseball bat, sees Henery and they scheme to lure Foghorn with a fake chicken trap, which is a rope tied to a tree. Foghorn falls for the ruse, saying that the trap can be avoided by a "smart chicken." Foghorn then gets caught in the real trap which is a hole next to the fake trap. Henery ties a rope around Foghorn's neck and releases the tree trap which causes Foghorn to be flung into the ground several times. The story concludes with Henery pulling an unconscious Foghorn away by the neck with Dawg remarking to Henery, "Heh heh heh. A 'smart chicken', eh?", and Henery stating (to the audience) in Foghorn Leghorn style, "I don't want-- I say I don't want a 'smart' chicken, I want him", and humming "Camptown Races".

== Home media ==
This short is available on the Looney Tunes Collector's Choice: Volume 4 Blu-ray.
