= Pullet Surprise =

- Promotional poster
- Directed by: Darrell Van Citters
- Story by: Stephen Fossati; Darrell Van Citters; Dean Wellins
- Produced by: Chuck Jones; Linda Jones Clough; Stephen A. Fossati
- Starring: Frank Gorshin; Stan Freberg
- Edited by: Julie Ann Lau
- Music by: Cameron Patrick; Dominick Certo; J. Eric Schmidt
- Animation by: Tom Decker; Patrick Gleeson; Dean Wellins; Duane Gretsky; Bill Snelgrove; Claude Raynes; Greg Whittaker; Warren O'Neill; Herman Sharaf; Cory Wilson; Joe Achorn; Edy Benjamin; Munir Bhatti; John Hinshelwood; Martin Hopkins; Maurice Noble
- Layouts by: Bob Givens
- Backgrounds by: Jill Petrilak
- Production companies: Warner Bros. Family Entertainment; Warner Bros. Animation; Chuck Jones Film Productions
- Distributed by: Warner Bros. Pictures
- Release date: March 26, 1997; (with Cats Don't Dance)
- Running time: 6:54
- Country: United States
- Language: English

Pullet Surprise is a 1997 Looney Tunes short released in theaters with Cats Don't Dance. It was produced by Chuck Jones Film Productions. It is notable for being the first theatrical released Foghorn Leghorn short since Banty Raids in 1963. and the first one directed by someone else after Robert McKimson's death. It is one of three Looney Tunes shorts to feature Frank Gorshin voicing a character (the other two being Superior Duck and From Hare to Eternity), namely Foghorn Leghorn, while Stan Freberg reprises his role as Pete Puma.

== Plot ==
Pete Puma attempts to steal from Foghorn Leghorn's henhouse. Foghorn outwits Pete by sending him on wild goose chases for exotic chickens, including a Venezuelan Racing Chicken, an Irish Wrestling Chicken and a Mongolian Disappearing Chicken. Despite Foghorn's tricks, Pete manages to snatch a chicken. Foghorn retaliates by tricking Pete into various traps (such as tricking him into dancing and dropping an anvil on him) but is ultimately defeated by a real Irish Wrestling Chicken, leading Foghorn to quip that he's sure glad he didn't show Pete the Norwegian Exploding Chicken.
