= Lovelorn Leghorn =

- Directed by: Robert McKimson
- Story by: Tedd Pierce
- Starring: Mel Blanc; Bea Benaderet (uncredited)
- Music by: Music Score: Eugene Poddany; Orchestrations: Milt Franklyn
- Animation by: Phil DeLara; Charles McKimson; Rod Scribner; Emery Hawkins; Additional animation: John Carey (uncr.)
- Layouts by: Cornett Wood
- Backgrounds by: Richard H. Thomas
- Color process: Technicolor
- Production company: Warner Bros. Cartoons
- Distributed by: Warner Bros. Pictures; The Vitaphone Corporation
- Release date: September 8, 1951 (USA)
- Running time: 7 minutes
- Language: English

Lovelorn Leghorn is a 1951 Warner Bros. Looney Tunes cartoon directed by Robert McKimson. The cartoon was released on September 8, 1951, and features Foghorn Leghorn, Miss Prissy and the Barnyard Dawg.

== Plot ==
Miss Prissy is trying to land a husband. All the other hens laugh, and make fun of her, saying she couldn't catch a husband with a bear trap. When they ask Prissy if she has something to clunk him on the head with, Prissy hears them, says "Yes", and pulls out a rolling pin. And with that, she leaves the coop ignoring the other hens laughing.

Meanwhile, Foghorn Leghorn is taking a nap in the sun. The Barnyard Dawg sees his chance, and splashes cold water, thus waking the rooster up with a shock and scream. When he demands who's responsible, the dog reveals himself by poking him in the shoulder. Just when the rooster's about to catch him, he closes Foggy's umbrella on him. Foghorn then says the popular line as the dog walks away, "'Course ya know, this means war!" meaning their battle has already started.

Miss Prissy then catches up to Foghorn as he is sharpening an axe on a wheel. She whacks him on the head with her rolling pin, which causes him to yell at her, "Now what, I say, what's the big idea bashing me on the noggin with a rolling pin? Clunk enough people and we'll have a nation of lumpheads!". After Prissy cries, Foghorn consoles her and ropes her into thinking the Dawg is a rooster in disguise.

Taking a melon over to the Dawg, Prissy then entices him to chase her, resulting in the dog getting the melon smashed on his head and kicked like a football by Foghorn. When Prissy tries to get the 'dog suit' off of Dawg ("Hey, wait a minute! What are ya tryin' to do? Pull my skin offa me?!"), he explains to her that she needs to trap Foghorn, and he whispers to her how to build a trap. When trying to help Prissy put a bowling ball in a ramp, Foghorn inadvertently triggers the trap, which turns into out to be a Rube Goldberg machine, eventually knocking Foghorn out cold with a cannonball.

Prissy then returns to the other hens with Foghorn in a market basket, where he is still knocked silly. The cartoon irises out with Prissy hugging her new 'husband' after he says his usual catchphrase, when the hens ask Prissy if she has a husband in the basket.
