= Strangled Eggs =

- Directed by: Robert McKimson
- Story by: Tedd Pierce
- Starring: Mel Blanc
- Edited by: Treg Brown
- Music by: Milt Franklyn
- Animation by: Ted Bonnicksen; Warren Batchelder; George Grandpré; Tom Ray
- Layouts by: Robert Gribbroek
- Backgrounds by: Robert Singer
- Color process: Technicolor
- Production company: Warner Bros. Cartoons
- Distributed by: Warner Bros. Pictures
- Release date: March 18, 1961
- Running time: 7 minutes
- Language: English

Strangled Eggs is a Warner Bros. Merrie Melodies cartoon short directed by Robert McKimson. The cartoon was released on March 18, 1961, and features Foghorn Leghorn, Henery Hawk and Miss Prissy. The voices are performed by Mel Blanc. This was the only cartoon to star both Miss Prissy and Henery Hawk.

== Plot ==
Short of food, Foghorn Leghorn tries to court with Miss Prissy in hopes of getting food for the winter. While trying to court her, there is a knock on the door. It is a baby basket containing Henery Hawk, posing as an orphan chick in his latest attempt to infiltrate the barnyard and obtain a chicken to eat. Foghorn believes that Henery Hawk is going to be trouble, but Miss Prissy decides she wants to adopt the pseudo-chick as her "son." To make peace with Miss Prissy, he consents to help Henery become a "real" chicken.

Several gags then occur as Foghorn tries to teach Henery how to be a chicken (actually, thinly disguised attempts to kill off his foe), but such attempts are unsuccessful.

1. Teaching him how to crow on top of a barn. Henery snags a rope around the rooster's neck and drops Foghorn into a boiling pot of water, which causes him to leap out in pain, his lower half burnt. Foghorn then reiterates his claim that "[Henery]'s gotta go".
2. A grenade disguised as an egg. Foghorn sets the little chickenhawk on top of the "egg" and lies in wait in the barn's side to pull the pin with a string. Unfortunately, he pulls too hard and the whole grenade is consequently ensnared around him, and it blows up just as Foghorn vainly tries to put the pin back in place.
3. Hidden landmines, which Foghorn hopes will blow Henery up. His nemesis bites his finger (after a few attempts) and provokes him on a chase... through the minefield. Henery runs safely past, but the poor rooster blows himself up repeatedly as he runs after Henery.

Eventually, Foghorn believes that if Henery is going to be a chicken, then he is going to be a chicken hawk - so he flies after Henery with the intent of catching him. Henery flees to the safety of Miss Prissy, who slams the door on Foghorn. Dazed, Foghorn says "Like my - I say, like my pappy used to say: Shoemaker, stick to your last. And this is my last."

== See also ==
- List of American films of 1961

| Preceded by The Dixie Fryer | Foghorn Leghorn cartoons 1961 | Succeeded by The Slick Chick |
