= The EGGcited Rooster =

- Directed by: Robert McKimson
- Story by: Tedd Pierce
- Starring: Mel Blanc
- Music by: Carl Stalling
- Animation by: Rod Scribner; Phil DeLara; Charles McKimson; Herman Cohen
- Layouts by: Robert Givens
- Backgrounds by: Richard H. Thomas
- Color process: Technicolor
- Production company: Warner Bros. Cartoons
- Distributed by: Warner Bros. Pictures
- Release date: October 4, 1952
- Running time: 6:30
- Language: English

The EGGcited Rooster is a 1952 Warner Bros. Merrie Melodies cartoon directed by Robert McKimson. The cartoon was released on October 4, 1952, and features Foghorn Leghorn, Henery Hawk and the Barnyard Dawg.

== Plot ==
The story begins with Foghorn being forced by his domineering wife to remain in the henhouse to sit on an egg that is about to hatch while his wife goes out to play bridge. The hen warns Foghorn not to leave the egg unattended or he'll get a lot of lumps on his head, to which Foghorn replies: "No, dreamboat" but then changes "dreamboat" to "tugboat" when the hen is out of earshot. The Dawg sees that Foghorn cannot leave and takes advantage of the situation by lobbing a watermelon at him, which breaks over Foghorn's head. As Foghorn gets up to retaliate, the Dawg states that Foghorn better not leave the egg, or the Dawg can tell Foghorn's "old lady" that he left. Foghorn then figures that he needs to find someone to sit on the egg for him, so that he can exact revenge on the Dawg. Henery, dressed as an Indian, is hunting for chickens when he spots Foghorn in the henhouse. Henery shoots him with a toy arrow, causing Foghorn to shriek. Foghorn turns the tables on Henery by telling him that he needs to hunt a chicken his own size, like the one in the unhatched egg. Foghorn leads Henery to believe that he can have the chicken once it hatches, but tells Henery he needs to sit on the egg first to keep it warm. Free from his commitment, Foghorn goes to the Dawg's house and spanks him with a wooden plank, then as the Dawg attempts to give chase, Foghorn traps him in the stocks and then places light bulbs around the Dawg's head. Foghorn then flips and electrical switch and the lights begin to blink, then the words "Eat At Joe's" appear in the Dawg's nose, as if it were a neon sign.

Foghorn returns to the henhouse only to see Henery attempting to hatch the egg by breaking it with a wooden mallet. Foghorn stops Henery, but absorbs a blow to his head in the process. Henery tells Foghorn that he is tired of waiting and wants a chicken now. Foghorn speculates that the egg in the nest is a "slow-hatching egg" and offers a faster hatching one to Henery. The faster egg is in reality a grenade disguised to look like an egg (Foghorn produces it from a box that says "ACME HEN GRENADE"). Foghorn tells Henery to slip the egg/grenade underneath the Dawg so it will hatch. Henery complies, and the egg explodes, leaving the Dawg on his back with a breakfast egg on his stomach. The Dawg tells Henery that they were the victims of a joke by Foghorn, and the Dawg suggests that he and Henery play a joke back on Foghorn. The Dawg has Henery lure Foghorn away from the nest so that Henery can steal the egg and bring it to the Dawg, who will then tell Foghorn's wife that Foghorn has "deserted the nest." Henery brings the egg to the Dawg, who then walks to a telephone to call Mrs. Leghorn at her bridge game. A chase occurs where the Dawg, Henery, and Foghorn are all trying to obtain the egg as it passes between them. Mrs. Leghorn emerges from her bridge club with a large rolling pin, on the warpath, and retrieves the egg herself after hitting Foghorn with the rolling pin. The cartoon ends with Henery threatening to scalp Foghorn with a small tomahawk, and then carrying out the threat when the latter doesn't believe that the tiny tomahawk can hurt anyone; Foghorn says, as he puts his removed scalp back on: "Of course, I could be wrong.".

== Home media ==
This short is available on disc 1 of the Looney Tunes Collector's Vault: Volume 2 Blu-ray set.
