= The Slick Chick =

- Directed by: Robert McKimson
- Story by: Tedd Pierce
- Starring: Mel Blanc; Julie Bennett
- Edited by: Treg Brown
- Music by: Milt Franklyn
- Animation by: Ted Bonnicksen; Warren Batchelder; Keith Darling; George Grandpre
- Layouts by: Robert Gribbroek
- Backgrounds by: Robert Gribbroek
- Color process: Technicolor
- Production company: Warner Bros. Cartoons
- Distributed by: Warner Bros. Pictures
- Release date: July 21, 1962
- Running time: 7 mins
- Language: English

The Slick Chick is a 1962 Warner Bros. Looney Tunes animated short directed by Robert McKimson. The cartoon was released on July 21, 1962, and features Foghorn Leghorn. The voices are performed by Mel Blanc and Julie Bennett.

The cartoon is an adaptation of the Mean Widdle Kid radio programs (and later, television skits) starring comedian Red Skelton. The main antagonist in the film—Junior, a delinquent chick who causes trouble for Foghorn—is based on Skelton's character; one of Junior's catch phrases ("He don't know me very well, do he?") is the Mean Widdle Kid's signature saying.

== Plot ==
Foghorn Leghorn is filing his nails when Widow Hen comes by and asks a curmudgeonly old rooster, called Mr. Cackle, to watch her young son, Junior, while she goes out. Mr. Cackle refuses, claiming Junior is destructive, disrespectful and incorrigible ("ME babysit with HIM?! You must be joshing!"); in fact, Mr. Cackle calls Junior "that Monster of Yourn" and says Junior "makes Dennis the Menace look like an angel". Mr. Cackle also points out that Junior is "Bad, Bad, BAD!". Foghorn overhears the proceedings and - hoping to silence Mr. Cackle from accusing Junior of things, and prove a point that " there ain't no such thing as a bad boy" - volunteers to watch Junior, who snickers: "Oooh, he don't know me vewy well, do he?". Just as Widow Hen goes, Foghorn promises that he and Junior will be friends, but Junior deliberately pokes Foghorn's bottom with a needle. Foghorn attempts to strangle Junior, but Mr. Cackle laughs at Foghorn's expense. Foghorn defends Junior by saying he was merely being "playful" and goes off with Junior to look after him. "Lotsa luck, Foggy", calls out Mr. Cackle, "you're gonna NEED it!!"

Foghorn first takes Junior to a box full of toys to play with while he takes a nap, but Junior scoffs and, after declaring them "widdle kids' stuff", decides to cause trouble. First, upon finding a cement mixer in the barn, Junior decides to call a false alarm, which leads to Foghorn landing in the cement mixer; he comes out posed as Rodin's "The Thinker" statue (Junior: "I'm not weawwy a scuwptor. It's just me mean widdle hobby!"). Foghorn recovers and threatens to report Junior's misbehavior to Widow Hen, but Junior counters by warning that he'll tell his mother that Foghorn is still "booking the horses". Foghorn tries to laugh this off, and does - but Junior says "And they're off!", causing Foghorn to briefly mimic watching a horse race, only to realize in shock that he's been tricked again.

Junior leaves the farm while Foghorn is taking a nap in his hammock, and goes into a weather station to find a weather balloon. Junior ties the harness around Foghorn and puts the rooster into orbit. Eventually, Foghorn awakens and panics when he realizes he is flying high above the farm. When he demands that Junior help get him down, Junior shoots an arrow to pop the balloon. Foghorn falls to the earth, landing on a bed spring. After a quick bounce, Junior decides that might not work and instead gives him a landing pad... a landmine.

Once Foghorn regains his senses (his de-feathered body reveals blue shorts), his mind is made up about Junior: "I still say he ain't a bad boy. He's a WORST. WORST, THAT IS!"

== See also ==
- List of American films of 1962

| Preceded by Strangled Eggs | Foghorn Leghorn cartoons 1962 | Succeeded by Mother Was a Rooster |
