= Walky Talky Hawky =

1946 film by Robert McKimson

- Blue Ribbon reissue title card
- Directed by: Robert McKimson
- Story by: Warren Foster
- Starring: Mel Blanc (all voices)
- Music by: Carl Stalling
- Animation by: Richard Bickenbach; Arthur Davis; Cal Dalton; Don Williams; Anatole Kirsanoff
- Layouts by: Cornett Wood
- Backgrounds by: Richard H. Thomas
- Color process: Technicolor
- Production company: Warner Bros. Cartoons
- Distributed by: Warner Bros. Pictures
- Release date: August 31, 1946
- Running time: 7:00
- Language: English

Walky Talky Hawky is a 1946 Warner Bros. Merrie Melodies theatrical short directed by Robert McKimson. The cartoon was released on August 31, 1946, and features Henery Hawk and Foghorn Leghorn. This is the first appearance of both Foghorn Leghorn and the Barnyard Dawg.

== Plot ==
Henery Hawk discusses his cravings with his father, who then reveals the reason behind them: "Your mother and I are outcasts, hated and hunted because of what we are: chicken hawks. And you, you, Henery, you're a chicken hawk too. And like all chicken hawks, you crave to eat – a chicken." More enthusiastic than his father, Henery sets out to find a chicken. Meanwhile, in a barnyard, the Barnyard Dawg deliberately throws a watermelon on an unsuspecting Foghorn Leghorn, who is done filing his nails ("Every day it's the same thing!", complains Foghorn). As payback, just as the Dawg goes to sleep, Foghorn spanks the Dawg with a paddle, angering him into chasing Foghorn, but his leash stops him from going further. To add insult to injury, Foghorn backhandedly slaps the angrily barking Dawg, while yelling at him to "AHH SHADDAP!!!"

Henery meets Foghorn, who, seeing the hawk as a potential pawn against the Dawg, convinces Henery that he is a horse, while the Dawg is a chicken, and Henery goes up to the Dawg and bites his tail, causing the Dawg to wake up from his nap in pain. The Dawg grabs Henery and growls at him. Henery warns the Dawg, "Are you coming quietly or do I have to muss ya up?!", but the Dawg chases Henery, but gets choked on the leash again and falls again while Foghorn whacks the Dawg in the head like he is playing croquet with croquet mallet and runs with the Dawg angrily barking again, only with a headache. Henery is still running, but Foghorn tells Henery not to give up, and Henery literally carries the dog house with the Dawg in it like a train while the Dawg investigates with a mirror, sees Henery, and lifts up his house and gives chase, but is choked and falls again and Foghorn puts a knight's helmet on the Dawg and whacks the Dawg in the side of the head many times, causing the Dawg's head to literally shake inside.

Foghorn soon gives Henery an idea to "outsmart" the "foxy chicken". Henery lures the Dawg out with music, causing him to suffer mishaps culminating in him landing on a rollerskate. When the Dawg surrenders and asks Henery what he is looking for, Henery tells the Dawg his intentions ("You're a chicken, I'm a chicken hawk, and I'm gonna eat chicken!"). The Dawg realizes he has been the victim of Foghorn's prank and points out that Foghorn is the one he should be going after, being a chicken. Foghorn tries to deflect his argument by accusing the Dawg ("Don't you call me, I say don't you call ME a chicken, you...chicken!"), but by then, Henery realizes he has been tricked ("Hubba hubba hubba!", states Henery).

Henery pays Foghorn back by releasing the Dawg on Foghorn, who barely manages to escape and is chased by the angry Dawg into a barn, where an actual horse forcibly ejects them, clunking their heads together in the process. The two foes, shaking hands to prove solidarity, re-enter to double-team the horse. Henery marches in after them and, in a few seconds, captures Foghorn, the Dawg, and the horse, with the hapless rooster vainly trying to escape. Mimicking Foghorn, he tells the camera that "One of these things, I say, one of these things, has got to be a chicken!" as he walks off with his prizes.

== Production ==
After Robert McKimson was promoted to director in late 1944, writer Warren Foster developed a story about a large rooster, a barnyard dog and a chicken hawk (a role later assigned to Chuck Jones' character Henery Hawk). Dialogue was recorded on January 13, 1945.

== Reception ==
Animation producer Paul Dini writes, "Bugs and Porky – indeed, most of the classic Warner Bros. characters – underwent years of refinement before they became stars. Not so Foghorn Leghorn, who exploded fully formed and bellowing in Walky Talky Hawky. Though he soon lost his realistic chicken squawks, Foghorn retained his bellicose personality and barrel-bellied design for the remainder of his theatrical career... McKimson's comic equation of rooster plus board plus dog's butt may lack the poetic elegance of comic-strip artist George Herriman's mouse plus brick plus Krazy Kat's head. However, the merry brutality worked well enough to ensure seventeen years of constant laughs – and in the case of Walky Talky Hawky, an Academy Award nomination."

== Awards ==
The film was nominated for an Academy Award for Short Subjects, Cartoons, losing to MGM's Tom and Jerry short, The Cat Concerto.

== Home media ==
The short is included, digitally remastered, in the Looney Tunes Golden Collection: Volume 3 DVD set, the Warner Bros. Home Entertainment Academy Awards Animation Collection DVD set, and the Looney Tunes Platinum Collection: Volume 3 Blu-ray and DVD sets. It is also part of Bugs Bunny: Superstar Part 2 in the Looney Tunes Golden Collection: Volume 4.

== See also ==
- 1946 in film
