= Fox-Terror =

1957 film by Robert McKimson

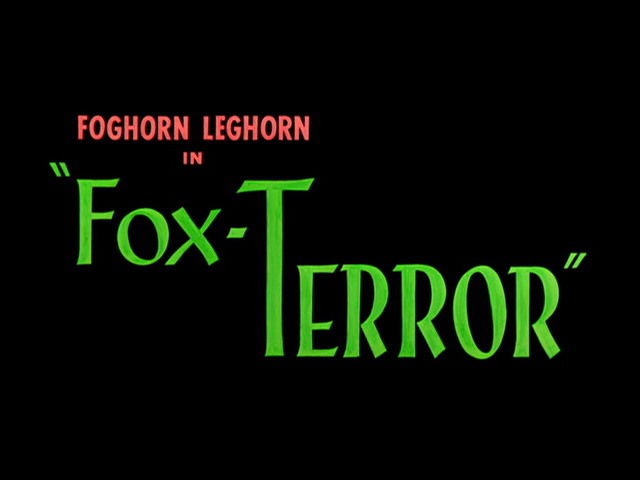
- Title card
- Directed by: Robert McKimson
- Story by: Michael Maltese
- Starring: Mel Blanc
- Edited by: Treg Brown
- Music by: Carl Stalling; Milt Franklyn
- Animation by: Keith Darling; George Grandpré; Ted Bonnicksen
- Layouts by: Robert Gribbroek
- Backgrounds by: Bob Majors
- Color process: Technicolor
- Production company: Warner Bros. Cartoons
- Distributed by: Warner Bros. Pictures
- Release date: May 11, 1957
- Running time: 6:48
- Language: English

Fox-Terror is a 1957 Warner Bros. Merrie Melodies animated short directed by Robert McKimson. The cartoon was released on May 11, 1957, and features Foghorn Leghorn and the Barnyard Dawg. The title is a play on the dog breed name "Fox Terrier".

By the time of this cartoon's release, the Stephen Foster song "Camptown Races" has been established as Foghorn Leghorn's theme; in other cartoons Foghorn normally hums the verse, but in this cartoon he sings specially-written lyrics about fishing.

The cartoon also briefly paid homage to the then-wildly popular genre of television quiz shows, particularly The $64,000 Question which, like many other quiz shows of the day, would soon become embroiled in scandal and be taken off the air a year later.

== Plot ==
A fox scampers away from the henhouse when a young rooster rings the alarm bell. Barnyard Dawg arrives, but sees no fox, so he thinks the rooster just rang the bell because he wanted a drink of water. When he sees Foghorn Leghorn leave to go fishing, the fox disguises himself and suggests that he go hunting instead and bring the dog with him. Foggy likes this idea, so he grabs a shotgun and ties a rope around Dawg's neck and drags him away. The fox heads for the henhouse, but the young rooster rings the alarm again. Dawg runs back, dragging Foghorn behind him, but again the fox scampers away. Dawg only sees the rooster ringing the bell and assumes he's just thirsty again.

The fox then pretends to be a quiz show host, pushing Foghorn into an isolation booth and asking him the "$64 Million Question", "What poem mentions the colors red and blue?"; the fox instructs Foghorn to push a buzzer in the booth when he comes to 'red' and press it again when he comes to 'blue'. Foghorn guesses "Roses are red...", pushing the buzzer once, detonating one of two firecrackers in Dawg's mouth (causing him to lose three of his teeth), but Dawg, walking off-camera, grabs the buzzer and guesses the other half of the question, "... and violets are blue!", pressing the buzzer the second time, setting off the other firecracker that he stuffed in Foghorn's mouth. Meanwhile, the fox returns to the henhouse. The young rooster again pulls the alarm, and the fox flees before Dawg arrives. Again, seeing no fox, Dawg dumps a whole bucket of water on the little rooster.

The fox unpacks a "Magic Folding Box" and lures Dawg into it with a bone. When the dog is inside, the fox folds the box into a tiny package, then disguises himself as a swami and sells it as a "lucky charm" to Foghorn, who is on his way to go fishing again. Foghorn throws it over his shoulder for luck and it lands in the well. Dawg emerges battered and bruised and he folds Foghorn into a tiny package and throws him into the well. The young rooster pulls the alarm again. Having had enough, an enraged Dawg tries to hit him with a mallet. However, the young rooster beat him to it, as he hits Dawg in the head as payback for dumping water on him earlier. After Foghorn climbs out of the well, he and Dawg have a talk and they finally realize the fox has been tricking them both with disguises and ruses. Dawg is ready to give the fox what for, but Foghorn stops him, claiming he has a better idea.

Later, when the young rooster sees the fox again, he goes to pull the alarm. But this time, the fox is one step ahead of him and he cuts the cord before the rooster can pull it. But as the fox tauntingly holds the cord, the young rooster pulls and it causes the alarm to go off. As the fox hides behind a bush, Foghorn and Dawg are seen wearing disguises and give the fox a taste of his own medicine.

== See also ==
- List of American films of 1957

== Home media ==
Fox-Terror is available on Looney Tunes Super Stars' Foghorn Leghorn & Friends: Barnyard Bigmouth, and on Looney Tunes Collector's Vault: Volume 3.

Preceded by Raw! Raw! Rooster!	Foghorn Leghorn cartoons 1957	Succeeded by Feather Bluster
