= Banty Raids =

- Title card
- Directed by: Robert McKimson
- Story by: Robert McKimson; Nick Bennion
- Starring: Mel Blanc
- Edited by: Treg Brown
- Music by: Bill Lava
- Animation by: George Grandpré; Keith Darling; Ted Bonnicksen; Warren Batchelder
- Layouts by: Robert Gribbroek
- Backgrounds by: Robert Gribbroek
- Color process: Technicolor
- Production company: Warner Bros. Cartoons
- Distributed by: Warner Bros. Pictures
- Release date: June 29, 1963
- Running time: 6:00
- Language: English

Banty Raids is a 1963 Warner Bros. Merrie Melodies animated short directed by Robert McKimson. The cartoon was released on June 29, 1963, and features Foghorn Leghorn and the Barnyard Dawg. The voices were performed by Mel Blanc.

This cartoon marked the last "classic-era" cartoon featuring Foghorn Leghorn and Barnyard Dawg. Foghorn would make a cameo appearance in False Hare in 1964, but his next appearance after that was in 1980's The Yolk's on You.

== Plot ==
A curmudgeon old rooster expels a young, pint-sized (bantam, aka "banty") rooster — who fancies himself as a hip beatnik and ladies' man — from the barnyard after repeatedly disturbing the peace with rock music. The banty, after regaining his senses (and shooting his guitar), sees the neighboring barnyard is full of hens and is immediately overcome with lust.

But to gain access to the barnyard, he needs to get past its superintendent, Foghorn Leghorn. The young rooster disguises himself as a baby and Foghorn takes the bait. Adopting him as his "son," Foghorn immediately shows the beatnik how to keep Barnyard Dawg in his place, using a rubber band contraption to punch the dog square in the head before tossing him in a garbage can.

The beatnik rooster constantly sneaks away to dance with the hens and kiss them. Foghorn eventually catches on that his young visitor is attracted to the "fairer sex", and decides to run a test on him. He shows the beatnik pictures of the Dawg, himself and a lady hen in an evening dress, the latter of which gets a wild reaction out of the banty ("Yahoo! Wildsville!") and confirms Foggy's suspicions ("Hah, just like I thought! He's wacky over females!"). The Barnyard Dawg also learns of this and, seeing an opportunity to get back at Foghorn, offers to aid the hip rooster. After the hen-obsessed rooster agrees with him, the dog has him stand in a nearby circle and sends a toy tank to seek out Foggy ("Uh oh. Looks like one of that silly dawg's booby traps!").

After dodging a shot from the tank, Foghorn is then kicked violently by a bull (the real target of the tank), launching and trapping him in a converted thresher retooled for the sole purpose of transforming Foghorn into a hen forever. After Foggy lands in the thresher, he disappears from view as a rope laden spindle revolves at high speed, ensnaring Foggy within an undetermined length of rope. Once Foggy pops out of the thresher landing on a conveyor belt, his arms are bound to his sides giving Foghorn a bustline, and his beak was also tied shut to prevent speech and to alter said beak into a fluted shape, adding to his new henlike appearance.

While Foggy rides the conveyor belt, he is subjected to a "makeover" which begins when eyelids with blue eyeshadow and long thick eyelashes are literally glued on, continues when a plunger with red lipstick smacks into Foggy's beak, coating his beak with the lipstick, a blue bonnet with a redhead wig is put onto his head, and ends when Foggy drops headfirst into a blue dress, bounces off a makeshift trampoline (a corset), gently floating down to earth as his dress functions like an umbrella a minute later, the busty redheaded hen landing between the dog, and the banty rooster, as his feet slide into a pair of blue high heels.

The banty rooster demands an impromptu wedding ceremony and Barnyard Dog readily obliges, donning a preacher's hat and declaring them husband and wife, "or somethin...". Foggy tries to protest ("But I'm a rooster!", which the beatnik rooster doesn't understand because Foggy's speech is obscured by his beak being tied shut); the banty rooster however, is willing to accept his shortcomings. Mimicking the final scene of Some Like It Hot the banty closes the cartoon carrying Foggy away, telling him "Don't let it bug ya ma'mm. Like, we can't all be perfect!"

== See also ==
- List of American films of 1963

Preceded by Mother was a Rooster	Foghorn Leghorn cartoons 1963	Succeeded by The Yolk's on You
