= The High and the Flighty =

- Title card
- Directed by: Robert McKimson
- Story by: Tedd Pierce
- Starring: Mel Blanc
- Music by: Carl Stalling
- Animation by: Ted Bonnicksen; Russ Dyson; Keith Darling; George Grandpre (uncredited)
- Layouts by: Robert Gribbroek
- Backgrounds by: Richard H. Thomas
- Color process: Technicolor
- Production company: Warner Bros. Cartoons
- Distributed by: Warner Bros. Pictures
- Release date: February 18, 1956
- Running time: 6:36
- Language: English

The High and the Flighty is a 1956 Warner Bros. Merrie Melodies cartoon directed by Robert McKimson and written by Tedd Pierce. The short was released on February 18, 1956, and stars Daffy Duck, Foghorn Leghorn and the Barnyard Dawg.

The title is a parody of the 1954 Warner Bros. Pictures film The High and the Mighty starring John Wayne.

== Plot ==
Daffy Duck is a traveling salesman for the Ace Novelty Company of Walla Walla, Washington, when he witnesses Foghorn Leghorn and Barnyard Dawg in one of their familiar alternating scraps (Foghorn is seen awakening Dawg by lifting him up by the tail and repeatedly slapping his rear end with a board which causes Dawg to chase him. Dawg goes in pursuit, but reaches a painted white line with a sign that reads "Rope Limit" which causes him to be jerked to a stop by the rope around his neck. Foghorn yells "AHH SHADDUP!!!" then takes a rubber ball and stuffs it in Dawg’s mouth, then punctures the ball with a needle causing Dawg to fly away. As Foghorn leaves he walks past a wooden tower with a sign that reads "Don't Look Up". Foghorn looks up anyway and sees Dawg perched on the tower holding a watermelon which he releases, breaking it over Foghorn's head. Dawg’s prank prompts Foghorn to contemplate "massive retaliation" against him). Daffy enters with his traveling salesman suitcase of novelty joke items and offers to help Foghorn get back at Dawg by selling him a trick bone that is spring-loaded.

As the prank works, Daffy then intervenes to help Dawg retaliate against Foghorn with a gift-wrapped corn-on-the-cob that is connected to an electrical wire. Naturally, as Foghorn wants to get back at Dawg with an even bigger prank, Daffy sells him a product called the Chattanooga Choo Choo where Foghorn plays a gramophone record of steam train sound effects and charges towards the doghouse with a cutout of the front of a steam locomotive, smoking a corn-cob pipe to simulate the train's smoke. This ends up backfiring on Foghorn however, as Dawg sees through the guise. He lifts his doghouse so that Foghorn misses, causing the rooster to leave the yard through an open gate and find himself on a nearby railroad track, getting hit by a real train. To make up for the Chattanooga Choo-Choo, Daffy offers to sell Foghorn an elaborate prank called the Pipe Full Of Fun Kit Number 7, which Foghorn purchases. As Foghorn is setting up the trap, he sees Dawg setting up the same trap to use against him. Both of them realize that Daffy has been playing them against each other (and enriching himself in the process). Daffy overhears Foghorn and Dawg joining forces to pay him back and attempts to flee, but instead falls victim to the Pipe Full O' Fun Kit. Satisfied with their handiwork, Foghorn finally says, "You know, there might, I say, there just might be a market for bottled duck."

== Home media ==
- VHS/DVD - Stars of Space Jam: Daffy Duck
- DVD/Blu-ray - Looney Tunes Platinum Collection: Volume 2

== See also ==
- List of American films of 1956

Preceded by Dime to Retire	Daffy Duck Cartoons; 1956	Succeeded by Rocket Squad

Preceded by Weasel Stop	Foghorn Leghorn cartoons 1956	Succeeded by Raw! Raw! Rooster!
