= Plop Goes the Weasel =

- Directed by: Robert McKimson
- Story by: Tedd Pierce
- Starring: Mel Blanc
- Music by: Carl Stalling
- Animation by: Herman Cohen; Rod Scribner; Phil DeLara; Charles McKimson
- Layouts by: Robert Givens
- Backgrounds by: Richard H. Thomas; Carlos Manriquez
- Color process: Technicolor
- Production company: Warner Bros. Cartoons
- Distributed by: Warner Bros. Pictures; Vitaphone
- Release date: August 22, 1953
- Running time: 7 minutes
- Language: English

Plop Goes the Weasel! is a 1953 Warner Bros. Looney Tunes cartoon directed by Robert McKimson. The cartoon was released on August 22, 1953, and features Foghorn Leghorn and the Barnyard Dawg.

The title is a pun on the song title "Pop Goes the Weasel". The tune is played during the intro and in subsequent cartoons involving the weasel vs Foghorn.

== Plot ==
The story begins with a wanted poster for a weasel with the subtitle "WEASEL (CHICKEN THIEF)." The Dawg is seen guarding the hen house by marching back and forth. Foghorn, who is on the other side of the wire fence, states to the audience that the Dawg is "strictly G.I.", meaning "Gibbering Idiot," not to mention the fact that he's being stubborn as a donkey. Foghorn distracts the Dawg by deliberately letting a young chick escape from the barnyard. As the dog chases the chick around, Foghorn allows a second chick to escape. Then, as the Dawg gives chase, Foghorn props himself on the wire fence and lifts his feet, allowing all of the chicks to run free. As the Dawg realizes he's being tricked, he shouts at Foghorn to "Hey, cut that out!" and collects all of the chicks, even using his tail to scoop up a dropped one when the weasel appears. The Dawg, in order to open the gate to the barnyard, inadvertently asks the weasel to hold on to the chicks. Realizing he just spoke to the weasel, he lifts it up, deposits the chicks back in the yard, and then kicks the weasel away, causing it to yelp repeatedly. Foghorn continues to mock the Dawg by removing a knot and then push a chick through a knothole in the fence.

As the chick escapes, the weasel catches it but then the Dawg catches the weasel and takes back the chick. Foghorn then goes outside of the fence and demands that the Dawg put him back inside. The Dawg obliges by furiously stuffing Foghorn through the knothole, and using a wooden stick to force him through to the inside for tricking him before. Foghorn then conspires to get a large chicken (a "Red Island Rhode") if the weasel will wait. Foghorn then cracks a barrel of syrup over the Dawg and covers him with pillow feathers, then alerts the weasel, who takes the dog back to his den and begins to rip the feathers from the Dawg's ankle. The Dawg snaps that he is not a chicken and offers to team up with the weasel to help him catch Foghorn. The Dawg lures Foghorn over a wooden fence then the weasel hits Foghorn with a mallet. A dazed Foghorn appears intoxicated and is challenged by the Dawg to walk a straight line. Foghorn complies but as he does so one of his legs falls into the weasel's den. The weasel begins to cook Foghorn's foot on a hot skillet and Foghorn begins to shriek. The Dawg appears for a moment to sympathize with Foghorn, but then puts on earmuffs so that he cannot hear Foghorn as the cartoon irises out.

== Voice cast and additional crew ==
- Mel Blanc voices Foghorn Leghorn, Barnyard Dog, Weasel
- Film edited by Treg Brown
- Uncredited animation by Keith Darling

== Home media ==
This short is available on the Looney Tunes Collector's Choice: Volume 1 Blu-ray.
