= Henery Hawk =

Warner Bros. theatrical cartoon character

- Looney Tunes/Merrie Melodies character
- First appearance: The Squawkin' Hawk (August 8, 1942; 84 years ago)
- Created by: Original Incarnation: Chuck Jones; Michael Maltese; Redesign: Robert McKimson; Warren Foster
- Voiced by: Kent Rogers (1942); Mel Blanc (1946–1989); Gilbert Mack (1956); Keith Scott (1993, 1996); Bob Bergen (1998); Joe Alaskey (2000); Jeff Bergman (2003); Damon Jones (2011; singing voice); Ben Falcone (2012); Eric Bauza (2019-2026)

In-universe information
- Species: Chickenhawk
- Gender: Male
- Nationality: American

Henery Hawk is an American cartoon character who appears in twelve comedy film shorts produced in the Looney Tunes and Merrie Melodies series. His first appearance is in the 1942 theatrical release The Squawkin' Hawk, which was directed by Chuck Jones and produced by Leon Schlesinger. Henery's second screen appearance, one directed by Robert McKimson, is in Walky Talky Hawky (1946), which also features the characters Foghorn Leghorn and Barnyard Dawg in their first cartoon roles. The last Warner Brothers theatrical short to showcase the little chickenhawk is the 1961 release Strangled Eggs in which he co-stars again with Foghorn Leghorn as well as with another popular character of that period, Miss Prissy. Following that production, Henery continues to be seen periodically in other animated presentations such as The Looney Tunes Show and Looney Tunes Cartoons.

== Character biography ==
Henery is a small, brown chickenhawk with a forelock of feathers. The young bird lives at home with his parents, speaks with tough-guy bravado, and shows surprising strength to pull or deadlift prey more than three times his size. He was played in the first short by Kent Rogers. After Rogers' death in 1944, the role was then taken over by Mel Blanc; the character was later voiced by Joe Alaskey and then Jeff Bergman. Henery has a high-pitched voice with a New York accent and perpetually angry temperament. (With these characteristics, he became the later inspiration for the Hanna-Barbera character Scrappy-Doo.)

In a typical Foghorn/Henery cartoon, Henery strikes out on his own for the first time, eager to capture (and presumably consume) a chicken. Having led a sheltered life, however, he does not know what a chicken looks like, only that chicken hawks eat them. Foghorn presumes that this diminutive, naïve troublemaker is no real threat; however, seeing the potential for annoyance, he points and manipulates Henery in the direction of Barnyard Dawg. The remainder of the cartoon is usually consumed by Dawg and Leghorn alternately assuring Henery that the other is a chicken and encouraging him to attack the "chicken" mercilessly. In a reversal, the cartoon The Foghorn Leghorn has Foghorn wanting Henery to believe Foghorn is a chicken, where Henery believes Foghorn is merely a "loud-mouthed shnook," supposedly a separate kind of creature. Later, when Barnyard Dawg calls Foghorn a "good-for-nothing chicken", Henery finally wises up.

Many cartoons ended with Henery capturing one (or both) of his tormentors, pragmatically shrugging his shoulders over whether his prey may or may not be an actual fowl. Typically, Henery would decide that one of them must be a real chicken; therefore, he would knock out and capture both, after threatening them with the catch-phrase "Are you comin' quietly, or do I have to muss ya up!?"

Henery Hawk is also a supporting character in the Looney Tunes comic books; in pre-1970s stories, he often starred in features of his own, typically played against Oliver Owl as well as Foghorn.

Henery was going to have a cameo in the 1988 film Who Framed Roger Rabbit, but was later dropped for unknown reasons.

Henery Hawk made a brief cameo appearance in the bleacher scenes of the 1996 film Space Jam, and has a supporting role in the 2000 film Tweety's High-Flying Adventure.

In the 2010s series The Looney Tunes Show, Henery Hawk appeared in the episode "Fish and Visitors", in the Merrie Melodies segment "Chickenhawk" (sung by Barnyard Dawg) where he tries to eat Foghorn Leghorn while Foghorn tries to break him of his craving. In "Father Figures", Porky Pig becomes the father figure of Henery Hawk who wants Porky to get him chicken.

In 2011, Henery Hawk appeared in a commercial for GEICO along with Foghorn Leghorn. In the commercial, Foghorn was serving as a reader for a "book on tape" version of the Charles Dickens novel A Tale of Two Cities when Henery—sick and tired of Foghorn's ad-libbing—takes a club and hits Foghorn with it off-camera.

Henery makes a cameo in a 2024 Ukrainian military recruiting video, in which he is portrayed as a Ukrainian soldier firing an RPK machine gun at a Russian armed forces outpost in southern Donetsk.

Henery makes a cameo in the 2022 film Chip 'n Dale: Rescue Rangers on a box meal.

== Cartoons ==
=== Looney Tunes/Merrie Melodies ===
1. The Squawkin' Hawk (debut) (August 8, 1942) (directed by Chuck Jones)
2. Walky Talky Hawky (August 31, 1946) (directed by Robert McKimson)
3. Crowing Pains (July 12, 1947) (directed by McKimson)
4. You Were Never Duckier (August 7, 1948) (directed by Jones)
5. The Foghorn Leghorn (October 9, 1948) (directed by McKimson)
6. Henhouse Henery (July 2, 1949) (directed by McKimson)
7. The Scarlet Pumpernickel (cameo) (March 4, 1950) (directed by Jones)
8. The Leghorn Blows at Midnight (May 6, 1950) (directed by McKimson)
9. Leghorn Swoggled (July 28, 1951) (directed by McKimson)
10. The EGGcited Rooster (October 4, 1952) (directed by McKimson)
11. All Fowled Up (February 19, 1955) (directed by McKimson)
12. Strangled Eggs (March 18, 1961) (directed by McKimson)

=== Video games ===
- The Bugs Bunny Birthday Blowout (1990)
- Space Jam (1996)
