= The Yolk's on You =

1980 Looney Tunes animated film

Daffy Duck in "The Yolk's on You (1980)

The Yolk's on You is a 1980 non-theatrical Easter special and Looney Tunes animated cartoon short film starring Daffy Duck, Sylvester the Cat, and Foghorn Leghorn. It first aired on April 1, 1980 on NBC as part of the special Daffy Duck's Easter Show (later renamed Daffy Duck's Easter Egg-citement) and is a rare example of Foghorn Leghorn, Sylvester, and Daffy appearing together.

The film was co-directed by Tony Benedict, Gerry Chiniquy, Arthur Davis, and David Detiege. The story was co-written by Tony Benedict, John Dunn, and Friz Freleng. The film was co-produced by David H. DePatie and Friz Freleng.

== Plot ==
Foghorn Leghorn begins the day by crowing to wake up the sun, but his crow doesn’t raise the sun the first time, so he crows again and he finally brings up the sun, and leaves the scene sulking. “Dumb sun ain’t too bright! Don’t know when to come up!”

Miss Prissy is as usual late for Foghorn’s egg expectation. Leghorn is disappointed in Miss Prissy for being late and not laying a normal round white egg. Leghorn warns Prissy only one last chance that if she doesn't lay a normal egg, she will be sent to the old hens farm. Foghorn Leghorn decides that Miss Prissy lays the turquoise Easter eggs. He also tells her to think "egg-shape".

Prissy tries but she lays a golden egg instead. She rolls away the golden egg and soon Sylvester and Daffy find it. The two both try to get it for themselves including the ancient Chinese tickle torture; Daffy whispers to Sylvester to get the egg for one last chance but at the end, they accidentally put the disguised golden egg on the fresh egg farms with Miss Prissy. However, they watch as an egg truck takes away the eggs. In the end, Daffy and Sylvester end up breaking all the eggs over an enormous skillet, with Sylvester warning Daffy if they don't find the egg, Daffy will end up eating the biggest omelette in history.

This episode was Foghorn's Leghorn's first appearance since the Bugs Bunny cartoon False Hare (1964), sixteen years earlier. This cartoon currently airs on the Boomerang channel.

== Voices ==
- Mel Blanc as Daffy Duck, Sylvester the Cat, and Foghorn Leghorn
- Nancy Wible as Miss Prissy
