= Weasel Stop =

- Directed by: Robert McKimson
- Story by: Tedd Pierce
- Starring: Mel Blanc; Lloyd Perryman (uncredited)
- Music by: Milt Franklyn
- Animation by: Keith Darling; Ted Bonnicksen; Russ Dyson
- Layouts by: Richard H. Thomas
- Backgrounds by: Richard H. Thomas
- Color process: Technicolor
- Production company: Warner Bros. Cartoons
- Distributed by: Warner Bros. Pictures; The Vitaphone Corporation
- Release date: February 11, 1956 (US)
- Running time: 6 minutes
- Language: English

Weasel Stop is a 1956 Warner Bros. Looney Tunes animated short film directed by Robert McKimson. The cartoon was released on February 11, 1956, and features Foghorn Leghorn.

The cartoon is unusual in that a different dog (instead of the Barnyard Dawg) is used as Foghorn's nemesis. The title is a pun on the phrase "whistle stop", one of which is seen in the title card.

== Plot ==
A shaggy dog (played by Lloyd Perryman) is the guard at a farm's chicken coop when a lip-smacking weasel comes along, intending to gain access to the chickens. And, never one to side with a canine, Foghorn Leghorn opts to help the weasel by trying to violently remove the guard dog. The rooster and weasel try various methods of getting rid of the dog, but wind up losing all their feathers and fur in a hay baling machine. The cartoon ends with Foghorn saying "Fortunately, I always keep my feathers numbered for just such an emergency," a line used in several Warner Bros. Cartoons; after the iris out, the weasel reappears wearing its hay bale of fur and runs off in search of another meal.

== Voice cast ==
- Mel Blanc as Foghorn Leghorn, Willy the Weasel, Hen, Dog Barks
- Lloyd Perryman as Shaggy Dog (uncredited)
