= Barnyard Dawg =

Warner Bros. theatrical cartoon character

- Looney Tunes/Merrie Melodies character
- A still of scene of Barnyard Dawg as seen in Walky Talky Hawky (animated by Richard Bickenbach)
- First appearance: Walky Talky Hawky (August 31, 1946; 80 years ago)
- Created by: Robert McKimson
- Voiced by: Mel Blanc (1946–1989); Robert C. Bruce (1947); Noel Blanc (1991); Bob Bergen (1996); Greg Burson (1998, 2003); Jeff Bergman (2003, 2018); Billy West (2003); Joe Alaskey (2008); Ben Falcone (2011; singing voice); Eric Bauza (2018–2026); Andrew Morgado (2022–present)

In-universe information
- Aliases: Mandrake; Fido; Wover; George P. Mandrake
- Species: Dog (Basset Hound)
- Gender: Male
- Nationality: American

Barnyard Dawg is a Looney Tunes character. A feisty anthropomorphic basset hound, he is the archenemy of Foghorn Leghorn. He was created by Robert McKimson, who also created Foghorn, and was voiced by Mel Blanc. Dawg feuds with other notable Looney Tunes characters as well, such as Henery Hawk, Daffy Duck and Sylvester. He appeared in 23 Golden Age–era Warner Bros. shorts.

== Biography ==
Dawg's first appearance was in Walky Talky Hawky (1946), the same Henery Hawk cartoon in which Foghorn himself debuted. Although, in that cartoon, Dawg initiates hostilities with Foghorn by dropping a watermelon on his head (prompting Foghorn to grumble "Every day, it's the same thing!"), Dawg is usually seen sleeping in his doghouse at a cartoon's beginning, with Foghorn provoking him by slapping his hindquarters with a wooden fencepost, setting the stage for Dawg to seek vengeance, often by manipulating Henery Hawk.

Dawg, called "Mandrake", was cast as a pet of Porky Pig in 1947's One Meat Brawl, where the pair pursue one-shot star Grover Groundhog, who gives the hunting dog a sob story ("Wife and 72 children!...No coal in the cellar...!") that has him weeping sympathetic tears, much to Porky's disgust. Dawg/Mandrake uses this ploy himself in 1949's Daffy Duck Hunt, where, still Porky's pet and hunting companion, he persuades Daffy Duck to play along at being captured so he can avoid punishment from Porky, promising to free the duck later. However, once Daffy is tucked into Porky's freezer, Mandrake goes back on the bargain, although Daffy has little trouble outwitting both him and Porky. Although Dawg usually sports a gruff New York City accent in the Foghorn Leghorn shorts, in Daffy Duck Hunt he speaks mostly with a Southern accent (only one line, "I'll fix that dirty duck!", is rendered in his usual voice). Another character who resembles Dawg (known as Geo R. Dog) would also appear in the 1951 Goofy Gophers cartoon A Bone for a Bone.

In 1958's Don't Axe Me, Dawg, now the pet of Mr. and Mrs. Elmer Fudd and renamed Rover (pronounced "Wover" by Fudd), again matches wits with Daffy after convincing Mrs. Fudd to designate the duck as Sunday dinner; surprisingly, Daffy is the loser in this cartoon, although he escapes doom when a guest requests a vegetarian meal instead. In 1958's Gopher Broke, Dawg is the subject of "psychological wearing down" by the Goofy Gophers, Mac and Tosh, who are trying to get their vegetables back. After the gophers initiate phase no. 4 of their plan, which leaves Dawg on top of a telephone pole, he flips out and flies off (literally) after a crow, causing a deadpan pig, who's been witnessing the aftermath of the gophers' abuse against Dawg, to also flip out. While the pig has gone to see an animal psychiatrist, the doctor sees Dawg fly by his window and also flips out enough to join the pig on the couch.

Henery mistakes Dawg for a chicken in 1948's The Foghorn Leghorn, because his father told him that chickens are great big monsters with real huge teeth who live in caves; he ignores Foghorn after confusing an insult toward the rooster of being "a loud-mouthed schnook" as some kind of literal species. Henery notices Dawg's mouth and presumes Dawg's doghouse is a kind of cave. Henery repeats the mistake in The Leghorn Blows at Midnight.

Although Dawg is normally portrayed as the straight man for Foghorn's pranks, in 1962's Mother Was a Rooster, he is portrayed in a very negative light, as he not only steals an ostrich egg (he justifies this by explaining that it's been kind of dull round the farm lately, giving reference to his four-year peace between him and Foghorn between Weasel While You Work and Mother Was a Rooster), he mocks the hatched ostrich, which Foghorn has adopted, and cheats in a boxing match with the rooster.

Dawg also appeared in 1996's Space Jam as a member of the Tune Squad, and in 2003's Looney Tunes: Back in Action playing cards with other dogs including Ham and Ex, Spike and Chester, the Russian Dog from 1944's Hare Ribbin' and Charlie Dog in Yosemite Sam's casino. In Baby Looney Tunes, Dawg appears as a puppy who chases the cool roosters, until Foghorn Leghorn shows the cool roosters how to deal with dogs (through a game of fetch), and instead of joining them, just befriends Dawg.

Barnyard Dawg appeared in The Looney Tunes Show episode "Fish and Visitor's" Merrie Melodie's segment, "Chickenhawk", with his singing voice provided by Ben Falcone. He had a brief cameo at the end of the segment where it was shown that he sang the song the whole time. He later appeared in "Reunion's" Merrie Melodie's segment, "Cock of the Walk". In "Father Figures", Barnyard Dawg made a cameo as the umpire in the Father/Son Tennis Tournament final between Bugs and Walter Bunny against Daffy Duck and Foghorn Leghorn.

Barnyard Dawg also appeared in Looney Tunes Cartoons in various Foghorn Leghorn segments. He also appears in the pre-school series Bugs Bunny Builders. In that show, his full name is officially mentioned: George P. Mandrake.

Barnyard Dawg appears in Coyote vs. Acme.

== Cartoons ==
All cartoons are directed by Robert McKimson unless noted. MM = Merrie Melodies, LT = Looney Tunes

- Walky Talky Hawky (1946) – MM
- One Meat Brawl (1947) – MM
- Crowing Pains (1947) – LT
- The Foghorn Leghorn (1948) – MM
- Daffy Duck Hunt (1949) – LT
- Henhouse Henery (1949) – LT
- The Leghorn Blows at Midnight (1950) – LT
- A Bone for a Bone (1951) - LT (Directed by Friz Freleng, via loose resemblance)
- Leghorn Swoggled (1951) – MM
- Lovelorn Leghorn (1951) – LT
- Sock-a-Doodle-Do (1952) – LT
- The EGGcited Rooster (1952) – MM
- Plop Goes the Weasel (1953) – LT
- Of Rice and Hen (1953) – LT
- All Fowled Up (1955) – LT
- The High and the Flighty (1956) – MM
- Fox-Terror (1957) – MM
- Don't Axe Me (1958) – MM
- Feather Bluster (1958) – MM
- Weasel While You Work (1958) – MM
- Gopher Broke (1958) – LT
- Mother Was a Rooster (1962) – MM
- Banty Raids (1963) – MM
- Cock-A-Doodle-Duel (2002) - LT

== Voice ==
Barnyard Dawg was originally voiced by Mel Blanc from the character's debut until the final cartoon Foghorn Leghorn starred into the Golden Age. After Blanc's death in 1989, the character has been voiced by 9 other actors: Noel Blanc, Bob Bergen, Greg Burson, Jeff Bergman, Billy West, Joe Alaskey, Ben Falcone, Eric Bauza and Andrew Morgado.
