= Miss Prissy =

Warner Bros. theatrical cartoon character

- Looney Tunes/Merrie Melodies character
- First appearance: An Egg Scramble (1950)
- Created by: Robert McKimson
- Voiced by: Mel Blanc (1950); Bea Benaderet (1950–1955); Marian Richman (1954); June Foray (1959–1987); Julie Bennett (1961); Nancy Wible (1980); Tress MacNeille (2000); Grey DeLisle (2011); Laurie Fraser (2014); Eric Bauza (2018); Candi Milo (2023–present)

In-universe information
- Species: Hen
- Gender: Female
- Significant other: Foghorn Leghorn
- Children: Egghead Jr. (son)
- Nationality: American

Miss Prissy is a fictional character in the Looney Tunes and Merrie Melodies series. She is typically described as an old spinster hen, thinner than the other hens in the chicken coop, wearing a blue bonnet and wire-rimmed glasses. Though sometimes quite loquacious, she is known for getting through whole cartoons uttering no more words than, "Yeees!" This affectation is based on Martha Harrison, a monosyllabic character portrayed by actress Pert Kelton on Milton Berle's radio show. Prissy is often mocked by the other hens, who describe her as "old square britches".

== History ==
Miss Prissy's official first appearance was in the short An Egg Scramble (1950), the only cartoon featuring her and Porky Pig together, in which the other hens are mocking her for being unable to lay an egg, causing her great embarrassment.

Her next appearances are centered on Foghorn Leghorn. In Lovelorn Leghorn (1951), she is set on finding a husband, and in Of Rice and Hen (1953), she is looking to have children. However in Little Boy Boo (1954), she is depicted as a widow with a child, Egghead Jr., and with a much more extensive vocabulary in long sounding words other than her trademark "yeeesss." Foghorn is typically portrayed as resisting her romantic overtures, although both Little Boy Boo and Strangled Eggs (1961) depict him as the one pursuing Prissy for his own selfish needs. However, he does show an unusual sympathy for her emotional vulnerability.

Miss Prissy also appeared in the cartoon The Yolk's on You (1980).

== Later appearances ==
Miss Prissy made a cameo in the 1996 film Space Jam, as part of the during the basketball game. Miss Prissy (voiced by Tress MacNeille) appears in the film Tweety's High-Flying Adventure (2000) as part of the team of birds following Tweety's journey around the world. Miss Prissy (voiced by Grey DeLisle) appears in The Looney Tunes Show episode "The Foghorn Leghorn Story", where she played Mama Leghorn in Foghorn Leghorn's movie about him. She returned in the Looney Tunes Cartoons episode "Feather of the Bride" voiced by Candi Milo.

Miss Prissy appears in the Bugs Bunny Builders, voiced by Milo. episode in "Miss Prissy's Market".

Miss Prissy made a cameo in the 2026 film Coyote vs. Acme, voiced by Milo.
