= Foghorn Leghorn =

Warner Bros. theatrical cartoon character

- Looney Tunes/Merrie Melodies character
- First appearance: Walky Talky Hawky (August 31, 1946; 80 years ago)
- Created by: Robert McKimson
- Voiced by: Mel Blanc † (1946–1989); Jeff Bergman (1990–1993, 2002–2004, 2011–present); Greg Burson † (1990–2003); Joe Alaskey † (1991–1993, 2000, 2006); Frank Gorshin † (1996–1997); Bill Farmer (1996, 2000, 2008); Billy West (1998–1999); Jeff Bennett (2000–2011, 2018); Scott McNeil (Baby Looney Tunes; 2005); Maurice LaMarche (2007); Eric Bauza † (2018, 2021–2026); (see below)

In-universe information
- Species: Leghorn Rooster
- Gender: Male
- Family: Harold Leghorn (father; deceased); Unnamed grandson
- Significant other: Miss Prissy
- Relatives: Mr. Loghorn
- Nationality: American

Foghorn Leghorn is a cartoon character, an anthropomorphic rooster who appears in Looney Tunes and Merrie Melodies cartoons and films from Warner Bros. Animation. He was created by Robert McKimson and starred in 29 cartoons from 1946 to 1964 in the golden age of American animation. All 29 of these cartoons were directed by McKimson.

Foghorn Leghorn's first appearance was in the 1946 Henery Hawk short Walky Talky Hawky. Foghorn's voice was created and originally performed by Mel Blanc and was later voiced by Jeff Bergman, Joe Alaskey, Greg Burson, Frank Gorshin, Jeff Bennett, Bill Farmer, and Eric Bauza.

== Inspiration ==
Foghorn Leghorn was directly inspired by the character of Senator Claghorn, a blustery Southern politician played by Kenny Delmar on Fred Allen's popular 1940s radio show. Foghorn adopted many of Claghorn's catchphrases, such as "I say..." and "That's a joke, son!" Delmar's inspiration for Claghorn was a Texas rancher who was fond of saying this.

According to Keith Scott, the character's voice from his initial appearance was also patterned after actor Jack Clifford, who played a hard-of-hearing West Coast-only radio character from the 1930s, known simply as The Sheriff, on a radio program called Blue Monday Jamboree. The accent has similarities to that of another Mel Blanc voice: Yosemite Sam (a near-strictly Friz Freleng character); and even more similar to the sheriff character (also considered a precursor to Sam) in Stage Door Cartoon.

== Biography, characteristics and personality ==
Physically, Foghorn Leghorn is depicted as a very large rooster with a Southern accent; he is easily the tallest of all the regular Looney Tunes characters. He has a bombastic and somewhat unrefined personality, and shows a penchant for mischief. Aside from the Senator Claghorn reference, "Foghorn" is indicative of his loudmouthed personality, while "Leghorn" refers to a particular Italian breed of chicken. According to A Broken Leghorn and Raw! Raw! Rooster! Foghorn lives on "Old MacDonald's Farm" in Cucamonga, California, and had attended Chicken Tech University; his college roommate and rival Rhode Island Red is a practical joker and even more obnoxious than Foghorn himself.

Foghorn often fancies himself a mentor figure to the smaller and younger characters he encounters, particularly Henery Hawk, tossing off bits of self-styled sagacity interjected with phrases like "Pay attention, son", or "Look at me when I'm talkin' to ya, boy", both of which are borrowed heavily from Senator Claghorn's vernacular. But this proves to be Foghorn's worst trait, as his loud and fast mouth and propensity for over-explanation eventually annoys his intended subjects so much that, completely fed up with him, they end up hitting him over the head with a blunt object, yelling "Ahhhhh, shaddap!" and leaving in a huff.

Foghorn Leghorn was shown to have a more villainous side in the film Coyote vs. Acme as the ACME Corporation's corrupt CEO that allows malfunctioning products to be sold to toons as a means to test and improve products meant for humans.

=== "Camptown Races" ===
Beginning with the 1949 cartoon Henhouse Henery, Foghorn frequently performs a verse from the Stephen Foster song "Camptown Races", softly humming the lyrics while loudly singing the refrain "Doo-Dahh! Doo-Dahh!", and ending the verse, again loudly, with "Ohh, Doo-Dahh Day!" He often hums the song more than once in a given short, though in the 1950 cartoon The Leghorn Blows at Midnight, he hums "Camptown" only at the beginning, but then hums "Old MacDonald" in two later scenes. On occasion, he also sings his own lyrics if they are related to what he's doing at the time. "Camptown Races" essentially became Foghorn's signature tune and one of the most widely familiar uses of the song in popular culture. The final theatrical film in which Foghorn sings "Camptown" is Mother Was a Rooster (1962).

=== Rivalry with Barnyard Dawg ===
Foghorn Leghorn and Barnyard Dawg in The EGGcited Rooster (1952).

Many of Foghorn's cartoons involve his perennial prank war with Barnyard Dawg, though it is never revealed how or why their feud started in the first place. Foghorn is often the initial aggressor, but unlike most of the other Looney Tunes rivalries, Foghorn pranks Dawg out of sheer self-amusement and Dawg is usually the one with the winning hand in nearly every short they appear together, although both lost in Walky Talky Hawky, Of Rice and Hen, and Mother Was a Rooster, and Foghorn managed to have some victories over Dawg in the Looney Tunes comic books. But for all of Foghorn's pranks, Dawg is just as adept at retaliation.

Most of the Leghorn cartoons begin the same: Foghorn, humming "Camptown Races" to himself and carrying a wooden plank, sneaks up on Dawg while he is sleeping, often facing into his doghouse with his back protruding out the entry hole. Foghorn then pulls Dawg up by his tail and uses the plank to give him a whacking on his rear (in nearly every cartoon, Foghorn gives Dawg eight whacks), at which point the angered Dawg chases after Foghorn barking, but can only go as far as the rope to which he is tied, which either yanks him back or stops him. In the latter case, he keeps barking at Foghorn, who tells him, "Aah-h, sha-daahhp!" or does something to Dawg to force him to stop.

Despite their feud, Foghorn and Dawg manage to get along in a few instances, usually joining forces to defeat somebody who has caused problems for both of them (e.g. Daffy Duck in The High and the Flighty or a fox in Fox-Terror).

In the 1958 short Feather Bluster, the prank feud has been passed down to Dawg's and Foghorn's respective grandsons, and the now-elderly Foghorn is puzzled as to why the little leghorn is behaving the way he is, but the elderly Dawg is only too happy to point out there's nothing wrong with him, except that "he takes after you."

Foghorn is joined in a few episodes by a weasel called "Bill", who initially attempts to eat him but ends up joining forces to outwit Dawg.

=== "Foggy" and others ===
Another recurring theme throughout the cartoons includes the attempts of the naive and diminutive Henery Hawk to catch and eat a chicken, with Foghorn usually tricking him into believing that he is another animal and that Dawg is a chicken. Another frequently used storyline concerns Foghorn's efforts to woo the widowed hen Miss Prissy, usually by babysitting her son the studious Egghead Jr., or on one occasion in Strangled Eggs, an adopted Henery Hawk.

== Filmography ==
=== Golden Age appearances (1946–1964) ===
All of these 29 shorts from 1946 to 1964 were directed by Robert McKimson.

#	Title	Year	DVD & Blu-Ray Availability	Notes
1	Walky Talky Hawky	1946	DVD: Looney Tunes Golden Collection: Volume 3; DVD: Warner Bros. Home Entertainment Academy Awards Animation Collection; Blu-Ray & DVD: Looney Tunes Platinum Collection: Volume 3	
2	Crowing Pains	1947	DVD: Looney Tunes Golden Collection: Volume 6; Blu-Ray: Looney Tunes Collector's Vault: Volume 2	with Sylvester
3	The Foghorn Leghorn	1948	DVD: Looney Tunes Golden Collection: Volume 1; Blu-Ray & DVD: Looney Tunes Platinum Collection: Volume 2	
4	Henhouse Henery	1949	Blu-Ray: Looney Tunes Collector's Choice: Volume 4	
5	The Leghorn Blows at Midnight	1950	Blu-Ray: Looney Tunes Collector's Choice: Volume 2	
6	A Fractured Leghorn	1950	Blu-Ray: Looney Tunes Collector's Choice: Volume 1	
7	Leghorn Swoggled	1951	Blu-Ray: Looney Tunes Collector's Choice: Volume 4	
8	Lovelorn Leghorn	1951	Blu-Ray & DVD: Looney Tunes Platinum Collection: Volume 1	
9	Sock-a-Doodle-Do	1952	Blu-Ray: Looney Tunes Collector's Vault: Volume 2	
10	The EGGcited Rooster	1952	Blu-Ray: Looney Tunes Collector's Vault: Volume 2	
11	Plop Goes the Weasel	1953	Blu-Ray: Looney Tunes Collector's Choice: Volume 1	
12	Of Rice and Hen	1953	Blu-Ray: Looney Tunes Collector's Choice: Volume 3	
13	Little Boy Boo	1954	DVD: Looney Tunes Super Stars' Foghorn Leghorn & Friends: Barnyard Bigmouth; Blu-Ray: Looney Tunes Collector's Vault: Volume 1	
14	Feather Dusted	1955	Blu-Ray: Looney Tunes Collector's Vault: Volume 1	
15	All Fowled Up	1955	DVD: Looney Tunes Super Stars' Foghorn Leghorn & Friends: Barnyard Bigmouth	
16	Weasel Stop	1956	DVD: Looney Tunes Super Stars' Foghorn Leghorn & Friends: Barnyard Bigmouth	
17	The High and the Flighty	1956	Blu-Ray & DVD: Looney Tunes Platinum Collection: Volume 2	with Daffy Duck
18	Raw! Raw! Rooster!	1956	DVD: Looney Tunes Golden Collection: Volume 6	
19	Fox-Terror	1957	DVD: Looney Tunes Super Stars' Foghorn Leghorn & Friends: Barnyard Bigmouth; Blu-Ray: Looney Tunes Collector's Vault: Volume 3	
20	Feather Bluster	1958	Blu-Ray: Looney Tunes Collector's Vault: Volume 3	
21	Weasel While You Work	1958	DVD: Looney Tunes Super Stars' Foghorn Leghorn & Friends: Barnyard Bigmouth	
22	A Broken Leghorn	1959	DVD: Looney Tunes Golden Collection: Volume 1; DVD: Looney Tunes Super Stars' Foghorn Leghorn & Friends: Barnyard Bigmouth	
23	Crockett-Doodle-Do	1960	DVD: Looney Tunes Super Stars' Foghorn Leghorn & Friends: Barnyard Bigmouth	
24	The Dixie Fryer	1960	Blu-Ray: Looney Tunes Collector's Vault: Volume 1	
25	Strangled Eggs	1961	DVD: Looney Tunes Super Stars' Foghorn Leghorn & Friends: Barnyard Bigmouth	
26	The Slick Chick	1962		
27	Mother Was a Rooster	1962	Blu-Ray: Looney Tunes Collector's Vault: Volume 2	
28	Banty Raids	1963	DVD: Looney Tunes Super Stars' Foghorn Leghorn & Friends: Barnyard Bigmouth; Blu-Ray: Looney Tunes Collector's Vault: Volume 1	
29	False Hare	1964	DVD: Looney Tunes Super Stars' Bugs Bunny: Hare Extraordinaire (cropped to widescreen); Blu-Ray: Bugs Bunny 80th Anniversary Collection (original 4:3 aspect ratio)	Cameo apperence in a Bugs Bunny cartoon.

=== Post-Golden Age appearances ===
1. Daffy Duck and Porky Pig Meet the Groovie Goolies (1972) – voiced by Mel Blanc
2. Bugs Bunny's Christmas Carol (1979) – voiced by Mel Blanc
3. The Yolk's on You (1980) – voiced by Mel Blanc
4. Who Framed Roger Rabbit (1988) – voiced by Joe Alaskey, (silent cameo appearance; voiced in a deleted scene)
5. Superior Duck (cameo appearance) (1996) – voiced by Frank Gorshin
6. Space Jam (1996) – voiced by Bill Farmer and Greg Burson
7. Pullet Surprise (1997) – voiced by Frank Gorshin
8. Tweety's High-Flying Adventure (2000) – voiced by Jeff Bennett
9. Looney Tunes: Back in Action (2003) – voiced by Jeff Bennett
10. Cock-A-Doodle Duel (2004) – voiced by Jeff Bennett
11. GEICO commercial (2011) – voiced by Jeff Bennett
12. Space Jam: A New Legacy (2021) – voiced by Eric Bauza
13. Chip 'n Dale: Rescue Rangers (2022) – (non-physical cameo appearance)
14. Coyote vs. Acme (2026) – voiced by Eric Bauza

== Voice actors ==
- Mel Blanc (1946–1989)
- Gilbert Mack (Golden Records records, Bugs Bunny Songfest)
- Jeff Bergman (Bugs Bunny's 50th Birthday Spectacular, Tiny Toon Adventures, Tyson Foods commercial, The Plucky Duck Show, The 1st 13th Annual Fancy Anvil Awards Program Special...Live!...In Stereo!, Cartoon Network's Funniest Bloopers and Other Embarrassing Moments, Boomerang bumpers, The Looney Tunes Show, Looney Tunes Dash, Scooby Doo and Looney Tunes: Cartoon Universe, Looney Tunes: Rabbits Run, New Looney Tunes, Converse commercials, Looney Tunes Cartoons, Bugs Bunny Builders, Tiny Toons Looniversity, Teen Titans Go!, Looney Tunes: Wacky World of Sports)
- Noel Blanc (You Rang? answering machine messages)
- Greg Burson (Bugs Bunny's Birthday Ball, Looney Tunes River Ride, Tiny Toon Adventures, Bugs Bunny Goin' Hollywood, Taz-Mania, Animaniacs, Have Yourself a Looney Tunes Christmas, Hip-Hop Hare, Carrotblanca read-along, Carrotblanca short, Space Jam (most lines), The Looney West, Bugs & Friends Sing Elvis, Bugs Bunny's Learning Adventures, Looney Tunes: What's Up Rock?!, various commercials and webtoons)
- Keith Scott (Looney Tunes Musical Revue, The Christmas Looney Tunes Classic Collection, Spectacular Light and Sound Show Illuminanza, Toyota commercial, Golden Eggs commercial, KFC commercial, Kraft Foods commercial, Looney Tunes: We Got the Beat!, The Looney Tunes Radio Show, Looney Rock)
- Joe Alaskey (Madcap Mardi Gras, The Toonite Show Starring Bugs Bunny, Bah, Humduck! A Looney Tunes Christmas)
- Frank Gorshin (Superior Duck, Pullet Surprise)
- Bill Farmer (Space Jam (some lines), The Looney Tunes Rockin' Road Show, Looney Tunes Racing, Looney Tunes: Space Race, Looney Tunes: Cartoon Conductor)
- Billy West (The Sylvester & Tweety Mysteries, Histeria!)
- Loy Edge (You Don't Know Doc! ACME Wise-Guy Edition)
- Jeff Bennett (Tweety's High-Flying Adventure, Sprint commercial, Looney Tunes: Back in Action, Looney Tunes: Back in Action (video game), Cock-A-Doodle-Duel, A Looney Tunes Sing-A-Long Christmas, GEICO commercial, Ani-Mayhem)
- Scott McNeil (Baby Looney Tunes)
- Maurice LaMarche (Looney Tunes: Acme Arsenal)
- Scott Innes (AT&T commercial)
- Damon Jones (singing voice in The Looney Tunes Show)
- Eric Bauza (Looney Tunes: World of Mayhem, Space Jam: A New Legacy, Acme Fools, MultiVersus, Coyote vs. Acme)
