= Warren Batchelder =

American animator (1917–2007)

- Born: April 18, 1917; Los Angeles, California, U.S.
- Died: February 12, 2007 (aged 89); Malibu, California, U.S.
- Employers: Warner Bros Cartoons (1945–1963); DePatie-Freleng Enterprises (1963–1980)

Warren Batchelder (April 18, 1917 – February 12, 2007) was an animator on many Warner Bros. and DePatie–Freleng cartoons. He worked as animation director on the Dungeons and Dragons cartoon show, and he did the animation for the Peanuts TV Special in 1976 It's Arbor Day, Charlie Brown. He also did the animation for the Peanuts Movie in 1977 Race for Your Life, Charlie Brown, although he was uncredited.

== Career ==
Batchelder began his animation career in 1936. At Warner Bros. Cartoons, his first known role was working as an assistant animator to Virgil Ross in 1945, before being promoted to a full-fledge animator for Robert McKimson's unit in 1956, his first credit being the 1958-released Foghorn Leghorn short Feather Bluster. After Warner Bros. Cartoons closed in 1963, Batchelder along with other ex-Warner staff worked for the newly formed DePatie–Freleng Enterprises. He additionally worked for Bill Melendez Productions and Richard Williams' Studio around this time.

Batchelder would continue to work with Friz Freleng and David H. DePatie when their studio was acquired by Marvel in 1980, as well as the newly opened Warner Bros. Animation studio that same year. In 1987, he received the Animation Guild Golden Award, and retired in 2002.
