= Cornett Wood =

American animator (1905–1980)

Cornett Wood (September 12, 1905 – May 16, 1980) was an American animator and layout artist.

Along with other Disney animators Harry Reed and John A. Waltz, Wood was a graduate of the Herron School of Art in Indianapolis.

He served as an animator on Snow White and the Seven Dwarfs and Fantasia for Walt Disney, and eventually went on to work on layouts for Robert McKimson at Warner Bros. Cartoons, wherein he worked on numerous Looney Tunes cartoons released from 1946 to 1951.

He died in 1980.
