= Charles McKimson =

American animator

- Born: Charles Edson McKimson Jr. December 20, 1914; Denver, Colorado, U.S.
- Died: April 16, 1999 (aged 84); Los Angeles, California, U.S.
- Other name: Chuck McKimson
- Occupations: Animator; Comic book artist
- Spouse: Ruth McKimson
- Children: Holly McKimson
- Parent(s): Charles Edson McKimson Sr. Mildred Porter

Charles Edson McKimson Jr. (December 20, 1914 – April 16, 1999) was an American animator, best known for his work at Warner Bros. Cartoons. He was the younger brother of animators Robert and Thomas McKimson. His father was a newspaperman who later become the editor of the Scandia Journal in Scandia, Kansas.

McKimson was born in Denver, Colorado, to Mildred (Porter) and Charles Edson McKimson Sr. The family located to Los Angeles with his family in the 1920s. He began his career in animation in 1937, when he joined Leon Schlesinger Productions as a member of Tex Avery's unit. McKimson left the studio during World War II to serve in the US Army Signal Corps, returning in 1946. Upon his return he was assigned to his brother Robert's unit, where he worked as a lead animator. Charles received co-story credit on one short, 1955's All Fowled Up (the other writer being Sid Marcus), starring Foghorn Leghorn — a character utilized exclusively by Robert. While at Warner Bros. McKimson drew the syndicated Roy Rogers comic strip from 1949 to 1953, in collaboration with his other brother Thomas and artist Pete Alvarado. The strip was published under the pseudonym "Al McKimson".

McKimson left Warner Bros. Cartoons in 1954, after Jack L. Warner briefly shut down the animation division. He subsequently joined Dell Publishing, where he served as Art Director for their comic and coloring books division. In 1961, McKimson worked as animation director on the short-lived animated television series Calvin and the Colonel.

McKimson died in 1999 at the age of 84.
