= Phil DeLara =

American animator (1914–1973)

- Born: Philip Bruce DeLara; September 1, 1911 Los Angeles, California, US
- Died: July 5, 1973 (aged 61)
- Areas: Animator; Artist

Philip DeLara (September 1, 1911 – July 5, 1973) was a Warner Bros. Cartoons animator and Disney comics, MGM and Hanna-Barbera artist.

As an animator, he worked on Bugs Bunny, Porky Pig and Daffy Duck and later on Speedy Gonzales, and the Tasmanian Devil, among others. At Western Publishing, he was the main artist of Walt Disney Animation Studios's Chip 'n' Dale comics, but also drew Donald Duck, Gyro Gearloose and Uncle Scrooge as well as Mickey Mouse comics for the foreign-market Disney Studio stories.

Born in Los Angeles, California, Philip cartooned and graduated from Franklin High School and studied at the Otis Art Institute. After he studied, he drew for the Junior Times for eleven years with Cal Howard and Irv Spector. Warner Bros. Cartoons was the first animation studio he worked for.
