= Robert McKimson =

American animator (1910–1977)

- Robert McKimson, early 1930s
- Born: Robert Porter McKimson; October 13, 1910; Denver, Colorado, U.S.
- Died: September 29, 1977 (aged 66); Burbank, California, U.S.
- Occupations: Animator; illustrator
- Years active: 1929–1977
- Employer(s): Walt Disney Productions (1929–1930); Romer Grey Studio (1930); Harman and Ising (1930–1933); Leon Schlesinger Productions/Warner Bros. Cartoons (1933–1963); Cascade Studios (1953); DePatie–Freleng Enterprises (1963–1968; 1969–1977); Warner Bros.-Seven Arts (1968–1969)
- Spouse: Viola McKimson (d. 1963)
- Children: 2

Robert Porter McKimson Sr. (October 13, 1910 – September 29, 1977) was an American animator and illustrator, best known for his work on the Looney Tunes and Merrie Melodies series of cartoons from Warner Bros. Cartoons and later DePatie–Freleng Enterprises. He wrote and directed many animated cartoon shorts starring Bugs Bunny, Daffy Duck, Porky Pig, Foghorn Leghorn, Hippety Hopper, Speedy Gonzales, and the Tasmanian Devil, among other characters. He also developed Bugs Bunny's design in the 1943 short Tortoise Wins by a Hare.

== Early life ==
After he was born in Denver, Colorado, on October 13, 1910, McKimson's family variously lived in Wray, Colorado, Los Angeles, and Canadian, Texas, before settling in Los Angeles in 1926. From 1927 to 1928, McKimson and his brother Tom illustrated a prospective children's book written by their mother titled Mouse Tales, the characters of which were notably similar to those of Walt Disney cartoons (e.g. Mickey Mouse). These drawings entered storage in the 1930s, resurfacing six decades later.

== Career ==
In mid-1929, Robert was offered a job at Walt Disney Productions as an assistant animator to Dick Lundy, while Tom apprenticed under Norm Ferguson. According to Tom, Disney animators attending Otis Art Institute with him recommended him, while Robert said they were hired after an aunt from Denver met Disney at a party. According to Robert, the studio included less than 30 people, comprising nine animators, each with one assistant. After three months, the brothers received a raise from $18 to $25. Despite little extant evidence, Lundy corroborated that the McKimsons worked for Disney.

In 1930, the brothers were offered a higher salary at an Altadena studio planned by Romer Grey, the oldest son of Western author Zane Grey. The Romer Grey Studio produced several cartoons, four featuring Binko the Bear Cub, developed by the McKimsons and bearing strong similarities to Mickey Mouse. Due to the Great Depression, Grey's studio was unable to close a distribution deal. No shorts were released, with only a handful completed (and only one known to survive).

At the same time he began working for Grey, McKimson was hired by Hugh Harman and Rudolf Ising, first doing ink-and-paint duties for the first Looney Tunes, then becoming an in-betweener before becoming an animator by 1931, when the Romer Grey Studio shut down. At that time he had an accident that gave him a concussion. As a result, he was able to visualize better, thus increasing his production and animation. Alongside Friz Freleng and Rollin Hamilton, McKimson returned to Leon Schlesinger Productions after Harman and Ising cut ties with Leon Schlesinger over budget disputes. He was the head animator and go-to guy in the late 1930s at the studio, being one of the most important figures in defining the animation of characters such as Bugs Bunny. Eventually he worked exclusively with Bob Clampett. He was offered a directorial position by Schlesinger in 1938, but declined, allowing the position to go to animator Chuck Jones. He eventually accepted his own directorial position in late 1944, when Frank Tashlin left Warner Bros. to direct live-action films. McKimson animated a cameo appearance by Bugs Bunny in Jasper Goes Hunting, a 1943 Puppetoon film produced by George Pal and released by rival studio Paramount Pictures, an unprecedented collaboration at the time given their distributors' rivalry.

A still of a scene taken from the 1950 Hippety Hopper/Sylvester short Pop 'im Pop! animated by Bill Melendez. This cartoon also introduced Sylvester's son, Sylvester Junior.

McKimson's first Warner Bros. cartoon that he finished, The Return of Mr. Hook, was released in 1945 exclusively for the U.S. Navy. His first theatrical short, Daffy Doodles, was released in early April 1946. His third theatrical short entitled Acrobatty Bunny would be the first Bugs Bunny short McKimson directed. It was released in June 1946. His better-known efforts include Hillbilly Hare, A-Lad-In His Lamp, Stupor Duck, The Windblown Hare, Walky Talky Hawky, and Big Top Bunny.

McKimson created characters like Foghorn Leghorn and the Tasmanian Devil, as well as directing every Hippety Hopper/Sylvester pairing. He also created Speedy Gonzales for the 1953 short Cat-Tails for Two and directed many others periodically (along with Friz Freleng and other directors) for the remainder of his theatrical career.

In June 1953, the Warner Bros. cartoon studio was shut down for a period of six months due to the 3-D fad at the time, which Jack L. Warner found too costly a process to use for animated cartoons. McKimson's unit, however, was disbanded entirely two months before the shutdown. He would make an Oldsmobile commercial at Cascade Studios around this time.

After the studio re-opened, Freleng and Jones quickly re-assembled their respective units, but there was no indication that McKimson and his unit would be brought back. McKimson was able to persuade Warner Bros. to reopen his unit at the cost of working with fewer resources and less money. Apart from writer Tedd Pierce, background painter Richard H. Thomas and animator Keith Darling (who worked uncredited for McKimson prior to the 1953 closure), he was unable to hire back most of his animators, including Rod Scribner and his own brother Charles. At the start of this period, McKimson animated on four of his own shorts, The Hole Idea (in fact, he was the sole animator credited on that film), Dime to Retire, Too Hop to Handle (along with uncredited work from Jones' animator Ben Washam), and Weasel Stop (where McKimson had no animation credit). Soon, McKimson assembled a new team of artists, including layout man/background painter Robert Gribbroek (formerly of Jones's unit) plus animators Warren Batchelder, Ted Bonnicksen, George Grandpré and Tom Ray. Russ Dyson briefly worked with McKimson in 1956 until Dyson's death that year.

McKimson's office in Warner Bros.'s "Termite Terrace" studio was on the second floor.

== Later career ==
McKimson continued working at Warner Bros. Cartoons as it began to lose staff (including such key personnel as Jones) in the early 1960s. According to an interview with his son, he generally did not like how things were going at the studio and missed full animation, as well as disliking the new characters in the new shorts. Over this time, he directed his share of shorts and worked on the feature The Incredible Mr. Limpet with Hawley Pratt, taking over the role of director from Bill Tytla due to his illness.

After the studio closed, he joined DePatie–Freleng Enterprises, co-owned by his old associate Friz Freleng and David H. DePatie, who had been a producer at the Warners studio. At DePatie–Freleng, McKimson briefly worked in Freleng's unit directing several The Inspector shorts and working on some of the Looney Tunes and Merrie Melodies contracted out to DePatie–Freleng by Warner Bros.

In 1967, Warner opened its animation studio again, with all cartoons directed by Alex Lovy. After Lovy left, McKimson re-joined the studio, in 1968. According to his son Robert McKimson, Jr., McKimson "hated" the cartoons he directed at Warner Bros.-Seven Arts, which suffered from restricted budgets, and he was forbidden from using Bugs Bunny in his cartoons. The studio was shut down again in 1969.

McKimson's last Warner Bros. cartoon was Injun Trouble with Cool Cat. It was shortlisted for an Academy Award, but wasn't nominated. Injun Trouble was also the last of the original Looney Tunes or Merrie Melodies cartoon to be produced before the Warner Bros. cartoon studio was closed. McKimson was the one person to be at the studio from the start of the Looney Tunes series through its finish in 1969, first as an animator and then as a director.

After a sabbatical, he went back to DePatie–Freleng in 1972 to direct The Pink Panther Show shorts, among their other series.

== Death ==
On the morning of September 27, 1977, McKimson's doctor declared him in good health for a 66-year-old (despite having a case of emphysema after years of smoking), and, according to Freleng, McKimson then referred to his family history of living past 90 and bragged, "I'm going to be around after you guys are gone!" On September 29, McKimson suffered a sudden heart attack and died, at age 66. At the time of his death, he had recently completed directing Misterjaw and had begun work on Baggy Pants and the Nitwits.

McKimson was buried at Forest Lawn Cemetery in Glendale, California.

== Personal life ==
McKimson's wife, Viola, died in 1963. In addition to being an animator, McKimson was a skilled horseman and polo player, a dedicated bowler, and a Master Mason. He played polo from 1932 until after the outbreak of war in 1942. In addition to his brothers Tom and Charles, their two sisters, Anabel and Aylce McKimson, also worked as animators. Charles was frequently part of McKimson's unit at Warner Bros.
