= Tasmanian Devil (Looney Tunes) =

Warner Bros. cartoon character

- Looney Tunes/Merrie Melodies character
- First appearance: Devil May Hare (June 19, 1954; 72 years ago)
- Created by: Robert McKimson; Sid Marcus
- Voiced by: Mel Blanc (1954–1989); Jeff Bergman (1990–1994, 1997, 2004, 2014–2015); Noel Blanc (1990); Maurice LaMarche (1990); Greg Burson (1990–1995, 1997); Jim Cummings (1991–present); Dee Bradley Baker (1996); Joe Alaskey (2000, 2004–2005, 2011); Ian James Corlett (Baby Looney Tunes; 2002–2005); Brendan Fraser (2003); Eric Bauza (2018, 2023); Fred Tatasciore (2020–present); Steve Blum (2023) (see below)

In-universe information
- Nickname: Taz
- Species: Tasmanian devil
- Gender: Male
- Family: Slam Tasmanian (descendant); Bugs Bunny (owner) (The Looney Tunes Show)
- Significant other: Tasmanian She-Devil

The Tasmanian Devil (also spelled Tazmanian Devil), commonly referred to as "Taz", is a cartoon character featured in the Warner Bros. Looney Tunes and Merrie Melodies series of cartoons. Though the character appeared in only five shorts before Warner Bros. Cartoons shut down in 1963, marketing and television appearances later propelled Taz to new popularity throughout the 1990s and current adaptations.

== Personality ==
Taz is a Tasmanian devil generally portrayed as a ferocious, albeit dim-witted, carnivore with a notoriously short temper and very little patience. In the short Ducking the Devil, he is described as a "vicious, evil-tempered brute with jaws like a steel trap". He is best known for eating anything in his path and having speech consisting mostly of grunts, growls, and rasps (in his earlier appearances, he does speak English with primitive grammar) as well as his ability to spin like a vortex and bite through nearly anything. While in motion, this character is often depicted as a spinning tornado, drilling himself through trees or soil. He has been portrayed as being calmed by music, though not the bagpipes.

== Creation ==
Robert McKimson designed the character based on the real Tasmanian devil, or more specifically its carnivorous nature, voracious appetite, and surly disposition. A later model sheet was created by animator Ted Bonnicksen.

Owen and Pemberton suggest that the character of the Tasmanian Devil was inspired by Tasmanian actor Errol Flynn. In 1939, apparently at the request of Warner Bros., the Tasmanian State Government had sent three Tasmanian devils to California, where they were presented to the Los Angeles Zoo by Flynn's co-stars the Lane Sisters. Two of the devils escaped from the zoo within months and were reported to be roaming Griffith Park.

== Classic-era appearances ==
In his first appearance in McKimson's Devil May Hare (first released on June 19, 1954), Taz stalks Bugs Bunny, but due to his dimwittedness and inability to frame complete sentences, he serves as little more than a nuisance. Bugs eventually gets rid of him in the most logical way possible: matching him up with an equally insatiable Tasmanian She-Devil. The character's speech, a deep, gravelly voice peppered with growls, screeches, and raspberries, is provided by Mel Blanc. Blanc once stated that he created Taz's voice because no one knew what real Tasmanian devils looked or sounded like at the time. Only occasionally would Taz actually speak, usually to utter some incongruous punchline (e.g. "What for you bury me in the cold, cold ground?"), and yet the character is capable of writing and reading. A running gag is that when Bugs Bunny hears of the approach of Taz, he looks him up in an encyclopedia and starts reading off a list of animals that Taz eats (which is pretty much everything that exists, including "people"). Bugs finds "rabbits" not listed until Taz enters and either points out that "rabbits" are listed or writes rabbits on the list.

After the short film debuted at theaters, Edward Selzer, head producer of the Warner Bros. Cartoons studio, told McKimson to not use Taz anymore, as he found the character to be too obnoxious. After some time with no new Taz shorts, Warner Bros. studio head Jack L. Warner asked what had happened to the character. Warner saved Taz's career when he told Selzer that he had received "boxes and boxes" of letters from people who liked the character and wanted to see more of him.

McKimson would go on to direct four more Taz cartoons, beginning with Bedevilled Rabbit (released on April 13, 1957). McKimson would also pair the Devil with Daffy Duck in Ducking the Devil (August 17, 1957) before pitting him once again against Bugs in Bill of Hare (June 9, 1962) and Dr. Devil and Mr. Hare (March 28, 1964). His last two appearances by the classic Warner Bros. directors, writers, and voice actors were in Bugs Bunny's Looney Christmas Tales appearing in The Fright Before Christmas segment and at the very end eating the sleigh full of presents.

== Later appearances ==
Taz appeared in the 1983 movie Daffy Duck's Fantastic Island as Yosemite Sam's first mate.

Taz was going to have a cameo in the 1988 film Who Framed Roger Rabbit, but was later dropped for unknown reasons.

Taz appeared in various episodes of Tiny Toon Adventures, being the mentor of Dizzy Devil. In the reboot series Tiny Toons Looniversity, he appears as the Coffeehouse owner of Loo Bru. He was voiced by Jeff Bergman, Maurice LaMarche, Noel Blanc and Greg Burson.

In 1991, Taz starred in his own show Taz-Mania, which ran for four seasons; Taz was voiced by long time voice actor Jim Cummings.

Taz appeared in Animaniacs, in the episodes "Draculee, Draculaa/Phranken-Runt" and "Cutie and the Beast/Boo Happens/Noel". He also appeared in "Suffragette City" in the 2020 reboot series.

Taz appeared in an episode of The Sylvester & Tweety Mysteries entitled "The Scare Up There", where he is revealed to have stolen peanut packs from the flights.

Taz appeared in the 1996 feature film Space Jam, as part of the TuneSquad, voiced by Dee Bradley Baker. He also appeared in the 2003 feature film Looney Tunes: Back in Action, voiced by Brendan Fraser.

An infant version of Taz is one of the regular characters in Baby Looney Tunes, voiced by Ian James Corlett.

In the 2004 film Scooby-Doo 2: Monsters Unleashed, Scooby-Doo briefly transforms into the Tasmanian Devil after drinking a potion.

Taz appeared in The Looney Tunes Show episode "Devil Dog", voiced again by Jim Cummings. In the show, he is portrayed walking on four legs like a real Tasmanian Devil and his eyes are bloodshot red (later turned yellow when Bugs uses a taming trick that Speedy Gonzales taught him). Initially, Bugs believed Taz to be a dog and kept him as a house pet much to his roommate Daffy Duck's discomfort. Eventually, Bugs learned the truth and tried to return him to his home in Tasmania, only to find out that Taz would rather live with him, naming him "Poochie". Taz subsequently appears in the following episodes "The Foghorn Leghorn Story", "Newspaper Thief", and "Bugs and Daffy Get a Job". Taz later played a major part in "Ridiculous Journey" where he, Sylvester (whom Taz tried to eat) and Tweety were accidentally sent to Alaska by Yosemite Sam. The three of them work to get home while encountering other characters and avoiding tracker Blacque Jacque Shellacque. Eventually, they make it home when it turned out that Blacque was hired by Yosemite Sam to retrieve the three on behalf of Bugs and Granny.

Taz originally appeared in the series Wabbit as Theodore Tasmanian, an accountant at Chesterfield Consultants who tries to repress his vicious side. Unlike most versions of the character, he spoke more coherently. He was also married and had a child. Taz eventually returned to his original characterization and way of speaking when the series was retooled as New Looney Tunes.

An alternate version of Taz appeared in the 2017 DC Comics/Looney Tunes crossover comics, where he was designed more for the DC Universe and faced off against Wonder Woman in the Wonder Woman/Tasmanian Devil Special. In the story, Taz is a Guardian of the Labyrinth on Themyscira and fought Diana when she was a teenager during her trials to become an Amazon warrior. Before Taz could attack her, Diana plays the harp and puts it to sleep before snipping off some of his fur as proof of her victory. She returns to Taz years later as Wonder Woman after Circe uses the Talisman of Eurytale to turn Hippolyta and the other Amazons into stone. As the Talisman can only be stopped by the Minotaur's Amulet, she requests Taz's help as Taz's connection to the other Guardians would lead them down the right path. During the journey, Taz reveals that he wasn't mad at Diana for tricking him, but was rather upset that she took the music away. The two defeat the Minotaur and Circe and the Amazons reward him with a large feast in return. In the issue's backup story (done more in the style of the classic Looney Tunes shorts), Diana sings to Taz the tale of the Trojan War with her and the Looney Tunes characters roleplaying the major players, but Taz in his dream alters the events to work out more in his favor.

Taz first appears in the Looney Tunes Cartoons special Bugs Bunny's 24-Carrot Holiday Special, where he is a caroler. Taz appears as a gladiator in the episode Taziator. While he is more like most depictions, he actually speaks more comprehensible English. He is voiced by Fred Tatasciore in these appearances.

Taz appears in the 2021 feature film Space Jam: A New Legacy, with Tatasciore reprising the role and additional dialogue done by Cummings.

Taz appears in the preschool series Bugs Bunny Builders, voiced again by Tatasciore.

Taz appears in the 2023 direct-to-video film Taz: Quest for Burger, voiced by Steve Blum. He speaks comprehensible English and has a raspy voice.

On June 16, 2023, it was announced Taz would appear in a stop-motion short animated by Hanna-Barbera Studios Europe.

Taz appears in the Teen Titans Go! episode, "Warner Bros. 100th Anniversary". He is among the Looney Tunes characters guests for the Warner Bros. centennial celebration, with Tatasciore reprising his role.

Taz appears in the 2026 film Coyote vs. Acme, voiced by Jim Cummings. He plays the role of Acme's Head of PR, being described as a "master of spin".

== Voice actors ==
- Mel Blanc (1954–1989, Looney Tunes River Ride (1991); archive recordings, Yosemite Sam and the Gold River Adventure! (1992); archive recordings, Bugs Bunny Goin' Hollywood (1992); archive recordings, KFC Looney Tunes Mugs commercial (1995); archive footage)
- Jeff Bergman (Tiny Toon Adventures, Taz-Mania (Sega Genesis version), Taz in Escape from Mars, Chasers Anonymous, Boomerang bumper, Looney Tunes Dash, Who Stole My Chicken?)
- Noel Blanc (You Rang? answering machine messages, Tiny Toon Adventures)
- Maurice LaMarche (Tiny Toon Adventures)
- Greg Burson (Bugs Bunny's Birthday Ball, Discover the World with Bugs Bunny, Tiny Toon Adventures, Taz-Mania (Super NES version), The Toonite Show Starring Bugs Bunny, Bugs Bunny: Rabbit Rampage, Looney Tunes B-Ball, Warner Bros. Kids Club)
- Jim Cummings (Taz-Mania, Have Yourself a Looney Tunes Christmas, Hip-Hop Hare, Bugs & Daffy Sing the Beatles, Animaniacs, The Sylvester & Tweety Mysteries, Superior Duck, Bugs & Friends Sing Elvis, Bugs Bunny's Learning Adventures, Looney Tunes: What's Up Rock?!, Tweety's High-Flying Adventure, Histeria!, Duck Dodgers, Bah, Humduck! A Looney Tunes Christmas, The Looney Tunes Show, Looney Tunes Dash (Taz levels only), New Looney Tunes, Ani-Mayhem, Space Jam: A New Legacy (additional lines), Looney Tunes: Wacky World of Sports, Coyote vs. Acme, various commercials, video games and webtoons)
- Keith Scott (Looney Tunes Musical Revue, The Christmas Looney Tunes Classic Collection, Spectacular Light and Sound Show Illuminanza, KFC commercial, Looney Tunes: We Got the Beat!, Looney Tunes LIVE! Classroom Capers, The Looney Tunes Radio Show, Looney Tunes Christmas Carols)
- Dee Bradley Baker (Space Jam)
- Frank Welker (The Junkyard Run)
- Joe Alaskey (The Looney Tunes Kwazy Christmas, Looney Tunes webtoons, Looney Tunes ClickN READ Phonics)
- Ian James Corlett (Baby Looney Tunes, Baby Looney Tunes' Eggs-traordinary Adventure)
- Brendan Fraser (Looney Tunes: Back in Action)
- Neil Fanning (Scooby-Doo 2: Monsters Unleashed)
- Eric Bauza (Looney Tunes: World of Mayhem, ACME Fools, Warner Bros. World Abu Dhabi commercial)
- Fred Tatasciore (Looney Tunes Cartoons, Space Jam: A New Legacy, Bugs Bunny Builders, Tiny Toons Looniversity, MultiVersus, Teen Titans Go!)
- Mike Henry (Family Guy)
- Steve Blum (Taz: Quest for Burger)

== Home media ==
All five of the original Taz cartoons are included in Looney Tunes Platinum Collection: Volume 1, along with "The Fright Before Christmas".

== In popular culture ==
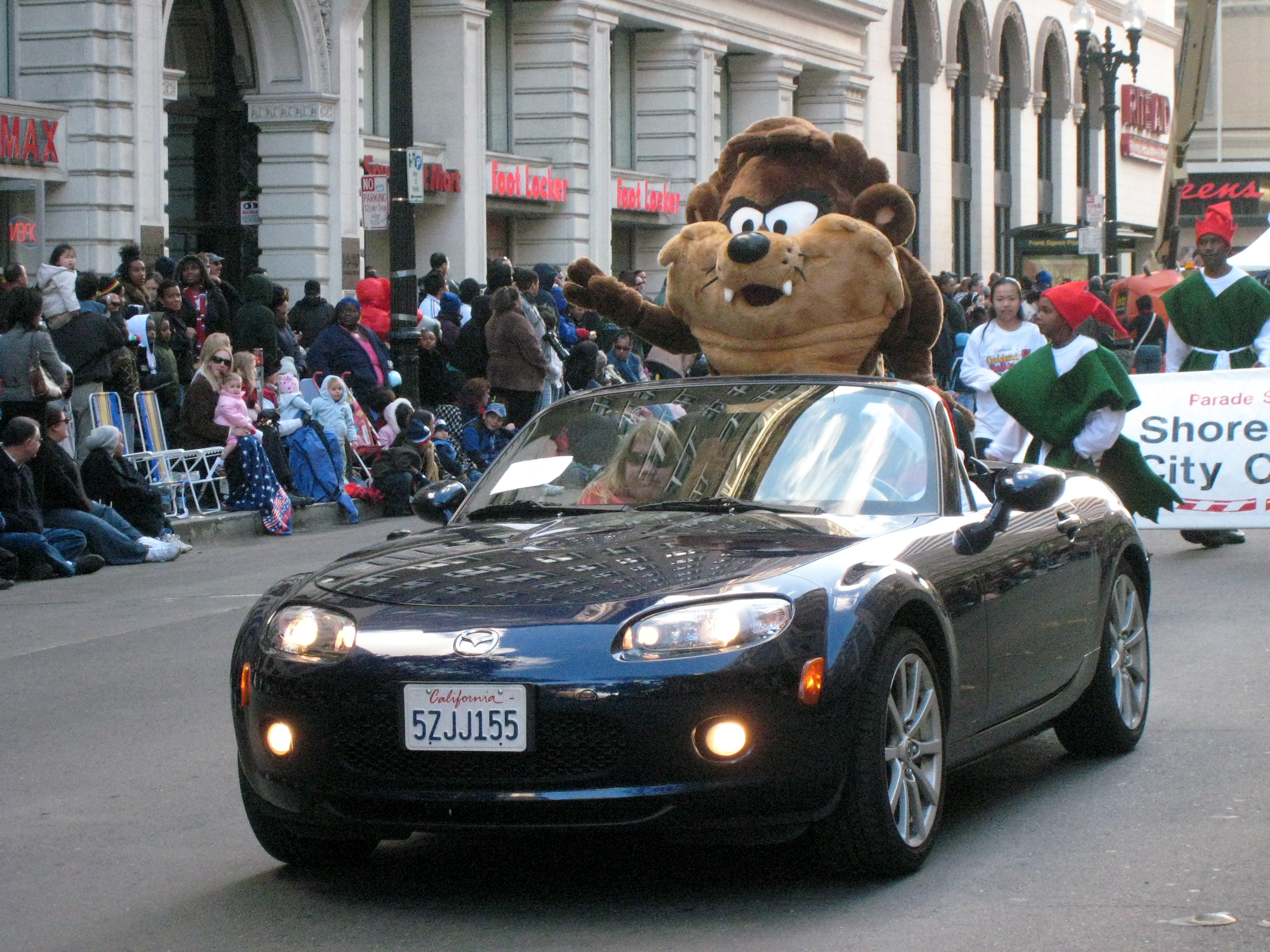
A Taz costume at a Christmas parade in Oakland, California

The character's first video game outing was in a title from the later days of the Atari 2600, in a 1983 release entitled Taz. The 1990s saw a return of the character to video games in Taz-Mania and its semi-sequel Taz in Escape from Mars. Both titles appeared on the Mega Drive/Genesis, Master System & Game Gear systems. There were other Taz-Mania games released on the Nintendo SNES and Game Boy systems. He also costarred in the PlayStation/PC game Bugs Bunny & Taz: Time Busters, and in 2002's Taz: Wanted on PlayStation 2, GameCube, Xbox and PC. He also appeared in the video games The Bugs Bunny Crazy Castle 2, The Bugs Bunny Birthday Blowout, Looney Tunes: Acme Arsenal, Looney Tunes: Space Race, Bugs Bunny Crazy Castle 3, Bugs Bunny in Crazy Castle 4, Looney Tunes: Back in Action, and Galactic Taz Ball. He was even the inspiration for a video game character himself, namely Crash Bandicoot.

In the late 1990s to early 2000s, when Chevrolet used the Looney Tunes as part of their NASCAR campaign, the Chevrolet Monte Carlo racing teams were referenced as Team Monte Carlo, with the Tasmanian Devil as the mascot.

Taz was a chocolate bar by Cadbury in the UK during the '90s and was later renamed Freddo Caramel.

Professional wrestler Peter Senercia adopted "Taz" and the variant spelling "Tazz" as his ring names.

In Scooby-Doo 2: Monsters Unleashed (2004), Taz is one of the forms Scooby-Doo briefly takes upon accidentally drinking a chemical substance.

From 2005 to 2010, a custom-bodied Taz monster truck competed in the Monster Jam circuit, driven by Adam Anderson. Adam drove the truck to the Monster Jam World Finals Freestyle championship in 2008. It was retired in 2010, with a Scooby-Doo-themed truck being its replacement debuting in 2013.

Taz appeared in a 2014 GEICO commercial, where he drinks a "certain energy drink" and goes on a rampage.

In June 2017, the character appeared in the Wonder Woman / Tasmanian Devil Special #1, written by Tony Bedard with art by Barry Kitson. This version is reimagined as a Guardian of the Labyrinth on Themyscira, whom Wonder Woman defeated when she was a teenager, but later teams up with her to save the Amazons from Circe.

In April 2017, Taz appeared in a Funko Pop! and has appeared in three more since.

Taz appears as a playable character in the fighting game MultiVersus, with Jim Cummings reprising his role.

== Trademark ==
Warner Bros' trademark on the character has raised a number of issues with entities in the Australian state of Tasmania, where the Tasmanian devil is common and emblematic.

1997

In 1997, a newspaper report noted that Warner Bros had "trademarked the character and registered the name Tasmanian Devil", and that this trademark "was policed", including an eight-year legal battle to allow a Tasmanian company to call its fishing lure the "Tasmanian Devil". Debate followed, and a delegation from the Tasmanian state government met with Warner Bros. Ray Groom, the Tourism Minister, later announced that a "verbal agreement" had been reached. An annual fee would be paid to Warner Bros in return for the Government of Tasmania being able to use the image of Taz for "marketing purposes". This agreement later lapsed.

In 1997, the Tasmanian government and Warner Bros. disputed the government's right to use the character as a tourism promotion, which was offered only if a fee was paid. The government refused to pay a fee to Warner Bros.

2006

In 2006, after much lobbying from the Tasmanian government, Warner Bros decided to assist the fight against extinction of the Tasmanian devil due to devil facial tumour disease (DFTD). Tasmanian Environment Minister Judy Jackson, prior to the agreement, had heavily criticised Warner Bros., stating that the company had made millions of dollars from the character, but did not put up any money when other companies had.

The deal with Warner Bros allowed the Tasmanian government to manufacture and sell up to 5,000 special edition Taz plush toys, with all profit going towards funding scientific research into DFTD. The deal also aimed to increase public attention towards the threatening disease.

2023

Potential issues surrounding Warner's trademark were raised after the May 2023 announcement that the Australian Football League's 19th team licence would be given to Tasmania, as the team was widely rumoured to be wanting to use the name Tasmania Devils. The trademark issues were settled and the team was announced as the Devils in March 2024.

== Bibliography ==
- Adamson, Joe (1990). Bugs Bunny: 50 Years and Only One Grey Hare. New York: Henry Holt & Co. ISBN 978-0-8050-1190-6.
- Schneider, Steve (1988). That's All Folks!: The Art of Warner Bros. Animation. New York: Henry Holt & Co. ISBN 978-0-8050-0889-0.
