= Noel Blanc =

American voice actor (born 1938)

- Born: Noel Barton Blanc; October 19, 1938 (age 88); Los Angeles, California, U.S.
- Occupations: Voice actor; commercial producer
- Years active: 1951–present
- Spouses: Larraine Zax (m. 1967; div. 1972) Martha Smith (m. 1977; div. 1986) Katherine Hushaw (m. 1998)
- Father: Mel Blanc

Noel Barton Blanc (born October 19, 1938) is an American commercial producer and retired voice actor. He is the son of the late legendary cartoon voice actor Mel Blanc who was nicknamed the Man of a Thousand Voices.

== Early life and career ==
Blanc was born on October 19, 1938, in Los Angeles, California. He is the only child of voice actor Mel Blanc. Throughout Noel's childhood, adolescence and early adulthood, he worked with his father on the Looney Tunes cartoons, with Mel training him in the field of voice characterization. In 1961, Noel performed some of Mel's voices, uncredited, when Mel was injured in a car crash. (Note: Attributed to multiple references:) On January 29, 1962, they formed Blanc Communications Corporation, a media company which remains in operation. Together, they produced over 5,000 public service announcements and commercials, appearing with Kirk Douglas, Lucille Ball, Vincent Price, Phyllis Diller, Liberace, and The Who. Kirk Douglas' son, Joel, served as one of the executives at Blanc Communications Corporation and helped to develop and produce commercials until the late 1980s.

Following Mel Blanc's death in 1989, Noel voiced Bugs Bunny, Daffy Duck, Elmer Fudd (a character that was originally Arthur Q. Bryan's role that Mel occasionally performed during Bryan's lifetime and inherited after Bryan's death), the Tasmanian Devil, Porky Pig, Tweety and other characters in Tiny Toon Adventures and a series of You Rang? answering machine messages; he was one of several successors to his father in the immediate aftermath of Mel's death, with others including Jeff Bergman, Joe Alaskey, Bob Bergen, Greg Burson, Maurice LaMarche, Billy West and most recently Eric Bauza. Warner Bros. had been splitting up the various voice-acting roles to prevent any one of them from being a singular successor. He later contributed voice work to Stewie Griffin: The Untold Story.

== Personal life ==
=== Relationships and marriages ===
Blanc has been married three times; he first married Larraine Zax in 1967; they divorced in 1972. Blanc then married actress Martha Smith in 1977; the marriage lasted for nine years, until they divorced in 1986. Blanc married his third wife, Katherine Hushaw, at the Warner Bros. Studios on June 3, 1998.

=== Helicopter incident ===
In February 1991, Blanc was injured in his personal helicopter when the aircraft collided with a small plane above Santa Paula Airport. Two other people were also injured, including Kirk Douglas, and two people in the plane were killed. Blanc suffered multiple fractures to his right leg, five broken ribs, a bruised lung, and a bruised kidney. He was taken to the intensive care unit at Santa Paula Hospital.

== Filmography ==
=== Television and film ===
Year	Title	Role	Notes
1960	Dog Gone People	Kid on Television	Uncredited
1990–1992	Tiny Toon Adventures	Porky Pig; Tasmanian Devil; The Great and Powerful Principal; Bugs Bunny	6 episodes
1992	The Plucky Duck Show	Additional Voices	
1993	General Electric's Carousel of Progress	Radio Personalities	
2001	2001 Chevrolet Monte Carlo 400	Himself, Bugs Bunny, Daffy Duck, Tweety	Televised stock car race
2005	Stewie Griffin: The Untold Story	Elmer Fudd	Direct-to-video
2005	Family Guy	Elmer Fudd	Episode: "Stewie B. Goode"

=== Video games ===
- Bugs Bunny's Birthday Ball – Bugs Bunny (vocal effects), Daffy Duck (saying "Happy Birthday, Bugs!"), Yosemite Sam, Sylvester ("oofs" and "ows"), Speedy Gonzales, Barnyard Dawg, Chickens

=== Documentaries ===
- This Is Your Life – Himself
- Roger Rabbit and the Secrets of Toontown – Himself
- 50 Years of Bugs Bunny in 3^{1}/_{2} Minutes – Porky Pig
- Happy Birthday, Bugs!: 50 Looney Years – Himself, Porky Pig
- What's Up Doc? A Salut/refe to Bugs Bunny – Himself
- Entertaining the Troops – Himself
- Behind the Tunes – Himself
- 100 Greatest Cartoons – Himself
- The Chuck Woolery Show – Himself
- Vicki! – Himself
- Friz on Film – Himself
- Mel Blanc: The Man of a Thousand Voices – Himself
- King-Size Comedy: Tex Avery and the Looney Tunes Revolution – Himself
- I Know That Voice – Himself

=== Theme park attractions ===
- Tomorrowland – Radio Personalities
- Carousel of Progress – Cuckoo Clock, Radio Personalities
- The Looney Tunes Revue – Bugs Bunny, Daffy Duck, Porky Pig, Pepé Le Pew, Yosemite Sam, Sylvester, Sylvester Jr., Tweety, Speedy Gonzales, Foghorn Leghorn, Henery Hawk, Tasmanian Devil
- Rabbit-cadabbra – Bugs Bunny (one line)
- Looney Tunes River Ride – Marc Antony

=== Discography ===
- Looney Tunes: Love Songs for My Valentine – Bugs Bunny, Porky Pig
- You Rang?: Bugs Bunny – Bugs Bunny, Elmer Fudd, Tasmanian Devil, Daffy Duck, Porky Pig, Pepé Le Pew, Yosemite Sam, Speedy Gonzales
- You Rang?: Daffy Duck – Daffy Duck, Bugs Bunny, Elmer Fudd, Yosemite Sam, Pepé Le Pew, Tasmanian Devil, Speedy Gonzales
- You Rang?: Porky Pig – Porky Pig, Daffy Duck, Bugs Bunny, Elmer Fudd, Yosemite Sam, Pepé Le Pew, Speedy Gonzales, Foghorn Leghorn, Chicken Little
- You Rang?: Sylvester and Tweety – Sylvester, Tweety, Porky Pig, Daffy Duck, Elmer Fudd, Yosemite Sam, Foghorn Leghorn, Speedy Gonzales, Pepé Le Pew
- You Rang?: Holidays and Special Occasions – Porky Pig, Daffy Duck, Foghorn Leghorn, Elmer Fudd, Yosemite Sam, Bugs Bunny, Sylvester, Tweety, Speedy Gonzales
- Bugs Bunny and the Pink Flamingos – Porky Pig
- Bugs Bunny at the Symphony – Porky Pig

== Notes ==
Preceded by Jeff Bergman	Voice of Porky Pig; 1990	Succeeded by Bob Bergen
Preceded by Jeff Bergman	Voice of Tasmanian Devil; 1990	Succeeded by Maurice LaMarche
Preceded by Chris Edgerly	Voice of Elmer Fudd; 2005	Succeeded by Quinton Flynn
