= Bugs Bunny =

Cartoon character; mascot of Warner Bros.

- Looney Tunes/Merrie Melodies character
- First appearance: Porky's Hare Hunt (April 30, 1938; 88 years ago)
- Created by: Ben Hardaway; Tex Avery; Chuck Jones
- Designed by: Cal Dalton; Charles Thorson; Bob Givens (1940–1943); Robert McKimson (1943–)
- Voiced by: Mel Blanc (1938–1989); Jeff Bergman (1990–1993, 1997–1998, 2002–2004, 2007, 2011–present); Greg Burson (1990–2000); Billy West (1996–2006); Joe Alaskey (1997–2011); Sam Vincent (Baby Looney Tunes; 2002–2005); Eric Bauza (2018–2026) (see below)

In-universe information
- Species: Hare/Rabbit
- Gender: Male
- Significant other: Lola Bunny (girlfriend)
- Relatives: Clyde Bunny (nephew); Ace Bunny (descendant)

Bugs Bunny is a cartoon character created in the late 1930s at Warner Bros. Cartoons (originally Leon Schlesinger Productions) and voiced originally by Mel Blanc. Bugs is best known for his featured roles in the Looney Tunes and Merrie Melodies series of animated short films, released by Warner Bros. Pictures. Earlier iterations of the character first began appearing in Ben Hardaway's Porky's Hare Hunt (1938). Hardaway refined the character until Tex Avery's A Wild Hare (1940) introduced his definitive characteristics. He was given the name Bugs Bunny in Elmer's Pet Rabbit (1941). Bob Givens, Chuck Jones, and Robert McKimson are credited for defining Bugs's visual design.

Bugs is an anthropomorphic gray-and-white rabbit or hare who is characterized by his flippant, insouciant personality, his Brooklyn accent, and his catchphrase "Eh... What's up, doc?". He is typically portrayed as a trickster, outwitting foes like Elmer Fudd and Yosemite Sam as well as various authority figures and criminals. He develops a friendly rivalry with Daffy Duck. Through his popularity during the golden age of American animation, Bugs became an American cultural icon and Warner Bros.' official mascot.

Bugs starred in more than 160 short films produced between 1940 and 1964. He has since appeared in feature films, television shows, comics, and other media. He has appeared in more films than any other cartoon character, is the ninth most-portrayed film personality in the world and has his own star on the Hollywood Walk of Fame.

== Development ==
Bugs' preliminary debut (as an unnamed white rabbit) in Porky's Hare Hunt (1938)

According to Chase Craig, who wrote and drew the first Bugs Bunny comic Sunday pages and the first Bugs comic book, "Bugs was not the creation of any one man; however, he rather represented the creative talents of perhaps five or six directors and many cartoon writers including Charlie Thorson. In those days, the stories were often the work of a group who suggested various gags, bounced them around and finalized them in a joint story conference." A prototype Bugs rabbit with some of the personality of a finalized Bugs, though looking very different, was originally featured in the film Porky's Hare Hunt, released on April 30, 1938. It was directed by Ben "Bugs" Hardaway. This cartoon has an almost identical plot to Avery's Porky's Duck Hunt (1937), which had introduced Daffy Duck. Porky Pig is again cast as a hunter tracking a silly prey who is more interested in driving his pursuer insane and less interested in escaping. Hare Hunt replaces the little black duck with a small white rabbit. According to Friz Freleng, Hardaway and Dalton had decided to "dress the duck in a rabbit suit". The white rabbit had an oval head and a shapeless body. In characterization, he was "a rural buffoon". Mel Blanc gave the character a voice and laugh much like those he later used for Woody Woodpecker. He was loud, zany with a goofy, guttural laugh. The rabbit character was popular enough with audiences that the Termite Terrace staff decided to use it again.

The rabbit comes back in Prest-O Change-O (1939), directed by Chuck Jones, where he is the pet rabbit of unseen character Sham-Fu the Magician. Two dogs, fleeing the local dogcatcher, enter the rabbit's absent master's house. The rabbit harasses them but is ultimately bested by the bigger of the two dogs. This version of the rabbit retained the guttural laugh but was otherwise silent.

The rabbit's third appearance comes in Hare-um Scare-um (1939), directed again by Dalton and Hardaway. This cartoon—the first in which he is depicted as a gray bunny instead of a white one—is also notable as the rabbit's first singing role. Charles Thorson, lead animator on the film, gave the character a name. He had written "Bugs's Bunny" on the model sheet that he drew for Hardaway. In promotional material for the cartoon, including a surviving 1939 presskit, the name on the model sheet was altered to become the rabbit's own name: "Bugs" Bunny (quotation marks only used, on and off, until 1944).

In his autobiography, Blanc claimed that another proposed name for the character was "Happy Rabbit." In the actual cartoons and publicity, however, the name "Happy" only seems to have been used in reference to Bugs Hardaway. In Hare-um Scare-um, a newspaper headline reads, "Happy Hardaway." Animation historian David Gerstein disputed that "Happy Rabbit" was ever used as an official name, arguing that the only usage of the term came from Blanc himself in humorous and fanciful tales he told about the character's development in the 1970s and 1980s; the name "Bugs Bunny" was used as early as August 1939, in the Motion Picture Herald, in a review for Hare-um Scare-um.

Thorson had been approached by Tedd Pierce, head of the story department, and asked to design a better look for the rabbit. The decision was influenced by Thorson's experience in designing hares. He had designed Max Hare in Toby Tortoise Returns (Disney, 1936). For Hardaway, Thorson created the model sheet previously mentioned, with six different rabbit poses. Thorson's model sheet is "a comic rendition of the stereotypical fuzzy bunny". He had a pear-shaped body with a protruding rear end. His face was flat and had large expressive eyes. He had an exaggerated long neck, gloved hands with three fingers, oversized feet, and a "smart aleck" grin. The result was influenced by Walt Disney Animation Studios' tendency to draw animals in the style of cute infants. He had an obvious Disney influence, but looked like an awkward merger of the lean and streamlined Max Hare from The Tortoise and the Hare (1935) and the round, soft bunnies from Little Hiawatha (1937).

In Jones' Elmer's Candid Camera (1940), the rabbit first meets Elmer Fudd. This time the rabbit looks more like the present-day Bugs, taller and with a similar face—but retaining the more primitive voice. Candid Camera's Elmer character design is also different: taller and chubbier in the face than the modern model, though Arthur Q. Bryan's character voice is already established.

=== Official debut ===
Bugs' first appearance in A Wild Hare (1940)

While Porky's Hare Hunt was the first Warner Bros. cartoon to feature what would become Bugs Bunny, A Wild Hare, directed by Tex Avery and released on July 27, 1940, is considered by Warner Bros. to be the first official Bugs Bunny cartoon. It is the first film where both Elmer Fudd and Bugs, both redesigned by Bob Givens, are shown in their fully developed forms as hunter and tormentor, respectively; the first in which Mel Blanc uses what became Bugs' standard voice; and the first in which Bugs uses his catchphrase, "What's up, Doc?" A Wild Hare was a huge success in theaters and received an Academy Award nomination for Best Cartoon Short Subject.

For the film, Avery asked Givens to remodel the rabbit. The result had a closer resemblance to Max Hare. He had a more elongated body, stood more erect, and looked more poised. Blanc gave Bugs the voice of a city slicker with a New York accent, a voice used by Avery in various cartoons purely for comedic effect. The rabbit was as audacious as he had been in Hare-um Scare-um and as cool and collected as in Prest-O Change-O.

Immediately following on A Wild Hare, Bob Clampett's Patient Porky (1940) features a cameo appearance by Bugs, announcing to the audience that 750 rabbits have been born. The gag uses Bugs' Wild Hare visual design, but his goofier pre-Wild Hare voice characterization.

The second full-fledged role for the mature Bugs, Chuck Jones' Elmer's Pet Rabbit (1941), is the first to name Bugs as such. However, Bugs' voice and personality in this cartoon is noticeably different, and his design was slightly altered as well; Bugs' visual design is based on the earlier version in Candid Camera and A Wild Hare, but with yellow gloves, as seen in Hare-Um Scare-Um, and no buck teeth, has a lower-pitched voice and a more aggressive, arrogant and thuggish personality instead of a fun-loving personality. After Pet Rabbit, however, subsequent Bugs appearances returned to normal: the Wild Hare visual design and personality returned, and Blanc re-used the Wild Hare voice characterization.

Hiawatha's Rabbit Hunt (1941), directed by Friz Freleng, became the second Bugs Bunny cartoon to receive an Academy Award nomination. The fact that it did not win the award was later spoofed somewhat in What's Cookin' Doc? (1944), in which Bugs demands a recount (claiming to be a victim of "sa-bo-TAH-gee") after losing the Oscar to James Cagney and presents a clip from Hiawatha's Rabbit Hunt to prove his point.

=== World War II ===
Evolution of Bugs' design over the years

By 1942, Bugs had become the number one star of Merrie Melodies. The series was originally intended only for one-shot characters in films after several early attempts to introduce characters (Foxy, Goopy Geer, and Piggy) failed under Harman–Ising. By the mid-1930s, under Leon Schlesinger, Merrie Melodies started introducing newer characters. Bugs Bunny Gets the Boid (1942) shows a slight redesign of Bugs, with less-prominent front teeth and a rounder head. The character was later reworked by Robert McKimson, then an animator in Clampett's unit, for Tortoise Wins by a Hare (1943), with more-slanted eyes, longer teeth and a much larger mouth. The redesign at first was only used in the films created by Clampett's unit, but in time it was taken up by the other directors, with Freleng and Frank Tashlin the first. McKimson would use another version of the rabbit by Jean Blanchard until 1949 (as did Art Davis for the one Bugs Bunny film he directed, Bowery Bugs) when he started using the version he had designed for Clampett. Jones came up with his own slight modification, and the voice had slight variations between the units. Bugs also made cameos in Avery's final Warner Bros. cartoon, Crazy Cruise.

Since Bugs' fifth appearance in A Wild Hare, he appeared in color Looney Tunes and Merrie Melodies films (making him one of the few recurring characters created for the series in the Schlesinger era prior to the full conversion to color), alongside Egghead, Inki, Sniffles, and Elmer Fudd (who actually co-existed in 1937 along with Egghead as a separate character). While Bugs made a cameo in Porky Pig's Feat (1943), this was his only appearance in a black-and-white Looney Tunes film. He did not star in a Looney Tunes film until that series made its complete conversion to only color cartoons beginning in 1944. Buckaroo Bugs was Bugs' first film in the Looney Tunes series and was also the last Warner Bros. cartoon to credit Schlesinger (as he had retired and sold his studio to Warner Bros. that year).

Bugs' popularity soared during World War II because of his free and easy attitude, and he began receiving special star billing in his cartoons by 1943. By that time, Warner Bros. had become the most profitable cartoon studio in the United States. In company with cartoon studios such as Disney and Famous Studios, Warners pitted its characters against Adolf Hitler, Benito Mussolini, Francisco Franco, and the Japanese Empire. Bugs Bunny Nips the Nips (1944) features Bugs at odds with a group of Japanese soldiers. This cartoon has since been pulled from distribution due to its depiction of Japanese people. One US Navy propaganda film saved from destruction features the voice of Mel Blanc in Tokyo Woes (1945) about the propaganda radio host Tokyo Rose. He also faces off against Hermann Göring and Hitler in Herr Meets Hare (1945), which introduced his well-known reference to Albuquerque, New Mexico as he mistakenly winds up in the Black Forest of "Joimany" instead of Las Vegas, Nevada. Bugs also appeared in the 1942 two-minute U.S. war bonds commercial film Any Bonds Today?, along with Porky and Elmer.

At the end of Super-Rabbit (1943), Bugs appears wearing a United States Marine Corps dress blue uniform. As a result, the Marine Corps made Bugs an honorary Marine master sergeant. From 1943 to 1946, Bugs was the official mascot of Kingman Army Airfield, Kingman, Arizona, where thousands of aerial gunners were trained during World War II. Some notable trainees included Clark Gable and Charles Bronson. Bugs also served as the mascot for 530 Squadron of the 380th Bombardment Group, Fifth Air Force, United States Air Force, which was attached to the Royal Australian Air Force and operated out of Australia's Northern Territory from 1943 to 1945, flying Consolidated B-24 Liberator heavy bombers. Bugs riding an air-delivered torpedo served as the squadron logo for Marine Torpedo/Bomber Squadron 242 in the Second World War. Additionally, Bugs appeared on the nose of B-24J #42-110157, in both the 855th Bomb Squadron of the 491st Bombardment Group (Heavy) and later in the 786th BS of the 466th BG(H), both being part of the 8th Air Force operating out of England.

In 1944, Bugs Bunny made a cameo appearance in Jasper Goes Hunting, a Puppetoons film produced by rival studio Paramount Pictures. In this cameo (animated by McKimson, with Blanc providing the usual voice), Bugs (after being threatened at gunpoint) pops out of a rabbit hole, saying his usual catchphrase; after hearing the orchestra play the wrong theme song, he realizes, "Hey, I'm in the wrong picture!" and then goes back in the hole. Bugs also made a cameo in the Private Snafu short Gas, in which he is found stowed away in the titular private's belongings; his only spoken line is his usual catchphrase. He also made a silent cameo in another Private Snafu short titled Three Brothers, in which Fubar takes him out of his rabbit hole and hides inside it to avoid attack dogs.

Although it was usually Porky Pig who brought the Looney Tunes films to a close with his stuttering, "That's all, folks!", Bugs replaced him at the end of Hare Tonic and Baseball Bugs, bursting through a drum just as Porky did, but munching on a carrot and saying, in his Bronx/Brooklyn accent, "And that's the end!"

=== Post-World War II era ===
After World War II, Bugs continued to appear in numerous Warner Bros. cartoons, making his last "Golden Age" appearance in False Hare (1964). He starred in over 167 theatrical short films, most of which were directed by Friz Freleng, Robert McKimson, and Chuck Jones. Freleng's Knighty Knight Bugs (1958), in which a medieval Bugs trades blows with Yosemite Sam and his fire-breathing dragon (which has a cold), won an Academy Award for Best Cartoon Short Subject (becoming the first and only Bugs Bunny cartoon to win that award). Three of Jones' films—Rabbit Fire, Rabbit Seasoning and Duck! Rabbit, Duck!—comprise what is often referred to as the "Rabbit Season/Duck Season" trilogy and were the origins of the rivalry between Bugs and Daffy Duck. Jones' classic What's Opera, Doc? (1957), casts Bugs and Elmer Fudd in a parody of Richard Wagner's Der Ring des Nibelungen (1876). It was deemed "culturally significant" by the United States Library of Congress and selected for preservation in the National Film Registry in 1992, becoming the first cartoon short to receive this honor.

In the fall of 1960, ABC debuted the prime-time television program The Bugs Bunny Show. This show packaged many of the post-1948 Warners cartoons with newly animated wraparounds. Throughout its run, the series was highly successful, and helped cement Warner Bros. Animation as a mainstay of Saturday-morning cartoons. After two seasons, it was moved from its evening slot to reruns on Saturday mornings. The Bugs Bunny Show changed format and exact title frequently but remained on network television for 40 years. The packaging was later completely different, with each cartoon simply presented on its own, title and all, though some clips from the new bridging material were sometimes used as filler.

=== Later years ===
Bugs did not appear in any of the post-1964 Looney Tunes and Merrie Melodies films produced by DePatie–Freleng Enterprises or Seven Arts Productions, nor did he appear in Filmation's Daffy Duck and Porky Pig Meet the Groovie Goolies. He did, however, have two cameo appearances in the 1974 Joe Adamson short A Political Cartoon; one at the beginning of the short where he campaigns on behalf of equal rights for cartoon characters everywhere, and another in which he is interviewed at a pet store, where he is on sale as an "Easter Rabbit". Bugs was animated in this short by Mark Kausler. He did not appear in new material on-screen again until Bugs and Daffy's Carnival of the Animals aired in 1976.

From the late 1970s through the early 1990s, Bugs was featured in various animated specials for network television, such as Bugs Bunny's Thanksgiving Diet, Bugs Bunny's Easter Special, Bugs Bunny's Looney Christmas Tales, and Bugs Bunny's Bustin' Out All Over. Bugs also starred in several theatrical compilation features during this time, including the United Artists distributed documentary Bugs Bunny: Superstar (1975) and Warner Bros.' own releases: The Bugs Bunny/Road Runner Movie (1979), The Looney Looney Looney Bugs Bunny Movie (1981), Bugs Bunny's 3rd Movie: 1001 Rabbit Tales (1982), and Daffy Duck's Quackbusters (1988).

In the 1988 live-action animated fantasy comedy Who Framed Roger Rabbit, Bugs appeared as one of the inhabitants of Toontown. However, since the film was being produced by Disney, Warner Bros. would only allow the use of their biggest star if he got an equal amount of screen time as Disney's biggest star, Mickey Mouse. Because of this, both characters are always together in frame when onscreen. Bugs was animated by Dave Spafford. Roger Rabbit was also one of the final productions in which Mel Blanc voiced Bugs (as well as the other Looney Tunes characters) before his death in 1989.

Bugs later appeared in another animated production featuring numerous characters from rival studios: the 1990 drug prevention TV special Cartoon All-Stars to the Rescue. This special is notable for being the first time that someone other than Blanc voiced Bugs and Daffy, both characters being voiced by Jeff Bergman for the program. Bugs also made guest appearances in the early 1990s television series Tiny Toon Adventures, as the principal of Acme Looniversity and the mentor of Babs and Buster Bunny. He made further cameos in Warner Bros.' subsequent animated TV shows Taz-Mania, Animaniacs, and Histeria!

Bugs returned to the silver screen in Box-Office Bunny (1991). This was the first Bugs Bunny cartoon since 1964 to be released in theaters and it was created for Bugs' 50th anniversary celebration. It was followed by (Blooper) Bunny, a cartoon that was shelved from theaters, but later premiered on Cartoon Network in 1997 and has since gained a cult following among animation fans for its edgy humor. Later that year, Bugs appeared in Yakety Yak, Take It Back, a live-action animated all-star public service music video produced by Warner Bros. Animation for the Take It Back Foundation. He also appeared in the logo for Warner Bros. Family Entertainment, animated by Bill Waldman.

In 1996, Bugs and the other Looney Tunes characters appeared in the live-action animated film, Space Jam, directed by Joe Pytka and starring NBA superstar Michael Jordan. The film also introduced the character Lola Bunny, who becomes Bugs' new love interest. Space Jam received mixed reviews from critics, but was a box office success (grossing over $230 million worldwide). The success of Space Jam led to the development of another live-action animated film, Looney Tunes: Back in Action, released in 2003 and directed by Joe Dante. Unlike Space Jam, Back in Action was a box-office bomb, though it did receive more positive reviews from critics.

In 1997, Bugs appeared on a U.S. postage stamp, the first cartoon to be so honored, beating the iconic Mickey Mouse. The stamp is number seven on the list of the ten most popular U.S. stamps, as calculated by the number of stamps purchased but not used. The introduction of Bugs onto a stamp was controversial at the time, as it was seen as a step toward the 'commercialization' of stamp art. The postal service rejected many designs and went with a postal-themed drawing. Avery Dennison printed the Bugs Bunny stamp sheet, which featured "a special ten-stamp design and was the first self-adhesive souvenir sheet issued by the United States Postal Service."

=== 21st century ===
A younger version of Bugs is the main character of Baby Looney Tunes, which debuted on Kids' WB in 2001. In the action-comedy Loonatics Unleashed, his definite descendant Ace Bunny is the leader of the Loonatics team and seems to have inherited his ancestor's Brooklyn accent and rapier wit. In 2010, Deadline Hollywood announced that Warner Bros. was planning a live action/animated feature film starring Bugs, set to be written by David Berenbaum. Concept art was drawn by Stephen Silver in 2015. In 2023, Robert Rugan was hired to write the film.

Bugs as he appears in The Looney Tunes Show

In 2011, Bugs Bunny and the rest of the Looney Tunes gang returned to television in the Cartoon Network sitcom, The Looney Tunes Show. The characters feature new designs by artist Jessica Borutski. Among the changes to Bugs' appearance were the simplification and enlargement of his feet, as well as a change to his fur from gray to a shade of mauve (though in the second season, his fur was changed back to gray). In the series, Bugs and Daffy Duck are portrayed as best friends as opposed to their usual pairing as friendly rivals. At the same time, Bugs is more vocally exasperated by Daffy's antics in the series (sometimes to the point of anger), compared to his usual level-headed personality from the original cartoons. Bugs and Daffy maintain a close friendship with Porky Pig, though Bugs acts as a more reliable and supportive friend compared to Daffy's often self-serving behavior. The series also features a romantic storyline between Bugs and Lola Bunny, whose initial "crazy", overly talkative, and eccentric personality causes Bugs some frustration; however, he eventually accepts her quirks, demonstrating a tolerance similar to that which he shows toward Daffy. Unlike the original cartoons, Bugs lives in a regular home which he shares with Daffy, Taz (whom he treats as a pet dog) and Speedy Gonzales, in the middle of a dead-end street with their neighbors Yosemite Sam, Granny, and Witch Hazel.

In 2015, Bugs starred in the direct-to-video film Looney Tunes: Rabbits Run, and later returned to television yet again as the star of Cartoon Network and Boomerang's comedy series New Looney Tunes (formerly Wabbit).

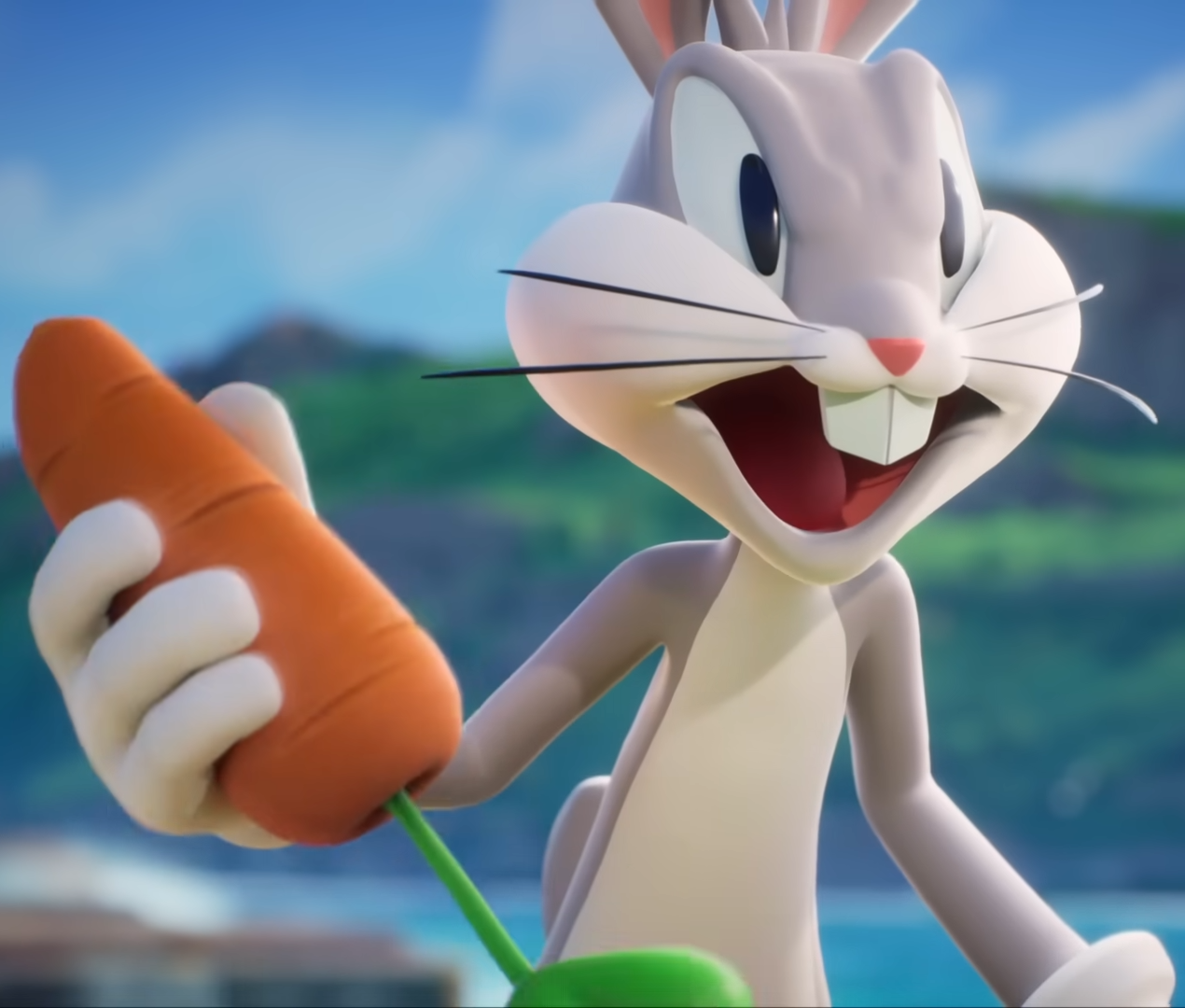
A 3D rendition of Bugs in the trailer of MultiVersus (2024)

In 2020, Bugs began appearing on the HBO Max streaming series Looney Tunes Cartoons. His design for this series primarily resembles his Bob Clampett days, complete with yellow gloves and his signature carrot. His personality is a combination of Freleng's trickery, Clampett's defiance, and Jones' resilience, while also maintaining his confident, insolent, smooth-talking demeanor. Bugs is voiced by Eric Bauza, who is also the current voice of Daffy Duck and Tweety, among others. In 2020, the United States Postal Service issued a new set of Bugs stamps. This was a part from a collection honoring the classic Looney Tunes characters. Bugs is presented there in a range of comical positions and facial expressions. Bugs made his return to movie theaters in the 2021 Space Jam sequel Space Jam: A New Legacy, this time starring NBA superstar LeBron James. In 2022, a new pre-school animated series titled Bugs Bunny Builders aired on HBO Max and Cartoonito. He is again voiced by Eric Bauza. Bugs has also appeared in numerous video games, including the Bugs Bunny's Crazy Castle series, The Bugs Bunny Birthday Blowout (1990), Bugs Bunny Rabbit Rampage (1994), Bugs Bunny in Double Trouble (1996), Looney Tunes B-Ball (1995), Bugs Bunny: Lost in Time (1999), Bugs Bunny & Taz: Time Busters, Looney Tunes Racing, Looney Tunes: Space Race (all 2000), Loons: The Fight for Fame (2002), Looney Tunes: Acme Arsenal (2007), Scooby Doo and Looney Tunes: Cartoon Universe, Looney Tunes Dash (2014), Looney Tunes World of Mayhem and MultiVersus (2024). In 2025, Bugs featured as a playable pilot in Bullet Hell game, Acecraft. In 2026, Bugs had a cameo as a whistleblower in the film Coyote vs. Acme.

== Personality and catchphrases ==
"Some people call me cocky and brash, but actually I am just self-assured. I'm nonchalant, imperturbable, contemplative. I play it cool, but I can get hot under the collar. And above all I'm a very 'aware' character. I'm well aware that I am appearing in an animated cartoon....And sometimes I chomp on my carrot for the same reason that a stand-up comic chomps on his cigar. It saves me from rushing from the last joke to the next one too fast. And I sometimes don't act, I react. And I always treat the contest with my pursuers as 'fun and games.' When momentarily I appear to be cornered or in dire danger and I scream, don't be consoined – it's actually a big put-on. Let's face it, Doc. I've read the script and I already know how it turns out."

— Bob Clampett on Bugs Bunny, written in first person.

Bugs Bunny's fast-talking speech pattern was inspired to a degree by the character of Oscar Shapely in the romantic comedy film It Happened One Night (1934). In the film, Shapely addresses Clark Gable's character Peter Warne as "Doc", and Warne mentions an imaginary person named "Bugs Dooley" to frighten Shapely. Referring to the same film, Friz Freleng, Chuck Jones and Bob Clampett all claimed that Bugs' nonchalant carrot-chewing style came from a scene where Gable's character eats a carrot while talking.

"'What's up Doc?' is a very simple thing. It's only funny because it's in a situation. It was an all Bugs Bunny line. It wasn't funny. If you put it in human terms; you come home late one night from work, you walk up to the gate in the yard, you walk through the gate and up into the front room, the door is partly open and there's some guy shooting under your living room. So what do you do? You run if you have any sense, the least you can do is call the cops. But what if you come up and tap him on the shoulder and look over and say 'What's up Doc?' You're interested in what he's doing. That's ridiculous. That's not what you say at a time like that. So that's why it's funny, I think. In other words it's asking a perfectly legitimate question in a perfectly illogical situation."

— Chuck Jones on Bugs Bunny's catchphrase "What's up Doc?"

The carrot-chewing scenes are generally followed by Bugs' most well-known catchphrase, "What's up, Doc?", which was written by director Tex Avery for his first Bugs Bunny short film, A Wild Hare (1940). Avery explained later that it was a common expression in his native Texas and that he did not think much of the phrase. Back then "doc" meant the same as "dude" does today. When the cartoon was first screened in theaters, the "What's up, Doc?" scene generated a tremendously positive audience reaction.

Another catchphrase associated with the character's tendency to play the trickster is "Ain't I a stinker", an acknowledgement that he engages in unfair tactics. It was first used as early as the 1940s in shorts like the 1942 The Wacky Wabbit. This was notably exhibited in the 1953 short, Duck Amuck, in which Daffy Duck endures various humiliations at the hands of the unseen cartoonist, who in the end is revealed to be Bugs Bunny, who then says this line.

== Voice actors ==
The following are the various vocal artists who have voiced Bugs Bunny over the last 85-plus years for both Warner Bros. official productions and others:

=== Mel Blanc ===
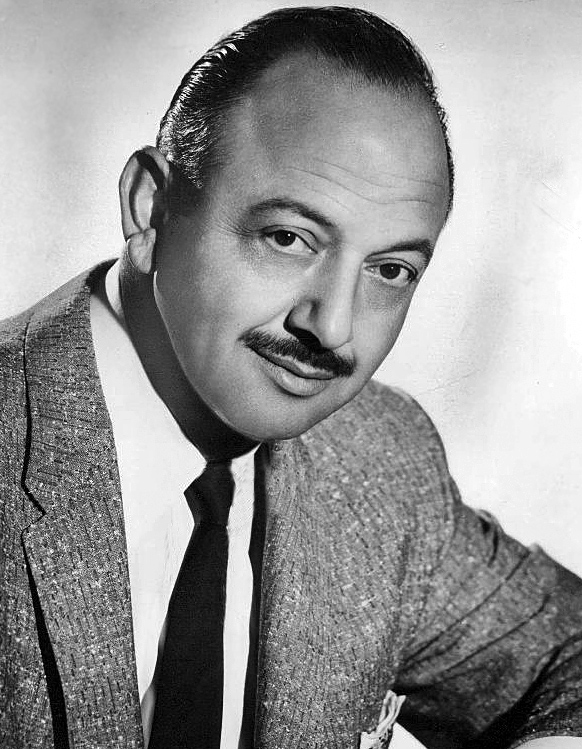
Mel Blanc was the original voice of Bugs and voiced the character for nearly five decades.

Mel Blanc voiced the character for 52 years, from Bugs' debut in the 1938 short Porky's Hare Hunt until Blanc's death in 1989. Blanc described the voice he created for Bugs in 1940's A Wild Hare as a combination of Bronx and Brooklyn accents; however, Tex Avery claimed that he asked Blanc to give the character not a New York accent per se, but a voice like that of actor Frank McHugh, who frequently appeared in supporting roles in the 1930s and whose voice might be described as New York Irish. In Bugs' following cartoon, Elmer's Pet Rabbit, Blanc created a completely new voice for Bugs, which sounded like a Jimmy Stewart impression, but the directors decided the previous Wild Hare voice was better. Though Blanc's best known character was the carrot-chomping rabbit, munching on the carrots interrupted the dialogue. Various substitutes, such as celery, were tried, but none of them sounded like a carrot. So, for the sake of expedience, Blanc munched and then spit the carrot bits into a spittoon, rather than swallowing them, and continued with the dialogue. One often-repeated story, which dates back to the 1940s, is that Blanc was allergic to carrots and had to spit them out to minimize any allergic reaction, but his autobiography makes no such claim. In fact, in a 1984 interview with Tim Lawson, co-author of The Magic Behind the Voices: A Who's Who of Voice Actors, Blanc emphatically denied being allergic to carrots.

=== Others ===
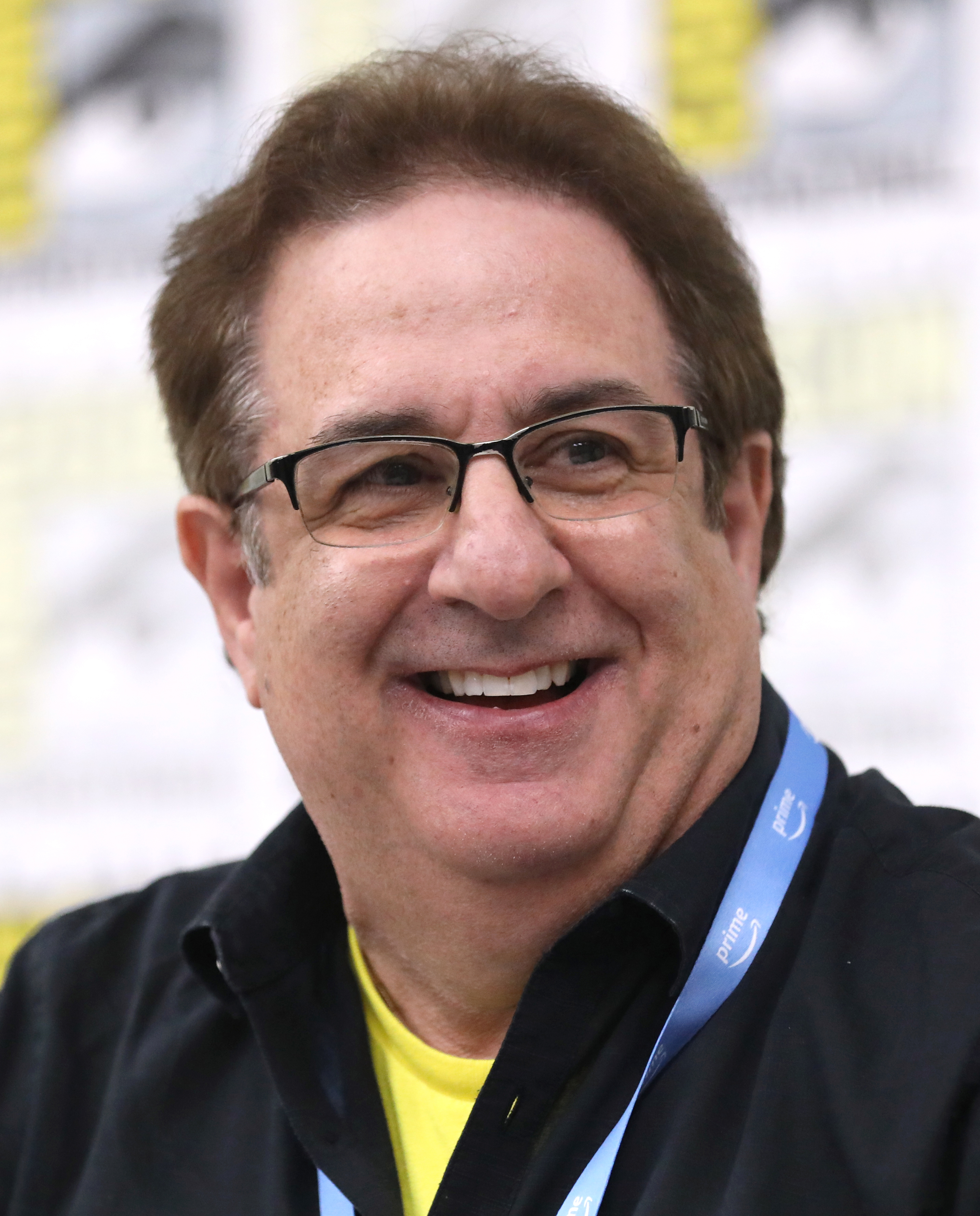
Jeff Bergman has primarily voiced Bugs since Blanc's death in 1989.

Eric Bauza was the most recent voice for Bugs until his death in 2026.

- Ben Hardaway (as an early iteration of Bugs; one line in Porky's Hare Hunt)
- Bob Clampett (vocal effects and additional lines in A Corny Concerto and Falling Hare)
- Gilbert Mack (Golden Records records, Bugs Bunny Songfest)
- Dave Barry (Golden Records records, Bugs Bunny Easter Song and Mr. Easter Rabbit, Bugs Bunny Songfest)
- Daws Butler (imitating Groucho Marx and Ed Norton in Wideo Wabbit)
- Ricky Nelson (singing "Gee Whiz, Whilikins, Golly Gee" in an episode of The Bugs Bunny Show)
- Jerry Hausner (additional lines in Devil's Feud Cake, The Bugs Bunny Show and some commercials)
- Larry Storch (ABC Saturday Mornings promotion)
- Mike Sammes (Bugs Bunny Comes to London)
- Noel Blanc (radio shows, commercials, The Looney Tunes Revue, one line in Rabbit-cadabbra, ABC Family Fun Fair, You Rang? answering machine messages, vocal effects in Bugs Bunny's Birthday Ball, 2001 Chevrolet Monte Carlo 400)
- Peter Leeds ("Day-O (The Banana Boat Song)" in Blue Peter)
- Unknown (Bugs Bunny Exercise and Adventure Album)
- Gilbert Grilli (1984 "I'm Glad That I'm Bugs Bunny" and "What's Up Doc?" covers)
- Bob Bergen (ABC Family Fun Fair)
- Darrell Hammond ("Wappin'")
- Jeff Bergman (62nd Academy Awards, Cartoon All-Stars to the Rescue, The Earth Day Special, Gremlins 2: The New Batch, Tiny Toon Adventures, Box Office Bunny, Bugs Bunny's Overtures to Disaster, (Blooper) Bunny, Bugs Bunny's Lunar Tunes, Invasion of the Bunny Snatchers, Bugs Bunny's Creature Features, Special Delivery Symphony, Pride of the Martians, The Looney Tunes Show, Scooby Doo & Looney Tunes Cartoon Universe: Adventure, Looney Tunes Dash, Looney Tunes: Rabbits Run, Wun Wabbit Wun, New Looney Tunes, Daffy Duck Dance Off, Ani-Mayhem, Meet Bugs (and Daffy), Space Jam: A New Legacy, Tiny Toons Looniversity, Daffy Season, various commercials)
- Keith Scott (Bugs Bunny's 50th Anniversary bumper, Bugs Bunny demonstration animatronic, Looney Tunes Musical Revue, The Christmas Looney Tunes Classic Collection, Spectacular Light and Sound Show Illuminanza, Looney Tunes: We Got the Beat!, Looney Tunes: What's Up Rock?!, Looney Tunes on Ice, Looney Tunes LIVE! Classroom Capers, Christmas Moments with Looney Tunes, The Looney Tunes Radio Show, Looney Rock, Looney Tunes Christmas Carols, 2023 Australian Open, various commercials)
- Greg Burson (1990 Macy's Thanksgiving Day Parade, speaking in Bugs Bunny's Birthday Ball, Tiny Toon Adventures, Looney Tunes River Ride, Yakety Yak, Take It Back, Mrs. Bush's Story Time, Yosemite Sam and the Gold River Adventure!, The Toonite Show Starring Bugs Bunny, Taz-Mania, Bugs Bunny: Rabbit Rampage, Animaniacs, The Bugs Bunny Wacky World Games, Acme Animation Factory, Have Yourself a Looney Tunes Christmas, Looney Tunes B-Ball, 67th Academy Awards, Carrotblanca, Bugs 'n' Daffy intro, From Hare to Eternity, Warner Bros. Kids Club, Bugs Bunny's Learning Adventures, Looney Tunes: What's Up Rock?!, various commercials)
- John Blackman (Hey Hey It's Saturday)
- Russell Calabrese (vocal effects in (Blooper) Bunny and Invasion of the Bunny Snatchers)
- John Willyard (1992 Six Flags Great Adventure commercial)
- Marcus Deon Thomas ("Dynamite")
- Mendi Segal (Bugs & Friends Sing the Beatles, The Looney West)
- Billy West (Space Jam, Bugs & Friends Sing Elvis, Histeria!, Warner Bros. Sing-Along: Quest for Camelot, Warner Bros. Sing-Along: Looney Tunes, The Looney Tunes Rockin' Road Show, Crash! Bang! Boom! The Best of WB Sound FX, The Looney Tunes Kwazy Christmas screaming in Looney Tunes: Back in Action, Bah, Humduck! A Looney Tunes Christmas, A Looney Tunes Sing-A-Long Christmas, various video games, webtoons, and commercials)
- Joe Alaskey (Chasers Anonymous, Gatorade commercial, Tweety's High-Flying Adventure, Looney Tunes: Back in Action (film and video game), Hare and Loathing in Las Vegas, Looney Tunes webtoons, Daffy Duck for President, Aflac commercial, Looney Tunes: Acme Arsenal, Justice League: The New Frontier, Looney Tunes: Cartoon Conductor, Looney Tunes: Laff Riot pilot, Looney Tunes Dance Off, TomTom Looney Tunes GPS, Looney Tunes ClickN READ Phonics)
- Marc Silk (Cartoon Network bumpers)
- Samuel Vincent (Baby Looney Tunes, Baby Looney Tunes' Eggs-traordinary Adventure)
- Eric Goldberg (Looney Tunes: Back in Action (additional lines), Looney Tunes: Back in Action interview)
- Bill Farmer (Robot Chicken)
- Scott Innes (AT&T commercial)
- Kevin Shinick (Mad)
- Gary Martin (Looney Tunes All-Stars promotions, Looney Tunes Take-Over Weekend promotion, Looney Tunes Marathon promotion)
- Todd Michael Thornton (Rapid T. Rabbit and Friends)
- Eric Bauza (Looney Tunes World of Mayhem, Looney Tunes Cartoons, Bugs Bunny in The Golden Carrot, Space Jam: A New Legacy (as Big Chungus), Space Jam: A New Legacy live show, Bugs and Daffy's Thanksgiving Road Trip, MultiVersus, Bugs Bunny Builders, ACME Fools, Lights, Camera, Action: A WB100th Anniversary Celebration, Teen Titans Go!, Looney Tunes pinball machine, Looney Tunes: Wacky World of Sports, Warner Bros. Studio Tour Hollywood commercial, Coyote vs. Acme)

=== Parodies ===
A list of voice actors of Bugs Bunny for parodies not produced by Warner Bros.

- Robert Smigel (Saturday Night Live Season 28, Ep. 14)
- Seth MacFarlane (Stewie Griffin: The Untold Story, Family Guy)
- James Arnold Taylor (Drawn Together)

== Comics ==
=== Comic books ===
Bugs Bunny was continuously featured in comic books for more than 40 years, from 1941 to 1983, and has appeared sporadically since then. Bugs first appeared in comic books in 1941, in Looney Tunes and Merrie Melodies Comics #1, published by Dell Comics. Bugs was a recurring star in that book all through its 153-issue run, which lasted until July 1954. Western Publishing (under its Dell and Gold Key imprints) published 245 issues of a Bugs Bunny comic book from Dec. 1952/Jan. 1953 to April 1984. The company also published 81 issues of the joint title Yosemite Sam and Bugs Bunny from December 1970 to 1983. During the 1950s, Dell also published a number of Bugs Bunny spinoff titles.

Creators on those series included Chase Craig, Helen Houghton, Eleanor Packer, Lloyd Turner, Michael Maltese, John Liggera, Tony Strobl, Veve Risto, Cecil Beard, Pete Alvorado, Carl Fallberg, Cal Howard, Vic Lockman, Lynn Karp, Pete Llanuza, Pete Hansen, Jack Carey, Del Connell, Kellog Adams, Jack Manning, Mark Evanier, Tom McKimson, Joe Messerli, Carlos Garzon, Donald F. Glut, Sealtiel Alatriste, Sandro Costa, and Massimo Fechi.

The German publisher Condor published a 76-issues Bugs Bunny series (translated and reprinted from the American comics) in the mid-1970s. The Danish publisher Egmont Ehapa produced a weekly reprint series in the mid-1990s.

=== Comic strip ===
The Bugs Bunny comic strip ran for almost 50 years, from January 10, 1943, to December 30, 1990, syndicated by the Newspaper Enterprise Association. It started out as a Sunday page and added a daily strip on November 1, 1948.

The strip originated with Chase Craig, who did the first five weeks before leaving for military service in World War II. Roger Armstrong illustrated the strip from 1942 to 1944. The creators most associated with the strip are writers Albert Stoffel (1947–1979) & Carl Fallberg (1950–1969), and artist Ralph Heimdahl, who worked on it from 1947 to 1979. Other creators associated with the Bugs Bunny strip include Jack Hamm, Carl Buettner, Phil Evans, Carl Barks (1952), Tom McKimson, Arnold Drake, Frank Hill, Brett Koth, and Shawn Keller.

== Reception and legacy ==
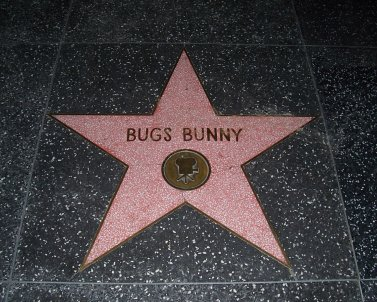
Bugs' star on the Hollywood Walk of Fame

Like Mickey Mouse for Disney, Bugs Bunny has served as the mascot for Warner Bros. Entertainment and its various divisions. According to Guinness World Records, Bugs has appeared in more films (both short and feature-length) than any other cartoon character, and is the ninth most portrayed film personality in the world. On December 10, 1985, Bugs became the second cartoon character (after Mickey) to receive a star on the Hollywood Walk of Fame.

He also has been a pitchman for companies including Kool-Aid and Nike. His Nike commercials with Michael Jordan as "Hare Jordan" for the Air Jordan VII and VIII became precursors to Space Jam. As a result, he has spent time as an honorary member of Jordan Brand, including having Jordan's Jumpman logo done in his image. In 2015, as part of the 30th anniversary of Jordan Brand, Nike released a mid-top Bugs Bunny version of the Air Jordan I, named the "Air Jordan Mid 1 Hare", along with a women's equivalent inspired by Lola Bunny called the "Air Jordan Mid 1 Lola", along with a commercial featuring Bugs and Ahmad Rashad.

In 2002, TV Guide compiled a list of the 50 greatest cartoon characters of all time as part of the magazine's 50th anniversary. Bugs Bunny was given the honor of number 1. In a CNN broadcast on July 31, 2002, a TV Guide editor talked about the group that created the list. The editor also explained why Bugs pulled top billing: "His stock...has never gone down...Bugs is the best example...of the smart-aleck American comic. He not only is a great cartoon character, he's a great comedian. He was written well. He was drawn beautifully. He has thrilled and made many generations laugh. He is tops." Some have noted that comedian Eric Andre is the nearest contemporary comedic equivalent to Bugs. They attribute this to, "their ability to constantly flip the script on their unwitting counterparts."

== Copyright status ==
Under current US copyright law, Bugs Bunny is due to enter the US public domain in between 2033 and 2035. (Note: See USC Title 17, Chapter 3, § 304(b)) However, this will only apply (at first) to the character's depiction as Happy Rabbit in Porky's Hare Hunt which was published in 1938 (which will enter the US public domain in 2034). The debut of his later persona in 1940 will enter the US public domain in 2036. Although some of his pre-1948 cartoons had been in US public domain since the early 1970s, other versions of him with later developments may persist under copyright until the entry of his post-1948 cartoons in the public domain.

== Notable films ==
- Porky's Hare Hunt (1938) – debut
- A Wild Hare (1940) – "official" debut, Oscar nominee
- Hiawatha's Rabbit Hunt (1941) – Oscar nominee
- What's Opera, Doc? (1957) – voted #1 of the 50 Greatest Cartoons of all time and inducted into the National Film Registry
- Knighty Knight Bugs (1958) – Oscar winner
- False Hare (1964) – final regular cartoon
- Who Framed Roger Rabbit (1988) – first, and so far only, time Bugs appeared with Disney's mascot, Mickey Mouse – Oscar winner
- Box-Office Bunny (1990) – first theatrically released short since 1964
- Space Jam (1996) – appeared alongside NBA superstar, Michael Jordan
- Looney Tunes: Back in Action (2003) – appeared alongside Brendan Fraser, Jenna Elfman and Steve Martin
- Space Jam: A New Legacy (2021) – appeared alongside NBA superstar, LeBron James

== Language ==
The American use of nimrod to mean "idiot" is often said to have originated from Bugs's exclamation "What a nimrod!" to describe the inept hunter Elmer Fudd. However, it is Daffy Duck who refers to Fudd as "my little nimrod" in the 1948 short What Makes Daffy Duck, and the Oxford English Dictionary records earlier negative uses of the term "nimrod".

== See also ==
- Looney Tunes
- Merrie Melodies
- Golden age of American animation

== Bibliography ==
- Adamson, Joe (1990). Bugs Bunny: 50 Years and Only One Grey Hare. New York: Henry Holt. ISBN 0-8050-1855-7.
- Beck, Jerry; Friedwald, Will (1989). Looney Tunes and Merrie Melodies. New York: Henry Holt. ISBN 0-8050-0894-2.
- Jones, Chuck (1989). Chuck Amuck: The Life and Times of an Animated Cartoonist. New York: Farrar, Straus and Giroux. ISBN 0-374-12348-9.
- Blanc, Mel; Bashe, Philip (1988). That's Not All, Folks!. Clayton South, VIC, Australia: Warner Books. ISBN 0-446-39089-5.
- Maltin, Leonard (1987). Of Mice and Magic: A History of American Animated Cartoons (Revised ed.). New York: Plume Book. ISBN 0-452-25993-2.
- Barrier, Michael (2003). "Warner Bros., 1933-1940". Hollywood Cartoons : American Animation in Its Golden Age: American Animation in Its Golden Age. Oxford University Press. ISBN 9780198020790.
- Rubin, Rachel (2000). "A Gang of Little Yids". Jewish Gangsters of Modern Literature. University of Illinois Press. ISBN 9780252025396.
- Sandler, Kevin S. (2001), "The Wabbit We-negatiotes: Looney Tunes in a Conglomerate Age", in Pomerance, Murray (ed.), Ladies and Gentlemen, Boys and Girls: Gender in Film at the End of the Twentieth Century, State University of New York Press, ISBN 9780791448854
- Sergi, Joe (2015). The Law for Comic Book Creators: Essential Concepts and Applications. Jefferson, North Carolina: McFarland & Company. ISBN 978-1-4766-1733-6. OCLC 903489229.
- Walz, Gene (1998), "Charlie Thorson and the Temporary Disneyfication of Warner Bros. Cartoons", in Sandler, Kevin S. (ed.), Reading the Rabbit: Explorations in Warner Bros. Animation, Rutgers University Press, ISBN 9780813525389
