= From Hare to Eternity =

- Serigraph
- Directed by: Chuck Jones
- Story by: Stephen Fossati
- Produced by: Chuck Jones; Linda Jones Clough
- Starring: Frank Gorshin; Greg Burson
- Music by: Cameron Patrick; George Daugherty
- Animation by: Tom Decker; Claude Raynes; Patrick Gleeson
- Backgrounds by: Jill Petrilak
- Color process: Technicolor
- Production companies: Warner Bros. Family Entertainment; Warner Bros. Animation; Chuck Jones Film Productions
- Distributed by: Warner Bros. Pictures
- Release date: November 4, 1997
- Running time: 7:10
- Language: English

From Hare to Eternity is a Looney Tunes cartoon directed by Chuck Jones released on November 4, 1997.

== Plot ==
Yosemite Sam is the captain and only occupant of a sailing ship, H.M.S. Friz Freleng with home port in Kansas City (an on-screen reference to the late animator and his hometown), and he is heading on a voyage for buried treasure with the means to get it for himself. He reaches the island, immediately finding the dig site, and uncovers both a treasure chest and Bugs Bunny on it.

Before Sam can deal with Bugs, the rabbit shoves the chest and Sam onto the ship and sets the ship in motion. Bugs avoids walking the plank and tricks Sam into thinking he is a charming mermaid, which gets him into a swimming chase with a shark. In the end, Bugs Bunny opens his treasure chest, which is revealed to be full of carrots.

== Production notes ==
From Hare to Eternity is a parody of H.M.S. Pinafore with Yosemite Sam and Bugs Bunny performing several songs. It was issued as a tribute to Friz Freleng, who had died two years earlier. It is the final Chuck Jones-directed Looney Tunes short, before his retirement that same year.

According to animator Warren O'Neill, Eric Goldberg animated the "Buttercup Pie" sequence where Bugs tricks Sam while disguised as a mermaid.

== Voice cast ==
- Frank Gorshin as Yosemite Sam
- Greg Burson as Bugs Bunny
- Jeff McCarthy as Michigan J. Frog

== Home media ==
- VHS – From Hare to Eternity
- DVD –
  - The Looney Looney Looney Bugs Bunny Movie (Special feature)
  - Looney Tunes: Parodies Collection
- Blu-ray –
  - Looney Tunes Platinum Collection: Volume 1, Disc 3 (1998 dubbed version)
  - Joe's Apartment (Special feature)

== See also ==
- List of Bugs Bunny cartoons
- List of Yosemite Sam cartoons
