= Yakety Yak, Take It Back =

Yakety Yak, Take it Back
- Directed by: Michael Patterson; Tim Newman
- Written by: Jerry Leiber, Mike Stoller, new lyrics by Leiber
- Produced by: Tim Newman
- Starring: Ozzy Osbourne; Bette Midler; Randy Newman; Queen Latifah; Stevie Wonder; Tone Lōc; Pat Benatar; Greg Burson; B. B. King; Kenny Loggins
- Distributed by: Time Warner
- Release date: 1991
- Running time: 50 minutes
- Language: English

Yakety Yak, Take it Back is a 1991 celebrity charity music video film aimed at encouraging recycling using a combination of live action rock stars, rappers, and animated Warner Bros. characters. The film features Pat Benatar, Natalie Cole, Charlie Daniels, Lita Ford, Quincy Jones, B. B. King, Queen Latifah, Kenny Loggins, Jerry Leiber and Mike Stoller, Bette Midler, Randy Newman, Tone Lōc, Ozzy Osbourne, Brenda Russell, Al B. Sure!, Ricky Van Shelton, Barry White, and Stevie Wonder, along with Melba Moore as herself and the voice of Tibi the Take it Back Butterfly, Dr. John as himself and the voice of Yakety Yak, Greg Burson as the voice of Bugs Bunny, Derrick Stevens as the voice of MC Skat Kat, and Squeak as the voice of Fatz.

The song is a drastically rearranged version of the 1950s-era rock and roll song "Yakety Yak" by Jerry Leiber and Mike Stoller, with new lyrics by Leiber.

The film originally aired on MTV in a shortened music video form and was released in an extended version on home video. It was also shown on Episode 3043 of Sesame Street.
