= Daffy Duck =

Warner Bros. theatrical cartoon character

- Looney Tunes/Merrie Melodies character
- First appearance: Porky's Duck Hunt (April 17, 1937; 89 years ago)
- Created by: Tex Avery; Bob Clampett
- Voiced by: Mel Blanc (1937–1989); Jeff Bergman (1989–1993, 1997, 2002–2004, 2007, 2011–present); Joe Alaskey (1990–2011, 2014); Greg Burson (1991–1995, 1997–1998, 2003); Maurice LaMarche (1991); Frank Gorshin (1996); Dee Bradley Baker (1996, 2008, 2016–2020); Billy West (1998); Jeff Bennett (1999, 2003–2004, 2006); Sam Vincent (Baby Looney Tunes; 2002–2006); Eric Bauza (2018–2026) (see below)
- Developed by: Bob Clampett; Chuck Jones; Robert McKimson; Friz Freleng; Frank Tashlin; Arthur Davis

In-universe information
- Alias: Duck Dodgers
- Species: American black duck
- Gender: Male
- Family: Billy (cousin); Danger Duck (descendant)
- Significant others: Melissa Duck; Tina Russo (The Looney Tunes Show)
- Nationality: American

Daffy Duck is a cartoon character created by animators Tex Avery and Bob Clampett for Leon Schlesinger Productions. Styled as an anthropomorphic black duck, he was created for the Warners' cartoon series Looney Tunes and Merrie Melodies, in which he is usually depicted as a screwball or foil for either Bugs Bunny, Porky Pig, or Speedy Gonzales. He was one of the first of the new "screwball" characters that emerged in the late 1930s to replace traditional everyman characters who were more popular earlier in the decade, such as Mickey Mouse and Porky Pig.

In The Scarlet Pumpernickel (1950), Daffy has a middle name, Dumas as the writer of a swashbuckling script, a nod to Alexandre Dumas. Also, in the Baby Looney Tunes episode "The Tattletale", Granny addresses Daffy as "Daffy Horatio Tiberius Duck". In The Looney Tunes Show (2011), the joke middle names "Armando" and "Sheldon" are used.

Daffy starred in 130 shorts in the golden age, making him the third-most frequent character in the Looney Tunes/Merrie Melodies cartoons, behind Bugs Bunny's 168 appearances and Porky Pig's 153 appearances. Virtually every Warner Bros. cartoon director, most notably Bob Clampett, Robert McKimson, and Chuck Jones, put his own spin on Daffy.

He was ranked number 14 on TV Guide's list of top 50 greatest cartoon characters.

== History ==
=== Golden age appearances ===
==== Origin (1937–1940) ====
Daffy says his first line and spins away for the first time in Porky's Duck Hunt (1937)

Daffy first appeared in Porky's Duck Hunt, released on April 17, 1937. The cartoon was directed by Tex Avery who, as a lifelong duck hunter, based the cartoon on his hunting experiences at White Rock Lake in Dallas. The lead animator on the cartoon was Bob Clampett who was equally responsible for Daffy's creation. As Clampett recalled in a 1970 interview with Milton Gray and Michael Barrier:

Tex came up with the idea of Porky going on a duck hunt, wherein the hunter would try to get the ducks but they would always turn the tables on him. We thought of a ream of gags — they happened to come easy — and we had all these crazy ducks. After we boiled it down, we had two or three times as many gags as we needed. I asked Tex, "What if instead of all these ducks being crazy, you consolidated most of them into one comic relief character?" Tex did that, and when he did, he created Daffy Duck... Tex gave me the first scene of Daffy to animate. In this scene, Porky confronts Daffy, who in trying to explain he's harmless says, "I'm just a crazy darn fool duck" and then was to swim off across the water. Tex told me, "Make him exit funny." I asked, "Can I do anything I want?" And he said "Yes—anything." So I had Daffy cross his eyes, do a Stan Laurel jump, and then do cartwheels, and do a ballet pirouette, and bounce on his head, and so forth.

After reviewing a pencil test version of Clampett's scene, Avery thought it was hilarious, but needed some vocal effects, so a series of "Woo-Woos" were later dubbed in post-production. Daffy's "Woo-Woos" were inspired by similar noises made by Warner Bros. live-action comedian Hugh Herbert. Avery also ordered Clampett to repeat this action several times throughout the film –including over the ending "That's all folks!" title card.

This early appearance of a yet unnamed Daffy is less anthropomorphic and resembles a normal black duck. In fact, the only aspects of the character that have remained consistent through the years are his voice characterization by Mel Blanc and his black feathers with a white neck ring. Blanc's characterization of Daffy once held the world record for the longest characterization of one animated character by their original actor: 52 years.

According to Clampett, when Porky's Duck Hunt appeared in theaters the audience responded enthusiastically. As he recalled: "At that time, audiences weren't accustomed to seeing a cartoon character do these things. And so, when it hit the theaters it was an explosion. People would leave the theaters talking about this daffy duck."

In his second appearance, Daffy Duck & Egghead (again directed by Avery, released on January 1, 1938) the duck character was officially given a name of "Daffy". Clampett recalled that the "Termite Terrace" team originally wanted to call the character "Dizzy Duck" after baseball player Dizzy Dean, but their producer Leon Schlesinger objected to it, saying: "No, you can't call him Dizzy – it sounds as if he's going to faint." The team named him "Daffy Duck" after Dizzy's brother Daffy Dean instead.

The origin of Daffy's voice, with its lateral lisp, is a matter of some dispute. One often-repeated "official" story is that it was modeled after producer Leon Schlesinger's tendency to lisp. However, in Mel Blanc's autobiography, That's Not All Folks!, he contradicts that conventional belief, writing, "It seemed to me that such an extended mandible would hinder his speech, particularly on words containing an s sound. Thus 'despicable' became 'desth-picable.'" Daffy's slobbery, exaggerated lisp was developed over time, and it is barely noticeable in the early cartoons.

==== World War II Daffy, 1941–1945 ====
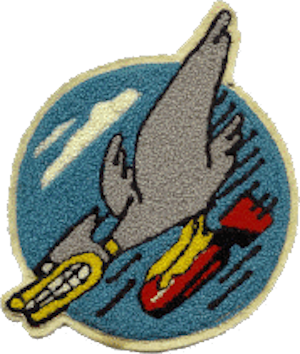
600 Bomb Squadron emblem Daffy Duck

Daffy would feature in several war-themed shorts during World War II, remaining true to his unbridled nature. He battles a Nazi goat intent on eating Daffy's scrap metal in Scrap Happy Daffy (1943), hits Adolf Hitler's head with a giant mallet in Daffy the Commando (1943) and outwits Hitler, Goebbels and Goering in Plane Daffy (1944). Oddly enough, it was only after these wartime escapades that Daffy is actually subject to conscription into military service, in the form of "the little man from the draft board", whom he tries to dodge in Draftee Daffy (1945).

==== Evolving "Earlier" Daffy, 1946–1950 ====
For Daffy Doodles (his first Looney Tunes cartoon as a director), Robert McKimson tamed Daffy a bit, redesigning him yet again to be rounder and less elastic. The studio also instilled some of Bugs Bunny's savvy into the duck, making him as brilliant with his mouth as he was with his battiness. Daffy was teamed up with Porky Pig; the duck's one-time rival became his straight man. Arthur Davis, who directed Warner Bros. cartoon shorts for a few years in the late 1940s until upper management decreed there should be only three units (McKimson, Friz Freleng, and Jones), presented a Daffy similar to McKimson's. McKimson is noted as the last of the three units to make his Daffy uniform with Jones's, with even late shorts, such as Don't Axe Me (1958), featuring traits of the "screwball" Daffy. Starting in You Were Never Duckier, Daffy's personality evolved to be less loony and more greedy.

==== Experimenting with Daffy, 1951–1964 ====
While Daffy's loony days were over, McKimson continued to make him as bad or good as his various roles required him to be. McKimson would often have Daffy play the role of a salesman who pushes a potential customer into buying something, such as Fool Coverage (1952) where Daffy succeeds in selling Porky Pig a $1,000,000 accident policy which only works under impossible conditions (which, unfortunately for Daffy, all occur), and The High and the Flighty (1956) where Daffy intervenes in Foghorn Leghorn and the Barnyard Dawg's usual antics by selling them novelty joke items to get back at each other. His marks eventually catch on and team up against Daffy to trap him in one of the prank kits he sold to them. McKimson would use this version of Daffy from 1946 to 1961. However, even McKimson would follow in Jones' footsteps in many aspects with cartoons like People Are Bunny (1959) and Ducking the Devil (1957). Friz Freleng's version took a hint from Chuck Jones by making the duck more sympathetic, as in Show Biz Bugs (1957). Here, Daffy is overemotional and jealous of Bugs, yet he has real talent that is ignored by the theater manager and the crowd. This cartoon finishes with a sequence in which Daffy attempts to wow the Bugs-besotted audience with an act in which he drinks gasoline and swallows nitroglycerine, gunpowder, and uranium-238 (in a greenish solution), jumps up and down to "shake well" and finally swallows a lit match that detonates the whole improbable mixture. When Bugs tells Daffy that the audience loves the act and wants more, Daffy, now a ghost floating upward (presumably to Heaven), says that he can only do the act once. Some TV stations, and in the 1990s the cable network TNT, edited out the dangerous act, afraid of imitation by young children.

==== Pairing of Daffy and Porky in parodies of popular movies, 1951–1965 ====
While Bugs Bunny became Warner Bros.' most popular character, the directors still found ample use for Daffy. Several cartoons place him in parodies of popular movies and radio serials; Porky Pig was usually a comic relief sidekick. For example, Daffy in The Great Piggy Bank Robbery (1946) as "Duck Twacy" (Dick Tracy) by Bob Clampett; in The Scarlet Pumpernickel (1950), Daffy was the hero and Porky Pig was the villain. Drip-Along Daffy (1951), named after the Hopalong Cassidy character, throws Daffy into a Western with him labeled "Western-Type Hero" and Porky Pig labeled "Comedy Relief". In Duck Dodgers in the 24½th Century (1953), a parody of Buck Rogers, Daffy trades barbs (and bullets) with Marvin the Martian, with Porky Pig retaining the role of Daffy's sidekick. In Rocket Squad (1956), a parody of Dragnet and Racket Squad, Daffy and Porky Pig pair up once again. Daffy also played Stupor Duck, a parody of the Adventures of Superman television series. Robin Hood Daffy (1958) casts the duck in the role of the legendary outlaw Robin Hood with Porky Pig as Friar Tuck. China Jones (1959) named after China Smith, has Daffy in Hong Kong playing the role of a private investigator.

==== Pairing of Bugs and Daffy, 1951–1964 ====
Bugs's ascension to stardom also prompted the Warner Bros. animators to recast Daffy as the rabbit's rival, intensely jealous, insecure and determined to steal back the spotlight, while Bugs either remained cool headed but mildly amused and/or indifferent to the duck's jealousy, sometimes using it to his advantage. Daffy's desire to achieve stardom at almost any cost was explored as early as 1940 in Freleng's You Ought to Be in Pictures, but the idea was most successfully used by Chuck Jones, who redesigned the duck once again, making him scrawnier and scruffier. In Jones' "Hunting Trilogy" (or "Duck Season/Rabbit Season Trilogy") of Rabbit Fire, Rabbit Seasoning and Duck! Rabbit, Duck! (each respectively launched in 1951, 1952, and 1953), a running gag involves Daffy's attention-grabbing ways and excitability providing Bugs Bunny the perfect opportunity to fool the hapless Elmer Fudd into repeatedly shooting Daffy's bill; Daffy's bill is shown to be invulnerable towards bullets, unlike Bugs who has had his ears grazed by Elmer's shots and barely avoiding injury. Daffy sees it as humiliation in part of Bugs due to his inflated ego. It is thought that Chuck Jones based Daffy Duck's new personality on his fellow animator Bob Clampett, who, like Daffy, was known as a loud self-promoter. In Beanstalk Bunny Daffy, Bugs and Elmer are once again teamed up in a parody of Jack and the Beanstalk (with Elmer as the giant); in A Star Is Bored Daffy tries to upstage Bugs Bunny. In the spoofs of the TV shows The Millionaire and This Is Your Life, Daffy tries to defeat his arch-rival Bugs Bunny for a $1,000,000.00 prize given out by his favorite TV show in The Million Hare and in This Is a Life?, Daffy tries to upstage Bugs Bunny in order to be the guest of honor on the show; in all four of these cartoons Daffy ends up a loser because of his own overemotional personality (which impairs Daffy's common sense and reasoning ability) and his craving for attention. By Daffy's own admission he is extremely greedy: "I can't help it, I'm a greedy slob. It's my hobby!" Ali Baba Bunny (1957) and "I may be a coward, but I'm a greedy little coward" Ducking the Devil (1957).

==== Solo Daffy ====
Film critic Steve Schneider calls Jones' version of Daffy "a kind of unleashed id." Jones said that his version of the character "expresses all of the things we're afraid to express." This is evident in Jones' Duck Amuck (1953), "one of the few unarguable masterpieces of American animation" according to Schneider. In the episode, Daffy is plagued by a godlike animator whose malicious paintbrush alters the setting, soundtrack, and even Daffy. When Daffy demands to know who is responsible for the changes, the camera pulls back to reveal none other than Bugs Bunny. Duck Amuck is widely heralded as a classic of filmmaking for its illustration that a character's personality can be recognized independently of appearance, setting, voice, and plot. In 1999, the short was selected for preservation in the United States National Film Registry.

==== Daffy's pairing with Speedy, 1965–1968 ====
When the Warner Bros. animation studio briefly outsourced cartoon production to DePatie–Freleng Enterprises (DFE) in the 1960s, Daffy Duck became an antagonist in several cartoons opposite Speedy Gonzales, who refers to Daffy as "the loco duck." According to Robert McKimson, he was forbidden from using Bugs Bunny, with the disharmonious pairing of Daffy and Speedy being mandated by executives. In many of the later DFE cartoons, such as Feather Finger and Daffy's Diner, Daffy is portrayed as a more sympathetic character (often forced to turn against Speedy at the behest of a common enemy) rather than the full-blown villain he is in cartoons like Assault and Peppered. The last cartoon featuring Daffy and Speedy is See Ya Later Gladiator, in what animation fans call the worst cartoon made by Warner Bros.

=== The Daffy Duck Show ===
In light of the longstanding popularity of The Bugs Bunny Show and its various incarnations on CBS and ABC, NBC commissioned their own half-hour series, The Daffy Duck Show, which began airing in the fall of 1978. While some well-known titles were included in the program, most of the cartoons featured on the series were from the late '60s DePatie-Freleng run. The program ran on NBC for two years, then in 1981 was rechristened The Daffy/Speedy Show and ran for another two years. Eventually, NBC canceled the series, and many of the cartoons were reintegrated into The Bugs Bunny and Road Runner Show package on CBS.

=== More recent years ===
Daffy appeared in later cartoons. He was one of many Looney Tunes characters allowed by Warner Bros. to appear in the 1988 Disney/Amblin film Who Framed Roger Rabbit. In the film, Daffy (utilizing his original, wacky characterization) shares a scene with his Disney counterpart Donald Duck whilst performing in a piano duel. He was animated by Dave Spafford. In 1987, to celebrate Daffy's 50th anniversary, Warner Bros. released "The Duxorcist" as its first theatrical Looney Tunes short in two decades. Daffy Duck also appeared in several feature-film compilations, including two films centered around himself. The first was released in 1983, Daffy Duck's Fantastic Island; the second came in 1988, Daffy Duck's Quackbusters, which is considered one of the Looney Tunes' best compilation films and featured another new theatrical short, "The Night of the Living Duck". Daffy has also had major roles in films such as Space Jam in 1996 and Looney Tunes: Back in Action in 2003. The latter film does much to flesh out his character, even going so far as to cast a sympathetic light on Daffy's glory-seeking ways in one scene, where he complains that he works tirelessly without achieving what Bugs does without even trying. That same year, Warner Bros. cast him in a new Duck Dodgers series, where Daffy Duck awakens in the future after being frozen in suspended animation. He had a cameo appearance in The Sylvester & Tweety Mysteries episode "When Granny Ruled the Earth", first airing on March 27, 1999. Daffy has also been featured in several webtoons, which can be viewed online.

Daffy has also made appearances on numerous television series. In Tiny Toon Adventures, Daffy is a teacher at Acme Looniversity, where he is the hero and mentor of student Plucky Duck. He is shown as a baby in Baby Looney Tunes, and appears to have a similar personality to his earlier years with his rivalry with Bugs and saying, "Woo-hoo!" often in the show. He made occasional cameo appearances on Animaniacs and Histeria!. In Loonatics Unleashed, his descendant is Danger Duck (voiced by Jason Marsden), whom his teammates consider lame and unpopular. A majority of these appearances try to emulate Chuck Jones' incarnation of the character.

Daffy has also been given larger roles in more recent Looney Tunes films and series. Following Looney Tunes: Back in Action, Warner Bros. has slowly moved the spotlight away from Bugs and more towards Daffy, as shown in the 2006 direct-to-video movie Bah, Humduck! A Looney Tunes Christmas, where Daffy plays the lead, while Bugs appears in a minor supporting role.

Daffy's appearance in The Looney Tunes Show (season 1)

However, more recent merchandise of the duck, as well as that featured on the official website, have been shown to incorporate elements of the zanier, more light-hearted Daffy of the 1930s and 1940s. Producer Larry Doyle noted that recent theatrical cartoons were planned that would portray a more diverse Daffy closer to that of Robert McKimson's design; however, due to the box office bomb of Looney Tunes: Back in Action, these new films ceased production.

Daffy returned to Cartoon Network in The Looney Tunes Show, voiced by Jeff Bergman. In the show, he has moved out of the forest and shares Bugs' house with him. Unlike Bugs and their neighbors, Daffy has no way of earning money and relies on Bugs to support him. He tried numerous get rich quick schemes, but ended up failing repeatedly. Daffy's one possession he is proud of is his paper-mache parade float, constructed on top of a flatbed truck, which is his main means of transportation. While Daffy's greed and jealousy of Bugs remains, he appears to be less antagonistic in this show, as Bugs even tells Daffy in spite of his faults, he is Bugs' best friend and vice versa. Daffy serves as a sort of mentor to Gossamer. Daffy has difficulty telling fiction from reality; he often confuses television shows for his own life, believes Bugs is Superman, and at one point hallucinates he is a wizard.

Daffy starred in the 3D short Daffy's Rhapsody with Elmer Fudd that was originally set to premiere before Happy Feet Two but instead debuted prior to Journey 2: The Mysterious Island. The short features Daffy and Elmer in the first CG or 3D depiction of these specific Looney Tunes characters. According to Matthew O'Callaghan, who directed the short, the audio comes from a 1950s recording for a children's album. Daffy is performing in a musical about hunting, when Elmer, who is in the audience, pursues him. Daffy is initially unaware of the danger, but quickly realizes the threat Elmer poses and outwits him by using the props against him.

Daffy appeared in the 2015 DTV movie Looney Tunes: Rabbits Run.

Daffy appears in the Cartoon Network series New Looney Tunes where he is voiced by Dee Bradley Baker. Daffy is often paired with Porky where Daffy will annoy and bedevil the pig, though occasionally Porky one ups Daffy.

Daffy appears in Looney Tunes Cartoons, where he is voiced by Eric Bauza.

Daffy appears in the preschool series Bugs Bunny Builders which currently airs on Cartoon Network's Cartoonito block and HBO Max. Eric Bauza reprises his role.

Daffy stars alongside Porky Pig in The Day the Earth Blew Up, both being voiced by Eric Bauza. Here, as the duo try to save their childhood home, Daffy stumbles upon an alien mind-control plot, determined to stop it alongside Porky and Petunia Pig.

Daffy appears in a minor supporting role in the 2026 film Coyote vs. Acme, again voiced by Eric Bauza. Here, Daffy was a former Acme employee who tested products for cartoons. However, when Foghorn Leghorn took over and launched Project Sisyphus, a project to use cartoons as test subjects to invent human products, Daffy was driven insane by the tests and was confined to the St. Looney's Asylum.

In April 2026, it was announced that a new theatrical Daffy animated short called Daffy Season, which is about Elmer Fudd being obsessed with soccer, would premiere at the 2026 Annecy Festival, making it the first theatrical short starring Daffy Duck since Daffy's Rhapsody. The film, produced at Warner Bros. Pictures Animation, is directed by Todd Wilderman and Hamish Grieve. This was the last time Daffy was voiced by Eric Bauza before his death in October 2026.

== Notable films ==
- Porky's Duck Hunt (1937) – debut
- Porky Pig's Feat (1943) – first appearance alongside Bugs Bunny
- Draftee Daffy (1945) – propaganda film by Bob Clampett
- Rabbit Fire (1951) - first film in the "Hunting trilogy" by Chuck Jones
- Duck Amuck (1953) – surreal comedy shorted by Chuck Jones and inducted into the National Film Registry
- Duck Dodgers in the 24½th Century (1953) – parody of Buck Rogers in the 25th Century and later adapted into a TV series
- See Ya Later Gladiator (1968) – final appearance in the Golden age of American animation
- Who Framed Roger Rabbit (1988) – cameo alongside Donald Duck
- Space Jam (1996) – appeared alongside NBA superstar, Michael Jordan
- Looney Tunes: Back in Action (2003) – appeared alongside Brendan Fraser, Jenna Elfman and Steve Martin
- Space Jam: A New Legacy (2021) – appeared alongside NBA superstar, LeBron James
- The Day the Earth Blew Up (2024) – appeared alongside Porky Pig and Petunia Pig
- Coyote vs. Acme (2026) – appears as a patient in a mental health asylum

== Comics ==
Dell Comics published several Daffy Duck comic books, beginning in Four Color Comics #457, #536, and #615 and then continuing as Daffy #4-17 (1956–59), then as Daffy Duck #18-30 (1959–62). The comic book series was subsequently continued in Gold Key Comics Daffy Duck #31-127 (1962–79). This run was in turn continued under the Whitman Comics imprint until the company completely ceased comic book publication in 1984. In 1994, corporate cousin DC Comics became the publisher for comics featuring all the classic Warner Bros. cartoon characters, and while not getting his own title, Daffy has appeared in many issues of Looney Tunes.

== Voice actors ==
- Mel Blanc (1937–1989, Bugs Bunny: Lost in Time; archive audio, Daffy's Rhapsody; archive audio)
- Bob Clampett (vocal effects in A Corny Concerto)
- Gil Turner (imitating Bing Crosby in Hollywood Daffy)
- Gilbert Mack (Golden Records records, Bugs Bunny Songfest)
- Dave Barry (Golden Records records, Bugs Bunny Songfest)
- Ginny Tyler ("singing" in Daffy's Inn Trouble)
- Unknown (Bugs Bunny Exercise and Adventure Album)
- Noel Blanc (The Looney Looney Looney Bugs Bunny Movie promotion, You Rang? answering machine messages, saying, "Happy Birthday Bugs!" in Bugs Bunny's Birthday Ball, 2001 Chevrolet Monte Carlo 400)
- Dave Spafford ("woo-hoos" in Who Framed Roger Rabbit)
- Bob Bergen (ABC Family Fun Fair, Duck Dodgers Movie Pitch)
- Mel Tormé (singing voice in Daffy Duck's Quackbusters)
- Jeff Bergman (1989 Macy's Thanksgiving Day Parade, Warner Catalog commercials, Cartoon All-Stars to the Rescue, Gremlins 2: The New Batch, Bugs Bunny's 50th Birthday Spectacular, Happy Birthday, Bugs!: 50 Looney Years, Tiny Toon Adventures, Tyson Foods commercials, Box Office Bunny, Bugs Bunny's Overtures to Disaster, (Blooper) Bunny, Invasion of the Bunny Snatchers, The Plucky Duck Show, Special Delivery Symphony, Cartoon Network bumpers, Boomerang bumpers, Ad Council commercial, The Looney Tunes Show, Mad, Scooby Doo and Looney Tunes: Cartoon Universe, Looney Tunes Dash, Looney Tunes: Rabbits Run, Who Stole My Chicken?, Wun Wabbit Wun, Daffy Duck Dance Off, Beep Beep Birthday, Bugs Bunny & The Giant Carrots, Ani-Mayhem, Meet Bugs (and Daffy))
- Joe Alaskey (Tiny Toon Adventures, Mrs. Bush's Story Time, Bugs Bunny's Lunar Tunes, Looney Tunes River Ride, Yosemite Sam and the Gold River Adventure!, Daffy Duck in Duck Troop to the Rescue read-along, Bugs Bunny and the Pink Flamingos read-along, Have Yourself a Looney Tunes Christmas, 67th Academy Awards, Carrotblanca read-along, Carrotblanca short, Bugs & Daffy Sing the Beatles, Bugs 'n' Daffy intro, Marvin the Martian in the Third Dimension, The Looney West, The Daffy Duck Show, Bugs & Friends Sing Elvis, Bugs Bunny's Learning Adventures, The Drew Carey Show, Warner Bros. Sing-Along: Quest for Camelot, The Sylvester & Tweety Mysteries, Warner Bros. Sing-Along: Looney Tunes, Crash! Bang! Boom! The Best of WB Sound FX, Tweety's High-Flying Adventure, The Looney Tunes Kwazy Christmas, Duck Dodgers, Looney Tunes: Back in Action, Daffy Duck for President, Bah, Humduck! A Looney Tunes Christmas, Looney Tunes: Laff Riot pilot, TomTom Looney Tunes GPS, Looney Tunes ClickN READ Phonics, Lego Batman 3: Beyond Gotham, various video games, webtoons, live shows, and commercials)
- Greg Burson (Bugs Bunny's Birthday Ball, Tiny Toon Adventures, Daffy Duck: The Marvin Missions, Merrie Melodies Starring Bugs Bunny & Friends promo, Animaniacs, Bugs Bunny: Rabbit Rampage, Acme Animation Factory, Looney Tunes B-Ball, Alpha-Bits commercial, Warner Bros. Kids Club, Quest for Camelot promotion, Looney Tunes: Back in Action animation test)
- Keith Scott (Looney Tunes Musical Revue, The Christmas Looney Tunes Classic Collection, Spectacular Light and Sound Show Illuminanza, Looney Tunes: We Got the Beat!, Looney Tunes: What's Up Rock?!, Looney Tunes on Ice, Looney Tunes LIVE! Classroom Capers, The Looney Tunes Radio Show, Looney Rock, Looney Tunes Christmas Carols, 2023 Australian Open, various commercials)
- Marcus Deon Thomas ("Party Zone", "Dynamite")
- Maurice LaMarche (Taz-Mania)
- Frank Gorshin (Superior Duck)
- Dee Bradley Baker (McDonald’s commercial, Space Jam: Bugs Bunny Interview, Space Jam, The Daffy Duck Show trailer, Space Jam (pinball), Boomerang bumpers, New Looney Tunes, Converse commercials)
- Marc Silk (Cartoon Network bumpers)
- Billy West (Histeria!)
- Jeff Bennett (Kids' WB bumper, "woo-hoos" in Looney Tunes: Back in Action, speaking voice in Sprint commercial, Wendy's commercial, Attack of the Drones, A Looney Tunes Sing-A-Long Christmas)
- Samuel Vincent (Baby Looney Tunes, Baby Looney Tunes' Eggs-traordinary Adventure)
- Tom Jones (speaking and singing in Jones' voice in the Duck Dodgers episode "Talent Show A Go-Go")
- Bill Farmer (Robot Chicken)
- Kevin Shinick (Mad)
- Gary Martin (Looney Tunes Take-Over Weekend promotion)
- Eric Bauza (Warner Bros. Animation logo, Looney Tunes: World of Mayhem, Looney Tunes Cartoons, Animaniacs, Bugs Bunny in The Golden Carrot, ESPN 30 for 30: The Bunny & THE GOAT, Space Jam: A New Legacy, Space Jam: A New Legacy live show, Bugs and Daffy's Thanksgiving Road Trip, Etihad Airways commercial, Bugs Bunny Builders, The Nutquacker, Acme Fools, Lights, Camera, Action: A WB100th Anniversary Celebration, Tiny Toons Looniversity, Teen Titans Go!, Looney Tunes pinball machine, The Day the Earth Blew Up, Bye Bye Bunny: A Looney Tunes Musical, Looney Tunes: Wacky World of Sports, ACME Fools LIVE!, Coyote vs. Acme, Daffy Season)
- Roger Black (Paradise PD)
- Kenny Pittenger (opera voice in the Looney Tunes Cartoons short "Eyes Wide Fudd")

== Other media ==
- In 1991, Daffy Duck had a number 58 hit in the UK charts with a house/dance record called "Party Zone", a record which featured songwriters/producers Giorgio and Martin Koppehele under one of their aliases, The Groove Gang (other aliases have included G. + M. Cope and Cymurai), and singers Marcus Deon Thomas and Aimee McCoy from Splash. The record was issued by Warner's eastwest label and spent three weeks in the UK charts. Its release was followed by "Dynamite" in 1992.
- In 1999, the United States Postal Service issued a 33 cent stamp, designed and illustrated by Ed Wleczyk of Warner Bros., featuring Daffy leaning against a rural mailbox with a "that's despicable" look directed at two letters in the mailbox that bear Bugs Bunny stamps.
- In the science-fiction TV series Babylon 5, Daffy Duck was revealed to be Michael Garibaldi's "second favorite thing". Garibaldi confirmed this once he showed a cartoon of Daffy as "Duck Dodgers" to perplexed Minbari ambassador Delenn. Later, a member of his security team, Zack Allen, theorized that Daffy was Garibaldi's "god of frustration".
- In a Shaun the Sheep short, titled "The Art Class", Daffy makes a cameo in one of the portraits Shaun is drawing. However, once the short was uploaded to YouTube and retitled "Duck Drawing", Daffy was replaced by a generic penguin possibly due to copyright issues.
- Daffy makes a vocal cameo appearance in the 2020 Animaniacs revival segment "Suffragette City", with Eric Bauza reprising his role.
- Daffy appears as a main character in the Teen Titans Go! episode "Bro, Where's the Batmobile?".
- Daffy appears as a playable character in 2025 Bullet Hell game, ACECRAFT.

== See also ==
- List of Daffy Duck cartoons
- Golden age of American animation
- Duck Dodgers
- Danger Duck

== Bibliography ==
- Adamson, Joe (1990). Bugs Bunny: 50 Years and Only One Grey Hare. Henry Holt & Co.
- Schneider, Steve (1990). That's All Folks!: The Art of Warner Bros. Animation. Henry Holt & Co. ISBN 0-8050-0889-6.
- Solomon, Charles (1994). The History of Animation: Enchanted Drawings. Random House Value Publishing. ISBN 0-517-11859-9.
