= Looney Tunes B-Ball =

1995 video game

- Developer: Sculptured Software
- Publisher: Sunsoft
- Director: Kiharu Yoshida
- Producer: René Boutin
- Designers: Ned Martin; David Siller
- Programmer: Dan Enfield
- Artist: Heinee Hinrichsen
- Writer: Alison Quirion
- Composers: H. Kingsley Thurber; James Hebdon; Mark Ganus
- Series: Looney Tunes
- Platform: Super Nintendo Entertainment System
- Release: NA: February 1995; EU: May 1995
- Genre: Sports
- Modes: Single-player, multiplayer

Looney Tunes B-Ball (also known as Looney Tunes Basketball in some regions) is a basketball video game developed by Sculptured Software and released by Sunsoft for the Super Nintendo Entertainment System in 1995.

== Gameplay ==
Gameplay screenshot

Looney Tunes B-Ball is an arcade-style basketball game starring the Looney Tunes. It is similar to other arcade-style basketball games of the 16-bit era, such as NBA Jam.

The game features 2-on-2 gameplay. Up to four human players can play simultaneously with the SNES Multitap. Players can collect gems on the court to purchase in-game power-ups, such as a protective forcefield or a cream pie to throw at opponents. Another power-up which can be purchased is a character-unique signature long-range shot (for a 3-point field goal). These shots can only be used by a character on his defensive side of the court and if his team has the funds to do so, but the shot always travels in the direction of the goal his team is attacking. The game ball will, at random, turn into a dog which will run around the court and automatically does this when a shot-clock violation occurs.

The game also includes in-game cheat codes, which can be used during gameplay, and are activated by inputting specific sequential button presses.

== Characters ==
- Bugs Bunny
- Daffy Duck
- Elmer Fudd
- Wile E. Coyote
- Tasmanian Devil
- Yosemite Sam
- Sylvester the Cat
- Marvin the Martian

All of the characters above, with the exception for Wile E. Coyote and Yosemite Sam (who had no spoken lines), were voiced by Greg Burson.

== Reception ==
Reception

Review scores
Publication	Score
GamePro	16.5/20
Next Generation	3/5
Consoles +	85%
MAN!AC	67%
Mega Fun	79%
Play Time	79%
Player One	90%
Power Unlimited	83/100
Total!	2- (B-)
Ultra Player	5/6
Video Games	70%
VideoGames	8/10

GamePro declared the game "great fun for any Looney Tunes or basketball fan", praising the humorous special moves, easy-to-handle controls, and fluid graphics. A reviewer for Next Generation likened the game to a Looney Tunes version of NBA Jam, and concluded it to be "fun for all ages and easy enough for younger players to play." He gave it three out of five stars.
