= Bugs Bunny's Birthday Ball =

1990 pinball game

- Bugs Bunny's Birthday Ball flyer
- Manufacturer: Midway
- Release date: December 1990
- System: Midway System 11C
- Players: 1-4
- Design: John Trudeau
- Programming: Dan Lee, Dwight Sullivan
- Artwork: Python Anghelo, John Youssi
- Mechanics: Jack Skalon
- Music: Paul Heitsch
- Sound: Paul Heitsch
- Voices: Greg Burson, Bob Bergen, Noel Blanc, Mel Blanc, Paul Julian, Paul Heitsch
- Concept: John Trudeau, Python Anghelo
- Production run: ~2,250 units

Bugs Bunny's Birthday Ball is a 1990 pinball game designed by John Trudeau and Python Anghelo and released by Midway (under the Bally name). It is based on Warner Bros.' Looney Tunes and Merrie Melodies series of cartoons. This is the first of only three licensed pinball tables ever to feature the Looney Tunes characters (the second being Sega's Space Jam and the third being Spooky Pinball's Looney Tunes).

== Layout ==
The backbox shows all the characters gathered around a giant birthday cake; the top of the candles have small gaps in the artwork so the lights behind twinkle through.

The game uses a split level playfield. The left parts slopes away from the player, with a single flipper at the far end of it. The top left of the main playfield has three rollover lanes. The game has a single ramp which leads to a whirlpool cup above the group of three pop bumpers. The game has two outlanes on the left side of the machine, and no outlane on the right side. A captive ball can be hit from both the main playfield and the inverted playfield. There are a series of targets around the playfield, including those spelling L-O-O-N-E-Y T-U-N-E-S.

== Gameplay ==
The player must use the "Skill Shot" to help Wile E. Coyote chase the Road Runner, break some eggs in the reversed "Chicken Coop" playfield, then ride "Tweety's Slide" to the main playfield and score 1 million points, hit Daffy Duck for a "Big Score" of 500,000 points and light "Speedy Gonzales' Keek-Out" for 1 million points, then shoot the curving, swerving center ramp so the Tasmanian Devil and the Tasmanian She-Devil will take the player on a challenging "Tazmanian Shopping Spree" up the ramp, which will score up to 500,000 points or an extra ball. If the player helps Bugs blow out all the candles on his cake, Honey Bunny will reward him with a 50 million bonus, with the player getting their opponents' best score for a Surprise Package.

In multi-player operation, a unique playfield award feature exchanges scores between players.

== Development ==
According to Python Anghelo, he was given a total of 3 months by management to design the game from concept to final build in 1990. This was due to the fact that the factory workers were running out of games to assemble and needed something to fill a gap in the Bally production line. Anghelo had previously drawn a crude and perverse illustration of Wile E. Coyote and the Road Runner on a whiteboard in Williams Electronics, Inc.'s HR department. When he and John Trudeau were developing the game and The Machine: Bride of Pin-Bot simultaneously, they worked insanely fast on both games in a short time, doing so much that one day Anghelo gave Trudeau the nickname of "Doctor Flash". It stuck from that point. Anghelo and John Youssi designed artwork for the game with assistance from animator Bob Kirk. The game was programmed by Dan Lee and Dwight Sullivan.

Warner Bros. expressed reluctance to have a single voice actor succeed Mel Blanc, who had died in 1989, so they employed other voice actors to provide the Looney Tunes characters' voices for the game. Jeff Bergman was originally going to voice the characters, (Note: Bergman is credited under "Special Thanks To" on the left side of the machine's playfield.) but was replaced with Greg Burson, Bob Bergen and Mel's son Noel Blanc. The music and sound effects were composed and designed by Paul Heitsch, who also did the "trombone gobble" sound effect.

The game came with licensed products available at special discounted prices for operators interested in staging on-site promotions, contests and tournaments. In addition, authorized Bally/Midway distributors could also take advantage of those offers for point-of-display items, or sales support merchandise to their customer base. The companies participating in the marketing program included Armitron, Creative Innovations, E.M. International, H. & L. Enterprises, Koochy Koncepts, Nikry Company, Rarities Mint, United Brands International, Zephyr Group, and others.

== Release and reception ==
The game was released in December 1990 to coincide with the 50th anniversary ("birthday") of Bugs Bunny earlier that year. The game was not well received by pinball players, and only sold 2,500 units. Anghelo admitted disappointment in the final product, feeling embarrassed that despite his and Trudeau's efforts, they had allowed something "so half-baked" to go to market. He explained the tepid response, stating, "It depends what we have in our hearts... either The Force is with you, or it's not.". In a Play Meter review, Tom Yager found the game to be too easy and the main playfield to be slow and mostly unproductive, and disliked the sunken inverted playfield. The other gimmick in multiplayer games of randomly awarding points or swapping scores was also criticized. Nonetheless, Replay Magazine ranked it as the third most popular pinball machine of 1990.

The choice of using Looney Tunes as a theme was believed to have also contributed to the mixed reception. Roger Sharpe, marketing director for Midway at the time, touted the game as something that would appeal to women and families. However, some found the theme too juvenile while others considered pinball not family friendly regardless of theme.

A 2001 review by Pinball Player praised the artwork, and the sound was called "good for its time". Some elements of the playfield were called innovative, but not all ideas worked. The gameplay aspect was given 2/10 due to the chance of a random award giving 50M points making much of the rest of the scoring redundant.

== Voice cast ==
- Greg Burson as Bugs Bunny (speaking), Daffy Duck, Sylvester the Cat (spitting), Tasmanian Devil and Foghorn Leghorn
- Noel Blanc as Bugs Bunny (vocal effects), Daffy Duck (saying "Happy Birthday, Bugs!"), Yosemite Sam, Sylvester the Cat ("oofs" and "ows"), Speedy Gonzales, Barnyard Dawg and Chickens
- Bob Bergen as Porky Pig and Tweety Bird
- Mel Blanc as Sylvester the Cat (archive recording)
- Paul Julian as Road Runner (archive recording)
- Paul Heitsch as Trombone Gobble
