= Bugs Bunny Rabbit Rampage =

1994 video game

- North American cover art
- Developer: Viacom New Media
- Publisher: Sunsoft
- Platform: Super Nintendo Entertainment System
- Release: NA: February 1994; JP: June 24, 1994; EU: September 29, 1994
- Genre: Action
- Mode: Single-player

Bugs Bunny Rabbit Rampage (Note: Known in Japan as Bugs Bunny's Hachamecha Daibōken (Japanese: バックス･バニーはちゃめちゃ大冒険, Hepburn: Bakkusu Banī Hachamecha Daibōken) lit. Bugs Bunny's Insane Great Adventure) is an action video game developed by Viacom New Media (a then-sister company to Nickelodeon, who had broadcast Looney Tunes cartoons at the time of the game's release) and published by Sunsoft released exclusively for the SNES in 1994. The player controls Bugs Bunny as he fights traditional Looney Tunes villains in order to confront the main villain of the story, animator Daffy Duck. The game's title is derived from the 1955 animated short with the same name, which follows a similar plot of Bugs at the mercy of an antagonistic animator, revealed to be Elmer Fudd. The characters in the game were voiced by Greg Burson.

== Gameplay ==
The goal of the game is to guide Bugs, who is trapped by Daffy Duck in a painting and has to traverse through various stages based on old Looney Tunes shorts. Bugs can jump, dive into holes, and attack by either jumping, kicking, pieing, or perform a spin attack that drains his health, which is in the form of a carrot. He can regain his health by finding carrots which become scarce as the game progresses as well as items that either stun or kill enemies in one hit. The game features characters such as Elmer Fudd, Marvin the Martian, Yosemite Sam, the Tasmanian Devil, and Wile E. Coyote, many of whom function as a boss towards the end of a level. The levels vary from simply going left to right to making your way down while avoiding enemies who become harder to defeat such as pigs who harm Bugs with various projectiles coming from their slingshots, robots who will electrocute Bugs if he gets too close, and black cats that can cause Bugs to get crushed by various objects such as safes and horses due to superstition if he crosses their path. In some levels, you will have to learn how to out think and out maneuver some bosses such as Toro the Bull from the short Bully For Bugs (1953) and Taz, while also figuring out how to damage them.

In the final level, Bugs has to spill all of the paint Daffy uses while avoiding all 3 of his alter-egos. After spilling all of the paint, Bugs then has to defeat Drip-Along Daffy if all the paint hasn't been spilled, or Robin Hood Daffy if all the paint was spilled, as well as avoid Duck Dodgers who is invincible and can kill Bugs in one hit with his laser blaster.

When the credits play, tons of dynamite are shown in. After the credits finish rolling, Daffy pops up and says, "You're despicable!" The "That's All Folks" title card appears, and an explosion shakes the camera.

== Reception ==
Reception

Aggregate score
Aggregator	Score
GameRankings	75.50%

Review scores
Publication	Score
AllGame	3.5/5
Aktueller Software Markt	9/12
Computer and Video Games	83/100
Famitsu	5/10, 5/10; 6/10, 5/10
HobbyConsolas	85/100
Micromanía	84/100
Nintendo Power	(Note: Graphics: 4.3/5, Play Control: 3.2/5, Challenge: 3.8/5, Theme: 4/5)
Superjuegos	90/100
Nintendo Acción	82/100
Super Action	88%
Super Control	91%

Bugs Bunny Rabbit Rampage garnered a highly favorable 4.3-out-of-five review from Nintendo Power, giving much praise to the graphics, animation, variety of level types and audio and writing that "Sunsoft uses the Looney Tune license for the maximum effect and fun".

The game currently holds a 75.50% rating on review aggregation website GameRankings.
