= Yosemite Sam and the Gold River Adventure! =

Defunct dark boat ride

Six Flags Over Texas
- Area: Texas
- Status: Removed
- Opening date: June 15, 1992
- Closing date: September 22, 2018
- Replaced: The Spee-Lunker Cave
- Replaced by: Pirates of Speelunker Cave

General statistics
- Type: Dark ride
- Manufacturer: Arrow Dynamics
- Designer: R&R Creative Amusement Designs, Inc. Sally Corporation
- Lift system: 5 feet
- Speed: 3 mph (4.8 km/h)
- Duration: 7:00
- Boats: 3 boats. Riders are arranged 4 across in 2 rows for a total of 8 riders per boat.
- Must transfer from wheelchair

Yosemite Sam and the Gold River Adventure! was a dark boat ride at the amusement park Six Flags Over Texas in Arlington, Texas. The ride opened on June 15, 1992, as a replacement for The Spee-Lunker Cave, and closed on September 22, 2018, before being replaced by Pirates of Speelunker Cave in 2022.

== History ==
Yosemite Sam and the Gold River Adventure! opened at Six Flags Over Texas on June 15, 1992. The ride originally opened as The Spee-Lunker Cave (also known as The Cave on its entrance and layout) in 1964. Despite not having a storyline, the ride showed the peculiar alien characters in various scenes that occasionally changed from season-to-season. After Time Warner Entertainment purchased the Six Flags chain, the Spee-Lunkers were removed and replaced with Looney Tunes characters by the beginning of the 1992 season. Bob Bennett, the president of Six Flags Over Texas, stated that The Spee-Lunker Cave was closed because Six Flags needed a family ride that would bring them into the 20th century, and the ride was very dated. Alan Reynolds, a former Six Flags employee, and many nostalgic park guests would often petition to bring the Spee-Lunkers back.

On the night of September 21, 2018 and the morning of September 22, 2018, Six Flags Over Texas was hit by flash floods that caused damage to the park. Water levels in the Tower and Boomtown sections reached nearly 8 feet, causing damage to restaurants and buildings and forcing rides to be closed for repairs and inspections. The entire show building for Yosemite Sam and the Gold River Adventure! was flooded, with the boats floating into walls, set pieces and animatronics. The incident resulted in irreparable damage to the animatronics, lights and special effects throughout the attraction, which were already in poor condition after 25 years of operation prior to the flood. After an extensive retheming, the ride reopened on May 14, 2022, as Pirates of Speelunker Cave, paying homage to the original Spee-Lunker Cave ride and its Spee-Lunker inhabitants (now named "Speelunkers").

== Ride experience ==
The ride began with guests entering a warehouse named Acme Freight Lines. Inside, they went past a stall with various Acme crates and a television displaying Looney Tunes and Merrie Melodies cartoons like Bunny Hugged on its screen. They exited the warehouse and queued outside an enormous two-story wooden depot, complete with a giant water tower and oil derrick, and came across a notice sign by Bugs Bunny, the captain of the Texas Rangers. The sign read, "Guards needed for gold shipments. Low pay, long hours, danger everywhere.... apply now!" This helped provide the backstory before the ride began. Below the sign was a crate with the Tasmanian Devil and the Tasmanian She-Devil grunting, growling and rasping inside.

Guests got on 3 small oval-shaped fiberglass boats, each with 2 rows of 4 seats each, before being taken through the bank. Yosemite Sam robs the bank and steals the gold, leaving the bank's security guard, Elmer Fudd, crying upon the realization that he has been "wobbed". After that, the guests meet Bugs, who deputizes them to help him catch Sam and, along with Speedy Gonzales, points in his direction. The guests then go through a tunnel, where the Road Runner pops out from behind a wall saying, "Beep, beep!" After exiting the tunnel, they come across Wile E. Coyote, who hoists a large anvil on a rope (above some birdseed and in front of a painted bullseye) with one hand and tugs on a cannon pointed the Road Runner in the other. However, his plan backfires, leaving Wile E. caught up in a bind and holding a sign saying, "Help!"

The guests are then ambushed by Sam, who emerges from behind a pile of rocks, taunting them and saying that they will never catch him. He fires his guns at them and laughs, but misses his target and hits some of Chug-a-Lug Waterworks' barrels, causing water from inside the barrels to spray out onto the guests. After that, the guests go past a scene where Daffy Duck attempts to sell them some Texas "T" Tea. Around the bend, Porky Pig appears on the back of his donkey from Drip-Along Daffy. He tells the guests to go after Sam, pointing in the outlaw's direction. The guests arrive at an ore hoist stack in the Kicked Bucket Gold Mine. As their boats are pulled up a lift, Tweety sits on a crate and calls for help, telling them that Sylvester will get them blown up. Sylvester pulls on a lever and yells to the guests to leave as the hoist is about to blow. The guests' boats suddenly drop down into a steam-filled mine shaft, and they find themselves out on the prairie sunset, where they discover Sam trying to lever a boulder off a cliff onto their path. Next, guests go past the Texas Ranger's campsite, where Bugs deputizes Daffy (who wears his attire from Drip-Along Daffy) and Speedy to help him catch Sam. The guests go past geysers named Old Unreliable and Some-What Faithful, and encounter Sam, who laughs and attempts to give them the slip with lots of explosives. Suddenly, Bugs pops out of a hole with some long fuses and puts them to Sam's lit match, which causes an explosion. The guests then enter a room that lights up, revealing a charred Sam, who vows revenge on Bugs.

The guests come across a livery stable, from which Speedy appears and tells them that Sam has robbed another bank. He then runs off, and pops out of a barrel to encourage them to keep their heads down, as Sam and Daffy are having a shootout. Daffy tries to shoot Sam, but lacks aim, wildly missing his target and hitting a barrel, a spittoon and two lanterns, while Sam laughs and taunts him. Suddenly, the Texas Ranger's Office's doors swing open, revealing Bugs with a cannon pointed at Sam, and holding a sign saying, "Nice try, Sam!" (when the ride first opened, Bugs did not hold a sign). He blasts Sam with the cannon, which uses a red light when fired to simulate cannon fire (when the ride first opened, the cannon would emit smoke). The guests then enter the jailhouse, where Sam is behind bars and Speedy is standing on a stool, holding the keys to Sam's cell. Back at the office, Bugs and Elmer celebrate Sam's capture and the gold's return, and Bugs discharges the guests. Pictures depicting stills from Rebel Rabbit, Rabbit Every Monday, Drip-Along Daffy and Zoom and Bored can be found on the walls. The guests go through a wall designed to resemble the Looney Tunes rings with text saying, "That's all Folks!" (when the ride first opened, Porky could be heard saying, "Th-th-th-th-that's all, rangers!" whenever the guests went through the wall), which leads to a tunnel with lanterns and Acme crates, and return to the loading station. The guests are unloaded, and exit using a bridge and go under the Texas Rangers' lookout tower, with Bugs in it.

== Voice cast ==
- Greg Burson as Bugs Bunny and Elmer Fudd
- Joe Alaskey as Daffy Duck, Sylvester, and Speedy Gonzales
- Bob Bergen as Porky Pig and Tweety
- Maurice LaMarche as Yosemite Sam
- Mel Blanc as Tasmanian Devil and Tasmanian She-Devil (archive recordings)
- Paul Julian as Road Runner (archive recordings)

== Ride design ==
Yosemite Sam and the Gold River Adventure! reused the ride system from The Spee-Lunker Cave, manufactured by Arrow Dynamics. The ride was designed and art-directed by R&R Creative Designs, Inc. It was originally planned to be named Yosemite Sam and the River of Gold. The ride's story was written by R&R co-founder and president Rick Bastrup. The ride featured more than 125 special effects and 24 scenes with 29 audio-animatronics, designed by Sally Corporation. The retheme was done between November 1991 and 1992, and cost over $5,000,000. The theme song for the 1974 film Blazing Saddles is interwoven throughout the score for the ride, composed by Kevin Nadeau. The sound design was done by Robb Wenner at New Noise. Since there was still relevant interest in The Spee-Lunker Cave at the time, tributes to the ride were included in the form of wanted posters: "Wanted" (bank scene), "Wanted: The Spee-Lunker Organist for Piping" (shootout scene), and "Wanted: Spee-Lunker Band" (jailhouse scene).

== See also ==
- Looney Tunes River Ride, another now defunct water ride at Warner Bros. Movie World.
