= Greg Burson =

American voice actor (1949–2008)

- Born: Gregory Lewis Burson; August 15, 1949; Anaheim, California, U.S.
- Died: July 22, 2008 (aged 58); Los Angeles, California, U.S.
- Occupation: Voice actor
- Years active: 1981–2005

Gregory Lewis Burson (August 15, 1949 – July 22, 2008) was an American voice actor. He was best known for being one of the many successors to voice actors Daws Butler (who was also Burson's mentor) and Mel Blanc following their deaths in 1988 and 1989 respectively.

== Career ==
One of Burson's earliest jobs, which did not pay well but got him lots of attention, was doing the voiceover for a Dianetics commercial for Scientology. He was trained by Daws Butler, who was his acting mentor and one of his influences. Following Butler's death, Burson inherited most of his characters, starting with Yogi Bear on The New Yogi Bear Show and many other characters in Hanna-Barbera-related shows. Burson based his Yogi voice on Butler's portrayal in the earlier Yogi Bear episodes, due to having grown up watching them as a child. He also inherited the role of Mr. Magoo in the animated segments of the live action feature film of the same name in 1997 (after Jim Backus died in 1989).

Burson was also one of the successors to Mel Blanc, and voiced many of his characters as well, including Bugs Bunny, for whom he was given the responsibility of voicing in 1995's Carrotblanca, a well-received 8-minute Looney Tunes cartoon originally shown in cinemas alongside The Amazing Panda Adventure (USA and Canada) and The Pebble and the Penguin (non-US). It has since then released on video, packaged with older Looney Tunes cartoons, and was even included in the special edition DVD release of Casablanca, of which it is both a parody and a homage. Burson found Bugs' voice difficult to get right, eventually basing it on Blanc's portrayal in the 1950s.

Burson also voiced Bugs in the 1997 short From Hare to Eternity, which is notable for being dedicated to Friz Freleng (who had died in 1995). It was also notable for being the final Looney Tunes cartoon that Chuck Jones had directed before his death in 2002. Burson also provided Bugs' voice in new animation for Bugs 'n' Daffy, which ran on Kids' WB from 1995 to 1998. Alternating with Jeff Bergman, Bob Bergen, Joe Alaskey, Jim Cummings, Maurice LaMarche, and Billy West, he also voiced several other Looney Tunes characters including Daffy Duck, Porky Pig, Tweety, Sylvester, Elmer Fudd, Yosemite Sam, Marvin the Martian, Tasmanian Devil, Pepé Le Pew, Speedy Gonzales, and Foghorn Leghorn on various Warner Bros. animated television series, films, toys, and video games.

His other voice work includes shows such as CatDog, Batman: The Animated Series, All-New Dennis the Menace, Mother Goose and Grimm, The Angry Beavers, Johnny Bravo, Samurai Jack, The Smurfs, Super Friends, The Twisted Tales of Felix the Cat and Garfield and Friends, the feature film Jurassic Park and the three Star Wars video games The Phantom Menace, Jedi Power Battles, and The Gungan Frontier.

In 1995, at the height of the popularity of R. L. Stine's Goosebumps book and television series, though not known at the time, and his only performance in it, he was also the voice behind one version of the commercial that promoted the "Goosebumps Fan Club" in some of the old VHS tapes of the television show of the same name, while Tony Jay recorded a second version of the same promo. Burson also lent his voice to several promos for Fox Kids.

== Legal issues ==
In May 2004, Burson was arrested by detectives after barricading himself inside his home in Tujunga for six hours before surrendering. Initial reports claimed that an armed S.W.A.T. team had responded to a call from two of his female roommates that he was drunk, armed and holding a third female roommate hostage. Officers later discovered that he had a collection of guns in his home. Burson also screamed a stream of nonsensical words at the police when they were alerted to his home; one officer said, "He was so drunk, we couldn't tell if he was trying to do one of his voices or was just slurring his words." Officer Rudy Villarreal confirmed that all three women involved in the incident lived with Burson, but none of them were harmed. The incident resulted in Burson being blacklisted for the rest of his life.

== Death ==
After losing voice-over work, Burson struggled with depression and alcoholism. On July 22, 2008, he died as a result of complications from diabetes and arteriosclerosis. He was 58 years old.

== Filmography ==
=== Film ===
List of voice performances in feature and direct-to-video films
Year	Title	Role	Notes
1989	Little Nemo: Adventures in Slumberland	Flap and Nemo's Father	
1989	Asterix and the Big Fight	Chief Bombastix, Franksinatrix, Sergeant Noodles	English American dub
1989	D.A.R.E. Bear Yogi	Yogi Bear, Doggie Daddy, Captain Caveman	Public service announcement
1989	Six Flags Magic Mountain: The Ultimate Adventure	Narrator	Souvenir video for Six Flags Magic Mountain
1991	Yakety Yak, Take It Back	Bugs Bunny	Music video
1991	Rappin' N' Rhymin'	Yogi Bear	
1992	Tom and Jerry: The Movie	Moving Man	
1993	Jurassic Park	Mr. DNA	
1993	I Yabba-Dabba Do!	Additional Voices	Television film
1993	The D.A.R.E. Report: The Land of Decisions and Choices	Tommy's Grandfather, Puppy, Iggy, Joint, Additional Voices	
1994	Scooby-Doo! in Arabian Nights	Yogi Bear and Royal Chef	Television film
1994	Yogi the Easter Bear	Yogi Bear	Television film
1995	Carrotblanca	Bugs Bunny, Foghorn Leghorn, Pepé Le Pew and Airport PA Announcer	
1996	Space Jam	Elmer Fudd (two scenes) and Foghorn Leghorn (some lines)	Uncredited
1997	From Hare to Eternity	Bugs Bunny	
1997	Mr. Magoo	Mr. Quincy Magoo (animated form), Window Cleaner, Henry	
2003	Looney Tunes: Stranger than Fiction	Foghorn Leghorn, Barnyard Dawg, and Pepé Le Pew	Direct-to-video
2003	Looney Tunes: Reality Check	Foghorn Leghorn	Direct-to-video
2004	My Generation G...G... Gap	Security Guard, Commercial Announcer	
2005	Hanna-Barbera Presents: Mr. B in Happy Birthday to You!	Yogi Bear, Snagglepuss	Final role appearance

=== Television ===
List of voice performances in television shows
Year	Title	Role	Notes
1981	Super Friends	Keelhaul Kelly, Additional Voices	1 episode
1982	The Smurfs	Additional Voices	1 episode
1987–1990	The Real Ghostbusters	Dib Devlin, Casey Jones, Gorgar	3 episodes
1988	The New Yogi Bear Show	Yogi Bear	
1988–1990	Fantastic Max	Additional Voices	
1989	A Yabba Dabba Doo Celebration: 50 Years of Hanna-Barbera	Yogi Bear, Huckleberry Hound, Quick Draw McGraw, Snuffles, Snagglepuss	Television special
1990	Wake, Rattle, and Roll	Yogi Bear, Huckleberry Hound, Quick Draw McGraw, Snagglepuss	
1990–1992	Tiny Toon Adventures	Elmer Fudd, Pepé Le Pew, Bugs Bunny, Daffy Duck, Porky Pig, Tasmanian Devil, Foghorn Leghorn	
1991–1992	Mother Goose and Grimm	Attila	
1991	Yo Yogi!	Yogi Bear, Quick Draw McGraw, Snagglepuss, Officer Smith, Mr. Jinks, Loopy De Loop, Lippy the Lion, Peter Potamus, Uncle Undercover	
1991	Tom & Jerry Kids	Nefarious Wolf, Chase School Teacher	1 episode
1992–1994	Garfield and Friends	Additional Voices	12 episodes
1993	All-New Dennis the Menace	Mr. Wilson	
1993	Batman: The Animated Series	Mad Dog	2 episodes
1993	Droopy, Master Detective	Additional Voices	
1993	Taz-Mania	Bugs Bunny, Tony Tortoise, Foghorn Leghorn	2 episodes
1993–1997	Animaniacs	Bugs Bunny, Daffy Duck, Porky Pig, Tweety, Foghorn Leghorn, Yosemite Sam	3 episodes
1995	The Twisted Tales of Felix the Cat	Additional Voices	2 episodes
1995–1996	The Baby Huey Show	The Fox	Season 2 only
1995–1998	The Sylvester & Tweety Mysteries	Elmer Fudd, Pepé Le Pew, Cot Martin, Ed McMuffin	4 episodes
1995–1998	Bugs 'n' Daffy	Bugs Bunny	Main theme only
1996	The Real Adventures of Jonny Quest	Corbin, Sanderson	1 episode
1997	Johnny Bravo	The Ghostly Gardener	1 episode
1997–1998	Channel Umptee—3	Professor I. Revelent	
1998	CatDog	Barry the Baboon	1 episode
1999	A Day in the Life of Ranger Smith	Yogi Bear, Squirrel Girl	Television special
1999	The Angry Beavers	Judge Otter, Otter #1	1 episode
2002	Samurai Jack	Quick Draw McGraw	1 episode

=== Video games ===
Year	Title	Role	Notes
1990	Bugs Bunny's Birthday Ball	Bugs Bunny (speaking), Daffy Duck, Sylvester (spitting), Tasmanian Devil, Foghorn Leghorn	Pinball machine
1993	Taz-Mania	Tasmanian Devil	Super NES version
1993	Daffy Duck: The Marvin Missions	Duck Dodgers	Super NES version
1994	Bugs Bunny: Rabbit Rampage	Bugs Bunny, Daffy Duck, Porky Pig, Elmer Fudd, Marvin the Martian, Tasmanian Devil, Nasty Canasta, Toro the Bull, The Crusher, Bird	
1994	Acme Animation Factory	Bugs Bunny, Daffy Duck, Porky Pig, Speedy Gonzales, Marvin the Martian	
1995	Looney Tunes B-Ball	Bugs Bunny, Daffy Duck, Elmer Fudd, Sylvester, Marvin the Martian, Tasmanian Devil, Director	
1995	Speedy Gonzales: Los Gatos Bandidos	Speedy Gonzales	
1995	Porky Pig's Haunted Holiday	Porky Pig	
1999	Star Wars Episode I: The Gungan Frontier	Boss Rugor Nass, Gungan Librarian	
1999	Star Wars Episode I: The Phantom Menace	Boss Rugor Nass, Guard Door, Injured Soldier #1, Jabba's Porter, Shop Owner	
2000	Star Wars Episode I: Jedi Power Battles	Boss Rugor Nass, Peck	
2000	Wacky Races	Red Max, Sergeant Blast, Peter Perfect, Rufus Ruffcut	
2000	Star Wars: Jar Jar's Journey Adventure Book	Boss Nass, Tower Announcer	
2001	Sheep, Dog, 'n' Wolf	Elmer Fudd, Phantoms	
2015	Lego Jurassic World	Mr. DNA	(archive footage)

=== Theme parks ===
Year	Title	Role	Notes
1990	The Funtastic World of Hanna-Barbera	Yogi Bear	
1991	Looney Tunes River Ride	Bugs Bunny, Elmer Fudd, Yosemite Sam, Foghorn Leghorn, Pepé Le Pew, Narrator	
1992	Yosemite Sam and the Gold River Adventure!	Bugs Bunny, Elmer Fudd	
1992	Bugs Bunny Goin' Hollywood	Bugs Bunny, Foghorn Leghorn	
1993	The Toonite Show Starring Bugs Bunny	Bugs Bunny, Sylvester, Tasmanian Devil, Pepé Le Pew	
1993	Mickey's Starland Show	D.U.D.E (fourth version)	
1995	The Bugs Bunny Wacky World Games	Bugs Bunny, Marvin the Martian	
1997	Warner Bros. Kids Club	Bugs Bunny, Daffy Duck, Yosemite Sam, Tweety, Sylvester, Tasmanian Devil	
1999	Looney Tunes: What's Up, Rock?	Bugs Bunny, Foghorn Leghorn	

=== Radio ===
Year	Title	Role	Notes
1990–1994	Mrs. Bush's Story Time	Bugs Bunny, Yogi Bear	

=== Discography ===
Year	Title	Role	Notes
1987	Network Sound Effects Demo	Newscaster, Announcer	
1992	Bugs Bunny: Stowaway	Bugs Bunny	
1992	Bugs Bunny and the Pink Flamingos	Bugs Bunny	
1992	Daffy Duck in Duck Troop to the Rescue	Bugs Bunny	
1993	This Land is Our Land: The Yogi Bear Environmental Album	Yogi Bear, Huckleberry Hound, Snagglepuss, Quick Draw McGraw, George Jetson	
1994	Have Yourself a Looney Tunes Christmas	Bugs Bunny, Elmer Fudd, Foghorn Leghorn, Pepé Le Pew	
1995	Bugs Bunny in Carrotblanca	Bugs Bunny, Foghorn Leghorn	
1996	The Looney West	Bugs Bunny (speaking), Foghorn Leghorn, Pepé Le Pew	
1997	Bugs and Friends Sing Elvis	Foghorn Leghorn, Pepé Le Pew	

Preceded by Daws Butler	Voice of Yogi Bear; 1988–2003	Succeeded by Jeff Bergman
Preceded by Daws Butler	Voice of Huckleberry Hound; 1988-2003	Succeeded by Jeff Bergman
Preceded by Daws Butler	Voice of Quick Draw McGraw; 1989-2002	Succeeded by Jeff Bergman
Preceded by Daws Butler	Voice of Snagglepuss; 1989-2002	Succeeded by Jeff Bergman
