= Splash (German band) =

- Origin: Munich, Germany
- Genres: Eurodance, hip house
- Years active: 1990–1994
- Labels: WEA, Nu Trax, CDL
- Past members: Giorgio Koppehele; Martin Koppehele; Marcus Deon Thomas; Aimee McCoy

Splash was a German Eurodance group active in the first half of the 1990s, which consisted of founder/producers Giorgio and Martin Koppehele (G. + M. Cope), with Marcus Deon Thomas a.k.a. Eric P. III and Aimee McCoy as its singers.

== Career ==
The project started in 1990 with the single "I Need Rhythm", followed by the singles "Set the Groove on Fire" and "Joy and Pain" in 1991. They released their self-titled debut album in 1991, under WEA (subsidiary of Warner Music Group).

The single "Got 2 Have Your Love" was released in 1992 on the label Nu Trax, followed by "Tell Me Why" (featuring Asher D.) in 1993, and "All I Do" (1994) and "One More Dream" in 1994. Their second album Just a Party was also released that year.

After the group's demise, Marcus Deon Thomas joined the group Pharao with singer Kyra Pharao, where he became known under the alias Deon Blue. Aimee McCoy ended her singing career.

== Discography ==
=== Albums ===
Year	Title	Peak chart positions	
Year	Title	GER	UK
1991	Splash (WEA)	-	-
1994	Just a Party (Nu Trax)	-	-

=== Singles ===
Year	Title	Peak chart positions		Label
Year	Title	GER	UK	Label
1990	"I Need Rhythm"	41 (10 weeks)	88 (3 weeks)	WEA
1991	"Set the Groove on Fire"	30 (11 weeks)	-	WEA
1991	"Joy and Pain"	44 (5 weeks)	-	WEA
1992	"Got 2 Have Your Love"	-	-	Nu Trax
1993	"Tell Me Why" (feat. Asher D)	-	-	Nu Trax
1994	"All I Do"	-	-	Nu Trax
1994	"One More Dream"	91 (2 weeks)	-	Cologne Dance Label (CDC)
