= Now Museum Now You Don't =

Now Museum, Now You Don't may refer to:

- Now Museum-Now You Don't, an episode of The Venture Bros.
- "Now Museum, Now You Don't" (The Simpsons), a 2020 episode
- Now Museum, Now You Don't, an episode of 1990's Bill & Ted's Excellent Adventures
- Now Museum, Now You Don't, an episode of A Pup Named Scooby-Doo
- Now Museum, Now You Don't, a 1997 animated Tamagotchi video
- What Do You Think of Ukiyoe Blues? (Now Museum, Now You Don't), an episode of Lupin III Part II
- Now Museum: Now You Don't, a 2002 album by Andy Dixon
