= Lupin the 3rd Part II season 3 =

Lupin the 3rd Part II
- Season 3
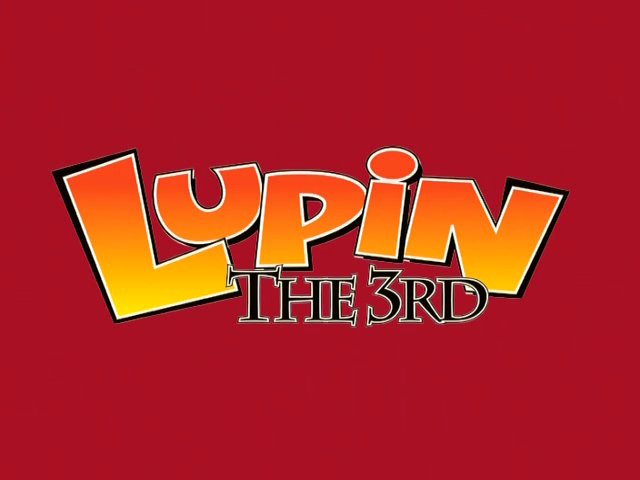
- Title card used in Pioneer Entertainment's English release
- No. of episodes: 52

Release
- Original network: NTV
- Original release: October 2, 1978 – October 1, 1979

Season chronology
- ← Previous; Season 2 Next → Season 4

Lupin the 3rd Part II, also known as Shin Lupin III or simply as Lupin III for the American market, is a Japanese anime series based on the manga by Monkey Punch and is produced by Tokyo Movie Shinsha. The third season, which contains 52 episodes, aired between October 2, 1978, and October 1, 1979, on NTV. Twenty-six episodes of English adaptation of the anime aired on Adult Swim starting on January 13, 2003, while episode 79 (the 28th episode of the third season) was the last episode to be released dubbed into English. The opening theme is "Lupin III '79" (ルパン三世'79) by Yuji Ohno, while the ending theme is "Love Squall" (ラブスコール) by Sandii Hohn.

== Episode list ==
| No. overall | No. in season | Japanese translated title / English title (Note: "English titles" are those found on the Region 1 DVD release by Pioneer/Geneon Entertainment for episodes 52–80 and found on Crunchyroll's streaming release for episodes 81–103.) | Original release date |
|---|---|---|---|
| 52 | 1 | "Emmanuelle Whispers Like an Angel" / "Emmanuelle in Bangkok"; Transliteration: "Emmanuelle wa Tenshi no Sasayaki" (Japanese: エマニエルは天使のささやき) | October 2, 1978 |
A canon for eternal life and youth is said to be concealed in the jungles of Thailand. Not only is Fujiko after it, but so is the beautiful and coldly intelligent Emmanuelle Poirot, granddaughter of the legendary detective, Hercule Poirot. With Surrender, her cat with poisoned claws. Lupin goes to the temple where the canon is said to be, being manipulated all the way, and takes the challenge of stealing the canon from the footstone containing it!! A beautiful trap is set, stealing even into the heart.
| 53 | 2 | "The Maniacal Fantômas Mark III" / "I Melt with You"; Transliteration: "Kyooki no Fantoma Mark III" (Japanese: 狂気のファントマ·マークIII) | October 9, 1978 |
Fujiko is taken hostage in exchange for the world's largest ruby, which Lupin recently acquired from the royal house of India. The one making the demand is Fantoma Mark III, grandson of the mysterious European master thief and disguise artist, Fantoma. He intends to use the ruby as the oscillation unit of a laser satellite, with which he will melt the Antarctic ice, thus sinking the world's major cities, and enabling him to conquer the world. Lupin's attitude is, how dare you think of using my ruby and Fujiko for something like that! Can Lupin figure out how to swim in space?
| 54 | 3 | "Detective Hanshichi – The Tenth-Year Engagement" / "Mercy Mercy Me"; Transliteration: "Hanshichi Keiji Juunen no Yakusoku" (Japanese: 半七刑事十年目の約束) | October 16, 1978 |
The aging detective Mikawa Hanshichi is treated as a nuisance at the downtown police station where he is assigned, but to Zenigata he is a great and respected elder. At this time, in celebration of the founding of Asakusa Temple, a golden statuette of Kannon, long since hidden away, will go on display, and Lupin, setting his sights on it, sends word of his intended coming. Hanshichi, who experienced trouble with Lupin ten years before, is determined that this time for sure he will match wits, with a great arrest taking place on the roof of Asakusa Temple. It's official business!
| 55 | 4 | "Mysterious Gang of Five [Part 1]" / "Kooky Kabuki – Part One"; Transliteration: "Hanafubuki Nazo no Goninshuu "Zempen"" (Japanese: 花吹雪 謎の五人衆"前篇") | October 23, 1978 |
Lupin and company acquire the 36 Views of Mt. Fuji from an exhibition hall in SHinjuku. A group calling themselves the "Shiragami Five" bar their way. As a tryout, they steal just one of the 36 Views, indicating that they will come for the others at another time. Lupin deposits them in his electronically-locked vault, and prepares for attack. But Fujiko is captured, and even Goemon sides with the Five. What will happen?!
| 56 | 5 | "Mysterious Gang of Five [Part 2]" / "Kooky Kabuki – Part Two"; Transliteration: "Hanafubuki Nazo no Goninshuu "Koohen"" (Japanese: 花吹雪 謎の五人衆"後篇") | October 30, 1978 |
Goemon challenges Lupin to a one-on-one duel, in order that they may at last fight their decisive battle. Lupin is caught on the point of his sword. Taking advantage of this opening, the Five take the 36 Views, but one of their members, Benten Kikuko, escapes, telling Goemon she wants to show the Views to her gravely ill father. When Goemon discovers that he's been deceived, he bares his neck to Lupin. Where are the 36 Views? If groups of five are the rule, then who's the lead for our side?!
| 57 | 6 | "Computer or Lupin?" / "Alter-Ego Maniac"; Transliteration: "Computer ka Lupin ka" (Japanese: コンピューターかルパンか) | November 6, 1978 |
The one and only supposedly perfect safe in the world is housed inside a VTOL aircraft. And it is guarded by a supposedly almighty defense computer, programmed with all of Lupin's data, making it Professor Hunter's masterpiece. On a sudden impulse, Old Man Zenigata steals one of the throwing coins of his great Edo-period ancestor, Zenigata Heiji, and ends up carrying out a strange team-up operation with Lupin to put it back again. Is it possible to escape from an infinite maze?
| 58 | 7 | "The Face of Goodbye at the National Border" / "Gettin' Jigen with It"; Transliteration: "Kokkyoo wa Wakare no Kao" (Japanese: 国境は別れの顔) | November 13, 1978 |
The target is the Aurora Drop, a diamond adorning a ballerina's forehead. A special remote-control operation nets the diamond easily enough, but a wounded Jigen is rescued by said ballerina, Monika, and ends up helping her put her desire to defect into action. With fake passports declaring them husband and wife, the two of them head for the border. The only way to escape the Communist Bloc is to smash through the checkpoint. I pay my debts, Monika!
| 59 | 8 | "The Mysterious World of Madame X" / "Madame Prefers Them Hand-Dipped"; Transliteration: "Madame X no Fushigina Sekai" (Japanese: マダムXの不思議な世界) | November 20, 1978 |
Having yet again shaken off Zenigata's pursuit, Lupin finds his way barred by a gigantic Fujiko. This device is the work of Madame X. Imprisoned in an old castle, he can do nothing as he is toyed with in the midst of mysterious phenomena. Madame X's hobby is collecting famous personages from around the world and turning them into living wax figures, and she means to add Lupin and company to her collection. How are illusions being worked?!
| 60 | 9 | "Suicide Flowers Bloom in India" / "Holy Cow"; Transliteration: "Indo ni Jisatsu no Hana ga Saku" (Japanese: インドに自殺の花が咲く) | November 27, 1978 |
The Suicide Ray Gun – once you're hit with it, it causes a sickness in which one wants to die as soon as possible. When the inventor of this weapon turns to evil, stopping it is no easy matter. Bandit leader Basara is the man with the gun, and he tries to wring out of Lupin the location of a diamond he's hidden in India. He even tries a fake Fujiko when all else fails to get Lupin to talk, but... What is the specific remedy for death-wish sickness?!
| 61 | 10 | "The Flying Zantetsuken" / "The Yam Is Mightier Than the Sword"; Transliteration: "Soratobu Zantetsuken" (Japanese: 空飛ぶ斬鉄剣) | December 4, 1978 |
When a gang boss and a death-dealing arms merchant join forces, nothing good is certain to come of it. They set their sights on Zantetsuken, which can cut even tanks in half, get Fujiko to steal it for them, and transform it into an invincible flying weapon of war. Meanwhile, Lupin and Jigen head to Central Africa to get Zantetsuken back for Goemon, whom they have left with Zenigata, as he is determined to die, seeing no other path for himself now that he has lost his warrior's soul. Does Zantetsuken have a weakness?!
| 62 | 11 | "The Sound of the Devil's Bell Calls Lupin" / "Church of the Poison Mind"; Transliteration: "Lupin o Yobu Akuma no Kane no Ne" (Japanese: ルパンを呼ぶ悪魔の鐘の音) | December 11, 1978 |
Lupin receives a letter from Jigen and Goemon asking for help. He heads for their location, but finds the men of Gemallschaft, this village which isn't to be found on any map, where the churchbells ring, living their lives under the guidance of Sister Labina. Jigen and Goemon seem to be different people. The secret is the sound of the bells. Labina is using mass hypnosis to turn the villagers into perfectly obedient soldiers, whom she then intends to sell. Jigen and Goemon close in on Lupin with intent to kill! Note The first Lupin the Third movie Mystery of Mamo premiered. Five days after this episode aired.
| 63 | 12 | "A Trap for a Trap!" / "Charity Begins at Home"; Transliteration: "Wana ni wa Wana o" (Japanese: 罠には罠を!) | December 18, 1978 |
Don Kecchi, the richest man in America, plans to donate all his wealth to charity. Lupin steals his money, and of all things shoots Fujiko right before Zenigata's eyes. But the real Lupin witnesses that Lupin's actions with his own eyes?! This is an act put on by Kecchi, who has learned that his illness was misdiagnosed, and decided that he wants his money back. The whole sequence was done with holograms. Who will end up with the 20,000,000,000,000¥?
| 64 | 13 | "Christmas is in the Goddess's Hands" / "Christmas at Tiffany's"; Transliteration: "Christmas wa Megami no Te ni" (Japanese: クリスマスは女神の手に) | December 25, 1978 |
Lupin and company are spending their Xmas vacation in New York, but Margaret who owns both Tiffany's and a TV station, hires them to rob the store on live TV. Even though they don't feel up to it, Fujiko ends up using the blank check provided as token of the agreement, and they're stuck with going through with it. With the eyes and ears of all America tuned in, the exciting stealing technique will be lure fishing for jewelry?!
| 65 | 14 | "Lupin's Enemy is Lupin" / "Return of the x Factor"; Transliteration: "Lupin no Teki wa Lupin" (Japanese: ルパンの敵はルパン) | January 8, 1979 |
"You are the only ones who can rescue our kidnapped Princess Yasmin!" Lupin and company are hired for the task by a small Silk Road country in exchange for all the holy curry they can eat. But this is in fact a trap set for Lupin. Within a fortress guarded by automatic missiles is Mister X, who looks exactly like Lupin. At the conclusion of a duel with water-sabers, which is the real one?!
| 66 | 15 | "Order: Shoot to Kill!!" / "Beauty and the Deceased"; Transliteration: "Shasatsu Meirei!!" (Japanese: 射殺命令!!) | January 15, 1979 |
Lupin tries to take it easy while Zenigata's away, but he suddenly finds himself being shot at. It's the coming of Beauty, who has accepted secret shooting orders from ICPO Headquarters. At the site where Lupin meets him for a one-on-one showdown, Lupin is blown away by Beauty's powerful Dum-Dum rounds, but gets away with his life thanks to Jigen's last-second save. When Jigen confronts Beauty to avenge Lupin, Lupin has only one handmade fulminate-of-mercury round for Jigen's gun!
| 67 | 16 | "Lupin's Great Journey to the West" / "Monkey King Business"; Transliteration: "Lupin no Daisaiyuuki" (Japanese: ルパンの大西遊記) | January 22, 1979 |
The mountain country of Kima, hidden away in Tibet, has mountains of treasure! On hearing this, Lupin and company head there. Though they infiltrate as a group of anthropological researchers, they are captured by Kinkaku and Ginkaku, the giants who rule the country, and ordered to fight each other as human playing pieces in a game of killer shogi. Jigen and Goemon are sucked into a gourd full of sulphuric acid. How will they get out of this pinch?!
| 68 | 17 | "Casino Island – Inversion After Inversion" / "Games of Chance"; Transliteration: "Casino Too – Gyakuten Mata Gyakuten" (Japanese: カジノ島·逆転また逆転) | January 29, 1979 |
Casino Paradise is an artificial island floating in New York Harbor. Domino, its operator, plans to use the $500,000,000 capital contained in the casino's three mobile safes to back his own run for president. Of the opinion that there is nothing he cannot steal, Lupin goes on a preliminary tour, and gets friendly with Nina, Domino's daughter. A big fan of Lupin's, she offers her assistance, but just then the artificial island is inverted through the strategy of Robert, Domino's campaign manager!
| 69 | 18 | "The Woman Pops Fell in Love With" / "Zenigata Getcha into My Life"; Transliteration: "Tottsan no Horeta Hito" (Japanese: とっつあんの惚れた女) | February 5, 1979 |
Political fixer Pomade Jors didn't trust anyone, so he implanted a miniature bomb inside the heart of his wife, Laura, and put all the scandal data he had acquired on political leaders of various countries into a special voice-activated safe. New York mafia boss Alec Cabane, having set his sights on that data, kills Pomade, steals the safe, and threatens Laura's life, because it is her voice that is the key to the safe. But if she speaks, and thus opens the safe, without her husband present to speak first and activate the safety mechanism, the bomb inside her heart will explode one minute later, with distance not a factor. Seeking help, Laura finds Zenigata, and they escape, their ongoing flight leading to love... Tragedy and confession come together!
| 70 | 19 | "A Classical Thief and a Myna" / "Can't Beat the Classics"; Transliteration: "Classic Doroboo to Kyukanchoo" (Japanese: クラシック泥棒と九官鳥) | February 12, 1979 |
Even though Zenigata comes raging up to FBI HQ, Lupin, Jigen, and Goemon are... clearly all in solitary confinement. This is actually all part of their plan, and they spring Clyde Barlow, an old man with the same name as the one-time machine-gun bandit. Then they get him to help in their attack on the trailer which the National Super Bank is using as temporary facilities while the main building is renovated. The old man's companion, Bonnie Parker, also signs on, and the activities of a mynah bird open the vault's door, but...?
| 71 | 20 | "Lupin vs. the Shinsengumi" / "Dangerous Dreamers"; Transliteration: "Lupin Tai Shinsengumi" (Japanese: ルパン対新選組) | February 19, 1979 |
Kondoo Isamu III, grandson of the leader of the Shinsen Group of Tokugawa loyalists who fought the New Meiji Government during the collapse of the Shogunate, hires Lupin and company to recover the legendary Golden Cannon, sunk by the Shogunate forces in the Tsugaru Strait "between Hokkaidoo and Honshuu", and which would be worth some 7-8,000,000,000¥ to collectors. The problem is the violent deep-sea current which protects the sunken vessel. A ringtoss catch project acquires the golden cannon, but afterwards a death struggle for possession takes place. Okida, controlling a monster squid, takes a do-or-die course of action, shouting that he will take his ancestors' legacy and make Hokkaidoo an independent country!!
| 72 | 21 | "A Skateboard Murder Mystery" / "You're Sapphired!"; Transliteration: "Skateboard Satsujin Jiken" (Japanese: スケートボード殺人事件) | February 26, 1979 |
The owner of the legendary sapphire, the Eye of Solomon, is Ellary Queen, who also owns the Red Eagles football team. Lupin, coming for the sapphire as he declared he would, retreats for the time being when he finds Queen near death. Someone has already attacked Queen, attempting to hand him. According to the deduction of Bolonco, son of Detective Lt. Columbo, the sapphire has not yet been stolen. Who really dunit?!
| 73 | 22 | "Through Flowers or Storms: The Thieves' Race" / "It's a Purloin-a-Palooza!"; Transliteration: "Hana mo Arashi mo Doroboo Race" (Japanese: 花も嵐も泥棒レース) | March 5, 1979 |
Lupin and Jigen are full of fighting spirit as they enter the final event of the Thieves' Olympics, the getaway race, beginning at Sooyamisaki, Japan's northernmost point, with the finish line at Japan's southernmost point, Sakurajima, Kyuushuu. If they win this event, they will be the greatest thieves in history. The only rule of the race is to win. How you do it doesn't matter. Getting past the strong American and Soviet teams, they move into a dead heat. But there is yet again a clear scent of conspiracy surrounding the proceedings. The sponsor of the event is Fantoma Mark III, hell-bent for revenge. Will the racetrack set as the goal be destroyed?!
| 74 | 23 | "Terror of the Chameleon Man" / "For Larva or Money"; Transliteration: "Kyoofuu no Chameleon Ningen" (Japanese: 恐怖のカメレオン人間) | March 12, 1979 |
The world's largest uncut diamond has been discovered in South Africa, and naturally Lupin goes there and gets it. Unable to cut the ore, no matter how he tries, he finally gets Goemon to do it. But this is part of the plan of the diamond concern, who have the cut diamond recovered by Guinness, the Chameleon Man. Guinness' special tank cannot be affected by ordinary bullets. This will require a round made from a diamond!
| 75 | 24 | "A Wedding Dress Doesn't Suit Fujiko" / "The Bride Came D.O.A"; Transliteration: "Fujiko ni Hanayome Ishoo wa Niawanai" (Japanese: 不二子に花嫁衣装はにあわない) | March 19, 1979 |
Unable to bear Fujiko getting married all in white, Lupin shoots her, then follows her by blowing himself up. But it's a trick. It's a big show, the purpose of which is to get the jewelry collection of Fujiko's would-be groom, Hafner. But Hafner is also a collector of brides, on a scale that would do justice to Bluebeard. Danger is closing in on Fujiko. Will Lupin arrive in time?!
| 76 | 25 | "Do You Know Shakespeare?" / "Dark Charade"; Transliteration: "Shakespeare o Shitteru kai" (Japanese: シェークスピアを知ってるかい) | March 26, 1979 |
Jigen heads for the African republic of Borodias, with Lupin and company in pursuit, when he receives a letter from Sister Angelica. Angelica wants his help in rescuing Dr. Othello, head of the country's independence movement. Once a member of a noble Venetian family, she devoted herself to this land ever since Jigen left her eight years ago, when she looked to God for help. But the whole thing is the conspiracy of a major world power, which is controlling the situation from behind the scenes. Why are Othello's eyes blue?
| 77 | 26 | "Arresting Lupin with Astrology" / "Lupin's Psychic Fiend"; Transliteration: "Hoshiuranai de Lupin o Taiho" (Japanese: 星占いでルパンを逮捕) | April 2, 1979 |
The Astrology Project: ICPO's special operation. Marianne, who can predict all of Lupin's actions via scrying with her crystal ball, is the opponent this time. The objective is Poseidon's Tear, an emerald which is the sign of the king of the country of Danmal. Goemon, charmed and mesmerized by a strange pigeon, tries to cut Lupin! Marianne wants the Emerald for herself. What is her gimmick?!
| 78 | 27 | "Diamonds Shining in the Robot's Eye" / "Ice, Robot"; Transliteration: "Robot no Me ni Dia ga Hikaru" (Japanese: ロボットの瞳にダイヤが光る) | April 9, 1979 |
A scientist who has no shortage of strange devices accidentally invents a robot that manufactures diamonds. Gavotte, a New York gangster, gets it to give to his girlfriend, Baby, but all they get out of it is ice. And thus follow a series of ridiculous failed exchanges surrounding the doctor and the robot, leading finally to a swap site at an amusement park. Can the robot be restored to its proper function?!
| 79 | 28 | "The Lupin Funeral March" / "Baton Death March"; Transliteration: "Lupin Soosookyoku" (Japanese: ルパン葬送曲) | April 16, 1979 |
Genius musician Kyoransky's conducting stick is conducting the music of Lupin's death. Those who hear the performance attack him. Lupin's target is also that diamond-studded conducting stick. Pretending to be a cameraman, Lupin records the orchestra on video, analyzes the orchestra recording, and solves the mystery: it's hypnosis, manifest through sound waves beyond the range of human hearing. When the moment of the showdown approaches, Lupin wields a soup ladle full of holes in his hand?! Note: This is the last episode of Lupin the Third Part II to be dubbed in English. Richard Epcar, the voice of Jigen revealed on Twitter that Geneon lost the license before they could dub the rest of the series.
| 80 | 29 | "The Last Gift in Prison is Cup Ramen" / "Everybody Loves Ramen"; Transliteration: "Saigo no Sashiire wa Cup Ramen" (Japanese: 最後の差し入れはカップラーメン) | April 23, 1979 |
Silver, who once worked with Lupin on a train robbery, stole the money himself, hid it somewhere, and promptly got himself thrown into prison on a rinky-dink charge. Lupin, having learned that Silver is about to be released, goes to the prison intent on making Silver tell what he did with the loot, only to discover that, while Silver was in prison, a new top-of-the-line prison was built over the site where he hid the money. Now, will the operation to trade an execution for the recovery of the money succeed?! Note: Despite being previewed at the end of episode 79 with the localized title "Everybody Loves Ramen", the English dub of all episodes from this point onward were never released because Geneon lost the license for the series.
| 81 | 30 | "Fujiko, Men Are a Sorry Lot!" / "Fujiko, Men Are a Sorry Lot!"; Transliteration: "Fujiko! Otoko wa Tsurai ze" (Japanese: 不二子!男はつらいぜ) | April 30, 1979 |
Lupin and company are after the Bell of the Duchy of Beltenberg, constructed in the 15th century. However, it's a fake, and it's being guarded by Zenigata. Angered at these various problems, Fujiko takes off for Paris, where she falls in love with, and becomes engaged to, Claude, heir to the duchy. She has a weakness for royalty, after all. But the aim of the rulers is to exchange Fujiko for discovery of the real bell.
| 82 | 31 | "Rescuing Pops" / "Hostage Rescue Operation: Daddio"; Transliteration: "Tottsan Hitojichi Kyuushutsu Sakusen" (Japanese: とっつあん人質救出作戦) | May 7, 1979 |
Zenigata is abducted from ICPO?! Terrorists demand the release of Napoleon XI from prison in exchange for their hostage. ICPO refuses to answer the demand because of concerns of face, but Zenigata's life is at stake. This is where Lupin comes in. But Napoleon XI is a narcoleptic, who can only stay awake for three hours a day. What will become of the Old Man's rescue?!
| 83 | 32 | "Lupin's Big Western" / "Lupin in the Wild West"; Transliteration: "Lupin no Daiseibugeki" (Japanese: ルパンの大西部劇) | May 14, 1979 |
Due to heavy competition in the hit-man industry, the Smith Gang's business results aren't good. So, at Fujiko's suggestion, they make a real-life film of killing Lupin, making it look like they're filming a Western. If they complete this commercial, it will be proof that they're No. 1 in the industry, and it will also make an excellent promotional piece as well! Lupin nonchalantly comes and goes on the set at Fujiko's invitation. Where is the love scene?!
| 84 | 33 | "Leave the Revenge to Lupin" / "Leave the Revenge to Lupin"; Transliteration: "Fukushuu wa Lupin ni Makasero" (Japanese: 復讐はルパンにまかせろ) | May 21, 1979 |
Joe Spade, once an expert gunman who taught Jigen how to shoot, unable to ward off the passing years, he has been cornered, and comes begging for help. Jigen, who takes debts very seriously, goes to Marseilles, but Joe is completely gone. The same gang which was after Joe is also after Lupin! There are also a string of jewel thefts using a telephotograph machine.
| 85 | 34 | "The ICPO's Secret Plan" / "The Secret Order of ICPO"; Transliteration: "ICPO Maruhi Shirei" (Japanese: ICPO㊙指令) | May 28, 1979 |
In order to make the dream of Maureen, daughter of a Mafia boss, come true in the brief time remaining to her, Stefan, her street-punk boyfriend, risks the showdown of his life. Lupin and company end up helping them out because Fujiko is moved by their plight, but it's all a secret ICPO project! Bureau chief Jasmine's strategy chases them all into a room with special mobile grating. Trouble!!
| 86 | 35 | "The Mysterious Nocturnal Mask" / "The Mysterious Nocturnal Mask"; Transliteration: "Nazo no Yakkoo Kamen Arawaru" (Japanese: 謎の夜光仮面現わる) | June 4, 1979 |
The true identity of Nightlight Mask, who killed the Duke of Le Mond and stole his opal, is Lupin! Working on the deduction of novelist Conan Dorill, the mystery man will appear at the costume ball, kill the daughter of Count Johannes and steal a second opal. An innocent Lupin is not at all satisfied. Professor Dolmen has the third opal. How will the revenge concealed within the ancient treasure of the Incas resolve itself?
| 87 | 36 | "When the Devil Calls to Lupin" / "When the Devil Calls to Lupin"; Transliteration: "Akuma ga Lupin o Maneku Toki" (Japanese: 悪魔がルパンを招くとき) | June 11, 1979 |
On a night of pouring rain, a doll in the shape of a small girl is delivered to Lupin's hideout, and manipulates Lupin into stealing the jewel known as the Phoenix's Tear. From the shadows, the villain Mephistopheles is pulling the strings. But when Lupin confront him he manipulates Lupin to show his power (he uses his powers to give Lupin pain by squeezing his heart via doll). The next objective is the Dragon's Tear, the Phoenix's Tear opposite. They are legacy of slain Jewish millionaire Jacob, and the true identity of the doll's controller is his son, Peter. The danger of a big explosion at a stadium, meant to kill former Nazis, is closing in!
| 88 | 37 | "Lupin's North Pole, South Pole Adventure" / "Lupin's North Pole, South Pole Adventures"; Transliteration: "Lupin no Nankyoku Hokkyoku Daibooken" (Japanese: ルパンの南極北極大冒険) | June 18, 1979 |
To steal the Nobel Prize, all you have to do is successfully carry out an experiment to move the penguins from the South Pole to the North Pole?! Lupin wastes no time in carrying out this plan, but this is in fact camouflage. His real objective is to take the Vatican Crown, placed at the North Pole as a prayer for peace. The penguins he brings with him confound both Fujiko and the underground organization known as the Red Voyagers League. So where is the crown?!
| 89 | 38 | "Play the Thief's Symphony" / "Play the Thief's Symphony"; Transliteration: "Doroboo Kookyookyoku o Narase" (Japanese: ドロボウ交響曲を鳴らせ) | June 25, 1979 |
Within the special vault of the World Crime Prevention Devices Association are drawings of all the world's safes. It's impregnable, with explosives rigged to go off at the slightest change in weight in its elevator, and a sound-gathering and detection system connected to a nuclear reactor. Lupin even retires to the mountains and devises a sound-dampening device, but is defeated by the sound of the device's own functioning. Surprise of surprises, what is the special vault's blind spot?
| 90 | 39 | "Bad Guys Make the Worst Crooks" / "The Badder A Guy, The More Villainous He Is"; Transliteration: "Warui Yatsu Hodo Daiakutoo" (Japanese: 悪い奴ほど大悪党) | July 2, 1979 |
Having a gun pointed at him in Harlem, Lupin makes the acquaintance of Chico, a street-smart kid. Even while Lupin plays tag with Zenigata, Chico can only think of making small change, but sucking up even such small pickings is Boss Markane. Lupin sneaks into Markane's party in order to expose Markane's hypocrisy, but becomes the target of the evening's entertainment: a game of murder. What the?!
| 91 | 40 | "The Time-Traveling Girl" / "The Time Traveling Girl"; Transliteration: "Toki o Kakeru Shoojo" (Japanese: 時を駆ける少女) | July 9, 1979 |
Lupin rescues a beautiful girl who has completely lost her memory. Learning that the key to her identity is in Persia, Lupin and company fly to Tehran, but through the machinations of Giranin's Red Spider Gang, who are after the girl, they end up being sentenced to beheading by the Iranian Army. The girl is in fact Ianne, daughter of Darius, king of ancient Persia. Will the "Eternal Rainbow," which only a hero may hold, disappear in a faraway whirlwind?
| 92 | 41 | "The Madam and the Robber's Quartet" / "The Merry Widow and the Robber's Quartette"; Transliteration: "Madame to Doroboo Quartet" (Japanese: マダムと泥棒四重奏) | July 16, 1979 |
Learning that the entire possessions of Piccolo, a man who taught Lupin about thievery when he was a young punk, have all been impounded by the police, Lupin and company go to see what they can do. Madame, his widow, knows nothing of her husband's true profession, believing him to be a musician, which means one big headache. The foursome are stuck with raiding the Liverpool Police Department while deceiving Madame with musical instruments at the same time.
| 93 | 42 | "Invading the Great Wall" / "Operation INVADER at the Great Wall of China"; Transliteration: "Banri no Choojoo Invader Sakusen" (Japanese: 万里の長城インベーダー作戦) | July 23, 1979 |
Lupin, Jigen, and Goemon steal the jade mah-jongg set which belonged to Emperor Shi, from the Peking Old Palace Museum. Even though he's kept his promise to get them for her, Fujiko won't marry him because he lacks intellect and refinement?! In that case, Lupin drinks the Confucian Analects, steeped in the Elixir of Learning, an ancient Chinese potion which enables one to absorb instantly the knowledge contained in any book which has been dissolved in the fluid. However, drinking the Analects transforms Lupin into a holy man, one who hates money and women. It's the conspiracy of Chang, a scientist turned gangster, who wants the mah-jongg tiles.
| 94 | 43 | "Lupin vs. Superman" / "Lupin Vs. Superman"; Transliteration: "Lupin tai Superman" (Japanese: ルパン対スーパーマン) | July 30, 1979 |
When Superman appears in the New York City sky, a bank robbery takes place nearby. Investigating together with Inspector McCleed, Zenigata suspects that it's Lupin's doing, but Lupin himself finds the notion simply ridiculous. Checking the banks which have been robbed, Lupin finds a small supermarket at the center of the ring they make. How will the showdown between Superman, Lupinman, and Fujikowoman end up?!
| 95 | 44 | "From the Ghost Ship with Love" / "From the Ghost Ship with Love"; Transliteration: "Yuureisen Yori Ai o Komete" (Japanese: 幽霊船より愛をこめて) | August 6, 1979 |
Lupin and Fujiko obtain the statuette known as the Stonechild from the Metropolitan Museum of Art, only to have their Cessna crash in the Bermuda Triangle, and run into a ghost ship. The ship's female captain, Jeanne, confronts Lupin, but it develops that there are three of these stone figurines: Lupin has one, Jeanne has another, and shipping tycoon Hees has the third. Who made them? Will the mystery of the century be answered at Stonehenge?!
| 96 | 45 | "Lupin's Gourmet World" / "Lupin's Gourmet World"; Transliteration: "Lupin no Oryoori Tengoku" (Japanese: ルパンのお料理天国) | August 13, 1979 |
There are any number of repulsive things to eat, but Baron Gourmel wants to eat Lupin's fresh brain. The promise of his diamond collection to whoever delivers it is irresistible to Fujiko. With Jigen, who likes pork and beans, and Goemon, with his three-minute soba noodles, mixed in for good measure, how will the sublime pie-throwing showdown with the army of cooks come out? Is Lupin's cooking any good...?!
| 97 | 46 | "Find Lupin the First's Treasure" / "Searching for Lupin I's Treasure"; Transliteration: "Lupin Issei no Hihoo o Sagase" (Japanese: ルパン一世の秘宝を探せ) | August 20, 1979 |
Within one of Lupin's back teeth, a piece of microfilm containing the location of the grave of Lupin I is concealed. Using a nude operation, Fujiko takes it, teams up with Holmes III, and together with three secret agents representing the U.S., Great Britain, and the U.S.S.R., they take to the sky in a gigantic hot-air balloon. Lupin, Jigen, and Goemon fight the secret weapons of the three agents, meant to eliminate interference, with the "Live Capture" technique"?!" taught to them the hard way by Zenigata. Where is the treasure? Who is the thief?
| 98 | 47 | "The Day Pops Was Gone" / "The Day Without Daddio"; Transliteration: "Tottsan no Inai Hi" (Japanese: 父っつあんのいない日) | August 27, 1979 |
Zenigata, barring Lupin's path today the same as he has every other day, is suddenly shot in the middle of his attempted arrest! Fujiko is burning with rage, but Paris Police Superintendent Truffaut, who has declared that the killer is Lupin, is himself suspicious. After an attempt to have Zenigata's corpse repatriated is thwarted by an attempt to steal the corpse en route to the airport, Truffaut opts to hold the funeral in Paris as a direct challenge to Lupin. Despite the tough security at the site of the funeral, Lupin and the gang are able to steal Zenigata's corpse from a flaming retort, but as they make off with it, it abruptly gets up?!
| 99 | 48 | "The Scattered Magnum" / "Fighting Jigen"; Transliteration: "Kooya ni Chitta Combat Magnum" (Japanese: 荒野に散ったコンバット·マグナム) | September 3, 1979 |
The loot this time is the single Hannibal coin, which is in the Duchy of Blanco. Hidden within it is the site where the hero Hannibal buried his war chest, but Jigen, who was late for a duel five years ago due to unavoidable circumstances, chooses instead the road that leads to the showdown with his enemy, Stoneman. The time for the border closing is near. When the duel begins, Jigen's Magnum isn't in his holster. What is Lupin up to?! Note: The episode is notable for being the first time any anime was broadcast in stereo. Certain later episodes were additionally aired in this format.
| 100 | 49 | "The Ultra Train Heist Plan" / "The Ultra Operation in the Train"; Transliteration: "Meiga Goodatsu Ultra Sakusen" (Japanese: 名画強奪ウルトラ作戦) | September 10, 1979 |
To cover the dinner bill for the President of France, an auction of artworks in storage at the Louvre is held, with an extemporaneous piece by Lupin I going on the block. It goes to Nai Baba, Arabian village chieftain and oil millionaire. It gets transported under heavy guard, but Zenigata knows that Lupin will try to take it. Fending off numerous sneak attacks, Zenigata finds himself the object of the chieftain's attentions"?". Will there be a final reversal?! Note: This episode was based upon a viewer's original idea during a studio-run contest as part of the series' 100th episode celebration.
| 101 | 50 | "Versailles, Burning with Love" / "Fervent Love at Versailles"; Transliteration: "Versailles wa Ai ni Moeta" (Japanese: ベルサイユは愛に燃えた) | September 17, 1979 |
The Black Lilly Party, obsessed with restoring the corrupt aristocracy without the monarchy, tries to get Lupin to find the phantom Crown of Marie Antoinette. On a hint from Oscar, the young, very attractive leader of the Black Lilly's Stormtroopers, Lupin removes the crown from a hidden compartment in a mirror at the palace of Versailles, but, breaking the promise of a 50/50 split, Oscar takes the crown and turns fugitive. What is Oscar's true identity? Note: This episode is a crossover with another TMS series, The Rose of Versailles, and was based upon a viewer's original idea during a studio-run contest as part of the series' 100th episode celebration.
| 102 | 51 | "Lupin, Do You Like Chanel?" / "Lupin, Do You Like Chanel?"; Transliteration: "Lupin wa Chanel ga Osuki" (Japanese: ルパンはシャネルがお好き) | September 24, 1979 |
Lupin is after the golden gun and diamond bullets that are the heirlooms of the House of Wilhelm, but upon learning that the current head of the house, Brillia, is a girl still in her teens, Lupin gives up. At the same time, a string of handgun thefts are taking place in London. The 99th gun stolen is Jigen's Magnum, and the 100th is Lupin's Walther P-38. Lupin fights Benkei's magnet-gun with a remote-controlled flying gun. The scent of Chanel fills the air. How does the vault containing the golden gun open? Note: This episode was based upon a viewer's original idea during a studio-run contest as part of the series' 100th episode celebration.
| 103 | 52 | "The Wolf Saw an Angel" / "The Wolf Looked at an Angel!"; Transliteration: "Ookami wa Tenshi o Mita" (Japanese: 狼は天使を見た) | October 1, 1979 |
The L.A. National Bank is hit with a rash of robberies, their objective being the World's Jewelry Fair exhibits being stored there. Lupin, of course, is also carrying out his own plan, an underground attack which is a smashing success. At the moment when he has acquired the valuable jewelry, Vietnam veteran Harry Satler strikes with heavy artillery. He needs money for the treatments his daughter's eyes require. The blind daughter, Mary, meets an angel in the badlands...! Note: This episode was based upon a viewer's original idea during a studio-run contest as part of the series' 100th episode celebration.
