= Lupin the 3rd Part II season 1 =

Lupin the 3rd Part II
- Season 1
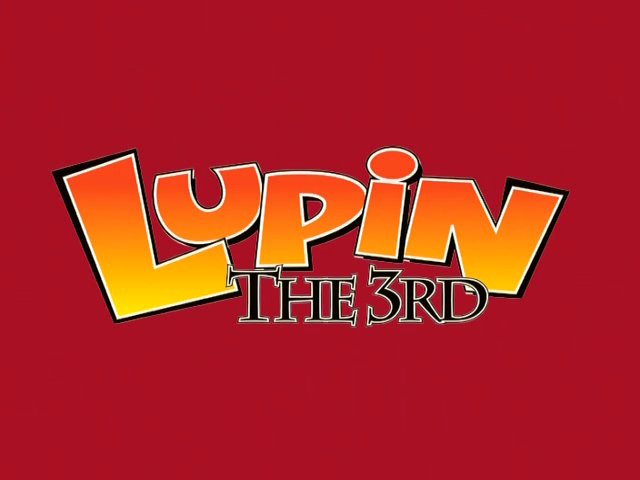
- Title card used in Pioneer Entertainment's English release
- No. of episodes: 26

Release
- Original network: NTV
- Original release: October 3, 1977 – April 3, 1978

Series chronology
- ← Previous; Part I: The Classic Adventures Next → Part II: Season 2

Lupin the 3rd Part II, also known as Shin Lupin III or simply as Lupin III for the American market, is a Japanese anime series based on the manga by Monkey Punch and is produced by Tokyo Movie Shinsha. The first season, which contains 26 episodes, aired between October 3, 1977, and April 3, 1978, on NTV. The opening theme is Lupin III Theme (ルパン三世のテーマ, Rupan Sansei no Tēma) by Yuji Ohno, while the ending theme is the instrumental version of Lupin III: Love Theme (ルパン三世 愛のテーマ, Rupan Sansei Ai no Tēma), also by Yuji Ohno. In the United States, twenty-six episodes of English adaptation of the series aired on Adult Swim starting on January 14, 2003, at midnight ET with the exception of episode 3, which was skipped due to its Nazi themes. In Canada, the entire first season of the series aired on G4techTV's Anime Current from May 7 to June 11, 2007.

== Episode list ==
No. overall	No. in season	Japanese translated title / English title (Note: "English titles" are those found on the Region 1 DVD release by Pioneer/Geneon Entertainment. Episodes 1–26 were broadcast on Adult Swim, with the exception of episode 3 which did not air due to its Nazi related themes.)	Directed by	Written by	Original release date	English air date
1	1	"Lupin the Third's Gallant Appearance" / "The Return of Lupin the 3rd" Transliteration: "Lupin Sansei Sassou Toujou" (Japanese: ルパン三世颯爽登場)	Kyosuke Mikuriya	Tadaaki Yamazaki	October 3, 1977	January 14, 2003 (Note: The Geneon English dub of Lupin the Third Part II episodes 1–2, 4–27 first aired in the United States on Adult Swim.)
After five years of working alone, Lupin III, Daisuke Jigen, Goemon Ishikawa, and Fujiko Mine receive invitations to a reunion abroad the luxury liner Sirloin. Jigen, Goemon and Fujiko think that Lupin sent the invitation, but Lupin says his invitation was sent by Fujiko. Inspector Zenigata shows up with an arrest warrant that Lupin points out to be fake. It turns out that all the invitations were sent by a villain known as Mister X, who first appeared in the first episode of the original television series.
2	2	"Wads of Bills Blossom in the Rio Sunset" / "Buns, Guns, and Fun in the Sun"; Transliteration: "Rio no Yuuhi ni Saku Satsutaba" (Japanese: リオの夕陽に咲く札束)	Kyosuke Mikuriya	Yoshio Takeuchi (Note: Credited as Mamoru Konno)	October 10, 1977	January 15, 2003
A Brazilian soccer team, the Santos Futebol Clube and the New York Cosmos from the USA (an actual team which in the late 70's managed to hire Pelé) square off at the world's largest sports arena, Rio de Janeiro's Stadium Maracanan. Lupin goes after the money from the ticket sales for the event. In order to have an alibi, Lupin, Jigen and Goemon get themselves arrested by crashing a truck into Christ the Redeemer. While in the jail's hospital, Fujiko helps Lupin and the others get out to steal the money and hide it inside the Christ the Redeemer statue.
3	3	"Hitler's Legacy" / "To Be or Nazi Be"; Transliteration: "Hitler no Isan" (Japanese: ヒトラーの遺産)	Kazunori Tanahashi	Yutaka Kaneko	October 17, 1977	May 9, 2007 (Note: The Geneon English dub of Lupin the Third Part II episodes 3, 28–52 aired in Canada on G4techTV. These episodes went unaired in the United States.)
Supposedly, an old man named Genhardt, who used to work for Hitler, knows the secret of the legacy of Hitler and is living on the other side of the Berlin Wall. After getting the old man across the Berlin Wall from East to West Germany, Lupin is unable to get the man to recall the location of the legacy. Lupin and the others plan a reenactment of the days of Hitler in order to get Genhardt to reveal the location of Hitler's Legacy. Note: This episode was not immediately broadcast in the U.S. nor included on the Volume 1 DVD release due to its controversial content. Instead, the episode was aired after the Season 1 finale, "The Rose and the Pistol," and later included on the Volume 5 DVD.
4	4	"I Can Hear Nessie's Singing" / "50 Ways to Leave Your 50-Foot Lover"; Transliteration: "Nessie no Uta ga Kikoeru" (Japanese: ネッシーの唄が聞こえる)	Kazunori Tanahashi	Atsushi Yamatoya	October 24, 1977	January 16, 2003
At Loch Ness, Scotland, the mysterious monster Nessie shows itself charmed by Fujiko's singing. Doctor Oz, seeing this, decides to use Fujiko to draw out Nessie so that he can capture it and show it all over the world. Dr. Oz's other motive is to get revenge on the monster for having bit off his leg many years ago. Lupin, Jigen and Goemon seek to help Fujiko and the Loch Ness Monster from Dr. Oz.
5	5	"I'll Teach You How to Transport Gold Bars" / "Gold Smuggling 101"; Transliteration: "Kinka no Hakobikata Oshiemasu" (Japanese: 塊の運び方教えます)	Kazunori Tanahashi	Noboru Shiroyama	October 31, 1977	January 17, 2003
Fujiko and a mystery man come bringing a request that Lupin steal a mountain of gold bullion from the Swiss Bank, which is renowned throughout the world for the strength of its security. After stealing the gold, Lupin and the gang melt it down and mold it to look like the body of a truck. They then paint the gold cast and replace an old truck body with it. After Lupin and the others get the car past the cops, Fujiko and the mysterious man betray Lupin and take the gold for themselves.
6	6	"Will the Leaning Tower of Pisa Be Standing?" / "Shaky Pisa"; Transliteration: "Pisa no Shatoo wa Tatteiru ka" (Japanese: ピサの斜塔は立っているか)	Kazunori Tanahashi	Yutaka Kaneko	November 7, 1977	January 21, 2003
Someone comes along and demands that the Italian government pay him a ransom if they don't want the Leaning Tower of Pisa destroyed by an earthquake. He has a device for generating artificial earthquakes that he plans to use. The government meets his demands, but Lupin has it in mind to take the money for himself. Zenigata chases Lupin into the enemy's lair, and, thinking that the Italian government defied his orders, the criminal hits the switch that activates the machine. Lupin tampers with the machine, however, and it explodes.
7	7	"Tutankhamen's 3000-Year-Old Curse" / "Cursed Case Scenario"; Transliteration: "Tutankhamen Sanzen no Noroi" (Japanese: ツタンカーメン三千年の呪い)	Kyosuke Mikuriya	Yutaka Kaneko	November 14, 1977	January 22, 2003
Lupin uses a balloon to boldly steal the solid-gold mask of Tutankhamen. But the instant he puts it on, what appears before his eyes is the world of the pharaohs, 3000 years ago. It seems that the mask is cursed and the only way to break the pharaoh's curse is to put the mask back where it came from. Jigen, Goemon and Fujiko plan to help out Lupin by returning the mask for him.
8	8	"Venetian Super Express" / "Disorient Express"; Transliteration: "Venicia Chootokkyuu" (Japanese: ベネチア超特急)	Kyosuke Mikuriya	Yoshio Takeuchi	November 21, 1977	January 23, 2003
The Trans-Europe Super Express is transporting a racehorse from Italy to France. But the collected valuables of crime boss Don Marcino is also aboard that train. His true objective is to get his ill-gotten gains out of the country. Lupin goes after the treasures of Don Marcino.
9	9	"Would You Like Ukiyo-e Blues?" / "Now Museum, Now You Don't"; Transliteration: "Ukiyo-E Blues wa Ikaga" (Japanese: 浮世絵ブルースはいかが)	Kyosuke Mikuriya	Hideo Takayashiki (Note: Credited as Ran Mouri)	November 28, 1977	January 24, 2003
An old man Lupin meets by chance turns out to be the grandson of ukiyo-e master Tōshūsai Sharaku. To test his own skill, he has been switching his own works for Sharaku's originals, but suffered a heart attack just as he was about to make the last switch. Fujiko, who has been helping the old man, asks Lupin to make the last switch for him.
10	10	"Steal the File M123" / "ZenigataCon"; Transliteration: "File M123 o Nusume" (Japanese: ファイルM123を盗め)	Kazunori Tanahashi	Noboru Shiroyama	December 5, 1977	January 28, 2003
At the invitation of Marcel, a young noble of Paris's jetset, Lupin escorts Fujiko to a party. But this is a trap set by Marcel, who has another face. He takes Fujiko hostage, straps a timebomb belt around Lupin's waist, and tells him to steal a certain criminal list from Scotland Yard before time runs out.
11	11	"Bet on the Monaco Grand Prix" / "Who's Vroomin' Who?"; Transliteration: "Monaco GP ni Kakero" (Japanese: モナコGPに賭けろ)	Kyosuke Mikuriya	Yoshio Takeuchi	December 12, 1977	January 29, 2003
Lupin has come to Monaco to race in the Grand Prix. Beforehand, when he goes to the casino to try his luck, he loses all his money, even his Formula One car. It turns out that he was set up by a fixer as part of a conspiracy aimed at the race, which involves forcing Lupin to race for the mob boss responsible for the set up because if Lupin wins, then everyone who bets on Lupin wins a lot of money since all the other are expected to bet against him.
12	12	"A Gift for the President" / "The Sleight Before Christmas"; Transliteration: "Daitooryoo e no Okurimono" (Japanese: 大統領への贈り物)	Kazunori Tanahashi	Noboru Shiroyama	December 19, 1977	January 30, 2003
The last bottle of Bordeaux wine which Napoleon had made for Josephine is going to be given to the President of the United States as a Christmas present. Lupin and company head to Bordeaux in order to claim it for themselves, but are chased off by gunfire from Zenigata. Their next attempt is the secret hijacking of the Concorde transporting the bottle over the Atlantic Ocean. After Lupin tricks Zenigata into thinking that the plane is actually flying, he steals the bottle of wine and replaces it with a fake. After, Lupin and the gang celebrate by tasting the old wine, which had spoiled.
13	13	"The Great Chase in San Francisco" / "I Left My Mind in San Francisco"; Transliteration: "San Francisco Daitsuiseki" (Japanese: サンフランシスコ大追跡)	Kyosuke Mikuriya	Yutaka Kaneko	December 26, 1977	January 31, 2003
Zenigata has been suffering from a persecution complex, one in which he feels certain Lupin is watching him. He seeks the help of psychiatrists to get rid of his delusions of Lupin. Meanwhile, some group has implanted microfilm containing a process developed by NASA for creating artificial diamond in one of Zenigata's back teeth. Lupin goes up against that group and attempts to take the microfilm for himself. Note: The scene when Zenigata runs away from Lupin's plane could be considered as a possible homage to Alfred Hitchcock's classic thriller film North by Northwest.
14	14	"Big Adventure of the Caribbean Sea" / "Curse of the Jumbo Juju"; Transliteration: "Carib no Daibooken" (Japanese: カリブ海の大冒険)	Kyosuke Mikuriya	Tadaaki Yamazaki	January 9, 1978	February 4, 2003
Forward Hees, the world's richest man, dies a mysterious death. Fujiko receives a large ruby in his will, but she too is attacked by a flock of black birds. The ruby was stolen from a temple of a cult located in the Caribbean. In order to save Fujiko from a mysterious fever, Lupin and company head there to return the ruby but are attacked by black magic zombies.
15	15	"Renowned Detectives in the Sky" / "The Case of the Risible Dirigible"; Transliteration: "Meitantei Sora o Yuku" (Japanese: 名探偵空をゆく)	Kyosuke Mikuriya	Yutaka Kaneko	January 16, 1978	February 5, 2003
Count Gabriel challenges Lupin to steal Dracula's Tear, the world's best-known carbuncle, from on board his airship, the Hendenburg, with Holmes III, Detective Archer, Kaneda Koojisuke, and Inspector Zenigata in attendance. Lupin must complete the task before the airship lands at an airport where the police are waiting for him.
16	16	"Two-Faced Lupin" / "Crude Reproduction, Perfect Frame"; Transliteration: "Futatsu no Kao no Lupin" (Japanese: 二つの顔のルパン)	Kyosuke Mikuriya	Yuu Tagami	January 23, 1978	February 6, 2003
Lupin seems to suffer from transformation sickness, in which one changes into another, cruel personality, and commits crimes repeatedly, but has absolutely no memory of what happened during that time. After numerous crimes not worthy of the name of Lupin, the man himself, having completely lost his self-confidence, even contemplates taking his own life, in his depression, but due to various factors, cannot succeed at dying. It turns out that someone disguised as Lupin has been committing the crime and conspiring with a doctor to trick the real Lupin into believing that he is suffering from transformation sickness.
17	17	"Target the Oil Dollars" / "Sheik-Down"; Transliteration: "Oildollar o Nerae" (Japanese: オイルダラーを狙え)	Kyosuke Mikuriya	Yuu Tagami	January 30, 1978	February 7, 2003
A blackmail notice is delivered to a small Arab country threatening to destroy the oil fields if the country does not pay $100,000,000. Lupin and company set their sights on the payoff money, but according to intelligence agent Hassan, the enemy is apparently using human bombs. The gimmick is a remote-controlled capsule bomb implanted in the person's stomach. In fact, Hassan himself is the enemy leader, Lawrence III, the grandson of Lawrence of Arabia. Fujiko conspires with Lupin to trick Lawrence III into revealing his true identity to his league of loyal followers.
18	18	"Black Panther" / "My Birthday Pursuit"; Transliteration: "Black Panther" (Japanese: ブラック·パンサー)	Kyosuke Mikuriya	Yutaka Kaneko	February 6, 1978	May 20, 2003
The Black Panther is a one-of-a-kind emerald. When light shines on it from a certain angle, a black panther appears to be hidden inside it. Lupin steals the gem, planning to give it to Fujiko for her birthday, and hides it temporarily in the museum in order to evade a body check by the strict security cordon, planning to come back for it later. But when both Zenigata and Inspector Conaiseau get involved as well, the statue where the emerald is hidden gets accidentally transported to a nude resort where Lupin, Jigen and Goemon attempt to retrieve it. Spoof: to The Pink Panther
19	19	"Can the 10-Year Vault Be Broken?" / "A Safe Bet"; Transliteration: "Juunen Kinko wa Yabureru ka" (Japanese: 十年金庫は破れるか)	Kyosuke Mikuriya	Noboru Shiroyama	February 13, 1978	May 21, 2003
Having returned to Japan after an extended absence, Lupin challenges the Marukin line of safes, renowned for being absolutely unbreakable, and cracks them at every turn. Having completely lost confidence in himself, Marukin experiences the grief of bankruptcy. As far as Lupin is concerned, it's his natural ability at work, but Marukin's son, Tetsutaroo, challenges him in his father's place. Giving Lupin poison, he forces him to accept the challenge of opening the safe he built himself, which contains the antidote for the poison, but the safe does not have a lock, door, or combination.
20	20	"Cornered Lupin" / "Hell Toupee"; Transliteration: "Oitsumerareta Lupin" (Japanese: 追いつめられたルパン)	Kyosuke Mikuriya	Shunichirō Koyama Shōichirō Ōkubo	February 20, 1978	May 22, 2003
Setting his sights on the large medallion on Generalissimo Hutler's chest, which contains a 50-carat ruby, Lupin should have been able to take it easily enough, using his special rod-and-reel technique, but ends up exposing the Generalissimo's secret toupee instead when the wind blows the hook on his fishing line over Hutler's head instead of the jewel. The infuriated Hutler orders that Lupin and company be wiped out, and in the face of the attack by his combined armed forces, a wounded Lupin makes his stand in an old castle with Fujiko while Jigen and Goemon attempt to save them. Note: The overall episode takes obvious inspiration from Charlie Chaplin's 1940 comedy film The Great Dictator, particularly with the scene of Hutler tossing a globe-shaped balloon in the air. Hutler himself is based upon Chaplin's character Hynkel, who in turn was an exaggerated parody of Adolf Hitler.
21	21	"Goemon's Revenge" / "The Last Mastery"; Transliteration: "Goemon no Fukushuu" (Japanese: 五ェ門の復讐)	Kyosuke Mikuriya	Sarada Oil	February 27, 1978	May 23, 2003
Goemon returns to Iga after ten years, only to find his master, Jinen, near death. Before dying, Jinen tells Goemon that his junior disciple, Hissatsu Jinkuroo, stole half of the Scroll of the Secrets of the Iga Ninja, which contains a map showing the location of the Treasure of Iga. He also gives Goemon the remaining portion of the scroll, with the rest of the map. Jinkuroo, knowing that he doesn't stand a chance in a straight-on fight against Goemon, boldly has himself arrested, hoping to be put in prison, and thus beyond Goemon's reach. Lupin helps Goemon by getting Jinkuroo out of jail and setting up a head-to-head fight between Goemon and Jinkuroo.
22	22	"Explore the Mysterious Women's Palace" / "Lupin in Paradise"; Transliteration: "Nazo no Nyoonin Yakata o Sagure" (Japanese: 謎の女人館を探れ)	Kyosuke Mikuriya	Noboru Shiroyama	March 6, 1978	May 27, 2003
Lupin and Jigen hear of an amazing treasure in a remote area, and go after it. Upon saving a woman being attacked by ruffians, the place she leads them to, by way of thanks, is a paradise on earth, with good-looking women everywhere. Lupin accepts the thanks, completely forgetting about the treasure. The fact is, this mansion full of women is for the purpose of seducing men, and then exposing them to an aging gas. Zenigata falls for the same trick as well, and he ends up inside the mansion alongside Lupin. Jigen gives up on trying to get Lupin's mind back on the treasure and leaves, but then realizes the secret of the mansion and enlists Goemon's help in saving Lupin. Meanwhile, Fujiko, who is also after the treasure of the mansion, ends up trapped inside, as well. Note: This episode takes its plot from chapter 4 of the second manga series, Lupin III – World's Most Wanted.
23	23	"A Witch in the Fourth Dimension" / "Auntie Ballistic"; Transliteration: "Daiyojigen no Majo" (Japanese: 第4次元の魔女)	Kyosuke Mikuriya	Atsushi Yamatoya	March 13, 1978	May 28, 2003
Lupin is feeling out of sorts, because lately he hasn't been able to get a hold of Fujiko. When he receives a phone call saying that she'll marry him if he passes her test, he takes off, but what he finds waiting for him is Fujiko's aunt, Mine Bujiko. The test is, either find Rommel's Gold, or pay for failing to do so with his life. Lupin throws himself into deciphering ancient hieroglyphics and almost gives up, but Fujiko's holographic image keeps him going. After unlocking the secret of the hieroglyphics, Lupin discovers that Bujiko is actually Fujiko in disguise. Note: This episode shares continuity with Episode 7 "Tutankhamen's 3000-year Curse." It also references the 1941 film noir The Maltese Falcon.
24	24	"The Phantom Thief Rat Boy Appears!" / "Rats to You"; Transliteration: "Kaitoo Nezumi-Koozoo Arawaru" (Japanese: 怪盗ねずみ小僧現わる)	Kyosuke Mikuriya	Kiyoshi Miyata	March 20, 1978	May 29, 2003
Appearing on a moonlit night, the figure in black who refers to Goemon as "the Thirteenth", calls himself "Nezumi-Koozoo IV." He informs Goemon that their ancestors teamed up in the International Thieves' Championship, but were defeated in competition by the original Arsène Lupin, and that they should team up to avenge this dishonor. The objective is top-secret data being kept under guard at Sakurada Police Station. Goemon and Nezumi split up, mounting a two-front offensive against Zenigata, who is reinforcing security.
25	25	"Encounter With the Deadly Iron Lizard" / "The Lair of the Land-Shark"; Transliteration: "Hissatsu Tokage Kenzan" (Japanese: 必殺鉄トカゲ見参)	Kyosuke Mikuriya	Noboru Shiroyama	March 27, 1978	May 30, 2003
There is a prison from which, it is said, no one attempts to escape. The reason is that the prison is guarded by Iron Lizards, which are self-propelled bombs that pursue people anywhere, based on genetic data stored in a computer. Lupin and company learn that Fujiko is inside held by the warden, who wants to have sex with her. In order to save her, Lupin, Jigen and Goemon get inside the prison, but end up captured by the warden who enters their genetic data into the Iron Lizards.
26	26	"A Rose and a Pistol" / "Shot Through the Heart"; Transliteration: "Bara to Pistol" (Japanese: バラとピストル)	Kyosuke Mikuriya	Atsushi Yamatoya	April 3, 1978	June 3, 2003
Zenigata heads to Spain after learning that Lupin is there. Meanwhile, Lupin and Jigen are in a Barcelona bar where a dancer catches the eye of Jigen. The woman works for Meyer, who, having been beaten by Lupin a number of times, sets Lupin and Jigen up to kill each other off by of making them appear to be enemies in disguise to one another. Lupin and Jigen meet up for a shooting match in the dark, but a secret code between them that involves shots aimed at a coin alerts Lupin and Jigen to the fact that they're being tricked. Note: This episode makes extensive use of Georges Bizet's Carmen Suites.
