= Lupin the 3rd Part II season 4 =

Lupin the 3rd Part II
- Season 4
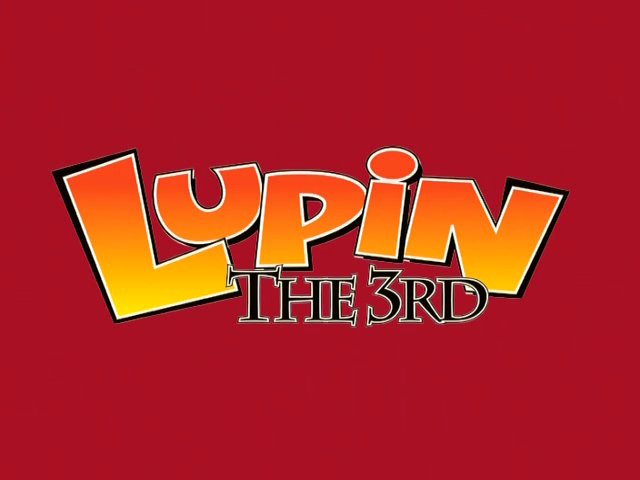
- Title card used in Pioneer Entertainment's English release
- No. of episodes: 52

Release
- Original network: NTV
- Original release: October 8, 1979 – October 6, 1980

Series chronology
- ← Previous; Part II: Season 3 Next → Part III: The Pink Jacket Adventures

Lupin the 3rd Part II, also known as Shin Lupin III or simply as Lupin III for the American market, is a Japanese anime series based on the manga by Monkey Punch and is produced by Tokyo Movie Shinsha. The fourth season, which contains 52 episodes, aired between October 8, 1979, and October 6, 1980, on NTV. Streamline Pictures released an English dub of episodes 145 and 155 to VHS in 1994 separately as Lupin III: Tales of the Wolf and together as Lupin III's Greatest Capers. Both were directed by Hayao Miyazaki and marked his final involvement with the franchise. The opening theme is "Lupin III '80" (ルパン三世'80) by Yuji Ohno while the ending theme is "Love Is Everything" by Noboru Kimura.

== Episode list ==
No. overall	No. in season	Japanese translated title / English title (Note: "English titles" are those found on the Crunchyroll streaming broadcast of the series, with alternate titles for episodes 145 and 155 coming from Streamline Pictures' VHS release of "Lupin III's Greatest Capers".)	Original release date
104	1	"The Most Dangerous Golden Bed" / "The Most Dangerous Golden Bed"; Transliteration: "Mottomo Kiken-na Oogon Bed" (Japanese: もっとも危険な黄金ベッド)	October 8, 1979
If you wonder why the golden bed in Texas millionaire Morgan's possession is said to be the most dangerous, it's because it's guarded by laser beams, immersed in a pool of high-strength sulfuric acid, and is shielded by a tank division and numerous other systems. Lupin can't back down from stealing it because Fujiko wants it for a love nest, so, on their third assault, Lupin, Jigen, and Goemon draw off the tanks and fighter planes, and attempts to use Morgan's own 45-inch gun himself. Now, how will he fare in the end?
105	2	"The Mystery of Demon's Head Island" / "The Mystery of Demon's Head Island"; Transliteration: "Kaiki Onikubitoo ni Onna ga Kieta" (Japanese: 怪奇鬼首島に女が消えた)	October 15, 1979
On Devil's Head Island, in the Seto Inland Sea, there is a legion of refugees from the Heike Clan. Gempaku, who wants to see his descendant, Motomaro, continue the family line, has tried all manner of methods, using the Forest of Disappearances as a cover, but Motomaro keeps stuffing and mounting the women Gempaku brings him. With treasure seeking Fujiko and Lupin, and Zenigata and Goroohachi, the patrol officer stationed on the island, who are in hot pursuit, getting all mixed in, the battle with the samurai army is a seesaw. Is there no escape from the heavy siege?!
106	3	"You're the Cat, I'm the Fish" / "A Cat for You! Dried Bonito for Me!"; Transliteration: "Kima wa Neko Boku wa Katsuobushi" (Japanese: 君はネコぼくはカツオ節)	October 22, 1979
Vivian wants to become a star so badly that she's even willing to become Lupin's victim if it'll make her famous, but a slip of the tongue causes her to say "Lupin stole a cat that eats pencil shavings." Lupin, infuriated at the grade-school newspaper report, begins a search for the cat in question, feeling disgraced at having been accused of stealing something so stupid. The duo of Bucky and Butcher also get mixed up in the proceedings. But does this cat really exist?
107	4	"The Curse of the Wedding Ring" / "The Wedding Ring is a Cursed Trap"; Transliteration: "Kekkon Yubiwa wa Noroi no Wana" (Japanese: 結婚指輪は呪いの罠)	October 29, 1979
What Fujiko has picked out for her wedding ring is the legendary Hope Diamond, said to cause all its possessors misfortune. During the taking of it from the Smithsonian Institution, Lupin suffers a multitude of bad luck and disasters. This diamond really is possessed by a demon. Even though they manage to hold the wedding, Fujiko transforms into an old woman! Will love's tenacity win out?! Whose face is that in the mirror?
108	5	"Zantetsuken's Lament" / "Iron Cutter Sword With Blues"; Transliteration: "Kanashimi no Zantetsuken" (Japanese: 哀しみの斬鉄剣)	November 5, 1979
Even on vacation, Goemon has eyes for nothing except swordsmanship. A girl named Naomi takes one of the iron bars Goemon had wrapped in bundles of straw for the purpose of cutting practice. Her grandfather is a swordsmith, and he wants very much to make a katana better than Zantetsuken. Naomi puts energy into her support of her grandfather, and they discover Zantetsuken's secret: the high temperature of its blade. Who holds the true legendary blade?!
109	6	"Lupin's Toughest Fight Ever" / "Lupin Only Lives Twice"; Transliteration: "Lupin Shijoo Saidai no Kusen" (Japanese: ルパン史上最大の苦戦)	November 12, 1979
Once again, Lupin's life is the object of a wager. If he wins, Fujiko will get a 5000-carat raw diamond. Lupin's opponent, chosen by Almighty, with whom Fujiko has her bet, is the high-speed killer, Tiger. He's enough of a marksman to hit Lupin in the forehead with a ketchup bullet. The showdown has begun, but is there some sort of trick to Tiger's ability to appear and disappear without warning? The showdown comes to a climax in the amusement park's house of mirrors!!
110	7	"Fujiko's Candid Photo" / "Sharp Shot! This is Fujiko"; Transliteration: "Gekisha Kore ga Fujiko da" (Japanese: 激写これが不二子だ)	November 19, 1979
A theft report is received from the police state of Malda. The investigation methods are much too harsh and unforgiving, considering that all that was stolen was one camera. Actually, this camera is the invention of the century: it can take pictures of the future. Thus, the hand of the state police closes in on Fujiko, who has been winning a string of large gambles. The excessively heavy-handed treatment pushes Zenigata past his limits. Against a robot adversary, will one police officer's fighting spirit do the job?!
111	8	"Is the Invaders Safe Open?" / "Enjoy the Invaders Game"; Transliteration: "Invader Kinko wa Hiraita ka?" (Japanese: インベーダー金庫は開いたか?)	November 26, 1979
While walking around New York City's downtown area, where Jigen grew up, Catherine, an old acquaintance who is now the widow of a diamond broker, issues a challenge: "Can you steal my jewelry?" Jigen goes, reluctantly, with Lupin and Goemon tagging along, but security is tighter than tight, and a half-baked effort will not suffice. The final Space Invader Safe is itself a major obstacle, but there is no time remaining to Catherine.
112	9	"Goemon's Close Call" / "Danger! Goemon"; Transliteration: "Goemon Kikiippatsu" (Japanese: 五ェ門危機一髪)	December 3, 1979
Through his own carelessness, Goemon is taken prisoner at a hot spring, and subjected to torture by the assassin team of Rose and Wolf. They want to kill Lupin, because that will make the best proof of them being the best in the world. To that end, they are attempting to make Goemon, as Lupin's associate, tell them Lupin's weakness. The torture gets intense, but Goemon doesn't tell them anything. At the very moment when things look their worst, Zantetsuken flashes!
113	10	"Operation Chushingura" / "OPERATION 'CHUSHINGURA"; Transliteration: "Sakusenna wa Chuushingura" (Japanese: 作戦名は忠臣蔵)	December 10, 1979
The chief of police is reprimanded for his laissez-faire attitude toward Lupin and dismissed from his post after assaulting the Prime Minister. Things having come to that point, the only way to restore his loss of face is to arrest Lupin! While the 47 top police officers are assembling, a strange old man asks Lupin to dig up the treasure of Kira Koozukenosuke from underneath the police station. The time is naturally a snowscape, and how will the showdown with Zenigata, in battle costume, turn out?! Note The second Lupin the Third movie Castle of Cagliostro premiered. Five days after this episode aired.
114	11	"The Secret of the First Supper" / "The Secret of the First Supper"; Transliteration: "Meiga Saisho no Banshoku no Himitsu" (Japanese: 迷画最初の晩餐の秘密)	December 17, 1979
For 2000 years, the clan of Juda Iscariot, betrayer of Jesus Christ, have searched for the whereabouts of Christ's legacy, but have been unable to solve the mystery. The current descendant, Nova, has succeeded in inventing an eye medicine that gives one the power to see through anything. She gives it to Zenigata and stirs him up by telling him that Lupin will only interfere with their getting married. Zenigata goes all out for love, but Nova's objective is the half of the mystery painting, "The First Supper, " painted by Christ, that is in Lupin's possession, having been stolen by Lupin I. The painting has a map concealed within it which shows the location of Christ's treasure. So, where is it, anyway?
115	12	"Mona Lisa Smiles Twice" / "Mona Lisa Smiles Twice"; Transliteration: "Mona Lisa wa Nido Warau" (Japanese: モナリザは二度微笑う)	December 24, 1979
The famous painting, "Mona Lisa," is going on a rare international exhibition. Zenigata shouts far and wide that Lupin will come for it. But Lupin has personal reasons in this case. The truth is that his ancestor once was stuck with a fake. The security system in the floor of the exhibition hall is tricky: unless one walks the correct pattern, it will promptly become a pit. There are any number of Mona Lisas. What of the "true" Mona Lisa?
116	13	"When's the 108th Bell?" / "Has the Bells Rung 108 Times?"; Transliteration: "108tsu no Kane wa Natta ka" (Japanese: 108つの鐘は鳴ったか)	December 31, 1979
As Lupin enters his own time of bad luck, in order to change his fate, he heads for Koohooji, in Kyooto, following the method explained in the time of the Three Kingdoms for evading such misfortune: stealing the Golden Treasure Ship of the Gods of Luck, from Mt. Hoorai. Both the chief of detectives, who receives Lupin's advance warning, and the Kyooto Mafia, send in men, and build up a desperate defense. And there is Antonio, out to avenge himself on Lupin and Jigen, who shot his ears off seven years before. While the temple bell rings out with its explanation of the carnal desires of mankind, Lupin's project starts!!
117	14	"The Bubble Gum Disguise Plan" / "The Strategy of the Chewing Gum Disguise"; Transliteration: "Chewing Gum Hensoo Sakusen" (Japanese: チューインガム変装作戦)	January 7, 1980
Lupin's friend Buckingham is always coming up with weird inventions. This time, he's come up with a bizarre type of chewing gum, one which enables one to disguise oneself on the spot. At the bar where they close the sale of the gum, Boss Gasper sets his sights on Lupin. he plans a wedding scam, wherein he has his girlfriend, a dancer named Amore, marry Lupin, after which he kills Lupin and takes his fortune. Gasper is the jealous type, and all hell breaks loose!!
118	15	"The Southern Cross Looked Like Diamonds" / "Diamonds in the Southern Cross"; Transliteration: "Minami Juujisei ga Dia ni Mieta" (Japanese: 南十字星がダイヤに見えた)	January 14, 1980
In the eastern part of Rabaul, which saw some of the heaviest fighting of the Second World War, lies a cross which marks the location of Captain Cook's treasure. Lupin and company, who've come looking for it, find themselves suddenly under air attack by Zero. They are rescued by a man called Samejima, but he takes Fujiko hostage in exchange for having them get the A-bomb away from the Zero. It seems it was a holdover from the Bikini Atoll testing days, but Sergeant Kimihiro of the Imperial Japanese Air Corps is guarding it with his life, recalling the ghosts of both the Japanese and American soldiers. It's an aircraft carrier vs. a Zero!
119	16	"Lupin, Who Killed Lupin" / "Lupin Kills Lupin"; Transliteration: "Lupin o Koroshita Lupin" (Japanese: ルパンを殺したルパン)	January 21, 1980
Fujiko dies in Lupin's arms. Lupin flips out, but it's all a put-up job: having heard, at the last, the location of Lupin's most precious treasure, Fujiko teams up with the villain Helgar. An extremely angry Lupin takes off after them, but an almighty Minotaur defense system awaits at the hiding place, on the island of Crete. Helgar himself developed this transforming weapon. What is Lupin's treasure?
120	17	"Frankenstein Attacks Lupin" / "Frankenstein Attacks Lupin"; Transliteration: "Frankenstein Lupin o Osou" (Japanese: フランケンシュタイン ルパンを襲う)	January 28, 1980
There is a gang who is swiping Lupin's intended targets right before his eyes. The Red Ghost gang uses a spirit gun to call forth a person's spirit, thus getting accurate information. To make it work, they need the body of one of that person's descendants. The next target is Goemon. The plan is to recover Frankenstein's soul, which was stolen by the original Goemon. Will the mightiest monster of all walk the earth again? What will happen to Goemon?!
121	18	"The Treasure My Grandfather Left Behind" / "A Treasure My Grandfather Left"; Transliteration: "Ore no Jiisan ga Nokoshita Takaramono" (Japanese: オレの爺さんが残した宝物)	February 4, 1980
The Opal Venus, a statue which Lupin's grandfather, Arsène Lupin, stole from the Palace of Elysees. According to an old document found in Arsène Lupin's silk top hat, Lupin left it with Gregoire, the No. 2 great thief of the time. Lupin's feeling is, if my grandfather left it, I'll go get it back. So saying, he and his friends get as far as Gregoire's castle, but there is one way to get across the garden which the Venus is decorating, and thus collect it!
122	19	"Rare Find: Napoleon's Fortune" / "An Unusual End to an Expedition for Napoleon’s Treasure"; Transliteration: "Chinhakken Napoleon no Zaihoo" (Japanese: 珍発見ナポレオンの財宝)	February 11, 1980
The pie-throwing gun with which the head of the ECC personally supplies Zenigata is a special weapon: it immobilizes opponents with its adhesive pies. Fujiko and Lupin are arrested in rapid succession, but the ECC head's objective is unexpected. He forces them to solve the mystery of Napoleon's Fortune, by threatening them with guillotining in Tahiti. The clue is a single Elmeth scarf. Just as they solve it, they find their existences on the verge of death!
123	20	"Paris Is for Thieves" / "Robbery in Paris"; Transliteration: "Doroboo wa Pari de" (Japanese: 泥棒はパリで)	February 18, 1980
Fracois [sic], a nuisance of a little girl, has fallen for Lupin, even going so far as to place an advance-warning message on his behalf in the newspaper. She wants Lupin to replace the real Oppenheim Rose, a ruby which her father, a jewelry appraiser, switched with a fake. But he's up against the Louvre's maximum security unit. The girl is determined to succeed somehow, but Lupin takes her to school. What will happen tomorrow?
124	21	"1999: A Popcorn Odyssey" / "Nineteen Ninety Nine Popcorn Trip"; Transliteration: "1999nen Popcorn no Tabi" (Japanese: 1999年ポップコーンの旅)	February 25, 1980
A romantic night means a flight to the Moon. For Fujiko, who tells him she wants to take a flight to the Moon, Lupin decides to borrow the mass-popcorn-producing machine developed by Professor Pancho. NASA, however, doesn't buy it, because their prestige will be ruined if it is shown that the Moon can be reached that easily, and take the Professor and his wife into custody, in an attempt to stop the launch. After various events, the countdown begins at last.
125	22	"The Big Oildollar Plot" / "The Scheme for Oil Dollars"; Transliteration: "Oildollar no Daibooryaku" (Japanese: オイルダラーの大謀略)	March 3, 1980
In exchange for Fujiko's life, Lupin steals a crown from a fountain of concentrated sulfuric acid. This is actually a test of skill: the real objective is to show snow to Princess Guiana, of the country of Iraran. The little princess doesn't have long to live. The only way to make snow fall in the desert is to acquire the Snow Cannon from Spinar, the world's most powerful secret society.
126	23	"Together with Lupin to Hell" / "Take Lupin All The Way to Hell"; Transliteration: "Jigoku e Lupin o Michizure" (Japanese: 地獄へルパンを道づれ)	March 10, 1980
Lady Black, who wants for nothing in life, makes a certain wager with Fujiko, who believes in Lupin's immortality. If Lupin can get out alive from a maze equipped with killing devices, she will give Fujiko her fine art collection. All manner of traps attack Lupin and Jigen. Black has a secret.
127	24	"Direct Hit! Operation Dead Ball" / "The Direct Attack! Dead Ball Strategy"; Transliteration: "Chokugeki! Deadball Sakusen" (Japanese: 直撃!デッドボール作戦)	March 17, 1980
Lupin and company took the complete take of a gambling casino, a little while ago. Boss Largo comes up with the most powerful group of killers in order to get it back. He hypnotizes a big-league baseball team, implanting a suggestion that they pitch and hit at Lupin, who has a tootache, whenever he puts his hand to his cheek. The pain of a cavity cannot be withstood.
128	25	"The Old Woman and Lupin Thievery Contest" / "Lupin and An Old Woman's Scheme"; Transliteration: "Rooba to Lupin no Doroboo Kassen" (Japanese: 老婆とルパンの泥棒合戦)	March 24, 1980
There is a reward of $1,000,000 for Lupin's arrest. This in itself is not unusual, but when a newspaper reports of Lupin's crimes before they happen, something is definitely not right. The way Old Lady Dokonjo, who publishes a small newspaper all by herself, figures it, scoops are the only way to increase sales. Lupin and company fall for her tearful pleas, but her son, Benson, is a sinister character. It's a motorcycle showdown!!
129	26	"In Jigen, I Saw the Gentleness of a Man's Soul" / "The Kindness Of Jigen is Seen"; Transliteration: "Jigen ni Otokogokoro no Yasashisa o MIta" (Japanese: 次元に男心の優しさを見た)	March 31, 1980
Jigen has gone on his own ahead of Lupin to Janaika, which is on the verge of revolution. There, he rescues Sandra, who tried to sneak into the Presidential Palace by herself. Sandra is the daughter of the former president, and was trying to liberate a rare painting, a keepsake of her father, from the palace, so that she cen be married with Guyler, head of the freedom fighters. "The Naked Venus" is suspended in midair, protected by a special system. Jigen, who learns the deactivation method, cuts through the battlefield, and heads for the palace, alone!
130	27	"Lupin Vs. the Mystery Man with Two Faces" / "Lupin vs The Man of Two Faces"; Transliteration: "Lupin tai Kaijin Nimensoo" (Japanese: ルパン対奇人二面相)	April 7, 1980
A strange meeting is taking place at the atelier of surrealist artist Daré. Inspector Magrey is saying that he will recover what Lupin has stolen. Having no idea what awaits him, Lupin nonchalantly shows up, only to be put to sleep, and then locked in a smokehouse by Inspector Magrey, who is actually Daré. He says that Lupin is indeed the ultimate(?!) in source material for a work of art.
131	28	"Two Goemons - the Mystery of Zantetsuken" / "The Secret of Goemon's Zantetsu Sword"; Transliteration: "Futari Goemon - Zantetsuken no Nazo" (Japanese: 二人五ェ門斬鉄剣の謎)	April 14, 1980
A nationwide warrant is out for Goemon, who not only robbed a bank but also stabbed a security guard to death. The Zantetsuken in Goemon's hand has none of the blood-clouding on the blade that would indicate stabbing a person. This is the work of Goemon's archenemy, Nidaemon. There are two Zantetsukens, a male and a female variety. According to tradition, unless the two blades lay together once every 300 years, the larger, male blade will lose its potency. This time is Midnight straight up.
132	29	"The Himalayan Holy Mountain Thieves' Cult" / "The Himalayan Thief Group"; Transliteration: "Reizan Himalaya no Doroboo Kyoodan" (Japanese: 霊山ヒマラヤの泥棒教団)	April 21, 1980
The holy ground is in the middle of the roof of the world. Discarding the fat that is the common world's wealth, believers who appeal to Guru Fandar can disappear from this world, and be given a new life in Utopia. "Don't be ridiculous." As it turns out that amongst the believers is a man who stole Lupin's 30,000 bills of Napoleon currency, Lupin goes out to expose the scam. But when the disguise at which he is so good is uncovered, things get bad!!
133	30	"Keep Your Hands Off the Hot Treasure" / "Don't Steal the Hot Treasure"; Transliteration: "Atsui Otakara ni Te o Dasu na" (Japanese: 熱いお宝に手を出すな)	April 28, 1980
Lupin's date while Fujiko is away is Claudia. Lupin's objective is the gold and silver fortune placed in the mouth of the 100-year Volcano, on Cleo Island. Once every 100 years, the volcano stops erupting, for only 30 minutes. Jigen and Goemon, accepting Claudia's pleas not to steal that which supports the spirit of the natives, attempt to stop Lupin.
134	31	"The Climactic Lupin Arrest Operation" / "The Surrounded Summit Strategy"; Transliteration: "Lupin Taihoo Choojoo Sakusen" (Japanese: ルパン逮捕頂上作戦)	May 5, 1980
The Kimberly Diamonds, which take up a full half of the diamonds traded annually worldwide, are worth a good $30,000,000,000. Lupin's dream is to claim those diamonds and make them into a diamond carriage for his honeymoon with Fujiko, but Zenigata isn't so naive as that. Lupin and company's crash-landed transport plane is fully surrounded by policemen from all over the world, gathered together and mobilized by a call from the UN! Will a shot from a giant crossbow made on the spot succeed in snatching victory from the jaws of defeat?!
135	32	"Poison and Magic and Lupin III" / "The Poison Trio"; Transliteration: "Dokuyaku to Majutsu to Lupin Sansei" (Japanese: 毒薬と魔術とルパン三世)	May 12, 1980
The spinster Lucrezia, last of the notorious Borgia clan, who used poison as a favorite means of murder, is in prison. Lupin and company, asked by her nephew Galdan to spring her, get themselves arrested and thrown in jail, and free her, bed and all. But Galdan was actually after Lucrezia's life, and getting her out was so that he could make her confess where the clan's jewels have been hidden. With the Old Man strangely mixed in, what will be the resolution?
136	33	"Revenge of the Gold Butterfly" / "The Golden Butterfly takes Revenge"; Transliteration: "Gold Butterfly no Fukushuu" (Japanese: ゴールドバタフライの復讐)	May 19, 1980
Lupin and company pull off a string of bank robberies in one evening, but Lupin's objective is to buy the only Great Golden Swallowtail Butterfly in captivity at auction. This butterfly has the ability to detect gold veins. Maniak, winner of the auction, leads an armed troop who destroy the environment in their search for gold. Their acts of trampling the butterfly paradise under their feet is unbearable. Will nature be avenged against such brutality? The butterflies' eyes light up.
137	34	"The Magnificent Team-Play Operation" / "Team Work"; Transliteration: "Kareinaru Teamplay Sakusen" (Japanese: 華麗なるチームプレイ作戦)	May 26, 1980
The Museum of Jewelry is holding a special exhibition of the diamond known as "Cleopatra's Tear." Lupin quickly makes a preliminary inspection, but with Zenigata showing up yet again, he has to run away. This was a planned appointment, so that he could hear from Zenigata the date and time of the diamond's delivery to the exhibition hall. Afterwards, Lupin and company conduct special blindfolded training in order to carry out their plan. The chance will only be for a few seconds, in pitch darkness. In that time, the four of them must successfully carry out a sequential, collaborative play, but will their labors bear fruit?
138	35	"The Treasure of Pompeii and Venomous Snakes" / "Pompeii's Secret and the Treasure"; Transliteration: "Pompeii no Hihoo to Dokuhebi" (Japanese: ポンペイの秘宝と毒蛇)	June 2, 1980
The Treasure of Pompeii has lain forever untouched because it is guarded by countless venomous snakes deep inside a convent. Lupin acquires an antivenom set from the Red Cross, and promptly makes his own attempt on the treasure. Lucia, a girl who has numerous loves for a nun, plots to take the treasure for herself while helping Lupin. She wants to be happy, you see. What is the treasure, really?
139	36	"Steal Everything of Lupin's" / "Steal Everything from Lupin"; Transliteration: "Lupin no Subete o Nusume" (Japanese: ルパンのすべてを盗め)	June 9, 1980
Even for truly wealthy men, the greatest wish in life is to once again acquire a youthful body. Mister Steel has chosen Lupin III as the destination body for his brain transplant. The procurer is, of course, Fujiko. After a faked traffic accident, Lupin is borne to Steel's mansion, where the brain transplant takes place successfully. The old man has only a little time left, but the brain is Lupin's. How will the brain shuffle resolve itself?
140	37	"Wolf, Run, Pig, Fall Down" / "The Wolf Runs and the Pig Rolls"; Transliteration: "Ookami wa Hashire Buta wa Korogare" (Japanese: 狼は走れ豚は転がれ)	June 16, 1980
At an auction held by Whitney, owner of a diamond mine, the items scheduled for bidding are stolen by mice and king salmon! Lupin, sensing that there is more to this than meets the eye, follows the salmon, who are migrating via their homing instinct, and ends up in Canada. Whitney, a connoisseur of food, has been using a clever method of circulating his diamonds so that his mine never runs dry.
141	38	"1980 Moscow Revelation" / "Apocalypse of Moscow 1980"; Transliteration: "1980 Moskwa Mokushiroku" (Japanese: 1980モスクワ黙示録)	June 30, 1980
On the night before the Moscow Olympics, Zenigata is called to the Kremlin to safeguard a chandelier hanging from its ceiling, a chandelier made up entirely of over 3,000,000 diamonds. It's a special creation, with all the diamonds strung together on a single string. Lupin learns of its design from the engineer who made it, while they are locked up in adjoining cells, and mounts a raingutter operation to steal it, under cover of repairing it, disguised as the engineer. The diamonds fly through the air as the gun salute goes off!
142	39	"The Big Favorite Disappeared at the Grand Race" / "The Disappearing Favourite"; Transliteration: "The Big Favorite Disappeared at the Grand Race" (Japanese: グランドレース消えた大本命)	July 7, 1980
Enraged at the hypocritical courtesy of English Lord Weather, Lupin accepts a bet over whether he can steal the Lord's horse, Red Arrow. Though he makes attempts while the horse is in transit, and during the hunt, the Lord's counterstrategies are scrupulous, leaving no opening. Lupin makes an impossible announcement: "I will take the horse in the middle of the Grand National Race, before a full crowd in the stands!" In a jumping accident, only the horse disappears?!
143	40	"The Miami Bank Raid Anniversary" / "The Miami Bank"; Transliteration: "Miami Ginkoo Shuugeki Kinembi" (Japanese: マイアミ銀行襲撃記念日)	July 14, 1980
Lupin and company are taking a summer vacation on Miami Beach. Suddenly, a helicopter appears in the sky overhead, its passenger shouting something about Lupin having placed a call saying that he was going to raid Miami Bank. After that comes a phone call asking them to raid the bank, adding the strange proviso that if they do, then Miami Bank will join the ranks of the country's best. So, Lupin agrees, for the moment. Though he takes a shot at cracking the vault, it turns out to be empty. The bank becomes very famous for not having had a single cent stolen. And they plan to hold an anniversary celebration next year on the same date?!
144	41	"Fujiko's Close Call Rescue Operation" / "Hair breadth rescue operation for Fujiko"; Transliteration: "Fujiko Kikiippatsu Kyuushutsu Sakusen" (Japanese: 不二子危機一髪救出作戦)	July 21, 1980
Lupin is attacked by the brothers Nanja-Monja while waiting for Fujiko to come over so they can celebrate her birthday party, which he has made all the preparations for. They have kidnapped Fujiko and made her the prize inside the Lucky Safe on display at the stadium of the tourist country of Karchina. The only way to release her is for Lupin himself to be the key, accepting certain death by electrocution in exchange for Fujiko's freedom. Brushing aside Jigen and Goemon's hands, Lupin charges forth: "I love you..."
145	42	"Wings of Death - Albatross" / "Albatross: Wings of Death" (Streamline) "Wings of Death, Albatross" (Crunchyroll); Transliteration: "Shi no Tsubasa Albatross" (Japanese: 死の翼アルバトロス)	July 28, 1980
Just when Lupin, Jigen, and Goemon wonder what she's called them for, Fujiko shows up, kicks their sukiyaki, has a firefight, and leaves them a present: the detonator plug to a pint-sized A-bomb. An aircraft museum which is restoring old aircraft is merely a cover: in fact, it's a flying merchant of death, with an A-bomb manufacturing plant housed in its wings. The head man, Lonebach, tries to seduce Fujiko by telling her that he will make her his first wife. Will Lupin let him get away with it?! A big aerial battle begins!! Note: This episode was directed by Hayao Miyazaki under the pseudonym Teruki Tsutomu. It was later dubbed into English and released on VHS along with episode 155 "Farewell, My Beloved Lupin" (which Miyazaki also directed).
146	43	"Lupin's Splendid Failure" / "Lupin is Defeated"; Transliteration: "Lupin Kareinaru Haiboku" (Japanese: ルパン華麗なる敗北)	August 4, 1980
Even though Fujiko says, which of you can capture my heart? Lupin's heart just isn't in it when he finds out his opponent is an eight-year-old kid. Romanov is a boy genius, made so with drugs. In any case, the duel to see which of them can gather the most money before sunset is a draw. The next showdown is to see who can get the largest diamond. Romanov, who is in poor physical condition, is determined to prove his intellect. Who has the smartest brain in the world?
147	44	"The Mermaid That Disappeared in the Midnight Sun" / "The Mermaid That Disappear in the Midnight Sun"; Transliteration: "Byakuya ni Kieta Ningyo" (Japanese: 白夜に消えた人魚)	August 11, 1980
Fujiko, wearing not a stitch of clothing, is the model for a statue of a mermaid, carved from quartz crystal. With a heave, a pile of bills are laid before the sculptor, Vingel, by the mayor of a town who says he wants to make the mermaid into a tourist attraction, and Vingel sells it to him. When Fujiko cries to Lupin to get it back, he makes his entrance. The boxcar of the transport train carrying the statue has a special coupling mechanism, and stealing it will require a little engineering. Lupin's fanciful notion is a cold and clear one!
148	45	"The Target Is 555 Meters" / "The Target is Five Hundred and Fifty Five Meters Away"; Transliteration: "Target wa 555 M" (Japanese: ターゲットは555M)	August 18, 1980
The Marine Tower Observation Room, where this year's diamond auction is to be held, is a safe room floating in midair, accessible only by a single see-through elevator. Range: 555 meters. The success or failure of this job depends on Jigen's precision long-range marksmanship. Jigen, Lupin, and Goemon assume their various positions, and Jigen suddenly remembers a prize he failed to get in a shooting contest, for lack of one more bullet. It was a French doll. Shot!
149	46	"The Treasure of Mecca Wore a Veil" / "Mecca Robbery"; Transliteration: "Veil o Haida Mecca no Hihoo" (Japanese: ベールをはいだメッカの秘宝)	August 25, 1980
The treasure of the prophet Mahomet is held in the Islam holy city of Mecca. Patra Lawrence, daughter of Lawrence of Arabia, is guarding it as head of mosque security, because if she does, she will be accepted as a Moslem. It's secured in a vault operated by crude oil pressure. So long as the crude oil pressure does not drop, the vault cannot be opened. Fujiko is nowhere to be seen, but when Lupin concludes from the arrangement of the Earth's tectonic plates that drilling a new well at the South Pole should do the trick, he finds a trap awaiting his swift attack!!
150	47	"Piano Symphony "Zoo"" / "Piano Symphony "Zoo""; Transliteration: "Piano Kookyookyoku "Doobutsuen"" (Japanese: ピアノ交響曲「動物園」)	September 1, 1980
Genius pianist and defector Keransky performed on a legendary Jovich Grand Piano, in a concert hall of his own design. The hall was built around the piano; thus its entrance is too small for the piano. Also, the hall has the newest anti-theft devices, and is guarded by a squad of snipers. "If it won't come out, we'll just bring it out"?! This showdown has reversals!
151	48	"The Arrest Lupin Highway Operation" / "To Arrest Lupin, the Mission at Highway"; Transliteration: "Lupin Taiho Highway Sakusen" (Japanese: ルパン逮捕ハイウェイ作戦)	September 8, 1980
The operation this time is to take an entire shipment of South African diamonds, but oddly enough, the Old Man is calm and relaxed. He lets Lupin and company escape, at one point, taking Fujiko prisoner, but so long as he has the highway collapse machine devised by the combined leading-edge scientific resources of ICPO, he radiates confidence in each and every direction he gives. This serves to give Lupin a bad feeling, but oh well. The decisive point has almost arrived. Now!!
152	49	"Jigen and a Hat and a Pistol" / "Jigen and The Hatless Pistol"; Transliteration: "Jigen to Booshi to Kenjuu to" (Japanese: 次元と帽子と拳銃と)	September 15, 1980
The president of a large trading company declares in his will, "I will give $10,000,000,000 to whoever is the best in the world with a pistol." Vice-president Don Hagero hires expert marksman Minnesota Fats to eliminate all of the competition, in order to ensure that no one else will get the fortune. His final target is Jigen. Fats, learning Jigen's secret, burns all of Jigen's hats, and challenges him with his special cuestick ricochet gun. Jigen can't sight without his hat. It's the ultimate pinch!
153	50	"The Bills That Came from God" / "Money from Heaven"; Transliteration: "Kamisama no Kureta Satsutaba" (Japanese: 神様のくれた札束)	September 22, 1980
Once a year, ICPO takes the money they've collected from criminals all over the world to a Swiss bank, where they make an accounting. This year, Zenigata is given the task of escorting the money, which makes taking it like candy from a baby to Lupin. He acquires it easily enough, but all those bills are a major obstacle to getting away. Just then, they spot Sister Joanna's church, in need of renovation... Oh, a miraculous rain falls in the Alps.
154	51	"The Hexagon's Great Legacy" / "Hexagon's Fabulous Legacy"; Transliteration: "Hexagon no Ooinaru Isan" (Japanese: ヘクサゴンの大いなる遺産)	September 29, 1980
Within Raika Bank, inside the Grand Hexagon, lies Nazi gold on a scale that would make the world tremble if it knew. The bank itself uses a construction of stacks of gold bullion, and has an alarm system that goes off if even one bar is missing. Fifty tons of gold bullion. If we can't have any missing, then we'll just add on. Shall we go for it? Within a defense net reminiscent of the war, the exchange bullion for bricks operation begins!!
155	52	"Farewell My Beloved Lupin" / "Aloha Lupin" (Streamline) "Thieves Love the Peace" (Crunchyroll); Transliteration: "Saraba Itoshiki Lupin yo" (Japanese: さらば愛しきルパンよ)	October 6, 1980
An armored robot flying through the skies of 1981 Tokyo raids a jewelry store, demonstrating truly amazing capabilities, and disappearing no one knows where. Lupin's announcement is, what's strange about me using a robot like this? The operator, Maki Oyamada, is cooperating in order to show what a dangerous weapon this robot is, but the truth is, the whole thing is a conspiracy. Thieves love peace! Note: This episode was directed by Hayao Miyazaki under the pseudonym Teruki Tsutomu and is currently the last Lupin III-related project that he ever had involvement with. It was later dubbed into English and released on VHS along with episode 145 "Wings of Death - Albatross" (which Miyazaki also directed).
