= Lupin the 3rd Part II season 2 =

Lupin the 3rd Part II
- Season 2
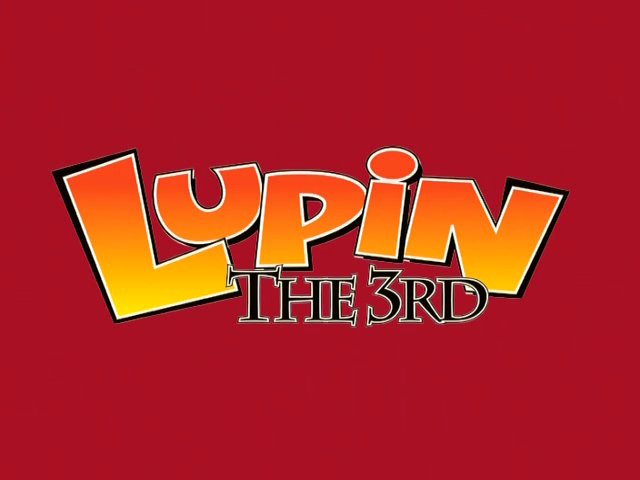
- Title card used in Pioneer Entertainment's English release
- No. of episodes: 25

Release
- Original network: NTV
- Original release: April 10 – September 25, 1978

Season chronology
- ← Previous; Season 1 Next → Season 3

Lupin the 3rd Part II, also known as Shin Lupin III or simply as Lupin III for the American market, is a Japanese anime series based on the manga by Monkey Punch and is produced by Tokyo Movie Shinsha. The second season, which contains 25 episodes aired between April 10, 1978, and September 25, 1978, on NTV. The opening theme is "Lupin III Theme (Vocal Version)" (ルパン三世のテーマ（ヴォーカル・ヴァージョン）) by Peatmac Junior while the ending theme is "Lupin III: Love Theme (Vocal Version)" (ルパン三世 愛のテーマ（ヴォーカル・ヴァージョン）) by Ichirou Mizuki. Only the first episode of second season's English adaptation aired on Adult Swim on June 4, 2003, due to it being a replacement for episode 3, which the network skipped due to its Nazism content. In Canada, the entire second season of the series aired on G4techTV's Anime Current from June 12 to July 16, 2007.

== Episode list ==
No. overall	No. in season	Japanese translated title / English title (Note: "English titles" are those found on the Region 1 DVD release by Pioneer/Geneon Entertainment. Episodes 27 was broadcast on Adult Swim as a replacement of episode 3 from Season 1, which did not air due to its Nazi related themes.)	Directed by	Written by	Original release date	English air date
27	1	"Where Did the Cinderella Stamp Go?" / "The Little Princess of Darkness"; Transliteration: "Cinderella no Kitte wa Doko e Itta" (Japanese: シンデレラの切手はどこへいった)	Kyosuke Mikuriya	Yutaka Kaneko	April 10, 1978	June 4, 2003
The Cinderella Shadow is a stamp which is said to possess the magical power of making its owner into a princess. Lupin casually steals it from the hall where it is being exhibited, but a girl named Alice also wants the stamp. Not only is she quite persistent, she is smart as well, and tries her best to get the stamp. At the finish of the psychedelic chase through a Disney-esque amusement park, where has the Cinderella Stamp gone? Note: This episode takes inspiration from Lewis Carol's classic novel Alice in Wonderland.
28	2	"Female Detective Melon" / "Revenge of La Nerd"; Transliteration: "Onna Deka Melon" (Japanese: 女刑事メロン)	Kyosuke Mikuriya	Yutaka Kaneko	April 17, 1978	June 13, 2007
In response to a notice from Lupin stating that he will take the money from every bank in Paris, Melon, a female detective and the granddaughter of Inspector Garimard [sic], rival of the original Arsène Lupin, is selected to replace Zenigata. The sea of bills gathered and stored in the underground police morgue is guarded by a special lock, whose switch is in the Superintendent-General's office. Melon's cold beauty shines in the Metro!
29	3	"Electric Pigeon Tactics" / "Fry Me to the Moon"; Transliteration: "Dengeki Hatapoppo Sakusen" (Japanese: 電撃ハトポッポ作戦)	Kyosuke Mikuriya	Atsushi Yamatoya	April 24, 1978	June 14, 2007
The great thief Lupin III has numerous secret techniques, one of which is the Mid-air Float Technique. The Syndicate uses a dirty method to get their hands on it. Using a fake Lupin and Jigen, they torture X8 excruciatingly, filling him with the desire for revenge, and then send him against the real Lupin and Jigen. Lupin, knowing of this plot, fixes a keepsake of X8's mother, in order to prove that he's being framed, but... What is a man's tenacity?
30	4	"The Wind in Morocco is Hot" / "Morocco Horror Picture Show"; Transliteration: "Morocco no Kaze wa Atsuku" (Japanese: モロッコの風は熱く)	Kyosuke Mikuriya	Noboru Shiroyama	May 1, 1978	June 15, 2007
In Morocco, Lupin is attracted to a beautiful girl. Suddenly, he finds himself kidnapped and stuffed in a bag. he is taken to a desert encampment, where he is forcibly conscripted into the Foreign Legion. However, what should come spilling out of the bag next to his but Old Man Zenigata! Despite their protests, the two of them are shackled together by the neck, and their escape takes a twisted path. Which of them will be free?!
31	5	"Shoot Into the Midnight Sun" / "Twins Pique"; Transliteration: "Byakuya ni Mukatte Ute" (Japanese: 白夜に向かって撃て)	Kyosuke Mikuriya	Atsushi Yamatoya	May 8, 1978	June 18, 2007
The sun doesn't set during summer in Stockholm. There, two beautiful twins, Latica and Anita, are fighting a repeated deathmatch. The reason is the location of the Viking treasure which is concealed on their backs. Lupin, playing two different roles, manages to photograph the map on both their backs, which only appears during the Summer Solstice, but the map has an additional secret!
32	6	"Lupin Dies Twice" / "Lupin the Interred"; Transliteration: "Lupin wa Nido Shinu" (Japanese: ルパンは二度死ぬ)	Kyosuke Mikuriya	Atsushi Yamatoya	May 15, 1978	June 19, 2007
Zenigata is at the wheel of a patrol car. Sitting next to him is, of all people, Fujiko. She believes that the best way to protect Lupin from the high-speed hitman Puma is for him to be arrested by the police. Lupin answers Puma's ability to hit at long range, in the midst of rain and hail, goes out for a one-on-one showdown, and gets shot! Will the repose of poor Lupin's soul go with his love for Fujiko?
33	7	"To Whom Orion's Crown Belongs" / "A Rumble Royale"; Transliteration: "Orion no Ookan wa Dare o Mono" (Japanese: オリオンの王冠は誰のもの)	Kyosuke Mikuriya	Mon Shichijō	May 22, 1978	June 20, 2007
A stolen crown goes to auction by a secret route. Jigen is with the seller, Jaguar, Goemon is with the buyer, Tatsumaki, and Lupin is in disguise as the jewelry appraiser. Their objective in sneaking in is to get both the crown and the money used to purchase it. It's a four-way tug-of-war with Lupin, the Jaguar gang, the Tatsumaki gang, and even Zenigata getting in on the act! And lest we forget, an upset by Fujiko. What effect will that have on the outcome?!
34	8	"Lupin Who Turned Into a Vampire" / "But your Brother was Such a Nice Guy"; Transliteration: "Kyuuketsuki ni Natta Lupin" (Japanese: 吸血鬼になったルパン)	Kyosuke Mikuriya	Kiyoshi Miyata	May 29, 1978	June 21, 2007
Heburai Village, Japan - a place where, according to legend, Jesus Christ was washed ashore. In an excavated casket, a beautiful woman is found in a near-death state, together with a golden statuette of the Virgin Mary. Lupin goes after the statuette, but the woman, Camilla, revives, and brings Lupin into her circle of vampire acquaintances. She is Christ's twin sister, and she stole the statuette from her brother and fled. Will Fujiko be rescued from sacrifice at the ball 2000 years later?!
35	9	"Pursue the Gorilla Gang" / "Gorilla Tactics"; Transliteration: "Gorilla Gang o Okkakero" (Japanese: ゴリラギャングを追っかけろ)	Kyosuke Mikuriya	Mon Shichijō	June 5, 1978	June 22, 2007
A black pearl on which Lupin has set his sights is stolen just ahead of him by... a gang of three gorillas?! What would gorillas want with jewels? Lupin thinks, while setting up a decoy plan. When the gorillas next appear, they take both the jewels he set out from them, and Fujiko as well. This scene smells of a put-up job... That guardian of justice, Zenigata, doesn't give up either!
36	10	"Uncover the Secret of Tsukikage Castle" / "The Riddle of Tsukikage Castle"; Transliteration: "Tsukikagejoo no Himitsu o Abake" (Japanese: 月影城の秘密をあばけ)	Kyosuke Mikuriya	Mon Shichijō	June 12, 1978	June 25, 2007
This job, oddly enough, is at Goemon's request. The will of an old man, Kuranari, says that whoever solves the "mystery" and finds his inheritance can have it. Lupin takes the challenge of deciphering the code. But the Fuma Ninja are also plotting to take the treasure for themselves. The end of the battle over the mystery culminates on the roof of the castle tower. Where is the legendary sword, Tsukikagemaru?! Note: This episode marks the first appearance of the Fuma Clan, whom would later have a more expanded role in the Lupin III original video animation, The Fuma Conspiracy.
37	11	"The Hidden Gold of Genghis Khan" / "Khan Job"; Transliteration: "Genghis Khan no Maizookin" (Japanese: ジンギスカンの埋蔵金)	Kyosuke Mikuriya	Kiyoshi Miyata	June 19, 1978	June 26, 2007
To steal the twin Golden Lions told of in the clan of Nariyoshi Shiase, Lupin and Jigen head for Mongolia. The real objective is the map concealed in the statue, which will lead them to the buried treasure of Genghis Khan. meanwhile, Fujiko, in search of Minamoto Yoshitsune's treasure, meets up with Goemon at Hiraizumi, Iwate Prefecture, where he is visiting his ancestor's grave. The two threads are brought together at Ryuujinnuma "Dragon God Swamp", and where is the treasure...?
38	12	"The Sweet Trap of ICPO" / "Happy Betrayals to You"; Transliteration: "ICPO no Amai Wana" (Japanese: ICPOの甘い罠)	Kyosuke Mikuriya	Yutaka Kaneko	June 26, 1978	June 27, 2007
Zenigata's successor as head of the Lupin detail is, surprise of surprises, Lupin's own supposed companion, Fujiko. She has taken on the task of arresting Lupin in exchange for the ICPO bureau chief, who is less concerned with appearances than with actually arresting Lupin, erasing her criminal record. Facing the woman who knows all about him, Lupin finally finds himself on his way to a special prison cell. Is this the end for Lupin at last...?
39	13	"Diamonds Disappeared Under the Hong Kong Sky" / "Pretty Cluckin' Insane"; Transliteration: "Hong Kong no Yozora ni Daia wa Kieta" (Japanese: 香港の夜空にダイヤは消えた)	Kyosuke Mikuriya	Yoshio Takeuchi (Note: Credited as Mamoru Konno)	July 3, 1978	June 28, 2007
Lupin and Jigen search a smuggler's ship disguised as police officials, but find only thousands of chickens, not the diamonds they expected. Even though they infiltrate Dragonbaum Garden, lair of the smuggling boss, Kou Chin Ko, they can't find hide or hair of the diamonds, which are being sold undercover of a martial-arts tournament. What will the chickens lay for Kou's favorite egg dinner?
40	14	"Operation Missile-Jack" / "Payload"; Transliteration: "Misslejack Sakusen" (Japanese: ミサイルジャック作戦)	Yasumi Mikamoto	Hideo Takayashiki (Note: Credited as Ran Mouri)	July 10, 1978	June 29, 2007
The first attempt on a shipment of Costa Rican diamonds "worth some 9,000,000,000¥ at the time" fails when the captured case is found to contain Zenigata instead. Word is that the diamonds will be transported to their destination, Puerto Rico, by missile. If Lupin loses it, it will be a blow to his reputation. The decision is made to attack the missile at the midpoint of its trajectory, but in order for this to succeed, it is necessary to get the precise launch time. What will the combination play produce?
41	15	"Search for the Treasure of Princess Kaguya" / "Heroes and Vixens"; Transliteration: "Kaguyahime no Takara o Sagase" (Japanese: かぐや姫の宝を探せ)	Yasumi Mikamoto	Kiyoshi Miyata	July 17, 1978	July 2, 2007
Kaguya, a beautiful young woman, asks for some strange items: from Lupin, the tears of the Yeti; from Jigen, a mermaid's scales; and from Goemon, the liver of a dragon. And she does so one at a time, all at Monaco. When the three of them return from their various adventures, the three items are combined with an elixir made of pollen from flowers from all over the world. Thus, they discover that the result is a mysterious potion. Will the sleeping prince awaken?!
42	16	"Lupin Has Become a Bride" / "Crusin' in Drag"; Transliteration: "Hanayome ni Natta Lupin" (Japanese: 花嫁になったルパン)	Yasumi Mikamoto	Hiroyasu Yamaura	July 24, 1978	July 3, 2007
The last voyage of shipping magnate Onabes's bachelorhood is an extravagant affair, with a ship full of beautiful women and first-class objets d'art. Lupin, knowing that Onabes has a villainous past, decides to give him a shock, by disguising himself as a shipwrecked woman"?!", and thus getting aboard his ship... a plan which works fine up to that point, but what should happen then but that Onabes falls in love at first sight with Lupin in his female disguise, and proposes!! Will wedding bells ring out at the church?!
43	17	"Where are the Peking Man's Bones" / "Jumpin' the Bones"; Transliteration: "Peking Genjin no Hone wa Doko ni" (Japanese: 北京原人の骨はどこに)	Yasumi Mikamoto	Hideo Takayashiki	July 31, 1978	July 4, 2007
Lupin is in Hong Kong for a vacation, when he is asked to find an old woman, as payment of a debt. Lupin is red-faced, and not just from the Hong Kong heat. A beautiful woman has also crossed his path. It turns out that her mother is the woman he is looking for, and the burial jar in her possession contains not the bones of her father, but the archaeologically famous bones of Peking Man! Fujiko is also after them. How will the struggle over the bone jar come out?
44	18	"The Vanished Special Armored Truck" / "Lion, Cheatin' and Stealin'"; Transliteration: "Kieta Tokubetsu Sookoosha" (Japanese: 消えた特別装甲車)	Kyosuke Mikuriya	Yoshio Takeuchi	August 7, 1978	July 5, 2007
The Sleeping Golden Lion is a statue which is being moved for the occasion of the 50th Anniversary of Australia's establishment as a nation. As defense against Lupin, an armored car made of a super-strong metal has been prepared. Under aerial surveillance by escort helicopters, Lupin steals the armored car by means of an underground elevator platform, using a herd of sheep as camouflage. But in addition to the lion statue, inside the car is Zenigata, nearly asphyxiated! Which will it be, the quarry, or Zenigata's life?!
45	19	"Murder Smells Like Wine" / "Diamonds and Minx"; Transliteration: "Koroshi wa Wine no Nioi" (Japanese: 殺しはワインの匂い)	Kyosuke Mikuriya	Sadayuki Okuyama	August 14, 1978	July 6, 2007
Lupin makes off with underworld boss Mulligan's jewelry. As might be expected, Fujiko takes them for herself, but Mulligan hires the highly skilled Hangman to get them back. This strange-smelling man pins down Lupin and company with intense machinegun fire! Unable to stand simply being wiped out, they return fire with prize wine. Having escaped one disaster, next come Zenigata?!
46	20	"Lupin is Available to the Highest Bidder" / "The Island of Dr. Derange"; Transliteration: "Lupin Otakaku Urimasu" (Japanese: ルパンお高く売ります)	Yasumi Mikamoto	Noboru Shiroyama	August 21, 1978	July 9, 2007
On the auction block at the Wanted Club, is of all people, Lupin. This organization, which captures criminals and sells them into slavery, also finds out Jigen's location due to his own carelessness. Doctor Mad makes the winning bid for Lupin, and he intends to use Lupin as a guinea pig in his human reconstruction experiments. Killer cyborgs come at Lupin on a desert island. Does flesh-and-blood Lupin stand a chance?!
47	21	"Her Majesty's Bumbling Inspectors" / "Crownin' Around"; Transliteration: "Joooheika no Zukkoke Keibu" (Japanese: 女王陛下のズッコケ警部)	Kyosuke Mikuriya	Banmei Takahashi	August 28, 1978	July 10, 2007
This time, Lupin's target is the historic Imperial State Crown, but it won't be easy, because Inspectors Dover and Pepper of Scotland Yard are keeping a tight guard on it. On their second try, on the day of the royal wedding, their trick comes off, and when the wedding bells of Westminster Abbey peal, will Big Ben chime the witching hour?!
48	22	"Lupin Laughs at the Alarm Bell" / "Vault Assault"; Transliteration: "Hijoo Bell ni Lupin wa Warau" (Japanese: 非常ベルにルパンは笑う)	Kyosuke Mikuriya	Yoshio Takeuchi	September 4, 1978	July 11, 2007
Even though he announces that he will take the till from the Kentucky Derby, Lupin's first strike, on the transport car, fails. A despondent Lupin jumps straight into the Hudson River... but it's all part of his scenario. The main act is a supposedly perfect, supposedly foolproof cracking of the Metropolitan Bank's vault. How will Lupin penetrate an alarm system that sounds loud bells at the weight of even a handkerchief?
49	23	"A Pretty Woman Has Venom" / "Snake Charmer"; Transliteration: "Kawaii Onna ni wa Doku ga Aru" (Japanese: 可愛いい女には毒がある)	Yasumi Mikamoto	Misuke Tsurumo Yoshio Takeuchi	September 11, 1978	July 12, 2007
Jacqueline - a beautiful woman who has become a multimillionaire through acquiring alimony and inheritances whenever she changes husbands. Lupin set his sights on her diamond collection, which is fine, but before you know it, Lupin and Jacqueline are very close. To a man and woman, time is unnecessary. Fujiko, who as usual is also after the treasure, is captured by the Cobra crime syndicate. What is the thread that ties together a beautiful body and a venomous snake?
50	24	"The Lupin I Loved - Part One" / "The Second Time Around - Part One"; Transliteration: "Watashi ga Aishita Lupin "Zempen"" (Japanese: 私が愛したルパン"前編")	Kyosuke Mikuriya	Yutaka Kaneko	September 18, 1978	July 13, 2007
Tonight another secret auction of smuggled artworks is beginning. Naturally, just as Lupin is taking possession of same, Fujiko comes along yet again and snatches them away. But Fujiko goes missing soon after. The pursuing woman takes off her mask, revealing to Lupin a woman he had loved in younger days, a woman, who lost her life saving Lupin's - Cornelia?!
51	25	"The Lupin I Loved - Part Two" / "The Second Time Around - Part Two"; Transliteration: "Watashi ga Aishita Lupin "Koohen"" (Japanese: 私が愛したルパン"後編")	Kyosuke Mikuriya	Yutaka Kaneko	September 25, 1978	July 16, 2007
Having met Lupin again, Cornelia does not remember him, and complains of headaches. The secret is her father, Doctor Zell, one of the last remaining Nazis. During World War II, he conducted secret experiments, the Corpse Preservation Project, and has been continuing them ever since. He has even sacrificed Cornelia, who chose Lupin over himself, to the Project. An army of the dead rises from the cemetery. Memories of love cause Cornelia confusion. "Remember, Cornelia!"
