= List of Lupin III chapters =

North American cover of the first manga volume released by Tokyopop.

Lupin III is a Japanese manga series, written and illustrated by Monkey Punch. It spawned a media franchise that includes several animated television series, television specials, theatrical and home video features as well as further manga titles.

The story follows the adventures of a gang of thieves led by Arsène Lupin III, the grandson of Arsène Lupin, the gentleman thief of Maurice Leblanc's series of novels. Lupin and his gang travel throughout the world to steal treasures and escape from the law.

Lupin III was written and illustrated by Monkey Punch. It was serialized by Futabasha in Weekly Manga Action in 94 chapters from August 10, 1967. Additional chapters known as Lupin III New Adventures were released from August 12, 1971. Tokyopop licensed the series for North America, and released all 14 volumes between December 10, 2002, and July 6, 2004. The Tokyopop edition is adapted from the Chuokoron Shinsha edition from 1989.

== Original serialization ==
Chapter no.	English translation Original Japanese title	Original release date
1	"The Dashing Entrance of Lupin III"; Transliteration: "Rupan Sansei Sassō Tōjō" (Japanese: ルパン三世颯爽登場)	August 10, 1967
2	"Prison Break"; Transliteration: "Datsugoku" (Japanese: 脱獄)	August 17, 1967
3	"Blues to Die"; Transliteration: "Shinde Yuku Burūsu" (Japanese: 死んでゆくブルース)	August 24, 1967
4	"Please Let Me See His Flower"; Transliteration: "Akasete Chōdai Aitsu no Hana" (Japanese: アかせて頂戴あいつのハナ)	August 31, 1967
5	"Suspense Zone"; Transliteration: "Sasupensu Zōn" (Japanese: サスペンス・ゾーン)	September 7, 1967
6	"Operation Failure"; Transliteration: "Shippai Daisakusen" (Japanese: シッパイ大作戦)	September 14, 1967
7	"Magician"; Transliteration: "Majutsushi" (Japanese: 魔術師)	September 21, 1967
8	"The Drifting Detective"; Transliteration: "Fuuten Tantei" (Japanese: フウテン探偵)	September 28, 1967
9	"Strange People Gathering"; Transliteration: "Atsumare Kijin Domo" (Japanese: 集まれ奇人ども)	October 5, 1967
10	"Crazy Lupin"; Transliteration: "Kureijī Rupan" (Japanese: クレイジー・ルパン)	October 12, 1967
11	"Lupin Empire in Good Health"; Transliteration: "Kenzai Rupan Teikoku" (Japanese: 健在ルパン帝国)	October 19, 1967
12	Transliteration: "Ōte Hisha Tori" (Japanese: 王手飛車とり)	October 26, 1967
13	"Killing Lupin"; Transliteration: "Rupan Goroshi" (Japanese: ルパン殺し)	—
14	"Bounty Hunter"; Transliteration: "Shōkin Kasegi" (Japanese: 賞金稼ぎ)	—
15	Transliteration: "Shiroi Tsuikeki" (Japanese: 白い追跡)	January 11, 1968
16	"Lupin as Far as Chapter 12"; Transliteration: "Rupan ni Kansuru Jū-ni-shō" (Japanese: ルパンに関する12章)	—
17	"Blunder"; Transliteration: "Doji" (Japanese: どじ)	—
18	"Sold Out Cadaver"; Transliteration: "Shitai Shinagire" (Japanese: 死体品切れ)	—
19	"Useless Mercy"; Transliteration: "Nasake Gomuyō" (Japanese: ナサケ御無用)	—
20	Transliteration: "Ore wa Tadaima Nusutto shu Gyōchū" (Japanese: 俺はタダイマぬすっ人修行中)	—
21	"Cool Touch"; Transliteration: "Kūru Tacchi" (Japanese: クール・タッチ)	—
22	"Unexpected Twist"; Transliteration: "Donden Gaeshi" (Japanese: ドンデン返し)	—
23	"The Tip of the Iceberg"; Transliteration: "Hyōzan no Ikkaku" (Japanese: 氷山の一っかく)	—
24	Transliteration: "Tobu na Akutō" (Japanese: トブな悪党)	—
25	"Look at that Pale Castle"; Transliteration: "Ano Aojiroki Shiro o Miyo" (Japanese: アノ蒼白き城を見よ)	—
26	"1000 Men"; Transliteration: "Otoko Senbiki" (Japanese: 男1000匹)	—
27	"Play Mate"; Transliteration: "Purei Meito" (Japanese: プレイ・メイト)	—
28	Transliteration: "Goemon Tōjō" (Japanese: 五右ェ門登場)	—
29	"Black Point"; Transliteration: "Burakku Pointo" (Japanese: ブラック・ポイント)	—
30	Transliteration: "Gendai Gekokujō" (Japanese: 現代下剋上)	—
31	Transliteration: "Nezumi wa Shishite Shippo o Nokosu" (Japanese: 鼠は死してシッポを残す)	—
32	"Lupin's Law"; Transliteration: "Rupan no Hōsoku" (Japanese: ルパンの法則)	February 29, 1968
33	"Stunt"; Transliteration: "Hanare Waza" (Japanese: はなれ技)	—
34	"The Stealing Game"; Transliteration: "Nussuto Gēmu" (Japanese: 盗っとゲーム)	—
35	"Happening"; Transliteration: "Happuningu" (Japanese: ハプニング)	—
36	"In the Case of a Young Man"; Transliteration: "Aru Yangu Man no Baai" (Japanese: あるヤングマンの場合)	—
37	"Lupin III and Arsène Lupin Showdown"; Transliteration: "Rupan Sansei to Arusēnu Rupan no Taiketsu" (Japanese: ルパン三世とアルセーヌ・ルパンの対決)	September 5, 1968
38	"720 Billion Inheritance"; Transliteration: "Isan Nanasennihyaku Oku" (Japanese: 遺産7200億)	September 12, 1968
39	"Mysterious Child"; Transliteration: "Kaidō" (Japanese: 怪童)	September 19, 1968
40	"Child"; Transliteration: "Jari" (Japanese: ジャリ)	September 26, 1968
41	"Crush"; Transliteration: "Kudaku" (Japanese: 砕く)	—
42	Transliteration: "Menkyo Kaiden" (Japanese: 免許皆伝)	—
43	"A Day Without Killing"; Transliteration: "Koroshi no Nai Hibi" (Japanese: 殺しのない日)	—
44	Transliteration: "Jinsei Ero Ero" (Japanese: じん性ERO・ERO)	—
45	"The Woman's Face in a Man"; Transliteration: "Otoko no Naka no Onna no Kao" (Japanese: 男の中の女の顔)	—
46	"Absolute Breakthrough"; Transliteration: "Zettai Toppa" (Japanese: 絶対突破)	—
47	"Uhani"; Transliteration: "Uhani" (Japanese: ウハニ)	—
48	"One, Two, Three, Death, Five, Six"; Transliteration: "Ichi Ni San Shi Go Roku" (Japanese: 1 2 3 死 5 6)	—
49	"Crazy & Crazy"; Transliteration: "Kyō & Kyō" (Japanese: 狂&狂)	—
50	"Fresh Man"; Transliteration: "Furesshu Man" (Japanese: フレッシュ・マン)	June 6, 1968
51	Transliteration: "Kiken Suresure" (Japanese: 危険スレスレ)	June 13, 1986
52	"Mr. Psychedelic"; Transliteration: "Saikederikku Shi" (Japanese: サイケデリック氏)	—
53	"Psychedelic in Love"; Transliteration: "Saike Suki" (Japanese: サイケ好き)	—
54	"Shameless Man"; Transliteration: "Harenchi Man" (Japanese: ハレンチ・マン)	—
55	"Deadly Sins of Lupin"; Transliteration: "Rupan no Taizai" (Japanese: ルパンの大罪)	—
56	"Dead Heat" (Japanese: DEAD HEAT)	August 8, 1968
57	"Triple Play"; Transliteration: "Toripuru Purei" (Japanese: トリプルプレイ)	October 3, 1968
58	"Fainting......"; Transliteration: "Shisshin Su......" (Japanese: 失神す……)	October 10, 1968
59	Transliteration: "Kiwadoi Karappo" (Japanese: きわどいカラッポ)	October 17, 1968
60	"Rat"; Transliteration: "Nezumi" (Japanese: 鼠)	October 24, 1968
61	"Shadow vs Shade"; Transliteration: "Kage Tai Kage" (Japanese: 影対陰)	October 31, 1968
62	"Psychedelic Idiot"; Transliteration: "Saike Baka" (Japanese: サイケ馬鹿)	—
63	"Psychedelic Clan"; Transliteration: "Saike Ichizoku" (Japanese: サイケ一族)	—
64	Transliteration: "Gizoku Bubu in" (Japanese: 義賊部々員)	—
65	"Underground Student"; Transliteration: "Angura Gakusei" (Japanese: アングラ学生)	—
66	"Lupin III vs. College Girls"; Transliteration: "Rupan Sansei Tai Joshi Daisei" (Japanese: ルパン三世対女子大学生)	—
67	"I'm Glad I Killed You"; Transliteration: "Yatte Yokatta" (Japanese: 殺ってよかった)	—
68	"First Person"; Transliteration: "Daiichininshō" (Japanese: 第一人称)	—
69	"Straight Flash"; Transliteration: "Sutoretto Furasshu" (Japanese: ストレートフラッシュ)	—
70	Transliteration: "Taizan Meidō Nezumi Ippiki" (Japanese: 泰山鳴動鼠一匹)	—
71	"Lupin Storm"; Transliteration: "Rupan Arashi" (Japanese: ルパン嵐)	—
72	"Oni" (Japanese: 鬼)	—
73	Transliteration: "Kimi ga Yare Ore ga Hōmuru (Sono Ichi)" (Japanese: キミが殺れオレが葬る（その1）)	December 26, 1968
74	Transliteration: "Kimi ga Yare Ore ga Hōmuru (Sono Ni)" (Japanese: キミが殺れオレが葬る（その2）)	January 2, 1968
75	"The Lupin Who Loved Me"; Transliteration: "Watashi ga Aishita Rupan" (Japanese: 私を愛したルパン ♥)	January 9, 1969
76	Transliteration: "Dansei to Hajiki wa Tukaiyō - Tettei Hen" (Japanese: 男性とハジキは使いよう テッテイ篇)	January 16, 1969
77	Transliteration: "Dansei to Hajiki wa Tukaiyō - Nansensu Hen" (Japanese: 男性とハジキは使いよう ナンセンス篇)	January 23, 1969
78	Transliteration: "Dansei to Hajiki wa Tukaiyō - Sasupensu Hen" (Japanese: 男性とハジキは使いよう サスペンス篇)	January 30, 1969
79	Transliteration: "Dansei to Hajiki wa Tukaiyō - Erochikku" (Japanese: 男性とハジキは使いよう エロチック篇)	February 6, 1969
80	Transliteration: "Ninkyō Rupan Bushi" (Japanese: 任侠ルパン節)	—
81	Transliteration: "Nō Aru Akutō wa Kiba o Kakusu (Sono Ichi)" (Japanese: 能ある悪党は牙をかくす（その1）)	February 13, 1969
82	Transliteration: "Nō Aru Akutō wa Kiba o Kakusu (Sono Ni)" (Japanese: 能ある悪党は牙をかくす（その2）)	February 20, 1969
83	Transliteration: "Nō Aru Akutō wa Kiba o Kakusu (Sono San)" (Japanese: 能ある悪党は牙をかくす（その3）)	February 27, 1969
84	Transliteration: "Inu mo Arukeba Rupan ni Ataru (Sono Ichi)" (Japanese: イヌも歩けばルパンにあたる（その1）)	March 13, 1969
85	Transliteration: "Inu mo Arukeba Rupan ni Ataru (Sono Ni)" (Japanese: イヌも歩けばルパンにあたる（その2）)	March 20, 1969
86	Transliteration: "Inu mo Arukeba Rupan ni Ataru (Sono San)" (Japanese: イヌも歩けばルパンにあたる（その3）)	March 27, 1969
87	Transliteration: "Inu mo Arukeba Rupan ni Ataru (Sono Yon)" (Japanese: イヌも歩けばルパンにあたる（その4）)	April 3, 1969
88	Transliteration: "Seite wa Koto o Shisonjiru (Sono Ichi)" (Japanese: せいては盗をしそんじる（その1）)	April 10, 1969
89	Transliteration: "Seite wa Koto o Shisonjiru (Sono Ni)" (Japanese: せいては盗をしそんじる（その2）)	April 17, 1969
90	Transliteration: "Seite wa Koto o Shisonjiru (Sono San)" (Japanese: せいては盗をしそんじる（その3）)	April 24, 1969
91	Transliteration: "Waga Tōsō (Sono Ichi)" (Japanese: 我が闘争（その1）)	May 1, 1969
92	Transliteration: "Waga Tōsō (Sono Ni)" (Japanese: 我が闘争（その2）)	May 8, 1969
93	Transliteration: "Waga Tōsō (Sono San)" (Japanese: 我が闘争（その3）)	May 15, 1969
94	"Farewell My Beloved Lupin!"; Transliteration: "Saraba Itoshiki Rupan!" (Japanese: さらば愛しきルパン！)	May 22, 1969

== Japanese editions ==
=== Power Comics ===
No.	Release date	ISBN
01	September 25, 1974	—
02	October 25, 1974	—
03	November 25, 1974	—
04	December 20, 1974	—
05	July 10, 1975	—
06	September 10, 1975	—
07	February 10, 1976	—
08	April 10, 1976	—
09	June 10, 1976	—
10	August 10, 1976	—
11	September 10, 1976	—
12	October 10, 1976	—
13	November 10, 1976	—
14	December 10, 1976	—

=== 100ten ===
No.	Release date	ISBN
01	January 10, 1983	—
02	January 10, 1983	—
03	February 10, 1983	—
04	February 10, 1983	—
05	March 10, 1983	—
06	March 10, 1983	—
07	April 10, 1983	—
08	April 10, 1983	—
09	May 10, 1983	—
10	May 10, 1983	—
11	June 10, 1983	—
12	June 10, 1983	—
13	July 10, 1983	—
14	July 10, 1983	—

=== Aizouban ===
The order of chapters in this edition is altered slightly, with some chapters not included and multipart stories having less chapters.

No.	Release date	ISBN
1	July 5, 1989	4-12-001819-9
2	August 1989	4-12-001820-2
3	September 1989	4-12-001821-0

== Tokyopop release ==
No.	Release date	ISBN
1	January 1, 2003	1-59182-252-1
001. "Art of the Entrance"; 002. "The Great Escape"; 003. "Mystery Woman"; 004. "To Catch a Weasel"; 005. "Crime's a Disease"; 006. "Impression Impossible"; 007. "The Hand is Quicker than the Spy"; 008. "Zenigata Gets Lucky"; 009. "Gather Ye Bad Men While Ye May"
2	January 1, 2003	1-59182-1045
010. "Educating Lupin"; 011. "Hail to the King"; 012. "Damned If You Do"; 013. "To Catch a Killer"; 014. "Interview With a Lupin"; 015. "Snowfall on Sisters"; 016. "Lupin: Behind the Manga"; 017. "A is for Action, B is for Bomb"
3	March 1, 2003	1-59182-1215
018. "Remember to Forget"; 019. "No Mercy"; 020. "School for Spies"; 021. "Portrait of a Killer"; 022. "Reversal of Fortune"; 023. "The Tip of the Iceberg"; 024. "Flowers for Fujiko"; 025. "Castle in the Mountains"; 026. "One Thousand Victims"; 027. "Playmates"; 028. "Master Goemon"
4	May 1, 2003	1-59182-1223
029. "Black Point"; 030. "Crme Douesn't Weigh"; 031. "You Dirty Rats"; 032. "Double the Pleasure"; 033. "Lupin of Arabia"; 034. "The Stealing Game"; 035. "Drunken Masters"; 036. "Tough Love"; 037. "Lupin vs. Arsène Lupin"; 038. "Inheritance"; 039. "Prodigy"
5	July 8, 2003	1-59182-1231
040. "A Chip Off the Gold Block"; 041. "Head Like a Scroll"; 042. "Testing One Two Three"; 043. "A Day Without Killing"; 044. "Smile for the Machine Gun"; 045. "Behind Every Bad Man"; 046. "Books That Go Boom"; 047. "One-Bullet Wonder"; 048. "The Dream Sequence"
6	August 5, 2003	1-59182-124X
049. "How to Succeed in Business"; 050. "Theft of a Salesman"; 051. "What a Skull Wants"; 052. "The Mind is a Mansion"; 053. "Always Be Selling"; 054. "The Company Man"; 055. "Grand Theft Auto; 056. "Triple Play"
7	September 1, 2003	1-59182-1258
057. "The World on a String"; 058. "Camera Tricks"; 059. "Medal of Dishonor"; 060. "High Art"; 061. "Death and Duality"; 062. "Double Your Guns"; 063. "Collegial Damage"; 064. "Campus Strife"; 065. "A Course in Hypocrisy"
8	October 7, 2003	1-59182-1266
066. "Lupin vs. The Coeds"; 067. "To Live and Die in Japan"; 068. "First Person, Last Laughs"; 069. "Straight Flush"; 070. "The Rat Clan and the Sea"; 071. "To Old Acquaintance Being Shot"; 072. "The Kiss of Death"; 073. "The Think System"
9	November 4, 2003	1-59182-1274
074. "The Scottish Tragedy"; 075. "Mr. Personality"; 076. "How to Turn a Prophet"; 077. "Couch Therapy"; 078. "Japan's Most Wanted"; 079. "Love Doctor"; 080. "Killing Time"; 081. "Cross of Visions"
10	December 9, 2003	1-59182-1282
082. "Voter Revolt"; 083. "Dead in a Box"; 084. "The Lupin Who Loved Me"; 085. "Lupin's Song of Chivalry"; 086. "Honor Among Thieves - Part I: Red Hot Air"; 087. "Honor Among Thieves - Part II: Inspector Lupin"
11	January 6, 2004	1-59182-4893
088. "Blood Rage"; 089. "Pink Diamonds"; 090. "Cue the Trouble"; 091. "King of the Cave"; 092. "Dead for Life"; 093. "Death After Life"
12	March 2, 2004	1-59182-4907
094. "Front Page Blues"; 095. "The Man with 20 Faces"; 096. "What You Can't See"; 097. "Lupin Sucks"
13	May 4, 2004	1-59182-4915
098. "Rasputin and the Wager"; 099. "Rasputin Returns"; 100. "Three Wives and You're Out"; 101. "Payback Playback"; 102. "Saint Goemon"; 103. "A Treasure to Serve"
14	July 6, 2004	1-5918-24923
104. "Booty in a Bottle"; 105. "Four of a Kind"; 106. "The Better Half"; 107. "Mah Jong Maniacs"; 108. "The Funeral March of Lupin III (First Movement)"; 109. "The Funeral March of Lupin III (Second Movement)"; "Lupin Tells All"
