= Daffy Duck filmography =

Daffy Duck has been featured in various media since his debut in 1937. He was voiced by vocal artist Mel Blanc, and in later years by other vocal artists such as Jeff Bergman, Joe Alaskey, Dee Bradley Baker and Eric Bauza.

== Golden age shorts (1937−1968) ==
 Legend

LT
stands for Looney Tunes
MM
stands for Merrie Melodies

=== 1937 ===
No.	Title	Original release date	Series	Directed by	Official DVD/Blu-Ray Availability	Notes
1	Porky's Duck Hunt	April 17	LT	Tex Avery	DVD: The Essential Daffy Duck; DVD: Porky Pig 101; Blu-Ray: Looney Tunes Collector's Vault: Volume 1	with Porky Pig; First Daffy Duck cartoon directed by Tex Avery
=== 1938 ===
2	Daffy Duck & Egghead	January 1	MM	Tex Avery	DVD: Looney Tunes Golden Collection: Volume 3; DVD: The Essential Daffy Duck; Blu-Ray: Looney Tunes Collector's Vault: Volume 1	with Egghead; First appearance in color; First use of Daffy Duck's name
3	What Price Porky	February 26	LT	Bob Clampett	DVD: Looney Tunes Golden Collection: Volume 5; DVD: Porky Pig 101	with Porky Pig; First Daffy Duck cartoon directed by Bob Clampett
4	Porky & Daffy	August 6	LT	Bob Clampett	DVD: Porky Pig 101	with Porky Pig
5	The Daffy Doc	November 26	LT	Bob Clampett	DVD: Looney Tunes Golden Collection: Volume 5; DVD: The Essential Daffy Duck; DVD: Porky Pig 101	with Porky Pig
6	Daffy Duck in Hollywood	December 12	MM	Tex Avery	DVD: Looney Tunes Golden Collection: Volume 3	Final Daffy Duck cartoon directed by Tex Avery
=== 1939 ===
7	Daffy Duck and the Dinosaur	April 22	MM	Chuck Jones	DVD: Looney Tunes Golden Collection: Volume 3; DVD: Looney Tunes: Spotlight Collection: Volume 7	Public Domain; First Daffy Duck cartoon directed by Chuck Jones
8	Scalp Trouble	June 24	LT	Bob Clampett	DVD: Porky Pig 101	with Porky Pig; Rarely shown due to Native American stereotyping.
9	Wise Quacks	August 5	LT	Bob Clampett	DVD: Looney Tunes Golden Collection: Volume 5; DVD: Porky Pig 101	with Porky Pig
=== 1940 ===
10	Porky's Last Stand	January 6	LT	Bob Clampett	DVD: Porky Pig 101	with Porky Pig
11	You Ought to Be in Pictures	May 18	LT	Friz Freleng	DVD: Looney Tunes Golden Collection: Volume 2; DVD: Looney Tunes: Spotlight Collection: Volume 2; Blu-Ray/DVD: Looney Tunes Platinum Collection: Volume 2; DVD: Porky Pig 101	with Porky Pig; First Daffy Duck cartoon directed by Friz Freleng
=== 1941 ===
12	A Coy Decoy	June 7	LT	Bob Clampett	DVD: Porky Pig 101	Public Domain; with Porky Pig
13	The Henpecked Duck	August 30	LT	Bob Clampett	DVD: Porky Pig 101	Public Domain; with Porky Pig
=== 1942 ===
14	Conrad the Sailor	February 28	MM	Chuck Jones	DVD: Looney Tunes Golden Collection: Volume 4; DVD: Looney Tunes: Spotlight Collection: Volume 4; Blu-Ray: Looney Tunes Collector's Vault: Volume 3	with Conrad the Cat
15	Daffy's Southern Exposure	May 2	LT	Norman McCabe	Blu-Ray: Looney Tunes Collector's Choice: Volume 2	Public Domain; Final "little Daffy" cartoon.; First Daffy Duck cartoon directed by Norman McCabe
16	The Impatient Patient	September 5	LT	Norman McCabe	Blu-Ray: Looney Tunes Collector's Choice: Volume 4	Public Domain
17	The Daffy Duckaroo	October 24	LT	Norman McCabe	Blu-Ray: Looney Tunes Collector's Vault: Volume 2	Public Domain; Final Daffy Duck cartoon directed by Norman McCabe; Rarely shown due to Native American stereotyping.
18	My Favorite Duck	December 5	LT	Chuck Jones	DVD: Looney Tunes Golden Collection: Volume 6; DVD: Looney Tunes: Spotlight Collection: Volume 6; Blu-Ray: Looney Tunes Collector's Vault: Volume 3	with Porky Pig
=== 1943 ===
19	To Duck.... or Not to Duck	March 6	LT	Chuck Jones	DVD: Looney Tunes Golden Collection: Volume 6; DVD: Looney Tunes: Spotlight Collection: Volume 6	Public Domain; with Elmer Fudd
20	The Wise Quacking Duck	May 1	LT	Bob Clampett	DVD: Looney Tunes Golden Collection: Volume 5; Blu-Ray/DVD: Looney Tunes Platinum Collection: Volume 2; DVD: Looney Tunes: Spotlight Collection: Volume 8	
21	Yankee Doodle Daffy	June 5	LT	Friz Freleng	DVD: Looney Tunes Golden Collection: Volume 1	Public Domain; with Porky Pig
22	Porky Pig's Feat	July 17	LT	Frank Tashlin	DVD: Looney Tunes Golden Collection: Volume 3; Blu-Ray/DVD: Looney Tunes Platinum Collection: Volume 3; DVD: Porky Pig 101	Public Domain; with Porky Pig and cameo appearance by Bugs Bunny; First Daffy Duck cartoon directed by Frank Tashlin
23	Scrap Happy Daffy	August 21	LT	Frank Tashlin	DVD: Looney Tunes Golden Collection: Volume 5; Blu-Ray/DVD: Looney Tunes Platinum Collection: Volume 3	Public Domain; Final appearance in black-and-white
24	A Corny Concerto	September 25	MM	Bob Clampett	DVD: Looney Tunes Golden Collection: Volume 2; DVD: Looney Tunes: Spotlight Collection: Volume 2; Blu-Ray/DVD: Looney Tunes Platinum Collection: Volume 3	Public Domain; with Bugs Bunny, Elmer Fudd, and Porky Pig
25	Daffy – The Commando	November 20	LT	Friz Freleng	DVD: Looney Tunes Golden Collection: Volume 6; Blu-Ray: Looney Tunes Collector's Vault: Volume 3	Public Domain
=== 1944 ===
26	Tom Turk and Daffy	February 12	LT	Chuck Jones	DVD: Looney Tunes Super Stars' Porky & Friends: Hilarious Ham; Blu-Ray: Looney Tunes Collector's Vault: Volume 1	with Porky Pig and Tom Turk
27	Tick Tock Tuckered	April 8	LT	Bob Clampett	DVD: Looney Tunes Super Stars' Daffy Duck: Frustrated Fowl	with Porky Pig; Color remake of Porky's Badtime Story.
28	Duck Soup to Nuts	May 27	LT	Friz Freleng	DVD: Looney Tunes Golden Collection: Volume 2; DVD: Looney Tunes: Spotlight Collection: Volume 2; Blu-Ray: Looney Tunes Collector's Vault: Volume 3	with Porky Pig
29	Slightly Daffy	June 17	MM	Friz Freleng	Blu-Ray: Looney Tunes Collector's Vault: Volume 3	with Porky Pig; Color remake of Scalp Trouble.; Rarely shown due to Native American stereotyping.
30	Plane Daffy	September 16	LT	Frank Tashlin	DVD: Looney Tunes Golden Collection: Volume 4; DVD: The Essential Daffy Duck; Blu-Ray/DVD: Looney Tunes Platinum Collection: Volume 3	
31	The Stupid Cupid	November 25	LT	Frank Tashlin	DVD: Looney Tunes Golden Collection: Volume 4; Blu-Ray/DVD: Looney Tunes Platinum Collection: Volume 3	with Elmer Fudd
=== 1945 ===
32	Draftee Daffy	January 27	LT	Bob Clampett	DVD: Looney Tunes Golden Collection: Volume 3; DVD: Looney Tunes: Spotlight Collection: Volume 7; Blu-Ray/DVD: Looney Tunes Platinum Collection: Volume 3	
33	Ain't That Ducky	May 19	LT	Friz Freleng	Blu-Ray: Looney Tunes Collector's Vault: Volume 2	
34	Nasty Quacks	December 1	MM	Frank Tashlin	DVD: Looney Tunes Super Stars' Daffy Duck: Frustrated Fowl; DVD: The Essential Daffy Duck; Blu-Ray/DVD: Looney Tunes Platinum Collection: Volume 3	Final Daffy Duck cartoon directed by Frank Tashlin; with Melissa Duck
=== 1946 ===
35	Book Revue	January 5	LT	Bob Clampett	DVD: Looney Tunes Golden Collection: Volume 2; DVD: Looney Tunes: Spotlight Collection: Volume 2; DVD: The Essential Daffy Duck; Blu-Ray/DVD: Looney Tunes Platinum Collection: Volume 2	
36	Baby Bottleneck	March 16	LT	Bob Clampett	DVD: Looney Tunes Golden Collection: Volume 2; DVD: Looney Tunes: Spotlight Collection: Volume 2; Blu-Ray/DVD: Looney Tunes Platinum Collection: Volume 1	with Porky Pig
37	Daffy Doodles	April 6	LT	Robert McKimson	Blu-Ray: Looney Tunes Collector's Choice: Volume 1	with Porky Pig; First cartoon directed by Robert McKimson
38	Hollywood Daffy	June 22	MM	Friz Freleng Hawley Pratt (Note: Friz Freleng was originally intended to direct the short, but refused to work on it as he was unsatisfied with the story. Freleng would direct the short, but was also assisted by his layout artist Hawley Pratt by helping him make the production board.)	DVD: Looney Tunes Golden Collection: Volume 5; Blu-Ray: Looney Tunes Collector's Vault: Volume 3	First cartoon co-directed by Hawley Pratt.
39	The Great Piggy Bank Robbery	July 20	LT	Bob Clampett	DVD: Looney Tunes Golden Collection: Volume 2; DVD: Looney Tunes: Spotlight Collection: Volume 2; DVD: The Essential Daffy Duck; Blu-Ray/DVD: Looney Tunes Platinum Collection: Volume 1	Cameo appearance by Porky Pig; Final Daffy Duck cartoon directed by Bob Clampett
=== 1947 ===
40	Birth of a Notion	April 12	LT	Robert McKimson	DVD: Looney Tunes Golden Collection: Volume 6; DVD: Looney Tunes: Spotlight Collection: Volume 6; Blu-Ray: Looney Tunes Collector's Vault: Volume 1	
41	Along Came Daffy	June 4	LT	Friz Freleng	Blu-Ray: Looney Tunes Collector's Choice: Volume 4	with Yosemite Sam
42	A Pest in the House	August 2	MM	Chuck Jones	DVD: Looney Tunes Golden Collection: Volume 5; DVD: Looney Tunes: Spotlight Collection: Volume 5; Blu-Ray/DVD: Looney Tunes Platinum Collection: Volume 1	with Elmer Fudd
43	Mexican Joyride	November 29	LT	Arthur Davis	Blu-Ray: Looney Tunes Collector's Choice: Volume 3	First Daffy Duck cartoon directed by Arthur Davis
=== 1948 ===
44	What Makes Daffy Duck	February 14	LT	Arthur Davis	Blu-Ray/DVD: Looney Tunes Platinum Collection: Volume 2	with Elmer Fudd
45	Daffy Duck Slept Here	March 6	MM	Robert McKimson	DVD: Looney Tunes Golden Collection: Volume 3; DVD: Stars of Space Jam: Daffy Duck	with Porky Pig
46	The Up-Standing Sitter	July 3	LT	Robert McKimson	DVD: Looney Tunes Golden Collection: Volume 5; DVD: Looney Tunes: Spotlight Collection: Volume 5	
47	You Were Never Duckier	August 7	MM	Chuck Jones	DVD: Looney Tunes Golden Collection: Volume 5; DVD: Looney Tunes: Spotlight Collection: Volume 5; Blu-Ray: Looney Tunes Collector's Vault: Volume 2	with Henery Hawk
48	Daffy Dilly	October 30	MM	Chuck Jones	DVD: Looney Tunes Super Stars' Daffy Duck: Frustrated Fowl; Blu-Ray: Looney Tunes Collector's Vault: Volume 1	
49	The Stupor Salesman	November 20	LT	Arthur Davis	DVD: Looney Tunes Golden Collection: Volume 5; DVD: Looney Tunes: Spotlight Collection: Volume 5; Blu-Ray/DVD: Looney Tunes Platinum Collection: Volume 3	
50	Riff Raffy Daffy	November 27	LT	Arthur Davis	DVD: Looney Tunes Super Stars' Porky & Friends: Hilarious Ham; Blu-Ray: Looney Tunes Collector's Choice: Volume 3	with Porky Pig
=== 1949 ===
51	Wise Quackers	January 1	LT	Friz Freleng	DVD: Looney Tunes Super Stars' Daffy Duck: Frustrated Fowl; Blu-Ray: Looney Tunes Collector's Vault: Volume 2	with Elmer Fudd
52	Holiday for Drumsticks	January 22	MM	Arthur Davis	Blu-Ray: Looney Tunes Collector's Choice: Volume 4	with Tom Turk; Final Daffy Duck cartoon directed by Arthur Davis until 1962
53	Daffy Duck Hunt	March 26	LT	Robert McKimson	DVD: Looney Tunes Golden Collection: Volume 1; DVD: Looney Tunes: Spotlight Collection: Volume 1	with Porky Pig and the Barnyard Dawg
=== 1950 ===
54	Boobs in the Woods	January 28	LT	Robert McKimson	DVD: Looney Tunes Golden Collection: Volume 1; DVD: Looney Tunes Super Stars' Porky & Friends: Hilarious Ham; Blu-Ray: Looney Tunes Collector's Vault: Volume 3	with Porky Pig
55	The Scarlet Pumpernickel	March 4	LT	Chuck Jones	DVD: Looney Tunes Golden Collection: Volume 1; DVD: The Essential Daffy Duck; Blu-Ray/DVD: Looney Tunes Platinum Collection: Volume 1	with Melissa Duck, Porky Pig, and Sylvester, and cameo appearances by Elmer Fudd, Henery Hawk, and Mama Bear
56	His Bitter Half	May 20	MM	Friz Freleng	Blu-Ray: Looney Tunes Collector's Choice: Volume 1	
57	Golden Yeggs	August 5	MM	Friz Freleng	DVD: Looney Tunes Golden Collection: Volume 1	with Porky Pig and Rocky
58	The Ducksters	September 2	LT	Chuck Jones	DVD: Looney Tunes Golden Collection: Volume 1	with Porky Pig
=== 1951 ===
59	Rabbit Fire	May 19	LT	Chuck Jones	DVD: Looney Tunes Golden Collection: Volume 1; DVD: The Essential Bugs Bunny; Blu-Ray/DVD: Looney Tunes Platinum Collection: Volume 2; Blu-Ray: Bugs Bunny 80th Anniversary Collection	with Bugs Bunny and Elmer Fudd; First cartoon in the "Hunting" trilogy
60	Drip-Along Daffy	November 17	MM	Chuck Jones	DVD: Looney Tunes Golden Collection: Volume 1; Blu-Ray/DVD: Looney Tunes Platinum Collection: Volume 2	with Porky Pig and Nasty Canasta
61	The Prize Pest	December 22	LT	Robert McKimson	DVD: Looney Tunes Super Stars' Daffy Duck: Frustrated Fowl	with Porky Pig
=== 1952 ===
62	Thumb Fun	March 1	LT	Robert McKimson	DVD: Looney Tunes Super Stars' Porky & Friends: Hilarious Ham	with Porky Pig
63	Cracked Quack	July 5	MM	Friz Freleng	Blu-Ray: Looney Tunes Collector's Choice: Volume 1	with Porky Pig
64	Rabbit Seasoning	September 20	MM	Chuck Jones	DVD: Looney Tunes Golden Collection: Volume 1; DVD: Looney Tunes: Spotlight Collection: Volume 7; Blu-Ray/DVD: Looney Tunes Platinum Collection: Volume 2	with Bugs Bunny and Elmer Fudd; Second installment of the "Hunting" trilogy.
65	The Super Snooper	November 1	LT	Robert McKimson	DVD: Looney Tunes Golden Collection: Volume 5; DVD: Looney Tunes: Spotlight Collection: Volume 5	
66	Fool Coverage	December 13	LT	Robert McKimson	DVD: Looney Tunes Super Stars' Porky & Friends: Hilarious Ham	with Porky Pig
=== 1953 ===
67	Duck Amuck	February 28	MM	Chuck Jones	DVD: Looney Tunes Golden Collection: Volume 1; DVD: The Essential Daffy Duck; Blu-Ray/DVD: Looney Tunes Platinum Collection: Volume 1	Cameo appearance by Bugs Bunny
68	Muscle Tussle	April 18	MM	Robert McKimson	Blu-Ray: Looney Tunes Collector's Choice: Volume 4	
69	Duck Dodgers in the 24½th Century	July 25	MM	Chuck Jones	DVD: Looney Tunes Golden Collection: Volume 1; DVD: The Essential Daffy Duck; Blu-Ray/DVD: Looney Tunes Platinum Collection: Volume 1	with Marvin the Martian and Porky Pig
70	Duck! Rabbit, Duck!	October 3	MM	Chuck Jones	DVD: Looney Tunes Golden Collection: Volume 3; Blu-Ray/DVD: Looney Tunes Platinum Collection: Volume 2	with Bugs Bunny and Elmer Fudd; Third and final installment in the "Hunting" trilogy.
=== 1954 ===
71	Design for Leaving	March 27	LT	Robert McKimson	DVD: Looney Tunes Super Stars' Daffy Duck: Frustrated Fowl (cropped to widescreen)	with Elmer Fudd
72	Quack Shot	October 30	MM	Robert McKimson	Blu-Ray: Looney Tunes Collector's Choice: Volume 4	with Elmer Fudd
73	My Little Duckaroo	November 27	MM	Chuck Jones	DVD: Looney Tunes Golden Collection: Volume 6; DVD: The Essential Daffy Duck	with Porky Pig and Nasty Canasta
=== 1955 ===
74	Beanstalk Bunny	February 12	MM	Chuck Jones	Blu-Ray: Looney Tunes Collector's Choice: Volume 1	with Bugs Bunny and Elmer Fudd
75	Stork Naked	February 26	MM	Friz Freleng	DVD: Looney Tunes Super Stars' Daffy Duck: Frustrated Fowl (cropped to widescreen); Blu-Ray: Looney Tunes Collector's Choice: Volume 4 (bonus feature, correct aspect ratio)	
76	Sahara Hare	March 26	LT	Friz Freleng	DVD: Looney Tunes Golden Collection: Volume 4; DVD: Looney Tunes: Spotlight Collection: Volume 4	Daffy Duck makes a cameo in this Bugs Bunny/Yosemite Sam cartoon
77	This Is a Life?	July 9	MM	Friz Freleng	DVD: Looney Tunes Super Stars' Daffy Duck: Frustrated Fowl (cropped to widescreen); Blu-Ray: Bugs Bunny 80th Anniversary Collection (correct aspect ratio)	with Bugs Bunny, Elmer Fudd, Yosemite Sam, and Granny; First time June Foray provides the voice of Granny.; Utilizes footage from A Hare Grows in Manhattan, Hare Do and Buccaneer Bunny.
78	Dime to Retire	September 3	LT	Robert McKimson	DVD: Looney Tunes Super Stars' Daffy Duck: Frustrated Fowl (cropped to widescreen)	with Porky Pig
=== 1956 ===
79	The High and the Flighty	February 18	MM	Robert McKimson	Blu-Ray/DVD: Looney Tunes Platinum Collection: Volume 2	with Foghorn Leghorn and the Barnyard Dawg
80	Rocket Squad	March 10	MM	Chuck Jones	DVD: Looney Tunes Golden Collection: Volume 3	with Porky Pig
81	Stupor Duck	July 7	LT	Robert McKimson	DVD: Looney Tunes Golden Collection: Volume 5; DVD: Looney Tunes: Spotlight Collection: Volume 5	
82	A Star Is Bored	September 15	LT	Friz Freleng	DVD: Looney Tunes Golden Collection: Volume 5; DVD: Looney Tunes: Spotlight Collection: Volume 5; DVD: The Essential Daffy Duck; Blu-Ray: Looney Tunes Collector's Vault: Volume 3	with Bugs Bunny, Elmer Fudd, and Yosemite Sam
83	Deduce, You Say!	September 29	LT	Chuck Jones	DVD: Looney Tunes Golden Collection: Volume 1; DVD: The Essential Daffy Duck; Blu-Ray/DVD: Looney Tunes Platinum Collection: Volume 2	with Porky Pig
=== 1957 ===
84	Ali Baba Bunny	February 9	MM	Chuck Jones	DVD: Looney Tunes Golden Collection: Volume 5; DVD: Looney Tunes: Spotlight Collection: Volume 5; DVD: The Essential Daffy Duck; Blu-Ray/DVD: Looney Tunes Platinum Collection: Volume 2; DVD: Stars of Space Jam: Bugs Bunny	with Bugs Bunny
85	Boston Quackie	June 22	LT	Robert McKimson	Blu-Ray: Looney Tunes Collector's Vault: Volume 2	with Porky Pig
86	Ducking the Devil	August 17	MM	Robert McKimson	DVD: Looney Tunes Super Stars' Daffy Duck: Frustrated Fowl (cropped to widescreen); Blu-Ray/DVD: Looney Tunes Platinum Collection: Volume 1 (correct aspect ratio)	with the Tasmanian Devil
87	Show Biz Bugs	November 2	LT	Friz Freleng	DVD: Looney Tunes Golden Collection: Volume 2; DVD: Looney Tunes: Spotlight Collection: Volume 2; DVD: The Essential Bugs Bunny; Blu-Ray/DVD: Looney Tunes Platinum Collection: Volume 2; Blu-Ray: Bugs Bunny 80th Anniversary Collection	with Bugs Bunny
=== 1958 ===
88	Don't Axe Me	January 4	MM	Robert McKimson	Blu-Ray: Looney Tunes Collector's Vault: Volume 3	with Elmer Fudd and the Barnyard Dawg
89	Robin Hood Daffy	March 8	MM	Chuck Jones	DVD: Looney Tunes Golden Collection: Volume 3; DVD: The Essential Daffy Duck; Blu-Ray/DVD: Looney Tunes Platinum Collection: Volume 1	with Porky Pig
=== 1959 ===
90	China Jones	February 14	LT	Robert McKimson	Blu-Ray: Looney Tunes Collector's Choice: Volume 3	with Porky Pig; Rarely shown due to liberal use of Chinese stereotypes.
91	Apes of Wrath	April 18	MM	Friz Freleng	DVD: Looney Tunes Super Stars' Bugs Bunny: Hare Extraordinaire (cropped to widescreen); DVD: Looney Tunes Parodies Collection (correct aspect ratio)	Daffy Duck makes a cameo in this Bugs Bunny cartoon
92	People Are Bunny	December 19	MM	Robert McKimson	DVD: Looney Tunes Super Stars' Daffy Duck: Frustrated Fowl (cropped to widescreen); Blu-Ray: Bugs Bunny 80th Anniversary Collection (correct aspect ratio)	with Bugs Bunny
=== 1960 ===
93	Person to Bunny	April 1	MM	Friz Freleng	DVD: Looney Tunes Super Stars' Daffy Duck: Frustrated Fowl (cropped to widescreen); Blu-Ray: Bugs Bunny 80th Anniversary Collection (correct aspect ratio)	with Bugs Bunny and Elmer Fudd
=== 1961 ===
94	The Abominable Snow Rabbit	May 20	LT	Chuck Jones and Maurice Noble (co-director)	DVD: Looney Tunes Golden Collection: Volume 5; DVD: Looney Tunes: Spotlight Collection: Volume 5	with Bugs Bunny; Final Daffy Duck cartoon directed by Chuck Jones
95	Daffy's Inn Trouble	September 23	LT	Robert McKimson	DVD: Looney Tunes Super Stars' Daffy Duck: Frustrated Fowl (cropped to widescreen)	with Porky Pig
=== 1962 ===
96	Quackodile Tears	March 31	MM	Arthur Davis	Blu-Ray: Looney Tunes Collector's Vault: Volume 1	Final Daffy Duck cartoon directed by Arthur Davis
97	Good Noose	November 10	LT	Robert McKimson	Currently Unavailable	
=== 1963 ===
98	Fast Buck Duck	March 9	MM	Robert McKimson and Ted Bonnicksen (co-director)	Currently Unavailable	
99	The Million Hare	April 6	LT	Robert McKimson	DVD: Looney Tunes Super Stars' Bugs Bunny: Hare Extraordinaire (cropped to widescreen); Blu-Ray: Bugs Bunny 80th Anniversary Collection (correct aspect ratio)	with Bugs Bunny
100	Aqua Duck	September 28	MM	Robert McKimson	Currently Unavailable	
=== 1964 ===
101	The Iceman Ducketh	May 16	LT	Phil Monroe and Maurice Noble (co-director)	DVD: Looney Tunes Super Stars' Daffy Duck: Frustrated Fowl (cropped to widescreen)	Final appearance with Bugs Bunny; Final Daffy Duck cartoon produced by Warner Bros. Cartoons
=== 1965 ===
102	It's Nice to Have a Mouse Around the House	January 16	LT	Friz Freleng and Hawley Pratt (co-director)	Blu-Ray/DVD: Looney Tunes Mouse Chronicles: The Chuck Jones Collection (bonus feature, unrestored)	with Speedy Gonzales, Sylvester, and Granny; First appearance with Speedy Gonzales.; Final Daffy Duck cartoon directed by Friz Freleng; First Daffy Duck cartoon produced by DePatie–Freleng Enterprises
103	Moby Duck	March 27	LT	Robert McKimson	Currently Unavailable	with Speedy Gonzales
104	Assault and Peppered	April 24	MM	Robert McKimson	Currently Unavailable	with Speedy Gonzales
105	Well Worn Daffy	May 22	LT	Robert McKimson	Currently Unavailable	with Speedy Gonzales
106	Suppressed Duck	June 18	LT	Robert McKimson	DVD: Looney Tunes Super Stars' Daffy Duck: Frustrated Fowl (cropped to widescreen)	Final solo Daffy Duck cartoon until 1987.
107	Corn on the Cop	July 24	MM	Irv Spector	DVD: Looney Tunes Super Stars' Porky & Friends: Hilarious Ham	with Porky Pig and Granny; Final appearance with Porky Pig in a major role
108	Tease for Two	August 28	LT	Robert McKimson	Currently Unavailable	with the Goofy Gophers; Final theatrical cartoon until 1987 where Daffy Duck is not paired with Speedy Gonzales.
109	Chili Corn Corny	October 23	LT	Robert McKimson	Currently Unavailable	with Speedy Gonzales
110	Go Go Amigo	November 20	MM	Robert McKimson	Currently Unavailable	with Speedy Gonzales
=== 1966 ===
111	The Astroduck	January 1	LT	Robert McKimson	Currently Unavailable	with Speedy Gonzales
112	Mucho Locos	February 5	MM	Robert McKimson	Currently Unavailable	with Speedy Gonzales and cameo appearance by Porky Pig; Final appearance with Porky Pig; Utilizes recycled animation from Robin Hood Daffy, Tortilla Flaps, Deduce, You Say!, Mexicali Shmoes, and China Jones.
113	Mexican Mousepiece	February 26	MM	Robert McKimson	Currently Unavailable	with Speedy Gonzales
114	Daffy Rents	March 26	LT	Robert McKimson	Currently Unavailable	with Speedy Gonzales
115	A-Haunting We Will Go	April 16	LT	Robert McKimson	DVD: Looney Tunes Golden Collection: Volume 4; Blu-Ray/DVD: Looney Tunes Platinum Collection: Volume 1	with Speedy Gonzales and Witch Hazel
116	Snow Excuse	May 21	MM	Robert McKimson	Currently Unavailable	with Speedy Gonzales
117	A Squeak in the Deep	July 19	LT	Robert McKimson	Currently Unavailable	with Speedy Gonzales
118	Feather Finger	August 20	MM	Robert McKimson	Currently Unavailable	with Speedy Gonzales
119	Swing Ding Amigo	September 17	LT	Robert McKimson	Currently Unavailable	with Speedy Gonzales
120	A Taste of Catnip	December 3	MM	Robert McKimson	Currently Unavailable	with Speedy Gonzales and cameo appearance by Sylvester
=== 1967 ===
121	Daffy's Diner	January 21	MM	Robert McKimson	Currently Unavailable	with Speedy Gonzales; Final Daffy Duck cartoon directed by Robert McKimson; Final cartoon produced by DePatie–Freleng Enterprises
122	Quacker Tracker	April 29	LT	Rudy Larriva	Currently Unavailable	with Speedy Gonzales; Produced by Format Productions
123	The Music Mice-Tro	May 27	MM	Rudy Larriva	Currently Unavailable	with Speedy Gonzales; Produced by Format Productions
124	The Spy Swatter	June 24	LT	Rudy Larriva	Currently Unavailable	with Speedy Gonzales; Produced by Format Productions
125	Speedy Ghost to Town	July 29	MM	Alex Lovy	Currently Unavailable	with Speedy Gonzales; First cartoon produced by Warner Bros.–Seven Arts Animation
126	Rodent to Stardom	September 23	LT	Alex Lovy	Currently Unavailable	with Speedy Gonzales
127	Go Away Stowaway	September 30	MM	Alex Lovy	Currently Unavailable	with Speedy Gonzales
128	Fiesta Fiasco	December 9	LT	Alex Lovy	Currently Unavailable	with Speedy Gonzales
=== 1968 ===
129	Skyscraper Caper	March 9	LT	Alex Lovy	Currently Unavailable	with Speedy Gonzales
130	See Ya Later Gladiator	June 29	LT	Alex Lovy	Currently Unavailable	Final cartoon with Speedy Gonzales; Final theatrical Daffy Duck cartoon until 1987; Final Daffy Duck cartoon produced by Warner Bros.–Seven Arts Animation

== Post-golden age media ==
=== 1970 ===
- Pat Paulsen's Half a Comedy Hour: Paulsen interviews Daffy (voiced by Mel Blanc) in the debut episode.

=== 1972 ===
- The ABC Saturday Superstar Movie: "Daffy Duck and Porky Pig Meet the Groovie Goolies" First TV production. Voiced by Mel Blanc.

=== 1976 ===
- Bugs and Daffy's Carnival of the Animals

=== 1977 ===
- Bugs Bunny's Easter Special
- Bugs Bunny in Space

=== 1978 ===
- How Bugs Bunny Won the West
- A Connecticut Rabbit in King Arthur's Court
- Bugs Bunny's Howl-Oween Special

=== 1979 ===
- Bugs Bunny's Valentine
- The Mother's Day Special
- The Bugs Bunny/Road Runner Movie

=== 1980 ===
- The Yolk's on You (originally part of Daffy Duck's Easter Egg-Citement)
- The Chocolate Chase (originally part of Daffy Duck's Easter Egg-Citement)
- Daffy Flies North (originally part of Daffy Duck's Easter Egg-Citement)
- Duck Dodgers and the Return of the 24½th Century - (edited into Daffy Duck's Thanks-for-Giving Special)

=== 1981 ===
- The Looney Looney Looney Bugs Bunny Movie

=== 1982 ===
- Bugs Bunny's Mad World of Television
- Bugs Bunny's 3rd Movie: 1001 Rabbit Tales

=== 1983 ===
- Daffy Duck's Fantastic Island

=== 1987 ===
- The Duxorcist (LT) - voiced by Mel Blanc. (later edited into Daffy Duck's Quackbusters the following year)
- 59th Academy Awards - animation for Bugs Bunny presenting the award for Best Animated Short.

=== 1988 ===
- Who Framed Roger Rabbit
- The Night of the Living Duck (MM) - singing voice by Mel Torme. (edited into Daffy Duck's Quackbusters)
- Bugs vs. Daffy: Battle of the Music Video Stars

=== 1989 ===
- Bugs Bunny's Wild World of Sports - Final performance as Daffy by Mel Blanc.

=== 1990 ===
- 62nd Academy Awards - Animation for Bugs Bunny presenting the award for Best Animated Short.
- Cartoon All-Stars to the Rescue - first time Daffy was voiced by Jeff Bergman.
- Gremlins 2: The New Batch - voiced by Jeff Bergman.
- Tiny Toon Adventures - voiced by Jeff Bergman, Joe Alaskey, and Greg Burson (several episodes between 1990 and 1995).
- Happy Birthday, Bugs!: 50 Looney Years

=== 1991 ===
- Box-Office Bunny (LT) - Starring Bugs Bunny, voiced by Jeff Bergman.
- (Blooper) Bunny (MM) - Starring Bugs Bunny, voiced by Jeff Bergman.
- Taz-Mania - voiced by Maurice LaMarche (episode: Devil of a Job).
- Bugs Bunny's Lunar Tunes - starring Bugs Bunny, voiced by Joe Alaskey.
- Bugs Bunny's Overtures to Disaster

=== 1992 ===
- Bugs Bunny's Creature Features - starring Bugs Bunny, voiced by Jeff Bergman.
- Invasion of the Bunny Snatchers (LT) - starring Bugs Bunny, voiced by Jeff Bergman.
- The Plucky Duck Show - voiced by Jeff Bergman (episode: Duck Trek).

=== 1993 ===
- Animaniacs - voiced by Greg Burson (1993–1997), and by Mel Blanc through archival footage in "Critical Condition". Appears in episodes "De-Zanitized", "Taming of the Screwy", H.M.S. Yakko", "Critical Condition", "Video Review", "The Warners' 65th Anniversary Special", "Back in Style"

=== 1995 ===
- 67th Academy Awards - Animation for Bugs Bunny and Daffy Duck presenting the award for Best Animated Short.
- Carrotblanca - voiced by Joe Alaskey.

=== 1996 ===
- Superior Duck (LT) - only time Daffy was voiced by Frank Gorshin.
- Marvin the Martian in the Third Dimension (LT) - voiced by Joe Alaskey.
- Space Jam - first time Daffy was voiced by Dee Bradley Baker. (later reprises his role in Wabbit/New Looney Tunes)

=== 1998 ===
- The Drew Carey Show - voiced by Joe Alaskey (episode: My Best Friend's Wedding).
- Quest for Camelot Sing-A-Longs - voiced by Joe Alaskey.
- Looney Tunes Sing-A-Longs - voiced by Joe Alaskey.

=== 2000 ===
- Tweety's High-Flying Adventure - voiced by Joe Alaskey.

=== 2001 ===
- Baby Looney Tunes - voiced by Samuel Vincent (2001–2006).

=== 2003 ===
- Baby Looney Tunes: Eggs-traordinary Adventure, voiced by Samuel Vincent.
- Duck Dodgers - voiced by Joe Alaskey (2003–2005).
- Looney Tunes: Back in Action - voiced by Joe Alaskey.
- Looney Tunes: Reality Check, voiced by Joe Alaskey.
- Looney Tunes: Stranger Than Fiction, voiced by Joe Alaskey.

=== 2004 ===
- Attack of the Drones (LT) - only time Daffy was voiced by Jeff Bennett.
- Daffy Duck for President - voiced by Joe Alaskey.

=== 2006 ===
- Porky and Daffy in the William Tell Overture
- Bah, Humduck! A Looney Tunes Christmas - voiced by Joe Alaskey.

=== 2011 ===
- The Looney Tunes Show - voiced by Jeff Bergman (2011–2014).

=== 2012 ===
- Daffy's Rhapsody (LT) - voiced by Mel Blanc (via archive audio).

=== 2015 ===
- Looney Tunes: Rabbits Run - voiced by Jeff Bergman.
- Wabbit/New Looney Tunes - voiced by Dee Bradley Baker.

=== 2018 ===
- Teen Titans Go! To the Movies - Cameo during the opening Warner Bros. Animation logo. Voiced by Eric Bauza.

=== 2019 ===
- Looney Tunes Cartoons - voiced by Eric Bauza.

=== 2020 ===
- Mortal Kombat Legends: Scorpion's Revenge - Cameo during the opening Warner Bros. Animation logo, where he is grabbed by Scorpion. Voiced by Eric Bauza.
- Animaniacs - Appears in segments "Suspended Animation Part 2", "Suffragette City", "The Warners Are Present", and "Yakko Amakko". Voiced by Eric Bauza in "Yakko Amakko", no voice actor for other segments.

=== 2021 ===
- Teen Titans Go! See Space Jam, voiced by Dee Bradley Baker via archive footage from Space Jam.
- Space Jam: A New Legacy - voiced by Eric Bauza.

=== 2022 ===
- Bugs Bunny Builders - voiced by Eric Bauza.

=== 2024 ===
- The Day the Earth Blew Up - voiced by Eric Bauza.

=== 2026 ===
- Looney Tunes Gokko
- Coyote vs. Acme - voiced by Eric Bauza.
- Daffy Season (LT) - voiced by Eric Bauza.

== See also ==
- The Bugs Bunny Show (1960-2000)
