= Scalp Trouble =

1939 film by Robert Clampett

- Directed by: Robert Clampett
- Story by: Ernest Gee
- Produced by: Leon Schlesinger
- Starring: Mel Blanc
- Music by: Carl W. Stalling
- Animation by: Norman McCabe
- Color process: Black and white
- Production company: Leon Schlesinger Productions
- Distributed by: Warner Bros. Pictures
- Release date: June 24, 1939
- Running time: 7:02
- Language: English

Scalp Trouble is a 1939 American animated comedy short film directed by Robert Clampett. The cartoon was released on June 24, 1939. It is part of the Looney Tunes series, the 59th cartoon to feature Porky Pig and the eighth cartoon to feature Daffy Duck.

== Plot ==
Indians sneak near an army post, where they deceive a dog guard who asks the audience if they had seen any Indians. General Daffy, wielding a dagger in a comically long sheath, is forced to stab a sleepy guard to wake the soldiers, who all wake up except for Porky. Daffy is unable to wake up Porky until he sleeps next to Porky and causes the bed to collapse. Porky is hit by the sheath and launches backward, with his rifle launching him into Daffy instead.

Porky spots Indians and fails to notify the guards until he finds an Indian sneaking nearby and slams a barrel on him. As the Indians raid the post by burning a hole with "fire water", Porky and the other soldiers retaliate with gunfire and cannonballs. An Indian archer uses the knees of another archer to shoot. A soldier kills 9 of them while keeping score to the tune of "Ten Little Indians", but is knocked out by an Indian. Porky's gun jams and he calls to Daffy for help while being pursued. Daffy brings supplies but trips and accidentally swallows bullets, allowing him to be used as a machine gun for Porky to wound and dispel the Indians. Daffy is relieved when he stops shooting bullets, but trips and shoots again.

=== Voice Cast ===
- Mel Blanc as Daffy Duck / Porky Pig / Native Americans / Cavalrymen

=== Home media ===
- DVD 2017 - Porky Pig 101 (remastered) - Warner Archive Collection

== Slightly Daffy ==
Slightly Daffy
- Directed by: I. Freleng
- Story by: Michael Maltese
- Produced by: Leon Schlesinger
- Starring: Mel Blanc
- Music by: Carl W. Stalling
- Animation by: Gerry Chiniquy
- Color process: Technicolor
- Production company: Leon Schlesinger Productions
- Distributed by: Warner Bros. Pictures
- Release date: June 17, 1944
- Running time: 6:11
- Language: English

The cartoon was remade by Friz Freleng in Technicolor and released as part of the Merrie Melodies series on June 17, 1944, under the name Slightly Daffy. Unlike the remakes directed by Clampett, the short is mostly a frame-by-frame remake. However, it features new voice recordings, a few new animated scenes, and re-orchestrated music. The Blue Ribbon reissue is approximately 49 seconds shorter than the original cartoon.

The short also reused scenes from other old cartoons, such as Johnny Smith and Poker-Huntas (By Tex Avery) for the first few scenes of the Indians, and The Hardship of Miles Standish (Also by Freleng) for the scene of the Indians firing their bows.

=== Voice Cast ===
- Mel Blanc as Daffy Duck / Porky Pig / Native Americans / Cavalrymen

=== Home Media ===
- VHS 1988 - Cartoon Moviestars: Daffy! - MGM/UA Home Video
- Laserdisc 1988 - Cartoon Moviestars: Daffy! and Porky! - MGM/UA Home Video
- Laserdisc 1992 - The Golden Age of Looney Tunes: Volume 3 - MGM/UA Home Video
- Blu-Ray 2026 - Looney Tunes Collector's Vault: Volume 3 (restored) - Warner Archive Collection

== See also ==
- Daffy Duck filmography
- Porky Pig filmography
- Looney Tunes and Merrie Melodies filmography (1930–1939)
- Looney Tunes and Merrie Melodies filmography (1940–1949)

Preceded by Daffy Duck and the Dinosaur	Daffy Duck Cartoons; 1939	Succeeded by Wise Quacks

Preceded by Duck Soup to Nuts	Daffy Duck Cartoons; 1944	Succeeded by Plane Daffy
