= Mucho Locos =

- Directed by: Robert McKimson
- Story by: David Detiege
- Produced by: David H. DePatie; Friz Freleng
- Starring: Mel Blanc
- Edited by: Lee Gunther
- Music by: Herman Stein
- Animation by: Manny Perez; George Grandpré; Bob Matz
- Layouts by: Dick Ung
- Backgrounds by: Tom O'Loughlin
- Color process: Technicolor
- Production company: DePatie–Freleng Enterprises
- Distributed by: Warner Bros. Pictures; The Vitaphone Corporation
- Release date: February 5, 1966
- Running time: 6:00
- Language: English

Mucho Locos is a 1966 Warner Bros. Merrie Melodies cartoon directed by Robert McKimson. The short was released on February 5, 1966, and stars Daffy Duck and Speedy Gonzales.

In the short, Speedy tells another mouse, José, about some of his and Daffy's exploits, which are illustrated by clips from earlier cartoons.

== Plot ==
Sitting in front of a broken television in a junkyard, Speedy Gonzales encourages a young mouse named Jose to watch "imagination TV." "The stupidest creature on Earth has always been the duck," Speedy says, "and the smartest is the mouse." Speedy and Jose imagine the evidence, in the form of scenes from the following cartoons: Robin Hood Daffy, Tortilla Flaps, Deduce, You Say, Mexicali Shmoes, and China Jones.

Daffy has been watching them, and emerges from behind the broken TV and hits Speedy on the head with a mallet. Daffy calls Speedy a stupid mouse and himself a smart duck. Speedy says he will go home now, stating that "this imagination TV gives me the terrible headaches!" Jose says: "It looks so real. Could it be my imagination?"

== Cast and crew ==
Voice cast

- Mel Blanc voices Daffy Duck, Speedy Gonzales, Crow, Cats, Mice

Crew

- New Footage Director: Robert McKimson
- "Mexicali Shmoes" sequence directed by Friz Freleng
- "Robin Hood Daffy" and "Deduce You Say" sequences directed by Chuck Jones
- Additional Story: David Detiege
- "Robin Hood Daffy" and "Deduce You Say" stories by Michael Maltese
- "Tortilla Flaps" and "China Jones" stories by Tedd Pierce (uncredited)
- Uncredited Animation: Arthur Davis, Ken Harris, Abe Levitow, Tom Ray and Ted Bonnicksen

== See also ==
- List of Daffy Duck cartoons
