= Tease for Two =

- Directed by: Robert McKimson
- Story by: David Detiege
- Produced by: David H. DePatie; Friz Freleng
- Starring: Mel Blanc
- Edited by: Lee Gunther
- Music by: Bill Lava
- Animation by: Warren Batchelder; Bob Matz; Manny Perez
- Layouts by: Dick Ung
- Backgrounds by: Tom O'Loughlin
- Color process: Technicolor
- Production company: DePatie–Freleng Enterprises
- Distributed by: Warner Bros. Pictures; The Vitaphone Corporation
- Release date: August 28, 1965
- Running time: 6 minutes
- Language: English

Tease for Two is a 1965 Warner Bros. Looney Tunes directed by Robert McKimson. The short was released on August 28, 1965, and stars Daffy Duck and the Goofy Gophers in their final appearance. The voices were performed by Mel Blanc. The title is a play on the phrase "tea for two."

The cartoon marked the final theatrical appearance of the Goofy Gophers during the original Golden Age of Animation era. Unlike previous Goofy Gophers cartoons where the characters were performed by Blanc and Stan Freberg voiced the Gophers, in this cartoon Blanc performs both parts.

In the film, Daffy is a treasure hunter in search for gold. He tries to have the Gophers abandon their residence in order to search it for gold, but they refuse and fight back.

== Plot ==
The map of treasure hunter Daffy Duck indicates that gold is located at precisely the spot where the Goofy Gophers live. When Mac and Tosh refuse to leave and defend their home, Daffy decides that violent means are needed to involuntarily remove what he considers pests. The Gophers fight back by giving Daffy first explosives, then ordinary rocks painted like gold, the latter of which fools Daffy into thinking he actually struck gold.

== Crew ==
- Director: Robert McKimson
- Story: David Detiege
- Animation: Warren Batchelder, Bob Matz, Manny Perez
- Layout: Dick Ung
- Backgrounds: Tom O'Loughlin
- Film Editor: Lee Gunther
- Voice Characterizations: Mel Blanc
- Music: Bill Lava
- Produced by: David H. DePatie and Friz Freleng

== See also ==
- List of American films of 1965

Preceded by Corn on the Cop	Daffy Duck cartoons 1965	Succeeded by The Astroduck
