= Book Revue =

1946 film by Bob Clampett

- Original title card
- Directed by: Robert Clampett
- Story by: Warren Foster
- Music by: Carl W. Stalling
- Animation by: Robert McKimson; Rod Scribner; Manny Gould; C. Melendez
- Layouts by: Thomas McKimson
- Backgrounds by: Cornett Wood
- Color process: Technicolor
- Production company: Warner Bros. Cartoons
- Distributed by: Warner Bros. Pictures
- Release dates: January 5, 1946 (original); May 19, 1951 (Blue Ribbon reissue)
- Running time: 7:01
- Country: United States
- Language: English

Book Revue is a 1946 Warner Bros. Looney Tunes cartoon directed by Bob Clampett. The cartoon was released on January 5, 1946, and features Daffy Duck.

A semi-remake of Clampett's earlier short A Coy Decoy (1941), it also incorporates plot elements of Frank Tashlin's Speaking of the Weather (1937) and Have You Got Any Castles (1938).

== Plot ==
A collection of books becomes animated after midnight, starting with the Complete Works of Shakespeare, which depicted as clockwork mechanisms to the tune of "My Grandfather's Clock". The narrative transitions to various book covers, including Young Man with a Horn, where a caricature of Harry James begins playing "It Had to Be You" in jazz style. Henry VIII is acting like a seal whilst being interrupted by Alice from The Aldrich Family, by telling him he's a Naughty Boy. An emaciated caricature of Frank Sinatra sings the song amidst the revelry, captivating other book cover characters. A jam session ensues, featuring a variety of characters from different books. Caricatures include; Tommy Dorsey playing a trombone, Gene Krupa with a drum kit, and Benny Goodman playing a clarinet.

Daffy Duck interrupts the festivities and commands the music to stop. He reminisces in an accent akin to Danny Kaye's Russian characters before inadvertently teasing the Big Bad Wolf, who pursues Daffy through various book scenes. The police apprehend the Wolf, who is then sentenced to life by a magazine cover judge. The Wolf flees, but inadvertently falls into the cover of Dante's Inferno with the assistance of Sinatra.

The celebration continues as the characters dance to "Carolina in the Morning", but the Wolf emerges from Dante's Inferno, demanding an end to the dancing.

== Voice cast ==
- Mel Blanc as Daffy Duck / Big Bad Wolf / Cuckoo Clock / Jazz Mice / Sea Wolf / Policeman
- Sara Berner as Alice Aldrich / Farmgirl / Freckles / Mother Goose / Gosling / Whistler’s Mother / Lady in the Dark
- Robert C. Bruce as Henry VIII
- Richard Bickenbach as Frank Sinatra
- The Sportsmen Quartet (Maxwell Smith, John Rarig, Gunnery Bell and Martin Sperzel) as backing vocals

== Influence ==
- Later releases of the short had the title card replaced with Warner Bros.' "Blue Ribbon" title card on which the title was misspelled (see below). The original title card has since been located and the fully restored short can be seen on the Looney Tunes Golden Collection: Volume 2 four-DVD box set, the Looney Tunes Spotlight Collection: Volume 2 two-DVD set and on the Looney Tunes Platinum Collection: Volume 2 Blu-ray set.
- In 1994, it was voted #45 of the 50 Greatest Cartoons of all time by members of the animation field.
- Animaniacs paid tribute to the short in an episode segment titled "Video Review" (first aired on November 23, 1993), which takes place in a video rental store and sees Yakko, Wakko, and Dot facing off against a tyrannosaurus rex who emerges from the cover of a copy of Jurassic Park, in a similar vein to Daffy squaring off against the Big Bad Wolf.
- In 2015, the image of Daffy Duck in a zoot suit became an internet meme on 4chan. Posters will frequently post images of Daffy proclaiming that he is "literally them" or reply to images with sentiments such as "Where did you get this pic of me?". The image later became associated with the anime series Jojo's Bizarre Adventure due to Daffy's similarity to characters from the franchise.
- In the mobile game Looney Tunes World of Mayhem, Daffy appears as Zoot Suit Daffy, with the same outfit used in the short.

== Production notes ==
The film was reissued in 1951, as Book Review. The original title is a pun, as a revue is a variety show, while a review is an evaluation of an artwork; this pun is however not retained in the title of the reissue.

== Reception ==
Animation historian Steve Schneider writes that many of the cartoon's references are dated, "but who cares? ... Better simply to revel in Book Revue's headlong brio, overlapping settings, meticulous economy of gesture, intertwining narratives, resourceful color effects, super-efficient use of screen space—and a great, great turn by a duck called Daffy, as he dances, scat-sings, cavorts, and distorts in one of his true moments of glory... Book Revue is an encyclopedia of what can be done in the animated medium if you're brilliant enough."

== Home Media ==
- VHS 1988 - Cartoon Moviestars: Daffy! (Blue Ribbion) - MGM/UA Home Video
- Laserdisc 1988 - Cartoon Moviestars: Daffy! & Porky! (Blue Ribbion) - MGM/UA Home Video
- Laserdisc 1991 - The Golden Age of Looney Tunes: Volume 1 (Blue Ribbion) - MGM/UA Home Video
- VHS 1992 - The Golden Age of Looney Tunes: Vol. 8 - 1940s Zanies (Blue Ribbion) - MGM/UA Home Video
- VHS 1999 - Looney Tunes: The Collector's Edition, Vol. 7 - Welcome to Wackyland (Blue Ribbion) - Warner Home Video/Columbia House
- DVD 2004 - Looney Tunes Golden Collection: Volume 2 (restored with original titles) - Warner Home Video
- DVD 2004 - Looney Tunes Spotlight Collection Volume 2 (restored with original titles) - Warner Home Video
- DVD 2011 - The Essential Daffy Duck (restored with original titles) - Warner Home Video
- Blu-Ray & DVD 2012 - Looney Tunes Platinum Collection: Volume 2 (restored with original titles) - Warner Home Video
- DVD 2013 - Best of Warner Bros: 50 Cartoon Collection - Looney Tunes (restored with original titles) - Warner Home Video

== See also ==
- Daffy Duck filmography
- Looney Tunes and Merrie Melodies filmography (1940–1949)
