= You Ought to Be in Pictures =

1940 film by Isadore Freleng

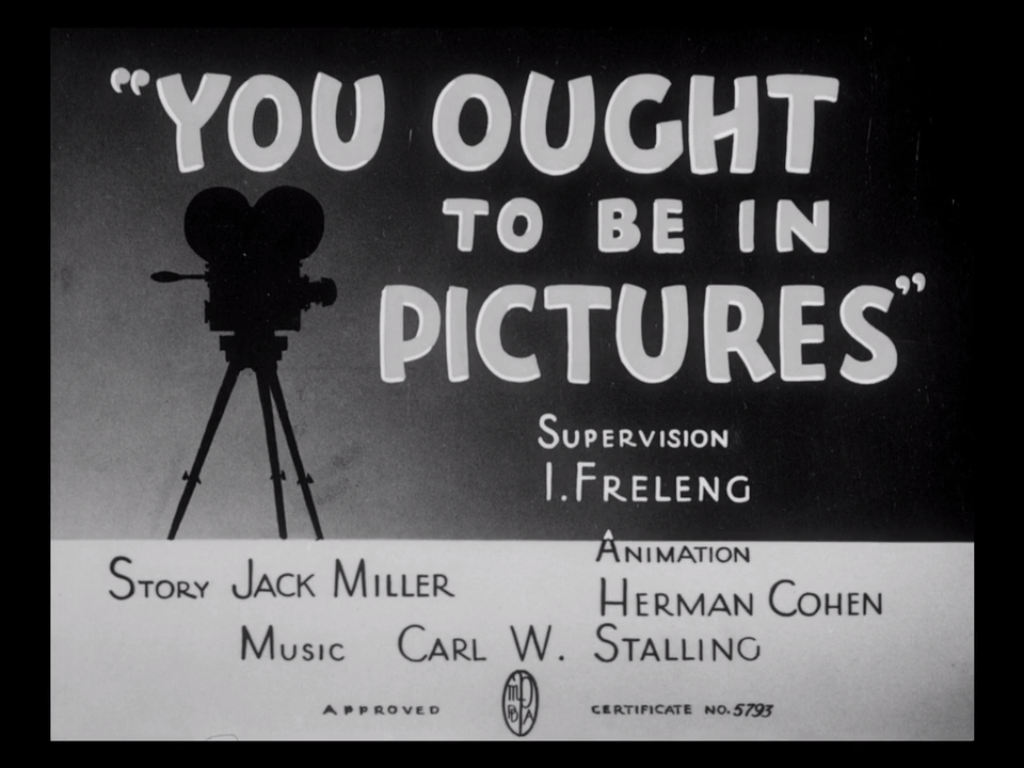
- Title card
- Directed by: I. Freleng
- Story by: Jack Miller
- Produced by: Leon Schlesinger
- Starring: Mel Blanc; Leon Schlesinger; Fred Jones; Chuck Jones; Bob Clampett; Michael Maltese; Gerry Chiniquy; Henry Binder; Paul Marin
- Music by: Carl W. Stalling
- Animation by: Herman Cohen
- Color process: Black-and-white
- Production company: Leon Schlesinger Productions
- Distributed by: Warner Bros. Pictures
- Release date: May 18, 1940
- Running time: 9 min
- Country: United States
- Language: English

You Ought to Be in Pictures is a 1940 American live action-animated comedy short film directed by Isadore Freleng. The cartoon was released on May 18, 1940. It is part of the Looney Tunes series, the 74th cartoon to feature Porky Pig and the eleventh cartoon to feature Daffy Duck.

The film combined live-action and animation, and features live-action appearances by Leon Schlesinger and other staff members. It is one of the longest films in the series, clocking at almost 10 minutes, due to the live-action footage and backgrounds substantially lowering the time and costs required. The title comes from the popular 1934 song "You Oughta Be in Pictures" by Dana Suesse and Edward Heyman, which plays several times throughout the film.

In 2016, it was shortlisted for the 1941 Retro-Hugo Award for Best Dramatic Presentation, Short Form.

== Plot ==
At Leon Schlesinger Productions, the staff working on Looney Tunes and Merrie Melodies cartoons quickly rush off to their lunch break, including series directors Chuck Jones and Bob Clampett. One animator leaves after finishing a sketch of Porky Pig, who is encouraged to quit the studio and pursue a career in feature films as Bette Davis' leading man by a framed drawing of Daffy Duck, who is envious of Porky's status as the cartoons' leading man. Leon Schlesinger willingly lets Porky go, noting that Porky will be back soon.

Porky goes to Warner Bros. Studios Burbank, where he is kicked out by a security guard portrayed by Michael Maltese, who refuses to lose his job by letting Porky in. He successfully enters by impersonating Oliver Hardy, being chased into a film set where a ballroom dance film directed by Gerry Chiniquy is being shot. Porky sneezes and disrupts filming, causing him to be thrown out. Porky is then met with horses running during the shooting of a Western film. He regrets his departure and drives to Leon Schlesinger Productions.

Meanwhile, Daffy Duck attempts to audition for a leading role in cartoons (which he had ironically received in the form of Daffy Duck in Hollywood), singing "Largo al factotum" which fails to impress Schlesinger. As he annoys Schlesinger by insulting Porky and noting his superior qualities, Porky catches him in the act, leading him into a neighboring room and beating him unconscious. Schlesinger gleefully allows Porky to continue work, having tore up a separate document earlier as he anticipated Porky's return. Daffy tries to convince Porky to resign again and work at a dozen grand per week with Greta Garbo at Metro-Goldwyn-Mayer, only to be hit with caramel.

== Cast ==
- Mel Blanc (voice) as Porky Pig, Daffy Duck, Factory Whistle
- Leon Schlesinger as himself
- Fred Jones as the animator
- Chuck Jones as himself (cameo)
- Bob Clampett as himself (cameo)
- Michael Maltese as security guard (dubbed by Mel Blanc)
- Gerry Chiniquy as director (dubbed by Mel Blanc)
- Henry Binder and Paul Marin as stagehands (both dubbed by Mel Blanc)

== Production ==
This film marks Friz Freleng's directorial debut with Daffy Duck upon his return to Leon Schlesinger Productions following a tenure at MGM's cartoon division.

The short features cameos from various studio personnel, including Leon Schlesinger, Chuck Jones, Bob Clampett, Michael Maltese, Gerry Chiniquy, Henry Binder, and Paul Marin. Additionally, the film's runtime, spanning nine minutes and 45 seconds, places it among the longest Looney Tunes cartoons of the Golden Age of Animation, with only Horton Hatches the Egg surpassing it in length.

To manage production costs, the animation team employed minimal special effects, opting instead to integrate live-action footage seamlessly with animation through innovative techniques. Stock footage from the 1936 Western California Mail was repurposed to depict Porky's journey through the studio backlot.

== Legacy ==
Animation historian Jerry Beck writes, "Predating Who Framed Roger Rabbit by several decades — in fact, it's credited with inspiring the 1988 film — You Ought to Be in Pictures is one of the most memorable of the black-and-white-era Porky Pig cartoons. It's also one of the funniest."

== Home media ==
- VHS & Betamax 1985 - Porky Pig's Screwball Comedies - Warner Home Video
- Laserdisc 1993 - Ham on Wry: The Porky Pig Laser Collection - Warner Home Video
- VHS 1999 - Looney Tunes: The Collector's Edition: Vol. 9 - A Looney Life - Warner Home Video/Columbia House
- DVD 2004 - Looney Tunes Golden Collection: Volume 2 (restored) - Warner Home Video
- DVD 2004 - Looney Tunes Spotlight Collection: Volume 2 (restored) - Warner Home Video
- Blu-Ray & DVD 2012 - Looney Tunes Platinum Collection: Volume 2, (restored) - Warner Home Video
- DVD 2017 - Porky Pig 101 (restored) - Warner Archive Collection

== See also ==
- Daffy Duck filmography
- Porky Pig filmography
- Looney Tunes and Merrie Melodies filmography (1940–1949)
