= Duck Amuck =

1953 animated short film by Chuck Jones

- Title card
- Directed by: Charles M. Jones
- Story by: Michael Maltese
- Starring: Mel Blanc
- Music by: Carl Stalling
- Animation by: Ken Harris; Ben Washam; Lloyd Vaughan
- Layouts by: Maurice Noble
- Backgrounds by: Philip DeGuard
- Color process: Technicolor
- Production company: Warner Bros. Cartoons
- Distributed by: Warner Bros. Pictures; Vitaphone
- Release date: February 28, 1953 (United States)
- Running time: 6:53
- Language: English

Duck Amuck is an American animated surreal comedy short film directed by Chuck Jones and written by Michael Maltese. The short was released on February 28, 1953, as part of the Merrie Melodies series, and stars Daffy Duck.

In the cartoon, Daffy Duck is tormented by an unseen and mischievous animator, who constantly alters Daffy's locations, clothing, voice and physical appearance, much to Daffy's aggravation, embarrassment and finally rage. Daffy keeps trying to steer the cartoon back to some kind of normality, only for the animator to either ignore him or, more frequently, over-literally interpret his increasingly frantic demands.

In 1994, Duck Amuck was voted #2 of The 50 Greatest Cartoons of all time by members of the animation field, only behind What's Opera, Doc?, also directed by Jones and written by Maltese. In 1999, Duck Amuck was selected for preservation in the National Film Registry for being "culturally, historically, or aesthetically significant." The short inspired the 2007 Nintendo DS video game Looney Tunes: Duck Amuck.

== Plot ==
The cartoon's title sequence and opening scene suggest Daffy Duck is to star as a musketeer, and he appears, boldly engaging in an action scene with a fencing foil. As he thrusts the foil and advances, the background abruptly disappears, leaving a plain white screen. Confused by this, Daffy turns to the unseen animator and asks the animator to complete the scenery. (Until the end of the cartoon, the animator is not shown; rather, a paintbrush, eraser, or pencil is shown changing the appearance of Daffy or the scenery.) However, the animator fills in a new background that has nothing to do with the previous scene. Daffy returns and starts to repeat his opening scene, but quickly notices the different background and leaves, returning in a different costume and altering his performance to match the new scene. The animator substitutes several different unrelated backgrounds (a barnyard, a snow scene, and Hawaii), each time prompting Daffy to change costumes and sing a relevant song (singing "Old MacDonald Had a Farm" as a farmer, "Jingle Bells" as a skier, and "Aloha ʻOe" as a ukulele player) until the background finally disappears completely again.

While Daffy tries to reason with the animator, he becomes completely erased and, upon asking where he is, he gets redrawn as a cowboy with a guitar. Daffy tries to play it, but there is only silence. Using a sign, he requests sound and is granted various non-guitar sound effects. Daffy also finds himself generating random sound effects when he tries to speak, only finally regaining his voice when he becomes enraged and shouts angrily at the animator "And I've never been so humiliated in all my life!".

Regaining his composure, Daffy demands some new scenery and is given an amateurish line-art cityscape background in pencil. Daffy unpleasantly asks for color, prompting the animator to cover him in various colors and patterns, for which he harshly scolds the animator. All but Daffy's face is erased and, upon asking where the rest of him has gone, he is redrawn as a bizarre mismatched creature. As Daffy walks off, he becomes aware of not feeling quite like himself; the animator creates a mirror and, upon seeing his hideous self, Daffy shrieks in alarm before scolding the animator again. Everything is erased and Daffy is redrawn this time in a sailor suit. Daffy seems to be pleased with this and begins to sing "The Song of the Marines" as the animator draws an ocean scene with an island in the background, but draws nothing under Daffy, resulting in him falling into the ocean and surfacing on the island. When he requests a close-up, the screen contracts around him, at which he says that is not a close-up and screams for a proper close-up; the camera zooms up uncomfortably close to his angry bloodshot eyes. He walks away muttering a sarcastic thanks to the animator.

As Daffy tries once again to negotiate with the animator to have an understanding, a black curtain falls on him. After failing to keep the curtain up, Daffy goes ballistic and rips it apart. Now at the end of his rope, Daffy demands for the cartoon to resume, only to become even more frustrated when the animator attempts to end it. Daffy suggests that he and the animator go their separate ways and, hoping against hope that nothing further will happen, begins a dance routine which is quickly interrupted when the film runs out of alignment, resulting in two Daffys on screen. They argue with each other and almost start a fight, but one Daffy is quickly erased just before the other attempts to get physical.

Daffy is then drawn into an airplane, which he excitedly flies around in until a mountain is drawn in his path. The plane crashes into it, leaving Daffy with nothing but the plane's control column and canopy. He jumps out of the plane's remains and floats downward with his parachute, which is replaced with an anvil. Crashing to the ground, a disoriented Daffy hammers the anvil while dizzily reciting "The Village Blacksmith". The animator changes the anvil into an artillery shell, which explodes after a few more hammer strikes. Daffy finally snaps and angrily demands to know who the animator is, only for the animator to draw a door in front of Daffy and close it on him. The camera pulls back to show the animator's drawing table, and he is revealed to be Bugs Bunny, who says to the audience, "Ain't I a stinker?".

== Voice cast and additional crew ==
- Mel Blanc voices Daffy Duck and Bugs Bunny
- Uncredited Dialogue by Ben Washam
- Uncredited Animation by Abe Levitow and Richard Thompson
- Uncredited Orchestration by Milt Franklyn
- Film Edited by Treg Brown

== History ==
A scene from Duck Amuck.

Duck Amuck is included in the compilation film The Bugs Bunny/Road Runner Movie, along with other Chuck Jones cartoons including What's Opera, Doc?

Mel Blanc performed the voices. It was directed by Chuck Jones from a story by Michael Maltese. The film contains many examples of self-referential humor, breaking the fourth wall. The cartoon's plot was essentially replicated in one of Jones' later cartoons, Rabbit Rampage (1955), in which Bugs Bunny turns out to be the victim of the sadistic animator (Elmer Fudd).

The 1980 television special Daffy Duck's Easter Egg-citement (notably directed & co-produced by Friz Freleng rather than Jones) features similar interactions between Daffy and an unseen animator in the opening credits and bridging sequences. A similar plot was also included in the episode "Duck's Reflucks" of Baby Looney Tunes, in which Bugs was the victim, Daffy was the animator, using a computer instead of pencil and paper. It is done once again with Daffy tormenting Bugs in the New Looney Tunes episode "One Carroter in Search of an Artist" (for this reason, this version has garnered the alternative name "Rabbit Rampage II" among series fans) with the technology updated and the pencil and paintbrush replaced by a digital pen, the victim is Bugs Bunny and the animator is Daffy Duck. The ending of the Looney Tunes Cartoons short "Rage Rover", is a reference to the ending of Duck Amuck.

In issue #94 of the Looney Tunes comic, Bugs Bunny gets back at Daffy Duck by making him the victim, in switching various movie roles, from Duck Twacy in Who Killed Daffy Duck," a video game character, and a talk show host, and they always wind up with Daffy starring in Moby Dick (the story's running gag). After this, Bugs comments, "Eh, dis guy needs a new agent."

A Nintendo DS game was published based upon the short, where the player takes the role of the animator and is tasked with finding ways to anger Daffy. The game's ending, triggered once the player sufficiently enrages Daffy enough, reveals that the animator is another Daffy.

A 2021 segment of the Animaniacs revival series titled "Yakko Amakko" parodies the plot of Duck Amuck, with Yakko Warner explicitly referencing the original 1953 cartoon.

== Reception ==
In 1999, the film was deemed "culturally significant" by the United States Library of Congress and selected for preservation in the National Film Registry. This was the second of three animated shorts by Jones to receive this honor; the others are What's Opera, Doc? (1957) and One Froggy Evening (1955).

Animation historian Greg Ford writes, "The duck glowers directly at the camera, the eye contact always implicating us, the viewers, in the cartoon's gleeful sadism. While Mel Blanc's voice acting is masterful, writer Michael Maltese's gags are great, Maurice Noble's mismatched backgrounds are hilarious, and the Disney-derived yet highly defined 'stop and start' animation executed by Ken Harris is extra crispy here, the film belongs to Chuck Jones. It's as if the misadventures that Jones customarily plunged Daffy into throughout the decade have all converged in Duck Amuck."

== Home media ==
The short was included on Disc 2 of the Looney Tunes Golden Collection: Volume 1 DVD box set (with optional audio commentary by historian Michael Barrier), The Essential Daffy Duck DVD set, and the Looney Tunes Platinum Collection: Volume 1 Blu-ray set.

== See also ==
- Rabbit Rampage, a similar cartoon where Elmer Fudd gets even with Bugs Bunny by being the animator in this short
- Looney Tunes and Merrie Melodies filmography (1950–1959)
- List of Daffy Duck cartoons
- List of Bugs Bunny cartoons

Preceded by Fool Coverage	Daffy Duck Cartoons; 1953	Succeeded by Muscle Tussle
