= Have You Got Any Castles? =

1938 film by Frank Tashlin

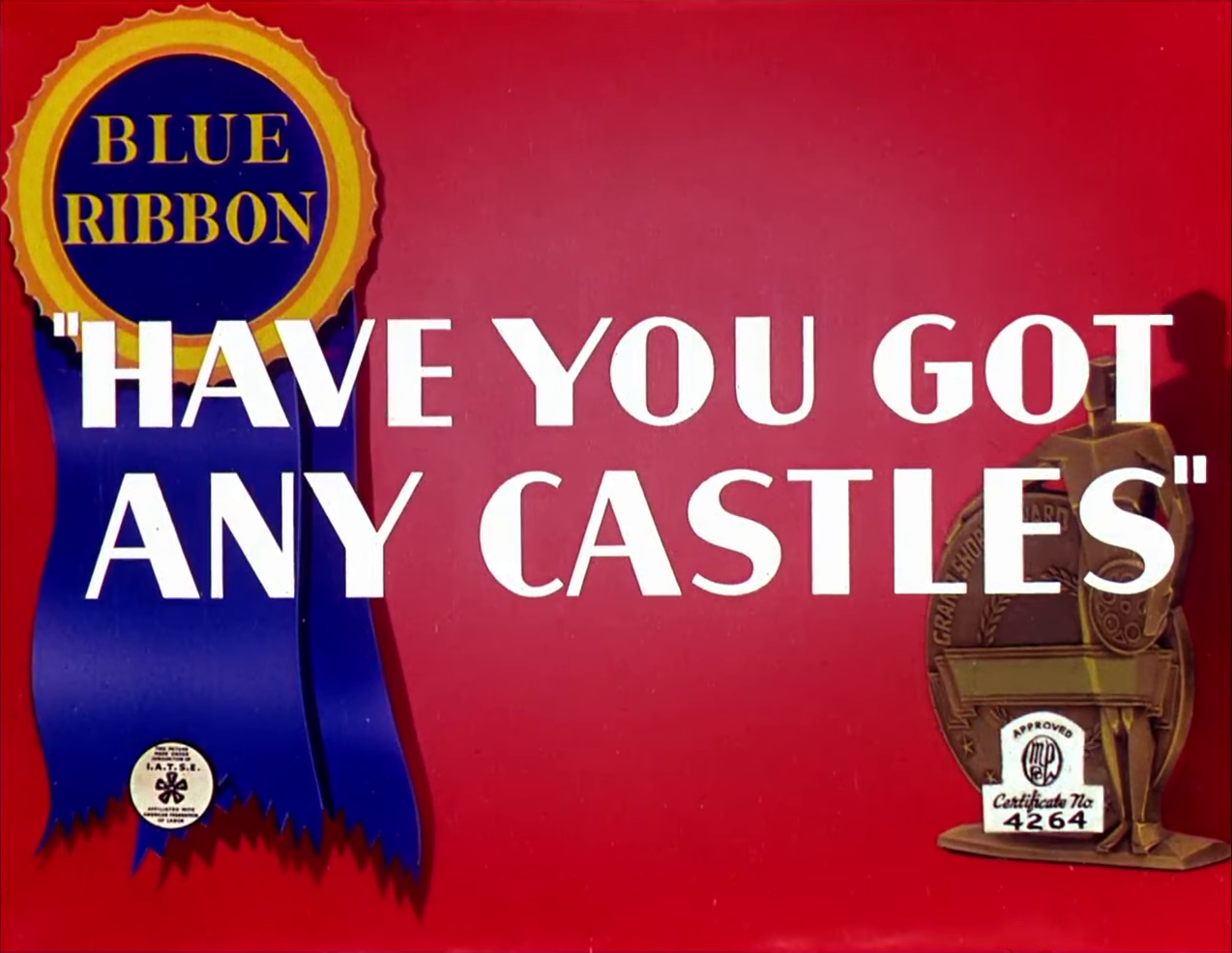
- Blue Ribbon reissue title card
- Directed by: Frank Tashlin
- Story by: Jack Miller
- Produced by: Leon Schlesinger
- Starring: Mel Blanc
- Music by: Carl W. Stalling
- Animation by: Ken Harris
- Color process: Technicolor
- Production company: Leon Schlesinger Productions
- Distributed by: Warner Bros. Pictures; The Vitaphone Corporation
- Release date: June 25, 1938
- Running time: 7 min
- Country: United States
- Language: English

Have You Got Any Castles? is a 1938 American animated comedy short film directed by Frank Tashlin. The short was released on June 25, 1938. It is the 97th film in the Merrie Melodies series, featuring the titular song from the 1937 film Varsity Show. It was re-released as a "Blue Ribbon" reissue in 1947 as Have You Got Any Castles, rendering the original film and credits lost, though scenes caricaturing Alexander Woollcott that were removed upon his request were preserved and restored in home media releases. The cartoon entered the public domain in 1966 when its last rights holder, United Artists (successor-in-interest to Associated Artists Productions), failed to renew the original copyright within the required 28-year period.

== Plot ==
The full short with the Alexander Woollcott scenes restored

At a library, a caricature of Alexander Woollcott's town crier introduces the film. Mr. Hyde, Fu Manchu, the Phantom of the Opera, and Frankenstein's monster introduce themselves by roaring evilly, but then dance happily to Gossec's "Gavotte." As characters from other books applaud that performance, The Good Earth, depicted as a child with a globe as a head, says prayers by his bedside. The camera pans the library to the right, revealing The Invisible Man who dances and hands off to Topper where a similar character continues a similar dance, then moves to The Thirty-Nine Steps where a caricature of "Bojangles" Robinson dances down the steps, So Big with a caricature of Greta Garbo, and The Green Pastures which turns out to feature a big band presentation of "Swing for Sale" led by a caricature of Cab Calloway.

Panning left over the cheering crowd, the camera reveals a singing Heidi on the cover of her eponymous book, a literal Thin Man when viewed from the side (a caricature of William Powell as Nick Charles) walking into the White House Cook Book and, when walking back out and seen from the side, shows that he has packed on some weight in his posterior. Whistler's Mother, on the cover of the book, Great Works of Art whistles "Ain't She Sweet", then three Little Women (three Jane Withers clones) and three Little Men (three Freddie Bartholomew clones) sing with "Old King Cole" (spoofing deep-voiced Warner Bros. character actor Eugene Pallette), the characters of The House of the Seven Gables (seven Clark Gable clones), and a drumming bulldog intended to parody Bulldog Drummond. Next Louis Pasteur (a caricature of Paul Muni in his Oscar-winning role) mixes chemicals from test tubes until they blow up, after which Pasteur is in Seventh Heaven. Also appearing is Captain William Bligh from Mutiny on the Bounty (a caricature of Charles Laughton's portrayal of him). This does not please a sleeping Rip Van Winkle (Ned Sparks, a well-known Hollywood "grouch"), who complains, "Old King Cole is a noisy old soul", while using the Valiant Little Tailor's scissors to snip hair from the title character of Uncle Tom's Cabin to plug his ears.

The music gets louder, as The Three Musketeers (featuring The Ritz Brothers) sing the title song of the cartoon, with Drums Along the Mohawk providing a beat, Emily Post (here portrayed as "Emily Host") scolds Henry VIII of England for his rudeness, and a character from Katherine Mayo's controversial 1927 book Mother India plays along on his pungi. Then Rip again takes scissors from the Tailor and tries to use them once more on Uncle Tom; Tom beats him back then uses the scissors to cut Rip's beard. Then Diamond Jim Brady (an Edward Arnold caricature, from the 1935 film of the same name) comes along pitching mortgage payments as the Drums beat louder, Henry becomes even more gluttonous (and Emily Post joins in the gluttony), and Oliver Twist twists. W. C. Fields (here portrayed with a red nose in a parody of So Red the Rose) joins in, as does Ted Lewis as the Pied Piper of Hamelin, leading mice with a jazzy tune on clarinet.

The Musketeers retrieve a horse from Three Men on a Horse and, along the way grab the Seven Keys to Baldpate which they use to free the Prisoner of Zenda, over Aladdin's objections. Aladdin gets punched out by one of the Men. As the Three Men pass The Informer (a caricature of Victor McLaglen, who won a 1935 Academy Award for playing the role), he whispers to Little Boy Blue (here named "Little Boy Blew") who then trumpets for a Charge of the Light Brigade. Robinson Crusoe fires at the Three Men, along with guns from All Quiet on the Western Front and backup cavalry from Under Two Flags. The incessant noise disturbs Rip, who has had enough of trying to sleep and, as the battling, running characters approach, he opens The Hurricane, so that all of them end up Gone with the Wind (in a play on the then-recent book), blown back to their own books.

After all performances terminate, the Town Crier appears again, concluding the cartoon with a brief message ending with "All is well, all is well ...", and the camera pans back to the cuckoo clock, which Rip silences and sleeps next to.

== Home media ==
- LaserDisc – The Golden Age of Looney Tunes, Volume 1, Side 1
- DVD – Looney Tunes Golden Collection: Volume 2 (with the Alexander Woollcott scenes restored)

== Reception ==
The daily publication The Film Daily called the short a "fine fantasy".

== See also ==
- A Coy Decoy
- Book Revue
