= The Great Piggy Bank Robbery =

1946 animated short film by Bob Clampett

- Directed by: Robert Clampett
- Story by: Warren Foster
- Starring: Mel Blanc
- Music by: Carl W. Stalling
- Animation by: Rod Scribner; Manny Gould; C. Melendez; I. Ellis
- Layouts by: Thomas McKimson
- Backgrounds by: Philip DeGuard
- Color process: Technicolor
- Production company: Warner Bros. Cartoons
- Distributed by: Warner Bros. Pictures, Inc. The Vitaphone Corporation
- Release date: July 20, 1946
- Running time: 7:35
- Language: English

The Great Piggy Bank Robbery is a 1946 Warner Bros. Looney Tunes theatrical cartoon directed by Bob Clampett. The cartoon was released on July 20, 1946, and stars Daffy Duck. The short is Clampett's penultimate Warner cartoon, produced shortly before he left the studio.

== Plot ==
On a farm, Daffy Duck eagerly awaits his new Dick Tracy comic book, rushing to read it as soon as it arrives. Knocking himself out while imagining himself as "Duck Twacy", he embarks on a comical detective adventure. Mistaking ordinary objects for criminals, like a mousehole for the hideout of "Mouse Man", Daffy finds himself pursued by a colorful array of villains, including Snake Eyes, 88 Teeth, Hammerhead, Pussycat Puss, Bat Man, Double Header, Pickle Puss, Pumpkin Head, Neon Noodle, Jukebox Jaw, Wolfman, Flattop, and Rubber Head.

In a chaotic showdown, Daffy manages to outwit the villains with slapstick tactics, including turning Neon Noodle into a neon sign. Finally, he recovers the stolen piggy banks, including his own, and wakes up on the farm, unwittingly kissing a real pig. Recoiling in horror, Daffy flees, leaving the enamored pig declaring her love for him in amusement.

== Voice Cast ==
- Mel Blanc as Daffy Duck / Rubber Head / Neon Noodle / Pig

== Legacy ==
Animation historian Steve Schneider said of this picture:

...Bob Clampett's forever priceless The Great Piggy Bank Robbery is clearly a work of the highest cinematic poetry, for prompting the film's manic hilarity are a sequence of images that remain among the most indelible in cartoon history.

Animator John Kricfalusi (creator of Ren and Stimpy) called The Great Piggy Bank Robbery his favorite cartoon: "I saw this thing and it completely changed my life, I thought it was the greatest thing I'd ever seen, and I still think it is."

The Great Piggy Bank Robbery was the first of several cartoons in which Daffy Duck would do a parody of a well-known character, but the only one in which he was actually competent. In other take-offs, such as The Scarlet Pumpernickel, he was somewhat buffoonish, though still able to intimidate the villains. But, in later stories such as Stuporduck, Boston Quackie, Robin Hood Daffy and Deduce, You Say? (in which he played "Doorlock Holmes"), Daffy was hopelessly outmatched.

In 1994, it was voted No. 16 of the 50 Greatest Cartoons of all time by members of the animation field.

== Home Media ==
- VHS 1988 - Cartoon Moviestars: Daffy! - MGM/UA Home Video
- Laserdisc 1988 - Cartoon Moviestars: Daffy! & Porky! - MGM/UA Home Video
- Laserdisc & VHS 1989 - Cartoons for Big Kids - Turner Home Entertainment
- Laserdisc 1991 - The Golden Age of Looney Tunes: Volume 1 - MGM/UA Home Video
- VHS 1992 - The Golden Age of Looney Tunes: Vol. 4 - Bob Clampett - MGM/UA Home Video
- VHS 1999 - Looney Tunes: The Collector's Edition: Vol. 1 - All Stars - Warner Home Video/Columbia House
- DVD 2004 - Looney Tunes Golden Collection: Volume 2 (restored) - Warner Home Video
- DVD 2004 - Looney Tunes Spotlight Collection: Volume 2 (restored) - Warner Home Video
- DVD 2011 - The Essential Daffy Duck (restored) - Warner Home Video
- Blu-Ray & DVD 2011 - Looney Tunes Platinum Collection: Volume 1 (restored) - Warner Home Video
- Blu-Ray 2012 - Looney Tunes Showcase Volume 1 (restored) - Warner Home Video
- DVD 2013 - Best of Warner Bros: 50 Cartoon Collection - Looney Tunes (restored) - Warner Home Video
- Blu-Ray 2021 - Step by Step (extra, restored) - Warner Home Video

== See also ==
- Looney Tunes and Merrie Melodies filmography (1940–1949)
- Daffy Duck filmography
