= Corn on the Cop =

- Title card
- Directed by: Irv Spector
- Story by: Friz Freleng
- Produced by: David H. DePatie; Friz Freleng
- Starring: Mel Blanc; Joanie Gerber
- Edited by: Lee Gunther
- Music by: Bill Lava
- Animation by: Manny Perez; Warren Batchelder; Bob Matz
- Layouts by: Dick Ung
- Backgrounds by: Tom O'Loughlin
- Color process: Technicolor
- Production company: DePatie–Freleng Enterprises
- Distributed by: Warner Bros. Pictures
- Release date: July 24, 1965
- Running time: 6:25
- Language: English

Corn on the Cop is a 1965 Warner Bros. Merrie Melodies animated short directed by Irv Spector, in his only directorial work on a theatrical cartoon. The short was released on July 24, 1965, and stars Daffy Duck, Porky Pig and Granny.

== Plot ==
On the evening preceding Halloween, Granny engages in the customary preparations for accommodating young visitors seeking confectionery treats. However, her arrangements are disrupted by the sudden appearance of two masked youths, prompting her distress and a call for law enforcement intervention.

Subsequently, an individual disguised as Granny perpetrates a robbery at a local grocery store, mimicking her attire and initiating a pursuit by officers Daffy and Porky. Their attempts to apprehend the perpetrator are hindered by a series of comedic misidentifications, with Granny herself inadvertently becoming involved and mistaking the officers for mischievous trick-or-treaters. Meanwhile, the felon, taking refuge in a nearby vacant residence, successfully evades the efforts of Daffy and Porky, orchestrating diversions to ensure his escape.

Granny eventually identifies the true perpetrator, facilitating his arrest and appropriate punishment. Her commendable actions earn recognition from Officer Flaherty, who acknowledges her pivotal role in resolving the situation. However, Granny's vigilance extends to her misidentification of Daffy and Porky, prompting her to emphasize the need for parental guidance, while refraining from immediate disciplinary action against the officers.

== Notability ==
In Corn on the Cop, Granny, voiced by Joan Gerber instead of June Foray, makes her last appearance in the classic era. This short also discloses Granny's surname, revealed as Webster in the closing scene when addressed by Daffy and Porky's superior officer.

The voices were performed by Mel Blanc (Daffy, Porky and any generic unnamed male voices) and Joanie Gerber (Granny and any generic unnamed female voices). The short is notable for marking Porky Pig's final cartoon appearance during the golden age of American animation (aside from 1966's Mucho Locos, where he appeared in footage reused from Robin Hood Daffy).

The title for this short is a play on the phrase "corn on the cob".

== Crew ==
- Director: Irv Spector
- Story: Friz Freleng
- Animation: Manny Perez, Warren Batchelder, Bob Matz
- Layout: Dick Ung
- Backgrounds: Tom O'Loughlin
- Film Editor: Lee Gunther
- Voice Characterizations: Mel Blanc, Joanie Gerber
- Music: Bill Lava
- Produced by: David H. DePatie and Friz Freleng

== See also ==
- List of American films of 1965
- List of films set around Halloween
