= The Henpecked Duck =

1941 film by Robert Clampett

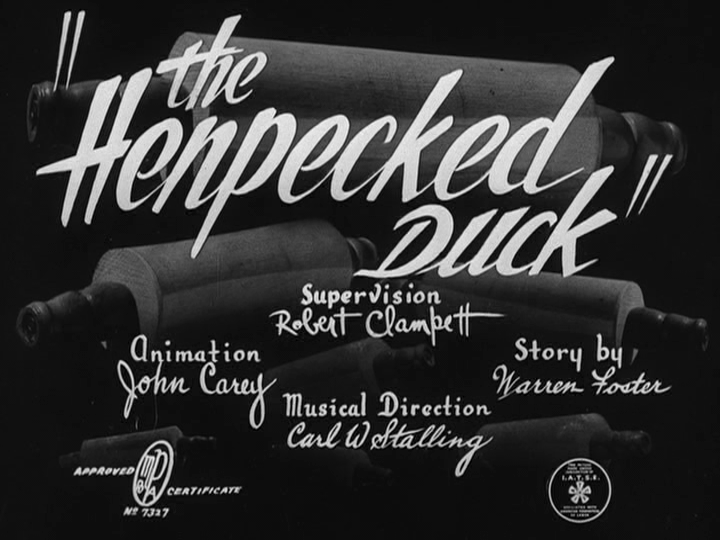
- Title card
- Directed by: Robert Clampett
- Story by: Warren Foster
- Produced by: Leon Schlesinger
- Starring: Mel Blanc; Sara Berner; Robert Clampett (all uncredited)
- Music by: Carl W. Stalling
- Animation by: John Carey
- Color process: Black-and-white
- Production company: Leon Schlesinger Productions
- Distributed by: Warner Bros. Pictures
- Release date: August 30, 1941
- Running time: 7 min
- Country: United States
- Language: English

The Henpecked Duck is a 1941 American animated comedy short film directed by Robert Clampett. The cartoon was released on August 30, 1941. It is part of the Looney Tunes series, the 91st cartoon to feature Porky Pig and the thirteenth cartoon to star Daffy Duck.

== Plot ==
Porky Pig presides as judge over divorce proceedings at the "Court of Inhuman Relations". He calls the case of "Duck vs. Duck". Daffy and Mrs. Duck approach the judge's stand. Mrs. Duck shouts over and over: "I want a divorce!" while also hurling disparaging remarks and insults at Daffy for what led to her decision and not letting him get a word in edgewise to prove his innocence or apologize.

Porky asks her to relate to the court what happened. She explains that she had left Daffy in charge of keeping their egg warm while she visited her mother. Daffy grew bored, so he took the egg and performed a magic trick, causing the egg to disappear and then reappear. Impressed with himself, he tried the trick a second time but was unable to make the egg reappear. Despite countless frantic attempts with his trick, the egg never reappeared. When Mrs. Duck returned home, Daffy had replaced the egg with a door knob, hoping to fool her. She discovers this, and ends her story by shouting "I want a divorce!" again, only extremely close to tears this time instead of in a blind rage.

Porky then sternly asks Daffy what he has to say for himself. Daffy pleads for one more chance to try and get the egg to reappear before Porky goes through with signing off on the divorce papers, and Porky grants his request, to the shock of Mrs. Duck and the courtroom. In tears, he tries the trick again and the egg reappears, much to the court's amazement. The ducks reconcile as the egg immediately hatches. Junior, seated on the judge's podium with his glasses and Porky's gavel, then says, "Case dismissed, step down!", hitting the gavel twice at the end of the cartoon.

== Voice Cast ==
- Mel Blanc as Daffy Duck / Porky Pig / Duckling / Male crowd members ("I want a divorce!")
- Sara Berner as Mrs. Daffy Duck / Hen / Female crowd members ("I want a divorce!")
- Bob Clampett as a crowd member ("Duh... I want a dicorce!") / "Beeyooop" vocal effect

== Home media ==
- DVD 2017 - Porky Pig 101 (remastered) - Warner Archive Collection

== See also ==
- Daffy Duck filmography
- Porky Pig filmography
- Looney Tunes and Merrie Melodies filmography (1940–1949)
- List of animated films in the public domain in the United States

Preceded by A Coy Decoy	Daffy Duck Cartoons; 1941	Succeeded by Conrad the Sailor
