= The Singing Marine =

1937 film by Busby Berkeley, Ray Enright

- Directed by: Ray Enright; Busby Berkeley (musical sequences)
- Written by: Delmer Daves (original screenplay)
- Produced by: Jack L. Warner; Hal B. Wallis
- Starring: Dick Powell; Doris Weston; Lee Dixon
- Cinematography: Arthur L. Todd; Sidney Hickox (uncredited)
- Edited by: Thomas Pratt
- Music by: Heinz Roemheld
- Production company: Warner Bros. Pictures
- Distributed by: Warner Bros. Pictures
- Release date: July 3, 1937
- Running time: 105 minutes
- Country: United States
- Language: English

The Singing Marine is a 1937 American musical film directed by Ray Enright and Busby Berkeley and starring Dick Powell. It was the last of Powell's trio of service-related Warners films: 1934's Flirtation Walk paid tribute, of sorts, to the Army, and 1935's Shipmates Forever to the Navy. This one is distinguished by its two musical sequences directed by Busby Berkeley, and for introducing "The Song of the Marines".

== Plot ==
Robert Brent, a shy rookie private in the Marine Corps from Arkansas, is discovered to have a wonderful singing voice and wins a talent contest in New York City (based on Major Bowes Amateur Hour). The prospect of radio stardom causes him to develop a swollen head; he finds a manager, Aeneas Phinney, starts touring as "the Singing Marine", and hesitates to sail to Shanghai with his unit. Eventually he follows his duty. In Shanghai, the Marines are shown tap dancing in uniform in dance halls and decide to start a nightclub. Brent's agent falsely claims he has been kidnapped by Chinese bandits (i.e., Communists). Brent also wins the heart of Peggy Randall, the restaurant cashier he was too nervous to tell he loves her. The film ends with a mass rendition by the Marines of "The Song of the Marines".

== Cast ==
- Dick Powell as Private Robert Brent
- Doris Weston as Peggy Randall
- Lee Dixon as Corporal Slim Baxter
- Hugh Herbert as Aeneas Phinney / Clarissa
- Jane Darwell as "Ma" Marine
- Allen Jenkins as Sergeant Mike Kelly
- Larry Adler as himself
- Marcia Ralston as Helen Young
- Guinn 'Big Boy' Williams as Dopey
- Veda Ann Borg as Diane
- Jane Wyman as Joan
- Berton Churchill as J. Montgomery Madison
- Eddie Acuff as Sam
- Henry O'Neill as Captain Skinner
- Addison Richards as Felix Fowler
- Unbilled players including Ward Bond, Richard Loo, and Doc Rockwell as himself

== Critical reception ==
Variety described the film as "just a fair musical romance" that was let down by a mediocre storyline. The reviewer commented, "Songs are ok, comedy is pleasing, story is strictly musical comedy and the casting adequate."

Modern Screen’s Leo Townsend described the film as "pleasant, but not startlingly original." He noted Dick Powell’s performance as "smooth and effective, even though the picture around him doesn’t offer the type of support to which he has become accustomed."
