= Assault and Peppered =

- Title card
- Directed by: Robert McKimson
- Story by: John Dunn
- Produced by: David H. DePatie; Friz Freleng
- Starring: Mel Blanc
- Edited by: Lee Gunther
- Music by: Bill Lava
- Animation by: Manny Perez; Warren Batchelder; Bob Matz; Laverne Harding; Norm McCabe; Don Williams
- Layouts by: Dick Ung
- Backgrounds by: Tom O'Loughlin
- Color process: Technicolor
- Production company: DePatie–Freleng Enterprises
- Distributed by: Warner Bros. Pictures; The Vitaphone Corporation
- Release date: April 24, 1965 (US)
- Running time: 6 minutes
- Language: English

Assault and Peppered is a 1965 Warner Bros. Merrie Melodies cartoon directed by Robert McKimson. The short was released on April 24, 1965, and stars Daffy Duck and Speedy Gonzales.

== Description ==
Titled as a play on the term "salt and pepper", Assault and Peppered was released on April 24, 1965. It was directed by Robert McKimson and produced by the award-winning DePatie–Freleng, the production house responsible for the Pink Panther and other series of cartoons distributed by United Artists. Its run time is six minutes. Mel Blanc voiced Daffy Duck, Speedy Gonzales, and the mice.

== Plot ==
The cartoon is a semi-remake of Friz Freleng's Bunker Hill Bunny.

A group of starving mice are admiring Daffy Duck's Mexican plantation (aptly named El Rancho Rio Daffy), all the while wishing to have some of his homegrown food. Evil land baron Daffy, who isn't particularly fond of beggars, suddenly appears and angrily whips the mice for "starving on his property". He claims that "It lowers the value!" Unfortunately, Speedy Gonzales interrupts and startles Daffy. Daffy challenges Speedy to a duel, and they proceed to do battle in private forts, described by Daffy as doing it in "the grand manner".

In his fort, Speedy attempts to come up with a secret plan. When Daffy attempts to spy on him with a large telescope, Speedy berates him for it ("Hey! Is no fair to spy, that's cheating!") and pokes his end of the telescope, which on Daffy has the same effect of being poked in his eye. Daffy retaliates by firing the first shot from his cannon, which flies through Speedy's fort. Speedy redirects it towards Daffy, and runs towards his fort, informing him that his cannonball is returning before it hits Daffy. Speedy remarks "Cannonballs are very expensive. They shouldn't be wasted."

Daffy threatens to fire another cannonball at Daffy despite Speedy's protests ("But that's no fair! I got no cannonballs!") Daffy attempts to fire, claiming he'll send some cannonballs over to Speedy, but his cannon flips over and fires on him.

Speedy then goes to Daffy's fort and asks to borrow a cannonball. Daffy attempts to fire one at point-blank, but Speedy climbs inside and absconds with it, back to his fort. Daffy runs after him to force him to give it back, but Speedy fires it at Daffy, sending him inside his cannon, which likewise fires and sends Daffy and the cannonball back to Speedy's fort. Speedy retakes the cannonball from an injured Daffy.

Daffy then plants landmines across the area between both forts, but Speedy steals the chart showing where the mines are. Speedy promises to tell Daffy where they are so he can get back to his own fort, but he only reveals where each one is after Daffy steps on them, repeatedly blowing himself up. Speedy then asks "What you mean, you don't know where they are? You haven't missed one yet!", but Daffy tells Speedy to shut up as he collapses at his fort entrance.

In the end, Speedy (tired from doing battle with Daffy) quits and goes home. Daffy then declares victory and rewards himself with a 21 gun salute. Unfortunately, as he pulls the strings to fire his cannons, the cannons flip in his direction ("Mother!") and blast him one-by-one, with Speedy observantly keeping count (meaning that Speedy effectively still won the war).

== See also ==
- List of American films of 1965
- The Golden Age of American animation
- List of Daffy Duck cartoons
