= The Daffy Doc =

1938 film by Robert Clampett

- Title card
- Directed by: Robert Clampett
- Produced by: Leon Schlesinger
- Starring: Mel Blanc
- Music by: Carl W. Stalling
- Animation by: John Carey; Vive Risto
- Color process: Black-and-white
- Production company: Leon Schlesinger Productions
- Distributed by: Warner Bros. Pictures; The Vitaphone Corporation
- Release date: November 26, 1938
- Running time: 7 min
- Country: United States
- Language: English

The Daffy Doc is a 1938 American animated comedy short film directed by Bob Clampett. The cartoon was released on November 26, 1938. It is part of the Looney Tunes series, the 49th cartoon to feature Porky Pig and the fifth cartoon to star Daffy Duck.

== Plot ==
Dr. Quack and Dr. Daffy Duck, unqualified doctors who partake in quackery at the Stitch in Time hospital, prepare for a surgery while numerous people watch. Daffy is ordered to be quiet and almost holds in his urges to make noise. He is made to pass a number of tools at an impossible speed, leading him to give up at some point, throw the apparatus in the air and use apparatus as a punching bag. As punishment for disrupting the process, he is thrown out and is stuck in an iron lung, which causes his body to expand in various ways before his hands explode. It is revealed that Dr. Quack was stitching a football during the process, which he plays with to the audience's applause.

Wanting to "cure" a patient, Daffy finds Porky Pig passing by, stalks him and knocks him out with a mallet. He gives Porky a lollipop while he rests in bed, then whacks himself with a mallet to converse with two hallucinated clones, coming to a decision that he should saw Porky in half to Porky's horror. They chase and accidentally fall into the iron lung again, causing them to inflate.

== Voice Cast ==
- Mel Blanc as Daffy Duck / Porky Pig / Dr. Quack

It is currently unknown who provided the voice of the receptionist.

== Home media ==
- VHS 1985 - Daffy Duck: The Nuttiness Continues - Warner Home Video
- DVD 2005 - Room Service (extra, unrestored) - Warner Home Video
- DVD 2007 - Looney Tunes Golden Collection: Volume 5 (restored) - Warner Home Video
- DVD 2011 - The Essential Daffy Duck (restored) - Warner Home Video
- DVD 2017 - Porky Pig 101 (restored) - Warner Archive Collection
- Blu-Ray 2025 - The Citadel (extra, restored) - Warner Archive Collection

== See also ==
- Daffy Duck filmography
- Porky Pig filmography
- Looney Tunes and Merrie Melodies filmography (1930–1939)

Preceded by Daffy Duck & Egghead	Daffy Duck Cartoons; 1938	Succeeded by Daffy Duck in Hollywood
