= Nasty Quacks =

- Title card
- Directed by: Frank Tashlin (uncredited)
- Story by: Warren Foster
- Starring: Mel Blanc; Sara Berner (uncredited); Robert C. Bruce (uncredited)
- Music by: Carl W. Stalling
- Animation by: Art Davis; I. Ellis; Richard Bickenbach; Anatolle Kirsanoff (uncredited)
- Layouts by: Bob Givens
- Backgrounds by: Richard H. Thomas
- Color process: Technicolor
- Production company: Warner Bros. Cartoons
- Distributed by: Warner Bros. Pictures; The Vitaphone Corporation
- Release date: December 1, 1945
- Running time: 7:08
- Language: English

Nasty Quacks is a Warner Bros. Merrie Melodies cartoon directed by Frank Tashlin, released on December 1, 1945, and starring Daffy Duck.

== Plot ==
In a suburban household, a father gifts his daughter, Agnes, a black duckling that soon matures into the infamous Daffy Duck. Daffy's disruptive antics test the father's patience, but Agnes staunchly defends her beloved pet. The father's frustration escalates, leading to a comical chase around the house, until he hits upon a plan to distract Agnes with a new, cute yellow duckling. Determined to eliminate his rival, Daffy stalks the duckling with an axe but decides he can't kill the little one, instead intending to accelerate their growth with vitamins before taking them down. Unexpectedly, the duckling transforms into a grown, white female duck, leaving Daffy stunned. The joyous father's celebration is short lived when he discovers Daffy cohabiting peacefully with the new duck and their offspring, ending the tale with Daffy's characteristic storytelling.

== Voice Cast ==
- Mel Blanc as Daffy Duck / Father / Baby
- Sara Berner as Agnes (uncredited)
- Robert C. Bruce as The Narrator (uncredited)

== Reception ==
This was the final Daffy Duck cartoon, and the second to last overall, directed by Tashlin. The director is not credited as he had already left the studio. The voices of the male characters are performed by Mel Blanc. The film also introduced a love interest for Daffy.

Animation historian Greg Ford writes, "A comparison might be made to the plot of the hit play The Man Who Came to Dinner, in which an insufferable dinner guest becomes incapacitated and overstays his welcome for endless, grueling months. Daffy, as Warner Bros.' blue-collar answer to George S. Kaufman and Moss Hart's patrician wordsmith Sheridan Whiteside, terrorizes the household not with acerbic putdowns but exuberant, palsy-walsy camaraderie... One of the cartoon's funniest bits finds the borderline bratty Agnes swooshing in to Daffy's defense before her father does the duck corporal harm. While other animation directors showed an antsy reluctance to caricature females, Tashlin distinguished himself as an equal-opportunity exaggerator."

== Home media ==
- VHS 1986 - Viddy-Oh! For Kids Cartoon Festivals: Daffy Duck Cartoon Festival Featuring "Daffy Duck and the Dinosaur" - MGM/UA Home Video
- VHS 1988 - Cartoon Moviestars: Just Plain Daffy - MGM/UA Home Video
- Laserdisc 1991 - The Golden Age of Looney Tunes: Volume 1 - MGM/UA Home Video
- VHS 1992 - The Golden Age of Looney Tunes: Vol. 9 - 1940s Zanies - MGM/UA Home Video
- DVD 2010 - Looney Tunes Super Stars' Daffy Duck: Frustrated Fowl (restored) - Warner Home Video
- DVD 2011 - The Essential Daffy Duck (restored) - Warner Home Video
- Blu-Ray & DVD 2014 - Looney Tunes Platinum Collection: Volume 3 (restored) - Warner Home Video

== See also ==
- Daffy Duck filmography
- Looney Tunes and Merrie Melodies filmography (1940–1949)
