= The Song of the Marines =

Song
- Published: 1937
- Genre: Military march
- Composer: Harry Warren
- Lyricist: Al Dubin

"The Song of the Marines" is a song composed by Harry Warren with lyrics by Al Dubin. It was featured in the 1937 Warner Bros. film, The Singing Marine where it was sung by actor Dick Powell.

Later, Warner Bros. Cartoons used the song in several shorts, including the Porky Pig short Porky the Gob (1938). A shortened version (replacing the lines "It may be Shanghai, farewell and goodbye" with "We're leaving today, it's anchors aweigh") was sung several times in the Daffy Duck cartoon Conrad the Sailor (1942) and several opening bars of it in Duck Amuck (1953), plus the Sylvester and Tweety cartoon Snow Business (1953)

In 1962, Dick Powell, star of The Singing Marine, reprised the song in a cameo appearance in the Ensign O'Toole episode "Operation Benefit", a TV series owned by his production company, Four Star Television. It was one of his final filmed appearances.

== Lyrics ==
The version in The Singing Marine has these lyrics:

Over the sea, let's go men
We're shovin' right off, we're shovin' right off again
Nobody knows where or when
We're shovin' right off, we're shovin' right off again
It may be Shanghai
Farewell and goodbye
Sally and Sue, don't be blue
We'll just be gone for years and years and then
We're shovin' right off for home, shovin' right off for home again

Bridge:

There's gotta be pork
There's gotta be beans
In order to fill up and fatten the fighting Marines
The mighty Marines
We carry all our vitamins inside a little can
For corned beef is a delicacy in China or Japan
And so, we're ready to go, wherever we go
We know that we go prepared
To fight the foe or see that we keep them scared
On land, we always land a bit of femininity
And then we hear the bugle blow
And where the heck are we?

The chorus is repeated up through "farewell and goodbye," except that "shovin' right off" is replaced by "sailin' away." This is followed by the first four lines of the Marines' Hymn, then the original chorus is repeated, but with "shovin' right off for home" repeated a third time in the last line.

There is a recording by Dennis Day that begins with the bridge, replacing "in China or Japan" with "of every fighting man," then the chorus, then a repeat of the last few lines of the chorus, changed to:

On land or at sea
Wherever we'll be
Sally and Sue, don't be blue
We'll have a go at Tokyo and then
We're shovin' right off for home, shovin' right off for home,
shovin' right off for home again
