= Porky's Last Stand =

1939 film by Robert Clampett

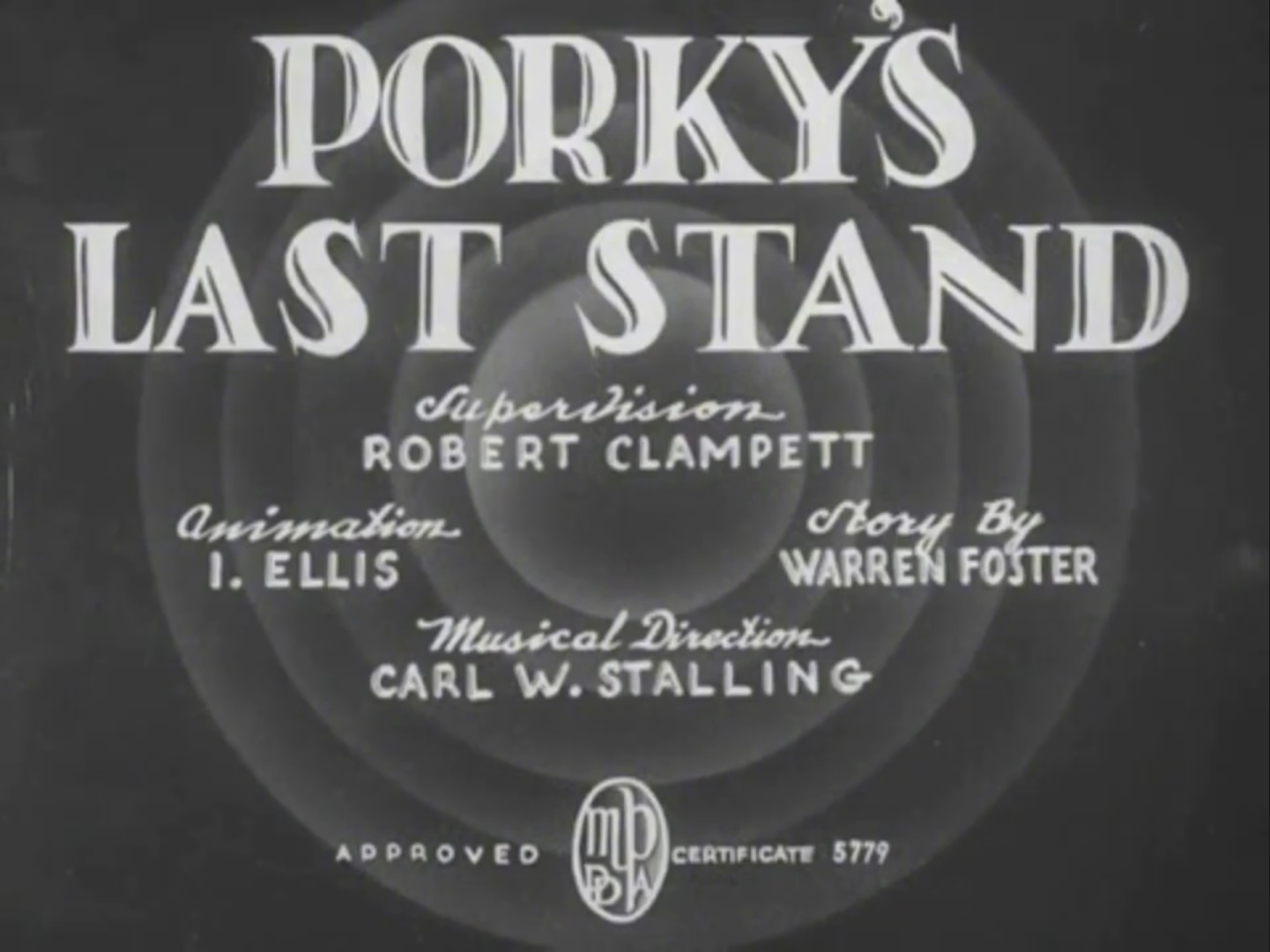
- Title card
- Directed by: Robert Clampett
- Story by: Warren Foster
- Produced by: Leon Schlesinger
- Starring: Mel Blanc; Robert C. Bruce; The Rhythmettes
- Music by: Carl W. Stalling
- Animation by: Isadore Ellis
- Production company: Leon Schlesinger Productions
- Distributed by: Warner Bros. Pictures
- Release date: December 29, 1939
- Running time: 6 min
- Country: United States
- Language: English

Porky's Last Stand is a 1939 American animated comedy short film directed by Robert Clampett. The cartoon was released on December 29, 1939. It is part of the Looney Tunes series, the 69th cartoon to feature Porky Pig and the tenth cartoon to star Daffy Duck.

== Plot ==
Porky Pig operates the titular food stand, where his chickens hatch eggs while he cooks pancakes. Daffy Duck washes dishes with his buttocks and shatters some. He attempts to serve a hamburger to a guest, but finds that the mice ate them all. Porky does not realize as he makes readily available coffee and eggs for another guest, but accidentally cooks a chick who escapes promptly.

Daffy despairs about the order and finds a calf grazing outside, which he follows with a mallet in an attempt to kill it for meat. He ends up accidentally dragging a bull, which he angers and runs from. Porky notices the bull after Daffy returns and slams him with the door. As retaliation, the bull charges at the stand and Porky, who jumps into a tree to no avail. Daffy distracts the bull with a red cape like a bullfighter, only for Porky to obliviously hide behind the cape. Daffy escapes and Porky digs underground while the bull runs into the stand, causing him to be trapped by debris while the chickens play on a wheel and pluck his nose ring which regrows after each pluck.

== Voice Cast ==
- Mel Blanc as Daffy Duck / Porky Pig / Chickens / Duckling / Bull
- Robert C. Bruce as Angry Customer
- The Rhythmettes as opening chorus singing Start the Day Right

== Home media ==
- DVD 2008 - All This and Heaven Too (extra, unrestored) - Warner Home Video
- DVD 2017 - Porky Pig 101 (remastered) - Warner Archive Collection

== See also ==
- Daffy Duck filmography
- Porky Pig filmography
- Looney Tunes and Merrie Melodies filmography (1930–1939)
