= Muscle Tussle =

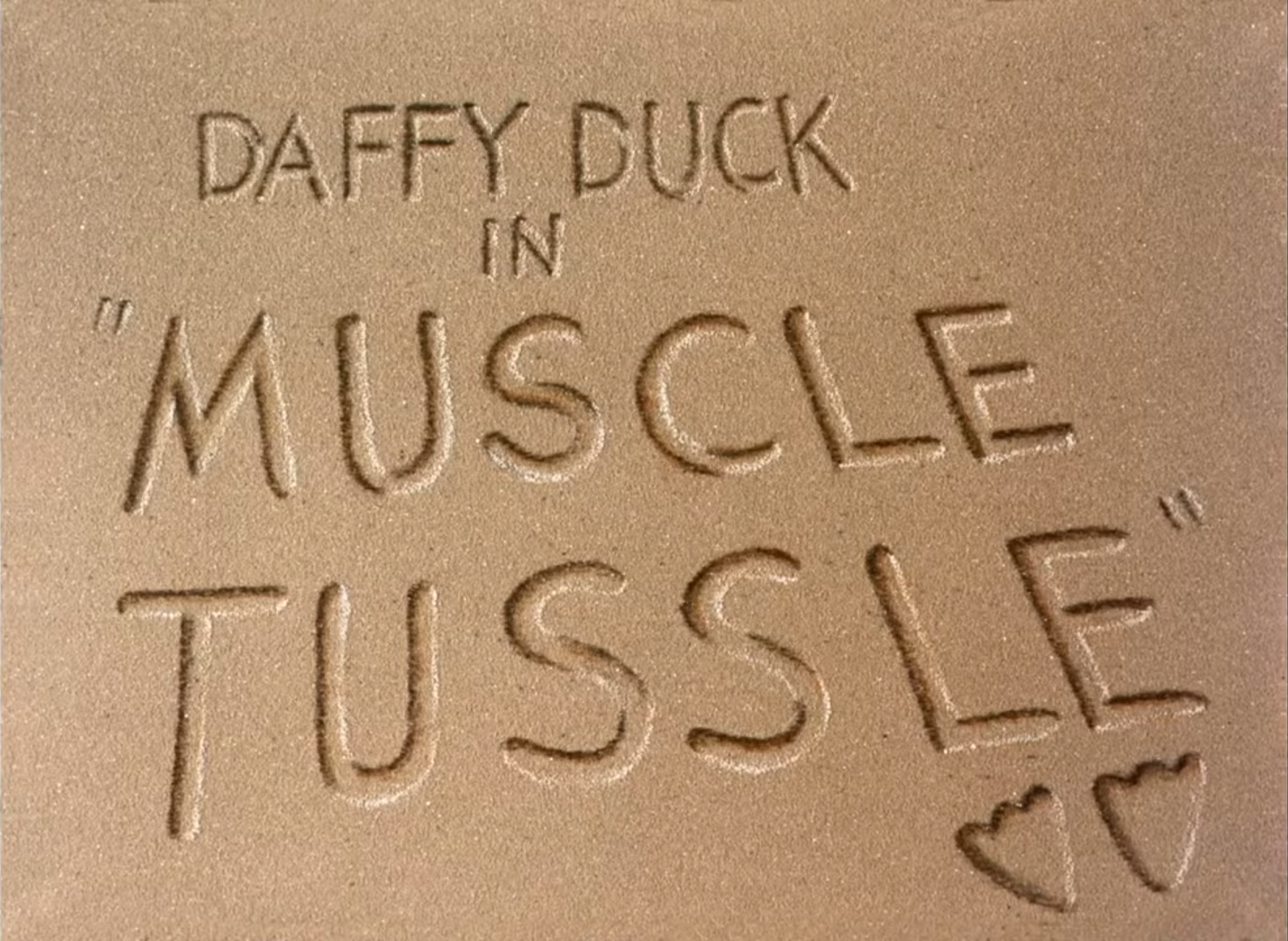
- Title card
- Directed by: Robert McKimson
- Story by: Tedd Pierce
- Starring: Mel Blanc; Gladys Holland (uncredited)
- Music by: Carl Stalling
- Animation by: Rod Scribner; Phil DeLara; Charles McKimson; Herman Cohen; Keith Darling (uncredited)
- Layouts by: Robert Givens
- Backgrounds by: Carlos Manriquez
- Color process: Technicolor
- Production company: Warner Bros. Cartoons
- Distributed by: Warner Bros. Pictures
- Release date: April 18, 1953
- Running time: 7:00
- Language: English

Muscle Tussle is a 1953 Warner Bros. Merrie Melodies theatrical cartoon short directed by Robert McKimson. The cartoon was released on April 18, 1953 and stars Daffy Duck.

== Synopsis ==
Daffy goes to the beach with his girlfriend, who bears a strong resemblance to Veronica Lake (voiced by an uncredited Gladys Holland), and prepares to take her picture. While posing, she sees a muscle-bound duck and turns her attention toward him. An outraged Daffy confronts the muscle-bound duck (a soft-spoken yet still arrogant fellow) for attempting to steal his girl. He replies that he'll bob Daffy so hard he'll have to open his vest to eat if he says one more word. Daffy takes the threat rather lightly, and the muscle-bound duck proceeds to hit Daffy so hard that his head sinks into his stomach. In a daze, Daffy orders "One cheeseburger, hold the onions".

The female duck urges Daffy to fight back, but he backs down knowing the size of his opponent. Disgusted by his cowardice, the female duck goes off with the muscle-bound duck and bids Daffy farewell, calling him a "scrawny little nine-pound weakling" which offends Daffy as he considers himself a "scrawny little ten-pound weakling." A glad-handed traveling salesman who happens to be nearby overhears the whole thing and sells Daffy some muscle tonic (actually hot mustard), which he thinks has made him as strong as the muscle-bound duck and just might help him win back his girl. Daffy repeatedly falls short in his attempts to demonstrate his strength, but through a fluke (and one of the salesman's props, a "five thousand-pound" barbell), manages to dispose of his rival in the end. The muscle-bound duck lifts the "barbell" which sends him rocketing thousands of feet into the air. When he plummets back to Earth now squashed from the impact, he tells the couple "You all can call me shorty!", and waddles off. With that, the female duck takes Daffy back saying she likes her man “tall, dark and gruesome”.

== Home media ==
- DVD - Trouble Along the Way (unrestored)
- Blu-Ray - Looney Tunes Collector's Choice: Volume 4 (restored)

== Censorship ==
- The ABC version of this cartoon cuts the part where the big, muscular duck pounds Daffy's head into his shirt.

Preceded by Duck Amuck	Daffy Duck Cartoons; 1953	Succeeded by Duck! Rabbit, Duck!
