= Conrad the Sailor =

1942 film by Charles M. Jones

- Title card
- Directed by: Charles M. Jones
- Story by: Dave Monahan
- Produced by: Leon Schlesinger
- Starring: Mel Blanc; Pinto Colvig
- Music by: Carl W. Stalling
- Animation by: Ben Washam
- Color process: Technicolor
- Production company: Leon Schlesinger Productions
- Distributed by: Warner Bros. Pictures
- Release date: February 28, 1942
- Running time: 7 min
- Country: United States
- Language: English

Conrad the Sailor is a 1942 American animated comedy short film directed by Charles M. Jones. It was released on February 28, 1942. It is part of the Merrie Melodies series and the fourteenth cartoon to star Daffy Duck. It is infamous for featuring Pinto Colvig voicing Conrad Cat (his third and final appearance) in a similar manner to Goofy.

== Plot ==
Conrad Cat works as a janitor on a battleship mostly crewed by anthropomorphic dogs and sing "The Song of the Marines". As Conrad swabs the deck, he is interrupted by Daffy Duck, who deliberately sabotages Conrad's efforts out of malice. He deliberately swaps Conrad's water bucket with a bucket of red paint, causing Conrad to paint the deck. Conrad angrily throws the mop at Daffy, who then throws it on Conrad's head and twisting him. Conrad finally gets fed up with Daffy, and proceeds to chase him, but Daffy outsmarts him at every turn from hiding in a lifeboat and after Conrad mistakes him for a telescope, keeping watch for Daffy. A running gag in the film is that all action screeches to a halt whenever the ship's diminutive Admiral walks by, as both sailor and duck snap to attention and salute. Conrad shoots a shell which follows him and Daffy, then chases them into the ocean after saluting the Admiral.

== Voice Cast ==
- Mel Blanc as Daffy Duck
- Pinto Colvig as Conrad Cat
- Vocal Group consisting of William Days, Maxwell Smith, John Rarig, Thurl Ravenscroft and Paul Taylor singing The Song of the Marines.

== Home media ==
- VHS 1986 - Viddy-Oh For Kids Cartoon Festivals: Daffy Duck Cartoon Festival Featuring "Ain't That Ducky" - MGM/UA Home Video
- VHS 1990 - Cartoon Moviestars: Daffy Duck and Company - MGM/UA Home Video
- Laserdisc 1993 - The Golden Age of Looney Tunes: Volume 4 - MGM/UA Home Video
- DVD 2006 - Looney Tunes Golden Collection: Volume 4 (restored) - Warner Home Video
- DVD 2006 - Looney Tunes Spotlight Collection: Volume 4 (restored) - Warner Home Video
- Blu-Ray 2026 - Looney Tunes Collector's Vault: Volume 3 (restored) - Warner Archive Collection

== See also ==
- Looney Tunes and Merrie Melodies filmography (1940–1949)
- Daffy Duck filmography

Preceded by The Henpecked Duck	Daffy Duck Cartoons; 1942	Succeeded by Daffy's Southern Exposure
