= The Astroduck =

- Directed by: Robert McKimson
- Produced by: David H. DePatie; Friz Freleng
- Starring: Mel Blanc
- Edited by: Lee Gunther
- Music by: Bill Lava
- Animation by: Bob Matz; Manny Perez; Warren Batchelder; Don Williams; George Grandpré; Norm McCabe
- Layouts by: Dick Ung
- Backgrounds by: Tom O'Loughlin
- Color process: Technicolor
- Production company: DePatie–Freleng Enterprises
- Distributed by: Warner Bros. Pictures; The Vitaphone Corporation
- Release date: January 1, 1966
- Running time: 6 minutes
- Language: English

The Astroduck is a 1966 Warner Bros. Looney Tunes cartoon directed by Robert McKimson. The short was released on January 1, 1966, and stars Daffy Duck and Speedy Gonzales.

== Synopsis ==
Daffy rents a house from a realtor in Mexico, but Speedy, claiming that his Gonzales family has lived there for many generations, will not leave. The rodent remains stubborn as Daffy tries nailed signs, a mallet, a sewer rooter, a shotgun, a plunger, a hand grenade, and many sticks of dynamite. At the end Daffy blows the house sky-high and Speedy says, "We got a new astroduck!"

== See also ==
- List of American films of 1966
- The Golden Age of American animation
- List of Daffy Duck cartoons
