= The Essential Daffy Duck =

- DVD cover
- Directed by: Chuck Jones; Tex Avery; Bob Clampett; Friz Freleng; Frank Tashlin; Greg Ford; Terry Lennon; Kent Butterworth; Rich Moore; Spike Brandt; Tony Cervone
- Starring: Daffy Duck; Mel Blanc (voice)
- Distributed by: Warner Home Video
- Release date: November 1, 2011
- Country: United States
- Language: English

The Essential Daffy Duck is a DVD set of cartoons featuring Daffy Duck. It was released on November 1, 2011.

== Contents ==
The contents are split over two discs. The first disc features 15 classic Daffy Duck shorts (14 of which were previously released on the Looney Tunes Golden Collection sets or Frustrated Fowl plus his debut cartoon, Porky's Duck Hunt, which makes its DVD debut). The second disc features more recent shorts and TV appearances.

=== Disc 1 ===
#	Title	Co-stars	Release date	Director	Series
1	Porky's Duck Hunt	Porky	April 17, 1937	Tex Avery	LT
2	Daffy Duck & Egghead	Egghead	January 1, 1938	Tex Avery	MM
3	The Daffy Doc	Porky	November 26, 1938	Bob Clampett	LT
4	Plane Daffy	Hatta Mari	September 16, 1944	Frank Tashlin	LT
5	The Great Piggy Bank Robbery	Porky (cameo)	July 20, 1946	Bob Clampett	LT
6	Nasty Quacks	Melissa	December 1, 1945	Frank Tashlin	MM
7	Book Revue	The Big Bad Wolf	January 5, 1946	Bob Clampett	LT
8	Duck Amuck	Bugs (cameo)	February 28, 1953	Chuck Jones	MM
9	Duck Dodgers in the 24½th Century	Porky, Marvin	July 25, 1953	Chuck Jones	MM
10	The Scarlet Pumpernickel	Porky, Sylvester, Elmer, Henery, Melissa, Mama Bear	March 4, 1950	Chuck Jones	LT
11	My Little Duckaroo	Porky, Nasty Canasta	November 27, 1954	Chuck Jones	MM
12	A Star Is Bored	Bugs, Elmer, Sam	September 15, 1956	Friz Freleng	LT
13	Deduce, You Say!	Porky, Shropshire Slasher	September 29, 1956	Chuck Jones	LT
14	Ali Baba Bunny	Bugs	February 9, 1957	Chuck Jones	MM
15	Robin Hood Daffy	Porky	March 8, 1958	Chuck Jones	MM

=== Disc 2 ===
Content	Release date	Type	Previous DVD release	Director
The Duxorcist	November 22, 1987	Short	Space Jam 2-Disc Special Edition	Greg Ford
The Night of the Living Duck	September 23, 1988	Short	Space Jam 2-Disc Special Edition	Greg Ford; Terry Lennon
Duck Dodgers Jr.	February 4, 1991	Segment from the Tiny Toon Adventures episode "The Return of the Acme Acres Zone"	Tiny Toon Adventures: Season 1, Volume 2	
Superior Duck	August 23, 1996	Short	Daffy Duck's Quackbusters	Chuck Jones
Attack of the Drones	2004	Short	Australian edition of Looney Tunes: Back in Action	Rich Moore
The Green Loontern	October 18, 2003	Episode from the Duck Dodgers TV series	Green Lantern: First Flight	
Daffy Duck for President	2004	Short	Looney Tunes Golden Collection: Volume 2 (bonus feature)	Spike Brandt; Tony Cervone

=== Special features ===
- All-New Career Profile – Daffy Duck: Ridicule Is the Burden of Genius
- 2 vintage TV programs:
  - Daffy Duck's Easter Special
  - Daffy Duck's Thanks-for-Giving Special (sped-up PAL master)
