= Daffy Duck in Hollywood =

1938 film by Fred Avery

- Title card
- Directed by: Fred Avery
- Story by: Dave Monahan
- Produced by: Leon Schlesinger
- Starring: Mel Blanc; Rolfe Sedan; Sara Berner; Jim Bannon
- Music by: Carl W. Stalling
- Animation by: Virgil Ross
- Color process: Technicolor
- Production company: Leon Schlesinger Productions
- Distributed by: Warner Bros. Pictures; The Vitaphone Corporation
- Release date: December 12, 1938
- Running time: 8 min
- Country: United States
- Language: English

Daffy Duck in Hollywood is a 1938 American animated comedy short film directed by Fred Avery. The cartoon was released on December 12, 1938. It is part of the Merrie Melodies series and the sixth cartoon to star Daffy Duck. The short is Avery's last Daffy Duck cartoon.

== Plot ==
At Wonder Studios, producer I.M. Stupendous quickly refuses Daffy Duck's request for an acting role, only for the phone to ring and reveal Daffy, who emerges to pinch his nose. Stupendous then "phones" director von Hamburger (a parody of Josef von Sternberg) in a face-to-face conversation and orders him to finish the romance film he's working on that day, which Daffy decides to disrupt.

On the set, all the crew rushes to follow Hamburger's order for a close-up, who starts smoking a cigarette. Daffy then swipes and starts smoking the cigarette, spelling out Warner Bros. with the smoke. Hamburger asks how the sound is, and Daffy whistles into the microphone which gives a bad reaction to the crew member checking it. He orders the lights turned which Daffy has connected the emergency fire hose to, causing water to gush out of the lights and down on the set where the actors are, disrupting the filming process. Daffy then plants bullets in the camera. When the camera rolls on Hamburger's orders, it starts shooting bullets. Hamburger begins crying while stating "This isn't a gangster picture!" Daffy sympathetically gives him a gift, promising to stop being screwy, and walks away. However, Daffy then pops up out of the gift box, bites Hamburger's nose and starts jumping around.

As filming begins, a typical romantic scene between a rooster and hen plays out. When the inevitable kiss comes up, Daffy jumps in and kisses the hen; he is so excited that he does it again. Hamburger declares "It's ruined, cut!" The time being noon, Hamburger asks for lunch: turkey with all the trimmings. However, Daffy is under the platter and bites Hamburger's nose again, then jumps away. Then, in the film room, Daffy begins clipping and pasting together random film clips into a collage film.

Hamburger tells Stupendous that his film is finished, Stupendous quotes "Well it better be good" as Daffy swaps out the films. Hamburger shows the "film". At first the title card reads "Gold Is Where You Find It" (a movie produced by Warner Bros. the same year), showing film clips of gold mining, but then suddenly plays humorous live action clips of random scenes with appropriate mismatched audio (a lion roaring in Central Park Zoo, a US military parade, square dancing, the World Championship Fight in Madison Round Garden, and a beauty contest). Despite Hamburger's obvious (and justified) fear, Stupendous approves highly of the film as he finds that Hamburger has fainted.

As a result, Daffy is now the director, uttering the same line asking for turkey at lunchtime as Hamburger complete with Hamburger's accent and clothing. Hamburger retaliates by hiding under a platter, biting Daffy's nose, then jumping away as Daffy did earlier.

== Voice Cast ==
- Mel Blanc as Daffy Duck / I.M. Stupdendous / Von Hamburger's Yes Men / Sound Technician / Leading Man / Cook / Boxing Ring Annoucner
- Rolfe Sedan as Director Von Hamburger
- Sara Berner as Leading Lady / Fat Lady (both impersonating Katharine Hepburn)
- Jim Bannon as the Newsreel Narrator

== Home media ==
- VHS 1988 - Cartoon Moviestars: Daffy! - MGM/UA Home Video
- Laserdisc 1988 - Cartoon Moviestars: Daffy! and Porky! - MGM/UA Home Video
- Laserdisc 1991 - The Golden Age of Looney Tunes: Volume 1 - MGM/UA Home Video
- VHS 1992 - The Golden Age of Looney Tunes: Vol. 9 - Hooray For Hollywood - MGM/UA Home Video
- VHS 1999 - Looney Tunes: The Collector's Edition, Vol. 8 - Tex-Book Looney - Warner Home Video/Columbia House
- DVD 2005 - Looney Tunes Golden Collection: Volume 3 (restored) - Warner Home Video
- Blu-Ray 2019 - Jezebel (extra, restored) - Warner Archive Collection
- Blu-Ray 2023 - Cats Don't Dance (extra, restored) - Warner Archive Collection

== See also ==
- Daffy Duck filmography
- Looney Tunes and Merrie Melodies filmography (1930–1939)

Preceded by The Daffy Doc	Daffy Duck Cartoons; 1938	Succeeded by Daffy Duck and the Dinosaur
