= Duck Soup to Nuts =

- Blue Ribbon title card
- Directed by: I. Freleng
- Story by: Tedd Pierce
- Produced by: Leon Schlesinger
- Starring: Mel Blanc
- Music by: Carl W. Stalling
- Animation by: Richard Bickenbach
- Color process: Technicolor
- Distributed by: Warner Bros. Pictures
- Release dates: May 27, 1944 (original); January 6, 1951 (reissue)
- Running time: 6:59
- Language: English

Duck Soup to Nuts is a 1944 Warner Bros. Looney Tunes cartoon directed by Friz Freleng. The cartoon was released on May 27, 1944, and stars Daffy Duck and Porky Pig.

== Plot ==
Daffy Duck enjoys a tranquil moment among mallards in a pond until a gunshot startles them. The ducks scatter as Porky Pig enters, aiming at Daffy. However, Daffy outsmarts Porky, showcasing his talents and asserting his identity as more than a mere duck.

Despite Porky's attempts to apprehend him, Daffy continuously evades capture, resorting to humorous tactics like pretending to be a fish and labeling Porky as an eagle. Porky's efforts to shoot Daffy are futile, culminating in a comical farewell scene orchestrated by Daffy.

Porky ultimately refrains from harming Daffy, displaying a sense of moral integrity. Yet, the supposed family bidding farewell to Daffy turns out to be his friends in disguise, leading to a chaotic conclusion as Porky resumes his pursuit with a shotgun.

== Voice Cast ==
- Mel Blanc as Daffy Duck / Porky Pig / Ducks

== Home media ==
- VHS 1986 - Viddy-Oh! For Kids Cartoon Festivals: The Best of Bugs Bunny and Friends - MGM/UA Home Video
- VHS 1986 - Viddy-Oh! For Kids Cartoon Festivals: Porky Pig and Daffy Duck Cartoon Festival Featuring "Tick Tock Tuckered" - MGM/UA Home Video
- VHS 1988 - Cartoon Moviestars: Just Plain Daffy - MGM/UA Home Video
- Laserdisc 1991 - The Golden Age of Looney Tunes: Volume 1 - MGM/UA Home Video
- VHS 1992 - The Golden Age of Looney Tunes: Vol. 6 - Friz Freleng - MGM/UA Home Video
- DVD 2004 - Looney Tunes Golden Collection: Volume 2 (restored) - Warner Home Video
- DVD 2004 - Looney Tunes Spotlight Collection: Volume 2 (restored) - Warner Home Video
- Blu-Ray 2026 - Looney Tunes Collector's Vault: Volume 3 (restored) - Warner Archive Collection

== See also ==
- Daffy Duck filmography
- Porky Pig filmography
- Looney Tunes and Merrie Melodies filmography (1940–1949)
