= Daffy Duck and the Dinosaur =

1939 film by Charles Jones

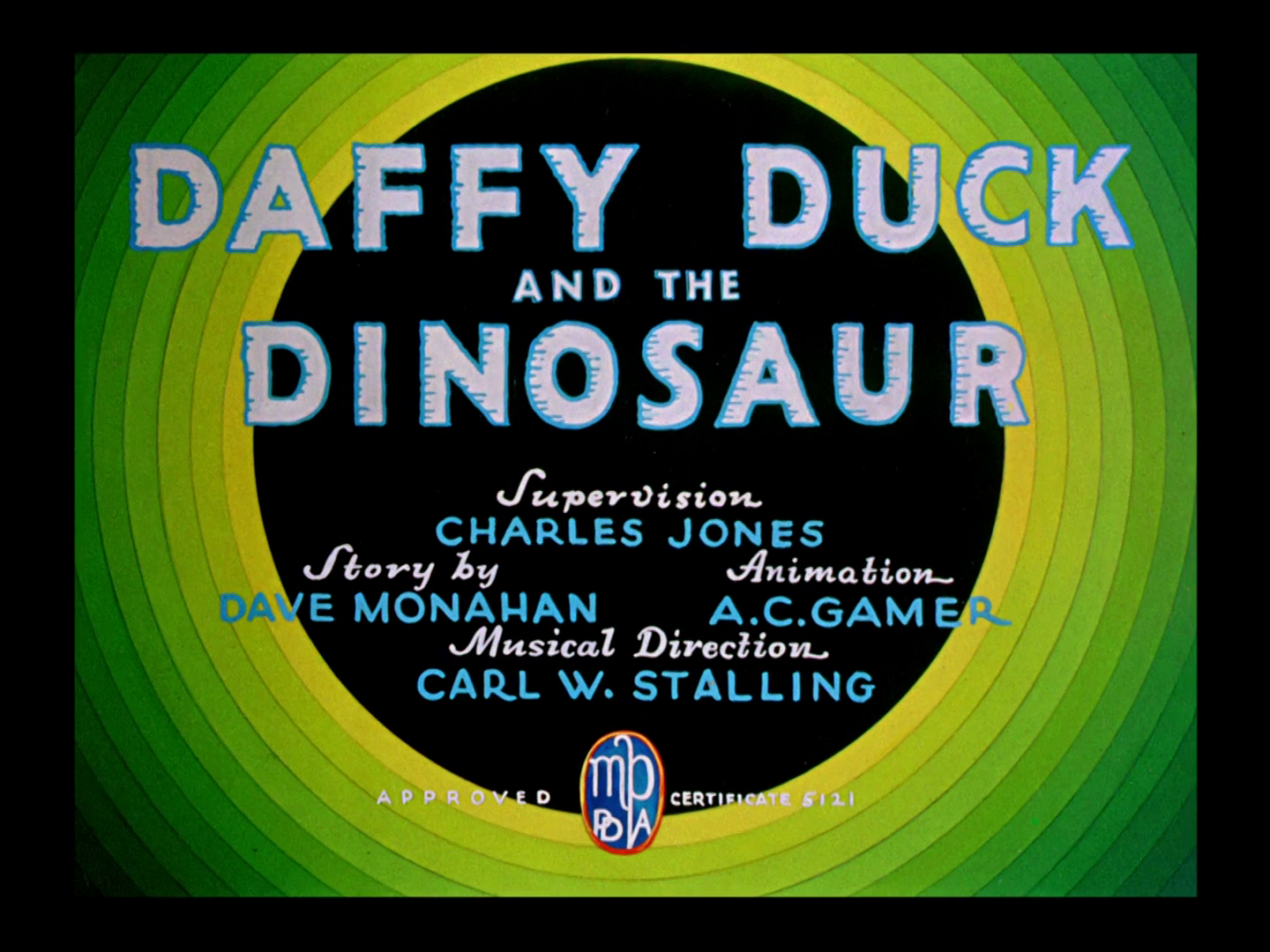
- Title card
- Directed by: Charles Jones
- Story by: Dave Monahan
- Produced by: Leon Schlesinger
- Starring: Mel Blanc; Jack Lescoulie
- Music by: Carl W. Stalling
- Animation by: A. C. Gamer
- Color process: Technicolor
- Production company: Leon Schlesinger Productions
- Distributed by: Warner Bros. Pictures; The Vitaphone Corporation
- Release date: April 22, 1939
- Running time: 8 min
- Country: United States
- Language: English

Daffy Duck and the Dinosaur is a 1939 American animated comedy short film directed by Chuck Jones. The cartoon was released on April 22, 1939. It is part of the Merrie Melodies series, the seventh cartoon to feature Daffy Duck and the final cartoon to be released under The Vitaphone Corporation, which was relegated to mere copyright holder after its release.

== Plot ==
At the Stone Age, Casper Caveman (a caricature of Jack Benny) and Fido (an apatosaur) go hunting for breakfast. Casper spots Daffy and uses a slingshot to fire a rock at Daffy, who runs to avoid the rock before allowing the rock to pass while he is disguised as a traffic police officer. The rock realizes his mistake and somehow goes the other direction, accidentally knocking out Fido in the process.

Casper is blindsided by Daffy's craziness, which Daffy affirms by hitting Casper with the slingshot's rubber. He tries to swim to catch Daffy, but is stopped mid-air by Daffy holding a "no swimming" sign. Fido is instructed to find him but fails. Daffy paints a convincing lookalike of himself on a boulder, which Casper predictably is unable to see through and hits, causing him to feel the recoil of the hit. Daffy helps him recover with a stiff drink and taunts him with a card and numerous billboards, which leads him to Daffy's apparent location through various marketing techniques. Daffy inflates a giant swan balloon, which Casper pops, killing them and Fido.

== Voice Cast ==
- Mel Blanc as Daffy Duck
- Jack Lescoulie as Casper Caveman

== Home media ==
- VHS 1986 - Viddy-Oh! For Kids Cartoon Festivals: Daffy Duck Cartoon Festival Featuring "Daffy Duck and the Dinosaur" - MGM/UA Home Video
- VHS 1990 - Cartoon Moviestars: Daffy Duck and Company - MGM/UA Home Video
- Laserdisc 1992 - The Golden Age of Looney Tunes: Volume 3 - MGM/UA Home Video
- DVD 2005 - Looney Tunes Golden Collection: Volume 3 (restored) - Warner Home Video
- DVD 2011 - Looney Tunes Spotlight Collection: Volume 7 (restored) - Warner Home Video

== In popular culture ==
In the music video for Was (Not Was)'s "Walk the Dinosaur", the cartoon in question is shown on its television.

In the episode "Memoriam" of Star Trek: Voyager, Tom Paris watches part of this cartoon.

== See also ==
- List of films featuring dinosaurs
- Malibu Beach Party - Another cartoon that evoked a caricature of Jack Benny and used his usual farewell.
- Daffy Duck filmography
- Looney Tunes and Merrie Melodies filmography (1930–1939)
- List of animated films in the public domain in the United States

Preceded by Daffy Duck in Hollywood	Daffy Duck Cartoons; 1939	Succeeded by A Coy Decoy
