= China Jones =

1959 film

- Directed by: Robert McKimson
- Story by: Tedd Pierce
- Starring: Mel Blanc
- Edited by: Treg Brown
- Music by: Milt Franklyn
- Animation by: Tom Ray; George Grandpré; Ted Bonnicksen; Warren Batchelder
- Layouts by: Robert Gribbroek
- Backgrounds by: William Butler
- Color process: Technicolor
- Production company: Warner Bros. Cartoons
- Distributed by: Warner Bros. Pictures; The Vitaphone Corporation
- Release date: February 14, 1959
- Language: English

China Jones is a 1959 Warner Bros. Looney Tunes short directed by Robert McKimson. The short was released on February 14, 1959, and stars Daffy Duck and Porky Pig. This cartoon later became rarely shown in the United States due to ethnic caricatures of Chinese and other East Asian people. The cartoon is a spoof of the 1950s TV series China Smith, starring Dan Duryea.

== Plot ==
Daffy Duck is China Jones, an Irish private investigator working in Hong Kong in the Far East. At a restaurant called Lo Down, he finds a fortune cookie containing a call for help which states: "HELP!! I'm being held prisoner in a Chinese bakery. - £150 REWARD" (around £4,374 in today's money) and decides to investigate. Needing a good hot tip as he is unsure where to look out of the thousands of bakeries in China, he sees a solo musician advertising for hot tips from a bar run by Limey Louie, a friend of Jones who is busy doing time in prison. As Jones leaves the restaurant, he is met by Charlie Chung (Porky Pig), a caricature of Charlie Chan, who Jones treats as a fellow detective. When Chung tries to bring up a matter of money, Jones simply thinks Chung is trying to cut in on the reward.

It turns out to be a trap set by Limey Louie, who has already gotten out of prison and wants vengeance on Jones, whom he blames for getting him sent up the river. Having anticipated Jones would fall for the "prisoner in a Chinese bakery" fortune, the ex-convict disguises himself as his grieving "wife", first roughing up Jones upon his arrival to "recount" the physical abuse the police gave Louie. When Jones enquires about hot tips, Louie gives him two false clues that each lead to "No. 10, Wong Way" and "Ho Down Wharf, second sampan". In the case of the former, Jones is torched by a fire-breathing "Dragon Lady". In the case of the latter, when Jones investigates the sampan in question, someone cuts the mooring rope securing it and the sampan instantly sinks into the wharf, taking Jones with it.

Upon Jones' return and irritated inquiry of more "hot tips", Louie drops the ruse and declares his intention of revenge on Jones. Jones promptly escapes into the back room and tries to make his exit via the back door, only to notice a space marked "trap door" at the foot of it. His attempt to open the door from a distance with a bamboo stick ends up triggering the actual trap door right beneath him and he almost falls into an alligator pit. Louie however comes in and makes Jones fall in by playing "This Little Piggy" with his fingers. Narrowly escaping from the alligators via a back hatch and seeing Chung pass by again, Jones begs him to arrest Louie. However, Chung clarifies that he is not a detective, but a laundryman, and that the money he was referring to earlier was to pay for a large laundry bill. When Jones sarcastically tells Chung "Confucius say, 'can"t squeeze blood from turnip!'", the latter threatens him with a club, telling him "Also say, 'B-better you press shirt than press luck!'" The last scene shows Jones being forced to work for Chung to pay off his debt, as he speaks rapidly in subtitled "Chinese": "Help! - I'm being held prisoner in a Chinese Laundry!" (in reference to the earlier fortune).

== Censorship ==
During the 1990s, cable television network Nickelodeon omitted the final scene wherein Daffy Duck finds himself trapped in a laundromat and delivers a faux Chinese rant. This decision was prompted by concerns regarding the portrayal of offensive ethnic stereotypes. Consequently, the cartoon was not broadcast in the United States or United Kingdom, although it did receive a limited release on Looney Tunes Classic Collection (1995) VHS in the latter country.

China Jones remained unavailable on modern home media until WarnerMedia Ride released a restored streaming print in 2021. The restoration was later released on the Looney Tunes Collector's Choice Volume 3 Blu-Ray disc in 2024.
