= A Coy Decoy =

1941 film by Robert Clampett

- Title card
- Directed by: Robert Clampett
- Story by: Melvin Millar
- Produced by: Leon Schlesinger
- Starring: Mel Blanc
- Music by: Carl W. Stalling
- Animation by: Norman McCabe
- Color process: Black-and-white
- Production company: Leon Schlesinger Productions
- Distributed by: Warner Bros. Pictures
- Release date: June 7, 1941
- Running time: 8 min
- Country: United States
- Language: English

A Coy Decoy is a 1941 American animated comedy short film directed by Robert Clampett. The cartoon was released on June 7, 1941. It is part of the Looney Tunes series, the 87th cartoon to feature Porky Pig and the twelfth film to feature Daffy Duck.

== Plot ==
In a bookstore, Porky Pig, featured on the cover of The Westerner, comes to life and sings "Ride, Tenderfoot, Ride". Across the way, Daffy Duck, featured on the cover of The Ugly Duckling, comes to life and sings "I Can't Get A Long Little Dogie". Daffy finds his way to Black Beauty and comes out riding not a horse, but a big black woman, whom he rides to The Lake.

A wolf emerges from The Wolf of Wall Street (presumably Blake McVeigh's novelization of the 1929 movie), sneaks behind Zane Grey's The Green Bay Tree and lures Daffy to him using a female duck decoy from the book Toys. Daffy is entranced and exclaims (quoting a recent hit record), "Well, Beat Me Daddy, Eight to the Bar." He follows and woos the decoy, adopting a Charles Boyer accent at one point, but when he closes his eyes, the wolf enters, and Daffy mistakenly embraces the wolf's nose. Once he realizes he is in danger, Daffy (recycling some of the dialogue from 1939's Hare-um Scare-um) tells the wolf that he is not worth eating (he claims to have so many diseases that even the draft rejected him) and runs away.

Daffy runs toward Ethel Vance's novel Escape, but the wolf blocks his way. As the wolf pursues, Daffy turns on him and exclaims the catchphrase from number one radio program Fibber McGee and Molly "You're a hard man, McGee." He then uses the books to defeat the wolf. He opens a copy of Nordhoff and Hall's The Hurricane to blow the wolf away, and lightning from the book Lightning strikes the wolf. The wolf surrenders, fittingly under Ernest Hemingway's recent bestseller For Whom the Bell Tolls.

Daffy returns to the decoy. Porky enters the scene addresses in derision of Daffy, saying that Daffy and the decoy could never "mean anything to each other." Daffy sticks up his nose and swims away with the decoy, followed by four tiny decoys that look like Daffy.

== Voice cast ==
- Mel Blanc as Porky Pig / Daffy Duck / Wolf Screaming / Duckling

== Home media ==
- DVD 2017 - Porky Pig 101 (remastered) - Warner Archive Collection

== See also ==
- Daffy Duck filmography
- Porky Pig filmography
- Looney Tunes and Merrie Melodies filmography (1940–1949)
- List of animated films in the public domain in the United States

Preceded by Daffy Duck and the Dinosaur	Daffy Duck Cartoons; 1941	Succeeded by The Henpecked Duck
