= Deduce, You Say! =

1956 film by Chuck Jones

- Lobby card
- Directed by: Chuck Jones
- Story by: Michael Maltese
- Starring: Mel Blanc; June Foray
- Edited by: Treg Brown
- Music by: Milt Franklyn
- Animation by: Abe Levitow; Richard Thompson; Ken Harris; Ben Washam
- Layouts by: Maurice Noble
- Backgrounds by: Philip DeGuard
- Color process: Technicolor
- Distributed by: Warner Bros. Pictures; The Vitaphone Corporation
- Release date: September 29, 1956
- Running time: 7:07
- Country: United States
- Language: English

Deduce, You Say! is a 1956 Warner Bros. Looney Tunes cartoon, directed by Chuck Jones and written by Michael Maltese. The short was released on September 29, 1956, and stars Daffy Duck and Porky Pig. The title is a play on the exclamation, "The deuce, you say!"

The cartoon features Daffy Duck as the dim-witted detective Dorlock Homes (a parody of Sherlock Holmes) and Porky Pig as his sidekick Watkins (Dr. Watson), as they attempt to locate and apprehend the dangerous "Shropshire Slasher."

== Plot ==
In London, Dorlock Homes resides on Beeker Street (a parody of Baker Street). Engaged in "deductive reasoning" related to tax deductions, Homes receives a telegram from the Shropshire Slasher, a notorious criminal. Determined to apprehend him, Homes and Dr. Watkins visit a pub where the Slasher frequents. Despite Holmes' bumbling attempts, it's Watkins' polite interrogation that convinces the Slasher to surrender. However, a misunderstanding arises when Homes accuses a flower seller of operating without a license, unaware that she is the Slasher's mother. In the end, the Slasher voluntarily turns himself in, leaving Homes to quip about his "elementary" detective skills learned in elementary school.

== Reception ==
Animation historian Jerry Beck writes, "Deduce, You Say is an outrageously witty film that parodies both the original Sherlock Holmes books by Conan Doyle and the Hollywood movie versions ... The premise allowed [Chuck] Jones to combine Daffy's frantic animated action with Porky's subtle attitudes, facial expressions, and posing, which get just as many laughs. A class act, and a first-rate cartoon."

== Voice Cast ==
- Mel Blanc as Daffy Duck (as Dorlock Homes), Porky Pig (as Dr. Watkins), The Shropshire Slasher, the Telegram Deliveryman, Alfie, and the Bartender
- June Foray as The Shropshire Slasher's Mother and Lady Ashtabula (uncredited)

== Home media ==
DVD:

- Looney Tunes Golden Collection: Volume 1
- The Essential Daffy Duck

Blu-ray/DVD:

- Looney Tunes Platinum Collection: Volume 2
