= Robin Hood Daffy =

1958 animated short film by Chuck Jones

- Lobby card
- Directed by: Chuck Jones
- Story by: Michael Maltese
- Starring: Mel Blanc
- Edited by: Treg Brown
- Music by: Milt Franklyn
- Animation by: Abe Levitow; Richard Thompson; Ken Harris
- Layouts by: Maurice Noble
- Backgrounds by: Philip DeGuard
- Color process: Technicolor
- Production company: Warner Bros. Cartoons
- Distributed by: Warner Bros. Pictures; The Vitaphone Corporation
- Release date: March 8, 1958 (U.S.)
- Running time: 6:37
- Language: English

Robin Hood Daffy is a 1958 Warner Bros. Merrie Melodies cartoon, directed by Chuck Jones and written by Michael Maltese. The short was released on March 8, 1958, and stars Daffy Duck as Robin Hood and Porky Pig as Friar Tuck.

It was the last of Jones' parody cartoons with the duo, and the last appearance of Porky in a theatrical cartoon directed by Jones during the Golden Age of Animation. It was also the second parody of Robin Hood directed by Chuck Jones, after the 1949 Bugs Bunny short Rabbit Hood. An edited version of Robin Hood Daffy was included in the theatrical film The Bugs Bunny/Road Runner Movie (1979).

== Plot ==
Daffy Duck assumes the guise of Robin Hood, commencing with a whimsical display of musical prowess on a long-necked lute akin to a tambouras. However, his jovial demeanor is swiftly disrupted as he careens down a hillside and into a river, drawing the bemused attention of Porky Pig, cast as Friar Tuck.

Undeterred by his mishap, Daffy endeavors to showcase his prowess with a "buck-and-a-quarter quarterstaff", only to inadvertently inflict injury upon himself, perpetuating a recurring visual motif of his bill getting bent. Despite his earnest attempts, Daffy's efforts are met with ridicule from Porky, who remains skeptical of his claims to be Robin Hood.

In a bid to validate his identity, Daffy undertakes a series of inept endeavors to rob a wealthy traveler, each endeavor resulting in further humiliation and physical harm. From misfired arrows to calamitous attempts at swinging on ropes, Daffy's exploits only serve to reinforce Porky's doubts regarding his purported identity as Robin Hood.

Ultimately conceding defeat, Daffy relinquishes his ambitions of thievery and adopts the persona of "Friar Duck," symbolized by a tonsured head and religious habit.

== Reception ==
Linda Simensky writes, "Robin Hood Daffy is a visual delight abounding with physical gags, bold colors — bright green against a yellow sky — and layouts and backgrounds that complement a leotard-wearing duck swinging through the trees on a rope. Daffy gets some classic moments, including a lute song and some arrow gags, but by the end he is fairly unsuccessful as a Robin Hood and gives it all up. As Daffy himself notes, 'Ha ha. It is to laugh.'"

== Home media ==
Robin Hood Daffy, along with Rabbit Hood, is available as an extra on the DVD (and later the Blu-ray) edition of The Adventures of Robin Hood. The short is also available on the Looney Tunes Golden Collection: Volume 3 and Essential Daffy Duck DVD sets, as well as the Looney Tunes Platinum Collection: Volume 1 Blu-ray set.

== See also ==
- List of films and television series featuring Robin Hood
- List of American films of 1958
