= Felix in Hollywood =

1923 film

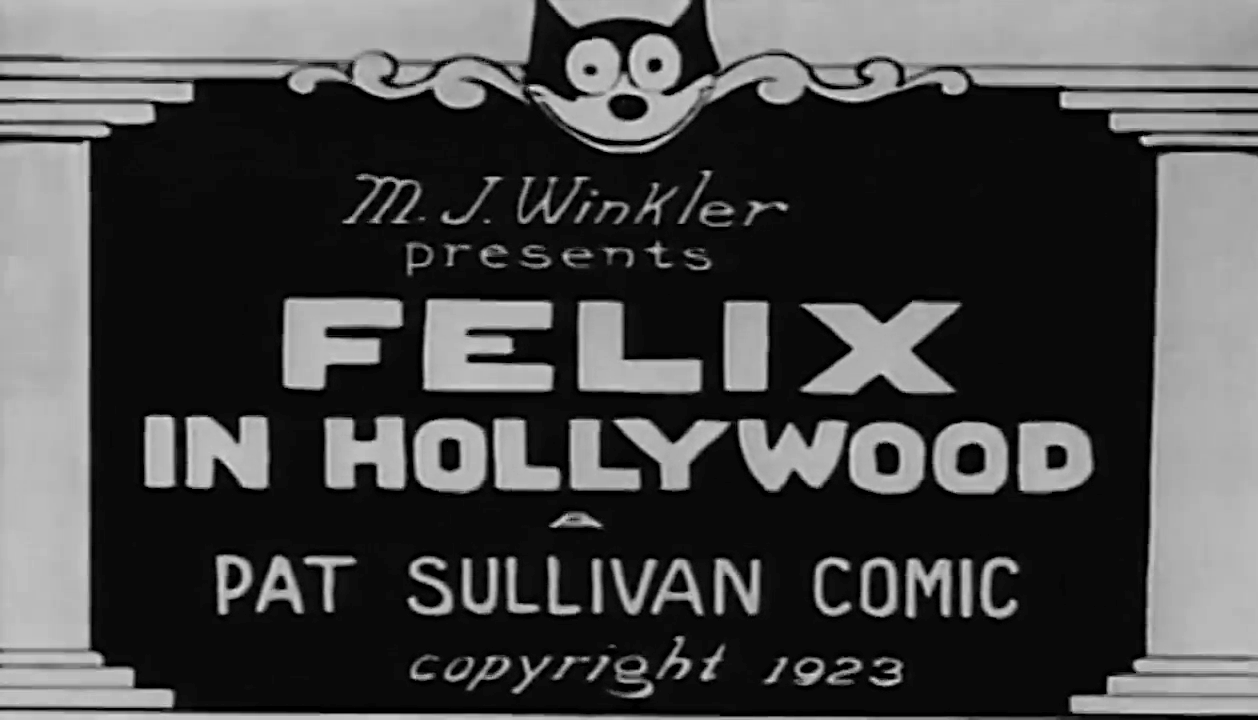
- Directed by: Otto Messmer
- Produced by: Pat Sullivan
- Animation by: Bill Nolan; Otto Messmer
- Color process: Black and white
- Production company: Pat Sullivan Studios
- Distributed by: Margaret J. Winkler
- Release date: July 15, 1923
- Running time: 9:17
- Country: United States
- Language: English

Felix in Hollywood is an 1923 American silent animated short film featuring Felix the Cat, released on July 15, 1923. The short was named number 50 of The 50 Greatest Cartoons of all time in a 1994 survey of animators and cartoon historians.

== Plot ==
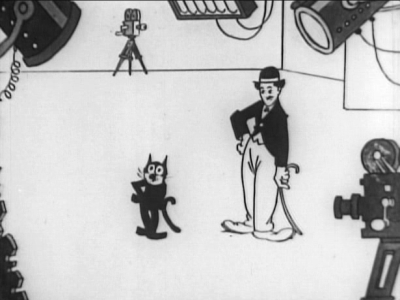
Felix and Charlie Chaplin share the screen in a memorable moment from the short.

Felix and his owner want to go to Hollywood, but they are penniless, so his owner sends him out to get a job. He stumbles upon a shoe store needing help, where he plans on bringing in customers by forcing them to step in bubble gum. His scheme is successful and he earns $500, which he hands over to his owner.

When they arrive in Hollywood, Felix dumps his owner to pursue his own career in acting at Static Studio, where he is more than happy to display his acting skills, showing both joy and sorrow for the studio boss. Soon after, he hears someone yelling for help, and to his surprise, finds Douglas Fairbanks being attacked by giant mosquitoes. Also standing nearby is William S. Hart, whom he grabs a gun from and shoots the mosquitoes. This act of bravery amuses Cecil B. DeMille, who then signs him to a contract.

Felix also runs into Charlie Chaplin, Will Hays, Snub Pollard, Ben Turpin and Gloria Swanson by peeping through the keyhole of her dressing room. This short film is the first animated cartoon to feature caricatures of Hollywood celebrities. In the film, when Felix performs an accurate impression of Charlie Chaplin's walk, where he turns his tail into a walking cane to mimic Chaplin, Felix is accused by Chaplin of "stealing my stuff". This short sequence was an inside joke inserted into the cartoon by Otto Messmer. Chaplin reportedly told Pat Sullivan: "I have only one rival - Felix".

== Reception and legacy ==
The short was named number 50 of The 50 Greatest Cartoons of all time in a 1994 survey of animators and cartoon historians by Jerry Beck, making it the only Felix the Cat cartoon on the list.

Felix in Hollywood was partly responsible for the creative idea of placing Hollywood celebrity cameos into cartoons, which can be seen in later films from other animation studios including Disney and Warner Bros.

Felix in Hollywood, along with other classic cartoons, were featured on Cartoon Network on March 14, 1998, as part of "The 50 Greatest Cartoons of All Time" marathon.

== Gallery ==
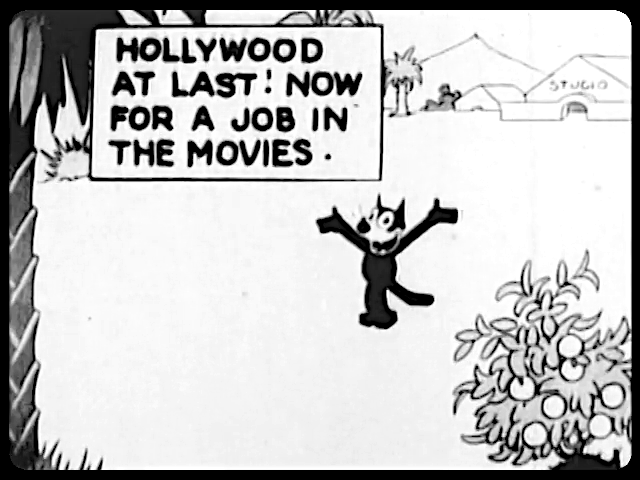
Felix arriving in Hollywood

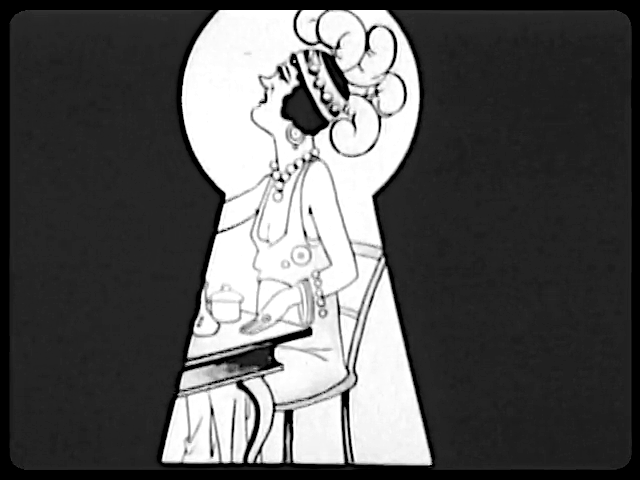
Felix peeping through the keyhole at Gloria Swanson

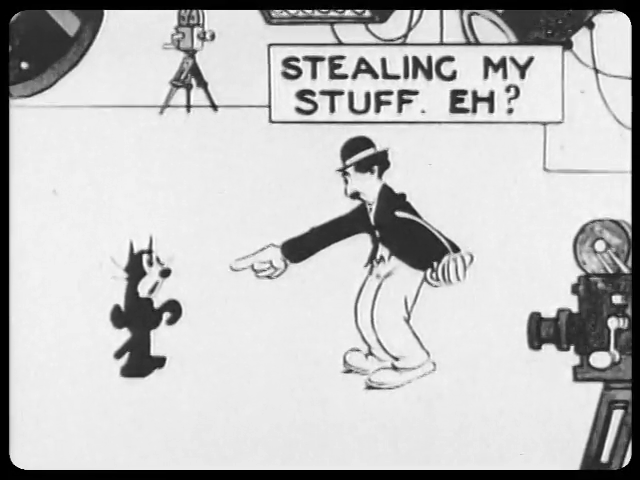
Charlie Chapin chastising Felix

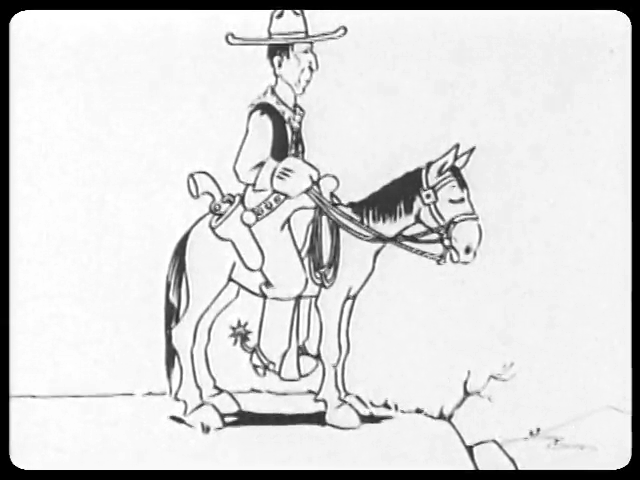
William Hart's cameo appearance

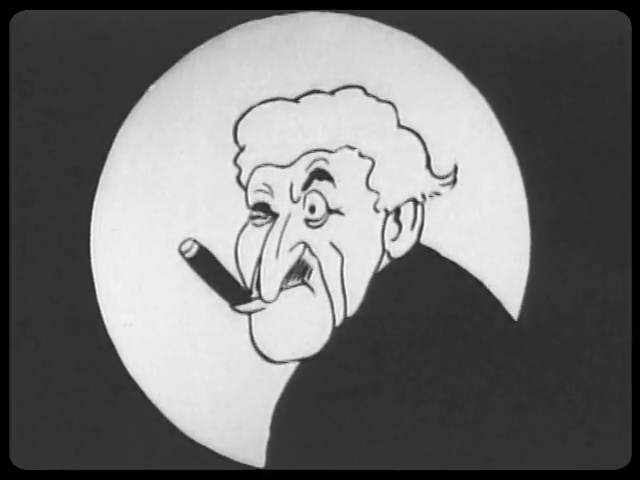
Snub Pollard's cameo appearance

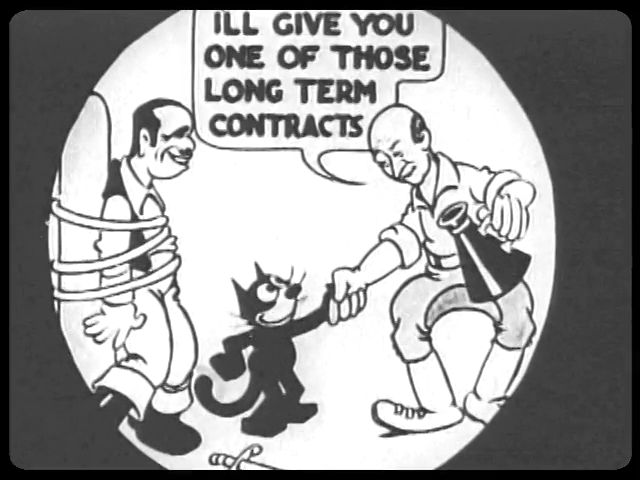
Felix with Cecil DeMille and Douglas Fairbanks

== See also ==
- Mickey's Gala Premier
- Mickey's Polo Team
- Mother Goose Goes Hollywood
- Hollywood Steps Out
- Hollywood Daffy
- The Autograph Hound
- Slick Hare
- What's Cookin' Doc?
