= What's Cookin' Doc? =

1944 animated short film directed by Bob Clampett

- Lobby card
- Directed by: Robert Clampett
- Story by: Michael Sasanoff
- Produced by: Leon Schlesinger
- Music by: Carl W. Stalling
- Animation by: Bob McKimson
- Color process: Technicolor
- Production company: Leon Schlesinger Productions
- Distributed by: Warner Bros. Pictures, Inc.
- Release date: January 8, 1944
- Running time: 8:08
- Country: United States
- Language: English

What's Cookin' Doc? is a 1943-produced, 1944 Warner Bros. cartoon in the Merrie Melodies series, directed by Bob Clampett, and stars Bugs Bunny. The short was also written by Michael Sasanoff, and was animated by Robert McKimson, along with uncredited work by Rod Scribner, Phil Monroe and Virgil Ross. The film was released on January 8, 1944.

The title is a variant on Bugs' catch-phrase "What's up Doc?". It also hints at one of the scenes in the picture.

== Plot ==
The plot centers on the Academy Awards presentation. The action begins with live action color film footage of various Hollywood scenes (edited from A Star Is Born), narrated by Robert C. Bruce. It leads up to the Big Question of the evening: Who will win "the" Oscar? The film shows the stereotypical red carpet arrivals of stars, as well as a human emcee starting to introduce the Oscar show.

At this point, the film switches to animation, with the shadow of a now-animated emcee (and now voiced by Mel Blanc) continuing to introduce the Oscar, and Bugs (also Mel Blanc's voice, as usual) assuring the viewer that "it's in da bag; I'm a cinch to win." Bugs is stunned when the award goes instead to James Cagney (who had actually won in the previous year's ceremony, for Warner's Yankee Doodle Dandy). Shock turns to anger as Bugs declares the results to be "sa-bo-TAH-gee" and demands a recount.

Bugs then tries to make his case by showing Hiawatha's Rabbit Hunt (here titled Little Hiawatha) as proof of his allegedly superior acting (an inside joke, as the cartoon had actually been nominated for an Oscar and lost). He hurls a set of film cans off-screen, telling the audience that they are "some of [his] best scenes", and orders "Okay, Smokey, roll 'em!" Immediately, a "stag reel" (with the title card depicting a grinning stag) starts to roll, and the startled Bugs quickly stops it and embarrassingly switches to the right film. After Bugs shows the cartoon, there is then a parody of aggressive salesmanship: Bugs beats a bass drum and parades across the stage with signs such as "Let Bugs Have It" and "Give It To Bugs". He then quickly passes out cigars en masse to the audience.

Finally, Bugs pleads with the audience, "Well, what do you say, folks? Do I get it? Or do I get it?" (echoing Fredric March's drunken appeal to the Academy Award banquet audience in A Star Is Born). The emcee asks the audience (in an affected nasal voice), "Shall we give it to him, folks?" and they yell, "Yeah, let's give it to him!" whereupon they pelt Bugs with fruits and vegetables (enabling him to briefly do a Carmen Miranda impression)... and an ersatz Oscar labeled "booby prize", which is actually a gold-plated rabbit statue. Bugs is so pleased at winning it, he remarks, "I'll even take youse to bed wit' me every night!" The statue suddenly comes alive, asks in a voice like that of radio character, Bert Gordon, "Do you mean it?", smooches the startled bunny, and takes on an effeminate, hip-swiveling pose, and the Bay-Woop! sound effect ends the cartoon.

== Analysis ==
The subtext of the short is the self-consciousness of Warner Bros. Cartoons about their then-lack of success at the Academy Awards. The studio had yet to win an Academy Award for Best Animated Short Film. The clips from Hiawatha's Rabbit Hunt (1941) allude to this subtext. It was a former nominee for the award and had lost to Lend a Paw (1941).

The live-action film footage was derived from the film A Star Is Born (1937). Footage depict the footprints of the stars at the Chinese Theatre, and nightlife at the Trocadero and the Cocoanut Grove.

The premise of the film is that Bugs Bunny is competing for the Academy Award for Best Actor. He demonstrates his acting ability by transforming into Jerry Colonna, Bing Crosby, Cecil B. DeMille, Katharine Hepburn, and Edward G. Robinson. As the announcer lists the winner's traits, Bugs transforms to illustrate that they all apply to him: dramatic acting, refined comedy, skill at character roles, and prowess as a screen lover. He demonstrates his character acting by becoming Frankenstein's monster and his romantic acting by changing into Charles Boyer and romancing a carrot.

Bugs campaigns for the award by addressing the people in the movie audience. His methods of campaigning include dispensing cigars, drum beating, and glad-handing. He thus earns a booby prize, a second-class award reminiscent of the miniature Oscars awarded to Snow White and the Seven Dwarfs (1937). The implication is that awards are not won by the most talented and deserving, but those capable of lobbying.

The short includes a subtle reference to World War II, and the broader usage of cartoons as war propaganda. There is a newspaper headline announcing the Academy Awards. A sub-headline on the same page reads "Jap Cruiser Blown Up", a reference to the contemporary Imperial Japanese Navy. Another sub-headline notes, "Adolph Hitler commits suicide". This was wishful thinking, as he did not actually do so until April 1945.

== Home media ==
- The short occurs in its entirety in the documentary Bugs Bunny: Superstar Part 1, which is available as a special feature on Disc 1 of the Looney Tunes Golden Collection: Volume 4, although it was not remastered or released independently in that series.
- It also appears as a bonus short on two DVD releases; Warner Bros. Home Entertainment Academy Awards Animation Collection (Disc 3), and on Captains of the Clouds, both in its 1995 dubbed print version.
- It was released on the Bugs Bunny 80th Anniversary Collection fully restored by Jerry Beck and George Feltenstein, making it the first time the cartoon has been fully restored.

== Sources ==
- Crafton, Donald (1998), "The View from Termite Terrace: Caricature and Parody in Warner Bros. Animation", in Sandler, Kevin S. (ed.), Reading the Rabbit: Explorations in Warner Bros. Animation, Rutgers University Press, ISBN 978-0813525389
- Shull, Michael S.; Wilt, David E. (2004), "Filmography 1944", Doing Their Bit: Wartime American Animated Short Films, 1939-1945, McFarland & Company, ISBN 978-0786481699

== See also ==
- Looney Tunes and Merrie Melodies filmography (1940–1949)
- Bugs Bunny filmography
- Mickey's Gala Premiere
- Mickey's Polo Team
- Mother Goose Goes To Hollywood
- The Autograph Hound
- Hollywood Steps Out
- Hollywood Daffy
- Slick Hare

Preceded by Little Red Riding Rabbit	Bugs Bunny Cartoons; 1944	Succeeded by Bugs Bunny and the Three Bears
