= Slick Hare =

1947 film by Friz Freleng

- Directed by: I. Freleng
- Story by: Tedd Pierce; Michael Maltese
- Starring: Mel Blanc; Arthur Q. Bryan (uncredited); Dave Barry (uncredited)
- Music by: Carl Stalling
- Animation by: Virgil Ross; Gerry Chiniquy; Manuel Perez; Ken Champin
- Layouts by: Hawley Pratt
- Backgrounds by: Paul Julian
- Color process: Technicolor
- Production company: Warner Bros. Cartoons
- Distributed by: Warner Bros. Pictures; The Vitaphone Corporation
- Release date: November 1, 1947 (USA)
- Running time: 7:43
- Language: English

Slick Hare is a 1947 Merrie Melodies cartoon, directed by Friz Freleng. The film was released on November 1, 1947, and features Bugs Bunny and Elmer Fudd. It parodies the Mocambo nightclub in Los Angeles—in the cartoon referred to as "The Mocrumbo". Mel Blanc voices Bugs, Arthur Q. Bryan voices Elmer and impressionist Dave Barry portrays Humphrey Bogart. The title is a pun on "hair", from an era when hair slicked down by oil was a popular fashion style for men.

== Plot ==
The cartoon commences with a satirical portrayal of 1940s Hollywood luminaries (among them were figures; Ray Milland, Gregory Peck and Frank Sinatra) indulging in culinary extravagance at the Mocrumbo club, replete with exaggerated antics and whimsical nods to Hollywood celebrities.

Amidst the glamorous milieu, Elmer Fudd, cast as a hapless waiter, encounters the formidable Humphrey Bogart (impersonated by Dave Barry), whose demand for fried rabbit sets off a chain of absurd events. Elmer's frantic quest for a rabbit leads him to an unwitting Bugs Bunny ensconced amidst crates of carrots, igniting a miscommunication that sees Bugs fleeing from the impending dinner invitation.

Bugs' escapades unfold in a series of comedic encounters, from disguising himself as Groucho Marx to a frantic pursuit through the eccentricities of a showbiz setting, including personal encounters with Carmen Miranda and Sydney Greenstreet. At one point, Bugs himself gets up on the stage and performs a song and dance.

As the tension mounts, Bugs' typical quick-witted antics and Elmer's hapless endeavors culminate in a chaotic climax, with mistaken identities and pie-slinging antics punctuating the farcical proceedings. Ultimately, Bugs' comedic prowess prevails, as he willingly assumes the role of Lauren Bacall's main course.

== Cast ==
- Mel Blanc as Bugs Bunny, Waiter, Bartender and Ray Milland
- Arthur Q. Bryan as Elmer Fudd (uncredited)
- Dave Barry as Humphrey Bogart (uncredited)
- Carmen Miranda as herself (uncredited)

== Production ==
Background artist Paul Julian visited the kitchen at the Mocambo, and based this cartoon's kitchen backgrounds on the unhygienic things he observed there, later commenting in an interview: "I was so bloody revolted by it that I came back and made a documentary out of it!"

== Reception ==
Cartoon voice actor Keith Scott writes, "One of the last of Warner Bros.' topical caricature cartoons, Slick Hare is much more accessible to a modern audience than some other entries in the movie-star parody genre. This is because Bugs Bunny and Elmer Fudd carry the comedy. With these two strong personalities in the foreground, the throwaway movie-star gags are more like the icing on a cake."

== Home media ==
- This cartoon can be found on the Looney Tunes Golden Collection: Volume 2 and the Looney Tunes Platinum Collection: Volume 3.
- The short is also an extra on the DVD release of the 1947 Humphrey Bogart film Dark Passage, available individually and as part of the Bogie & Bacall: The Signature Collection DVD boxed set.

== See also ==
- Bugs Bunny filmography
- Elmer Fudd filmography
- Looney Tunes and Merrie Melodies filmography (1940–1949)
- Mickey's Gala Premiere
- Mickey's Polo Team
- Mother Goose Goes Hollywood
- The Autograph Hound
- Hollywood Steps Out
- Hollywood Daffy
- What's Cookin' Doc?
- Felix in Hollywood

| Preceded by Easter Yeggs | Bugs Bunny Cartoons; 1947 | Succeeded by Gorilla My Dreams |
