= Hollywood Steps Out =

1941 film by Fred Avery

- Blue Ribbon title card
- Directed by: Fred Avery
- Story by: Dave Monahan
- Produced by: Leon Schlesinger
- Starring: Sara Berner; Mel Blanc; Kent Rogers
- Music by: Carl W. Stalling
- Animation by: Rod Scribner
- Color process: Technicolor
- Production company: Leon Schlesinger Productions
- Distributed by: Warner Bros. Pictures
- Release date: May 24, 1941
- Running time: 7 min
- Country: United States
- Language: English

Hollywood Steps Out is a 1941 American animated comedy short film directed by Fred Avery. The short was released on May 24, 1941. It is part of the Merrie Melodies. It was re-released as a heavily edited "Blue Ribbon" reissue in 1948, rendering the original film, credits and numerous deleted scenes lost to this day.

The cartoon features caricatures of over forty contemporary Hollywood celebrities (along with guest appearances).

== Plot ==
A group of "caricatured" Hollywood stars is having an expensive dinner at Ciro's nightclub in West Hollywood. The first stars seen are Claudette Colbert, Don Ameche, Adolphe Menjou and Norma Shearer. Greta Garbo, working as a cigarette girl, sells a pack to Cary Grant, then lights his cigarette by striking a match on her very large foot.

Edward G. Robinson asks Ann Sheridan "How's the Oomph girl tonight?" Sheridan responds by uttering the word "oomph" several times.

Studio executives Henry Binder and Leon Schlesinger are shown. A seat is reserved for Bette Davis, as is an extra-wide sofa for Kate Smith. More seats are reserved for the characters of the Blondie films, including a fire hydrant for Daisy the dog.

In the cloakroom, Johnny Weissmuller checks a coat with Paulette Goddard that reveals his Tarzan outfit. Sally Rand leaves her trademark feather fans behind and is presumably naked.

James Cagney prepares Humphrey Bogart and George Raft for a risky task: pitching pennies.

Harpo Marx gives Garbo a hot foot, who slowly reacts with a weary "Ouch". Clark Gable turns his head around 180 degrees to observe a blonde girl, whom he follows offscreen. He makes up an excuse to Carole Lombard, a scene deleted in the reissued version.

Bing Crosby introduces the evening's entertainment, interrupted frequently by a racehorse with an apparently unconscious jockey. Crosby presents conductor Leopold Stokowski, who wears a snood before performing "Ahí, viene la conga" (also known as "Here comes the conga" in English).

The conga inspires Dorothy Lamour to invite James Stewart to dance with her, who stutters, stammers, and runs away scared. Gable dances by, following the girl he saw earlier. Tyrone Power dances with Sonja Henie. Frankenstein's monster dances stiffly and woodenly. The Three Stooges abuse each other in rhythm to the beat. Gary Cooper dances with Shirley Temple, a scene deleted in the reissued version. Oliver Hardy's dance partner is revealed to be twin blonde women initially hidden by his obese frame. Cesar Romero dances clumsily with Rita Hayworth. Mickey Rooney, sitting with Judy Garland, is presented with an expensive bill, who turns to ask his Andy Hardy movie father (Lewis Stone) for a heart-to-heart talk. In the next scene, they are seen washing dishes. Gable is still pursuing the girl.

Crosby then introduces Sally Rand (identified as "Sally Strand"), performing a bubble dance to "I'm Forever Blowing Bubbles", as the camera cuts between the men's reactions and her dancing. Spectators at various tables include:

- Kay Kyser, William Powell, Spencer Tracy, Ronald Colman, Errol Flynn, Wallace Beery, and C. Aubrey Smith, who wolf-whistle in unison (by saying "Baby!").
- Peter Lorre, who remarks, "I haven't seen such a beautiful bubble since I was a child…"
- Henry Fonda, whose "mother" pulls him away by his ear (in its reference to The Aldrich Family).
- J. Edgar Hoover, wearing a 'G-man' badge and exclaiming "Gee!".
- Boris Karloff, Arthur Treacher, Buster Keaton, and Mischa Auer, asked by Ned Sparks if they are having a good time.
- Jerry Colonna, who reveals an invisible character next to him called "Yehudi".

Now that Strand is standing still on the stage, this allows Harpo Marx an opportunity to shoot her bubble with a slingshot. The bubble explodes on impact, and she reacts with shock, as it reveals she is wearing a barrel, held up by suspenders.

Meanwhile, Gable has finally caught up to the girl he was chasing and insists she kiss him. The girl turns out to be Groucho Marx in drag. In the deleted original ending, Gable does not mind and says, "I'm a bad boy!" (in reference to Lou Costello)

== Cast ==
- Kent Rogers as James Cagney, Cary Grant, Clark Gable, Peter Lorre, Groucho Marx, Mickey Rooney, James Stewart, J. Edgar Hoover, Henry Fonda, Bing Crosby and Kay Kyser
- Mel Blanc as Edward G. Robinson, Ned Sparks, Jerry Colonna and Lewis Stone
- Sara Berner as Greta Garbo, Ann Sheridan, Paulette Goddard, Dorothy Lamour and Henry Fonda's mother

== Reception ==
The Film Daily called the short a "caricature novelty", saying: "Latest Leon Schlesinger foray into the realm of caricature will interest and amuse."

Cartoon voice actor Keith Scott wrote: "There have been many twenty-first-century comments about how much this cartoon's cultural references (like conga music) and its raft of celebrities are impenetrable to a contemporary audience. However, on its initial release, Hollywood Steps Out was hyped as a special event and given a publicity buildup in The Los Angeles Times. Audiences in 1941 would have greeted every caricature with instant recognition and hearty laughter."

== Home media ==
Hollywood Steps Out is available on Looney Tunes Golden Collection: Volume 2 and on Looney Tunes Platinum Collection: Volume 2. Both feature the Blue Ribbon reissue title card.

== See also ==
- Looney Tunes and Merrie Melodies filmography (1940–1949)
- Mickey's Gala Premiere
- Mickey's Polo Team
- The Coo-Coo Nut Grove
- The Woods Are Full of Cuckoos
- Mother Goose Goes Hollywood
- The Autograph Hound
- What's Cookin' Doc?
- Hollywood Daffy
- Hollywood Canine Canteen
- Slick Hare
- What's Up, Doc? (1950 film)
