= Dave Barry (actor) =

American actor (1918–2001)

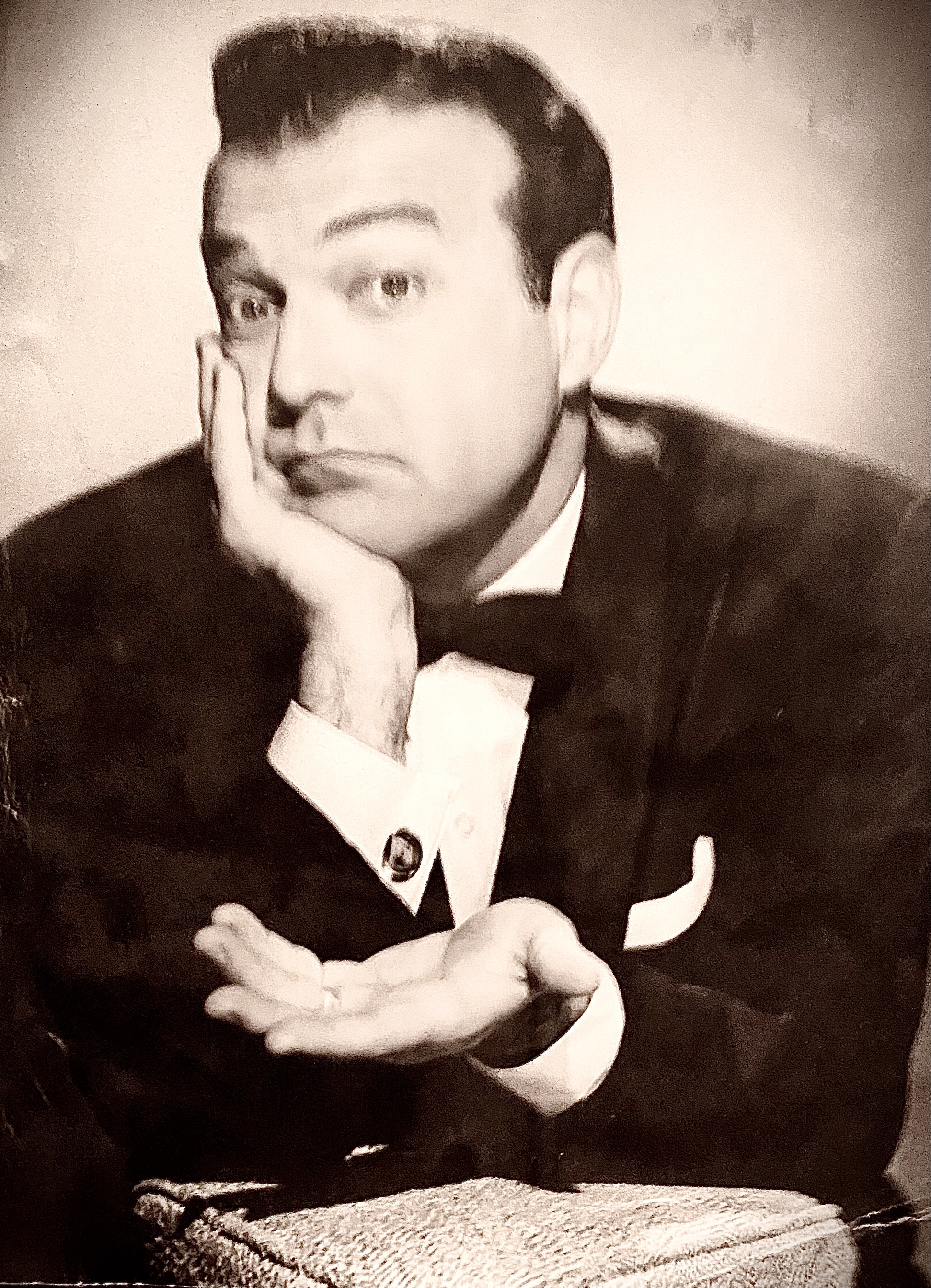
- Born: David Louis Siegel; August 26, 1918; New York City, New York, U.S.
- Died: August 16, 2001 (aged 82); Beverly Hills, California, U.S.
- Resting place: Mount Sinai Memorial Park Cemetery, Los Angeles, California, U.S.
- Occupations: Actor; comedian; radio moderator
- Years active: 1937–1979
- Spouse: Esther "Ginny Wayne" Seiden (m. 1941)
- Children: 5

Dave Barry (born David Louis Siegel; August 26, 1918 – August 16, 2001) was an American actor and comedian.

He is best known for his role as the band manager Mister Beinstock in the Billy Wilder comedy Some Like It Hot. His other film appearances include Playgirl, High Society, Voice in the Mirror, Spinout and Ladies of the Chorus.

Barry voiced characters in over fifty cartoons, mostly uncredited. He was one of several actors to voice the villainous Bluto in the Popeye film series.

== Biography ==
=== Early life ===
Dave Barry (family name David Siegel, last name legally changed in the 1940s) began his performing career in the 1930s at the age of sixteen with parts in radio and doing voice work for cartoons. The son of a furniture store owner, he made his debut on the radio talent show Major Bowes Amateur Hour as did Sara Berner, another talented female voice-over artist with whom he later worked. He built up a reputation as a stand-up comedian, entertaining troops during his military service in World War II on shows like Command Performance with Mary Pickford in 1942 just a few months after the United States entered the war.

Barry started as a Borscht Belt comic in the Catskill Mountains while serving in the United States Army during World War II and traveling with the United Service Organizations (USO) along with Bob Hope, Jimmy Durante, Eddie Cantor, Red Skelton and many celebrities of the time. Starting in the mid-1940s, Barry became something of a fixture in Las Vegas just as the city was starting to become famous, playing engagements at the Flamingo, Desert Inn and the El Rancho Hotel, performing with celebrities of the day such as Betty Grable, Anna Maria Alberghetti, Rose Marie, Sammy Davis Jr., Debbie Reynolds and later Wayne Newton.

In 1966, Barry headlined the Desert Inn variety musical show "Hello America", and later "Hooray for Hollywood", which were produced by Vegas extravaganza king Donn Arden. Later, for nearly a decade in the 1970s, Barry provided the opening act for Midnight Idol Wayne Newton, warming audiences at a variety of Howard Hughes-owned Hotels (The Desert Inn, the Sands and the Frontier).

=== Voice acting career ===
Because Barry excelled at mimicry and mastered an endless stream of accents/dialects and offbeat sounds, when he moved to Hollywood in the early 1940s, he sought out more cartoon voice work with Columbia, Warner Bros., Disney, Republic Pictures, and Screen Gems. He became sought after as an animation voice actor in the mid 1930s at the age of just 18, hired by the legendary Warner Bros. (Merrie Melodies) mogul Leon Schlesinger with the Hollywood-themed The Coo-Coo Nut Grove (1936), where he voiced actor Ned Sparks, Porky's Road Race (1937) and then a year later with Disney with the celebrity-filled Mother Goose Goes Hollywood (1938). Barry partnered with many of the most creative minds of early animation, and animated voice work (especially celebrities) became a lucrative side gig supplementing his comedy résumé and income. During a 1942 Miami stand-up performance, he was doing his stand-up act at a hotel when a man from the audience (who worked for the Miami-based Famous Studios) approached him at the bar after the show. He said they needed a deeply baritone voice for Popeye's nemesis Bluto in a series of Popeye features. Barry got the Miami job starting with the patriotic Seein' Red, White 'N' Blue (1943). Barry provided the deeply baritone swaggering voice for Bluto between 1942 and 1944 in six Popeye cartoons.

Barry's work in cartoons grew as animation gained popularity, voicing countless credited (and mostly uncredited) features. His most sought-after skill was uncannily impersonating celebrities of the period, including Groucho Marx, Humphrey Bogart, Cary Grant, James Cagney and Clark Gable, which he did with gusto in countless Looney Tunes and Merrie Melodies cartoons. He also voiced Elmer Fuddstone in Pre-Hysterical Hare (1958), standing in for Arthur Q. Bryan when he was ill and not able to voice him. For Looney Tunes, Dave Barry became best known for numerous appearances of Humphrey Bogart and other classic celebrities in cartoons such as Bacall to Arms (1946), Slick Hare (1947), 8 Ball Bunny (1950) and the star-studded Hollywood Steps Out (1941). He also voiced many nameless background characters.

Barry also performed a series of distinctive radio announcer voices for the famous "Marilyn Monroe is Getting Married" radio episode on the Edgar Bergen show (October 26, 1952) with Marilyn Monroe and Bergen's ventriloquist dummy Charlie McCarthy.

He also provided numerous voices for Capitol Records children's albums in the 1950s like "Bozo Under the Sea" with Pinto Colvig, Bugs Bunny, Merrie Melodies, Pink Panther, Popeye the Sailor, Roland and Rattfink and Sniffles along with Elmer Fudd and Mr. Magoo.

Barry also worked with well known voice actor Daws Butler on a number of novelty records in the 1960s including Capitol Records' "Dog's Best Friend / H-H-Him".

His last voice-over role was on The Pink Panther Laugh-and-a-Half Hour-and-a-Half Show in 1976. Previously, he had voiced various spies in the Pink Panther short "Pinkfinger" in 1965.

=== Film and television career ===
At the end of the 1940s, Barry began also to garner roles in both film and television. He appeared with Marilyn Monroe in the B-movie Ladies of the Chorus (1948), and 11 years later, he was reunited with her in what was perhaps his most famous role: bumbling band manager Beinstock in Billy Wilder's comedy Some Like It Hot (1959).

He appeared on The Ed Sullivan Show in the 1950s. He also guest-starred on television series such as 87th Precinct, Green Acres, The Monkees, Get Smart, I Dream of Jeannie, Emergency!, and in his final role as Jack Brice in the 1978 episode High Rollers of Flying High on CBS.

In 1963, Barry was cast as Harry in the episode "Has Anyone Seen Eddie?" of Going My Way, with Gene Kelly, an adaptation of the 1944 film of the same name.

=== Nightclub career ===
Barry also worked as a club entertainer and comedian in Las Vegas. He started working stand-up in Vegas in 1946 at the El Rancho Vegas and the original Last Frontier, and later at the El Cortez and the Hacienda Resort. He worked as the opening act for famous performers such as Frank Sinatra, Judy Garland, and many more. He appeared with Wayne Newton at the height of Newton's popularity for more than a decade in the 1970s at the Frontier, Sands, and Desert Inn.

Barry also appeared regularly in comedy clubs across the U.S.: Chicago (Chez Paree); San Francisco (Bimbo's 365 Club); New York (Paramount Theatre); Austin Texas (The Paramount); Florida (The Americana); and Los Angeles (Billy Gray's Band Box, Slapsy Maxie's Nightclub, The Moulin Rouge, The Chi Chi, The Cocoanut Grove at the Ambassador Hotel, Charlie Foy's Supper Club, and Ciro's).

Nightclub work paired Barry with top names of the period, including Sammy Davis Jr., Judy Garland, Della Reese, Frank Sinatra, Liberace, The Four Step Brothers, Gypsy Rose Lee, and Tommy Dorsey. In June 1949, Barry was flown in for a one-month engagement at the London Palladium with The Marx Brothers (Harpo Marx and Chico Marx).

=== Personal life and death ===
Barry was the father of five children (Alan, Kerry, Steve, Dana, and Wendy) and was married to his wife, singer Ginny (Ginger), for over 50 years until his death from cancer in 2001.

== Filmography ==
=== Film ===
Year	Title	Role	Notes
1942	Kickin' the Conga 'Round	Bluto	voice uncredited
1942	Alona on the Sarong Seas	Bluto	voice uncredited
1942	A Hull of a Mess	Bluto	voice uncredited
1943	Seein' Red, White 'N' Blue	Bluto	voice uncredited
1943	Too Weak to Work	Bluto	voice uncredited
1944	Tangled Travels	George Givot / Narrator / Babbling Voices / Mad Russian	voice uncredited
1945	Life with Feathers	Radio Announcer	voice uncredited
1945	Goofy News Views	Commentator / Professor Crackabone / Joe the Riveter / Moe / Husband / Wife / Footballers / Professor Baggysacks	voice uncredited
1945	Hot Foot Lights	W.C. Fields / Jimmy Durante / Lew Lehr / Red Skelton	voice uncredited
1945	Hare Conditioned	Store Manager	voice uncredited
1946	Bacall to Arms	Bogey Gocart	voice uncredited
1947	Up n' Atom	Narrator / Mouse / Lady Cat Puppet imitating Mae West / Cat imitating Charles Boyer	voice uncredited
1947	Slick Hare	Humphrey Bogart	voice uncredited
1947	Kitty Caddy	Bob Hope / Bing Crosby	voice uncredited
1947	Catch as Cats Can	Frank Sinatra Canary	voice uncredited
1947	It's a Grand Old Nag	Mister Retake	voice uncredited
1947	Joe Palooka In The Knockout	Eddie Steele	
1948	Topsy Turkey	Indian / Turkey / Moose	voice uncredited
1948	Embraceable You	The Comic	uncredited
1948	Lo, the Poor Buffal	Buffalo Billingsly / Buffalo	voice uncredited
1949	The Coo-Coo Bird Dog	Parrot	voice uncredited
1949	Ladies of the Chorus	Ripple the Decorator	uncredited
1949	Curtain Razor	Bingo the Parrot	voice uncredited
1950	What's Up, Doc?	Al Jolson	voice uncredited
1950	8 Ball Bunny	Humphrey Bogart	voice uncredited
1954	Playgirl	Jonathan Hughes, Photographer	
1955	High Society	Palumbo the Pianist	
1957	Four Girls in Town	Vince	
1957	The Shadow on the Window	Miller	uncredited
1958	Voice in the Mirror	Quintet Pianist	
1958	Pre-Hysterical Hare	Elmer Fudd / Elmer Fuddstone	voice uncredited
1959	Some Like It Hot	Beinstock	
1965	Pinkfinger	Spy	voice
1966	Spinout	Harry	
1969	The Deadwood Thunderball	Rattfink	voice
1974	How to Seduce a Woman	Ticket Seller	
1979	Disco Sexpot		

=== Discography ===
Year	Title	Role	Notes
1947	Bugs Bunny and the Tortoise	Sneezing Duck	
1948	Bozo Under the Sea	swordfish, stingray, whale, clam, octopus, sailfish	
1948	Hershel In Hollywood	himself	
1953	Cock-a-Doodle Benny/Brand Me with Your Kisses	himself with Buddy Bregman	
1955	The Daffy Duck Song	Daffy Duck	
1955	Elmer Fudd	Bugs Bunny	
1955	Bugs Bunny Easter Song and Mr. Easter Rabbit	Bugs Bunny	
1955	Sylvester the Cat / Sylvester the Cat's Nine Lives	Sylvester the Cat	
1956	Do-It-Yourself Psychiatry	himself	
1956	Out Of This World With Flying Saucers	himself with Sara Berner	
1959	The Dave Barry Laugh Show	himself	
1960	Laughs for Losers	himself	
1965	Dog's Best Friend / H-H-Him	The Reporter with Daws Butler	
1968	The Interpreter. Dave Barry at the United Nations	himself	
1968	It's Fun to Be Jewish	himself	
1972	Will The Real Howard Hughes Please Stand Up?	himself with Selma Diamond	
1973	Golda Goes to Washington/Nixon Goes to Tel Aviv	himself	

=== Television ===
Year	Title	Role	Notes
1955	The Danny Thomas Show		episode: "The Benefit Show"
1957	M Squad	Richard Lowell	episode: "The Specialists"
1960	77 Sunset Strip	Himself	episode: "The Dresden Doll"
1961	87th Precinct	Doug Quinn	episode: "Run, Rabbit, Run"
1963	Going My Way	Harry	episode: "Has Anyone Seen Eddie?"
1967	The Monkees	Inspector Blount	S1:E26, "Monkee Chow Mein"
1969	The Pink Panther Show	Secret Agent #1 / Secret Agent #2	voice episode: "Pickled Pink/Ape Suzette+/Pinkfinger"
1969	Green Acres	Insurance Man	episode: "You and Your Big Shrunken Head"
1976	The Pink Panther Laugh-and-a-Half Hour-and-a-Half Show	Various characters	voice
1976–1977	Switch	Room Clerk / Wortheimer	2 episodes
1977	Emergency!	Tom Jensen	episode: "An Ounce of Prevention"
