= Who's Yehoodi? =

1930's American slang for a missing person

The catchphrase "Who's Yehoodi?" (or "Who's Yehudi?") originated when Jewish violinist Yehudi Menuhin was a guest on the popular radio program The Pepsodent Show hosted by Bob Hope, where sidekick Jerry Colonna, apparently finding the ethnic name inherently funny, repeatedly asked "Who's Yehudi?" Colonna continued the gag on later shows even though Menuhin himself was not a guest, turning "Yehudi" into a widely understood late 1930s slang reference for a mysteriously absent person. The United States Navy chose the name "Project Yehudi" for an early 1940s precursor to stealth technology, also known as Yehudi lights.

A song with the title and catchphrase "Who's Yehoodi?" was written in 1940 by Bill Seckler and Matt Dennis. It was covered by Kay Kyser and more famously by Cab Calloway. The final stanza of the song is:

The little man who wasn't there
Said he heard him on the air
No one seems to know from where
But who's Yehoodi?

Yehoodi makes an "appearance" in the 1941 Warner Bros. cartoon Hollywood Steps Out, sitting beside Jerry Colonna and watching exotic dancer Sally Rand. Yehoodi is depicted as an invisible man looking through a pair of binoculars. Colonna introduces himself by saying "Guess who?" then indicates his seat mate saying "Yehoodi". 1942's Crazy Cruise features the "S.S. Yehudi", an invisible battleship. Yehudi is referenced again in the 1971 Christmas episode of Morecambe and Wise with special guest, André Previn, who, in a sketch claims he only agreed to be on the show because he was told he would be conducting the orchestra with Yehudi Menuhin as his soloist. A telegram is then immediately delivered to the stage, supposedly from Yehudi, apologizing that he cannot be there.

Its double meaning of "Who Is Jewish?"—the word "Yehudi" means "Jew" in the Hebrew language—was emphasized in a short sound film ("soundie") of the song with variant lyrics made in 1943 with singer Lane Truesdale and the Kingsmen, in which a "living portrait" of a stereotypical, distinguished Jew with black hat and long beard steals prurient glances at Truesdale's swinging hips before finally announcing "I'm Yehoodi!".

The phrase may be considered antisemitic by some, but that was not necessarily its intent. Cab Calloway, among others, collaborated frequently with Jewish musicians, composers and agents in New York and showed serious appreciation of Jewish music and Yiddish in several of his popular numbers.

The national swing dance / lindy hop community website Yehoodi derives its name from this catchphrase.
