= Crazy Cruise =

1942 film by Robert Clampett

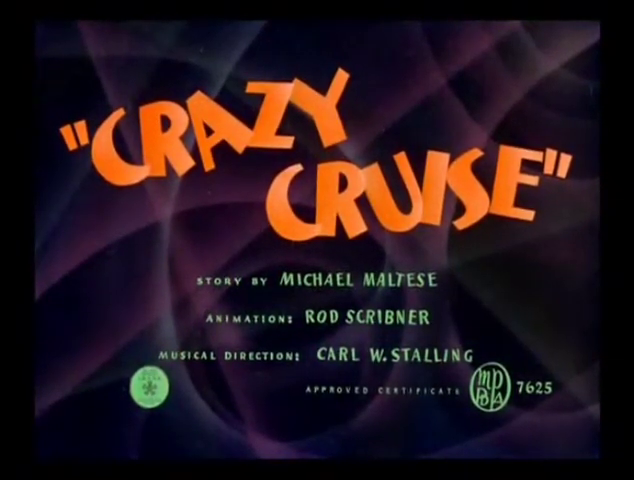
- Title card
- Directed by: Robert Clampett (uncredited)
- Story by: Michael Maltese
- Music by: Carl W. Stalling
- Animation by: Rod Scribner
- Color process: Technicolor
- Production company: Leon Schlesinger Productions
- Distributed by: Warner Bros. Pictures
- Release date: March 14, 1942
- Country: United States
- Language: English

Crazy Cruise is a 1942 American animated comedy short film directed by Robert Clampett. The cartoon was released on March 14, 1942. It is part of the Merrie Melodies series and the final cartoon to have any involvement from Fred Avery, who planned the short before leaving.

== Plot ==
The film is a series of unrelated gags involving places around the world.

- On a plantation in the Southern United States (The Sportsmen Quartet harmonize on "Swanee River" in the background), a tobacco worm is seen munching on a tobacco leaf. A rotoscoped hand holds a microphone near the worm. The worm launches into the fast-talking patter of a tobacco auctioneer, ending with "Sold to an American!" (parodying the tobacco auctioneer's famous chant, usually ending with "Sold to American!", meaning American Tobacco, in the Lucky Strike cigarette commercials heard on radio's Your Hit Parade) and expectorates the chewed tobacco into an off-screen spittoon.
- A map showing Florida and Cuba also traces the path of a cruise vessel. It takes a straight line from the Gulf Coast to Havana for a stop at Sloppy Joe's bar (the one Ernest Hemingway frequently hung out at). The drunken ship then takes a meandering series of aimless spirals, while "How Dry I Am" plays in the underscore.
- Now sailing along the ocean, the narrator points out the use of camouflage for a warship called the S.S. Yehudi (referencing one of Jerry Colonna's recurring jokes - "Who's Yehudi?"), which is invisible except for its crew, flags and the smoke billowing from its chimney.
- Now soaring over the Alps, a "low flying" airplane is seen skimming up and down the mountainsides like a skier.
- Still in the Alps, a comic triple shows a St. Bernard dog with a small keg of Scotch around its neck, followed by another St. Bernard with a keg of soda, and finally a St. Bernard pup carrying a smaller keg, containing "Bromo".
- An agile mountain goat springs from peak to peak, finally diving over a cliff and out of frame to a funny sound effect.
- In the "Sahara Desert", a number of pyramids appear, the narrator talking of how ancient they are - including stone renditions of the Trylon and Perisphere, which originally appeared at the 1939 New York World's Fair.
- The Sphinx is seen next, with the narrator describing how the stone figure just sits there, century after century. The Sphinx (voiced by Mel Blanc) then speaks to the camera, doing another Jerry Colonna schtick: "Monotonous... isn't it?"
- An oil well somewhere in Europe is about to yield a "gusher" for an axis of the United States. After some rumbling and pressure buildup, the well erupts - emitting just one large drop of oil, which lands in a spittoon (this one on-screen).
- Deep in the jungles of Africa an insect-eating plant is about to consume a "poor little" bumblebee. The plant chomps down on the bee, which then buzzes furiously inside the plant's mouth. In yet another spit joke, the plant finally expectorates the bee with a loud (yelled by Mel Blanc) "OUCH!" and the bee walks away smugly.
- A group of African animals is lined up at a "water hole", which turns out to be a functional drinking fountain, with an adult zebra holding a young zebra up to it.
- Flying over an African landscape, the narrator describes the features, reporting their possibly-nonsense names, leading up to a female-shaped body of water called Veronica Lake, suggesting the age of that joke that was later recycled frequently by Rocky and Bullwinkle.
- A pair of Caucasian safari hunters, dressed in white, led by a typical stereotyped pygmy guide, are in search of giant cannibals in the "Brawla Brawla Sooit region" (a reference to the lyrics of "The Hut-Sut Song"). The trio disappears behind some trees. After a silent pause, a loud clatter is heard. The pygmy runs out from behind the trees and (voiced by Blanc) shouts excitedly to the camera, in a mixture of pseudo African double-talk and the words of "The Hut-Sut Song". Pan to the left and the giant cannibals are holding the seemingly tiny (and now stunned and disheveled) white men, who resemble rolled up cigarettes. The cannibal holding the taller of the two men remarks, "King-Size!"
- Three cute little gray rabbits, one with a white chest, are playing in the jungle. The narrator's voice turns from softness to shouting panic as a vulture appears in the sky. The fearsome-looking bird, with a Japanese stereotyped face and Japanese flags on its wings, dives toward the bunnies. They run behind some weeds, which fall away revealing an anti-aircraft gun and the rabbits wearing Civil Defense white helmets. They fire loud volleys at the bird, which is blown away (off-screen). The rabbit that had its back to the audience turns and is revealed to be Bugs Bunny (also voiced by Blanc as usual), who faces the audience, gives the thumbs up sign with both hands, and says, "Eh, t'umbs up, Doc! T'umbs up!" At iris-out, only Bugs's ears are still on-screen, which spring into a "V for Victory" sign, as "We Did It Before (And We Can Do It Again)" plays in the underscore.

== Reception ==
Motion Picture Exhibitor (April 8, 1942): "A burlesque cartoon, this pokes fun at all things held sacred by serious travel cruises. High spots are a land of ferocious cannibals known as the Hut Sut tribe and a battleship camouflaged so perfectly that only men aboard are visible. It's vivisection of more pompous travel films. Good."

== Home media ==
This cartoon was released, uncut, uncensored and digitally remastered, on the fifth volume of the Looney Tunes Golden Collection.

== See also ==
- Looney Tunes and Merrie Melodies filmography (1940–1949)
- Bugs Bunny filmography
