= Jerry Colonna =

American musician, actor and comedian (1904–1986)

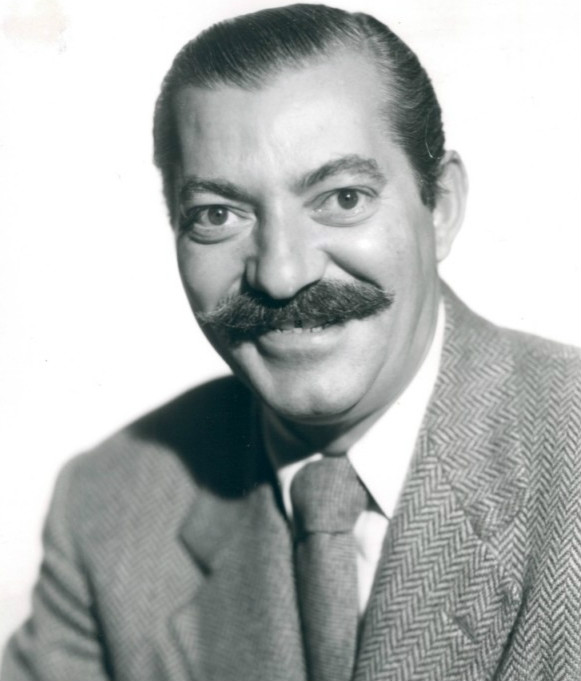
- Colonna in 1951
- Born: Gerardo Luigi Colonna; September 17, 1904; Boston, Massachusetts, U.S.
- Died: November 21, 1986 (aged 82); Los Angeles, California, U.S.
- Occupations: Musician; actor; comedian; singer; songwriter; trombonist
- Years active: 1935–1971
- Spouse: Florence Purcell (m. 1930)
- Children: 1

Gerardo Luigi Colonna (September 17, 1904 – November 21, 1986) was an American musician, actor, comedian, singer, songwriter and trombonist who played the zaniest of Bob Hope's sidekicks in Hope's popular radio shows and films of the 1940s and 1950s. He also voiced the March Hare in Walt Disney's 1951 animated feature film Alice in Wonderland.

== Biography ==
=== Early life ===
Gerardo Luigi Colonna was born in Boston in 1904; the son of Italian immigrants. His parents, Elisabetta Magro and Giuseppe Colonna, were originally from the town of Muro Lucano, in Potenza, Italy.

=== Musical career ===
Colonna started his career as a trombonist, in orchestras and dance bands in the Boston area; he can be heard with Joe Herlihy's Orchestra on discs recorded for Edison Records in the late 1920s. During the 1930s, Colonna played with the CBS house orchestra and the Columbia Symphony Orchestra, where he developed a reputation for prankishness and tomfoolery. During his tenure at CBS, he occasionally worked under bandleader Raymond Scott, and made several recordings with Scott's famous Quintette, which typically involved Colonna mouthing nonsense syllables over Scott's band. His off-stage antics were so calamitous that CBS nearly fired him, on more than one occasion. Fred Allen (then on CBS) gave Colonna periodic guest slots, and a decade later, he joined the John Scott Trotter band on Bing Crosby's Kraft Music Hall.

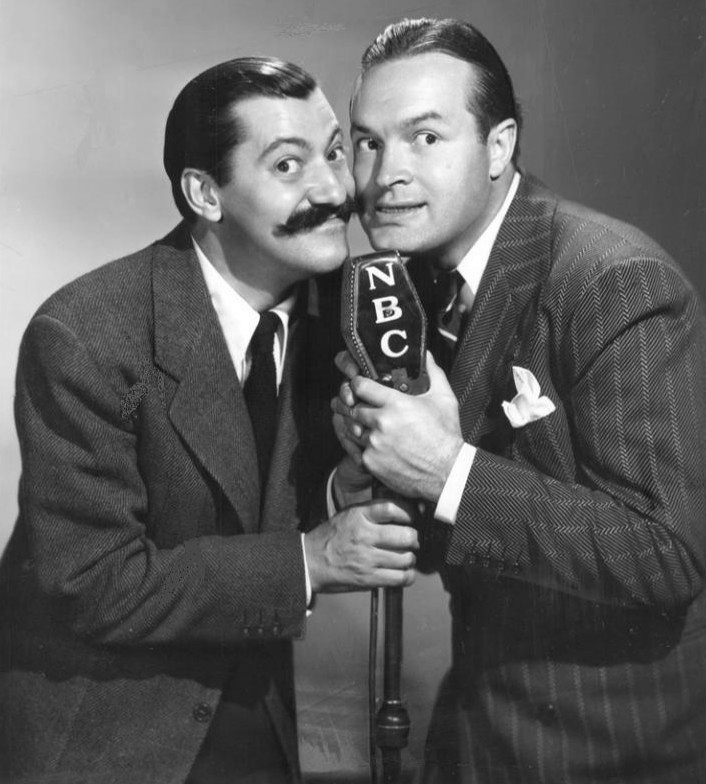
Colonna and Bob Hope on Hope's NBC radio program, 1940

Colonna was one of three memorable 1940s Kraft Music Hall discoveries. The others were pianist-comedian Victor Borge and Trotter's drummer, music "depreciationist" Spike Jones; Colonna performed on two songs for the 1938 Warner Bros. film Garden of the Moon, to memorable effect—"Girlfriend of the Whirling Dervish" and "Lady on the Three Cent Stamp", respectively.

Colonna took part in several of Bob Hope's early USO tours during the 1940s. Jack Benny's singing sidekick Dennis Day, a talented impressionist as well as a singer, did an effective imitation of Colonna's manic style and expressions.

=== Film and television ===
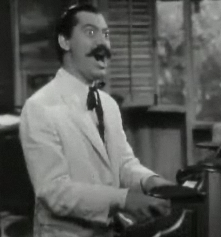
Colonna in Road to Singapore (1940)

Colonna featured in three of the popular Hope-Crosby Road To... films: Road to Singapore (1940) as Achilles Bombassa, Road to Rio (1947) as a Cavalry captain and The Road to Hong Kong (1962) in a cameo role.

He can also be seen in the Fred Allen vehicle, It's in the Bag! (1945), as psychiatrist Dr. Greenglass, and he made a brief appearance with Hope in the "Wife, Husband and Wolf" sketch in Star Spangled Rhythm. Colonna also appeared in one of the oldest surviving kinescope recordings of a live television broadcast, from 1947.

Colonna provided the voice of the March Hare in Walt Disney's 1951 animated feature film version of Alice in Wonderland, and also lent his zany narration style to several Disney shorts, including "Casey at the Bat" segment of the 1946 film Make Mine Music and the 1950 film The Brave Engineer. Colonna left Hope's show as a regular in 1950, but he continued appearing with Hope on holiday television specials and live shows. He hosted his own television comedy series, The Jerry Colonna Show, which only lasted a single season. In 1956, he performed the featured song "My Lucky Charm" in the film Meet Me in Las Vegas, starring Dan Dailey and Cyd Charisse.

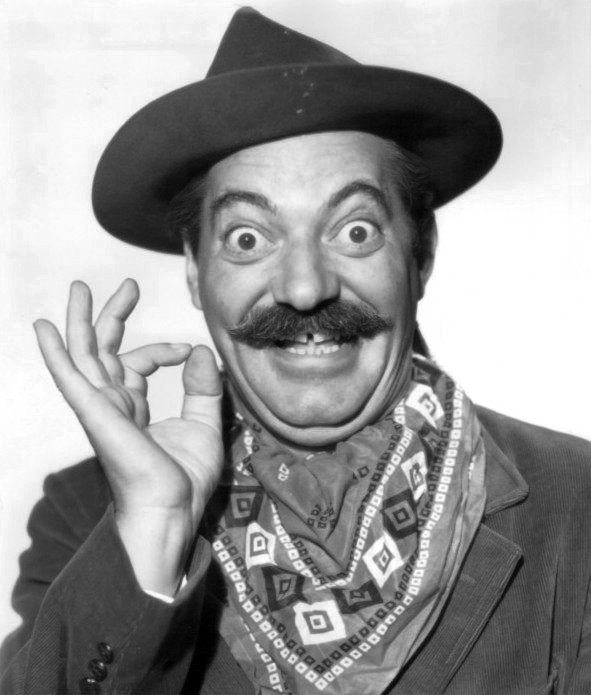
Colonna as host of his 1951 television show.

Colonna's television work also included voicing Moon Mad Tiger on Time for Beany, hosting the "Revenge with Music" episode on The Colgate Comedy Hour in 1954, serving as the second and last ringmaster/host/performer on Super Circus (1955–56), and appearing in a version of Babes in Toyland on Shirley Temple's Storybook in 1960.

He also made guest appearances in the 1957 Climax! episode "The Giant Killer"; the 1959 The Gale Storm Show episode "Come Back, Little Beatnik"; the 1965 McHale's Navy episode "Hello, McHale? Colonna!"; and the 1966 The Monkees episode "Don't Look a Gift Horse in the Mouth".

== Personal life ==
Colonna married Florence Purcell (Porciello) in 1930, after reportedly meeting her on a blind date. The couple adopted a son, Robert, in 1941. The marriage lasted 58 years, until his death in 1986.

Robert Colonna was involved in theater for nearly 60 years since first appearing on stage with his father. He was a member of the famed Trinity Repertory Company in Providence, Rhode Island. He was the founder and director of the Rhode Island Shakespeare Theater, directed many productions at Rhode Island College, and in 2007, published a biography of his father's life, Greetings, Gate!: The Story of Professor Jerry Colonna.

Colonna's great-great niece is American stand-up comedian Sarah Colonna.

== Death ==
After his guest appearance on The Monkees in 1966, Colonna suffered a paralyzing stroke, forcing him into retirement, with the exception of two brief cameo appearances in Bob Hope specials in the late 1960s and early 1970s. In 1979, Colonna suffered a heart attack, leaving him hospitalized at the Motion Picture and Television Hospital for the rest of his life.

Colonna died from kidney failure on November 21, 1986; he was 82 years old. His wife Florence, who had stayed by his side up to his death, died in 1994, at the same hospital he did.

== Comedic style ==
Colonna had the ability to stretch a syllable to extreme lengths, such as "Aaaaaaaaaaaaaaaaaaall, or nothing at aaaaaaaaaaaaaaaaaaall...". In addition to musical numbers, he worked this bit into Road to Rio, along with another of his catchphrases—the film's action periodically cuts to a cavalry riding to the rescue of Bing and Bob, when he exhorts his riders, "Chaaaaaaaaaaaaaaaaaaarge!" At the end of the film, when all is resolved and he is still "charging," he pulls-up and asks the audience, "Well, what do you know... we never quite made it. Exciting, though... wasn't it?!" Journalist Gerald Nachman noted that in one opera parody, Colonna "hollered" an aria in a “deadpan screech that became his trademark” on Bob Hope's show.

According to radio historian Arthur Frank Wertheim, in Radio Comedy, Colonna was responsible for many of the catchphrases on Hope's show, notably, "Give me a drag on that before you throw it away", a crack the cast came to use to lance any bragging. Colonna's usual salutation to Hope was, "Greetings, Gate!", something fans and listeners soon began repeating. Another was "Who's Yehudi?", which referred to anyone who wasn't there at the moment.

== Popular culture references ==
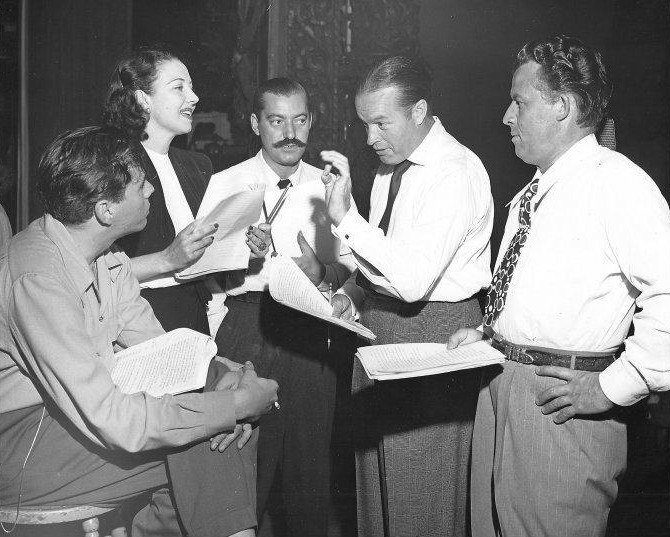
Bandleader Desi Arnaz, Barbara Jo Allen, Jerry Colonna and Bob Hope in the 1940s

Colonna was a popular radio and film figure at the same time that Warner Bros. cartoons hit their stride. Accordingly, his facial expressions and catchphrases were caricatured many times in the company's cartoons. Along with "Greetings, Gate!" variations and references to "Yehudi", several cartoons included variations on his oft-used observation, "Ahhhh, yes! [appropriate adjective], isn't it?!" Mel Blanc voiced most of Colonna's caricature appearances.

- In the 1938 Merrie Melodies cartoon A-Lad-In Bagdad, the Sultan is a Colonna caricature.
- In the Merrie Melodies cartoon Bars and Stripes Forever, the Warden's voice is based on Colonna's.
- In the Merrie Melodies cartoon Dangerous Dan McFoo, his character Peppino the Barber appears.
- In the Merrie Melodies cartoon Detouring America, a Colonna caricature makes a cameo as the "cowpunching" cowboy.
- In the Merrie Melodies cartoon Busy Bakers, one of the baker elves is a Colonna caricature.
- In the Looney Tunes cartoon Prehistoric Porky, a vulture sings in Colonna's voice.
- The Merrie Melodies cartoons The Wacky Worm (1941) and Greetings Bait (1943) both star a worm who is a Colonna caricature, complete with moustache and exaggerated voice. The latter cartoon, which also takes its title from Colonna's "Greetings, Gate" catchphrase, features an animated human Colonna as a fisherman.
- Jerry Colonna was one of the party-going celebrities caricatured in the 1941 Merrie Melodies cartoon Hollywood Steps Out.
- In the 1942 Looney Tunes cartoon The Ducktators, there is a rabbit that briefly appears and is a caricature of Colonna.
- In the 1943 Looney Tunes Daffy Duck cartoon The Wise Quacking Duck, Daffy imitates Colonna as a fortune teller.
- In the 1944 Merrie Melodies cartoon What's Cookin' Doc?, Bugs Bunny is saying "Hi" to various (unseen) Hollywood figures as they walk by his table at the Oscar banquet, and Bugs mimics them. At one point, he bugs his eyes, opens his mouth wide to display squared-off, gapped teeth, and says, "Ahhhh! Greetings, Jerry!"
- In the 1944 Merrie Melodies cartoon Slightly Daffy, a Native American warrior, mimicking Colonna, threatens cavalry soldier Porky Pig with "Greetings, Gate! Let's scalpitate!"
- In the 1944 Looney Tunes cartoon Plane Daffy, after his second electrifying kiss with Hata Mari, Daffy imitates Colonna: "Ahhhhhhh! Something new has been added!"
- In the 1944 Private Snafu cartoon Booby Traps, Snafu, after discovering one of the women in the harem house is a booby trap, imitates Colonna: "Ahhhhhhh! Something new has been added!"
- In the 1945 Merrie Melodies cartoon The Unruly Hare, as Elmer Fudd jams his rifle directly into Bugs Bunny's spine, Bugs warns, "Only a big, fat rat would shoot a guy in the back." But Fudd does pull the trigger, then wheels to the camera and defiantly admits, "So I'm a big, fat wat!" But Bugs emerges from the cloud of gunpowder smoke, and says in Colonna's voice, "Ahhhhhh, have some cheese, rrrrrat!" and smashes a hunk of cheese into Fudd's face.
- In the 1946 Looney Tunes cartoon Daffy Doodles, Daffy goes on trial for defacing posters by drawing mustaches on them. At the conclusion, an entire jury of mustachioed Jerry Colonnas delivers the verdict "Ahhhhhhh yes! Not guilty!"
- In the 1951 Looney Tunes cartoon Rabbit Every Monday, Bugs Bunny utters Colonna's trademark phrase "I don't ask questions, I just have fun!"

In the 1944 comedy Trocadero, Johnny Downs, in a vaudeville duo routine, dons a fake Colonna-style moustache and mimics Colonna's singing voice.

Colonna is mentioned in Jack Kerouac's 1957 novel On the Road.

In 1999, Jeff MacKay portrayed Colonna in the JAG episode "Ghosts of Christmas Past".

== Filmography ==
- Command Performance (1937)
- 52nd Street (1937) as Specialty Vocalist
- Rosalie (1937) as Joseph
- College Swing (1938) as Prof. Yascha Koloski (uncredited)
- Port of Seven Seas (1938) as Arab Rug Dealer (uncredited)
- Little Miss Broadway (1938) as Member of Band #3
- Valley of the Giants (1938) as Saloon Singer
- Garden of the Moon (1938) as Musician
- Swingtime in the Movies (1938) as The Texas Tornado
- Sweepstakes Winner (1939) as Nick, the Chef
- Naughty but Nice (1939) as Allie Gray
- Road to Singapore (1940) as Achilles Bombanassa
- Comin' Round the Mountain (1940) as Argyle Phifft
- Ice-Capades (1940) as Colonna
- Melody and Moonlight (1940) as Abner Kellogg
- You're the One (1941) as Dr. Colonna
- Sis Hopkins (1941) as Professor
- Star Spangled Rhythm (1942) as Colonna - Bob Hope Skit
- True to the Army (1942) as Pvt. "Pinky" Fothergill
- Priorities on Parade (1942) as Jeep Jackson
- Ice-Capades Revue (1942) as Theophilus J. Twitchell
- Atlantic City (1944) as The Professor
- It's in the Bag! (1945) as Dr. Greengrass - Psychiatrist
- Make Mine Music (1946) as Narrator (Segment "Casey at the Bat") (Voice)
- Road to Rio (1947) as Colonna
- Kentucky Jubilee (1951) as Jerry Harris
- The Brave Engineer (1950) as Narrator (Voice)
- Alice in Wonderland (1951) as March Hare (Voice)
- Meet Me in Las Vegas (1956) as Jerry Colonna - MC at Silver Springs
- Pinocchio (1957) as Ringmaster
- Andy Hardy Comes Home (1958) as Doc
- The Road to Hong Kong (1962) as Man Looking for a Match (uncredited)
