= Trocadero (Los Angeles) =

Former nightclub in California, US

Coordinates: 34.0924°N 118.3792°W

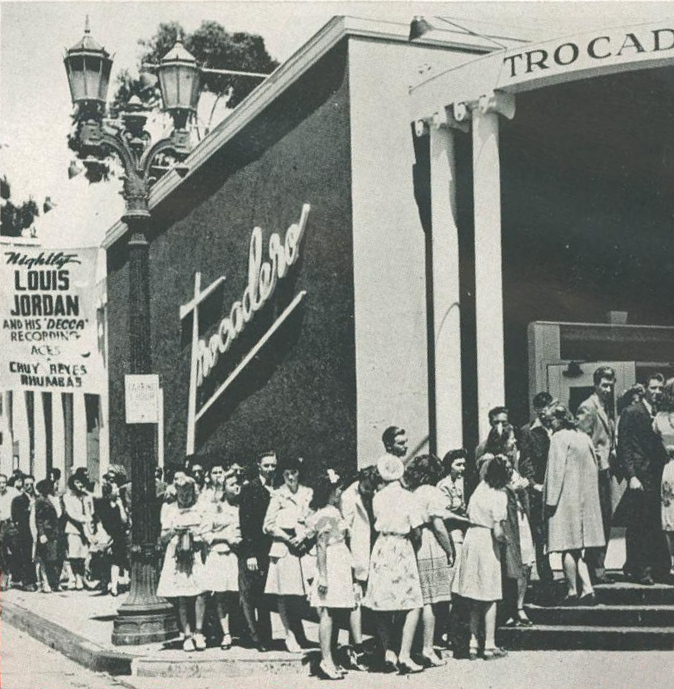
Fans line up outside the Trocadero for a concert by Louis Jordan (1944)

Cafe Trocadero was an upscale nightclub that opened on the Sunset Strip in 1934 and immediately became the place where Hollywood stars went to be seen. Photographs of the stars out on the town at the "Troc" one night might appear in The Hollywood Reporter the next day, as both Cafe Trocadero and THR were owned by William R. Wilkerson.

A black tie French-inspired supper club, at 8610 Sunset Boulevard in the posh Sunset Plaza section of the Strip, it was one of the most famous nightclubs in the world.

== Post-Wilkerson Management ==
In May 1938, Wilkerson announced that he had sold Cafe Trocadero to Nola Hahn, the owner of Club Continental, formerly the Airport Gardens, an illegal casino on Sonora Avenue in Glendale, California.

Within a year, however, Cafe Trocadero was under the management of Felix Young, a gambler with ties to producer B.P. Schulberg. Young got into a dispute over the lease with the landlord, Chateau Sunset Corp. and abruptly closed the nightclub in October 1939. Before the month was over, Cafe Trocadero was thrown into involuntary bankruptcy.

The club briefly reopened later that year as The Trocadero, in time to host the Hollywood premiere party for Gone with the Wind in December 1939. But by May 1940, the new owners were out of business and the club's furnishings were auctioned off.

Wilkerson later launched Ciro's nightclub and LaRue Restaurant, both also on the Strip. He was also the original developer of the Flamingo Las Vegas, but lost control of it to mobster Bugsy Siegel before construction was complete in 1946.

The cafe operated under a series of managers, including composer and businessman Turk Prujan. Many ads for the Trocadero in the California Eagle contained the headline "Turk Prujan Presents..." followed by a musical artist that was to perform at the club.

== Little Troc ==
In January 1942, just a few weeks after the bombing of Pearl Harbor, Felix Young opened a small night club six blocks west of the Cafe Trocadero site, at 9236 Sunset Blvd. on the Strip. His premiere act was an unknown singer, Lena Horne. Her sell-out performances there made her an overnight sensation in Hollywood and led to an engagement at Mocambo, another Strip nightclub, and a contract with Metro-Goldwyn-Mayer.

== Eddie LeBaron's Trocadero ==
In August 1943, bandleader Eddie LeBaron and his brother Albert Gastine opened a new club at 8610 Sunset called Eddie LeBaron's Trocadero. The club would become famous for featuring jitterbugging contests.

== Final days ==
After World War II, the Trocadero went through a series of owners and managers. It closed for good in 1947.

In its place stands a strip mall today.

== Celebrity patronage ==
Among the celebrities who frequented the Trocadero were Fred Astaire, Bing Crosby, Cary Grant, Myrna Loy, Jackie Gleason, Henry Fonda, Judy Garland, Lucille Ball, Desi Arnaz, Ted Healy, Jean Harlow, and Norma Shearer.

Actress/comedian Thelma Todd, who died mysteriously in December 1935, spent an evening at the Trocadero at a party thrown by Ida Lupino and her father Stanley. Todd had formerly been married to Pat DiCicco, and was angry that he had shown up there with another actress, Margaret Lindsay. The party was one of the last times that she was seen alive.

The Trocadero was the last place that Ted Healy was seen shortly before his death. He claimed he had been assaulted by three "college kids" and was found severely beaten. He died hours later from kidney failure.

== In popular culture ==
Cafe Trocadero was featured in the 1937 movie A Star is Born starring Janet Gaynor and Fredric March.

It was also parodied in the 1938 Warner Bros. cartoon, Porky at the Crocadero. The club also received a brief mention, via actual film footage, in 1944's What's Cookin' Doc?.

There was a mid-1940s low-budget film about the Trocadero and its history starring Ralph Morgan which bore little relation to reality.

The Trocadero is where Monroe Stahr, Communist Party member Brimmer, and Cecilia Brady eat dinner in Chapter 6 of F. Scott Fitzgerald's The Last Tycoon.

The Trocadero is mentioned in James Ellroy's Perfidia, the night before the Japanese bombed Pearl Harbor.

In David Fincher's 2020 film, Mank, the Trocadero is featured in a scene where Louis B. Mayer throws an election party for Frank Merriam. Randy Davison portrays the nightclub's maitre d'.

In The Seven Husbands of Evelyn Hugo by Taylor Jenkins Reid, the Trocadero is mentioned on page 67, "Maybe you do a picture with Don. After all, they can't print pictures of the two of you dancing at Ciro's or the Trocadero fast enough."

== Sunset Trocadero ==
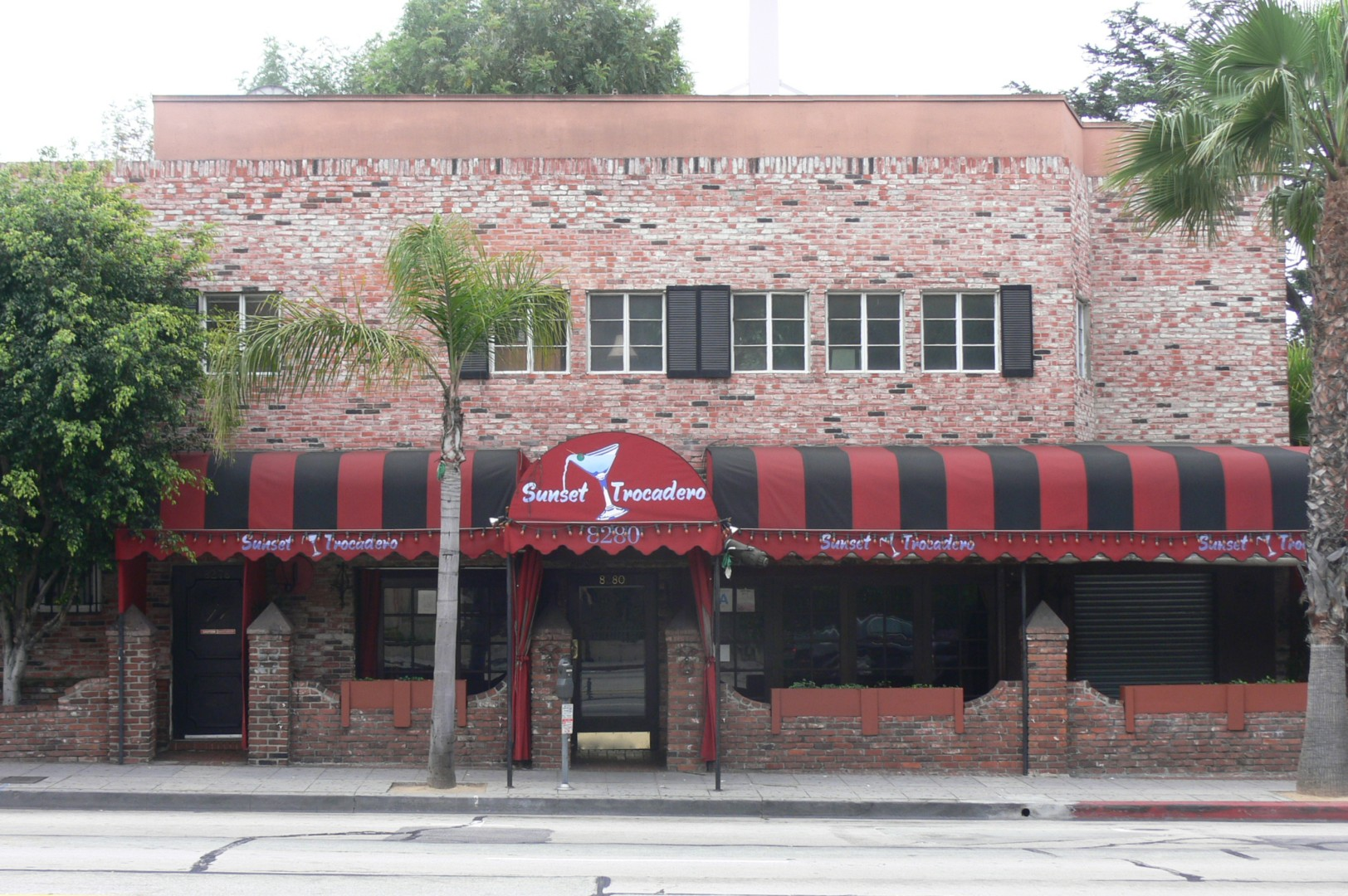
Sunset Trocadero

The building that housed Cafe Trocadero was demolished long ago and the property stood vacant until 2013 when it was replaced by an upscale storefront building. Today, a nightclub called Sunset Trocadero operates at 8280 Sunset Boulevard, about four blocks east of the former site of Cafe Trocadero. It was purchased by former NFL star Domata Peko of the Cincinnati Bengals and is run by his wife Anna Peko. Domata advertised a Super Bowl watch party for Cincinnati Bengals fans who are in Los Angeles for Super Bowl LVI, but couldn't afford or get tickets.
