= Mother Goose Goes Hollywood =

1938 Silly Symphony cartoon

- Theatrical release poster
- Directed by: Wilfred Jackson
- Produced by: Walt Disney
- Starring: The Blackbirds; Dave Weber; Clarence Nash; Thelma Boardman; Ann Lee; Sara Berner; Al Bernie
- Music by: Edward H. Plumb
- Animation by: Jack Campbell; Ward Kimball; Isadore Klein; Grim Natwick; Don Patterson; Robert Stokes
- Color process: Technicolor
- Production company: Walt Disney Productions
- Distributed by: RKO Radio Pictures
- Release date: December 23, 1938 (USA)
- Running time: 7 minutes
- Country: United States
- Language: English

Mother Goose Goes Hollywood is a 1938 Silly Symphonies animated short film produced by Walt Disney Productions and distributed by RKO Radio Pictures. The short was released on December 23, 1938. The film parodies several Mother Goose nursery rhymes using caricatures of popular Hollywood film stars of the 1930s. The film was directed by Wilfred Jackson and was the third-to-last Silly Symphony produced.

== Plot ==
This short depicts a series of sketches showing popular Hollywood stars of the day acting out traditional nursery rhymes.

Old King Cole is Hugh Herbert, his jester is Ned Sparks and his three fiddlers are The Marx Brothers. Joe Penner brings in a bowl containing special guest Donald Duck.

Rub-a-dub-dub is portrayed with Charles Laughton, Spencer Tracy and Freddie Bartholomew.

W. C. Fields plays Humpty Dumpty with special guest Charlie McCarthy.

Stan Laurel and Oliver Hardy play Simple Simon and the pieman.

See Saw Margery Daw is performed by Edward G. Robinson and Greta Garbo on a seesaw.

Eddie Cantor is Little Jack Horner in a big musical sequence featuring Cab Calloway, Fats Waller, and Stepin Fetchit. Others who appear are Wallace Beery, Clark Gable, George Arliss, Martha Raye, Fred Astaire, Joe E. Brown, Edna May Oliver, Mae West and ZaSu Pitts.

In a running gag, Katharine Hepburn appears at various points as Little Bo Peep.

== Reception ==
On July 2, 1938, Variety said: "Mother Goose Goes Hollywood. Also haywire. She thinks she is Leo the Lion and opens the picture with that Metro college yell, three leonine rahs. So in angles Katharine Hepburn Bo Peep with a Back Bay accent. She has lost her sheep on account of she looks hungry enough to eat a flock of mutton. While she is paging her sheep, up pops Hugh Herbert who looks more like a roast beef. He is dressed up like Old King Cole and calls for fiddlers three but all he gets is the Ritz Brothers... This is a preview of Mother Goose Goes Hollywood at the Pantages last night, and if you think the previewer is crazy, go and look at it yourself. A Walt Disney production for RKO-Radio release. Running time not long enough."

Since the 1960s, Mother Goose Goes Hollywood has been broadcast infrequently on television, due to the stereotypical depictions of black people in some scenes. It has occasionally been seen with the African Americans edited out, but as animation critic Charles Solomon noted in his book, Enchanted Drawings: History of Animation, that the caricatures of Fats Waller and Cab Calloway do not poke fun at their race, and are spoofed like the other caricatured celebrities seen in this cartoon.

== Voice cast ==
- The Blackbirds: Cab Calloway
- Dave Weber: Eddie Cantor, Charlie McCarthy, Joe Penner, Edward G. Robinson
- Clarence Nash: Donald Duck
- Thelma Boardman: Freddie Bartholomew
- Ann Lee: Martha Raye
- Sara Berner: Greta Garbo, Katharine Hepburn
- Al Bernie: Charles Laughton, W.C. Fields, Laurel and Hardy

== Home media ==
The short was released on December 19, 2006 in Walt Disney Treasures: More Silly Symphonies, Volume Two.

== See also ==
- Mickey's Gala Premiere
- Mickey's Polo Team
- The Autograph Hound
- Hollywood Steps Out
- Slick Hare
- Hollywood Daffy
- Felix in Hollywood
