= Mickey's Polo Team =

1936 Mickey Mouse cartoon

- Directed by: David Hand
- Produced by: Walt Disney
- Starring: Walt Disney; Clarence Nash
- Animation by: Art Babbitt; Johnny Cannon; Paul Hopkins; Dick Huemer; Grim Natwick; Bill Roberts
- Color process: Technicolor
- Production company: Walt Disney Productions
- Distributed by: United Artists
- Release date: January 4, 1936
- Running time: 8 minutes
- Country: United States
- Language: English

Mickey's Polo Team is a 1936 American animated short film produced by Walt Disney Productions and released by United Artists. The cartoon features a game of polo played between four Disney characters, led by Mickey Mouse, and four cartoon versions of real-life movie stars. It was directed by David Hand and was first released on January 4, 1936. The film was inspired by Walt Disney's personal love of polo. It was the 80th Mickey Mouse short film to be released, and the first of that year.

The cartoon features cameos of many Disney characters from the Mickey Mouse and the Silly Symphonies film series, as well as several real-world 1930s entertainment figures.

== Plot ==
Mickey Mouse is participating in a polo game, with a team that includes Goofy, the Big Bad Wolf, and Donald Duck, who is having trouble with his donkey. They are playing against Stan Laurel, Oliver Hardy, Harpo Marx, and Charlie Chaplin (for which he is in his Tramp outfit). Actor Jack Holt, who is serving as referee, throws the ball, which begins the game. First out is Oliver, who is knocked off his horse when the two teams fight to get the ball from the other. He is hit on the head with horseshoes while on the ground. The Big Bad Wolf takes the ball and manages to keep it ahead of the others but Charlie Chaplin soon steals the ball and hits it into one of the poles, using his cane to turn himself around to go in the other direction and keep up with the team. Meanwhile, Ollie is struggling to get back on his horse because of his overweight body. As Mickey hits the ball toward his home goal, Harpo Marx and his ostrich are forced to duck under the sand to avoid being hit. Ollie is finally able to get onto his horse but his weight causes the horse's body to sag in the middle.

In an attempt to make the horse stay up, Stan Laurel pulls Ollie's horse's tail out and ties it in a knot, which works. However, the horse refuses to get back in the game and no matter how hard Ollie tries to entice it, it stays in place. Stan tries to poke it with a needle to make it get going, but it takes off before he can do so, throwing Ollie off and having him get poked instead. In the game, the Big Bad Wolf takes the lead with the ball again, but loses his mallet in the process and uses his breath to make the ball go forward instead. Shirley Temple and The Three Little Pigs mock him for doing this and blow raspberries at him. He gets angry and pushes back by blowing the fence they are behind away and clouding them with dust, but the distraction causes him to lose his lead in the game. Donald Duck takes the lead and hits the ball, but Harpo Marx hits the ball back at him and the momentum behind the two to get the ball ends with them colliding.

Donald yells insults at him for knocking him off, but Harpo responds by punching him with boxers' mitts that he hides in his clothes, burns Donald with a blowtorch and uses a noisemaker to push him away, back to his donkey. The ball lands right next to him and he tries to hit it but the team takes it away. Frustrated, he tries to get his donkey to move but it sits on him, laughing. It then kicks him into the ground where the ball lands on his tail and he is trampled by the other players (including Ollie, who finally manages to get back in the game). Donald throws a tantrum and accidentally swallows the ball, causing the teams to chase after him to get it out. Harpo hits him first, using the head of his ostrich, and the Big Bad Wolf manages to briefly get the ball out by hitting him but it bounces back inside Donald. All of the players from both teams try to hit him which eventually causes him to dig into the sand to escape. Donald tries to hide inside a pole but the teams continue to try to hit him out. Finally, he rips the pole off its base and leads both teams toward referee Jack Holt, which causes everyone to collide and make the horses end up riding their owners and continue the game in that way.

== Reception ==
The Film Daily called the short "a knockout", saying: "For fast and furious animated entertainment, this just about tops anything turned out to date by the Walt Disney shops... It was a grand idea and the Disney boys put a lot of ingenuity and effort into it, resulting in a cartoon comedy that is one big riot from start to finish."

== List of celebrities spoofed ==
In detail the characters are:

- Referee: Jack Holt

The "Mickey Mousers" team:

- Mickey Mouse
- Goofy as "The Goof"
- Big Bad Wolf
- Donald Duck, riding Jenny the donkey

The "Movie Stars" team:

- Stan Laurel
- Oliver Hardy
- Harpo Marx, riding an ostrich
- Charlie Chaplin

Spectators:

- Shirley Temple, seated with the Three Little Pigs
- Charles Laughton, dressed as Henry VIII
- Eddie Cantor
- W. C. Fields
- Harold Lloyd
- Greta Garbo, waving a Pom-pon
- Edna May Oliver, seated next to Max Hare, from The Tortoise and the Hare
- Clark Gable, seated with a star-struck Clarabelle Cow
- Pluto
- Fifi the Peke
- Two Easter Bunnies, from Funny Little Bunnies
- The Wise Little Hen, from The Wise Little Hen
- The Flying Mouse and his mother, from The Flying Mouse
- Peter and Polly Penguin, from Peculiar Penguins
- King Midas and Goldie the Elf, from The Golden Touch
- Ambrose Puss the Cat and Dirty Bill the Dog Robber, from The Robber Kitten
- Cock Robin and Jenny Wren, from Who Killed Cock Robin?

== Voice actors ==
- Mickey Mouse: Walt Disney
- Donald Duck: Clarence Nash
- Goofy: Pinto Colvig
- Big Bad Wolf: Billy Bletcher
- Clarabelle Cow: Elvia Allman
- Movie stars: Carter Burns

== Home media ==
The short was released on December 4, 2001, on Walt Disney Treasures: Mickey Mouse in Living Color and on the "Walt Disney's Classic Cartoon Favorites Extreme Sports Fun" Volume 5.

== See also ==
- Mickey's Gala Premiere
- Mother Goose Goes Hollywood
- The Autograph Hound
- Mickey Mouse (film series)
