= Harpo Marx =

American comedian (1888–1964)

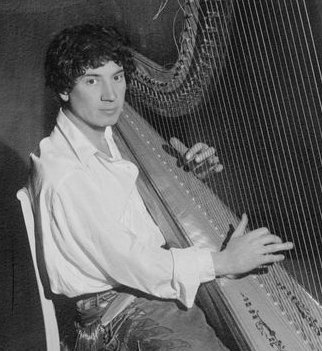
- Marx c. 1926
- Born: Adolph Marx; November 23, 1888; New York City, New York, U.S.
- Died: September 28, 1964 (aged 75); Los Angeles, California, U.S.
- Occupations: Comedian; actor; mime artist; harpist
- Years active: 1910–1964
- Spouse: Susan Fleming (m. 1936)
- Children: 4, including Bill Marx
- Parents: Sam "Frenchie" Marx (father); Minnie Schönberg (mother)
- Relatives: Chico Marx (older brother); Groucho Marx (younger brother); Gummo Marx (younger brother); Zeppo Marx (younger brother); Al Shean (maternal uncle); Arthur Marx (nephew); Miriam Marx (niece); Melinda Marx (niece)

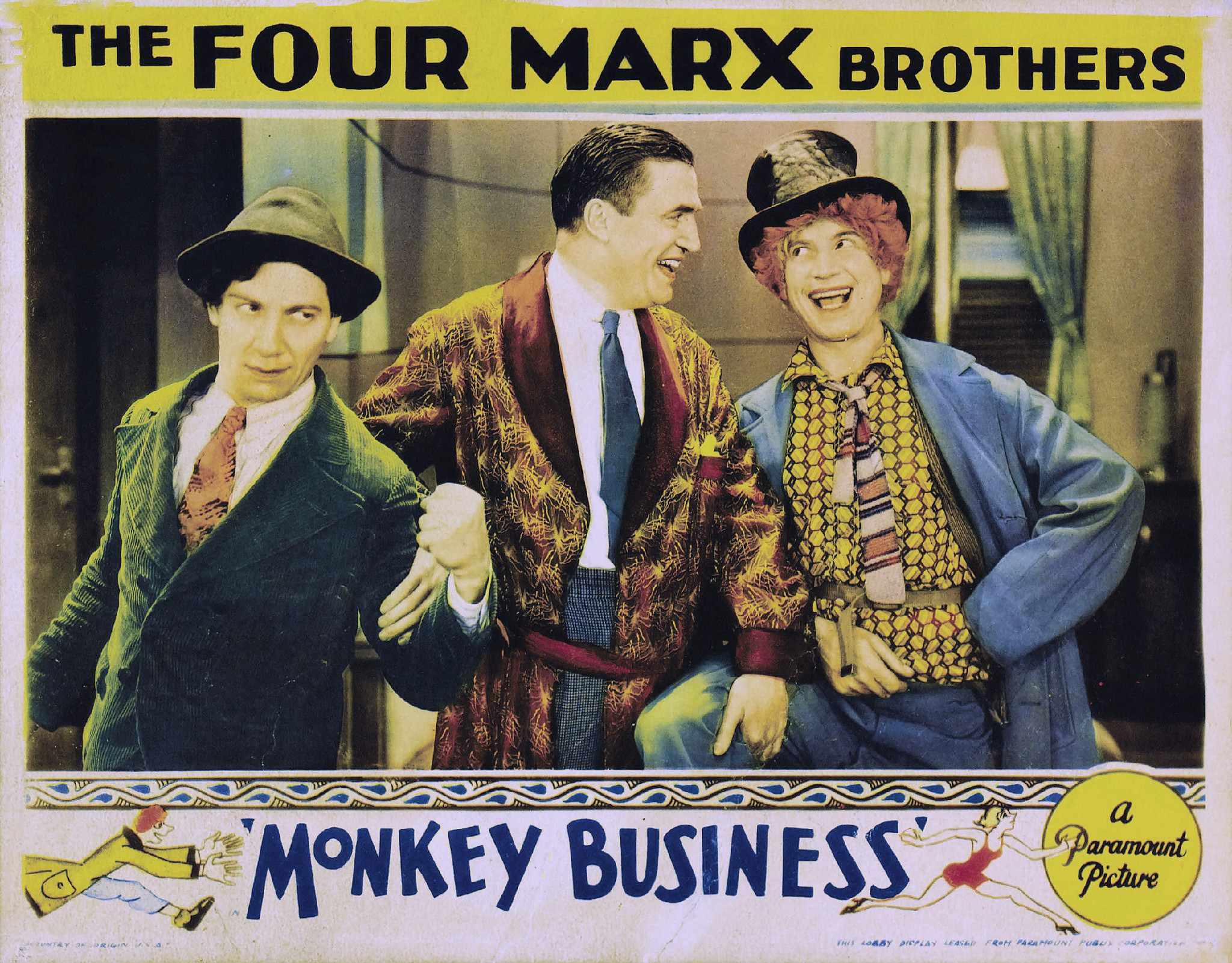
Lobby card for Monkey Business (1931) with Chico (left) and Harpo (right)

Arthur "Harpo" Marx (born Adolph Marx; November 23, 1888 – September 28, 1964) was an American comedian, actor and harpist, and the second-oldest of the Marx Brothers. In contrast to the mainly verbal comedy of his brothers Groucho and Chico, Harpo's comic style was visual, being an example of vaudeville, clown and pantomime traditions. In all of his movie appearances, he wore a curly reddish blonde wig and did not speak, instead blowing a horn or whistling to communicate. Marx frequently employed props such as a horn cane constructed from a lead pipe, tape, and a bulbhorn.

Most of the Marx Brothers' stage and film appearances included a song performed by Harpo on the harp in his unique style, for example "When My Dreams Come True" in The Cocoanuts (1929) and "Alone" in A Night at the Opera (1935).

== Early life ==
Harpo was born on November 23, 1888, in Manhattan, New York City. He grew up in Yorkville, a neighborhood now known as Carnegie Hill, on the Upper East Side of Manhattan, on East 93rd Street off Lexington Avenue. The turn-of-the-century tenement that Harpo later called "the first real home I can remember" was situated in a neighborhood populated with European immigrants, mostly artisans. The neighborhood hosted many historic homes and other buildings, such as the William Goadby Loew House (now the Spence School), the Congregation Shaare Zedek, and the Virginia Graham Fair Vanderbilt house.

His parents were Sam Marx (known by his nickname "Frenchie"/"Frenchy") and his wife, Minnie Schoenberg Marx, sister of comedian and vaudeville performer Al Shean. Marx's family was Jewish. His mother was from East Frisia, Germany, and his father, a tailor, was from Alsace, which was part of the Second French Empire at Sam's birth and for most of his childhood.

Harpo received little formal education; he dropped out of New York Public School 86 during his second attempt to pass the second grade, when he was eight, mainly because of bullying.. He began to work in numerous odd jobs alongside his older brother Chico, including selling newspapers, working in a butcher shop, and as an office errand boy, to contribute to the family income.

== Career ==
=== On stage ===
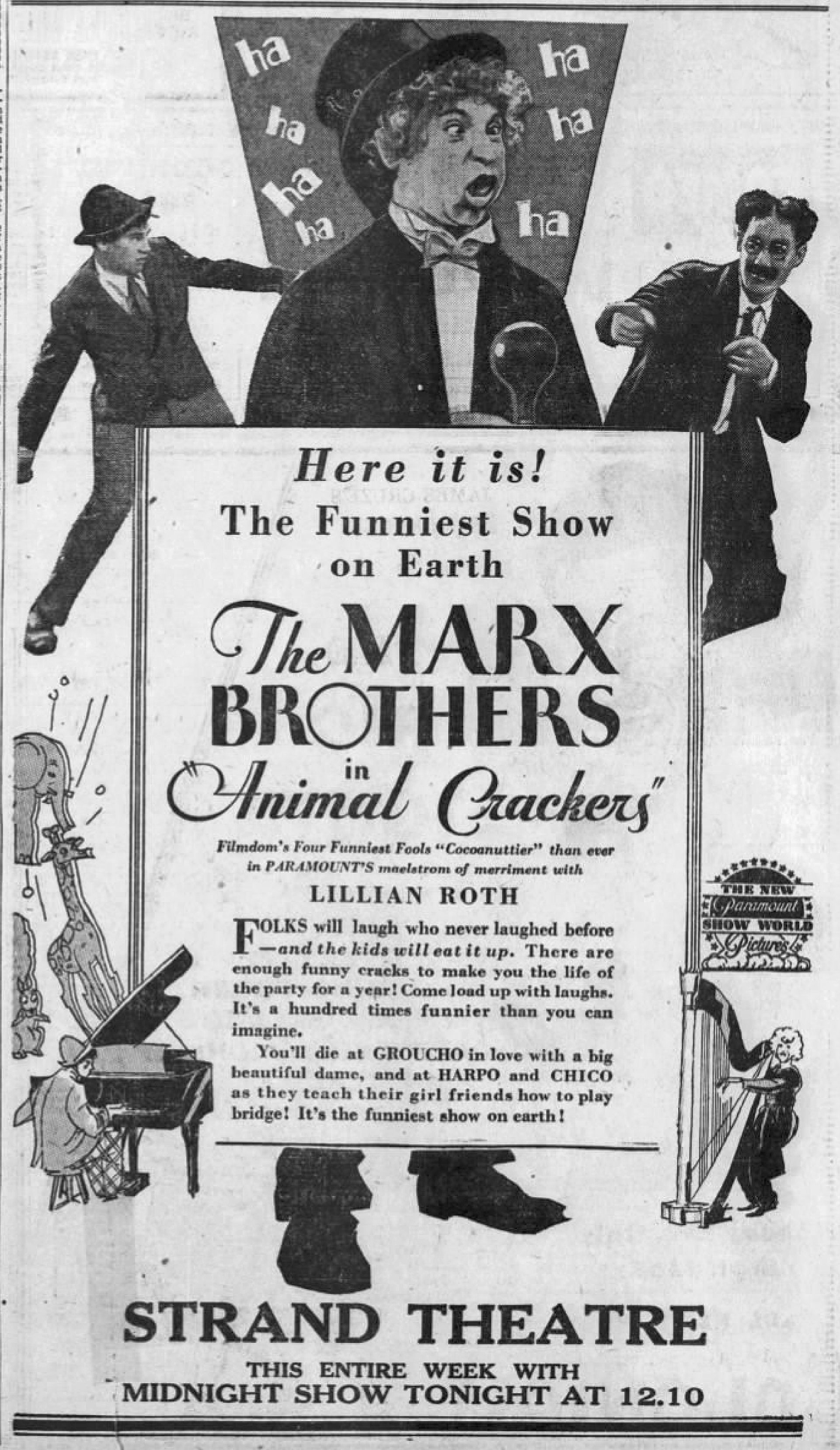
Newspaper ad for Animal Crackers (1930) with Lillian Roth paragraph

In January 1910, Harpo joined two of his younger brothers, Julius (later "Groucho") and Milton (later "Gummo"), to form "The Three Nightingales", which would later be renamed "The Marx Brothers". Multiple unverified stories attempt to explain Harpo's evolution as the "silent" character in the brothers' act. In his memoir, Groucho wrote that Harpo simply was not very good at memorizing dialogue, and thus was ideal to portray the archetypal vaudeville role of the "dunce who couldn't speak." It has also been said that Harpo reinvented himself as a mute clown by 1915 due to his nerves around speaking on stage; he even turned down an offer of US$50,000 to say the single word "Murder!" in A Night in Casablanca in 1946. He did however sometimes speak in live performances.

Differing stories exist regarding the origin of the Harpo stage name. The stories agree that the pseudonym originated during a card game at which Art Fisher, the dealer that night, referred to Marx as "Harpo" because he played the harp. There is disagreement regarding the time and place of the game, however. In his autobiography Harpo Speaks!, Harpo said that it took place in Rockford, Illinois. The most common version of the story places it at the Orpheum Theatre in Galesburg, Illinois. However, this version of events is disputed, at least partially because the Orpheum Theatre was not constructed until late 1916, whereas Harpo later remembered acquiring the name in 1914. In addition, Fisher is believed to have left vaudeville in 1912. Some sources give an earlier date for its origin and suggest the game may have instead taken place at the Galesburg Auditorium Theatre or the same town's Gaiety Theatre.

Harpo learned how to hold the harp by emulating a harp-playing angel in a picture he saw in a five-and-dime. No one in town knew how to play the harp, so Harpo tuned it as best he could, starting with one basic note and tuning it from there. He began learning to play the instrument without lessons. Three years later, he found out he had tuned it incorrectly, but that his method placed much less tension on the strings. Despite Harpo's musical talent, he never learned to read or write music. Although he paid top musicians handsome fees to teach him "proper" harp-playing technique, he maintained his unique style his entire life (his "teachers," fascinated by his technique, spent their sessions watching and listening as Marx performed). The major exception was Mildred Dilling, the professional harpist who finally taught Harpo proper harp technique and collaborated with him regularly when he had difficulty composing. Upon his death in 1964, one of Harpo's harps was donated to the state of Israel, and eventually found a home in an Israeli orchestra.

Chico found Harpo some of his first jobs. He and Chico were co-workers, playing piano to accompany silent films. Unlike Chico, Harpo could play only two songs on the piano, "Waltz Me Around Again, Willie" and "Love Me and the World Is Mine", but he adapted this small repertoire in different tempos to suit the action on the screen. He was also seen playing a portion of Rachmaninoff's "Prelude in C# minor" in A Day at the Races, and played piano in A Night at the Opera. Ultimately, he relinquished the piano to Chico in favor of his trademark harp, upon which he performed Nacio Herb Brown's 1935 song "Alone", which was sung in the film by Kitty Carlisle and Allan Jones.

Harpo had changed his name from "Adolph", a name he disliked (as a child, he was routinely called "Ahdie" instead), to "Arthur" by 1911. The similarity to the name of prominent Chicago show business attorney Adolph Marks may have further encouraged the change. Urban legends incorrectly said that the name change came about during World War I due to anti-German sentiment in the US, or during World War II because of the stigma that Adolf Hitler imposed on the name.

=== On film ===
His first screen appearance was in the film Humor Risk (1921), with his brothers, although according to Groucho it was screened only once and then lost. Four years later, Harpo appeared without his brothers as the "Village Peter Pan" in Too Many Kisses, which predated the brothers' first collaborative film, The Cocoanuts. by four years. The Cocoanuts was the first of the Marx's many talkies, and also the first film to use an overhead camera shot, at least five years before Busby Berkeley is said to have first used the technique in his 1936 film Lullaby of Broadway to film a kaleidoscopic women's dance routine. In Too Many Kisses, Harpo spoke the only line he ever spoke on-camera in a film, saying "You sure you can't move?" to the film's tied-up hero before punching him; however, it was a silent film, and the audience only saw his lips move and the line on a title card.

Harpo was often cast as Chico's eccentric partner-in-crime, whom he would often help by playing charades to tell of Groucho's problem, and/or annoy by giving Chico his leg, as an alternative to a handshake or simply to rest the leg.

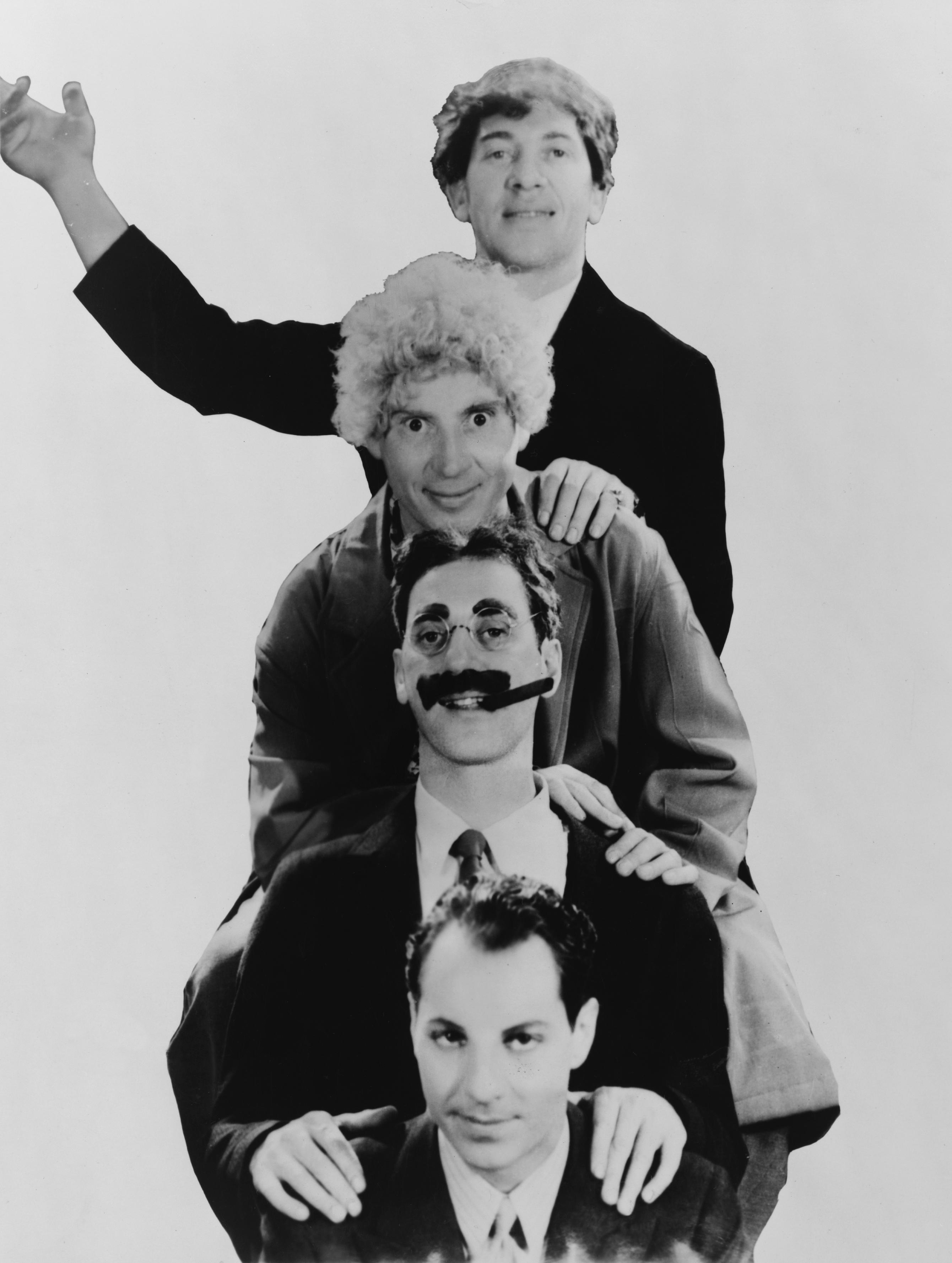
The four Marx Brothers. From the top down: Chico, Harpo, Groucho, and Zeppo, c. 1931

Harpo became known for prop-laden sight gags, in particular the seemingly infinite number of odd things stored in his topcoat's oversized pockets. In the film Horse Feathers (1932), Groucho, referring to an impossible situation, tells Harpo that he cannot "burn the candle at both ends"; Harpo immediately produces from within his coat pocket a candle burning at both ends. In the same film, a homeless man on the street asks Harpo for money for a cup of coffee; he produces a steaming cup, complete with saucer, from inside his coat. Also in Horse Feathers, he has a fish and a sword, and when he wants to go to his speakeasy, he stabs the fish in its mouth with his sword to give the password, "Swordfish". In Duck Soup, he produces a lit blowtorch to light a cigar.

Harpo often used facial expressions and mime to get his point across instead of speaking. One of his facial expressions, which he used in every Marx Brothers film and stage play, beginning with Fun in Hi Skule, was known as "the Gookie"; Harpo mimicked the expression of Mr. Gehrke, a New York tobacconist who made a similar face while concentrating on rolling cigars.

Harpo further distinguished his character by wearing a "fright wig". Early in his career, it was dyed pink, as evidenced by color film posters and by allusions to it in black-and-white films, with character names such as "Pinky" in Duck Soup. In some films Harpo wore a blonde wig, of similar appearance on black-and-white film. Over time, he darkened the pink to more of a reddish color, which films again alluded to with character names, such as the name of his character in A Night in Casablanca, "Rusty".

His not speaking in his early films was occasionally referred to by the other Marx Brothers, who were careful to imply that his character's not speaking was a choice rather than a disability. In reality, the decision to remain silent began when Harpo received a negative review, part of which suggested that Harpo's portrayal of a fool was convincing only until he spoke. Soon after, the Brothers' uncle shared with Harpo a script he had written for them. Harpo was dismayed to find he had just three lines and said to his uncle, "Well, maybe I won't talk at all!" This was meant sarcastically, but his uncle genuinely liked the idea. His brothers would make joking reference to this part of his act. For example, in Animal Crackers, his character was ironically dubbed "The Professor". In The Cocoanuts, this exchange occurs:

Groucho: "Who is this?"
Chico: "Atsa my partner, but he no speak."
Groucho: "Oh, that's your silent partner!"

In later films, Harpo was repeatedly put in situations where he attempted to convey a vital message by whistling and pantomime, reinforcing the idea that his character was unable to speak.

The Marxes' film At the Circus (1939) contains a unique scene where Harpo is heard saying "A-choo!" twice, as he sneezes.

=== Tour in the Soviet Union ===
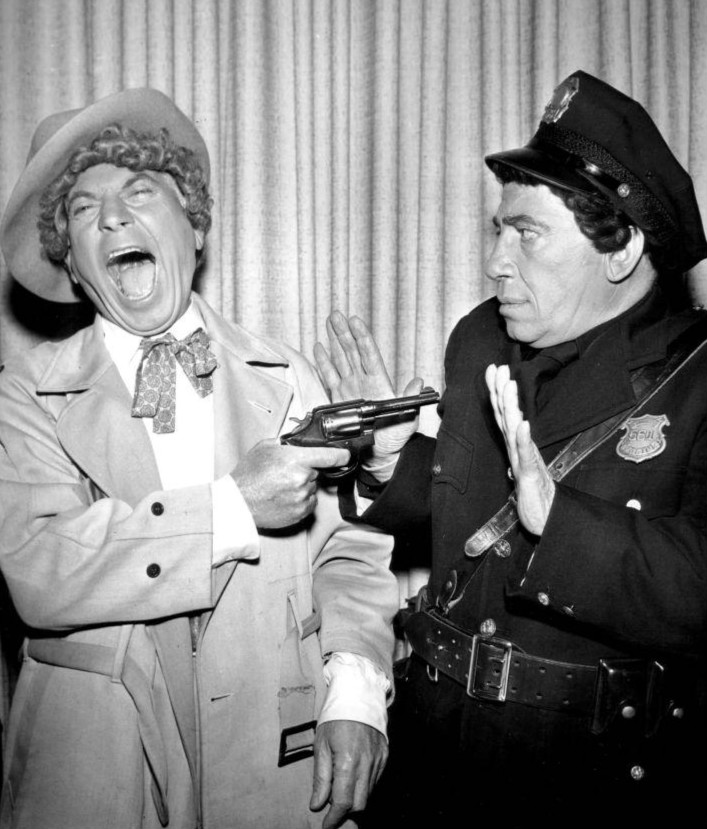
Harpo and Chico Marx in The Incredible Jewelry Robbery (1959)

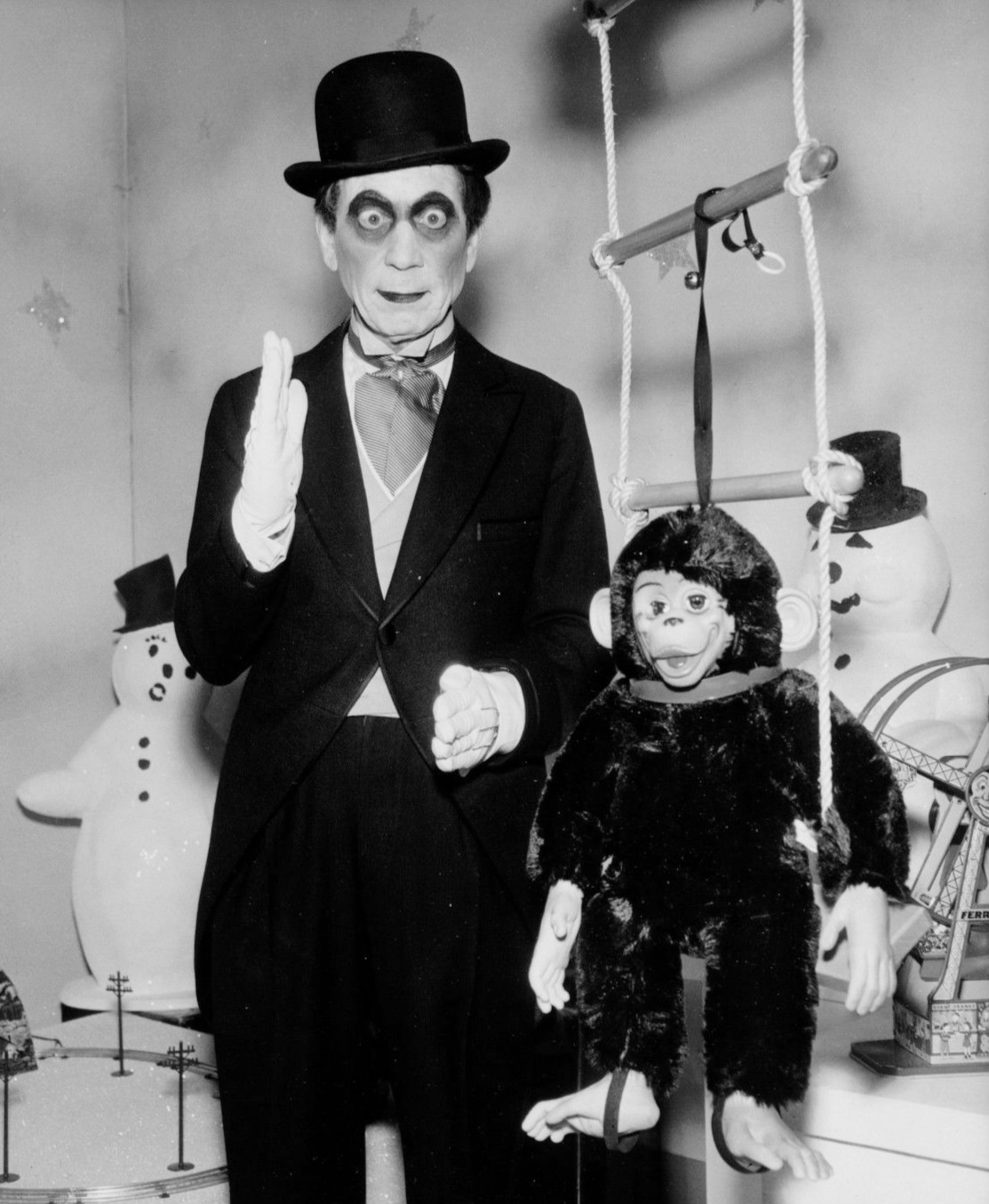
Marx as the "mechanical man" in A Silent Panic (1960)

In 1933, following U.S. diplomatic recognition of the Soviet Union, Harpo spent six weeks in Moscow as a performer and goodwill ambassador. His tour was a huge success, and the show ran for six weeks. Harpo's name was transliterated into Russian, using the Cyrillic alphabet, as "ХАРПО МАРКС," which is how he was billed during his Soviet Union appearances. Harpo, having no knowledge of Russian, pronounced it as "Exapno Mapcase". At that time, Harpo and the Soviet Foreign Minister Maxim Litvinov became friends.

During this time he served as a secret courier, delivering communiques to and from the US embassy in Moscow at the request of Ambassador William Christian Bullitt Jr., smuggling the messages in and out of the Soviet Union by taping a sealed envelope to his leg beneath his trousers. Marx recounted his relief at his voyage's end: "I pulled up my pants, ripped off the tape, unwound the straps, handed over the dispatches from Ambassador Bullitt, and gave my leg its first scratch in ten days."

== In other media ==
In 1936, he rode an ostrich on a team of polo-playing film stars who appeared as caricatures in the Walt Disney Production's Mickey's Polo Team, alongside Charlie Chaplin and Laurel and Hardy. Walt Disney would later feature Harpo (with Groucho and Chico) as one of King Cole's "Fiddlers Three" in the Silly Symphony Mother Goose Goes Hollywood. Harpo was also caricatured in Fleischer Studios' Popeye cartoon Sock-A-Bye Baby (1934), in which Harpo's harp playing awakens Popeye's baby, resulting in Popeye punching Marx, apparently fatally (as suggested when Harpo develops a halo and ascends to the heavens). Friz Freleng's 1936 Merrie Melodies cartoon The Coo-Coo Nut Grove caricatured Harpo, one of multiple celebrities appearing as an animal, as a bird with a red beak who chases a "woman" who is later revealed to be Groucho.

Harpo also took an interest in painting. Some of his works can be seen in his autobiography, in which he recalls having tried to paint a nude female model, but that he had frozen up because he simply did not know how to paint properly. The model, pitying Marx, taught him some basic brush strokes. Eventually, the original project was abandoned in lieu of a painting, by the model herself, of a fully-clothed Harpo. Marx himself was the subject of a sketch by Salvador Dalí, who was Harpo's friend and wrote the screenplay Giraffes on Horseback Salad.

Harpo recorded an album of harp music for RCA Victor (Harp by Harpo, 1952) and two for Mercury Records (Harpo in Hi-Fi, 1957; Harpo at Work, 1958).

Harpo made television appearances through the 1950s and 60s, including a 1955 episode of I Love Lucy, in which he and Lucille Ball re-enacted the famous mirror scene from Duck Soup. Both Marx and Ball, clad in his typical clothes, portray Harpo. He also appeared on NBC's The Martha Raye Show circa 1950. Harpo and Chico appeared in the May 8, 1959, episode of General Electric Theater titled "The Incredible Jewelry Robbery" entirely in pantomime. The episode concluded with a brief surprise appearance by Groucho. In 1960, Marx appeared in his first dramatic role, in an episode of The DuPont Show with June Allyson titled "A Silent Panic". Harpo plays a deaf-mute who witnesses a gangland murder while working as a "mechanical man" in a department store window. In 1961, to publicize his autobiography Harpo Speaks!, he appeared on The Today Show, Play Your Hunch, Candid Camera, I've Got a Secret, Here's Hollywood, Art Linkletter's House Party, Groucho's You Bet Your Life, The Ed Sullivan Show.

In November 1961, he guest-starred with Carol Burnett in an installment of The DuPont Show of the Week titled "The Wonderful World of Toys". The show was filmed in Central Park and featured Marx playing "Autumn Leaves" on the harp. Other stars appearing in the episode included Eva Gabor, Audrey Meadows, Mitch Miller and Milton Berle. A visit to the set inspired poet Robert Lowell to pen his poem Harpo Marx.

Late 1962 brought Harpo's final pair of television appearances, which aired within a month of each other. He portrayed a guardian angel on the September 25 episode of CBS's The Red Skelton Hour. His final role, opposite show star Fess Parker, was as himself on the October 20 episode, "Musicale", of ABC's sitcom Mr. Smith Goes to Washington (based on Frank Capra's film of the same name).

Harpo did sometimes speak in live performances, often charitable, and had a good speaking voice. Sound recording was not generally available and it was thought that there was no record of his speech. It was advertised that he would speak, and indeed he spoke extensively, narrating a Marx Brothers version of Prokofiev's Peter and the Wolf, delivering a "Red's speech", and making topical political references, at a fundraising event by the Riverside Symphony Orchestra in southern California in March 1964 and, for the first time, his performance was recorded. The recording was misfiled and not publicised, but was discovered in 2026, and released under the name "Harpo Speaks!".

== Personal life ==
Marx and three of his children wearing Harpo wigs in Los Angeles, 1954

Harpo's September 28, 1936, marriage to actress Susan Fleming became public knowledge the next month due to a congratulatory telegram sent by President Franklin D. Roosevelt. Harpo's marriage, like Gummo's, was lifelong (Groucho was divorced three times, Zeppo twice, and Chico once). The couple adopted four children: Bill, Alex, Jimmy, and Minnie. When he was asked by George Burns in 1948 how many children he planned to adopt, he answered, "I'd like to adopt as many children as I have windows in my house. So when I leave for work, I want a kid in every window, waving goodbye."

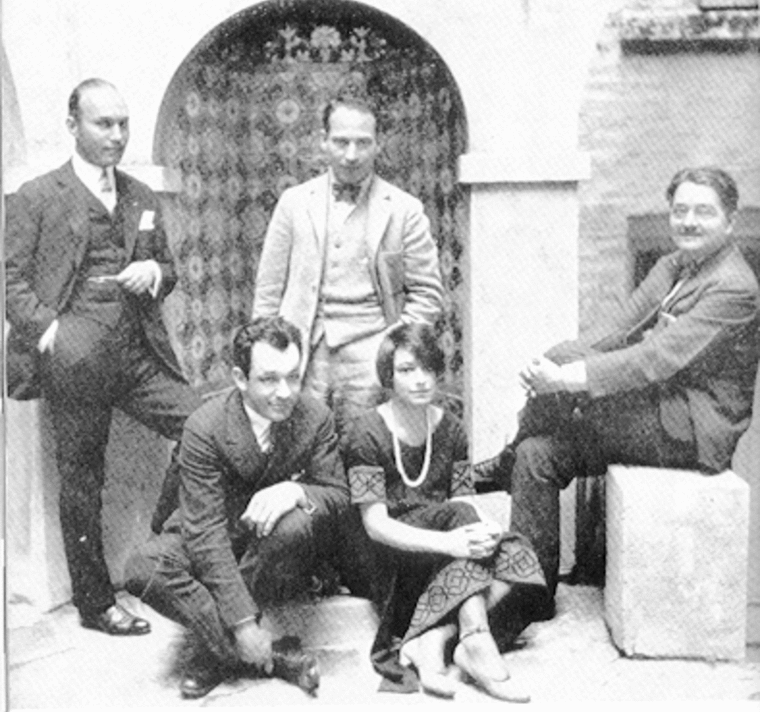
Members and associates of the Algonquin Round Table: (standing, left to right) Art Samuels and Harpo Marx; (sitting) Charles MacArthur, Dorothy Parker, and Alexander Woollcott

Harpo was good friends with theater critic Alexander Woollcott, alongside whom he became a regular member of the Algonquin Round Table. He once said his main contribution was to be the audience for the quips of other members. In their play The Man Who Came to Dinner, George S. Kaufman and Moss Hart based the character of "Banjo" on Harpo. Harpo later played the role in Los Angeles opposite Woollcott, himself the inspiration for the character of Sheridan Whiteside.

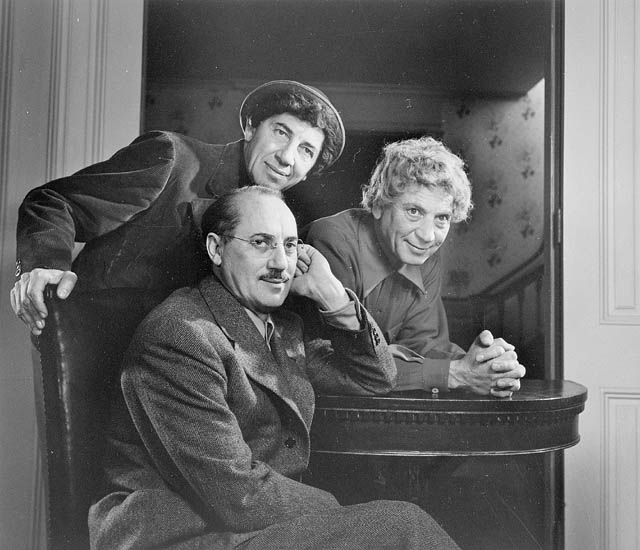
The Marx Brothers (clockwise: Chico, Harpo, and Groucho) by Yousuf Karsh in 1948

In 1961, Harpo published his autobiography, Harpo Speaks! Because he did not speak in any of his film appearances, many moviegoers believed he actually was mute. In fact, recordings of his voice on radio and TV can be found on the Internet, in documentaries, on bonus materials of Marx Brothers DVDs,, and on a 1964 recording of a Riverside Symphony Concert in which he narrates Peter and the Wolf. A reporter who interviewed him in the early 1930s wrote that Harpo "had a deep and distinguished voice, like a professional announcer", and like his brothers, spoke with a New York accent his entire life. According to those who personally knew him, Harpo's voice was much deeper than Groucho's, but it also sounded very similar to Chico's. His son, Bill, recalled that in private, Harpo had a very deep and mature soft-spoken voice, but that he was "not verbose" like the other Marx brothers, instead preferring to listen and learn from others.

Harpo expressed public support for Zionism and Israel since the 1940s. He often appeared as a speaker at pro-Israel functions throughout the country. He visited Israel in 1963.

Harpo's final public appearance came on January 19, 1963, when he announced his retirement, causing singer/comedian Allan Sherman to burst into tears. Comedian Steve Allen, who was in the audience, remembered that Harpo spoke for several minutes about his career, and how he would miss it all, and repeatedly interrupted Sherman when he tried to speak. Allen remembered that although the audience found this rare speech from Harpo charmingly ironic, his personal opinion was that Harpo "wouldn't shut up!" Harpo, an avid croquet player, was inducted into the Croquet Hall of Fame in 1979.

== Death ==
On September 26, 1964, Marx was admitted to the intensive care unit of West Los Angeles Veterans Affairs Medical Center in Los Angeles for a heart operation.

Marx died in the hospital after surgery on September 28, 1964, aged 75. Harpo's death was said to have hit the surviving Marx brothers very hard. Groucho's son Arthur Marx, who attended the funeral with most of the Marx family, later said that Harpo's funeral was the only time in his life that he ever saw his father cry. In his will, Harpo Marx donated his trademark harp to the State of Israel, where it was later used in an Israeli orchestra. His remains were cremated at the Hollywood Forever Cemetery and a portion of his ashes were allegedly scattered in the sand trap at the 7th hole of a golf course in Rancho Mirage, California.

== Legacy ==
Harpo's trademark outfit consisted of a trench coat with over-large pockets, red wig (he switched to a blond one for every film after The Cocoanuts because the red wig photographed dark in black-and-white), top hat, the comical horn heard in his movies, and his ever-present harp. In time, his talent earned him an international reputation as he performed in films as well as in stage shows around the globe. His talent extended to piano and clarinet (on which he played When My Dreams Come True in The Cocoanuts), which, as he had with the harp, Harpo mostly learned independent of professional instruction. Marx's son Bill went on to display his own musical abilities, performing his own compositions on piano live in concert alongside harpist Carrol McLaughlin. In 2002, a Golden Palm Star on the Palm Springs, California, Walk of Stars, located at 190 E. Tahquitz Way, was dedicated to Harpo's memory.

=== Media portrayals ===
Marx was portrayed by the actor J. M. Henry in the 1994 film Mrs. Parker and the Vicious Circle.

Marx was portrayed by actor Daniel Fortus in the Broadway production of Minnie's Boys, a Broadway musical that ran for 64 performances at the Imperial Theatre from March to May 1970. The show focused on the early days of the Marx Brothers' act and the importance of their mother Minnie's strong hand in guiding and molding them into a successful vaudeville and film comedy team.

Actress Priscilla Lopez played Gino, a character based on Harpo, in 1980's Broadway send-up of Hollywood filmmaking A Day in Hollywood/A Night in the Ukraine. This role earned Lopez a Tony Award for Best Performance by a Featured Actress in a Musical.

Les Marsden portrayed Harpo in Groucho: A Life in Revue, written by Groucho's son, Arthur Marx, and Robert Fisher. The play, held at the off-Broadway Lucille Lortel Theatre, boasted a 264 show run from September 8, 1986, to May 3, 1987.

=== References in other media ===
- Jack Kerouac composed a poem titled "To Harpo Marx".
- Jonathan Richman references Harpo in his song "When Harpo Played His Harp".
- Lemon Demon references Harpo Marx in the song "Vow of Silence".
- Phoebe Snow's "Harpo's Blues" (1975) was written about "a guy in a band who 'became' Harpo Marx ... he wouldn't talk, and his eyes would roll around ... ".
- Harpo appears in Thomas Pynchon's 2013 novel Bleeding Edge in a fictional, "never-distributed Marx Brothers version of Don Giovanni."

== Filmography ==
=== Film ===
Year	Title	Role	Notes
1921	Humor Risk	Watson	Short, lost
1925	Too Many Kisses	The Village Peter Pan	
1929	The Cocoanuts	Harpo	
1930	Animal Crackers	The Professor	
1931	The House That Shadows Built	The Merchant of Wieners	
1931	Monkey Business	Harpo	
1932	Hollywood on Parade, #A-5	Himself	Short
1932	Horse Feathers	Pinky	
1932	Hollywood on Parade, #11	Himself	Short
1933	Duck Soup	Pinky	
1935	A Night at the Opera	Tomasso	
1935	La Fiesta de Santa Barbara	Himself	Short
1937	A Day at the Races	Stuffy	
1938	Room Service	Faker Englund	
1939	At the Circus	'Punchy'	
1940	Go West	'Rusty' Panello	
1941	The Big Store	Wacky	
1943	Stage Door Canteen	Harpo Marx	
1945	All Star Bond Rally	Himself	
1946	A Night in Casablanca	Rusty	
1949	Love Happy	Harpo	
1957	The Story of Mankind	Sir Isaac Newton	
1962	Got It Made		lost

=== TV ===
Year	Title	Role	Notes
1952	The Ezio Pinza Show	Himself - Comic Actor	1 episode
1952–1953	All Star Revue	Himself	3 episodes
1953	Season's Greetings	Himself	TV movie
1954	The Colgate Comedy Hour	Governor	Episode: "Revenge with Music"
1955	I Love Lucy	Himself	Episode: "Harpo Marx"
1957	Playhouse 90	The Jinx	Episode: "Snowshoes: A Comedy of People and Horses"
1958	The DuPont Show of the Month	Narrator - Harpist	Episode: "The Red Mill"
1959	General Electric Theater	Nick	Episode: "The Incredible Jewel Robbery"
1960	The DuPont Show with June Allyson	Benson	Episode: "A Silent Panic"
1961	The DuPont Show of the Week	Himself	Episode: "The Wonderful World of Toys"
1962	The Red Skelton Hour	Guardian Angel	Episode: "Somebody Up There Should Stay There"
1962	Mr. Smith Goes to Washington	Himself	Episode: "The Musicale" (final appearance)

== Discography ==
- 1952 Harp by Harpo
- 1957 Harpo
- 1958 Harpo at Work!
- 1964 Mahalia Jackson - Let's Pray Together (harp accompanist on "Guardian Angels")
- 2026 (recorded 1964) Harpo Speaks! The Riverside Symphony Concert Featuring “Peter and the Wolf”

== Bibliography ==
- 1961 Harpo Speaks!
- 2000 Harpo Speaks ...About New York (the first two chapters of the above, repackaged)
