= Jerry Colonna (disambiguation) =

Jerry Colonna may refer to:

- Jerry Colonna (1904–1986), American comedy writer and performer
- Jerry Colonna (financier) (born 1963), New York City venture capitalist
