= Hollywood Daffy =

1946 film by Hawley Pratt

- Directed by: Hawley Pratt (uncredited)
- Story by: Michael Maltese
- Starring: Mel Blanc
- Music by: Carl W. Stalling
- Animation by: Ken Champin; Gerry Chiniquy; Manuel Perez; Virgil Ross
- Layouts by: Hawley Pratt
- Backgrounds by: Paul Julian
- Color process: Technicolor
- Production company: Warner Bros. Cartoons
- Distributed by: Warner Bros. Pictures
- Release date: June 22, 1946
- Running time: 7 minutes
- Language: English

Hollywood Daffy is a 1946 American animated comedy short film directed by Hawley Pratt. It stars Daffy Duck. The film was released on June 22, 1946.

The short was Pratt's directorial debut, as Friz Freleng refused to work on the short due to his dissatisfaction with the story.

== Plot ==
The film begins with a pack of wolves howling in the center of Hollywood (a reference to Hollywood and Vine) as a spot for men looking to pick up women ("wolves" in the slang of the day). Daffy, having travelled to Hollywood, attempts to get into the "Warmer Bros." studio to see movie stars. However, the abrasive Keystone Cops-like security guard with a Joe Besser-like voice will not let him pass through the gate. After unsuccessfully endeavoring to enter the studio by way of various disguises and being thrown out each time, culminating with Daffy posing as a film director, but ultimately this disguise is exposed as well. Daffy finally declares that he won't leave until he literally "sees (movie) stars." The guard agrees to figuratively show him the stars, then bashes Daffy over the head and throws him out of the studio, where the dazed Daffy can see all the stars he wants...circling his head.

== Voice Cast ==
- Mel Blanc as Daffy Duck / Studio Guard (imitation of Joe Besser) / Wolves / Johnny Weissmuller / Jimmy Durante / Jack Benny
  - Gil Turner as Daffy impersonating Bing Crosby (archival audio from Swooner Crooner)
- Sara Berner as Bette Davis (uncredited)

== Hollywood celebrities featured in the cartoon ==
- Daffy says he would love to meet Lauren Bacall.
- The cop allows Bette Davis (voiced by Sara Berner) and Johnny Weissmuller (swinging from a vine dressed as Tarzan) to enter the studio, because they're employees of the studio.
- When trying to enter the studio, Daffy disguises himself as Charlie Chaplin (in his signature outfit), Jimmy Durante, Bing Crosby (voiced by Gil Turner, whose imitation of Crosby is often used in numerous Looney Tunes cartoons) and an Academy Award statue. When the cop questions whether Daffy is really an Oscar, Daffy indicates that "J.L." is waiting for him, a reference to Jack L. Warner, head of production at Warner Brothers (see Freleng's "Ain't That Ducky" for another reference to "J.L." by Daffy.)
- When Daffy drives the cop through the studio, he passes the dressing rooms of Abbott and Costello (with the same shape as their bodies), Ann Sheridan (also as shapely as the actress, and surrounded by several bear traps) and Jimmy Durante (whose house has the same shape as his profile, including his famous, large nose), who has a bear trap on his leg.
- Jack Benny is seen trying to get an Oscar statue by playing a claw machine.
- Daffy compares the cop with Errol Flynn.
- When Daffy literally sees stars after being hit on the head, he claims that he recognizes Hedy Lamarr, Alexis Smith, Dorothy Lamour, Baby Snooks and Ann Sheridan.

== Home media ==
- VHS 1986 - Viddy-Oh! For Kids Cartoon Festivals: Daffy Duck Cartoon Festival Featuring "Ain't That Ducky" - MGM/UA Home Video
- VHS 1988 - Cartoon Moviestars: Just Plain Daffy - MGM/UA Home Video
- Laserdisc 1991 - The Golden Age of Looney Tunes: Volume 1 - MGM/UA Home Video
- VHS 1992 - The Golden Age of Looney Tunes: Vol. 9 - Hooray for Hollywood - MGM/UA Home Video
- DVD 2007 - Looney Tunes Golden Collection: Volume 5 (restored) - Warner Home Video
- DVD 2007 - Looney Tunes Spotlight Collection: Volume 5 (restored) - Warner Home Video
- DVD 2008 - All This and Heaven Too (extra, unrestored) - Warner Home Video
- Blu-Ray 2026 - Looney Tunes Collector's Vault: Volume 3 (restored) - Warner Archive Collection

== See also ==
- Daffy Duck filmography
- Looney Tunes and Merrie Melodies filmography (1940–1949)
