= The Autograph Hound =

1939 Donald Duck cartoon

- Theatrical release poster
- Directed by: Jack King
- Story by: Carl Barks
- Produced by: Walt Disney
- Starring: Clarence Nash; Billy Bletcher; Sara Berner; Peter Lind Hayes; Barbara Jean Wong; Lou Merrill; Donald Barry
- Music by: Oliver Wallace
- Animation by: Johnny Cannon; John Elliotte; Osmond Evans; Judge Whitaker; Larry Clemmons; Ray Patin; Dunbar Roman; Ed Love; Andy Engman; John Dunn; Ward Kimball; Nick DeTolly; Paul Allen; Rex Cox; Ken Peterson; Robert Stokes; Claude Smith; Lee Morehouse; Emery Hawkins; Kenneth Muse
- Color process: Technicolor
- Production company: Walt Disney Productions
- Distributed by: RKO Radio Pictures
- Release date: September 1, 1939
- Running time: 7:55
- Country: United States
- Language: English

The Autograph Hound is a 1939 Donald Duck cartoon which features Donald as an autograph hunter in Hollywood. Many celebrities from the 1930s are featured. This is the first cartoon where Donald Duck is featured in his blue sailor hat.

== Plot ==
Donald Duck tries to enter a Hollywood studio so he can search for celebrities willing to sign their autograph. A security guard with an Irish accent at the gate prevents him from entering the building. Donald manages to sneak inside by climbing on the limousine with Greta Garbo so that it seems he's riding along with her. The security guard discovers he's been fooled and chases Donald, who enters a room with the name "Mickey Rooney" on it. Inside, Mickey Rooney is dressing up in front of the mirror, when Donald asks him for his autograph.

Rooney writes his name in Donald's book and makes it disappear and reappear with a magic trick. Donald, who is not amused, tries to impress Rooney by doing a similar trick with an egg. However, the egg is obviously hidden under Donald's hat and Rooney, who is aware of this, crushes it, laughing loudly. Donald gets extremely angry and starts waving his fists, while Rooney manages to put a violin in Donald's hands and starts dancing an Irish jig Donald is playing. When Donald discovers he has been tricked for the third time, he throws the violin at Rooney. Rooney ducks and the instrument lands in the face of the security guard.

Alarmed, Donald runs away and hides under a bell-jar carried by actor Henry Armetta. When the security guard discovers Donald's hiding place, the duck runs to another film set full of ice. There, he meets Sonja Henie and asks her for an autograph. Henie signs her name by skating it in the ice, so that Donald has to carry it with him. While walking in a desert setting, Donald discovers the ice has melted. He notices a tent with the silhouettes of three belly dancing Arabic women, who turn out to be the Ritz Brothers. Excited, he asks them for their autographs, but behaving like screwballs, they jump on Donald and sign their group name on his buttocks. An enraged Donald throws a paint can at their heads, but it hits the face of the security guard instead.

Again, Donald has to flee, and he runs to a castle with the sign "The Road To Mandalay", which turns out to be just a canvas. After bumping his head into it and realizing his mistake, he runs into another direction. On a pair of stairs, he bumps into Shirley Temple. She, too, recognizes him and asks for an autograph. They both sit down to sign each other their autographs and Donald, excited he has his first real autograph, jumps in the air with joy. Then suddenly, the security guard finally grabs him and intends to beat him with his nightstick. Shirley tells him to leave Donald alone and he drops him on the floor in surprise: "Donald Duck? Did you say "Donald Duck"?"

Other Hollywood actors hear his comment and enthusiastically rush to Donald to ask him to sign his autograph for them (in chronological order: Greta Garbo, Clark Gable, The Andrews Sisters, Charlie McCarthy, Stepin Fetchit, Roland Young, the Lone Ranger riding his horse Silver, Joe E. Brown, Martha Raye, Hugh Herbert, Irvin S. Cobb, Edward Arnold, Katharine Hepburn, Eddie Cantor, Slim Summerville, Lionel Barrymore, Bette Davis, Groucho Marx, Harpo Marx, Mischa Auer, Joan Crawford, and Charles Boyer). When the police officer asks Donald to sign his autograph book and offers him his pen, Donald squirts ink in the policeman's face. While the ink drips from the security guard's face and Donald writes his name on the officer's chest, Donald laughs hysterically.

== Voice cast ==
- Donald Duck: Clarence Nash
- Security Guard: Billy Bletcher
- Charles Laughton, Charlie McCarthy, Clark Gable, Edward G. Robinson, Groucho Marx, Hugh Herbert, Joe E. Brown, John Barrymore, Lionel Barrymore, Ronald Colman: Peter Lind Hayes
- Greta Garbo, Joan Crawford, Katharine Hepburn, Martha Raye: Sara Berner
- Shirley Temple: Barbara Jean Wong
- Henry Armetta: Lou Merrill
- Mickey Rooney: Donald Barry
- Sonia Henie: herself

== Home media ==
The short was released on May 18, 2004 on Walt Disney Treasures: The Chronological Donald, Volume One: 1934-1941.
