= Mickey's Gala Premier =

1933 film by Burt Gillett

- Directed by: Burt Gillett
- Produced by: Walt Disney
- Music by: Frank Churchill
- Color process: Black-and-white
- Production company: Walt Disney Productions
- Distributed by: United Artists
- Release date: July 1, 1933
- Running time: 7 min
- Country: United States
- Language: English

Mickey's Gala Premier is a 1933 American animated comedy short film directed by Burt Gillett. It features caricatures of several famous Hollywood film actors from the 1930s, which other studios would adopt as a trope throughout the 1930s and 1940s. It is the 58th film of the Mickey Mouse series.

== Plot ==
A new Mickey Mouse cartoon is having its premiere in the Grauman's Chinese Theatre in Hollywood. Several Hollywood celebrities all arrive in limousines to attend this special event. Outside The Keystone Cops (Ben Turpin, Ford Sterling, Mack Swain, Harry Langdon, and Chester Conklin) are guarding the traffic.

Wallace Beery, Marie Dressler, Lionel Barrymore, John Barrymore and Ethel Barrymore step out of the first limousine, all costumed as in the film Rasputin and the Empress (1932). Then Laurel and Hardy leave the car and close the door behind them. Inside The Marx Brothers all stick their heads out of the car window.

In the next scene Maurice Chevalier, Eddie Cantor costumed as in the film The Kid from Spain, and Jimmy Durante take turns singing in front of a microphone. They are followed by Jean Harlow, Joan Crawford costumed as in the film Rain and Janet Gaynor all singing new lyrics to the chant. Finally Harold Lloyd, Clark Gable, Edward G. Robinson, and Adolphe Menjou join in to conclude the song.

Sid Grauman is saluting all the guests. George Arliss and Joe E. Brown simply enter, but Charlie Chaplin sneaks inside. Then Buster Keaton enters the building, followed by The Marx Brothers all hidden under Groucho Marx' coat. Mae West enters, costumed as in the film She Done Him Wrong, and utters her famous line, "Why don't you come up sometime and see me?", which shocks and embarrasses Grauman.

Then Mickey Mouse, Minnie Mouse, Pluto, Horace Horsecollar, and Clarabelle Cow arrive in a limousine and are cheered by the audience. Once inside the theatre Mickey's new cartoon, Gallopin' Romance, premieres. The plot revolves around Mickey and Minnie playing music together, when suddenly Pegleg Pete kidnaps Minnie and drives off on a horse (Horace Horsecollar). Mickey chases him and beats Pete in the end, bringing Minnie to safety.

All the guests in the theatre move rhythmically to the music. We can see Helen Hayes, William Powell, Chester Morris, Gloria Swanson, and George Arliss in the audience. In the next close-up scenes, the viewer can identify Jimmy Durante, Wallace Beery, Marie Dressler, Rudy Vallee, Eddie Cantor, Joan Crawford, Will H. Hays (dressed as a king in reference to his position as "Censorship Czar") and Myrna Loy. Ed Wynn, Wheeler & Woolsey, Laurel & Hardy all laugh with the cartoon. Bela Lugosi (dressed as Count Dracula), Fredric March (dressed as Mr. Hyde) and Boris Karloff (dressed as Frankenstein's monster) do the same, but with spooky evil laughter. Joe E. Brown laughs so loud that his enormous mouth opens wide, while Buster Keaton keeps his poker face. Jimmy Durante and Douglas Fairbanks laugh so loud that they literally "roll in the aisles". They are joined in by Groucho Marx, Joe E. Brown, Charlie Chaplin, Harold Lloyd and Laurel and Hardy. As the cartoon ends, the whole audience applauds and congratulates Mickey with his success, but Mickey is so shy that he has to be pulled on the stage by Will Rogers with a rope. All the Hollywood actors now shake Mickey's hands, and humorously, his feet, to congratulate him with his success. Then Greta Garbo, no longer wanting to be alone, walks onto the stage and starts covering Mickey's face with kisses. Mickey then wakes up in his bed, while Pluto is licking his face. Mickey wonders if he was dreaming, and then the scene irises out.

Other Hollywood celebrities that can be spotted in the crowd scenes: Constance Bennett, Warner Baxter, and Walt Disney (as the fourth person on the right, in the scene where the other actors shy away because Garbo enters the stage).

== Production notes ==
- The cartoon seen in the film, Gallopin' Romance, was made exclusively for Mickey's Gala Premier. No separate Mickey Mouse cartoon features this title.
- Ed Wynn would later play The Mad Hatter in the 1951 film Alice in Wonderland and Uncle Albert in Mary Poppins. Maurice Chevalier would later play Father Sylvain in Monkeys, Go Home! and sing the theme song of The Aristocats. Both would go on to be named a Disney Legend, an award given to those who have made an outstanding contribution to The Walt Disney Company.
- Adolphe Menjou would make his last film performance in the 1960 film Pollyanna.
- Helen Hayes would later play Grandma Steinmetz in Herbie Rides Again.
- This was the first time Mickey was depicted interacting with humans.
- At this point in time, the Mickey shorts were released through United Artists, but the only currently existing prints of this short are reissue prints that omit any mention of UA. However, the "titles" for the short-within-a-short Gallopin' Romance shows the UA credits, giving a modern-day viewer an idea on how a Mickey Mouse cartoon opening might have looked like in the UA era.

== Temporary shutdown of BBC Television Service ==
On September 1, 1939, Mickey's Gala Premier was the final programme broadcast by the BBC Television Service (today known as BBC One) before it ceased broadcasting during World War II.

An urban legend about this final broadcast claims that due to the sudden outbreak of the war the BBC cut the transmission mid-programme and continued it at the very point it had been interrupted when it resumed broadcasting after the war. Despite this widespread belief, the cartoon was shown in its entirety and then followed by tuning signals before the transmitter was shut down. On June 7, 1946, the day BBC television broadcasts resumed after the war, Mickey's Gala Premier was shown again.

== Voice cast ==
- Mickey Mouse: Walt Disney
- Minnie Mouse: Marcellite Garner
- Pluto: Pinto Colvig
- Pete: Billy Bletcher
- Celebrities: Jerry Lester

== Home media ==
The short was released on December 2, 2002, on Walt Disney Treasures: Mickey Mouse in Black and White.

== See also ==
- Mickey Mouse (film series)
