= ToonHeads =

American animation anthology series (1992–2003)

- Narrated by: George A. Klein (1992–95); Don Kennedy (1995–98); Leslie Fram (1998–2003)
- Country of origin: United States
- Original language: English
- No. of seasons: 8
- No. of episodes: 102

Production
- Producers: Andy Merrill; George A. Klein
- Running time: 15–60 minutes
- Production company: Cartoon Network Productions

Original release
- Network: Cartoon Network
- Release: October 2, 1992 – November 23, 2003

ToonHeads is an American animation anthology series consisting of Hanna-Barbera, Metro-Goldwyn-Mayer, Warner Bros., and Popeye cartoon shorts, with background information and trivia, prominently about animators and voice actors of the shorts. ToonHeads was originally broadcast on Cartoon Network from October 2, 1992, until November 23, 2003.

The series was first announced on the Cartoon Network Special "Droopy's Guide to the Cartoon Network" as part of a promotion advertising the various blocks that would appear on the channel and what order they would be shown in. This special was the first broadcast on the Cartoon Network's launch on October 1, 1992, and was re-aired throughout October 1992. The series includes more than 102 episodes (many undocumented), when including five specials: four one-hour specials and one half-hour special, two of which ("The Best of the Worst Cartoons Ever" and "The Twelve Missing Hares") were never aired but were uploaded to YouTube years later.

== Format ==
Early seasons feature an announcer stating each episode's theme and three cartoons to be showcased. Then the show underwent two format changes. The first happened in late 1995 when Don Kennedy was added as the narrator and would tell the history and facts of each cartoon shown (Don Kennedy would also have narration duties on The Tex Avery Show around that same time).

The second format change came in 1998 when George A. Klein took over as producer and writer of the show. He wanted the show to be a "Ken Burns" type of weekly documentary on specific cartoon history. Creating specific "themed" episodes utilizing the Warner Bros. cartoons. Three basic concepts used for these episodes are directors (e.g. Chuck Jones and Friz Freleng), characters (e.g. "Evolution of Tweety" and "The Year Elmer Fudd Got Fat"), and themes. Episodes include themes like cartoons that lampooned Hollywood celebrities and movies; cartoons where the humor comes from a character trying to get some sleep and being interrupted; cartoons that make fun of sports; obscure and rare works from Warner Bros.; and a look at the allegations of plagiarism between The Cat Concerto and Rhapsody Rabbit. Trivia questions were also added about the related cartoons used in each episode's theme. From 1998 to 2003, Leslie Fram did the narration for each episode's final tracks and George A. Klein narrated the rough-cut scratch tracks.

== Episodes ==
ToonHeads is notable for showing cartoons that were rarely seen on television, such as on "The Wartime Cartoons" special, "The Lost Cartoons" special, and one series of episodes in January 1996 featuring the long-unseen Nudnik shorts. There was also a special that aired on October 20, 1996, titled "A Night of Independent Animation", which featured independent student films, such as Another Bad Day for Philip Jenkins by Mo Willems, and The Wire by Aaron Augenblick.

In August 2022, the two unaired episodes "The Best of the Worst Cartoons Ever" and "The Twelve Missing Hares" were found. These episodes were preserved on tape by episode writer Jerry Beck and transferred through media loan by Jerico Dvorak who made them available.

=== Season 1 (1992–94) ===
No.	Title	Original release date
1	"El Kabong"	October 2, 1992
Cartoons about Hanna-Barbera character Quick Draw McGraw and his alter ego, El Kabong. Shorts featured include: El Kabong, El Kabong Meets El Kazing, and El Kabong Bongs Kabong.
2	"Barney Bear"	October 9, 1992
Cartoons about MGM character Barney Bear. Shorts featured include: Wee-Willie Wildcat, The Impossible Possum, and The Bear and the Beavers.
3	"Tom and Jerry: The Chuck Jones Cartoons"	October 16, 1992
Tom and Jerry cartoons made under Chuck Jones's direction in the 1960s. Shorts featured include: The Cat Above and the Mouse Below, Much Ado About Mousing, and Cat and Dupli-cat.
4	"Ranger John Smith"	October 23, 1992
Yogi Bear cartoons featuring Yogi's antagonist, Ranger Smith. Shorts featured include: A Bear Living, Bearface Disguise, and Home Sweet Jellystone.
5	"Hollywood"	October 30, 1992
Cartoons centered on Hollywood and the celebrities of the era. Shorts featured include: Slick Hare, Popeye's 20th Anniversary, and Yankee Doodle Daffy.
6	"The Old West"	November 6, 1992
Cartoons that parody Westerns. Shorts featured include: Hare Trigger, Homesteader Droopy, and Wagon Heels.
7	"Music"	November 13, 1992
Cartoons that heavily feature music. Shorts featured include: Me Musical Nephews, Rabbit of Seville, and Johann Mouse.
8	"Sports"	November 20, 1992
Cartoons in which most of the gags center on sports. Shorts featured include: Baseball Bugs, The Bowling Alley-Cat, and The Football Toucher Downer.
9	"Mel Blanc"	November 27, 1992
Cartoons featuring Mel Blanc's voice-acting range. Shorts featured include: Rabbit Seasoning, Speedy Gonzales, and Daffy Duck Slept Here.
10	"Daws Butler"	December 4, 1992
Cartoons featuring Daws Butler's voice-acting range. Shorts featured include: Mars Little Precious, Tricky Trappers, and Pie Pirates.
11	"The Evolution of Tom and Jerry"	December 11, 1992
Tom and Jerry cartoons as the years progressed. Shorts featured include: Puss Gets the Boot, Mouse Trouble, and Ah, Sweet Mouse-Story of Life.
12	"Bugs Bunny in Fairy Tales"	December 18, 1992
Fairy tale parodies featuring Bugs Bunny. Shorts featured include: Little Red Riding Rabbit, Bugs Bunny and the Three Bears, and Jack-Wabbit and the Beanstalk.
13	"Jay Ward"	December 25, 1992
Cartoons from Jay Ward Productions. Shorts featured include: Treasure of Sierra Madre, Tom Tom the Piper's Son, Dudley Do-Right, How to Direct Movies, and Snow White.
14	"The Best of Tex Avery"	January 1, 1993
Cartoons directed by Tex Avery.
15	"Academy Award Winning Toons"	January 8, 1993
Cartoons that won the Academy Award for Best Animated Short Film.
16	"Cartoon Sequels"	January 15, 1993
Cartoons that are sequels to other cartoons.
17	"Popeye"	January 22, 1993
Cartoons featuring the character Popeye.
18	"Valentine's Day"	February 14, 1993
Romantic comedy cartoons. Shorts featured include: The Zoot Cat, The Stupid Cupid, and Little 'Tinker.
19	"St. Patrick's Day"	March 17, 1993
Cartoons featuring leprechauns and Irish caricatures. Shorts featured include: The Huck of the Irish, Droopy Leprechaun, and The Wearing of the Grin.
20	"Wobert Cwampett: That Cwazy Diwector"	June 18, 1993
Cartoons directed by Bob Clampett.
21	"Don't Adjust Your Color: Black-and-White Cartoons"	June 25, 1993
Black-and-white cartoons from the 1930s and early 1940s.
22	"Insomnia"	August 20, 1993
Cartoons featuring characters with insomnia.
23	"Forgotten Directors: Frank Tashlin"	April 15, 1994
Cartoons directed by Frank Tashlin.
24	"Forgotten Directors: Arthur Davis"	April 29, 1994
Cartoons directed by Arthur Davis.

=== Season 2 (1996) ===
No.	Title	Original release date
25	"The Nudnik Shorts, Part 1"	January 8, 1996
The first cartoon lineup of the Nudnik franchise.
26	"The Nudnik Shorts, Part 2"	January 9, 1996
The second cartoon lineup of the Nudnik franchise.
27	"The Nudnik Shorts, Part 3"	January 10, 1996
The third cartoon lineup of the Nudnik franchise.
28	"The Nudnik Shorts, Part 4"	January 11, 1996
The fourth cartoon lineup of the Nudnik franchise.
29	"The Nudnik Shorts, Part 5"	January 12, 1996
The fifth and final cartoon lineup of the Nudnik franchise.
30	"A Night of Independent Animation"	October 20, 1996
Cartoons made by independent studios.
31	"Gossamer"	December 16, 1996
Cartoons featuring Chuck Jones's monster character Gossamer.
32	"Blame It on the Stork!"	December 23, 1996
Cartoons about delivery storks and babies.
33	"The Economy According to Sylvester"	December 30, 1996
Cartoons featuring Sylvester the Cat.

=== Season 3 (1998–99) ===
No.	Title	Original release date
34	"Travelogue Cartoons"	November 13, 1998
Cartoons that parodied the travelogue, a short film that advertised the beauty and splendor of a certain country or region. Shorts featured include: Detouring America (edited for content), Crazy Cruise (edited for content), and Fresh Fish, with clips from The Isle of Pingo Pongo, The Heckling Hare, Falling Hare, and Goofy Gophers.
35	"Emily the Chicken"	November 20, 1998
Cartoons centered on Emily the Chicken, an obscure 1930s hen character who would later be redesigned as Miss Prissy in the Foghorn Leghorn cartoons. Shorts featured include: Let It Be Me, A Star Is Hatched, and Strangled Eggs.
36	"Baseball Cartoons"	November 27, 1998
Cartoons that spoofed everything about the Great American pastime. Shorts featured include: Gone Batty, Batty Baseball, and Baseball Bugs.
37	"The Early Works of Chuck Jones"	December 4, 1998
A look at the Disney-esque Warner Bros. shorts Chuck Jones created when he first started as a director. Shorts featured include: The Night Watchman, Dog Gone Modern, and Toy Trouble (edited for content).
38	"Southern Fried Cartoons"	December 11, 1998
Cartoons that take place in the American South. Shorts featured include Southern Fried Rabbit (edited for content, though the scene of Bugs dressed as Abraham Lincoln chastising Sam for whipping slaves was partially shown during the first host segment), Backwoods Bunny, and The Dixie Fryer, with clips from the live-action movie Gone with the Wind and MGM's animated short Red Hot Riding Hood.
39	"Midnight in the Bookstore"	December 18, 1998
Cartoons showing book characters coming to life during closing time. Shorts featured include: Speaking of the Weather (edited for content), You're an Education (replaced in reruns with a redrawn-colorized, edited-for-content version of I Like Mountain Music), and Book Revue (edited for content), with clips from Smile, Darn Ya, Smile!
40	"The Many Faces of Robin Hood"	December 25, 1998
Cartoons that spoofed the legend (and many film adaptations) of Robin Hood. Shorts featured include: Robin Hood Makes Good, Robin Hood Daffy, and Robin Hoodwinked.
41	"Hollywood Nights"	January 1, 1999
Cartoons that featured Hollywood celebrities of the 1930s and '40s. Shorts featured include: The CooCoo Nut Grove, Hollywood Steps Out, and Slick Hare.
42	"Future Shock"	January 8, 1999
Cartoons that parodied the 1940s and 1950s imaginings of what the future would be like. Shorts featured include: Dog Gone Modern, House Hunting Mice, and The House of Tomorrow.
43	"Movie Star Bugs"	January 15, 1999
A look at how Bugs Bunny has gained movie star status in the history of American film. Unlike most regular ToonHeads episodes, this one only has two featured shorts: A Hare Grows in Manhattan and What's Up Doc?, followed by several clips from past Bugs Bunny cartoons.
44	"Shut Eye"	January 22, 1999
Cartoons centered on the comedy behind a character trying to get some sleep. Sketches featured include: Good Night Elmer, Back Alley Oproar, and Daffy Duck Slept Here.
45	"Egghead"	January 29, 1999
Cartoons featuring Egghead, a comic character said to be the precursor to Elmer Fudd. Shorts featured include: Daffy Duck & Egghead (edited for content), Count Me Out, and A Day at the Zoo (edited for content).
46	"The Dreams of Bob Clampett"	February 5, 1999
A look at Bob Clampett's most surreal color cartoons. Shorts featured include: The Old Grey Hare (with end card that does not shake from the off-screen explosion), The Great Piggy Bank Robbery, and The Big Snooze (edited for content, though it would later be uncut on The Bob Clampett Show).

=== Season 4 (1999) ===
No.	Title	Original release date
47	"The Goofy Gophers"	May 14, 1999
Cartoons featuring Mac and Tosh, a pair of overly-polite, yet extremely mischievous gophers. Shorts featured include: Goofy Gophers, I Gopher You, and Tease for Two, with clips from Two Gophers from Texas, A Bone for a Bone, Back Alley Oproar, The Wacky Wabbit, Gopher Broke, Lumber Jerks, and Daffy Duck and Egghead.
48 (47.3)	"Motor Heads"	May 21, 1999
Cartoons starring anthropomorphic cars and planes. Shorts featured include: Streamlined Greta Green, One Cab's Family, and Little Johnny Jet.
49 (47.5)	"Fight Night"	May 28, 1999
Cartoons that lampooned boxing. Shorts featured include: Let's You and Him Fight (redrawn colorized version), To Duck or Not to Duck, and Rabbit Punch, with clips from Baseball Bugs, and Count Me Out.
50	"The Evolution of Tweety"	June 6, 1999
Cartoons chronicling how Tweety Bird's appearance and personality have changed since his debut cartoon. Shorts featured include A Tale of Two Kitties, Tweetie Pie, and Canary Row, with clips from the live-action movie Citizen Kane and the animated shorts Papa Gets the Bird, The Cagey Canary, Birdy and the Beast, A Gruesome Twosome, and Home Tweet Home.
51	"The Year Elmer Fudd Got Fat"	June 13, 1999
A look at the short-lived time in the early 1940s when Elmer Fudd was depicted as a fat man to look more like his voice actor, Arthur Q. Bryan. Shorts featured include: Wabbit Twouble, The Wacky Wabbit, and Fresh Hare (edited for content), with clips from A Wild Hare, Good Night, Elmer, To Duck or Not to Duck, A Star Is Bored, and The Wabbit Who Came to Supper.
52	"The Nice Mice of Warner Bros."	June 20, 1999
Animated shorts from Warner Bros. Cartoons featuring mice that sang and danced. Shorts featured include: Ain't We Got Fun, A Sunbonnet Blue, and The Mice Will Play.
53	"Toro! Toro!"	June 27, 1999
Cartoons that lampooned bull-fighting. Shorts include: Bulldozing the Bull (redrawn colorized), Bully for Bugs, and Senor Droopy, with clips from Mexican Joyride.
54	"Director Robert McKimson"	July 4, 1999
Cartoons directed by one of Warner Bros. Cartoons' longest-running animation directors, Robert McKimson. Shorts featured include: Daffy Doodles, Easter Yeggs, and Walky Talky Hawky.
55	"Our Man Sam"	July 11, 1999
A look at Yosemite Sam, Friz Freleng's hot-tempered, trigger-happy cowboy character created as a more worthy adversary to Bugs Bunny. Shorts featured include: Hare Trigger, Along Came Daffy, and Bugs Bunny Rides Again (with the reissued line, "...and I ain't no namby-pamby" instead of the original line "...and I don't mean Mahatma Gandhi" in Yosemite Sam's introduction boast).
56	"The Musical Cartoons of Friz Freleng"	July 18, 1999
Cartoons directed by Friz Freleng that showcase his ability to mix music with comedy. Shorts featured include: Rhapsody in Rivets, Lights Fantastic (edited for content), and Rhapsody Rabbit.
57	"Night of 1000 Elves"	July 25, 1999
A look at cartoons that featured elven characters, often in a parody of the fable "The Shoemaker and the Elves". Shorts featured include: Busy Bakers, Holiday for Shoestrings (edited for content), and The Peachy Cobbler.
58 (54.91)	"One Toon Wonders"	August 1, 1999
A look at cartoons featuring characters who only starred in one cartoon, but were still considered memorable in some capacity. Shorts featured include: Ghost Wanted (edited for content), The Crackpot Quail (reissued "whistle" version), and One Froggy Evening, with clips from Peck Up Your Troubles and Buckaroo Bugs.
59	"Battle of the Bookworms"	August 8, 1999
A look at how both Warner Bros. and MGM created cartoons featuring green, bespectacled worm characters who go on adventures in libraries and bookstores at closing time. Shorts featured include: The Bookworm, Sniffles and the Bookworm, and The Wacky Worm, with clips from Busy Bakers, Hollywood Steps Out, Greetings Bait, Daffy Doodles, and Detouring America.

=== Season 5 (1999–2001) ===
No.	Title	Original release date
60	"Crooner Toons"	November 19, 1999
Cartoons that had caricatures of crooners, male singers of the 1930s and '40s. Shorts featured include: Bingo Crosbyana, I Only Have Eyes for You, and Swooner Crooner (edited for content, though the Al Jolson rooster auditioning with "September in the Rain" -- a scene often cut on most American TV channels, including Cartoon Network -- was shown in two clip montages during the "ToonHeads Trivia" segments), with clips from Book Revue, The CooCoo Nut Grove, and I Love to Singa.
61	"Turkey Toons"	November 26, 1999
Cartoons featuring the turkey as a character, often being hunted by Pilgrims as part of the first Thanksgiving. Shorts featured include: Tom Turkey and His Harmonica Humdingers, Jerky Turkey (edited for content), and Tom Turk and Daffy, with clips from Along Came Daffy, Pilgrim Popeye, and The Little Orphan.
62	"Hobo Flea"	December 3, 1999
Cartoons featuring the flea as a Great Depression-era hobo traveling from dog to dog to make a home for himself. Shorts featured include: The Homeless Flea, An Itch in Time (edited for content), and What Price Fleadom? (edited for content), with clips from Hobo Gadget Band.
63	"Rocky and Mugsy"	December 10, 1999
Cartoons featuring Rocky and Mugsy, two semi-recurring gangster characters. Shorts featured include: Bugs and Thugs, Bugsy and Mugsy, and The Unmentionables, with clips from Golden Yeggs, Catty Cornered, and Stooge for a Mouse.
64	"Salesman Daffy"	December 17, 1999
Cartoons that feature Daffy Duck as a relentless salesman. Shorts include: Yankee Doodle Daffy, The Stupor Salesman, and Fool Coverage, with clips from Along Came Daffy, Rabbit's Kin, and archive footage from the Leon Schlesinger Productions gag reel.
65	"A ToonHeads Cartoon Christmas Special"	December 24, 1999
Special one-hour episode of Christmas-themed cartoons. Shorts featured include: Alias St. Nick, The Captain's Christmas (edited for content), Peace on Earth, The Night Before Christmas, and Bedtime for Sniffles, with clips from One Ham's Family and The Midnight Snack.
66	"An Ant's Life"	December 26, 1999
Cartoons directed by Friz Freleng that parody the cliché of ants at a picnic, often depicting it as a war. Shorts featured include The Fighting 69th-½ (edited for content), The Gay Anties, and Ant Pasted, with clips from Chuck Jones' The Dover Boys.
67	"A ToonHeads Special: The Lost Cartoons"	March 12, 2000
A special episode featuring lost, rare, and obscure works from Warner Bros. studios. Featuring: Bosko, the Talk-Ink Kid (edited for time), Crying for the Carolines, clips from the Leon Schlesinger Productions gag reel showing a "typical" day working at Termite Terrace; Lady, Play Your Mandolin! (edited for time), Any Bonds Today? (edited for content), Spies (edited for content), The Return of Mr. Hook (edited for time), a scene from Two Guys from Texas, a scene from My Dream Is Yours, So Much for So Little, Drafty, Isn't It?, a commercial for Tang featuring Bugs Bunny and Marvin the Martian, clips from the failed 1950s pilot Philbert, and the opening credits and original theme song for Adventures of the Road Runner, with clips from You Ought to Be in Pictures, One Froggy Evening, Rabbit Seasoning, Daffy Duck in Hollywood, Slick Hare, What's Opera, Doc?, Tired and Feathered, Home Tweet Home, Baby Bottleneck, the Private Snafu shorts Going Home and Snafuperman, and Hare Trigger. This episode was subsequently released on the Looney Tunes Golden Collection: Volume 1 DVD and the Looney Tunes Platinum Collection: Volume 2 Blu-ray, complete with the cuts done on Cartoon Network.
68	"The Twelve Missing Hares"	Unaired
A June Bugs 2001 special focused around the 12 Bugs Bunny shorts that have been banned for depicting outdated racial and ethnic caricatures (though Fresh Hare has aired on Cartoon Network, albeit edited to remove the ending where Bugs, Elmer, and the Canadian Mountie firing squad are in blackface and singing "Camptown Races"), with announcer Leslie Fram explaining why these caricatures are considered offensive today. All of the cartoons featured are in clips; there are no full shorts. Clips from shorts featured are: Hiawatha's Rabbit Hunt, A Feather in His Hare, Horse Hare, What's Cookin' Doc?, Any Bonds Today?, All This and Rabbit Stew, Fresh Hare, Herr Meets Hare, Bugs Bunny Nips the Nips, Frigid Hare, Which Is Witch, Mississippi Hare, and Bushy Hare.
69	"A ToonHeads Special: The Wartime Cartoons"	July 1, 2001
A look at the Warner Bros., MGM, and Fleischer Studios cartoons that were made during World War II. Shorts featured include: Blitz Wolf (edited for content), Scrap Happy Daffy, Herr Meets Hare, Russian Rhapsody, and clips from Bugs Bunny Nips the Nips, Tokio Jokio, The Weakly Reporter, Seein' Red, White, and Blue, Spinach fer Britain, Daffy – The Commando, Crazy Cruise, and Any Bonds Today?.

=== Season 6 (2001) ===
No.	Title	Original release date
70	"The Evolution of Elmer Fudd"	November 4, 2001
Special one-hour episode showing how the big-nosed Joe Penner caricature named Egghead from Tex Avery's early Warner Bros. shorts became the bald, neurotic hunter known as Elmer Fudd. Shorts featured include: A-Lad-In Bagdad, Dangerous Dan McFoo, Elmer's Candid Camera, The Hardship of Miles Standish, and A Wild Hare (edited reissue version where Elmer's second guess during Bugs' "Guess Who?" game is "Barbara Stanwyck" instead of "Carole Lombard"), with clips from Rabbit Fire, Daffy Duck and Egghead, Count Me Out, Johnny Smith and Poker-Huntas, Hamateur Night, and A Feud There Was.
71	"The Early Works of Hanna-Barbera"	November 11, 2001
A look at the Disney-esque cartoons made by William Hanna and Joseph Barbera back when they worked at MGM Studios. Shorts featured include: To Spring, Puss Gets the Boot (version where Mammy Two-Shoes' voice is redubbed), Gallopin' Gals (edited for content), Officer Pooch, and Yankee Doodle Mouse (uncut version, despite most Cartoon Network installment shows at the time airing a version that cut the part where Tom appears as a blackfaced sunflower after sticking his head in a tea kettle with a firecracker in it).
72	"Moon Toons"	November 25, 2001
Cartoons centered on space travel years before it would become a reality. Shorts featured include: Little Buck Cheeser, The Cat That Hated People, and Haredevil Hare, with clips from Georges Méliès's A Trip to the Moon (La Voyage dans la Lune) and the Tex Avery short King-Size Canary.
73	"The Great Cartoon Controversy"	November 25, 2001
A look at the allegations of plagiarism between MGM's The Cat Concerto and Warner Bros.' Rhapsody Rabbit. Shorts include: The Cat Concerto, Rhapsody Rabbit, and Tweetie Pie.
74	"The Tasmanian Devil"	December 2, 2001
Cartoons featuring the Tasmanian Devil (nicknamed "Taz"), Robert McKimson's inarticulate, ravenous whirling dervish who served as one of Bugs Bunny's enemies and has become one of the most popular Looney Tunes characters, despite starring in only five cartoons during the mid-to-late 1950s into the early 1960s. Shorts featured include: Devil May Hare, Ducking the Devil, and Dr. Devil and Mr. Hare.
75	"Before Bedrock"	December 2, 2001
Cartoons that take place during the Stone Age (and were created before The Flintstones would make the Stone Age setting popular). Shorts featured include: Daffy Duck and the Dinosaur (edited for time), The First Bad Man (edited for content), and Wild Wild World.
76	"The Early Works of Friz Freleng"	December 9, 2001
A special one-hour episode centered on Friz Freleng's early Warner Bros. shorts. Shorts featured include: It's Got Me Again!, Beauty and the Beast, Mr. and Mrs. Is the Name, I Haven't Got a Hat, and A Star Is Hatched.
77	"A Night at the Opera"	December 16, 2001
A look at the three Chuck Jones-directed cartoons that spoofed opera. Shorts include: Long-Haired Hare, Rabbit of Seville, and What's Opera, Doc?.
78	"Sufferin' Succotash"	December 16, 2001
A look at the development of Sylvester the Cat and how Friz Freleng, Robert McKimson, and even Chuck Jones depicted him in their cartoons. Shorts featured include: Life with Feathers (edited for content), Crowing Pains, and Scaredy Cat (Blue Ribbon Merrie Melodie edited version where the scene of Sylvester threatening suicide is completely cut, as is Porky Pig nearly getting shot in the back of the head by one of the murderous mice).
79	"Beaky Buzzard"	December 23, 2001
Cartoons starring Beaky Buzzard, a dopey, bashful, awkward buzzard trying to bring back prey for his mother. Shorts featured include: Bugs Bunny Gets the Boid, The Bashful Buzzard, and Strife with Father.
80	"Baby Boom Toons"	December 23, 2001
Cartoons that feature and parody the myth of the stork bringing newborn babies to expecting parents and premiered during the early days of the post-WWII baby boom (1945-1964). Shorts featured include: The Stork's Holiday, Baby Bottleneck (edited for content, though the scene of the Jimmy Durante-sounding stork literally drinking himself under the table was shown as a clip during the host segments), and Stork Naked, with clips from Goo Goo Goliath, the Private Snafu short Going Home; and live-action clips from newsreels about the end of World War II and the start of the Baby Boom.
81	"Tish Tash"	December 30, 2001
A look at the animated works of Frank Tashlin during his off-and-on stint at Warner Bros. Cartoons. Shorts featured include: Porky's Poultry Plant, You're an Education, Puss n' Booty, Swooner Crooner (edited for content), and Nasty Quacks, with clips from Brother Brat, Porky Pig's Feat (computer-colorized version), Hare Remover, Have You Got Any Castles?, and A Corny Concerto.
82	"Cartoon Newsreels"	December 30, 2001
A look at cartoons that lampooned the newsreel, a short film shown before movies that highlighted world events. Shorts featured include: She Was an Acrobat's Daughter, the unreleased Private Snafu short Going Home, and The Hole Idea, with clips from Bacall to Arms, Nutty News, The Film Fan, Cell-Bound, and Stage Door Cartoon.

=== Season 7 (2002) ===
No.	Title	Original release date
83	"Ralph Phillips"	July 21, 2002
Cartoons centered on Ralph Phillips, Chuck Jones' microscopically short-lived boy character who always had vivid daydreams (though the last cartoon of the three shown is a Friz Freleng cartoon that has a boy named Junior who's meant to be a brattier version of Ralph Phillips). Shorts featured include: From A to Z-Z-Z-Z (edited for content), Boyhood Daze (edited for content), and A Waggily Tale.
84	"Rabbit Season, Duck Season"	July 28, 2002
A look at the "Hunter's Trilogy" (or "Rabbit Season, Duck Season") cartoons, where Daffy Duck and Bugs Bunny argue over what hunting season it is and everything Bugs does leads to Daffy getting shot by Elmer Fudd. Shorts featured include: Rabbit Fire, Rabbit Seasoning, and Duck! Rabbit, Duck!
85	"Hubie and Bertie"	August 4, 2002
A look at Chuck Jones' Hubie and Bertie, a duo of curious, smart-aleck mice who often play pranks on a neurotic cat named Claude. Shorts featured include: The Aristo-Cat, Mouse Wreckers, and Cheese Chasers.
86	"The Great Race"	August 11, 2002
Cartoons featuring car races and foot races and the comedy that ensues from them. Shorts featured include: Tortoise Beats Hare, Porky's Road Race (edited for content), Tortoise Wins by a Hare (edited for content), Porky's Naughty Nephew, and Rabbit Transit.
87	"Cartoons in the Real World"	August 18, 2002
A look at cartoons that blended live-action with animation. Shorts featured include: The Adventures of Popeye and You Ought to Be in Pictures, with clips from Bosko, the Talk-Ink Kid, Popeye the Sailor, and Betty Boop's Rise to Fame.
88	"Director Arthur Davis"	September 1, 2002
A look at Arthur Davis, an animator who, from 1946 to 1949 (and a brief return in 1962), directed a handful of Warner Bros. cartoons following the departures of Bob Clampett and Frank Tashlin. Shorts featured include: Mouse Menace, Bowery Bugs, and Quackodile Tears, with clips from Catch as Cats Can, Two Gophers from Texas, and Mexican Joyride.
89	"Before They Were Stars"	December 21, 2002
Cartoons featuring early versions of popular characters. Shorts include: A Tale of Two Kitties (showing an early version of Tweety Bird), Fast and Furry-ous (showing early versions of Road Runner and Wile E. Coyote), Stage Door Cartoon (showing an early version of Yosemite Sam), and clips from Cat-Tails for Two (showing an early version of Speedy Gonzales).
90	"Gangster Toons"	December 24, 2002
A look at cartoons that parodied gangster crime dramas. Shorts featured include: I'm a Big Shot Now, Thugs with Dirty Mugs, and Bunny and Claude (We Rob Carrot Patches), with clips from the live-action movies Strike Up the Band, Born to Dance, The Roaring Twenties, Little Caesar (title card and credits only), and Bonnie and Clyde (the 1967 live-action version) and the animated shorts Hollywood Steps Out, Racketeer Rabbit, and Slick Hare.
91	"The Movie Parodies of Porky and Daffy"	December 26, 2002
A look at a subgenre of Chuck Jones-directed cartoons that featured Daffy Duck and Porky Pig in film genre spoofs. Shorts featured include: the Western parody Drip-Along Daffy (edited for time), the sci-fi space adventure parody Duck Dodgers in the 24½th Century, and the Victorian-era mystery/Sherlock Holmes parody Deduce, You Say.
92	"The Three Faces of Tom and Jerry"	December 27, 2002
A look at how MGM's Tom and Jerry cartoons looked under the direction of William Hanna and Joseph Barbera (as seen in Mouse Trouble), Gene Deitch (as seen in High Steaks), and Chuck Jones (as seen in Purr-chance to Dream).
93	"Director Norman McCabe"	December 28, 2002
Special one-hour episode featuring cartoons directed by Norman McCabe, an animator with Bob Clampett who directed a handful of Warner Bros. shorts. Shorts featured include: Who's Who in the Zoo (computer-colorized and uncut), Daffy's Southern Exposure (computer-colorized), The Ducktators (original black and white and uncut), Gopher Goofy (original black and white), and Hop and Go (original black and white and uncut), with clips from Confusions of a Nutzy Spy (original black and white), Along Came Daffy, The Timid Toreador (original black and white), Porky's Snooze Reel (original black and white), The Daffy Duckaroo (computer-colorized), Hobby Horse-Laffs (original black and white), Tokio Jokio (original black and white; title card and credits only), Cats and Bruises (title card and credits only), an unidentified Pink Panther cartoon (title card and credits only), and a publicity still from Pinky and the Brain.
94	"Speedy Gonzales"	December 31, 2002
Cartoons featuring Speedy Gonzales, Robert McKimson's (later Friz Freleng's) Mexican mouse who uses his speed and cunning to trick Sylvester the Cat (and other enemies, though mostly, it was Sylvester the Cat) and save his friends from oppression and starvation. Shorts featured include: Cat-Tails for Two, Speedy Gonzales, and The Pied Piper of Guadalupe.

=== Season 8 (2003) ===
No.	Title	Original release date
95	"The Best of the Worst Cartoons Ever"	Unaired
A special centered around the worst Hanna-Barbera, Ruby-Spears, and Filmation cartoons ever made. Features clips from the various short-lived series that copied the characters and premise of Scooby-Doo, Where Are You?, failed Hanna-Barbera series from the 1970s, and the Filmation Tom and Jerry series. It also features the full episode of Disco Droopy as ToonHeads' top pick of "The Best of the Worst Cartoons Ever".
96	"Captain and the Kids"	October 19, 2003
A look at The Captain and the Kids, MGM's animated adaptation of The Katzenjammer Kids. Shorts include: Cleaning House, Poultry Pirates, Old Smokey, Petunia Natural Park, and Mama's New Hat.
97	"The Early Career of Porky Pig"	October 26, 2003
A look at the early 1930s cartoons starring Warner Bros. Cartoons' first true star character (after Rudolf Ising and Hugh Harman took Bosko over to MGM and Buddy wasn't warmly received), Porky Pig. Shorts include: Gold Diggers of '49, The Blow Out, Westward Whoa, Porky's Romance, and Porky's Duck Hunt.
98	"Private SNAFU"	November 9, 2003
Cartoons centered on Private Snafu, a comically incompetent Army private whose shorts were only seen by military audiences during World War II. Shorts featured include: Coming Snafu, Booby Traps, Spies (shown uncut, despite appearing edited on "ToonHeads: The Lost Cartoons"), Snafuperman, and Censored (edited for content).
99	"Tex's Red"	November 9, 2003
Cartoons featuring the sexy showgirl character (nicknamed "Red" by fans) who appeared in Tex Avery's MGM shorts. Shorts include: Red Hot Riding Hood, Wild and Woolfy, and Little Rural Riding Hood.
100	"The Many Moods of Daffy Duck"	November 16, 2003
Cartoons showing how Daffy Duck went from "wacky" to "vain and greedy". Shorts include: The Wise Quacking Duck (wacky Daffy), Duck Amuck (a mix of wacky, angry, and unlucky comic victim Daffy), and Ali Baba Bunny (greedy and vain Daffy).
101	"Pepé Le Pew"	November 16, 2003
Cartoons about Chuck Jones' amorous French skunk character, Pepé Le Pew. Shorts featured include: Odor-able Kitty, For Scent-imental Reasons, and Louvre Come Back to Me!, with clips from Wild Over You, The Cats Bah, Really Scent, Odor of the Day, Scent-imental Over You, Two Scent's Worth, Heaven Scent, Touché and Go, Who Scent You?, A Scent of the Matterhorn, Dog Pounded, Scent-imental Romeo, and Little Beau Pepé.
102	"The Boys from Kansas City"	November 23, 2003
A special one-hour episode (and series finale) showing how Ub Iwerks, Hugh Harman, Rudolf Ising, and Isadore "Friz" Freleng went from working with Walt Disney in Kansas City to moving to Hollywood, California and becoming legends in the animation industry. Shorts include: Smile, Darn Ya, Smile (redrawn colorized), Porky and Gabby, Porky's Hare Hunt, Bottles, and The Milky Way.

== See also ==
- List of programs broadcast by Cartoon Network
- Cartoon Alley
- The Tex Avery Show
- The Bob Clampett Show
- The Popeye Show
- Toon In with Me
