= Tokio Jokio =

1943 film by Norman McCabe

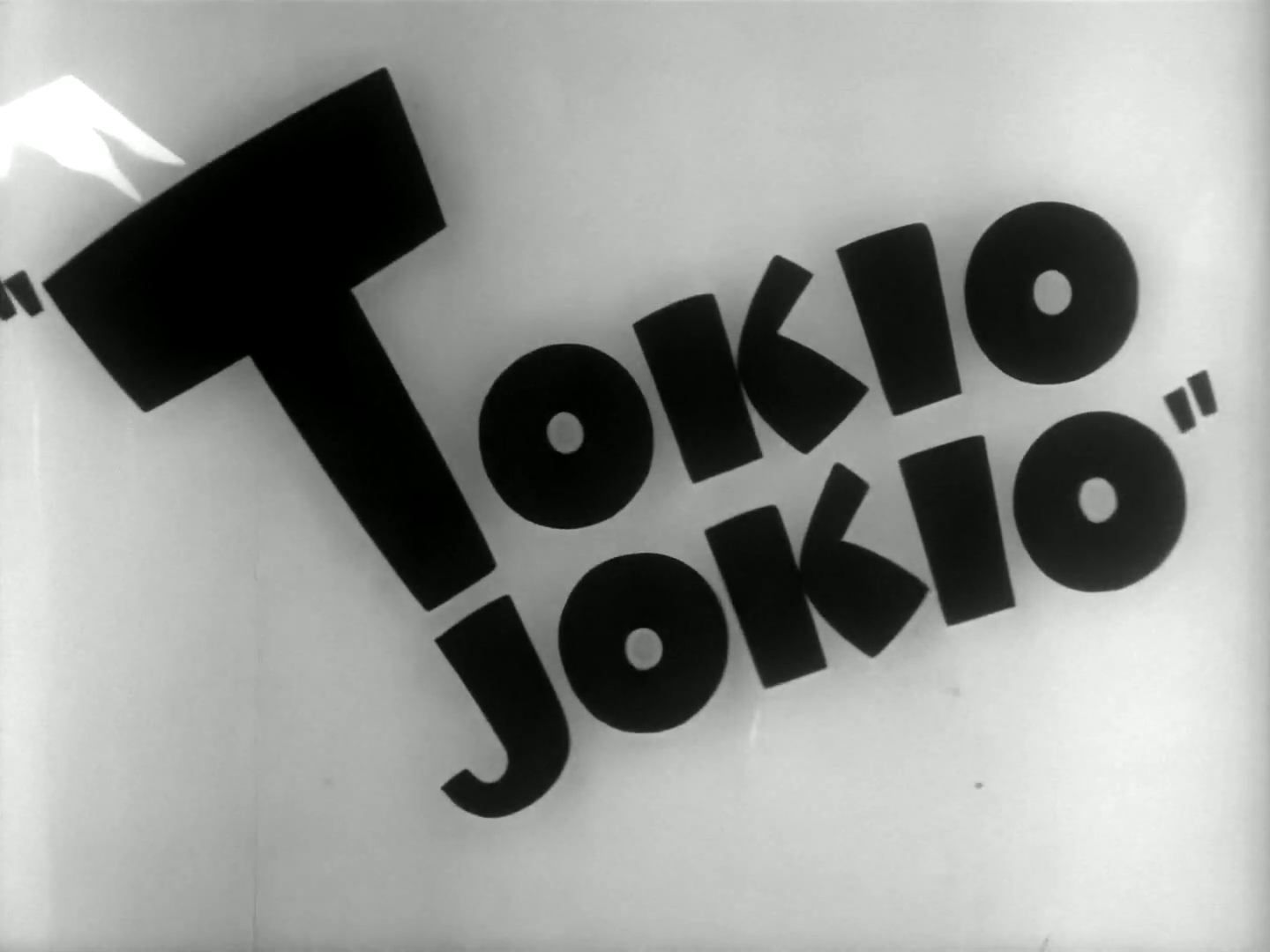
- Title card
- Directed by: Norman McCabe
- Story by: Don R. Christensen
- Produced by: Leon Schlesinger
- Starring: Mel Blanc
- Music by: Carl W. Stalling
- Animation by: Isadore Ellis
- Color process: Black and white
- Production company: Leon Schlesinger Productions
- Distributed by: Warner Bros. Pictures
- Release date: May 15, 1943
- Running time: 7 minutes
- Country: United States
- Language: English

Tokio Jokio is a 1943 American animated propaganda comedy short film directed by Norman McCabe. It is an example of American propaganda during World War II. The cartoon was withdrawn from public broadcast after the war for its racist depictions. It is part of the Looney Tunes series and the final to be directed by McCabe before he was drafted into the United States Army and replaced by returning director Frank Tashlin. He would not be involved with the franchise until he joined DePatie–Freleng Enterprises as an animator on Pancho's Hideaway.

The name of the cartoon is a pun on "Tokyo", the capital of Japan (Tokio is the old English romanization), "joke". Tokio Jokio is one of the 122 Warner Bros. animated shorts identified as having not had its copyright renewed in 1971 and is thus in the public domain in the United States. Widely panned for its offensive and dehumanizing depiction of the Japanese, Tokio Jokio was never released on home media in a similar manner to the Censored Eleven.

== Plot ==
Full short

The film pretends to be a newsreel from Japanese cinema that was captured by American troops during World War II. Each segment features a separate story supposedly praising Japanese life and the war effort. In reality, each segment contains often racist satirical content to depict the Japanese and their Axis allies as incompetent, pathetic, self-destructive failures.

The cartoon opens with an unseen narrator announcing that footage of Japan has been released to the public. The footage starts with a rooster that is a parody of Pathé with the opening of the Defile March playing in the background. The "rooster" attempts to crow, but it is revealed that it is actually a vulture in a costume. The vulture has glasses and buck teeth, and is seen rubbing its wings together and saying "Oh, cock-a-doodle-doo, prease", all stereotypical traits to show that the vulture is Japanese.

The first segment is "Civilian Defense", and the voiceover presents the Japanese air raid siren system. This "system" is two Japanese men who take turns poking each other's buttocks with a giant needle (a reference to the obscene Japanese gesture kancho) and screaming in pain. A listening post is also shown in the following scene, showing a small Japanese man walking around a pole covered in keyholes. There is also an "aircraft spotter", and another Japanese man is literally painting spots on a plane. The narrator turns to show the fire prevention headquarters, but it was already burned down.

"Incendiary Bombs" gives a lesson on bombs, with text stating that one should not approach them for the first five seconds. A small Japanese man with an umbrella walks onto the screen and reads the text, so he looks at his watch (the watch is covered with Hakenkreuzen) and counts for six seconds before cooking a sausage over the bomb with his umbrella. The bomb explodes and the man is blasted into a hole in the ground. The man, however, survives and climbs out of the hole, then makes a comment about losing face ("losing face, prease, losing face!") – having literally lost his face, despite his glasses and hat remaining in place.

In "Kitchen Hints", Hideki Tojo is shown as a cook. He gives instructions for making a Japanese club sandwich out of ration cards. He then proceeds to eat the "sandwich" and hits himself in the head with an actual club. Tojo now has a large lump on his head, and he is playing with his lips.

The next segment is "Nippon-Nifties Style Show", and the narrator presents a "Japanese Victory Suit". The narrator states that the suit has no cuffs, no pleats, and no lapel. This actually means there is no suit, and a small, almost-naked Japanese man wearing a diaper is shivering in the snow and trying to warm himself with a small candle.

The scene switches to a sports announcer, a Japanese man named Red Toga-San (whose name is a pun on sports journalists Red Barber and Stan Thorgerson), talking out of a hole around a black background. As he is making an announcement, the hole closes on his lips, which then fall to the ground and are revealed to be false teeth with the label "Made in Japan". The Japanese "King of Swat" (a reference to Babe Ruth's nickname as the Sultan of Swat) is shown in the next scene, wearing a baseball outfit next to a trophy that is identical to his head in shape. A fly then appears onscreen, and the "King of Swat" attempts to swat it while spinning around. The fly grabs the flyswatter from the "King of Swat" and hits him with it, then flies away with the trophy.

"Headline Poisonalities" shows some personalities that made the headline that week. Isoroku Yamamoto is seen standing behind a desk and introduces himself as he walks on stilts to look taller. He states that he "will dictate peace terms in the White House." An editor's note covers the screen, telling the audience that the room in the next scene is reserved for Yamamoto. When the card is removed, there is an opened door and inside the room is an electric chair, and Chopin's Marche funèbre is quoted. By the time this cartoon was released, Yamamoto was already killed in action after his plane was shot down by Allied forces a month prior.

The scene fades and the narrator explains how General Homma demonstrates "Japanese coolness and calmness during air raid attacks". However, this statement is ironic since Homma is shown running around in a forest and bumping into trees. Homma then panics and runs inside a hollow log. Homma sticks his head out of the log, panting. A skunk also comes out of the log and sniffs Homma in disgust, so it ducks back into the log and reappears with a gas mask.

"Flashes from the Axis" shows news from outside Japan. From Berlin, a caricature of Lord Haw-Haw appears as a donkey named "Lord Hee Haw" ('Chief Wind-Bag'). He brays loudly before reading from his papers, saying that "the Führer has just received a postcard from a friend vacationing abroad." Next a hand is seen holding a post-card, and the song O du lieber Augustin (due to the association with Germany) plays. It is flipped over, the other side has an image of Rudolf Hess in a concentration camp. The next scene shows that the other hand is that of Adolf Hitler who then twitches his mustache in confusion (in a similar manner to Charlie Chaplin).

From Rome, the "celebrated" Roman ruins are shown as Largo al factotum is quoted (hence the association with Italy). Each of the ruins are numbered with signs. Benito Mussolini is sitting on the pillar labelled as "Ruin #1" as he plays with a yo-yo with a sad expression on his face.

The next segment focuses on the "Japanese Navy... all at sea" and focuses on the achievements. A submarine appears, and the narrator says that it had launched three weeks ahead of schedule. However, this was apparently done prior to its completion, as workers are still building it as it moves underwater. A small Japanese man runs onscreen and tries to stop the submarine, but it crashes and he stops running and takes his hat off as "Taps" plays in the background. He then shrugs and walks in the opposite direction. A group of Japanese sailors are then seen using what the narrator calls "intricate and technical machinery", but are actually various arcade machines. The song that briefly plays in the background is Nagasaki.

The narrator then introduces a "happy gentleman" riding inside a human torpedo. The narrator then asks him if he has anything to say, and he responds with "No uh, nothing, except...RET ME OUTTA HERE!", apparently stuck inside the torpedo.

The final segment shows literal interpretations of boats and planes. A plane is shot in the air with what is stated to be a "super-duper cataproat device" but is in fact just a giant slingshot, or "catapult". Another plane has tricycle landing gear, made up of a tricycle with a small Japanese man riding on it. The aircraft carrier Skinomaru passes by, haphazardly carrying the wrecks of crashed airplanes. Finally, a navy minesweeper with arms floats by, and is literally sweeping away mines with a broom. The ship explodes, and after the smoke clears a buoy emerges out of the water with the note "Regrettable incident please".
