= Bugs Bunny Nips the Nips =

1944 film by Friz Freleng

- Lobby Card
- Directed by: I. Freleng
- Story by: Tedd Pierce
- Produced by: Leon Schlesinger
- Starring: Mel Blanc
- Music by: Carl W. Stalling
- Animation by: Gerry Chiniquy
- Color process: Technicolor
- Distributed by: Warner Bros. Pictures; The Vitaphone Corporation
- Release date: April 22, 1944
- Running time: 8:11 (one reel)
- Language: English

Bugs Bunny Nips the Nips is a 1944 Merrie Melodies cartoon directed by Friz Freleng. The cartoon, released on April 22, 1944, stars Bugs Bunny. A propaganda film that depicts Bugs fighting against the Imperial Japanese Army in the Pacific War, it is now considered controversial for caricaturing the Japanese enemy and expressing anti-Japanese sentiment, and while not one of the Censored Eleven cartoons it has been removed from circulation by Warner Bros.

== Plot ==
Somewhere in the Pacific, Bugs is floating in a box, singing to himself, when "the island that inevitably turns up in this kind of picture" turns up. Bugs swims towards it, admiring the peace and quiet, when bombs start going off as "The Storm" from the William Tell Overture (1829) is heard in the background. Bugs ducks into a haystack, and soon comes face-to-face with a Japanese soldier: a short, bespectacled, buck-toothed, bare-footed, slant-eyed Japanese man who pronounces "L" as "R", and who might be rapidly stating the names of Japanese cities whenever he moves. The soldier chases Bugs into a rabbit hole, into which the soldier dumps a bomb. However, Bugs manages to blow up the soldier with the bomb. When the soldier tries to swing a sword at Bugs, Bugs appears as a Japanese general (presumably Hideki Tojo), but is soon recognized by his trademark carrot-eating, prompting the soldier (who says that he had seen Bugs in the "Warner Bros. Leon Schlesinger Merrie Melodies cartoon pictures", referring to the fact that Bugs was originally exclusive to that series) to ask him, "What's up, Honorable Doc?"

Bugs then jumps into a plane (which looks like a Mitsubishi A6M Zero); the soldier also jumps into a plane (which also looks like a Zero). However, Bugs ties the soldier's plane to a tree, causing the plane to be yanked out from under him. The soldier parachutes down but is met in mid-air by Bugs, who hands "Moto" (cf. Mr. Moto) some "scrap iron" (an anvil), causing the soldier to fall. Painting a Japanese flag on a tree to denote one soldier down, Bugs runs into a sumo wrestler, against whom he confidently faces off (cockily marking a second and bigger flag on the tree). After being temporarily beaten by the sumo wrestler (and wiping the second mark off the tree before collapsing), Bugs dresses as a geisha and knocks out the wrestler, who repaints the second flag on the tree before passing out.

Seeing a group of Japanese landing craft making their way toward the island (and exclaiming "Japs! Hundreds of 'em!"), Bugs thinks of a plan to get rid of them all. He comes out in a "Good Rumor" (a parody of Good Humor) truck, which plays Mozart ("Der Vogelfänger bin ich ja" from The Magic Flute), and hands each of the Japanese an ice-cream bar with a grenade inside it, calling them racist slurs such as "monkey-face" and "slant-eyes" while doing so. All of the Japanese are killed by the explosions except one, who is killed after redeeming a 'free' ice-cream bar from Bugs. Having now painted dozens of Japanese flags on the trees, denoting all the downed enemy forces, Bugs comments again about the "peace and quiet – and if there's one thing I CAN'T stand, it's peace and quiet!"

Then Bugs spots an American battleship (presumed to be the USS Iowa) in the distance and raises a white flag, yelling for them to come get him, but they keep going. Bugs is insulted. "Do they think I want to spend the rest of my life on this island?" With this remark, a female rabbit (dressed in a Hawaiian outfit, possibly a caricature of Dorothy Lamour) appears, saying, "It's a possibility!" Bugs pulls down the distress flag, lets out a wolf-cry and goes running after her.

== Cast ==
- Mel Blanc as Bugs Bunny and Japanese soldiers
- Bea Benaderet as Female Bunny (uncredited)

== Analysis ==
The films depicting the Japanese enemy during World War II tended both to identify a formidable wartime adversary and to depict the adversary as inferior to his American counterparts. In cartoons, this translated to a tendency to depict the Japanese as either superman or buffoon. This film more closely represents the latter tendency. The caricature portrayal of this film serves as a host to well-worn stereotypes.

The film opens with Bugs singing "Someone's Rocking My Dreamboat" from within a crate floating on the ocean. He is somewhere in the Pacific and is waiting for "the inevitable island" to turn up. He then sees an island and swims towards its beach. Already in the introduction, Bugs identifies his Pacific island setting as a "garden of Eden" and a "Shangri-La", the latter of which is in reference to the exotic havens depicted in South Sea island films and to the epic film Lost Horizon (1937). Only then is Bugs alerted to the mortal danger that awaits him on the island. The seductive first impression serves to set up a hazardous trap.

Bugs escapes rapid gunfire by running for cover into a haystack. The initial encounter of Bugs with a Japanese soldier presents an optical illusion, that the two share a body. Bugs' head peeks above the haystack, while the legs of the soldier appear below it. Then the owner of the feet confronts Bugs. The soldier has buck teeth, a thin mustache, dark eyeglasses, slanted eyebrows and curly, wavy hair.

The soldier pulls out a sword and starts swiping at Bugs. He speaks in Oriental-sounding gibberish, consisting of short syllables spoken in a staccato voice. In response, Bugs assumes the form of a Japanese general and stands stiffly at attention. Bugs' face is briefly transformed into a Japanese caricature, only to be contrasted with the face of an actual, if impish, Japanese soldier. Bugs disguised as a general imitates photographs of Hideki Tojo. The soldier bows in supplication to the authority figure. Bugs accidentally gives away his identity by casually chewing on a carrot.

The soldier resumes use of his sword and talks gibberish again. Bugs takes off in a Japanese plane, followed by the soldier in his own plane. Both planes are presumably based on the Mitsubishi A6M Zero. Bugs ties the rival plane to a tree. The soldier parachutes out and Bugs hands him an anvil. Mocking: "Here's some scrap iron for Japan, Moto." There is a spoken reference to Mr. Moto to provide a well-acquainted name to the wartime enemy.

Bugs then bumps into a sumo wrestler. The man is huge with a large stomach, a mustache, a goatee, buck teeth with a large gap between the front teeth, and a Mohawk/queue hairstyle. In response, Bugs transforms into a geisha. He speaks in Japanese-sounding gibberish and coaxes the wrestler into a near kiss. The kiss turns into a fatal blow with a mallet. Bugs triumphantly shouts "timber" as the man falls. The masquerade scene involving the wrestler and the geisha makes use of two relatively harmless civilian-type characters to cast the enemy in a humorous light. In concept, it suggests that an Oriental guise can be put on and discarded at will.

Bugs then sees several Japanese ships floating towards the island. He is next seen disguised as an ice cream truck vendor in the mold of the Good Humor man. He entices many Japanese soldiers to come get their ice cream. There are many Japanese soldiers besieging Bugs' ice cream truck. Suggesting that their threat relies on their numbers. They are an easily fooled mob, not a group of individuals. They resemble a swarm of bees and they are rendered less as human figures and more like a scourge in need of extermination.

Bugs insults his customers by calling them "monkey face" and "slant eyes". The scene with the ice cream track partially obscures the faces and bodies of the enemy soldiers, but Bugs verbalizes a physical description. The phrases "bowlegs", "monkey face", "slant eyes" both serve as racial epithets and audibly support the visualized stereotypes of the film. They are all elements of the Japanese wartime caricature.

They get served with chocolate-covered ice cream bars embedded with grenades. The soldiers run off as soon as they get served. Then numerous explosions are heard. One battered soldier returns to present his specially-marked stick, earning him a free ice cream bar. He is the last one. Bugs' mission is accomplished. He then signals an American ship to come get him.

Bugs hates being confined to a world of "peace and quiet". He celebrates the approach of an American ship and his potential rescue, until he meets a sarong-clad female bunny. The female bunny ignites his passion. He howls and thumps his foot, his eyes bulging from their sockets. He leaps into an amorous pursuit and the film ends.

The short placed an emphasis on physical peculiarities to imply racial inferiority. The preeminent danger is positioned to be treachery and not military might. The Japanese are distinctively othered as physically deformed. The Japanese are characterized as single-minded, subservient to their superiors and gullible. The gag with the ice cream-seeking soldiers makes use of the American perception of the Japanese as both gullible and greedy. Bugs' stereotypical portrayal of Japanese womanhood renders him a meek and seductive creature, speaking in a falsetto voice.

The short has similarities to both Wackiki Wabbit (1943) and Herr Meets Hare (1945). The soundtrack includes "Trade Winds" and "Someone's Rocking My Dreamboat". There are two musical quotations from Die Walküre (1870) by Richard Wagner. The Japanese soldiers are repeatedly presented on screen to the tune of the Kimigayo (1870). The ice cream truck scene uses the tune of the opening aria of Papageno, from The Magic Flute (1791) by Mozart. When Bugs professes his hatred of the peace and quiet, demanding someone to get him out of this place, the tune is the Ride of the Valkyries.

Neil Lerner attempts to decipher Carl Stalling's intentions in quoting Wagner at the end of the battle scenes. He suggests that it is connected to the role of the Valkyries, taking fallen warriors to Valhalla. In this case, the use is ironic as Stalling would not view the deceased Japanese soldiers as fallen heroes who deserve an afterlife paradise.

As Bugs signals the American ship, the tune is from the scene where Brünnhilde announces her pregnancy. Lerner suggests that Stalling was inspired by the name of Siegfried, "peace through victory". Stalling could intend the scene to represent the United States reaching such a peace. Alternatively, he might be inspired by the stark isolation of Brünnhilde on a rocky mountain – in which case, the reference would have been Bugs being trapped on the island.

== Reception ==
- The Film Daily called the eight-minute short "good fun" and gave the following synopsis:

"Bugs Bunny, cast away on a Pacific isle, thinks the setting ideal until he finds his paradise infested with Japanese soldiers. How he single-handedly exterminates the enemy makes for a laugh-filled few minutes of typical Bugs antics, off-screen remarks and action in this Technicolor cartoon produced by Leon Schlesinger."

== Notes ==
Since the 1960s, Bugs Bunny Nips the Nips has been controversial because of its racial stereotyping. However, the cartoon was not one of the "Censored Eleven" and was occasionally shown on television in syndicated packages with other pre-August 1948 Warner Bros. cartoons whose copyrights were under the ownership of Associated Artists Productions. The short debuted on home video in December 1991 on the first volume of MGM/UA Home Video's Golden Age of Looney Tunes LaserDisc collection, a 5-disc set that was later issued via 10 separate tapes in 1993. The Japanese American Citizens League started publicly going against its distribution in February 1995 after a Sacramento resident who watched the tape with it with his grandson notified the organization a month prior. Due to expenses, MGM was indecisive about releasing a version of the collection the short was in that would exclude it, but ultimately decided to do so.

This was one of the 12 Bugs Bunny cartoons that were pulled out of Cartoon Network's June Bugs 2001 marathon by order of AOL Time Warner due to stereotypes of Japanese people. However, in a promo for this event, the ending scene where Bugs does a double-take on noticing the female rabbit was used.

== See also ==
- Anti-Japanese propaganda
- Tokio Jokio
- List of World War II short films
- Bugs Bunny filmography
- Looney Tunes and Merrie Melodies filmography (1940–1949)
- Lola Bunny, a later female character

Preceded by Bugs Bunny and the Three Bears	Bugs Bunny Cartoons; 1944	Succeeded by Hare Ribbin'
