= Gopher Goofy =

1942 film by Norman McCabe

- Title card
- Directed by: Norman McCabe
- Story by: Don Christensen
- Produced by: Leon Schlesinger
- Starring: Mel Blanc
- Music by: Carl W. Stalling
- Animation by: Isadore Ellis
- Color process: Black and white
- Production company: Leon Schlesinger Productions
- Distributed by: Warner Bros. Pictures
- Release date: June 27, 1942
- Running time: 7 min
- Country: United States
- Language: English

Gopher Goofy is a 1942 American animated comedy short film directed by Norman McCabe. The short was released on June 27, 1942.

== Plot ==
The film

A homeowner is enjoying his lovely lawn and garden when it is invaded by a couple of gophers with Brooklyn accents, one a slow-paced gopher named Virgil and another who sounds like Bugs Bunny. The homeowner attacks by trying to cut their heads off with hedge trimmers, but the gophers hide back into the hole. The homeowner then tries to listen in the hole with his ear, but the active gopher yells, "Let's not get nosy, bub," loudly into the ear. The homeowner reads a book on how to exterminate the gophers, while the same gopher bites down the hoe he was standing on and makes the homeowner fall. The homeowner tries to nab the gopher with the same hoe, but constantly misses.

The homeowner attempts to blast the gophers with a shotgun, which also misses, as the active gopher stands in between the barrels. With the help of Virgil, they confuse the homeowner and burrow a hole for the homeowner to fall into. As the homeowner resurfaces, he is whacked in the head with a sign reading "Be Kind to Gophers Week". The homeowner gasses them with helium, and they float away, causing a crow to throw away his bottle of alcohol. The inflated gophers hit a tree after being scared by the homeowner and fall down to the tomato garden. As the gardener fishes for the gophers under his hat, they substitute it for a tomato, he felt and splat it, thinking he's squished the gophers. When he remove his hat to check, he sees a gopher hole with a sign saying, "Out to Lunch". Then, he cries in a tantrum fit.

Finally, the homeowner tries to flood the burrows with a garden hose. Virgil stop the flow until there's a huge blast of water, which they direct back at the homeowner. The homeowner finally loses it and jumps into the ground and starts burrowing himself like a gopher, before hitting his fountain, destroying the statue on top of the fountain and surfacing there. Virgil responds, "Well, what do you know, eh? Somethin' new has been added!" while the homeowner squirts water out of his mouth and then his ears.
