= Injun Trouble =

Injun Trouble may refer to three different animated shorts:

- Injun Trouble (1938 film), directed by Bob Clampett
- Injun Trouble, a 1951 Mighty Mouse film directed by Connie Rasinski
- Injun Trouble (1969 film), directed by Robert McKimson
