= My Favorite Duck =

1942 film by Charles M. Jones

- Original title card
- Directed by: Charles M. Jones
- Story by: Mike Maltese
- Produced by: Leon Schlesinger
- Starring: Mel Blanc
- Music by: Carl W. Stalling
- Animation by: Rudy Larriva
- Color process: Technicolor
- Production company: Leon Schlesinger Productions
- Distributed by: Warner Bros. Pictures
- Release date: December 5, 1942
- Running time: 7 min
- Country: United States
- Language: English

My Favorite Duck is a 1942 American animated comedy short film directed by Charles M. Jones. The cartoon was released on December 5, 1942. It is part of the Looney Tunes series, the 99th cartoon to feature Porky Pig after a ten-month hiatus (the mandate of his appearances was lifted after Porky's Cafe) and the eighteenth cartoon to feature Daffy Duck. It was re-released as a "Blue Ribbon" reissue in 1950, rendering the original film lost, though Michael Maltese kept the title and credits cels.

== Plot ==
Porky Pig is on a camping vacation beside a lake which happens to be the residence of Daffy Duck. The duck intentionally ruins Porky's attempts at relaxation, and each time Porky is riled enough to threaten violence, Daffy produces a sign reminding him that it is not duck hunting season, and that there is a hefty fine for even "molesting" (i.e. "bothering") a duck. When Porky calls Daffy screwy, Daffy makes eyes with Porky and responds "That, my little cherub, is strictly a matter of opinion."

Porky stammers and stutters his way through the standard "On Moonlight Bay" from 1912, while Daffy periodically breaks into a somewhat-sultry version of a then-recent hit called "Blues in the Night". At one point, Porky unconsciously starts to sing Daffy's number, then stops, looks at the audience with a "Harumph!" and returns to singing "Moonlight Bay".

Daffy continues to torment and enrage Porky with various gags until finally, new signs have been posted announcing that duck hunting season is now open, one sign even suggesting that Daffy be shot, specifically. While Porky chases Daffy around a tree, the film suddenly breaks; Daffy then walks into a white screen and makes the following announcement: "Ladies and gentlemen, due to circumstances beyond our control, we are unable to continue this picture. But don't worry, I'll tell you how it came out." The duck begins to describe how he beat up Porky; a hook then whisks Daffy offscreen and a loud smashing sound is heard. Porky then drags the dazed duck across the screen, his shotgun now bent in the form of Daffy's head.

== Voice cast ==
- Mel Blanc as Daffy Duck / Porky Pig / Baby Eagle / Father Eagle

== Production notes ==
The song, "Blues in the Night" (Music by Harold Arlen; lyrics by Johnny Mercer) is perhaps better known as "My Mama Done Tol' Me When I Was in Kneepants" and is from the 1941 Warner Bros. film, Blues in the Night. The song had been recently nominated as the Best Song Oscar for Warner Bros. shortly before My Favorite Duck was released.

== Home media ==
- VHS 1986 - Viddy-Oh! For Kids Cartoon Festivals: Porky Pig Cartoon Festival Featuring "Tom Turk and Daffy" - MGM/UA Home Video
- VHS 1986 - Cartoon Moviestars: Porky! - MGM/UA Home Video
- Laserdisc 1988 - Cartoon Moviestars: Daffy! & Porky! - MGM/UA Home Video
- Laserdisc 1991 - The Golden Age of Looney Tunes: Vol. 1 - MGM/UA Home Video
- VHS 1992 - The Golden Age of Looney Tunes: Vol. 5 - Chuck Jones - MGM/UA Home Video
- DVD 2006 - Looney Tunes Golden Collection: Volume 4 (extra, unrestored) - Warner Home Video
- DVD 2008 - Blues in the Night (extra, unrestored) - Warner Home Video
- DVD 2008 - Looney Tunes Golden Collection: Volume 6 (restored) - Warner Home Video
- DVD 2008 - Looney Tunes Spotlight Collection: Volume 6 (restored) - Warner Home Video
- Blu-Ray 2026 - Looney Tunes Collector's Vault: Volume 3 (restored) - Warner Archive Collection

== See also ==
- Looney Tunes and Merrie Melodies filmography (1940–1949)
- Daffy Duck filmography
- Porky Pig filmography

Preceded by Porky's Cafe	Porky Pig Cartoons; 1942	Succeeded by Confusions of a Nutzy Spy

Preceded by The Daffy Duckaroo	Daffy Duck Cartoons; 1942	Succeeded by To Duck or Not to Duck
