= The Impatient Patient =

1942 film by Norman McCabe

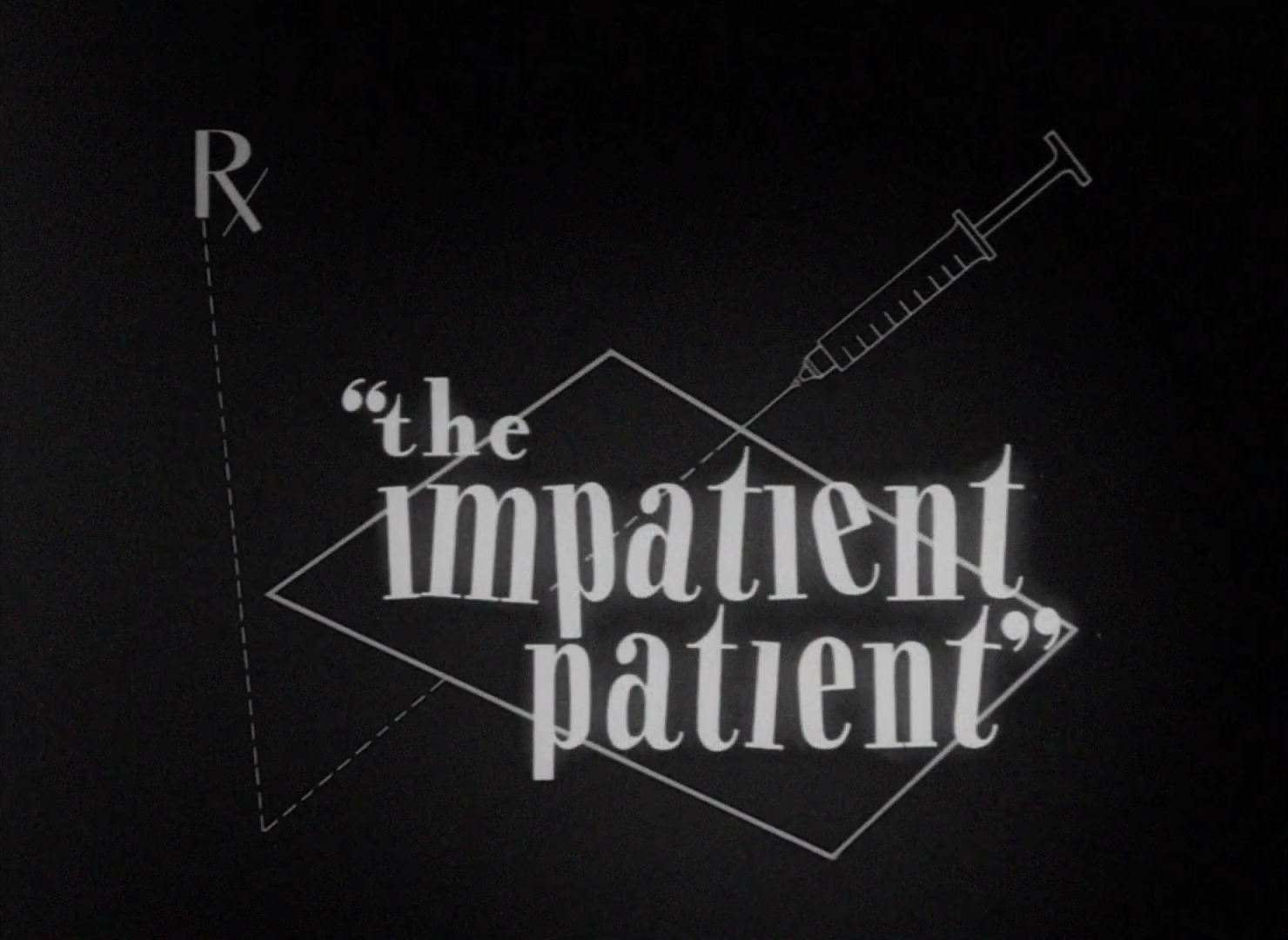
- Title card
- Directed by: Norman McCabe
- Story by: Don Christensen
- Produced by: Leon Schlesinger
- Starring: Mel Blanc
- Music by: Carl W. Stalling
- Animation by: Vive Risto
- Color process: Black-and-white
- Production company: Leon Schlesinger Productions
- Distributed by: Warner Bros. Pictures
- Release date: September 5, 1942
- Running time: 8 min
- Country: United States
- Language: English

The Impatient Patient is a 1942 American animated comedy short film directed by Norman McCabe. The cartoon was released on September 5, 1942. It is part of the Looney Tunes series and the sixteenth cartoon to star Daffy Duck.

Adding to the medical theme, the signatures of the personnel credited (McCabe, writer Don Christensen, animator Vive Risto and music composer Carl W. Stalling) were featured in the opening credits, just as a doctor would sign a prescription.

== Plot ==
While traipsing through the Ookaboochie Swamps, Daffy Duck seeks to deliver a telegram to "Chloe". Unable to find the telegram's recipient, and suffering from a severe case of hiccups, he stumbles upon the home of "Dr. Jerkyl" and hopes that the physician can cure his condition. Daffy's hiccups are so severe that they cause him to damage or destroy everything around him.

Dr. Jerkyl captures Daffy and restrains him to a doctor's chair. Hoping to scare Daffy in order to cure his hiccups, Dr. Jerkyl creates and drinks a potion that turns him into Chloe, a grotesque ogre. Daffy, realizing he has reached his destination, then reads Chloe the telegram: the lyrics to "Happy Birthday To You" (albeit spoken and not sung), sent to him by Frank N. Stein.

Chloe, who wants to "rassle" Daffy (who, in turn, is now cured of his hiccups), chases the duck around the laboratory until the radio is accidentally switched on, prompting him to dance. Once the music ends, the chase resumes. Daffy scrambles to the lab table and mixes a potion, which turns Chloe into an infant. As each brandishes a hammer insisting each one doesn't know the other that well (doing imitations of Red Skelton's "Mean Widdle Kid" character), the action moves offscreen, a large thud is heard, and the bird from the doctor's cuckoo clock displays a large sign reading "He Dood It!" The baby Dr. Jerkyl then screams "Ooo, you broke my little head! Ooh, you broke my little spine! Oh!"

== Voice cast ==
- Mel Blanc as Daffy Duck / Dr. Jerkyll / Chloe / Announcer / Radio Voices

== Colorization ==
This cartoon was colorized in 1968 (just after Seven Arts Productions, successor to Guild Films, to whom the TV distribution rights to the black-and-white cartoon library had been sold some time before, acquired Warner Bros.) by having every other frame traced over onto a cel. Each redrawn cel was painted in color and then photographed over a colored reproduction of each original background. The animation quality dropped considerably from the original version with this method.

The cartoon was colorized again in 1992, this time with a computer adding color to a new print of the original black-and-white cartoon. This preserved the quality of the original animation (the end result also resembled the actual color cartoons released around the same time).

== Home media ==
- VHS 1992 - Daffy Duck: Tales from the Duckside (computer colorized) - Warner Home Video
- Blu-Ray 2024 - Looney Tunes Collector's Choice: Volume 4 (restored, black and white) - Warner Archive Collection

== See also ==
- Daffy Duck filmography
- Looney Tunes and Merrie Melodies filmography (1940–1949)
- List of animated films in the public domain in the United States

Preceded by Daffy's Southern Exposure	Daffy Duck Cartoons; 1942	Succeeded by The Daffy Duckaroo
