= Confusions of a Nutzy Spy =

1943 film by Norman McCabe

- Title card
- Directed by: Norman McCabe
- Story by: Don Christensen
- Produced by: Leon Schlesinger
- Starring: Mel Blanc
- Music by: Carl W. Stalling
- Animation by: Isadore Ellis
- Color process: Black and white
- Production company: Leon Schlesinger Productions
- Distributed by: Warner Bros. Pictures
- Release date: January 23, 1943
- Running time: 7 min
- Country: United States
- Language: English

Confusions of a Nutzy Spy is a 1943 American animated comedy short film directed by Norman McCabe. The short was released on January 23, 1943. It is part of the Looney Tunes series and the 100th cartoon to star Porky Pig. The title is a pun of the film title Confessions of a Nazi Spy.

== Plot ==
The cartoon opens by panning past a number of signs in "Ye Towne Cooler" that make fun of small town prisons and various criminal practices. Eggbert, a bloodhound, is asleep. A nearby radio alarm clock goes off and wakes him up. The broadcast annoys him so much that he breaks the radio with a mallet. Porky enters with a wanted poster, and Eggbert is about to hit Porky with the mallet, until Porky says they need to catch a spy. Eggbert sneezes forcefully enough that Porky is blown clear out of the town jail. The wanted poster lands on the spy's face.

Eggbert has trouble finding the spy (presumably due to his nasal congestion). When he and Porky do catch up to the spy, the spy tries to fool Porky with disguises. Eggbert sneezes again, which blows both him and Porky away from the spy.

The spy sets a bomb to blow up a railroad bridge. When the bomb's timer only has one minute left on it, he reveals his plan to Porky before he notices that Eggbert has retrieved the bomb and placed it at his feet. The spy throws the bomb away, but Eggbert retrieves it again (and again).

The spy, Porky, Eggbert, and the bomb all end up in a cave together. Eggbert sneezes yet again, everyone gets blown away, and the spy and the bomb land next to each other as time runs out. Nothing happens, so the spy thinks the bomb is a dud and becomes upset. He slams it on the ground and it blows up. The spy flies up into the clouds, where he jumps around, celebrating the fact that the bomb worked after all. He gives the Nazi salute and falls backward, his feet forming the V sign.

== Home media ==
The short is available as an extra on disc 2 of Looney Tunes Golden Collection: Volume 6, and as a main short on disc 5 of Porky Pig 101. On both DVD sets, the short is presented unrestored.

== See also ==
- Porky Pig filmography
- Looney Tunes and Merrie Melodies filmography (1940–1949)
