= Wagon Heels =

- Title card
- Directed by: Robert Clampett
- Written by: Warren Foster
- Starring: Mel Blanc; Robert C. Bruce (unc.)
- Music by: Carl W. Stalling
- Animation by: Rod Scribner; Manny Gould; I. Ellis (credit only); C. Melendez; Robert McKimson (unc.); A.C. Gamer (effects)
- Layouts by: Thomas McKimson
- Backgrounds by: Michael Sasanoff
- Color process: Technicolor
- Production company: Warner Bros. Cartoons
- Distributed by: Warner Bros. Pictures; The Vitaphone Corporation
- Release date: July 28, 1945
- Running time: 7:11
- Language: English

Wagon Heels is a 1945 Warner Bros. Merrie Melodies short directed by Bob Clampett. The short was released on July 28, 1945, and stars Porky Pig.

== Plot ==
Porky Pig leads a wagon train to California, keeping an eye out for the formidable Native American "Super Chief", Injun Joe. Along the way, they encounter the goofy hillbilly Sloppy Moe, who has a secret he will not reveal until the crucial moment. When Sloppy finally reveals that Injun Joe is ticklish, chaos ensues as Moe tickles the chief, causing him to fall off a cliff and stretch the U.S. from coast to coast. The narrator ends the tale by celebrating Porky and Sloppy Moe as heroes, with Moe tickling a giggling Porky.

== Production notes ==
The cartoon is a color remake of the Looney Tunes black-and-white short Injun Trouble (1938). All voices except narration and Sloppy Moe are performed by Mel Blanc, whose screen credit is his first in a non-Bugs Bunny cartoon. In addition to the usual Native American stereotype music, Carl Stalling's underscore frequently plays segments of the American Civil War tune, "Kingdom Coming", even converting it to a minor key in one segment. "Oh! Susanna" is also heard repeatedly in the underscore. Wagon Heels is also the first cartoon to open with an updated version of the Merrie Melodies theme.

While Izzy Ellis receives credit receives credit for animation in this cartoon, he did not animate any footage in the film. It's likely a clerical error as Ellis bounced between Bob Clampett and Robert McKimson's units at the time. Ellis however did animate the original version of the cartoon.

The cartoon has been criticized for its stereotypical and insensitive depictions of Native Americans.

The film is set during the California Gold Rush, and depicts Porky Pig leading a wagon train to California. He is opposed by Injun Joe, a Native American chief who has claimed any area to the west of the Eastern Seaboard as his own.

== Home media ==
DVD:

- Looney Tunes Golden Collection: Volume 5
- Looney Tunes Super Stars: Porky Pig and Friends: Hilarious Ham

Blu-ray:

- Looney Tunes Collector's Vault: Volume 2

== See also ==
- Porky Pig filmography
- Looney Tunes and Merrie Melodies filmography (1940–1949)
