= Along Came Daffy =

- Directed by: I. Freleng
- Story by: Michael Maltese; Tedd Pierce
- Starring: Mel Blanc
- Music by: Carl Stalling
- Animation by: Manuel Perez; Ken Champin; Virgil Ross; Gerry Chiniquy
- Layouts by: Hawley Pratt
- Backgrounds by: Philip DeGuard
- Color process: Technicolor
- Production company: Warner Bros. Cartoons
- Distributed by: Warner Bros. Pictures
- Release date: June 14, 1947
- Running time: 7 minutes
- Language: English

Along Came Daffy is a 1947 Warner Bros. Looney Tunes cartoon directed by Friz Freleng and written by Michael Maltese and Tedd Pierce. The cartoon was released on June 14, 1947, and stars Daffy Duck and Yosemite Sam.

== Plot ==
Snowbound in a cabin with no food, a starving, emaciated mouse eats a picture of cheese then belches confetti. Yosemite Sam and his black-haired twin are so hungry they begin hallucinating and appear to one another as a roast turkey and a Dagwood sandwich. Just as they begin approaching each other hungrily with knives and forks drawn, their frenzy is interrupted by the arrival of door-to-door salesman Daffy Duck, selling cookbooks. Intent on making the duck their meal, the two famished brothers relentlessly chase Daffy throughout the cabin, eventually catch him and throw him into the oven. To save himself, Daffy then offers them a complimentary six-course turkey dinner, which he produces from his sample case before hastily departing. However, just as Sam and his brother prepare to indulge, a swarm of mice emerges from the wall, and swiftly devours the feast.

A moment later, Daffy returns to the cabin, this time offering after-dinner mints. Still starving, the brothers seize Daffy and slam the door shut, prompting the duck to open it and tell the audience "Well, here we go again!" before being pulled back inside.

== Voice Cast ==
- Mel Blanc as Daffy Duck / Yosemite Sam / Sam's Brother / Mice

== Production notes ==
Along Came Daffy is one of only two Warner Bros. shorts (the other being Honey's Money from 1962), where Yosemite Sam is not paired with his usual antagonist, Bugs Bunny. Along Came Daffy features a scene where Daffy briefly mimics Bugs by miming chewing a carrot and uttering a variation of Bugs's iconic catchphrase, "What's cookin, Doc?" This narrative structure revisits the theme of two characters endeavoring to consume Daffy in a similar manner as seen in Daffy's Southern Exposure (1942).

== Home media ==
- VHS 1986 - Viddy-Oh! For Kids Cartoon Festivals: Daffy Duck Cartoon Festival Featuring "Daffy Duck and the Dinosaur" - MGM/UA Home Video
- VHS 1988 - Cartoon Moviestars: Just Plain Daffy - MGM/UA Home Video
- Laserdisc 1992 - The Golden Age of Looney Tunes: Volume 3 - MGM/UA Home Video
- Blu-Ray 2024 - Looney Tunes Collector's Choice: Volume 4 (restored) - Warner Archive Collection

== See also ==
- Daffy Duck filmography
- Yosemite Sam filmography
- Looney Tunes and Merrie Melodies filmography (1940–1949)
