= The Ducktators =

1942 film by Norman McCabe

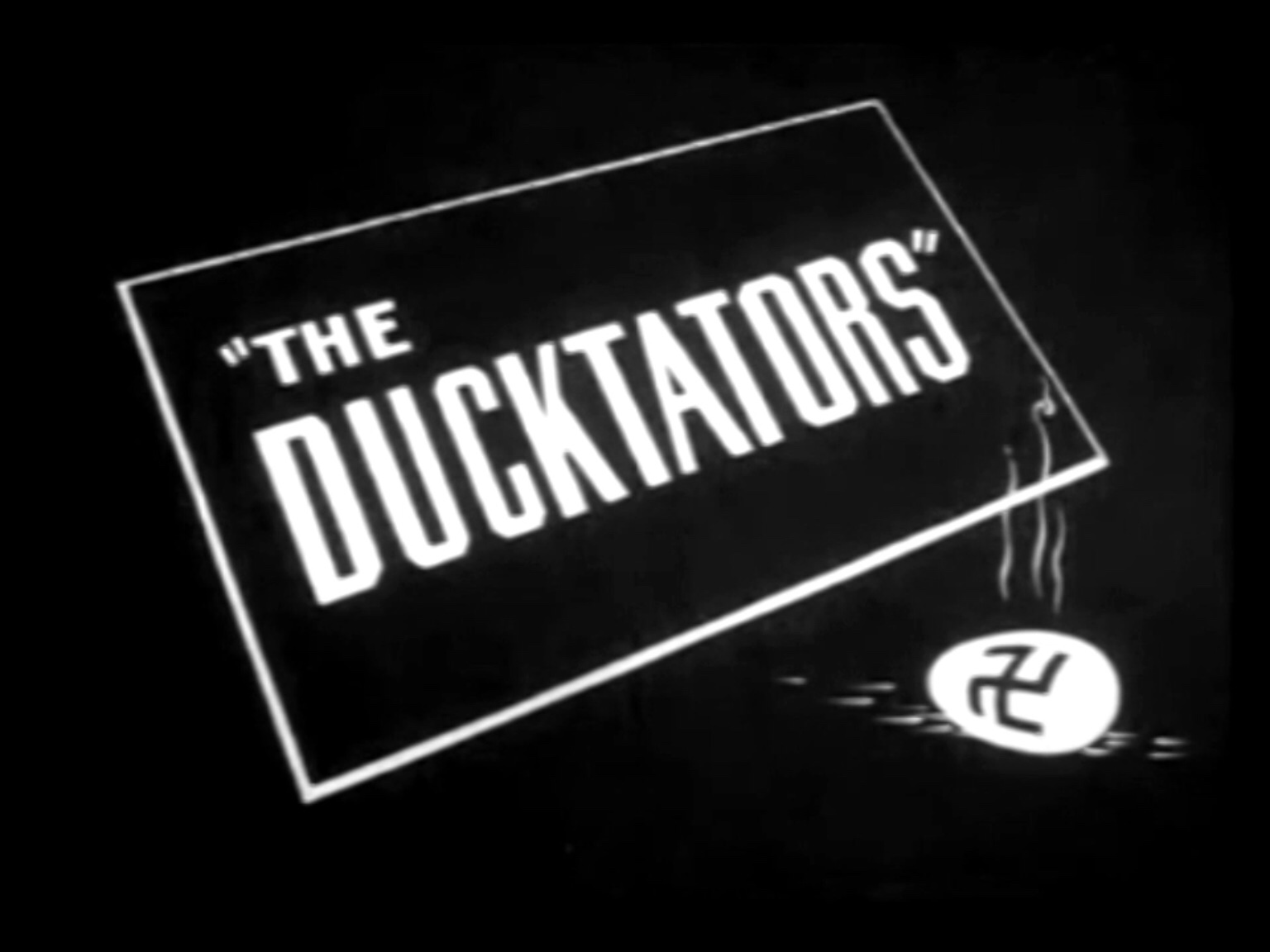
- Title card
- Directed by: Norman McCabe
- Story by: Melvin Millar
- Produced by: Leon Schlesinger
- Starring: Mel Blanc; Michael Maltese
- Music by: Carl W. Stalling
- Animation by: John Carey
- Color process: Black and white
- Production company: Leon Schlesinger Productions
- Distributed by: Warner Bros. Pictures
- Release date: August 1, 1942
- Running time: 7 min
- Country: United States
- Language: English

The Ducktators is a 1942 American animated propaganda short film directed by Norman McCabe. The short was released on August 1, 1942, and satirizes events of World War II. The title is a pun on dictator.

== Plot ==
Full short with original ending

A pair of farm ducks eagerly await the hatching of their duckling from a uniquely black-colored egg. To their surprise, a white duckling with a toothbrush moustache emerges, named Adolf Hitler (a caricature of the first Dictator), who immediately shouts "Sieg Heil!" and gives the Nazi salute. Throughout his adulthood, Hitler gives aggressive speeches in Denglisch to the other ducks and geese, with his only ally being a large Neapolitan-accented goose named Benito Mussolini (a caricature of the second Dictator).

As Hitler's stormtroopers surround the farm, a Dove of Peace watches from above, weeping at the impending violence. A peace conference is attempted, but Hitler disrupts it by shredding the peace treaty and inciting a brawl. Meanwhile, a peculiar Japanese duck named Hideki Tojo (a caricature of the third Dictator) arrives to support Hitler and Mussolini but inadvertently angers a sea turtle by mistaking it for an island and planting a sign which reads "Japanese Mandate Island" on its shell.

The trio of Hitler, Mussolini, and Tojo set out to conquer the farm, but the Dove of Peace, aided by chickens, a rescued chick, and a rabbit resembling Jerry Colonna (of its caricature), thwarts their plans. The Dove then proudly displays the defeated trio's heads as trophies while encouraging patriotism through buying United States' state bonds.

== Political references ==
The duckling that hatched from the egg had a mustache and a Nazi emblem throughout the cartoon, indicating that this character symbolized Adolf Hitler. The goose who became a comrade to the duck had an open Italian accent and, at the end of one of his speeches, a chick can be heard yelling "Duce!" multiple times, indicating that this goose is Benito Mussolini. The second duck utilized the flag of the Empire of Japan, and openly sang a version of "The Japanese Sandman" with altered lyrics. He is presumably intended to be Hideki Tojo, judging by the military hat he is wearing. However, he is commonly misidentified as Hirohito. The black duck may be a reference to Rommel as he was also from South Germany and spoke with an accent, but can also relate to how African Americans were a huge demographic in the Southern United States at the time.

The original ending, featuring the Dove proudly displaying his defeated enemies' heads above the fireplace and urging viewers to buy war bonds, was rarely seen after the short was syndicated to TV through Guild Films in the 1950s. While the cartoon is in the public domain, this edited version has often appeared on VHS and DVD collections. However, the uncut and uncensored full ending can be found on the Looney Tunes Golden Collection: Volume 6 DVD set and in the World War II cartoons special on the Cartoon Network show ToonHeads.

== Reception ==
The Film Daily called the short "Acceptable", saying, "Hitler, Mussolini and Hirohito are taken for a ride – a one-way ride – in this animated cartoon, which produces many laughs at their expense."

== Home media ==
Due to the short's depiction of World War II and racial stereotypes, The Ducktators has rarely been shown on American television, except for Cartoon Network as part of its anthology television show, ToonHeads. It is available uncut on Looney Tunes Golden Collection: Volume 6, Disc 2.

== See also ==
- Adolf Hitler in popular culture
- List of World War II short films
- List of animated films in the public domain in the United States
