= Daffy Duck Slept Here =

- Title card
- Directed by: Robert McKimson
- Story by: Warren Foster
- Starring: Mel Blanc
- Music by: Carl Stalling
- Animation by: Manny Gould; Charles McKimson; I. Ellis; Anatolle Kirsanoff (unc.); Fred Abranz (unc.)
- Layouts by: Cornett Wood
- Backgrounds by: Richard H. Thomas
- Color process: Technicolor
- Production company: Warner Bros. Cartoons
- Distributed by: Warner Bros. Pictures; The Vitaphone Corporation
- Release date: March 6, 1948
- Running time: 7:07
- Country: United States
- Language: English

Daffy Duck Slept Here is a 1948 Warner Bros. Merrie Melodies cartoon, directed by Robert McKimson. The cartoon was released on March 6, 1948, and stars Porky Pig and Daffy Duck.

== Plot ==
Porky Pig, amidst a bustling city with no available hotel rooms due to a convention, reluctantly shares his lodging with the boisterous and irritating Daffy Duck. Throughout the night, Daffy's disruptive behavior escalates, culminating in Porky's frustration and eventual retaliation by confining Daffy in a pillowcase and discarding him out of the window. Undeterred, Daffy returns, intent on revenge.

Exploiting Porky's drowsiness, Daffy deceives him into believing he is boarding a train, only to witness Porky's departure on an actual locomotive. Despite his annoyance, Daffy expresses amusement at the situation, remarking on Porky's lack of reading material for the journey.

== Voice Cast ==
- Mel Blanc as Daffy Duck / Porky Pig / Hotel Managers / Elevator Boy

== Production notes ==
The title is a play on the cliché, "George Washington slept here." The film is a sequel to 1947's A Pest in the House, which also features Daffy disturbing a hotel patron's sleep.

== Home media ==
- VHS 1986 - Viddy-Oh! For Kids Cartoon Festivals: Daffy Duck Cartoon Festival Featuring "Ain't That Ducky" - MGM/UA Home Video
- VHS 1988 - Cartoon Moviestars: Just Plain Daffy - MGM/UA Home Video
- Laserdisc 1992 - The Golden Age of Looney Tunes: Volume 3 - MGM/UA Home Video
- DVD 2005 - Looney Tunes Golden Collection: Volume 3 (restored) - Warner Home Video
- DVD 2018 - Stars of Space Jam: Daffy Duck (restored) - Warner Home Video

== See also ==
- Looney Tunes and Merrie Melodies filmography (1940–1949)
- Daffy Duck filmography
- Porky Pig filmography
