= Injun Trouble (1938 film) =

1938 film by Robert Clampett

- Title card
- Directed by: Robert Clampett
- Produced by: Leon Schlesinger
- Starring: Mel Blanc; Billy Bletcher
- Music by: Carl W. Stalling
- Animation by: Charles Jones; Isadore Ellis
- Color process: Black and white
- Production company: Leon Schlesinger Productions
- Distributed by: Warner Bros. Productions; The Vitaphone Corporation
- Release date: May 21, 1938
- Running time: 7 min
- Country: United States
- Language: English

Injun Trouble is a 1938 American animated comedy short film directed by Robert Clampett. The short was released on May 21, 1938. It is the 102nd film in the Looney Tunes series and the 40th cartoon to feature Porky Pig. It was later remade in color in 1945 as Wagon Heels, also directed by Clampett.

== Plot ==
The United States only occupies the East Coast while the rest of the territory is occupied by Injun Joe's forces. Porky leads a wagon into the territory. He nevertheless sneaks in and finds the remnants of a Native American attack led by Joe. A hillbilly finds Porky and attempts to bait him with details that he is unwilling to disclose.

Injun Joe is shown as an extraordinarily strong person who can collapse a mountain and countless trees by walking into them. He scares a bear into cowering, offering him the tip of a mountain (which resembles shaved ice) as dessert before spitefully eating all of it. He steps on a bear trap and bites it into submission instead.

Porky finds a river, which he crosses after his horse removes a plug on a nearby drain. Joe spots the wagon from earlier and diverts the tracks, trapping the train as he assaults it while riding a log and using it as a bow. He swallows a mouthful of bullets and converts them into a warhead, which launches everything, including the scenery, into the air. Porky spots them and speeds to the location, only to be chased by Joe with an axe, who accidentally carves the Statue of Liberty and New York City in the process. The hillbilly then appears and reveals that Joe is ticklish, a fatal flaw which he exploits to force Joe into submission, despite the fact that Joe enjoys it.

== Home media ==
Injun Trouble is available on disc 2 of the Porky Pig 101 DVD set.

== See also ==
- Porky Pig filmography
- Looney Tunes and Merrie Melodies filmography (1930–1939)
