= Hobby Horse-Laffs =

1942 film by Norman McCabe

- Title card
- Directed by: Norman McCabe
- Story by: Melvin Millar
- Produced by: Leon Schlesinger
- Starring: Mel Blanc
- Music by: Carl W. Stalling
- Animation by: Cal Dalton
- Color process: Black and white
- Production company: Leon Schlesinger Productions
- Distributed by: Warner Bros. Pictures
- Release date: June 6, 1942
- Running time: 6 min
- Country: United States
- Language: English

Hobby Horse-Laffs is a 1942 American animated comedy short film directed by Norman McCabe. The cartoon was released on June 6, 1942. It is part of the Looney Tunes series.

The film

== Plot ==
The cartoon is a series of unrelated gags involving hobbies.

A boat enthusiast happens to be imitating Napoleon. A botanist giving fertilizer to his potted plant is interrupted by the narrator's questions, only to be lifted to the air by the rapidly growing plant. Another botanist who grows cactuses is pricked as he walks in his garden. A bodybuilder eats only raw carrots, which gives him iron-hard muscles and rabbit ears.

A magician attempts to make a goldfish disappear, but switches place with it instead much to his chagrin. A man imitates music instruments and manages to combine his voices into an orchestra, only to reveal that he cheated with a record player. A man wrangles his large dog and has his pants mauled. A pilot teaches others how to fly with only their hands. A man who is obsessed with hotel towels and dishes is imprisoned for theft.

A man invents a series of impractical novelty products, including a donut which soaks up coffee via a retractable opening which proves to be unstable once he takes a bite, as well as a shoe which prevents a hot foot prank by extinguishing the lit match. A U.S. Post employee who is an explosive enthusiast happens to deliver mail to his own address, only to accidentally blow up his house. An inventor invents a gadget which gives nosy men black eyes for attempting to read his newspaper.

== See also ==
- Looney Tunes and Merrie Melodies filmography (1940–1949)
- List of animated films in the public domain in the United States
