= The Timid Toreador =

1940 film by Robert Clampett and Norman McCabe

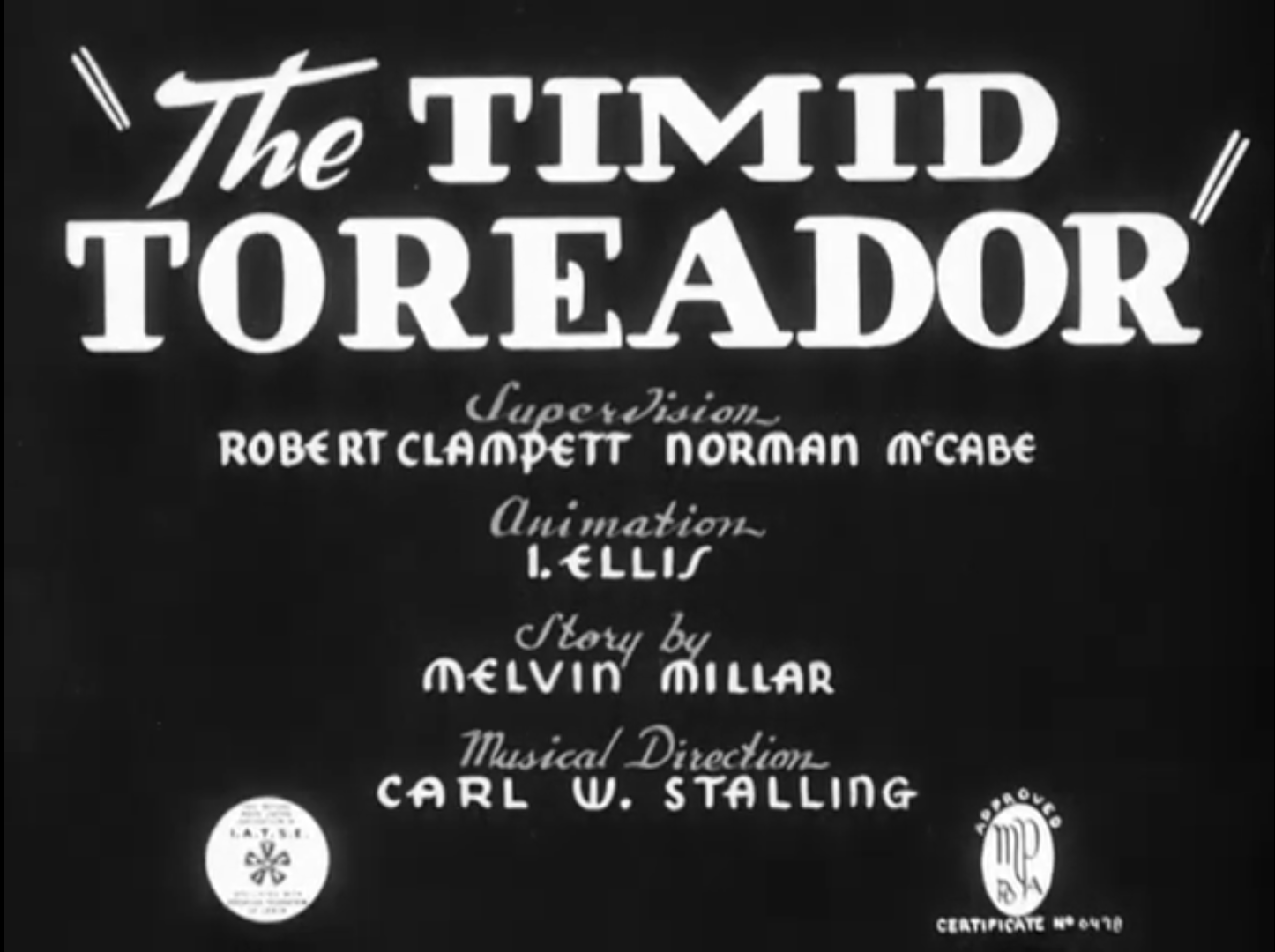
- Title card
- Directed by: Robert Clampett; Norman McCabe
- Story by: Melvin Millar
- Produced by: Leon Schlesinger
- Starring: Mel Blanc
- Music by: Carl W. Stalling
- Animation by: Isadore Ellis
- Color process: Black-and-white
- Production company: Leon Schlesinger Productions
- Distributed by: Warner Bros. Pictures
- Release date: December 21, 1940
- Running time: 7 minutes
- Country: United States
- Language: English

The Timid Toreador is a 1940 American animated comedy short film directed by Robert Clampett and Norman McCabe. The short was released on December 21, 1940. It is part of the Looney Tunes series, the 82nd cartoon to feature Porky Pig and the first cartoon to be directed by McCabe, who would succeed Clampett after Clampett took over Tex Avery's unit.

== Plot ==
The scene descends upon a small Mexican town, where a large woman intensely washes a union suit (and the suit returns the favor) in a public fountain, while a mariachi band performs "La Cucaracha" outside the Brown Sombrero. Porky Pig is selling tamales that are so hot, a nearby bird that steals one promptly explodes and is roasted.

At the local stadium, the townspeople gather to watch a hotly anticipated bullfight pitting matador Ponchi Pancho against Slapsie Maxie Rosenbull (a spoof of "Slapsie" Maxie Rosenbloom), the Mexican Golden Gloves champion bull of 1940. Both humans and "contented cows" are excited to watch the fight. When the bell sounds, the matador flaps his cape and Slapsie charges into the matador. At first, Slapsie admires Ponchi's cape, but then takes it from him. Ponchi screams and runs away with Slapsie giving chase. Ponchi makes it over a bullseye fence and Slapsie hits it so hard that a mounted spectator in the ring laughs hysterically at him. An annoyed Slapsie chalks up his horn as though it were a pool cue ("Screwball in the side pocket") and charges into him, transforming the heckler and his horse into a centaur.

Porky arrives in the stadium and wanders into the ring, offering to sell Slapsie a tamale before realizing his customer and running away. After a brief chase, Slapsie blocks Porky's escape but is enticed by the smell of the tamales and offers to buy one, skeptical of its heat. As the tamale takes effect and burns Slapsie's innards, he panics and busts a hole through the stadium walls, stampeding away in pain. The spectators declare Porky champion and hero, lavishing him with hats; when a small derby lands on his head, his face instantly metamorphoses into a swinish caricature of Oliver Hardy.

== Home media ==
- LaserDisc - Longitude and Looneytude: Globetrotting Looney Tunes Favorites
- DVD - Porky Pig 101

== See also ==
- Porky Pig filmography
- Looney Tunes and Merrie Melodies filmography (1940–1949)
- List of animated films in the public domain in the United States
