= Who's Who in the Zoo =

1942 film by Norman McCabe

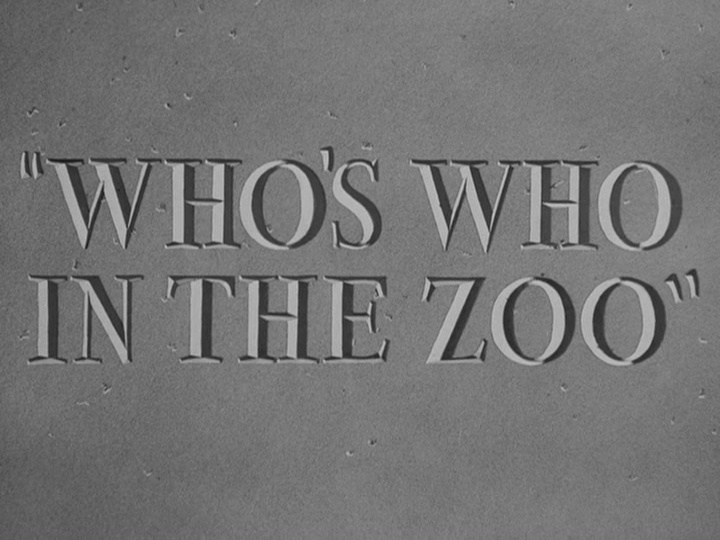
- Title card
- Directed by: Norman McCabe
- Story by: Melvin Millar
- Produced by: Leon Schlesinger
- Starring: Mel Blanc
- Music by: Carl W. Stalling
- Animation by: John Carey
- Color process: Black and white
- Production company: Leon Schlesinger Productions
- Distributed by: Warner Bros. Pictures
- Release date: February 14, 1942
- Running time: 7 min
- Country: United States
- Language: English

Who's Who in the Zoo is a 1942 American animated comedy short film directed by Norman McCabe. The short was released on February 14, 1942. It is part of the Looney Tunes series and the 97th cartoon to feature Porky Pig.

== Plot ==
Porky Pig works as the zookeeper of the Azusa Zoo. Outside of his occasional appearances, the film is a series of unrelated gags involving animals.

- In a comic "triple", a timber wolf is shown, then a gray wolf, then a "Hollywood wolf" (a frequent reference in the 1940s WB cartoons).
- Other creatures include a "missing lynx", a "tortoise and the hair", "March hares" who march to a drumbeat, a down-on-his-luck "bum steer", an "Indian" elephant (an elephant attired as an American Indian), and a bald eagle wearing a toupee.
- An Alaskan Bear who's known for hugging its prey to death picks up and starts hugging a defenseless sheep. When the narrator begs the bear to stop hugging the sheep, the sheep responds, in a feminine voice sounding like Sterling Holloway: "Oh, for goodness' sake, mind your own business!"
- A group of seals that the narrator says only eat fresh mountain trout. Porky attempts to feed them a mackerel instead, claiming it to be indistinguishable, but a seal plants a sign saying "No substitutes accepted".
- The famous Capistrano swallows are featured. The narrator asks them why they always go back to Capistrano, to which they, in unison, reply, "I dunno. I guess we're just in a rut."
- Some gags reference the then-ongoing World War II, including a black panther drinking cream from its dish, then noticing the dish is aluminum and throwing it into a scrap pile, a reference to the Salvage for Victory campaign; as well as a distressed rabbit father of dozens of babies given a note from the government to "increase your production 100%," as the song "What's The Matter with Father" plays in the background.
- A running gag about a lion who is awaiting the arrival of the ice cream truck, only to eat the ice cream man himself.

== Home media ==
Who's Who in the Zoo is available on disc 5 of the Porky Pig 101 DVD set.

== See also ==
- A Day at the Zoo
- Porky Pig filmography
- Looney Tunes and Merrie Melodies filmography (1940–1949)
- List of animated films in the public domain in the United States
