= Hop and Go =

1943 film by Norman McCabe

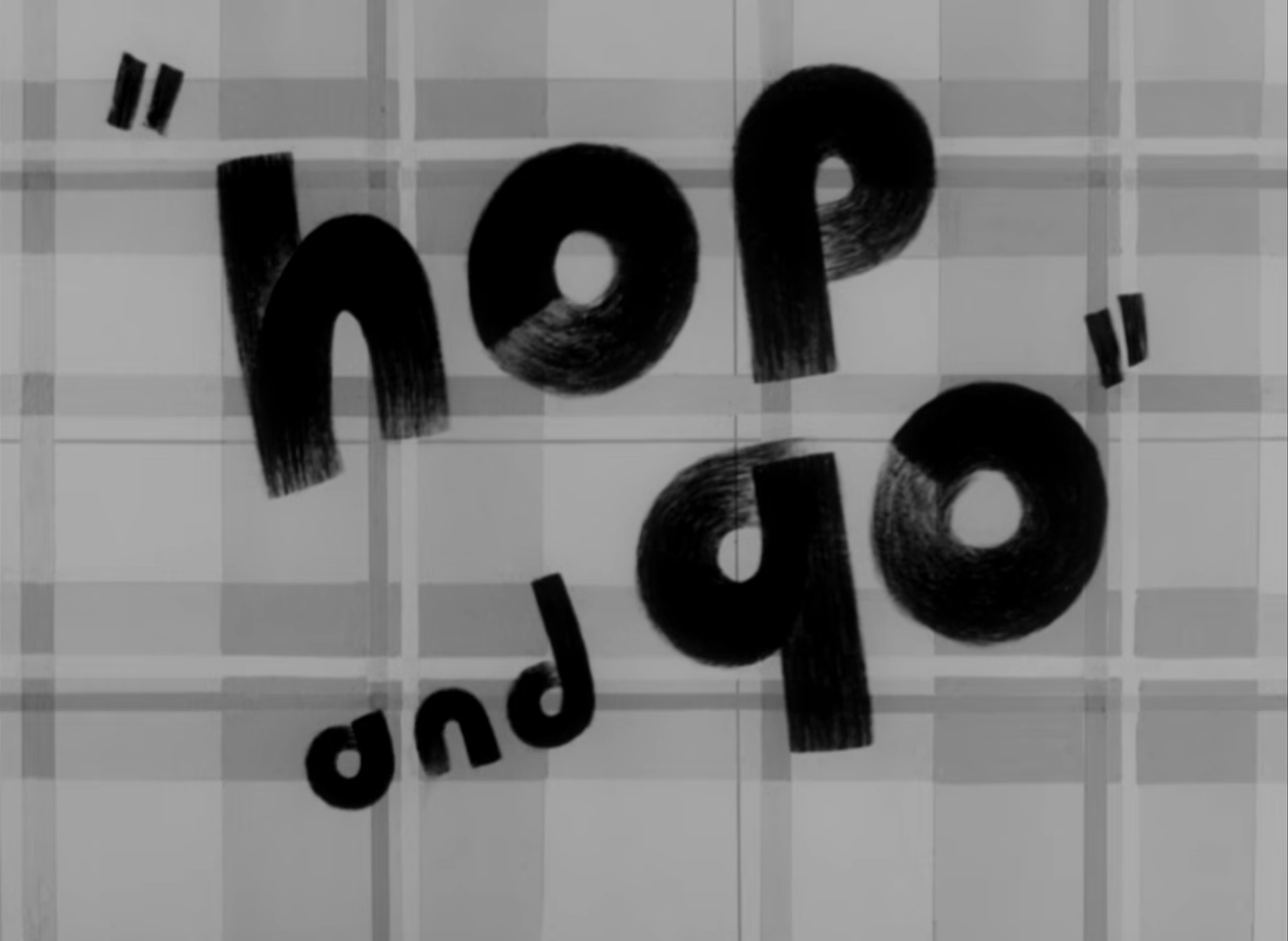
- Title card
- Directed by: Norman McCabe
- Story by: Melvin Millar
- Produced by: Leon Schlesinger
- Music by: Carl W. Stalling
- Animation by: Cal Dalton
- Color process: Black and white
- Production company: Leon Schlesinger Productions
- Distributed by: Warner Bros. Pictures
- Release date: March 27, 1943
- Running time: 7 min
- Country: United States
- Language: English

Hop and Go is a 1943 American animated comedy short film directed by Norman McCabe. It was released on March 27, 1943. It is part of the Looney Tunes series. It is infamous for being one in numerous non-Disney cartoons with Pinto Colvig's Goofy voice.

== Plot ==
Restored print from Looney Tunes Collector's Vault: Volume 2

A kangaroo named Claude Hopper claims to be a champion in hopping. As he is showboating, two Scottish rabbits decide to con him by claiming to teach him how to jump better, yet hinder his jumps for their own amusement. Claude does not realize the duo's trickery as he is too stupid and persistent to prove himself. This culminates into him being thrown into a landfill and almost drown. In the duo's final prank, Claude flies into the air, bouncing off a zeppelin into space and accidentally bombs Tokyo, doing the United States military a favor.

== Home media ==
This cartoon was first released as an unrestored extra on disc 2 of the Looney Tunes Golden Collection: Volume 6 DVD set, using an unreleased stereo mix of its audio track. The short was later released in a restored form on disc 2 of the Looney Tunes Collector's Vault: Volume 2 Blu-ray set, using the short's original mono audio track.
