= The Daffy Duckaroo =

1942 film by Norman McCabe

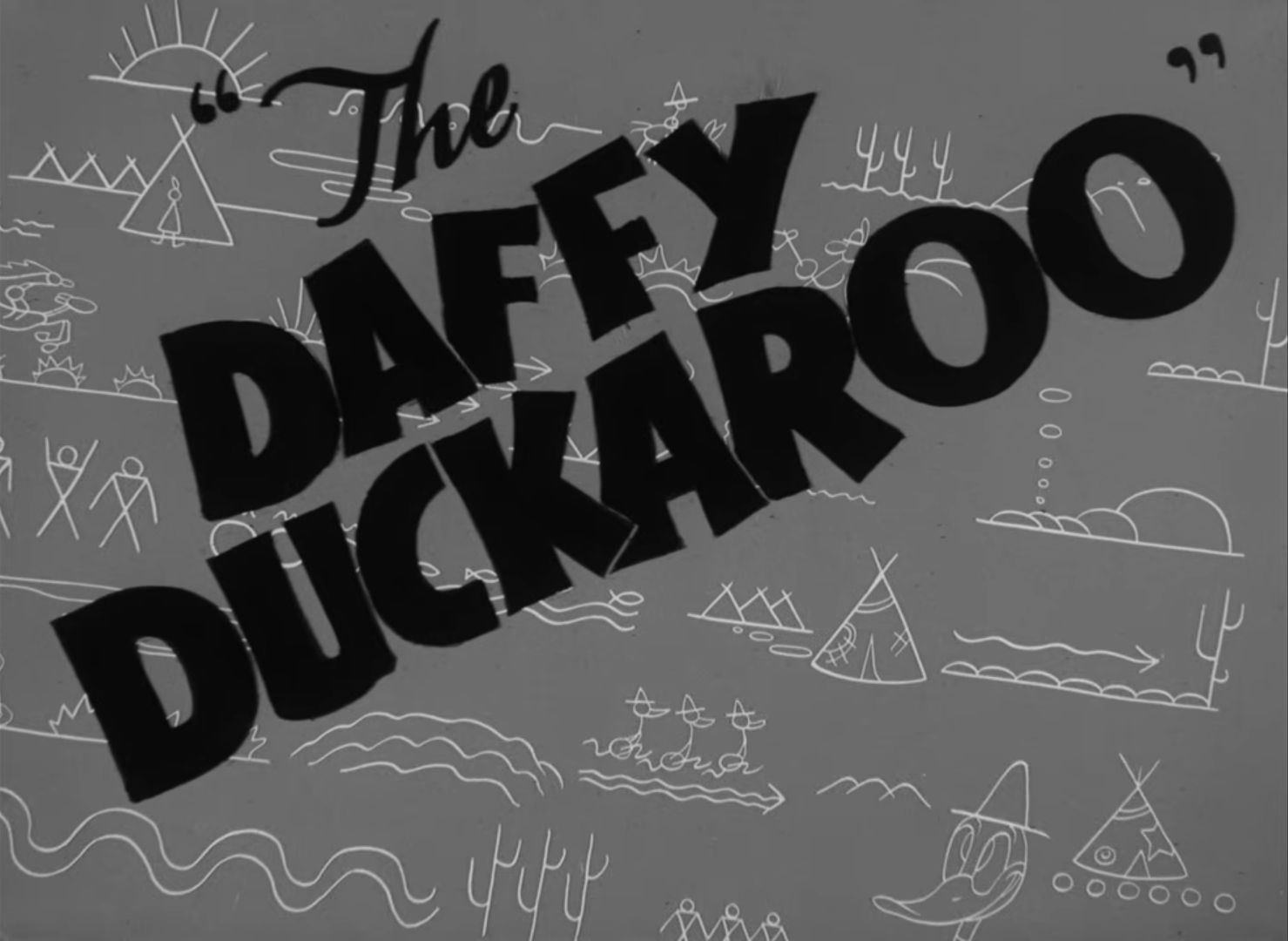
- Title card
- Directed by: Norman McCabe
- Story by: Melvin Millar
- Produced by: Leon Schlesinger
- Starring: Mel Blanc; Sara Berner
- Music by: Carl W. Stalling
- Animation by: Cal Dalton
- Color process: Black and white
- Production company: Leon Schlesinger Productions
- Distributed by: Warner Bros. Pictures
- Release date: October 24, 1942
- Running time: 7 min
- Country: United States
- Language: English

The Daffy Duckaroo is a 1942 American animated comedy short film directed by Norman McCabe. It was released on October 24, 1942. It is part of the Looney Tunes series and the seventeenth cartoon to feature Daffy Duck.

== Plot ==
On a donkey and pulling a trailer, recently retired singing cowboy Daffy Duckaroo moves from Hollywood to the American West, where he comes upon an Indian encampment. He is about to run away when he is wooed by an Indian girl. He serenades her and follows her into her teepee.

The Indian girl, actually a New Yorker named Daisy June, says she would love to be Daffy's girlfriend, but her boyfriend, a hulking Indian man named Little Beaver with a reputation for taking scalps, will never allow it. When Little Beaver arrives, Daffy hides in a dresser and emerges disguised as an Indian girl himself. Little Beaver quickly forgets Daisy June and falls for the costumed Daffy.

When Little Beaver discovers Daffy's ruse, he chases Daffy through the Painted Desert, the Petrified Forest and into Los Angeles until he calls for aid with smoke signals. The Indians surround Daffy's trailer, and in a non sequitur ending, they remove the tires and run off, only for an Indian to return them a few seconds later as they do not fit his golf cart; a sign reading "keep it under 40" is seen on the back of the cart.

== Voice cast ==
- Mel Blanc as Daffy Duck / Little Beaver / Horse / Native American
- Sara Berner as Daisy June

== Home media ==
- Blu-Ray 2026 - Looney Tunes Collector's Vault: Volume 2 (restored) - Warner Archive Collection

== See also ==
- Daffy Duck filmography
- Looney Tunes and Merrie Melodies filmography (1940–1949)
- List of animated films in the public domain in the United States

Preceded by The Impatient Patient	Daffy Duck Cartoons; 1942	Succeeded by My Favorite Duck
