= Porky's Snooze Reel =

1940 film by Robert Clampett and Norman McCabe

- Title card
- Directed by: Robert Clampett; Norman McCabe
- Story by: Warren Foster
- Produced by: Leon Schlesinger
- Starring: Mel Blanc
- Narrated by: Robert C. Bruce
- Music by: Carl W. Stalling
- Animation by: John Carey
- Color process: Black-and-white
- Production company: Leon Schlesinger Productions
- Distributed by: Warner Bros. Pictures
- Release date: January 11, 1941
- Running time: 7 minutes
- Country: United States
- Language: English

Porky's Snooze Reel is a 1941 American animated comedy short film directed by Robert Clampett and Norman McCabe. The short was released on January 11, 1941. It is part of the Looney Tunes series and the 83rd cartoon to feature Porky Pig.

== Plot ==
Porky Pig presents a newsreel produced by Passe News, a parody of Pathé.

In Postoffice, Pennsylvania, the Benevolent and Protective Order of Elks, depicted as literal anthropomorphic elks, stage a large parade. In Keglined, Kansas, Lew Lehr is depicted as a "tax expert" who recommends skipping income tax by not filing them, only to reveal him to be incarcerated for the same crime. A new battleship for the Swiss navy was revealed, only to sink immediately upon sailing.

In Pennsylvania once again, a dog show is organized. Porky narrates the segment and introduces absurd varieties of dogs in a parody of Lehr's narration of documentaries. In Wett, Washington, the town is so flooded the tallest inhabitant is barely able to have his head rise above the water; his diminutive wife is forced to hold her breath in the water much to her chagrin.

In a segment on national defense, a tank is depicted to be virtually indestructible and can navigate through a variety of terrain, only to be destroyed by a giant mousetrap. Elsewhere, a jellyfish eats a naval mine and is killed by the explosion, humorously turning into six flavors of jelly. Fighter planes vibrate their motor to the beat of "Aloha ʻOe". A pilot reluctantly flies a plane who has to flap its wings to stay afloat. Two planes literally engage in a dogfight by acting like dogs.

In Hollywood, California, a horse race occurs with the two leading racers having a literal photo finish at the last second. In Goon Lagoon, Florida, swimmers swim across a swamp, but are eaten by alligators who don their clothes. Porky ends the film by grinding a sausage at a meat grinder in a parody of the Paramount News newsreels.

== Home media ==
This short is available on disc 5 of the Porky Pig 101 DVD set.

== See also ==
- Porky Pig filmography
- Looney Tunes and Merrie Melodies filmography (1940–1949)
