= Detouring America =

1939 film by Fred Avery

- Title card
- Directed by: Fred Avery
- Story by: Jack Miller
- Produced by: Leon Schlesinger
- Starring: Mel Blanc
- Narrated by: Robert C. Bruce
- Music by: Carl W. Stalling
- Animation by: Rollin Hamilton
- Color process: Technicolor
- Production company: Leon Schlesinger Productions
- Distributed by: Warner Bros. Pictures
- Release dates: August 12, 1939 (Note: Archived from an August 17 article, this is based on the fact that new cartoon shorts would typically premiere in theaters on Saturdays.) (earliest known date)
- Running time: 8 min
- Country: United States
- Language: English

Detouring America is a 1939 American animated comedy short film directed by Fred Avery. The short was released as early as August 12, 1939. It is part of the Merrie Melodies series and the final film in the series to be animated by Rollin Hamilton, who returned to the studio at a freelance basis. It was nominated in the category Short Subject (Cartoon) at the 12th Academy Awards, but lost to Walt Disney Productions' The Ugly Duckling.

The scenes with the black hitchhiker and the Native American mother and son are excised from the cartoon when aired on Cartoon Network and Boomerang due to ethnic stereotyping against Native Americans and Inuit.

== Plot ==
The narrator narrates a series of unrelated gags during a tour of the United States. A human fly (simply a very experienced climber) climbs the Empire State Building, with reports on his progress appearing throughout the film. A military academy's students march with their legs in different positions. An oblivious scientist explores the Everglades and accidentally saves himself from a deadly illness by casually slapping a mosquito before it bites. A Texas cow-puncher who resembles Jerry Colonna literally punches a cow to the bewilderment of the narrator.

In Alaska, a poor, black hitchhiker at the North Pole sings "Carry Me Back to Ol' Virginny" and is brought to Virginia by a passing Inuit. California redwoods are mercilessly chopped down to construct houses. At the Wyoming prairies, a prairie dog, depicted as an actual dog in a prairie, finds a tree with its peers. A prospector in California finds gold and requests that the audience keep a secret, only for other prospectors to arrive in a second. At a Native American reservation. a decrepit old man takes snake oil and somehow becomes more mobile by slithering like a snake. A woman carries her obese adult son, who is implied to have severe intellectual disabilities due to his infantile behavior. A snake dance is performed by literal snakes. An "old, reliable" geyser is only able to produce a single drop of water. A deer threatens a hunting lodge's owner. The human fly almost arrives at the top of the Empire State Building, only to reveal that his fear of heights helped him manage his climb as he struggles after the narrator's disruption.

== Home media ==
- LaserDisc – The Golden Age of Looney Tunes, Volume 5, Side 2 (USA 1995 Turner print)
- Blu-Ray/DVD – Each Dawn I Die (USA 1995 Turner print added as a bonus)
