= Daffy's Southern Exposure =

1942 film by Norman McCabe

- Title card
- Directed by: Norman McCabe
- Story by: Don Christensen
- Produced by: Leon Schlesinger
- Starring: Mel Blanc (uncredited)
- Music by: Carl W. Stalling
- Animation by: Vive Risto
- Color process: Black-and-white
- Production company: Leon Schlesinger Productions
- Distributed by: Warner Bros. Pictures
- Release date: May 2, 1942
- Running time: 7 minutes
- Country: United States
- Language: English

Daffy's Southern Exposure is a 1942 American animated comedy short film directed by Norman McCabe. The cartoon was released on May 2, 1942. It is part of the Looney Tunes series and the fifteenth cartoon to star Daffy Duck.

== Plot ==
Daffy Duck decides not to fly south for the winter, as he wants to "check up on this winter business" (gesturing to a newspaper he is reading, with a scantily-clad "snow queen" pictured). All the other ducks tell him "You'll be sorry!", and continue flying south.

Daffy initially marvels at the snow and ice that mark Winter's arrival, but as the conditions become progressively worse, he begins to starve and gets stranded in a snowstorm. He spots a log cabin, which he is overjoyed to find it has food. Little does he know, however, but it is the home of a fox and weasel. The former complains about how all they have to get them through the winter is a stockpile of beans, and that he would rather have steak, baked ham or even roast duck. It is at this point that they see Daffy. The two disguise themselves as kindly old ladies in order to keep him in their home (while singing a rendition of "The Latin Quarter"). They want Daffy for dinner, and so fatten him up by having him eat large portions of their stock of beans.

Once Daffy realizes their intentions, he quickly tries to escape, outwitting the weasel but not the fox. Daffy forces the fox to chase him up a tree so he can kick him down, then runs further south, past two signs pointing "SOUTH", and one more which reads "And we do mean SOUTH!"

Daffy ends up in South America. A samba dancer, who is a pastiche of Carmen Miranda, is seen singing in a nightclub, and Daffy is finally shown hiding in the dancer's fruit hat. Daffy, also wearing a fruit hat, emerges and says, "Si, si! I like the 'South' American Way. And I do mean SOUTH." Daffy winks at the audience before iris-out.

== Voice cast ==
- Mel Blanc as Daffy Duck / Fox / Ducks: "You'll Be SORRY!"
- Mina Farragut as Carmen Miranda dog
- Bob Clampett as "Beeyooop" vocal effect (archival audio from The Henpecked Duck)

== Home media ==
- VHS 2001 - Looney Tunes: The Collector's Edition, Vol. 15 - A Battle of Wits - Warner Home Video/Columbia House
- Blu-Ray 2023 - Looney Tunes Collector's Choice: Volume 2 (restored) - Warner Archive Collection

== See also ==
- Daffy Duck filmography
- Looney Tunes and Merrie Melodies filmography (1940–1949)
- List of animated films in the public domain in the United States

| Preceded by Conrad the Sailor | Daffy Duck Cartoons; 1942 | Succeeded by The Impatient Patient |
