= Porky's Road Race =

1937 film by Frank Tash

- Title card
- Directed by: Frank Tash
- Produced by: Leon Schlesinger
- Music by: Carl W. Stalling
- Animation by: Robert Bentley; Joe D'Igalo
- Color process: Black and white
- Production company: Leon Schlesinger Productions
- Distributed by: Warner Bros. Productions; The Vitaphone Corporation
- Release date: February 7, 1937
- Running time: 7 min
- Country: United States
- Language: English

Porky's Road Race is a 1937 American animated comedy short film directed by Frank Tash. Released on February 7, 1937, it is the 81st film in the Looney Tunes series and the nineteenth cartoon to feature Porky Pig.

== Plot ==
Porky Pig partakes in a road race, which promises a $2 million prize, though high tax rates mean the winner would only gain $1.63. He prepares his vehicle alongside caricatures of Stan Laurel, Oliver Hardy, Charlie Chaplin, W. C. Fields, Edna May Oliver, Greta Garbo and Charles Laughton, who interact with each other and their vehicles humorously. Borax Karoff, a caricature of Boris Karloff, prepares his extremely long black limousine.

The race starts with all racers bolting except for Stepin Fetchit, who uses "knee power" and crawls slowly. George Arliss, Leslie Howard and Freddie Bartholomew share a British vehicle, but are overtaken by W. C. Fields. John Barrymore is chased by his then-wife Elaine Barrie. Karoff attempts to sabotage the race with tacks, with Laughton catching them with a magnet, only for his vehicle to be destroyed by a torpedo. Oliver's vehicle is destroyed by the other racers. Clark Gable is ignored while hitchhiking. Karoff sabotages other vehicles with glue, including Porky's, who manages to skid away and fall into bricks, causing it to form a continuous track, which help him navigate through grease used by Karoff to sabotage other racers. The bricks hit Karoff on the head, and through a tunnel the two somehow swap vehicles to Karoff's chagrin. Karoff attempts to close a drawbridge as a last resort, only for Porky to be launched into the finish line. Karoff is knocked out but paramedics rescue the car instead. Porky is hailed the winner, only for the crown to be stolen by Oliver on the remains of her vehicle.

== Home media ==
The short was released on disc 2 of the Looney Tunes Golden Collection: Volume 3 DVD set, and on disc 1 of the Porky Pig 101 DVD set.

== See also ==
- Porky Pig filmography
- Looney Tunes and Merrie Melodies filmography (1930–1939)
