= Norman McCabe =

British-American animator (1911–2006)

- Born: Norman Hilderth McCabe; February 10, 1911; Newcastle upon Tyne, England, U.K.
- Died: January 17, 2006 (aged 94); Los Angeles, California, U.S.
- Years active: 1934–1999
- Spouse: Fern McCabe

Norman Hildreth McCabe (February 10, 1911 – January 17, 2006) was a British-American animator who enjoyed a long career that lasted into the 1990s.

== Early life and Warner Bros. ==
McCabe was born in England and raised in the United States. He worked in Tacoma, Washington, as a theater lobby artist. During the Great Depression, he moved to Los Angeles to look for work at lobbies, but to no avail. In the 1930s, he joined Leon Schlesinger Productions (which produced cartoons for Warner Bros. Pictures) as an animator in Frank Tashlin's unit. He moved over to Bob Clampett's unit in 1938 where he animated and/or co-directed several classic black and white Looney Tunes. When Tex Avery left Schlesinger in 1941, Clampett took over Avery's unit and McCabe took over Clampett's old unit. In 1943, McCabe was drafted into the United States Army and was assigned to the Army Air Corps Training Film Unit (Tashlin took over McCabe's unit after McCabe's final cartoon). In his final Warner cartoon before he left (a black-and-white propaganda cartoon called Tokio Jokio), he was billed as "Cpl. Norman McCabe".

He served in the First Motion Picture Unit, headquartered at the Hal Roach Studios. His commanding officer was major Rudolf Ising.

== Post-World War II ==
After the war, McCabe worked on commercial illustrations for such works as the Bozo the Clown children's storybook records and educational films.

In the 1950s, McCabe found himself working for various television commercial studios such as Swift-Chaplin Productions, Five Star Productions, FilmFair, and TeleMation Inc. He worked as an animation director for All Scope Pictures, Inc., a commercial film division for 20th Century Fox from 1958 until the early 1960s.

He returned to animation in 1963, joining DePatie–Freleng Enterprises, where he worked on the titles for the feature film The Pink Panther. McCabe animated at DePatie–Freleng, working on Pink Panther cartoons as well as Warner Bros. cartoons. He also directed made for TV cartoons at DePatie–Freleng. During that time, he was usually credited as "Norm McCabe".

McCabe moved to the Filmation animation studio in 1967 working on several Saturday-morning cartoon series. He returned to theatrical animation with the adult animated feature film Fritz the Cat in 1972 before returning to DePatie-Freleng where he animated until the end of the 1970s. An in-joke at the studio had the name of a villain in The Houndcats as being "McCabe".

Other studios McCabe worked for include Film Roman (Bobby's World), Hanna-Barbera, Henson Associates (Muppet Babies), Murakami-Wolf-Swenson (Teenage Muntant Ninja Turtles), Pacific Title & Art Studio, Pantomime Pictures (Skyhawks), Playhouse Pictures, Ruby-Spears, Sunbow Productions, and Universal Animation Studios.

In the 1980s, McCabe returned to Warner Bros. where he worked on new animation for Warner cartoon feature film anthologies. He also trained a new generation of animators in working with the classic Warner cartoon characters. His last job was as a sheet timer on the series Tiny Toon Adventures, Taz-Mania, Animaniacs, Freakazoid!, and The Sylvester & Tweety Mysteries.

== Death ==
McCabe died in January 2006, a month before his 95th birthday and he was the last surviving director from the golden age of Warner Bros. Cartoons to die.

== Legacy ==
McCabe's work is obscure today, because he never made color cartoons during his (relatively brief) directorial tenure at the Schlesinger studio, and several of his cartoons would now be considered offensive due to heavy racial stereotyping (particularly true in his World War II propaganda cartoons, such as The Ducktators, Confusions of a Nutzy Spy, and Tokio Jokio, which satirize Adolf Hitler, Benito Mussolini and/or Hideki Tojo, alongside broadly caricatured versions of Japanese soldiers). During a screening of his cartoons at ASIFA-Hollywood, he spoke highly of Clampett, but was outright embarrassed by his old black-and-white cartoons. However, he won recognition and accolades from those in the animation business.

== Filmography ==
=== Film ===
Year	Series	Title	Credits
1934	Merrie Melodies	Goin' to Heaven on a Mule	animator
1934	Merrie Melodies	How Do I Know It's Sunday	animator
1935	Looney Tunes	Buddy's Theatre	animator
1935	Looney Tunes	Buddy's Pony Express	animator
1935	Looney Tunes	Buddy's Lost World	animator
1936	Looney Tunes	The Phantom Ship	animator
1936	Looney Tunes	Boom Boom	animator
1936	Looney Tunes	Alpine Antics	animator
1936	Looney Tunes	Westward Whoa	animator
1936	Looney Tunes	Fish Tales	animator
1936	Looney Tunes	Shanghaied Shipmates	animator
1936	Looney Tunes	Porky's Pet	animator
1936	Looney Tunes	Porky's Poultry Plant	animator
1936	Looney Tunes	Little Beau Porky	animator
1936	Looney Tunes	Porky in the North Woods	animator
1937	Looney Tunes	Porky's Road Race	animator
1937	Looney Tunes	Porky's Romance	animator
1937	Looney Tunes	Porky's Building	animator
1937	Looney Tunes	Get Rich Quick Porky	animator
1938	Looney Tunes	Porky's Party	animator
1938	Looney Tunes	Porky in Wackyland	animator
1938	Looney Tunes	Porky in Egypt	animator
1938	Looney Tunes	The Daffy Doc	animator
1939	Looney Tunes	Porky's Tire Trouble	animator
1939	Looney Tunes	Kristopher Kolumbus Jr.	animator
1939	Looney Tunes	Scalp Trouble	animator
1939	Looney Tunes	Porky's Hotel	animator
1939	Looney Tunes	The Film Fan	animator
1940	Looney Tunes	The Timid Toreador	director
1941	Looney Tunes	Porky's Snooze Reel	director
1941	Looney Tunes	Robinson Crusoe, Jr.	director
1942	Looney Tunes	Who's Who in the Zoo	director
1942	Looney Tunes	Daffy's Southern Exposure	director
1942	Looney Tunes	Hobby Horse-Laffs	director
1942	Looney Tunes	Gopher Goofy	director
1942	Looney Tunes	The Ducktators	director
1942	Looney Tunes	The Impatient Patient	director
1942	Looney Tunes	The Daffy Duckaroo	director
1943	Looney Tunes	Confusions of a Nutzy Spy	director
1943	Looney Tunes	Hop and Go	director
1943	Looney Tunes	Tokio Jokio	director
1946	J. Waldo	Honesty Is The Best Policy	director and animatior
1964	Looney Tunes	Pancho's Hideaway	animator
1964	The Pink Panther	The Pink Phink	animator
1964	The Pink Panther	Pink Pajamas	animator
1964	Merrie Melodies	Road to Andalay	animator
1965	Looney Tunes	It's Nice to Have a Mouse Around the House	animator
1965	Merrie Melodies	Cats and Bruises	animator
1965	The Pink Panther	We Give Pink Stamps	animator
1965	Merrie Melodies	The Wild Chase	animator
1965	The Pink Panther	Dial "P" for Pink	animator
1965	The Pink Panther	Moby Duck	animator
1965	The Pink Panther	Sink Pink	animator
1965	Merrie Melodies	Assault and Peppered	animator
1965	The Pink Panther	Pickled Pink	animator
1965	The Pink Panther	Pinkfinger	animator
1965	The Pink Panther	Shocking Pink	animator
1965	Looney Tunes	Well Worn Daffy	animator
1965	The Pink Panther	Pink Ice	animator
1965	Merrie Melodies	Rushing Roulette	animator
1965	The Pink Panther	The Pink Tail Fly	animator
1965	The Pink Panther	Pink Panzer	animator
1965	The Pink Panther	An Ounce of Pink	animator
1965	The Pink Panther	Reel Pink	animator
1965	The Pink Panther	Bully for Pink	animator
1965	The Inspector	The Great De Gaulle Stone Operation	animator
1966	Looney Tunes	The Astroduck	animator
1966	The Inspector	Reaux, Reaux, Reaux Your Boat	animator
1966	The Inspector	Napoleon Blown-Aparte	animator
1966	The Pink Panther	Pink Punch	animator
1966	The Inspector	Cirrhosis of the Louvre	animator
1966	The Pink Panther	Pink Pistons	animator
1966	Looney Tunes	Daffy Rents	animator
1966	The Inspector	Plastered in Paris	animator
1966	The Pink Panther	Vitamin Pink	animator
1966	Looney Tunes	A-Haunting We Will Go	animator
1966	Merrie Melodies	Snow Excuse	animator
1966	The Pink Panther	The Pink Blueprint	animator
1966	The Pink Panther	Pink, Plunk, Plink	animator
1966	The Pink Panther	Smile Pretty, Say Pink	animator
1966	The Inspector	Cock-A-Doodle Deux Deux	animator
1966	The Pink Panther	Pink-A-Boo	animator
1966	Looney Tunes	A Squeak in the Deep	animator
1966	Merrie Melodies	Feather Finger	animator
1966	The Inspector	The Pique Poquette of Paris	animator
1966	The Inspector	Sicque! Sicque! Sicque!	animator
1966	Merrie Melodies	A Taste of Catnip	animator
1967	Merrie Melodies	Daffy's Diner	animator
1967	The Inspector	Sacré Bleu Cross	animator
1967	The Inspector	Le Quiet Squad	animator
1967	The Pink Panther	In the Pink	animator
1969	Looney Tunes	Fistic Mystic	animator
1969	Looney Tunes	Rabbit Stew and Rabbits Too!	animator
1969	Merrie Melodies	Shamrock and Roll	animator
1973	The Blue Racer	The Boa Friend	animator
1973	The Blue Racer	Wham and Eggs	animator
1973	The Blue Racer	Killarney Blarney	animator
1973	Hoot Kloot	The Shoe Must Go On	animator
1973	Hoot Kloot	Pay Your Buffalo Bill	animator
1973	Hoot Kloot	Stirrups and Hiccups	animator
1974	Hoot Kloot	Phony Express	animator
1974	Hoot Kloot	Giddy Up Woe	animator
1974	Hoot Kloot	Gold Struck	animator
1974	Hoot Kloot	As the Tumbleweeds Turn	animator
1974	The Pink Panther	Pink Aye	animator
1974	Hoot Kloot	Saddle Soap Opera	animator
1974	The Dogfather	The Dogfather	animator
1974	The Pink Panther	Trail of the Lonesome Pink	animator
1974	The Dogfather	Mother Dogfather	animator
1974	The Dogfather	Bows and Errors	animator
1974	The Dogfather	Deviled Yeggs	animator
1975	The Dogfather	Rock-A-Bye Maybe	animator
1975	The Dogfather	From Nags to Riches	animator
1975	The Pink Panther	Pink Streaker	animator
1975	The Pink Panther	Forty Pink Winks	animator
1975	The Dogfather	Goldilox & the Three Hoods	animator
1975	The Pink Panther	Keep Our Forests Pink	animator
1975	The Pink Panther	Pink Campaign	animator
1976	The Pink Panther	Mystic Pink	animator
1976	The Pink Panther	The Pink Pro	animator
1976	The Dogfather	Medicur	animator
1976	The Pink Panther	Pinky Doodle	animator
1977	The Pink Panther	Therapeutic Pink	animator
1978	The Pink Panther	String Along in Pink	animator
1978	The Pink Panther	Pink Lemonade	animator
1978	The Pink Panther	Pink Trumpet	animator
1978	The Pink Panther	Yankee Doodle Pink	animator

=== Feature films ===
Year	Title	Credits
1972	Fritz the Cat	animator
1982	Bugs Bunny's 3rd Movie: 1001 Rabbit Tales	animator
1983	Daffy Duck's Fantastic Island	animator
1986	The Transformers: The Movie	animation director
1988	Daffy Duck's Quackbusters	animator

=== Television ===
Year	Title	Credits	Notes
1972	Clerow Wilson and the Miracle of P.S. 14	animator	TV special
1972	The Barkleys	animator	3 episodes
1973	The Bear Who Slept Through Christmas	animator	TV special
1974	The Magical Mystery Trip Through Little Red's Head	animator	TV special
1975	The Hoober-Bloob Highway	animator	TV special
1977	Bugs Bunny's Easter Special	animator	TV special
1978	Michel's Mixed-Up Musical Bird	animator	TV special
1978	Bugs Bunny's Howl-oween Special	animator	TV special
1979	The Bugs Bunny Mother's Day Special	animator	TV special
1979	Bugs Bunny's Thanksgiving Diet	animator	TV special
1980	The Trouble with Miss Switch	animator	TV special
1980	Pontoffel Pock, Where Are You?	animator	TV special
1981	The Pink Panther in: Pink at First Sight	animator	TV special
1981	A Chipmunk Christmas	animator	TV special
1982	Bugs Bunny's Mad World of Television	animator	TV special
1982	The Grinch Grinches the Cat in the Hat	animator	TV special
1986-1987	My Little Pony	director	
1990-1991	Tiny Toon Adventures	director/timing director	

== Sources ==
- Sigall, Martha (2005). "The Boys of Termite Terrace". Living Life Inside the Lines: Tales from the Golden Age of Animation. University Press of Mississippi. ISBN 9781578067497.
