= Stereotypes of Japanese people =

Portrayal of Japanese people in other cultures

Stereotypes of Japanese people include real or imagined characteristics of Japanese people used by people who see them as a single and homogenous group. Many of these stereotypes overlap with generic East Asian stereotypes.

== Common stereotypes ==
=== Shyness and politeness ===
Japanese people are often depicted as being shy or quiet, particularly when traveling abroad. Historically, being calm and quiet has been viewed as a virtue in Japan since the samurai period. Politeness is also a major part of Japanese culture. The Japanese language contains two types of honorific expressions: one to show respect and one to show modesty. Japanese people often go to extreme lengths to avoid conflict and very rarely reject an idea out loud, as doing so is seen as extremely uncouth. Bowing in Japan is well known around the world and is used daily in different contexts as a greeting, to show reverence or gratitude, and to apologise.

=== Food ===
Sushi is an iconic example of Japanese cuisine. Many foreigners assume Japanese people consume sushi on a regular basis, when it is actually often reserved for special occasions. Japan is one of the few countries that continues to practice commercial whaling, leading to Japanese people often being stereotyped as eating whale meat and dolphin meat.

=== Media ===
Japanese media is known for being dark, violent, and surreal. Famous types of Japanese media include anime, manga, kaiju films (perhaps most notably featuring Godzilla), and Japanese game shows. These game shows have a reputation for being surreal and needlessly cruel to contestants, and were parodied in the U.S. by the Saturday Night Live sketch "Quiz Kings" (1994) and The Simpsons episode "Thirty Minutes over Tokyo" (1999). The U.S. television network ABC also produced a series called I Survived a Japanese Game Show (2008–2009). In addition, Japanese people are often ridiculed for enjoying tentacle erotica due to its prevalence in hentai.

=== Kawaii ===
Kawaii (cuteness culture) has become a prominent subculture in Japan, demonstrated in certain genres of anime, manga, handwriting, clothing, personal appearance, and mascots such as Hello Kitty. Cuteness has been adopted as part of Japanese culture and national identity.

=== Technology ===
Japan is often stereotyped as being technologically advanced; Japanese robotics are world leaders in the robotics industry. It is also widely believed by foreigners that Japanese toilets, which feature heated seats and electronic bidets, are the most advanced in the world.

== See also ==
- Stereotypes of East and Southeast Asians in the United States
