= Don R. Christensen =

American cartoonist (1916–2006)

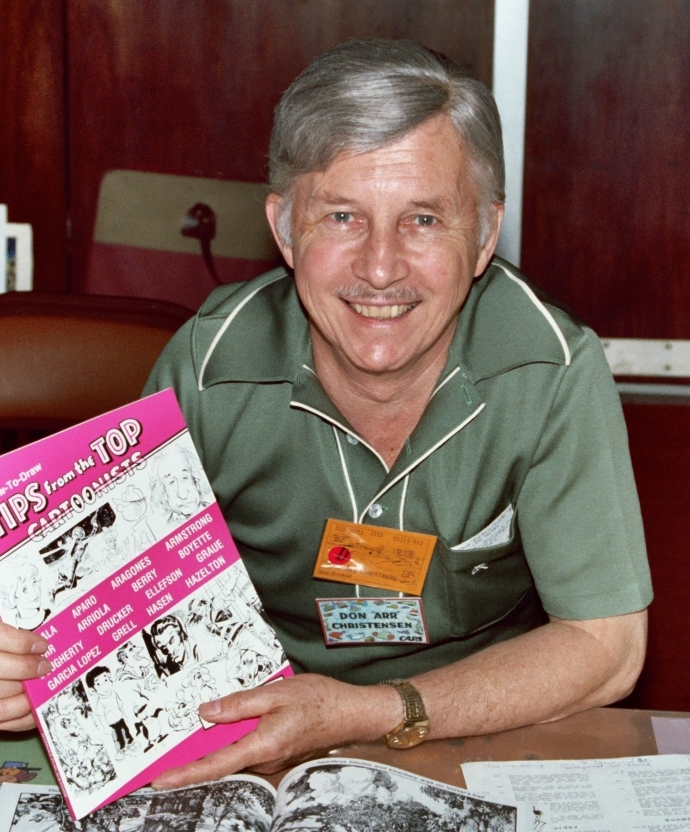
- Christensen at the 1982 San Diego Comic Con
- Born: Donald Ragnvald Christensen; July 6, 1916; Minneapolis, Minnesota, U.S.
- Died: October 18, 2006 (aged 90); Las Vegas, Nevada, U.S.
- Other names: Don Arr; Don Arr Christensen
- Occupations: Animator, cartoonist, writer

Donald Ragnvald Christensen (July 6, 1916 – October 18, 2006) was an American animator, cartoonist, illustrator, writer and inventor. He was sometimes credited as "Don Arr".

== Biography ==
Christensen was a graduate of the Minnesota School of Art. After finishing school he worked for the art department of the Minneapolis Journal, and then the Walt Disney Productions from 1937 to 1941. He left the studio after the 1941 Disney animators' strike, during which he met his wife-to-be, Ivy-Carol Van Horn. Christensen then worked briefly at Leon Schlesinger Productions, primarily as a storyboard artist for Norman McCabe's unit. Christensen left the studio after McCabe left for the military. He worked independently for nearly four decades as a storyboard writer and artist, primarily for Western Publishing, Dell and Gold Key comic books, as well as Hanna-Barbera, Walter Lantz Productions, Filmation, DePatie–Freleng Enterprises. He wrote and provided illustrations for such comic book titles as Magnus, Robot Fighter, Donald Duck, and Uncle Scrooge. He was a member of the Southern California Comic Artist Professionals Society, and was a past President of the Comic Art Professional Society.

Christensen died on October 18, 2006, at the age of 90. He beat the odds that he would not survive past 40, having been a Type I diabetic since the age of 13.
