= Isadore Ellis =

American animator (1910–1994)

I. Ellis
- Born: Isadore Howard Ellis; January 19, 1910
- Died: April 26, 1994 (aged 84)
- Other names: Izzy Ellis; Iz Ellis
- Occupation: animator
- Years active: 1935-1980
- Employer(s): Animated Pictures (1935-37); Warner Bros. Cartoons (1937-1948); Larry Harmon Pictures (1958-1959); Famous Studios/Gerald Ray Studios (1960-1967); United Productions of America (1960-1961); Leonardo Productions (1960-1969); Grantray-Lawrence Animation/Krantz Films (1966-1967); Hanna-Barbera (1968-1980)

Isadore Howard Ellis (January 19, 1910 – April 26, 1994) was an American animator best known for working for Warner Bros. Cartoons under the Bob Clampett and Frank Tashlin units. He was credited as I. Ellis.

== Career ==
Ellis had a long career in the animation industry, which started at Ub Iwerks Studio in 1935. After two years, Ellis moved to Leon Schlesinger Productions, where he worked under Bob Clampett's unit. Earlier in his life, like Clampett, he worked for the supplement of The Los Angeles Times called The Junior Times in the late 1920s. After Clampett took over Tex Avery's unit, Ellis continued to animate in his old unit under the supervision of Norman McCabe, Frank Tashlin, and Robert McKimson. Ellis reunited with Clampett after McKimson took over Tashlin's unit. However, Ellis relocated to McKimson's unit after Art Davis took over the Clampett unit. In 1948, Ellis left to do commercial work.

In the 1960s, Ellis worked for several animation studios for television. He worked for Gerald Ray Studios, which at the time was contracted in co-produce the Popeye the Sailor television series. He also worked for Leonardo Productions, UPA and Krantz Films until finally moving to Hanna-Barbera Productions in 1968, where he would spend the next twelve years animating.

Ellis died on April 26, 1994, at the age of 84.
