= Wrath of the Black Manta =

1989 video game

Ninja Cop Saizou Wrath of the Black Manta
- North American cover art
- Developer: A.I
- Publishers: JP: Kyugo; NA/EU: Taito
- Platform: Famicom/NES
- Release: JP: November 17, 1989; NA: April 1990; EU: January 24, 1991
- Genre: Platform
- Mode: Single-player

Wrath of the Black Manta is a side-scrolling action game published by Taito for the Nintendo Entertainment System in North America in 1990 and in the PAL region in 1991. It is a localized version of Ninja Cop Saizou (忍者COPサイゾウ, Ninja Koppu Saizō), a Family Computer game developed by A.I and published by Kyugo in 1989, but with drastic changes to the game's graphics, soundtrack and level designs.

== Gameplay ==
In the game, the player goes through five levels, using throwing stars and special ninjutsu abilities called the "ninja arts", to stop a gang and the evil mastermind behind a slew of kidnappings, El Toro. Taro, a student of the Black Manta's sensei, is one of the kidnapped children.

The Black Manta has many powers, which he gets after beating a level. The player can choose which power to use by pressing start. These powers can help the Black Manta defeat enemies and bosses more quickly. The Black Manta can save kidnapped children hidden throughout each level, however, it plays no role in completing the game and does not warrant any kind of special bonus.

Part of the last level is seen through a first person perspective. Towards the end of this stage, the Black Manta has to defeat one of the bosses from the previous levels before he goes face-to-face with El Toro himself.

== Development ==
When Ninja Cop Saizou was localized for North America and Europe, all of the game's cut scenes were replaced with more realistic drawings. One of these particular cut-scene drawings was copied from How to Draw Comics the Marvel Way by Stan Lee and John Buscema. The image in question (the face of an evil-looking man with a mustache) is featured when interrogating an enemy in the first level.

The localization also included anti-drug messages instead of story dialogue where the kids were kidnapped for supposedly being from upper class families.

== Reception ==
Reception

Review score
Publication	Score
Electronic Gaming Monthly	6/10, 6/10, 6/10, 7/10
