= Nature Boy (disambiguation) =

"Nature Boy" is a song written by Eden Ahbez and later popularised by Nat King Cole, in 1948.

Nature Boy may also refer to:

== Arts, entertainment, and media ==
=== Fictional characters ===
- Nature Boy (comics), the title of a short-lived Charlton Comics superhero of the 1950s
- "Nature Boy", a character from the 1950 Bugs Bunny cartoon Bushy Hare
- "Ravishing Ronald The De-Natured Boy", a character from the 1951 Bugs Bunny cartoon Bunny Hugged

=== Music ===
==== Albums ====
- Nature Boy, a 2000 album by Jackie McLean
- Nature Boy: The Standards Album, a 2003 album by Aaron Neville

==== Songs ====
- "Nature Boy", a song by Nick Cave and the Bad Seeds from their album Abattoir Blues / The Lyre of Orpheus
- "Nature Boy", a song by Primus from their album Pork Soda

=== Other arts, entertainment, and media ===
- Nature Boy, a 2000 Canadian television movie directed by Kari Skogland, in which Callum Keith Rennie portrayed Eden Ahbez
- Nature Boy, a 2000 BBC television drama series directed by Joe Wright

== Social movement ==
- Nature boys or Naturemensch, a proto-hippie movement in California

== Wrestling ==
=== Mascot ===
- Nature Boy, a human male mascot who appeared on the Gorgeous Ladies of Wrestling

=== Wrestlers ===
- Buddy Rogers (wrestler) (1921–1992), an American professional wrestler
- Ric Flair (b. 1949), an American professional wrestler
- Buddy Landel (1961–2015), an American professional wrestler
- Roger Kirby (wrestler) (1939–2019), an American professional wrestler
- Scoot Andrews (b. 1971), an American indy wrestler best known as "The Black Nature Boy" Scoot Andrews
- Stan Lane (b. 1953), an American professional wrestler, who wrestled as "Nature Boy Stanley Lane"
- William Regal (b. 1968), a British professional wrestler, who wrestled as "Nature Boy Steven Regal"
