= Show Biz Bugs =

- Lobby card
- Directed by: Friz Freleng
- Story by: Warren Foster
- Starring: Mel Blanc
- Edited by: Treg Brown
- Music by: Milt Franklyn
- Animation by: Gerry Chiniquy; Arthur Davis; Virgil Ross
- Layouts by: Hawley Pratt
- Backgrounds by: Boris Gorelick
- Color process: Technicolor
- Production company: Warner Bros. Cartoons
- Distributed by: Warner Bros. Pictures; The Vitaphone Corporation
- Release date: November 2, 1957 (U.S.)
- Running time: 7:02
- Language: English

Show Biz Bugs is a 1957 Warner Bros. Looney Tunes animated short directed by Friz Freleng and featuring Mel Blanc. The short was released on November 2, 1957, and stars Bugs Bunny and Daffy Duck.

== Plot ==
Upon arriving at the theater where he and Bugs are performing, Daffy Duck is incensed to find Bugs' name on the marquee in considerably larger letters. The unseen manager justifies this by citing the relative drawing power of the performers. Further humiliated, Daffy discovers that his dressing room is a poorly disguised restroom.

That evening, Bugs and Daffy perform "Tea for Two" on stage. In the audience, watching the performance, can be seen a young Vice President Richard Nixon. Frustrated by Bugs' dominant applause, Daffy, convinced of his superior talent, attempts various solo acts to captivate the audience. Stripping to his cummerbund, bow tie, and gloves, he begins with a dance to "Jeepers Creepers", but fails to impress.

Daffy's subsequent pigeon act goes awry when the birds escape, forcing him to exit the stage in disgrace, only to be hit with a tomato. Bugs then performs a sawing-in-half trick, and Daffy volunteers, hoping to expose it as fake, but ends up literally sawed in half.

Daffy next sabotages Bugs' xylophone, rigging it to explode on a specific note. Bugs avoids the trap by deliberately playing the wrong note twice, prompting a frustrated Daffy to play the correct note himself, resulting in his own explosion.

In a final bid to outshine Bugs, Daffy, dressed in a red devil's costume, executes a perilous stunt: consuming gasoline, nitroglycerin, gunpowder, uranium-238, and a lit match, causing himself to explode. The audience applauds, and an impressed Bugs comments that they want more, but Daffy, now a ghost, replies that he can only perform the stunt once.

== Production ==
The basic setting and conflicts of Show Biz Bugs were reprised for the linking footage for the television series The Bugs Bunny Show. Show Biz Bugs was also re-worked as the climax of The Looney Looney Looney Bugs Bunny Movie (1981).

According to the audio commentary on the second Golden Collection set, the song "The Daughter of Rosie O'Grady" was intended to be used during the sequence where Daffy showcases some trained birds. A pre-score recording was produced, but was not used in the final cartoon. Other pre-score music included slightly longer versions of both "Tea for Two" and "Jeepers Creepers".

This would be the second to last Bugs Bunny and Daffy Duck cartoon Friz Freleng would direct with his musical methods and techniques (the final one would be Person to Bunny released in 1960; though Daffy did make a brief cameo in Apes of Wrath released in 1959 and was also directed by Freleng).

The xylophone gag was previously used in the Private Snafu short Booby Traps and the Bugs/Yosemite Sam short Ballot Box Bunny (and later in the Wile E. Coyote and the Road Runner cartoon Rushing Roulette), except in both cases the instrument used was a piano. The song used in each case, as in Show Biz Bugs, is "Believe Me, if All Those Endearing Young Charms".

The final act and the pigeon circus had been used in an earlier Porky Pig cartoon called Curtain Razor in which a fox does the same act Daffy does attempting to show Porky he is a star, and, on American television, much like Show Biz Bugs, the final act in Curtain Razor has been edited on Cartoon Network to remove him ingesting gasoline (the syndicated version of The Merrie Melodies Show also cuts the gasoline-drinking and edits it even further by cutting out the fox swallowing a match). The sequence also cut off him ingesting nitroglycerin and gunpowder, which those parts alongside the gasoline-drinking were replaced with a shot of Bugs looking at Daffy before cutting back to him drinking Uranium-238 and swallowing the lit-up match. The entire scene was left unedited in later airings in the 2010s and 2020s.

== Reception ==
In a commentary by Greg Ford, he cites that the short contains some of Warren Foster's "best gags as a writer". Ford also described it as "a definitive Bugs/Daffy showbiz rivalry cartoon".

Comic book writer Mark Evanier writes, "By 1957 there wasn't much about Daffy Duck that was daffy. He'd morphed into a greedy, self-obsessed rival to Bugs... and maybe the most psychotic property in the rarely stable Warner Bros. canon. Show Biz Bugs is enormously funny, though, as we watch him match Bugs Bunny in his self-inflicted destruction of both ego and body."

== Music ==
- "I'm Looking Over a Four Leaf Clover" by Harry M. Woods
- "Tea for Two" by Vincent Youmans
- "Jeepers Creepers" by Harry Warren
- "Believe Me, If All Those Endearing Young Charms" by Thomas Moore

== Home media ==
Show Biz Bugs is available on disc 4 of the Looney Tunes Golden Collection: Volume 2 DVD set, on disc 1 of The Essential Bugs Bunny DVD set, on disc 1 of the Looney Tunes Platinum Collection: Volume 2 Blu-ray and DVD sets, and on disc 3 of the Bugs Bunny 80th Anniversary Collection Blu-ray set. It also includes an audio commentary by historian Greg Ford along with a "Pre-Score" track that includes earlier versions of "Tea for Two" and "Jeepers Creepers" as well as a version of "The Daughter of Rosie O'Grady" (supposedly to underscore Daffy's "trained pigeons" act) that was ultimately unused. It is also available on the "A Salute to Friz Freleng" VHS, the Superior Duck VHS, and the "Looney Tunes: Curtain Calls" laserdisc.

== See also ==
- List of American films of 1957

Preceded by Bugsy and Mugsy	Bugs Bunny Cartoons; 1957	Succeeded by Rabbit Romeo
