= Doug Hazlewood =

American comic book artist

- Born: September 20, 1954 (age 72)
- Area: Inker
- Notable works: Marvel Try-out Book; Animal Man; Superboy; The Flash

Doug Hazlewood (born September 20, 1954) is an American comic book artist, known primarily for inking.

Hazlewood has primarily worked for DC Comics during his career, often partnering with pencilers Tom Grummett and Nicola Scott, and he occupies a particular niche as Superman's "event-book" inker, working on such titles and story lines as The Death of Superman (1993) and Superman: The Wedding Album (1996).

== Biography ==
Hazlewood came out of comics fandom, with one of his first published art credits being in FOOM #4 (1974), the last issue of that Marvel Comics-published fan magazine to be edited by Jim Steranko. His self-created character of Deathwatch was a submission to the character contest; it has not been established if the creators of the 1990s Marvel character Deathwatch were aware of this earlier usage of the name.

In 1979, he was published in the fanzine The Comic Reader. Up through the mid-1980s he had illustration work published sporadically in the Fantagraphics publications The Comics Journal and Amazing Heroes. In 1986, Hazlewood was named the winner of the inking portion of the Marvel Try-out Book, and from that point forward found regular professional inking work.

At first, Hazlewood worked with AC Comics on such titles as Femforce and Nightveil. Next, he inked the entire eight-issue run of Eclipse Comics' The Liberty Project.

Hazlewood latched on with DC Comics in 1988 as the regular inker for the new title Animal Man, written by Grant Morrison. Hazlewood remained as the book's inker for two years, up through issue #24. During this period, Hazlewood worked for the British company Fleetway, publisher of 2000 AD, as a cover inker for the title Psi-Judge Anderson.

In the early 1990s Hazlewood freelanced for Fleetway, Eclipse, and Marvel Comics, and in 1991 became the regular inker on DC's Adventures of Superman. Partnering with penciler Tom Grummett, Hazlewood inked that book until 1993. From there he and Grummett moved to Superboy vol. 3, which Hazlewood inked from 1994 to 1998.

Moving into the 2000s, Hazlewood was regular inker on The Flash vol. 2 from 2000 to 2003. From there, he moved to DC's Doom Patrol vol.4 (2004–2006), inking John Byrne for the book's entire 18-issue run. Next, Hazlewood collaborated with Nicola Scott on DC's Birds of Prey from 2007 to 2008, and then on Secret Six from 2008 to 2010. In 2010, writer Gail Simone from Secret Six, along with Scott, and Hazlewood, moved to Wonder Woman for a handful of issues, and in 2010 Scott and Hazlewood moved to Teen Titans vol. 3.

== Personal life ==
In the late 1980s/early 1990s, Hazlewood was based in Victoria, Texas.

Preceded by N/A	Animal Man inker 1988–1990	Succeeded by Mark Farmer
Preceded by Brett Breeding	Adventures of Superman inker 1991–1993	Succeeded by Ray McCarthy
Preceded by N/A	Superboy vol. 3 inker 1994–1998	Succeeded by Karl Kesel
Preceded by José Marzan, Jr.	The Flash vol. 2 inker 2000–2003	Succeeded by Alberto Dose
Preceded by Robin Riggs	Birds of Prey inker 2007–2008	Succeeded by John Floyd
Preceded by N/A	Secret Six inker 2008–2010	Succeeded by Jim Calafiore
