= Marvel Fireside Books =

Series of Marvel comics reprinted by Fireside Books

Marvel Fireside Books were a series of full-color trade paperbacks featuring Marvel Comics stories and characters co-published by Marvel and the Simon & Schuster division Fireside Books from 1974 to 1979. The first book, 1974's Origins of Marvel Comics, was very successful, and inspired a series of annual sequels.

These books enabled fans of the old comic books to have access to the stories without having to pay exorbitant prices for the original back issues. It introduced new readers to the work of Stan Lee, Jack Kirby, Steve Ditko, and other Marvel creators, and packaged the material in a traditional book format that carried more cachet than the flimsy pamphlet style of a typical comic book. Many of the books featured painted covers illustrated by such artists as Bob Larkin, John Romita Sr., and Earl Norem. In this way, the series was an antecedent to the now common practice of packaging "classic" stories into archival editions and trade paperback collections including Marvel's 1998 book Grandson of Origins of Marvel Comics.

== Publishing history ==
The Silver Surfer (1978), the only Marvel Fireside edition featuring original material. Cover art by Earl Norem.

Marvel Publisher Stan Lee came up with the idea of compiling the origins of some of their most popular characters in a book format similar to Jules Feiffer's 1965 book The Great Comic Book Heroes. Teaming up with Fireside, the paperback imprint of Simon & Schuster, Marvel initially produced Origins of Marvel Comics in 1974, featuring the origins of the Fantastic Four, the Hulk, Spider-Man, Thor, and Doctor Strange. Like the books to follow, Origins featured a foreword by Lee, and short introductions to each section, which followed the format of presenting the character's origin followed by a contemporary story by current Marvel contributors.

Origins of Marvel Comics was followed in 1975 with Son of Origins of Marvel Comics, featuring the origins of the X-Men, Iron Man, the Avengers, Daredevil, Nick Fury, the Watcher, and the Silver Surfer.

The two Origins books were followed by Bring on the Bad Guys, origins of a selection of Marvel villains; and The Superhero Women, featuring some of Marvel's most popular female superheroes. Eventually, the series moved away from origin stories and published collections of classic stories with individual characters such as Spider-Man, the Fantastic Four, the Hulk, Captain America, and Doctor Strange.

One of the Marvel Fireside Books superhero story editions was not a reprint but an original story. The Silver Surfer (1978) by Stan Lee, with art by Kirby and Joe Sinnott, was a new take on the late 1960s icon; and is considered by many to be one of the first true "graphic novels".

In conjunction with their reprint collections, Marvel and Fireside also produced a number of activity and game books by Owen McCarron, how-to books, and even a cookbook, again all featuring Marvel characters. The most well-known and popular book of this kind was 1978's How to Draw Comics the Marvel Way, which is still in print.

Marvel/Fireside published 24 different books, many with multiple printings in both hardcover and paperback.

== Original graphic novels ==
- The Silver Surfer: The Ultimate Cosmic Experience, 114 pages, September 1978, ISBN 978-0671242251

== Reprint collections ==
- Origins of Marvel Comics collects Fantastic Four #1 and #55, The Incredible Hulk #1 and #118, Amazing Fantasy #15, The Amazing Spider-Man #72, Journey into Mystery #83, Thor #143, and Strange Tales #110, #115, and #155, 254 pages, September 1974, ISBN 978-0671218638
- Son of Origins of Marvel Comics collects X-Men #1, Tales of Suspense #39 and #97, The Avengers #1, Daredevil #1 and #47, Strange Tales #135, and The Silver Surfer #1, 249 pages, October 1975, ISBN 978-0671221669
- Bring on the Bad Guys: Origins of the Marvel Comics Villains collects Fantastic Four #5, Fantastic Four Annual #2, Strange Tales #126–127, Journey into Mystery #112–113, and 115, Tales of Suspense #66–68, The Amazing Spider-Man #40, Tales to Astonish #90–91, and The Silver Surfer #3, 253 pages, October 1976, ISBN 978-0671223557
- The Superhero Women: Featuring the Fabulous Females of Marvel Comics collects The Amazing Spider-Man #62 and #86, Marvel Feature vol. 2 #4, Fantastic Four #22, Ms. Marvel #1, Thor #189–190, The Cat #1, Tales to Astonish #44, Savage Tales #1, and Shanna the She-Devil #2, 254 pages, November 1977, ISBN 978-0671229283
- The Best of Spidey Super Stories collects Spidey Super Stories #2, 4, 9–10, 16, 18–19, and 22, 128 pages, January 1978, ISBN 9780671242206
- The Incredible Hulk collects The Incredible Hulk #3, Fantastic Four #12, The Avengers #3, Tales to Astonish #60–74 and #88, 253 pages, July 1978, ISBN 978-0671242244
- Marvel's Greatest Superhero Battles collects Fantastic Four #25–26, Daredevil #7, X-Men #3, The Silver Surfer #4, Tales of Suspense#79–80, Tales to Astonish #82, Strange Tales #139–141, and The Amazing Spider-Man #69, 253 pages, November 1978, ISBN 978-0671243913
- The Amazing Spider-Man collects The Amazing Spider-Man #42–43, 82, and 96–98, 128 pages, May 1979, ISBN 978-0671248130
- The Fantastic Four collects Fantastic Four #4, 48–50, and 87, 128 pages, September 1979, ISBN 978-0671248123
- Doctor Strange: Master of the Mystic Arts collects Strange Tales #111, 116, 119–120, 123, 131–133, The Amazing Spider-Man Annual #2, and Marvel Premiere #3, 132 pages, October 1979, ISBN 9780671248147
- Captain America: Sentinel of Liberty collects Captain America Comics #3, Tales of Suspense #59, 63, 79–81, The Avengers #4, and Captain America #110 and 122, 128 pages, October 1979, ISBN 978-0671252328

== Activity and how-to titles ==
- Lee, Stan (June 1976). The Mighty Marvel Superheroes Fun Book. Vol. 1. Simon & Schuster. ISBN 978-0671223106.; 128 pp.
- Lee, Stan; Picardo, Ann (September 1976). The Mighty Marvel Comics Strength and Fitness Book. Simon and Schuster. ISBN 978-0671223120.; 128 pp.
- Lee, Stan (June 1977). The Mighty Marvel Superheroes Fun Book. Vol. 2. Touchstone. ISBN 978-0671227586.; 128 pp.
- The Mighty Marvel Superheroes Cookbook. September 1977. ISBN 978-0671225599.; 95 pp.
- How to Draw Comics the Marvel Way. December 1977. ISBN 978-0671530778.; 192 pp.
- The Mighty Marvel Fun Book. Vol. 3. July 1978. ISBN 978-0671242237.; 128 pp.
- Marvel Mazes to Drive You Mad. October 1978. ISBN 978-0671243388.
- The Mighty Marvel Pin-Up Book. November 1978. ISBN 978-0671243906.; 45 pp.
- Lee, Stan (January 1979). The Mighty Marvel Fun Book. Vol. 4. Touchstone. ISBN 9780671243890.
- The Mighty Marvel Fun Book. Vol. 5. October 1979. ISBN 9780671248154.
- Hovanec, Helene; Lee, Stan (August 1979). Marvel Word Games. Touchstone. ISBN 978-0671248086.
- The Mighty Marvel Jumbo Fun Book. 1979. ISBN 9780671248109.; 352 pp.

== See also ==
- Marvel Books
- Marvel Press
- Marvel Masterworks
- Marvel Premiere Classic
- The Official Marvel Try-Out Book
