= The Essential Bugs Bunny =

- DVD cover
- Directed by: Chuck Jones; Tex Avery; Bob Clampett; Friz Freleng; James Davis; Hal Geer; Greg Ford; Terry Lennon; Douglas McCarthy; Peter Shin; Bill Kopp; Phil Monroe
- Starring: Bugs Bunny; Mel Blanc (voice); Jeff Bergman (voice); Greg Burson (voice); Joe Alaskey (voice)
- Distributed by: Warner Home Video
- Release date: October 12, 2010 (United States)
- Running time: 235 minutes
- Country: United States
- Language: English

The Essential Bugs Bunny is a DVD set featuring cartoons focusing on Bugs Bunny. It was released on October 12, 2010.

== Contents ==
The contents are split over two discs. The first disc features 12 Bugs Bunny theatrical shorts which have all previously been released on the Looney Tunes Golden Collection sets, except for the restored version of A Wild Hare (which instead was previously released on the Warner Bros. Home Entertainment Academy Awards Animation Collection). Previous Golden Collections have had it unrestored as part of specials/documentaries in the bonus features. The second disc features TV specials, more recent shorts, a movie excerpt and a featurette.

=== Disc 1 ===
#	Title	Co-stars	Release date	Director	Series
1	Elmer's Candid Camera	Elmer	March 2, 1940	Chuck Jones	MM
2	A Wild Hare	Elmer	July 27, 1940	Tex Avery	MM
3	The Old Grey Hare	Elmer	October 28, 1944	Bob Clampett	MM
4	Baseball Bugs		February 2, 1946	Friz Freleng	LT
5	Hair-Raising Hare	Gossamer	May 25, 1946	Chuck Jones	MM
6	Haredevil Hare	Marvin, K-9	July 24, 1948	Chuck Jones	LT
7	8 Ball Bunny	Playboy Penguin	July 8, 1950	Chuck Jones	LT
8	Rabbit of Seville	Elmer	December 16, 1950	Chuck Jones	LT
9	Rabbit Fire	Daffy, Elmer	May 19, 1951	Chuck Jones	LT
10	Show Biz Bugs	Daffy	November 2, 1957	Friz Freleng	LT
11	Knighty Knight Bugs	Sam	August 23, 1958	Friz Freleng	LT
12	What's Opera, Doc?	Elmer	July 6, 1957	Chuck Jones	MM

=== Disc 2 ===
Title	Release date	Director	Type	Previous DVD release
My Dream Is Yours	April 16, 1949	Friz Freleng	excerpt from the movie	Looney Tunes Golden Collection: Volume 1
How Bugs Bunny Won the West	November 15, 1978	James Davis/Hal Geer	TV special	N/A
Bugs Bunny's Wild World of Sports	February 15, 1989	Greg Ford/Terry Lennon	TV special	N/A
Carrotblanca	August 25, 1995	Douglas McCarthy	short	Casablanca Two-Disc Special Edition
Hare and Loathing in Las Vegas	2004	Peter Shin/Bill Kopp	short	Australian edition of Looney Tunes: Back in Action
Ain't He a Stinker?	2010		documentary featurette	N/A
Bugs and Daffy's Carnival of the Animals	November 22, 1976	Chuck Jones	TV special	Looney Tunes Golden Collection: Volume 5
Invasion of the Bunny Snatchers (unedited)	December 31, 1992	Greg Ford/Terry Lennon	short	Space Jam Two-Disc Special Edition (was edited, is uncut here)
Bugs Bunny's Bustin' Out All Over	May 21, 1980	Chuck Jones/Phil Monroe	TV special	Looney Tunes Golden Collection: Volume 5

== Reception ==
In reviewing the set for The New York Times, Dan Barry praised the selection of shorts included on the first disc, though was more critical of the second disc, calling it a "wasted opportunity" as the inclusions were described as "later, lesser work" and wondering why those were chosen over classic shorts, such as Bugs and Thugs, and concluding that the Looney Tunes Golden Collection volumes provide a more complete repertoire for Bugs Bunny.
