= Invasion of the Bunny Snatchers =

1992 short directed by Greg Ford and Terry Lennon

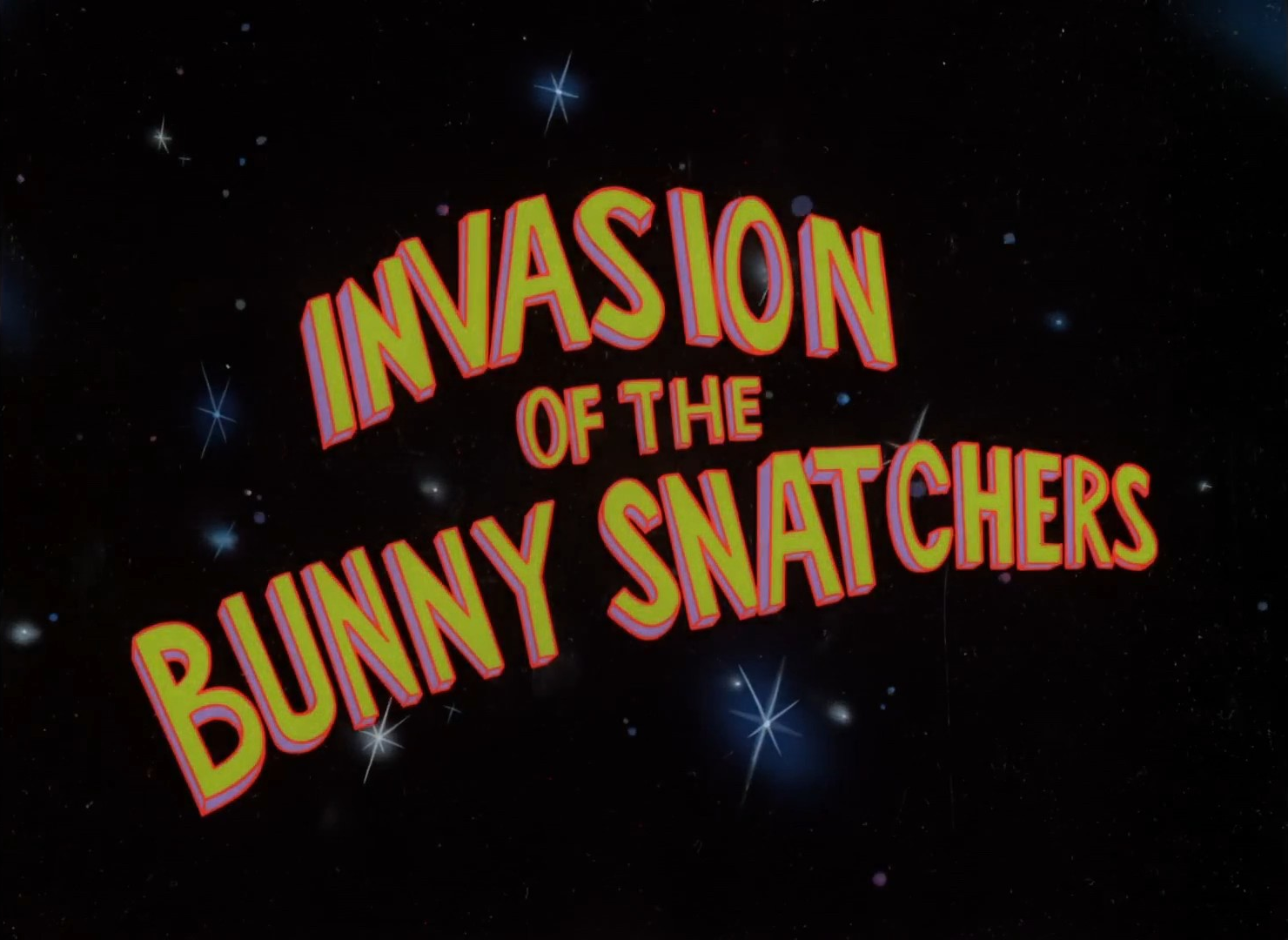
- Title card
- Directed by: Greg Ford; Terry Lennon
- Story by: Greg Ford; Terry Lennon; Ronnie Scheib (additional story dialogue)
- Produced by: Greg Ford
- Starring: Jeff Bergman; Russell Calabrese
- Music by: Carl Stalling (archival); Milt Franklyn (archival); Virg Dzurinko (additional music); Nomi Rosen (additional music)
- Animation by: Nancy Beiman; Doug Compton; Tom Decker; Russell Calabrese; Frank Gabriel; Nelson Rhodes; Larry Ruppel
- Layouts by: Owen Fitzgerald; Alan Bodner; Kevin Brownie
- Backgrounds by: Alan Bodner; Kevin Brownie; Larry Grossman; Patricia Keppler; Cotty Kilbanks; Kimball Miskoe; Bill Railley; Don Watson
- Color process: Technicolor
- Production company: Warner Bros. Animation
- Distributed by: Warner Bros. Pictures
- Release date: August 25, 1992 (USA)
- Running time: 11:30
- Language: English

Invasion of the Bunny Snatchers is a Bugs Bunny cartoon written and directed by Greg Ford and Terry Lennon and produced by Ford, released in 1992. The cartoon was intended for theatrical release, but eventually aired as part of the television special Bugs Bunny's Creature Features on CBS. Its premise is modeled after the 1956 film Invasion of the Body Snatchers, and it is considered subversive and a lampoon of cheaply drawn animation.

== Plot ==
Bugs Bunny finds himself facing a bizarre threat when peculiar carrots from outer space wreak havoc on Earth. As Bugs navigates his usual antics with Elmer Fudd, Yosemite Sam, and Daffy Duck, he encounters strange occurrences at each filming set. Initially ignoring the odd carrots, Bugs soon realizes they are linked to a sinister plot when his friends are replaced by poorly animated doppelgängers. These imposters pressure Bugs into consuming the glowing carrots, leading to a nightmarish encounter when a limited-animation clone of himself attempts to harm him. Refusing to let the story end there, Bugs embarks on a mission to defeat the clones and restore his friends.

Discovering the clones' origin on planet Nudnik, Bugs devises a plan to send them back into space using a rocket. After the clones are swallowed by a black hole, the original characters return, and Bugs reflects on their unique friendship, tinged with the daily threat of harm.

In a post credit scene, the typical "That's All, Folks!" signoff is done; however, Porky Pig is seen to have also been replaced, the line being delivered in a deliberately awkward tone by a robotic clone of Porky animated in a style similar to that used by Terry Gilliam; upon realizing he missed the clone, Bugs suddenly walks in, punts the clone Porky out of frame, and puts the regular Porky, who delivers the line in his typical style, in his place.

== Voice cast ==
- Jeff Bergman as Bugs Bunny, Daffy Duck, Elmer Fudd, Yosemite Sam, and Porky Pig
- Russell Calabrese as the Black Hole and vocal effects

== Production ==
Invasion of the Bunny Snatchers was produced at a time when newer Looney Tunes shorts were being released to introduce Warner Bros.' cartoon characters to a modern generation — a process that was, thanks to the tepid reception of 2003's Looney Tunes: Back in Action, eventually discontinued for some time from 2004 to 2009. Greg Ford and Terry Lennon developed the short's story and recorded a scratch track with Jeff Bergman providing the voices, but the studio changed priorities and the team worked on three compilation specials: Bugs Bunny's Wild World of Sports in 1989, Happy Birthday Bugs: 50 Looney Years in 1990, and Bugs Bunny's Overtures to Disaster in 1991. The doppelgängers' friendly personalities (except the Bugs Bunny clone) were done as an even more critical jab toward the executives at Warner Bros. Animation for their handling of the characters at the time (marketing them in the vein of Disney) than Ford and Lennon's previous Bugs Bunny cartoon, (Blooper) Bunny. The clones' limited animation (influenced by Mel-O-Toons, Jay Ward, UPA, Gene Deitch's Terrytoons, Terry Gilliam, and using Synchro-Vox for the Daffy clone at one point) was a jab at the "inconsistent" animation quality control of Tiny Toon Adventures (the series' animation was handled by different studios). The animators had a contest on who could do the worst animation for the clones, with animator Nancy Beiman's Daffy winning. Ford himself animated the Synchro-Vox Daffy clone. After production wrapped, Warner Bros. shut down its New York animation division to consolidate its operations in Burbank in December 1991. The cartoon was intended for a theatrical release, but aired as part of the television special Bugs Bunny's Creature Features.

== Home media ==
The cartoon was released as a part of the Bugs Bunny Halloween Hijinks VHS special. It was later released, albeit in edited form, on the Space Jam Two-Disc Special Edition DVD as a special feature. In the Space Jam version, Yosemite Sam's scenes are removed. They were taken out by Warner Bros. Pictures due to "time allotment". Sam can still be heard in the edited version when all the Looney Tune "pods" are about to be launched into space. The uncut version was later released as part of The Essential Bugs Bunny DVD set and the Blu-Ray release of Daffy Duck's Quackbusters.
