= Rabbit of Seville =

1950 Looney Tunes theatrical cartoon short

- Title card
- Directed by: Charles M. Jones
- Story by: Michael Maltese
- Starring: Mel Blanc (credited); Arthur Q. Bryan (uncredited)
- Music by: Carl Stalling Gioachino Rossini
- Animation by: Phil Monroe; Ben Washam; Lloyd Vaughan; Ken Harris; Emery Hawkins
- Layouts by: Robert Gribbroek
- Backgrounds by: Philip De Guard
- Color process: Technicolor
- Production company: Warner Bros. Cartoons
- Distributed by: Warner Bros. Pictures; The Vitaphone Corporation
- Release date: December 16, 1950 (U.S.)
- Running time: 7:31
- Language: English

Rabbit of Seville is a Warner Bros. Looney Tunes theatrical cartoon short released on December 16, 1950. It was directed by Chuck Jones and written by Michael Maltese, and features Bugs Bunny and Elmer Fudd. The nonstop slapstick humor in the short is paced musically around the overture to Italian composer Gioachino Rossini's 1816 opera buffa The Barber of Seville. In 1994, Rabbit of Seville ranked number 12 in a list of "The 50 Greatest Cartoons" released in North America during the 20th century, a ranking compiled from votes cast by 1,000 artists, producers, directors, voice actors, and other professionals in the field of animation.

== Plot ==
A local amphitheater bustles with spectators to view a rendition of The Barber of Seville. Amidst the tranquil setting, Bugs Bunny is chased by hunter Elmer Fudd, traversing from the distant hills to the theater's backstage. Bugs raises the curtain, revealing Elmer to the audience.

Exploiting the theatrical milieu to his advantage, Bugs assumes various guises from the opera to outwit Elmer, from a temptress to a snake charmer and, in particular, a barber.

As the absurd escapade unfolds, a cacophony of comedic chaos ensues, culminating in a farcical exchange of increasingly outlandish weaponry. From pedicures to peculiar grooming rituals, Bugs subjects Elmer to a series of ludicrous predicaments.

In a climactic flourish, Bugs orchestrates a mock wedding ceremony, symbolizing the culmination of their absurd escapade. After the wedding, Bugs carries Elmer high into the rafters, opens the door to a prop house, and drops Elmer into the wedding cake reserved for the opera's second act far below. Bugs then chomps on a carrot and says "Ehhh... next!"

== Production ==
In a plotline reminiscent of Stage Door Cartoon, Rabbit of Seville features Bugs Bunny being chased by Elmer Fudd into the stage door of the Hollywood Bowl, whereupon Bugs tricks Elmer into going onstage, and participating in a break-neck operatic production of their chase punctuated with gags and accompanied by musical arrangements by Carl Stalling, focusing on Rossini's overture to the 1816 opera The Barber of Seville.

In Stalling's arrangement, the overture's basic structure is kept relatively intact; some repeated passages are removed and the overall piece is conducted at a faster tempo to accommodate the cartoon's standard running length. In a short sequence where Bugs' scalp massage follows a piano solo, the character's hands are shown with five fingers, instead of his usual four, so the character can believably follow the tune. In 1994 it was voted No. 12 of the 50 Greatest Cartoons of all time by members of the animation field.

The "Barber of Seville" poster that appears at the start of the film features three names: Eduardo Selzeri, Michele Maltese, and Carlo Jonzi, which are Italianized versions of the names of the producer (Edward Selzer), writer (Michael Maltese), and director (Chuck Jones) of the film.

== Reception ==
Animation historian Greg Ford writes, "Chuck Jones' two most beloved operatic extravaganzas starring Bugs Bunny, What's Opera, Doc? (1957) and Rabbit of Seville, veer down somewhat different paths stylistically. What's Opera, Doc? relies on a more removed, high-concept graphic sense and the shock effect of Maurice Noble's splendidly expressionistic set design. The humor of Rabbit of Seville, staged against Robert Gribbroek's straightforward backgrounds, depends more exclusively on the cartoon's intense synchronization whereby every bit of slapstick action, mini-movement by mini-movement, links to the accompanying Rossini score. In Seville, Jones was really harking back to an older Warner Bros. legacy: director Friz Freleng's Rhapsody in Rivets (1941) and Pigs in a Polka (1943), perhaps the two most insistently 'Mickey Moused' (perfectly synched) musical cartoons ever made."

== Home media ==
Rabbit of Seville is available, uncut and digitally remastered, on disc 1 of Looney Tunes Golden Collection: Volume 1, on disc 1 of The Essential Bugs Bunny, on disc 1 of Looney Tunes Platinum Collection: Volume 1, and on disc 2 of Bugs Bunny 80th Anniversary Collection.

Preceded by Bushy Hare	Bugs Bunny Cartoons; 1950	Succeeded by Hare We Go
