= The Wise Quacking Duck =

1943 film by Robert Clampett

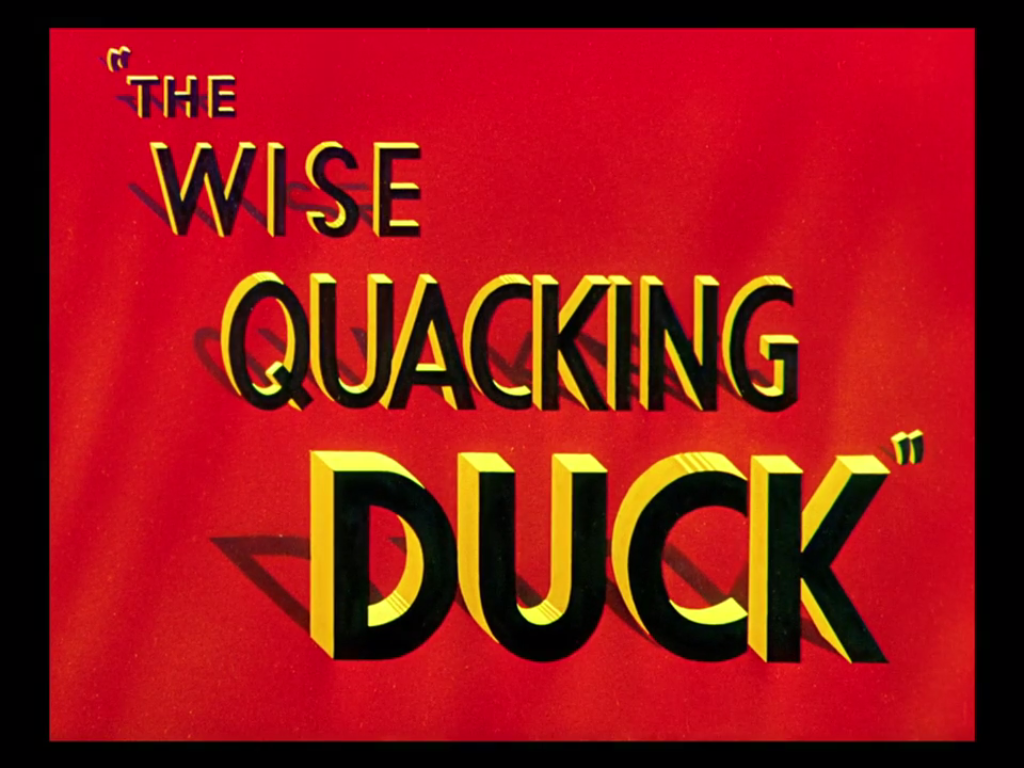
- Title card
- Directed by: Robert Clampett
- Story by: Warren Foster
- Produced by: Leon Schlesinger
- Music by: Carl W. Stalling
- Animation by: Phil Monroe
- Color process: Technicolor
- Production company: Leon Schlesinger Productions
- Distributed by: Warner Bros. Pictures
- Release date: May 1, 1943
- Running time: 6 min
- Country: United States
- Language: English

The Wise Quacking Duck is a 1943 American animated comedy short film directed by Robert Clampett. The cartoon was released on May 1, 1943. It is part of the Looney Tunes series and the twentieth cartoon to star Daffy Duck.

== Plot ==
The cartoon begins with Mr. Meek (voiced by Darrell Payne) carrying an axe in his hands. He turns to the audience and explains that his wife, Sweetypuss, told him that if he did not bring home a roast duck for dinner, she would "cook (his) goose". (A parody of Wallace Wimple and his wife "Sweetie Face"). The scene cuts to Daffy eating corn while singing "I Dream of Jeanie with the Light Brown Hair" minding his business. A shadow of Meek is shown getting ready to chop off Daffy's head. When he swings the axe, narrowly missing Daffy's head, Daffy jumps up and shouts "WATCH IT, BUB!!!" directly in his face.

After a brief talk to Meek, he flicks his beak at his face and marches to a hay stack. Meek chops the stack various times and on the last chop, he thinks he killed the duck. Daffy fakes his death by squirting ketchup and throwing his feathers around ("You crushed my little head!"). This fools Meek by pretending he is beheaded and runs rapidly before falling.

Meek feels sad and returns to his house, where Daffy is seen putting many sugar cubes into a cup of coffee. Meek guiltily tells him that he has killed a duck. Daffy cheers up Meek into giving him a cup of coffee and asks how many lumps (of sugar) his wife usually gives him. Meek shows Daffy a 'lump' (a bump on his head), and Daffy hits him on the head (giving him another 'lump') and pours cream on it. Daffy dances on the cakes and pies, singing "Shortenin' Bread", and Meek immediately recognizes the duck he thought he killed ("Say. That's that Daffy Duck."). Daffy then utters 'YOU AIN'T JUST WHISTLING DIXIE!!!', then throws a pie at him, leading into a war between himself and Meek.

Daffy goes into army plane mode to the strains of the theme song of Captains of the Clouds, by dropping an egg on Meek as a "Secret Bomb Sight". Next, he goes into battle weaponry mode, by making various sounds and smashing household items. After all the fun and games are over, Meek gets mad, which causes the egg to fry on his head.

Daffy runs off, but is caught by Meek with a shotgun. He puts it up to Daffy's face and orders him to get in the oven. Daffy performs a striptease to the tune "It Had to Be You".

The war continues through some parts of the cartoon, including a fortune teller (referring to Jerry Colonna). Going back to the curve run scene, Meek points his gun to Daffy's face again ("No no. Not twice in a same picture."). Meek blows the feathers off him and throws him in the oven. When he hears Daffy screaming in the oven, he feels guilty and opens the door. The cartoon ends with Daffy bathing himself in gravy ("Say. Now you're cooking with gas.").

== Voice Cast ==
- Mel Blanc as Daffy Duck
- Darrell R. Payne as Mr. Meek (imitation of Wallace Wimple)

== Home media ==
- VHS 1986 - Viddy-Oh! For Kids Cartoon Festivals: Daffy Duck Cartoon Festival Featuring "Ain't That Ducky" - MGM/UA Home Video
- VHS 1988 - Cartoon Moviestars: Just Plain Daffy - MGM/UA Home Video
- Laserdisc 1992 - The Golden Age of Looney Tunes: Volume 2 - MGM/UA Home Video
- DVD 2007 - Looney Tunes Golden Collection: Volume 5 (restored) - Warner Home Video
- DVD 2008 - Watch on the Rhine (extra, unrestored) - Warner Home Video
- Blu-Ray & DVD 2012 - Looney Tunes Platinum Collection: Volume 2 (restored) - Warner Home Video
- DVD 2013 - Best of Warner Bros: 50 Cartoon Collection - Looney Tunes (restored) - Warner Home Video
- DVD 2014 - Looney Tunes Spotlight Collection: Volume 8 (restored) - Warner Home Video

== See also ==
- Daffy Duck filmography
- Looney Tunes and Merrie Melodies filmography (1940–1949)

Preceded by To Duck or Not to Duck	Daffy Duck Cartoons; 1943	Succeeded by Yankee Doodle Daffy
