= Porky & Daffy =

1938 film by Robert Clampett

- Title card
- Directed by: Robert Clampett
- Produced by: Leon Schlesinger
- Starring: Mel Blanc
- Music by: Carl W. Stalling
- Animation by: Robert Cannon; John Carey
- Color process: Black-and-white
- Production company: Leon Schlesinger Productions
- Distributed by: Warner Bros. Pictures; The Vitaphone Corporation
- Release date: August 6, 1938
- Running time: 7 minutes
- Language: English

Porky & Daffy is a 1938 American animated comedy short film directed by Bob Clampett. The cartoon was released on August 6, 1938. It is part of the Looney Tunes series, the 44th cartoon to feature Porky Pig and the fourth cartoon to feature Daffy Duck. The cartoon defined the duo's dynamic, contributing to their popularity and establishing a formula that would be used until Daffy was reworked by Chuck Jones and paired with Bugs Bunny.

== Plot ==
Porky finds a newspaper ad inviting readers to take on a rooster boxer named The Champ. Porky manages to wake up Daffy by hitting a dinner platter over his head. This causes him to immediately go crazy and start warming up for a boxing match, destroying a bed in the process.

Later, at a jam-packed boxing ring, Porky volunteers Daffy to fight the Champ after all the other fighters run off scared. The Champ is exhausted from having to hold in his muscles with his clothes, but reinvigorates after removing them. With a mighty roar, he manages to blow off Daffy's suit, which hides sacks of flour to make him looks muscular, as well as the sacks of flour themselves. Daffy is unfazed and simply retaliates by acting like a lion tamer, driving him back with a chair and whip.

As the match begins, the announcer reminds them "no hitting below the belt", so Daffy raises his shorts to cover all but his head. The Champ then blows his shorts off. Daffy flees, but with a reminder from Porky, gets on his "tricycle", wheeling through midair, and soon going so fast that the slower Champ cannot keep up, using the advantage to repeatedly punch him. Once he is out of sight, the announcer and the Champ look around for Daffy, only to discover he has hidden inside the pelican's beak. The Champ beats up the announcer to get to Daffy, finally catching him, only for the duck to fly out of the announcer's beak. The Champ then tries to bribe Daffy with a candy cane, which miraculously succeeds in baiting him into lowering his guard. The Champ then beats up Daffy offscreen. After the melee, Daffy is unscathed yet asleep, which the Champ believes to be his victory. Porky manages to rush home, retrieve the dinner platter and return in 4 seconds to wake up Daffy, who then ferociously attacks Champ, ducking all his attacks and using a baseball bat to return a long-distance punch which knocks out Champ. As Daffy wins the match, he adds insult to injury by waking up the Champ with the dinner platter, causing him to go on a similar frenzy.

== Voice Cast ==
- Mel Blanc as Daffy Duck / Porky Pig / The Champ / The Referee

== Home media ==
- VHS 1992 - Daffy Duck: Tales from the Duckside (computer colorized) - Warner Home Video
- VHS 2001 - Looney Tunes: The Collector's Edition, Vol. 12 - Porky and Daffy (black and white) - Warner Home Video/Columbia House
- DVD 2005 - Angels with Dirty Faces (extra, unrestored, black and white) - Warner Home Video
- DVD 2017 - Porky Pig 101 (unrestored, black and white) - Warner Archive Collection
- Blu-Ray 2021 - Angels with Dirty Faces (extra, restored, black and white) - Warner Archive Collection

== See also ==
- Daffy Duck filmography
- Porky Pig filmography
- Looney Tunes and Merrie Melodies filmography (1930–1939)
