= How to Draw Comics the Marvel Way =

1978 book by Stan Lee and John Buscema

- Cover art by John Buscema
- Date: 1978
- Page count: 192 pages
- Publisher: Marvel Fireside Books

Creative team
- Writers: Stan Lee
- Pencillers: John Buscema

Original publication
- Date of publication: 1978
- Language: English
- ISBN: 978-0671530778

How to Draw Comics the Marvel Way is a book by Stan Lee and John Buscema. The book teaches the aspiring comic book artist how to draw and create comic books. The examples are from Marvel Comics and Buscema artwork. It was first published in 1978 by Marvel Fireside Books and has been reprinted regularly. The book created a generation of cartoonists who learned there was a "Marvel way to draw and a wrong way to draw". It is considered "one of the best instruction books on creating comics ever produced".

Scott McCloud has cited the book as a good reference for teaching the process of making comic books.

Lee and Buscema also created a video version of the book which is now on DVD.

The book's popularity resulted in two follow-ups that played on the title: "How to Read Comics the Marvel Way" by Christopher Hastings and others (2022), and "How to Create Comics the Marvel Way" by Mark Waid (2024).

== See also ==
- Marvel Premiere Classics
- The Official Marvel Try-Out Book
- Stan Lee
