= Origins of Marvel Comics =

1974 collection of comic book stories

- Author: Stan Lee
- Cover artist: John Romita Sr.
- Language: English
- Genre: Superhero
- Publisher: Marvel Fireside Books (Simon & Schuster)
- Publication date: September 1974
- Publication place: United States
- Followed by: Son of Origins of Marvel Comics

Origins of Marvel Comics is a 1974 collection of Marvel Comics comic book stories, selected and introduced by Marvel writer and editor Stan Lee. The book was published by Marvel Fireside Books, an imprint of Simon & Schuster, and was Marvel's first trade paperback collection.

The book collected the first story and a more recent story starring five of Marvel's star characters: The Fantastic Four, Spider-Man, Thor, the Hulk and Doctor Strange. Lee wrote an introduction to the collection, and anecdotes introducing each story. The book was very successful, and was followed by annual sequels in the Marvel Fireside Books series: Son of Origins of Marvel Comics (1975), Bring on the Bad Guys (1976) and The Superhero Women (1977).

== Style ==
Lee's introduction to the Fantastic Four section typifies his "tongue-in-cheek verbosity and ad-man hyperbole":

In the beginning Marvel created the Bullpen and the Style.
And the Bullpen was without form, and was void; and darkness was upon the face of the Artists. And the Spirit of Marvel moved upon the face of the Writers.
And Marvel said, Let there be The Fantastic Four. And there was The Fantastic Four.
And Marvel saw The Fantastic Four. And it was good.

Matt Yockey observes that "Lee invokes his own childhood love of the pulp character The Spider as a primary motivation for creating Spider-Man. He thus articulates a narrative of transformation from fan to professional that makes his own textual self-production in the comic books more personal and identifiable to readers."

== Contents ==
The book contained the following stories:

- "The Fantastic Four" (Fantastic Four #1, November 1961)
- "When Strikes the Silver Surfer!" (Fantastic Four #55, October 1966)
- "The Hulk" (The Incredible Hulk #1, May 1962)
- "A Clash of Titans" (The Incredible Hulk #118, August 1969)
- "Spider-Man!" (Amazing Fantasy #15, August 1962)
- "Rocked By... the Shocker!" (The Amazing Spider-Man #72, May 1969)
- "Thor the Mighty and the Stone Men from Saturn!" (Journey Into Mystery #83, August 1962)
- "And Soon Shall Come the Enchanters!" (Thor #143, August 1967)
- "Doctor Strange, Master of Black Magic!" (Strange Tales #110, July 1963)
- "The Origin of Doctor Strange" (Strange Tales #115, December 1963)
- "The Fearful Finish!" (Strange Tales #155, April 1967)

The cover was illustrated by John Romita Sr.

== Reception ==
A contemporary review in the Saskatoon Star-Phoenix criticized Lee's bombastic style: "Though his patronizing tone is entertaining for the first few paragraphs, he seems to forget one of his own conclusions about the readers of comics books [sic], that they are not necessarily youthful devotees who are accustomed to being lectured, but rather may be reasonably intelligent and educated people who will quickly tire of Lee's self-centred and falsely casual manner." However, the review allows that the book offers "substantial information of the early evolution of the comic book and its first steps to becoming a true piece of 20th century art."

Author Ray Bradbury wrote an unusual review of Origins of Marvel Comics for The Los Angeles Times, "Here's a Pictorial Tonic to Relieve Virus Plaguing a World with Too Much Reality," praising the "intellectual-with-a-small-i" who enjoys both highbrow literary classics and middlebrow comic strips. In a florid passage, Bradbury wrote, "I sing the full wide-open-alert-unbiased, sometimes splendidly mediocre, pig-that-flies man and woman and their dirty children with bright faces. If this sounds like a description of you with your secret guilts for having loved the wrong films and wrong books, Stan Lee's new volume is the very stuff for you."

A critical review in The Spectrum, the University at Buffalo student newspaper, savaged Lee's style: "The writing is stylistically crummy, which wouldn't be so jarring if Lee hadn't made such a big deal about his style. It takes an embarrassing [sic] combination of pretentiousness, awkwardness, insecurity, and ignorance to write a sentence like, 'Myself when born was christened Stanley Martin Lieber — truly an appellation to conjure with.'" The review also groused, "Production values were expendable to the publisher. Lee introduces one Spiderman [sic] story, but instead another one is printed. The Dr. Strange stories near the end of the book are placed in the wrong relationship to the introductory copy; one of them is thrown in after the epilogue. Maybe they'll fix these things in subsequent printings. Then again, Marvel's mistakes are legend, by now. Maybe they'll leave them in."

In Give Our Regards to the Atom-Smashers! Writers on Comics, Christopher Sorrentino points out that, in the mid-70s, the stories chosen to represent the modern style were all from the late 1960s: "The message coming through loud and clear was that Marvel had already peaked."

== Sequels ==
Origins of Marvel Comics was followed in 1975 with Son of Origins of Marvel Comics, featuring the origins of the X-Men, Iron Man, the Avengers, Daredevil, Nick Fury, the Watcher, and the Silver Surfer. In addition to the single release, Origins and Son of Origins were offered as a two-volume set in a slipcased edition.

The two Origins books were followed by Bring on the Bad Guys, origins of a selection of Marvel villains; and The Superhero Women, featuring some of Marvel's most popular female superheroes. Eventually, the series moved away from origin stories and published collections of classic stories with individual characters such as Spider-Man, the Fantastic Four, the Hulk, Captain America, and Doctor Strange.
