= The Bear's Tale =

1940 film by Fred Avery

- Original title card
- Directed by: Fred Avery
- Story by: J.B. Hardaway
- Produced by: Leon Schlesinger
- Starring: Sara Berner; Bernice Hansen; Fred Avery; Mel Blanc
- Narrated by: Robert C. Bruce
- Music by: Carl W. Stalling
- Animation by: Rod Scribner
- Color process: Technicolor
- Production company: Leon Schlesinger Productions
- Distributed by: Warner Bros. Pictures
- Release date: April 13, 1940
- Running time: 9 min
- Country: United States
- Language: English

The Bear's Tale is a 1940 American animated comedy short film directed by Fred Avery. The short was released on April 13, 1940. It is part of the Merrie Melodies series. It is a comical re-creation of Goldilocks and the Three Bears mixed with Little Red Riding Hood. It was re-released as a "Blue Ribbon" reissue in 1944.

== Plot ==
In the opening sequence, the Cast frame quotes "Miss Goldilocks appears through the courtesy of The Mervin LeBoy Productions". This is in reference to Mervyn LeRoy, the film producer.

The Three Bears, Papa Bear, Mama Bear and Junior eat their porridge, only to realize it is too hot, especially Papa Bear who burns his tongue after multiple sips but laughs it off after drinking hot water by accident. They decide to bike near their house until the porridge cools, with Junior pedaling hard due to his parents relaxing their feet.

Goldilocks is lost in the woods and walks into Little Red Riding Hood's grandmother's house, where the Big Bad Wolf had eaten Red's grandmother and lies on her bed in disguise to lure Red, only to be disappointed by Goldilocks' presence. He directs Goldilocks to the Three Bears' house and changes his plan to abduct her instead, taking a taxi to the house where he hides in Junior's bed after reading the tale.

The Three Bears return home after Papa Bear is slapped for mocking a police siren. Little Red Riding Hood arrives at her grandmother's house and discovers that she was eaten by the Wolf, who left behind a note explaining everything. She calls the Three Bears, with Goldilocks listening after eating all of the porridge offscreen before she would have walked into Junior's bed for a nap. She is notified of the truth, handed the note and leaves the premises, but not before she searches the Bears' telephone for spare change. The Three Bears find their porridge eaten, with Papa Bear mistaking the wolf for Goldilocks. Horrified, they flee the premises to avoid being eaten, including Junior whose pants come off loose.

== Voice cast ==
- Mel Blanc as Big Bad Wolf
- Sara Berner as Mama Bear and Little Red Riding Hood
- Tex Avery as Papa Bear
- Bernice Hansen as Baby Bear and Goldilocks
- Robert C. Bruce as Narrator

== Home media ==
- Laserdisc: The Golden Age of Looney Tunes: Volume 1, Side 3 - Tex Avery
- VHS: The Golden Age of Looney Tunes: Volume 3 - Tex Avery
- VHS: Looney Tunes Collector's Edition: Volume 8 - Tex-Book Avery
- DVD: Looney Tunes Golden Collection: Volume 5
- DVD: Looney Tunes Spotlight Collection: Volume 5
- Streaming: HBO Max
