= The Lyin' Mouse =

1937 film by Isadore Freleng

- Blue Ribbon reissue title card
- Directed by: Isadore Freleng
- Story by: Tedd Pierce
- Produced by: Leon Schlesinger
- Starring: Mel Blanc; Billy Bletcher; Bernice Hansen
- Music by: Carl W. Stalling
- Animation by: Ken Harris
- Color process: Technicolor
- Production company: Leon Schlesinger Productions
- Distributed by: Warner Bros. Productions; The Vitaphone Corporation
- Release date: October 16, 1937
- Running time: 7 minutes
- Country: United States
- Language: English

The Lyin' Mouse is a 1937 American animated comedy short film directed by Isadore Freleng. The short was released on October 16, 1937. It is the 84th film in the Merrie Melodies series. It is the first film in the series with a story credit. It was re-released as a "Blue Ribbon" reissue in 1945, rendering the original film and credits lost.

== Plot ==
A mouse is trying to free his tail from a mousetrap when a cat arrives. Desperate to avoid getting eaten, the rodent asks if the feline has ever heard the story of The Lion and the Mouse. The cat notes that he is unfamiliar with the tale, but nevertheless stops in his tracks to listen.

A lion comes upon a mouse who uses a horn to imitates the lion’s roar and causes every nearby animal to escape to his amusement. The mouse pleads for his life, and the lion agrees not to eat him due to his small size and unintended disrespect. As the mouse recommends that he can be of help before leaving, the lion falls for traps set up by Frank Cluck, including a fake roast chicken and a lamb that insists to be eaten and convinces the lion of the benefits of eating mutton. The lion is swiftly captured by Frank and taken to a circus, where he is forced against his will to perform circus tricks. The mouse bites a lion-sized hole on the back and frees him as they make a mad dash to the wild.

The cat is moved and apologetically releases the mouse, giving him the cheese on the mousetrap. Upon release, just before entering his hole, the mouse yells one last word: "Sucker!" To which the cat responds by lunging at the rodent, but he misses and bumps into the wall. As the cartoon ends, the feline shrugs and tells the audience: "Well, can you imagine that?"

== Home media ==
- LaserDisc - The Golden Age of Looney Tunes, Volume 5, Side 3 (USA 1995 dubbed print)
- DVD/Blu-ray - Looney Tunes Mouse Chronicles: The Chuck Jones Collection (USA 1995 dubbed print added as a bonus)
- Blu-ray - Looney Tunes Collector's Vault: Volume 3 (restored)
