= Hare and Loathing in Las Vegas =

2004 Bugs Bunny animated short film by Peter Shin

- Directed by: Peter Shin; Bill Kopp
- Written by: Chris Headrick; Bill Kopp; Dan Povenmire
- Produced by: Sherry Gunther
- Starring: Joe Alaskey; Jeff Bennett
- Edited by: David L. Bertman
- Music by: Walter Murphy
- Production company: Warner Bros. Animation
- Distributed by: Warner Bros. Pictures
- Release date: March 31, 2004
- Running time: 6:28
- Country: United States
- Language: English

Hare and Loathing in Las Vegas is a 2004 Bugs Bunny cartoon short, which co-starred Yosemite Sam. It was directed by Peter Shin and Bill Kopp, and produced by Warner Bros. Animation.

== Plot ==
Bugs is living in his rabbit hole that is just outside of Las Vegas, when Yosemite Sam builds a casino over it. Being given the option to gamble or get out, Bugs tries his luck. At every game he plays (blackjack, roulette, slot machines) he wins surprisingly and spectacularly, much to Sam's consternation. By the time he leaves with a sum total of $8,042,123,297.55 (more money comes out of Sam as if he was another slot machine), Sam is down to his last quarter (which Bugs will be back for that).

After reprimanding a group of cheaters and telling them that good luck charms like lucky medals, four-leaf clovers, and horseshoes are not allowed, Sam realizes that Bugs did well because he had two of them: his feet, and that he has been hornswoggled. Bugs has meanwhile used his newfound riches to buy a luxury hotel suite. Sam follows him shooting and Bugs quickly wins a prize car to outrace him; Sam, meanwhile, drives a giant pirate ship, complete with cannons. The two race out of Las Vegas and eventually make it to the Hoover Dam. There is a conveniently placed slot machine, which Sam uses his last quarter to play. He "wins", but the screen reads H_{2}O, causing the dam to burst.

The short ends with Sam phoning Bugs (atop the now-empty dam) to tell him, "I hate you, rabbit."

== Voice cast ==
- Joe Alaskey as Bugs Bunny
- Jeff Bennett as Yosemite Sam
- Maurice LaMarche and Tress MacNeille as Additional voices

== Production notes ==
The cartoon was never released theatrically (due to the poor box-office performance of the 2003 animated film, Looney Tunes: Back in Action); it was initially released on the Australian DVD release of Looney Tunes: Back in Action (from which Sam reprises his role as a casino owner) and was later included in The Essential Bugs Bunny DVD set.

The title is a parody of Hunter S. Thompson's book Fear and Loathing in Las Vegas and its film of the same name.

== See also ==
- List of Bugs Bunny cartoons
- List of Yosemite Sam cartoons
