= Brides in Love =

Comic book series

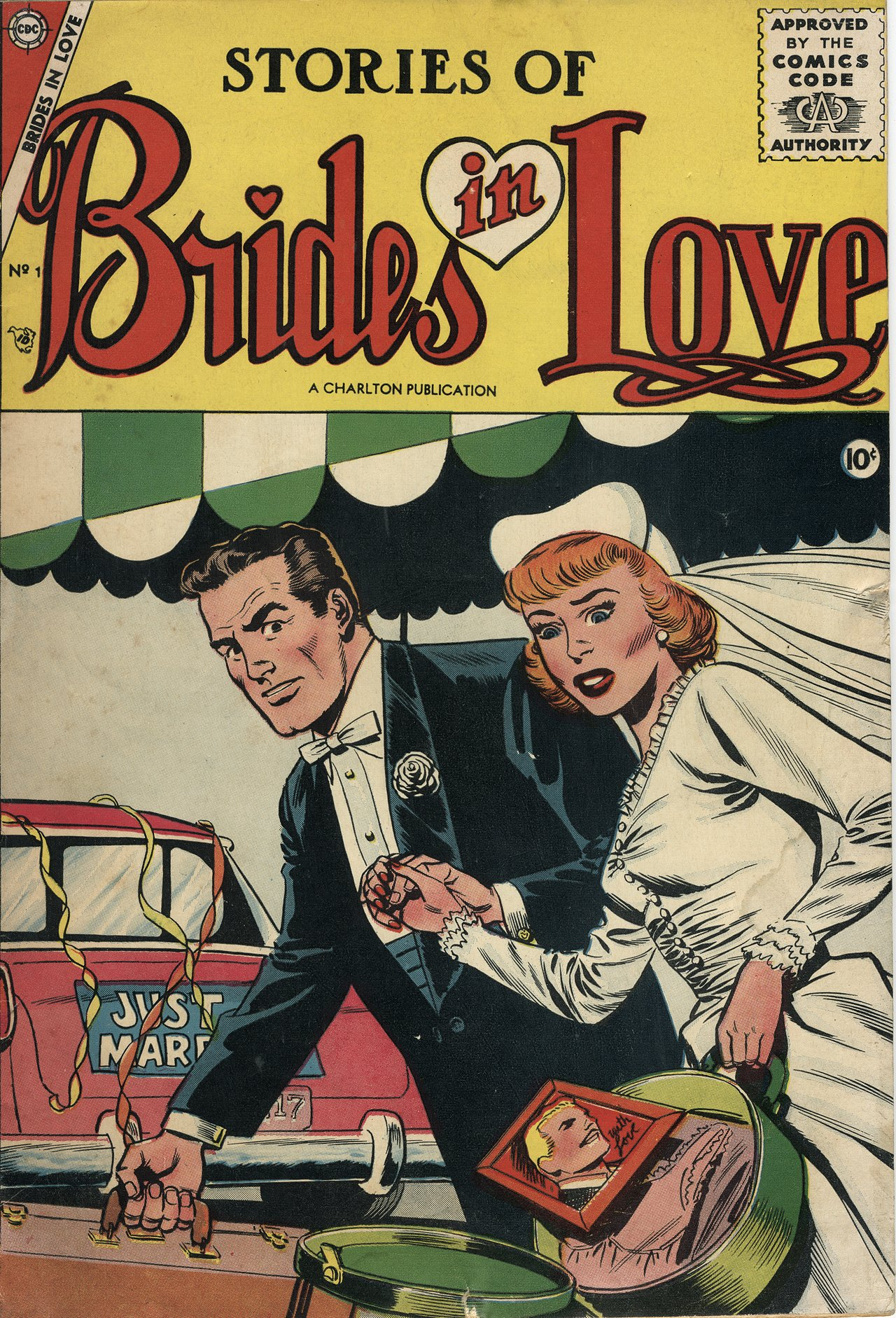
- Cover to Brides in Love #1 (Aug. 1956).

Publication information
- Publisher: Charlton Comics
- Schedule: Bimonthly
- Format: Ongoing series
- Genre: Romance
- Publication date: Aug. 1956 – Feb. 1965
- No. of issues: 45

Brides in Love (cover title Stories of Brides in Love) is a comic book series in the romance comics genre. It was published by Charlton Comics in the 1950s and 1960s. With Brides in Love “Charlton checked out the strength of the romance market” (for the superhero market, Charlton introduced the comic Nature Boy).

One of Charlton's longest lasting series, Brides in Love was published from August 1956 to November 1965. At that point, the title was "split" into two ongoing comics, Hollywood Romances and Summer Love, both of which continued the numbering of Brides in Love. Hollywood Romances lasted 14 additional issues, publishing its final issue, #59, in June 1971. Summer Love only lasted three issues, publishing its final issue, #48, in Nov. 1968.
