= Bugsy and Mugsy =

1957 film

- Lobby card
- Directed by: Friz Freleng
- Story by: Warren Foster
- Starring: Mel Blanc (all voices)
- Edited by: Treg Brown
- Music by: Carl Stalling; Milt Franklyn
- Animation by: Virgil Ross; Gerry Chiniquy; Art Davis
- Layouts by: Hawley Pratt
- Backgrounds by: Boris Gorelick
- Color process: Technicolor
- Production company: Warner Bros. Cartoons
- Distributed by: Warner Bros. Pictures; Vitaphone
- Release date: August 31, 1957 (USA)
- Running time: 7 minutes
- Country: United States
- Language: English

Bugsy and Mugsy is a 1957 Warner Bros. Looney Tunes cartoon directed by Friz Freleng. The short was released on August 31, 1957, and stars Bugs Bunny, with Rocky and Mugsy. Bugs discovers that two robbers are hiding out on the floor above him, and plays them off against each other. The cartoon is a remake of the 1950 Merrie Melodies short Stooge for a Mouse, in which a mouse pitted Sylvester and Mike (a bulldog) against each other in the same way.

== Plot ==
Bugs Bunny takes shelter under the floorboards of a derelict building after heavy rain floods his rabbit hole. A few moments later, Rocky and Mugsy enter the building to escape from the police after committing a jewel theft. While discussing the theft, Rocky's mention of "14 carats" catches Bugs' interest. After hearing Rocky discuss plans for another robbery the following day, Bugs vows to foil their plans.

During the night, while both Rocky and Mugsy are sleeping, Bugs speaks to Rocky via a hidden telephone and warns him that Mugsy is scheming against him and places a meat cleaver in Mugsy's hand to convince Rocky that Mugsy will try and kill him, which causes Rocky to angrily grab the cleaver and slice the arm of the couch (and Mugsy's hat) in half. Later, Bugs unscrews the light fixture above Rocky. Mugsy spots this and grabs a ladder and screwdriver but is too late to stop the light falling on Rocky, who retaliates by assaulting Mugsy. Bugs then replaces Rocky's cigarette with a stick of dynamite and imitates his voice to ask Mugsy to light his cigarette. Mugsy lights the dynamite, which explodes in Rocky's face, causing Rocky to issue a further beating before throwing Rocky into the next room with his arms and legs tied up. Bugs then saws around Rocky's chair and causes him to fall through the floor. Bugs then places the saw in Mugsy's hands and Rocky, despite Mugsy still being tied up, blames him and gives him another vicious beating.

Bugs' final act is to place roller skates on Mugsy's feet and, using a powerful magnet below the floor, controls Mugsy's movements and makes him crash into Rocky several times, who responds by punching Mugsy back across the room. While this is going on, the police turn up outside the building and arrest Rocky and Mugsy.

In the back of the police car, Rocky wonders how the police knew where they were and, despite Mugsy protesting his innocence, Rocky punches him and starts jumping on him. Bugs is then shown sitting outside the building holding a Do-It-Yourself manual. Remarking "isn't it wonderful what you can do with some wire and a few electric bulbs?", the camera pans up to reveal a large flashing sign reading "Rocky's Hideaway" on the front of the building.

== Music ==
- Brahms' Lullaby by Johannes Brahms
- Jimmy Valentine by Gus Edwards

Preceded by What's Opera, Doc?	Bugs Bunny Cartoons; 1957	Succeeded by Show Biz Bugs
