= John Buscema =

American comic book artist (1927–2002)

- Buscema in 1975
- Born: Giovanni Natale Buscema; December 11, 1927 New York City, U.S.
- Died: January 10, 2002 (aged 74) Port Jefferson, New York, U.S.
- Areas: Penciller, Inker
- Notable works: The Avengers; Conan the Barbarian; Fantastic Four; Silver Surfer; Tarzan; Thor
- Awards: Alley Award, 1968, 1969; Shazam Award, 1974; Eagle Award, 1977; Inkpot Award, 1978; Eisner Award Hall of Fame, 2002

John Buscema (/bjuːˈsɛmə/ bew-SEM-ə; born Giovanni Natale Buscema, Italian: [dʒoˈvanni naˈtaːle buʃˈʃɛːma]; December 11, 1927 – January 10, 2002) was an American comic book artist and one of the mainstays of Marvel Comics during its 1960s and 1970s ascendancy into an industry leader and its subsequent expansion to a major pop-culture conglomerate. His younger brother Sal Buscema was also a comic book artist.

Buscema is best known for his run on the series The Avengers and The Silver Surfer, and for over 200 stories featuring the sword-and-sorcery hero Conan the Barbarian. In addition, he pencilled at least one issue of nearly every major Marvel title, including long runs on two of the company's top magazines, Fantastic Four and Thor.

He was inducted into the Will Eisner Comic Book Hall of Fame in 2002. In October 2024, Buscema was inducted into the Harvey Awards Hall of Fame.

== Biography ==
=== Early life and career ===
Timely Comics' Man Comics #1 (Dec. 1949), one of Buscema's earliest recorded comic-book covers

Born and raised in Red Hook, Brooklyn, New York City, from Sicilian parents who emigrated from Pozzallo, Ragusa, John Buscema showed an interest in drawing at an early age, copying comic strips such as Popeye. In his teens, he developed an interest in both superhero comic books and such adventure comic strips as Hal Foster's Tarzan and Prince Valiant, Burne Hogarth's Tarzan, Alex Raymond's Flash Gordon, and Milton Caniff's Terry and the Pirates. He showed an interest in commercial illustration of the period, by such artists as N. C. Wyeth, Norman Rockwell, Dean Cornwell, Coby Whitmore, Albert Dorne, and Robert Fawcett.

Buscema graduated from Manhattan's High School of Music and Art. He took night lessons at Pratt Institute as well as life drawing classes at the Brooklyn Museum. While training as a boxer, he began painting portraits of boxers and sold some cartoons to The Hobo News. Seeking work as a commercial illustrator while doing various odd jobs, Buscema found himself instead entering the comic book field in 1948, landing a staff job under editor-in-chief and art director Stan Lee at Timely Comics, the forerunner of Marvel Comics. The Timely "bullpen", as the staff was called, included such fellow staffers as established veterans Syd Shores, Carl Burgos, Mike Sekowsky, George Klein, and Marty Nodell. Fellow newcomer Gene Colan, hired roughly two months earlier, recalled that "... John never seemed very happy in comics ... there always seemed to be something else he really wanted to do."

His first recorded credit is penciling the four-page story "Till Crime Do You Part" in Timely's Lawbreakers Always Lose #3 (Aug. 1948). He contributed to the "real-life" dramatic series True Adventures and Man Comics (the premiere issue of which sported one of Buscema's earliest recorded comic book covers), as well as to Cowboy Romances, Two-Gun Western (for which he drew at least one story of the continuing character the Apache Kid), Lorna the Jungle Queen, and Strange Tales. Until the bullpen was dissolved a year-and-a-half later, as comic books in general and superhero comics in particular continued their post-war fade in popularity, Buscema penciled and inked in a variety of genres, including crime fiction and romance fiction.

=== 1950s ===
Buscema married in 1953. He continued to freelance for Timely, by now known as Atlas Comics, as well as for the publishers Ace Comics, Hillman Periodicals, Our Publications/Orbit-Wanted, Quality Comics, St. John Publications, and Ziff-Davis.

Buscema's mid-1950s work includes Dell Comics' Roy Rogers Comics #74–91 (Feb. 1954 – July 1955) and subsequent Roy Rogers and Trigger #92–97 and #104–108 (Aug. 1955 – Jan. 1956 & Aug.–Dec. 1956); and the Charlton Comics series Ramar of the Jungle and Nature Boy — the latter, Buscema's first superhero work, with a character created by himself and Superman co-creator Jerry Siegel.

Buscema next produced a series of Western, war, and sword and sandal film adaptations for Dell's Four Color series. Buscema recalled, "I did a bunch of their movie books ... that was a lot of fun. I worked from stills on those, except for The Vikings. ... I think one of the best books I ever did was Sinbad the Sailor."

He drew at least one issue of the radio, film, and TV character the Cisco Kid for Dell in 1957, as well as one- to eight-page biographies of every U.S. president through Dwight Eisenhower for that company's one-shot Life Stories of American Presidents.

During a late 1950s downturn in the comics industry, Buscema drew occasional mystery, fantasy, and science-fiction stories for Atlas Comics' Tales to Astonish, Tales of Suspense, and Strange Worlds, and American Comics Group's Adventures into the Unknown, and Forbidden Worlds before leaving comics to do freelance commercial art. He began a freelance position for the New York City advertising firm the Chaite Agency, which employed such commercial artists as Bob Peak and Frank McCarthy.

=== 1960s ===
The Avengers #41 (June 1967), Buscema's first issue of a signature series. Cover art by Buscema and inker George Roussos.

Buscema spent approximately eight years in the commercial-art field, freelancing for the Chaite Agency (Note: This advertising agency, not to be confused with New York City's similarly named Lawrence G. Chait Agency or Chiat\Day, was responsible for, among other things, the one-sheet for the James Bond movie Thunderball, per "Exhibitions & Events: 'Poster Galore'". British Film Institute. Archived from the original on February 4, 2010.) and the studio Triad, doing a variety of assignments: layouts, storyboards, illustrations, paperback book covers, etc. in a variety of media. Buscema called this time "quite a learning period for me in my own development of techniques".

He returned to comic books in 1966 as a regular freelance penciller for Marvel Comics, debuting over Jack Kirby layouts on the "Nick Fury, Agent of S.H.I.E.L.D." story in Strange Tales #150 (Nov. 1966), followed by three "Hulk" stories in Tales to Astonish #85–87 (Nov. 1966 – Jan. 1967). He then settled in as regular penciller of The Avengers, which would become one of his signature series, with #41 (June 1967). Avengers #49–50, featuring Hercules and inked by Buscema, are two of his "best-looking [issues] of that period", said comics historian and one-time Marvel editor-in-chief Roy Thomas, who wrote those issues. Thomas and Buscema introduced new versions of the Black Knight and the Vision during their collaboration on The Avengers.

In order to adapt to the Marvel Comics style of superhero adventure, Buscema "synthesized the essence of [Jack] Kirby's supercharged action figures, harrowing perspectives, monolithic structures, mega-force explosions, and mythological planetscapes into a formula that he instantly integrated into his own superbly crafted vision," wrote comics artist and historian Jim Steranko. "The process brought Buscema's art to life in a way that it had never been before. Anatomically balanced figures of Herculean proportions stalked, stormed, sprawled, and savaged their way across Marvel's universe like none had previously".

Buscema would pencil an average of two comics a month in collaboration with such inkers as George Klein, Frank Giacoia, Dan Adkins, Joe Sinnott, his younger brother Sal Buscema, Tom Palmer, and, occasionally, Marvel production manager and sometime inker-cartoonist John Verpoorten. John Buscema named Frank Giacoia, Sal Buscema, and Tom Palmer as his favorite inkers.

The Silver Surfer #4 (July 1969). Cover art by Buscema and inker Sal Buscema. One of Buscema's most famous covers.

Among Buscema's works during this period fans and historians call the Silver Age of comic books are The Avengers #41–62 (June 1967 – March 1969) and The Avengers Annual #2 (Sept. 1968); the first eight issues of The Sub-Mariner (May–Dec. 1968); The Amazing Spider-Man #72–73, 76–81, 84–85 (ranging from June 1969 – June 1970 providing layouts finished by either John Romita Sr. or Jim Mooney), and two issues he himself finished over Romita layouts. Buscema drew the first appearance of the Prowler in The Amazing Spider-Man #78 (Nov. 1969).

In August 1968, Buscema and Stan Lee launched a new title, The Silver Surfer. That series about a philosophical alien roaming the world trying to understand both the divinity and the savagery of humanity was a personal favorite of Marvel editor-in-chief Stan Lee, who scripted. Buscema penciled 17 of its 18 issues — the first seven as a 25¢ "giant-size" title at a time when comics typically cost 12¢. "Beautifully drawn by John Buscema, this comic book represented an attempt to upgrade the medium with a serious character of whom Lee had grown very fond," assessed comics historian Les Daniels. Roy Thomas said Buscema considered Silver Surfer #4 (Feb. 1969), featuring a battle between the Silver Surfer and Thor, "as the highpoint of his Marvel work". Characters Buscema co-created in The Silver Surfer include the long-running arch-demon Mephisto in issue #3 (Dec. 1968).

Toward the end of the decade, Buscema drew some fill-in issues of superhero series and returned to familiar 1950s genres with a spate of supernatural mystery stories in Chamber of Darkness and Tower of Shadows, and romance tales in My Love and Our Love. He then returned to his signature series The Avengers for 11 issues inked by Tom Palmer.

=== 1970s ===
The creative team of Roy Thomas and John Buscema introduced new characters such as Arkon in The Avengers #75 (April 1970), Red Wolf in #80 (Sept. 1970), and the Squadron Supreme in #85 (Feb. 1971). With Jack Kirby's departure from Marvel in 1970, Buscema succeeded him on both of Kirby's titles: Fantastic Four (penciling issues #107–141, following John Romita Sr.) and Thor (Note: Also called The Mighty Thor per "Thor (I) • The Mighty Thor (I) (1966–1996)". Unofficial Handbook of Marvel Comics Creators. "Series is named Thor in the indicia [copyright] information, but most covers have the title [trademark] The Mighty Thor.") (#182–259). He additionally launched the feature "Black Widow" in Amazing Adventures vol. 2, #1 (Aug. 1970).

Marvel editor-in-chief Stan Lee, who collaborated with Buscema on many stories up to this time, wrote,

One thing I loved about Big John is the fact that I didn't have to spend time writing synopses for him. ... He'd always growl over the phone, 'Don't bother sending me any outlines, Stan. I hate to waste time reading them. Just tell what you've got in mind over the phone. I'll remember it.' So I'd tell him the story I wanted, and I have a hunch he didn't even write any notes while I spoke — because I spoke too fast — but it didn't matter. He remembered every last detail and the stories always came out perfect — at least as far as I was concerned.

Buscema began penciling Conan the Barbarian with #25 (April 1973) following Barry Smith's celebrated run, and debuted as the Conan artist of the black-and-white comics-magazine omnibus Savage Sword of Conan with issue #1 (Aug. 1974). He would eventually contribute to more than 100 issues of each title, giving him one of the most prolific runs for an artist on a single character. He additionally drew the Conan Sunday and daily syndicated newspaper comic strip upon its premiere on September 4, 1978, but left the strip due to financial considerations. He was replaced by Ernie Chan as of October 23, 1978. Buscema additionally contributed some storyboard illustrations for the 1982 Conan movie, as well as painting four covers for the Conan magazines. In 2010, Comics Bulletin ranked Buscema's work on Conan the Barbarian seventh on its list of the "Top 10 1970s Marvels".

For about ten years, he would produce an average three to four books' worth of pencils a month, such as Nova (1976) and Ms. Marvel (1977). In addition to his regular assignments he would pencil covers and fill-in issues of titles including Captain America, Captain Britain (Marvel UK), Daredevil, The Frankenstein Monster, Howard the Duck, Master of Kung Fu, Red Sonja and Warlock. He also drew a story for the science-fiction anthology Worlds Unknown.

Buscema contributed as well to Marvel's black-and-white comics magazines, including the features "Ka-Zar" in Savage Tales #1 (May 1971) and "Bloodstone" in Rampaging Hulk #1 (Jan. 1977), and Doc Savage #1 and 3 (Aug. 1975, Jan. 1976). Other magazine work ran the gamut from horror (Dracula Lives!, Monsters Unleashed, Tales of the Zombie) to humor (Crazy, Pizzaz).

Buscema left the Thor title for a time to launch the Marvel version of the Edgar Rice Burroughs character Tarzan in 1977. Other licensed projects include a 72-page The Wizard of Oz movie adaptation in an oversized "Treasury Edition" format with DeZuniga inking. For Power Records, which produced children's book-and-record sets, Buscema drew Star Trek and Conan the Barbarian comics. He contributed some superhero drawings for Pro, the NFL official magazine (1970), and penciled some chapters of the first issue of Marvel Comics Super Special featuring the rock group Kiss (1977).

In 1978, small-press publisher Sal Quartuccio released The Art of John Buscema, a retrospective that included an interview, previously unpublished sketches and drawings, and a cover that was also sold as a poster.

Buscema capped off the decade penciling writer Doug Moench's three-issue Weirdworld epic-fantasy tale "Warriors of the Shadow Realm" in Marvel Super Special #11–13 (June–Oct. 1979). Pacific Comics released an accompanying portfolio of six signed, colored plates from the story.

==== Teaching ====
In the mid-1970s, Buscema ran the John Buscema Art School, which advertised for students in the pages of many Marvel titles. Stan Lee made appearances as a guest lecturer at Buscema's school, and some of the school's graduates (including Bob Hall and Bruce Patterson) went on to become professional cartoonists. Buscema later said that teaching the class was "very gratifying" but that having to make the 60-mile drive after a day's work was too exhausting, and ultimately forced him to give it up. Buscema then collaborated with Lee on the book How to Draw Comics the Marvel Way (Marvel Fireside Books, 1978), a primer on comic book art and storytelling based on the comic art classes Buscema had given a few years prior, and has remained in print for over 25 years, in its 33rd printing as of 2007.

=== 1980s ===
After drawing the first issue of The Savage She-Hulk (Feb. 1980), Buscema abandoned regular superhero work in order to spearhead art duties on all three Conan titles. The popularity of the character spurred the release of a Conan movie in 1982; Buscema provided pencils and inks for a 48-page movie adaptation.

He continued to tackle other high-profile projects such as a Silver Surfer story for Epic Illustrated #1 (Spring 1980), a King Arthur story in Marvel Preview #22 (Summer 1980), the St. Francis of Assisi biography Francis, Brother of the Universe (1980), the second Superman and Spider-Man team-up (1981), and an adaptation of the 1981 movie Raiders of the Lost Ark.

He left King Conan in 1982 after nine issues, although he remained with Marvel's Robert E. Howard franchise with a revival of the Kull series for 10 issues, and left The Savage Sword of Conan in 1984 with #101 with a series of stories that he plotted himself. After pencilling the Conan the Destroyer movie adaptation in 1984 and the Conan of the Isles graphic novel in 1987, he left Conan the Barbarian with #190 in 1987, ending a 14-year association with the character.

After nearly five years away from superheroes, except for the first two issues of the X-Men-related, four-issue miniseries Magik (Dec. 1983 – March 1984), Buscema returned to familiar ground as regular penciller on The Avengers from #255–300 (May 1985 – Feb. 1989). He was regular penciller on Fantastic Four for its 300th issue, during a 15-issue stint from #296–309 (Nov. 1986 – Dec. 1987). Additionally, he fit in the three-issue film adaptation Labyrinth (Nov. 1986 – Jan. 1987) and the four-issue miniseries Mephisto (April–July 1987), starring a character he created with Stan Lee in The Silver Surfer.

Buscema reteamed with Lee on the Silver Surfer himself with the 1988 graphic novel Silver Surfer: Judgment Day, self-inked and done entirely as full-page panels. That year he and inker Klaus Janson drew a Wolverine solo feature in the biweekly anthology Marvel Comics Presents, followed by self-inked Wolverine series in that title. He pencilled the first 14 issues (Nov. 1988 – mid-Nov. 1989) of the first Wolverine ongoing series, self-inked on #7–8. Bill Sienkiewicz, who inked the last five issues of that run, recalled Buscema's pencil work as "the sturdiest foundation an inker or an embellisher could possibly hope to build on, and their beauty was not in their attention to fastidiously rendered minutiae, but instead were marvels of deceptive simplicity. Each page an example of grace, elegance and power."

=== Later career ===
Buscema began his sixth decade in the field by joining Roy Thomas for a return to The Savage Sword of Conan with #191 (Nov. 1991) for a 20-issue run. Conan the Rogue, a graphic novel Buscema plotted, pencilled, inked, and colored over a period of five years in his spare time appeared that same year. He both penciled and inked the graphic novel Wolverine: Bloody Choices (Nov. 1993).

Buscema returned to crime fiction with The Punisher War Zone #23–30 (Jan.–Aug. 1994, self-inking #26–29), that title's 1993 summer annual, and the 1994 graphic novel A Man Named Frank, a parallel-universe Punisher Western tale. He pencilled the Punisher portions of 1994's Archie Meets the Punisher team-up. No longer attached to a regular series after his Punisher run, he penciled and inked The Avengers Annual #23 (1994) and five more black-and-white Conan adventures, serving as that Marvel franchise's final artist on The Savage Sword of Conan with #235 (July 1995) and on the short-lived spin-off Conan the Savage with #10 (May 1996). Through 1999, he penciled a variety of superhero comics; both penciled and inked a black-and-white short story for Shadows and Light (1998); and made a final return to Conan with the Death Covered in Gold three-issue miniseries (1999).

Buscema worked with DC Comics for the first time in 2000, initially doing both pencils and inks on a "Batman Black and White" short story in Batman: Gotham Knights #7 (Sept. 2000). He reunited with Stan Lee on the 2001 one-shot Just Imagine Stan Lee and John Buscema Creating Superman.

He finished the pencils on 2003's Superman: Blood of my Ancestors, begun by Gil Kane, who had since died, and had just signed on for a five-issue miniseries with Roy Thomas, JLA: Barbarians, though he died after finishing the first issue.

An 11 x 17-inch lithograph print of the late 1960s/early 1970s Avengers, penciled by Buscema and painted in watercolor by Alex Ross for the publisher Dynamic Forces, was Buscema's last professional work.

Buscema's passion for drawing was such that he continued to draw and sketch in his spare time, often on the back of comic book art pages, and these images form a considerable body of work in their own right. His brother Sal Buscema recalled,

This guy used to eat, sleep and breathe drawing. It didn't matter what was going on around him. He would get bored with it and start sketching. ... He just couldn't stop drawing. [His back-of-board sketches were] better than some of the stuff that he did on the front. ... He'd get a spark of inspiration and turn the page over and draw whatever was in his skull.

== Personal life ==
Buscema, who lived in Port Jefferson, New York, on Long Island, at the time of his death, was married to Dolores Buscema, with whom he had a son, John Jr., and a daughter, Dianne. His granddaughter Stephanie Buscema is a freelance illustrator and cartoonist, who started out as an inker for her grandfather.

== Death and legacy ==
Buscema was diagnosed with stomach cancer, and died on January 10, 2002, at the age of 74. He was buried with an artist's pen in his hand.

On October 11, 2024, the Harvey Awards announced that Buscema was one of five comics creators to be inducted into the Harvey Awards Hall of Fame at the 36th annual Harvey Awards ceremony on October 18 at the New York Comic Con. The other four inductees were Akira Toriyama, Larry Hama, Sergio Aragonés, and Arthur Adams. Upon learning of the accolade, Buscema’s daughter, Dianne Buscema Gerogianis, stated, "We are honored on behalf of my father and wish to thank all who have selected him for the Harvey Awards Hall of Fame. Thank you for keeping his legacy alive."

== Awards and accolades ==
- 1968: Alley Award for Best Full-Length Story, for Marvel Comics' The Silver Surfer #1: "Origin of the Silver Surfer", by Stan Lee and John Buscema (tied with DC Comics' The Brave and the Bold #79: "Track of the Hook", by Bob Haney and Neal Adams): also Best New Strip for The Silver Surfer.
- 1969: Alley Award for Best Full-Length Story for The Silver Surfer #5: "... And Who Shall Mourn for Him?", by Stan Lee, John Buscema, and Sal Buscema.
- 1974: Shazam Award for Best Penciller (Dramatic Division).
- 1977: Eagle Award for Favourite Single Comicbook Story for Howard the Duck #3: "Four Feathers of Death", with Steve Gerber.
- 1978: Inkpot Award
- 1997: "Author that We Loved" award at the Spanish Haxtur Awards.
- 2002: Inducted into the Eisner Award Hall of Fame.
- In 2002, Spain's Haxtur Awards inaugurated the Special John Buscema Award.
- 2024: Inducted in to the Harvey Awards Hall of Fame

== Bibliography ==
=== Charlton Comics ===
- Nature Boy #3, 5 (1956)

=== DC Comics ===
- Batman Gotham Knights (Batman Black and White) #7 (2000)
- Batman: No Man's Land Gallery (1999)
- Just Imagine Stan Lee with John Buscema Creating Superman, one-shot, (2001)
- Superman: Blood of My Ancestors, one-shot, (with Gil Kane) (2003, posthumous)

=== Dell Comics ===
- Four Color #684: Helen of Troy (1956), #762: The Sharkfighters; #775: Sir Lancelot and Brian, #794: The Count of Monte Cristo, #910: The Vikings, #927: Luke Short's Top Gun (adapted from novel Test Pit by Luke Short), #944: The 7th Voyage of Sinbad, #1006: Hercules, #1077, 1130: The Deputy, #1139: Spartacus (1956–1960)

=== Marvel Comics ===
- All-True Crime Cases #32 (1949)
- Amazing Adventures #1–2 (Black Widow) (1970)
- The Amazing Spider-Man #72–73, 76–81 (layouts only); #84–85 (1969–1970)
- Amazing Spider-Man 1999 #1 (1999)
- Astonishing Tales #9, 12 (Ka-Zar) (1971–1972)
- The Avengers #41–44, 46–47, 49–62, 74–77, 79–85, 94, 97, 105, 121, 124–125, 152–153, 255–279, 281–300, Annual #2 (backup story), 23 (1967–1989), #385 (with Mike Deodato) (1995)
- Bizarre Adventures #27, 29–30 (1981–1982)
- Captain America #115, 217 (1969–1978)
- Captain Britain #24–30 (Marvel UK) (1977)
- Captain Marvel #18 (with Gil Kane) (1969)
- Chamber of Darkness #1, 3 (1969–1970)
- Conan the Barbarian #25–36, 38–39, 41–56, 58–63, 65–68, 70–78, 84–86, 88–91, 93–126, 136, 140–144, 146–153, 155–159, 161–163, 165–179, 181–185, 187–190; Annual #2, 4, 5, 7 (1973–1987)
- Conan the Barbarian Movie Special #1–2 (1982)
- Conan the Destroyer #1–2 (1984)
- Conan the Savage #10 (1996)
- Conan: Death Covered in Gold #1–3 (1999)
- Cosmic Powers Unlimited #2–3 (1995)
- Cowboy Romances #1–3 (1949–1950)
- Crazy Magazine #2 (1974)
- Crimefighters #4–5, 7–8, 10 (1948–1949)
- Daredevil #136–137, 219 (1976–1985)
- Deadly Hands of Kung Fu Annual #1 (1974)
- Deathlok vol. 3 #10 (2000)
- Doc Savage, vol. 2, #1, 3 (1975–1976)
- Doom 2099 #39–40 (1996)
- Dracula Lives #3, 6 (1973–1974)
- Epic Illustrated #1 (Silver Surfer), #9, 11–13 (1980–1982)
- Faithful #1–2 (1949–1950)
- Fantastic Four #107–130, 132, 134–141, 160, 173–175, 202, 296–309, 416, Annual #11, Giant-Size #2, 4 (1971–1996)
- Fantastic Four 2099 #2 (1996)
- Francis, Brother of the Universe #1 (1980)
- Frankenstein #7–10 (1973–1974)
- Galactus The Devourer, miniseries, #2–6 (1999–2000)
- Giant-Size Super-Villain Team-Up #1 (1975)
- Girl Comics #1 (1949)
- Howard the Duck #3 (1976)
- Howard the Duck vol. 2 (1980)
- Hulk! #23 (1980)
- Justice #13 (1949)
- Ka-Zar #6–10 (1974–1975)
- King Conan #1–9, 17 (1980–1983)
- Kull the Conqueror, vol. 2, #1–3, 5–7, 9–10 (1982–1985)
- Lawbreakers Always Lose #3, 5, 9 (1948–1949)
- Lorna, the Jungle Queen #1 (1953)
- Love Trails #1 (1949)
- Lovers #30 (1950)
- Magik #1–2 (1983–1984)
- Man Comics #3–4 (1950)
- Man-Thing #12–13, 16 Giant-Size #2, 5 (1973–1974)
- Marvel Age Annual #4 (1988)
- Marvel Comics Presents #1–10, 38–47 (Wolverine) (1988–1990)
- Marvel Comics Super Special #1–2, 9, 11–13, 18, 21, 35, 40 (1977–1986)
- Marvel Fanfare #51, 53 (1990)
- Marvel Graphic Novel: Conan of the Isles SC (1989)
- Marvel Graphic Novel: Conan the Rogue SC (1991)
- Marvel Preview #22–23 (1980)
- Marvel Spotlight #30 (1976)
- Marvel Treasury Edition #23 (1979)
- Marvel Two-in-One #30 (1977)
- Marvel Tales #39 (1972)
- Master of Kung Fu #27 (1975)
- Mephisto #1–4 (1987)
- Monsters Unleashed #1–2, 4–5 (1973–1974)
- Ms. Marvel #1–3 (1977)
- My Love #1–7, 10, 18 (1969–1972)
- My Own Romance #67 (1959)
- Nova #1–2, 21 (1976–1978)
- Our Love Story #1–3, 5–7, 9, 16 (1969–1972)
- Punisher: A Man Named Frank #1 (1994)
- The Punisher Meets Archie #1 (with Stan Goldberg) (1994)
- The Punisher War Zone #23–30, Annual #1 (1993–1994)
- The Rampaging Hulk #1 (1977)
- Rangeland Love #1 (1949)
- Red Sonja #12–13, 15 (1978–1979)
- Romances of the West #1–2 (1949–1950)
- Rune/Silver Surfer #1 (1995)
- Savage She-Hulk #1 (1980)
- Savage Sword of Conan #1–5, 7, 10–13, 15–24, 26–28, 30–36, 38–43, 45, 47–58, 60–67, 70–74, 76–81, 87–88, 90–93, 95–96, 98–101, 190–200, 202–210, 222, 225, 234–235 (1974–1995)
- Savage Tales #1, 6–8 (Ka-Zar) (1971–1975)
- Savage Tales vol. 2 #6 (1986)
- Shadows & Light #3 (1998)
- Silver Surfer #1–17 (1968–1970)
- Silver Surfer vol. 3 #110 (1995)
- Silver Surfer: Judgment Day graphic novel (1988)
- The Spectacular Spider-Man #121 (among other artists) (1986)
- Squadron Supreme #7 (1986)
- Strange Tales #68, 150, 174 (1959–1974)
- Sub-Mariner #1–8, 20, 24 (1968–1970)
- Suspense #4 (1950)
- Tales of Suspense #1 (1959)
- Tales of the Zombie #1 (1973)
- Tales to Astonish #2; #85–87 (Hulk) (1959–1967)
- Tarzan #1–18, Annual #1 (1977–1978)
- Tex Morgan #4–7 (1949)
- Thor #178, 182–213, 215–226, 231–238, 241–253, 256–259, 272–278, 283–285, Annual #5, 8, 13 (1970–1985); #490 (1995)
- Thor vol. 2 #9 (1999)
- The Tomb of Dracula vol. 2 #4–5 (1980)
- Tower of Shadows #1–2 (1969)
- True Adventures #3 (1950)
- True Life Tales #1 (1949)
- True Secrets #3 (1950)
- Two Gun Western #5 (1950)
- Western Outlaws and Sheriffs #60, 62 (1949–1950)
- Western Winners #5 (1949)
- What If #13 (Conan); 15 (Nova) (1979)
- Wild Western #7–8 (1949)
- Wolverine #1–8, 10–16, 25, 27 (1988–1990)
- Wolverine: Bloody Choices SC (1991)
- Worlds Unknown #4 (1973)
- X-Men #42–43, 45 (1968) (cover-art only)
- Young Men #4–5 (1950)

=== Quality Comics ===
- Hollywood Secrets #6 (1950)

=== Simon & Schuster ===
- How to Draw Comics the Marvel Way, with Stan Lee, teaching book, Marvel Fireside Books, 1978, ISBN 978-0671530778

== Notes ==
| Preceded by Don Heck | The Avengers artist 1967–1969 | Succeeded by Gene Colan |
| Preceded by Neal Adams | Thor artist 1970–1977 | Succeeded by Walt Simonson |
| Preceded by John Romita Sr. | Fantastic Four artist 1971–1973 | Succeeded by Rich Buckler |
| Preceded by Barry Smith | Conan the Barbarian artist 1973–1987 | Succeeded by Val Semeiks |
| Preceded by n/a | Savage Sword of Conan artist 1974–1984 | Succeeded by Gary Kwapisz |
| Preceded by Walt Simonson | Thor artist 1978–1979 | Succeeded by Keith Pollard |
| Preceded by Bob Hall | Avengers artist 1985–1989 | Succeeded by Rich Buckler |
| Preceded by Jerry Ordway | Fantastic Four artist 1986–1987 | Succeeded by Keith Pollard |
| Preceded by Mike Docherty | Savage Sword of Conan artist 1991–1993 | Succeeded by Rafael Kayanan |
