= Dog Gone Modern =

1939 film by Charles Jones

- Directed by: Charles Jones
- Story by: Rich Hogan
- Produced by: Leon Schlesinger
- Music by: Carl W. Stalling
- Animation by: Phil Monroe
- Color process: Technicolor
- Production company: Leon Schlesinger Productions
- Distributed by: Warner Bros. Pictures; The Vitaphone Corporation
- Release date: January 14, 1939
- Running time: 7 min
- Country: United States
- Language: English

Dog Gone Modern is a 1939 American animated comedy short film directed by Charles Jones. The short was released on January 14, 1939. It is part of the Merrie Melodies series and the first cartoon to feature the Two Curious Puppies. It was re-released as a "Blue Ribbon" reissue in 1947, rendering the original film and credits to be lost. While deemed as one of Jones' lesser creations, the characters were popular enough to have most of their catalogue reissued outside of Dog Tired (1942).

== Plot ==
The Two Curious Puppies find a futuristic all-electric house on sale. They decide to enter after discovering how an eye scanner works and opening the door. The smaller puppy starts a demonstration of a robot which helps sweep cigar soot produced by another mechanism.

The larger puppy finds an electric dishwasher in the kitchen, which does not scare him unlike the other mechanisms. The smaller puppy presses another button despite the sign's warnings, which scares him into slamming into the larger puppy in the kitchen, causing the larger puppy to be washed instead, despite the button doing nothing of value. The larger puppy spends the remainder of the film being washed repeatedly after being launched in some form. The smaller puppy presses another button and is folded like a napkin in painful fashion. In an attempt to get the metal ring off his legs, he slams into a vase, which breaks and frees him. The smaller puppy is delighted by a dog bone dispenser, only for the sweeping robot to return and sweep it like trash. The smaller puppy fails to chase him into its room, but stops near a piano which plays itself. Numerous instruments accompany the music while popping up near the puppy on top. The smaller puppy finds the bone in the robot's room, but is chased by the robot when it finds out. He rides a flying carpet and catches the larger puppy while flying into the garbage disposal. The smaller puppy incapacitates the robot with a mallet, but the larger puppy steals his bone as retribution for his torture.

== Home media ==
The short is available on disc 1 of the Looney Tunes Collector's Vault: Volume 3 Blu-ray set.

== See also ==
- House Hunting Mice
- The House of Tomorrow (1949 film)
