= Robin Riggs =

British comic book artist

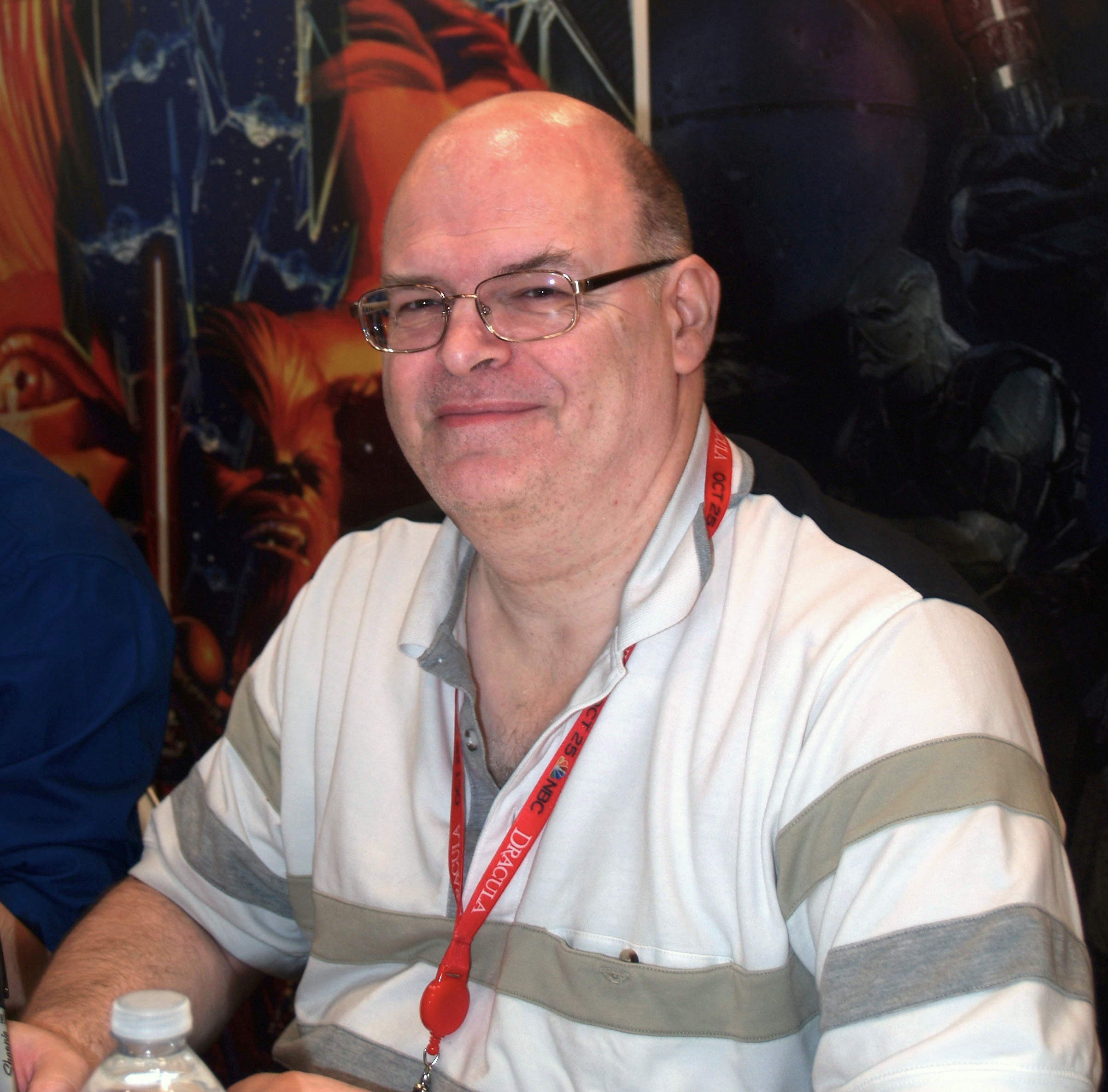
- Riggs at the 2013 New York Comic Con
- Area: Inker

Robin Riggs is a British-born comic book artist. The majority of his published work has involved working as an inker for Marvel Comics and DC Comics.

== Career ==
Riggs' first professional comics work was as a result of winning the "Marvel Try-out Book" in the 1980s for lettering; prior to that, he had already been working as a graphic artist for several years.

Early work consisted of inking a lot of the Marvel UK titles during their expansion into the American market, including both Genetix series

His 2008 projects include providing the art for a five-issue "Sir Apropos of Nothing" story written by Peter David and published by IDW Publishing.

== Personal life ==
Riggs is married to Elayne Riggs, who has appeared with her husband at conventions.

== Bibliography ==
- Captain Planet and the Planeteers #6 (inks, with author Pat Kelleher and pencils by Dave Taylor, Marvel Comics, 1992)
- Genetix (Marvel UK):
  - Codename: Genetix (1993)
  - Genetix (1993–1994)
- Death's Head II #5, 14 (Marvel UK, 1993, 1994)
- Super Soldiers #8 (Marvel UK, 1993)
- Cyberspace 3000 #6 (Marvel UK, 1993)
- Death Wreck #1 (Marvel UK, 1994)
- X-Men Unlimited #5-7 (Marvel Comics, 1994)
- The Incredible Hulk #425-432, 436–446 (Marvel Comics, 1995–1996)
- Supergirl: Louder Than Words #65 (with Leonard Kirk DC Comics, 2002)
- Suicide Squad: Raise the Flag (DC Comics, 2007–2008)
- Tangent: Superman's Reign #2-5 (DC Comics, 2008)
