= Marvel Try-out Book =

Try-out book

The Official Marvel Comics Try-Out Book
- Cover for the original 1983 edition, showing the various stages of comic book creation, from pencils, to inks, to colors.
- Date: 1983
- Main characters: Spider-Man
- Publisher: Marvel Comics

Creative team
- Writers: Jim Shooter
- Pencillers: John Romita, Jr.

Original publication
- Language: English
- ISBN: 0939766760

The Official Marvel Comics Try-Out Book is an oversize book originally published by Marvel Comics in 1983. Conceived by then-Editor-in-Chief Jim Shooter, the book was in the form of a contest encouraging up-and-coming comics creators to try their hand at getting a job with the company. The winner would be awarded a professional assignment with Marvel.

The book described the respective jobs and accompanying tools of a writer, penciller, inker, letterer, and colorist, and then provided pages ready for the hopeful cartoonist to work on. An unfinished Spider-Man story (titled "Personals") was the springboard for the try-out portion, which among other features contained blank, pre-ruled pages for pencilers, pre-penciled "non-photo blue" pages (by artist John Romita, Jr.) to be inked and lettered, and completed black-and-white pages to be colored. The entire book was printed on two-ply 11" × 17" paper, replicating the size that typical original comic book art was drawn at before it was photographically reduced to print size.

== Publication history ==
Though the book was published in 1983, the contest winners were not announced until 1986. The initial winners were:

- Plotter and scripter: Chuck Duffie
- Penciller: Mark Bagley
- Inker: Doug Hazlewood
- Colorist: P. Jeanine Pasda
- Letterer: Robin Riggs

For their outstanding entries, the winners received a commemorative certificate. They were also promised "their first regular professional assignment, which will be finishing the Spider-Man story 'Personals' which was begun in the Try-Out Book. The result of their labors will be published next spring in a special giant-sized issue of The Amazing Spider-Man". That promised issue was never published, but artist Bagley is now a well-known penciller who would go on to have an extended run on Amazing Spider-Man in the 1990s and then Ultimate Spider-Man with Brian Michael Bendis in the 2000s. Inker Hazlewood has had a steady career, mostly for DC Comics, since the late 1980s. Duffie and Pasda have yet to see their work in print.

=== 1996 edition ===
In 1996 a new edition of The Marvel Try-Out Book was released, edited by Marvel Submissions Editor John Lewandowski and featuring an introduction by Bagley. The New Official Marvel Try-Out Book #2 maintains the same overall format as the original, but features an X-Men story drawn by Andy Kubert. In addition, the new version takes into account advances in computer technology in the production of comics. Other changes include fewer pencilled pages to ink over than in the original book, which are printed in black ink rather than "non-photo blue". This means inkers must use tracing paper rather than being able to ink directly on the art.

== Charles Burns derivative ==
In 1991, Charles Burns's reworking of the pages in the Try-Out Book, titled "Naked Snack", was published in issues #2 and 3 of the Kitchen Sink anthology Buzz. The story featured dinosaurs and cannibalism.

== See also ==
- Script (comics)
- Penciller
- Inker
- Letterer
- Colorist
