= The Mighty Marvel Comics Strength and Fitness Book =

1976 comic book

Stan Lee Presents: The Mighty Marvel Comics Strength and Fitness Book is a 1976 comic book set in the Marvel Universe that details exercise and fitness techniques. It was written by "Agile" Ann Picardo and illustrated by "Jumpin'" Joe Giella, with Stan Lee adding some dialogue.

Marvel characters explain and demonstrate different aspects of fitness and health in each section of the book. The Human Torch introduces warm-up exercises, Mister Fantastic covers stretching, the Silver Surfer goes over posture and balance, Spider-Man takes on agility and climbing techniques, Sub-Mariner and Ghost Rider take turns with swimming and bicycling, the Hulk shows basic weightlifting with dumbbells (continued later by Luke Cage, with more advanced barbell exercises), Thor demonstrates strength and endurance exercises, Invisible Girl explains calories and taking stock of one's diet, Captain America and Falcon team up for some buddy exercises and games, Medusa gives beauty and toning tips (including the use of a slant board and isometric exercises), and the Thing performs "Bashful's Brutish Bottom Basher", as part of a chapter about "trouble spots" and dealing with being overweight. Even J. Jonah Jameson takes a turn, with a set of relaxation and calmness exercises.
