= Two-ply =

In comics, the term two-ply refers to pre-bordered boards of 11 inches by 17 inches, commonly used by a comic book penciller in the creating of the individual pages for comic books. They often have a marked off art area which is 10 inches by 15 inches, which is the actual size of original comic book art. This format is larger than a printed comic page, and will get scaled down before it sees publication in a comic book.

The term 'ply' comes from the fact that the drawing board consists of two interwoven layers, resulting in a thickness made up of two layers or strands. It is sometimes referred to as a Bristol board or as Bristol paper.
