= Nature Boy (comics) =

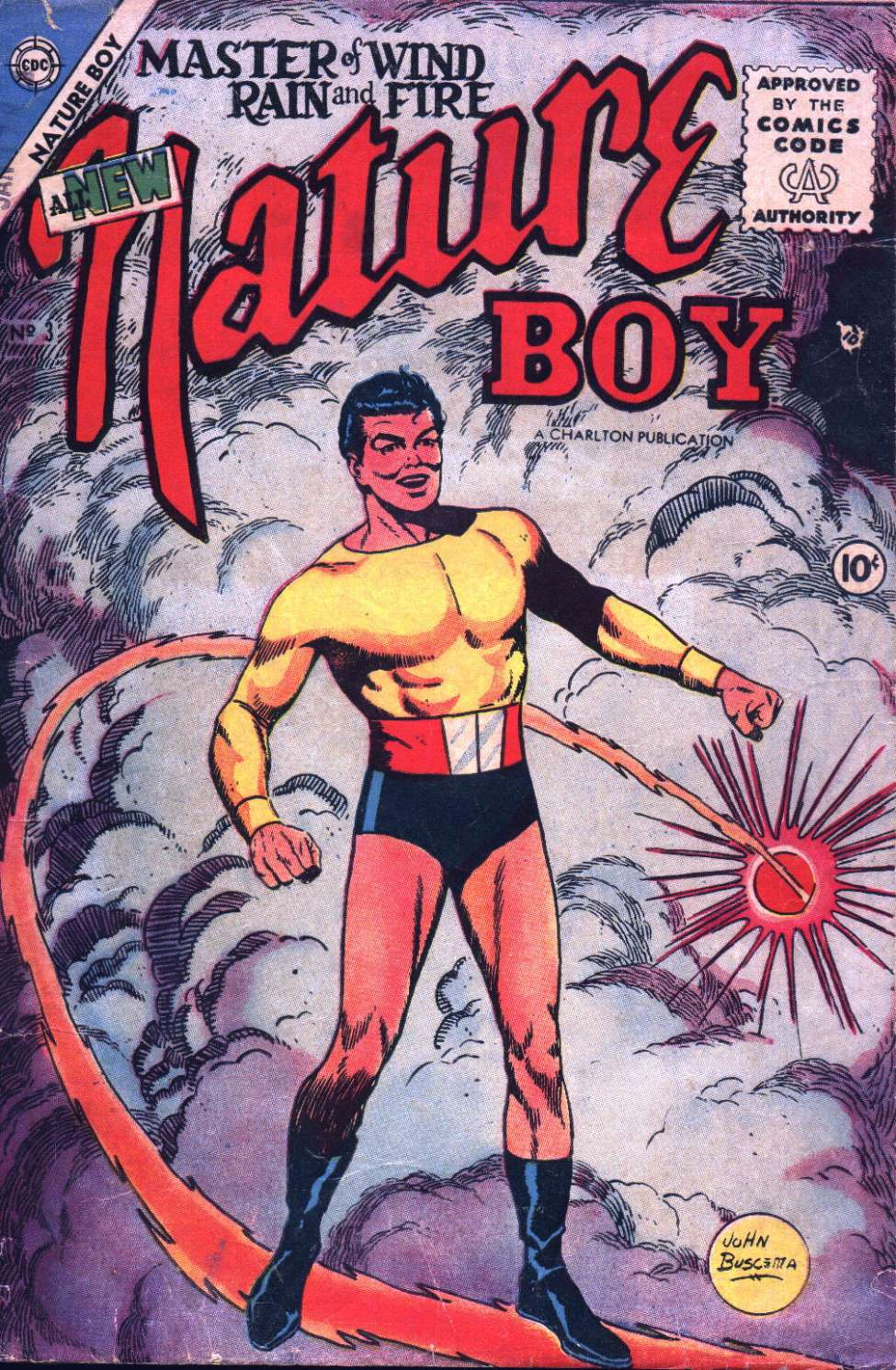
- Cover of Nature Boy #3 (March 1956), art by John Buscema

Publication information
- Publisher: Charlton Comics
- First appearance: Nature Boy #3 (Mar. 1956)
- Created by: Jerry Siegel; John Buscema

In-story information
- Alter ego: David Crandall
- Abilities: Powers of the elements: water, wind, fire, earth, love, air, electricity

Nature Boy is a superhero created by Jerry Siegel and drawn by John Buscema and others. He first appeared in Nature Boy #3 (March 1956), published by Charlton Comics.

== Publication history ==
Nature Boy was Charlton's attempt at gauging the strength of the superhero market (they did the same thing with the romance market by introducing Brides in Love). Nature Boy ran for only three issues, #3–5 (March 1956 – February 1957). (In a practice common at Charlton, the title took over the numbering of another title, Danny Blaze. After three issues of Nature Boy, the title changed again, this time to Li'l Rascal Twins.)

In issue #3 (March, 1956), Nature Man appeared, a grown-up version of Nature Boy. In issue #5 (Feb, 1957), a Nature Girl appeared in her own story.

A Nature Boy story was reprinted in AC Comics's Men of Mystery #41 (2003).

== Fictional character biography ==
Nature Boy is really David Crandall, son of a wealthy family. When he is lost at sea, he is saved from drowning by the gods who rule each of the elements, who endow him with their powers:

- Neptune – water
- Gusto – winds
- Fura – fire
- Eartha – earth
- Allura – love
- Azura – the skies
- Electra – electricity
- Friga – the cold

Returned to his parents, he grows up to become the heroic Nature Boy, and uses his powers to fight crime.
