= Bushy Hare =

1950 film directed by Robert McKimson

- Directed by: Robert McKimson
- Story by: Warren Foster
- Starring: Mel Blanc
- Music by: Carl Stalling
- Animation by: Phil De Lara; J.C. Melendez; Charles McKimson; Rod Scribner; John Carey
- Layouts by: Cornett Wood
- Backgrounds by: Richard H. Thomas
- Color process: Technicolor
- Production company: Warner Bros. Cartoons
- Distributed by: Warner Bros. Pictures
- Release date: November 18, 1950
- Running time: 7:15
- Country: United States
- Language: English

Bushy Hare is a 1950 Warner Bros. Looney Tunes cartoon directed by Robert McKimson. The short was released on November 18, 1950, and stars Bugs Bunny.

Bugs winds up in the Australian Outback, where he is switched with a baby kangaroo and has to deal with an Aboriginal hunter. The title is a play on "bushy hair" along with Aboriginal people stereotypically being from "the bush" country.

The baby kangaroo is played by Hippety Hopper, in a cameo appearance. This is the only cartoon in which Hippety Hopper is not paired with Sylvester the Cat, and the only one in which the character speaks (with one line at the end). Like Bugs, Hippety is voiced by Mel Blanc.

== Plot ==
Bugs Bunny and Nature Boy

Bugs pops out in Golden Gate Park and encounters a balloon salesman, who asks Bugs to hold his balloons while he ties his shoelaces. Bugs complies, but soon finds himself lifted in the air by the balloons and drifting off over the ocean. Eventually he clashes in midair with a stork delivering a kangaroo joey, leading to Bugs getting switched with the joey, brought to Australia, and dropped into a mother kangaroo's arms. Bugs refuses to be the kangaroo's baby, but feels guilty after the kangaroo starts crying and agrees to be its 'baby'.

After a wild ride inside the kangaroo's pouch, Bugs gets out and is then struck by a boomerang thrown by an aborigine, whom Bugs later calls "Nature Boy". Bugs throws the boomerang away but it returns and hits him again. Nature Boy confronts Bugs, who teases him into a yelling fit. Nature Boy throws his spear at Bugs, who runs and dives into a rabbit hole. Bugs tricks Nature Boy into thinking he's stabbing the rabbit down the hole, then kicks the man down into the hole.

Later Nature Boy spies Bugs walking and attempts to shoot a poisonous fruit at him through a bamboo blowgun, but as he inhales, Bugs blows through the other end, causing the man to ingest the fruit instead. Nature Boy then chases Bugs, who gets into the front of a canoe and rows off. He soon realizes Nature Boy is in the back of the same canoe and then they row into a tunnel. A moment later they come out another tunnel in each other's arms: Bugs says, "Gosh, Nature, I didn't know you cared." Nature Boy flies into a rage and chases Bugs up a cliff where the two of dive into the kangaroo's pouch and fight. Finally, Bugs kicks Nature Boy out and the kangaroo kicks him off of the cliff. Then, the joey floats down from the sky into his mother's pouch.

The kangaroo gives Bugs a ride back to the US, using an outboard motor to power the kangaroo across the sea.

== Reception ==
The Film Daily called the short a "wonderful cartoon for all ages" on July 22, 1950. On November 18, 1950 Boxoffice said, "This is a wealth of imagination and is really funny."

== Home media ==
"Bushy Hare" was released on the single-disc Bugs Bunny: Hare Extraordinaire DVD released in August 2010.

Preceded by Bunker Hill Bunny	Bugs Bunny Cartoons; 1950	Succeeded by Rabbit of Seville
