= Greg Ford (animator) =

American animator, director, historian and consultant to Warner Bros

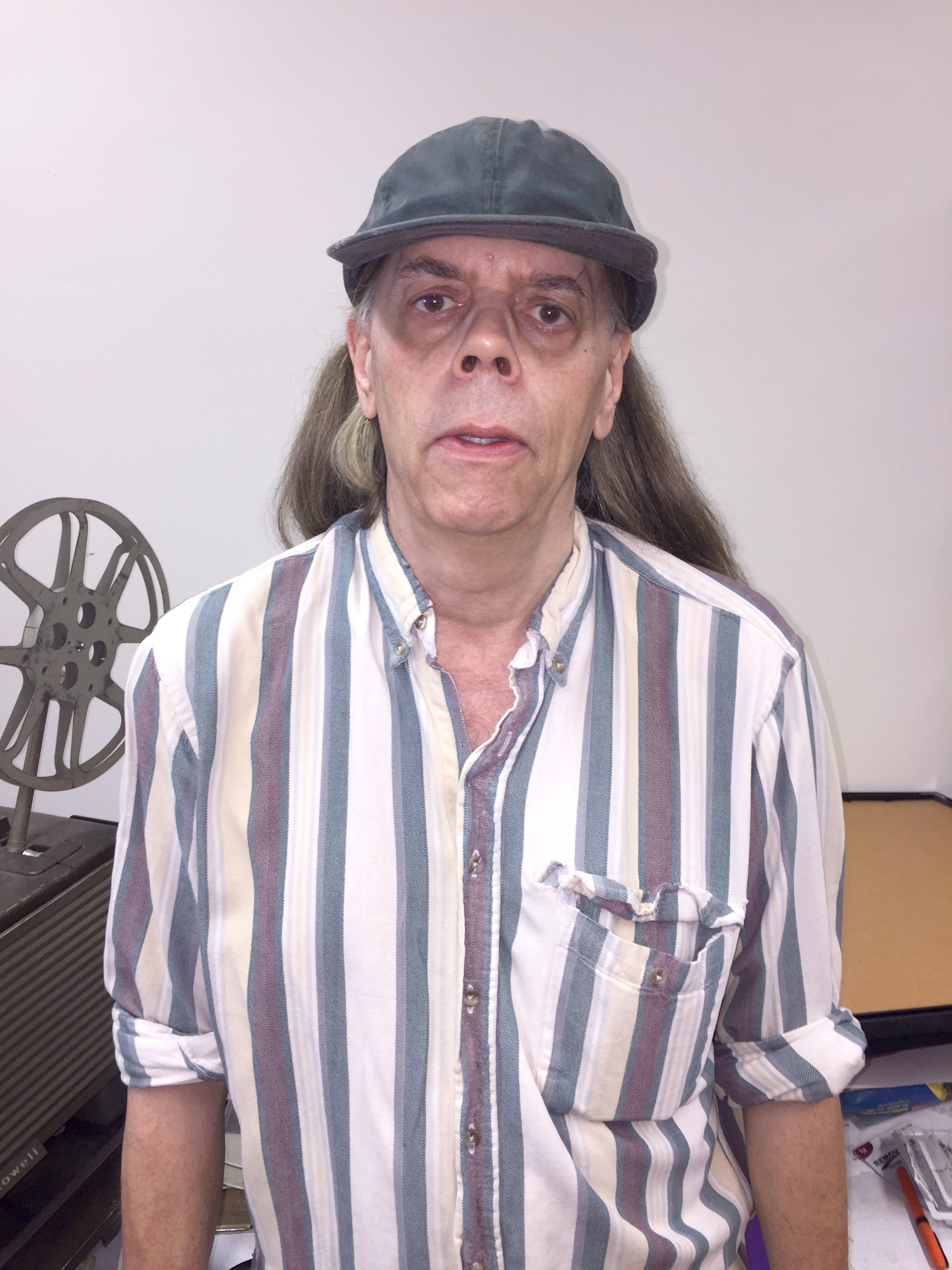
Greg Ford in 2016

Greg Ford is an American animator, director, historian and consultant to Warner Bros. Animation. He is perhaps best known for directing the films Daffy Duck's Quackbusters and (Blooper) Bunny.

== Biography ==
During the 1960s and 1970s, he interviewed many of the key people responsible for Warner Bros.' success during The Golden Age of American animation (including Chuck Jones and Friz Freleng), and was given "special thanks" for working on the documentary film Bugs Bunny: Superstar, before officially joining the staff at Warner Bros. Animation in 1985. He teamed with director Terry Lennon on several theatrical shorts, television specials, and documentaries.

== Filmography ==
In 1988, he and Terry Lennon directed the well-received compilation film Daffy Duck's Quackbusters. Exploring the vaults of the WB studio, Ford discovered master tapes of the Milt Franklyn and Carl Stalling recording sessions for several Looney Tunes of the late 1940s and 1950s. This material would serve as the basis for the two-volume CD set of The Carl Stalling Project, co-produced with Hal Willner.

In the early 1990s, Greg Ford continued actively contributing to Warner Bros. animation history. For example, he (again, along with Terry Lennon), directed and produced the cult classic (Blooper) Bunny (1991), which has garnered a huge following among animation fans for its edgy humor.

Starting in 2003, Greg Ford serves as a consultant and contributor to the Looney Tunes Golden Collection DVD box set series, conducting many audio commentaries and helping in the production of many bonus features.

Greg Ford is a particular champion for the works of Friz Freleng, Tex Avery, Chuck Jones and Bob Clampett.

== Personal life ==
He was married to film critic Ronnie Scheib (1944 - 4 Oct 2015). They preserved old film prints at their Crosby Street apartment before its destruction by fire in 2010.
