= Looney Tunes and Merrie Melodies filmography (1940–1949) =

A total of 306 theatrical animated shorts were released by Warner Bros. Pictures under the Looney Tunes (LT) and Merrie Melodies (MM) banners between the years of 1940 and 1949. All cartoons were scored by Carl W. Stalling.

== Series overview ==
Year	Shorts	Originally released	
Year	Shorts	First released	Last released
1940	39	January 6, 1940	December 21, 1940
1941	41	January 4, 1941	December 27, 1941
1942	39	January 3, 1942	December 12, 1942
1943	28	January 16, 1943	December 23, 1943
1944	27	January 4, 1944	December 30, 1944
1945	18	January 6, 1945	December 18, 1945
1946	25	January 5, 1946	November 23, 1946
1947	22	January 18, 1947	December 13, 1947
1948	33	January 3, 1948	December 18, 1948
1949	34	January 1, 1949	December 31, 1949

== 1940 ==
No. overall	No. in year	Title	Series	Directed by	Animated by	Recurring characters	Original release date	Official DVD/Blu-Ray Availability
272	1	The Early Worm Gets the Bird	MM	Tex Avery	Robert Cannon	N/A (one-shot cartoon)	January 6, 1940 (earliest known date)	N/A
One of three young birds in the Blackbird family wakes up at 5 a.m. to catch a worm. Story by Jack Miller
273	2	Africa Squeaks	LT	Bob Clampett	John Carey & Dave Hoffman	Porky Pig	January 27, 1940	DVD: Porky Pig 101
A "spot gag" cartoon set in continental Africa parodying the movie Stanley and Livingstone, with Porky Pig leading a tribe of Africans.
274	3	Mighty Hunters	MM	Chuck Jones	Ken Harris	N/A (one-shot cartoon)	January 27, 1940	N/A
An adaptation of Jimmy Swinnerton's Canyon Kiddies from Good Housekeeping. Story by Dave Monahan
275	4	Busy Bakers	MM	Ben Hardaway & Cal Dalton	Richard Bickenbach	N/A (one-shot cartoon)	February 10, 1940	DVD: Brother Orchid (extra, unrestored)
A local town baker is afraid of going out of business, so he gives a kind deed to an old man to keep his bakery running. Story by Jack Miller
276	5	Ali-Baba Bound	LT	Bob Clampett	Vive Risto	Porky Pig	February 10, 1940	DVD: Porky Pig 101
Porky Pig receives a message from Tattle Tale Gray about an attack on a fort in the Sahara Desert. Story by Melvin Millar
277	6	Elmer's Candid Camera	MM	Chuck Jones	Robert McKimson	Elmer Fudd; Bugs Bunny (prototype)	March 2, 1940	DVD: Golden Collection: Vol. 1 DVD: The Essential Bugs Bunny; Blu-Ray/DVD: Platinum Collection: Vol. 2 Blu-Ray: Bugs Bunny 80th Anniversary Collection
Elmer Fudd wants to take a picture of a rabbit with his camera, but the rabbit evades him from doing so. Story by Rich Hogan Notes: First appearance of Elmer Fudd's redesign.; First cartoon where Elmer Fudd is voiced by Arthur Q. Bryan.
278	7	Pilgrim Porky	LT	Bob Clampett	Norman McCabe	Porky Pig	March 16, 1940	DVD: Golden Collection: Vol. 5 DVD: Porky Pig 101
Porky Pig leads the pilgrims from Plymouth to America. Story by Warren Foster
279	8	Cross Country Detours	MM	Tex Avery	Paul Smith	N/A (one-shot cartoon)	March 16, 1940	Blu-Ray: Collector's Choice: Vol. 2
A "spot gag" cartoon involving the wonders of nature in the United States. Story by Rich Hogan
280	9	Confederate Honey	MM	Friz Freleng	Cal Dalton	Elmer Fudd	March 30, 1940	DVD: Virginia City (extra, unrestored & censored)
Elmer Fudd plays Ned Cutler, who participates in the American Civil War in 1861. Story by Ben Hardaway
281	10	The Bear's Tale	MM	Tex Avery	Rod Scribner	N/A (one-shot cartoon)	April 13, 1940	DVD: Golden Collection: Vol. 5
A comical recreation of "Goldilocks and the Three Bears" crossing over with "Little Red Riding Hood". Story by Ben Hardaway
282	11	Slap Happy Pappy	LT	Bob Clampett	John Carey & Isadore Ellis	Porky Pig; Jack Bunny	April 13, 1940	DVD: Porky Pig 101
Most of Eddie Cackler's children that hatch out of the eggs on Porky Pig's farm are girls, he has no luck of having a son.
283	12	Porky's Poor Fish	LT	Bob Clampett	Dave Hoffman	Porky Pig	April 27, 1940	DVD: Golden Collection: Vol. 4 DVD: Porky Pig 101
While the fish store's owner Porky Pig is out to lunch, the fish attempt to attack a cat that enters the store. Story by Melvin Millar
284	13	The Hardship of Miles Standish	MM	Friz Freleng	Gil Turner	Elmer Fudd	April 27, 1940	N/A
Elmer Fudd plays messenger John Alden, who must give a letter to Miles Standish's love interest Priscilla Mullins while avoiding Indians that attack her house. Story by Jack Miller
285	14	Sniffles Takes a Trip	MM	Chuck Jones	Phil Monroe	Sniffles	May 11, 1940	DVD: Golden Collection: Vol. 6 (extra, unrestored); Blu-Ray/DVD: Mouse Chronicles (restored)
Sniffles goes into the countryside hoping to enjoy nature there and escape city life. Story by Dave Monahan
286	15	You Ought to Be in Pictures	LT	Friz Freleng	Herman Cohen	Daffy Duck; Porky Pig	May 18, 1940	DVD: Golden Collection: Vol. 2 Blu-Ray/DVD: Platinum Collection: Vol. 2 DVD: Porky Pig 101
Daffy Duck wants to be the top star of Warner Bros. Cartoons, so he tricks Porky Pig into asking Leon Schlesinger to release him from his contract. But Porky finds himself a stranger around the rest of the studio lot. Story by Jack Miller
287	16	A Gander at Mother Goose	MM	Tex Avery	Charles McKimson	N/A (one-shot cartoon)	May 25, 1940	DVD: Golden Collection: Vol. 5
A "spot gag" cartoon involving classic nursery rhymes. Story by Dave Monahan
288	17	Tom Thumb in Trouble	MM	Chuck Jones	Robert Cannon	N/A (one-shot cartoon)	June 8, 1940	DVD: Golden Collection: Vol. 5
Tom Thumb falls in water while his father is away, and a bird saves him. Tom's father mistakenly believes that the little bird who has just rescued his tiny son from drowning in the dishwater is attacking the boy and drives it away. Tom sets off to find the bird and gets lost in a fierce snowstorm. Story by Rich Hogan
289	18	The Chewin' Bruin	LT	Bob Clampett	Norman McCabe & Vive Risto	Porky Pig	June 8, 1940	DVD: Porky Pig 101
Porky Pig sits on an old dog's lap and listens to the story of the mounted bear head on the wall behind them.
290	19	Circus Today	MM	Tex Avery	Sid Sutherland	N/A (one-shot cartoon)	June 22, 1940	Blu-Ray: It All Came True (extra, restored)
A "spot gag" cartoon set in a circus. Story by Jack Miller
291	20	Little Blabbermouse	MM	Friz Freleng	Richard Bickenbach	Little Blabbermouse; W.C. Field Mouse	July 6, 1940	Blu-Ray/DVD: Mouse Chronicles (extra, unrestored); Blu-Ray: Collector's Vault: Vol. 2 (restored)
W.C. Field Mouse leads tours of a drugstore for other mice, including Little Blabbermouse. Story by Ben Hardaway
292	21	Porky's Baseball Broadcast	LT	Friz Freleng	Cal Dalton	Porky Pig	July 6, 1940	DVD: Porky Pig 101
A "spot gag" cartoon set in a baseball stadium with Porky Pig broadcasting a game between Giants and Red Sox. Story by Ben Hardaway
293	22	The Egg Collector	MM	Chuck Jones	Rudy Larriva	Sniffles; The Bookworm	July 20, 1940	Blu-Ray/DVD: Mouse Chronicles
Sniffles reads a book titled "Egg Collecting For Amateurs" and takes the Bookworm to an old church to steal an owl egg. Story by Bob Givens
294	23	A Wild Hare	MM	Tex Avery	Virgil Ross	Bugs Bunny; Elmer Fudd	July 27, 1940	DVD: Golden Collection: Vol. 3 (extra, unrestored); DVD: Golden Collection: Vol. 4 (extra, unrestored); DVD: Warner Bros. Home Entertainment Academy Awards Animation Collection (restored); DVD: The Essential Bugs Bunny (restored); Blu-Ray/DVD: Platinum Collection: Vol. 2 (restored); Blu-Ray: Bugs Bunny 80th Anniversary Collection (restored)
Elmer Fudd goes out into the forest hunting for rabbits, but Bugs Bunny (in what is considered by Warner Bros. his official debut) evades him from shooting him. Story by Rich Hogan Note: Nominated for the Academy Award for Best Animated Short Film in 1941.
295	24	Ghost Wanted	MM	Chuck Jones	Robert McKimson	N/A (one-shot cartoon)	August 10, 1940	Blu-Ray: Collector's Choice: Vol. 2
A little ghost tries out for the house-haunting job at 1313 Dracula Drive, but gets scared by a bigger ghost. Story by Dave Monahan
296	25	Patient Porky	LT	Bob Clampett	Norman McCabe	Porky Pig	August 24, 1940	DVD: Golden Collection: Vol. 5 (restored); DVD: Porky Pig 101 (unrestored)
Porky Pig visits a hospital with a stomach ache from overeating at his birthday party. A cat poses as "Dr. Chilled-Air" and attempts surgery on Porky. Story by Warren Foster
297	26	Ceiling Hero	MM	Tex Avery	Rod Scribner	N/A (one-shot cartoon)	August 24, 1940	Blu-Ray: Stranger on the Third Floor (extra, restored)
A "spot gag" cartoon featuring the latest developments of modern flying in science. Story by Dave Monahan
298	27	Malibu Beach Party	MM	Friz Freleng	Gil Turner	N/A (one-shot cartoon)	September 14, 1940	DVD: Dance, Girl, Dance (extra, unrestored & uncensored)
A parody of the popular radio and TV comedy series The Jack Benny Program set on the Malibu beach. Story by Jack Miller
299	28	Calling Dr. Porky	LT	Friz Freleng	Herman Cohen	Porky Pig	September 21, 1940	DVD: Porky Pig 101
Porky Pig is a medical doctor who cures patients at New Rightus Hospital. Story by Jack Miller
300	29	Stage Fright	MM	Chuck Jones	Ken Harris	The Two Curious Puppies	September 28, 1940	DVD: City for Conquest (extra, unrestored); Blu-Ray: Mr. and Mrs. Smith (extra, restored)
The Two Curious Puppies chase each other into a vaudeville theater after hours. Story by Rich Hogan
301	30	Prehistoric Porky	LT	Bob Clampett	John Carey	Porky Pig	October 12, 1940	DVD: Golden Collection: Vol. 5 DVD: Porky Pig 101
Porky Pig attempts to kill a bear in the year "One Billion, Trillion B.C." Story by Melvin Millar
302	31	Holiday Highlights	MM	Tex Avery	Charles McKimson	N/A (one-shot cartoon)	October 12, 1940	DVD: Bugs Bunny's Cupid Capers (extra, unrestored); Blu-Ray: Mr. and Mrs. Smith (extra, restored)
A "spot gag" cartoon featuring holiday-related gags. Story by Dave Monahan
303	32	Good Night Elmer	MM	Chuck Jones	Phil Monroe	Elmer Fudd	October 26, 1940	Blu-Ray: Collector's Vault: Vol. 1
Elmer Fudd attempts to extinguish a candle by his bedside so he can retire for the night. Story by Rich Hogan
304	33	The Sour Puss	LT	Bob Clampett	Vive Risto & Dave Hoffman	Porky Pig	November 2, 1940	DVD: Golden Collection: Vol. 4 DVD: Porky Pig 101
Porky Pig excitedly plans a fishing trip with his pet cat, promising fish for dinner. Story by Warren Foster
305	34	Wacky Wild Life	MM	Tex Avery	Virgil Ross	N/A (one-shot cartoon)	November 9, 1940	Blu-Ray: Stranger on the Third Floor (extra, restored)
A "spot gag" cartoon featuring gags involving animals living in the wild. Story by Dave Monahan
306	35	Bedtime for Sniffles	MM	Chuck Jones	Robert Cannon	Sniffles	November 23, 1940	Blu-Ray/DVD: Mouse Chronicles
Sniffles tries to stay awake and wait up to see Santa Claus on Christmas Eve. However, the waste of Sniffles' energy causes him to feel sleepy. Story by Rich Hogan
307	36	Porky's Hired Hand	LT	Friz Freleng	Richard Bickenbach	Porky Pig	November 30, 1940	DVD: Porky Pig 101
Porky Pig hires slow-witted assistant Gregory Grunt to help him prevent the marauding Fox from attempting to grab chickens from his ranch on the farm. Story by Dave Monahan
308	37	Of Fox and Hounds	MM	Tex Avery	Charles McKimson	Willoughby	December 7, 1940	Blu-Ray: Collector's Vault: Vol. 1
Dim-witted dog Willoughby repeatedly asks sly fox George where the fox went, never suspecting that his "friend" George is the fox. Story by Dave Monahan
309	38	The Timid Toreador	LT	Bob Clampett & Norman McCabe	Isadore Ellis	Porky Pig	December 21, 1940	DVD: Porky Pig 101
Porky Pig works as a tamale salesman in Mexico, eventually feeding most of the tamales to Slapsie Maxie Rosenbull at a stadium. Story by Melvin Millar
310	39	Shop Look & Listen	MM	Friz Freleng	Cal Dalton	Little Blabbermouse; W.C. Field Mouse	December 21, 1940	Blu-Ray/DVD: Mouse Chronicles (extra, unrestored)
Little Blabbermouse takes a tour of the J.T. Gimlet department store. Story by Dave Monahan

== 1941 ==
From this year onward, story credits are fully implemented unless otherwise noted.

No. overall	No. in year	Title	Series	Directed by	Story by	Animated by	Recurring characters	Original release date	Official DVD/Blu-Ray Availability
311	1	Elmer's Pet Rabbit	MM	Chuck Jones	Rich Hogan	Rudy Larriva	Bugs Bunny; Elmer Fudd	January 4, 1941	Blu-Ray: Collector's Choice: Vol. 3
Elmer Fudd gets Bugs Bunny as a pet.
312	2	Porky's Snooze Reel	LT	Bob Clampett & Norman McCabe	Warren Foster	John Carey	Porky Pig	January 11, 1941	DVD: Porky Pig 101 (unrestored); Blu-Ray: My Favorite Wife (extra, restored)
A "spot gag" newsreel parody hosted by Porky Pig.
313	3	The Fighting 69th½	MM	Friz Freleng	Jack Miller	Gil Turner	N/A (one-shot cartoon)	January 18, 1941	DVD: Golden Collection: Vol. 6 (extra, unrestored)
A couple has a picnic in a peaceful forest. When they leave, red ants and black ants declare war on each other over the picnic basket.
314	4	Sniffles Bells the Cat	MM	Chuck Jones	Rich Hogan	Ken Harris	Sniffles	February 1, 1941	Blu-Ray/DVD: Mouse Chronicles
Sniffles is volunteered by his friends to bell a troublesome cat.
315	5	The Haunted Mouse	LT	Tex Avery	Michael Maltese	Sid Sutherland	N/A (one-shot cartoon)	February 15, 1941	N/A
A starving cat enters a house haunted by a ghostly mouse.
316	6	The Crackpot Quail	MM	Tex Avery	Rich Hogan	Robert McKimson	Willoughby	February 15, 1941	Blu-Ray/DVD: Tex Avery Screwball Classics: Vol. 3 (extra, restored)
Willoughby the dog goes hunting for quail.
317	7	The Cat's Tale	MM	Friz Freleng	Michael Maltese	Herman Cohen	N/A (one-shot cartoon)	March 1, 1941	N/A
A frustrated mouse is sick and tired of being chased, so he orders a cowardly cat to stop. He convinces the cat to tell a bulldog named Spike to quit chasing him as well.
318	8	Joe Glow, the Firefly	LT	Chuck Jones	Rich Hogan	Phil Monroe	N/A (one-shot cartoon)	March 8, 1941	Blu-Ray: Collector's Vault: Vol. 3
A fly carrying a lamp named Joe Glow investigates Chuck Jones' tent.
319	9	Tortoise Beats Hare	MM	Tex Avery	Dave Monahan	Charles McKimson	Bugs Bunny; Cecil Turtle	March 15, 1941	DVD: Golden Collection: Vol. 2 Blu-Ray/DVD: Platinum Collection: Vol. 2
Bugs Bunny competes against Cecil Turtle in a race.
320	10	Porky's Bear Facts	LT	Friz Freleng	Michael Maltese	Manuel Perez	Porky Pig	March 29, 1941	DVD: Porky Pig 101
In an adaptation of the Aesop fable "The Ant and the Grasshopper", a bear is starving in the winter, so he tries to find food, eventually ending up being invited by his neighbor Porky Pig.
321	11	Goofy Groceries	MM	Bob Clampett	Melvin Millar	Vive Risto	Jack Bunny	March 29, 1941	DVD: Golden Collection: Vol. 3
Mascots on the labels of food products come to life in a closed grocery store one winter night.
322	12	Toy Trouble	MM	Chuck Jones	Rich Hogan	Robert Cannon	Sniffles; The Bookworm	April 12, 1941	Blu-Ray/DVD: Mouse Chronicles
Sniffles and the Bookworm turn on all of the toys in a toy store.
323	13	Porky's Preview	LT	Tex Avery	Dave Monahan	Virgil Ross	Porky Pig	April 19, 1941	DVD: Golden Collection: Vol. 5 DVD: Porky Pig 101
Porky Pig presents a film he made himself at a movie theater.
324	14	The Trial of Mr. Wolf	MM	Friz Freleng	Michael Maltese	Richard Bickenbach	N/A (one-shot cartoon)	April 26, 1941	DVD: Golden Collection: Vol. 5
Mr. Wolf gives his testimony: an adaptation of "Little Red Riding Hood".
325	15	Porky's Ant	LT	Chuck Jones	Rich Hogan	Rudy Larriva	Porky Pig	May 10, 1941	DVD: Porky Pig 101
Porky Pig goes on safari to find the rare pygmy ant of Central Africa which is valued at $150,000.
326	16	Farm Frolics	MM	Bob Clampett	Warren Foster	John Carey & Isadore Ellis	N/A (one-shot cartoon)	May 10, 1941	DVD: Golden Collection: Vol. 5
A "spot gag" cartoon set on a farm featuring animal-related gags, including newborn chicks scaring a weasel when he tries to steal them, a pair of birds building a house out of twigs, string and straw, and a running gag where seven piglets watch an alarm clock.
327	17	Hollywood Steps Out	MM	Tex Avery	Melvin Millar	Rod Scribner	N/A (one-shot cartoon)	May 24, 1941	DVD: Golden Collection: Vol. 2 Blu-Ray/DVD: Platinum Collection: Vol. 2
A group of "caricatured" Hollywood stars have an expensive dinner at Ciro's nightclub in West Hollywood for entertainment.
328	18	A Coy Decoy	LT	Bob Clampett	Melvin Millar	Norman McCabe	Daffy Duck; Porky Pig	June 7, 1941	DVD: Porky Pig 101
In a closed bookstore at night, many characters and elements featured within the books come to life, mainly Daffy Duck from "The Ugly Duckling".
329	19	Hiawatha's Rabbit Hunt	MM	Friz Freleng	Michael Maltese	Gil Turner	Bugs Bunny	June 7, 1941	DVD: Warner Bros. Home Entertainment Academy Awards Animation Collection; Blu-Ray/DVD: Platinum Collection: Vol. 3
An Elmer Fudd-esque Hiawatha hunts Bugs Bunny. Note: Nominated for the Academy Award for Best Animated Short Film in 1942.
330	20	Porky's Prize Pony	LT	Chuck Jones	Rich Hogan	Ken Harris	Porky Pig	June 21, 1941	DVD: Porky Pig 101
Porky Pig prepares for a horse race at the County Fair.
331	21	The Wacky Worm	MM	Friz Freleng	Dave Monahan	Cal Dalton	The Wacky Worm	June 21, 1941	Blu-Ray: Collector's Choice: Vol. 2
A crow finds a Jerry Colonna-esque singing worm in an apple tree.
332	22	Meet John Doughboy	LT	Bob Clampett	Warren Foster	Vive Risto	Porky Pig	July 5, 1941	DVD: Golden Collection: Vol. 6 DVD: Porky Pig 101
Porky Pig, announced as "Draftee 158 3/4", presents a war-themed "spot gag" newsreel parody titled "America's Defense Effort".
333	23	The Heckling Hare	MM	Tex Avery	Michael Maltese	Robert McKimson	Bugs Bunny; Willoughby	July 5, 1941	DVD: Golden Collection: Vol. 2 (restored); DVD: Golden Collection: Vol. 3 (extra, unrestored); Blu-Ray: Collector's Vault: Vol. 2 (restored)
Willoughby the dog tries to hunt Bugs Bunny, but falls for every trap the rabbit sets for him until they both fall off a cliff at the end.
334	24	Inki and the Lion	MM	Chuck Jones	Rich Hogan	Phil Monroe	Inki; Minah Bird	July 19, 1941	N/A
Inki decides to hunt a lion, but ends up being hunted himself.
335	25	Aviation Vacation	MM	Tex Avery	Dave Monahan	Sid Sutherland	N/A (one-shot cartoon)	August 2, 1941	N/A
A "spot gag" cartoon featuring a small airplane on a world tour.
336	26	We, the Animals – Squeak!	LT	Bob Clampett	Melvin Millar	Isadore Ellis	Porky Pig	August 9, 1941	DVD: Porky Pig 101
Porky Pig hosts a radio program titled "We, the Animals – Squeak!", with Kansas City Kitty telling her story.
337	27	Sport Chumpions	MM	Friz Freleng	Michael Maltese	Gerry Chiniquy	N/A (one-shot cartoon)	August 16, 1941	N/A
A "spot gag" cartoon featuring sport-related gags.
338	28	The Henpecked Duck	LT	Bob Clampett	Warren Foster	John Carey	Daffy Duck; Porky Pig	August 30, 1941	DVD: Porky Pig 101
Daffy Duck tries to save his marriage in a courtroom after losing his wife's egg.
339	29	Snow Time for Comedy	MM	Chuck Jones	Rich Hogan	Robert Cannon	The Two Curious Puppies	August 30, 1941	Blu-Ray: Manpower (extra, restored)
The Two Curious Puppies chase a bone in the winter, but they are soon at odds with beavers and dangerous ice.
340	30	All This and Rabbit Stew	MM	Tex Avery (uncredited)	Dave Monahan	Virgil Ross	Bugs Bunny	September 13, 1941	N/A
Bugs Bunny is hunted by an African American hunter. Note: One of the Censored Eleven.
341	31	Notes to You	LT	Friz Freleng	Michael Maltese	Manuel Perez	Porky Pig	September 20, 1941	DVD: Porky Pig 101
Porky Pig is ready for bed, but a singing cat interrupts his sleep.
342	32	The Brave Little Bat	MM	Chuck Jones	Rich Hogan	Rudy Larriva	Sniffles	September 27, 1941	Blu-Ray/DVD: Mouse Chronicles
Sniffles' car breaks down, so he takes refuge in an old windmill when it starts raining.
343	33	The Bug Parade	MM	Tex Avery (uncredited)	Dave Monahan	Rod Scribner	N/A (one-shot cartoon)	October 11, 1941	N/A
A "spot gag" cartoon featuring gags about insects.
344	34	Robinson Crusoe Jr.	LT	Norman McCabe	Melvin Millar	Vive Risto	Porky Pig	October 25, 1941	DVD: Porky Pig 101
Porky Pig is shipwrecked on an island and lives like Robinson Crusoe and meets a Hottentot which he nicknames Friday.
345	35	Rookie Revue	MM	Friz Freleng	Dave Monahan	Richard Bickenbach	N/A (one-shot cartoon)	October 25, 1941	DVD: Golden Collection: Vol. 6
A war-themed "spot gag" cartoon set at a soldier's campsite, featuring pre-war training gags.
346	36	Saddle Silly	MM	Chuck Jones	N/A	Phil DeLara	N/A (one-shot cartoon)	November 8, 1941	Blu-Ray: Collector's Choice: Vol. 3
A Pony Express rider sends mail in the Old West.
347	37	Porky's Midnight Matinee	LT	Chuck Jones	Rich Hogan (uncredited)	Robert Cannon	Porky Pig	November 22, 1941	DVD: Porky Pig 101
Porky Pig chases an African pygmy ant in a film studio.
348	38	The Cagey Canary	MM	Tex Avery (uncredited)	Michael Maltese	Robert McKimson	N/A (one-shot cartoon)	November 22, 1941	Blu-Ray: Collector's Choice: Vol. 4
A cat tries to catch a canary, but an old woman hates the noise.
349	39	Rhapsody in Rivets	MM	Friz Freleng	Michael Maltese	Gil Turner	N/A (one-shot cartoon)	December 6, 1941	DVD: Warner Bros. Home Entertainment Academy Awards Animation Collection; Blu-Ray/DVD: Platinum Collection: Vol. 3
At a busy urban construction site in a world of anthropomorphic animals, the foreman uses building plans as his score and conducts the workmen in Franz Liszt's "Hungarian Rhapsody No. 2", a symphony of riveting, hammering, sawing, and more. Elevators, picks, shovels, and a steam shovel are instruments in music making and construction. Note: Nominated for the Academy Award for Best Animated Short Film in 1942.
350	40	Wabbit Twouble	MM	Tex Avery (uncredited) (Note: Bob Clampett was credited in his place.)	Dave Monahan	Sid Sutherland	Bugs Bunny; Elmer Fudd	December 20, 1941	DVD: Golden Collection: Vol. 1 Blu-Ray/DVD: Platinum Collection: Vol. 2
Elmer Fudd goes on a camping trip at Jellostone National Park. Bugs Bunny plays a series of pranks at Elmer's campsite.
351	41	Porky's Pooch	LT	Bob Clampett	Warren Foster	Isadore Ellis	Porky Pig; Charlie Dog (prototype)	December 27, 1941	DVD: Golden Collection: Vol. 5 DVD: Porky Pig 101
Rover tells a black Scottie dog named Sandy his story about how he got a master. Note: According to Chuck Jones one of the dogs in this cartoon, originally named Rover, is actually an early prototype of Charlie Dog.

== 1942 ==
This year marks the beginning of production of color Looney Tunes.

No. overall	No. in year	Title	Series	Directed by	Story by	Animated by	Recurring characters	Original release date	Official DVD/Blu-Ray Availability
352	1	Hop, Skip and a Chump	MM	Friz Freleng	Michael Maltese	Cal Dalton	N/A (one-shot cartoon)	January 3, 1942	Blu-Ray: Collector's Choice: Vol. 3
Two blackbirds want to catch a grasshopper named Hopalong Casserole.
353	2	Porky's Pastry Pirates	LT	Friz Freleng	Dave Monahan	Gerry Chiniquy	Porky Pig	January 17, 1942	DVD: Porky Pig 101
Porky Pig owns a "Sanitary Bakery", which a bee and a fly invade.
354	3	The Bird Came C. O. D.	MM	Chuck Jones	N/A	Ken Harris	Conrad Cat	January 17, 1942	Blu-Ray: Collector's Vault: Vol. 2
Conrad Cat tries to deliver a potted palm tree to a theater.
355	4	Aloha Hooey	MM	Tex Avery (uncredited)	Michael Maltese	Virgil Ross	N/A (one-shot cartoon)	January 30, 1942	N/A
Cecil Crow from Iowa wants to see a hula dancer.
356	5	Who's Who in the Zoo	LT	Norman McCabe	Melvin Millar	John Carey	Porky Pig	February 14, 1942	DVD: Porky Pig 101
A "spot gag" cartoon set in the "Azusa Zoo" featuring animal-related gags, including a "missing lynx", "March hares" who march to a drumbeat, an elephant dressed as a Native American, three gags involving zookeeper Porky Pig, and a running gag where a lion waits for the arrival of an ice cream truck.
357	6	Porky's Cafe	LT	Chuck Jones	N/A	Rudy Larriva	Porky Pig; Conrad Cat	February 21, 1942	DVD: Porky Pig 101
Porky Pig serves as the waiter of his café, using mechanical gadgets to fix up a meal for his customer. Meanwhile, chef Conrad Cat has to deal with an African pygmy ant invading the restaurant.
358	7	Conrad the Sailor	MM	Chuck Jones	Dave Monahan	Ben Washam	Daffy Duck; Conrad Cat	February 28, 1942	DVD: Golden Collection: Vol. 4 Blu-Ray: Collector's Vault: Vol. 3
Conrad Cat is a sailor of a battleship, but keeps getting pranked by Daffy Duck while performing his duties.
359	8	Crazy Cruise	MM	Bob Clampett (uncredited)	Michael Maltese	Rod Scribner	Bugs Bunny (cameo)	March 14, 1942	DVD: Golden Collection: Vol. 5
A fictionalized global tour of the world, ending with Bugs Bunny and two other gray rabbits shooting a Japanese bird with volleys.
360	9	The Wabbit Who Came to Supper	MM	Friz Freleng	Michael Maltese	Richard Bickenbach	Bugs Bunny; Elmer Fudd	March 28, 1942	DVD: Golden Collection: Vol. 3
Elmer Fudd receives a telegram from his uncle Louie saying that he must refrain from harming animals, including rabbits, to inherit the promised sum of $3 million, causing Bugs Bunny to play a series of antics in Elmer's house.
361	10	Horton Hatches the Egg	MM	Bob Clampett	Michael Maltese; Adapted from the book by: Dr. Seuss	Robert McKimson	N/A (one-shot cartoon)	April 11, 1942	DVD: Golden Collection: Vol. 6 Blu-Ray: Collector's Vault: Vol. 1
An adaptation of the book of the same name by Dr. Seuss.
362	11	Saps in Chaps	LT	Friz Freleng	Dave Monahan	Manuel Perez	N/A (one-shot cartoon)	April 11, 1942	N/A
A "spot gag" cartoon set in the Old West during the 1800s featuring a running gag involving a pony express man failing to get onto the saddle of a horse.
363	12	Dog Tired	MM	Chuck Jones	Rich Hogan (uncredited)	Phil Monroe	The Two Curious Puppies	April 25, 1942	N/A
The Two Curious Puppies, whilst arguing for a bone, chase each other into the city zoo, where they encounter various animals, including a loud hyena who often laughs at them.
364	13	Daffy's Southern Exposure	LT	Norman McCabe	Don R. Christensen	Vive Risto	Daffy Duck	May 2, 1942	Blu-Ray: Collector's Choice: Vol. 2
Daffy Duck decides not to fly south for the winter, as he wants to "check up on this winter business". As winter arrives, Daffy begins to starve. He finds a log cabin owned by a starving fox and a weasel who want to eat him for dinner.
365	14	The Wacky Wabbit	MM	Bob Clampett	Warren Foster	Sid Sutherland	Bugs Bunny; Elmer Fudd	May 2, 1942	DVD: Golden Collection: Vol. 5
Elmer Fudd prospects for gold for the Allied victory effort in the west during World War II, but Bugs Bunny keeps playing pranks on him.
366	15	The Draft Horse	MM	Chuck Jones	Tedd Pierce	Robert Cannon	N/A (one-shot cartoon)	May 9, 1942	DVD: Golden Collection: Vol. 6
A farm horse wants to enlist to help the war effort.
367	16	Nutty News	LT	Bob Clampett	Warren Foster	Virgil Ross	Willoughby (cameo)	May 23, 1942	N/A
A "spot gag" newsreel parody narrated by Arthur Q. Bryan (using his Elmer Fudd voice).
368	17	Lights Fantastic	MM	Friz Freleng	Dave Monahan	Gil Turner	N/A (one-shot cartoon)	May 23, 1942	DVD: Golden Collection: Vol. 6
New York City and its various bright lights all come to life.
369	18	Hobby Horse-Laffs	LT	Norman McCabe	Melvin Millar	Cal Dalton	N/A (one-shot cartoon)	June 6, 1942	Blu-Ray: Gentleman Jim (extra, restored)
A parody of the radio program Hobby Lobby featuring blackout gags showcasing people's various hobbies and/or inventions.
370	19	Hold the Lion, Please	MM	Chuck Jones	Tedd Pierce	Ken Harris	Bugs Bunny; Leo the Lion	June 13, 1942	Blu-Ray: Bugs Bunny 80th Anniversary Collection
Leo the Lion tries to prove he is still "King of the Jungle", but finds hunting Bugs Bunny not so easy.
371	20	Gopher Goofy	LT	Norman McCabe	Don R. Christensen	Isadore Ellis	N/A (one-shot cartoon)	June 27, 1942	N/A
Two gophers, one being a slow-paced gopher named Virgil, invade a homeowner's lawn and garden.
372	21	Double Chaser	MM	Friz Freleng	Michael Maltese	Gerry Chiniquy	N/A (one-shot cartoon)	June 27, 1942	Blu-Ray: Collector's Choice: Vol. 4
A mouse being chased by a cat enlists the help of a sleeping bulldog.
373	22	Wacky Blackout	LT	Bob Clampett	Warren Foster	Sid Sutherland	N/A (one-shot cartoon)	July 11, 1942	DVD: Golden Collection: Vol. 6
A "spot gag" cartoon set on a farm during World War II, featuring gags related to the war, including those related to a blackout.
374	23	Bugs Bunny Gets the Boid	MM	Bob Clampett	Warren Foster	Rod Scribner	Bugs Bunny; Beaky Buzzard	July 11, 1942	DVD: Golden Collection: Vol. 1 Blu-Ray/DVD: Platinum Collection: Vol. 2 Blu-Ray: Bugs Bunny 80th Anniversary Collection
Beaky Buzzard is tasked by his mother to catch a rabbit and happens on Bugs Bunny, but the rabbit evades the buzzard.
375	24	Foney Fables	MM	Friz Freleng	Michael Maltese	Richard Bickenbach	N/A (one-shot cartoon)	August 1, 1942	DVD: Golden Collection: Vol. 5
A "spot gag" cartoon featuring gags related to fairy tales, including a running gag related to "The Boy Who Cried Wolf".
376	25	The Ducktators	LT	Norman McCabe	Melvin Millar	John Carey	N/A (one-shot cartoon)	August 1, 1942	DVD: Golden Collection: Vol. 6
A propaganda short set on a poultry farm satirizing events of World War II, with Adolf Hitler, Benito Mussolini, and Hideki Tojo depicted as barnyard fowl.
377	26	The Squawkin' Hawk	MM	Chuck Jones	Michael Maltese	Phil Monroe	Henery Hawk	August 8, 1942	Blu-Ray: Collector's Vault: Vol. 1
Henery Hawk (in his debut cartoon) wants a chicken for dinner. His mother insists he eat a worm, but he refuses.
378	27	Eatin' on the Cuff	LT	Bob Clampett	Warren Foster	Virgil Ross	N/A (one-shot cartoon)	August 22, 1942	DVD: Golden Collection: Vol. 5
A pianist (portrayed in live-action by Leo White with his voice dubbed by Mel Blanc) sings and narrates a story about a wiseguy moth preparing for his wedding day with a bee.
379	28	Fresh Hare	MM	Friz Freleng	Michael Maltese	Manuel Perez	Bugs Bunny; Elmer Fudd	August 22, 1942	DVD: Captains of the Clouds (extra, unrestored & uncensored)
Elmer Fudd is a Mountie earnestly attempting to arrest Bugs Bunny, who plays a series of pranks on him in the snow.
380	29	The Impatient Patient	LT	Norman McCabe	Don R. Christensen	Vive Risto	Daffy Duck	September 5, 1942	Blu-Ray: Collector's Choice: Vol. 4
Telegram deliverer Daffy Duck suffers from a severe case of hiccups and goes to see Dr. Jerkyl, who, trying to scare the duck to cure his hiccups, creates and drinks a potion that turns the doctor into a grotesque ogre named "Chloe", the recipient for Daffy's telegram.
381	30	Fox Pop	MM	Chuck Jones	Tedd Pierce	Phil DeLara	N/A (one-shot cartoon)	September 5, 1942	Blu-Ray: Collector's Choice: Vol. 4
A red fox overhears an announcement on a radio for the Sterling Silver Fox Farm, so he paints himself silver and gets caged by a trapper.
382	31	The Dover Boys at Pimento University	MM	Chuck Jones	Tedd Pierce	Robert Cannon	N/A (one-shot cartoon)	September 10, 1942	DVD: Golden Collection: Vol. 2 Blu-Ray/DVD: Platinum Collection: Vol. 1
A parody of the Rover Boys where Tom, Dick, and Larry try to rescue Dora Standpipe from Dan Backslide. The running gag involves an odd gray-bearded man in a nineteenth-century bathing suit and sailor cap interrupting the story by shuffling across the screen to the tune of Ed Haley's "While Strolling Through the Park One Day".
383	32	The Hep Cat	LT	Bob Clampett	Warren Foster	Robert McKimson	Willoughby	October 3, 1942	DVD: Golden Collection: Vol. 2 Blu-Ray/DVD: Platinum Collection: Vol. 3
A cat stumbles into Willoughby the dog (called Rosebud in this cartoon), who attempts to capture him. Note: First color short produced under the Looney Tunes series.
384	33	The Sheepish Wolf	MM	Friz Freleng	Michael Maltese	Gil Turner	N/A (one-shot cartoon)	October 17, 1942	Blu-Ray: Collector's Choice: Vol. 3
A sheepdog watching a flock of sheep attempts to capture a wolf wearing a sheep costume.
385	34	The Daffy Duckaroo	LT	Norman McCabe	Melvin Millar	Cal Dalton	Daffy Duck	October 24, 1942	Blu-Ray: Collector's Vault: Vol. 2
Daffy Duckaroo moves from Hollywood to the American West and finds Daisy June, a New York duck in Native American attire. Daffy later escapes from Little Beaver, a hulking Indian man who is Daisy's boyfriend.
386	35	The Hare-Brained Hypnotist	MM	Friz Freleng	Michael Maltese	Phil Monroe	Bugs Bunny; Elmer Fudd	October 31, 1942	DVD: Golden Collection: Vol. 2
Elmer Fudd tries to use hypnotism to catch Bugs Bunny, but it is vice versa instead.
387	36	A Tale of Two Kitties	MM	Bob Clampett	Warren Foster	Rod Scribner	Tweety; Babbit and Catstello	November 21, 1942	DVD: Golden Collection: Vol. 5 Blu-Ray/DVD: Platinum Collection: Vol. 1
Babbit and Catstello are cats who attempt to catch a bird named Tweety Pie (in his debut cartoon).
388	37	My Favorite Duck	LT	Chuck Jones	Michael Maltese	Rudy Larriva	Daffy Duck; Porky Pig	December 5, 1942	DVD: Golden Collection: Vol. 4 (extra, unrestored); DVD: Golden Collection: Vol. 6 (restored); Blu-Ray: Collector's Vault: Vol. 3 (restored)
Porky Pig is out camping, but keeps getting heckled by Daffy Duck, who seems protected by environmental laws.
389	38	Ding Dog Daddy	MM	Friz Freleng	Tedd Pierce	Gerry Chiniquy	N/A (one-shot cartoon)	December 5, 1942	Blu-Ray: Collector's Choice: Vol. 2
A male dog who is hungry for love mistakes an iron dog statue for an actual female dog, especially after being struck by lightning while kissing the statue.
390	39	Case of the Missing Hare	MM	Chuck Jones	Tedd Pierce	Ken Harris	Bugs Bunny	December 12, 1942	DVD: Golden Collection: Vol. 3 Blu-Ray: Collector's Vault: Vol. 3
Bugs Bunny disrupts Ala Bahma's magic show.

== 1943 ==
The Blue Ribbon Merrie Melodies re-release program starts this year.

No. overall	No. in year	Title	Series	Directed by	Story by	Animated by	Recurring characters	Original release date	Official DVD/Blu-Ray Availability
391	1	Coal Black and de Sebben Dwarfs	MM	Bob Clampett	Warren Foster	Rod Scribner	N/A (one-shot cartoon)	January 16, 1943	N/A
An all-black parody of the Brothers Grimm fairy tale "Snow White". Note: One of the Censored Eleven.
392	2	Confusions of a Nutzy Spy	LT	Norman McCabe	Don R. Christensen	Isadore Ellis	Porky Pig	January 23, 1943	DVD: Golden Collection: Vol. 6 (extra, unrestored); DVD: Porky Pig 101 (unrestored)
Porky Pig and his bloodhound Eggbert go on a quest to find the Nazi spy called the "Missing Lynx".
393	3	Pigs in a Polka	MM	Friz Freleng	Michael Maltese	Richard Bickenbach	N/A (one-shot cartoon)	February 2, 1943	DVD: Golden Collection: Vol. 3 DVD: Warner Bros. Home Entertainment Academy Awards Animation Collection; Blu-Ray/DVD: Platinum Collection: Vol. 3
An adaptation of the fairy tale "The Three Little Pigs" set to several of Johannes Brahms' "Hungarian Dances". Note: Nominated for the Academy Award for Best Animated Short Film in 1943.
394	4	Tortoise Wins by a Hare	MM	Bob Clampett	Warren Foster	Robert McKimson	Bugs Bunny; Cecil Turtle	February 20, 1943	DVD: Golden Collection: Vol. 1 Blu-Ray/DVD: Platinum Collection: Vol. 2
Watching how he lost in Tortoise Beats Hare, Bugs Bunny challenges Cecil Turtle to a rematch.
395	5	To Duck.... or Not to Duck	LT	Chuck Jones	Tedd Pierce	Robert Cannon	Daffy Duck; Elmer Fudd	March 6, 1943	DVD: Golden Collection: Vol. 6
After Elmer Fudd tries to hunt Daffy Duck, the two participate in a boxing match against each other.
396	6	The Fifth-Column Mouse	MM	Friz Freleng	Michael Maltese	Ken Champin	N/A (one-shot cartoon)	March 6, 1943	DVD: Golden Collection: Vol. 6
A gray mouse helps a cat subjugate a community of brown mice, who rebel and go to war against the cat.
397	7	Flop Goes the Weasel	MM	Chuck Jones	Michael Maltese	Rudy Larriva	N/A (one-shot cartoon)	March 20, 1943	N/A
While a hen is out trying to catch a worm for her soon-to-be baby, a weasel steals the egg, in which its chick comes out when he cracks it and outsmarts him.
398	8	Hop and Go	LT	Norman McCabe	Melvin Millar	Cal Dalton	N/A (one-shot cartoon)	March 27, 1943	DVD: Golden Collection: Vol. 6 (extra, unrestored); Blu-Ray: Collector's Vault: Vol. 2 (restored)
A kangaroo named Claude Hopper gets help from two Scottish rabbits to jump better.
399	9	Super-Rabbit	MM	Chuck Jones	Tedd Pierce	Ken Harris	Bugs Bunny	April 3, 1943	DVD: Golden Collection: Vol. 3 Blu-Ray: Bugs Bunny 80th Anniversary Collection
A parody of Superman starring Bugs Bunny.
400	10	The Unbearable Bear	MM	Chuck Jones	Michael Maltese	Robert Cannon	Sniffles	April 17, 1943	Blu-Ray/DVD: Mouse Chronicles
Sniffles' communicative manners foil both a burglar and a tipsy Officer Bear, who is trying to sneak past his rolling-pin-toting, sleepwalking wife.
401	11	The Wise Quacking Duck	LT	Bob Clampett	Warren Foster	Phil Monroe	Daffy Duck	May 1, 1943	DVD: Golden Collection: Vol. 5 Blu-Ray/DVD: Platinum Collection: Vol. 2
Daffy Duck plays a series of pranks on Mr. Meek, who wants to cook him for dinner.
402	12	Greetings Bait!	MM	Friz Freleng	Tedd Pierce	Manuel Perez	The Wacky Worm	May 15, 1943	Blu-Ray: Collector's Choice: Vol. 2
A Jerry Colonna-esque singing worm is used as bait. Note: Nominated for the Academy Award for Best Animated Short Film in 1944.
403	13	Tokio Jokio	LT	Norman McCabe	Don R. Christensen	Isadore Ellis	N/A (one-shot cartoon)	May 15, 1943	N/A
A newsreel parody from Japanese cinema that was captured by American troops during World War II.
404	14	Jack-Wabbit and the Beanstalk	MM	Friz Freleng	Michael Maltese	Jack Bradbury	Bugs Bunny	June 12, 1943	Blu-Ray: Bugs Bunny 80th Anniversary Collection
Bugs Bunny evades a giant in a parody of "Jack and the Beanstalk".
405	15	The Aristo Cat	MM	Chuck Jones	Tedd Pierce	Rudy Larriva	Hubie and Bertie	June 19, 1943	DVD: Golden Collection: Vol. 4 Blu-Ray/DVD: Mouse Chronicles
A pampered and spoiled black cat who has never seen a mouse before is tricked by Hubie and Bertie (in their debut) into mistaking Rover the bulldog for a mouse.
406	16	Yankee Doodle Daffy	LT	Friz Freleng	Tedd Pierce	Richard Bickenbach	Daffy Duck; Porky Pig	July 3, 1943	DVD: Golden Collection: Vol. 1
Porky Pig tries to leave his office of Smeller Productions in a hurry to go golfing, but Daffy Duck wants to secure an audition for his client Sleepy Lagoon.
407	17	Wackiki Wabbit	MM	Chuck Jones	Tedd Pierce	Ken Harris	Bugs Bunny	July 3, 1943	DVD: Golden Collection: Vol. 3
Bugs Bunny plays a series of pranks on two castaways on a tropical island who want to eat him.
408	18	Porky Pig's Feat	LT	Frank Tashlin	Melvin Millar	Phil Monroe	Daffy Duck; Porky Pig; Bugs Bunny (cameo)	July 17, 1943	DVD: Golden Collection: Vol. 3 Blu-Ray/DVD: Platinum Collection: Vol. 3 DVD: Porky Pig 101
After Daffy Duck loses all of his and Porky Pig's money playing craps, they attempt to escape the Broken Arms Hotel without paying their bill to the hotel manager.
409	19	Tin Pan Alley Cats	MM	Bob Clampett	Warren Foster	Rod Scribner	N/A (one-shot cartoon)	July 17, 1943	N/A
A Fats Waller-esque cat goes to the Kit Kat Club. Note: One of the Censored Eleven.
410	20	Scrap Happy Daffy	LT	Frank Tashlin	Don R. Christensen	Arthur Davis	Daffy Duck	August 21, 1943	DVD: Golden Collection: Vol. 5 Blu-Ray/DVD: Platinum Collection: Vol. 3
Daffy Duck is the guard of a scrap pile during World War II. When a Nazi goat tries to eat all of the scrap on Hitler's Orders, it is up to Daffy to stop it.
411	21	Hiss and Make Up	MM	Friz Freleng	Michael Maltese	Gerry Chiniquy	Granny (prototype)	September 11, 1943	Blu-Ray: Collector's Choice: Vol. 2
A cat named Wellington and a dog named Roscoe make mischief by fighting each other aggressively.
412	22	A Corny Concerto	MM	Bob Clampett	Frank Tashlin	Robert McKimson	Elmer Fudd; Porky Pig; Bugs Bunny; Daffy Duck	September 18, 1943	DVD: Golden Collection: Vol. 2 (restored); DVD: Golden Collection: Vol. 4 (extra, unrestored); Blu-Ray/DVD: Platinum Collection: Vol. 3 (restored)
In a parody of Walt Disney's 1940 film Fantasia, Elmer Fudd, resembling Deems Taylor, presents two segments with music by Johann Strauss: "Tales from the Vienna Woods" featuring Porky Pig and Bugs Bunny, and "The Blue Danube" featuring Daffy Duck.
413	23	Fin 'n' Catty	MM	Chuck Jones	Michael Maltese	Ben Washam	N/A (one-shot cartoon)	October 23, 1943	Blu-Ray: Collector's Choice: Vol. 2
A cat who is scared of water attempts to catch a goldfish while staying dry.
414	24	Falling Hare	MM	Bob Clampett	Warren Foster	Rod Scribner	Bugs Bunny	October 30, 1943	DVD: Golden Collection: Vol. 3 Blu-Ray/DVD: Platinum Collection: Vol. 3
Bugs Bunny is heckled by a gremlin who is trying to sabotage an American military aircraft.
415	25	Inki and the Minah Bird	MM	Chuck Jones	Tedd Pierce	Robert Cannon	Inki; Minah Bird	November 13, 1943	N/A
Inki runs into a denture-wearing lion while hunting with a spear. After the lion chases him, the minah bird joins forces with him against the lion, but proceeds to mess everything up for all.
416	26	Daffy – The Commando	LT	Friz Freleng	Michael Maltese	Ken Champin	Daffy Duck	November 20, 1943	DVD: Golden Collection: Vol. 6 Blu-Ray: Collector's Vault: Vol. 3
Daffy Duck is a commando behind Nazi lines on a mission to Berlin against Adolf Hitler.
417	27	An Itch in Time	MM	Bob Clampett	Warren Foster	Robert McKimson	A. Flea; Elmer Fudd; Willoughby	December 4, 1943	DVD: Golden Collection: Vol. 3 Blu-Ray/DVD: Platinum Collection: Vol. 2
A flea takes up residence in Elmer Fudd's pet dog Willoughby's fur.
418	28	Puss n' Booty	LT	Frank Tashlin	Warren Foster	Cal Dalton	N/A (one-shot cartoon)	December 11, 1943	DVD: Golden Collection: Vol. 4 Blu-Ray: Collector's Vault: Vol. 3
After a pet owner notices her canary Dicky has mysteriously disappeared from her house, she orders another canary whom she names Petey. Her cat Rudolph tries to eat Petey, but the bird repeatedly prevents the cat from doing so by beating him up. Note: Final black-and-white Looney Tunes cartoon.
419	29	Little Red Riding Rabbit	MM	Friz Freleng	Michael Maltese	Manuel Perez	Bugs Bunny	December 30, 1943 (earliest known date)	DVD: Golden Collection: Vol. 2 Blu-Ray/DVD: Platinum Collection: Vol. 3
Little Red Riding Hood carries Bugs Bunny in a basket to her grandmother's house. Note: First cartoon in which Mel Blanc gets on-screen credit.

== 1944 ==
This is the first year with no black-and-white cartoons in both series as well as the first year with a perfect record of renewed copyrights since 1934. Leon Schlesinger sells his cartoon studio to Warner Bros. Pictures this year; the producer's credit goes to Warner Bros. Cartoons starting with Goldilocks and the Jivin' Bears.

No. overall	No. in year	Title	Series	Directed by	Story by	Animated by	Recurring characters	Original release date	Official DVD/Blu-Ray Availability
420	1	What's Cookin' Doc?	MM	Bob Clampett	Michael Sasanoff	Robert McKimson	Bugs Bunny	January 8, 1944	DVD: Golden Collection: Vol. 4 (extra, unrestored); DVD: Warner Bros. Home Entertainment Academy Awards Animation Collection (extra, unrestored); Blu-Ray: Bugs Bunny 80th Anniversary Collection (restored)
Bugs Bunny competes for the Academy Award for Best Actor.
421	2	Meatless Flyday	MM	Friz Freleng	Michael Maltese	Jack Bradbury	N/A (one-shot cartoon)	January 29, 1944	Blu-Ray: Collector's Choice: Vol. 4
A spider tries to catch a fly on "Meatless Tuesday".
422	3	Tom Turk and Daffy	LT	Chuck Jones	Michael Maltese & Tedd Pierce (Note: Both credited as "The Staff".)	Ken Harris	Daffy Duck; Porky Pig; Tom Turk	February 12, 1944	DVD: Super Stars' Porky & Friends; Blu-Ray: Collector's Vault: Vol. 1
Daffy Duck befriends a turkey named Tom Turk; both must evade being pursued by Porky Pig.
423	4	Bugs Bunny and the Three Bears	MM	Chuck Jones	Tedd Pierce	Robert Cannon	Bugs Bunny; The Three Bears	February 26, 1944	DVD: Golden Collection: Vol. 1 Blu-Ray: Bugs Bunny 80th Anniversary Collection
Bugs Bunny goes into a home owned by Three Bears and follows a story similar to the "Goldilocks and the Three Bears" fairy tale.
424	5	I Got Plenty of Mutton	LT	Frank Tashlin	Melvin Millar	Isadore Ellis	N/A (one-shot cartoon)	March 11, 1944	DVD: Golden Collection: Vol. 4 Blu-Ray: Collector's Vault: Vol. 3
A wolf, deprived of meat by war rationing and starving from the mice in his cave eating his meager scraps, fails to know that a flock of sheep is guarded by a ram named "Killer Diller". The wolf attempts to catch a sheep, but the ram repeatedly prevents him from doing so.
425	6	The Weakly Reporter	MM	Chuck Jones	Michael Maltese	Ben Washam	N/A (one-shot cartoon)	March 25, 1944	DVD: Golden Collection: Vol. 6
A spoof of sacrifices made by people on the homefront during World War II.
426	7	Tick Tock Tuckered	LT	Bob Clampett	Warren Foster	Thomas McKimson	Daffy Duck; Porky Pig	April 8, 1944	DVD: Super Stars' Daffy Duck
A color remake of Porky's Badtime Story, but with Gabby Goat swapped for Daffy Duck.
427	8	Bugs Bunny Nips the Nips	MM	Friz Freleng	Tedd Pierce	Gerry Chiniquy	Bugs Bunny	April 22, 1944	N/A
Bugs Bunny fights against the Imperial Japanese Army in the Pacific War.
428	9	The Swooner Crooner	LT	Frank Tashlin	Warren Foster	George Cannata	Porky Pig	May 6, 1944	DVD: Golden Collection: Vol. 3 DVD: Warner Bros. Home Entertainment Academy Awards Animation Collection; Blu-Ray/DVD: Platinum Collection: Vol. 3
Porky Pig's wartime egg farm production is disrupted by his hens going crazy over a crooning Frank Sinatra rooster, so a crooning Bing Crosby rooster steps in to help get production going again. Note: Nominated for the Academy Award for Best Animated Short Film in 1945.
429	10	Russian Rhapsody	MM	Bob Clampett	Lou Lilly	Rod Scribner	N/A (one-shot cartoon)	May 20, 1944	DVD: Golden Collection: Vol. 6 Blu-Ray/DVD: Platinum Collection: Vol. 2
Adolf Hitler in his bomber takes on the "Gremlins from the Kremlin".
430	11	Duck Soup to Nuts	LT	Friz Freleng	Tedd Pierce	Richard Bickenbach	Daffy Duck; Porky Pig	May 27, 1944	DVD: Golden Collection: Vol. 2 Blu-Ray: Collector's Vault: Vol. 3
Daffy Duck outsmarts Porky Pig after his gunshots disturb Daffy's friends.
431	12	Angel Puss	LT	Chuck Jones	Lou Lilly	Ken Harris	N/A (one-shot cartoon)	June 3, 1944	N/A
A young African-American boy named Sambo is paid to drown a cat, but doesn't go through with it. The cat disguises him as a ghost to scare him as revenge for Sambo nearly doing so. Note: One of the Censored Eleven.
432	13	Slightly Daffy	MM	Friz Freleng	Michael Maltese	Virgil Ross	Daffy Duck; Porky Pig	June 17, 1944	Blu-Ray: Collector's Vault: Vol. 3
A color remake of Scalp Trouble.
433	14	Hare Ribbin'	MM	Bob Clampett	Lou Lilly	Robert McKimson	Bugs Bunny	June 24, 1944	DVD: Golden Collection: Vol. 5 Blu-Ray: Bugs Bunny 80th Anniversary Collection
Bugs Bunny foils a Russian dog's plans to hunt him.
434	15	Brother Brat	LT	Frank Tashlin	Melvin Millar	Arthur Davis	Porky Pig	July 15, 1944	Blu-Ray: Collector's Choice: Vol. 2
When a human mother goes to work in a factory during World War II, Porky Pig is tasked to watch her bratty infant son Percy.
435	16	Hare Force	MM	Friz Freleng	Tedd Pierce	Manuel Perez	Bugs Bunny; Granny (prototype)	July 22, 1944	DVD: Golden Collection: Vol. 3
Bugs Bunny swings his way into an old lady's house. The owner's dog Sylvester takes an instant dislike to Bugs, and the two trick each other into going outside the house and getting locked out.
436	17	From Hand to Mouse	LT	Chuck Jones	Michael Maltese	Ray Patin	N/A (one-shot cartoon)	August 5, 1944	Blu-Ray: Collector's Choice: Vol. 2
A dim-witted lion has to deal with a fast-talking mouse.
437	18	Birdy and the Beast	MM	Bob Clampett	Warren Foster	Thomas McKimson	Tweety	August 19, 1944	Blu-Ray/DVD: Platinum Collection: Vol. 2
Tweety tries to outsmart a cat wanting to catch him.
438	19	Buckaroo Bugs	LT	Bob Clampett	Lou Lilly	Manny Gould	Bugs Bunny	August 26, 1944	DVD: Golden Collection: Vol. 5 Blu-Ray/DVD: Platinum Collection: Vol. 2
Bugs Bunny assumes the role of the Masked Marauder, a notorious carrot thief in San Fernando Alley who outsmarts Red Hot Ryder. Note: Final cartoon produced by Leon Schlesinger.
439	20	Goldilocks and the Jivin' Bears	MM	Friz Freleng	Tedd Pierce	Ken Champin	N/A (one-shot cartoon)	September 2, 1944	N/A
A crossover between "Goldilocks and the Three Bears" and "Little Red Riding Hood", with all the characters in blackface style. Note: One of the Censored Eleven and the latest of them.
440	21	Plane Daffy	LT	Frank Tashlin	Warren Foster	Cal Dalton	Daffy Duck	September 16, 1944	DVD: Golden Collection: Vol. 4 DVD: The Essential Daffy Duck; Blu-Ray/DVD: Platinum Collection: Vol. 3
Daffy Duck is a messenger who battles a female Nazi spy and is eventually confronted with Adolf Hitler, Joseph Goebbels and Hermann Göring.
441	22	Lost and Foundling	MM	Chuck Jones	Tedd Pierce	Ben Washam	Sniffles	September 30, 1944	Blu-Ray/DVD: Mouse Chronicles
Sniffles hatches an egg that belonged to a mother hawk. He names the chick Orville and raises him as his own.
442	23	Booby Hatched	LT	Frank Tashlin	Warren Foster	Isadore Ellis	N/A (one-shot cartoon)	October 14, 1944	DVD: Golden Collection: Vol. 4 Blu-Ray: Collector's Vault: Vol. 3
A mother duck hatches her eggs in a snowstorm. One duckling named Robespierre, who hatched prematurely, tries to get warm in a shelter.
443	24	The Old Grey Hare	MM	Bob Clampett	Michael Sasanoff	Robert McKimson	Bugs Bunny; Elmer Fudd	October 28, 1944	DVD: Golden Collection: Vol. 4 (extra, unrestored); DVD: Golden Collection: Vol. 5 (restored); DVD: The Essential Bugs Bunny (restored); Blu-Ray/DVD: Platinum Collection: Vol. 1 (restored); Blu-Ray: Bugs Bunny 80th Anniversary Collection (restored)
Elmer Fudd tries to kill Bugs Bunny in the year 2000 while both are old and wrinkled.
444	25	The Stupid Cupid	LT	Frank Tashlin	Warren Foster	George Cannata	Daffy Duck; Elmer Fudd	November 25, 1944	DVD: Golden Collection: Vol. 4 Blu-Ray/DVD: Platinum Collection: Vol. 3
Elmer Fudd plays Cupid, a mischievous god who shoots arrows at male animals to make them fall in love with the nearest female animals regardless of their species. When he tries to shoot Daffy Duck, the duck evades Elmer with various tricks.
445	26	Stage Door Cartoon	MM	Friz Freleng	Michael Maltese	Jack Bradbury	Bugs Bunny; Elmer Fudd	December 30, 1944	DVD: Golden Collection: Vol. 2 Blu-Ray: Collector's Vault: Vol. 3
Elmer Fudd chases Bugs Bunny into a theater, where the rabbit tricks Elmer into doing various acts.

== 1945 ==
This is the first year with no involvement whatsoever from Leon Schlesinger.

No. overall	No. in year	Title	Series	Directed by	Story by	Animated by	Recurring characters	Original release date	Official DVD/Blu-Ray Availability
446	1	Odor-able Kitty	LT	Chuck Jones	Tedd Pierce	Robert Cannon	Pepé Le Pew	January 6, 1945	DVD: Golden Collection: Vol. 3 DVD: Super Stars' Pepé Le Pew; Blu-Ray: Collector's Vault: Vol. 1
An orange male cat disguises himself as a skunk after suffering abuse from animals and humans alike, and becomes the object of unrequited love for Pepé Le Pew (in his debut cartoon).
447	2	Herr Meets Hare	MM	Friz Freleng	Michael Maltese	Gerry Chiniquy	Bugs Bunny	January 13, 1945	DVD: Golden Collection: Vol. 6 Blu-Ray: Collector's Vault: Vol. 3
Bugs Bunny faces off against Hermann Göring in Germany.
448	3	Draftee Daffy	LT	Bob Clampett	Lou Lilly	Rod Scribner	Daffy Duck	January 27, 1945	DVD: Golden Collection: Vol. 3 Blu-Ray/DVD: Platinum Collection: Vol. 3
Daffy Duck desperately tries to avoid an agent of the draft board.
449	4	The Unruly Hare	MM	Frank Tashlin	Melvin Millar	Cal Dalton	Bugs Bunny; Elmer Fudd	February 10, 1945	Blu-Ray: Collector's Choice: Vol. 1
Bugs Bunny plays a series of pranks on Elmer Fudd while working at a railroad site.
450	5	Trap Happy Porky	LT	Chuck Jones	Tedd Pierce	Ben Washam	Porky Pig; Hubie and Bertie	February 24, 1945	Blu-Ray/DVD: Mouse Chronicles
Hubie and Bertie, and several cats and dogs invade Uncle Tom's Cabin while Porky Pig is sleeping.
451	6	Life with Feathers	MM	Friz Freleng	Tedd Pierce	Virgil Ross	Sylvester	March 24, 1945	Blu-Ray/DVD: Platinum Collection: Vol. 3
A lovebird, recently separated from his wife, wants to end his life. He tries to get Sylvester the Cat (in his debut) to eat him, who refuses as he worries the bird is poisonous. Note: Nominated for the Academy Award for Best Animated Short Film in 1946.
452	7	Behind the Meat-Ball	LT	Frank Tashlin	Melvin Millar	Isadore Ellis	N/A (one-shot cartoon)	April 7, 1945	Blu-Ray: Collector's Choice: Vol. 2
A dog named Fido hates having food with no meat. When a steak is dropped by a meat delivery truck, Fido and two other dogs fight over it.
453	8	Hare Trigger	MM	Friz Freleng	Michael Maltese	Manuel Perez, Ken Champin, Virgil Ross & Gerry Chiniquy	Bugs Bunny; Yosemite Sam	May 5, 1945	DVD: Golden Collection: Vol. 3 (extra, unrestored); DVD: Golden Collection: Vol. 6 (restored); Blu-Ray: Collector's Vault: Vol. 1 (restored)
Bugs Bunny is confronted by Western outlaw Yosemite Sam (in his debut), who is robbing a train of mail. Bugs plays a series of pranks on Sam to capture him. Notes: From this point on, almost all Bugs Bunny cartoons have a "Bugs Bunny"/"Bugs Bunny in" title card.; First Warner Bros. cartoon to fully credit all the main animators.
454	9	Ain't That Ducky	LT	Friz Freleng	Michael Maltese	Gerry Chiniquy	Daffy Duck	May 19, 1945	Blu-Ray: Collector's Vault: Vol. 2
Daffy Duck encounters a yellow duck with a briefcase, who tells him to shut up when he tries to help. This eventually leads to Daffy having to also face off with a hunter caricature modeled after (and voiced by) Victor Moore.
455	10	A Gruesome Twosome	MM	Bob Clampett	Warren Foster	Robert McKimson, Manny Gould, Rod Scribner, & Basil Davidovich; A.C. Gamer (effects)	Tweety	June 9, 1945	DVD: Golden Collection: Vol. 3 Blu-Ray/DVD: Platinum Collection: Vol. 3
A female cat attempts to end a love triangle involving her and her two suitors by proclaiming that she will choose the male who can bring her a bird as an offering. The two rival males choose Tweety as their prey, who persistently outwits them.
456	11	Tale of Two Mice	LT	Frank Tashlin (uncredited)	Warren Foster	Richard Bickenbach, Cal Dalton, Arthur Davis & Isadore Ellis	Babbit and Catstello (mice versions)	June 30, 1945	Blu-Ray: Collector's Choice: Vol. 1
Babbit and Catstello are mice who attempt to steal cheese guarded by a cat.
457	12	Wagon Heels	MM	Bob Clampett	Warren Foster	Rod Scribner, Isadore Ellis, Manny Gould & Bill Melendez	Porky Pig; Injun Joe; Sloppy Moe	July 28, 1945	DVD: Golden Collection: Vol. 5 DVD: Super Stars' Porky & Friends; Blu-Ray: Collector's Vault: Vol. 2
A color remake of Injun Trouble (1938).
458	13	Hare Conditioned	LT	Chuck Jones	Tedd Pierce	Ken Harris, Ben Washam, Basil Davidovich & Lloyd Vaughan	Bugs Bunny	August 11, 1945	DVD: Golden Collection: Vol. 2 Blu-Ray: Collector's Vault: Vol. 1
Bugs Bunny is chased by a department store manager, who wants to use him for taxidermy.
459	14	Fresh Airedale	MM	Chuck Jones	Michael Maltese	Ben Washam, Ken Harris & Lloyd Vaughan	N/A (one-shot cartoon)	August 25, 1945	DVD: Golden Collection: Vol. 6 Blu-Ray: Collector's Vault: Vol. 3
A very selfish, greedy dog named Shep gets all the love from his owner, while the much kinder cat gets kicked and misblamed for things Shep does. When Shep sees an article about a Scottish terrier being the "number one dog in the nation" and tries to get rid of him, it is up to the cat to save the day.
460	15	The Bashful Buzzard	LT	Bob Clampett	Michael Sasanoff	Robert McKimson	Beaky Buzzard	September 5, 1945	DVD: Golden Collection: Vol. 5 Blu-Ray/DVD: Platinum Collection: Vol. 2
Mama Buzzard kicks her son Beaky off the ledge after initially refusing to catch food for an evening stew.
461	16	Peck Up Your Troubles	MM	Friz Freleng	Michael Maltese	Virgil Ross, Gerry Chiniquy, Manuel Perez & Ken Champin	Sylvester; Hector the Bulldog	October 20, 1945	Blu-Ray: Collector's Choice: Vol. 4
Sylvester attempts to catch a woodpecker who has just moved into a tree.
462	17	Hare Tonic	LT	Chuck Jones	Tedd Pierce	Ken Harris, Lloyd Vaughan, Ben Washam & Basil Davidovich	Bugs Bunny; Elmer Fudd	November 10, 1945	DVD: Golden Collection: Vol. 3 Blu-Ray/DVD: Platinum Collection: Vol. 1
Elmer Fudd buys Bugs Bunny for the purpose of making him into "rabbit stew". To save his hide, Bugs tricks Elmer into thinking his house is full of "rabbititis" by disguising himself as a doctor.
463	18	Nasty Quacks	MM	Frank Tashlin (uncredited)	Warren Foster	Arthur Davis, Isadore Ellis & Richard Bickenbach	Daffy Duck	December 1, 1945	DVD: Super Stars' Daffy Duck; DVD: The Essential Daffy Duck; Blu-Ray/DVD: Platinum Collection: Vol. 3
Daffy Duck is an obnoxious pet duck owned by a human girl named Agnes. Her father, who has grown tired of Daffy's antics, tries to get rid of him.

== 1946 ==
No. overall	No. in year	Title	Series	Directed by	Story by	Animated by	Recurring characters	Original release date	Official DVD/Blu-Ray Availability
464	1	Book Revue	LT	Bob Clampett	Warren Foster	Robert McKimson, Rod Scribner, Manny Gould & Bill Melendez	Daffy Duck	January 5, 1946	DVD: Golden Collection: Vol. 2 DVD: The Essential Daffy Duck; Blu-Ray/DVD: Platinum Collection: Vol. 2
Various books come to life at midnight, mainly Daffy Duck from a comic book.
465	2	Baseball Bugs	LT	Friz Freleng	Michael Maltese	Manuel Perez, Ken Champin, Virgil Ross & Gerry Chiniquy	Bugs Bunny	February 2, 1946	DVD: Golden Collection: Vol. 1 DVD: The Essential Bugs Bunny; Blu-Ray/DVD: Platinum Collection: Vol. 1 Blu-Ray: Bugs Bunny 80th Anniversary Collection
After belittling the Gas-House Gorillas during a baseball game, the team forces Bugs Bunny to play against them all by himself.
466	3	Holiday for Shoestrings	MM	Friz Freleng	Michael Maltese & Tedd Pierce	Gerry Chiniquy, Manuel Perez, Ken Champin & Virgil Ross	N/A (one-shot cartoon)	February 23, 1946	DVD: Golden Collection: Vol. 5 Blu-Ray: Collector's Vault: Vol. 3
A parody of the classic fairy tale "The Elves and the Shoemaker" where Elmer Fudd-esque elves help a shoemaker named Jake.
467	4	Quentin Quail	MM	Chuck Jones	Tedd Pierce	Ben Washam, Ken Harris, Basil Davidovich & Lloyd Vaughan	N/A (one-shot cartoon)	March 2, 1946	Blu-Ray: Collector's Choice: Vol. 3
A quail goes through various trials and tribulations to try to get a worm for his baby daughter Toots.
468	5	Baby Bottleneck	LT	Bob Clampett	Warren Foster	Rod Scribner, Manny Gould, Bill Melendez & Isadore Ellis	Daffy Duck; Porky Pig; The Drunk Stork; Tweety (cameo)	March 16, 1946	DVD: Golden Collection: Vol. 2 Blu-Ray/DVD: Platinum Collection: Vol. 1
Porky Pig runs an animal baby factory, where Daffy Duck is tasked to answer phone calls.
469	6	Hare Remover	MM	Frank Tashlin & Robert McKimson (both uncredited)	Warren Foster	Richard Bickenbach, Arthur Davis, Cal Dalton & Isadore Ellis; A.C. Gamer (effects)	Bugs Bunny; Elmer Fudd	March 23, 1946	DVD: Golden Collection: Vol. 3 Blu-Ray: Collector's Vault: Vol. 2
Elmer Fudd is a mad scientist who tries to make a "Jekyll and Hyde potion", but his experiments always fail. After trapping Bugs Bunny, Elmer gives the potion to the rabbit, making him think a bear is Bugs.
470	7	Daffy Doodles	LT	Robert McKimson	Warren Foster	Richard Bickenbach, Arthur Davis, Cal Dalton & Isadore Ellis	Daffy Duck; Porky Pig	April 6, 1946	Blu-Ray: Collector's Choice: Vol. 1
Daffy Duck keeps painting every countenance with a mustache, leading to police officer Porky Pig to try to arrest him.
471	8	Hollywood Canine Canteen	MM	Robert McKimson	Warren Foster	Cal Dalton, Don Williams & Richard Bickenbach	Babbit and Catstello (dog versions)	April 20, 1946	DVD: Golden Collection: Vol. 6
A series of vignettes involving dog-styled caricatures of Hollywood celebrities at a nightclub.
472	9	Hush My Mouse	LT	Chuck Jones	Tedd Pierce	Ken Harris, Ben Washam, Lloyd Vaughan & Basil Davidovich	Sniffles	May 4, 1946	Blu-Ray/DVD: Mouse Chronicles
When a customer at Tuffy's Tavern asks for "mouse knuckles", the owner Tuffy sends his assistant Filligan to catch a mouse, but Sniffles plays a series of pranks on him.
473	10	Hair-Raising Hare	MM	Chuck Jones	Tedd Pierce	Ben Washam, Ken Harris, Basil Davidovich & Lloyd Vaughan	Bugs Bunny; Gossamer	May 25, 1946	DVD: Golden Collection: Vol. 1 (restored); DVD: Golden Collection: Vol. 3 (extra, unrestored); DVD: Golden Collection: Vol. 4 (extra, unrestored); DVD: The Essential Bugs Bunny (restored); Blu-Ray/DVD: Platinum Collection: Vol. 3 (restored); Blu-Ray: Bugs Bunny 80th Anniversary Collection (restored)
A mad scientist plans to catch Bugs Bunny to provide dinner for his large, hairy, orange-red, sneaker-wearing monster.
474	11	Kitty Kornered	LT	Bob Clampett	N/A	Manny Gould, Rod Scribner & Bill Melendez	Porky Pig; Sylvester	June 8, 1946	DVD: Golden Collection: Vol. 2 Blu-Ray/DVD: Platinum Collection: Vol. 1
Porky Pig tries to get his four cats out of his house on a cold, snowy night.
475	12	Hollywood Daffy	MM	Hawley Pratt (uncredited)	Michael Maltese	Ken Champin, Virgil Ross, Gerry Chiniquy & Manuel Perez	Daffy Duck	June 22, 1946	DVD: Golden Collection: Vol. 5 Blu-Ray: Collector's Vault: Vol. 3
Daffy Duck attempts to get into the "Warmer Bros." studio to see movie stars, while trying to dodge a security guard.
476	13	Acrobatty Bunny	LT	Robert McKimson	Warren Foster	Arthur Davis, Cal Dalton & Richard Bickenbach	Bugs Bunny	June 29, 1946	DVD: Golden Collection: Vol. 3 Blu-Ray/DVD: Platinum Collection: Vol. 3
Bugs Bunny encounters Nero, a lion residing above his rabbit hole amidst the setup of a circus. Bugs evades Nero from capturing him, especially in circus performances.
477	14	The Eager Beaver	MM	Chuck Jones	Tedd Pierce	Basil Davidovich, Ben Washam, Ken Harris & Lloyd Vaughan	N/A (one-shot cartoon)	July 13, 1946	Blu-Ray: Collector's Choice: Vol. 2
Eager Beaver attempts to chop down a tree on a mountain.
478	15	The Great Piggy Bank Robbery	LT	Bob Clampett	Warren Foster	Rod Scribner, Manny Gould, Bill Melendez & Isadore Ellis	Daffy Duck; Porky Pig (cameo)	July 20, 1946	DVD: Golden Collection: Vol. 2 DVD: The Essential Daffy Duck; Blu-Ray/DVD: Platinum Collection: Vol. 1
While reading a new Dick Tracy book, Daffy Duck imagines himself as "Duck Twacy", a detective who outfits villains and recovers stolen piggy banks.
479	16	Bacall to Arms	MM	Bob Clampett & Arthur Davis (both uncredited)	N/A	Manny Gould, Rod Scribner, Don Williams & Isadore Ellis	N/A (one-shot cartoon)	August 3, 1946	DVD: Golden Collection: Vol. 5
A newsreel and the main feature "To Have- To Have- To Have-" are shown at a movie theater.
480	17	Of Thee I Sting	LT	Friz Freleng	Michael Maltese	Virgil Ross, Gerry Chiniquy, Manuel Perez & Ken Champin	N/A (one-shot cartoon)	August 17, 1946	Blu-Ray: Collector's Vault: Vol. 3
Mosquitos attack a hapless man enjoying a day on a screened porch.
481	18	Walky Talky Hawky	MM	Robert McKimson	Warren Foster	Richard Bickenbach, Arthur Davis, Cal Dalton & Don Williams	Foghorn Leghorn; Henery Hawk; Barnyard Dawg	August 31, 1946	DVD: Golden Collection: Vol. 3 (restored); DVD: Golden Collection: Vol. 4 (extra, unrestored); Blu-Ray/DVD: Platinum Collection: Vol. 3 (restored)
Henery Hawk meets Foghorn Leghorn (in his debut cartoon), who, seeing the hawk as a potential pawn against the Barnyard Dawg, convinces Henery that he is a horse, while the Dawg is a chicken. Note: Nominated for the Academy Award for Best Animated Short Film in 1947.
482	19	Racketeer Rabbit	LT	Friz Freleng	Michael Maltese	Gerry Chiniquy, Manuel Perez, Ken Champin & Virgil Ross	Bugs Bunny; Rocky (prototype)	September 14, 1946	Blu-Ray: Bugs Bunny 80th Anniversary Collection
Bugs Bunny plays a series of pranks on gangsters Rocky (in his debut cartoon) and Hugo.
483	20	Fair and Worm-er	MM	Chuck Jones	Michael Maltese & Tedd Pierce	Basil Davidovich, Ben Washam, Ken Harris & Lloyd Vaughan	Pepé Le Pew	September 28, 1946	Blu-Ray: Collector's Choice: Vol. 2
A worm prepares to eat an apple with a knife and fork, but is chased by a crow, who is chased by a cat, who is chased by a bulldog, who is chased by a dog catcher, who is chased by his wife, who is chased by a mouse, who is chased by Pepé Le Pew.
484	21	The Big Snooze	LT	Bob Clampett (uncredited)	N/A	Rod Scribner, Isadore Ellis, Manny Gould & Bill Melendez	Bugs Bunny; Elmer Fudd	October 5, 1946	DVD: Golden Collection: Vol. 2 (restored); DVD: Golden Collection: Vol. 3 (extra, unrestored); Blu-Ray/DVD: Platinum Collection: Vol. 3 (restored)
Elmer Fudd falls asleep during his fishing trip. Bugs Bunny takes a sleeping pill to join Elmer in his dream.
485	22	The Mouse-Merized Cat	MM	Robert McKimson	Warren Foster	Richard Bickenbach, Cal Dalton, Arthur Davis & Don Williams	Babbit and Catstello (mice versions)	October 19, 1946	Blu-Ray: Collector's Choice: Vol. 4
Babbit and Catstello hypnotize each other to chase a cat away.
486	23	Mouse Menace	LT	Arthur Davis	George Hill	Manny Gould, Don Williams & Cal Dalton; A.C. Gamer (effects)	Porky Pig	November 2, 1946	DVD: Super Stars' Porky & Friends; Blu-Ray: Collector's Vault: Vol. 2
Porky Pig attempts to catch a mouse invading his house.
487	24	Rhapsody Rabbit	MM	Friz Freleng	Tedd Pierce & Michael Maltese	Manuel Perez, Ken Champin, Virgil Ross & Gerry Chiniquy	Bugs Bunny	November 9, 1946	DVD: Golden Collection: Vol. 2 (restored); DVD: Golden Collection: Vol. 4 (extra, unrestored); Blu-Ray: Collector's Vault: Vol. 1 (restored)
Bugs Bunny plays Franz Liszt's "Hungarian Rhapsody No. 2" on his piano, but a mouse keeps interrupting.
488	25	Roughly Squeaking	LT	Chuck Jones	Michael Maltese & Tedd Pierce	Basil Davidovich, Ben Washam, Ken Harris & Lloyd Vaughan	Hubie and Bertie	November 23, 1946	Blu-Ray/DVD: Mouse Chronicles
Hubie and Bertie shave a cat to convince him that he is a lion.

== 1947 ==
No. overall	No. in year	Title	Series	Directed by	Story by	Animated by	Recurring characters	Original release date	Official DVD/Blu-Ray Availability
489	1	One Meat Brawl	MM	Robert McKimson	Warren Foster	Cal Dalton, Richard Bickenbach, Isadore Ellis & Rod Scribner	Porky Pig; Barnyard Dawg	January 18, 1947	DVD: Super Stars' Porky & Friends (unrestored); Blu-Ray: Collector's Choice: Vol. 2 (restored)
Porky Pig and the Barnyard Dawg encounter Grover Groundhog.
490	2	Goofy Gophers	LT	Bob Clampett & Arthur Davis (both uncredited)	Warren Foster	Manny Gould, Don Williams, Cal Dalton & Bill Melendez	Goofy Gophers; Bugs Bunny (cameo)	January 25, 1947	Blu-Ray: Collector's Vault: Vol. 1
The Goofy Gophers Mac and Tosh (in their debut cartoon) attempt to steal carrots.
491	3	The Gay Anties	MM	Friz Freleng	Michael Maltese & Tedd Pierce	Ken Champin, Virgil Ross, Gerry Chiniquy & Manuel Perez	N/A (one-shot cartoon)	February 15, 1947	Blu-Ray: Collector's Vault: Vol. 3
A colony of ants surreptitiously invade a young couple's park picnic in the 1890s and contrive to steal their food.
492	4	Scent-imental Over You	LT	Chuck Jones	Michael Maltese & Tedd Pierce	Phil Monroe, Ben Washam, Ken Harris & Lloyd Vaughan	Pepé Le Pew	March 8, 1947	DVD: Super Stars' Pepé Le Pew; Blu-Ray: Collector's Vault: Vol. 2
A Mexican hairless dog, who wants to be friends with other dogs, borrows a skunk pelt, frightens all of the other dogs, and attracts the unwanted attention of the actual skunk Pepé Le Pew.
493	5	A Hare Grows in Manhattan	MM	Friz Freleng	Michael Maltese & Tedd Pierce	Virgil Ross, Gerry Chiniquy, Manuel Perez & Ken Champin	Bugs Bunny; Hector the Bulldog	March 22, 1947	DVD: Golden Collection: Vol. 3 Blu-Ray/DVD: Platinum Collection: Vol. 3
Bugs Bunny talks to Lola Beverly about his recurrent encounters with a street gang of stray dogs, including Hector the Bulldog.
494	6	Birth of a Notion	LT	Robert McKimson	Warren Foster	Richard Bickenbach, Cal Dalton, Isadore Ellis & Rod Scribner	Daffy Duck	April 12, 1947	DVD: Golden Collection: Vol. 6 Blu-Ray: Collector's Vault: Vol. 1
Daffy Duck stays with Leopold the dog for the winter, but is confronted by a scientist who wants to take his wishbone.
495	7	Tweetie Pie	MM	Friz Freleng (Note: Planned by Bob Clampett, but was uncredited.)	Tedd Pierce & Michael Maltese	Gerry Chiniquy, Manuel Perez, Ken Champin & Virgil Ross	Tweety; Sylvester	May 3, 1947	DVD: Golden Collection: Vol. 2 DVD: Warner Bros. Home Entertainment Academy Awards Animation Collection; DVD: Super Stars' Tweety & Sylvester; Blu-Ray/DVD: Platinum Collection: Vol. 1
Thomas the Cat persistently endeavors to capture Tweety, a canary he discovers outside seeking warmth from a smoldering cigar stub amidst wintry conditions. However, Thomas' owner tells him to not disturb Tweety in his cage in her house. Notes: First pairing of Sylvester and Tweety.; Won the Academy Award for Best Animated Short Film in 1948.
496	8	Rabbit Transit	LT	Friz Freleng	Michael Maltese & Tedd Pierce	Manuel Perez, Ken Champin, Virgil Ross & Gerry Chiniquy; A.C. Gamer (effects)	Bugs Bunny; Cecil Turtle	May 10, 1947	DVD: Golden Collection: Vol. 2 Blu-Ray/DVD: Platinum Collection: Vol. 2
Bugs Bunny confronts Cecil Turtle to race him. Both try to use tactics to outwit the other.
497	9	Hobo Bobo	MM	Robert McKimson	Warren Foster	Rod Scribner, Richard Bickenbach & Isadore Ellis	Bobo the Elephant; Minah Bird	May 17, 1947	Blu-Ray: Collector's Choice: Vol. 3
Bobo, a baby Indian elephant, moves to America to join a circus baseball team.
498	10	Along Came Daffy	LT	Friz Freleng	Michael Maltese & Tedd Pierce	Manuel Perez, Ken Champin, Virgil Ross & Gerry Chiniquy	Daffy Duck; Yosemite Sam	June 14, 1947	Blu-Ray: Collector's Choice: Vol. 4
Yosemite Sam and his black-haired twin are snowbound in a cabin with no food. When Daffy Duck arrives, they try to eat him.
499	11	Inki at the Circus	MM	Chuck Jones	Michael Maltese & Tedd Pierce	Ben Washam, Ken Harris, Phil Monroe, Lloyd Vaughan	Inki; Minah Bird	June 21, 1947	N/A
Inki is chased by two dogs at a circus.
500	12	Easter Yeggs	LT	Robert McKimson	Warren Foster	Charles McKimson, Richard Bickenbach & Isadore Ellis	Bugs Bunny; Elmer Fudd	June 28, 1947	DVD: Golden Collection: Vol. 3 Blu-Ray/DVD: Platinum Collection: Vol. 3
Bugs Bunny overhears the depressed Easter Bunny, who tricks Bugs into filling in for him. Meanwhile, Elmer Fudd prepares a trap to cook the Easter Bunny for "Easter rabbit stew".
501	13	Crowing Pains	LT	Robert McKimson	Warren Foster	Manny Gould, Charles McKimson, John Carey & Isadore Ellis	Foghorn Leghorn; Barnyard Dawg; Henery Hawk; Sylvester	July 12, 1947	DVD: Golden Collection: Vol. 6 Blu-Ray: Collector's Vault: Vol. 2
Sylvester goes on a series of misadventures with Henery Hawk, Foghorn Leghorn, and the Barnyard Dawg after he starts attempting to steal a bone from the doghouse.
502	14	A Pest in the House	MM	Chuck Jones	Tedd Pierce & Michael Maltese	Ben Washam, Ken Harris, Basil Davidovich & Lloyd Vaughan	Daffy Duck; Elmer Fudd	August 2, 1947	DVD: Golden Collection: Vol. 5 Blu-Ray/DVD: Platinum Collection: Vol. 1
Daffy Duck and Elmer Fudd work at the "Gland Hotel", where a tired guest warns manager Elmer not to wake him up...or else.
503	15	The Foxy Duckling	MM	Arthur Davis	George Hill	Manny Gould, Don Williams & Bill Melendez	N/A (one-shot cartoon)	August 23, 1947	Blu-Ray: Collector's Choice: Vol. 1
An insomniac fox attempts to catch a duck to put its feathers in a pillow for a good night's sleep.
504	16	House Hunting Mice	LT	Chuck Jones	Michael Maltese & Tedd Pierce	Phil Monroe, Ben Washam, Lloyd Vaughan & Ken Harris	Hubie and Bertie	September 6, 1947	Blu-Ray/DVD: Mouse Chronicles
Hubie and Bertie explore the "Super House - The House of Tomorrow".
505	17	Little Orphan Airedale	LT	Chuck Jones	Michael Maltese & Tedd Pierce	Phil Monroe, Ben Washam, Ken Harris & Lloyd Vaughan	Charlie Dog; Porky Pig	October 4, 1947	Blu-Ray: Collector's Choice: Vol. 1
Rags McMutt escapes from a dog pound and meets Charlie Dog, who tells Rags about the troubles he had with Porky Pig.
506	18	Doggone Cats	MM	Arthur Davis	Lloyd Turner & Bill Scott	Basil Davidovich, Bill Melendez, Don Williams & Emery Hawkins	Sylvester; Wellington	October 25, 1947	Blu-Ray: Collector's Choice: Vol. 1
A dog named Wellington is given a package to deliver to Uncle Louie. Wellington outsmarts Sylvester and an orange cat along the way to Uncle Louie's house.
507	19	Slick Hare	MM	Friz Freleng	Tedd Pierce & Michael Maltese	Virgil Ross, Gerry Chiniquy, Manuel Perez & Ken Champin	Bugs Bunny; Elmer Fudd	November 1, 1947	DVD: Golden Collection: Vol. 2 Blu-Ray/DVD: Platinum Collection: Vol. 3
Elmer Fudd serves as a waiter at the Mocrumbo club. When Humphrey Bogart asks for "fried rabbit", Elmer finds Bugs Bunny, who outsmarts him.
508	20	Mexican Joyride	LT	Arthur Davis	Dave Monahan	Don Williams, Basil Davidovich, Bill Melendez & Herman Cohen	Daffy Duck	November 29, 1947	Blu-Ray: Collector's Choice: Vol. 3
Daffy Duck drives to Mexico for a vacation.
509	21	Catch as Cats Can	MM	Arthur Davis	Dave Monahan	Basil Davidovich, Bill Melendez, Don Williams & Herman Cohen; A.C. Gamer (effects)	Sylvester	December 6, 1947	Blu-Ray: Collector's Choice: Vol. 1
A pipe-puffing parrot tells Sylvester that he needs more vitamins. However, the canary who has been eating the vitamins in bulk consistently stops Sylvester.
510	22	A Horse Fly Fleas	LT	Robert McKimson	Warren Foster	Charles McKimson, Phil DeLara, Manny Gould & John Carey; A.C. Gamer (effects)	A. Flea	December 13, 1947	Blu-Ray/DVD: Platinum Collection: Vol. 2
A. Flea, accompanied by a horse fly, tries to find a good home. They settle on a dog, not knowing that it is the house of an Indian flea.

== 1948 ==
No. overall	No. in year	Title	Series	Directed by	Story by	Animated by	Recurring characters	Original release date	Official DVD/Blu-Ray Availability
511	1	Gorilla My Dreams	LT	Robert McKimson	Warren Foster	Charles McKimson, Manny Gould & John Carey	Bugs Bunny; Gruesome Gorilla	January 3, 1948	DVD: Golden Collection: Vol. 2 Blu-Ray/DVD: Platinum Collection: Vol. 3
Mama Gorilla adopts Bugs Bunny as her child, much to the displeasure of her husband Gruesome.
512	2	Two Gophers from Texas	MM	Arthur Davis	Bill Scott & Lloyd Turner	Basil Davidovich, Don Williams, Bill Melendez & Emery Hawkins	Goofy Gophers	January 17, 1948	Blu-Ray: Collector's Choice: Vol. 1
A dog reading a book finds four ways to get the Goofy Gophers, but despite all attempts is outsmarted.
513	3	A Feather in His Hare	LT	Chuck Jones	Michael Maltese & Tedd Pierce	Ken Harris, Phil Monroe, Ben Washam & Lloyd Vaughan	Bugs Bunny	February 7, 1948	Blu-Ray: Collector's Vault: Vol. 3
Bugs Bunny outsmarts an Ed Wynn-esque Indian.
514	4	What Makes Daffy Duck	LT	Arthur Davis	Lloyd Turner & Bill Scott	Basil Davidovich, Bill Melendez, Don Williams & Emery Hawkins	Daffy Duck; Elmer Fudd	February 14, 1948	Blu-Ray/DVD: Platinum Collection: Vol. 2
Daffy Duck finds himself in a perilous situation during duck hunting season and employs his cunning to outsmart both Elmer Fudd and a fox named Fortescue.
515	5	What's Brewin', Bruin?	LT	Chuck Jones	Michael Maltese & Tedd Pierce	Lloyd Vaughan, Ken Harris, Phil Monro & Ben Washam	The Three Bears	February 28, 1948	Blu-Ray: Collector's Choice: Vol. 1
The Three Bears (Henry, Mama and Junyer) get ready to hibernate for winter, but Henry gets annoyed by various things.
516	6	Daffy Duck Slept Here	MM	Robert McKimson	Warren Foster	Manny Gould, Charles McKimson & Isadore Ellis	Daffy Duck; Porky Pig	March 6, 1948	DVD: Golden Collection: Vol. 3
With a convention taking up every room in town, Porky Pig has to share a hotel room with Daffy Duck, who, throughout the night, frustrates him.
517	7	A Hick, a Slick, and a Chick	MM	Arthur Davis	Lloyd Turner & Bill Scott	Bill Melendez, Don Williams, Emery Hawkins & Basil Davidovich	N/A (one-shot cartoon)	March 13, 1948	Blu-Ray: Collector's Choice: Vol. 2
Mice Elmo (the Hick) and Blackie (the Slick) compete for the affection of Daisy Lou (the Chick).
518	8	Back Alley Oproar	MM	Friz Freleng	Michael Maltese & Tedd Pierce	Gerry Chiniquy, Manuel Perez, Ken Champin & Virgil Ross	Elmer Fudd; Sylvester	March 27, 1948	DVD: Golden Collection: Vol. 2 Blu-Ray/DVD: Platinum Collection: Vol. 2
Elmer Fudd is ready for bed, but Sylvester's singing interrupts his sleep.
519	9	I Taw a Putty Tat	MM	Friz Freleng	Tedd Pierce	Virgil Ross, Gerry Chiniquy, Manuel Perez & Ken Champin	Tweety; Sylvester; Hector the Bulldog	April 2, 1948	DVD: Golden Collection: Vol. 4 (extra, unrestored & uncensored); Blu-Ray: Collector's Vault: Vol. 2 (restored & uncensored)
Sylvester has already devoured five canaries and his owner orders a new one, but Tweety is determined not to be number six.
520	10	Rabbit Punch	MM	Chuck Jones	Michael Maltese & Tedd Pierce	Phil Monroe, Ken Harris, Lloyd Vaughan & Ben Washam	Bugs Bunny; The Crusher	April 10, 1948	DVD: Golden Collection: Vol. 3 Blu-Ray: Collector's Vault: Vol. 1
In a World Championship boxing match, Bugs Bunny's loud booing displeases the champion The Crusher, so Bugs is thrown into the boxing ring and must use strategy against The Crusher's brute strength.
521	11	Hop, Look and Listen	LT	Robert McKimson	Warren Foster	Charles McKimson, Manny Gould & Isadore Ellis	Hippety Hopper; Sylvester; The Talking Bulldog	April 17, 1948	DVD: Super Stars' Sylvester & Hippety Hopper
Hippety Hopper (in his debut cartoon) escapes from a zoo and is mistaken by Sylvester as a mouse.
522	12	Nothing But the Tooth	MM	Arthur Davis	Dave Monahan	Bill Melendez, Don Williams, John Carey & Basil Davidovich	Porky Pig	May 1, 1948	Blu-Ray: Collector's Vault: Vol. 3
Porky Pig travels by horse-pulled, covered wagon to California to join in the 1848 Gold Rush. Along the way, he outsmarts an Indian by ducking at appropriate times.
523	13	Buccaneer Bunny	LT	Friz Freleng	Michael Maltese & Tedd Pierce	Manuel Perez, Ken Champin, Virgil Ross & Gerry Chiniquy	Bugs Bunny; Yosemite Sam	May 8, 1948	DVD: Golden Collection: Vol. 5 Blu-Ray/DVD: Platinum Collection: Vol. 1
When pirate Sea-Goin' Sam tries to bury his treasure in Bugs Bunny's rabbit hole, the two end up chasing each other aboard Sam's ship.
524	14	Bone Sweet Bone	MM	Arthur Davis	Lloyd Turner & Bill Scott	Don Williams, Emery Hawkins, Basil Davidovich & Bill Melendez	N/A (one-shot cartoon)	May 22, 1948	Blu-Ray: Collector's Vault: Vol. 2
Silent dog Shep steals a dinosaur bone and goes on a quest to retrieve his soup bone from a bulldog.
525	15	Bugs Bunny Rides Again	MM	Friz Freleng	Tedd Pierce & Michael Maltese	Ken Champin, Virgil Ross, Gerry Chiniquy & Manuel Perez	Bugs Bunny; Yosemite Sam	June 12, 1948	DVD: Golden Collection: Vol. 2 Blu-Ray: Bugs Bunny 80th Anniversary Collection
After Yosemite Sam chases everyone out of a saloon, he battles Bugs Bunny in various different ways in the Old West.
526	16	The Rattled Rooster	LT	Arthur Davis	Dave Monahan	Don Williams, John Carey, Basil Davidovich & Bill Melendez	N/A (one-shot cartoon)	June 26, 1948	Blu-Ray: Collector's Vault: Vol. 2
A frustrated rooster attempts to catch a precocious worm. However, the tables turn when the rooster finds himself being chased by an amorous female rattlesnake.
527	17	The Up-Standing Sitter	LT	Robert McKimson	Warren Foster	Phil DeLara, Manny Gould, John Carey & Charles McKimson	Daffy Duck; The Talking Bulldog	July 3, 1948	DVD: Golden Collection: Vol. 5
Daffy Duck, employed by a baby-sitting agency, is tasked with watching over a hen's egg on a farm. But after the egg hatches, the new hatchling doesn't like the idea of being looked after by a "stranger".
528	18	The Shell Shocked Egg	MM	Robert McKimson	Warren Foster	Charles McKimson, Manny Gould & Isadore Ellis	N/A (one-shot cartoon)	July 10, 1948	Blu-Ray: Act of Violence (extra, restored)
A baby turtle named Clem is only partly hatched and looks for a place to finish hatching while running into a dog and rooster who break out into a feud over ownership of the egg. Meanwhile, Clem's family looks for him at the beach.
529	19	Haredevil Hare	LT	Chuck Jones	Michael Maltese	Ben Washam, Lloyd Vaughan, Ken Harris & Phil Monroe; A.C. Gamer (effects)	Bugs Bunny; Marvin the Martian; K-9	July 24, 1948	DVD: Golden Collection: Vol. 1 DVD: The Essential Bugs Bunny; Blu-Ray/DVD: Platinum Collection: Vol. 1 Blu-Ray: Bugs Bunny 80th Anniversary Collection
Reluctant astro-rabbit Bugs Bunny is sent to the Moon and meets Marvin (in his debut cartoon), a Martian who intends to blow up the Earth.
530	20	You Were Never Duckier	MM	Chuck Jones	Tedd Pierce	Ken Harris, Phil Monroe, Ben Washam & Lloyd Vaughan	Daffy Duck; Henery Hawk	August 7, 1948	DVD: Golden Collection: Vol. 5 Blu-Ray: Collector's Vault: Vol. 2
Daffy Duck, outraged by the low prize for ducks at the National Poultry Show, disguises himself as a rooster to win the $5,000 prize. However, his plan goes awry when he is mistaken for a chicken and taken home by Henery Hawk.
531	21	Dough Ray Me-ow	MM	Arthur Davis	Lloyd Turner	Basil Davidovich, Bill Melendez, Don Williams & Emery Hawkins	N/A (one-shot cartoon)	August 14, 1948	DVD: Golden Collection: Vol. 4 Blu-Ray/DVD: Platinum Collection: Vol. 2
Louie, a green pet parrot, constantly looks after a very dumb cat named Heathcliff. When Louie finds out that Heathcliff's owner left him a million dollars in their will, and that Louie will inherit the money should Heathcliff disappear, Louie tries to kill him to inherit his money.
532	22	Hot Cross Bunny	MM	Robert McKimson	Warren Foster	Manny Gould, Charles McKimson & Phil DeLara	Bugs Bunny	August 21, 1948	Blu-Ray: Bugs Bunny 80th Anniversary Collection
Bugs Bunny is "Experimental Rabbit #46" in the Eureka Hospital Experimental Laboratory, Paul Revere Foundation, where a scientist plans to switch his brain with that of a chicken.
533	23	The Pest That Came to Dinner	LT	Arthur Davis	George Hill	John Carey, Basil Davidovich, Bill Melendez & Don Williams	Porky Pig	September 11, 1948	DVD: Super Stars' Porky & Friends; Blu-Ray: Collector's Vault: Vol. 2
Pierre, the biggest and hungriest termite in the world, invades Porky Pig's house by eating everything inside of it.
534	24	Hare Splitter	MM	Friz Freleng	Tedd Pierce	Gerry Chiniquy, Manuel Perez, Ken Champin & Virgil Ross	Bugs Bunny	September 25, 1948	Blu-Ray: Bugs Bunny 80th Anniversary Collection
Similar to A Hick, a Slick, and a Chick, but with Daisy Lou as a rabbit instead of a mouse, and Bugs Bunny and his next-door neighbor Casbah as competitors for her affection.
535	25	Odor of the Day	LT	Arthur Davis	Lloyd Turner	Bill Melendez, Don Williams, Emery Hawkins & Basil Davidovich	Pepé Le Pew; Wellington	October 2, 1948	DVD: Super Stars' Pepé Le Pew; Blu-Ray: Collector's Vault: Vol. 2
Wellington the Dog, desperate to find shelter to warm himself up, enters Pepé Le Pew's house, and tries to get rid of him.
536	26	The Foghorn Leghorn	MM	Robert McKimson	Warren Foster	Charles McKimson, Manny Gould, Phil DeLara, John Carey & Pete Burness	Foghorn Leghorn; Henery Hawk; Barnyard Dawg	October 9, 1948	DVD: Golden Collection: Vol. 1 Blu-Ray/DVD: Platinum Collection: Vol. 2
After his father fails to catch any chickens due to Foghorn Leghorn stopping him, Henery Hawk tries to catch a chicken for himself. He refuses to catch Foghorn, due to his father calling him earlier a "loud mouthed schnook", so Henery sets his sights on Barnyard Dawg, despite him protesting that he is not a chicken.
537	27	A-Lad-In His Lamp	LT	Robert McKimson	Warren Foster	Phil DeLara, Manny Gould, John Carey & Charles McKimson; A.C. Gamer (effects)	Bugs Bunny	October 23, 1948	Blu-Ray: Collector's Vault: Vol. 2
Bugs Bunny finds Aladdin's lamp in his rabbit hole, summoning a lazy genie caricature modeled after (and voiced by) Jim Backus.
538	28	Daffy Dilly	MM	Chuck Jones	Michael Maltese	Ben Washam, Lloyd Vaughan, Ken Harris & Phil Monroe; A.C. Gamer (effects)	Daffy Duck	October 30, 1948	DVD: Super Stars' Daffy Duck; Blu-Ray: Collector's Vault: Vol. 1
Daffy Duck, a struggling novelty salesman, learns that tycoon J.B. Cubish will pay $1 million to anyone who can make him laugh before he dies. However, Cubish's butler proves an obstacle to Daffy's gaining entry to the mansion.
539	29	Kit for Cat	LT	Friz Freleng	Michael Maltese & Tedd Pierce	Virgil Ross, Gerry Chiniquy, Manuel Perez & Ken Champin	Elmer Fudd; Sylvester	November 6, 1948	DVD: Golden Collection: Vol. 1
Elmer Fudd adopts Sylvester and an unnamed kitten on a cold, snowy night.
540	30	The Stupor Salesman	LT	Arthur Davis	Lloyd Turner & Bill Scott	Bill Melendez, Don Williams, Emery Hawkins & Basil Davidovich	Daffy Duck	November 20, 1948	DVD: Golden Collection: Vol. 5 Blu-Ray: Platinum Collection: Vol. 3
Salesman Daffy Duck attempts to sell items to Slug McSlug, a cunning canine criminal who has successfully robbed a bank.
541	31	Riff Raffy Daffy	LT	Arthur Davis	Bill Scott & Lloyd Turner	Don Williams, Emery Hawkins, Basil Davidovich & Bill Melendez	Daffy Duck; Porky Pig	November 27, 1948	DVD: Super Stars' Porky & Friends (unrestored); Blu-Ray: Collector's Choice: Vol. 3 (restored)
Daffy Duck faces arrest from patrol officer Porky Pig for violating vagrancy laws.
542	32	My Bunny Lies over the Sea	MM	Chuck Jones	Michael Maltese	Ken Harris, Phil Monroe, Ben Washam & Lloyd Vaughan	Bugs Bunny	December 4, 1948	DVD: Golden Collection: Vol. 1
While traveling to the La Brea Tar Pits, Bugs Bunny takes a wrong turn and encounters Angus MacRory in Loch Lomond, Scotland, where they play golf.
543	33	Scaredy Cat	MM	Chuck Jones	Michael Maltese	Lloyd Vaughan, Ken Harris, Phil Monroe & Ben Washam	Porky Pig; Sylvester	December 18, 1948	DVD: Golden Collection: Vol. 1 Blu-Ray/DVD: Platinum Collection: Vol. 1
Porky Pig and Sylvester move into an old Gothic-style house. While Porky goes to bed, Sylvester explores the house, which is full of things that frighten him.

== 1949 ==
No. overall	No. in year	Title	Series	Directed by	Story by	Animated by	Recurring characters	Original release date	Official DVD/Blu-Ray Availability
544	1	Wise Quackers	LT	Friz Freleng	Tedd Pierce	Manuel Perez, Pete Burness, Ken Champin, Virgil Ross & Gerry Chiniquy	Daffy Duck; Elmer Fudd	January 1, 1949	DVD: Super Stars' Daffy Duck; Blu-Ray: Collector's Vault: Vol. 2
Daffy Duck, struggling to keep up with migrating birds, crash-lands in Elmer Fudd's farmyard, where Daffy works for him in exchange for his life.
545	2	Hare Do	MM	Friz Freleng	Tedd Pierce	Ken Champin, Virgil Ross, Gerry Chiniquy & Manuel Perez	Bugs Bunny; Elmer Fudd	January 15, 1949	DVD: Golden Collection: Vol. 3
Elmer Fudd chases Bugs Bunny in various theaters.
546	3	Holiday for Drumsticks	MM	Arthur Davis	Lloyd Turner	Emery Hawkins, Basil Davidovich, Bill Melendez & Don Williams	Daffy Duck; Tom Turk	January 22, 1949	Blu-Ray: Collector's Choice: Vol. 4
A hillbilly husband brings home Tom Turk, and his wife prepares some food to fatten him up for the upcoming Thanksgiving. Daffy Duck tries to "help" Tom Turk by thinning him before Thanksgiving.
547	4	Awful Orphan	MM	Chuck Jones	Michael Maltese	Phil Monroe, Ben Washam, Lloyd Vaughan & Ken Harris	Charlie Dog; Porky Pig	January 29, 1949	DVD: Golden Collection: Vol. 1 Blu-Ray: Collector's Vault: Vol. 2
Charlie Dog arrives in Porky Pig's hotel room via a pet shop truck.
548	5	Porky Chops	LT	Arthur Davis	Bill Scott & Lloyd Turner	Don Williams, Emery Hawkins, Basil Davidovich & Bill Melendez	Porky Pig	February 12, 1949	DVD: Golden Collection: Vol. 1 Blu-Ray/DVD: Platinum Collection: Vol. 1
The Hipster Squirrel, spending his vacation in the North Woods, notices Porky Pig attempting to chop down the tree he is sleeping in.
549	6	Mississippi Hare	LT	Chuck Jones	Michael Maltese	Ben Washam, Lloyd Vaughan, Ken Harris & Phil Monroe	Bugs Bunny; Colonel Shuffle	February 26, 1949	DVD: Golden Collection: Vol. 4 Blu-Ray: Collector's Vault: Vol. 3
Accidentally loaded onto a Mississippi riverboat, Bugs Bunny encounters riverboat gambler Colonel Shuffle.
550	7	Paying the Piper	LT	Robert McKimson	Warren Foster	Manny Gould, John Carey, Charles McKimson & Phil DeLara	Porky Pig; The Supreme Cat	March 12, 1949	DVD: Golden Collection: Vol. 5
The people of Hamelin celebrate the high rat population being driven from the town. The cats, learning that they lost their main food source, go to the Supreme Cat for a solution. Meanwhile, Pied Piper Porky Pig is told by the mayor that he will not be paid until all of the rats are gone, so The Supreme Cat disguises himself as a giant rat to prevent Porky from being paid.
551	8	Daffy Duck Hunt	LT	Robert McKimson	Warren Foster	John Carey, Charles McKimson, Phil DeLara & Manny Gould	Daffy Duck; Porky Pig; Barnyard Dawg	March 26, 1949	DVD: Golden Collection: Vol. 1
Daffy Duck evades Porky Pig and the Barnyard Dawg from catching or shooting him.
552	9	Rebel Rabbit	MM	Robert McKimson	Warren Foster	Charles McKimson, Phil DeLara, Manny Gould & John Carey	Bugs Bunny	April 9, 1949	DVD: Golden Collection: Vol. 3
Bugs Bunny finds the 10-cent bounty on rabbits to be offensive. After being informed that rabbits are considered harmless, he sets out to prove how dangerous he can be, vandalizing monuments and landmarks throughout the United States.
553	10	Mouse Wreckers	LT	Chuck Jones	Michael Maltese	Lloyd Vaughan, Ken Harris, Phil Monroe & Ben Washam	Claude Cat; Hubie and Bertie	April 23, 1949	DVD: Golden Collection: Vol. 2 DVD: Warner Bros. Home Entertainment Academy Awards Animation Collection; Blu-Ray/DVD: Mouse Chronicles
Hubie and Bertie attempt to move into a new home by chasing Claude Cat out. Note: Nominated for the Academy Award for Best Animated Short Film in 1949.
554	11	High Diving Hare	LT	Friz Freleng	Tedd Pierce	Gerry Chiniquy, Manuel Perez, Ken Champin, Virgil Ross & Pete Burness	Bugs Bunny; Yosemite Sam	April 30, 1949	DVD: Golden Collection: Vol. 1 Blu-Ray/DVD: Platinum Collection: Vol. 3
In a Wild West vaudeville theater, Bugs Bunny tricks Yosemite Sam into repeatedly doing the high diving act.
555	12	The Bee-Deviled Bruin	MM	Chuck Jones	Michael Maltese	Ken Harris, Phil Monroe, Ben Washam & Lloyd Vaughan; A.C. Gamer (effects)	The Three Bears	May 14, 1949	Blu-Ray: Collector's Choice: Vol. 1
Thinking the family's out of honey, Henry Bear attempts to get honey from a beehive.
556	13	Curtain Razor	LT	Friz Freleng	Tedd Pierce	Manuel Perez, Ken Champin, Virgil Ross & Pete Burness	Porky Pig	May 21, 1949	DVD: Super Stars' Porky & Friends
A "spot gag" cartoon featuring acts on a stage by various performers, most of which are rejected by judge Porky Pig.
557	14	Bowery Bugs	MM	Arthur Davis	Lloyd Turner & Bill Scott	Emery Hawkins, Basil Davidovich, Bill Melendez & Don Williams	Bugs Bunny	June 4, 1949	DVD: Golden Collection: Vol. 3 Blu-Ray: Collector's Vault: Vol. 2
Bugs Bunny tells an old man the true story about how and why Steve Brodie jumped off the Brooklyn Bridge in 1886.
558	15	Mouse Mazurka	MM	Friz Freleng	Tedd Pierce	Gerry Chiniquy, Ken Champin, Virgil Ross & Manuel Perez	Sylvester	June 11, 1949	Blu-Ray/DVD: Mouse Chronicles (extra, unrestored)
Sylvester chases a mouse in the Slobovian Mountains.
559	16	Long-Haired Hare	LT	Chuck Jones	Michael Maltese	Phil Monroe, Ben Washam, Lloyd Vaughan & Ken Harris	Bugs Bunny	June 25, 1949	DVD: Golden Collection: Vol. 1 Blu-Ray/DVD: Platinum Collection: Vol. 2
After opera singer Giovanni Jones takes serious offence at Bugs Bunny's inadvertently disrupting his rehearsals, Bugs retaliates during the maestro's performance.
560	17	Henhouse Henery	LT	Robert McKimson	Warren Foster	Manny Gould, John Carey, Charles McKimson, Pete Burness & Phil DeLara	Foghorn Leghorn; Henery Hawk; Barnyard Dawg	July 2, 1949	Blu-Ray: Collector's Choice: Vol. 4
Henery Hawk goes on a quest to catch a chicken, but is repeatedly stopped by Foghorn Leghorn.
561	18	Knights Must Fall	MM	Friz Freleng	Tedd Pierce	Ken Champin, Virgil Ross, Manuel Perez & Gerry Chiniquy	Bugs Bunny	July 16, 1949	Blu-Ray: Bugs Bunny 80th Anniversary Collection
In a spoof of the King Arthur mythology, Bugs Bunny faces off against "Sir Pantsalot of Drop Seat Manor" in a tournament.
562	19	Bad Ol' Putty Tat	MM	Friz Freleng	Tedd Pierce	Gerry Chiniquy, Manuel Perez, Ken Champin & Virgil Ross	Tweety; Sylvester	July 23, 1949	DVD: Golden Collection: Vol. 2 DVD: Super Stars' Tweety & Sylvester
Tweety attempts to evade Sylvester with a series of various tricks from outside of his birdhouse.
563	20	The Grey Hounded Hare	LT	Robert McKimson	Warren Foster	John Carey, Charles McKimson, Phil DeLara & Manny Gould	Bugs Bunny	August 6, 1949	DVD: Golden Collection: Vol. 4
Bugs Bunny winds up at a dog-racing track and becomes enamored with the mechanical female hare being chased by the greyhounds.
564	21	Often an Orphan	MM	Chuck Jones	Michael Maltese	Lloyd Vaughan, Ken Harris, Phil Monroe & Ben Washam	Charlie Dog; Porky Pig	August 13, 1949	DVD: Golden Collection: Vol. 6 Blu-Ray: Collector's Vault: Vol. 2
Charlie Dog attempts to get Porky Pig to adopt him after his old owner dumps him at Porky's farm on a trip disguised as a picnic. Charlie instead irritates Porky, who tries to get rid of the dog in various ways, but fails each time.
565	22	The Windblown Hare	LT	Robert McKimson	Warren Foster	Charles McKimson, Phil DeLara, Manny Gould & John Carey	Bugs Bunny	August 27, 1949	DVD: Golden Collection: Vol. 3 Blu-Ray: Collector's Vault: Vol. 3
Bugs Bunny is conned by the Three Little Pigs (presented here as obnoxious jerks) into buying their straw and wooden houses, which get destroyed by the Big Bad Wolf. When Bugs learns the Big Bad Wolf was only doing what the book told him to do, the two team up against the pigs.
566	23	Dough for the Do-Do	MM	Friz Freleng (uncredited)	N/A	N/A	Porky Pig; Yoyo Dodo	September 3, 1949	DVD: Golden Collection: Vol. 1
A color remake of Porky in Wackyland.
567	24	Fast and Furry-ous	LT	Chuck Jones	Michael Maltese	Ken Harris, Phil Monroe, Ben Washam & Lloyd Vaughan; A.C. Gamer (effects)	Wile E. Coyote and the Road Runner	September 17, 1949	DVD: Golden Collection: Vol. 1 Blu-Ray/DVD: Platinum Collection: Vol. 1
In their first cartoon, Wile E. Coyote attempts to catch the Road Runner through many traps and products across 12 different plans.
568	25	Each Dawn I Crow	MM	Friz Freleng	Tedd Pierce	Virgil Ross, Gerry Chiniquy, Manuel Perez & Ken Champin	Elmer Fudd	September 24, 1949	Blu-Ray: Collector's Vault: Vol. 1
Elmer Fudd attempts to catch John Rooster for his dinner.
569	26	Frigid Hare	MM	Chuck Jones	Michael Maltese	Phil Monroe, Ben Washam, Lloyd Vaughan & Ken Harris	Bugs Bunny; Playboy Penguin	October 8, 1949	DVD: Golden Collection: Vol. 1 Blu-Ray: Collector's Vault: Vol. 2
Somehow winding up in the South Pole while trying to go on vacation, Bugs Bunny encounters Playboy Penguin, who is being chased by a hungry Eskimo.
570	27	Swallow the Leader	LT	Robert McKimson	Warren Foster	Phil DeLara, Pete Burness, John Carey & Charles McKimson; A.C. Gamer (effects)	The Supreme Cat	October 15, 1949	DVD: Golden Collection: Vol. 4
The Supreme Cat attempts to catch a swallow for a meal.
571	28	Bye, Bye Bluebeard	MM	Arthur Davis	Sid Marcus	Basil Davidovich, Bill Melendez, Don Williams & Emery Hawkins	Porky Pig	October 22, 1949	DVD: Golden Collection: Vol. 3 Blu-Ray: Collector's Vault: Vol. 1
A mouse disguises himself as dangerous serial killer "Bluebeard" to exploit Porky Pig for food, but it doesn't take long for Porky to realize his charade and tries to get him out of his house. But when Porky finds the real Bluebeard, the mouse has to decide whether or not to save him.
572	29	For Scent-imental Reasons	LT	Chuck Jones	Michael Maltese	Ben Washam, Lloyd Vaughan, Ken Harris & Phil Monroe	Pepé Le Pew; Penelope Pussycat	November 12, 1949	DVD: Golden Collection: Vol. 1 DVD: Warner Bros. Home Entertainment Academy Awards Animation Collection; Blu-Ray/DVD: Platinum Collection: Vol. 1 DVD: Super Stars' Pepé Le Pew
A Parisian perfume shop owner finds Pepé Le Pew the skunk sampling his fragrances and throws Penelope Pussycat (in her debut) into the store to chase him out. When Penelope gets a white stripe on her back and tail from a spilled bottle of hair dye, she is mistaken by Pepé as a female skunk. Note: Won the Academy Award for Best Animated Short Film in 1950.
573	30	Hippety Hopper	MM	Robert McKimson	Warren Foster	Pete Burness, John Carey, Charles McKimson & Phil DeLara	Hippety Hopper; Sylvester; The Talking Bulldog	November 19, 1949	DVD: Golden Collection: Vol. 6 (extra, unrestored); DVD: Super Stars' Sylvester & Hippety Hopper (restored)
After Hippety Hopper saves a discouraged mouse from suicide at the waterfront, the mouse promises that the kangaroo would be freed from his cage if he helps the mouse terrorize Sylvester, the cause of his suffering.
574	31	Which Is Witch	LT	Friz Freleng	Tedd Pierce	Ken Champin, Virgil Ross, Arthur Davis & Gerry Chiniquy; A.C. Gamer (effects)	Bugs Bunny	December 3, 1949	N/A
Bugs Bunny runs afoul of Dr. I.C. Spots, the diminutive witch doctor of a nearby tribe who wants to use him in a potion.
575	32	Bear Feat	LT	Chuck Jones	Michael Maltese	Ben Washam, Lloyd Vaughan, Ken Harris & Phil Monroe	The Three Bears	December 10, 1949	DVD: Golden Collection: Vol. 6
Henry Bear, determined to turn his family into a circus act, subjects Mama Bear and Junyer Bear to a series of mishaps in their backyard.
576	33	Rabbit Hood	MM	Chuck Jones	Michael Maltese	Ken Harris, Phil Monroe, Ben Washam & Lloyd Vaughan	Bugs Bunny	December 24, 1949	DVD: Golden Collection: Vol. 4 Blu-Ray/DVD: Platinum Collection: Vol. 1
Bugs Bunny encounters the Sheriff of Nottingham while attempting to pilfer some carrots in the Royal Garden.
577	34	A Ham in a Role	LT	Robert McKimson	Sid Marcus	Charles McKimson, Phil DeLara, Bill Melendez & Emery Hawkins	Goofy Gophers	December 31, 1949	DVD: Golden Collection: Vol. 6 Blu-Ray/DVD: Platinum Collection: Vol. 3
A dog who is tired of appearing in cartoons and wants to perform Shakespearean roles notices that the Goofy Gophers have invaded his home.
