= Sniffles and the Bookworm =

1939 film by Charles Jones

- Directed by: Charles Jones
- Story by: Rich Hogan
- Produced by: Leon Schlesinger
- Starring: Mel Blanc; Margaret Hill-Talbot; William Days; Johnnie Davis; Paul Taylor Mixed Chorus
- Music by: Carl W. Stalling
- Animation by: Bob McKimson
- Color process: Technicolor
- Production company: Leon Schlesinger Productions
- Distributed by: Warner Bros. Pictures
- Release date: November 26, 1939; (earliest known date)
- Running time: 7 min
- Country: United States
- Language: English

Sniffles and the Bookworm is a 1939 American animated comedy short film directed by Charles Jones. The short was released as early as November 26, 1939. It is part of the Merrie Melodies series and the third cartoon to feature Sniffles. It was re-released as a "Blue Ribbon" reissue in 1951, rendering the original film and credits lost.

== Plot ==
On a snowy night, Sniffles rests in a bookshop for warmth and comfort. A bookworm bites his way through a book and drops his glasses, briefly mistaking Sniffles' tail for it. He notices Sniffles and is scared into seeking help from the Pied Piper of Hamelin from a book, who also seeks help from a Viking from another book. They try to sneak up on Sniffles, who emerges from hiding and tails them. Both the Pied Piper and the Viking realize that the bookworm is exaggerating and are relieved to discover the truth.

The Pied Piper gives Sniffles a clarinet as they both play a swing musical number, which cause book characters such as Mother Goose to emerge and join suit. The bookworm is given a trumpet to join in. Frankenstein's monster emerges and chases them, but Sniffles distracts him and trips him off the bookshelf in an act of courage. The bookworm kisses Sniffles while he sleeps as thanks for saving him.

== Home media ==
The short is included on Disc I of Looney Tunes Mouse Chronicles: The Chuck Jones Collection.
