= The Egg Collector =

1940 film by Charles Jones

- Directed by: Charles Jones
- Story by: Bob Givens
- Produced by: Leon Schlesinger
- Starring: Margaret Hill-Talbot; Mel Blanc
- Music by: Carl W. Stalling
- Animation by: Rudy Larriva
- Color process: Technicolor
- Production company: Leon Schlesinger Productions
- Distributed by: Warner Bros. Pictures
- Release date: July 20, 1940
- Running time: 8 min
- Country: United States
- Language: English

The Egg Collector is a 1940 American animated comedy short film directed by Charles Jones. The short was released on July 20, 1940. It is part of the Merrie Melodies series and the fourth cartoon to feature Sniffles. It was re-released as a "Blue Ribbon" reissue in 1949, rendering the original film and credits lost.

== Plot ==
Late one night in a bookstore, Sniffles the mouse is reading the book Egg Collecting For Amateurs. According to the book, a good specimen for beginners is the egg of a great barn owl (previously seen in Little Brother Rat). Sniffles' friend, a bookworm, takes him to the top of an old church tower where they find an owl egg. Sniffles snatches the egg from its cradle, but the father owl stops them before they can escape. Sniffles learns from the owl that he is a rodent and that owls eat rodents and worms. The bookworm faints and Sniffles flees madly, taking the worm with him.

== Home media ==
The short is included on Disc I of Looney Tunes Mouse Chronicles: The Chuck Jones Collection.
