= The Unbearable Bear =

1943 film by Charles M. Jones

- Original title card
- Directed by: Charles M. Jones
- Story by: Michael Maltese
- Produced by: Leon Schlesinger
- Music by: Carl W. Stalling
- Animation by: Robert Cannon
- Color process: Technicolor
- Production company: Leon Schlesinger Productions
- Distributed by: Warner Bros. Pictures
- Release date: April 17, 1943
- Running time: 7 min
- Country: United States
- Language: English

The Unbearable Bear is a 1943 American animated comedy short film directed by Charles M. Jones. The short was originally released on April 17, 1943. It is part of the Merrie Melodies series and the ninth cartoon to feature Sniffles, who was reworked into an obnoxious motormouth after the release of The Brave Little Bat (1941). It was re-released as a "Blue Ribbon" reissue in 1950, rendering the original film lost, though Michael Maltese kept the title and credits cels.

== Plot ==
A fox thief decides to rob the house of a policeman bear, where his wife is waiting to beat him up for coming home late and drunk while muttering in her sleep. He is continuously interrupted by Sniffles who happens to invade the bears' house and never stops speaking. The fox convinces Sniffles that he is Robin Hood, which inadvertently leads to him making more noise by hitting a metal platter and turning on a radio.

The policeman bear returns home late and drunk, but is sober enough to spot the fox. His wife sleepwalks to beat him up, scaring them enough to silence Sniffles. The fox is washed like clothes and hanged by the wife. The bear almost hits his wife with an axe when aiming for the fox, but is launched by Sniffles' bow and arrow. After some chases, he hits his wife with an umbrella, not knowing the fox is on it. The fox lies unconscious on the bear's wife, who is unaware of the situation yet is furious until she mistakes the fox for a fox fur. Realizing he has successfully avoided a beating from his wife, he takes advantage of the situation by paralyzing the fox and silencing Sniffles with his hat.

== Home media ==
The short is included on Disc I of Looney Tunes Mouse Chronicles: The Chuck Jones Collection.
