= Naughty but Mice =

1939 film by Charles Jones

- Title card
- Directed by: Charles Jones
- Story by: Rich Hogan
- Produced by: Leon Schlesinger
- Starring: Margaret Hill-Talbot; Mel Blanc
- Music by: Carl W. Stalling
- Animation by: Phil Monroe
- Color process: Technicolor
- Production company: Leon Schlesinger Productions
- Distributed by: Warner Bros. Pictures
- Release date: May 20, 1939
- Running time: 8 min
- Country: United States
- Language: English

Naughty but Mice is a 1939 American animated comedy short film directed by Charles Jones. The short was released on May 20, 1939. It is part of the Merrie Melodies series and the first cartoon to star Sniffles, a fixture in Jones' early work.

== Plot ==
Sniffles walks down a street to a drug store, showing obvious symptoms of the common cold. He enters through the letter box in the door and locates the cold and flu remedies. He finds a bottle that claims to be a cold remedy; small writing at the bottom of the label indicates "Alcohol 125% proof", which he misses as he only reads the top of the label. He opens the bottle, pours some of the mixture into a spoon and drinks it. Getting tipsy, Sniffles makes his way along the shelf and bumps into a box containing an electric razor. The razor comes out of its box and greets Sniffles using a buzzing noise. Sniffles advises the razor of his cold, before sneezing on him. Moments later, the razor also begins to show symptoms of the common cold.

Sniffles promises the razor to get a cold remedy. After telling the razor several times not to move anywhere he leaves and comes back with the spoon filled with the same cold remedy he took. Now both Sniffles and the razor are drunk and partake in a rendition of "How Dry I Am". The razor then seems to get tired and Sniffles walks away. A heretofore hidden black cat follows him.

Sniffles walks off the edge of a shelf and falls into a claw vending machine. The cat finds coins in a pocket (or at least somewhere in its fur) and tries to grab Sniffles. Eventually he succeeds and Sniffles, who had been oblivious to the existence of the cat, begins to get very scared. The razor wakes up and attacks the cat, shaving off the cat's fur. The cat runs away. Sniffles thanks the razor, sneezes again and is blown backwards, into the claw of the vending machine. Sniffles smiles, hanging from the claw by his trousers.

== Home media ==
The short is included on Disc I of Looney Tunes Mouse Chronicles: The Chuck Jones Collection.

== Bibliography ==
- Sandler, Kevin S. Reading the rabbit: explorations in Warner Bros. animation, Rutgers University Press, 1998, ISBN 978-0-8135-2538-9
- Grant, John Masters of animation, Watson-Guptill Publications, 2001, ISBN 978-0-8230-3041-5
