= Little Blabbermouse =

1940 film by Isadore Freleng

- Directed by: Isadore Freleng
- Story by: Ben Hardaway
- Produced by: Leon Schlesinger
- Starring: Mel Blanc
- Music by: Carl W. Stalling
- Animation by: Richard Bickenbach
- Color process: Technicolor
- Production company: Leon Schlesinger Productions
- Distributed by: Warner Bros. Pictures
- Release date: July 6, 1940
- Running time: 8 min
- Country: United States
- Language: English

Little Blabbermouse is a 1940 American animated comedy short film directed by Isadore Freleng. It was released on July 6, 1940. It is part of the Merrie Melodies series. It is the first appearance of Blabbermouse, who was retired and had his character traits transferred to Sniffles after Shop Look & Listen (1940). It was re-released as a "Blue Ribbon" reissue in 1948, rendering the original film and credits lost.

== Plot ==
A mouse resembling W. C. Fields attempts to monetize the pharmacy he is in by starting a skyride of the store for other mice. He is constantly annoyed by Blabbermouse. The mouse begrudgingly allows Blabbermouse to ride after he pays the fee and abruptly falls through the cracks. Blabbermouse manages to be silent for most of the trip.

The mouse introduces a number of miraculous ailments such as literal vanishing cream, reducing pills which shrink the bottle, sleeping powder which sleep soundly, smelling salts which smell shoe trees and coughing syrup which coughs. He introduces a literal giant malt, a little squirt, a literal shaving brush and insane "krazy water" (a parody of Crazy Water, a brand of mineral water from Texas), which intrigues Blabbermouse to the W. C. Fields mouse's annoyance.

A literal rubber band (a running gag in Freleng's cartoons) and military brushes perform music and march. Objects such as clocks, an order book, coins, pink pills, tobacco then sing a variety of songs. The W. C. Fields mouse is unaware that a cat has scared away the other mice, with Blabbermouse being concerned about his ignorance. As they make a successful getaway, Blabbermouse requests a refund, which the W. C. Fields mouse reacts by slamming alum into his lips to silence him.

== Home media ==
This short was first released as an extra on Looney Tunes Mouse Chronicles: The Chuck Jones Collection. It was later released in a higher quality restoration on Looney Tunes Collector's Vault: Volume 2.
