= Looney Tunes Mouse Chronicles: The Chuck Jones Collection =

- DVD cover
- Directed by: Chuck Jones
- Distributed by: Warner Home Video
- Release date: August 28, 2012
- Country: United States
- Language: English

Looney Tunes Mouse Chronicles: The Chuck Jones Collection is a DVD and Blu-ray set featuring cartoons focusing on Hubie and Bertie and Sniffles and featuring various other mouse characters in Merrie Melodies and Looney Tunes shorts. It was released on August 28, 2012.

== Disc 1 ==
All cartoons on this disc star Sniffles and are directed by Chuck Jones.

#	Title	Co-Stars	Year	Series
1	Naughty but Mice		1939	MM
2	Little Brother Rat		1939	MM
3	Sniffles and the Bookworm	Bookworm	1939	MM
4	Sniffles Takes a Trip		1940	MM
5	The Egg Collector	Bookworm	1940	MM
6	Bedtime for Sniffles		1940	MM
7	Sniffles Bells the Cat		1941	MM
8	Toy Trouble	Bookworm	1941	MM
9	The Brave Little Bat		1941	MM
10	The Unbearable Bear		1943	MM
11	Lost and Foundling		1944	MM
12	Hush My Mouse		1946	LT

=== Special feature ===
- Naughty but Mice commentary by Jerry Beck

== Disc 2 ==
All cartoons on this disc star Hubie and Bertie and are directed by Chuck Jones.

#	Title	Co-Stars	Year	Series
1	The Aristo-Cat	Claude, Hector	1943	MM
2	Trap Happy Porky	Porky, Claude, Hector	1945	LT
3	Roughly Squeaking	Claude, Hector	1946	LT
4	House Hunting Mice		1947	LT
5	Mouse Wreckers	Claude, Hector	1949	LT
6	The Hypo-Chondri-Cat	Claude	1950	MM
7	Cheese Chasers	Claude, Marc Antony	1951	MM

=== Special features ===
- Bonus documentary: "Of Mice and Pen"
- Audio commentaries
  - The Aristo-Cat commentary by Eddie Fitzgerald
  - The Aristo-Cat commentary by Greg Ford with Chuck Jones
  - Mouse Wreckers commentary by Greg Ford
  - The Hypo-Chondri-Cat commentary by Jerry Beck
- The Hypo-Chondri-Cat storyboard reel
- 11 bonus cartoons (unremastered/restored):

#	Title	Characters	Director	Year	Series
1	The Country Mouse		Friz Freleng	1935	MM
2	The Lyin' Mouse		Friz Freleng	1937	MM
3	The Mice Will Play		Tex Avery	1938	MM
4	Little Blabbermouse	Little Blabbermouse	Friz Freleng	1940	MM
5	Shop, Look, and Listen	Little Blabbermouse	Friz Freleng	1940	MM
6	Mouse Mazurka	Sylvester	Friz Freleng	1949	MM
7	Mouse-Warming	Claude, Hector	Chuck Jones	1952	LT
8	Mouse-Taken Identity	Hippety Hopper, Sylvester, Sylvester Jr.	Robert McKimson	1957	MM
9	Mice Follies	The Honey-Mousers	Robert McKimson	1960	LT
10	It's Nice to Have a Mouse Around the House	Daffy, Granny, Speedy, Sylvester	Friz Freleng	1965	LT
11	Merlin the Magic Mouse	Merlin, Second Banana, Sam Cat	Alex Lovy	1967	MM
