= Shop Look & Listen =

1940 film by Isadore Freleng

- Title card
- Directed by: Isadore Freleng
- Story by: Dave Monahan
- Produced by: Leon Schlesinger
- Starring: Mel Blanc
- Music by: Carl W. Stalling
- Animation by: Cal Dalton
- Color process: Technicolor
- Production company: Leon Schlesinger Productions
- Distributed by: Warner Bros. Pictures
- Release date: December 21, 1940
- Running time: 8 min
- Country: United States
- Language: English

Shop Look & Listen is a 1940 American animated comedy short film directed by Isadore Freleng. It was released on December 21, 1940. It is part of the Merrie Melodies series. It is the second and final appearance of Blabbermouse, who debuted in Little Blabbermouse (1940), but was retired and had his character traits transferred to Sniffles.

== Plot ==
A mouse resembling W. C. Fields attempts to monetize the J. T. Gimlet department store by starting a skyride of the store for other mice. He introduces various humorous products and works of art in roughly the same routine as its predecessor. Little Blabbermouse annoys him again and is silenced by being wrapped into a gift.
