= Sniffles Bells the Cat =

1941 film by Charles M. Jones

- Directed by: Charles M. Jones
- Story by: Rich Hogan
- Produced by: Leon Schlesinger
- Starring: Mel Blanc
- Music by: Carl W. Stalling
- Animation by: Ken Harris
- Color process: Technicolor
- Production company: Leon Schlesinger Productions
- Distributed by: Warner Bros. Pictures
- Release date: February 1, 1941
- Running time: 8 min
- Country: United States
- Language: English

Sniffles Bells the Cat is a 1941 American animated comedy short film directed by Charles M. Jones. It was released on February 1, 1941. It is part of the Merrie Melodies series and the sixth cartoon to feature Sniffles. It was re-released as a "Blue Ribbon" reissue in 1947, rendering the original film and credits lost.

== Plot ==
Sniffles and his friends are pursued by a cat and barely escape unscathed. Sniffles suggests belling the cat as a precaution to be alerted of its presence. Noticing a spare bell, the other mice egg him on to bell the cat himself for having suggested it, much to his horror, as he is thrown out against his will. He falls asleep and waits until night.

At night, he strategizes while the cat eavesdrops on him. He escapes but accidentally runs on the cat's face. He escapes into the kitchen again. He hides amongst three cups, which the cat is unable to find as it searches the second cup. Realizing his mistake, the cat pursues Sniffles who escapes in the cup, but accidentally bells himself. The cat plays with the bell while Sniffles, not realizing he had done his job, returns home much to the other mice's amazement.

== Home media ==
The short is included on Disc I of Looney Tunes Mouse Chronicles: The Chuck Jones Collection.
