= Bedtime for Sniffles =

1940 film by Charles Jones

- Directed by: Charles Jones
- Story by: Rich Hogan
- Produced by: Leon Schlesinger
- Starring: Mel Blanc
- Music by: Carl W. Stalling
- Animation by: Robert Cannon
- Color process: Technicolor
- Production company: Leon Schlesinger Productions
- Distributed by: Warner Bros. Pictures
- Release date: November 23, 1940
- Running time: 8 min
- Country: United States
- Language: English

Bedtime for Sniffles is a 1940 American animated comedy short film directed by Charles Jones. It was released on November 23, 1940. It is part of the Merrie Melodies series and the fifth cartoon to feature Sniffles. It was re-released as a "Blue Ribbon" reissue in 1949, rendering the original film and credits lost.

== Plot ==
On Christmas Eve, Sniffles looks forward to meeting Santa Claus on Christmas. He wastes his energy trying to look good for the occasion. He hallucinates measles as he becomes sleepier. He makes coffee but still struggles to stay awake, resisting his attempts to sleep by trying not to look at his bed in various ways. A hallucination of himself goads him to sleep. Unfortunately, Santa Claus appears right as he sleeps, but he does not stop to meet Sniffles as Sniffles had envisioned.

== Home media ==
The short is included on Disc I of Looney Tunes Mouse Chronicles: The Chuck Jones Collection.
