= Little Brother Rat =

1939 film by Charles Jones

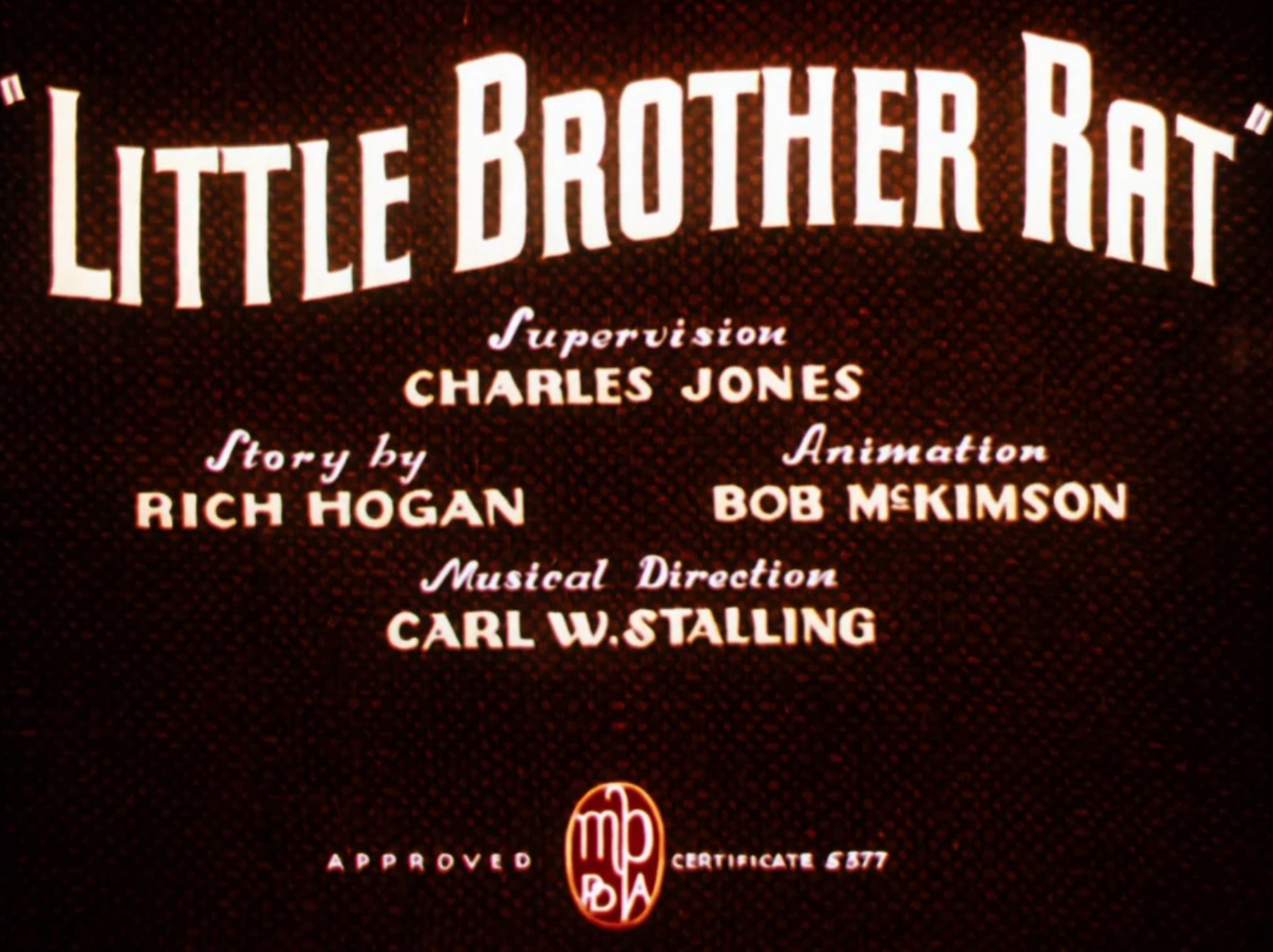
- Title card
- Directed by: Charles Jones
- Story by: Rich Hogan
- Produced by: Leon Schlesinger
- Starring: Mel Blanc
- Music by: Carl W. Stalling
- Animation by: Bob McKimson
- Color process: Technicolor
- Production company: Leon Schlesinger Productions
- Distributed by: Warner Bros. Pictures
- Release date: August 26, 1939
- Running time: 7 min
- Country: United States
- Language: English

Little Brother Rat is a 1939 American animated comedy short film directed by Charles Jones. The short was released on August 26, 1939. It is part of the Merrie Melodies series and the second cartoon to feature Sniffles. It was re-released as a "Blue Ribbon" reissue in 1946.

== Plot ==
A group of mice party and partake in a scavenger hunt, including Sniffles, who is the first to find a cat's whisker by violently plucking it off a cat. He only needs to acquire an owl's egg to achieve victory. He narrowly avoids the cat's attack and finds an owl egg next to a sleeping owl in a barn. He takes it, but the owl teleports to block him. The owl is angered by the act and kicks Sniffles out, but he bounces on the cat and manages to return.

Sniffles manages to actually steal the egg, but he cracks it after tripping over a nail, revealing a baby owl. The baby owl evades capture by teleporting out of the zip-tied egg and winning a fight against Sniffles. Unwilling to risk the wrath of the owl's parent, he leaves the barn, only to find the baby owl, who had recognized Sniffles as his parent, behind him. The cat chases the baby owl and Sniffles, only for the parent owl to grab the cat in its paws and send it tumbling into a chimney. The owl gives Sniffles the egg as gratitude for saving his child, only for a baby owl to emerge from the egg once again.

== Home media ==
The short is included on Disc I of Looney Tunes Mouse Chronicles: The Chuck Jones Collection.
