= Toy Trouble =

1941 film by Charles M. Jones

- Directed by: Charles M. Jones
- Story by: Rich Hogan
- Produced by: Leon Schlesinger
- Starring: Mel Blanc
- Music by: Carl W. Stalling
- Animation by: Robert Cannon
- Color process: Technicolor
- Production company: Leon Schlesinger Productions
- Distributed by: Warner Bros. Pictures
- Release date: April 12, 1941
- Running time: 7 min
- Country: United States
- Language: English

Toy Trouble is a 1941 American animated comedy short film directed by Charles M. Jones. It was released on April 12, 1941. It is part of the Merrie Melodies series and the seventh cartoon to feature Sniffles. It was re-released as a "Blue Ribbon" reissue in 1949, rendering the original film and credits lost.

== Plot ==
Sniffles and the bookworm, who have become better friends over the last few cartoons, visit the toy store at the department store Lacy's, a parody of Macy's, at midnight. Sniffles instructs the bookworm not to touch any toys after he activated a toy band in blackface, which play music to his amusement.

The bookworm proceeds to accidentally activate a toy goose, who becomes a nuisance and harasses Sniffles after the bookworm is sent flying into a jack-in-the-box. A toy train is accidentally activated and chases the bookworm. Sniffles plays with a mini high striker.

Sniffles finds stuffed toys, letting down his guard as he believes a disguised cat to be a stuffed toy. He realizes once the cat gives chase, disguising himself as a toy amongst a row of Porky Pig toys. The cat is too stupid to realize even when Sniffles moves and messes up the sound emitted by the toys, until the bookworm runs on top of the cat. As he is notified of the cat, the bookworm is stuffed into a test tube. The toy goose returns and scares the cat into activating the toys from earlier and smashing into blocks before escaping from the elevator. Sniffles is pleased while the bookworm's head is still jammed in the test tube.

== Home media ==
The short is included on Disc I of Looney Tunes Mouse Chronicles: The Chuck Jones Collection.
