= Sniffles Takes a Trip =

1940 film by Charles Jones

- Blue Ribbon reissue title card
- Directed by: Charles Jones
- Story by: Dave Monahan
- Produced by: Leon Schlesinger
- Starring: Margaret Hill-Talbot (uncredited)
- Music by: Carl W. Stalling
- Animation by: Philip Monroe
- Color process: Technicolor
- Production company: Leon Schlesinger Productions
- Distributed by: Warner Bros. Pictures
- Release date: May 11, 1940
- Running time: 8 min
- Country: United States
- Language: English

Sniffles Takes a Trip is a 1940 American animated comedy short film directed by Charles Jones. The short was released on May 11, 1940. It is part of the Merrie Melodies series and the third cartoon to feature Sniffles. It was re-released as a "Blue Ribbon" reissue in 1953, rendering the original film and credits lost.

== Plot ==
Sniffles joyfully walks across train tracks in order to find peace and quiet in the countryside, away from the city. He walks into Country Meadows, which promises the peace and quiet he had sought. He excitedly settles down and uses his binoculars to spot the fauna and flora, only to find a particularly furious fly in front of him.

Sniffles sets up a hammock and prepares to sleep. A woodpecker pecks one of the trees the hammock is hanged on, causing him to be shaken uncomfortably. He then accidentally hangs the hammock on a stork's legs. The stork is annoyed and attempts to drown Sniffles by walking into water. Sniffles realizes he is underwater and climbs on the stork, only to be scared by its stare. He falls into the water and confuses a frog for an alligator.

At night, Sniffles starts a fire, only to be startled by the silhouettes of birds, insects. and trees. He finally realizes that he had it better in the city and quickly returns to its comfort.

== Home media ==
- LaserDisc - The Golden Age of Looney Tunes: Volume 1, Side 5 - Chuck Jones
- DVD - Looney Tunes Golden Collection: Volume 6, Disc 1 - Bonus Feature (USA 1995 Turner print)
- Blu-Ray/DVD - Looney Tunes Mouse Chronicles: The Chuck Jones Collection, Disc 1 (restored)
- Streaming - HBO Max
- Streaming - Tubi
