= The Brave Little Bat =

1941 film by Charles M. Jones

- Directed by: Charles M. Jones
- Story by: Rich Hogan
- Produced by: Leon Schlesinger
- Starring: Mel Blanc
- Music by: Carl W. Stalling
- Animation by: Rudy Larriva
- Color process: Technicolor
- Production company: Leon Schlesinger Productions
- Distributed by: Warner Bros. Pictures
- Release date: September 27, 1941
- Running time: 7 min
- Country: United States
- Language: English

The Brave Little Bat is a 1941 American animated comedy short film directed by Charles M. Jones. It was released on September 27, 1941. It is part of the Merrie Melodies series, the eighth cartoon to feature Sniffles and the final cartoon before Sniffles was reworked into an obnoxious motormouth similar to the titular bat. It was re-released as a "Blue Ribbon" reissue in 1952, rendering the original film and credits lost.

== Plot ==
Sniffles drives a wind-up toy car which breaks down in the middle of the road. As a rainstorm starts, he hides in the nearest cover, an abandoned windmill. Sniffles lights a lamp and sleeps on some hay, only to be met with Batty, a chatty bat who looks like him. Batty is amused by Sniffles' similarity in appearance and his name, but saves him from a nearby cat. He lands Sniffles on a high ledge, not realizing that Sniffles is afraid of heights because he cannot fly. Batty flies away upon realizing he walked on the cat. He returns to save Sniffles from being eaten on a plank. The cat falls to his doom, trapped in a bottle while grievously injured. Batty remarks how the cat is willing to reach such heights in the first place.

== Home media ==
The short is included on Disc I of Looney Tunes Mouse Chronicles: The Chuck Jones Collection.
