= Sniffles (Merrie Melodies) =

Warner Bros. theatrical cartoon character

- Merrie Melodies/Looney Tunes character
- Sniffles the mouse, in his debut short, Naughty but Mice.
- First appearance: Naughty but Mice (1939)
- Created by: Chuck Jones
- Designed by: Charles Thorson
- Voiced by: Margaret Hill-Talbot (1939–1941); Marjorie Talton (1943–1946); Colleen Wainwright (1996); Kath Soucie (2002–2020); Dawson Griffin (2022–present)

In-universe information
- Species: Mouse
- Gender: Male

Sniffles is an animated cartoon character created by Chuck Jones for the Merrie Melodies and Looney Tunes series of cartoons and comics.

== Appearance ==
The character wears a blue sailor cap, a red shirt, blue pants, a yellow scarf, white gloves and tan shoes. His fur is brown with light markings on the face.

== History ==
Jones created the character as a potential new star for the series; he debuted in the short Naughty but Mice (1939). Jones went on to direct 12 cartoons featuring Sniffles, most of which showcase the naïveté of Sniffles by placing him in a dangerous world. Sniffles was highly popular with children, but Jones grew to dislike the character's films. By 1943, Jones transformed Sniffles into an incessant chatterbox who serves more as a nuisance than a cute protagonist. For example, in The Unbearable Bear (1943), Sniffles foils a robbery attempt by perpetually pestering the perpetrator. These traits were originally part of Little Blabbermouse, another Merrie Melodies character that appeared in two shorts, directed by Friz Freleng (Little Blabbermouse (1940) and Shop, Look, and Listen (1940)) before being retired. Jones was moving out of his Disney-esque stage in the late 1940s, and Sniffles was retired in 1946 as the director took to more aggressive characters such as the Three Bears, fellow mice Hubie and Bertie, Marvin the Martian, and Wile E. Coyote and Road Runner. The mouse's final cartoon was Hush My Mouse (his only entry in the Looney Tunes series) in 1946.

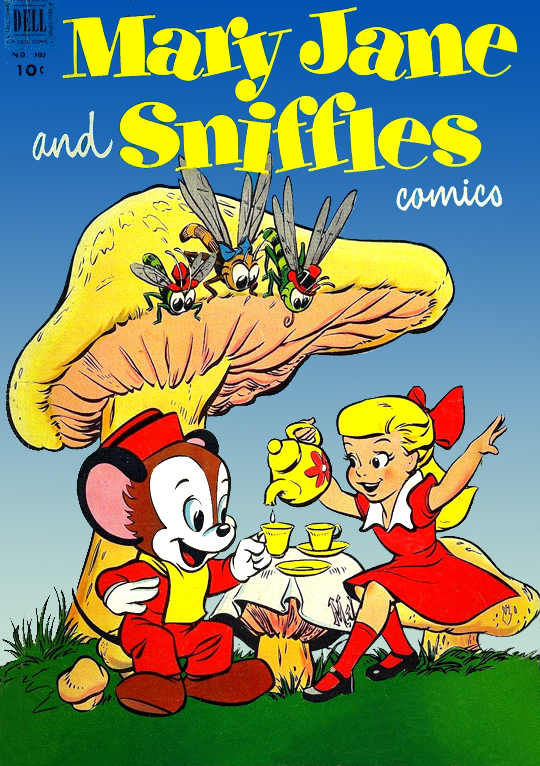
Mary Jane and Sniffles, Dell Comics, 1952.

Sniffles faded into obscurity in the animation arena. However, he would find new life in the Looney Tunes and Merrie Melodies Comics begun in 1940 by Dell Comics (writer Chase Craig used several minor Warner Bros. characters to fill pages). These comics teamed Sniffles with a little girl named Mary Jane who could shrink herself to mouse size, originally by sprinkling magic sand borrowed from the Sandman. Throughout most of the series, she could shrink just by reciting "First I close my eyes real tight / Then I wish with all my might / Magic words of poof poof piffles / Make me just as small as Sniffles." By now Sniffles had lost most of his animated film personality and was just a companion to Mary Jane as she explored something found in a garden or entered a sort of magical toyland. Mary Jane surpassed the mouse in popularity, and got top billing in later issues. Artist Roger Armstrong drew the series until Al Hubbard took over in the 1950s. These adventures proved a favorite with readers, and the series continued until 1961. This series was resurrected in 2006 for a story in issue #140 of the Looney Tunes comic book published by DC Comics.

With the exception of Naughty but Mice, every cartoon in the Sniffles series was given a Blue Ribbon reissue. All 12 Sniffles cartoons were included on that Looney Tunes Mouse Chronicles: The Chuck Jones Collection DVD and Blu-ray set.

The 1990 television series Tiny Toon Adventures features a younger counterpart to Sniffles named Li'l Sneezer, a baby mouse with a propensity for having hurricane-force sneezes.

Sniffles has a cameo in the movie Space Jam, voiced by Colleen Wainwright. He plays for the Looney Tunes team and is squashed flat by one of the Monstars after he chats very quickly and very annoyingly to one of them.

He appears in The Sylvester & Tweety Mysteries, voiced by Kath Soucie. In the episode "The Tail End", he is depicted as a scientifically created Manx mouse with no tail, and unlike his other appearances in this episode, he does not wear any clothes except for a cap.

Sniffles appears in the The Looney Tunes Show opening.

Sniffles appears in the New Looney Tunes segments "DarkBat", "Bonjour, DarkBat" and "Smoothie Operator", voiced again by Kath Soucie. He has a superhero alter-ego called DarkBat (voiced by Daran Norris) who is a parody of Batman.

Sniffles made a cameo appearance in the Looney Tunes Cartoons short "Happy Birthday Bugs Bunny!".

Sniffles appears in Bugs Bunny Builders, where he is voiced by Dawson Griffin.

== Filmography ==
- Naughty but Mice (1939)
- Little Brother Rat (1939)
- Sniffles and the Bookworm (1939)
- Sniffles Takes a Trip (1940)
- The Egg Collector (1940)
- Bedtime for Sniffles (1940)
- Sniffles Bells the Cat (1941)
- Toy Trouble (1941)
- The Brave Little Bat (1941)
- The Unbearable Bear (1943)
- Lost and Foundling (1944)
- Hush My Mouse (1946)
