= Piotr Adamczyk =

Polish actor

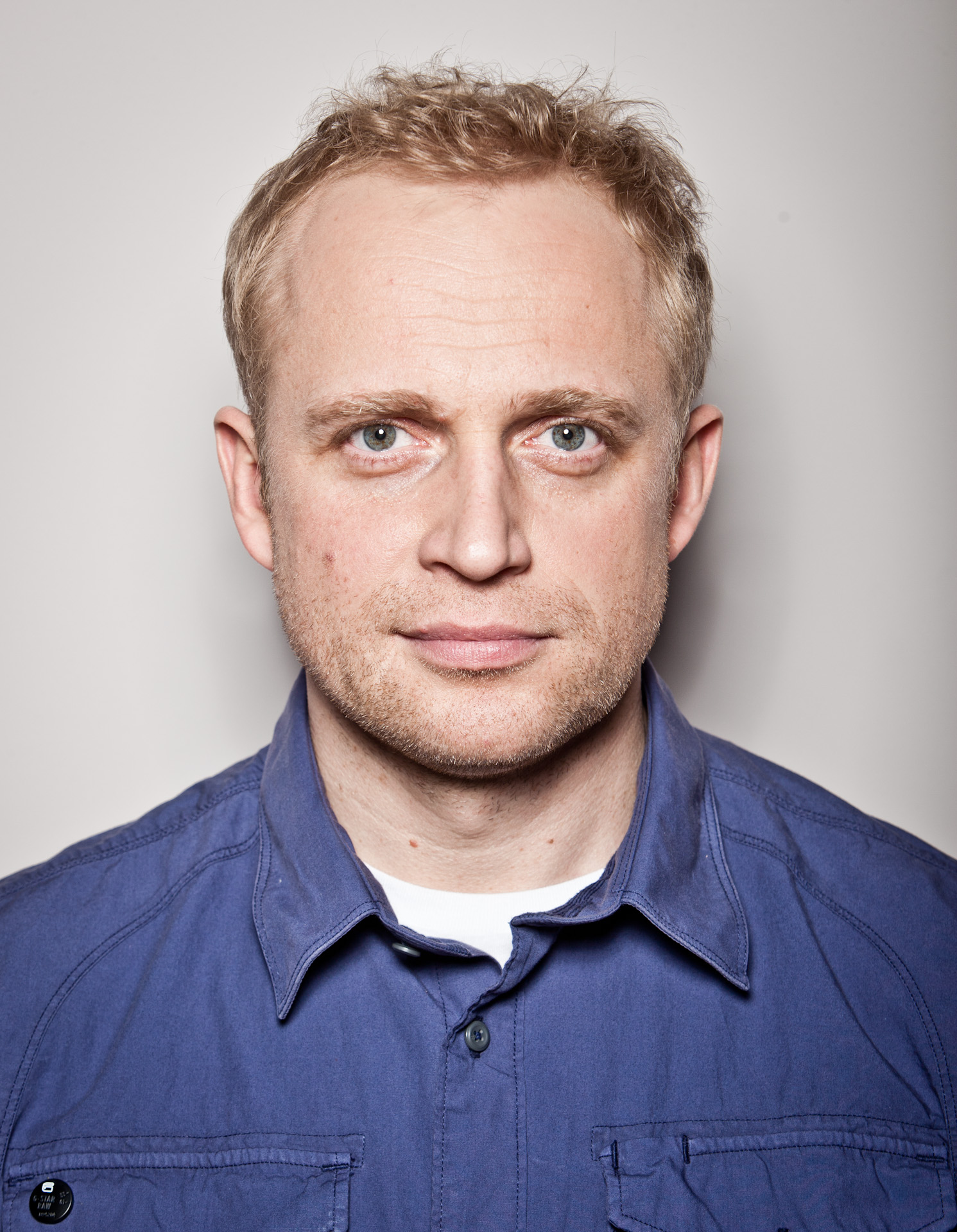
- Adamczyk in 2012
- Born: Piotr Aleksander Adamczyk; March 21, 1972 (age 54); Warsaw, Poland
- Education: National Academy of Dramatic Art in Warsaw
- Occupations: film actor, stage actor
- Years active: 1991–present
- Spouse: Karolina Szymczak

Piotr Aleksander Adamczyk (Polish: [ˈpjɔtr aˈdamt͡ʂɨk]; born March 21, 1972) is a Polish film, television, voice and theatre actor. He is known for portraying pianist and composer Frédéric Chopin in the biographical film Chopin: Desire for Love (2002), Pope John Paul II in the TV miniseries Karol: A Man Who Became Pope (2005) and its sequel Karol: The Pope, The Man (2006), Tomas in the Marvel Cinematic Universe Disney+ series Hawkeye (2021) and Sergei Nikulov in the Apple TV+ original science fiction space drama series For All Mankind (2021–2024).

== Early life and education ==
From his early childhood Adamczyk wanted to become an actor. He attended the Machulski youth theatre group in Warsaw. Thanks to an international scholarship, he was able to attend international theatre workshops in the United Kingdom and Germany. He continued his acting education by attending the Theatre Academy in Warsaw. During his second academic year, he won a scholarship from the Soros Foundation which allowed him to attend the British American Drama Academy for one year, where he performed Hamlet for his diploma.

== Career ==
Once he graduated from the Theatre Academy, Adamczyk was hired by the Teatr Współczesny in Warsaw. His career in the film industry however grew much more intensively. He played Stawrogin in Fyodor Dostoyevsky’s The Possessed. The breakthrough in his career was his part as Frédéric Chopin in the film Chopin: Desire for Love - and became a Polish star.

The climax of his popularity was reached when he played the title role of another Polish historical figure in a two part Italian TV movie - Karol: A Man Who Became Pope and Karol: The Pope, The Man. The movie was viewed by several dozen million viewers, and made him popular in Italy, Latin America and many other Catholic countries.

Adamczyk also managed to take advantage of his popularity abroad to act at the Sala Uno Theatre in Rome, in Italian. He also appeared in Liliana Cavani’s movie Einstein and in the Portuguese production Second Life.

In 2014, Adamczyk, Bartosz Opania and Paweł Domagała starred in the comedy film Wkreceni.

He has been in over 800 radio roles and around 100 theatre, television and film parts. He is also appreciated for his roles in Polish dubbing. In animated films he voiced, among others, Melman the giraffe in Madagascar, Lightning McQueen in Cars, and Syndrome in The Incredibles.

He has received many prestigious awards in Poland. In 2011, he was voted the most popular Polish actor.

== Filmography ==
=== Films ===
Year	Title	Role	Notes
1991	30 Door Key	Student	Feature film; uncredited
1995	At Full Gallop	Ksawery	Feature film
1995	Żółta szlafmyca albo kolęda na Nowy Rok	Sieciech	Television play
1995	Uczeń diabła	Krzyś	Television play
1995	Abigel	Feri	Television play
1996	Małka Szwarcenkopf	Jojne Firułkes	Television play
1996	Mutanci	Julka	Television play
1996	Kobieta bez skazy	Edward Kaswin	Television play
1996	Filomena Marturano	Umberto	Television play
1996	Sprawa Stawrogina	Mikołaj Stawrogin	Television play
1996	Skarb w płomieniach	Feliks	Television play
1997	Bezdroża serca i umysłu	Mr. de Meilcour	Television play
1997	Legenda o świętym Antonim Pustelniku	Antoni	Television play
1997	Ketchup Schroedera	Klimek	Television play
1997	Dziady		Television play
1997	Our God's Brother	Hubert	Feature film
1998	Alek	Zbyszek	Television play
1998	Portret wenecki	Young Gustaw	Television play
1998	Dama od Maxima	Prince	Television play
1999	Dwa teatry	Boy	Television play
1999	Dwa teatry	Director #2	Television play
1999	Tango	Artur	Television play
1999	Niedobra miłość	Justyn	Television play
1999	Gorący oddech pustyni	Secretary	Television play
1999	Egzekutor	Physician	Feature film
1999	The Gateway of Europe	Tadeusz Sztyller	Feature film
1999	Na plebanii w Wyszkowie 1920	Marian Lacheta	Documentary film
2000	Prymas. Trzy lata z tysiąca	Kozyry	Feature film
2000	Juliusz Słowacki tańczy	Narrator	Documentary film
2000	Thomas and the Falcon King	Cedryk	Feature film
2000	Temida jest kobietą, czyli historie zapożyczone od Guy de Maupassanta	Cornoude	Television play
2000	Sandra K.	Director	Television play
2001	Łzy	Bright Lord	Television play
2002	Szkoła obmowy	Karol	Television play
2002	Dożywocie	Rafał	Television play
2002	Chłopiec i anioł	Father	Television play
2002	Rysa	Andrzej	Television play
2002	Chopin: Desire for Love	Frédéric Chopin	Feature film
2002	Wszyscy święci	Prist in Jędrzejów	Feature film
2002	Career of Nikos Dyzma	English language lecturer	Feature film
2003	Ciało	Parson	Feature film
2003	Łowcy skór	Dr. Andrzej Kwiatkowski	Feature film
2003	Po deszczu	IT specialist	Television play
2003	Edward II	Lightborne	Television play
2004	Książę nocy	Stalinist	Television play
2004	Karol: A Man Who Became Pope	Pope John Paul II	Feature film
2005	Karol: The Pope, The Man	Pope John Paul II	Feature film
2005	Papierośnica		Short film
2005	Wniebowstąpienie	Charon	Television play
2005	Małe piwo	Kajtek	Television play
2006	Piotr Adamczyk. Aktor, który...	Himself	Documentary film
2007	Testosterone	Kornel Olendzki	Feature film
2007	Słowo honoru	Józef Rybicki "Maciej"	Television play
2007	Wyzwolenie	Konrad	Television play
2008	Ladies	Artur	Feature film
2008	Nie kłam, kochanie	Marcin Paprocki	Feature film
2008	Limousine	Georges	Feature film; also co-producer
2008	Resolution 819	Aperto Films	Feature film; also co-producer
2008	Einstein	Kurt Kluge	Feature film
2009	Second Life	Nicholas	Feature film; also co-producer
2009	Copernicus's Star	Nicolaus Copernicus	Feature film; voice
2010	Święty interes	Leszek Rembowski	Feature film; also co-producer
2010	Trick	Marek Kowalewski	Feature film
2010	Śniadanie do łóżka	Konrad	Feature film
2010	Nie ten człowiek	Servant	Feature film
2010	Koniec Rosji	—N/a	Feature film; co-producer
2010	Namiętna kobieta	Mark	Television play
2011	Getsemani	Alec Beasley	Television play
2011	Och, Karol 2	Karol Górski	Feature film
2011	Entanglement	Antoni Szacki	Feature film
2011	Letters to Santa	Szczepan Lisiecki	Feature film
2011	L'infiltré	—N/a	Feature film; producer
2012	The Day of the Siege: September Eleven 1683	Emperor Leopold I	Feature film
2012	Hans Kloss: More Than Death at Stake	Hermann Brunner	Feature film
2013	1939 Battle of Westerplatte	Mieczysław Słaby	Feature film
2013	Rzecz o banalności miłości	Younger Martin Heidegger	Television play
2013	Nikt mnie nie zna	Marek Zięba	Television play
2014	Przygoda	Dr Zoltán	Television play
2014	Wkręceni	Franek Szpak	Feature film
2014	Warsaw Uprising	Karol	Voice; Documentary film
2015	Letters to Santa 2	Szczepan Lisiecki	Feature film
2015	Słaba płeć?	Jimmie	Feature film
2016	I'm a Killer	Aleksander Stępski	Feature film
2016	Wrobiony	Dominik	Feature film
2016	Posprzątane	Charles	Television play
2017	Listy z Rosji	Astolphe de Custine	Television play
2017	Biesiada u hrabiny Kotłubaj	Gombrowicz	Television play
2017	The Art of Loving: Story of Michalina Wisłocka	Stanisław Wisłocki	Feature film
2017	Letters to Santa 3	Szczepan Lisiecki	Feature film
2017	Mission Control: The Unsung Heroes Of Apollo	Sergey Lebedev	Feature film
2017	I'm Endless Like the Space	Mark	Feature film
2018	Narzeczony na niby	Darek Szmidt	Feature film
2018	303 Squadron	Witold Urbanowicz	Feature film
2019	Icarus. The Legend of Mietek Kosz	Bogdan Danowicz	Feature film
2019	Women of Mafia 2	Mat	Feature film
2019	Their Lucky Stars	Robert Turski	Feature film
2019	Wesele	Poet	Television play
2020	Mayday	Jan Kowalski	Feature film
2020	Letters to Santa 4	Szczepan Lisiecki	Feature film
2020	Fisheye	Marek	Feature film
2021	Small World	Robert Goc	Feature film
2021	A Woman at Night	Dracula	Feature film
2021	In for a Murder	Robert Mazur	Feature film
2022	Letters to Santa 5	Szczepan Lisiecki	Feature film
2023	Up on the Roof	Stephan	Feature film
2023	Il cacio con le pere	Sergei	Feature film
2023	Falling Stars	Ouami	Feature film
2023	Max & Me	Maximilian Kolbe	Feature film; voice
2023	Max & Me	Franciszek Gajowniczek	Feature film; voice
2024	The Partisan	Captan Hamann	Feature film
2024	Letters to Santa 6	Szczepan Lisiecki	Feature film

=== Television series ===
Year	Title	Role	Notes
1991	Pogranicze w ogniu	Pająk	2 episodes
1995	Spellbinder	Zander	10 episodes
1997	Boża podszewka	Adam Jurewicz	4 episodes
1997	Sława i chwała	Józio Royski	7 episodes
1999	Ja, Malinowski	Pijaszewski	11 episodes
2000	Removals	Lieutenant	2 episodes
2001	Garderoba damska	Paweł Spory	2 episodes
2003	Timewatch		Episode: "Through Hell for Hitler" (no. 36)
2003–2004	Na dobre i na złe	Jerzy Kozerski	26 episodes
2004	Dziupla Cezara	Cezary Kubik	Main role; 13 episodes
2004–2006	Pensjonat pod Różą	Jacek Kakietek	Main role; 97 episodes
2009	39 and a Half	Jacek Wąglik	Episode: "Liceum" (no. 34)
2009	Naznaczony	Tadeusz Kral	Main role; 13 episodes
2009–2014	Days of Honor	Lars Rainer	Main role; 74 episodes
2011–2013	Recipe For Life	Andrzej Zawadzki	Main role; 64 episodes
2012	Trick	Marek Kowalewski	Main role
2012–2014	Piąty Stadion	Borys Nowakowski	Main role
2014	Between the Lines	Fryderyk Rekrut	Main role; 13 episodes
2014	Mister Ignis		Episode no. 1
2014	Polacy w Rzymie i Watykanie		9 episodes
2017	House of Change	Stefan Malinowski	Main role; 8 episodes
2018	Counterpart	Gunther	4 episodes
2018	Third Half	Borys Nowakowski	Main role
2018–2019	Madam Secretary	Józef Demko, President of Poland	2 episodes
2019	The Name of the Rose	Severinus	
2019	Women of Mafia 2	Mat	Main role
2019–2021	Better Half	Borys	23 episodes
2021	Small World	Robert Goc	3 episodes
2020	Mayday	Jan Kowalski	Main role; 4 episodes
2020–2021	Kowalscy kontra Kowalscy	Piotr Kowalski	Main role; 44 episodes
2021–2024	For All Mankind	Sergei Orestovich Nikulov	13 episodes
2021	Hawkeye	Tomas	6 episodes
2022	Night Sky	Cornelius	4 episodes
2024	Go Ahead, Brother	Eryk Tomczyk	5 episodes
2024	Klara	Wojciech	6 episodes
2024	Prosta sprawa	Kazik	6 episodes
2025	Project UFO	Jan Polgar	4 episodes

=== Polish-language dubbing ===
Year	Title	Role	Notes
1995	Teen Wolf	Scott Howard	Television series
1996	Bonkers	Troy	Television series; episode: "Springtime For The Iguana" (no. 27)
1996	Oakie Doke	Denzil	Television series
1996	The Prince and the Pauper	Miles Hemdon	Feature film
1996	The Prince and the Pauper	Shoe #1	Feature film
1996–1999	Animaniacs	Additional voices	Television series
1997	The Age of Innocence	Newland Archer	Feature film
1997	Batman: The Animated Series	Mad Bomber	Television series; episode: "Beware the Gray Ghost" (no. 18)
1997	CBS Storybreak	Green lacewing	Television series; episode: "Yeh-Shen: A Cinderella Story from China" (no. 2)
1997	Space Jam	Hubie	Feature film
1997	Star Trek: Voyager	Motura	Television series; episode: "Phage" (no. 5)
1997	Star Trek: Voyager	Hatil	Television series; episode: "Emanations" (no. 9)
1997	The Sylvester & Tweety Mysteries	Homeowner	Television series; episode: "B2 Or Not B2" (no. 6)
1997	The Sylvester & Tweety Mysteries	Ship captain	Television series; episode: "The Maltese Canary" (no. 9)
1997	The Sylvester & Tweety Mysteries	James Twist	Television series; episode: "It's a Plaid, Plaid, Plaid, Plaid World" (no. 12)
1997	The Sylvester & Tweety Mysteries	Hubie	Television series; episode: "Go Fig" (no. 13)
1998	Captain Planet and the Planeteers	Wheeler	Television series
1998	Cheese Chasers	Hubie	Short film
1998	Dexter's Laboratory	Mat Parallax	Television series; episode: "Sassy Come Home" (no. 26a)
1998	Eerie, Indiana: The Other Dimension	Siggy Lloyd	Television series
1998	Dog Tired	Parrot	Short film
1998	Dr. Dolittle	John Dolittle	Feature film
1998	House Hunting Mice	Hubie	Short film
1998	Hugo the Movie Star	Hugo	Feature film
1998	The Hypo-Chondri-Cat	Hubie	Short film
1998	Life with Louie	Michael Grunewald	Television series; 29 episodes
1998	Little Bear	No Feet	Television series; 39 episodes
1998	Little Bear	Beaver #1	Television series; 2 episodes
1998	Magic Adventures of Mumfie	Mumfie	Television series
1998	The New Adventures of Zorro	Zorro	Television series; 26 episodes
1998	Rudolph's Shiny New Year	Rudolph	Television film
1998	Spider-Man	Harry Osborn	Television series
1998	Spider-Man	Kiosk vendor	Television series; episode: "Chapter XIV: The Final Nightmare" (no. 27)
1998	Spider-Man	Pedestrian	Television series; episode: "Chapter V: Rocket Racer" (no. 32)
1998	Spider-Man	Kingpin's soldier	Television series; episode: "Chapter VIII: The Ultimate Slayer" (no. 35)
1998	Spider-Man	James Rhodes / War Machine	Television series; 2 episodes
1998	Spider-Man	Rooker's Island guard #2	Television series; episode: "Chapter I: Guilty" (no. 42)
1998	Spider-Man	Johnny Storm / Human Torch	Television series; 2 episodes
1998	Tekkaman Blade	Ringo Richards	Television series
1998	The Ugly Duckling	Ugly Duckling	Feature film
1998	Star Wars: Episode I – The Phantom Menace	Bravo 3	Feature film
1998	Star Wars: Episode I – The Phantom Menace	Antidar Williams	Feature film
1999	Fraggle Rock	Junior	Television series
1999	Fraggle Rock	Sprocket	Television series
1999	Magic Mountain	Lion	Television series
1999	The Powerpuff Girls	Lenny	Television series; episode "Collect Her" (no. 15a)
1999	Princess Sissi	Archduke Karl Ludwig of Austria	Television series
2000	Super Pig	Additional voices	Television series
2000	Tomas and the Falcon King	Ostrik	Feature film
2001	Dr. Dolittle 2	John Dolittle	Feature film
2001	The Gypsy Ballerina	Additional voices	Feature film
2002	Adventures from the Book of Virtues	Marcus	Television series; episode: "Citizenship" (no. 23)
2002	Adventures from the Book of Virtues	Rabbit	Television series; episode: "Wisdom" (no. 26)
2002	Jungle Cubs	Akela	Television series; episode: "The Coming of the Wolves" (no. 13)
2002	The Miracle Maker	Jesus	Feature film
2003	The King's Beard	Ronnie	Feature film
2003	What's New, Scooby-Doo?	Shane Flinty	Television series; episode: "Mummy Scares Best" (no. 16)
2004	Balto III: Wings of Change	Balto	Feature film
2004	The Incredibles	Syndrome	Feature film
2004	Mouse Wreckers	Hubie	Short film
2005	The Devil Knows Why	Filip	Feature film
2005	Jack-Jack Attack	Syndrome	Short film
2005	Karol: A Man Who Became Pope	Pope John Paul II	Feature film
2005	Madagascar	Melman	Feature film
2005	Roughly Squeaking	Hubie	Short film
2005	Valiant	Valiant	Feature film
2006	Brother Bear 2	Tuke	Feature film
2006	Cars	Lightning McQueen	Feature film
2006	Cars: The Video Game	Lightning McQueen	Video game
2006	Karol: The Pope, The Man	Pope John Paul II	Feature film
2006	Mater and the Ghostlight	Lightning McQueen	Short film
2006	Night at the Museum	Larry Daley	Feature film
2008	Meet Dave	Dave	Feature film
2008–2015	Cars Toons	Lightning McQueen	Television series; 13 episodes
2009	Bedtime Stories	Skeeter Bronson	Feature film
2009	Geronimo Stilton	Geronimo Stilton	Television series; 26 episodes
2009	Madagascar: Escape 2 Africa	Melman	Feature film
2009	Night at the Museum: Battle of the Smithsonian	Larry Daley	Feature film
2009	Noah's Ark	Xiro	Feature film
2010	Merry Madagascar	Melman	Short film
2010	Planet 51	Chuck	Feature film
2011	Cars 2	Lightning McQueen	Feature film
2011	Gnomeo & Juliet	Paris	Feature film
2012	Madagascar 3: Europe's Most Wanted	Melman	Feature film
2013	Tad, The Lost Explorer	Tad Stones	Feature film
2015	Ant-Man	Scott Lang / Ant-Man	Feature film
2015	Asterix: The Mansions of the Gods	Anonymus	Feature film
2015	The Little Prince	Conceited Man	Feature film
2015	The Little Prince	Policeman	Feature film
2016	Captain America: Civil War	Scott Lang / Ant-Man	Feature film
2016	Madly Madagascar	Melman	Short film
2017	Star Wars Battlefront II	Bossk	Video game
2017	Cars 3	Lightning McQueen	Feature film
2017	Miss Fritter's Racing Skoool	Lightning McQueen	Short film
2017	Rabbit School – Guardians of the Golden Egg	Max	Feature film
2018	Ant-Man and the Wasp	Scott Lang / Ant-Man	Feature film
2018	Norm of the North 2	Norm	Feature film
2019	Avengers: Endgame	Scott Lang / Ant-Man	Feature film
2019	Missing Link	Missing Link	Feature film
2019	Sheep and Wolves: Pig Deal	Skinny	Feature film
2021	Hawkeye	Tomas	Television series; 6 episodes
2021	Loki	Scott Lang / Ant-Man	Television series; episode: "Glorious Purpose" (no. 1); archival recordings
2021	Marvel Studios: Legends	Scott Lang / Ant-Man	Television series; 3 episodes; archival recordings
2021	What If...?	Scott Lang / Ant-Man	Television series; episode: "What If... Zombies?!" (no. 5)
2022	Cars on the Road	Lightning McQueen	Television series; 9 episodes
2022	Rabbit Academy: Mission Eggpossible	Max	Feature film
2023	Ant-Man and the Wasp: Quantumania	Scott Lang / Ant-Man	Feature film
2023	A Cat's Life	Fred	Feature film
2023	The Amazing Maurice	Maurice	Feature film

== Awards and nominations ==
He was awarded Medal for Merit to Culture – Gloria Artis (2014).
