= Mouse Wreckers =

- Title card
- Directed by: Charles M. Jones
- Story by: Michael Maltese
- Starring: Mel Blanc
- Music by: Carl Stalling
- Animation by: Lloyd Vaughan; Ken Harris; Phil Monroe; Ben Washam
- Layouts by: Robert Gribbroek
- Backgrounds by: Peter Alvarado
- Color process: Technicolor
- Production company: Warner Bros. Cartoons
- Distributed by: Warner Bros. Pictures; The Vitaphone Corporation
- Release date: April 23, 1949
- Running time: 6:55
- Language: English

Mouse Wreckers is a 1949 Warner Bros. Looney Tunes short directed by Chuck Jones, written by Michael Maltese and starring Hubie and Bertie in their first pairing with Claude Cat (early unnamed prototypes of the cat by Jones appeared in 1943's The Aristo-Cat and Fin'n Catty, 1945's Odor-able Kitty and Trap Happy Porky, and 1946's Roughly Squeaking). The cartoon was released on April 23, 1949.

The short centers around Hubie and Bertie's attempts to move into a new home by chasing Claude out. Mel Blanc voices Bertie and an uncredited Stan Freberg voices Hubie. The title is a pun on house wrecker or home wrecker, where a house is destroyed, often figuratively, by a single person. Mouse Wreckers was nominated for the Academy Award for Best Animated Short Film for 1948, but lost to The Little Orphan, a Tom and Jerry cartoon which was the fifth Oscar (of seven) given to the cat and mouse team.

The cartoon was loosely remade as Gopher Broke in 1958 (with the Goofy Gophers and the Barnyard Dawg), and later as the Tom and Jerry cartoon The Year of the Mouse in 1965 (also written by Maltese and directed by co-writer Jones).

== Plot ==
Scouting out a new home, Hubie calls over Bertie, who begins to gaze into it before Hubie slaps Bertie to make him realize that before they can move in, the cat Claude, who has an award for Best Mouser - 1948 (along with other mouser awards), must be removed first. Realizing that the task may not be easy, Hubie comes up with several ways to chase Claude out, all of which are designed to drive him crazy, having Bertie do each of the tricks.

First, Hubie lowers Bertie down the chimney on a fishing line. At the bottom of the chimney, Bertie grabs a piece of wood, smacks Claude in the head with it, and is then quickly yanked back up the chimney. When Claude just goes back to sleep, unable to figure out what happened, Bertie is lowered again, pumping air into Claude. When Bertie is yanked back up the chimney and the pump is released, Claude ends up flying all over the living room, hitting all of the walls and ceiling before landing hard on the pillow on which he was resting. Claude then takes the bottle of catnip he had hidden in an overhead lamp, tosses it out the window, and inaudibly mutters the Pledge of Sobriety.

With the logs removed from the fireplace, Hubie lowers Bertie and a dog (resembling Hector the Bulldog) in a doghouse down the chimney. While the dog is sleeping, Bertie pulls out the dog's lower lip such that it snaps back on him, but not before Bertie is pulled back up the chimney. Seeing only Claude, an enraged bulldog viciously beats up Claude before returning to the doghouse, with the doghouse then yanked up the chimney. Completely nerve-wracked as a result of the beating, Claude then runs to the bathroom to take a dose of nerve tonic. While Claude is in the bathroom, Bertie then inserts a lit firecracker into Claude's pillow, which blows up after he returns to it. When Claude finds his arm has feathers, he frantically runs back to the bathroom to check himself, all the while the feathers fly off him when he runs. Claude finds himself without any feathers on and on his arm, then nervously gulps down the remainder of the nerve tonic.

Next, Bertie returns down the chimney and runs a piece of string throughout the house, zigzags through piles of dishes, out of it into a water catch drain, down a ladder, and then back into the house with the other end of the string attached to a rock on top of the chimney. Once Bertie ties the end of the string to Claude's tail, Hubie tosses the rock down the other side of the chimney, which sends Claude flying throughout the house, out of it and back into it, and eventually slamming him into a trash can lid, which begins to drive Claude crazy by flicking his lips up and down.

Claude then reads Psychology of Dreams by "Sigmund Fried" for advice on dealing with what Claude thinks are bad dreams. When Claude falls asleep, Bertie places earmuffs over his ears, while Hubie and Bertie work on nailing everything that would be in front of Claude that was on the floor in the living room to the ceiling and painting the ceiling like the floor and vice versa. When Claude wakes up, he sees this and thinks he is on the ceiling (when he is really on the floor) and jumps up to what he thinks is the floor (which is really the ceiling). Claude is surprised when he grabs a bottle of nerve tonic, only to open it and see it "rise" to the floor. Claude then becomes confused when he enters into the kitchen, where everything is still right-side up. Further driving Claude mad is when he looks out one window where an illusion is given to make Claude think he is upside down (it is actually a painting turned upside down and held by the mice), and then looks out another to make him think he is sideways (another painting turned sideways and also held by the mice), and then out a third to make him believe that the house is under water (in actuality, there is a fish tank on a small ladder outside that window). Finally broken, Claude runs outside from the house, screaming in horror and hides in a nearby tree, trembling in the leaves.

Having accomplished their mission, Hubie and Bertie return down the fireplace and roast cheese over an open fire as the cartoon fades out.

== Home media ==
Mouse Wreckers is available, unedited, on Disc 2 of the Looney Tunes Golden Collection: Volume 2, the Warner Bros. Home Entertainment Academy Awards Animation Collection, and Looney Tunes Mouse Chronicles: The Chuck Jones Collection.
