= In for a Murder =

2021 Polish film by Piotr Mularuk

- Polish theatrical release poster
- Polish: W jak morderstwo
- Directed by: Piotr Mularuk
- Written by: Katarzyna Gacek; Piotr Mularuk
- Based on: W jak morderstwo by Katarzyna Gacek
- Produced by: Piotr Mularuk; Agnieszka Sieradzka
- Starring: Anna Smołowik; Paweł Domagała; Piotr Adamczyk; Rafał Królikowski; Dorota Segda; Szymon Bobrowski
- Cinematography: Adam Bajerski
- Edited by: Agnieszka Glińska
- Music by: Paweł Lucewicz
- Production companies: Yeti Films; Telewizja Kino Polska; Black Photon; Rosco Polska; Dreamsound Studio
- Distributed by: Next Film; Netflix
- Release date: 18 June 2021 (Poland)
- Running time: 105 minutes
- Country: Poland
- Language: Polish

In for a Murder (Polish: W jak morderstwo) is a 2021 Polish crime drama film directed by Piotr Mularuk and based on the novel W jak morderstwo by Katarzyna Gacek. It was released theatrically in Poland on 18 June 2021 before being released internationally on Netflix on 19 October 2021.

== Premise ==
Magda Borowska is a stay-at-home mom from Podkowa Leśna and an avid reader of crime novels. One night on a walk, she discovers the body of a woman. She helps detective Jacek Sikora investigate the murder.

== Cast ==
- Anna Smołowik as Magda Borowska
- Paweł Domagała as Commissioner Jacek Sikora
- Piotr Adamczyk as Robert Mazur
- Rafał Królikowski as Bruno Szeliga
- Dorota Segda as Barbara Szeliga
- Szymon Bobrowski as Jarosław Czerwiński
- Przemysław Stippa as Tomasz Borowski
- Jacek Knap as Dr. Walczak
- Olga Sarzyńska as Elka

== Production ==
The film was shot from August to September 2020 in Podkowa Leśna and Służewiec Racetrack in Warsaw.
