= Singin' in the Bathtub =

"Singing in the Bathtub"
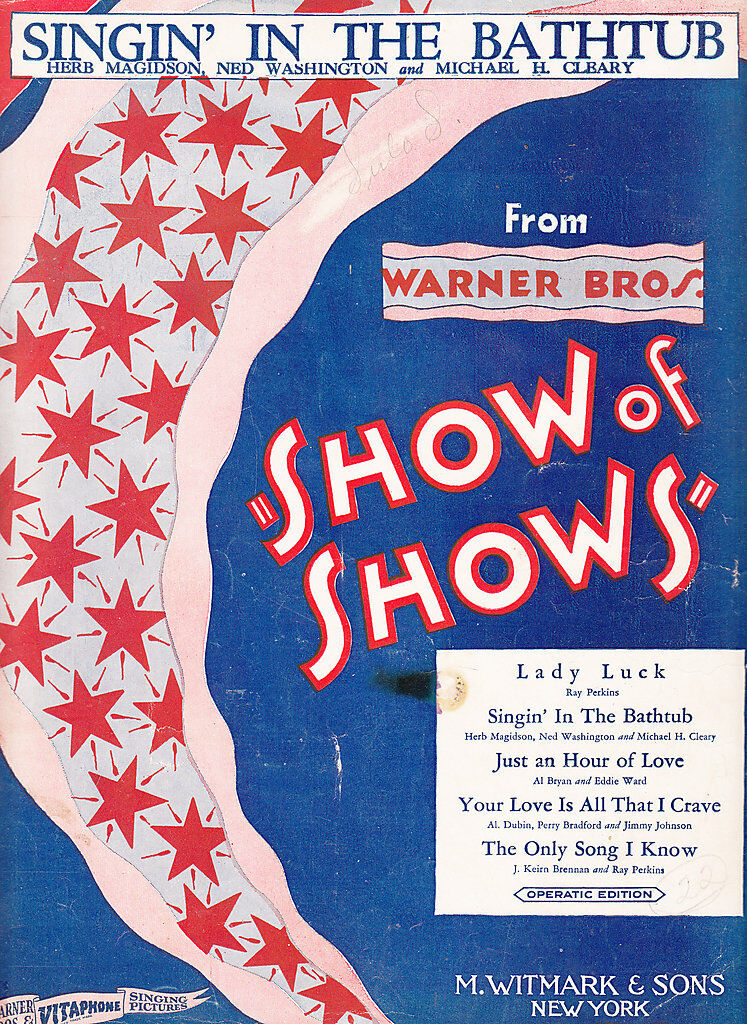
- Sheet music cover, 1929

Song
- Published: 1929
- Songwriters: Herb Magidson; Ned Washington
- Composer: Michael Cleary

"Singing in the Bathtub" is a song written in 1929 by Michael H. Cleary, with lyrics by Herb Magidson and Ned Washington for the film The Show of Shows. The Show of Shows was Warner Bros.' answer to MGM's The Hollywood Revue of 1929, and "Singing in the Bathtub" spoofs Hollywood Revue's song "Singin' in the Rain". In Show of Shows, the number features an enormous bathtub and is performed by Winnie Lightner and a chorus of male performers (some dressed as women) wearing antiquated bathing suits.

The song was recorded by many performers of the time, including Guy Lombardo, Dorothy Provine, Dick Robertson, King Ben Nawahi, Gracie Fields, Vaughn De Leath, The Georgians, and Danny Kaye, and more recently by Robert Crumb, John Lithgow, Mic Conway and Mandy Patinkin. In Vaughn DeLeath's rendition of the song, she sings the line "the ring around the bathtub is a rainbow to me" as "a rainbow from me", substantially changing its meaning.

The lyrics often include a quotation of the title air from "I'm Forever Blowing Bubbles".

== Use in Looney Tunes and Merrie Melodies ==
"Singing in the Bathtub" is featured in the first-ever Looney Tunes animated short, "Sinkin' in the Bathtub" (1930). The song appeared in 20 Warner Bros. animated shorts in total. Warner Bros.' ownership of the copyright saved royalty payments. The song is frequently sung by Tweety Bird.

- Sinkin' in the Bathtub (1930)
- Porky & Daffy (1938)
- Polar Pals (1939)
- Little Blabbermouse (1940)
- Porky's Pooch (1941)
- The Aristo-Cat (1943)
- Hop and Go (1943)
- Daffy Dilly (1948)
- I Taw a Putty Tat (1948)
- The Pest That Came to Dinner (1948)
- Which Is Witch? (1949)
- Wise Quackers (1949)
- Homeless Hare (1950)
- Terrier Stricken (1952)
- Forward March Hare (1953)
- Sahara Hare (1955)
- A Witch's Tangled Hare (1959)
- Tweet and Lovely (1959), sung by Tweety Bird
- From Hare to Heir (1960)
- Compressed Hare (1961), sung by Bugs Bunny
- Wet Hare (1961), orchestral instrumental during the introduction
- The Looney Tunes Show (2011), sung by Tweety Bird

== Cheap Suit Serenaders album ==
Singing in the Bathtub is also the 1993 re-release title of an album by R. Crumb & His Cheap Suit Serenaders. The album was originally released in 1978 as R. Crumb and his Cheap Suit Serenaders No. 3.

== John Lithgow album ==
Singin' in the Bathtub is additionally the title of a children's album released in 1999 with songs performed by John Lithgow, produced by Jai Winding. It was released by Sony Wonder two years after All Aboard!

Track listing:

1. Everybody Eats When They Come to My House (Adaptation)
2. At the Codfish Ball
3. Singin' in the Bathtub
4. A-You're Adorable
5. The Gnu Song
6. You Gotta Have Skin
7. Triplets
8. No One Loves You Any Better Than Your M-O-Double-M-Y (Adaptation)
9. Swinging on a Star
10. I Had A Rooster
11. From the Indies to the Andes in His Undies
12. Big Kids
13. The Hippopotamus Song
14. The Inchworm
