= Lech Mackiewicz =

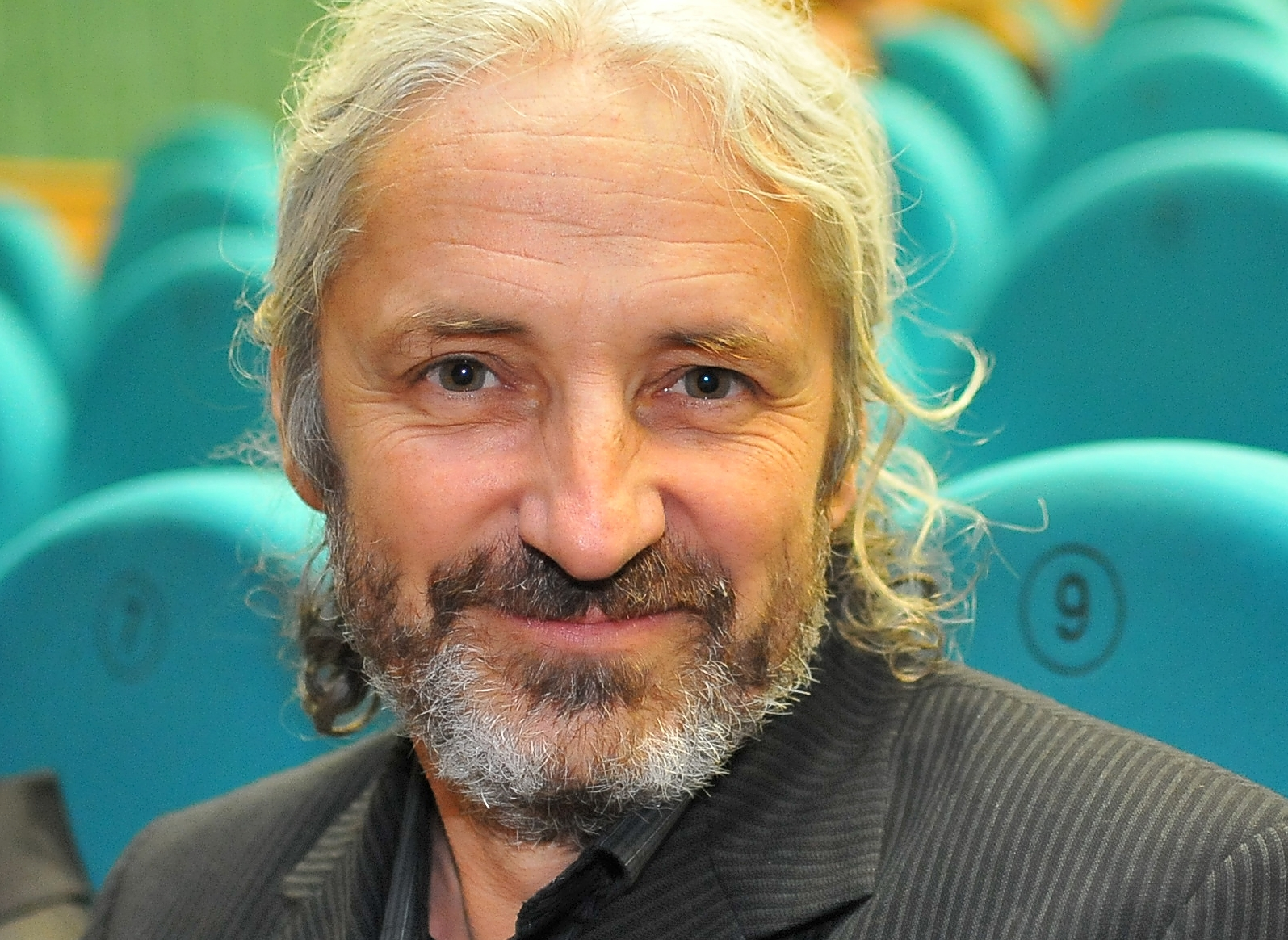
Portrait of Lech Mackiewicz

Lech Mackiewicz (born 1960 in Skierniewice, Poland) is a Polish actor, director, playwright; graduate of the National Academy of Theatrical Arts (PWST) in Cracow (Poland 1983), and UTS (University of Technology Sydney 1987). He formed Auto Da Fe Theatre Co. in Sydney in 1987. He received the New South Wales Performing Arts Scholarship in 1991; assisted Neil Armfield on the production of Diary of A Madman with Geoffrey Rush at Belvoir St Theatre; directed and acted internationally: Australia, Poland, Japan, Korea, Italy. Collaborated with Tadashi Suzuki's SCOT (Japan). He studied in Poland (PWST Kraków, grad. 1983), Australia (UTS, grad. 1987) and with the Moscow Arts Theatre (directing secondment - 1991). Cate Blanchett's first theatre production out of NIDA was Kafka Dances at the Stables Theatre (Sydney 1993) where Lech starred as Franz Kafka and Cate played his fiancée, Felice Bauer.

== Filmography ==
- The Remembrance (2011) Tomasz Limanowski 1976
- Wygrany (2010) Henryk
- Rake (2010) jako George Dana
- Jestem Twoj (2009) jako Konstanty
- 2008: II wojna światowa za zamkniętymi drzwiami jako tłumacz Władysława Andersa
- 1997-2009: Klan jako diler narkotyków
- 2008-2009: Na dobre i na złe jako professor Richard Edwards
- 2008-2009: Na Wspólnej jako Rafał Sobczak
- 2008-2009: Samo Życie jako Kurt Torstensson
- 2008: Jestem Twój
- 2008: Trzeci oficer jako Wiktor Chenoir
- 2008: Jeszcze raz jako Tadeusz
- 2008: Glina jako właściciel klubu
- 2008: Pseudonim Anoda (spektakl TV) jako Wiktor – major Ministerstwa Bezpieczeństwa Publicznego
- 2007: Plebania jako Jerzy
- 2007: Lekcje pana Kuki jako siwy mężczyzna
- 2007: Kryminalni jako Mateusz Bartnik
- 2007: Wszyscy jesteśmy Chrystusami jako lekarz
- 2006-2007: Pogoda na piątek jako Jerzy Lewicki, ojciec Bartka i Michała
- 2006: Będziesz moja jako dziennikarz Jacek, ojciec Kai
- 2006: Oficerowie jako Dyrygent
- 2006: Karol - papież, który pozostał człowiekiem (Karol, un Papa rimasto uomo) jako prymas Stefan Wyszyński
- 2005: Karol - człowiek, który został papieżem (Karol, un uomo diventato papa) jako prymas Stefan Wyszyński
- 2004: Left ear jako Bore
- 2003: Zaginiona jako zakonnik specjalizujący się w temacie sekt
- 2003: Show jako Ojciec wielodzietny
- 2003: Warszawa jako Andrzej
- 2003: Rozwód, czyli odrobina szczęścia w miłości jako Malik
- 2003: One down
- 2003: Marking Time jako Hassan
- 2002: Pianista jako Robotnik
- 2002: To tu, to tam jako Jasio
- 2002: Miss mokrego podkoszulka w Święta polskie jako Adam, mąż Magdy
- 2002-2003: Psie serce jako Wojciech Maliszewski, mąż Małgorzaty
- 2002: Plebania jako pomocnik Cieplaka
- 2002: Julia wraca do domu jako polski lekarz
- 2002: As jako Wiktor, nauczyciel wf-u i diler narkotyków
- 2002: AlaRm jako Negocjator
- 2001: Tam, gdzie żyją Eskimosi jako lekarz na chrzcinach
- 2000: Człowiek wózków jako Monte Christo
- 2000: 13 posterunek 2 odc. 8 - jako szaleniec, odc. 14 - jako ojciec
- 1999: Złotopolscy odc. 146 (Na ratunek) - jako pokerzysta w "Planecie K"
- 1999: Jakub kłamca (Jakob the Liar) nie występuje w czołówce
- 1999: 4 w 1 jako Wacek Napierowski
- 1998: Złotopolscy odc. 53 (Czubatkowa polana), odc. 54 (Narkoman) jako diler narkotyków na Dworcu Centralnym
- 1998: Zjazd koleżeński (odc. 7) w Z pianką czy bez jako klient pubu
- 1998: Spona jako fotograf Żbik
- 1997: Wildside
- 1997: Sposób na Alcybiadesa odc. 2, 3 jako fotograf
- 1997: Sława i chwała odc. 7 (Równina)
- 1997: Krok jako podpułkownik
- 1995: Singapore Sling: Old Flames
- 1994: Book of dreams: "Welcome to Crateland"
- 1993: Seven deadly sins jako Andre
- 1990: Till there was you jako Muzza
- 1987: Relative merits jako Rick
- 1985: Sam pośród swoich jako AK-owiec
- 1985: Kochankowie mojej mamy
- 1983: Ziarno fotografii
- 1982: Odlot jako Marcin
- 1981: Wierne blizny jako Polek Żmijewski
- 1981: Przypadki Piotra S.

== Directed films ==
- Rozwód – Poland 1997
- ToTuToTam – Poland 2001
- Left Ear – co-director (with Andrew Wholley) 2007

== Directed theatre productions ==
- Drzewo – Teatr Wegierki (Poland) 2010
- NaGL – Tap Gallery ( Sydney) 2010
- Shit Happens – Newtown Theatre ( Sydney)

"Hello Out There (Sydney)

- The Island (Sydney)
- King Lear – Playbox (Melbourne) 1993
- Moj brat moja milosc – Jaracza Theatre (Poland) 1991
- Felliniada – Auto Dafe Theatre Co. (Sydney) 1994
- BECKETT: IN CIRCLES – SCOT (Japan) 1991
- So called K. – Mito Arts Co. (Japan) 1992
- Conversations 2 – Auto Da Fe Theatre Co. (Poland) 1996
- Madness – PACT Theatre Sydney 1990
- Grand Theatre Of Oklahoma (Wharf 2; STC; Sydney)
- Krapp's Last Tape ( Poland, Japan, Australia)

== As an actor ==
- The Remembrance (2011) Tomasz Limanowski
- Wygrany (2010) Henryk
- Rake (ep.3 2010) George Dana
- Jestem Twoj (Konstanty) 2009
- Na dobre i na złe .... Prof. Richard Edwards (1 episode, 2008)
  - Kontrowersyjny pojedynek (2008) TV episode .... Prof. Richard Edwards
- Jeszcze raz (2008) .... Tadeusz
- Left Ear (2007) .... Bore
- Stolen Life (2007) (voice) .... Faraday
- "Kryminalni" .... Mateusz Bartnik (1 episode, 2007)
  - Znajomy glos (2007) TV episode .... Mateusz Bartnik
- Inka 1946 (2007) (TV) .... Jerzy
- "Plebania" .... Jerzy / ... (2 episodes, 2002–2007)
  - Odcinek 848 (2007) TV episode .... Jerzy
  - Odcinek 223 (2002) TV episode .... Man helping Cieplak
- "Oficerowie" (2006) TV mini-series .... Conductor
- "Pogoda na piatek" (2006) TV mini-series .... Jerzy
- "Bedziesz moja" (2006) TV series .... Jacek
- Karol – Un Papa rimasto uomo (2006) (TV) .... Stefan Wyszynski (... aka Karol: The Pope, The Man (USA) ... aka Karol. Papiez, który pozostal czlowiekiem (Poland) )
- "The Alice" .... Kirk (3 episodes, 2005)
  - Episode #1.3 (2005) TV episode .... Kirk
  - Episode #1.1 (2005) TV episode .... Kirk
  - Episode #1.2 (2005) TV episode .... Kirk
- Karol – Un uomo diventato Papa (2005) (TV) .... Stefan Wyszynski (... aka Karol: A Man Who Became Pope (International: English title) (USA: DVD title) ... aka Karol. Czlowiek, który zostal papiezem (Poland) )
- One Down (2004) .... Andrzej
- Marking Time (2003) (TV) .... Hassan
- Warszawa (2003) .... Andrzej (... aka Warsaw (USA) )
- Show (2003)
- Alarm (2002) .... Negotiator
- Julie Walking Home (2002) .... Polish Doctor (... aka The Healer (Australia: Pay-TV title) (USA: DVD title) ... aka Julia wraca do domu (Poland) ... aka *Julies Reise (Germany) ... aka Retour de Julie, Le (Canada: French title) )
- The Pianist (2002) .... Fellow Worker (... aka Pianist, Der (Germany) ... aka Pianista (Poland) ... aka Pianiste, Le (France) )
- Where Eskimos Live (2002) (... aka Tam, gdzie zyja Eskimosi (Poland) )
- Miss mokrego podkoszulka (2002) (TV) .... Adam, Magda's Husband
- Czlowiek wózków (2000)
- "Wildside" .... Christian Jasek (1 episode, 1999)
  - Episode #2.12 (1999) TV episode .... Christian Jasek
- Krok (1998) (TV) .... Podpulkownik
- Spona (1998) .... Photographer Zbik (... aka Sposób na alcybiadesa (Poland: TV title) )
- Spellbinder: Land of the Dragon Lord as Dr. Elvo (4 episodes, 1997)
  - "The Best-Laid Plans..."
  - "Barbarians at the Gate"
  - "To Live Forever"
  - "Girl for Sale"
- Singapore Sling: Old Flames (1995) (TV) (... aka Asian Connection: Old Flames (USA) )
- Till There Was You (1990) .... Muzza
- Kochankowie mojej mamy (1986) (... aka My Mother's Lovers )

== As himself ==
- My Mother India (2001) .... Jan
