= Hercules (2014 film) =

American film by Brett Ratner

- Theatrical release poster
- Directed by: Brett Ratner
- Screenplay by: Ryan J. Condal; Evan Spiliotopoulos
- Based on: Hercules by Steve Moore
- Produced by: Barry Levine; Beau Flynn; Brett Ratner
- Starring: Dwayne Johnson; Ian McShane; Rufus Sewell; Joseph Fiennes; Peter Mullan; John Hurt
- Cinematography: Dante Spinotti
- Edited by: Mark Helfrich; Julia Wong
- Music by: Fernando Velázquez
- Production companies: Paramount Pictures; Metro-Goldwyn-Mayer Pictures; Flynn Picture Company; Radical Studios; Film 44; RatPac Entertainment; Mid Atlantic Films
- Distributed by: Paramount Pictures
- Release date: July 25, 2014
- Running time: 98 minutes
- Country: United States
- Language: English
- Budget: $100 million
- Box office: $244.8 million

Hercules is a 2014 American action-adventure fantasy film directed by Brett Ratner from a screenplay by Ryan J. Condal and Evan Spiliotopoulos. It stars Dwayne Johnson as Hercules, a self-proclaimed demigod who is hired to lead the armies of Thrace into battle against a warlord. Ian McShane, Rebecca Ferguson, Rufus Sewell, Joseph Fiennes, Peter Mullan, and John Hurt also star. The film is based on Steve Moore's graphic novel Hercules, specifically the limited series The Thracian Wars.

Hercules was released by Paramount Pictures on July 25, 2014. It was one of two Hollywood studio Hercules films released in 2014, the other being The Legend of Hercules. The film became a box office success, earning $244 million on a $100 million budget, and received mixed reviews from critics, with some praise for Johnson's performance and the action sequences, though the screenplay and plot received criticism.

== Plot ==
Hercules leads a band of mercenaries composed of king-turned-prophet Amphiaraus of Argos, thief Autolycus of Sparta, mute and feral barbarian Tydeus of Thebes, Amazon archer Atalanta of Scythia, and storyteller and nephew to Hercules, Iolaus of Athens. Hercules is said to be the demigod son of Zeus, who completed the legendary Twelve Labors after being betrayed by Hera, who drove him insane and caused him to murder his wife and children during a visit to King Eurystheus. It remains unclear whether Hercules is truly the son of Zeus, and many are skeptical of the claim as well as of the stories of his Twelve Labors. Despite this, Hercules displays unusual inhuman strength and nigh-unmatched skill in combat as well as a potent healing factor. He is also frequently haunted by the memory of the deaths of loved ones as well as visions of Cerberus.

On the Macedonian Coast in Northern Greece in 358 BC, Hercules and his team are approached by Ergenia. Her father, King Cotys wants Hercules to train the armies of Thrace to defend the kingdom from bloodthirsty warlord/sorcerer Rhesus. Hercules accepts after being offered his weight in gold, and the band is welcomed to Thrace by Cotys and General Sitacles, leader of the Thracian army. When Rhesus reaches Central Thrace, Cotys insists that Hercules lead the army into battle to defend the Bessi tribe there despite Hercules's objections and the army's lack of training. However, they are too late, as Rhesus' supposed sorcery has turned the Bessi against the Thracians. After the Bessi are defeated following a long and disastrous battle which results in at least half the Thracian forces being killed, Hercules and his allies properly train the army. When the training is complete, Hercules and Sitacles confront Rhesus' army before Mount Asticus. After an arduous battle, Hercules' side wins.

Rhesus is taken back to Thrace as a prisoner, where he is publicly humiliated. Taking pity, Hercules stops the townsfolk from throwing more objects at him. When Hercules mentions Rhesus' actions of burning down villages, Rhesus tells him it was not him or his army that committed those atrocities.

Later in the palace hall, Rhesus is chained up and left on display. Noticing that Ergenia has taken pity on him, Hercules confronts her and finds out Rhesus was telling the truth. He was merely retaliating against Cotys' attempts to expand his kingdom. Ergenia does not agree with Cotys's methods but goes along with them out of fear, as her cruel father already poisoned her husband, the previous king. Furthermore, Cotys threatens his grandson Arius, the true heir to the throne.

After receiving their reward, the mercenaries are ready to leave, but Hercules decides to stay behind and stop Cotys. All but Autolycus choose to follow him. However, they are overpowered and captured by Sitacles and his men.

While chained, Hercules is confronted by King Eurystheus, who is in league with Cotys. Eurystheus reveals that he drugged Hercules the night his family died, viewing him as a threat to his power. Hercules' family was actually killed by three black wolves sent by Eurystheus, resulting in Hercules' constant hallucinations of Cerberus. When Cotys orders Ergenia to be executed for her betrayal, Hercules is encouraged by Amphiaraus to believe in himself. In a show of superhuman strength, Hercules breaks free of his chains, saving Ergenia and defeating the wolves single-handedly. Hercules releases the prisoners, including Rhesus, and then confronts Eurystheus, killing him and avenging his family. However, he is ambushed by Sitacles, who is then stabbed to death by Iolaus.

Outside, Hercules and his forces battle Cotys' army. Arius is taken hostage, but rescued by Autolycus, who has decided to return to help his friends. In the ensuing battle, Tydeus is mortally wounded while protecting Arius, but fights on, slaughtering numerous soldiers until he falls and dies in Hercules's arms, but not before saying Hercules's name. Again using inhuman strength, Hercules pushes a massive statue of Hera from its foundations and uses it to crush Cotys and many of his soldiers.

Impressed by this feat, the surviving soldiers bow to Hercules, recognizing him as a demigod and the son of Zeus, as lightning strikes in the background. Arius takes the throne with Ergenia at his side.

== Cast ==
- Dwayne Johnson as Hercules, the mythical hero with super-strength who is the son of Zeus
- Irina Shayk as Megara, the late wife of Hercules.
- Rebecca Ferguson as Ergenia, the Princess of Thrace
- Ian McShane as Amphiaraus, the former king-turned-seer who foresees an imminent death
- Rufus Sewell as Autolycus, the rogue thief
- Aksel Hennie as Tydeus, the mute wild barbarian
- Ingrid Bolsø Berdal as Atalanta, the Amazon archer
- Reece Ritchie as Iolaus, the storyteller and Hercules's nephew
- Tobias Santelmann as Rhesus, a supposed bloodthirsty warlord and sorcerer who is rebelling against Cotys
- Joseph Fiennes as King Eurystheus, a former employer of Hercules
- Peter Mullan as General Sitalces, the Commander of Thrace's army
- Isaac Andrews as Arius, the Crown Prince of Thrace
- John Hurt as King Cotys, the power-drunk ruler of Thrace, the father of Ergenia, and grandfather of Arius who tricks Hercules' group into aiding him
- Joe Anderson as Phineas, King Cotys's advisor
- Steve Peacocke as Stephanos
- Barbara Palvin as Antimache
- Ian Whyte as Bessi Leader
- Christopher Fairbank as Gryza, the leader of the Macedonian pirates
- Robert Maillet as Thracian Executioner
- Karolina Szymczak as Alcmene

== Production ==
The film was written by Ryan J. Condal and Evan Spiliotopoulos, directed by Brett Ratner, and produced by Ratner alongside Beau Flynn and Barry Levine. Peter Berg, Sarah Aubrey, Ross Fanger, and Jesse Berger served as executive producers.

Dwayne Johnson underwent eight months of physical training in preparation for the lead role. During filming in Budapest, he lived alone for six months, which he said was intended to help him immerse himself in the character.

== Reception ==
=== Box office ===
Hercules grossed $72.7 million in the United States and Canada, and $172.1 million in other territories, for a worldwide total of $244.8 million.

In the United States, Hercules was released on July 25, 2014, at 3,595 theaters. It grossed $11 million its opening day and $29 million in its opening weekend, finishing second at the box office behind fellow newcomer Lucy ($44 million). Ray Subers of Box Office Mojo opined this was "not a particularly strong start" for Hercules given that "star Dwayne 'The Rock' Johnson's The Scorpion King opened to $36 million" in 2002.

Hercules, described as "pumping some much-needed life into a lackluster summer at U.S. and Canadian theaters," did financially better than expected, as it "topped the expectations of analysts by roughly $4 million" and beat out Dawn of the Planet of the Apes, which was in its third weekend and finished third with $16.4 million." Subers stated, "The fact that Hercules got close to $30 million is a testament to The Rock's ability to mobilize his massive fanbase." Paramount Pictures jointly released the film with MGM; head of domestic marketing and distribution of Paramount Pictures, Megan Colligan, "credited Johnson's 'charisma' with helping drive the opening," and added that the opening weekend total is "exactly what [they] had hoped for." The audience for Hercules was 58 percent male, with 64 percent over age 25.

Outside North America, the film was released in 26 foreign markets in 3,364 locations and earned $28.7 million. Its best countries were Russia ($12 million from 930 theaters), Australia ($3.5 million from 222), Malaysia ($1.6 million from 110), Philippines ($1.2 million from 134), Taiwan ($1.2 million), and Singapore ($1.1 million from 27). Globally, it made $6 million from IMAX showings, including $2 million from 114 international screens.

=== Critical response ===
Hercules received mixed reviews from critics. Review aggregation website Rotten Tomatoes reports an approval rating of 58% based on 120 reviews, with an average rating of 5.3/10. The site's critics' consensus reads: "Hercules has Brett Ratner behind the cameras and Dwayne Johnson rocking the loincloth—and delivers exactly what any reasonable person reading that description might expect." Metacritic gives the film a weighted average score of 47 out of 100, based on 25 critics, indicating "mixed or average" reviews. Audiences polled by CinemaScore gave the film an average grade of "B+" on an A+ to F scale.

Scott Foundas, chief film critic for Variety, wrote in a positive review that "It's a grandly staged, solidly entertaining, old-fashioned adventure movie that does something no other Hercules movie has quite done before: It cuts the mythical son of Zeus down to human size (or as human as you can get while still being played by Dwayne Johnson)". Foundas praised Ratner, stating that "in terms of sheer scale and craftsmanship, Hercules represents something of a quantum leap for Ratner" and that the action sequences are "coherent pieces [...] that build steadily in intensity." He concluded that "[Hercules's] strongest asset is surely Johnson, who continues to foster one of the most affable, guileless screen personas in movies today."

Elizabeth Weitzman of the New York Daily News stated, "It's fast-paced, funny, and packed with eye-popping action. The effects are impressive, but there are none bigger than the star Dwayne Johnson's massive, powerful physique, which perfectly suited the character and the large-scale movie." She added, "Johnson makes his entrance wearing a conquered lion's head and a loincloth skirt. The fact that he can pull this look off sets the tone for everything else to come."

John DeFore of The Washington Post stated, "[The film] simply fails to exploit its assets: an amusing, revisionist take on the mythological strongman, and the charisma of Dwayne 'The Rock' Johnson." Critic James Berardinelli said, "A big-budget misfire of a sizeable order, a visually busy but emotionally dead endeavor that wearies the viewer with endless computer generated special effects while failing to provide a scintilla of human interest."

=== Accolades ===
The film was nominated for two Teen Choice Awards. Dwayne Johnson, was nominated in the category "Choice Summer Movie Star" and the film was nominated in the category "Choice Summer Movie".

=== Home media ===
Hercules was released on Blu-ray 3D, Blu-ray and DVD on November 4, 2014, by Paramount Home Entertainment.

== Controversy ==
According to comic book writer Alan Moore—who was friends with Steve Moore (no relation), the author of the film's source material comic book Hercules—Steve wanted to have his name uncredited after finding out in his contract that he would not be consulted or paid for the film. However, following Steve's death, his name was credited anyway, which Alan believed was only done for publicity. Alan also criticized the film's expected alterations to the source material.

== See also ==
- List of films featuring Hercules
