= Claude Cat =

Warner Bros. theatrical cartoon character

- Looney Tunes/Merrie Melodies character
- Claude Cat (left) with Pussyfoot and Marc Antony in Feline Frame-Up (1954)
- First appearance: Mouse Wreckers (1949)
- Created by: Chuck Jones
- Voiced by: Mel Blanc (1949–1962); John Kassir (2017–present); Eric Bauza (2021–2026)

In-universe information
- Species: Cat
- Gender: Male
- Nationality: American

Claude Cat is an animated cartoon character in the Looney Tunes and Merrie Melodies series of cartoons from Warner Bros. Cartoons.

== Character biography ==
Claude Cat had his origins in several other cat characters used by animator Chuck Jones from 1943 to 1946. These cats were mostly similar in appearance and temperament, with different colored fur and anxious personalities. For example, in the 1943 film The Aristo Cat, Jones paired his unnamed cat with black fur (identified as "Pussy" on the bathtub) against the mind-manipulating mouse duo, Hubie and Bertie. In the 1943 film Fin'n Catty, the same cat has a manipulation with water and a goldfish in the style of Sylvester and Tweety. An orange cat appeared in Odor-able Kitty (1945; the debut of Pepé Le Pew). The black unnamed cat would make his final appearance in the 1946 film Roughly Squeaking.

Jones redesigned the neurotic feline for the 1949 film Mouse Wreckers (perhaps to distinguish him from Friz Freleng's popular puss, Sylvester). The short is another Hubie and Bertie vehicle, only this time, the antagonist they antagonize is Claude, drawn as he would appear in all future cartoons: yellow, with a red shock of hair and a white belly (his exact markings, however, would vary from cartoon to cartoon). In this, as in all future Claude Cat cartoons, Jones' careful attention to personality is easily evident. Claude is a nervous and lazy animal. His attempts to protect his home from the manipulative mice Hubie and Bertie prove futile as the rodents torment him by (among other things) putting upside down and sideways landscape paintings and an aquarium in the windows or by nailing the furniture to the ceiling. Jones set the mice on Claude once more in the 1950 film The Hypo-Chondri-Cat. This time, the miniature Machiavellis convince the neurotic Claude that he is dead. Claude would run afoul of the mice once more in 1951's Cheese Chasers and against another mouse duo in Mouse-Warming in 1952.

Jones added another idiosyncrasy to Claude's id in another 1950 film, Two's a Crowd. Here, Claude is scared out of his mind by a diminutive dog named Frisky Puppy, newly adopted by Claude's owners. The main theme, however, is jealousy, as Claude's attempts to oust the intruder repeatedly fail due to the cat's intense cowardice - a running gag has Claude repeatedly leaping up and clinging to the ceiling, shivering in fear, after the puppy playfully comes up behind him and barks. At the end, however Claude gets revenge by sneaking up behind Frisky and barking, causing the puppy to leap up and cling to the ceiling, also shivering in fear. Jones repeated the scenario with slight variations in Terrier-Stricken in 1952 and No Barking in 1954 (the latter changing the color of Claude's fur from full yellow to orange and yellow and featuring a cameo by Tweety at the end).

In future cartoons, Jones recast Claude as a silent villain, still possessing his full set of neuroses. This stage of the character's evolution is best exemplified in the 1954 film Feline Frame-Up and in the 1958 film (his final "classic era" cartoon) Cat Feud. In the former, Claude convinces his owner that fellow pet Marc Antony is trying to eat the precious kitten Pussyfoot. Marc Antony is tossed out, allowing Claude the run of the house; that is, until Marc Antony outwits the cat and makes him sign a confession admitting to his crimes. The latter contains a similar, unnamed, cat character who tries to steal a sausage from Pussyfoot.

Claude was played by voice actor Mel Blanc using a quirky, strangulated voice similar to that of Marvin the Martian.

== Later appearances ==
One of the versions of Claude Cat was planned to be made as a cameo in the deleted scene "Acme's Funeral" from the 1988 film Who Framed Roger Rabbit. In that deleted scene, he appears with other animated characters scared when Casper appears at the funeral.

Claude appears in the episode "Mr. Popular's Rules of Cool" of Tiny Toon Adventures.

Claude appeared as one of the spectators in the basketball game of the 1996 film Space Jam.

In the 2006 Bah, Humduck! A Looney Tunes Christmas, Claude Cat has a very brief cameo as a Lucky Duck Superstore employee going home for Christmas.

Claude briefly appears in The Looney Tunes Show opening.

Claude appears in several episodes of New Looney Tunes, voiced by John Kassir.

Claude also appeared with Hubie and Bertie in the Looney Tunes Cartoons short "Frame the Feline", where he is voiced by Eric Bauza.

Claude makes a cameo appearance in the 2026 film Coyote vs. Acme as a clerk working at the Avery, Jones & Maltese law firm.
