= Up on the Roof =

Up on the Roof may refer to:

- "Up on the Roof" (song), a song written by Gerry Goffin and Carole King, notably recorded by The Drifters and James Taylor
- Up on the Roof (musical), a musical play later adapted into a 1997 UK film
- Up on the Roof (TV series), a British children's programme
- Up on the Roof (film), a 2023 UK romantic comedy film
- "Up on the Roof", a song by The Les Claypool Frog Brigade from Purple Onion
- "Up on the Roof", a story in the Bone comics series, included in the collection The Great Cow Race
