= Szymczak =

Szymczak is a gender-neutral Polish surname. In some English-speaking countries it is spelled Schimchak, for the sake of pronunciation. It may refer to:

- Andrzej Szymczak (1948–2016), Polish handball player
- Christian Szymczak (born 1974), American racecar driver
- Emilia Szymczak (born 2006), Polish footballer
- Filip Szymczak (born 2002), Polish footballer
- Karolina Szymczak (born 1991), Polish actress
- Ryszard Szymczak (1944–1996), Polish footballer
- Zbigniew Szymczak (1952–2019), Polish chess player
