= Trap Happy Porky =

- Directed by: Charles M. Jones
- Story by: Tedd Pierce
- Music by: Carl W. Stalling
- Animation by: Ben Washam
- Color process: Technicolor
- Production company: Warner Bros. Cartoons
- Distributed by: Warner Bros. Pictures
- Release date: February 24, 1945
- Running time: 6:52
- Language: English

Trap Happy Porky is a 1945 Warner Bros. Looney Tunes short directed by Chuck Jones and written by Tedd Pierce. The short was released on February 24, 1945, and features Porky Pig, along with Hubie and Bertie, and prototypes of Claude Cat and Hector the Bulldog.

== Plot ==
At Uncle Tom's Cabin, Porky is trying to get some sleep, but mice Hubie and Bertie are down there stealing food and breaking things against his will. He tries to capture them with a simple mousetrap, but fails as the mice prove to be too smart for him. He then gets a cat and it throws the mice out with his contraption.

Porky keeps the cat and goes to sleep, but the cat invites other cats to get intoxicated, play the piano and drunkenly sing "Moonlight Bay". After failing multiple times to throw them out, Porky buys a bulldog from town to get rid of them, but the dog also gets drunk and sings with the cats instead, singing "When Irish Eyes are Smiling". With no other options remaining, Porky resigns to the old saying of "if you can't beat 'em, join 'em", singing along with the dog and the cats.

== Home media ==
Trap Happy Porky is available unedited and restored with its original opening and closing titles on Disc II of Looney Tunes Mouse Chronicles: The Chuck Jones Collection.

== See also ==
- Porky Pig filmography
- Looney Tunes and Merrie Melodies filmography (1940–1949)
