= Sinkin' in the Bathtub =

1930 film

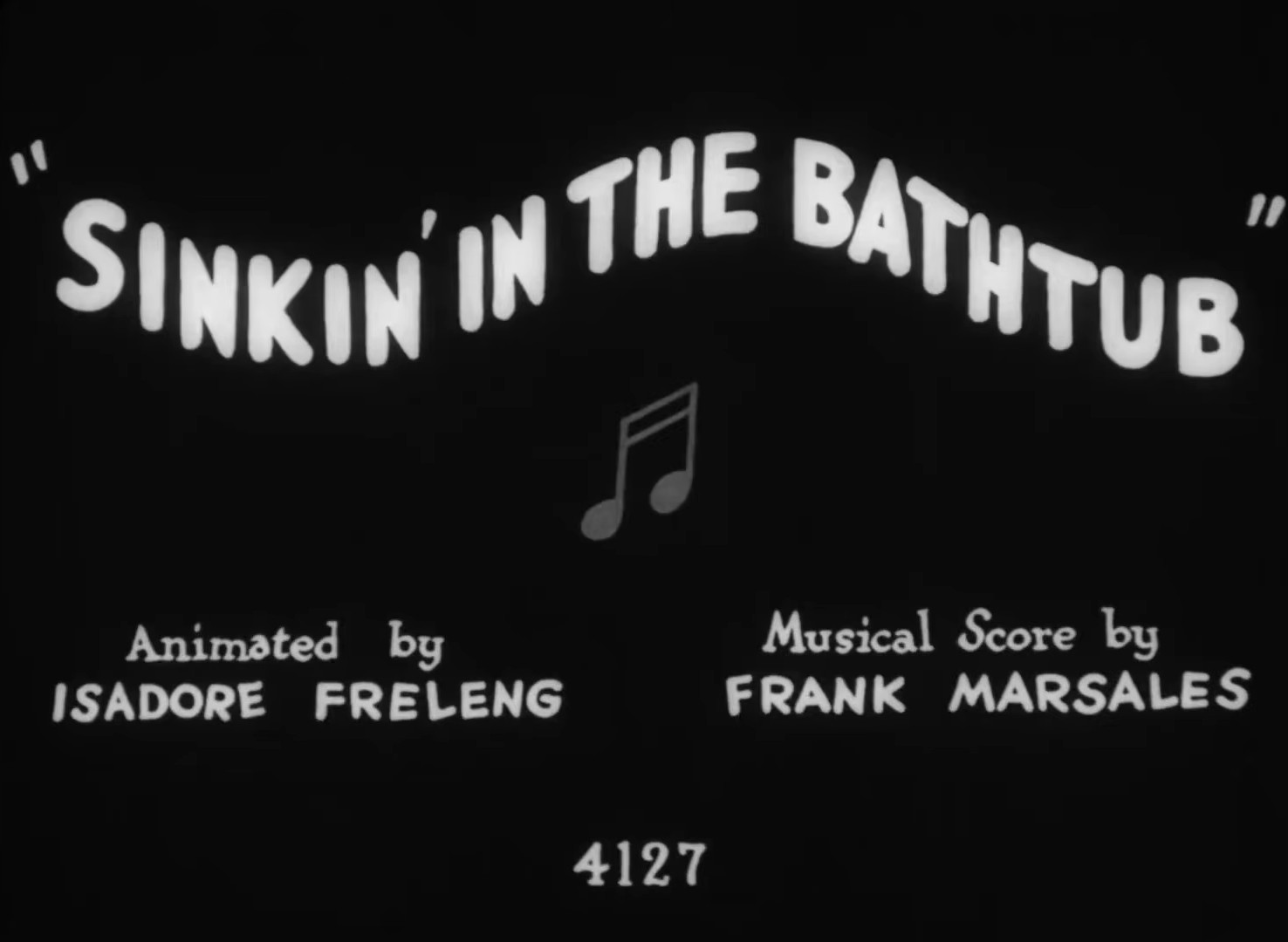
- Title card
- Directed by: Hugh Harman; Rudolf Ising (both uncredited)
- Produced by: Hugh Harman; Rudolf Ising
- Starring: Max Maxwell; Rochelle Hudson (both uncredited)
- Music by: Frank Marsales
- Animation by: Isadore Freleng
- Color process: Black-and-white
- Production company: Harman-Ising Productions
- Distributed by: Warner Bros. Pictures; The Vitaphone Corporation
- Release date: April 19, 1930
- Running time: 7:53
- Country: United States
- Language: English

Sinkin' in the Bathtub is a 1930 American animated comedy short film directed by Hugh Harman and Rudolf Ising. It is the first theatrical cartoon short to be released by Warner Bros. Pictures as well as the first cartoon of the Looney Tunes series. The short was released on April 19, 1930, at the Warner Bros. Theater in Hollywood. The cartoon features Bosko, and the title is a pun on the 1929 song "Singin' in the Bathtub". The film was erroneously copyrighted under the same title as the 1929 song. It is now in the public domain in the United States as its copyright was not renewed.

The name of the Looney Tunes series bears an obvious debt to the Walt Disney Animation Studios' Silly Symphony series, which began in 1929. Steve Schneider writes that this "immediately reveals Harman and Ising's belief that the only way to compete—or even to survive—in the cartoon trade was to cleave to the Disney version."

Made in 1930, this short marked the theatrical debut of Bosko the "Talk-Ink Kid" whom Harman and Ising had created to show to Warner Bros. Bosko became their first star character, surpassed only much later by Porky Pig and Daffy Duck. Notably, this is the only publicly released Bosko short to feature Bosko's original blackface dialect provided by animator C. G. Maxwell; the character would later adopt a more falsetto voice (played by sound effects man Bernard B. Brown and, later on, singer Johnny Murray) for later films. Bosko's girlfriend Honey was voiced by Rochelle Hudson.

Harman and Ising were the short's producers and uncredited directors and animators, with credited animation by Friz Freleng. Leon Schlesinger was credited as an associate producer, and the title card also gave credit to the Western Electric apparatus used to create the film.

Frank Marsales served as music director, arranging the tunes to be played by drummer-bandleader Abe Lyman and his orchestra of Brunswick Records musicians. All of the songs were recently popular numbers in the Warner Bros. catalog, which added a cross-promotional aspect. Beyond the title song which is heard at the beginning and the end, tunes included "Tiptoe Through the Tulips", "Lady Luck" from the 1929 film The Show of Shows, "I'm Forever Blowing Bubbles", and "Painting the Clouds with Sunshine".

== Plot ==
Full short in restored form

Bosko takes a bath while whistling "Singin' in the Bathtub". A series of gags allows him to play the shower spray like a harp, pull up his pants by tugging his hair, and give the limelight to the bathtub itself, which stands on its hind feet to perform a dance and wasting toilet paper. He sends the shower spray out of the window and rides it outside his house.

Once he finds his car, which had left the garage to use the outhouse, Bosko goes to visit his girlfriend Honey, who is showering in front of an open window. "Tiptoe Through the Tulips" plays in the background. A goat eats the flowers he brought, so he serenades her to get her to come out; the goat attempts to humiliate him, only to have his buttocks kicked and leaves while feeling butthurt. A saxophone full of bubbles (caused when she dumps a bathtub full of soapy water into Bosko's saxophone due to his butchering of "Tiptoe Through the Tulips") provide a floating cascade of steps for her as she alights from the balcony. "I'm Forever Blowing Bubbles" accompanies this action.

Bosko and Honey drive into the countryside, only to find a stubborn grazing cow. The cow spits tobacco to Bosko's car, only to be humiliated by being flattened and run over, walking away to the tune of Elgar's "Pomp and Circumstance Marches". The drive continues as Bosko is thrown out of the car, temporarily turning into mini versions of himself before chasing the car up a steep hill, then speeds out of control while Bosko collides into various objects that create the sounds of ascending and descending C major scales. (Bosko exclaims "mammy" in the original version during this portion of the film.) The sequence ends with the car plunging over a cliff into a lake. Always able to adapt, Bosko continues their date as a boating trip and plays the last refrain (a reprise of "Singin' in the Bathtub") using lily pads as a marimba.

== Release ==
The short originally had a special premiere alongside the lost film Song of the Flame at the Warner Bros. Theater in Hollywood on April 19, 1930. Both would be released in theaters in the United States on May 25, 1930. This is the first publicly released non-Disney cartoon to have a pre-recorded soundtrack.

== Home media ==
The short is included as an unrestored extra on disc 2 of the Looney Tunes Golden Collection: Volume 3 DVD set and disc 3 of the Looney Tunes Platinum Collection: Volume 2 Blu-ray set. A restored version of the cartoon is included on disc 1 of the Looney Tunes Collector's Vault: Volume 3 Blu-ray set.
