= Terrier-Stricken =

- Title card
- Directed by: Charles M. Jones
- Story by: Michael Maltese
- Starring: Mel Blanc (Frisky, Claude); Bea Benaderet (Frisky's Mistress)
- Music by: Carl Stalling
- Animation by: Lloyd Vaughan; Ken Harris; Ben Washam; Effects Animation: Harry Love
- Layouts by: Robert Gribbroek
- Backgrounds by: Philip De Guard
- Color process: Technicolor
- Production company: Warner Bros. Cartoons
- Distributed by: Warner Bros. Pictures
- Release date: November 29, 1952 (U.S.)
- Running time: 6:52
- Language: English

Terrier-Stricken is a 1952 Warner Bros. Merrie Melodies cartoon short, written by Michael Maltese and directed by Chuck Jones. The cartoon was released on November 29, 1952 and stars Claude Cat.

== Premise ==
Frisky Puppy's barking at the worst possible moments get Claude Cat into a heap of troublesome situations.

== Plot ==
In the opening scene, Claude is happily eating his dinner but becomes frustrated that there is not more food in his bowl. He gets the idea that because Frisky has not eaten his dinner yet, he can eat the dog's food. Sneaking over to the dog's food dish (the end of his tail is shown as a devil's pitchfork to represent the devilish idea he has), he arrives at the dog dish and is about to take a bite when Frisky sneaks up behind him and barks. Claude is seen flying upward out of the scene. A moment later, we see him with his claws stuck into the ceiling, shaking like a leaf. Frisky downs his dinner in a flash of a second and runs off. Claude becomes disgusted with the dog and begins murmuring while looking at the audience.

Frisky is seen running through the hallway where he sees his ball, and pounces on it causing it to roll under the carpet. He goes after the ball by crawling under the carpet, but he is not quite sure where it is, so he takes a sniff, bites down on the ball and comes out from under the carpet, the ball held tightly in his teeth. He throws the ball up into the air and tries to catch it in his teeth as it falls back to the floor but he misses, and his empty jaws snap shut. He throws the ball up in the air again, but this time it does not come down right after. As he is trying to figure out where the ball is, it drops out of the air and hits him on the head. He gets scared and scampers off behind a wall, yelping all the way. Angrily, he jumps out at the ball and barks at it and walks away, but has to stop for a moment, as he has to scratch. A flea falls to the floor as he looks down at it and gives it a sniff. It jumps at him and he yelps, but as he walks away, the flea jumps back into his fur and he begins scratching again. Frisky's mistress (Bea Benaderet) notices him scratching away and says, "So, Mr. Frisky - I see YOU need a bath! Well, there's no time like the present."

As his mistress carries him, they pass Claude who is watching and sticks out his tongue at Frisky. Frisky escapes and his mistress yells, "Frisky, you come back here this minute!" Frisky hides under the couch, and Claude goes over to the couch skirt and lifts it up with his hind leg as the mistress asks herself, "Where is that dog? Oh there you are, you naughty thing!" and carries him back to the wash tub. We see her pouring boiling hot water into the wash tub when the phone rings. She says, "Oh dear, that phone again! Now you stay right there till I get back!" Frisky is backed into a corner and cannot escape. As Claude tests the water to see how hot it is, Frisky sneaks up behind him and lets out a loud bark. This scares Claude and again he is seen leaping upward out of the scene, and as he falls, he lands in the tub of hot water.

Mad at the dog for scaring him, Claude picks up a pail and fills it with the hot water, and runs through the house after Frisky. He pauses for a moment when he cannot find the puppy, but Frisky sees him and barks loudly again, sending Claude and the hot water bucket hurtling toward the ceiling. Claude lets go of the ceiling, and you know that they say - cats always land on their feet, and just as he is about to hit the floor, he stops in mid-air, the bucket turns upside down and he lands normally on all fours. What is left of the hot water in the bucket empties out on to the floor, and he walks on with the bucket hanging over his body.

Frisky is outside now, and Claude sneaks behind a tree to spy on him. It happens to be the same tree that Frisky is behind, but he does not notice. Frisky lets out a loud bark, sending Claude sailing through the air, and he lands in a watering can. Back inside, Frisky is chewing on part of the carpet and Claude is seen with a bone attached to the line of a fishing rod. He casts the bone to Frisky, but he lets go of the bone and the hook ends up hooking the rim of the fish bowl. It lands on a pillow on the floor and as Claude reels it in, he thinks Frisky is at the end of it and he leaps from behind the wall to scare him, landing with a splash into the fish bowl.

Now Claude is really angry. He sharpens an ax and runs through the house like an ax-wielding maniac. Frisky watches from the upstairs hallway and Claude notices. Claude runs up the stairs toward Frisky, but Frisky sneaks up behind Claude and lets out a loud bark, sending Claude and the ax skyward. Holding onto the ax which is stuck in the ceiling, the handle comes out of the ax, and Claude lands on and starts sliding down the banister. He lands on a roller skate, which sends him wheeling through the house at breakneck speed. As he holds on for dear life, he craftily avoids any furniture in the way and in a chain reaction, he gets shot out the front door and into a children's wagon at such speed, the wagon starts rolling and then hits a brick wall, sending him sailing through the neighbor's upstairs window, freaking out the lady of the house who lets out a blood-curdling scream. She kicks him back out the window and he lands in a rain barrel at the bottom of a downspout. Frisky notices Claude in the barrel and lets out a bark, sending him airborne again. This time Claude has nothing to hold on to, and he falls into the chimney on the way down, clumsily landing on some fire logs which roll across the room. He grabs on to a water dispenser, and he and the logs and the water dispenser fall down the basement stairs with a crash. Claude comes back up the stairs, but he is inside the water bottle; only his feet are outside the lip of the bottle. Frisky reappears and barks at Claude, sending him shooting toward the ceiling again. As he hits the ceiling, the glass water bottle smashes open and what is left of the water falls toward the floor, sending a frightened Frisky out of the scene.

Claude chases Frisky outside again and into a laundry truck. Frisky gets caught in a sweater, but before he can get away, Claude latches on to the sweater with a claw and Frisky runs away, leaving a trail of wool string. Claude ties the string to the truck (thinking that when the truck takes off, it will take Frisky with it) and he follows the string to where he believes Frisky will be when he gets to the end. The string is everywhere - through the banister rails, in and out two mouse holes, through the handles of a vase, in and out of a kettle, through the hot and cold water taps, and into a tipped over trash can. Claude investigates the trash can, but Frisky is nowhere to be found. As Claude grabs the end of the string, the truck's engine starts and it drives off, sending him back the way he came through all of the objects, all the while holding onto the string! (at this point you have to ask yourself, why he did not just let go of the string?) As he exits the house, he is hurtled into the air and lands on a swimming pool diving board in a neighboring yard. As he bounces up in the air, he holds his nose as if he is going to plunge into the water, and as he falls, we see there is no water in the pool and he lands with a thud at the bottom of the dry pool, cracking the cement. In a daze, he starts "swimming" through the broken concrete and the cartoon comes to a close.

== Home media ==
Terrier-Stricken is available as a bonus feature of the April in Paris DVD release, unedited but not digitally remastered. A digitally restored version is available on the Looney Tunes Collector's Vault: Volume 1 Blu-ray set.

== Music ==
- "Shortnin' Bread" (Traditional), by James Whitcomb Riley
- "Singin' in the Bathtub", by Michael Cleary
- "Oh Where, Oh Where Has My Little Dog Gone?", by Septimus Winner
- "Over the Waves", by Juventino Rosas
- "All the Time", by Sunny Skylar
