= Karol: A Man Who Became Pope =

2005 Miniseries

- Theatrical release poster
- Based on: Stories of Karol: The Unknown Life of John Paul II by Gianfranco Svidercoschi
- Screenplay by: Giacomo Battiato
- Directed by: Giacomo Battiato
- Starring: Piotr Adamczyk; Małgosia Bela; Raoul Bova
- Composer: Ennio Morricone
- Country of origin: Italy
- Original languages: English; Italian; Latin; Polish; Spanish

Production
- Executive producer: Camilla Nesbitt
- Producer: Pietro Valsecchi
- Cinematography: Gianni Mammolotti
- Editor: Alessandro Heffler
- Production companies: Taodue Film; Reti Televisive Italiane; Capri Film

Original release
- Network: Canale 5
- Release: 18 April 2005

Karol: A Man Who Became Pope (Polish: Karol – Człowiek, który został Papieżem, Italian: Karol, un uomo diventato Papa) is a 2005 TV miniseries written and directed by Giacomo Battiato. It was created as a Polish-Italian-French-German and Canadian joint cooperation project. Karol is a biography of Karol Wojtyła, later known as Pope John Paul II, beginning in 1939 when Karol was only 19 years old and ending at the 1978 papal election that made him Pope.

The TV miniseries was initially to air in early April 2005 in the Vatican, but it was delayed due to the Pope's death. It was broadcast for the first time by the Italian television station Canale 5 on the first day of the 2005 papal election. Although it was originally broadcast on television, it was also released in theaters, which allowed the film to be shown in Poland.

The incredible success of the movie prompted the creation of a sequel, Karol: The Pope, The Man (2006), which portrayed Karol's life as Pope from his papal inauguration to his death.

== Main cast ==
- Piotr Adamczyk – Karol Józef Wojtyła
- Małgosia Bela – Halina Kwiatkowska "Hania"
- Raoul Bova – Priest Tomasz Zaleski
- Matt Craven – Hans Frank
- Ken Duken – Adam Zieliński
- Hristo Shopov – Julian Kordek
- Ennio Fantastichini – Nowak
- Olgierd Łukaszewicz – Karol Wojtyła (senior)
- Lech Mackiewicz – Stefan Wyszyński
- Radosław Pazura – Paweł
- Violante Placido – Maria Pomorska
- Grażyna Szapołowska – Brigitte Frank
- Kenneth Welsh – Professor Wójcik
- Patrycja Soliman – Wisława

== Soundtrack ==
By Ennio Morricone released in 2007 on 2 CDs.
