= 1745 (film) =

2017 British drama short film

- Directed by: Gordon Napier
- Written by: Morayo Akandé
- Produced by: Gordon Napier; John McKay
- Starring: Moyo Akandé; Morayo Akandé
- Cinematography: Julian Schwanitz
- Edited by: Florian Nonnenmacher
- Music by: Malcolm Lindsay
- Production company: Compact Pictures
- Release date: September 2017 (Edinburgh)
- Running time: 18 minutes
- Country: United Kingdom
- Language: English

1745 is a 2017 British short drama film directed by Gordon Napier and co-produced by director himself with John McKay. The film stars Moyo Akandé and Morayo Akandé with Clive Russell, Buki Adenipikun, and Emmanuel Njoku in supporting roles.

== Plot ==
The film revolves around two sisters: Emma Atkin and Rebecca Atkin torn from their home in Nigeria for slavery, but start a perilous journey from foreign hands through the Scottish Highlands in search of freedom.

== Cast ==
- Moyo Akandé as Emma Atkin
- Morayo Akandé as Rebecca Atkin
- Clive Russell as Master David Andrews
- Buki Adenipikun as Mother
- Emmanuel Njoku as Joseph
- Florence Adenipikun as Young Emma
- Lauryn Adenipikun as Young Rebecca
- Paul Barnes as Hanged Man

== Release and reception ==
The film made its premiere on 30 June 2017 in the Edinburgh International Film Festival. The film received positive reviews from critics and screened throughout the film festivals.

In 2017 at the Africa International Film Festival (AFRIFF), the short won the award for the Best International Short Film under the International Short Film Competition. In the same year, the film won the Best Writing Award at the Underwire Film Festival, UK. Then in 2019, the film won the Best Short Screenplay Award at the Seoul International Film Festival.

Meanwhile, the film also received nominations at BAFTA Awards, Scotland for the BAFTA Scotland Award for the Best Short Film as well as Best British Short at the British Independent Film Awards. At the 2017 Black International Film Festival, the short became a Finalist for the Best Short Film. At the Edinburgh International Film Festival, the film received nominations for Best Short Film - Special Mention. Then in 2018 at the London Short Film Festival, UK, the film was nominated for the Best Short Film.
