= Clive Russell =

British actor (born 1945)

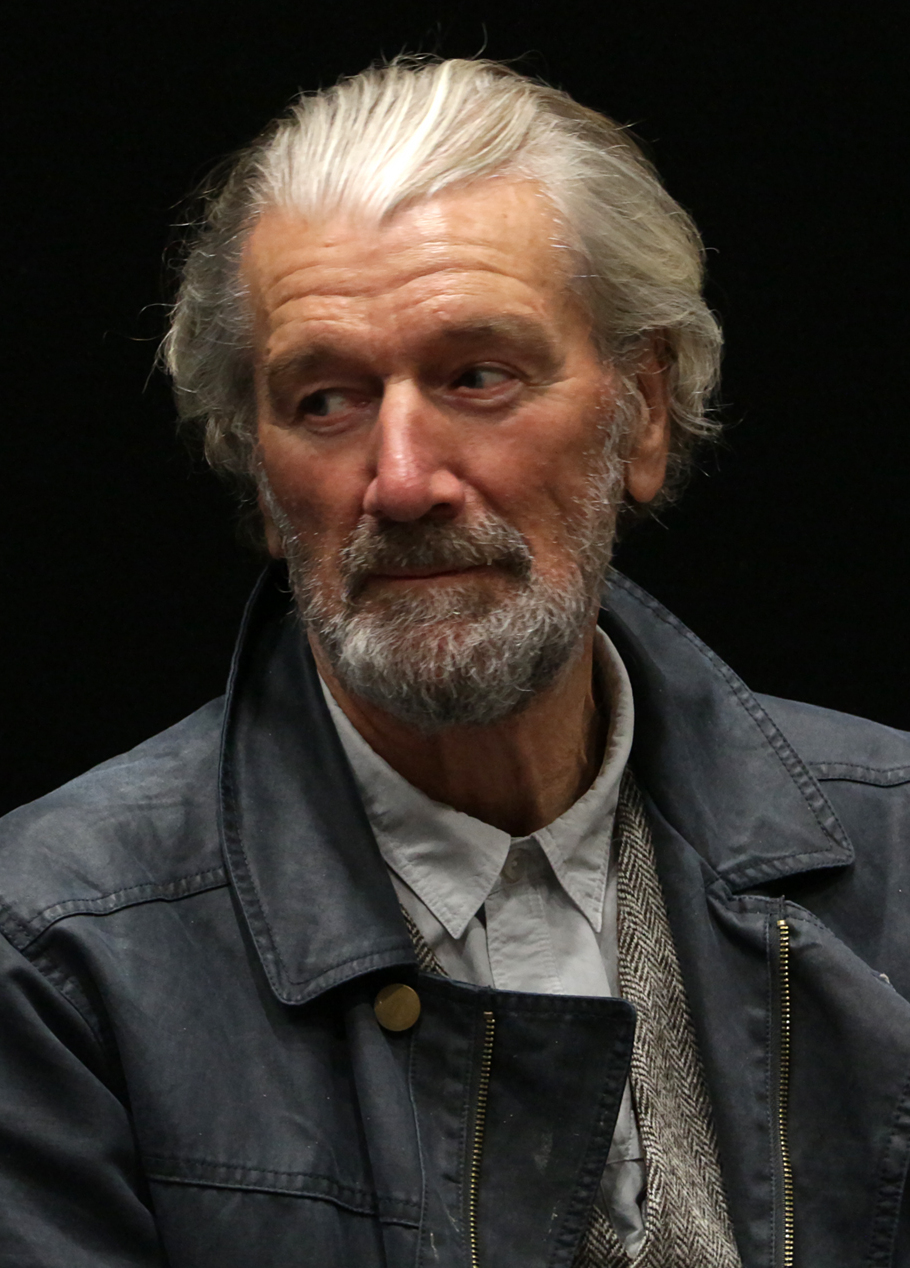
- Russell in 2018
- Born: 7 December 1945 (age 80); Winchester, Hampshire, England
- Occupation: Actor
- Years active: 1960–present

Clive Russell (born 7 December 1945) is a Scottish actor. He is known for his roles as Chief Inspector Frederick Abberline in Ripper Street, Angus O'Connor in Happiness, Lord Lovat in Outlander, and Brynden Tully in the HBO series Game of Thrones.

Russell also appeared in the Scottish sitcoms Still Game and Rab C Nesbitt, teen drama Hollyoaks as Jack Osborne's brother Billy Brodie and British crime drama Cracker as Danny Fitzgerald. He appears in video game Still Wakes the Deep as oil rig manager Davey Rennick, and in Soulframe as Doyen, the player's grandfather figure.

== Early life ==
Russell was born on 7 December 1945 in Winchester, but brought up in Leven in Fife, Scotland.

He studied at Parkhill Primary then Buckhaven High School.

== Career ==
Russell’s first acting job was as the police superintendent in Dario Fo's satire Accidental Death of an Anarchist at Wyndham’s Theatre in 1980. The reviews were good, and he reprised that role for television in 1983. After further honing his skills in various British TV productions and a handful of films – including Jute City, The Power of One, The Hawk and Seconds Out – Russell received exposure before international audiences as Caleb Garth in the celebrated BBC miniseries Middlemarch, based on the George Eliot novel of the same name. A year later, he fell in love on the movie screen with Helena Bonham Carter in Margaret's Museum, for which he earned a Genie nomination at the 16th Genie Awards for Best Performance by an Actor in a Leading Role. After more TV roles and another film, Russell played Ralph Fiennes' father in another critically acclaimed film, Oscar and Lucinda. Growing recognition of his acting skills then brought him major roles in four major TV miniseries: Great Expectations, Oliver Twist, The Railway Children and The Mists of Avalon.

=== Television ===
Russell has appeared in numerous television series including Boys from the Blackstuff, Hope and Glory, Neverwhere, Great Expectations, The Mists of Avalon, Heartburn Hotel, Roughnecks, Monarch of the Glen, Midsomer Murders, Waking the Dead, Silent Witness, Rockface, and Spaced. Russell has also made appearances in Still Game, Happiness, Auf Wiedersehen, Pet, Cracker and The Railway Children. From 2005 to 2006, Russell played Phil Nail in ITV's Coronation Street. Russell made an appearance in Waterloo Road as Lisa and Lenny Brown's grandfather for one episode, also playing Billy Wilson for two in Shameless. He also appeared as a doctor in the 2006 My Family Christmas special.

He has appeared as Jock in the third series of the BBC's Jam & Jerusalem, as "Bayard, King of Mercia" in Merlin and in Hotel Babylon as an artist forced to fake his own death when he is in debt. In 2012, he joined the cast of the HBO fantasy drama Game of Thrones as Brynden "The Blackfish" Tully.

In 2016, he joined the cast of Hollyoaks as Billy, brother of established character Jack Osborne.

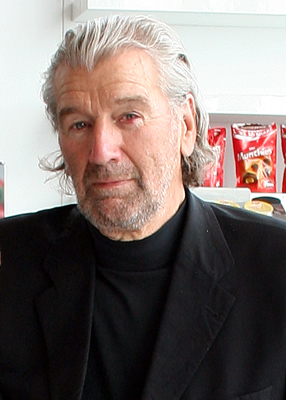
Russell at Collectormania in 2014

In January 2017, he had a small role in the BBC Three comedy Uncle, portraying Sam and Andy's father and later in the year appeared in Doc Martin. He played Ken Hollister.

In 2020, he appeared as Wroth, Chief of a Fey tribe called the Tusks, a recurring character for five episodes in the Netflix series Cursed.

=== Films ===
In Margaret's Museum, he starred opposite Helena Bonham Carter as the Gaelic-speaking Neil Currie. Russell's other film credits include Festival, Ladies in Lavender, King Arthur, Made of Honour, Lecture 21, The 13th Warrior and The Wolfman.

He made an appearance in the 2009 film Sherlock Holmes as Captain Tanner, and reprised the role in the film's 2011 sequel, Sherlock Holmes: A Game of Shadows. He appeared in the 2010 film The Wolfman as MacQueen. Russell also appeared in Robin Hardy's The Wicker Tree, which was released in the first quarter of 2012, playing the character of Beame alongside the Hobbit star Graham McTavish.

He played Inspector Frederick Abberline in BBC One's Ripper Street. He played Tyr in the live-action film Thor: The Dark World (2013).

=== Edinburgh Fringe 2010 ===
In 2010, Russell made his debut one-man show Touching the Blue.

=== Video games ===
Russell made his video game debut with Still Wakes the Deep in June 2024 as the voice of Davey Rennick, the cantankerous manager of an oil rig.

In July 2024, Russell appeared as the voice of Doyen, often referred to as Grandfa', in the playable pre-alpha version of the upcoming video game Soulframe.

== Filmography ==
Year	Title	Role	Notes
1992	The Power of One	Sgt. Bormann	
1993	The Hawk		
1994	Fatherland	Krebs	
1994	The Tales of Para Handy	McVicar	Series 1, episode 4: "A Night Alarm"
1995	Margaret's Museum	Neil Currie	
1996	Neverwhere	Mr. Vandemar	
1997	Oscar and Lucinda	Theophilius	
1998	Heartburn Hotel	Duggie Strachan	
1999	Great Expectations	Joe	
1999	The 13th Warrior	Helfdane	
2001	Spaced	Damien Knox	
2001–2003	Happiness	Angus O'Connor	Main cast
2002	Mad Dogs	Thin man	
2003	The Mayor of Casterbridge	Newson	TV film
2003	Silent Witness	DCS Tom Leith	Episode: "Answering Fire"
2004	Shameless	Billy Wilson	2 episodes (season 1)
2004	Ladies in Lavender	Adam Penruddocke	
2004	King Arthur	Lancelot's Father	
2004	The Rocket Post	Angus Mackay	
2004	Still Game	Big Innes	Series 3, episode 4: "Big Yin"
2005	Faith	Gordon	TV film
2005	Heartless	Ricky	
2005	Monarch of the Glen	Peter Finlay	
2005–2006	Coronation Street	Phil Nail	Series regular
2006	Mist: The Tale of a Sheepdog Puppy	McPherson	TV film
2006	My Family	Doctor	
2007	The Yellow House	Monsieur Roulin	TV film
2007	Joe's Place	Dave	
2007	The Wild West: Billy the Kid	Sheriff Brady	Broadcast March 2007, BBC2, Part 2 of a 3-part docu-drama series on notable Wild West events
2008	Made of Honour	Cousin Finlay	
2008	Lecture 21	Hoffmeister	
2008	Merlin	Bayard	Series 1, episode 4: "The Poisoned Chalice"
2009	Book of Blood	Wyburd	
2009	Sherlock Holmes	Capt. Tanner	
2009	The Bill	Danny Travis	2 episodes
2010	The Wolfman	Maqueen	
2010	Cup Cake	Mute McGill	
2010	The Fighter's Ballad	Father John	
2011	The Wicker Tree	Beame	
2011	Sherlock Holmes: A Game of Shadows	Capt. Tanner	
2012–2016	Ripper Street	Chief Inspector Frederick Abberline	
2013	Mary, Queen of Scots	Douglas	
2013	Thor: The Dark World	Tyr	
2013	The List	Peter	
2013	Waterloo Road	Lawrence Brown	Guest role; 1 episode (Series 9)
2013–2016	Game of Thrones	Brynden Tully	7 episodes
2014	Shetland	Adam Markham	Series 2, Episodes 3 and 4: "Dead Water"
2014	Still	Detective Penton	
2014–2018	The Amazing World of Gumball	Daniel Senicourt; Manly Warrior	4 episodes
2015	After Bannockburn	Robert Bruce	
2015	Mountain Goats	Malton Jennings	Series 1, Episode 2: "Fitness"
2016	The Young Messiah	Weer	
2016	Stella	Uncle Clem	
2016	Outlander	Lord Lovat	1 episode
2016	Hollyoaks	Billy Brodie	Guest role
2016	Barbarians Rising	Cumelios	Docudrama
2017	Uncle	Neville	Guest role
2017	1066: A Year to Conquer England	Harald Hardrada	Docudrama
2017	Back	Paul	Guest role
2017	The Hatton Garden Job	Kenny Collins	Supporting
2017	1745	David Andrews	Supporting
2017	Rellik	Henry Parides	Recurring
2018	The Terror	Sir John Ross	2 episodes
2018	Outlaw King	Lord Mackinnon of Skye	Supporting
2019	Curfew	Mac	2 episodes
2019	Jocky Wilson Said	Jocky Wilson	Voice performance
2019	Supervized	Jerry	
2020	Cursed	Wroth	5 episodes
2020	Dracula	Valentin	1 episode
2021	The Last Duel	King's Uncle	
2021	Code 404	Clifford Major	4 episodes
2021	Queen of the New Year	Various roles	1 episode
2022	The Peripheral	Frank Derosa	1 episode
2022	Silent Witness	Ezra Jarrett	Episode: "History, Part 4"
2023	The Madame Blanc Mysteries	Marco/Dura	Season 2 episode 6
2023	Tales of Babylon	The Silver Dragon	
2024	Casualty	Callum Robertshaw	Season 38 episode 16
2025	Dept. Q	Jamie Lingard	3 episodes
2025	The Sandman	Odin	Season 2
2025	The Wonderfully Weird World of Gumball	Daniel Senicourt	1 episode
2025	The Guest	Derek Abbott	BBC
2025	Shetland	Arthur Mair	Series 10
2025	The House Was Not Hungry Then	Estate Agent	
2026	One Piece	Crocus	Season 2, Episode "Good Whale Hunting"

== Video games ==
Year	Title	Role	Notes
2024	Still Wakes the Deep	Davey Rennick	
TBD	Soulframe	Doyen (Grandfa')	Whilst the game is yet to be formally released, Russell first appeared in its playable Pre-alpha in 2024.
