= Up on the Roof (film) =

- Screenplay by: Ben Hecking
- Produced by: Francisco Cruzat; Lisa Leilani; Alexander Newland; Jeremy Sokel
- Starring: Piotr Adamczyk; Moyo Akandé; Nathaniel Parker; Deborah Findlay
- Cinematography: Simona Susnea
- Edited by: Michael Pentney
- Release date: 16 April 2023
- Running time: 90 minutes
- Country: United Kingdom
- Language: English

Up on the Roof (Polish: Miłość po angielsku) is a 2023 English-language romantic comedy film written and directed by Ben Hecking. It premiered on 16 April 2023.

== Plot ==
Emily and Stephan meet by accident in London 15 years after they broke ip up. Upon meeting again, their feelings rekindle.

== Cast ==
- Piotr Adamczyk as Stephan
- Moyo Akandé as Kate
- Waj Ali as Kaleb
- Deborah Findlay as Claire
- Nathaniel Parker as Whale
- Griffin Stevens as Matt
- Natalia Tena as Emily
- Ragevan Vasan as Michael

== Production ==
The film was written and directed by Ben Hecking and produced by Francisco Cruzat, Lisa Leilani, Alexander Newland, and Jeremy Sokel. The cinematography was handled by Simona Susnea, and the editing was done by Michael Pentney. The main cast included Piotr Adamczyk, Moyo Akandé, Nathaniel Parker, and Deborah Findlay. It premiered on 16 April 2023, at the Polish Social and Cultural Centre in London, United Kingdom, and was later released in cinemas on 21 April 2023.
