= Agnieszka Glińska =

Polish film editor (born 1975)

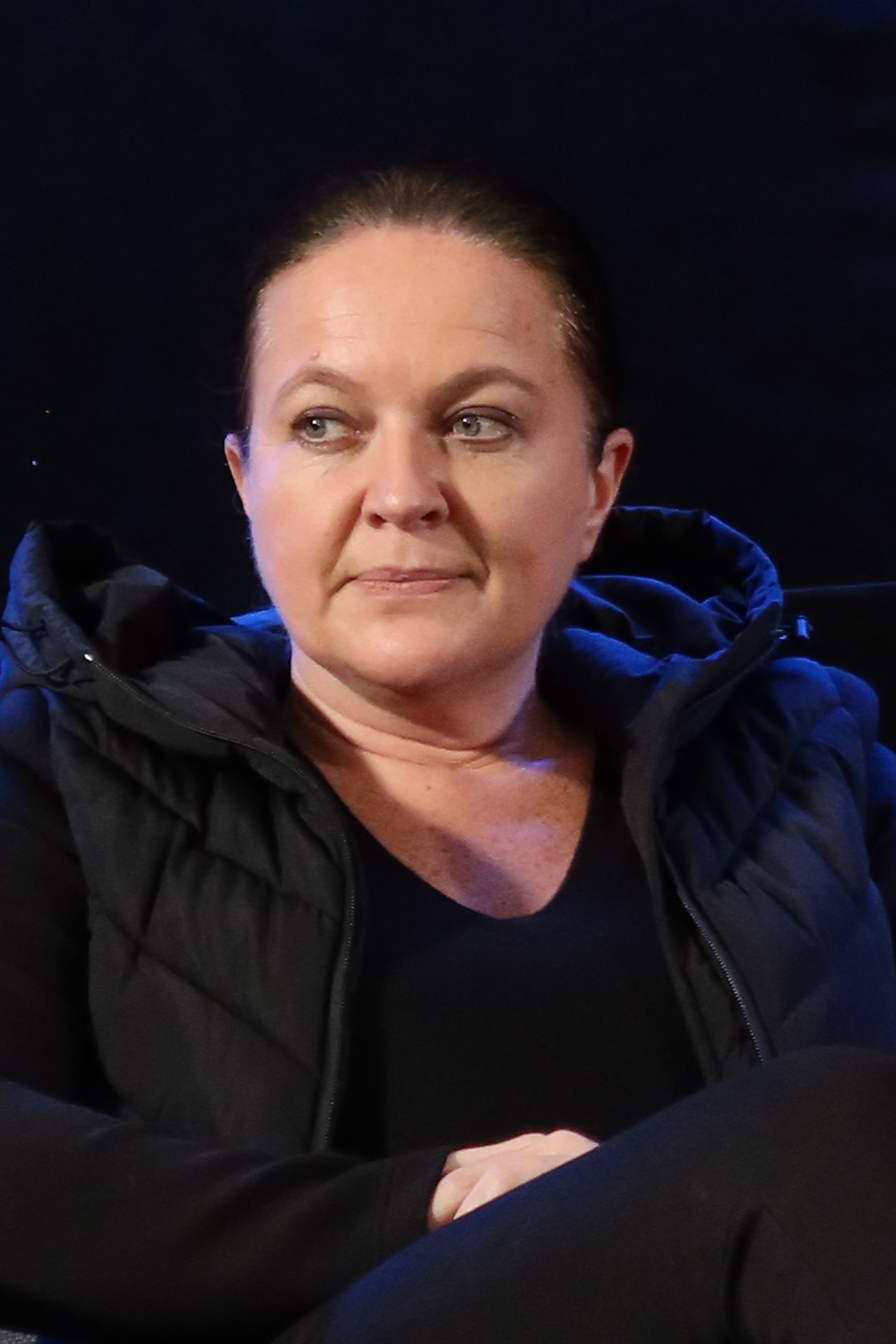
- Agnieszka Glińska, 2025
- Born: 30 November 1975 (age 50); Warsaw
- Occupation: Film editor
- Years active: 2003–present

Agnieszka Glińska (born 30 November 1975) is a film editor.

== Biography ==
She graduated in cultural studies from the University of Łódź, with film specialization, and in editing from the National Film School in Łódź. She was elected a member of the Polish Association of Editors (PSM), a member of the Polish Film Academy and the European Film Academy (EFA). In 2023 she was elected a member of the Academy of Motion Picture Arts and Sciences (AMPAS). She won Polish Academy Award for Best Editing three times.

== Filmography ==
- 2009: All That I Love
- 2010: Mother Teresa of Cats
- 2012: Yuma
- 2014: Difret
- 2014: Jeziorak
- 2014: Dom na głowie
- 2015: 11 Minutes
- 2015: The Here After
- 2015: Koniec świata
- 2016: Komunia
- 2016: Clair Obscur
- 2019: Safe Inside
- 2019: My Name Is Sara
- 2020: Sweat
- 2020: Jak najdalej stąd
- 2020: Maryjki
- 2021: Lamb
- 2021: Operation Hyacinth
- 2021: In for a Murder
- 2022: The Silent Twins
- 2022: EO
- 2024: White Courage
- 2024: The Girl with the Needle
- 2025: Good Boy (a.k.a. Heel)
- 2025: Ministranci

== Accolades ==
=== Polish Film Awards ===
- 2014 – nomination for best film editing for the film Jeziorak
- 2016 – win for the best editing for the film 11 minut
- 2017 – nomination for best film editing for the film Komunia
- 2021 – nomination for best film editing for the film Jak najdalej stąd
- 2022 – nomination for best film editing for the film Lamb
- 2023 – nomination for best film editing for the film The Silent Twins
- 2023 – win for the best editing for the film IO
- 2025 – nomination for best film editing for the film White Courage
- 2025 – win for the best editing for the film The Girl with the Needle

=== Golden Lions ===
- 2015 – win for the best editing for the film 11 minut, The Here After
- 2020 – win for the best editing for the film Sweat
- 2025 – win for the best editing for the film Ministranci

=== Kraków Film Festival ===
- 2014 – Special Award in the Polish Competition: Award of the chairman of the Association of Polish Filmmakers for the best film editing for the film Dom na głowie

=== Jan Machulski Award (OFFskar) ===
- 2016 – nomination for editing of the film Dom na głowie
- 2017 – nomination for editing of the film Koniec świata
- 2018 – nomination for editing of the film Komunia

=== Polish Association of Editors Award ===
- 2025 – nomination, for the film The Girl with the Needle

Source.
