= Moyo Akandé =

Scottish actress

- Born: Glasgow, Scotland
- Education: Arts Educational Schools
- Occupations: Actor, producer
- Years active: 2010–present

Moyo Akandé is a Scottish actress.

== Early life and education ==
Moyo Akandé grew up in Bearsden, East Dunbartonshire, Scotland. Her sister, Morayo Akandé, is a writer and producer.

As a teenager, Moyo auditioned for the Dance School of Scotland at Knightswood Secondary School and landed a place.

Akandé trained as an actress at Arts Educational Schools, London, and graduated in 2008.

== Career ==
In 2017, Akandé produced and starred in 1745 alongside her sister. The short film focuses on two sisters torn from their home in Nigeria for slavery, who start a perilous journey from foreign hands through the Scottish Highlands in search of freedom. 1745 won the Best Short Film Award at the Africa International Film Festival in Lagos, Nigeria, 2017. It was also nominated for the Best Short Film Award at the British Independent Film Awards 2017 in London and BAFTA Scotland in the same year.

In 2019, Akandé appeared in four episodes of the Scottish comedy-drama Guilt.

In 2023, Akandé appeared in the biographical film Tetris. In May 2023, she appeared as Shelley in series 8 of the dark comedy series Inside No. 9; the episode was titled "Paraskevidekatriaphobia", a fear of Friday the 13th.

== Acting credits ==
=== Film & television ===
Year	Title	Role	Notes
2010	Lip Service	Receptionist	1 episode; credited as Moyo Ominiyi
2010	Taggart	Kerrie MacDonald	Series 27, 4 episodes
2013	Bob Servant	Radio Producer	Series 1 episode 1: Launch Day
2015	The Atkin Sisters	Emma Atkin	Short film; also producer
2017	1745	Emma Atkin	Short film; also script developer
2017	Porridge	Officer Gemmell	Series 1 episode 2: The Cake
2017	The Rebel	DS Freeman	Series 2, 2 episodes
2017	Only an Excuse?	Newsreader	
2018	Vera	SSI Sally Peters	Series 8 episode 4: Darkwater
2018	The Hurricane Heist	Jaqi	
2018	Make Me Up	Farrah	
2018	The Cry	Defence Lawyer	4 episodes
2019	Still Game	Interviewer	Series 9 episode 2: Cat's Whiskers
2019	Guilt	Tina Hicks	4 episodes
2019	The Demon Headmaster	Kerri George	2 episodes
2019	Rock, Paper, Scissors	N/A	Short film; producer
2021	Zebra Girl	Detective Reese	
2021	Annika	Mel Hetherington	Series 1 episode 3
2021	Agatha Raisin	Sybilla Triast-Perkins	Series 4 episode 3: A Spoonful of Poison
2022	The Wedding	Mary	1 episode
2022	Up on the Roof	Kate	
2023	Tetris	Lincoln's executive secretary	
2023	Crime	Maria Pearson	3 episodes
2023	Inside No. 9	Shelley	Series 8 episode 3: Paraskevidekatriaphobia
2025	Midsomer Murders	Jenny Pollock	Episode: "Lawn of the Dead"
2026	How to Get to Heaven from Belfast	Carol	Episode: "The Box"
TBA	Man & Witch	Holy Woman	Currently in post-production

=== Theatre ===
Year	Title	Role	Venue
2008	The Wizard of Oz	A tree	
2009	The Lion, the Witch and the Wardrobe		Birmingham Repertory Theatre
2011	Sleeping Beauty	The Queen	Crescent Theatre
2012	Thoroughly Modern Millie	Muzzy	Watermill Theatre
2013	Macbeth	Witch	Shakespeare's Globe
2014	The Lightning Child	Caster Semenya	Shakespeare's Globe
2015	Skins & Hoods	George	Edinburgh Festival Fringe
2018	The Two Noble Kinsmen	Hippolyta	Shakespeare's Globe
2019	Interference	Ida	City Park, Glasgow
