= Fin 'n' Catty =

1943 film by Charles M. Jones

- Original title card
- Directed by: Charles M. Jones
- Story by: Michael Maltese
- Produced by: Leon Schlesinger
- Starring: Mel Blanc
- Music by: Carl W. Stalling
- Animation by: Ben Washam
- Color process: Technicolor
- Production company: Leon Schlesinger Productions
- Distributed by: Warner Bros. Pictures
- Release date: October 23, 1943
- Running time: 6 minutes
- Country: United States
- Language: English

Fin 'n' Catty is a 1943 American animated comedy short film directed by Charles M. Jones. The short was released on June 19, 1943. It is part of the Merrie Melodies series and a sequel to The Aristo Cat, featuring Pussy the cat from that film.

It was re-released as a "Blue Ribbon" reissue in 1948 as Fin'n Catty, rendering the original film and credits lost, though Michael Maltese kept the title and credit cels. Despite copyright neglect by Warner Bros. Pictures, the company realized the mistake and copyrighted the Blue Ribbon reissue, allowing the original film to lapse into the public domain while United Artists renewed the reissue's copyright.

The film without credits

== Plot ==
A goldfish washes his tank to find Pussy the cat watching him, yet cannot tolerate the slightest presence of water on him. He uses gloves to trick the goldfish, only to be bitten by the goldfish's dentures. He uses a worm to bait the goldfish to no avail. The goldfish spits water on Pussy when he uses a hose, before they somehow inflate each other into balloons. The goldfish tricks him into using flypaper to dry his hands, which incapacitates him by sticking his body together, but he recovers. The goldfish finds his tank blocked by Pussy's plate and starts to dehydrate, which Pussy exploits to slowly torture him, as the goldfish hallucinates a desert and promise of water. Pussy eats the goldfish, who escapes quickly to hydrate himself. Pussy corners the goldfish in a flooded and locked toilet and swallows the key, not realizing that he is wholly submerged in water. Unexpectedly, Pussy enjoys being in water and sleeps in the goldfish's bowl to his chagrin.

== Home media ==
This short is available on the Looney Tunes Collector's Choice: Volume 2 Blu-ray.
