= Hercules (Radical Comics) =

Radical Comics character

Hercules is a Radical Comics character who has appeared in two limited series, The Thracian Wars and The Knives of Kush, both written by Steve Moore with Cris Bolsin as the artist. The Jim Steranko "Hercules" from the cover of the first issue is also featured in solid bronze as the first in the Radical Toyz product line. Radical Toyz commissioned sculptor Chris Ingram to bring to life the art that represents Radical's flagship title

== Plot synopsis ==
=== The Thracian Wars ===
The story takes place in barbarian Thrace, in Northern Greece. Hercules and his companions are hired by the Thracian king, Cotys, to train the Thracian army into one that excels in ruthlessness.

=== The Knives of Kush ===
Following their departure from Thrace, Hercules and his companions travel to Egypt where they become embroiled in the civil war between Seti II and Amenmesse.

== Film ==
Paramount and MGM released a film adaptation of Moore's tale, under the direction of filmmaker Brett Ratner, with the title role played by Dwayne "The Rock" Johnson. Aksel Hennie handled the role of Tydeus. Rufus Sewell is cast as Autolycus. Ian McShane appeared in the role of Amphiarus, part priest, part prophet, and part warrior who is Hercules' counselor and confidant. Reece Ritchie was cast as Hercules' cousin, Iolaus of Athens, Tobias Santelmann as the film's apparent antagonist, Rhesus, and Ingrid Bolsø Berdal took the part of the female lead, the Amazon archer Atalanta of Scythia. Also joining the cast were Joseph Fiennes as King Eurystheus, John Hurt as Lord Cotys, Rebecca Ferguson as Cotys' daughter, Ergenia, and Irina Shayk as Hercules' dead wife, Megara. Johnson's cousin, Tamina Snuka, made her silver screen debut in the film.
