= Karolina Szymczak =

Polish actress (born 1991)

- Born: 25 October 1991 (age 34); Złotoryja, Poland
- Education: DSW University of Lower Silesia
- Occupations: Actress, model
- Years active: 2014–present
- Spouse: Piotr Adamczyk (m. 2019)

Karolina Szymczak (Polish: [ka.rɔˈli.na ˈʂɘ̟m.t͡ʂak]; born 25 October 1991) is an actress and model. She performed in feature films such as Hercules (2014), Stars (2017), Diablo: The Ultimate Race (2019), Politics (2019), To musi być miłość (2021), Babylon (2022), The Insurgent 1863 (2024), and Influencer Girl (2024), as well as in television series such as Oko za oko (2018), NCIS: Los Angeles (2022), and Mythic Quest (2025).

== Biography ==
Karolina Szymczak was born on 25 October 1991 in Złotoryja, Poland. She graduated from the DSW University of Lower Silesia in Wrocław, with a degree in online advertising. Afterwards, she moved to Warsaw, where she began working as a model. She was employed to promote numerous fashion brands in the United States and Europe. In 2013, her photos were published in Playboy magazine.

As an actress, she debuted with the role of Alcmene, in a 2014 action-adventure fantasy film Hercules, directed by Brett Ratner. Afterwards, she attended an acting school in Los Angeles, California. Since then, Szymczak also performed in movies such as Stars (2017), Diablo: The Ultimate Race (2019), Politics (2019), To musi być miłość (2021), Babylon (2022), The Insurgent 1863 (2024), and Influencer Girl (2024), as well as in television series such as Oko za oko (2018), NCIS: Los Angeles (2022), and Mythic Quest (2025).

== Personal life ==
Szymczak began dating actor Piotr Adamczyk in 2016, and the couple married in 2019. She suffers from endometriosis.

== Filmography ==
=== Films ===
Year	Title	Role	Notes
2014	Hercules	Alcmene	Feature film
2017	Stars	Marlena Danisz	Feature film
2019	Diablo: The Ultimate Race	Ewa	Feature film
2019	Politics	Julia	Feature film
2019	Remember Cuba		Short film
2021	To musi być miłość	Adela	Feature film
2022	Babylon	Olga Putti	Feature film
2024	Influencer Girl	Sober Kaśka	Feature film
2024	The Insurgent 1863	Antonina Konarzewska	Feature film

=== Television series ===
Year	Title	Role	Notes
2018	Oko za oko	Patrycja	7 episodes
2019	Politics	Julia	
2022	NCIS: Los Angeles	Vavara	Episode: "Down the Rabbit Hole"
2025	Mythic Quest	Anna	3 episodes

=== Radio dramas ===
Year	Title	Role	Notes
2023	Upadek narodu	Additional voices	1 episode
