= Karol: The Pope, The Man =

- Written by: Giacomo Battiato, Gianmario Pagano, Monica Zapelli
- Directed by: Giacomo Battiato
- Starring: Piotr Adamczyk; Dariusz Kwasnik; Michele Placido
- Music by: Ennio Morricone
- Countries of origin: Canada; Italy; Poland

Production
- Producer: Pietro Valsecchi
- Cinematography: Gianni Mammolotti
- Editor: Alessandro Heffler
- Running time: 155 minutes
- Production company: Taodue Film

Original release
- Release: April 16, 2006

Karol: The Pope, The Man is a 2006 TV miniseries directed by Giacomo Battiato chronicling Pope John Paul II's life as pope in flashbacks. It covers the period of his life from the October 22, 1978 papal inauguration to his death in 2005. It is the sequel to the 2005 TV miniseries Karol: A Man Who Became Pope, which portrayed John Paul's life before the papacy and ended on October 16, 1978, the day of his papal election.

== Main cast ==
- Piotr Adamczyk as Pope John Paul II
- Adriana Asti as Mother Teresa
- Leslie Hope as Julia Ritter
- Timothy Martin
- Michele Placido
- Alkis Zanis as Ali Ağca
- Carlos Kaniowsky as Óscar Arnulfo Romero y Galdámez
- Fabrice Scott as Jerzy Popiełuszko
- Paolo Maria Scalondro as Wojciech Jaruzelski

== Reception ==
A review in The StarPhoenix called Karol: The Pope, The Man "a remarkable film – remarkable because it manages to be both profound and entertaining", and praised actor Piotr Adamczk for his portrayal of John Paul.
