= Hubie and Bertie =

Warner Bros. theatrical cartoon character

- Looney Tunes/Merrie Melodies characters
- Bertie & Hubie in Mouse Wreckers
- First appearance: The Aristo Cat (1943)
- Created by: Chuck Jones
- Voiced by: Hubie: Tedd Pierce (1943); Dick Nelson (1946); Stan Freberg (1947–1949); Mel Blanc (1950–1951); Jim Cummings (1995–2000); Bob Bergen (1996); Joe Alaskey (2005); Jeff Bennett (2017); Eric Bauza (2019–2026); Sean Kenin (2021–2023); Bertie: Michael Maltese (1943); Mel Blanc (1945, 1949); Stan Freberg (1946–1951); Jeff Bennett (1995–2000, 2017); Bob Bergen (1996); Steve Kehela (1996); Joe Alaskey (2005); Eric Bauza (2019–2026); Sean Kenin (2021–2023)

In-universe information
- Species: Deer mouse
- Annoyances Enemies: Cats

Hubie and Bertie are animated cartoon mouse characters created by Chuck Jones for Looney Tunes and Merrie Melodies series of cartoons. Hubie and Bertie represent a shift in Jones' style from Disney-like sentimentality to sardonic humor. Seven Hubie and Bertie cartoons were produced between 1943 and 1951.

== Debut ==
Jones introduced Hubie and Bertie in the short The Aristo Cat, first released on June 19, 1943. The plot of the cartoon would serve as the template for most future Hubie/Bertie outings: a character with some mental illness or degree of naïveté is psychologically tormented by the pair. In The Aristo Cat, the cat is left in the care of a butler while its owner is away. After becoming fed up with the spoiled cat's abusive treatment, the butler quits, abandoning the cat. The cat has no one to feed it. It reads in a book that cats eat mice, but has no idea what a mouse looks like. Then the cat encounters Hubie and Bertie and the duo quickly realize the cat does not know they are mice. When the cat asks for help in finding something to eat, they point to a sleeping bulldog outside, telling the hungry cat that it's a mouse. When the cat goes out to eat the dog that it thinks is a mouse, it leads to several painful encounters for the cat.

Hubie and Bertie as designed by Jones are mice with long snouts, large ears, and big, black noses. The two are anthropomorphic, walking on their stubby hind legs and using their forelimbs as arms. They are primarily distinguished by their color: one is brown with a lighter-colored belly and face, while the other is gray. Hubie has a Brooklyn accent ("Hey, Boit! C'mere!"). Bertie has large buck teeth, and a habit of responding to Hubie with "Yeah-yeah, sure-sure!" or snickering "Riot!" if Hubie has just proposed some scheme with comic potential.

== Development ==
Bertie made a cameo in Odor-able Kitty.

Trap Happy Porky (February 24, 1945) was their second appearance. Nameless, indistinguishable except for color, they appear only in the first act, stealing food from Porky in nightshirt and cap. They are silent except for a single "I'm only three and a half years old", and retreat when a cat shows up.

Jones would repeat the theme of mind games several more times in his Hubie and Bertie shorts, as in their third cartoon, Roughly Squeaking on November 23, 1946. This time, Jones has the mice exploit a cat's stupidity by convincing him he is a lion and a dog is a moose he wants to eat. By the short's end, the cat thinks he is a lion, the dog believes he is a pelican, and a bystanding bird (driven mad from watching the two) has pulled his feathers out and imagines himself a Thanksgiving turkey.

The short was followed by House Hunting Mice on September 6, 1947, where Hubie and Bertie run afoul of a housekeeping robot.

In The Aristo Cat, writers Tedd Pierce and Michael Maltese provide the voices for Hubie and Bertie respectively. In Trap-Happy Porky, Mel Blanc provided the voice for the duo's single line. For the rest of the Golden Age era cartoons, the voices of the duo are provided by Mel Blanc and Stan Freberg, with one exception, Roughly Squeaking, where Dick Nelson provides the voice of Hubie opposite Stan Freberg as Bertie.

== Cat and mouse ==
Jones introduced a permanent "antagonist" of sorts for the mice in Mouse Wreckers. The short was released in 1949 and was the first in which they are officially billed as "Hubie" and "Bertie" on a title card. In the cartoon, the duo moves into a new home, only to discover that it is protected by champion mouser Claude Cat (the character's debut), voiced by Mel Blanc. The mice torment the cat both physically and mentally. The short was nominated for an Academy Award.

The mice would antagonize Claude in two more films: The Hypo-Chondri-Cat, released in 1950, featured Hubie and Bertie making Claude think he is sick with various ailments and, ultimately, that he has died. In 1951's Cheese Chasers, however, Hubie and Bertie inadvertently torment Claude when, after going overboard on a cheese raid and getting sick of their favorite food, they decide to commit suicide by trying to get Claude to eat them, but Claude thinks that they are poisonous and refuses, deciding to commit suicide as well by getting a bulldog to attack him but the bulldog gets confused.

After these seven cartoons, Jones retired Hubie and Bertie, but continued to use the characters (or mice resembling them) in cameo roles in other shorts whenever he needed a generic mouse for a gag, such as the unnamed mouse in Chow Hound, who resembles Bertie, or the "killer" mice in Scaredy Cat, who resemble Hubie.

== Filmography ==
- The Aristo Cat (1943)
- Trap Happy Porky (1945)
- Roughly Squeaking (1946)
- House Hunting Mice (1947)
- Mouse Wreckers (1949)
- The Hypo-Chondri-Cat (1950)
- Cheese Chasers (1951)

== Later appearances ==
Hubie and Bertie have made several cameos and recurring appearances in various Warner Bros. productions:

- Hubie and Bertie were going to have a cameo in the 1988 film Who Framed Roger Rabbit, but were later dropped for unknown reasons.
- They also appeared in Tiny Toon Adventures.
- Hubie and Bertie appear in The Sylvester & Tweety Mysteries. Just like in The Aristo-Cat, their colors have swapped until their appearances in Duck Dodgers.
- In the 1996 film Space Jam, Hubie and Bertie play the public address announcers during the basketball game where Michael Jordan and the Looney Tunes compete against the Monstars. Bertie's announcer voice was provided by Steve Kehela.
- Hubie and Bertie appear in the 2000 direct-to-video film Tweety's High-Flying Adventure.
- Hubie and Bertie appear in the Duck Dodgers episode "Too Close for Combat." They are hired by Queen Tyr'Ahnee and Martian Commander X-2 to break up Duck Dodgers and the Eager Young Space Cadet with their vocal impersonations of them. It nearly worked until Duck Dodgers and Cadet discovered them. They managed to persuade Hubie and Bertie into using their tricks on Queen Tyr'Ahnee and Martian Commander X-2.
- Hubie and Bertie briefly appear in The Looney Tunes Show opening.
- Hubie and Bertie appear in the New Looney Tunes segments "Appropriate Technology", "Daffy the Stowaway", "Tweet Team", "Darkbat", "Bonjour, Darkbat!", "Smoothie Operator".
- Hubie and Bertie have also appeared in some video games.
- Hubie is seen alone in the Bugs Bunny: Lost in Time level "The Carrot Factory".
- Both can be seen in the Space Jam video game.
- Hubie and Bertie made appearances in the HBO Max series Looney Tunes Cartoons starring in shorts such as "Happy Birthday, Bugs Bunny!" and "Frame the Feline".
- Female versions of Hubie and Bertie known as Ruthie and Gertie appeared in Bugs Bunny Builders, voiced by Kari Wahlgren and Candi Milo.
- Hubie and Bertie made a cameo appearance in the 2026 film Coyote vs. Acme.

== Home media ==
All of the Hubie and Bertie cartoons are available, remastered, on Looney Tunes Mouse Chronicles: The Chuck Jones Collection on DVD and Blu-Ray.
