= House Hunting Mice =

1947 film

- Directed by: Charles M. Jones
- Story by: Michael Maltese; Tedd Pierce
- Starring: Mel Blanc; Stan Freberg (uncredited)
- Music by: Carl Stalling
- Animation by: Lloyd Vaughan; Ken Harris; Phil Monroe; Ben Washam
- Layouts by: Robert Gribbroek
- Backgrounds by: Peter Alvarado
- Color process: Cinecolor (original issue); Technicolor (production, reissue)
- Production company: Warner Bros. Cartoons
- Distributed by: Warner Bros. Pictures; The Vitaphone Corporation
- Release date: September 6, 1947
- Running time: 7 minutes
- Language: English

House Hunting Mice is a 1947 American animated comedy short film directed by Chuck Jones and co-written by Michael Maltese and Tedd Pierce. The short was released on September 6, 1947 by Warner Bros. Pictures as part of the Looney Tunes series, and features Hubie and Bertie.

== Plot ==
The short begins outside a model "home of tomorrow" designed by Frank Lloyd Wrong, Hubie reads the advertisement and calls up Bertie's attention. In the hopes of finding a home with plenty of food, the mice head on up to the House to see what's inside. Upon entering, Hubie and Bertie are greeted by a robotic voice to the "Super House - The House of Tomorrow", and are encouraged to test out the modern appliances. Hubie first tests out an "Automatic Phonograph", which involved a robotic hand throwing a record at a rising phonograph player akin to that of a frisbee, and then an "Automatic Sweeper" demonstrator, which demonstrates a robot that can clean any mess on the floor. Bertie begs Hubie if he can press the next button, of which he allows while watching from a safe distance. However, the button Bertie pressed ends up activating a laundry contraption, which sucks Hubie in and have him go through several cleaning processes before getting folded and placed on a stack of clean clothes. As a result, Hubie slaps Bertie for putting him through that.

This is quickly forgotten, however, as Hubie notices another button labeled "Cheese Dispenser". Upon pressing it, the dispenser launches a piece of cheese into the floor, which causes the Sweeper robot to activate and discard it into a trash can. Bertie tries to catch the next cheese with a plate, but the plate shatters upon impact. The Sweeper returns to clean up the mess once again, this time throwing Bertie away as a result. Bertie tries to escape, but is thrown away again by the robot. Hubie tricks the Sweeper into jumping out of a window after throwing out a vase, but returns after Bertie answers the front door. He gets discarded once again.

Hubie comes to agree that if they want to have the cheese, they must get rid of the Sweeper first. Hubie drops a box of fire crackers and a lit candle into the floor for the Sweeper to discard. Bertie leaves the trash can again before the robot could discard them both. Upon doing so, it results in an explosion that destroys it. However, its hand was able to press a button labeled "Repair Service", which summons a repair bot that fixes it up completely. In a last ditch attempt, the two mice nailed the record player shut in the floor and uses the "Automatic Phonograph" to throw an onslaught of records against the wall. Unable to clean the mess at hand, the robot gets fed up, dons a coat and hat, picks up a briefcase, puts an "I Quit!" sign on its closet door, and leaves the house.

Hubie starts to revel in their victory over the Sweeper, but it is short-lived when Bertie spies a button labeled "Spring Cleaning Service" and presses it. This ends up summoning a whole army of Sweeper robots that come straight out of another closet and begin cleaning up the place. Hubie and Bertie try to escape the onslaught, but get caught up in a carpet being rolled up by one of the Sweepers and taken outside. In the cartoon's final scene, as the Sweepers begin the carpet beating process and whack the mice in the process, Hubie says "HEY, BOIT! C'MERE!" and starts repeatedly slapping Bertie for getting them into this recent mess.

== Home media ==
The short is included on Disc II of Looney Tunes Mouse Chronicles: The Chuck Jones Collection.
