= Paweł Domagała =

Polish actor and singer (born 1984)

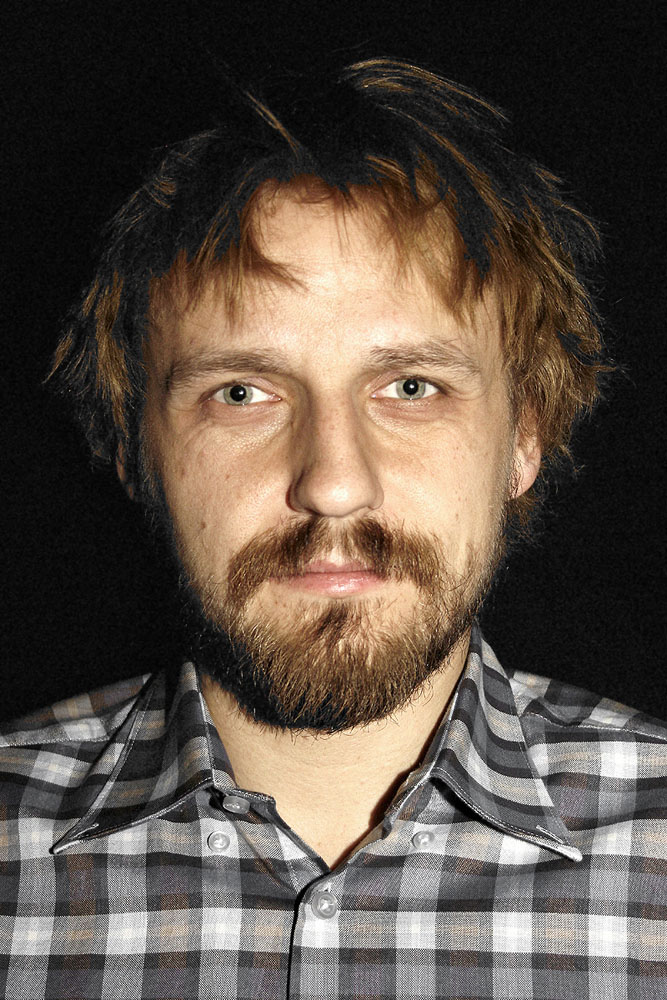
- Born: Paweł Domagała; 19 January 1984 (age 42); Wrocław, Poland
- Occupations: Actor; singer; songwriter
- Years active: 2002–present
- Spouse: Zuzanna Grabowska (m. 2013)

Paweł Domagała (born 19 January 1984) is a Polish actor in theater, film and television, and singer since 2016.

In 2014, Paweł Domagała appeared in the comedy film Wkręceni with Piotr Adamczyk and Bartosz Opania. He and Opania reprised their roles in the sequel Wkręceni 2.

== Filmography ==
Film
Year	Title	Role	Notes	Source
2014	Wkręceni	Szyja		
2015	Wkręceni 2	Szyja		
2016	Polish Legends: Operation Basilisc	Boguś Kołodziej	main role; short	

=== Stage ===
Year	Title	Role	Notes	Source
2011	Amazonia		Teatr na Woli	
2011	Matołek the Billy-Goat (Koziołek Matołek)	Matołek	Dramatyczny Theatre	
2013	EXTERMINATOR (EXTERMINATOR. Komedia muzyczna)	Marceli	Dramatyczny Theatre	

== Discography ==
=== Studio albums ===
Title	Album details	Peak chart positions	Certifications
Title	Album details	POL	Certifications
Opowiem ci o mnie	Released: 18 November 2016; Label: Domagała Borowiecki, Mystic Production; Format: CD, digital download, streaming	4	ZPAV: Platinum
1984	Released: 16 November 2018; Label: Domagała Borowiecki, Mystic Production; Format: CD, digital download, streaming	1	ZPAV: 4× Platinum
Wracaj	Released: 20 November 2020; Label: Domagała Borowiecki, Agora; Format: CD, digital download, streaming	3	ZPAV: Gold
Narnia	Released: 18 November 2022; Label: Domagała Borowiecki, Agora; Format: CD, digital download, streaming	3	
Hotelowe piosenki	Released: 23 May 2025; Label: Domagała Borowiecki, Agora; Format: CD, digital download, streaming	10	
Nadzieja	Released: 2027; Label: Domagała Borowiecki; Format: CD, digital download, streaming	To be released	

=== Singles ===
Title	Year	Peak chart positions	Certifications	Album
Title	Year	POL	Certifications	Album
"Jestem tego wart"	2016	—		Opowiem ci o mnie
"Gdybyś była"	2016	—		Opowiem ci o mnie
"Opowiem ci o mnie"	2017	—		Opowiem ci o mnie
"Jestem rewolucją"	2017	—		Non-album single
"25 grudnia"	2017	—		Opowiem ci o mnie
"Szczęście"	2018	—		Opowiem ci o mnie
"Weź nie pytaj"	2018	1	ZPAV: 3× Diamond	1984
"Wystarczę ja"	2018	1	ZPAV: 4× Platinum	1984
"Najgrubszy Anioł Stróż"	2018	—		1984
"Czasami"	2019	13		1984
"Nie zmarnuj mnie"	2019	—		1984
"Żmijowisko"	2019	23	ZPAV: Gold	Żmijowisko (soundtrack); Wracaj
"Obietnica"	2019	—		1984
"Ja tak umiem"	2020	—		Wracaj
"Popatrz na mnie"	2020	15		Wracaj
"Wracaj"	2020	—		Wracaj
"Synku mój"	2020	—		Wracaj
"Milcz"	2021	—		Na chwilę, na zawsze (soundtrack)
"Łe łe"	2021	81		Narnia
"Dzieci u dziadków"	2022	—		Narnia
"Po co ten krzyk"	2022	—		Narnia
"Rafi"	2023	—		Narnia
"Za późno"	2024	—		Hotelowe piosenki
"Tchórz"	2024	—		Hotelowe piosenki
"Ostatni raz"	2024	—		Hotelowe piosenki
"Murem"	2025	—		Hotelowe piosenki
"W tym mieście"	2025	—		Hotelowe piosenki
"Pies"	2025	—		Hotelowe piosenki
"Przyjdź kiedy chcesz"	2025	—		Hotelowe piosenki
"Okruchy złota" (with Marika)	2026	—		Non-album singles
"Nic tu po mnie"	2026	—		Non-album singles
"Miłość jest blind"	2026	—		Non-album singles
"Można oddychać pod wodą"	2026	—		Nadzieja
"—" denotes singles which failed to chart.

=== Guest appearances ===
Title	Year	Artist(s)	Album
"Powiedz mi czemu"	2019	KęKę	Mr KęKę
