= Cheese Chasers =

1951 film by Chuck Jones

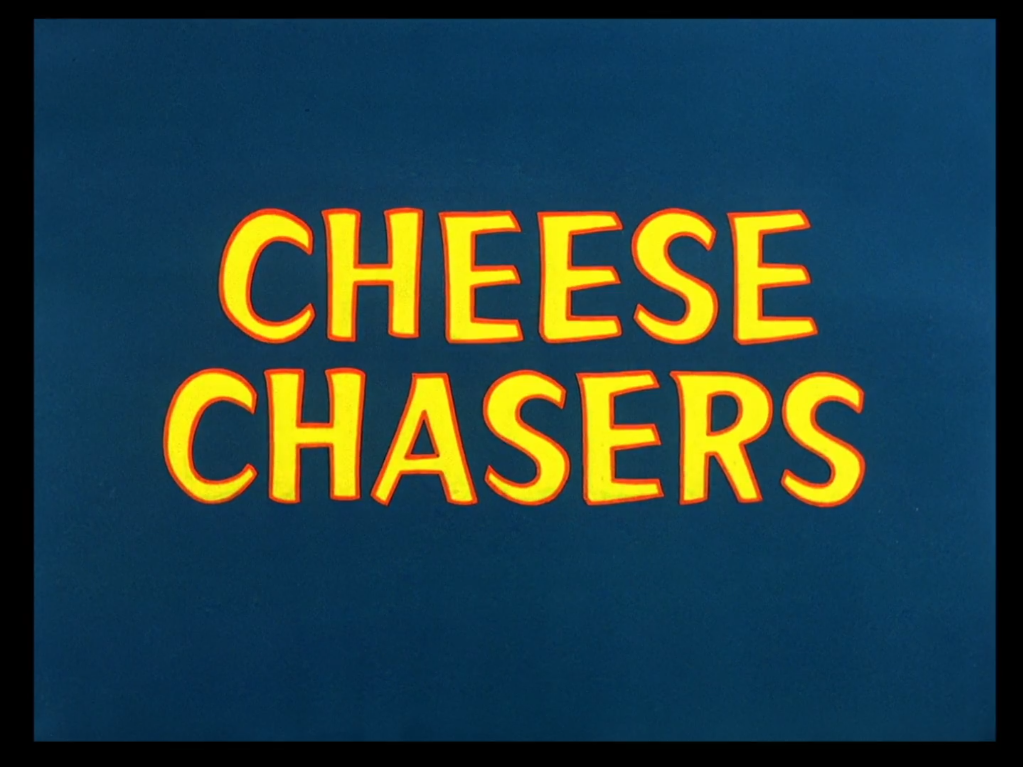
- Title card
- Directed by: Charles M. Jones
- Story by: Michael Maltese
- Starring: Mel Blanc
- Music by: Carl Stalling
- Animation by: Ken Harris; Ben Washam; Phil Monroe; Lloyd Vaughan
- Layouts by: Robert Gribbroek
- Backgrounds by: Philip DeGuard
- Color process: Technicolor
- Production company: Warner Bros. Cartoons
- Distributed by: Warner Bros. Pictures; The Vitaphone Corporation
- Release date: August 25, 1951
- Running time: 7 minutes 32 seconds
- Language: English

Cheese Chasers is a 1951 Warner Bros. Merrie Melodies cartoon directed by Chuck Jones and written by Michael Maltese. The cartoon was released on August 25, 1951 and stars Hubie and Bertie, in their final appearance in the golden age of American animation, with Claude Cat.

== Plot ==
At the end of a raid on The Hunka Cheese Co. (a cheese factory), Hubie and Bertie have eaten so much cheese, they are sick. They vow never to eat cheese again and, with nothing to live for, leave a suicide note. They walk to the house where Claude Cat lives, and march into his mouth as he sleeps. The cat wakes up, discovers the mice in his mouth, spits them out and, upon hearing them actually begging for him to eat them, feels something is amiss. Believing he is simply dreaming, Claude attempts to awaken by sticking himself with a pin. However, the mice persist, and Claude, realizing he is not dreaming, offers the mice some cheese so they will leave him alone. When the mice reject the cheese, Claude questions his sanity, ripping a page out of a mental illness book, folding it into a hat and posing like Napoleon.

Realizing they have to get tough with the cat, the mice corner Claude as he is working on a model ship as a hobby to "help him", and hit him in the foot with a hammer. Claude angrily and maniacally stuffs the mice in his mouth but catches himself and spits them out for fear of something dangerous happening. Claude escapes the mice and concludes he can never eat another mouse again; just like the mice, he determines he has nothing left to live for and becomes suicidal. Claude also leaves a note, heads outside and punches a bulldog in the front yard, who runs out of his doghouse barking in anger. He then looks back and sees Claude waiting for him, blindfolded and smoking a cigarette. Confronting Claude, he asks the cat why he doesn't run away as he is going to massacre him. Claude says he actually wants the dog to massacre him. The bulldog suspects something is "fishy," at which point the mice come running out of the house begging Claude to eat them, which he once more refuses, confusing the canine even more.

The bulldog asks Claude if cats eat mice, which he denies, and asks Hubie and Bertie if mice eat cheese, which they also deny. The bulldog, now totally flummoxed, attempts to figure things out by using an adding machine. Unfortunately, he realizes that "(i)t just don't add up!" and, having likely been driven crazy himself, chases after a passing dog catcher truck, begging the driver to wait for him to board, followed by Claude demanding the dog massacre him, and then by the mice taunting the cowardly cat to eat them.

== Censorship ==
When this cartoon aired on The WB, the part where Hubie and Bertie hit Claude's foot with a hammer in an attempt to be eaten by him was cut.

== Home media ==
- Looney Tunes Golden Collection: Volume 2 (DVD set)
- Looney Tunes Mouse Chronicles: The Chuck Jones Collection (Blu-ray/DVD set)
