= The Hypo-Chondri-Cat =

- Title card
- Directed by: Charles M. Jones
- Story by: Michael Maltese
- Starring: Mel Blanc
- Music by: Carl Stalling
- Animation by: Ben Washam; Lloyd Vaughan; Ken Harris; Phil Monroe
- Layouts by: Robert Gribbroek
- Backgrounds by: Phil DeGuard
- Color process: Technicolor
- Production company: Warner Bros. Cartoons
- Distributed by: Warner Bros. Pictures
- Release date: April 15, 1950 (U.S.)
- Running time: 7:19
- Language: English

The Hypo-Chondri-Cat is a 1950 Warner Bros. Merrie Melodies short directed by Chuck Jones and written by Michael Maltese. The cartoon was released on April 15, 1950 and stars Hubie and Bertie and Claude Cat. The title is a play on "hypochondriac".

== Plot ==
Hubie and Bertie take shelter in a house, but are shortly confronted by Claude Cat. He chases the two, but when he comes to an open window, a draft hits him and he is overtaken by his fear of catching a cold that could develop into pneumonia. He immediately grabs some pills and medicine. The mice see this as an opportunity to dispose of Claude. They trick him into thinking he is very sick, then they pretend to perform surgery on him. Claude faints and has a surreal dream involving illness and surgery. When he comes to, Hubie and Bertie convince him that he is dead and now a Heavenly angel. Then Hubie and Bertie send Claude floating unknowingly on a balloon, in a state of grace, to "cat Heaven", but despite him saying he can't fly, they shove him off the cliff. Claude does fly, but he doesn't realize that they tied a helium balloon to his back. "Farewell, you poor earthly creatures", says Claude to the mischievous rodents as he flies towards the Moon.

== Reception ==
Editor Harry McCracken writes, "Here's one cat and mouse cartoon where most of the violence is psychological — the botched "operation" and faked death that Hubie and Bertie put Claude through are practically Hitchcockian. The stages of grief that Claude goes through as he denies his own passing, gets panicky, and finally comes to accept it feature some of the best acting that Mel Blanc ever did."

== Home media ==
- DVD - Looney Tunes Golden Collection: Volume 1, Disc 3
- Blu-Ray/DVD - Looney Tunes Mouse Chronicles: The Chuck Jones Collection, Disc 2
