= The Aristo Cat =

1943 film by Charles M. Jones

- Directed by: Charles M. Jones
- Story by: Tedd Pierce
- Produced by: Leon Schlesinger
- Starring: Mel Blanc; Tedd Pierce; Michael Maltese
- Music by: Carl W. Stalling
- Animation by: Rudy Larriva
- Color process: Technicolor
- Production company: Leon Schlesinger Productions
- Distributed by: Warner Bros. Pictures
- Release date: June 19, 1943
- Running time: 6 minutes
- Country: United States
- Language: English

The Aristo Cat is a 1943 American animated comedy short film directed by Charles M. Jones. The short was released on June 19, 1943. It is part of the Merrie Melodies series and the first cartoon to feature Hubie and Bertie. It was re-released as a "Blue Ribbon" reissue in 1950 as The Aristo-Cat, rendering the original film and credits lost.

== Plot ==
Meadows, a butler is tired of the constant practical jokes of the family cat, Pussy, so much that he decides to quit his own job, leaving the cat home alone much to his chagrin. The cat doesn't know what a mouse looks like, so when Hubie and Bertie show up, he gets terrified.

Hubie and Bertie then decide to take advantage of the cat's unfamiliarity with mice by tricking him into believing that the family bulldog is the mouse he wants to eat. After a narrow escape from getting attacked by Rover, the cat eventually realizes that both Hubie and Bertie are the real mice, and starts giving them a chase to eat them. The chase leads back to the very same doghouse where a violent cat-and-dog fight ensues inside... until the main problem is revealed to be a bad dream.

== Availability ==
- VHS - Cartoon Moviestars: Porky Pig and Company
- LaserDisc - The Golden Age of Looney Tunes: Volume 1, Side 5: Chuck Jones
- VHS - The Golden Age of Looney Tunes: Volume 5: Chuck Jones
- VHS - Looney Tunes: The Collector's Edition: Volume 13: Comic Cat-Tastrophies (1995 Turner dubbed version)
- DVD - Looney Tunes Golden Collection: Volume 4, Disc 4 (restored)
- DVD - Looney Tunes: Spotlight Collection: Volume 4, Disc 2
- Blu-ray, DVD - Looney Tunes Mouse Chronicles: The Chuck Jones Collection, Disc 2 (restored)
- Streaming - HBO Max
