= 1949 in animation =

Events in 1949 in animation.

== Events ==
=== January ===
- January 15: Friz Freleng's Bugs Bunny and Elmer Fudd cartoon Hare Do premieres, produced by Warner Bros. Cartoons.
- January 22: Tex Avery's cartoon Bad Luck Blackie premieres, produced by MGM's Cartoon Studio and stars Blackie the Cat. It marks the debut of a prototypical version of Butch Dog.
- January 29: Chuck Jones' Porky Pig cartoon Awful Orphan premieres, produced by Warner Bros. Cartoons. Also starring Charlie Dog.
- January 30: The first episode of Adventures of Pow Wow is broadcast.

=== February ===
- February 11: Jack Hannah's Donald Duck cartoon Donald's Happy Birthday premieres, produced by Walt Disney Animation Studios. Also starring Huey, Dewey, and Louie.
- February 12: Arthur Davis' Porky Pig cartoon Porky Chops premieres, produced by Warner Bros. Cartoons.
- February 26:
  - William Hanna and Joseph Barbera's Tom and Jerry cartoon Polka-Dot Puss premieres, produced by MGM's Cartoon Studio and also starring Mammy Two Shoes. It is the first cartoon to use the classic Tom and Jerry theme music as its intro, composed by Scott Bradley.
  - Chuck Jones' Bugs Bunny cartoon Mississippi Hare premieres, produced by Warner Bros. Cartoons.

=== March ===
- March 12: Robert McKimson's Porky Pig cartoon Paying the Piper premieres, produced by Warner Bros. Cartoons.
- March 24: 21st Academy Awards: The Tom and Jerry cartoon The Little Orphan wins the Academy Award for Best Animated Short (just a month before the short premiered in theaters).
- March 26: Robert McKimson's Daffy Duck & Porky Pig cartoon Daffy Duck Hunt premieres, produced by Warner Bros. Cartoons. Also starring Barnyard Dawg.

=== April ===
- April 8: Jack Hannah's Donald Duck cartoon Sea Salts premieres, produced by Walt Disney Animation Studios.
- April 9:
  - Robert McKimson's Bugs Bunny cartoon Rebel Rabbit premieres, produced by Warner Bros. Cartoons.
  - Tex Avery's Droopy cartoon Señor Droopy premieres, produced by MGM's Cartoon Studio and also starring Slick McWolf. Droopy's name was revealed in this short.
- April 28: William Hanna and Joseph Barbera's Tom and Jerry cartoon Hatch Up Your Troubles premieres, produced by MGM's Cartoon Studio in which a baby woodpecker imprints on Jerry, believing that the mouse is his mother.
- April 30:
  - William Hanna and Joseph Barbera's Tom and Jerry cartoon The Little Orphan premieres, produced by MGM's Cartoon Studio and also starring Nibbles.
  - Friz Freleng's Bugs Bunny and Yosemite Sam cartoon High Diving Hare premieres, produced by Warner Bros. Cartoons.

=== May ===
- May 13: Dallas Bower's Alice in Wonderland premieres which has stop-motion sequences by Lou Bunin.
- May 21: Friz Freleng's Porky Pig cartoon Curtain Razor premieres, produced by Warner Bros. Cartoons.

=== June ===
- June 3: Jack Hannah's Donald Duck cartoon Winter Storage premieres, produced by Walt Disney Animation Studios. Also starring Chip 'n' Dale.
- June 4: Arthur Davis' first & only Bugs Bunny cartoon Bowery Bugs premieres, produced by Warner Bros. Cartoons.
- June 11:
  - Tex Avery's classic short The House of Tomorrow premieres, produced by MGM's Cartoon Studio.
  - Friz Freleng's cartoon Mouse Mazurka premieres, produced by Warner Bros. Cartoons. Starring Sylvester.
- June 16: William Hanna and Joseph Barbera's Tom and Jerry cartoon Heavenly Puss premieres, produced by MGM's Cartoon Studio. This reel gained notoriety during the theatrical release for its subjects of damnation in Hell. Despite its infamy upon the release, it became a cult classic and was later adapted into a video game in 2003.
- June 25: Chuck Jones' classic Bugs Bunny short Long-Haired Hare premieres, produced by Warner Bros. Cartoons.

=== July ===
- July 2: Robert McKimson's Foghorn Leghorn cartoon Henhouse Henery premieres, produced by Warner Bros. Cartoons. Also starring Henery Hawk & Barnyard Dawg. It is the first short in the series to use the song "Camptown Races" which became Foghorn's theme.
- July 16: Friz Freleng's Bugs Bunny cartoon Knights Must Fall premieres, produced by Warner Bros. Cartoons.
- July 23: Friz Freleng's third Tweety and Sylvester cartoon Bad Ol' Putty Tat premieres, produced by Warner Bros. Cartoons.
- July 30: Tex Avery’s Doggone Tired premieres, produced by MGM's Cartoon Studio.

=== August ===
- August 5: Jack Hannah's Donald Duck cartoon Honey Harvester premieres, produced by Walt Disney Animation Studios.
- August 6: Robert McKimson's Bugs Bunny cartoon The Grey Hounded Hare premieres, produced by Warner Bros. Cartoons.
- August 11: William Hanna and Joseph Barbera's Tom and Jerry cartoon The Cat and the Mermouse premieres, produced by MGM's Cartoon Studio.
- August 13:
  - Chuck Jones' Porky Pig cartoon Often an Orphan premieres, produced by Warner Bros. Cartoons. This is the final short where Porky gets paired up with Charlie Dog.
  - Tex Avery's Droopy cartoon Wags to Riches premieres, produced by MGM's Cartoon Studio. This short marks the official debut of the character Spike (who would later get renamed as Butch to avoid confusion with the Tom and Jerry character of the same name).
- August 27: Robert McKimson's Bugs Bunny cartoon The Windblown Hare premieres, produced by Warner Bros. Cartoons. Also starring The Big Bad Wolf and The Three Little Pigs.

=== September ===
- September 1: Crusader Rabbit becomes the first animated series directly made for television.
- September 2:
  - Jack Hannah's Donald Duck cartoon All in a Nutshell premieres, produced by Walt Disney Animation Studios. Also starring Chip 'n' Dale.
  - Friz Freleng's Porky Pig cartoon Dough for the Do-Do premieres, produced by Warner Bros. Cartoons. It is a colored remake of Bob Clampett's 1938 short Porky in Wackyland (with some elements from Clampett's 1943 short Tin Pan Alley Cats).
- September 9: William Hanna and Joseph Barbera's Tom and Jerry cartoon Love That Pup premieres, produced by MGM's Cartoon Studio. Also starring Spike the bulldog and the debut of his son Tyke.
- September 17:
  - Chuck Jones' Fast and Furry-ous premieres, produced by Warner Bros. Cartoons, which marks the debuts of Wile E. Coyote and the Road Runner.
  - Tex Avery's Little Rural Riding Hood premieres, produced by MGM's Cartoon Studio. This cartoon is a sequel Avery's previous short Red Hot Riding Hood (1943) and marks the final appearance of the titular character in the Golden Age of Animation. Also starring Slick McWolf.
- September 29: John Hubley's The Ragtime Bear premieres produced by UPA which marks the debut of Mr. Magoo

=== October ===
- October 5:
  - The Adventures of Ichabod and Mr. Toad, produced by the Walt Disney Company, premieres.
  - William Hanna and Joseph Barbera's Tom and Jerry cartoon Jerry's Diary premieres, produced by MGM's Cartoon Studio. The short features footage from the previous Tom and Jerry cartoons: Tee for Two, Mouse Trouble, Solid Serenade, and The Yankee Doodle Mouse.
- October 8:
  - Chuck Jones' Bugs Bunny cartoon Frigid Hare premieres, produced by Warner Bros. Cartoons.
  - Voice actor Mel Blanc loses a trial against animation producer Walter Lantz, whom he had sued for unauthorized use of his voice and laugh for the character Woody Woodpecker. Blanc had voiced the character in his three first cartoons, before Warner Brothers took an exclusivity contract on him. However, Lantz had kept using audio recordings of Woody's laugh and had other actors imitate the voice. The judge rules that Blanc has no case since he did not copyright Woody's voice. However, Lantz does settle the case out of court and pays him some compensation afterwards.
- October 14: Jack Hannah's Donald Duck cartoon The Greener Yard premieres, produced by Walt Disney Animation Studios.
- October 22: Arthur Davis' Porky Pig cartoon Bye, Bye Bluebeard premieres, produced by Warner Bros. Cartoons. This was Davis' last short for Warner Bros. until he returned 12–13 years later to direct the Daffy Duck cartoon Quackodile Tears.

=== November ===
- November 5: Tex Avery's Droopy cartoon Out Foxed premieres, produced by MGM's Cartoon Studio.
- November 12: Chuck Jones' Pepé Le Pew cartoon For Scent-imental Reasons premieres, produced by Warner Bros. Cartoons which marks the debut of Pepé's long term significant other Penelope Pussycat.
- November 18: William Hanna and Joseph Barbera's Tom and Jerry cartoon Tennis Chumps premieres, produced by MGM's Cartoon Studio and also starring Butch.
- November 19: Robert McKimson's cartoon Hippety Hopper premieres, produced by Warner Bros. Cartoons. Starring Sylvester and the titular character Hippety Hopper.
- November 25: Jack Hannah's Donald Duck cartoon Slide, Donald, Slide premieres, produced by Walt Disney Animation Studios.

=== December ===
- December 3: Friz Freleng's Bugs Bunny cartoon Which Is Witch premieres, produced by Warner Bros. Cartoons. This short has never been re-released due to its negative depictions of African-Americans.
- December 16: Jack Hannah's Donald Duck cartoon Toy Tinkers premieres, produced by Walt Disney Animation Studios. Also starring Chip 'n' Dale.
- December 24:
  - Chuck Jones' Bugs Bunny cartoon Rabbit Hood premieres, produced by Warner Bros. Cartoons.
  - Tex Avery's The Counterfeit Cat premieres, produced by MGM's Cartoon Studio, starring Blackie the Cat and Spike.

=== Specific date unknown ===
- Karel Zeman's Inspiration premieres.

== Films released ==
- April 15 - The Emperor's Nightingale (Czechoslovakia)
- May 13 - Alice in Wonderland (France)
- August 22 - The Dynamite Brothers (Italy)
- October 5 - The Adventures of Ichabod and Mr. Toad (United States)
- December 22 - The Singing Princess (Italy)
- December 26 - Adventures of Esparadrapo (Spain)

== Television series debuts ==
- January 30 - Adventures of Pow Wow debuts on WNBT-TV.
- August 1 - Crusader Rabbit debuts in syndication.
- September - Jim and Judy in Teleland debuts in syndication.

== Births ==
=== January ===
- January 1: Daniel Goldberg, Canadian producer and screenwriter (Space Jam, Heavy Metal, Mummies Alive!, Extreme Ghostbusters, Alienators: Evolution Continues), (d. 2023).
- January 7: George Buza, Canadian actor (voice of Beast in X-Men: The Animated Series and X-Men '97, Grandpa Fantootsie in Franny's Feet, Chief Chirpa in Ewoks).
- January 10:
  - George Foreman, American boxer (voice of George Fisticuff in the Garfield and Friends episode "Food Fighters", himself in the King of the Hill episode "Boxing Luanne"), (d. 2025).
  - Thomas Chase Jones, American composer (Mister T, Disney Television Animation, Bionic Six, Visionaries: Knights of the Magical Light, DIC Entertainment, Little Nemo: Adventures in Slumberland, A Wish for Wings That Work, Hanna-Barbera, Captain Simian & the Space Monkeys, Salty's Lighthouse, The New Woody Woodpecker Show, ChalkZone, Warner Bros. Animation).
- January 26: David Strathairn, American actor (voice of Milton Lynxley in Zootopia 2, the title character in the Axe Cop episode "Night Mission: The Extincter", Chet in the Fairfax episode "Chernobylfest").

=== February ===
- February 2: Brent Spiner, American actor (voice of Puck in Gargoyles, Conan O'Brien in South Park: Bigger, Longer and Uncut, Dr. Gabriel Rylander in Generator Rex, Joker in Young Justice, Coach Mackey in Quantum Quest: A Cassini Space Odyssey, Dr. Noonien Soong, Gondola Jack, and Medic in Robot Chicken, Gall Trayvis in Star Wars Rebels, Silver Surfer in the Hulk and the Agents of S.M.A.S.H. episode "Fear Itself", Riddler in the Justice League Action episode "E. Nigma, Consulting Detective", Purple Man in The Avengers: Earth's Mightiest Heroes episode "Emperor Stark", Robots in The Simpsons episode "Them, Robot", himself in the Family Guy episode "Not All Dogs Go to Heaven").
- February 5: Bill Steinkellner, American screenwriter (The Lion King 1½, co-creator of Teacher's Pet).
- February 8: John Swartzwelder, American novelist and screenwriter (The Simpsons).
- February 9: Judith Light, American actress (voice of Zuleika in Joseph: King of Dreams, Mrs. Wright in the Penn Zero: Part-Time Hero episode "My Mischievous Son", herself in the Family Guy episode "The Griffin Family History").
- February 10: Valri Bromfield, Canadian actress and comedienne (voice of Mary Hartless in Tiny Toon Adventures and Animaniacs, Molly in Camp Candy).
- February 18: Pat Fraley, American actor (voice of Krang, Casey Jones and Baxter Stockman in Teenage Mutant Ninja Turtles, Denver in Denver, the Last Dinosaur, Tuffy Smurf in The Smurfs, Mad Rabbid in Rabbids Invasion, Doughy Bunnington in Hanazuki: Full of Treasures, Ken Sparks in ChalkZone, Gwumpki in Quack Pack, Marshal Moo Montana in Wild West C.O.W.-Boys of Moo Mesa, Cousin Itt in The Addams Family, Wildcat in TaleSpin, Fireball in Saber Rider and the Star Sheriffs, the title character in BraveStarr, Max Ray in The Centurions, Eddie in Turbo Teen, Major Talbot in The Incredible Hulk, Bat-Mite in the Batman: The Animated Series episode "Deep Freeze", Karl in the What's New, Scooby-Doo? episode "Fright House of a Lighthouse", Gombo in The Legend of Korra episode "The Earth Queen", Beta Ray Bill in The Super Hero Squad Show episode "The Ballad of Beta Ray Bill!", Lance Thruster in The Fairly OddParents episode "Crash Nebula", Kublai Khan in the Time Squad episode "Kublai Khan't", Santa Claus in the My Life as a Teenage Robot episode "A Robot For All Seasons").
- February 19: Andy Heyward, American television producer, writer (Hanna-Barbera) and businessman (founder of Genius Brands, co-founder of DIC Entertainment).
- February 21: Larry Drake, American actor and comedian (voice of Pops in Johnny Bravo, Ganthet in Green Lantern: First Flight, Jackson Chappell in the Batman Beyond episode "The Winning Edge", Colonel Vox in the Justice League episode "Maid of Honor", Moss Meister in the What's New, Scooby-Doo? episode "Recipe for Disaster), (d. 2016).
- February 23: Judy Munsen, American composer (Peanuts).

=== March ===
- March 2: Gates McFadden, American actress and choreographer (voice of Beverly Crusher in the Star Trek: Prodigy episode "Kobayashi", Queen Marlena in Masters of the Universe: Revolution, Mother Askani in X-Men '97, herself in the Family Guy episode "Not All Dogs Go to Heaven").
- March 4: Norbert Lemire, Canadian painter and animator (Princess Sissi), (d. 2025).
- March 16: Victor Garber, Canadian actor (voice of Sinestro in Green Lantern: First Flight, Master Thundering Rhino in Kung Fu Panda 2, Sabino in Wish, James Sr. in the Spirit Riding Free episode "Lucky and the Train Tycoon", Michael de Graff in The Simpsons episode "Portrait of a Lackey on Fire").
- March 17: Patrick Duffy, American actor (voice of Harold Hatchback in the Goof Troop episode "Buddy Building", Steve Trevor in the Justice League episode "The Savage Time").
- March 21: Eddie Money, American singer and songwriter (performed the theme song of Quack Pack, composed the tracks "Baby Hold On" which was used in the Bob's Burgers episode "O.T.: The Outside Toilet", and "Two Tickets to Paradise" which was used in The Simpsons episode "Homer Loves Flanders", and the King of the Hill episode "Enrique-cilable Differences"), (d. 2019).
- March 30: Ray Magliozzi, American radio host (voice of Clack Tappet in the Arthur episode "Pick a Car, Any Car", and Click and Clack's As the Wrench Turns, Dusty Rust-eze in Cars and Cars 3) and television writer (Click and Clack's As the Wrench Turns).

=== April ===
- April 1: Dominique Collignon-Maurin, French actor (voice of Spartakus in Spartakus and the Sun Beneath the Sea, Transformer in Gandahar, French dub voice of Hades in Hercules, Randall Boggs in Monsters, Inc., Wart in The Sword in the Stone, Gill in Finding Nemo, Rat in Fantastic Mr. Fox, Mandrake in Epic), (d. 2025).
- April 2:
  - Pamela Reed, American actress (voice of Ruth Powers in The Simpsons, Jay's No. 1 Fan in The Critic episode "Miserable").
  - Ron Palillo, American actor (voice of Rubik in Rubik, the Amazing Cube, Sgt. Squealy in Laverne & Shirley in the Army, Scrounger in Pound Puppies, Ordinary Guy in the Darkwing Duck episode "Planet of the Capes", himself in the Duckman episode "Westward, No!"), (d. 2012).
- April 6: Tonino Accolla, Italian actor (dub voice of Homer Simpson in The Simpsons), (d. 2013).
- April 20: Veronica Cartwright, English-American actress (voice of Ms. Dominic in Kick Buttowski: Suburban Daredevil, Sue in The Loud House episode "The Old and the Restless").
- April 21: Patti LuPone, American actress and singer (voice of Yellow Diamond in the Steven Universe franchise, Nanpire in Vampirina, Roberta McCullough in Central Park, Nora Murphy in F is for Family, Cheryl Monroe in The Simpsons episode "The Girl on the Bus").
- April 24: Jim White, American voice actor (voice of Haredas in One Piece, the Narrator and Igneel in Fairy Tail, Marco in Fairy Gone, Zeke's Grandpa in Attack on Titan), (d. 2022).
- April 25: Augstí Ascensio Saurí, Spanish animator and comics artist (El mago de los sueños), (d. 1994).

=== May ===
- May 9: Billy Joel, American musician (voice of Dodger in Oliver & Company).
- May 10: Phil Baron, American actor, voice actor, puppeteer, composer, lyricist, writer, author, signer and songwriter (voice of the title character in The Adventures of Teddy Ruxpin).
- May 20: Dave Thomas, Canadian actor, comedian and television writer (voice of Tuke in Brother Bear and Brother Bear 2, Doug McKenzie in Bob & Doug, Thunder-Karlsson in Pippi Longstocking, Lane Pratley in King of the Hill, Hugo in The Legend of Tarzan, Mr. Czelanski in Mission Hill, Harv Hickman and Ernst in Justice League, Agent Todd in Pound Puppies, Cleve Kelso in Fast & Furious Spy Racers, Rex Banner in The Simpsons episode "Homer vs. the Eighteenth Amendment", Pig Dad in the Nightmare Ned episode "Canadian Bacon", Tad Venom in the Duckman episode "The Longest Weekend", co-creator of Bob & Doug and Popzilla).
- May 21: Will Ryan, American actor, singer and musician (voice of Petrie in The Land Before Time, Stuey in Rock-a-Doodle, Royal and Tika in The Pebble and the Penguin, Scrooge McDuck in Sport Goofy in Soccermania, Grubby in The Adventures of Teddy Ruxpin, The Seahorse Herald in The Little Mermaid, Papa Bear in Looney Tunes: Back in Action, the title characters in the Courage the Cowardly Dog episode "The Duck Brothers", various characters in Hi Hi Puffy AmiYumi, continued voice of Willie the Giant and Pete), (d. 2021).
- May 23: Barry Marder, American screenwriter (Bee Movie), and actor (voice of Waterbug in Bee Movie), (d. 2026).
- May 24: Jim Broadbent, English actor (voice of Santa Claus in Arthur Christmas, Madame Gasket in Robots, Doctor Dee in Mary and the Witch's Flower).
- May 25: Yuki Katsuragi, Japanese singer (performed an insert song in Space Dandy and the theme songs for Goku Midnight Eye and Gon, the Little Fox), (d. 2022).
- May 26:
  - Hank Williams Jr., American singer-songwriter and musician (singing voice of Injurin' Joe in Tom Sawyer, performed the song "Canyonero" in The Simpsons episodes "The Last Temptation of Krust" and "Marge Simpson in: "Screaming Yellow Honkers"").
  - Arlene Klasky, American animator, graphic designer and producer (co-founder of Klasky Csupo).
  - Pam Grier, American actress (voice of Julie Auburn in the Pinky and the Brain episode "Inherit the Wheeze", the title character in the Happily Ever After: Fairy Tales for Every Child episode "The Empress' Nightingale", My'ria'h in the Justice League episode "A Knight of Shadows").
- May 27: Jo Ann Harris, American actress (voice of Tina in Goober and the Ghost Chasers, Richard, Lewis and other various characters in The Simpsons, Felicia in What-a-Mess).
- May 29: Robert Axelrod, American actor (voice of Lord Zedd and Finster in Mighty Morphin Power Rangers, Microchip in Spider-Man, Wizardmon and Vademon in Digimon: Digital Monsters), (d. 2019).

=== June ===
- June 10: Kevin Corcoran, American actor (voice of the title character in Goliath II, Goofy Jr. in Aquamania), (d. 2015).
- June 11: Sherman Howard, American actor (voice of Derek Powers/Blight in Batman Beyond, the Preserver and Steppenwolf in Superman: The Animated Series, Van Pelt in Jumanji, Buzzard in Men in Black: The Series, Police Chief McBrusque and Haggis in the An American Tail franchise, Oog-Oh in the Invader Zim episode "Planet Jackers", Captain Horoth in The Mummy episode "Time Before Time").
- June 15: Jim Varney, American actor and comedian (voice of Slinky Dog in Toy Story and Toy Story 2, Cookie in Atlantis: The Lost Empire, Mr. Gus Holder in Annabelle's Wish, Walt Evergreen in the Duckman episode "You've Come a Wrong Way, Baby", Cooder in The Simpsons episode "Bart Carny", Ephialtes in the Hercules episode "Hercules and the Muse of Dance"), (d. 2000).
- June 22:
  - Meryl Streep, American actress (voice of Mrs. Fox in Fantastic Mr. Fox, Queen Ant in The Ant Bully, Jessica Lovejoy in The Simpsons episode "Bart's Girlfriend", Insect Queen in Hoppers).
  - Alan Osmond, American singer and musician (voiced himself in The Osmonds), (d. 2026).
- June 25: Kene Holliday, American actor (voice of Roadblock in G.I. Joe: A Real American Hero and G.I. Joe: The Movie).
- June 27: Steve Rucker, American composer (Mister T, Disney Television Animation, Hanna-Barbera, Bionic Six, Visionaries: Knights of the Magical Light, DIC Entertainment, Little Nemo: Adventures in Slumberland, A Wish for Wings That Work, Dexter's Laboratory, The Powerpuff Girls, Codename: Kids Next Door, Captain Simian & the Space Monkeys, Salty's Lighthouse, Detention, ChalkZone).
- June 29:
  - Roger Allers, American director (The Lion King, Open Season, The Prophet), screenwriter (The Emperor's New Groove, Brother Bear, Aladdin, Beauty and the Beast, The Lion King 1½, The Little Matchgirl,) and animator (Rock & Rule, Animalympics, Open Season, The Little Mermaid, Little Nemo: Adventures in Slumberland), (d. 2026).
  - Greg Burson, American actor (voice of Mr. DNA in Jurassic Park, voice replacement for all characters performed by Mel Blanc and Daws Butler), (d. 2008).
- Specific date unknown: Sally Cruikshank, American cartoonist, animator (Sesame Street, Quasi at the Quackadero), storyboard artist (SpongeBob SquarePants) and director (Quasi at the Quackadero).

=== July ===
- July 5: Ed O'Ross, American actor (voice of Agent K in Men in Black: The Series, Ivan in Curious George, Raskov in the Teen Titans episode "Snowblind", Tobias Manning in the Justice League Unlimited episode "The Once and Future Thing, Part One: Weird Western Tales").
- July 7: Shelley Duvall, American actress (voice of Ocka in the Aaahh!!! Real Monsters episode "Oblina Without a Cause", Fairy in the Adventures from the Book of Virtues episode "Perseverance"), (d. 2024).
- July 11: Hudson Talbott, American author and animator (We're Back! A Dinosaur's Story), (d. 2026).
- July 12: Judy Freudberg, American screenwriter (Sesame Street, An American Tail, The Land Before Time, Between the Lions), (d. 2012).
- July 14: Shirley Jo Finney, American actress and stage director (voice of Chaplin in Hey Good Lookin'), (d. 2023).
- July 22: Alan Menken, American composer, songwriter, conductor, music director and record director (Walt Disney Animation Studios).
- July 24: Michael Richards, American actor and comedian (voice of Bud Ditchwater in Bee Movie).
- July 29: Leslie Easterbrook, American actress (voice of Mala in the Superman: The Animated Series episode "Blasts from the Past", Randa Duane in the Batman: The Animated Series episode "Heart of Steel").

=== August ===
- August 9: Don Vanderbeek, American background artist (Metro-Goldwyn-Mayer Animation, Johnny Bravo, Globehunters: An Around the World in 80 Days Adventure, Make Way for Noddy, Eight Crazy Nights, Candy Land: The Great Lollipop Adventure, The Simpsons), (d. 2014).
- August 16: Barbara Goodson, American actress (voice of Red Fraggle in Fraggle Rock: The Animated Series, Naota Nandaba in FLCL, Mother Talzin in Star Wars: The Clone Wars, Marianne Lenoir in Miraculous: Tales of Ladybug & Cat Noir, Goku in the Harmony Gold dub of Dragon Ball).
- August 18: Takeshi Shudo, Japanese scriptwriter and novelist (Pokémon), (d. 2010).
- August 21: Loretta Devine, American actress (voice of Hallie in Doc McStuffins, Muriel Stubbs in The PJs, Gayle McBride in The Loud House, Wanda in Eureka!, Shirley in The Cleveland Show episode "Mama Drama").
- August 23:
  - Miyuki Ichijō, Japanese voice actress (voice of Jodie Sterling in Case Closed, Ouhi in Slayers, Encia in The Vision of Escaflowne, Howmei in Martian Successor Nadesico, Anastasia in Cowboy Bebop, Melissa Fraser in The Big O, Japanese dub voice of Marge Simpson in The Simpsons, Queen Titania in Rainbow Magic), (d. 2023).
  - Shelley Long, American actress and comedian (voice of Grandma Murphy in Milo Murphy's Law, Sally Tubbs in the Life with Louie episode "A Fair to Remember", Carol Brady in the American Dad! episode "Excellence in Broadcasting").
  - Rick Springfield, Australian-American musician and actor (voice of Andy in the Johnny Bravo episode "Beach Blanket Bravo", Bobby Bastille in the Duncanville episode "Jack's Pipe Dream", himself in Mission: Magic, and the Family Guy episode "Chap Stewie").
- August 25: Gene Simmons, Israeli-American musician, singer and songwriter (voiced himself in Action League Now!, Family Guy, Glenn Martin DDS, The Fairly OddParents, and Scooby-Doo! and Kiss: Rock and Roll Mystery, Jessie in the King of the Hill episode "Reborn to Be Wild", Sea Monster in the SpongeBob SquarePants episode "20,000 Patties Under the Sea", creator of My Dad the Rock Star).
- August 28: Charles Rocket, American actor, comedian, musician and television reporter (voice of Leo Lionheart Jr. in MGM sing-along videos, Firrikash in Titan A.E., Mission Control 1961 in Fly Me to the Moon, narrator in Yu-Gi-Oh! The Movie: Pyramid of Light, Frederick Fournier in The New Batman Adventures episode "Mean Seasons", Oil Slick Monster in The Adventures of Hyperman episode "Oceans a Leavin'", Crewcut in the Static Shock episode "She-Bang"), (d. 2005).
- August 30: Christopher Collins, American actor (voice of Starscream in The Transformers, Cobra Commander in G.I. Joe: A Real American Hero, Mr. Burns and Moe Szyslak in season 1 of The Simpsons), (d. 1994).
- August 31: Richard Gere, American actor (voice of Henry in Henry & Me, himself in The Simpsons episode "She of Little Faith").

=== September ===
- September 12: Guy Paul, American actor (additional voices in Courage the Cowardly Dog).
- September 16: Ed Begley Jr., American actor and environmentalist (voice of Donald Todd in Static Shock, Barry Brittle in the Duckman episode "Research and Destroy", Charlie Collins in the Batman: The Animated Series episode "Joker's Favor", Dr. Corso in the Batman Beyond episode "April Moon", himself in The Replacements episode "Dick Daring's All-Star Holiday Stunt Spectacular").
- September 19: Ernie Sabella, American actor (voice of Pumbaa in The Lion King franchise and House of Mouse).
- September 21: Irene Mecchi, American screenwriter (Walt Disney Animation Studios, Brave, Strange Magic).
- September 28:
  - Jim Henshaw, Canadian actor, screenwriter, and film and television producer (voice of Tenderheart Bear and Bright Heart Raccoon in Care Bears, Wicket W. Warrick in Ewoks).
  - Vernee Watson-Johnson, American actress (voice of Dee Dee Sykes in Captain Caveman and the Teen Angels, Mrs. Watkins in Static Shock, Head Nurse in The Ant Bully, Lorraine Tate in Batman Beyond, Evelyn in the Craig of the Creek episode "Capture the Flag Part 1: The Candy", Lorna Freeman in The Boondocks episode "Invasion of the Katrinians", Selma in the A Pup Named Scooby-Doo episode "The Schnook Who Took My Comic Book").

=== October ===
- October 3: Norm Abram, American carpenter, writer and television host (guest starred in the Fetch! with Ruff Ruffman episode "This Old...Lemonade Stand", voiced himself in the Freakazoid! episode "Normadeus").
- October 4: Armand Assante, American actor (voice of Tzekal-Kan in The Road to El Dorado).
- October 8: Sigourney Weaver, American actress (voice of Frieda in Happily N'Ever After, Axiom Computer in WALL-E, the Narrator in The Tale of Despereaux, Lady Starblaster in Penn Zero: Part-Time Hero, The Myth Speaker in The Dark Crystal: Age of Resistance episode "End. Begin. All the Same.", Female Planet Express Ship in the Futurama episode "Love and Rocket", herself in Finding Dory).
- October 11: Sharman DiVono, American television writer (Richie Rich, Star Wars: Droids, G.I. Joe: A Real American Hero, Popples, DuckTales, Garfield and Friends, Bill & Ted's Excellent Adventures).
- October 15: George Fenton, English composer (Valiant), (d. 2026).George Fenton, English composer (Valiant), dies at age 76.
- October 25:
  - Ross Bagdasarian Jr., American cartoonist, animator, actor, writer, producer and director, and son of Ross Bagdasarian, (Alvin and the Chipmunks).
  - Bill Kovacs, American animator (Tron), (d. 2006).
- October 26: David Isaacs, American television producer and writer (The Simpsons).

=== November ===
- November 5: Armin Shimerman, American actor (voice of General Skarr in Evil Con Carne and The Grim Adventures of Billy & Mandy, Zilius Zox in Justice League Action, Calculator in Batman: The Brave and the Bold, Slix Vigma in the Ben 10 episode "Grudge Match", Quark in the Star Trek: Lower Decks episode "Hear All, Trust Nothing").
- November 6: Elwood Edwards, American voice actor (voice of Virtual Doctor in The Simpsons episode "Little Big Mom"), (d. 2024).
- November 7: Judy Tenuta, American actress, comedian and musician (voice of Edna in Duckman, Black Widow in Space Ghost Coast to Coast, Mermaid, Waterskiing Babe, Black Widow and Waitress in Johnny Bravo, Tooth Fairy in the Nightmare Ned episode "Tooth or Consequences", Kelly in the Cow and Chicken episode "Buffalo Gals", Empanada in the Chowder episode "Mahjongg Night", Queen Porcina in the Mighty Magiswords episode "The Mystery of Loch Mess", herself in the Dr. Katz, Professional Therapist episode "Sticky Notes"), (d. 2022).
- November 27: Gerrit Graham, American actor (voice of Cat R. Waul in Fievel's American Tails, Franklin Sherman in The Critic, Guardian in Gargoyles, Milo in The Tick episode "Armless But Not Harmless") and screenwriter (Oliver & Company, The Little Mermaid, The Prince and the Pauper), (d. 2026).
- November 28: Paul Shaffer, Canadian musician, actor, and comedian (voice of Hermes in the Hercules franchise and House of Mouse).
- November 29: Garry Shandling, American actor and comedian (voice of Verne in Over the Hedge, Ikki in The Jungle Book, Garry in the Dr. Katz, Professional Therapist episode "Sticky Notes", Captain Pat Lewellen in the Tom Goes to the Mayor episode "Couple's Therapy"), (d. 2016).

=== December ===
- December 4: Jeff Bridges, American actor (voice of Prince Lir in The Last Unicorn, Ezekiel 'Big Z' Topanga/Geek in Surf's Up, the Aviator in The Little Prince).
- December 5: Pamela Blair, American actress (voice of Flight Attendant and White House Tour Guide in Beavis and Butt-Head Do America), (d. 2023).
- December 7: Jymn Magon, American television writer (Disney Television Animation).
- December 9: Tom Kite, American professional golfer and golf course architect (voiced himself in The Simpsons episode "Scenes from the Class Struggle in Springfield").
- December 12: Bill Nighy, English actor (voice of Whitey in Flushed Away, Rattlesnake Jake in Rango, Santa Claus in Arthur Christmas, Socrates in Norm of the North).
- December 15: Don Johnson, American actor, producer and singer (voice of Falcon in G.I. Joe: The Movie, Grandpa Whitey in Glenn Martin, DDS, Mr. McCormick in the American Dad! episode "Don't Look a Smith Horse in the Mouth", Johnny Bahama in the TripTank episode "The Director").
- December 18: Jeffrey Price, American screenwriter and producer (Who Framed Roger Rabbit, Shrek the Third).
- December 21: Michael Horse, American actor (voice of Quanna Parker in The Legend of Calamity Jane, Little Creek's Friend in Spirit: Stallion of the Cimarron, J.R. in Wild West C.O.W.-Boys of Moo Mesa, Carlos Maza in Gargoyles, Sam Rainwater in The Wild Thornberrys episode "Pack of Thornberrys", Leon Strongfeather in the What's New, Scooby-Doo? episode "New Mexico, Old Monster", Holling Longshadow in the Young Justice episode "Beneath", Ubu and Professor Black Wing in the Superman: The Animated Series episode "The Demon Reborn").
- December 23: Judy Strangis, American actress (voice of Groovia in The Roman Holidays, Merilee in Butch Cassidy, Rota Ree in Wheelie and the Chopper Bunch, Pauline in the Donkey Kong segment of Saturday Supercade).
- December 24: Ray Colcord, American composer (The Simpsons episode "Dead Putting Society"), (d. 2016).

=== Specific date unknown ===
- Tom Snyder, American animator, writer and producer (Dr. Katz, Professional Therapist, Science Court).
- Yoshiko Miura, Japanese lyricist (wrote the theme song for Megazone 23), (d. 2023).
- Christopher Vogler, American executive, screenwriter, and author and educator (The Lion King).

== Deaths ==
=== March ===
- March 6: Storm P., Danish comics artist, animator, illustrator, painter and comedian (Tre små mænd), dies at age 66.

=== October ===
- October 1: Buddy Clark, American singer (singer and narrator in Melody Time), dies at age 37.

=== December ===
- December 25: Leon Schlesinger, American film producer (Warner Bros. Cartoons), dies at age 65.

== See also ==
- List of anime by release date (1946–1959)
