= Shot-for-shot =

Almost-identical re-creation of an existing visual work

Shot-for-shot (or shot-for-shot adaptation, shot-for-shot remake) is a way to describe a visual work based on an existing work that is transferred almost completely identically from the original work without much interpretation.

== Production uses ==
In the film industry, most screenplays are adapted into a storyboard by the director or storyboard artists to visually represent the director's vision for each shot, so that the crew can understand what is being aimed for.

== Examples ==
=== From comics to film ===
- Sin City: Directors Robert Rodriguez and Frank Miller filmed most scenes shot-for-shot from Miller's graphic novels.
- 300: Director Zack Snyder photocopied the graphic novel and constructed the preceding and succeeding shots.
- Watchmen: Zack Snyder again used the graphic novel as his main storyboard, featuring several shots that are almost identical to their literary counterparts.

=== From comics to television ===
- The Adventures of Tintin comic series was adapted into an animated series of the same name, often with many of the panels from the original comic transposed directly to the television screen.
- The Marvel Super Heroes animated series used extremely limited animation produced by xerography, consisting of photocopied images taken directly from the comics and manipulated to minimize the need for animation production.
- The Maxx: Sam Kieth and William Messner-Loebs' Image Comics series was adapted in an animated television series by Rough Draft Studios and MTV in 1995. According to Richard Mathes of TubeWad, the animated adaptation follows the comic book art almost line for line. The producers decided to use animation that was almost identical to the panels within the Image comics instead of the "cartoony" dark tone of the comics, and the animators animated as little as possible.

Many Japanese anime series that are based on a preceding manga series strive to adapt the story without many changes. One example of this is Monster, which besides adding animation, music and shuffling around some scenes, is a perfect recreation of the source material. If the anime and manga are being produced concurrently, however, and should the anime overtake the release of new source material, the producers might then be forced to create their own new ending to the story, go on hiatus, or create a "filler arc" with an original story arc that non-canonically continues the story until more material has been created.

=== Film to film ===
Some films are remade in an almost identical "frame-to-frame" fashion:

- Alfred Hitchcock's black-and-white Psycho was remade by Gus Van Sant as nearly a shot for shot remake, with different actors.
- The 1952 color version of The Prisoner of Zenda went so far as to use the same shooting script as the 1937 black-and-white adaptation.
- Amateur filmmakers Eric Zala, Chris Strompolos, and Jayson Lamb created a shot-for-shot adaptation of Steven Spielberg's Raiders of the Lost Ark during their youth in the 1980s, titled Raiders of the Lost Ark: The Adaptation. The film was unearthed and championed years later by filmmaker Eli Roth; a film about the boys' creation of the film was made in 2015.
- Michael Haneke's 2007 film Funny Games is a remake of his own 1997 film by the same title, albeit with a mostly American crew and actors instead of the original German/Austrian.
- John Erick Dowdle's 2008 film Quarantine is a remake of the Spanish film REC; like Funny Games, the remake is almost identical (except the musical score and some elements from the original have been omitted) and features an American crew and actors instead of the original Spanish.
- Star Wars Uncut is an online fan-remake of Star Wars, which consist of close to 500 fifteen-second shot-for-shot segments created and submitted from a variety of participants. The sequel Empire Uncut was also released.
- Walt Disney Pictures' 2019 film The Lion King by Jon Favreau is a photorealistic animated remake of Disney's traditionally animated 1994 film of the same name. It features mostly different actors, with James Earl Jones reprising his role of Mufasa from the original film.
- Nosferatu: A Symphony of Horror is a 2023 horror film remake by David Lee Fisher of the 1922 original. It technically preserves a shot-by-shot format by using green screen to insert colorized backgrounds from the original film atop live-action with different actors, including Doug Jones. It is a process similar to his 2005 version of The Cabinet of Dr. Caligari which used a digital recreation of the original film's artificial backdrops with added dialogue scenes.
- Universal Pictures' 2025 film How to Train Your Dragon is a live-action remake of DreamWorks Animation's computer animated 2010 film of the same name. Like the original film, it is directed by Dean DeBlois, but features mostly different actors, with Gerard Butler reprising his role.

In the early days of sound film, it was common for Hollywood studios to produce foreign language versions of their films using the same sets and costumes but a different set of actors as the original. Although a different director would be brought in for the foreign-language version, they would have access to the daily footage from the English language production and would often use the same shots and camera setups. Often the result would be similar to a 'shot-to-shot' remake, although in some notable examples (such as Dracula (1931 Spanish-language film)), the alternate director exercised more creative freedom.

=== Animation to animation ===
- In the 1930s and 1940s, several American animated shorts originally produced in black-and-white were remade in color several years later. Key examples include Disney's Mickey Mouse cartoon Orphan's Benefit (1934) remade under the same title in 1941, and Warner Bros.' Porky in Wackyland (1938), remade in part in 1943 as Tin Pan Alley Cats and in full in 1949 as Dough for the Do-Do.
- At the Metro-Goldwyn-Mayer cartoon studio, William Hanna and Joseph Barbera remade several of their Tom and Jerry cartoons produced in the traditional full-frame Academy ratio in widescreen CinemaScope. Examples include Hatch Up Your Troubles (1949) and The Egg and Jerry (1956), Love That Pup (1949) and Tops with Pops (1957), as well as The Little Orphan and Feedin' the Kiddie (1957). Hanna and Barbera also remade Hugh Harman's 1939 MGM short Peace on Earth in CinemaScope as Good Will to Men in 1955.
- Many scenes from Evangelion: 1.0 You Are (Not) Alone are recreated shot-for-shot from the original television series Neon Genesis Evangelion.
- A genre of online collaboration projects, sometimes called "reanimated collabs", strives to create a shot-for-shot remake of an animated feature or television episode with many different animators handling different scenes. One example is Shrek Retold, a shot-for-shot remake of Shrek which was produced using 200 different creators and art styles.

=== Homage ===
Some directors pay tribute/homage to other works by including scenes that are identical:

- The Odessa Steps sequence of Battleship Potemkin has been emulated in several films, including The Untouchables, as well as the film Brazil.
- The 400 Blows has a scene identical to Zero for Conduct as a homage.
- The famous "cropduster chase" scene in North by Northwest has been the subject of numerous homages and parodies.
- The Dreamers contains numerous homages and reconstructions of scenes from films such as Bande à part, Blonde Venus, Freaks, Scarface, Queen Christina, Breathless, Sunset Boulevard, and Mouchette.
- The Disney film Enchanted includes numerous homages to animated films done shot-for-shot in live-action.
- Requiem for a Dream and Black Swan by director Darren Aronofsky feature homages to the 1997 film Perfect Blue by Satoshi Kon.

=== Television to television ===
- To celebrate its 100th episode "Mercy", the showrunners of The Walking Dead created a shot-for-shot remake of the first scene broadcast of the series from the pilot "Days Gone Bye".
- The Iranian TV series Haft Sang has been described as a shot-for-shot adaptation of Modern Family.
- Metástasis is an almost shot-for-shot Spanish-language remake of Breaking Bad, albeit changed to a Colombian setting.

=== Parodies ===
Many comedy works that rely heavily on parody use shot-for-shot as a substance of humor:

- Many Simpsons episodes parody other works by using shot-for-shot representation, such as a scene in "I'm Spelling as Fast as I Can" taken from Requiem for a Dream.
- The television show Family Guy commonly transitions into shot-for-shot remakes of famous scenes, sometimes depicting the original actors, at others inserting characters relevant to the current episode.
- The web site Funny or Die produced a shot-for-shot remake of the 1977 Bing Crosby and David Bowie duet of "Peace on Earth/Little Drummer Boy" starring Will Ferrell as David Bowie and John C. Reilly as Bing Crosby.
- A shot-for-shot remake of Kanye West's "Bound 2" music video was made where James Franco imitates Kanye West and Seth Rogen imitates Kim Kardashian.
- A fan-made webcomic parody of the manga Akira by Katsuhiro Otomo, titled Bartkira, has been created by Ryan Humphrey and is currently ongoing, with the first three volumes adapted. It is a panel-for-panel retelling of the manga illustrated by numerous artists contributing several pages each, with Otomo's characters being portrayed by members of the cast of The Simpsons; for example, Kaneda is represented by Bart Simpson, Milhouse Van Houten replaces Tetsuo, and Kei and Colonel Shikishima are portrayed by Laura Powers and Principal Skinner respectively.
