= Curtain Razor =

- Title card
- Directed by: I. Freleng
- Story by: Tedd Pierce
- Starring: Mel Blanc; Stan Freberg; Dorothy Lloyd; Dave Barry; Cliff Nazarro
- Music by: Carl Stalling
- Animation by: Manuel Perez; Ken Champin; Virgil Ross; Pete Burness
- Layouts by: Hawley Pratt
- Backgrounds by: Paul Julian
- Color process: Technicolor
- Production company: Warner Bros. Cartoons
- Distributed by: Warner Bros. Pictures; The Vitaphone Corporation
- Release date: May 21, 1949
- Running time: 7:16
- Language: English

Curtain Razor is a 1949 Warner Bros. Looney Tunes short directed by Friz Freleng. The short was released on May 21, 1949, and stars Porky Pig.

== Plot ==
An operatic tenor voice and piano music for the Act III Prelude from Richard Wagner's opera Lohengrin accompany the opening credits and earth-shaking scene as hopeful stage talents wait outside the office of Goode and Korny: Talent Agents. While singing, the voice boasts of his previous experience in other venues. The voice turns out to belong to a tiny grasshopper, who ends his performance with Blanc's trademark pronunciation of "Cuc-amonga". Porky, who is the agency's producer and listening to the auditions, tells the grasshopper he might have a spot for him.

The rest of the short consists of a series of acts by various performers, most of whom Porky rejects, often via the use of a trap door:

- Act 1: A hen (who bears a resemblance to Disney's Clara Cluck) clucks "Blue Danube". Porky seems to like this act, but the hen literally "lays an egg" and takes this event in its figurative sense in that her act flopped. Porky pulls a lever next to his desk that sends the hen through a trap door in the floor. The egg hovers for a moment and hatches to reveal a sad-looking, Tweety-like chick who waves goodbye before also falling through the trap door.
- Act 2: A character resembling Cecil Turtle, but with Mel Blanc's voice says he is the "man of a thousand voices." He goes through a rapid fire montage of voice impressions (including Lionel Barrymore, Senator Claghorn, Bugs Bunny, Rochester, and Jimmy Durante). Porky says that he counted only 999 voices. The turtle is stumped as to what his thousandth voice is and exits the office hoping that he'll remember it later (a similar character is Noah's dad in the Noah Byrd Movies and series).
- Act 3: Bingo the Parrot (from "Catch as Cats Can"), Frankie the Rooster, and Al the Duck sing the popular hit song April Showers, each in the distinctive manner of their namesakes. Porky tells them that he'll consider their act but says after they leave that it was a low class act that only bobbysoxers would like. (Even though he himself is seen wearing stereotypical bobby socks and saddle shoes.)
- Act 4: A literal two-headed man enters the office. Porky gushes "Oh boy two-headed! This ought to be a sensational act!" The two-headed man exclaims "Act, Shmact! I'm the janitor," as he empties Porky's pail into another pail and leaves.
- Act 5: J. Fenton Hadding, a dog in a bathing suit, places his briefcase on the floor. It turns out to be an elevated platform that the dog rides through the office skylight five hundred feet into the air. The dog then dives into a glass of water that he is holding in his hand, describing his whole act throughout. Porky sends the dog stuck in his water glass down the trap door.
- Act 6: Crawford Coo, a man in a circus ringmaster's outfit, has a trained pigeon act. He sets up various pigeon-sized acrobatic equipment and releases the pigeons from a box, but the pigeons fly out the window. Crawford tries tap dancing instead, but Porky sends him down the trap door.
- Act 7: A shaggy dog enters. Porky thinks it's a dog act, but the dog hands him a business card, announcing that he is the Itch and Scratch Flea Circus. The dog blows a whistle and fleas hop from his back to build a tiny circus tent and carnival midway, then dismantle it when the dog blows the whistle again. The music played here is the Wackyland Rubber Band rendition of "Frat" as featured in the shorts "Tin Pan Alley Cats", "Knights Must Fall", and "Dough for the Do-Do".
- A running gag found throughout the short is the fox frequently barging in to arrogantly brag to Porky about his "sensational act", only for Porky to reject him every time. The first time happens between Act 1 and Act 2, A fox bursts in telling Porky that his act is the best ever, but Porky tells him that it's not his turn yet. The second time happens between Act 4 and Act 5 when the fox barges into the office again, telling Porky to watch his act, only for Porky tells him to go back out and wait his turn. The third and final time happens between Act 6 and Act 7 when the fox bursts in again, only for the fed-up Porky to send him down the trap door.

Finally, it is the fox's turn to do his act. He dons a devil's costume and swallows atomic powder, TNT, gasoline, and finally, a lit match, which he explodes into total nothingness. Porky applauds him, thinking the act is terrific, but the fox, now deceased and as a transparent ghost, comes through the office door and says that there is only one tiny problem with the act: "I could only do it once!"

== Home media ==
Curtain Razor is available restored on the Looney Tunes Super Stars' Porky & Friends: Hilarious Ham DVD and the Warner Archive Collection Blu-ray releases of Flamingo Road and Cats Don't Dance.

== See also ==
- Porky Pig filmography
- Looney Tunes and Merrie Melodies filmography (1940–1949)
