= Pedram Pour-Amiri =

Iranian screenwriter and director

- پدرام پورامیری
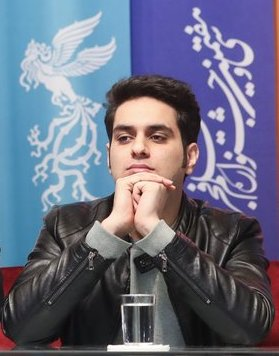
- Pouramiri at the 37th Fajr Film Festival (2019)
- Born: 1994 (age 31–32)
- Occupations: film director, screenwriter
- Notable work: We Are All Together; Maple, Drown

Pedram Pour-Amiri (born 1994) is an Iranian screenwriter and director. He has been nominated for the Crystal Simorgh three times. Pour-Amiri and Hossein Amiri Domari are credited as "the youngest directors of Iranian cinema", producing their first film when they were 23.

== Filmography ==
Year	Title	Credit
2021	Maple	Screenwriter
2020	Drown	Screenwriter
2019	We Are All Together	Screenwriter
2019	Alive	Director and screenwriter
2018	Oblivion	Screenwriter
2016	Related By Blood	Director and screenwriter

== Awards ==
Title	Festival	Category	Result
Related By Blood	Tehran International Short Film Festival	Best Screenplay	Won
Related By Blood	Tehran International Short Film Festival	Best Film Director	Nominated
Related By Blood	Fajr Film Festival	Crystal Simorgh for Best Short Film	Nominated
Drown	Fajr Film Festival	Crystal Simorgh for Best Screenplay	Nominated
Drown	Asian Film Festival Barcelona 2021	Best Screenplay	Won
Drown	Wales International Film Festival	Best Screenplay	Won
Alive	Fajr Film Festival	Crystal Simorgh for Best First Film Director	Nominated
Alive	Iranian Film Festival Australia	Best First Film Award	Won
