= Day of a Lion =

2025 film

- Theatrical release poster
- Directed by: Foscht Twins: Bianca Foscht, Dilara Foscht
- Written by: Foscht Twins: Bianca Foscht, Dilara Foscht
- Produced by: Foscht Twins: Bianca Foscht, Dilara Foscht
- Starring: Bianca Foscht; Dilara Foscht; Simone Neviani
- Cinematography: Marco Lamera
- Edited by: James Clark
- Music by: Emiliano Ausin
- Distributed by: Gravitas Ventures (North American Release)
- Release dates: December 19, 2024 (Wales International Film Festival); August 15, 2025 (North America)
- Running time: 86 minutes
- Country: Canada
- Languages: English; German; Italian; French

Day of a Lion is a 2024 Canadian multilingual independent film. A psychodrama written, directed and starring the Foscht twins, Bianca Foscht and Dilara Foscht, it premiered in December 2024 at the Wales International Film Festival, where it won Best Foreign Feature Film.

== Plot ==
Set in the late 1950s, the film tells the story of sisters Wanda and Dolly, who, after their father's sudden death, reunite at their childhood home and discover they have grown apart by keeping secrets from one another for decades. Once close but now estranged, as they begin to go through their father's belongings and settle his affairs, they find themselves unraveling forgotten secrets from the past. Tensions run high as the house, once filled with memories, becomes a battleground where old wounds are reopened. The sisters, drawn into a game of cat and mouse, struggle to confront their shared history.

== Cast ==
- Bianca Foscht as Wanda
- Dilara Foscht as Dolly
- Simone Neviani as Geronimo

== Production and release ==
The Foschts wrote, directed and star in the film. Their interest in “collapsing identity through the craft of acting” inspired them to create Day of a Lion. Filming took place in the spring of 2023 in one location in Vancouver. The film premiered on December 19, 2024, at the Wales International Film Festival. It was released in North America via digital platforms in August 2025.

== Awards ==
- 2024: Winner, International Feature Film Award (Bianca and Dilara Foscht), Wales International Film Festival
- 2024: Nominated, Best First Time Filmmaker Award, Montreal Independent Film Festival
- 2025: Winner(?), several awards at the Idyllwild International Festival of Cinema:
  - Best International Feature Film (Bianca & Dilara Foscht)
  - Best Original Screenplay (Bianca & Dilara Foscht)
  - Best Supporting Actor (Simone Neviani)
  - Best Supporting Actress (Dilara Foscht)
  - Vanguard Award for Best Lead Actress (Bianca Foscht)
  - Best Sound Design on a Feature Film (Kevin Hamilton, Fresh Air Audio Studios)
  - Best Costume Design on a Feature Film (Aurora Cyr, Christina Maree Leeson)
