= Mina Vahid =

Iranian actress (born 1987)

- مینا وحید
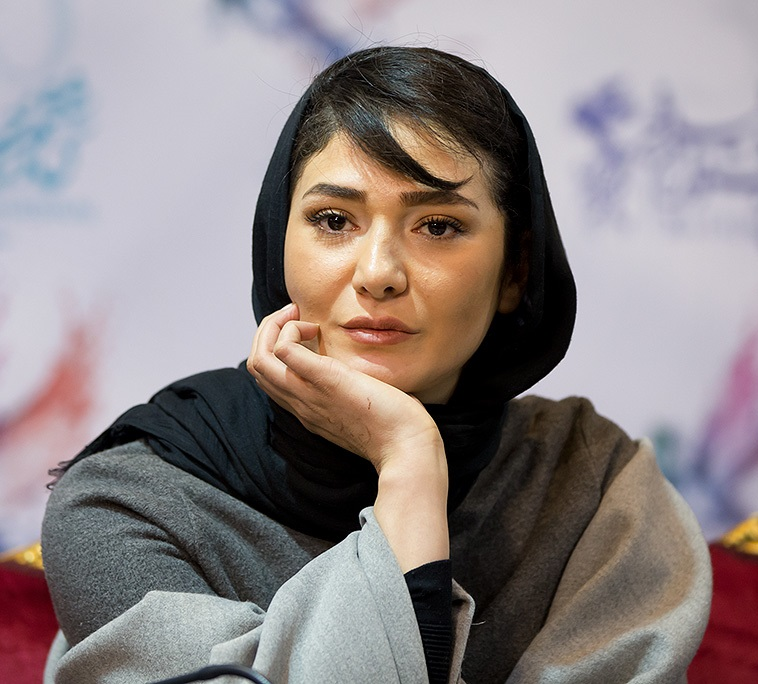
- Vahid at the 2018 Fajr Film Festival
- Born: August 8, 1980 (age 46); Rasht, Iran
- Education: Master's degree in Dramatic Literature
- Occupations: Actress; writer
- Years active: 2008–present

Mina Vahid (Persian: مینا وحید; born July 8, 1980) is an Iranian actress. She started her acting career in 2008 with the film The Green Fire. She is best known for her roles in Time to Love (2015), Shahrzad (2015–2016), One Night in Tehran (2019) and Maple (2021).

== Career ==
Mina Vahid made her cinematic debut in 2008 with the movie The Green Fire and has since appeared in more than 20 cinematic and television and Theater projects.

She demonstrated her talent with her performance in the movie Time to Love .The film was nominated for 10 Crystal Simorghs at the 33rd Fajr Film Festival. in 2020 she won the Best Lead Actress award for One Night in Tehran in 13th Annual Iranian Film Festival – San Francisco.

== Filmography ==
=== Film ===
Year	Title	Role	Director	Notes
2008	The Green Fire	Nardane's friend	Mohammad Reza Aslani	Film debut
2012	Receiver	Secretary	Mehrdad Ghafar Zadeh	
2014	Henna		Afshin Sadeghi	
2015	Time to Love	Mitra	Alireza Raeesian	the seventh highest-grossing film of 2015 in Iran
2016	Where Are My Shoes?	Bita	Kiumars Pourahmad	
2017	The Hair		Babak Habibifar	Short Film
2018	Highlight	Nasrin	Asghar Naimi	
2018	Rhino	Donya	Behzad Asadi	Short Film
2019	Wormhole	Mina Shayegan	Vahid Davoodi Pooya	Short Film
2019	A Man Without a Shadow		Alireza Raeesian	as co-writer
2019	One Night in Tehran	Leila	Farhad Najafi	
2021	The Other One		Amir Tavakoli	
2022	Paper Dream	Yasi	Ali Atshani	
2022	Coup		Majid Torbati Fard	Short film
2023	Justifiable Murder		Ebrahim Rahnama	Short film
2024	Bodiless	Mona Ezzatyar	Morteza Alizadeh	
2025	Key Role		Shahed Ahmadloo	
TBA	Author		Javad Khamisabadi	
TBA	Top Scorer	Arash's aunt	Bijan Shirmarz	

=== Web ===
Year	Title	Role	Director	Platform
2015–2016	Shahrzad	Maryam Mehrzad	Hassan Fathi	Lotus Play
2021	Island	Golrokh	Siroos Moghaddam	Filimo
2022	Made in Iran	Mahsa	Bahman Goodarzi	Filimo

=== Television ===
Year	Title	Role	Director	Network	Notes
2012	Local Time in Zero	Forough	Ahmad Moazemi	IRIB TV1	TV film
2013	Daughters of Eve	Souda	Hossein Soheilizadeh	IRIB TV5	TV series
2018–2019	Lady of the Mansion	Javaher	Azizollah Hamidnezhad	IRIB TV3	TV series
2021	Maple	Mahtab	Behrang Tofighi	IRIB TV1	TV series
2021–2022	It Snows Silently	Narges Jafarzadeh	Pouria Azarbayjani	IRIB TV3	TV series
2024	The Octopus	Ms. Chemist	Ahmad Moazemi	IRIB TV1	TV series

== Awards and nominations ==
Year	Award	Category	Nominated work	Result	Ref.
2019	Madrid International Film Festival	Best Lead Actress in a Short Film	Wormhole	Won	
2020	Iranian Film Festival – San Francisco	Best Actress	One Night in Tehran	Won	
2020	Skiptown Playhouse International Film Festival	Best Performance by a Leading Female (International)	One Night in Tehran	Won	

== See also ==
- Iranian women
- Iranian cinema
- Fajr International Film Festival
