= Mehdi Soltani =

Iranian actor

Mehdi Soltani Sarvestani
- مهدی سلطانی سروستانی
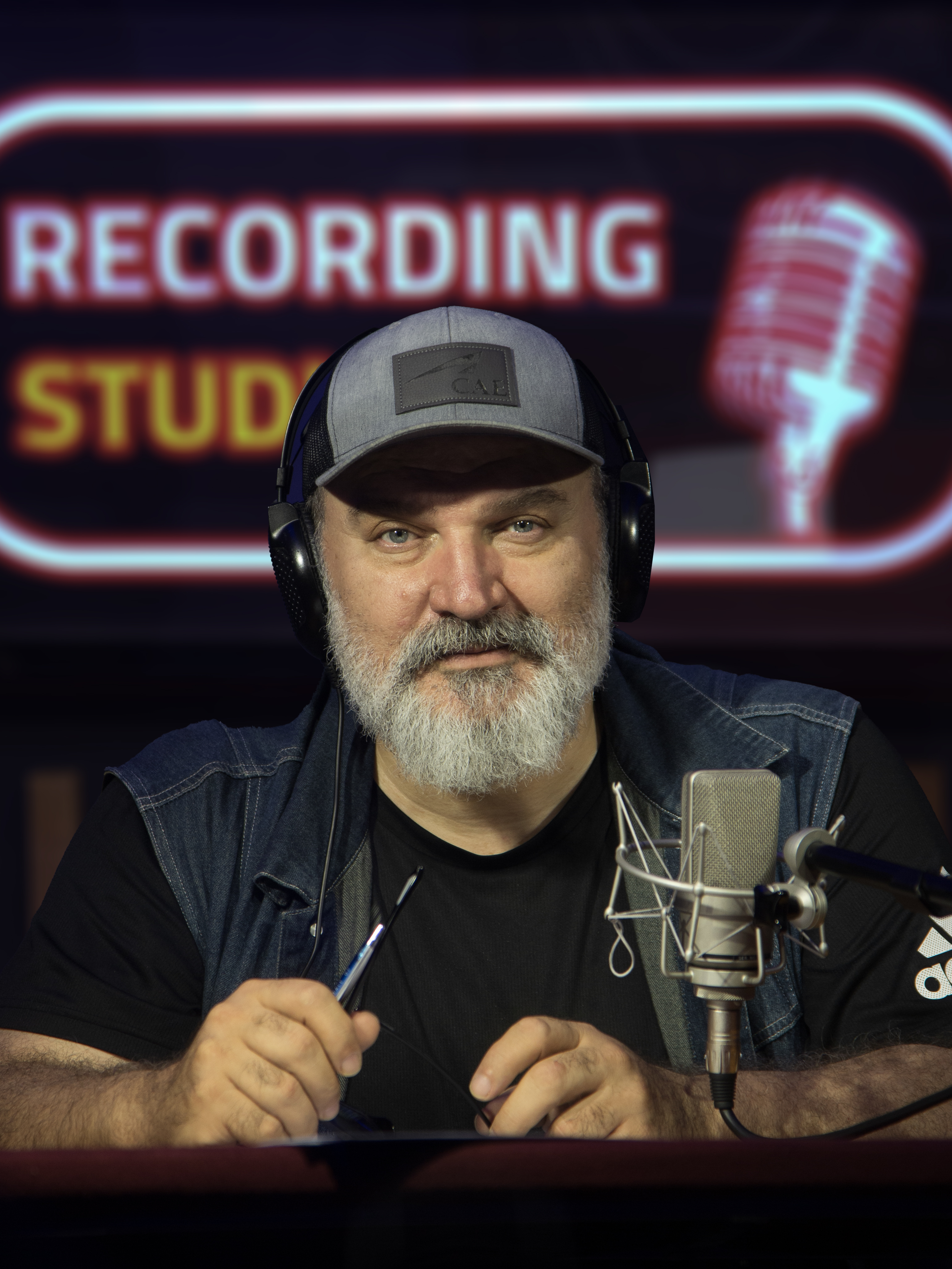
- Born: Mohammad Mehdi; 23 August 1971 (age 54); Shiraz, Iran
- Citizenship: Iranian
- Occupation: Actor
- Years active: 1995–present

Mehdi Soltani or Mehdi Soltani Sarvestani (Persian: مهدی سلطانی) is an Iranian actor born on 23 August 1971 in Shiraz, Iran.

== Biography ==
He holds a PhD in theater acting from the Avignon University in France, and he is currently a faculty member and assistant professor at the Faculty of Performing Arts and Music, University of Tehran.

Soltani was among hundreds of academic faculty who signed a letter condemning the government's crackdown of the 2025–2026 Iranian protests, and failure to prevent a future attack on Iran by the United States and Israel in response to the crackdown.

== Filmography ==
=== Film ===
- The Last Port directed by Hassan Hedayat
- Bright Shadow directed by Hassan Hedayat
- The Queen directed by Mohammad Ali Bashe Ahangar
- Che directed by Ebrahim Hatamikia
- Ghosts directed by Dariush Mehrjui
- All Through The Night directed by Farzad Motamen
- Sohrab's Dream directed by Ali Ghavitan
- Silver Man directed by Mohammad Hossein Latifi

=== Web ===
- Shahrzad directed by Hassan Fathi
- Sleepless directed by Siroos Moghaddam
- Aghazadeh directed by Behrang Tofighi
- Amsterdam directed by Masoud Gharagozlu

=== Television ===
- 73 Nowroz directed by Hossein Fardrou
- Detective directed by Hassan Hedayat
- The Truth in The Mirror directed by Esmail Mihandoost
- Hananeh directed by Mostafa Yarmahmoudi
- Trial directed by Hassan Hedayat
- The Final Decision directed by Mohsen Shah Mohammadi
- Memorable Days directed by Homayoun Shahnavaz
- In the Strand of Zayandeh Rud directed by Hassan Fathi
- The Wall' directed by Siroos Moghaddam
- Crime and Punishment (film) directed by Abbas Rafei
- Photography Studio directed by Farzin Mehdipour
- Motherhood directed by Javad Afshar
- Medina directed by Siroos Moghaddam
- Haft Sang directed by Ali Reza Bazrafshan
- Paper House (film) directed by Mahmoud Mozeni
- Kimia directed by Javad Afshar
- Under The Mother's Feet directed by Behrang Tofighi
- Father directed by Behrang Tofighi
- Maple directed by Behrang Tofighi
