= Mohammad Mehdi Hosseini =

Iranian actor

Mehdi Hosseini
- مهدی حسینی
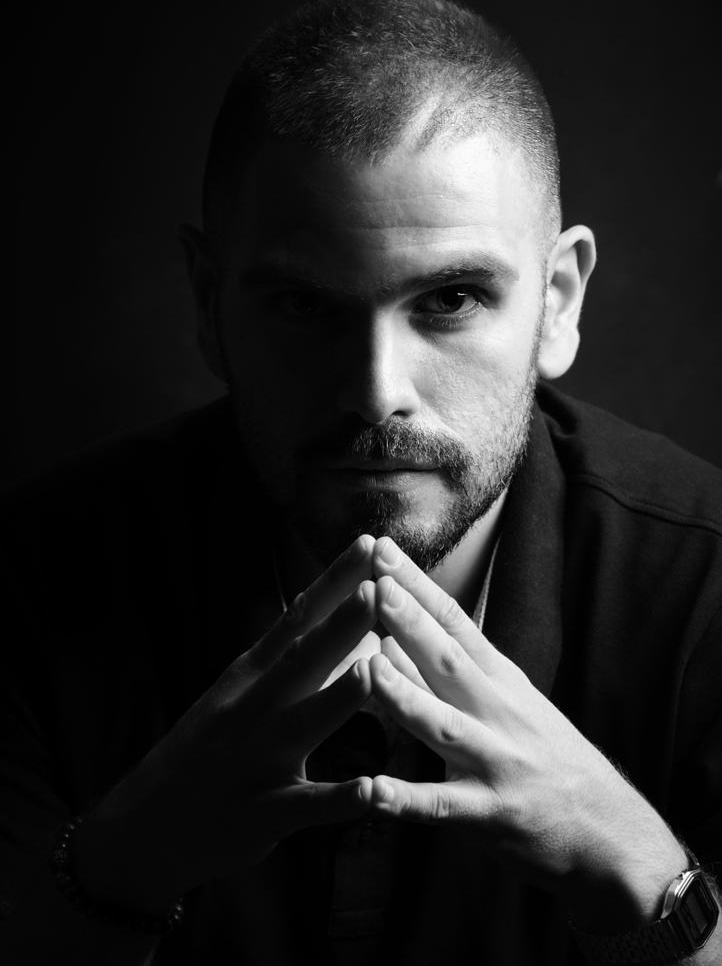
- Born: Mohammad Mehdi Hosseini; March 11, 1990 (age 35); Tehran, Iran
- Occupation: Actor
- Years active: 2010–present
- Notable work: One Night in Tehran; Are You Volleyball?!
- Height: 1.82 m (6 ft 0 in)

Mehdi Hosseini (Persian: مهدی حسینی; born 11 March 1990 in Tehran) is an Iranian actor.

== Biography ==
Mehdi Hosseini is an Iranian actor and writer who started his career in 2010 on Iranian television. He is the main actor of the short film Are You Volleyball, which is one of the most honorable short film in the history of Iranian cinema and has participated in 404 international festivals. He‌ has also the main role in the film One Night in Tehran, for which he won awards at prestigious international festivals.

== Filmography ==
=== Film ===
Year	Title	Role	Director	Notes	Ref.
2018	Are You Volleyball?!	Soldier	Mohammad Bakhshi & Saeid Ahanj	Short Film	
2019	Wormhole	Behnam	Vahid Davoodi Pooya	Short Film	
2019	One Night in Tehran	Amir Ali	Farhad Najafi	Feature Film	
2019	The Crossing		Sara Ghafourian	Short Film	

=== Television ===
Year	Title	Role	Director	Network	Ref.
2010–2014	Maybe It Will Happen to You			IRIB TV5	
2011	I Have Grown Up (film)		Mohammad Pour Zargham		
2011	The 7th Day (film)		Mohammad Pour Zargham		
2012	The Last Days of Winter		Mohammad Hossein Mahdavian	IRIB TV1	
2014	Warm Winter		Rasoul Saneei	IRIB TV5	
2016	Paria		Hossein Soheili Zadeh	IRIB TV3	
2016	Turbulence		Vahid Bitarafan	IRIB TV5	
2017–2018	Darkness of Night, Lightness of Day		Hojat Ghasemzadeh Asl	IRIB TV1	
