= Farnaz Rahnama =

Iranian actress

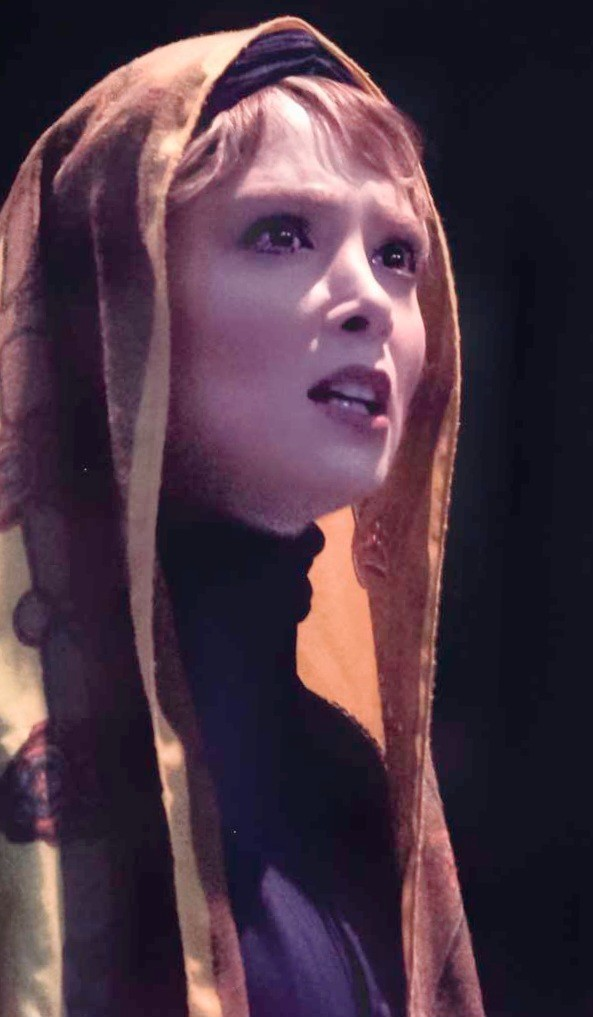
- Born: October 19, 1981 (age 44); Isfahan, Iran
- Occupations: Actress, director
- Years active: 2001–present

Farnaz Rahnama (In Persian: فرناز رهنما); (born October 19, 1981) is an Iranian actress and director. She is known for her roles in various Iranian television series and films.

== Early life ==
Farnaz Rahnama was born on October 19, 1981, in Isfahan, Iran.

She developed an interest in acting during her teenage years and pursued formal training in theater and performing arts.

She graduated art university of Tehran in acting in 2005.

== Career ==
Rahnama began her professional acting career in the early 2000s, appearing in several television series and theatrical productions. She gained recognition for her versatile performances in both comedic and dramatic roles.

In addition to acting, Rahnama has also worked as a director and has been involved in cultural and artistic projects in Iran.

== Filmography ==
=== Film ===
Year	Title	Director
2006	Aqlima	Mohammad-Mehdi Asgarpour
2009	Dog's Afternoon	Mostafa Kiyaee
2010	Things You Don't Know	Fereydoon Sahba Zamani
2010	One, Two, One	Mania Akbari

=== Television ===
Year	Title	Director	Notes
2002	Case Review	Alaoddin Rahimi	
2006	Basement	Alireza Afkhami	
2008	Escort Agent	Saeed Soltani	
2010	Doctors' Building (TV series)	Soroush Sehat	
2014	Haft Sang	Alireza Bazrafshan	Ramadan series
2015	Notes of a Housewife	Masoud Karamati	
2016	Eight and a Half Minutes	Shahram Shah Hosseini	
2020	Baby Engineer 3	Ali Ghaffari	

=== Web series ===
Year	Title	Director	Notes
2023	Oscar	Mehran Modiri	Guest
2022	Once Upon a Time on Mars	Peyman Ghasemkhani	Guest actor

=== Telefilms ===
Year	Title	Director
2007	Robot	Mehrdad Khoshbakh
2007	Nirang	Mehrdad Khoshbakh
2008	Sea Light	Hassan Lafafian
2009	Endless Affection	Mohsen Monshizadeh
2013	Oath	Farbod Shokrai
2016	Fish's Wish (video film)	Arash Sanjabi
