= The Queen (2012 film) =

- Directed by: Mohammad Ali Bashe Ahangar
- Written by: Mohammad Ali Bashe Ahangar; Mohammad Reza Gohari
- Produced by: Abolghasem Hosseini
- Starring: Milad Keymaram; Mostafa Zamani; Mehdi Soltani; Hooman Barghnavard; Homayoun Ershadi; Hamid Reza Azarang; Malek Seraj; Mojtaba Asvadian
- Cinematography: Alireza Zarrindast
- Edited by: Mohammad Ali Bashe Ahangar
- Music by: Hossein Alizâdeh
- Release date: February 2012 (Fajr Film Festival)
- Running time: 91 minutes
- Country: Iran
- Language: Persian

The Queen (Persian: Malakeh) is a 2012 Iranian film directed by Mohammad Ali Bashe Ahangar

== Cast ==
- Milad Keymaram as Siavosh
- Mostafa Zamani as Jamshid
- Mehdi Soltani as Amjad
- Hooman Barghnavard
- Homayoun Ershadi
- Hamid Reza Azarang as Saifollah
- Malek Seraj
- Mojtaba Asvadian
- Hossein Ahangar as Mousa

== Awards and nominations ==
| Year | Award | Category | Recipient | Result |
|---|---|---|---|---|
| 2012 | 30th Fajr International Film Festival | Best Music | Hossein Alizadeh | Won |
| 2012 | 30th Fajr International Film Festival | Best design and costume | Abbas Belondi | Won |
| 2012 | 30th Fajr International Film Festival | Best special effects | Hassan Izadi | Won |
