= We Are All Together =

2019 Iranian comedy film

- Film poster
- Persian: ما همه با هم هستیم
- Directed by: Kamal Tabrizi
- Written by: Pedram Pour Amiri, Hosein Amiri Domari, Mohammad Davoudi
- Produced by: Reza Mirkarimi
- Starring: Mehran Modiri; Leila Hatami; Mohammad Reza Golzar; Vishka Asayesh; Mani Haghighi; Hanieh Tavassoli; Javad Ezzati; Pejman Jamshidi
- Cinematography: Farshad Mohammadi
- Music by: Mohammad Reza Aligholi
- Release date: June 21, 2019 (Shanghai International Film Festival)
- Country: Iran
- Language: Persian

We Are All Together (Persian: ما همه با هم هستیم, romanized: Ma hame baham hastim) is a 2019 Iranian comedy film directed by Kamal Tabrizi. The key cast includes Mohammad Reza Golzar, Leila Hatami, Mehran Ghafourian, Pejman Jamshidi and Sirus Gorjestani.

== Plot ==
The comedy film tells the story of an airline that is going bankrupt.

== Cast ==
- Mehran Modiri
- Mohammad Reza Golzar
- Leila Hatami
- Mani Haghighi
- Hanieh Tavassoli
- Javad Ezzati
- Soroush Sehhat
- Reza Naji
- Vishka Asayesh
- Pejman Jamshidi
- Mehran Ghafourian
- Hassan Majouni
- Shpejtim Arifi
- Ali Shadman
- Mohamadreza Tavakoli
- Ghazaal Vakili
