= Haft Sang (TV series) =

Iranian TV series, unofficial remake of Modern Family

- Poster for Haft Sang
- Also known as: Seven Stones
- Genre: Drama; Romance; Comedy; Family
- Created by: Christopher Lloyd; Steven Levitan
- Based on: Modern Family by Christopher Lloyd; Steven Levitan
- Written by: Alireza Bazrafshan; Sara Khosroabadi
- Directed by: Alireza Bazrafshan
- Starring: Mehdi Soltani; Parviz Poorhosseini; Behnam Tashakkor; Farnaz Rahnama; Shabnam Moghaddami; Elham Pavehnejad; Afshin Sangchap; Amir Reza Delavari; Arsalan Ghasemi
- Country of origin: Iran
- Original language: Persian
- No. of episodes: 25

Production
- Running time: 45 minutes
- Production company: 20th Century Fox International Television

Original release
- Network: IRIB TV3
- Release: June 29 – July 31, 2014

Haft Sang (Persian: هفت‌سنگ; "Seven stones") is an Iranian television series by the Islamic Republic of Iran Broadcasting (IRIB). It began airing in 2014, one day after the beginning of Ramadan. It is an unauthorised adaptation (or, as some commentators say, shot-for-shot copy) of the American television series Modern Family. 20th Century Fox did not authorize the production of this series, due to the economic sanctions by the U.S. against Iran.

The show is named after "haft sang" or lagori, a children's game. Each episode is around 40 to 50 minutes long, twice as long as each episode of the original American version. As a result, the series has been said to have a slower pace compared to the American version. Some subplots in the American version are not present in Haft Sang, such as the ones that pertain to homosexuality or dating.

== Characters ==
Character Name in Haft Sang	Corresponding Character in Modern Family
Mohsen	Phil Dunphy
Leila	Claire Dunphy
Shaahin	Luke Dunphy
Shadi	Alex Dunphy
Amir*	Haley Dunphy
Anoush	Dylan Marshall
Nasir	Jay Pritchett
Mehri	Gloria Pritchett
Hamed	Manny Delgado
Behrooz**	Mitch Pritchett
Elham**	Cam Tucker

*Portrayal of friendships between boys and girls is not permitted on Iranian television. As such, the character of Haley Dunphy is replaced by that of a teenage boy, Amir. Haley's boyfriend, Dylan, is accordingly changed to Anoush, Amir's friend.

**Due to complications in televising homosexuality in Iran, the Iranian equivalents of Mitch and Cam are a heterosexual couple, Behrooz and Elham. Accordingly, the reason for them adopting a child is due to Elham's infertility.
