= Ghosts (2014 film) =

- Persian: اشباح
- Directed by: Dariush Mehrjui
- Written by: Dariush Mehrjui (Based on Ghosts play by Henrik Ibsen)
- Produced by: Dariush Mehrjui; Jahangir Kosari; Production Manager: Mohammad-Kamal Alavi
- Starring: Mahtab Keramati; Homayoun Ershadi; Mehdi Soltani; Amirali Danaei; Hengameh Hamidzadeh
- Cinematography: Mahmoud Kalari
- Edited by: Hassan Hassandoost
- Distributed by: Baranak
- Release date: 14 May 2014
- Running time: 90 minutes
- Country: Iran
- Language: Persian

Ghosts (Persian: اشباح, romanized: Ašbāh) is a 2014 Iranian drama film written and directed by Dariush Mehrjui.

== Plot ==
Commander Soleimani (Mehdi Soltani) and his wife get stuck in their relationship. The family lawyer's efforts to improve their living conditions are in vain. Years later, the commander's sins take over Maziar and make the path of his love and life difficult. Commander Soleimani rapes his maid (Melika Sharifinia) and makes her pregnant and...

== Cast ==
- Mahtab Keramati
- Homayoun Ershadi
- Mehdi Soltani
- Amirali Danaei
- Hengameh Hamidzadeh
- Hassan Majuni
- Melika Sharifinia
- Rabeheh Madani
- Soroush Khoobroo
- Ahmad Yavarishad
- Hossein Dalman
