= Today (2014 film) =

2014 film

- Film poster
- Directed by: Reza Mirkarimi
- Written by: Reza Mirkarimi; Shadmehr Rastin
- Produced by: Reza Mirkarimi
- Starring: Parviz Parastui; Soheila Golestani
- Cinematography: Hooman Behmanesh
- Edited by: Reza Mirkarimi
- Music by: Amin Honarmand
- Distributed by: iFILM Production
- Release date: 7 February 2014
- Running time: 90 minutes
- Country: Iran
- Language: Persian

Today is a 2014 Iranian drama film directed by Reza Mirkarimi. It was screened in the Contemporary World Cinema section at the 2014 Toronto International Film Festival. It was selected as the Iranian entry for the Best Foreign Language Film at the 87th Academy Awards, but was not nominated.

== Cast ==
- Parviz Parastui as Younes
- Soheila Golestani
- Shabnam Moghaddami
- Roozbeh Hesari
- Ashkan Jenabi
- Hesam Mahmoudi
- Ava Sharifi

== Reception ==
In a review for Variety, Dennis Harvey wrote,"Taking its cue from that no-nonsense protag (and in contrast to the atypically rich palate of Mirkarimi’s previous film, A Cube of Sugar), Today is terse and unadorned in nearly all aspects. That rigor lends slow-burning impact to a story (and in particular an ending) that might easily have been played for mawkish sentimentality. Houman Behmanesh’s crisp lensing is the dominant element in the professionally assembled package; there’s no music at all until a bedside conversation provides some belated emotional release for the two leads, its poignancy aptly underlined by Amin Honarmand’s score."

== See also ==
- List of submissions to the 87th Academy Awards for Best Foreign Language Film
- List of Iranian submissions for the Academy Award for Best Foreign Language Film
