= Roozbeh Hesari =

Iranian actor (born 1988)

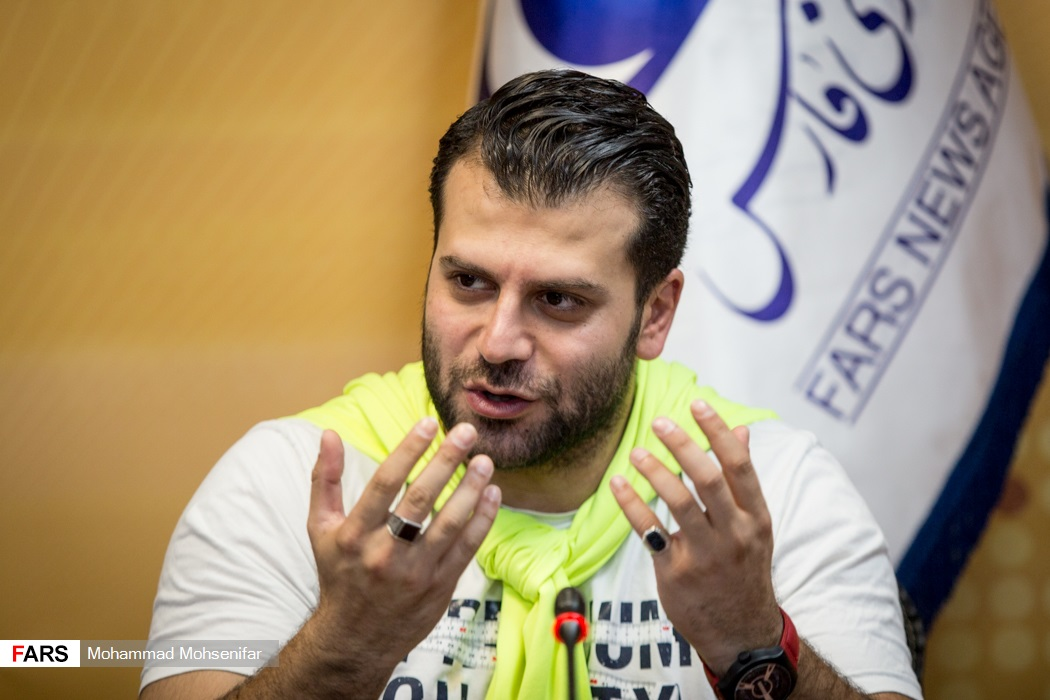
- Hesari in 2020
- Born: February 1, 1988 (age 38); Tehran, Iran
- Education: Azad University
- Occupations: Actor; singer
- Years active: 2010–present

Roozbeh Hesari (Persian: روزبه حصاری; born February 1, 1988) is an Iranian actor. He is best known for his role as Javad Javadi in the drama television series The Engineer Child (2020). Hesari received a Hafez Award nomination for his performance in Maple (2021).

== Early life ==
Roozbeh Hesari was born on February 1, 1988, in Tehran, Iran.

== Filmography ==
=== Film ===
Year	Title	Role	Director	Notes	Ref(s)
2014	Today		Reza Mirkarimi		
2017	Mahoor		Majid Niamorad	Released in 2024	
2021	Parmida		Arash Sanjabi		
2023	Column 14		Amir Hossein Hemati		
2023	Aziz	Anoush	Majid Tavakoli		
2024	Shoumah		Mozhgan Bayat		
2024	Pressure Cooker	Sahebi	Rambod Javan		

=== Web ===
Year	Title	Role	Director	Platform	Notes	Ref(s)
2019–2020	Domino	Shahrokh	Mohammad Sadegh Lavasani	Filimo, Namava	Main role; 10 episodes	

=== Television ===
Year	Title	Role	Director	Network	Notes	Ref(s)
2013	The Recall	Ali A'alaee	Hojat Ghasemzadeh Asl	IFilm	Main role	
2019	Darkness of Night, Lightness of Day	Behnam Tarighat	Hojat Ghasemzadeh Asl	IRIB TV2	Main role	
2019	Hello Mr. Principle	Amirali Sadra	Alireza Tavana	IRIB TV2	Leading role	
2020	The Engineer Child	Javad Javadi	Ali Ghafari	IRIB TV2	Leading role; season 3, 35 episodes	
2021	Maple	Masoud Forouzesh	Behrang Tofighi	IRIB TV1	Main role	

== Awards and nominations ==
Name of the award ceremony, year presented, category, nominee of the award, and the result of the nomination
Award	Year	Category	Nominated Work	Result	Ref(s)
Hafez Awards	2021	Best Actor – Television Series Drama	Maple	Nominated	
