= The Last Days of Winter (TV series) =

Iranian TV series

- آخرین روزهای زمستان
- Genre: War; Drama; Biographical
- Written by: Mohammad Hossein Mahdavian
- Directed by: Mohammad Hossein Mahdavian
- Starring: Mahdi Zaminpardaz; Soheil Babaei; Ebrahim Amini; Mojtaba Shafiei
- Narrated by: Seyyed Mohammad Avini
- Music by: Habib Khazaeifar
- Country of origin: Iran
- Original language: Persian
- No. of seasons: 1
- No. of episodes: 10

Production
- Producer: Habibollah Valinezhad
- Cinematography: Hadi Behrouz
- Editor: Mohammad Hossein Mahdavian
- Running time: 50 minutes

Original release
- Release: September 28 – December 6, 2012

The Last Days of Winter (Persian: آخرین روزهای زمستان, romanized: Akharin Rouzhaye Zemestan) is an Iranian television documentary series directed and written by Mohammad Hossein Mahdavian, which aired on IRIB TV1 from 28 September to 6 December 2012 for 10 episodes.

The series is about Hassan Bagheri, an Iranian commander in the Iran-Iraq war.

== Plot ==
The series centers on Martyr Hassan Bagheri, whose real name is Gholam Hossein Afshardi, one of the youngest commanders in Iran during the Iran-Iraq war, who was the deputy commander of the IRGC's ground forces at the time of his martyrdom.

== Cast ==
- Mahdi Zaminpardaz
- Soheil Babaei
- Ebrahim Amini
- Mojtaba Shafiei
- Saeed Mirzafar
- Gita Bahadori
- Hossein Dehghan Azad
- Hamed Pourmohammadi
- Maryam Moridi
- Mehrnoush Balmi
- Mohammad Mehdi Hosseini
