= Maple (TV series) =

Iranian TV series 2021

- Persian: افرا
- Genre: Drama; Romance
- Written by: Farzad Farzaneh; Pedram Pour Amiri; Hosein Amiri Domari; Amirhossein Najaf Pour
- Directed by: Behrang Tofighi
- Starring: Mehdi Soltani; Pejman Bazeghi; Roozbeh Hesari; Mina Vahid; Sara Bagheri; Mohammad Sadeghi
- Composer: Babak Zarin
- Country of origin: Iran
- Original language: Persian
- No. of seasons: 1
- No. of episodes: 38

Production
- Producers: Majid Molaei; Mohammad Kambiz Daraei
- Production locations: Lahijan; Langarud; Rasht; Tehran
- Cinematography: Majid Golsefidi
- Editor: Navid Tohidi
- Running time: 45 minutes

Original release
- Release: August 27 – October 10, 2021

Maple (Persian: افرا, romanized: Afra) is an Iranian romance-drama television series directed by Behrang Tofighi, which aired on IRIB TV1 from 27 August to 10 October 2021 for 38 episodes.

== Plot ==
Mahmoud (Mehdi Soltani) owns a tea and rice factory and is famous for the reputation of the factory. He has a son named Massoud (Roozbeh Hesari) and a daughter named Maedeh (Sara Bagheri). with Mahmoud's insistence, Massoud marries his cousin Mahtab (Mina Vahid), who is a surgeon, but because Massoud works as a Park Ranger and their marriage is forced, they do not understand each other and decide to divorce after 5 years of marriage.

On the other hand, Peyman (Mohammad Sadeghi), Vahid's brother (Mahmoud's worker) has fallen in love with Maedeh, but Mahmoud is against it and rejects Peyman's proposal to Maedah. later Mahmoud agrees to the proposal but..

== Cast ==
- Mehdi Soltani as Mahmoud Forouzesh
- Pejman Bazeghi as Vahid Gholipour
- Roozbeh Hesari as Masoud Forouzesh
- Mina Vahid as Mahtab Forouzesh
- Sara Bagheri as Maedeh Forouzesh
- Mohammad Sadeghi as Peyman Gholipour
- Hamoun Seyedi as Aghil Gholi Pour
- Fariba Motakhases as Azam
- Nasrin Babaei as Parvin
- Fahimeh Momeni as Saba
- Esmail Mehrabi as Sirous Gholipour
- Alireza Ara as Hamed Majd
- Payam Dehkordi as Afrasiab Mamani
- Mehdi Mehraban as Koroush
- Mehrdad Bakhshi as Alireza
- Arya Dlfani as Mehran
- Bahman Sadegh Hassani as Rahimi
- Daryoush Salimi as Rasouli

== Reception ==
=== Rating ===
According to Islamic republic of Iran broadcasting, a poll conducted on September 25, 2021, from all over the country that shows 78.9% of the people have watched the programs of television, among them, the TV series Maple recorded 43.8% of the rating.

=== Awards and nominations ===
Year	Award	Category	Recipient	Result	Ref.
2021	21st Hafez Awards	Best Television Series	Maple	Nominated	
2021	21st Hafez Awards	Best Screenplay – Television Series	Farzad Farzaneh, Amirhossein Najaf Pour	Nominated	
2021	21st Hafez Awards	Best Actor – Television Series Drama	Roozbeh Hesari	Nominated	
