= One Night in Tehran =

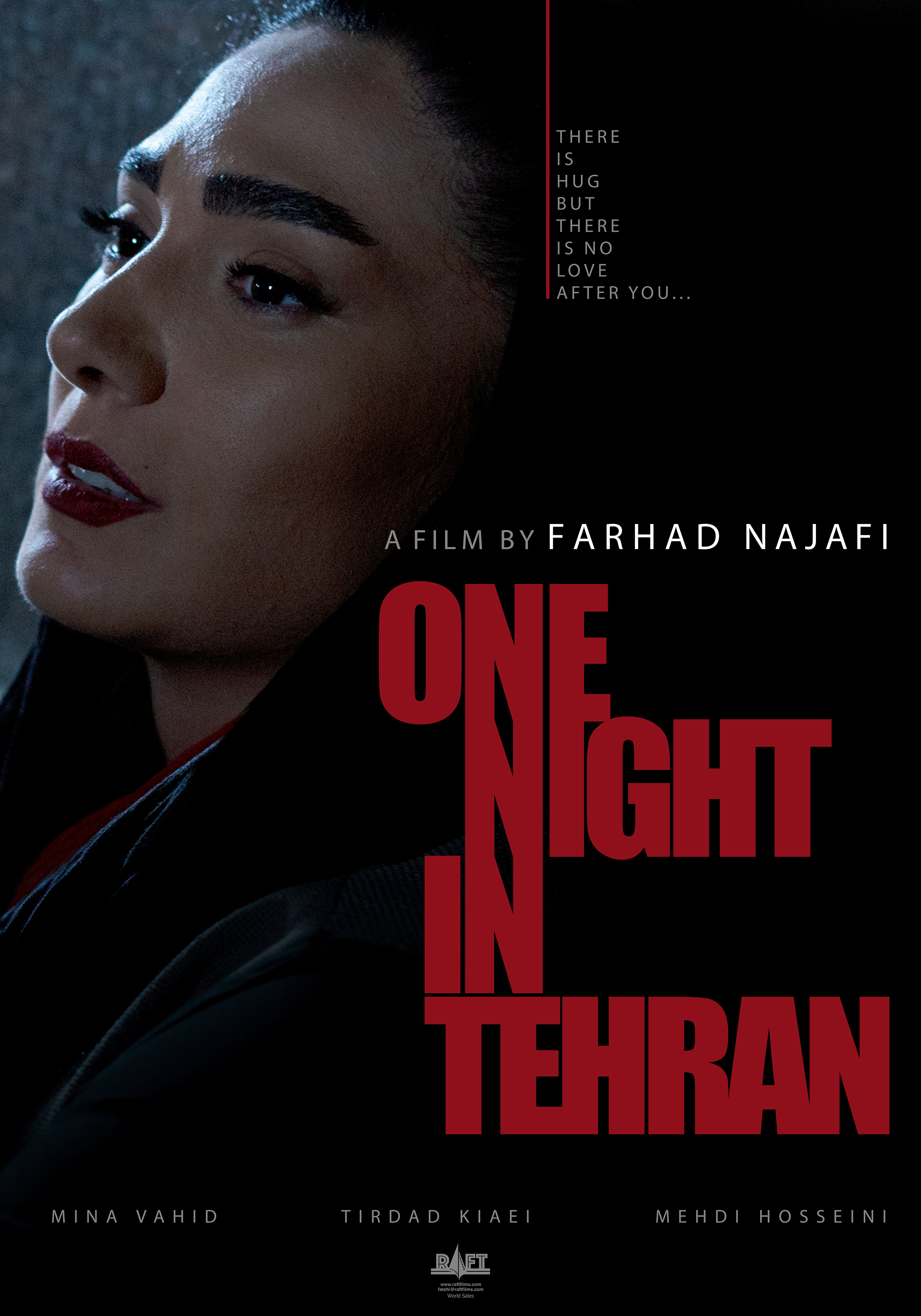
- Theatrical release poster
- Persian: بعد از تو
- Directed by: Farhad Najafi
- Written by: Farhad Najafi; Hamid Salimi
- Produced by: Mohammad Ahmadi
- Starring: Mina Vahid; Tirdad Kiaei; Mohammad Mehdi Hosseini
- Cinematography: Rouzbeh Raiga
- Edited by: Behrang Sanjabi
- Music by: Karen Homayunfar
- Distributed by: Raft Films
- Release date: 18 August 2019 (Milestone)
- Running time: 78 minutes
- Country: Iran
- Language: Persian

One Night in Tehran (Persian: بعد از تو) is an Iranian film written and directed by Farhad Najafi.

== Plot ==
New York, Tokyo and Mumbai all have their own nightlife. And so does Tehran; a nocturnal underground world unlike any other - A girl looking for her happiness within the chaos of this swallowing world gets into a night cab, unaware of how her life is going to change forever.

== Awards and nominations ==
Award	Date of ceremony	Category	Recipient(s)	Result	Ref(s)
Milestone Worldwide Film Festival	August 2019	Best Feature	Farhad Najafi	Won	
Queen Palm International Film Festival	August 2019	Best Feature	Farhad Najafi	Won	
White Unicorn International Film Festival	September 2019	Best Feature	Farhad Najafi	Nominated	
Festival de Cinema de Alter do Chão	September 2019	Best Feature	Farhad Najafi	Nominated	
DIRECTORS CUT INT'L FILM FESTIVAL		Best Feature	Farhad Najafi	Nominated	
