= Zirzamin =

- Directed by: Alireza Afkhami
- Starring: Fathali Oveisi; Bahareh Rahnama; Abolfazl Pourarab; Mahtaj Nojomi; Soroush Sehhat; Maryam Kavyani; Mehran Rajabi; Reza Tavakoli; Farnaz Rahnama; Marjaneh Golchin
- Theme music composer: Ehsan Khajeh Amiri
- Composer: Pirooz Arjmand
- Country of origin: Iran
- No. of episodes: 30

Production
- Producer: Behrouz Mofid
- Running time: 45 minutes (including commercials)
- Production company: IRIB

Original release
- Network: Channel 3
- Release: 24 September – 25 October 2006

Zirzamin (Persian: زیرزمین) is an Iranian television series that was broadcast from September 24 to October 25, 2006. It was televised specifically for the month of Ramadan, when it became one of the most popular series in Iran. It was shown on Channel 3 in Iran, and Jame Jam 1 for Iranians living abroad.

== Plot ==
The plot is about a group of forgers (Assadi, Faraj, and Kalani) who sell a land for 6 billion tomans to a businessman with a fake document. Assadi escapes with the money and buries it in the basement of a shabby house. Faraj and Kalani are arrested for having an alcoholic drink. A year later, Faraj tries to find the money. He locates Assadi, who has had an accident and is now paralysed. Assadi tells Faraj where the money is. Faraj then disguises himself as a poor person and rents a room there.

This sparks the story, with Faraj looking for the money. However, one of the neighbours dislikes him because he wanted one of his friends to rent the room. This makes him hate Faraj and become suspicious about him. Faraj looks for the money, but can't find it, because there are four basement rooms and Assadi does not remember which one it is.

== Crew ==
- Director: Alireza Arkhami
- Producer: Behrouz Mofid
- Scriptwriter: Ali Reza Bazrafshan
