= The Grey Hounded Hare =

- Title card
- Directed by: Robert McKimson
- Story by: Warren Foster
- Starring: Mel Blanc
- Music by: Carl W. Stalling
- Animation by: John Carey; Charles McKimson; Phil DeLara; Manny Gould
- Layouts by: Cornett Wood
- Backgrounds by: Richard H. Thomas
- Color process: Technicolor
- Production company: Warner Bros. Cartoons
- Distributed by: Warner Bros. Pictures; The Vitaphone Corporation
- Release date: August 6, 1949 (USA)
- Running time: 6:40
- Language: English

The Grey Hounded Hare is a 1949 Looney Tunes short film made by Warner Bros. Pictures and starring the voice talent of Mel Blanc. The film features Bugs Bunny. It was directed by Robert McKimson, and animated by John Carey, Phil DeLara, Manny Gould and Charles McKimson, with music scored by Carl W. Stalling. The title refers to the greyhounds of the plot as well as "hounded" meaning pestered or pursued relentlessly.

== Plot ==
Emerging from a hole at a greyhound track, Bugs Bunny gets caught up in the anticipation of an upcoming dog race. Fascinated by the competitors, Bugs befriends a large greyhound named Gnawbone, unintentionally angering him. When the race begins, Bugs intervenes to "rescue" a mechanical rabbit lure, causing chaos.

Escaping from the pursuing dogs, Bugs heads to the Dog Pound but faces off against Gnawbone. Using clever tricks, Bugs outsmarts the relentless hound, leading him into a collision with a fire hydrant. With Gnawbone defeated, Bugs tries to kiss the lure, only to be electrocuted as it returns to its starting box each time.

Bugs quotes Rick in Casablanca by saying "This is the beginning of a beautiful friendship".

== Home media ==
This cartoon is available, uncensored and uncut, on Disc 1 of the Looney Tunes Golden Collection: Volume 4 DVD set.

== See also ==
- Bugs Bunny filmography
- Looney Tunes and Merrie Melodies filmography (1940–1949)

Preceded by Knights Must Fall	Bugs Bunny Cartoons; 1949	Succeeded by The Windblown Hare
