= Knights Must Fall =

- Directed by: I. Freleng
- Story by: Tedd Pierce
- Starring: Mel Blanc
- Music by: Carl Stalling
- Animation by: Ken Champin; Gerry Chiniquy; Manuel Perez; Virgil Ross
- Layouts by: Hawley Pratt
- Backgrounds by: Paul Julian
- Color process: Technicolor
- Production company: Warner Bros. Cartoons
- Distributed by: Warner Bros. Pictures; The Vitaphone Corporation
- Release date: July 16, 1949 (USA premiere)
- Running time: 6:58
- Language: English

Knights Must Fall is a 1949 Warner Bros. Merrie Melodies cartoon directed by Friz Freleng. The short was released on July 16, 1949, and stars Bugs Bunny. A spoof of the King Arthur mythology, the title is a pun on the 1937 film Night Must Fall.

== Plot ==
Bugs (as a knave) stands in line with several knights, chewing a carrot. As Bugs finishes eating, he disposes of the carrot in the suit of "Sir Pantsalot of Drop Seat Manor" (a pun on Sir Lancelot), angering Pantsalot. After they exchange glove blows to each other (with Bugs using one of Pantsalot's gauntlets), the two agree to settle their feud with a joust. The joust begins with Pantsalot introduced to great fanfare, and Bugs being booed. Pantsalot beats Bugs back twice, and destroys Bugs' lance on his third attempt with his shield, earning Bugs the derision of the crowd ("Hey! That cast-iron palooka's making a chump outta me!"). Half-time is signaled with the entertainment consisting of a band playing music (used prior in Porky in Wackyland).

The second half begins with Bugs and Pantsalot trading head blows until Bugs tickles Pantsalot using a pneumatic drill on Pantsalot's armor. Pantsalot responds by attempting to swing a cast-iron ball at Bugs, who uses a spring to cause the ball to recoil and slam Pantsalot in the head. Bugs then says, "It is to laugh!", and laughs. Then, Bugs tricks Pantsalot into opening his helmet and peeking out so that he can punch Pantsalot's head back in. Pantsalot chases Bugs into a rabbit hole on the field. Bugs comes up from an adjacent hole while Pantsalot looks for him. Bugs hits Pantsalot on the head again, angering Pantsalot, who smashes what he thinks is Bugs in armor. He finds Bugs hiding in his armor as Bugs evades yet another bat to the head (making Pantsalot strike his own head). Bugs applies a needle to Pantsalot 's posterior, causing him to jump and smash into an arch before smashing back into his armor. Bugs unscrews the helmet and remarks "Look at the new Dick Tracy character, Accordion Head!". Bugs is then chased into a manhole, and before Pantsalot can dive in, Bugs puts the lid on, causing yet another head blow to Pantsalot.

Bugs, thinking he has won, prepares to leave ("I guess I'd better go phone Lady Windermere not to expect her spouse home for dinner"), but the knights, led by Pantsalot, reappear in formation to joust together against Bugs. Bugs calls a timeout and builds a glass and cast-iron steam case resembling a tank and a bomber in a nearby blacksmith shop to house himself, his pony, and lance. After emerging, Bugs and the knights charge to each other and end up (off-screen) crashing into each other, rattling the crowd.

The cartoon ends with Bugs as "The Smiling Rabbit", selling all of the defeated knights' suits of armor and disposing of another carrot in what was Pantsalot's suit ("Ehh, So it shouldn't be a total loss.").

== Analysis ==
While a parody of the Arthurian legend, the short avoids using familiar names. The ending, however, is clearly based on the final fight in A Connecticut Yankee in King Arthur's Court (1889), where the knights of England attack the protagonist en masse and fall to him. It is a battle between modern American technology and old English ways. The narrative of the film never explains the arrival of Bugs in this time period. He is simply there. Yet his American ways have a calamitous effect, as did those of Hank Morgan in the original novel, giving this short a dark side.

The film also evokes images of the post-war era. For example, the pavilion of Bugs is a military surplus tent with the markings of the United States Army. There are references to Errol Flynn, popular films, Dick Tracy, speakeasies, and bombers.

The jousting field is depicted as a typical sports field transferred to the Middle Ages. There is an announcer, a vendor selling programs, a football field, and references to baseball, boxing, and pool. There is also an appearance by a kazoo-using marching band at half-time.

The first half of the joust consists of three passes each ending in defeat for Bugs. In the first two, he is sent flying into a wall. In the third and last, he shatters his lance. The second half of the joust is a free-for-all, making use of multiple weapons. In an opening sequence, the two combatants smash each other with clubs to the tune of I've Been Working on the Railroad.

== See also ==
- Bugs Bunny filmography
- Looney Tunes and Merrie Melodies filmography (1940–1949)

== Sources ==
- Salda, Michael N. (1999), ""What's Up, Duke?" Arthurian Animation", in Harty, Kevin J. (ed.), King Arthur on Film: New Essays on Arthurian Cinema, McFarland & Company, ISBN 9780786401529
- Salda, Michael N. (2013), ""To Ye Jousting Tournament":Arthur's Postwar Rise", Arthurian Animation: A Study of Cartoon Camelots on Film and Television, McFarland & Company, ISBN 9781476606149

Preceded by Long-Haired Hare	Bugs Bunny Cartoons; 1949	Succeeded by The Grey Hounded Hare
