= Mohammad Ali Bashe Ahangar =

Iranian director and screenwriter

- محمدعلی باشه‌آهنگر
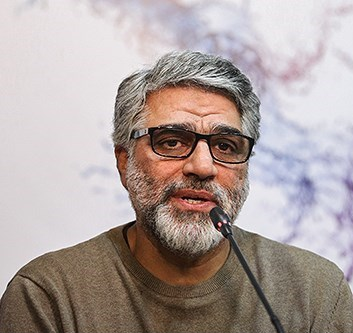
- Born: Mohammad Ali Bashe Ahangar; December 8, 1962 (age 63); Dezfoul, Iran
- Occupations: Film director Screenwriter

Mohammad Ali Bashe Ahangar (Persian: محمدعلی باشه‌آهنگر; also Romanized as Mohammad-Ali Bashe Ahangar) (born 1962) is an Iranian director and screenwriter.

== Filmography ==
- The Lost Half (نیمهٔ گمشده), 1998
- Sugar Solution (نبات داغ), 2003
- The Child of Dust (فرزند خاک), 2007
- Dreams Awakened (بیداری رؤیاها), 2010
- The Queen (ملکه), 2012
- Under Water Cypress (سرو زیر آب), 2018
- Cinema metropol (سینما متروپل), 2022
