= Farhad Najafi =

Iranian film director

- فرهاد نجفی
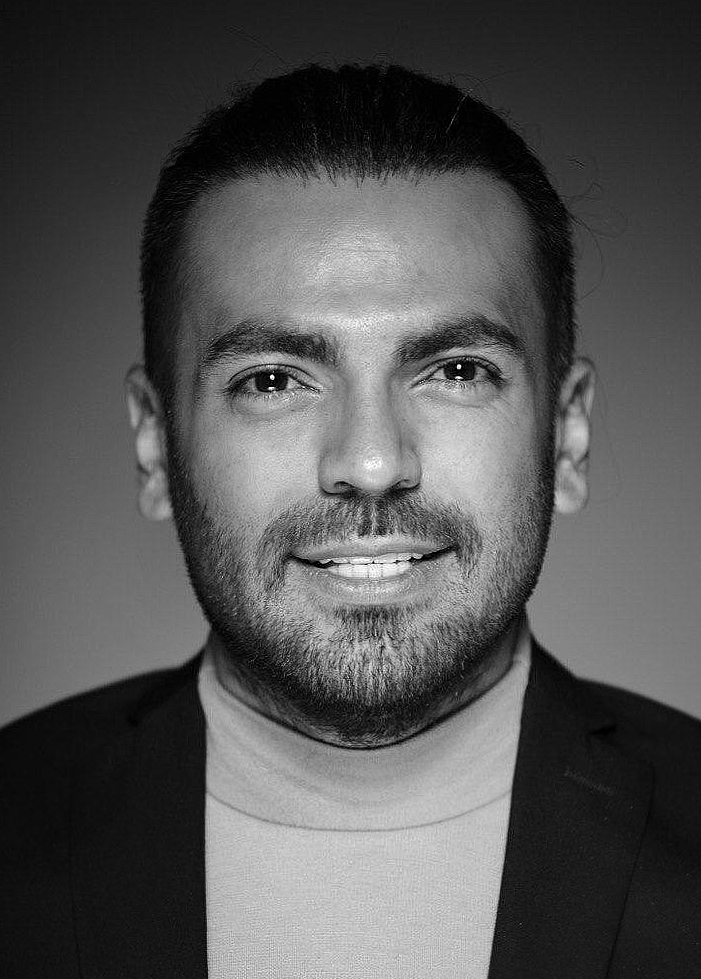
- Born: 16 October 1987 (age 38)
- Occupations: Director, screenwriter, producer
- Years active: 2001–present

Farhad Najafi (Persian: فرهاد نجفی) is an Iranian film director, screenwriter and movie producer.

== Filmography as director ==
=== Cinema ===
Year	English title	Original title	Transliteration	Award
2019	One Night in Tehran	بعد از تو	Ba'ad Az To	Jury Award for Best Feature Film at the Milestone World Film Festival; Jury Award for Best Feature Film at the Queen Palm International Film Festival; Nominated for Best Feature Film at the White Unicorn International Film Festival; Nominated for Best Feature Film at Festival de Cinema de Alter do Chão; Nominated for Best Feature Film at DIRECTORS CUT INT'L FILM FESTIVAL
2014	Room Number Zero	چارسو	Charsoo	
2007	First Move	حرکت اول	Harakate Aval	

=== Series ===
Year	English title	Original title	Transliteration
2016	Aspirin	آسپرین	Aspirin
2013	Matador	ماتادور	Matador
