= Iranian Film Festival Australia =

- Location: Melbourne, Sydney, Perth, Brisbane, Adelaide
- Founded: 2011
- Festival date: May–July
- Language: Persian; English
- Website: iffa.net.au

Iranian Film Festival Australia (IFFA) is a film festival held in Australia with a focus on Iranian films.

IFFA was founded in 2011, and is the only nationwide festival in Australia dedicated to Iranian films.

The 9th festival was also hosted by Mercury CX in Adelaide in 2019.

In IFFA 2016, the film Life and a Day by Saeed Roostaee won the Network for the Promotion of Asian Cinema Award.
