= Dough for the Do-Do =

1949 Warner Bros. animated film short

- Title card
- Directed by: Friz Freleng
- Based on: Porky in Wackyland and Tin Pan Alley Cats by Bob Clampett
- Starring: Mel Blanc
- Music by: Carl Stalling
- Color process: Cinecolor (two-strip, original); Technicolor (three-strip, re-release)
- Production company: Warner Bros. Cartoons
- Distributed by: Warner Bros. Pictures; The Vitaphone Corporation
- Release dates: September 2, 1949 (original); April 6, 1957 (re-release)
- Running time: 7:04
- Language: English

Dough for the Do-Do is a 1949 Warner Bros. Merrie Melodies cartoon directed by an uncredited Friz Freleng. It was released on September 2, 1949, and stars Porky Pig. The short is a remake of Bob Clampett's 1938 cartoon Porky in Wackyland, as well as using footage from his 1943 cartoon Tin Pan Alley Cats.

== Plot ==
The cartoon begins with a newspaper showing Porky traveling to Africa to hunt the rare dodo bird. Porky flies his airplane to go to Dark Africa, then Darker Africa, and finally lands in Darkest Africa. When Porky lands, a sign tells him that he's in Wackyland ("Population: 100 nuts and a squirrel"), while a scary voice booms out "It can happen here!" Porky enters into a surreal Dalí-esque landscape and encounters many strange, weird, and oafish creatures, including a three-headed goon whose heads resemble a pawn brokers sign with the faces of the Three Stooges.

Suddenly, the last dodo of the dodo species appears. Porky tries to catch the dodo, but the dodo plays tricks on him. At one time, the dodo appears on the Warner Bros. shield and sling shots Porky into the ground. Finally, Porky dresses as another dodo and announces that he is the last dodo, worth six trillion dollars. The dodo handcuffs himself to Porky, claiming "I've got the last Dodo!" and runs with Porky to claim the reward. Porky reveals himself, and still handcuffed to the dodo, runs off with him, now proclaiming: "Oh, no, you haven't! I-I'm rich! I-I've got the last D-D-Dodo!" Once they disappear over the horizon, a bunch more dodos appear to say that Porky does indeed have the last dodo.

== See also ==
- Porky Pig filmography
- Looney Tunes and Merrie Melodies filmography (1940–1949)
