= Porky in Wackyland =

1938 cartoon by Robert Clampett

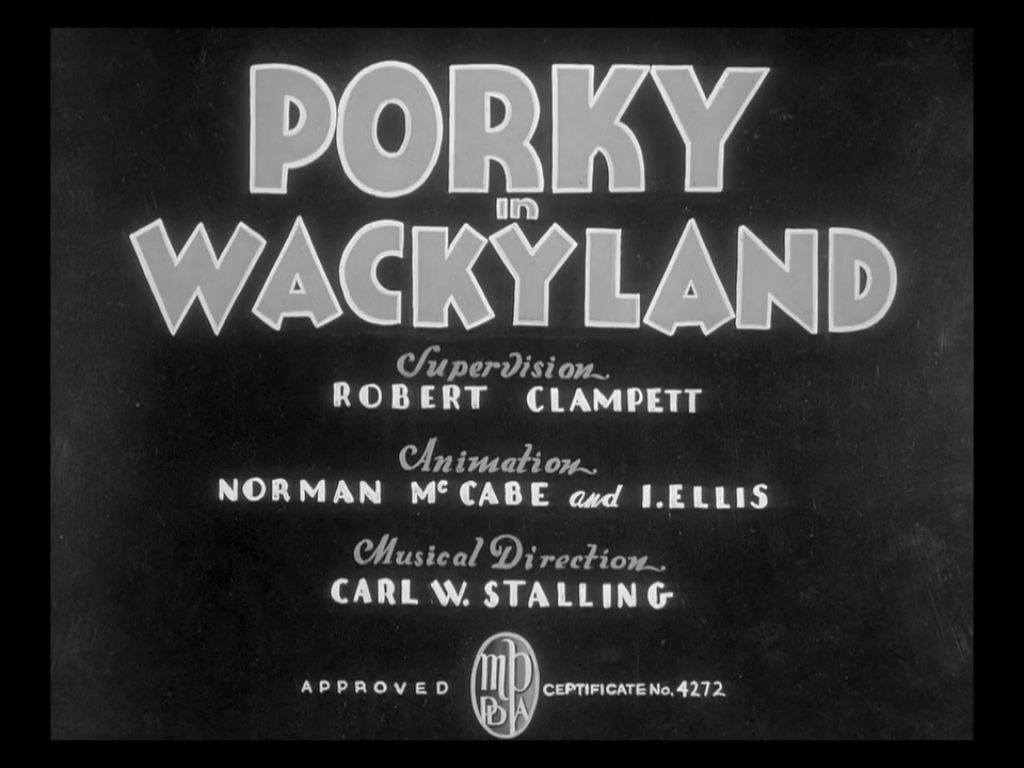
- Title card
- Directed by: Robert Clampett
- Produced by: Leon Schlesinger
- Starring: Mel Blanc; Billy Bletcher; Tedd Pierce; Danny Webb; Bob Clampett
- Edited by: Treg Brown
- Music by: Carl W. Stalling
- Animation by: Norman McCabe; Isadore Ellis
- Production company: Leon Schlesinger Productions
- Distributed by: Warner Bros. Pictures; The Vitaphone Corporation
- Release date: September 24, 1938
- Running time: 7 min
- Country: United States
- Language: English

Porky in Wackyland is a 1938 American animated comedy short film directed by Robert Clampett. The short was released on September 24, 1938. It is part of the Looney Tunes series and the 46th cartoon to feature Porky Pig.

In 1994, Porky in Wackyland was voted No. 8 of The 50 Greatest Cartoons of all time by members of the animation field. In 2000, it was deemed "culturally, historically, or aesthetically significant" by the United States Library of Congress, which selected the short for preservation in the National Film Registry.

== Plot ==
Porky Pig travels to Africa to hunt for the last do-do bird, in an attempt to win a bounty of $4 trillion. Upon landing his airplane in Darkest Africa, Porky sees a sign telling him that he is in Wackyland, where anything can happen. He tiptoes along the ground in his airplane and is greeted by a roaring beast, who suddenly becomes effeminate and dances away into the forest.

A musical interlude introduces several more bizarre creatures that inhabit Wackyland's impossible landscape. These include a one-man band that plays its nose like a flute, a rabbit swinging in midair, a duck caricature of Al Jolson, and a beast with the heads of the Three Stooges. One creature wears a sandwich board advertising information about the do-do. The creature beckons Porky into a dark passage, where he falls down a chute and watches the do-do's big entrance. The do-do introduces itself and then tramples Porky while scat singing. Porky gives chase, but the do-do repeatedly uses surreal tricks to escape and humiliate him.

Some time later, the do-do encounters a newspaper hawker announcing that Porky's hunt has been a success. Confused by the news, the do-do drops its guard long enough for the hawker (Porky in disguise) to grab it. Porky briefly celebrates catching the last do-do, but is bested again when the bird calls for its other do-do friends.

== Voice cast ==
- Mel Blanc as Porky Pig / Dodo / Dodo's Relatives / The Newsboy / Wackyland Resident (one line: "That-away!") / Roaring Goon ("Boo! La-La-La")
  - Billy Bletcher as the Roaring Goon (growling noises)
- Tedd Pierce as Al Jolson Duck ("Mammy! Mammy!") / Mysterious Announcer (one line: "Introducing... In Person... The Dodo.")
- Shirley Reed as The Foo (one line: "Hello, Bobo")
- Danny Webb as Mysterious Voice (one line: "It CAN Happen Here!") / The Prisoner
- Bob Clampett as vocal effects

== Reception ==
Steve Schneider's 1998 That's All Folks! The Art of Warner Bros. Animation writes that with this short, "the lord of cartoon misrule, Clampett established conclusively that in animation, realism is irrelevant".

In the 2001 Masters of Animation, John Grant writes that "this short, in its cumulative effect, is more wildly inventive than anything even [Tex] Avery had produced for Warners".

Animation historian Steve Schneider writes, "No mere Looney Tune, Porky in Wackyland was Warner Bros. Emancipation Proclamation. Building on the creaky liberties inaugurated by director Tex Avery, here Bob Clampett scoffs and shreds the conventions — realism, literalism, infantilism, cutesiness, and worse — that, with the ascendancy of Disney, had come to caramelize cartooning. By reminding us of animations' horizons — namely, none at all — this anything-goes film illustrates Sigmund Freud's notion that humor arises from breaking taboos. And breaking taboos is something that animation, with its limitless freedom, is uniquely gifted to do".

== Follow-ups and derivative works ==
Near-identical moments from Porky in Wackyland and its color remake, Dough for the Do-Do.

Much of the Wackyland sequence was adapted and reused by Clampett for inclusion in his 1943 short Tin Pan Alley Cats. A color remake of Porky in Wackyland was supervised by Friz Freleng in 1948. Re-titled as Dough for the Do-Do, the remake was released in 1949. The films were nearly identical, in many cases appearing to match frame-by-frame in certain details, albeit with Porky's appearance updated (by redoing most of the animation of the character), the voices having evolved (with less use of speeding-up) and the backgrounds being changed to a surreal, Daliesque landscape. Dough for the Do-Do was produced in Technicolor, but was originally released in Cinecolor due to a dispute with the Technicolor corporation. Later reissues were printed by Technicolor.

There were at least two Terrytoons plagiarizations of Porky in Wackyland in the 1940s or 1950s. Dingbat Land (1949) starred Gandy Goose and Sourpuss. The role of the Do-Do was taken by a minor Terrytoons character, Dingbat.

Tex Avery, for whom Clampett worked as an animator in the mid-1930s, borrowed strongly from this cartoon for his 1948 MGM cartoons Half-Pint Pygmy (in which the characters, George and Junior, travel to Africa in search of the world's smallest pygmy, only to discover that he has an uncle who's even smaller) and The Cat That Hated People (where the cat travels to the moon and encounters an array of characters similar to those in Clampett's Wackyland, e.g., a pair of gloves and lips that keep saying "Mammy, mammy", just like the Al Jolson duck in Porky in Wackyland). Clampett would again use the Three Stooges parody when a later creation of his, Beany and Cecil, faced the "Dreaded Three-Headed Threep".

According to writer Paul Dini, the Do-Do Bird is the father of Gogo Dodo, a character on the 1990s animated TV series Tiny Toon Adventures, and a second Wackyland is drawn into Acme Acres by Babs and Buster Bunny. A small clip from the film was used in a Slappy Squirrel segment on another Warners animated TV series of the 1990s, Animaniacs. The segment, titled "Critical Condition", featured Porky in Wackyland as part of a fake LaserDisc release. The Do-Do Bird has made occasional guest spots in the DC Comics Looney Tunes comic book, being colored in grayscale as opposed to the rest of the art being in color. The character makes an appearance in the 2007 Wii game Looney Tunes: Acme Arsenal as an unplayable character. He is given a first name, Yoyo Dodo. Yoyo can also be seen at Maroon Cartoon Studios as a brief cameo during the beginning of the 1988 film Who Framed Roger Rabbit. Yoyo also made a cameo in the 2020 Looney Tunes Cartoons short "Happy Birthday, Bugs Bunny!" and plays a large role in the stop motion episode "Daffy in Wackyland". Yoyo made a brief cameo appearance in the 2026 film Coyote vs. Acme as one of the ACME corporation's secret experiments during Bugs Bunny's story.

== See also ==
- Looney Tunes and Merrie Melodies filmography (1930–1939)
- Looney Tunes and Merrie Melodies filmography (1940–1949)
- Looney Tunes Golden Collection Porky in Wackyland on Volume 2 (Disc 3) and Dough for the Do-Do on Volume 1 (Disc 2)
- Looney Tunes Platinum Collection: Volume 2
- Porky Pig 101
- Porky Pig filmography
