= Wales International Film Festival =

Film festival held in Neath, Wales, since 2017

- Location: Gwyn Hall, Neath
- Founded: 2017
- Festival date: May–July
- Language: English
- Website: walesfilmfestival.com

Wales International Film Festival (WalesIFF) is a film festival held in Gwyn Hall in Neath, Wales. It was founded in 2017 by Euros Jones-Evans and Samira Mohamed Ali.
