= Tin Pan Alley Cats =

1943 film by Bob Clampett

- Title card
- Directed by: Bob Clampett
- Story by: Warren Foster
- Produced by: Leon Schlesinger
- Starring: Mel Blanc
- Music by: Carl W. Stalling
- Animation by: Rod Scribner
- Color process: Technicolor
- Production company: Leon Schlesinger Productions
- Distributed by: Warner Bros. Pictures
- Release date: July 17, 1943
- Running time: 7 min
- Country: United States
- Language: English

Tin Pan Alley Cats is a 1943 American animated comedy short film directed by Bob Clampett. It is part of the Merrie Melodies series and a follow-up to Clampett's successful Coal Black and de Sebben Dwarfs, released earlier in 1943. Tin Pan Alley Cats focuses upon contemporary themes of African-American culture, jazz music, and World War II, and features a caricature of jazz musician Fats Waller as an anthropomorphic cat. The short's centerpiece is a fantasy sequence derived from Clampett's black and white Looney Tunes short Porky in Wackyland (1938).

Like Coal Black, Tin Pan Alley Cats focuses heavily on stereotypical gags, character designs, and situations involving African-Americans. As such, the film and other Warner Bros. cartoons with similar themes have been withheld from television distribution since 1968, and are collectively known as the Censored Eleven.

== Plot ==
The cartoon opens with a cat who resembles Fats Waller crosses a storefront with two doors, one entering the Kit Kat Klub and the other the Uncle Tomcat Mission. A missionary warns the cat of "wine, women and song" if he goes in the club. This, however, only excites the cat ("Wine women an' song? What's de motor wid dat?") who immediately runs in. At first, he enjoys the club, but he becomes so immersed in the music that he is carried "out-of-this-world" to Wackyland, where giant caricatures of Adolf Hitler, Hideki Tojo and Joseph Stalin frighten him so much that, when he wakes up, he gives up his partying ways and joins the mission band to their surprise.

== Production ==
In part because of budget limitations and wartime shortages, several sequences borrow animation and audio recordings from earlier Schlesinger cartoons. From Friz Freleng's "products come to life" Merrie Melodies short, September In The Rain (1937), the recorded performance of "Nagasaki" is re-used completely intact, and the "Fats Waller" cat, "Louis Armstrong" trumpeter, jitterbugging woman and the trio of singing bartenders are re-purposed for this cartoon. Gags from the "out-of-this-world" sequence feature color-redrawn versions of characters and visuals (along with re-recorded audio segments) from Clampett's 1938 Porky in Wackyland.

Segments specifically created for the nightmare sequence (such as the "Rubber (musical) Band" made up of rubber bands) would resurface in Friz Freleng's 1949 color remake of Porky in Wackyland, Dough for the Do-Do.

== Reception ==
Motion Picture Herald (July 17, 1943): "The trumpet notes of a night club musician are a little too much for Leon Schlesinger's cat and like so many of the present-day jitterbugs, he's sent "out of this world." When he gets there, however, he's happy to return to earth's solid soil for the weird land of phantasy is not all it's cracked up to be. Music and laughs are combined in a pleasant Technicolor cartoon."

Author and music critic Will Friedwald writes, "Tin Pan Alley Cats is an animated equivalent to the live-action features Stormy Weather (1943) and Cabin in the Sky (1943), which represented both the climax and the conclusion of the all-black Hollywood musical spectacular... The only thing that's the matter is that Tin Pan Alley Cats represents a near last stand for both black characters and extended musical numbers in the Hollywood cartoon."

== Home media ==
Following the Civil Rights Movement of the 1960s, United Artists withheld Tin Pan Alley Cats, along with the rest of the "Censored Eleven", from American television in 1968. Turner Entertainment Co. (today owned by Warner Bros. Discovery) acquired the rights to these cartoons in 1986. Current copyright owner Warner Bros. Pictures continued to withhold it from release.

Of the cartoons included in the Censored Eleven, animation historians and film scholars are quickest to defend the two directed by Bob Clampett: Coal Black and de Sebben Dwarfs and Tin Pan Alley Cats. The former, a jazz-based parody of Walt Disney's Snow White and the Seven Dwarfs, is frequently included on lists of the greatest cartoons ever made, while the latter is a hot jazz re-interpretation of Clampett's short Porky in Wackyland (1938). Author Michelle Klein-Hass wrote the following:

Some even look at Clampett's Jazz cartoons and cry racism when Clampett was incredibly ahead of his time and was a friend to many of the greats of the LA jazz scene. All of the faces you see in Tin Pan Alley Cats and Coal Black and de Sebben Dwarfs are caricatures of real musicians he hung out with at the Central Avenue jazz and blues clubs of the '40s.

Bootleg copies have surfaced on videotape and DVD. Warner Home Video has issued restored clips of the film as a part of a supplementary documentary on Bob Clampett on disc three of the Looney Tunes Golden Collection: Volume 2 DVD collector's set. In October 2010, it was announced that a complete version would be officially released, along with the rest of the "Censored Eleven", on DVD through the Warner Archive Collection. However, none of the "Censored Eleven" have been officially released since then.
