= Bugs =

Bugs may refer to:

- Plural of bug

== Arts, entertainment and media ==
=== Fictional characters ===
- Bugs Bunny, a character
- Bugs Meany, a character in the Encyclopedia Brown books

=== Films ===
- Bugs (2003 film), a science-fiction-horror film
- Bugs (2014 film), a science fiction disaster thriller film

=== Television ===
- Bugs (TV series), a UK television series from the 1990s
- Bugs!, an American animated series, also known as Wabbit/New Looney Tunes
- "Bugs" (Supernatural), an episode of the television series Supernatural
- "Bugs", an episode of Blue's Clues

=== Other media ===
- "Bugs" (Pearl Jam song), a Pearl Jam song from the album Vitalogy
- Bugs (Theodore Roszak), a novel
- Bugs! (streaming service), often stylized as SUPER SOUND Bugs!, a South Korean subscription digital streaming service

== Other uses ==
- Bugs (nickname)
- Bayesian inference using Gibbs sampling, a software package
- Birmingham University Guild of Students, the former name of the University of Birmingham Guild of Students

== See also ==
- Bug (disambiguation)
- Bugsy (disambiguation)
- Bugz, a former member of the rap group D-12
