= Bug =

Bug or BUG may refer to:

== Common uses ==
- A terrestrial arthropod animal, usually with at least six legs
  - Insect, a class of six-legged arthropods
    - Hemiptera, an order of insects called true bugs
- Volkswagen Beetle, an automobile nicknamed the "Bug"
- A colloquialism for most minibeasts including arthropods, gastropods and worms
- Covert listening device, used in surveillance and espionage
- Bug (engineering), a defect in an engineered system
  - Software bug
  - Hardware bug
  - BUG (tag), a computer programming comment tag
- Score bug, overlaid display of information in a sports broadcast
- Pathogen, colloquially
- A slang term for annoying someone

== Arts, entertainment and media ==
=== Fictional entities ===
- Bug (Marvel Comics), a superhero in Marvel Comics
- Bug (DC Comics), different characters appearing in DC Comics
- Bug (Starship Troopers), an alien race from the novel and film
- Bug, Michael Lee's younger brother in The Wire
- Bug, in the TV series WordWorld
- Bobby "Bug" Guthrie, in the TV series Life Unexpected

=== Film and television ===
- Bug (1975 film), an American horror film
- Bug (2002 film), an American comedy film
- Bug (2006 film), a psychological horror film adaptation of the Tracy Letts play
- Bug, a 2017 film starring Gene Jones
- "Bug" (Breaking Bad), a 2011 TV episode

=== Gaming ===
- Bug (poker), a limited form of wild card
- Bug, a Pokémon type
- Bug!, a 1995 video game
- Bughouse chess, or bug, a chess variant played on two boards

=== Music ===
==== Albums ====
- Bug (Dinosaur Jr. album), 1988
- Bug (Dave Davies album), 2002
- Bug (soundtrack), of the 2006 film
- Bug (Kacy Hill album), 2024

==== Songs ====
- "Bug", a song by Feeder from the 2001 album Echo Park
- "Bug", a song by Fontaines D.C. from the 2024 album Romance
- "Bug", a song by Lower Than Atlantis from the 2011 album World Record
- "Bug", a song by Phish from the 2000 album Farmhouse
- "The Bug", a 1992 song by Dire Straits

=== Other uses in arts, entertainment and media ===
- Bug (magazine), a Croatian magazine
- Bug (play), by Tracy Letts, 1993

== Businesses and organizations ==
- Bicycle User Group, a group set up to promote cycling issues
- Bug Multisystem, an Israeli consumer electronics retail company

== People ==
- Bug Hall (born 1985), an American actor
- Bug Holliday (1867–1910), an American baseball player
- Bug Howard (born 1994), an American football player
- Amy Bug, American physicist
- Enric Bug (born 1957), pseudonym Bug Rogers, a Spanish comic book artist and industrial designer
- The Bug (musician), a recording alias for British musician Kevin Martin

== Places ==
- Bug (river) or Western Bug, a river in Poland, Ukraine and Belarus
- Southern Bug, Southern Buh or Boh, a river in Ukraine
- Bug (Rügen), a spit and former village on the island of Rügen in Mecklenburg-Western Pomerania, Germany
- Bug, Kentucky, a settlement in Clinton County, Kentucky, in the US
- Bag, Qasr-e Qand, also called Būg, a village in Sistan and Baluchestan Province, Iran

== Science and technology ==
- Slipper lobster (Scyllaridae), a number of species of which are called "bug"
- Bug, a digital on-screen graphic of a broadcaster's logo
- Bug, a Morse key design by Vibroplex
- Bug algorithm, a pathfinding algorithm especially for wheeled robot
- Web beacon or web bug, a tracking object embedded in a web page or e-mail

== Transportation ==
- Bond Bug, a British three-wheeled car
- Dudly Bug, an early gas-powered cyclecar
- Sandlin Bug, an American ultralight glider design
- Bug railway station, in Pakistan
- Bagaha railway station, Bihar, a railway station in India, station code BUG
- Burgess Hill railway station, a railway station in Sussex, England

== Other uses ==
- Buginese language, ISO 639 language code bug
- The Bug (horse) (1943–1963), an Irish-bred Thoroughbred racehorse
- Travel Bug, a trackable item used in Geocaching

== See also ==
- Bugg (disambiguation)
- Bugged (disambiguation)
- Bugs (disambiguation)
- Annoyance, an unpleasant mental state
- Pathogen, an organism that causes disease
- Dudley Bug, an extinct trilobite
- Debugging, in computer programming and software development
- Union label or union bug, a label marking a product made by union workers
