= Buggs =

Buggs is a surname. Notable people with the surname include:

- Danny Buggs (born 1953), American football player
- Isaiah Buggs (born 1997), American football player
- Marcus Buggs (born 1985), American football player

== See also ==
- Bugg (surname)
