= List of New Looney Tunes episodes =

This is a list of episodes of the American animated television series New Looney Tunes. The show premiered on September 21, 2015 on Cartoon Network and October 5, 2015 on Boomerang.

== Series overview ==
Season	Episodes	Originally released		
Season	Episodes	First released	Last released	Network
1	52	September 21, 2015	February 8, 2018	Cartoon Network (episodes 1–22); Boomerang (episodes 23–52); Boomerang SVOD
2	52	February 8, 2018	January 31, 2019	Boomerang SVOD; Boomerang
3	52	August 29, 2019	January 30, 2020	Boomerang SVOD; Boomerang

== Episodes ==
=== Season 1: Wabbit/Bugs! (2015–18) ===
No. overall	No. in season	Title	Directed by	Written by	Storyboarded by	Original release date	US viewers (millions)
1a	1a	"Buddha Bugs"	Erik Kuska	Erik Kuska and Jason Plapp	Dan Root	September 21, 2015	1.24
After Yosemite Sam robs a Buddhist temple, he searches for the greatest of riches after encountering Bugs, who poses as a monk.
1b	1b	"Now and Zen"	Erik Kuska	Roger Eschbacher	Joseph Adams	September 21, 2015	1.24
Bugs and Squeaks face off with ninjas after Squeaks inadvertently disturbs their peace while gathering acorns.
2a	2a	"The Inside Bugs"	Scott Bern	Josie Campbell	Rafael Rosado	September 21, 2015	1.24
Sam robs a bank and finds an unusual getaway driver in the form of Bugs.
2b	2b	"Sun Valley Freeze"	Erik Kuska	Richard Pursel	Luke Brookshier	September 21, 2015	1.24
Bugs winds up on a snowy mountain where he helps protect a dimwitted Bigfoot from the Hazmats.
3a	3a	"St. Bugs and the Dragon"	Scott Bern	Kevin Fleming and Rob Janas	Michael Ruocco	September 22, 2015	1.08
Bugs and Squeaks hide a dragon from the knight Sir Littlechin, who is looking for a dragon to slay.
3b	3b	"Leaf It Alone"	Scott Bern	John Infantino	Celia Kendrick	September 22, 2015	1.08
Wile E. Coyote tries extreme ways to get a stubborn leaf off his lawn. Note: The Road Runner makes a cameo as a bird bath statue and on a wanted poster.
4a	4a	"The Bigfoot in Bed"	Scott Bern	Erik Kuska	David "Pez" Hofmann	September 22, 2015	1.08
Bigfoot is educated in manners by Bugs.
4b	4b	"World Wide Wabbit"	Scott Bern	John Infantino	Rafael Rosado	September 22, 2015	1.08
Sam escapes from prison and forces Bugs to infiltrate the Internet to steal money.
5a	5a	"For the Love of Acorns"	Scott Bern	Josie Campbell	Joseph Adams	September 23, 2015	1.16
Bugs helps Squeaks find his acorns buried in a baseball field and competes against a baseball player named Cal.
5b	5b	"The Game Is a Foot"	Scott Bern	Justin Becker and Steve Clemmons	Greg Araya	September 23, 2015	1.16
Bugs meets a leprechaun named Shameless O'Scanty, who wants his lucky rabbit's feet.
6a	6a	"The Grim Rabbit"	Erik Kuska	Erik Kuska	Dan Root	September 24, 2015	1.38
The Grim Rabbit appears looking to put an end to Bugs' life.
6b	6b	"The Wringer"	Scott Bern	Thomas Krajewski	Dan Root	September 24, 2015	1.38
Sam mistakes Bugs for an impersonator he hired to do bad things to people and make them run the real Bugs out of town, but Bugs manages to trick Sam into doing these things to himself.
7a	7a	"White House Wabbit"	Sean Petrilak	Bill Kopp	Joseph Adams	September 25, 2015	0.96
Bugs visits Washington, D.C. for the grand opening of the White House carrot garden and meets the hapless Vice President Leslie P. Lilylegs, who tries to catch Bugs in order to impress the President.
7b	7b	"Bugsbarian"	Jessica Borutski	Matt Craig	Rafael Rosado	September 25, 2015	0.96
Bugs and Squeaks meet a tough barbarian and his polar bear Krakos who have arrived in their forest.
8a	8a	"Not Lyin' Lion"	Sean Petrilak	Miles Hindman and Derek Iversen	Erik Knutson	September 28, 2015	0.89
Bugs and Squeaks travel to Africa to meet Squeaks' naked mole-rat cousin Snorts by a water hole, but they run into a hungry lion by the name of King Thes.
8b	8b	"Ice Ice Bunny"	Scott Bern	Sean Godsey and Matt Craig	Erik Knutson	September 28, 2015	0.89
On the first day of summer, Bugs goes down by the watering hole to relax. Unfortunately, a snow deer called the Winter Stag turns the forest into a winter wonderland.
9a	9a	"Wabbit's Wild"	Scott Bern	Kevin Kramer	Michael Ruocco	September 29, 2015	1.23
Squeaks and his poker buddies have their poker night in Bugs' house, where Bugs deals with Shifty the Squirrel.
9b	9b	"All Belts Are Off"	Scott Bern	Jason Plapp	Dan Root	September 29, 2015	1.23
Sam holds up a men's clothing store to get a new belt.
10a	10a	"Wabbit's Best Friend"	Erik Kuska	Richard Pursel	Andy Gonsalves	September 30, 2015	1.19
Bugs and Squeaks meet Jack the Dog Trainer, who cannot stand rabbits.
10b	10b	"Annoying Ex-Boydfriend"	Sean Petrilak	John Loy	Dan Root	September 30, 2015	1.19
A sleepy Bugs helps a serenading bird named Boyd, who is trying to win his girlfriend back.
11a	11a	"Bugs vs. Snail"	Scott Bern	Joey Clift	Erik Knutson	October 1, 2015	1.14
Bugs orders a kite online, but the delivery snail refuses to let him outside to play with it until he receives a tip. Note: Foghorn Leghorn makes an appearance in this episode.
11b	11b	"To Catch a Fairy"	Sean Petrilak	Erik Kuska	Celia Kendrick	October 1, 2015	1.14
Bugs seeks revenge when he wakes up to discover all of his teeth were taken by the Tooth Fairy.
12a	12a	"Bugs in the Garden"	Scott Bern	Erik Kuska	Joseph Adams	October 2, 2015	1.24
Bugs and Wile E. compete in a garden grow-off.
12b	12b	"Scarecrow"	Scott Bern	Mr. Doug Lawrence and Matt Craig	Amber Hollinger	October 2, 2015	1.24
Bugs' GPS gets him lost in a cornfield, where he encounters a scatterbrained scarecrow trying to keep intruders out.
13a	13a	"Painter Paint Hare"	Erik Kuska	Erik Kuska	Michael Ruocco	October 8, 2015	1.25
Jack chases Bugs through the forest after he meddles in his new hobby, nature painting.
13b	13b	"The Spy Who Bugged Me"	Sean Petrilak	John McCann	Celia Kendrick	October 8, 2015	1.25
While sightseeing in Washington D.C., Bugs accidentally grabs a bag belonging to a spy named Claudette.
14a	14a	"Hareplane Mode"	Erik Kuska	Joseph Limbaugh	Amber Hollinger	October 15, 2015	0.70
Bugs poses as a phone store employee to get even with Sam for his distracted driving.
14b	14b	"Bugs of Steel"	Scott Bern	Kevin Fleming and Rob Janas	Michael Ruocco	October 15, 2015	0.70
Bugs and Squeaks try to expose fitness guru Rock Hardcase, who arrives in the forest to peddle his phony energy drink, Jock Juice.
15a	15a	"Big Troubles"	Scott Bern	Matt Craig	Celia Kendrick	October 22, 2015	0.53
Bugs and Squeaks discover a spray with the ability to enlarge things.
15b	15b	"Manner Maid"	Scott Bern	Michael Ludy	Erik Knutson	October 22, 2015	0.53
Bugs' peaceful day in the park is disrupted when he learns an authoritative robot has been employed to enforce the rules.
16a	16a	"Bugsfoot"	Scott Bern	Erik Kuska	Amber Hollinger	November 9, 2015 (Boomerang); February 6, 2016 (Cartoon Network)	1.19
Bugs and Bigfoot try to escape the Hazmat's base of operations where they actually succeed in catching them.
16b	16b	"Grim on Vacation"	Sean Petrilak	Erik Kuska and Jason Plapp	Erik Knutson	November 9, 2015 (Boomerang); February 6, 2016 (Cartoon Network)	1.19
While on vacation with his wife, Carl the Grim Rabbit finds it difficult to keep his mind off work when Bugs shows up.
17a	17a	"Carrot Before the Horse"	Scott Bern	Justin Becker and Steve; Clemmons	Amber Hollinger	November 16, 2015 (Boomerang); February 6, 2016 (Cartoon Network)	1.19
Bugs tries to outsmart Pampreen Perdy after she steals his carrots to feed to her horse.
17b	17b	"Trunk with Power"	Jessica Borutski	John McCann	Greg Araya	November 16, 2015 (Boomerang); February 6, 2016 (Cartoon Network)	1.19
On his way to the airport, Bugs encounters a Toll Tree who steals his luggage.
18a	18a	"Snow Wabbit"	Scott Bern	Rebecca Allen and Katie; Nahnsen	Celia Kendrick	November 23, 2015 (Boomerang); February 13, 2016 (Cartoon Network)	1.08
Bugs builds a snowman that comes to life and tries to steal his carrot to use for a nose. Note: This episode neither has dialogue nor sound effects.
18b	18b	"Aromatherapest"	Sean Petrilak	Matt Craig and Paul Dini	Celia Kendrick	November 23, 2015 (Boomerang); February 13, 2016 (Cartoon Network)	1.08
Bugs and Wile E. both get sprayed by a skunk and try different methods of getting rid of the stink.
19a	19a	"Raising Your Spirits"	Sean Petrilak	Matt Craig and Tom Minton	Erik Knutson	November 30, 2015 (Boomerang); February 20, 2016 (Cartoon Network)	0.90
Bugs tries to retrieve his bed sheet from a not-so-scary ghost.
19b	19b	"Dust Bugster"	Scott Bern	Amanda Blake Davis and Brendan Kelly	Rafael Rosado	November 30, 2015 (Boomerang); February 20, 2016 (Cartoon Network)	0.90
Bugs binge-watches a show that Porky Pig told him about, leaving him no time to clean his house until a giant dust bunny appears and takes over.
20a	20a	"Computer Bugs"	Scott Bern	Matt Craig and Marly Halpern- Graser	David "Pez" Hofmann	February 27, 2016	1.03
Bugs ventures into his computer to deal with a pesky virus who crashed his video game.
20b	20b	"Oil's Well That Ends Well"	Scott Bern	Matt Craig and Roger; Eschbacher	Joseph Adams	February 27, 2016	1.03
Ivana's plans to steal oil in the desert are pestered when Bugs, mistaking the oil field for the Burning Hare festival, arrives.
21a	21a	"Your Bunny or Your Life"	Scott Bern	Erik Kuska	Mike Ruocco	March 5, 2016	1.19
Bugs heads into town to buy Squeaks a lottery ticket, only to once again encounter the Grim Rabbit.
21b	21b	"Misjudgment Day"	Robb Pratt	Matt Craig and Stephen; Perlstein	Greg Araya	March 5, 2016	1.19
A seemingly unstoppable robot is sent from the future to destroy Bugs. Note: Michigan J. Frog makes a cameo appearance at the end of the episode.
22a	22a	"Splashwater Bugs"	Scott Bern	Kevin Fleming and Rob Janas	David "Pez" Hofmann	March 12, 2016	0.90
Bugs and Squeaks head to a water park for the day, only to see the obnoxious Slugsworthy the First threaten to spoil the fun.
22b	22b	"Fwee Wange Wabbit"	Sean Petrilak	John Infantino	Joseph Adams	March 12, 2016	0.90
Foodie Vera Vulture comes by Bugs' house when she realizes the only thing she has never eaten is a rabbit.
23a	23a	"Beaver Fever"	Scott Bern	Joseph Limbaugh	Amber Hollinger	April 26, 2016 (DVD); May 22, 2016 (Digital); April 28, 2017 (Boomerang SVOD)	N/A
Bugs and the other forest animals try to liberate the lake from the hard-nosed Squint Eatswood, who claims only beavers are allowed in.
23b	23b	"Coyote.Rabbit.Squirrel"	Sean Petrilak	Matt Craig, Erik Kuska, and Jason Plapp	Celia Kendrick	April 26, 2016 (DVD); May 22, 2016 (Digital); April 28, 2017 (Boomerang SVOD)	N/A
Chaos ensues when Squeaks accidentally finds himself in Wile E.'s home laboratory.
24a	24a	"Pain & Treasure"	Robb Pratt	Matt Craig and Robb Pratt	Dan Root	April 26, 2016 (DVD); May 22, 2016 (Digital); April 28, 2017 (Boomerang SVOD)	N/A
Sam forces Bugs to decipher a pirate treasure map written in Esperanto.
24b	24b	"Office Rocker"	Robb Pratt	Matt Craig and Robb Pratt	Erik Knutson	April 26, 2016 (DVD); May 22, 2016 (Digital); April 28, 2017 (Boomerang SVOD)	N/A
Bugs visits his old pal Theodore Tasmanian, now an overworked accountant and family man, at work to convince him to participate in Prank Week.
25a	25a	"Survivalist of the Fittest"	Scott Bern	Matt Craig	Mike Ruocco	April 26, 2016 (DVD); May 22, 2016 (Digital); April 28, 2017 (Boomerang SVOD)	N/A
Bugs meets survivalist Tad Tucker and pulls pranks on him in his own video about wilderness survival.
25b	25b	"The IMPoster"	Sean Petrilak	Matt Craig and Erik Moneypenny	Dan Root	April 26, 2016 (DVD); May 22, 2016 (Digital); April 28, 2017 (Boomerang SVOD)	N/A
On Halloween night, Bugs encounters a mischievous imp.
26a	26a	"Bugs Over Par"	Sean Petrilak	Frank Caeti	Joseph Adams	April 26, 2016 (DVD); May 22, 2016 (Digital); April 28, 2017 (Boomerang SVOD)	N/A
Bugs competes with Leslie P. Lilylegs in a game of golf.
26b	26b	"Fast Feud"	Sean Petrilak	Matt Craig and Thomas; Krajewski	Joseph Adams	April 26, 2016 (DVD); May 22, 2016 (Digital); April 28, 2017 (Boomerang SVOD)	N/A
Bugs gets a job at Happy Hartle's Hamburger Hut after Happy Hartle fires all of his other employees.
Boomerang Streaming Service
27a	27a	"Sir Little Chin, Griffin Hunter"	Sean Petrilak	Kevin Fleming and Rob Janas	Mike Ruocco	December 21, 2017	N/A
Sir Littlechin returns, and this time, Bugs and Squeaks must protect a playful griffin from his grasp.
27b	27b	"Bugs in Time"	Sean Petrilak	Matt Craig	Dan Root	December 21, 2017	N/A
Dr. Clovenhoof enlists Bugs to accompany him on the maiden voyage of his time machine.
28a	28a	"Airpork Security"	Sean Petrilak	Kevin Fleming and Rob Janas	David "Pez" Hofmann	December 21, 2017	N/A
Bugs is running late for a flight, and his efforts to get through airport security quickly are thwarted by Porky.
28b	28b	"Home a Clone"	Scott Bern	Martin Garcia	Scott Bern and Sean Petrilak	December 21, 2017	N/A
Dr. Clovenhoof uses Bugs as a guinea pig for his new cloning machine.
29a	29a	"Bugs on Ice"	Sean Petrilak	Kevin Fleming and Rob Janas	Celia Kendrick	December 21, 2017	N/A
Bugs and Squeaks' fun on the frozen lake are interrputed when a boastful ice skater named Viktor comes in.
29b	29b	"Bug Scouts"	Scott Bern	Josie Campbell and Matt Craig	David "Pez" Hofmann	December 21, 2017	N/A
Bugs helps a group of scouts outsmart Eagle Scout, their abusive leader.
30a	30a	"For Whom the Bugs Trolls"	Scott Bern	Justin Becker, Steve; Clemmons, and Matt Craig	Amber Hollinger	December 21, 2017	N/A
Two trolls try to capture Bugs to serve to their boss for dinner.
30b	30b	"To Beach His Own"	Scott Bern	Kyle Stafford	Sahin Ersöz	December 21, 2017	N/A
Competitive Slugsworthy the First disturbs Bugs and Squeaks' fun day at the beach.
31a	31a	"Five Star Bugs"	Robb Pratt and Erik Knutson	Kevin Fleming and Rob Janas	Joseph Adams	December 21, 2017	N/A
Bugs interferes when Leslie P. Lilylegs is charged with protecting a hotel's fancy new fountain.
31b	31b	"Yoga to Be Kidding Me"	Scott Bern	Matt Craig and Kevin Kramer	Amber Hollinger	December 21, 2017	N/A
Bugs is conned into joining Ivana's yoga class.
32a	32a	"Rabbits of the Lost Ark"	Robb Pratt and Erik Knutson	Kevin Fleming and Rob Janas	Dan Root	December 21, 2017	N/A
Sam and Bugs explore the booby-trap-laden Temple of King Nutininkommen in search of an ancient medallion.
32b	32b	"Appropriate Technology"	Robb Pratt and Erik Knutson	Celia Kendrick	Celia Kendrick	December 21, 2017	N/A
Wile E. shows Bugs his new fully automated home, but his primal instincts begin to emerge (including speaking with signs) when the power goes out.
33a	33a	"Pork in the Road"	Scott Bern	Matt Craig and David "Pez"; Hofmann	David "Pez" Hofmann	December 21, 2017	N/A
Bugs uses his new rideshare app to get to a party and winds up with Porky as a driver. Tensions rise when the two find themselves hopelessly lost.
33b	33b	"Squeaks Upon a Star"	Sean Petrilak	Matt Craig	Celia Kendrick	December 21, 2017	N/A
Squeaks' wish comes true that he and Bugs would switch sizes.
34a	34a	"Mile Hi Grub"	Robb Pratt and Erik Knutson	Erik Knutson	Erik Knutson	December 21, 2017	N/A
Bugs and Squeaks encounter the hungry King Thes on an airplane.
34b	34b	"Pole Position"	Sean Petrilak	Matt Craig	Erik Knutson	December 21, 2017	N/A
Bugs and Squeaks try to prove that they are worthy enough to be carved into Squint Eatswood's totem pole.
35a	35a	"Thirst Things First"	Scott Bern	Kevin Fleming and Rob Janas	Sahin Ersöz	December 21, 2017	N/A
Bugs finds it increasingly difficult to quench his thirst when water starts avoiding him. Note: This episode neither has dialogue nor sound effects.
35b	35b	"Bugs of Chance"	Scott Bern	Mike Ruocco	Mike Ruocco	December 21, 2017	N/A
Bugs tries to win Squeaks a stuffed acorn playing Shifty's rigged carnival games.
36a	36a	"Bugs for Mayor"	Sean Petrilak	Kevin Fleming and Rob Janas	Rafael Rosado	December 21, 2017	N/A
Bugs runs for Mayor against Squint Eatswood, who wants to kick all the animals, except beavers, out of the forest.
36b	36b	"The Lepra-Con"	Sean Petrilak	Amanda Barnes and Alexis; Notabartolo	Sahin Ersöz	December 21, 2017	N/A
Shameless O'Scanty finds himself out of luck again when Bugs takes his pot of gold to use in a cook off.
37a	37a	"Squeak Show"	Erik Knutson	Amanda Blake Davis and Brendan O. Kelly	Mike Ruocco	December 21, 2017	N/A
Bigfoot mistakes Squeaks for a cat and decides to take care of him.
37b	37b	"Rodeo Bugs"	Sean Petrilak	Joe Canale and Molly Erdman	Joseph Adams	December 21, 2017	N/A
Sam attempts to get the best of Bugs at a rodeo.
38a	38a	"Slugsworthy's Mega Mansion"	Scott Bern	Kevin Fleming and Rob Janas	Mike Ruocco	December 21, 2017	N/A
Bugs tries to evict his new neighbor, Slugsworthy, after he built his new mansion on top of Bugs' hole.
38b	38b	"Wile E.'s Walnuts"	Scott Bern	Paul Dini	Rafael Rosado	December 21, 2017	N/A
Bugs and Squeaks try to stop Wile E. from grinding up the forest's walnuts into fuel for his new machine.
39a	39a	"Just One of Those Days"	Sean Petrilak	Matt Craig	Erik Knutson	December 21, 2017	N/A
Bugs is forced to contend with Carl the Grim Rabbit, Shameless O'Scanty, Sir Littlechin, the Barbarian and Bigfoot all at once.
39b	39b	"Mooch Housin' Syndrome"	Scott Bern	Matt Craig and Dave Schwartz	Dave Schwartz	December 21, 2017	N/A
Wile E. is asked to look after Squeaks, who quickly takes advantage of the situation.
40a	40a	"Sir Littlechin, Unicorn Hunter"	Erik Knutson	Kevin Fleming and Rob Janas	David "Pez" Hofmann	February 8, 2018	N/A
Bugs and Squeaks try to protect a wish-granting unicorn from Sir Littlechin. Note: Merlin is mentioned in this episode.
40b	40b	"Erin Go Bugs"	Erik Knutson	Kevin Fleming and Rob Janas	Rafael Rosado	February 8, 2018	N/A
Shameless O. Scanty leads Bugs on a tour across Ireland, all the while trying to make off with his lucky rabbit's feet.
41a	41a	"Proud to Be a Coal Miner's Wabbit"	Erik Knutson	Matt Craig, Kevin Fleming, and Rob Janas	Rafael Rosado	February 8, 2018	N/A
Bugs' peace and quiet is disturbed when Sam starts drilling for coal.
41b	41b	"Cabin Fervor"	Sean Petrilak	Rebecca Sage Allen and Katie; Nahnsen	Celia Kendrick	February 8, 2018	N/A
Bugs and Squeaks are trapped in a snowed in cabin and fight over the last of the food.
42a	42a	"The Grand Barbari-yon"	Erik Knutson	Kevin Fleming and Rob Janas	Sahin Ersöz	February 8, 2018	N/A
Bugs tries to save the Grand Canyon when the Barbarian claims it for his own.
42b	42b	"Giant Rabbit Hunters"	Scott Bern	Joey Clift and Matt Craig	Rafael Rosado	February 8, 2018	N/A
Bugs deals with paranormal investigators searching for Bigfoot.
43a	43a	"Amusement Pork"	Scott Bern	Matt Craig, Kevin Fleming, and Rob Janas	David "Pez" Hofmann	February 8, 2018	N/A
Bugs and Porky ride a wild new roller coaster together.
43b	43b	"Now You See Me, Now You Still See Me"	Scott Bern	Joseph Limbaugh	Joseph Adams	February 8, 2018	N/A
Bugs convinces Dr. Clovenhoof to become a superhero after testing his new invisibility ray.
44a	44a	"'Tis the Seasoning"	Scott Bern	Matt Craig, Amanda Barnes, and Alexis Notabartolo	Robb Pratt	November 30, 2017	N/A
On the last shopping day before Christmas, Bugs races against Sam to obtain a special gift for Squeaks.
44b	44b	"Winter Blunderland"	Scott Bern	Matt Craig, Amanda Blake; Davis, and Brendan O. Kelly	Dan Root	November 30, 2017	N/A
Bugs tries to retrieve Squeaks' letter to Santa after it's pilfered by the Barbarian.
45a	45a	"Ear! We! Go!"	Scott Bern	Rebecca Sage Allen and Katie Nahnsen	Celia Kendrick	February 8, 2018	N/A
Bugs' ears develop a mind of their own when they overhear the music from a local dance party. Note: This episode has no dialogue, however unlike "Snow Rabbit" and "Thirst Things First", the sound effects weren't muted and Bugs is heard grunting.
45b	45b	"Hare Band"	Sean Petrilak	Matt Craig and Karen Graci	Dan Root and Sahin Ersöz	February 8, 2018	N/A
Bugs and Squeaks compete to see who can raise more money playing music on a street corner.
46a	46a	"Bugs in the Petting Zoo"	Erik Knutson	Matt Craig, Kevin Fleming, and Rob Janas	Joseph Adams	February 8, 2018	N/A
Elmer Fudd convinces Bugs to come live at his animal menagerie, which turns out to be more like a prison.
46b	46b	"Hawaiian Ice"	Sean Petrilak	Rebecca Sage Allen and Katie; Nahnsen	Sharon Forward	February 8, 2018	N/A
Bugs' Hawaiian vacation is disturbed when the heat-hating Winter Stag arrives.
47a	47a	"Quiet the Undertaking"	Scott Bern	Robby Wells	Rafael Rosado	February 8, 2018	N/A
Bugs inadvertently bonds with Carl the Grim Rabbit when they are accidentally locked in a science museum overnight.
47b	47b	"Bugs Bunny?"	Erik Knutson	Kevin Fleming and Rob Janas	Celia Kendrick	February 8, 2018	N/A
Bugs undergoes a series of tests to prove to a group of rabbits that he is one of them.
48a	48a	"Wet Feet"	Erik Knutson	Erik Knutson	Chris Rutkowski	February 8, 2018	N/A
Bugs teaches Bigfoot how to swim.
48b	48b	"There's a Soccer Born Every Minute"	Scott Bern	Kevin Fleming and Rob Janas	Erik Knutson	February 8, 2018	N/A
Bugs winds up in the middle of a soccer game and joins the losing team to lead them to victory.
49a	49a	"Pork Lift"	Sean Petrilak	Matt Craig, Kevin Fleming, and Rob Janas	Mike Ruocco	February 8, 2018	N/A
Bugs decides to move away from his forest home and hires Porky to help.
49b	49b	"Thes in the City"	Scott Bern	Matt Craig, Kevin Fleming, and Rob Janas	Celia Kendrick	February 8, 2018	N/A
Bugs takes a trip to New York City, where he tries to get rid of King Thes, who wants to stay in Bugs' penthouse suite.
50a	50a	"Elmer's Fuddge"	Sean Petrilak	Matt Craig	Sahin Ersöz	February 8, 2018	N/A
Elmer hires Bugs to act as a mascot to drum up his failing ice cream business so he can compete against Foghorn Leghorn.
50b	50b	"Angelo the Mighty Flea"	Sean Petrilak	Matt Craig, Kevin Fleming, and Rob Janas	David "Pez" Hofmann	February 8, 2018	N/A
Squeaks befriends Mighty Angelo the Flea, who uses his super strength to torment Bugs.
51a	51a	"Gorky Pork"	Erik Knutson	Matt Craig, Kevin Fleming, and Rob Janas	Chris Rutkowski	February 8, 2018	N/A
Officer Porky is on the case when someone steals Bugs' tablet.
51b	51b	"Hard Hat Hare"	Sean Petrilak	Matt Craig, Kevin Fleming, and Rob Janas	Dan Fausett	February 8, 2018	N/A
Bugs tries to cause an accident on Sam's construction site when he starts building a highway on top of his hole.
52a	52a	"Porky's Duck-livery Service"	Scott Bern	Matt Craig, Kevin Fleming, and Rob Janas	Mike Ruocco	February 8, 2018	N/A
Porky is assigned to deliver a duck to a duck pond in time for the grand opening, which is made difficult when the duck (which turns out to be Daffy Duck) escapes from his box and leads Porky on a wild chase through the town.
52b	52b	"The Wabbit Who Would Be King"	Erik Knutson	Matt Craig, Kevin Fleming, and Rob Janas	Joseph Adams	February 8, 2018	N/A
Leslie P. Lilylegs schemes to kill Bugs when the king retires and appoints the rabbit as ruler instead of him.

=== Season 2 (2018–19) ===
The first 13 episodes were released in the United States on June 25, 2018 (with the exception of episodes 5 and 13, which were released earlier). Season 2 premiered in the United Kingdom and Ireland on September 4, 2017.

Note: All release dates listed are for Boomerang's streaming service unless otherwise noted.

No. overall	No. in season	Title	Directed by	Written by	Storyboarded by	Original release date	US viewers (millions)
53a	1a	"Pigmallian"	Erik Knutson	Kevin Fleming and Rob Janas	Mike Ruocco	June 25, 2018	TBD
Security guard Porky chases Daffy as he wreaks havoc throughout the mall. Note: The English version of this episode first aired in Britain and Ireland on September 4, 2017.
53b	1b	"Bugs the Gladiator"	Erik Knutson	Kevin Fleming and Rob Janas	Rich Arons	June 25, 2018	TBD
Bugs finds himself in the Roman Colosseum where he faces off against Cal the Gladiator. Note: The English version of this episode first aired in Britain and Ireland on September 4, 2017.
54a	2a	"A Duck in the Penthouse"	Erik Knutson	Story by : Rebecca Sage Allen; Teleplay by : Matt Craig	Alec Megibben	June 25, 2018	TBD
Doorman Porky must evacuate Daffy from the penthouse before an important tenant arrives who turns out to be Daffy. Note: The English version of this episode first aired in the United Kingdom on September 4, 2017.
54b	2b	"Tour De Bugs"	Erik Knutson	Kevin Fleming and Rob Janas	David "Pez" Hofmann	June 25, 2018	TBD
Bugs, Squeaks, and Cecil Turtle participate in a bicycle race. Note: The English version of this episode first aired in the United Kingdom on September 4, 2017.
55a	3a	"Knight and Duck"	Sean Petrilak	Story by : Amanda Blake Davis and Brendan O. Kelly; Teleplay by : Matt Craig	Joey Adams	June 25, 2018	TBD
Sir Littlechin challenges new court jester Daffy to a duel after being insulted by his comedy routine. Note: The English version of this episode first aired in the United Kingdom on September 5, 2017.
55b	3b	"The Color of Bunny"	Sean Petrilak	Kevin Fleming and Rob Janas	Erin Kavanagh	June 25, 2018	TBD
Bugs tries to win back Squeaks' nuts in a series of billiards challenges against pool shark Shifty. Note: The English version of this episode first aired in the United Kingdom on September 5, 2017.
56a	4a	"Sam and the Bullet Train"	Sean Petrilak	Kevin Fleming and Rob Janas	Robb Pratt	June 25, 2018	TBD
Sam attempts to rob the world's fastest train. Note: The English version of this episode first aired in the United Kingdom on September 5, 2017.
56b	4b	"Swine Dining"	Sean Petrilak	Story by : Joe Canale and Molly Erdman; Teleplay by : Matt Craig	Karl Hadrika	June 25, 2018	TBD
Daffy learns that he's the main course at Porky's fancy restaurant. Note: The English version of this episode first aired in the United Kingdom on September 5, 2017.
57a	5a	"Love Is in the Hare"	Ian Wasseluk	Kevin Fleming and Rob Janas	Mike Ruocco	February 8, 2018	TBD
Bugs shapes Sam into the perfect man for a lovelorn Ellie Mae. Note: The English version of this episode first aired in Britain and Ireland on September 6, 2017.
57b	5b	"Valentine's Dayffy"	Ian Wasseluk	Kevin Fleming and Rob Janas	Rich Arons	February 8, 2018	TBD
On Valentine's Day, Daffy tries to win over the girl of his dreams with some help from Cupid's magic arrows. Note: The English version of this episode first aired in Britain and Ireland on September 6, 2017.
58a	6a	"Bigs Bunny"	Ian Wasseluk	Story by : Rebecca Sage Allen; Teleplay by : Matt Craig	Alec Megibben	June 25, 2018	TBD
A hungry Bugs trades Squeaks to the Barbarian for a giant carrot. Note: This episode was first aired in Britain and Ireland on September 7, 2017.
58b	6b	"Wahder, Wahder, Everywhere"	Ian Wasseluk	Story by : Bob Dassie; Teleplay by : Matt Craig	David "Pez" Hofmann	June 25, 2018	TBD
Daffy interferes when Elmer starts draining the lake for his mineral water business. Note: This episode was first aired in Britain and Ireland on September 7, 2017.
59a	7a	"Porky the Disorderly"	Erik Knutson	Kevin Fleming and Rob Janas	Joey Adams	June 25, 2018	TBD
Porky must escort a very disruptive Daffy off the hospital premises. Note: This episode was first aired in Britain and Ireland on September 8, 2017.
59b	7b	"Game, Set, Wabbit"	Erik Knutson	Story by : Joe Canale and Molly Erdman; Teleplay by : Matt Craig	Erin Kavanagh	June 25, 2018	TBD
Bugs and Viktor compete in a tennis match for the Simbledon Cup. Note: This episode was first aired in Britain and Ireland on September 8, 2017.
60a	8a	"Lucky Duck"	Erik Knutson	Story by : Katie Nahnsen; Teleplay by : Matt Craig	Andrew Dickman	June 25, 2018	TBD
Down on his luck again, Shameless O'Scanty finds a new lucky charm in the form of Daffy. Note: This episode was first aired in Britain and Ireland on September 11, 2017.
60b	8b	"Free Range Foghorn"	Erik Knutson	Kevin Fleming and Rob Janas	Karl Hadrika	June 25, 2018	TBD
Daffy pretends to be a chicken for a free stay on Foghorn Leghorn's farm. Note: This episode was first aired in Britain and Ireland on September 11, 2017.
61a	9a	"Love It or Survivalist It"	Sean Petrilak	Kevin Fleming and Rob Janas	Mike Ruocco	June 25, 2018	TBD
Survivalist Tad Tucker returns looking to renovate a dilapidated forest home. Note: This episode was first aired in Britain and Ireland on September 12, 2017.
61b	9b	"The Porklight"	Sean Petrilak	Story by : Amanda Blake Davis and Brendan O. Kelly; Teleplay by : Matt Craig	Rich Arons	June 25, 2018	TBD
Daffy disrupts a screening of Hamlet at Porky's movie theater. Note: This episode was first aired in Britain and Ireland on September 12, 2017.
62a	10a	"Best Bugs"	Sean Petrilak	Kevin Fleming and Rob Janas	Alec Megibben	June 25, 2018	TBD
Spoiled rich kid Paul Perdy forces Bugs to be his best friend for the afternoon. Note: This episode was first aired in Britain and Ireland on September 13, 2017.
62b	10b	"Lewis and Pork"	Sean Petrilak	Kevin Fleming and Rob Janas	David "Pez" Hofmann	June 25, 2018	TBD
In 1805, President Elmer Fudd tasks explorers Porky and Daffy with finding the Northwest Passage. Note: This episode was first aired in Britain and Ireland on September 13, 2017.
63a	11a	"Daffy the Stowaway"	Ian Wasseluk	Kevin Fleming and Rob Janas	Joey Adams	June 25, 2018	TBD
Daffy stows away on a cruise ship and Porky must make sure his boss doesn't find out. Note: This episode was first aired in Britain and Ireland on September 14, 2017.
63b	11b	"Superscooter 3000"	Ian Wasseluk	Kevin Fleming and Rob Janas	Erin Kavanagh	June 25, 2018	TBD
In the Italian countryside, Bugs and Squeaks become the target of Claudette and the Hazmats when they take a ride on a scooter carrying a top secret flash drive. Note: This episode was first aired in Britain and Ireland on September 14, 2017.
64a	12a	"Hoggin' the Road"	Ian Wasseluk	Story by : Kevin Kramer; Teleplay by : Matt Craig	Andrew Dickman	June 25, 2018	TBD
Porky's peaceful road trip hits a snag when he decides to bring a supposedly injured Daffy along for the ride. Note: This episode was first aired in Britain and Ireland on September 15, 2017.
64b	12b	"Timmmmmmbugs"	Ian Wasseluk	Story by : Frank Caeti; Teleplay by : Matt Craig	Karl Hadrika	June 25, 2018	TBD
Bugs participates in a series of lumberjack challenges to stop Blacque Jacque Shellacque from chopping down all the trees in the forest. Note: This episode was first aired in Britain and Ireland on September 15, 2017.
65a	13a	"Easter Bunny Imposter"	Erik Knutson	Story by : Frank Caeti; Teleplay by : Kevin Fleming and Rob Janas	Mike Ruocco	March 15, 2018	TBD
A group of scouts are tracking the Easter Bunny, so he enlists Bugs' help in distracting them so he can finish his route. Note: This episode was first aired in Britain and Ireland on September 18, 2017.
65b	13b	"Easter Tweets"	Erik Knutson	Story by : Amanda Blake Davis and Brendan O. Kelly; Teleplay by : Matt Craig	Rich Arons	March 15, 2018	TBD
Granny hires Sylvester, who is disguised as the Easter Bunny, to babysit Tweety on Easter Sunday. Note: This episode was first aired in Britain and Ireland on September 18, 2017.
66a	14a	"Hoarder Up"	Erik Knutson	Story by : Kevin Kramer; Teleplay by : Matt Craig	Alec Megibben	November 28, 2018	TBD
Porky hires Daffy to install a hot tub in his home.
66b	14b	"Cougar, Cougar"	Erik Knutson	Kevin Fleming and Rob Janas	David "Pez" Hofmann	November 28, 2018	TBD
Squeaks tries to save Bugs from the clutches of the hungry Miss Cougar.
67a	15a	"The Wedding Quacksher"	Sean Petrilak	Story by : Joe Canale and Molly Erdman; Teleplay by : Matt Craig	Joey Adams	November 28, 2018	TBD
Leslie P. Lilylegs tries to stop Daffy from ruining his boss's daughter's wedding reception.
67b	15b	"The Food Notwork"	Sean Petrilak	Story by : Amanda Blake Davis and Brendan O. Kelly; Teleplay by : Matt Craig	Aaron Chen and Erin Kavanagh	November 28, 2018	TBD
Bugs sabotages Ivana's cooking show after she steals carrots from his garden.
68a	16a	"A Duck in the Aquarium"	Sean Petrilak	Kevin Fleming and Rob Janas	Andrew Dickman	November 28, 2018	TBD
Porky agrees to feed Daffy all the fish he can eat if he helps to improve the aquarium.
68b	16b	"The Breezehammer"	Sean Petrilak	Story by : Rebecca Sage Allen; Teleplay by : Matt Craig	Karl Hadrika	November 28, 2018	TBD
Bugs' attempts to master a complicated kite maneuver are thwarted when Boyd falls in love with his kite.
69a	17a	"Quantum Sheep"	Ian Wasseluk	Kevin Fleming and Rob Janas	Rich Arons	November 28, 2018	TBD
Dr. Clovenhoof creates an age machine that transports himself, Bugs and Squeaks to different stages of their lives.
69b	17b	"Houston, We Have a Duck Problem"	Ian Wasseluk	Kevin Fleming and Rob Janas	Mike Ruocco	November 28, 2018	TBD
Daffy hitches a ride on what he believes is plane bound for Hawaii but is actually a rocket, manned by Porky, on a mission to Mars.
70a	18a	"10-4, Good Bunny"	Ian Wasseluk	Kevin Fleming and Rob Janas	Alec Megibben	November 28, 2018	TBD
Bugs and Squeaks rent an eighteen-wheeler to deliver a piano to Bugs' nephew Clyde, only to be pursued by traffic cop Sam.
70b	18b	"Gold Medal Wabbit"	Ian Wasseluk	Story by : Joe Canale and Molly Erdman; Teleplay by : Matt Craig	Robb Pratt and Lenord Robinson	November 28, 2018	TBD
Bugs competes against Cal in the Whole Buncha Countries Games.
71a	19a	"Cyrano de Bugs"	Erik Knutson	Kevin Fleming and Rob Janas	Joey Adams	November 28, 2018	TBD
Bugs gives romantic advice to Leslie P. Lilylegs who is trying to win the heart of a rich heiress.
71b	19b	"Point Duck Percent"	Erik Knutson	Kevin Fleming and Rob Janas	Erin Kavanagh	November 28, 2018	TBD
Groundskeeper Porky must keep the Perdy's mansion grounds safe from Daffy in hopes of winning a beautification award.
72a	20a	"Sir Littlechin and the Kraken"	Erik Knutson	Matt Craig	Andrew Dickman	November 28, 2018	TBD
While deep sea diving, Bugs and Squeaks befriend a kraken which becomes the target of Sir Littlechin.
72b	20b	"Crouching Porky, Hidden Daffy"	Erik Knutson	Kevin Fleming and Rob Janas	Karl Hadrika	November 28, 2018	TBD
Ninja Daffy attempts to steal a sacred artifact being delivered by Shaolin monk Porky.
73a	21a	"King Nutininkommen"	Sean Petrilak	Story by : Bob Dassie; Teleplay by : Matt Craig	David "Pez" Hofmann	November 28, 2018	TBD
Archaeologists Porky and Daffy discover the lost Tomb of King Nutininkommen and encounter a vengeful mummy.
73b	21b	"Greenhouse Gasbag"	Sean Petrilak	Story by : Martin Garcia; Teleplay by : Matt Craig	Rich Arons	November 28, 2018	TBD
Activist Trey Hugger gets more than he bargained for when he asks Foghorn Leghorn to talk about the environment.
74a	22a	"Abracawabbit"	Sean Petrilak	Story by : Rebecca Sage Allen; Teleplay by : Matt Craig	Alec Megibben	November 28, 2018	TBD
In order to save another rabbit from being cut in half, Bugs volunteers to assist Viktor with his magic show.
74b	22b	"Ponce de Calzone"	Sean Petrilak	Story by : Katie Nahnsen; Teleplay by : Matt Craig	Mike Ruocco	November 28, 2018	TBD
Daffy agrees to help explorer Ponce de Calzone discover the Fountain of Youth.
75a	23a	"For the Love of Fraud"	Ian Wasseluk	Story by : Frank Caeti; Teleplay by : Matt Craig	Joey Adams and Aaron Chen	November 28, 2018	TBD
Bugs intervenes when Squeaks loses his life savings to Foghorn Leghorn's snake oil scam.
75b	23b	"Not So Special Delivery"	Ian Wasseluk	Story by : Kevin Kramer; Teleplay by : Matt Craig	Lenord Robinson	November 28, 2018	TBD
Parenting styles clash when baby deliverymen Porky and Daffy are forced to babysit one of their deliveries.
76a	24a	"One Carroter in Search of an Artist"	Ian Wasseluk	Matt Craig	Andrew Dickman	November 28, 2018	TBD
In a tribute to "Duck Amuck" and "Rabbit Rampage", Bugs clashes with an off-screen computer animator, later revealed to be Daffy.
76b	24b	"The Duck Days of Summer"	Ian Wasseluk	Story by : Rebecca Sage Allen; Teleplay by : Matt Craig	Karl Hadrika	November 28, 2018	TBD
Mayor Elmer Fudd turns Daffy into a local celebrity who soon comes to regret his newfound fame.
77a	25a	"Etiquette Shmetiquette"	Erik Knutson	Kevin Fleming and Rob Janas	David "Pez" Hofmann	November 28, 2018	TBD
Daffy infiltrates Granny and Tweety's new charm school for chickens in search of a meal.
77b	25b	"Daffy in the Science Museum"	Erik Knutson	Kevin Fleming and Rob Janas	Rich Arons	November 28, 2018	TBD
Daffy attempts to liven up a visit to the science museum for a group of scouts, angering tour guide Porky.
78a	26a	"Tad the Bachelor"	Erik Knutson	Kevin Fleming and Rob Janas	Alec Megibben	January 31, 2019	TBD
Bugs disrupts Tad Tucker's latest romantic reality TV show.
78b	26b	"Affaire du Jour"	Erik Knutson	Matt Craig	Mike Ruocco	January 31, 2019	TBD
Double agent Pepé Le Pew fights the Hazmats and tries to woo Claudette at a French bistro. Note: This episode has no dialogue and the sound effects were mostly muted.
79a	27a	"Top Bugs"	Sean Petrilak	Kevin Fleming and Rob Janas	Joey Adams	November 28, 2018	TBD
In flight school, Cecil becomes Bugs' wingman and the two must learn to work together.
79b	27b	"Slugsmoby"	Sean Petrilak	Kevin Fleming and Rob Janas	Greg Leysens, Nick Leysens, and Lenord Robinson	November 28, 2018	TBD
Blacque Jacque Shellacque kidnaps Bugs and forces him to join his crew as he searches the seas for an elusive whale.
80a	28a	"Rhoda Rage"	Sean Petrilak	Story by : Sean Petrilak; Teleplay by : Matt Craig	Andrew Dickman	November 28, 2018	TBD
Wrestler Rhoda Roundhouse challenges Bugs to a match after he accuses her of cheating.
80b	28b	"Good Duck to You, Cirque"	Sean Petrilak	Story by : Katie Nahnsen; Teleplay by : Matt Craig	Aaron Chen	November 28, 2018	TBD
Daffy heckles Viktor's pretentious circus act and tries to liven things up with some classic circus antics.
81a	29a	"Then Things Got Weird"	Ian Wasseluk	Kevin Fleming and Rob Janas	David "Pez" Hofmann	September 26, 2018	TBD
Bugs tells a couple of lost kids the story of when he was framed by a mysterious imposter.
81b	29b	"Duck Duck Ghost"	Ian Wasseluk	Story by : Bob Dassie; Teleplay by : Matt Craig	Rich Arons	September 26, 2018	TBD
Porky chases Daffy into a haunted house after he pilfers his bowl of Halloween candy.
82a	30a	"Acme Instant"	Ian Wasseluk	Kevin Fleming and Rob Janas	Alec Megibben	November 28, 2018	TBD
Wile E. believes catching the Roadrunner will be easy when he learns he has gotten a job as an Acme deliveryman.
82b	30b	"When Marvin Comes Martian In"	Ian Wasseluk	Story by : Ian Wasseluk; Teleplay by : Matt Craig	Mike Ruocco	November 28, 2018	TBD
Marvin the Martian abducts Daffy to learn more about earthlings and their weaknesses.
83a	31a	"The Knight Time Is the Right Time"	Erik Knutson	Kevin Fleming and Rob Janas	Joey Adams	November 28, 2018	TBD
Leslie P. Lilylegs tries to get Bugs to relinquish his position of Knight of the Square Table so that he can take his place.
83b	31b	"The Pepé Le Pew Affair"	Erik Knutson	Kevin Fleming and Rob Janas	Aaron Chen	November 28, 2018	TBD
Claudette infiltrates a museum to steal the crown jewels, only to find Pepé standing in her way.
84a	32a	"Hamsters"	Erik Knutson	Kevin Fleming and Rob Janas	Andrew Dickman	November 28, 2018	TBD
Bugs finds his home overrun with hamsters that he agrees to pet sit for Porky.
84b	32b	"Bugs Baked"	Erik Knutson	Story by : Erik Knutson; Teleplay by : Matt Craig	Shellie O'Brien	November 28, 2018	TBD
Bugs and Cecil race to a party after they learn they're both bringing the same dish.
85a	33a	"Vampire Me Love"	Sean Petrilak	Story by : David Shair; Teleplay by : Matt Craig	David "Pez" Hofmann	November 28, 2018	TBD
Daffy Van Duckling hunts the vampire responsible for robbing Porky's blood bank.
85b	33b	"The Tad Tucker Workout"	Sean Petrilak	Kevin Fleming and Rob Janas	Rich Arons	November 28, 2018	TBD
Bugs sabotages Tad Tucker's newest venture, a five-and-a-half minute workout tape.
86a	34a	"Canadian Bacon"	Sean Petrilak	Kevin Fleming and Rob Janas	Alec Megibben	November 28, 2018	TBD
Mountie Porky is tasked with evacuating a mountain town threatened by an avalanche, but has a hard time making Daffy leave.
86b	34b	"Bugs Bunny Saves the Universe"	Sean Petrilak	Kevin Fleming and Rob Janas	Mike Ruocco	November 28, 2018	TBD
Parodying Star Wars, in a galaxy far, far away, Bugs Sandraker helps a team of rebels destroy a super weapon capable of blowing up planets.
87	35	"Hip Hop Hare"	Erik Knutson	Rebecca Sage Allen and Joshua Funk	Aaron Chen (Episode 1); Joey Adams (Episode 2)	November 28, 2018	TBD
In a special musical episode, Bugs seeks help after he and his friends are skunked by Eagle Scout in a rap battle, and challenges him to a rap battle rematch after a lesson in rap from Snoop Dogg. Special Guest: Snoop Dogg as himself
88a	36a	"Gettin' Your Goat"	Ian Wasseluk	Story by : Andrew Dickman; Teleplay by : Matt Craig	Andrew Dickman	November 28, 2018	TBD
High-strung Gabby Goat seeks rest and relaxation at Porky's day spa.
88b	36b	"Spelunkheads"	Ian Wasseluk	Kevin Fleming and Rob Janas	Shellie O'Brien	November 28, 2018	TBD
Porky and Daffy explore a cave in South America in search of a rare blue orchid.
89a	37a	"Loon-Raker"	Ian Wasseluk	Kevin Fleming and Rob Janas	David "Pez" Hofmann	November 28, 2018	TBD
Agents Claudette Dupri and Pepé are sent to infiltrate super villain BloFudd's Moon base to stop his plan to freeze the Earth.
89b	37b	"Angry Bird"	Ian Wasseluk	Story by : Amanda Blake Davis and Brendan O. Kelly; Teleplay by : Matt Craig	Rich Arons	November 28, 2018	TBD
The tables are turned for Sylvester when Tweety is zapped by Wile E.'s newest invention, the Giganto Ray.
90a	38a	"Area Fifty-Run"	Erik Knutson	Story by : Aaron Chen and David Shair; Teleplay by : Matt Craig	Alec Megibben	November 28, 2018	TBD
Bugs accidentally burrows into Area 51, where he befriends a homesick baby martian and helps him escape from the clutches of five-star general Sam.
90b	38b	"Porker in the Court"	Erik Knutson	Story by : Michael Ruocco; Teleplay by : Kevin Fleming and Rob Janas	Michael Ruocco	November 28, 2018	TBD
Daffy is assigned to act as Porky's lawyer when he finds himself in court.
91a	39a	"Tad the Skydiver"	Sean Petrilak	Kevin Fleming and Rob Janas	Joey Adams	November 28, 2018	TBD
Bugs interferes when Tad Tucker tries to promote his new skydiving simulator on a morning talk show.
91b	39b	"Duck of the Flies"	Sean Petrilak	Story by : Martin Garcia; Teleplay by : Matt Craig	Aaron Chen	November 28, 2018	TBD
Daffy causes Porky's plane to crash, leaving the two stranded on a deserted island.
92a	40a	"Daffy in the Bayou"	Sean Petrilak	Story by : Bob Dassie; Teleplay by : Matt Craig	Andrew Dickman	January 31, 2019	TBD
Elmer hunts Daffy in the bayou, believing he will be the perfect ingredient for his gumbo.
92b	40b	"Bugs the Sherpa"	Sean Petrilak	Story by : Joe Canale and Molly Erdman; Teleplay by : Matt Craig	Shellie O'Brien	January 31, 2019	TBD
Rhoda Roundhouse enlists Bugs to be her guide when she decides to be the first person to climb Mount Killingmesoftly.
93a	41a	"You Can't Train a Pig"	Ian Wasseluk	Story by : David "Pez" Hofmann; Teleplay by : Matt Craig	David "Pez" Hofmann	January 31, 2019	TBD
Porky's quiet train ride is interrupted when he meets blabbermouth Petunia Pig.
93b	41b	"Copy Quack"	Ian Wasseluk	Kevin Fleming and Rob Janas	Rich Arons	January 31, 2019	TBD
Daffy runs amok in Porky's copy shop.
94a	42a	"Sir Littlechin and the Phoenix"	Ian Wasseluk	Story by : Frank Caeti; Teleplay by : Matt Craig	Alec Megibben	January 31, 2019	TBD
Sir Littlechin mistakes Daffy for the mythical phoenix that will help him regain his youth.
94b	42b	"Looney Luau"	Ian Wasseluk	Story by : Katie Nahnsen; Teleplay by : Matt Craig	Michael Ruocco	January 31, 2019	TBD
Daffy lands on a tropical island where King Thes and Miss Cougar want to sacrifice him to a volcano god.
95a	43a	"Amaduckus"	Erik Knutson	Kevin Fleming and Rob Janas	Joey Adams	January 31, 2019	TBD
Leslie P. Lilylegs tries to sabotage Daffy when the king makes him the new royal court composer and tasks him with writing a royal opera.
95b	43b	"Fowl Me Once"	Erik Knutson	Kevin Fleming and Rob Janas	Andrew Dickman	January 31, 2019	TBD
Foghorn Leghorn tries to protect his chicken farm from the Tasmanian Devil.
96a	44a	"Daffy the Gaucho"	Erik Knutson	Kevin Fleming and Rob Janas	Aaron Chen	January 31, 2019	TBD
Daffy tries to prove that he is a real gaucho after cattle rustlers make off with Don Fudderico's cows.
96b	44b	"Free Slugsworthy"	Erik Knutson	Kevin Fleming and Rob Janas	Shellie O'Brien	January 31, 2019	TBD
Bugs tries to free Slugsworthy the First after he becomes the latest attraction in Trey Hugger's aquarium.
97a	45a	"Love Makes Me Daffy"	Sean Petrilak	Story by : Katie Nahnsen; Teleplay by : Matt Craig	David "Pez" Hofmann	January 31, 2019	TBD
After having his eyes dilated at the optometrist, Daffy falls head over heels for a swan-shaped ice sculpture.
97b	45b	"Genghis Cal"	Sean Petrilak	Kevin Fleming and Rob Janas	Rich Arons	January 31, 2019	TBD
Bugs defends the Roman Empire from the invading Ghengis Cal.
98a	46a	"You're Kiln Me"	Sean Petrilak	Story by : Kevin Kramer; Teleplay by : Matt Craig	Alec Megibben	January 31, 2019	TBD
Sylvester chases Tweety through Trey Hugger's pottery store.
98b	46b	"Better Lake Than Never"	Sean Petrilak	Story by : Rebecca Sage Allen; Teleplay by : Matt Craig	Michael Ruocco	January 31, 2019	TBD
Elmer retreats to a quiet lake house to work on his novel, only to meet Daffy, who has rented the house next door for Spring Break.
99a	47a	"Deduce, Part Deuce"	Ian Wasseluk	Story by : Bob Dassie; Teleplay by : Matt Craig	Joey Adams	January 31, 2019	TBD
In a follow-up to "Deduce, You Say!," Granny hires Dorlock Homes to solve the case of the missing Tweety.
99b	47b	"#1 Grandpa"	Ian Wasseluk	Kevin Fleming and Rob Janas	Andrew Dickman	January 31, 2019	TBD
Bugs helps Leslie P. Lilylegs prove to Paul and Pampreen Perdy that he is their favorite Grandpa so that they will invite him on a fancy cruise.
100	48	"Porky and Thes"	Ian Wasseluk	Rebecca Sage Allen and Josh Funk	Aaron Chen (Episode 1); Shellie O'Brien (Episode 2)	January 31, 2019	TBD
Elmer tells the musical tale of Porky and King Thes, who both fall in love with the beautiful Petunia Pig, who agrees to go on individual dates with them to decide which one will court her.
101a	49a	"Men in Quack"	Erik Knutson	Kevin Fleming and Rob Janas	David "Pez" Hofmann	January 31, 2019	TBD
Porky seeks the help of alien investigator Daffy when he believes his new neighbor Marvin is plotting the destruction of Earth.
101b	49b	"Littlechin and the Wood Fairy"	Erik Knutson	Kevin Fleming and Rob Janas	Rich Arons	January 31, 2019	TBD
Bugs tricks Sir Littlechin into believing the Tasmanian Devil is an elusive wood fairy.
102	50	"Tweet Team"	Erik Knutson	Matt Craig	Alec Megibben (Episode 1); Mike Ruocco (Episode 2)	January 31, 2019	TBD
Speedy Gonzales enlists the help of Tweety, Gabby Goat, and Marc Antony when his friends are captured by Sylvester, Claude and Pete Puma and the newly formed quatrio must outwit them to save Hubie, Bertie and Minnesota Rats from becoming dinner.
103a	51a	"Downton Wabby"	Sean Petrilak	Kevin Fleming and Rob Janas	Joey Adams	January 31, 2019	TBD
Butler Leslie P. Lilylegs learns his sick and elderly master plans to leave his entire estate to Bugs instead of him.
103b	51b	"Fowl Me Twice"	Sean Petrilak	Kevin Fleming and Rob Janas	Andrew Dickman	January 31, 2019	TBD
Foghorn Leghorn decides to discipline the Tasmanian Devil with karate lessons when he returns to his chicken farm.
104	52	"Hare to the Throne"	Sean Petrilak	Matt Craig	Shellie O'Brien (Episode 1); Aaron Chen (Episode 2)	January 31, 2019	TBD
Sam usurps the throne from King Bugs and banishes him from the kingdom, leading peasants Porky and Daffy on a quest to find him, and the three of them return to storm the castle so Bugs can retake his rightful place as ruler.

=== Season 3 (2019–20) ===
No. overall	No. in season	Title	Directed by	Written by	Storyboarded by	Original release date	US viewers (millions)
105a	1a	"Sir Littlechin and the Giant"	Ian Wasseluk	Matt Craig	Rich Arons	August 29, 2019	TBD
Sir Littlechin is trying to find, and capture, the rarely seen Giant. It is up to Bugs and Squeaks to protect the Giant from the nefarious Littlechin.
105b	1b	"The Wrong Brothers"	Ian Wasseluk	Kevin Fleming and Rob Janas	Dave Kupczyk	August 29, 2019	TBD
Daffy is determined to be the first creature to fly an airplane and his intrepid assistant Porky is forced to help him, while the dimwitted Wright Brothers make comments at every trial run and failure.
106a	2a	"Weiner Lose"	Erik Knutson	Matt Craig	Alec Megibben	August 29, 2019	TBD
When Squeaks accidentally ties his hot dog to his balloon, Bugs is left to fetch it. Note: This episode has no dialogue or sound effects, similar to "Snow Wabbit" and "Thirst Things Thirst".
106b	2b	"Yankee Doodle Bunny"	Erik Knutson	Kevin Fleming & Rob Janas	Joey Adams	August 29, 2019	TBD
When Bugs gets overtaxed on his carrot-infused tea by Elmer, he heads to Elmer's ship to start the American Revolution.
107a	3a	"The Meanie and the Genie"	Sean Petrilak	Story by : Matt Craig; Teleplay by : Kevin Fleming and Rob Janas	Mike Ruocco	August 29, 2019	TBD
When Bugs finds the magical Genie of the Lamp, he and Sam end up fighting for control of the Genie's power.
107b	3b	"In Cold Fudd"	Sean Petrilak	Kevin Fleming and Rob Janas	Shellie O'Brien	August 29, 2019	TBD
When Elmer comes to town for a hunting trip, Bugs teaches him a lesson.
108a	4a	"North Pole Position"	Ian Wasseluk	Kevin Fleming and Rob Janas	Aaron Chen	August 29, 2019	TBD
Daffy and Porky have misadventures in the North Pole.
108b	4b	"Papa's Got a Brand New Sam"	Ian Wasseluk	Story by : Matt Craig; Teleplay by : Kevin Fleming and Rob Janas	Andrew Dickman	August 29, 2019	TBD
Sam insists he has turned over a new leaf, but he is just pretending to be nice in order to swindle the animals out of their land.
109a	5a	"Lifestyles of the Wealthy and Obnoxious"	Erik Knutson	Kevin Fleming and Rob Janas	Rich Arons	August 29, 2019	TBD
When Bugs finds out that Tad is going to cook a bunch of rabbits, he ruins Tad's TV show and his mansion.
109b	5b	"The Starship Mentalprise"	Erik Knutson	Kevin Fleming and Rob Janas	Dave Kupczyk	August 29, 2019	TBD
At a Sci-Fi convention, Daffy mistakes Marvin the Martian's flying saucer for one of the convention's exhibitions.
110a	6a	"State Fair and Balanced"	Sean Petrilak	Kevin Fleming and Rob Janas	Alec Megibben	August 29, 2019	TBD
Sam challenges Bugs to series of State Fair-centric contests. Whoever wins the most events is the king of the State Fair.
110b	6b	"Pussyfoot Soldier"	Sean Petrilak	Matt Craig	Joey Adams	August 29, 2019	TBD
Army Guard Dog Marc Antony goes gaga for the little kitten Pussyfoot. His sergeant does not approve.
111a	7a	"Quack to the Future"	Ian Wasseluk	Kevin Fleming and Rob Janas	Mike Ruocco	August 29, 2019	TBD
Daffy saves Earth and frees everyone from the control of the robots.
111b	7b	"OctoPepe"	Ian Wasseluk	Story by : Matt Craig; Teleplay by : Kevin Fleming and Rob Janas	Aaron Chen, Andrew Dickman, Shellie O'Brien, Mike Ruocco, and David Shair	August 29, 2019	TBD
Claudette and Pepé compete to see who can stop Elmer Blofudd.
112a	8a	"No Thanks Giving"	Erik Knutson	Kevin Fleming and Rob Janas	Aaron Chen	August 29, 2019	TBD
Elmer and the Pilgrims land at Plymouth Rock and decide to celebrate by having a Thanksgiving feast with Bugs as the main course.
112b	8b	"DarkBat"	Erik Knutson	Matt Craig	Andrew Dickman	August 29, 2019	TBD
DarkBat, a.k.a. Sniffles, helps a gang of mice who have been forced out of their homes by Sylvester, Claude and Pete Puma.
113a	9a	"Yosemite Samson"	Sean Petrilak	Kevin Fleming and Rob Janas	Rich Arons	August 29, 2019	TBD
Bugs must take on Yosemite Samson after he has destroyed his house.
113b	9b	"Puppy's Got Claws"	Sean Petrilak	Story by : Matt Craig; Teleplay by : Kevin Fleming and Rob Janas	Dave Kupczyk	August 29, 2019	TBD
Sylvester, Claude, and Pete Puma attempt to steal food from Granny's house. Her pet dog Frisky Puppy spoils their plans.
114a	10a	"Driving Miss Daffy"	Ian Wasseluk	Kevin Fleming and Rob Janas	Alec Megibben	August 29, 2019	TBD
Daffy takes a driving test from Elmer in order to get his driving license.
114b	10b	"Second Fiddle"	Ian Wasseluk	Story by : Matt Craig; Teleplay by : Kevin Fleming and Rob Janas	Joey Adams	August 29, 2019	TBD
Leslie wants to be the 2nd chair violinist in the symphony, but he has to beat out Bugs for the spot, so he resorts to cheating. Leslie still loses.
115a	11a	"Point Beak"	Erik Knutson	Kevin Fleming and Rob Janas	Mike Ruocco	August 29, 2019	TBD
A take on the film Point Break, Elliot assigns police officers Porky and Horace to go undercover as surfers to catch extreme surfer Daffy.
115b	11b	"Cal the Viking"	Erik Knutson	Matt Craig, Kevin Fleming, and Rob Janas	Ernie Keen	August 29, 2019	TBD
Cal the Viking attempts to conquer Bugs' home.
116a	12a	"Rhoda's Road House"	Sean Petrilak	Kevin Fleming and Rob Janas	Aaron Chen	August 29, 2019	TBD
Bugs and Squeaks go to Rhoda Roundhouse's Roadside Road House Restaurant, but are kicked out because the restaurant is "for bikers only."
116b	12b	"Claire de Loon"	Sean Petrilak	Matt Craig	Andrew Dickman	August 29, 2019	TBD
Phoebe and Justin are forced to go to sleep by their mom, but their dreams are full of memories of their play date with Daffy.
117a	13a	"Daffy Duck: Motivational Guru"	Ian Wasseluk	Story by : Katie Nahnsen; Teleplay by : Kevin Fleming and Rob Janas	Rich Arons	August 29, 2019	TBD
Elmer takes a Tony Robbins-type self-confidence course from Daffy.
117b	13b	"The Towering Hamsterno"	Ian Wasseluk	Kevin Fleming and Rob Janas	Dave Kupczyk	August 29, 2019	TBD
When the evil hamsters take over a high rise, it is up to Pepé and Claudette to stop them. Special Guest: Mark Hamill as Hans Hamster
118a	14a	"Viktor the Science Swede"	Erik Knutson	Story by : Rebecca Sage Allen; Teleplay by : Matt Craig	Alec Megibben	August 29, 2019	TBD
TV scientist Viktor is filming his science show in the woods. When he uses Bugs as his guinea pig, Bugs turns the tables on Viktor.
118b	14b	"Dorlock and the Disorient Express"	Erik Knutson	Story by : Bob Dassie; Teleplay by : Matt Craig, Kevin Fleming, and Rob Janas	Joey Adams	August 29, 2019	TBD
In another sequel to Deduce, You Say!, Dorlock Homes and Dr. Watkins try to solve the mystery of the missing appetizers.
119a	15a	"Regatta de Rabbit"	Sean Petrilak	Story by : Frank Caeti; Teleplay by : Matt Craig	Mike Ruocco	August 29, 2019	TBD
Bugs and Cecil battle it out in a sailboat race.
119b	15b	"When Irish Eyes are Swinin'"	Sean Petrilak	Kevin Fleming and Rob Janas	Ernie Keen	August 29, 2019	TBD
Shameless O'Scanty tries to improve his luck by capturing Porky Pig.
120a	16a	"Bunny Man"	Ian Wasseluk	Kevin Fleming and Rob Janas	Aaron Chen	August 29, 2019	TBD
Trey Hugger's mission is to protect the safety and well-being of rabbits, but makes Bugs' life miserable by being overly protective.
120b	16b	"Quagmire of Solace"	Ian Wasseluk	Story by : Matt Craig; Teleplay by : Kevin Fleming and Rob Janas	Andrew Dickman	August 29, 2019	TBD
Elmer Blofudd sets a trap for Pepé and Claudette, forcing them to escape the swamps of Louisiana.
121a	17a	"Coyote Under Construction"	Erik Knutson	Matt Craig	Rich Arons, Erik Knutson, and Nick Leysens	August 29, 2019	TBD
Architect Wile E. drops everything to destroy the Road Runner.
121b	17b	"The Bunny and the Goon"	Erik Knutson	Kevin Fleming and Rob Janas	Dave Kupczyk	August 29, 2019	TBD
Bugs is watching a hockey game and calls out hockey goon Blacque Jacques Shellacque for his obvious cheating.
122a	18a	"Model T. Fudd"	Sean Petrilak	Kevin Fleming and Rob Janas	Alec Megibben	August 29, 2019	TBD
Bugs works on an assembly line in a car factory. Elmer tries to get rid of Bugs, but the wascawwy wabbit turns the tables on him.
122b	18b	"Victory Clasp"	Sean Petrilak	Matt Craig, Kevin Fleming, and Rob Janas	Joey Adams	August 29, 2019	TBD
Bugs and the rest of the gang teach Squeaks the Victory Clasp.
123a	19a	"Lola Rider"	Ian Wasseluk	Kevin Fleming and Rob Janas	Ernie Keen	August 29, 2019	TBD
When Rhoda Roundhouse tears up the forest with her muscle car, Lola Bunny teaches Rhoda some road rules.
123b	19b	"Daredevil Duck"	Ian Wasseluk	Kevin Fleming and Rob Janas	Ernie Keen	August 29, 2019	TBD
Daredevil Daffy attempts to jump his motorcycle over the fountain of the Briarwood Hotel. Note: Slugsworthy the First makes a cameo appearance in this episode.
124	20	"Planet of the Bigfoots"	Erik Knutson	Matt Craig, Kevin Fleming, and Rob Janas	Aaron Chen (Episode 1); Andrew Dickman (Episode 2)	August 29, 2019	TBD
Space adventurer Bugs and his crew of misfits travel to the Planet of the Bigfoots, where they team up with the adorable Little Bigfoots to battle the evil Calzonius and the Hazmats.
125a	21a	"Cold Medal Wabbit"	Sean Petrilak	Story by : Rebecca Sage Allen; Teleplay by : Matt Craig	Rich Arons	August 29, 2019	TBD
Cal attempts to win gold in every Winter Olympic event, but Bugs keeps him from accomplishing his goal.
125b	21b	"No Duck Is an Island"	Sean Petrilak	Story by : Bob Dassie; Teleplay by : Kevin Fleming and Rob Janas	Dave Kupczyk	August 29, 2019	TBD
Tad Tucker and Daffy compete against each other for the title of "Island Master".
126a	22a	"My Kingdom for a Duck"	Ian Wasseluk	Kevin Fleming and Rob Janas	Alec Megibben	August 29, 2019	TBD
When Elmer Fudderbatch is doing his one-man show of Shakespeare scenes, Daffy comes into his theater and disturbs his play. Note: Sam makes a silent cameo appearance in this episode.
126b	22b	"Finders Keepers, Losers Sweepers"	Ian Wasseluk	Story by : Matt Craig; Teleplay by : Kevin Fleming and Rob Janas	Joey Adams	August 29, 2019	TBD
Witch Hazel is upset when Bugs accidentally buys her enchanted broom from her yard sale.
127a	23a	"Daffy Crackpot"	Erik Knutson	Kevin Fleming and Rob Janas	Mike Ruocco	August 29, 2019	TBD
Famous frontiersman Daffy Crackpot tries to help settler Porky fight Renegade Sam and reclaim Porky's homestead, which Sam stole.
127b	23b	"Fashion Viktor"	Erik Knutson	Story by : Katie Nahnsen; Teleplay by : Matt Craig	Ernie Keen and Nick Leysens	August 29, 2019	TBD
Bugs seeks vengeance on Viktor the male model for using rabbit fur in his "Nature Fashion Show".
128a	24a	"Sam the Roughrider"	Sean Petrilak	Kevin Fleming and Rob Janas	Aaron Chen	August 29, 2019	TBD
Sam tries to seek glory in battle by taking over Bugs' hill.
128b	24b	"Fool's Gold"	Sean Petrilak	Kevin Fleming and Rob Janas	Andrew Dickman	August 29, 2019	TBD
Daffy decides to help out Red Omaha mine for gold. Note: Mac and Tosh made an appearance in this episode.
129a	25a	"Bonjour, DarkBat"	Ian Wasseluk	Kevin Fleming and Rob Janas	Rich Arons	August 29, 2019	TBD
When Blacque Jacque Shellacque destroys Minnesota Rats' cheese shop, Darkbat seeks vengeance.
129b	25b	"Renaissance Fair-Thee Well"	Ian Wasseluk	Matt Craig, Kevin Fleming, and Rob Janas	Dave Kupczyk	August 29, 2019	TBD
Police Officers Horace and Porky go undercover at a Renaissance Fair to bust Sir Littlechin, who they suspect has been stealing turkey legs.
130	26	"CinderPorker"	Erik Knutson	Matt Craig, Kevin Fleming, and Rob Janas	Alec Megibben (Episode 1); Joey Adams (Episode 2)	August 29, 2019	TBD
Porky falls in love with Petunia, queen of the land. His "fairy duckmother" Daffy gives him a makeover so he can go to the ball. Note: Red Omaha and Slugsworthy the First made a silent cameo appearance in this episode.
131a	27a	"You Ain't Nothin' But a Foghorn"	Sean Petrilak	Kevin Fleming and Rob Janas	Mike Ruocco	January 30, 2020	TBD
When shady concert promoter and rock star Foghorn Leghorn puts on a music festival, Daffy crashes the party and wreaks havoc.
131b	27b	"The Pepe Who Came in from the Cold"	Sean Petrilak	Story by : Matt Craig; Teleplay by : Kevin Fleming and Rob Janas	Ernie Keen	January 30, 2020	TBD
When Blacque Jacque Shellacque kidnaps Santa Claus, it is up to Pepé and Claudette to save the holiday season.
132a	28a	"Smoothie Operator"	Ian Wasseluk	Kevin Fleming and Rob Janas	Aaron Chen	January 30, 2020	TBD
When the mice have their juice stand destroyed by Sam, they call on Darkbat to save the day.
132b	28b	"Slugsworthy's Slop House"	Ian Wasseluk	Story by : Frank Caeti; Teleplay by : Matt Craig	Andrew Dickman	January 30, 2020	TBD
Bugs and Squeaks eat at Slugsworthy's Slop House and they teach Slugsworthy the First a lesson in treating the customer right.
133a	29a	"Cal-umbus"	Erik Knutson	Kevin Fleming and Rob Janas	Rich Arons	January 30, 2020	TBD
When Cal-umbus discovers the New World, he tries to eat Bugs.
133b	29b	"Porky Pigskin"	Erik Knutson	Matt Craig, Kevin Fleming, & Rob Janas	Dave Kupcyzk	January 30, 2020	TBD
Porky wants to live his dream and play football for the Fighting Foghorns, so he tries out for the team. Special Guest: Sean Astin as himself
134a	30a	"Riverboat Rabbit"	Sean Petrilak	Matt Craig, Kevin Fleming, and Rob Janas	Alec Megibben	January 30, 2020	TBD
When Bugs and his small boat are run over by a giant riverboat captained by Sam, Bugs boards the ship and gets revenge on the captain.
134b	30b	"Dorlock, P. I."	Sean Petrilak	Kevin Fleming and Rob Janas	Joey Adams	January 30, 2020	TBD
In yet another sequel to Deduce, You Say!, when a theft occurs at the local art museum, it is up to Dorlock Homes to solve the case.
135a	31a	"To Be the Flea, You Gotta Beat the Flea"	Ian Wasseluk	Kevin Fleming and Rob Janas	Mike Ruocco	January 30, 2020	TBD
After being told that he is too small to wrestle for the championship, Angelo the Mighty Flea sets up residence on Marc Anthony and takes control of his body.
135b	31b	"The Wild Blue Blunder"	Ian Wasseluk	Kevin Fleming and Rob Janas	Joey Adams and Ernie Keen	January 30, 2020	TBD
Bugs returns to his summer home, only to find it under attack by fighter pilot Sam.
136a	32a	"Thomas Fuddison"	Erik Knutson	Kevin Fleming and Rob Janas	Aaron Chen	January 30, 2020	TBD
Thomas Fuddison hires Daffy to be his lab assistant and to help him with his latest invention, the electric light bulb.
136b	32b	"Hiccups and Downs"	Erik Knutson	Story by : Matt Craig; Teleplay by : Kevin Fleming and Rob Janas	Andrew Dickman	January 30, 2020	TBD
Porky tries to help Bugs get rid of his hiccups.
137a	33a	"Foghorn Foods"	Sean Petrilak	Story by : Matt Craig; Teleplay by : Kevin Fleming and Rob Janas	Dave Kupczyk	January 30, 2020	TBD
When Foghorn Leghorn opens a high-end grocery and rips everyone off with high prices, Daffy pays a visit. Note: Porky makes a cameo appearance in this episode.
137b	33b	"Cruise Control"	Sean Petrilak	Kevin Fleming and Rob Janas	Rich Arons	January 30, 2020	TBD
Bugs competes with Cecil to see who can have the best vacation.
138a	34a	"Versailles's Matters"	Ian Wasseluk	Story by : Matt Craig; Teleplay by : Kevin Fleming and Rob Janas	Joey Adams	January 30, 2020	TBD
Blacque Jacque Shellacque is enjoying his ornate palace, but when Bugs lodges a complaint, he throws him off the premises.
138b	34b	"Frank Lloyd Wrong"	Ian Wasseluk	Kevin Fleming and Rob Janas	Alec Meggiben	January 30, 2020	TBD
Daffy is building his next home and things get complicated when he hires Curt and Punkinhead Martin.
139	35	"King Bugs and the Island of Lunacy"	Erik Knutson	Matt Craig, Kevin Fleming, and Rob Janas	Mike Ruocco (Episode 1); Nick Leysens (Episode 2)	January 30, 2020	TBD
King Bugs and his friends Porky and Daffy journey to the Island of Lunacy in search of the Sword of Rothgar. Special Guest: "Weird Al" Yankovic as Weird and Al.
140a	36a	"Swamp and Circumstance"	Sean Petrilak	Story by : Matt Craig; Teleplay by : Kevin Fleming and Rob Janas	Aaron Chen	January 30, 2020	TBD
Porky and Sylvester go on a vacation to the Okeefenookie Swamp. Note: Elmer Fudd makes a silent cameo appearance.
140b	36b	"Safari, So Goodie"	Sean Petrilak	Story by : Matt Craig; Teleplay by : Kevin Fleming and Rob Janas	Joey Adams and Andrew Dickman	January 30, 2020	TBD
Mr. Montygrabs chooses Bugs to be the safari guide instead of Leslie.
141a	37a	"It's Snout or Never"	Ian Wasseluk	Kevin Fleming and Rob Janas	Rich Arons	January 30, 2020	TBD
When Witch Hazel needs a pig's snout to finish her ugly potion, she tries to catch one unsuspected sightseer - Porky Pig.
141b	37b	"From Dusk Till Dog"	Ian Wasseluk	Story by : Jeff Prezenkowski; Teleplay by : Matt Craig	Dave Kupczyk	January 30, 2020	TBD
Count Bloodcount tasks Marc Anthony to guard his coffin while he sleeps through the night.
142a	38a	"Close Encounters of the Duck Kind"	Erik Knutson	Story by : Rebecca Sage Allen; Teleplay by : Matt Craig, Kevin Fleming, and Rob Janas	Alec Megibben	January 30, 2020	TBD
Daffy flies into a satellite and crash lands into Area 51, where he is mistaken for an alien and captured by Sam. Note: Marvin the Martian makes an appearance.
142b	38b	"O. M. Genie"	Erik Knutson	Story by : Bob Dassie; Teleplay by : Matt Craig, Kevin Fleming, and Rob Janas	Joey Adams	January 30, 2020	TBD
Daffy and Porky stumble upon a lamp with a magical genie inside.
143a	39a	"Brothers in Harms"	Sean Petrilak	Kevin Fleming and Rob Janas	Mike Ruocco	January 30, 2020	TBD
When Yosemite Sam's twin brother, Yosemite Jack, comes to visit, all of Sam's neighbors take their anger out on Jack instead of Sam. Special Guest: Jack McBrayer as Yosemite Jack
143b	39b	"Rhoda Derby"	Sean Petrilak	Kevin Fleming and Rob Janas	Nick Leysens	January 30, 2020	TBD
Rhoda is beaten in the Roller Derby by Lola, so Rhoda challenges her to a rematch.
144a	40a	"Lake, Rattle and Roll"	Ian Wasseluk	Story by : Katie Nahnsen; Teleplay by : Matt Craig	Joey Adams, Aaron Chen, and Mike Ruocco	January 30, 2020	TBD
Bugs shows up to Lake Funsite Summer Camp to receive training as camp counselor.
144b	40b	"It Paint All It's Cracked Up to Be"	Ian Wasseluk	Kevin Fleming and Rob Janas	Andrew Dickman	January 30, 2020	TBD
When Elmer hires Sylvester, Claude and Pete Puma to paint his house. They cause trouble to it, much to Elmer's annoyance.
145a	41a	"Samurai Bugs"	Erik Knutson	Kevin Fleming and Rob Janas	Rich Arons	January 30, 2020	TBD
When Cal the Samurai terrorizes villages in feudal Japan, it is up to Bugs to stop him.
145b	41b	"Duck in the Mist"	Erik Knutson	Kevin Fleming and Rob Janas	Dave Kupczyk	January 30, 2020	TBD
Tad Tucker tries to film a nature documentary, but he is constantly interrupted by Daffy, who is trying to make it more entertaining.
146	42	"The Loonies"	Sean Petrilak	Matt Craig, Kevin Fleming, and Rob Janas	Alec Megibben (Episode 1); Joey Adams (Episode 2)	January 30, 2020	TBD
Porky is searching for the lost treasure of Sliverboots the Pirate. When treasure hunter Daffy comes to help, he does more harm than good. Note: This is Sean Astin's second appearance.
147	43	"Dorlock Vice"	Ian Wasseluk	Kevin Fleming and Rob Janas	David Shair (Episode 1); Nick Leysens (Episode 2)	January 30, 2020	TBD
Florida police detectives Cloudy Dorlock and Ricardo Pigs have to find crime boss Mr. Big. Special Guest: Mark Hamill as Hans Hamster and Mr. Big and Danny Trejo as the Lieutenant
148	44	"Armageddon Outta Here"	Erik Knutson	Matt Craig, Kevin Fleming, and Rob Janas	Aaron Chen (Episode 1); Andrew Dickman (Episode 2)	January 30, 2020	TBD
The gang teams up to stop an asteroid from destroying Earth. Special Guests: Axl Rose as himself and Jared Harris as the Asteroid
149a	45a	"Substitute Porky"	Sean Petrilak	Story by : Jeff Prezenkowski; Teleplay by : Kevin Fleming and Rob Janas	Rich Arons	January 30, 2020	TBD
Substitute teacher Porky Pig is assigned to instruct the most troublesome student in the world: Daffy Duck.
149b	45b	"Viktor the Psychic"	Sean Petrilak	Story by : Katie Nahnsen; Teleplay by : Matt Craig	Dave Kupczyx	January 30, 2020	TBD
When TV psychic Viktor swindles Squeaks out of his money, Bugs exposes him as a fraud.
150a	46a	"Formula One Bunny"	Ian Wasseluk	Story by : Frank Caeti; Teleplay by : Kevin Fleming and Rob Janas	Alec Megibben	January 30, 2020	TBD
Bugs goes up against Cecil in a Formula One Grand Prix.
150b	46b	"Daffy Goes to Hollywood"	Ian Wasseluk	Story by : Rebecca Sage Allen; Teleplay by : Matt Craig	Joey Adams	January 30, 2020	TBD
When Elmer casts Daffy as a star in his commercial, he quickly realizes the error of his judgement.
151a	47a	"A Duck in the Laundromat"	Erik Knutson	Story by : Bob Dassie; Teleplay by : Matt Craig, Kevin Fleming and Rob Janas	David Shair	January 30, 2020	TBD
Con man Foghorn Leghorn overcharges people for their dry cleaning, but meets his match when Daffy comes in and causes havoc.
151b	47b	"Primo Bugs-erino"	Erik Knutson	Kevin Fleming and Rob Janas	Nick Leysens	January 30, 2020	TBD
Leslie wants to be the Primo Ballerino, but Bugs also auditions for the ballet.
152	48	"The Silly Six"	Sean Petrilak	Matt Craig, Kevin Fleming and Rob Janas	Aaron Chen (Episode 1); Andrew Dickman (Episode 2)	January 30, 2020	TBD
When stagecoach driver Bugs finds out Reginald plans to blow up Tombstone City and build a huge toaster oven factory, he recruits Sam, Elmer, Blacques Jacques, and Curt and Punkinhead to stop him. Special Guest: Diedrich Bader as Reginald St. Archibald
153a	49a	"Out of Towner Alien Encounter"	Ian Wasseluk	Matt Craig, Kevin Fleming and Rob Janas	Rich Arons	January 30, 2020	TBD
Marvin kidnaps Bugs and forces Bugs to help him take over Earth.
153b	49b	"Down Horace-Scope"	Ian Wasseluk	Kevin Fleming and Rob Janas	Dave Kupczyk	January 30, 2020	TBD
Horace and Porky go under cover on a submarine to capture its captain, who they suspect is stealing all the sponges from the bottom of the ocean.
154a	50a	"The Magnificent Millicent"	Joey Adams	Kevin Fleming and Rob Janas	Joey Adams	January 30, 2020	TBD
Bugs must survive the unorthodox training methods of world-famous gymnastics coach Millicent.
154b	50b	"The Wrong Stuff"	Joey Adams	Matt Craig, Kevin Fleming and Rob Janas	Alec Megibben	January 30, 2020	TBD
Daffy is launched into space to become the first being to walk on the Moon, but the Martin Brothers crash the party. Note: Marvin the Martian makes an appearance.
155	51	"Undercover Bunny"	Sean Petrilak	Matt Craig, Kevin Fleming and Rob Janas	David Shair (Episode 1); Nick Leysens (Episode 2)	January 30, 2020	TBD
Bugs is tricked by evil spy Foxy Foxworth into stealing a super laser; after he realizes his mistake, he has to team up with Pepé and Claudette to stop her. Special Guests: India de Beaufort as Foxy Foxworth and Lance Henriksen as Ironbootay
156	52	"The Legend of Burrito Monday"	Ian Wasseluk	Matt Craig, Kevin Flemming and Rob Janas	Aaron Chen (Episode 1); Andrew Dickman (Episode 2)	January 30, 2020	TBD
Billionaire Elmer needs to learn the true meaning of Burrito Monday, the holiday when all the people of the world treat each other to a delicious burrito. Note: This is Sean Astin's third appearance and this is the series finale.
