= Bugg (disambiguation) =

Bugg is a common dance style in Sweden.

Bugg may also refer to:

- Bugg (surname), including a list of people with the name
- Bugg, Kentucky, an unincorporated community in Hickman County, U.S.
- Bugg Spring, a spring near Okahumpka in Lake County, Florida, U.S.

== See also ==
- Bug (disambiguation)
- Edison Bugg's Invention, a 1916 silent comedy film featuring Oliver Hardy
- Fyra Bugg & en Coca Cola ('Four chewing gums and a Coca Cola'), a 1987 music album by Lotta Engberg
