= Bugged =

Bugged may refer to:

- Bugged!, a 1997 horror-comedy film distributed by Troma
- Bugged (album), a 2000 album by Babybird
- "Bugged" (Blood Ties), an episode of Blood Ties
- "Bugged" (Family Matters), an episode of Family Matters
- "Bugged", an episode of Delilah & Julius
- Bugged, to have placed, or to have been monitored by, a covert listening device

== See also ==
- Bug (disambiguation)
