= Bugsy (disambiguation) =

Bugsy is a 1991 film about the American gangster Bugsy Siegel.

Bugsy may also refer to:

== Nickname ==
- Bugsy Siegel (1906–1947), American gangster, founder and leader of Murder Inc.
- John Cunningham (Northern Ireland footballer), football coach and former player
- Martin Goldstein (1905–1941), American mobster and member of Murder Inc.
- Leo Koceski (born 1929), American collegiate football player
- Bugsy Nyskohus (born 1950), Australian former association football player Bohdan Nyskohus
- Bryan Watson (ice hockey) (1942–2021), Canadian National Hockey League player
- Bugsy Moran, gangster

== Other uses ==
- Bugs Bunny, a Looney Tunes character
- Bugsy McGraw (born 1945), ring name of former professional wrestler Michael Davis
- Stomy Bugsy (born 1972), stage name of French rapper Gilles Duarte
- The title character of Bugsy Malone, a 1976 musical film
- Bugsy (video game), a 1986 text-adventure game
- Bugsy, a character portrayed by James Russo in the 1984 film Once Upon a Time in America
- "Bugsy", an obsolete synonym for "crazy"

== See also ==
- Bugs (disambiguation)
- Bugs (nickname)
