= Enric Bug =

Spanish comic book author and industrial designer (born 1957)

Enric Bug, also Enric Bug Lapedra, pseudonym Bug Rogers (born 15 April 1957) is a Spanish comic book writer and industrial designer.

== Career ==
Enric Bug Lapedra was born in Portbou on 15 April 1957. He is the only son of Enric Bug Ramis, railroad worker from Portbou, and Carmen Lapedra Terrades from Figueres. At the age of 16, the self-taught artist began designing posters. In 1978 he debuted with the comic The Speed Kills, which appeared in Star magazine. 1978 he created the cover for a single featuring the song Himne De La Unió of brass band Banda Tramuntana. In 1979 he moved to Barcelona, where he worked for the publishing house Producciones Editoriales. Here he continued to design Underground comix for Star, a publication that later continued under the title Bésame Mucho. In the 1970s and 1980s both magazines were considered alternative and avant-garde. Other publications such as music magazine Vibraciones, Rampa, Rambla, Rock Espezial, Diari de Barcelona and Playboy also printed his work. In reference to science fiction hero Buck Rogers, he adopted the pseudonym Bug Rogers, which he used to sign his works.

In his comics, Enric Bug created a "pop universe" that often featured "Hollywood stars, femmes fatales and fast vehicles." In Rockabilly de verano, he created a 1950s setting with a main character reminiscent of Elvis Presley, who was "surrounded by Cadillacs, motorcycles and explosive girls." His work often showed "luscious ladies in pop colours and psychedelic turbulences". As Bug Rogers, he formed part of a collective of artists comprising Carmelo Hernando, Pere Fortuny, Luis García, Elvira Navares, Pepe Cánovas, Mari Carmen Vilá and Never Mind which in 1980 created the comic series La Astronomía Pirata, published by Ikusager Ediciones. The group was credited with having "remodelled the themes, content and aesthetics of comics." Bug founded the company Bug Rogers + Comets for marketing his illustrations und comic art.

After working as a comic artist, Enric Bug dedicated himself to interior and industrial design, for which he founded the company Grup Simple. He worked as an illustrator and created graphic designs for numerous nightclubs along the Costa Brava, amongst them Fata Morgana in Sant Pere Pescador, Charly in Figueres, Picasso in Roses as well as a variety of placards for Chic in Roses from 1980 to 1987, one of the best known Spanish discothèques at the time. He also created table lamps for the club Charly in 1994 as well as other decorative items made of beech and pine wood, in a style inspired by Art Deco.

In the mid-1980s, and again in Art-deco-style, Enric Bug designed two sculptures titled Taus (male) and Alix (female), both of anthropomorphic, robot-like appearance with the absence of facial expression, each holding a fluorescent tube. Taus was used as a prop on the set of the movie Batman (1989) and Alix in The Two Jakes (1990). Bug also designed the Collection Abstract for Febrer, consisting of six different mannequins in a similar futuristic style, as well as some furniture. He continued to create posters, such as one for Fira del Disc de Girona in 1995. From 1997 to 1998 he attended Escola d'art d'Olot, studying industrial and product design. In the 2010s he created coloured psychedelic pin-ups with pencil, ink and watercolour techniques, as well as computer-generated futuristic illustrations.

Enric Bug showed his work at collective exhibitions such as Catalunya vista des de l'exterior of Banco Exterior de España (Barcelona, 1980), Tintin a Barcelona of the foundation Fundació Joan Miró (Barcelona, 1984), Art al carrer (Figueres, 1984), Col-lectiva JAF (Joventuts Artístiques de Figueres, 1985), Rock al Museu in Museu de l'Empordà (Figueres, 1996) or Pangrama at Galeria Canaleta (Figueres, 1996). In June 2011, he exhibited a retrospective of his work at Espai d'Art del Celler Espelt in Vilajuïga. In another solo exhibition titled F.A.C.E.S, he presented portraits of celebrities at Galeria Aljub in Figueres in 2014.

The artist lives in Figueres.

== Publications (selection) ==
- The Speed Kills. Star 41, 1978 (debut)
- Chewing gum. Star 46, 1979
- How to Make Up. Star 44–48, 1979
- Blues de la ciudad. Bésame Mucho 5, Producciones Editoriales S.A., November 1980
- El Misterio del Cadillac negro. Bésame Mucho 6, Producciones Editoriales S.A., December 1980
- Magazine cover and Nivel.B52. Bésame Mucho 10, Producciones Editoriales S.A., April 1981
- Candy. Bésame Mucho 12, Producciones Editoriales S.A., June 1981
- Rockabilly de verano. Bésame Mucho 13, Producciones Editoriales S.A., July 198
- Rockabilly de verano. Bésame Mucho 14, Producciones Editoriales S.A., August 1981
- Rockabilly de verano. Bésame Mucho 15, Producciones Editoriales S.A., September 1981
- Misión destruir Alien. Bésame Mucho 16, Producciones Editoriales S.A., October 1981
- Lucky el zurdo. Bésame Mucho 20, Producciones Editoriales S.A., Februar 1982
- Magazine cover and Lucky el zurdo. La dama negra. Bésame Mucho 21, Producciones Editoriales S.A., March 1982
- Lucky el zurdo. Bésame Mucho 22, Producciones Editoriales S.A., March 1982
- Lucky el zurdo. Bésame Mucho 23, Producciones Editoriales S.A., April 1982
- Lucky el zurdo. Bésame Mucho 24, Producciones Editoriales S.A., June 1982
- Magazine cover and Lucky el Zurdo. Bésame Mucho 26, Producciones Editoriales S.A., August 1982

== Literature ==
- Inés Padrosa Gorgot: Diccionari biogràfic de l’Alt Empordà. Diputació, Girona 2009, ISBN 978-84-96747-54-8, p. 155.
- José Manuel Lechado, José Manuel Lechado García: La movida. Una crónica de los 80. EDAF, Madrid 2005, ISBN 84-96107-46-9, p. 198.
