= New Looney Tunes =

American animated television series

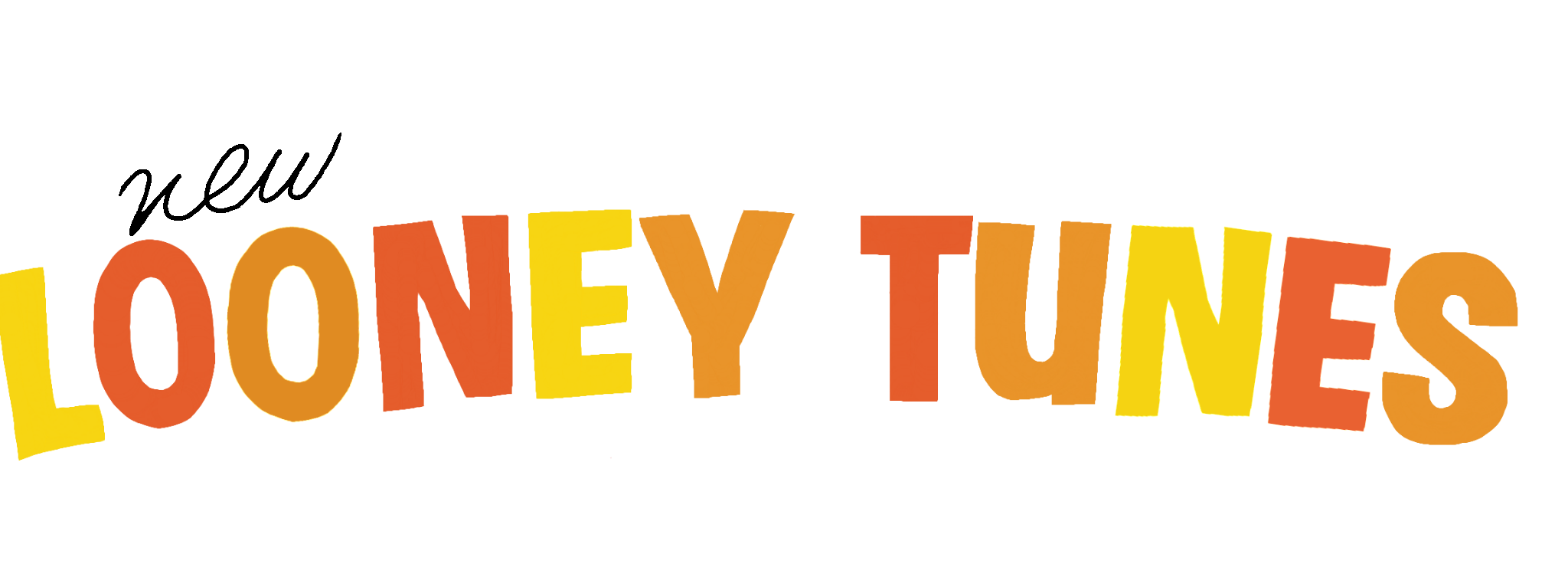
- Genre: Comedy; Slapstick
- Based on: Looney Tunes and Merrie Melodies by Warner Bros.
- Developed by: Matt Craig; Erik Kuska
- Written by: Matt Craig; Kevin Fleming; Rob Janas
- Voices of: Jeff Bergman; Dee Bradley Baker; Kath Soucie; Bob Bergen; Paul Julian (archive audio); J. P. Karliak; Maurice LaMarche (season 1); Fred Tatasciore; Jim Cummings; Eric Bauza
- Theme music composer: Joshua Funk (season 1); Cliff Friend and Dave Franklin (arranged by Joshua Funk, season 2)
- Opening theme: "Wabbit Theme" (season 1); "The Merry-Go-Round Broke Down" (seasons 2–3)
- Ending theme: "Wabbit Theme" (season 1); "The Merry-Go-Round Broke Down" (seasons 2–3)
- Composer: Joshua Funk
- Country of origin: United States
- Original language: English
- No. of seasons: 3
- No. of episodes: 156 (312 segments) (list of episodes)

Production
- Executive producer: Sam Register
- Producers: Matt Craig; Gary Hartle
- Editor: Robby Wells
- Running time: 11 minutes (2 segments of 5½ minutes or 1 special segment)
- Production company: Warner Bros. Animation

Original release
- Network: Cartoon Network; Boomerang; Boomerang SVOD
- Release: September 21, 2015 – January 30, 2020

Related
- The Looney Tunes Show (2011–2013); Looney Tunes Cartoons (2020–2024)

New Looney Tunes (originally titled Wabbit: A Looney Tunes Production in the United States, and Bugs! in some markets for its first season) is an American animated television series from Warner Bros. Animation based on the characters from Looney Tunes and Merrie Melodies. The series debuted on September 21, 2015, on Cartoon Network, and continued with new episodes beginning on October 5, 2015, on Boomerang. Partway through the first season, new episodes would premiere on Boomerang's video on demand service before airing on television.

On May 23, 2018, the Boomerang streaming service announced that New Looney Tunes would continue into 2019, with the third season being the show's last. The final episodes were released on January 30, 2020. The series was followed by the more traditionally formatted Looney Tunes Cartoons on May 27, 2020, which is streaming on HBO Max.

== Production ==
Promotional poster for "Wabbit" featuring Squeaks and Bugs, as drawn in a promotional still. (Early press kits give Squeaks a different appearance, alongside Bugs.)

After The Looney Tunes Show ended production in 2013, concepts for a new show featuring the Looney Tunes began to be discussed. At the time, the idea of a reboot focused mainly on Bugs Bunny emerged, and in March 2014, it was announced that the reboot would be known as Wabbit or Bugs! depending in the region. Sam Register, promoted to president of Warner Bros. Animation and Warner Digital Series a month prior, became supervising producer for the series. The animation was done by Yearim and Rough Draft Studios from South Korea (the latter only working on the first season) and Snipple Animation from the Philippines.

The aim of the reboot was for its cartoons to match the tone of the Looney Tunes shorts in their earlier days. This led to the characters returning to their slapstick comedy roots, but with producers seeking to avoid their clichés, such as the anvil gag. The show's production team placed their emphasis on writing original stories, as well as devising "modern heavy objects to cause pain", according to producer Erik Kuska, with each episode featuring a few shorts in which one or a number of characters became caught up in a situation that they would handle in their own personal way. Despite that, some classic objects can occasionally be seen, such as boulders or safes. Similarly, some classic expressions can be heard, such as Bugs forgetting to "make that left turn at Albuquerque", or uttering "of course you know, this means war". The characters themselves saw some alterations to their appearances, with some also reverting to personality traits they originally had in their earliest appearances. For example, Daffy Duck was reverted to his original screwball personality from his early shorts.

The first season of the show was known as Wabbit and focused on the misadventures of Bugs Bunny, with a supporting cast of Yosemite Sam, Wile E. Coyote and Porky Pig, and cameo appearances by Daffy Duck, Foghorn Leghorn, Elmer Fudd, the Tasmanian Devil and Michigan J. Frog. Like his early shorts, Bugs mostly finds himself in a battle of wits with opponents either because they seek to hurt him or have done something to wreck his peaceful life. The first season saw the introduction of a few new characters to the Looney Tunes franchise, many of them being new villains Bugs faces.

According to Kuska, the focus on new enemies for Bugs to face off against was described as allowing him to do his "best when he's up against a really good adversary". As a result of the inclusion of new villains, Kuska felt that Elmer Fudd might not be "the man" anymore, having often been a common rival that Bugs fought with in many shorts, despite appearing later on in the series.

After the first season ended, the production team decided to expand the focus to other Looney Tunes stars; thus, the show was retooled and renamed New Looney Tunes for the second season and featured a new intro with music based on the classic Looney Tunes theme song, "The Merry-Go-Round Broke Down". The second season saw the addition of stories centering around Daffy Duck, Porky Pig, Sylvester, Tweety, Granny, Elmer Fudd, Yosemite Sam, Wile E. Coyote and the Road Runner, the Tasmanian Devil, Foghorn Leghorn, Speedy Gonzales, Pepé Le Pew, Marvin the Martian, Witch Hazel, Petunia Pig, and Lola Bunny. Some episodes saw characters operating as a double act (a plot mechanic mainly used for Daffy and Porky, as had been done in the classic shorts). Several supporting, recurring and minor figures from the classic Looney Tunes shorts such as Michigan J. Frog, Sniffles, Hubie and Bertie, the Goofy Gophers, Claude Cat, Marc Antony and Pussyfoot, Cecil Turtle, Gabby Goat, and Blacque Jacque Shellacque also made appearances.

Season 3 featured Axl Rose as a guest star in the episode "Armageddon Outta Here" and featured his first studio recording since 2008.

== New characters ==
Among the new characters introduced in this show are:

- Squeaks the Squirrel – A red squirrel who is Bugs' neighbor and best friend, whose speech initially consisted only of squeaking sounds (occasionally giving way to intelligible speech in season 3).
- Bigfoot – A childlike sasquatch who tends to follow Bugs, usually calling him "lady" (or occasionally "ma'am"), much to Bugs' frustration.
- The Barbarian – An unnamed barbarian that feuds with Bugs.
  - Krakos – The Barbarian's polar bear mount. His name is a play on the Greek mythical figure Kratos.
- Boyd – A lovesick bird.
- Cal – A huge man who considers himself the best at everything.
- Carl the Grim Rabbit – A Grim Reaper look-alike with rabbit ears and a carrot scythe who is trying to reap Bugs's soul.
- Claudette Dupri – A female fox spy who speaks with a heavy French accent. She serves as Pepé Le Pew's partner.
- Dr. Clovenhoof – A sheep scientist who always bring Bugs to his Lab to show him off his new inventions.
- Eagle Scout – A lonely eagle scoutmaster who is a talented rapper and longs for friends.
- Elliot Sampson – A bobcat scoutmaster and businessman.
- Hazmats – As Bugs puts it, they are a group of "highly trained government officials" in hazmat suits that often pursue or hunt him, Squeaks, and Bigfoot, as well as Agents Dupri and Le Pew.
- Horace the Horse – A uniformed horse who often works with Porky and speaks in the style of John Travolta.
- Ivanna – A woman who often encroaches on Bugs' territory. She hosts the show "Gettin' Fresh! with Ivanna" on "The Food Notwork".
- Jack – A "jack of all trades" who does various work. This character was dropped after only two appearances because his personality traits (including his scream) were deemed too similar to Yosemite Sam.
- King Thes – A royal lion who tries to eat anyone.
- Leslie P. Lilylegs – A mean-spirited short man who tends to desire power while working for his different bosses.
- Miss Cougar – A spinster cougar who tries to eat Bugs.
- Pampreen and Paul Perdy – Leslie's two spoiled grandchildren.
- Rhoda Roundhouse – A female wrestler.
- Shameless O’Scanty – An unlucky leprechaun.
- Sir Littlechin – A knight who often hunts mythical animals.
- Slugsworthy the First – A stuck-up elephant seal who wants to be first in everything.
- Squint Eatswood – A bigoted beaver who hates anyone who is not a beaver. His name is a play on Clint Eastwood.
- Tad Tucker – An Australian reality television personality with a strong appetite for rabbits.
- Trey Hugger – An environmental activist. His name is a play on the slang "tree hugger".
- Viktor – A narcissistic man who likes to brag about being the best in everything. He appears in "Abracawabbit" as a stage magician called "Viktor Mageek", "Viktor the Science Swede" as a scientist, "Fashion Viktor" as a fashion designer, among other episodes. Along with him in each of his appearances are three young groupies who appear to idolize him, though they later start to idolize Bugs.
- Winter Stag – A cryokinetic deer who can't stand hot weather and uses his cryokinetic ability to turn hot weather into cold weather. He also hates stereotyping.

== Voice cast ==
=== Main cast ===
- Jeff Bergman – Bugs Bunny / Elmer Fudd / Sylvester the Cat / Foghorn Leghorn / Michigan J. Frog / Mac Gopher / Giant
- Dee Bradley Baker – Daffy Duck / Squeaks Squirrel / Frisky Puppy / Carl the Grim Rabbit ("The Grim Rabbit") / Krakos the Polar Bear / Shifty Rat / Mannermaid Enforski / Justin
- Bob Bergen – Porky Pig / Tweety Bird / Gabby Goat / Clyde Bunny
- Kath Soucie – Lola Bunny / Sniffles / Claudette Dupri / Pampreen Perdy
- Maurice LaMarche – Yosemite Sam (season 1)
- Fred Tatasciore – Yosemite Sam (seasons 2 and 3) / Carl the Grim Rabbit ("Grim on Vacation" - onwards)
- J. P. Karliak – Wile E. Coyote / King Nutininkommen
- Paul Julian – Road Runner (archive audio)
- Jim Cummings – Tasmanian Devil / Blacque Jacque Shellacque / Liam Luxurious
- Eric Bauza – Agent P. / Marvin the Martian / Hubie (season 3) / Bertie (season 3) / Rock Hardcase / Cal

=== Supporting cast ===
- Jeff Bennett – Hubie Rat / Bertie Mouse (both in Wabbit!) / Dr. Clovenhoof / Horace the Horse / Winter Stag
- Matt Craig – Cecil Turtle / Tosh Gopher / Marc Antony Bulldog / Count Bloodcount / Hazmats / Trey Hugger / Paul Perdy / Pacifico Mule / Minnesota Rats / Curt Martin / Pizza Guy / Red Omaha / Mrs. Troll
- John Kassir – Pete Puma / Claude Cat / John
- Matthew Mercer – Bigfoot
- Candi Milo – Granny / Witch Hazel / Ivana / Bear Scout / Weasel Scout / Mrs. Allen / Phoebe
- Dino Andrade – Speedy Gonzales

=== Special guest stars ===
- Snoop Dogg – Himself
- Axl Rose – Himself
- Sean Astin – Himself

=== Additional voices ===
- Carlos Alazraqui – Leslie P. Lilylegs / Shameless O. Scanty / Elliot Sampson Bobcat / Tad Tucker / Rick
- Diedrich Bader – Reginald St. Archibald
- Steve Blum – Jack / Barbarian
- Jessica DiCicco – Petunia Pig
- John DiMaggio – Slugsworthy the First
- Keith Ferguson – Viktor
- Grey Griffin – Vera Vulture / Millicent
- Jared Harris – Asteroid
- Richard Steven Horvitz – Impkin the Pumpkin King
- Mikey Kelley – Boyd
- Matthew Yang King – Raccoon Scout
- Jack McBrayer – Yosemite Jack
- Daran Norris – Sir Littlechin / Punkinhead Martin / DarkBat / Johnny Grambus / King
- Kevin Michael Richardson – King Thes / Snorts
- Tara Strong – Miss Cougar
- Jim Ward – Squint Eatswood
- "Weird Al" Yankovic – Weird and Al
- Cedric Yarbrough – Eagle Scout
- Lance Henriksen – Ironbootay
- India de Beaufort – Foxy Foxworth
- Mark Hamill – Hans Hamster
- Danny Trejo – Lieutenant

=== Voice directors ===
- Charlie Adler (season 1)
- Collette Sunderman (seasons 2 and 3)

== Episodes ==
Season	Episodes	Originally released		
Season	Episodes	First released	Last released	Network
1	52	September 21, 2015	February 8, 2018	Cartoon Network (episodes 1–22); Boomerang (episodes 23–52); Boomerang SVOD
2	52	February 8, 2018	January 31, 2019	Boomerang SVOD; Boomerang
3	52	August 29, 2019	January 30, 2020	Boomerang SVOD; Boomerang

== Broadcast ==
Wabbit premiered on September 21, 2015, on Cartoon Network and on Boomerang beginning October 5, 2015, then went on hiatus for over a year and return on April 7, 2017. The series premiered on November 2 on Boomerang in Australia and New Zealand and on Boomerang in the United Kingdom and Ireland. It premiered on November 6, 2015, on Teletoon in Canada and debuted on December 19 on Boomerang in the Middle East and Africa. In India, the series premiered on Pogo TV on December 19, 2015. The series premiered on January 17, 2016, on Cartoon Network Arabic in the Middle East.

New episodes began being broadcast on Boomerang, starting April 7, 2017.

Season 2 premiered on Boomerang UK on September 4, 2017.

The entire first season is available on Netflix in Canada.

The show was available on the Boomerang premium subscription service until it shut down in 2024. As of July 4, 2020, the show is available for streaming on Max in the United States. However, a few episodes from seasons 1 and 2 and the entire third season are not yet on the platform.

Season	Timeslot (ET)	Episodes	Premiered		Ended		Viewers (in millions)
Season	Timeslot (ET)	Episodes	Date	Premiere viewers (in millions)	Date	Finale viewers (in millions)	Viewers (in millions)
1 for Boomerang	Weekdays 8:00 p.m. (episodes 1–12); Monday 8:00 p.m. (episode 13–19); Saturday 7:00 p.m. (episodes 20–22); Friday 1:45 a.m. (episode 23); Weeknights 2:15 a.m. (episode 24-26)	52	October 5, 2015	0.28	TBA	TBA	
1 for CN	Weekdays 5:00 p.m. (episodes 1–12); Thursday 5:00 p.m. (episode 13); Thursday 2:00 p.m. (episode 14); Thursday 8:45 a.m. (episode 15); Saturday 10:00 a.m. (episodes 16–20); Saturday 9:45 a.m. (episodes 21-22)	52	September 21, 2015	1.24	TBA	TBA	1.59

== Home media ==
The first half of Season 1 of Wabbit was released onto DVD on April 26, 2016, in the United States. Despite being half of a season, the DVD is subtitled, Hare-Raising Tales. The DVD contains the first 26 episodes (52 segments) but is labeled on the side as Season 1 – Part 1. The DVD contains episodes 23–26 which did not air in the United States until April 7, 2017. Disregarding the show's European name, Wabbit: Season 1 – Part 1 was also released on June 15, 2016, in Australia, and on July 25, 2016, in the United Kingdom.
