= Bugs (nickname) =

Bugs is a nickname for:

- Arthur "Bugs" Baer (1886–1969), American journalist
- Bugs Bennett (1892–1957), Major League Baseball pitcher
- Bugs Bunny, a Warner Brothers cartoon character
- Bob Bugden (1936–2023), Australian former professional rugby league footballer
- Ben "Bugs" Hardaway (1895–1957), American storyboard artist, animator, voice actor, gagman, writer and director
- Bugs Henderson (1943–2012), blues guitarist
- Fred Kommers (1886–1943), Major League Baseball outfielder
- Bugs Moran (1892–1957), American gangster
- Bugs Raymond (1882–1912), Major League Baseball pitcher
- Bugs Reisigl (1887–1957), Major League Baseball pitcher
- Bugsy Siegel (1906–1947), American mobster also nicknamed "Bugs"
- Bill Werle (1920–2010), Major League Baseball pitcher

== See also ==
- Bugsy (disambiguation)
