= Museu de l'Empordà =

Empordà Museum
- Museu de l'Empordà
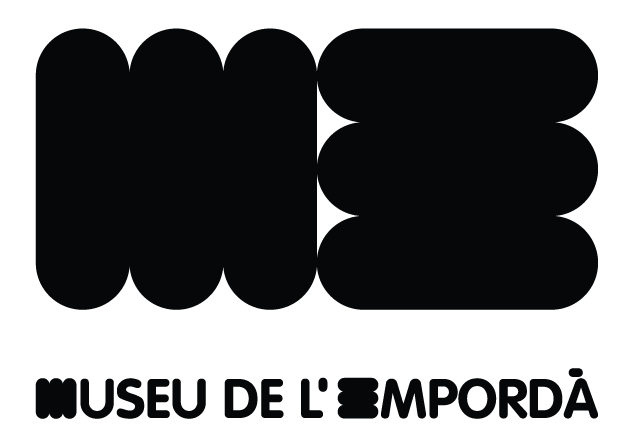

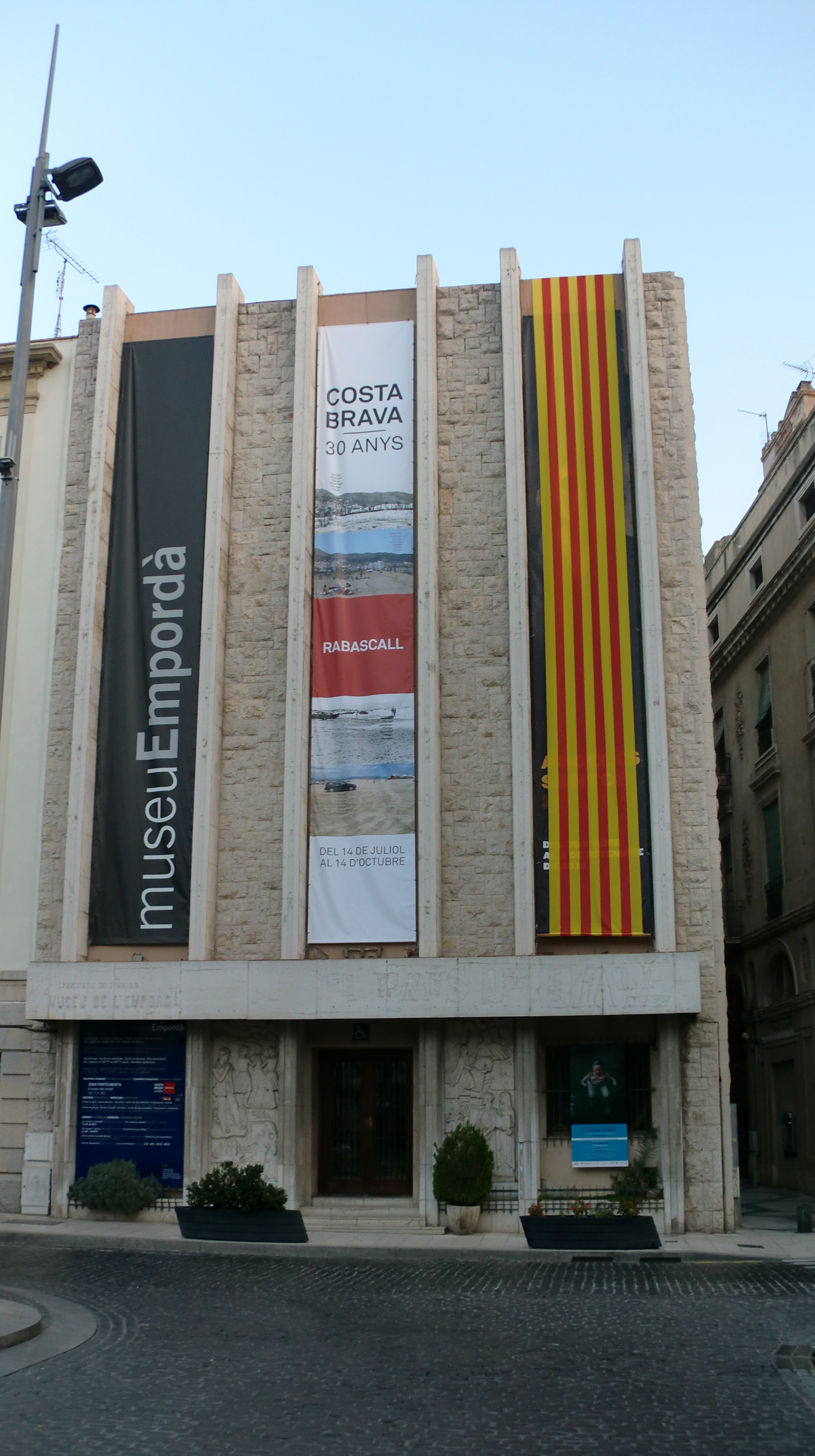
- The museum façade is topped by a series of giant eggs
- Established: 11 June 1946
- Location: Figueres
- Coordinates: 42.2667°N 2.9620°E
- Type: Art museum
- Collections: Modern art, archaeological works, medieval art and Baroque paintings
- Director: Eduard Bech
- Owner: Municipality of Figueres
- Website: www.museuemporda/cat

The Museum of the Empordà is an art museum in Figueres, Catalonia (Spain). Its history dates back to 1885, when the first collections arrived from the Prado Museum, bringing together a collection of artworks from the Catalan art scene (Sorolla, Casas, Nonell, Sacharoff and Tàpies) and the Empordà in particular (Dalí, Santos, Reig, Vallès, Planells, Massanet, Gabriel and Mitjà). The collection includes archaeological works, medieval art and Baroque paintings. Built in 1946, the building was opened in 1971. From 1998 onwards it has been managed by a consortium made up of Figueres Town Council, the Regional Council of Alt Empordà and the Gala-Salvador Dalí Foundation. As of 2015 the consortium has been dissolved, and the museum is managed by the Department of Culture of Figueres Town Council.
