= Molly Erdman =

American actress

- Born: Los Angeles, California, U.S.
- Website: http://www.mollyerdman.com/

Molly Erdman (born 1974) is an American actress, author and improvisational comedian. She is most recognizable for her portrayal of Molly the "snarky wife" in Sonic television commercials. Erdman grew up in Dallas and attended Greenhill School (Addison, Texas), she is a graduate of Tufts University, where she received a degree in Drama minoring in Political Science. She worked with the Tufts improv group Cheap Sox while attending the university. After graduating, she moved to Chicago to work with The Second City, where she appeared in three mainstage revues. She currently lives in LA and writes two blogs devoted to catalog parody, Catalog Living and its spin-off Magazine Living, and in 2012 published the coffee-table book Catalog Living at Its Most Absurd: Decorating Takes (Wicker) Balls.

== Filmography ==
- The Bobby Lee Project (2008)
- According to Jim (1 episode, 2008)
- The Goods: The Don Ready Story (2009)
- In the Flow with Affion Crockett (2011)
