= Bugg (surname) =

Bugg is a surname. Notable people with the surname include:

- Damian Bugg, Australian lawyer and Director of Public Prosecutions 1999–2007
- Francis Bugg (1640–1727), English writer against Quakerism
- George Bugg (1769–1851), Anglican deacon and curate in England and a Scriptural geologist
- James Bugg (1882–1964), Australian politician
- Jace Bugg (1976–2003), American golfer
- Jake Bugg (Jake Edwin Charles Kennedy, born 1994), English musician and songwriter
- Mary Ann Bugg (1834–1867), Australian bushranger
- Matthew Bugg (born 1981), Australian sailor
- Rachel Bugg (born 1989), Australian diver
- Robert Malone Bugg, American politician and a member of the U.S. House of Representatives 1853–1855
- Stuart G. Bugg (born 1958), British-born lawyer and author
- Thomas Bugg, English rugby league footballer of the 1920s
- Tomas Bugg (born 1993), Australian rules footballer
- John Benjamin Bugg (1938-2007) Former Director of Urban Studies and Planning 1973-1991
- Domingo Maurice Bugg (born 1960) Electrical Robotics Engineer

== See also ==
- Bugg (disambiguation)

Media related to Bugg (surname) at Wikimedia Commons
