= Prince Violent =

1961 Looney Tunes film

Prince Violent (Prince Varmint)
- Original issue title card
- Directed by: Friz Freleng; Hawley Pratt
- Story by: Dave Detiege
- Starring: Mel Blanc
- Edited by: Treg Brown
- Music by: Milt Franklyn
- Animation by: Gerry Chiniquy; Virgil Ross; Art Davis; Bob Matz
- Layouts by: Willie Ito
- Backgrounds by: Tom O'Loughlin
- Color process: Technicolor
- Production company: Warner Bros. Cartoons
- Distributed by: Warner Bros. Pictures; Vitagraph Company of America
- Release date: September 2, 1961
- Running time: 6 minutes 21 seconds
- Language: English

Prince Violent (retitled Prince Varmint for television until the 2020s) is a 1961 Warner Bros. Looney Tunes cartoon directed by Friz Freleng and Freleng's longtime layout artist Hawley Pratt. The short was released on September 2, 1961, and stars Bugs Bunny and Yosemite Sam. The title is a pun on "Prince Valiant", a long-running comic strip at the time. The film is a war comedy set in the Viking era.

The film depicts a Viking invasion led by Sam. He easily enters the local castle, but Bugs disarms him and expels him from the castle. Sam's subsequent attempts at a siege are always thwarted by Bugs' imaginative schemes. Sam eventually gives up and leaves the area, though he vows revenge.

== Plot ==
A Viking named Sam the Terrible (Yosemite Sam) embarks on a mission of invasion, rowing towards a castle along a river. Observing his approach, Bugs Bunny, a resident of the castle's vicinity, initially dismisses Sam's attire as resembling a "broken loose electric can opener." However, upon witnessing Sam's forcible entry into the castle, Bugs resolves to confront the intruder.

Engaging Sam in a series of comedic skirmishes, Bugs employs clever tactics to outsmart the Viking. In their initial encounter, Bugs deftly disarms Sam and ridicules his costume, prompting Sam's expulsion from the castle. Subsequent confrontations see Bugs employing imaginative schemes, including painting a faux door on the castle walls and orchestrating the elephant's unwitting involvement in thwarting Sam's siege attempts.

Despite Sam's relentless pursuit, Bugs continuously outwits him, culminating in the Viking's humiliating defeat. Sam's various schemes, including catapulting rocks and mining beneath the castle, are foiled by Bugs' ingenuity and the inadvertent assistance of the elephant.

Ultimately, Sam's frustration escalates as his efforts are consistently thwarted. Vowing revenge against Bugs and the elephant, Sam departs, leaving behind a scene of chaos. As the narrative concludes, Bugs muses on the achievements attainable through resourcefulness, rewarding the elephant with peanuts for its unwitting assistance.

== See also ==
- List of Bugs Bunny cartoons
- List of Yosemite Sam cartoons

Preceded by Compressed Hare	Bugs Bunny Cartoons; 1961	Succeeded by Wet Hare

Preceded by Horse Hare	Yosemite Sam cartoons 1961	Succeeded by Devil's Feud Cake
