= Bugs Bunny filmography =

Bugs Bunny starred in 170 theatrical animated short films of the Looney Tunes and Merrie Melodies series produced by Warner Bros. Cartoons and distributed by Warner Bros. Pictures during the golden age of American animation from 1940 to 1964. He was voiced by vocal artist Mel Blanc, and in later years he was voiced by other vocal artists such as Jeff Bergman, Billy West and Eric Bauza. Also listed are the cartoons featuring the earlier character that evolved into Bugs Bunny, as well as those produced after the golden age of American animation.

== Golden age shorts ==
 Legend

LT
stands for Looney Tunes
MM
stands for Merrie Melodies

=== Prototype shorts as an unnamed rabbit / "Bugs" Bunny ===
Note: Will be counted as separate shorts from Bugs' "official" filmography with Roman numerals.

=== 1938 ===
No.	Title	Original release date	Series	Directed by	Official DVD/Blu-ray Availability	Notes
I	Porky's Hare Hunt	April 30	LT	Ben Hardaway and Cal Dalton	Blu-ray/DVD: Looney Tunes Platinum Collection: Volume 2; DVD: Porky Pig 101	Very first appearance of the Bugs Bunny prototype, as an unnamed white random rabbit; Only Black and White cartoon; with Porky Pig
=== 1939 ===
II	Prest-O Change-O	March 25	MM	Chuck Jones	Blu-ray/DVD: Looney Tunes Platinum Collection: Volume 2	Second appearance of the Bugs Bunny prototype, as Sham-Fu the Magician's "Unnamed white rabbit"; Public Domain; with the Two Curious Puppies
III	Hare-um Scare-um	August 5	MM	Ben Hardaway and Cal Dalton	Blu-ray/DVD: Looney Tunes Platinum Collection: Volume 2	As "Bugs" Bunny" - given a re-design by Charles Thorson.; First use of Bugs Bunny's name in marketing and publicity
=== 1940 ===
IV	Elmer's Candid Camera	March 2	MM	Chuck Jones	DVD: Looney Tunes Golden Collection: Volume 1; DVD: The Essential Bugs Bunny; Blu-ray/DVD: Looney Tunes Platinum Collection: Volume 2; Blu-ray: Bugs Bunny 80th Anniversary Collection	As "Bugs Bunny", according to the copyright synopsis for this cartoon, but he wasn't officially named "Bugs" yet.; First appearance of Arthur Q. Bryan as the new voice actor for Elmer Fudd. And also, the ninth appearance of Elmer Fudd, but in a new design.
V	Patient Porky	August 24	LT	Bob Clampett	DVD: Looney Tunes Golden Collection: Volume 5 (restored); DVD: Porky Pig 101 (unrestored)	Cameo; Final appearance of the Bugs Bunny prototype; With Porky Pig

=== Officially as Bugs Bunny ===
Note: Every short before Buckaroo Bugs is part of the Merrie Melodies series.

=== 1940 ===
No.	Title	Original release date	Series	Directed by	Official DVD/Blu-ray Availability	Notes
1	A Wild Hare	July 27	MM	Tex Avery	DVD: Looney Tunes Golden Collection: Volume 3 (bonus feature - unrestored); DVD: Looney Tunes Golden Collection: Volume 4 (bonus feature - unrestored); DVD: Warner Bros. Home Entertainment Academy Awards Animation Collection (restored); DVD: The Essential Bugs Bunny (restored); Blu-ray/DVD: Looney Tunes Platinum Collection: Volume 2 (restored); Blu-ray: Bugs Bunny 80th Anniversary Collection (restored)	First official appearance as "Bugs Bunny"; First-time Bugs Bunny uses his iconic New York accent.; First-time Bugs utters the catchphrase "What's Up, Doc?"; Given another re-design by Bob Givens- appearing closer to his final design.; with Elmer Fudd; Academy Award-nominee for Best Short Subject (Cartoon); also used in the documentary film Bugs Bunny: Superstar
=== 1941 ===
2	Elmer's Pet Rabbit	January 4	MM	Chuck Jones	Blu-ray: Looney Tunes Collector's Choice: Volume 3	First appearance of Bugs Bunny's name on-screen; with Elmer Fudd
3	Tortoise Beats Hare	March 15	MM	Tex Avery	DVD: Looney Tunes Golden Collection: Volume 2; Blu-ray/DVD: Looney Tunes Platinum Collection: Volume 2	with Cecil Turtle (first of the "Tortoise and the Hare" Trilogy)
4	Hiawatha's Rabbit Hunt	June 7	MM	Friz Freleng	DVD: Warner Bros. Home Entertainment Academy Awards Animation Collection; Blu-ray/DVD: Looney Tunes Platinum Collection: Volume 3	with Hiawatha; Rarely shown due to Native American stereotyping.; Academy Award-nominee for Best Short Subject (Cartoon)
5	The Heckling Hare	July 5	MM	Tex Avery	DVD: Looney Tunes Golden Collection: Volume 2; Blu-ray: Looney Tunes Collector's Vault: Volume 2	with Willoughby the Dog
6	All This and Rabbit Stew	September 13	MM	Tex Avery (uncredited)	Currently Unavailable	Final cartoon directed by Tex Avery; Public Domain; Only Bugs Bunny cartoon to be a part of the "Censored Eleven". Permanently banned from television in 1969 due to racist depictions of African Americans. Has never been officially released on any home video format.
7	Wabbit Twouble	December 20	MM	Bob Clampett	DVD: Looney Tunes Golden Collection: Volume 1; Blu-ray/DVD: Looney Tunes Platinum Collection: Volume 2	with Elmer Fudd; First "Fat Elmer" cartoon
=== 1942 ===
8	The Wabbit Who Came to Supper	March 28	MM	Friz Freleng	DVD: Looney Tunes Golden Collection: Volume 3	Public Domain; with Elmer Fudd; Second "Fat Elmer" cartoon
9	The Wacky Wabbit	May 2	MM	Bob Clampett	DVD: Looney Tunes Golden Collection: Volume 5	Public Domain; with Elmer Fudd; Third "Fat Elmer" cartoon
10	Hold the Lion, Please	June 6	MM	Chuck Jones	Blu-ray: Bugs Bunny 80th Anniversary Collection	
11	Bugs Bunny Gets the Boid	July 11	MM	Bob Clampett	DVD: Looney Tunes Golden Collection: Volume 1; Blu-ray/DVD: Looney Tunes Platinum Collection: Volume 2; Blu-ray: Bugs Bunny 80th Anniversary Collection	with Beaky Buzzard
12	Fresh Hare	August 22	MM	Friz Freleng	DVD: Captains of the Clouds (Bonus Feature - Unrestored and Uncensored)	Public Domain; with Elmer Fudd; Fourth and final "Fat Elmer" cartoon - would revert to his original design in the following cartoon.; Clips of the restored print can be seen in the documentary bonus features of Looney Tunes Platinum Collection: Volume 2 and Bugs Bunny 80th Anniversary Collection. However, the restored version of the full cartoon has never been officially released on any home video format, most likely due to the blackface joke at the end.
13	The Hare-Brained Hypnotist	October 31	MM	Friz Freleng	DVD: Looney Tunes Golden Collection: Volume 2	with Elmer Fudd
14	Case of the Missing Hare	December 12	MM	Chuck Jones	DVD: Looney Tunes Golden Collection: Volume 3; Blu-ray: Looney Tunes Collector's Vault: Volume 3	Public Domain
=== 1943 ===
15	Tortoise Wins by a Hare	February 20	MM	Bob Clampett	DVD: Looney Tunes Golden Collection: Volume 1; Blu-ray/DVD: Looney Tunes Platinum Collection: Volume 2	with Cecil Turtle (Second entry in the "Tortoise and the Hare" Trilogy); First cartoon to feature Bugs Bunny's finalized design by Robert McKimson
16	Super-Rabbit	April 3	MM	Chuck Jones	DVD: Looney Tunes Golden Collection: Volume 3; Blu-ray: Bugs Bunny 80th Anniversary Collection	
17	Jack-Wabbit and the Beanstalk	June 12	MM	Friz Freleng	Blu-ray: Bugs Bunny 80th Anniversary Collection	
18	Wackiki Wabbit	July 3	MM	Chuck Jones	DVD: Looney Tunes Golden Collection: Volume 3	Public Domain
19	Porky Pig's Feat	July 17	LT	Frank Tashlin	DVD: Looney Tunes Golden Collection: Volume 3; DVD: Looney Tunes Platinum Collection: Volume 3; DVD: Porky Pig 101	Public Domain; First appearance with Daffy Duck; Only official appearance in a black-and-white Looney Tunes short
20	A Corny Concerto	September 25	MM	Bob Clampett	DVD: Looney Tunes Golden Collection: Volume 2; Blu-ray/DVD: Looney Tunes Platinum Collection: Volume 3	Public Domain; with Porky Pig, Elmer Fudd and Daffy Duck; also used in the documentary film Bugs Bunny: Superstar
21	Falling Hare	October 30	MM	Bob Clampett	DVD: Looney Tunes Golden Collection: Volume 3; Blu-ray/DVD: Looney Tunes Platinum Collection: Volume 3	Last Bugs Bunny cartoon in the Public Domain; as all subsequent shorts released remain copyrighted.
=== 1944 ===
22	Little Red Riding Rabbit	January 4	MM	Friz Freleng	DVD: Looney Tunes Golden Collection: Volume 2; Blu-ray/DVD: Looney Tunes Platinum Collection: Volume 3	With Red Riding Hood and B.B. Wolf
23	What's Cookin' Doc?	January 8	MM	Bob Clampett	DVD: Looney Tunes Golden Collection: Volume 4 (bonus feature - unrestored); DVD: Warner Bros. Home Entertainment Academy Awards Animation Collection (bonus feature - unrestored); Blu-ray: Bugs Bunny 80th Anniversary Collection (restored)	With Hiawatha; Re-uses footage from Hiawatha's Rabbit Hunt; also used in the documentary film Bugs Bunny: Superstar
24	Bugs Bunny and the Three Bears	February 26	MM	Chuck Jones	DVD: Looney Tunes Golden Collection: Volume 1; Blu-ray: Bugs Bunny 80th Anniversary Collection	with The Three Bears
25	Bugs Bunny Nips the Nips	April 22	MM	Friz Freleng	Currently Unavailable	Rarely seen due to racist depictions of Japanese People. Last officially released on Golden Age of Looney Tunes laserdisc set in 1991.
26	Hare Ribbin'	June 24	MM	Bob Clampett	DVD: Looney Tunes Golden Collection: Volume 5; Blu-ray: Bugs Bunny 80th Anniversary Collection	Two versions exist of this short a theatrical cut and a director's cut; with Russian Dog
27	Hare Force	July 22	MM	Friz Freleng	DVD: Looney Tunes Golden Collection: Volume 3	with Willoughby the Dog
28	Buckaroo Bugs	August 26	LT	Bob Clampett	DVD: Looney Tunes Golden Collection: Volume 5; Blu-ray/DVD: Looney Tunes Platinum Collection: Volume 2	with Red Hot Ryder; first Bugs Bunny cartoon in the Looney Tunes series
29	The Old Grey Hare	October 28	MM	Bob Clampett	DVD: Looney Tunes Golden Collection: Volume 4 (bonus feature - unrestored); DVD: Looney Tunes Golden Collection: Volume 5 (restored); DVD: The Essential Bugs Bunny (restored); Blu-ray/DVD: Looney Tunes Platinum Collection: Volume 1 (restored); Blu-ray: Bugs Bunny 80th Anniversary Collection (restored)	with Elmer Fudd; also used in the documentary film Bugs Bunny: Superstar
30	Stage Door Cartoon	December 30	MM	Friz Freleng	DVD: Looney Tunes Golden Collection: Volume 2; Blu-ray: Looney Tunes Collector's Vault: Volume 3	with Elmer Fudd
=== 1945 ===
31	Herr Meets Hare	January 13	MM	Friz Freleng	DVD: Looney Tunes Golden Collection: Volume 6; Blu-ray: Looney Tunes Collector's Vault: Volume 3	with caricatures of Hermann Göring and Adolf Hitler
32	The Unruly Hare	February 10	MM	Frank Tashlin	Blu-ray: Looney Tunes Collector's Choice: Volume 1	with Elmer Fudd
33	Hare Trigger	May 5	MM	Friz Freleng	DVD: Looney Tunes Golden Collection: Volume 6; Blu-ray: Looney Tunes Collector's Vault: Volume 1	First appearance of Yosemite Sam
34	Hare Conditioned	August 11	LT	Chuck Jones	DVD: Looney Tunes Golden Collection: Volume 2; Blu-ray: Looney Tunes Collector's Vault: Volume 1	
35	Hare Tonic	November 10	LT	Chuck Jones	DVD: Looney Tunes Golden Collection: Volume 3; Blu-ray/DVD: Looney Tunes Platinum Collection: Volume 1	with Elmer Fudd
=== 1946 ===
36	Baseball Bugs	February 2	LT	Friz Freleng	DVD: Looney Tunes Golden Collection: Volume 1; DVD: The Essential Bugs Bunny; Blu-ray/DVD: Looney Tunes Platinum Collection: Volume 1; Blu-ray: Bugs Bunny 80th Anniversary Collection	
37	Hare Remover	March 23	MM	Frank Tashlin (uncredited)	DVD: Looney Tunes Golden Collection: Volume 3; Blu-ray: Looney Tunes Collector's Vault: Volume 2	with Elmer Fudd; Final Bugs Bunny cartoon directed by Frank Tashlin
38	Hair-Raising Hare	May 25	MM	Chuck Jones	DVD: Looney Tunes Golden Collection: Volume 1; DVD: The Essential Bugs Bunny; Blu-ray/DVD: Looney Tunes Platinum Collection: Volume 3; Blu-ray: Bugs Bunny 80th Anniversary Collection	First appearance of Gossamer; also used in the documentary film Bugs Bunny: Superstar
39	Acrobatty Bunny	June 29	LT	Robert McKimson	DVD: Looney Tunes Golden Collection: Volume 3; Blu-ray/DVD: Looney Tunes Platinum Collection: Volume 3	First Bugs Bunny cartoon directed by Robert McKimson
40	Racketeer Rabbit	September 14	LT	Friz Freleng	Blu-ray: Bugs Bunny 80th Anniversary Collection	with Rocky and Mugsy prototypes
41	The Big Snooze	October 5	LT	Bob Clampett (uncredited)	DVD: Looney Tunes Golden Collection: Volume 2; Blu-ray/DVD: Looney Tunes Platinum Collection: Volume 3	with Elmer Fudd; Final Bugs Bunny cartoon directed by Bob Clampett
42	Rhapsody Rabbit	November 9	MM	Friz Freleng	DVD: Looney Tunes Golden Collection: Volume 2; Blu-ray: Looney Tunes Collector's Vault: Volume 1	also used in the documentary film Bugs Bunny: Superstar
=== 1947 ===
43	A Hare Grows in Manhattan	March 22	MM	Friz Freleng	DVD: Looney Tunes Golden Collection: Volume 3; Blu-ray/DVD: Looney Tunes Platinum Collection: Volume 3	with Hector the Bulldog
44	Rabbit Transit	May 10	LT	Friz Freleng	DVD: Looney Tunes Golden Collection: Volume 2; Blu-ray/DVD: Looney Tunes Platinum Collection: Volume 2	with Cecil Turtle (third and final short in the "Tortoise and the Hare" Trilogy)
45	Easter Yeggs	June 28	LT	Robert McKimson	DVD: Looney Tunes Golden Collection: Volume 3; Blu-ray/DVD: Looney Tunes Platinum Collection: Volume 3	with Elmer Fudd; has a similar title to the 1950 Daffy Duck short Golden Yeggs.
46	Slick Hare	November 1	MM	Friz Freleng	DVD: Looney Tunes Golden Collection: Volume 2; Blu-ray/DVD: Looney Tunes Platinum Collection: Volume 3	with Elmer Fudd
=== 1948 ===
47	Gorilla My Dreams	January 3	LT	Robert McKimson	DVD: Looney Tunes Golden Collection: Volume 2; Blu-ray/DVD: Looney Tunes Platinum Collection: Volume 3	with Gruesome Gorilla
48	A Feather in His Hare	February 7	LT	Chuck Jones	Blu-ray: Looney Tunes Collector's Vault: Volume 3	Never released on DVD due to Native American stereotyping. Prior to 2026, it was last officially released on the Golden Age of Looney Tunes laserdisc set in 1992.
49	Rabbit Punch	April 10	MM	Chuck Jones	DVD: Looney Tunes Golden Collection: Volume 3; Blu-ray: Looney Tunes Collector's Vault: Volume 1	First appearance of The Crusher
50	Buccaneer Bunny	May 8	LT	Friz Freleng	DVD: Looney Tunes Golden Collection: Volume 5; Blu-ray/DVD: Looney Tunes Platinum Collection: Volume 1	with Yosemite Sam
51	Bugs Bunny Rides Again	June 12	MM	Friz Freleng	DVD: Looney Tunes Golden Collection: Volume 2; Blu-ray: Bugs Bunny 80th Anniversary Collection	with Yosemite Sam
52	Haredevil Hare	July 24	LT	Chuck Jones	DVD: Looney Tunes Golden Collection: Volume 1; DVD: The Essential Bugs Bunny; Blu-ray/DVD: Looney Tunes Platinum Collection: Volume 1; Blu-ray: Bugs Bunny 80th Anniversary Collection	First appearance of Marvin the Martian
53	Hot Cross Bunny	August 21	MM	Robert McKimson	Blu-ray: Bugs Bunny 80th Anniversary Collection	
54	Hare Splitter	September 25	MM	Friz Freleng	Blu-ray: Bugs Bunny 80th Anniversary Collection	
55	A-Lad-In His Lamp	October 23	LT	Robert McKimson	Blu-ray: Looney Tunes Collector's Vault: Volume 2	
56	My Bunny Lies over the Sea	December 4	MM	Chuck Jones	DVD: Looney Tunes Golden Collection: Volume 1	with Angus Macrory
=== 1949 ===
57	Hare Do	January 15	MM	Friz Freleng	DVD: Looney Tunes Golden Collection: Volume 3	with Elmer Fudd
58	Mississippi Hare	February 26	LT	Chuck Jones	DVD: Looney Tunes Golden Collection: Volume 4; Blu-ray: Looney Tunes Collector's Vault: Volume 3	with Colonel Shuffle
59	Rebel Rabbit	April 9	MM	Robert McKimson	DVD: Looney Tunes Golden Collection: Volume 3	
60	High Diving Hare	April 30	LT	Friz Freleng	DVD: Looney Tunes Golden Collection: Volume 1; DVD/Blu-ray: Looney Tunes Platinum Collection: Volume 3	with Yosemite Sam
61	Bowery Bugs	June 4	MM	Arthur Davis	DVD: Looney Tunes Golden Collection: Volume 3; Blu-ray: Looney Tunes Collector's Vault: Volume 2	First and only Bugs Bunny cartoon directed by Arthur Davis.
62	Long-Haired Hare	June 25	LT	Chuck Jones	DVD: Looney Tunes Golden Collection: Volume 1; Blu-ray/DVD: Looney Tunes Platinum Collection: Volume 2	with Giovanni Jones
63	Knights Must Fall	July 16	MM	Friz Freleng	Blu-ray: Bugs Bunny 80th Anniversary Collection	
64	The Grey Hounded Hare	August 6	LT	Robert McKimson	DVD: Looney Tunes Golden Collection: Volume 4	
65	The Windblown Hare	August 27	LT	Robert McKimson	DVD: Looney Tunes Golden Collection: Volume 3; Blu-ray: Looney Tunes Collector's Vault: Volume 3	with B.B. Wolf
66	Frigid Hare	October 8	MM	Chuck Jones	DVD: Looney Tunes Golden Collection: Volume 1; Blu-ray: Looney Tunes Collector's Vault: Volume 2	First appearance of Playboy Penguin
67	Which Is Witch	December 3	LT	Friz Freleng	Currently Unavailable	Never released on any official home media format by Warner Home Video due to racial stereotyping of Indigenous Africans.
68	Rabbit Hood	December 24	MM	Chuck Jones	DVD: Looney Tunes Golden Collection: Volume 4; Blu-ray: Looney Tunes Platinum Collection: Volume 1	
=== 1950 ===
69	Hurdy-Gurdy Hare	January 21	MM	Robert McKimson	DVD: Looney Tunes Golden Collection: Volume 4	with Gruesome Gorilla
70	Mutiny on the Bunny	February 11	LT	Friz Freleng	DVD: Looney Tunes Super Stars' Bugs Bunny: Hare Extraordinaire; Blu-ray: Looney Tunes Collector's Vault: Volume 3	with Yosemite Sam
71	Homeless Hare	March 11	MM	Chuck Jones	DVD: Looney Tunes Golden Collection: Volume 3	
72	Big House Bunny	April 22	LT	Friz Freleng	DVD: Looney Tunes Golden Collection: Volume 1	with Yosemite Sam
73	What's Up Doc?	June 17	LT	Robert McKimson	DVD: Looney Tunes Golden Collection: Volume 1; Blu-ray: Bugs Bunny 80th Anniversary Collection	with Elmer Fudd
74	8 Ball Bunny	July 8	LT	Chuck Jones	DVD: Looney Tunes Golden Collection: Volume 4; Blu-ray/DVD: Looney Tunes Platinum Collection: Volume 2; Blu-ray: Bugs Bunny 80th Anniversary Collection	Second and final appearance with Playboy Penguin
75	Hillbilly Hare	August 12	MM	Robert McKimson	DVD: Looney Tunes Golden Collection: Volume 3; Blu-ray: Looney Tunes Platinum Collection: Volume 3	
76	Bunker Hill Bunny	September 23	MM	Friz Freleng	DVD: Looney Tunes Golden Collection: Volume 1	with Yosemite Sam
77	Bushy Hare	November 18	LT	Robert McKimson	DVD: Looney Tunes Super Stars' Bugs Bunny: Hare Extraordinaire	with Hippety Hopper
78	Rabbit of Seville	December 16	LT	Chuck Jones	DVD: Looney Tunes Golden Collection: Volume 1; DVD: The Essential Bugs Bunny; Blu-ray/DVD: Looney Tunes Platinum Collection: Volume 1; Blu-ray: Bugs Bunny 80th Anniversary Collection	with Elmer Fudd
=== 1951 ===
79	Hare We Go	January 6	MM	Robert McKimson	DVD: Looney Tunes Super Stars' Bugs Bunny: Hare Extraordinaire	
80	Rabbit Every Monday	February 10	LT	Friz Freleng	Blu-ray: Bugs Bunny 80th Anniversary Collection	with Yosemite Sam
81	Bunny Hugged	March 10	MM	Chuck Jones	DVD: Looney Tunes Golden Collection: Volume 2; Blu-ray/DVD: Looney Tunes Platinum Collection: Volume 3	Second and final appearance with The Crusher
82	The Fair-Haired Hare	April 14	LT	Friz Freleng	Blu-ray: Bugs Bunny 80th Anniversary Collection	with Yosemite Sam
83	Rabbit Fire	May 19	LT	Chuck Jones	DVD: Looney Tunes Golden Collection: Volume 1; DVD: The Essential Bugs Bunny; Blu-ray/DVD: Looney Tunes Platinum Collection: Volume 2; Blu-ray: Bugs Bunny 80th Anniversary Collection	with Elmer Fudd; First cartoon alongside Daffy Duck; First cartoon in the "Hunting" trilogy
84	French Rarebit	June 30	MM	Robert McKimson	DVD: Looney Tunes Golden Collection: Volume 2	
85	His Hare-Raising Tale	August 11	LT	Friz Freleng	Blu-ray: Bugs Bunny 80th Anniversary Collection	First appearance of Clyde Bunny; Utilizes footage from Baseball Bugs, Stage Door Cartoon, Rabbit Punch, Falling Hare and Haredevil Hare
86	Ballot Box Bunny	October 6	MM	Friz Freleng	DVD: Looney Tunes Golden Collection: Volume 1; Blu-ray: Looney Tunes Collector's Vault: Volume 3	with Yosemite Sam
87	Big Top Bunny	December 1	MM	Robert McKimson	DVD: Looney Tunes Golden Collection: Volume 1	with Bruno the Bear
=== 1952 ===
88	Operation: Rabbit	January 19	LT	Chuck Jones	DVD: Looney Tunes Golden Collection: Volume 4; Blu-ray/DVD: Looney Tunes Platinum Collection: Volume 3	First cartoon with Wile E. Coyote
89	Foxy by Proxy	February 23	MM	Friz Freleng	DVD: Looney Tunes Super Stars' Bugs Bunny: Hare Extraordinaire; Blu-ray: Looney Tunes Collector's Vault: Volume 3	Final appearance with Willoughby the Dog
90	14 Carrot Rabbit	March 15	LT	Friz Freleng	DVD: Looney Tunes Golden Collection: Volume 5	with Yosemite Sam
91	Water, Water Every Hare	April 19	LT	Chuck Jones	DVD: Looney Tunes Golden Collection: Volume 1	Second and final cartoon with Gossamer
92	The Hasty Hare	June 7	LT	Chuck Jones	Blu-ray/DVD: Looney Tunes Platinum Collection: Volume 1	with Marvin the Martian
93	Oily Hare	July 26	MM	Robert McKimson	DVD: Looney Tunes Golden Collection: Volume 5	
94	Rabbit Seasoning	September 20	MM	Chuck Jones	DVD: Looney Tunes Golden Collection: Volume 1; Blu-ray/DVD: Looney Tunes Platinum Collection: Volume 2	with Daffy Duck and Elmer Fudd; Second installment of the "Hunting" trilogy.
95	Rabbit's Kin	November 15	MM	Robert McKimson	DVD: Looney Tunes Golden Collection: Volume 1; Blu-ray: Looney Tunes Collector's Vault: Volume 3	First and only cartoon with Pete Puma
96	Hare Lift	December 20	LT	Friz Freleng	Blu-ray: Bugs Bunny 80th Anniversary Collection	with Yosemite Sam
=== 1953 ===
97	Forward March Hare	February 14	LT	Chuck Jones	DVD: Looney Tunes Golden Collection: Volume 4	
98	Duck Amuck	February 28	MM	Chuck Jones	DVD: Looney Tunes Golden Collection: Volume 1; DVD: The Essential Daffy Duck; Blu-ray/DVD: Looney Tunes Platinum Collection: Volume 1	with Daffy Duck; Cameo appearance at the end
99	Upswept Hare	March 14	MM	Robert McKimson	Blu-ray: Bugs Bunny 80th Anniversary Collection	with Elmer Fudd
100	Southern Fried Rabbit	May 2	LT	Friz Freleng	DVD: Looney Tunes Golden Collection: Volume 4	with Yosemite Sam
101	Hare Trimmed	June 20	MM	Friz Freleng	DVD: Looney Tunes Super Stars' Bugs Bunny: Hare Extraordinaire; Blu-ray: Looney Tunes Collector's Vault: Volume 1	with Yosemite Sam and Granny
102	Bully for Bugs	August 8	LT	Chuck Jones	DVD: Looney Tunes Golden Collection: Volume 1; Blu-ray/DVD: Looney Tunes Platinum Collection: Volume 3	
103	Lumber Jack-Rabbit	September 25	LT	Chuck Jones	DVD: Looney Tunes Super Stars' Bugs Bunny: Hare Extraordinaire (cropped to widescreen); Blu-ray: Bugs Bunny 80th Anniversary Collection (correct aspect ratio)	Advertised as a 3D film.
104	Duck! Rabbit, Duck!	October 3	MM	Chuck Jones	DVD: Looney Tunes Golden Collection: Volume 3; DVD/Blu-ray: Looney Tunes Platinum Collection: Volume 2	with Daffy Duck and Elmer Fudd; Third and final installment in the "Hunting" trilogy.
105	Robot Rabbit	December 12	LT	Friz Freleng	Blu-ray: Bugs Bunny 80th Anniversary Collection	with Elmer Fudd
=== 1954 ===
106	Captain Hareblower	January 16	MM	Friz Freleng	Blu-ray: Bugs Bunny 80th Anniversary Collection	with Yosemite Sam
107	Bugs and Thugs	March 13	LT	Friz Freleng	DVD: Looney Tunes Golden Collection: Volume 1; Blu-ray/DVD: Looney Tunes Platinum Collection: Volume 3	First "official" appearance of Rocky and Mugsy in a Bugs Bunny cartoon.
108	No Parking Hare	May 1	LT	Robert McKimson	Blu-ray: Bugs Bunny 80th Anniversary Collection	
109	Devil May Hare	June 19	LT	Robert McKimson	DVD: Looney Tunes Golden Collection: Volume 1; DVD/Blu-ray Looney Tunes Platinum Collection: Volume 1	First appearance of the Tasmanian Devil
110	Bewitched Bunny	July 24	LT	Chuck Jones	DVD: Looney Tunes Golden Collection: Volume 5; Blu-ray/DVD: Looney Tunes Platinum Collection: Volume 1	First appearance of Witch Hazel
111	Yankee Doodle Bugs	August 28	LT	Friz Freleng	Blu-ray: Bugs Bunny 80th Anniversary Collection	with Clyde Bunny
112	Baby Buggy Bunny	December 18	MM	Chuck Jones	DVD: Looney Tunes Golden Collection: Volume 2; Blu-ray: Bugs Bunny 80th Anniversary Collection	
=== 1955 ===
113	Beanstalk Bunny	February 12	MM	Chuck Jones	Blu-ray: Looney Tunes Collector's Choice: Volume 1	with Daffy Duck and Elmer Fudd
114	Sahara Hare	March 26	LT	Friz Freleng	DVD: Looney Tunes Golden Collection: Volume 4	with Yosemite Sam; First cartoon since Porky's Pig Feat where Bugs Bunny appears with Daffy Duck not directed by Chuck Jones although Daffy is only a cameo
115	Hare Brush	May 7	MM	Friz Freleng	Blu-ray: Bugs Bunny 80th Anniversary Collection	with Elmer Fudd
116	Rabbit Rampage	June 11	LT	Chuck Jones	DVD: Looney Tunes Golden Collection: Volume 6 (bonus feature - restored); Blu-ray: Looney Tunes Collector's Choice: Volume 2	cameo by Elmer Fudd
117	This Is a Life?	July 9	MM	Friz Freleng	DVD: Looney Tunes Super Stars' Daffy Duck: Frustrated Fowl (cropped to widescreen); Blu-ray: Bugs Bunny 80th Anniversary Collection (correct aspect ratio)	with Daffy Duck, Yosemite Sam, Elmer Fudd, and Granny; First time June Foray provides the voice of Granny.; Utilizes footage from A Hare Grows in Manhattan, Hare Do and Buccaneer Bunny.
118	Hyde and Hare	August 27	LT	Friz Freleng	DVD: Looney Tunes Golden Collection: Volume 2; Blu-ray: Looney Tunes Collector's Vault: Volume 2	
119	Knight-mare Hare	October 1	MM	Chuck Jones	DVD: Looney Tunes Golden Collection: Volume 4	
120	Roman Legion-Hare	November 12	LT	Friz Freleng	DVD: Looney Tunes Golden Collection: Volume 4	with Yosemite Sam
=== 1956 ===
121	Bugs' Bonnets	January 14	MM	Chuck Jones	DVD: Looney Tunes Golden Collection: Volume 5	with Elmer Fudd
122	Broom-Stick Bunny	February 25	LT	Chuck Jones	DVD: Looney Tunes Golden Collection: Volume 2; Blu-ray/DVD: Looney Tunes Platinum Collection: Volume 1	with Witch Hazel
123	Rabbitson Crusoe	April 28	LT	Friz Freleng	Blu-ray: Bugs Bunny 80th Anniversary Collection	with Yosemite Sam
124	Napoleon Bunny-Part	June 16	MM	Friz Freleng	DVD: Looney Tunes Super Stars' Bugs Bunny: Hare Extraordinaire (cropped to widescreen); Blu-ray: Bugs Bunny 80th Anniversary Collection (correct aspect ratio)	
125	Barbary Coast Bunny	July 21	LT	Chuck Jones	DVD: Looney Tunes Golden Collection: Volume 4; Blu-ray/DVD: Looney Tunes Platinum Collection: Volume 2	with Nasty Canasta
126	Half-Fare Hare	August 18	MM	Robert McKimson	Blu-ray: Bugs Bunny 80th Anniversary Collection	
127	A Star Is Bored	September 15	LT	Friz Freleng	DVD: Looney Tunes Golden Collection: Volume 5; DVD: The Essential Daffy Duck; Blu-ray: Looney Tunes Collector's Vault: Volume 3	with Daffy Duck, Yosemite Sam, and Elmer Fudd
128	Wideo Wabbit	October 27	MM	Robert McKimson	DVD: Looney Tunes Golden Collection: Volume 3	with Elmer Fudd
129	To Hare Is Human	December 15	MM	Chuck Jones	DVD: Looney Tunes Golden Collection: Volume 4	Second short with Wile E. Coyote
=== 1957 ===
130	Ali Baba Bunny	February 9	MM	Chuck Jones	DVD: Looney Tunes Golden Collection: Volume 5; DVD: The Essential Daffy Duck; Blu-ray/DVD: Looney Tunes Platinum Collection: Volume 2	with Daffy Duck
131	Bedevilled Rabbit	April 13	MM	Robert McKimson	DVD: Looney Tunes Super Stars' Bugs Bunny: Hare Extraordinaire (cropped to widescreen); Blu-ray/DVD: Looney Tunes Platinum Collection: Volume 1 (correct aspect ratio)	with the Tasmanian Devil
132	Piker's Peak	May 25	LT	Friz Freleng	Blu-ray: Bugs Bunny 80th Anniversary Collection	with Yosemite Sam
133	What's Opera, Doc?	July 6	MM	Chuck Jones	DVD: Looney Tunes Golden Collection: Volume 2; DVD: The Essential Bugs Bunny; Blu-ray/DVD: Looney Tunes Platinum Collection: Volume 1; Blu-ray: Bugs Bunny 80th Anniversary Collection	with Elmer Fudd; Inducted into the National Film Registry
134	Bugsy and Mugsy	August 31	LT	Friz Freleng	Blu-ray: Bugs Bunny 80th Anniversary Collection	with Rocky and Mugsy
135	Show Biz Bugs	November 2	LT	Friz Freleng	DVD: Looney Tunes Golden Collection: Volume 2; DVD: The Essential Bugs Bunny; Blu-ray/DVD: Looney Tunes Platinum Collection: Volume 2; Blu-ray: Bugs Bunny 80th Anniversary Collection	with Daffy Duck
136	Rabbit Romeo	December 14	MM	Robert McKimson	DVD: Looney Tunes Golden Collection: Volume 4	with Elmer Fudd
=== 1958 ===
137	Hare-Less Wolf	February 1	MM	Friz Freleng	Blu-ray: Bugs Bunny 80th Anniversary Collection	with Charles M. Wolf
138	Hare-Way to the Stars	March 29	LT	Chuck Jones	Blu-ray/DVD: Looney Tunes Platinum Collection: Volume 1	with Marvin the Martian
139	Now Hare This	May 31	LT	Robert McKimson	Blu-ray: Bugs Bunny 80th Anniversary Collection	with B. B. Wolf
140	Knighty Knight Bugs	August 23	LT	Friz Freleng	DVD: Looney Tunes Golden Collection: Volume 4; DVD: Warner Bros. Home Entertainment Academy Awards Animation Collection; DVD: The Essential Bugs Bunny; Blu-ray/DVD: Looney Tunes Platinum Collection: Volume 3; Blu-ray: Bugs Bunny 80th Anniversary Collection	with Yosemite Sam; Academy Award-winner for Best Short Subject (Cartoon)
141	Pre-Hysterical Hare	November 1	LT	Robert McKimson	Blu-ray: Looney Tunes Collector's Choice: Volume 3	with Elmer Fudd
=== 1959 ===
142	Baton Bunny	January 10	LT	Chuck Jones and Abe Levitow	DVD: Looney Tunes Golden Collection: Volume 1	Bugs does not speak in this short.
143	Hare-Abian Nights	February 28	MM	Ken Harris	Blu-ray: Bugs Bunny 80th Anniversary Collection	with Yosemite Sam; Only Bugs Bunny cartoon to be directed by Ken Harris; Re-uses footage from Bully for Bugs, Water, Water Every Hare, and Sahara Hare.
144	Apes of Wrath	April 18	MM	Friz Freleng	DVD: Looney Tunes Super Stars' Bugs Bunny: Hare Extraordinaire (cropped to widescreen)	Third and final appearance of Gruesome Gorilla.; Cameo appearance by Daffy Duck.
145	Backwoods Bunny	June 13	MM	Robert McKimson	Blu-ray: Bugs Bunny 80th Anniversary Collection	
146	Wild and Woolly Hare	August 1	LT	Friz Freleng	Blu-ray: Bugs Bunny 80th Anniversary Collection	with Yosemite Sam
147	Bonanza Bunny	September 5	MM	Robert McKimson	Blu-ray: Bugs Bunny 80th Anniversary Collection	with Blacque Jacque Shellacque
148	A Witch's Tangled Hare	October 31	LT	Abe Levitow	DVD/Blu-ray: Looney Tunes Platinum Collection: Volume 1	Final appearance with Witch Hazel
149	People Are Bunny	December 19	MM	Robert McKimson	DVD: Looney Tunes Super Stars' Daffy Duck: Frustrated Fowl (cropped to widescreen); Blu-ray: Bugs Bunny 80th Anniversary Collection (correct aspect ratio)	with Daffy Duck
=== 1960 ===
150	Horse Hare	February 13	LT	Friz Freleng	Blu-ray: Looney Tunes Collector's Vault: Volume 3	with Yosemite Sam; Rarely shown due to Native American stereotyping. Prior to 2026, it was last released on The Looney Tunes Video Show - Vol. 12 VHS in 1984.
151	Person to Bunny	April 1	MM	Friz Freleng	DVD: Looney Tunes Super Stars' Daffy Duck: Frustrated Fowl (cropped to widescreen); Blu-ray: Bugs Bunny 80th Anniversary Collection (correct aspect ratio)	with Daffy Duck and Elmer Fudd
152	Rabbit's Feat	June 4	LT	Chuck Jones	Blu-ray: Bugs Bunny 80th Anniversary Collection	Third cartoon with Wile E. Coyote
153	From Hare to Heir	September 3	MM	Friz Freleng	DVD: Looney Tunes Super Stars' Bugs Bunny: Hare Extraordinaire (cropped to widescreen); Blu-ray: Bugs Bunny 80th Anniversary Collection (correct aspect ratio)	with Yosemite Sam
154	Lighter Than Hare	December 17	MM	Friz Freleng	DVD: Looney Tunes Super Stars' Bugs Bunny: Hare Extraordinaire (cropped to widescreen); Blu-ray: Looney Tunes Collector's Choice: Volume 4 (bonus feature, correct aspect ratio)	with Yosemite Sam
=== 1961 ===
155	The Abominable Snow Rabbit	May 20	LT	Chuck Jones and Maurice Noble (co-director)	DVD: Looney Tunes Golden Collection: Volume 5	with Daffy Duck
156	Compressed Hare	July 29	MM	Chuck Jones and Maurice Noble (co-director)	Blu-ray: Bugs Bunny 80th Anniversary Collection	Fourth cartoon with Wile E. Coyote
157	Prince Violent	September 2	LT	Friz Freleng and Hawley Pratt (co-director)	Blu-ray: Bugs Bunny 80th Anniversary Collection	with Yosemite Sam; later renamed Prince Varmint for television broadcasts
=== 1962 ===
158	Wet Hare	January 20	LT	Robert McKimson	Blu-ray: Looney Tunes Collector's Choice: Volume 3	with Blacque Jacque Shellacque
159	Bill of Hare	June 9	MM	Robert McKimson	Blu-ray/DVD: Looney Tunes Platinum Collection: Volume 1	with the Tasmanian Devil
160	Shishkabugs	December 8	LT	Friz Freleng	Blu-ray: Bugs Bunny 80th Anniversary Collection	with Yosemite Sam
=== 1963 ===
161	Devil's Feud Cake	February 9	MM	Friz Freleng	Blu-ray: Looney Tunes Collector's Choice: Volume 4	with Yosemite Sam; Reuses footage from Hare Lift, Roman-Legion Hare and Sahara Hare
162	The Million Hare	April 6	LT	Robert McKimson	DVD: Looney Tunes Super Stars' Bugs Bunny: Hare Extraordinaire (cropped to widescreen); Blu-ray: Bugs Bunny 80th Anniversary Collection (correct aspect ratio)	with Daffy Duck
163	Hare-Breadth Hurry	June 8	LT	Chuck Jones and Maurice Noble (co-director)	Blu-ray: Looney Tunes Collector's Choice: Volume 2	Fifth and final appearance with Wile E. Coyote
164	The Unmentionables	September 7	MM	Friz Freleng	Blu-ray: Bugs Bunny 80th Anniversary Collection	Final appearance of Rocky and Mugsy
165	Mad as a Mars Hare	October 19	MM	Chuck Jones and Maurice Noble (co-director)	DVD: Looney Tunes Super Stars' Bugs Bunny: Hare Extraordinaire (cropped to widescreen); Blu-ray/DVD: Looney Tunes Platinum Collection: Volume 1 (correct aspect ratio)	Final appearance with Marvin the Martian
166	Transylvania 6-5000	November 30	MM	Chuck Jones and Maurice Noble (co-director)	DVD: Looney Tunes Golden Collection: Volume 5	with Count Blood Count; Final Bugs Bunny cartoon directed by Chuck Jones.
=== 1964 ===
167	Dumb Patrol	January 18	LT	Gerry Chiniquy	Blu-ray: Looney Tunes Collector's Choice: Volume 3	Final appearance with Yosemite Sam.; cameo by Porky Pig; Only Bugs Bunny cartoon to be directed by Gerry Chiniquy.
168	Dr. Devil and Mr. Hare	March 28	MM	Robert McKimson	DVD: Looney Tunes Super Stars' Bugs Bunny: Hare Extraordinaire (cropped to widescreen); Blu-ray/DVD: Looney Tunes Platinum Collection: Volume 1 (correct aspect ratio)	Final appearance with the Tasmanian Devil.
169	The Iceman Ducketh	May 16	LT	Phil Monroe and Maurice Noble (co-director)	DVD: Looney Tunes Super Stars' Daffy Duck: Frustrated Fowl (cropped to widescreen)	Final appearance with Daffy Duck.
170	False Hare	July 18	LT	Robert McKimson	DVD: Looney Tunes Super Stars' Bugs Bunny: Hare Extraordinaire (cropped to widescreen); Blu-ray: Bugs Bunny 80th Anniversary Collection (correct aspect ratio)	Final cartoon with B. B. Wolf.; cameo by Foghorn Leghorn; Final theatrical Bugs Bunny cartoon until 1991.

== Post-golden age media ==
=== Documentaries ===
- Bugs Bunny: Superstar (1975)
- Bugs & Daffy: The Wartime Cartoons (1989)
- Chuck Amuck: The Movie (1991)
- Chuck Jones – Extremes & Inbetweens: A Life in Animation (2000)

=== Compilation films ===
- The Bugs Bunny/Road Runner Movie (1979)
- The Looney Looney Looney Bugs Bunny Movie (1981)
- Bugs Bunny's 3rd Movie: 1001 Rabbit Tales (1982)
- Daffy Duck's Quackbusters (1988)

=== TV specials ===
- Bugs and Daffy's Carnival of the Animals (1976)
- Bugs Bunny's Easter Special (1977)
- Bugs Bunny in Space (1977)
- Bugs Bunny's Howl-oween Special (1977)
- How Bugs Bunny Won the West (1978)
- A Connecticut Rabbit in King Arthur's Court (1978)
- Bugs Bunny's Valentine (1979)
- The Bugs Bunny Mother's Day Special (1979)
- Bugs Bunny's Thanksgiving Diet (1979)
- Bugs Bunny's Looney Christmas Tales (1979)
- Bugs Bunny's Bustin' Out All Over (1980)
- The Bugs Bunny Mystery Special (1980)
- Bugs Bunny: All American Hero (1981)
- Bugs Bunny's Mad World of Television (1982)
- Bugs Bunny/Looney Tunes All-Star 50th Anniversary Special (1986)
- Bugs vs. Daffy: Battle of the Music Video Stars (1988)
- Bugs Bunny's Wild World of Sports (1989)
- Happy Birthday, Bugs!: 50 Looney Years (1990)
- Bugs Bunny's Overtures to Disaster (1991)
- Bugs Bunny's Lunar Tunes (1991)
- Bugs Bunny's Creature Features (1992)
- The 1st 13th Annual Fancy Anvil Awards Show Program Special: Live in Stereo (2002)

=== TV series ===
- The Bugs Bunny Show (1960–2000), compilation series
- Tiny Toon Adventures (1990–1995), voiced by Jeff Bergman and Greg Burson
- Baby Looney Tunes (2001–2006), voiced by Samuel Vincent
- The Looney Tunes Show (2011–2014), voiced by Jeff Bergman
- New Looney Tunes (2015–2020), voiced by Jeff Bergman
- Looney Tunes Cartoons (2020–2024), voiced by Eric Bauza
- Bugs Bunny Builders (2022), voiced by Eric Bauza
- Tiny Toons Looniversity (2023), voiced by Jeff Bergman

=== Shorts ===
- Box-Office Bunny (1990), voiced by Jeff Bergman (first theatrical Bugs Bunny cartoon since 1964)
- (Blooper) Bunny (Produced: 1991, Released: 1997), voiced by Jeff Bergman
- Yakety Yak, Take it Back (1991), voiced by Greg Burson (live-action/animated music video directed by Tim Newman and Michael Patterson, with Melba Moore as herself and the voice of Tibi the Take it Back Butterfly, Dr. John as himself and the voice of Yakety Yak, MC Skat Kat, and Fatz)
- Invasion of the Bunny Snatchers (1992), voiced by Jeff Bergman
- Carrotblanca (1995), voiced by Greg Burson
- From Hare to Eternity (1997), voiced by Greg Burson
- Hare and Loathing in Las Vegas (2004), voiced by Joe Alaskey
- Daffy Duck for President (2004), voiced by Joe Alaskey
- Daffy Season (2026); voiced by Jeff Bergman

=== Webtoons ===
- Toon Marooned (2001), voiced by Billy West
- The Matwix (2001), voiced by Billy West

=== WB Kids YouTube channel original series ===
- Looney Tunes Presents: Sports Made Simple (2024–2026), voiced by Eric Bauza
- Looney Tunes Presents: Sports Talk with Bugs Bunny (2024–2026), voiced by Eric Bauza
- Looney Tunes Gokko (2026)

=== Feature films ===
- Space Jam (1996), voiced by Billy West
- Looney Tunes: Back in Action (2003), voiced by Joe Alaskey
- Space Jam: A New Legacy (2021), voiced by Jeff Bergman
- Coyote vs. Acme (2026), voiced by Eric Bauza

=== Direct-to-video ===
- Quest for Camelot Sing-A-Longs (1998), voiced by Billy West
- Looney Tunes Sing-A-Longs (1998), voiced by Billy West
- Looney Tunes: Reality Check (2003), voiced by Billy West
- Looney Tunes: Stranger Than Fiction (2003), voiced by Billy West
- Baby Looney Tunes: Eggs-traordinary Adventure (2003), voiced by Samuel Vincent
- Bah, Humduck! A Looney Tunes Christmas (2006), voiced by Billy West
- Looney Tunes: Rabbits Run (2015), voiced by Jeff Bergman
- Teen Titans Go! See Space Jam (2021), voiced by Billy West via archive footage from Space Jam

=== Awards show segments ===
- 59th Academy Awards (1987), Animation for Bugs Bunny presenting the award for Best Animated Short
- 62nd Academy Awards (1990), Animation for Bugs Bunny presenting the award for Best Animated Short
- 67th Academy Awards (1995), Animation for Bugs Bunny and Daffy Duck presenting the award for Best Animated Short

== Other appearances ==
=== Shorts ===
- Bugs Bunny (1942), a 90-second animated propaganda film for World War II bonds featuring the song Any Bonds Today?; co-starring Porky Pig and Elmer Fudd
- Jasper Goes Hunting (1944), a Paramount Pictures Puppetoon by George Pal (a 23-second cameo)
- Gas (1944), a Private Snafu cartoon
- Three Brothers (1944), a Private Snafu cartoon
- A Political Cartoon (1974), an independent short film by Joe Adamson (cameo)
- Daffy's Rhapsody (2012), appears as a prop
- Daffy Season (2026)

=== Films ===
- Two Guys from Texas (1948), live-action film; Bugs appears briefly in an extended animated dream sequence involving Dennis Morgan and Jack Carson
- My Dream Is Yours (1949), live-action film; Bugs appears in a musical dream sequence alongside Doris Day and Jack Carson (with a cameo by Tweety)
- Daffy Duck's Fantastic Island (1983), compilation film
- Who Framed Roger Rabbit (1988), a Disney/Touchstone film; Bugs appears alongside Mickey Mouse for the first and, so far, only time
- Gremlins 2: The New Batch (1990), voiced by Jeff Bergman; appears with Daffy at the film's opening (Daffy and Porky also appear during the end credits). A significantly longer version of the Bugs & Daffy sequence is included in the deleted scenes section of the DVD.

=== TV specials ===
- Cartoon All-Stars to the Rescue (1990), voiced by Jeff Bergman
- The Earth Day Special (1990), voiced by Jeff Bergman

=== TV series ===
- Taz-Mania (1991; 1993), voiced by Greg Burson; episodes "A Devil of a Job" and "Wacky Wombat"
- Animaniacs (1993–1994; 1997), voiced by Greg Burson; episodes "Video Review", "The Warners 65th Anniversary Special" and "Back in Style"
- Histeria! (1998), voiced by Billy West; episodes "The Wild West", "The U.S. Civil War - Part II" and "Great Heroes of France"
- Animaniacs (2020), non-speaking appearances in segments "Suspended Animation (Part 2)", and "Suffagette City"

=== Direct-to-video ===
- Tiny Toon Adventures: How I Spent My Vacation (1992), no voice actor
- Tweety's High-Flying Adventure (2000), voiced by Joe Alaskey

== See also ==
- Looney Tunes and Merrie Melodies filmography
  - Looney Tunes and Merrie Melodies filmography (1930–1939)
  - Looney Tunes and Merrie Melodies filmography (1940–1949)
  - Looney Tunes and Merrie Melodies filmography (1950–1959)
  - Looney Tunes and Merrie Melodies filmography (1960–1969)
  - Looney Tunes and Merrie Melodies filmography (1970–present and miscellaneous)
