= Half-Fare Hare =

- Directed by: Robert McKimson
- Story by: Tedd Pierce
- Starring: Mel Blanc; Daws Butler (uncredited)
- Music by: Carl Stalling
- Animation by: George Grandpre; Russ Dyson; Keith Darling; Ted Bonnicksen
- Layouts by: Robert Gribbroek
- Backgrounds by: Richard H. Thomas
- Color process: Technicolor
- Production company: Warner Bros. Cartoons
- Distributed by: Warner Bros. Pictures; The Vitaphone Corporation
- Release date: August 18, 1956
- Running time: 6:37
- Language: English

Half-Fare Hare is a 1956 Warner Bros. Merrie Melodies cartoon directed by Robert McKimson. The short was released on August 18, 1956, and stars Bugs Bunny.

In the short, Bugs boards the Chattanooga Choo Choo and finds two hoboes who look and act like Ralph Kramden and Ed Norton from The Honeymooners TV show, who want to eat Bugs after being hungry for days.

== Summary ==
On a snowy winter day, a newspaper lands near a train station and at the same time, Bugs Bunny arrives and looks at the newspaper, saying that a local carrot crop froze, prompting rabbits to leave the state in droves. Despite that he doesn't have a drove (implying a motor vehicle), Bugs decides to hop on a train to Chattanooga (where a bumper carrot crop in Alabama is also reported to be on the paper's same page) and shouts, "C'mon, Chattanooga Choo-Choo!"

Bugs makes his way to a boxcar, where he finds two hoboes named Ralph and Ed, as they fantasize aloud about food, not having eaten for days. They quickly see Bugs as a means to this end and try several ways to trap him, with Bugs outsmarting them at every turn. The tramps finally get their just deserts when Bugs lures them to the catwalk atop the train cars right as they're approaching the tunnel, causing them to hit the tunnel entrance facefirst, thus foiling their plan and leaving them stranded. As Ed laughs off their mistake, Ralph balls up his fist and bellows in Ralph Kramden comedic fashion, "one of these days...one of these days!"

Bugs calls out a taunting good-bye, right before he himself falls to the same gag, only from behind. As he rises from the track, his head full of lumps, he breaks the fourth wall saying, "well, maybe I didn't get to Chattanooga, but I SURE did get a bumper crop! Ugh!"

== Music ==
The cartoon features the song Carolina in the Morning, rather than the more obvious choice Chattanooga Choo Choo; Carolina in the Morning's faster melodic rhythm and emphatic downbeats complement the timing of the action in the cartoon.

== Censorship ==
ABC censored the part where Norton offers to attend to Bugs' scarf and he hangs Bugs on a coat hanger with the scarf hanger and another scene where Norton is cooking Ralph in a pot, presumably because of the violent nature.

Preceded by Barbary Coast Bunny	Bugs Bunny Cartoons; 1956	Succeeded by A Star is Bored
