= Yosemite Sam filmography =

Yosemite Sam is an American animated cartoon character in the Looney Tunes and Merrie Melodies series by Warner Bros. The character appeared in dozens of cartoons from the 1940s to the 2000s.

== Golden Age appearances ==
Title	Release date	Occupation	Alias	Notes
Hare Trigger	May 5, 1945	Western Outlaw	Yosemite Sam	First appearance.
Along Came Daffy	June 14, 1947	Starving Hermit	N/A	First of two shorts to not co-star Sam with Bugs Bunny.; Only short for him to be paired with his black-haired twin.; One of three shorts to pair him with Daffy Duck.
Buccaneer Bunny	May 8, 1948	Pirate	Sea-Goin' Sam	
Bugs Bunny Rides Again	June 12, 1948	Western Outlaw	Yosemite Sam	
High Diving Hare	April 30, 1949	Cowboy	Yosemite Sam	
Mutiny on the Bunny	February 11, 1950	Sea Captain	Shanghai Sam	
Big House Bunny	April 22, 1950	Prison Officer	Sam Schultz	
Bunker Hill Bunny	September 23, 1950	British Soldier	Sam von Schmamm, the Hessian	
Rabbit Every Monday	February 10, 1951	Hunter	N/A	Last cartoon to portray Sam's mouth under his mustache. The change was made half-way through the cartoon.
The Fair-Haired Hare	April 14, 1951	Home Owner	Yosemite Sam	
Ballot Box Bunny	October 6, 1951	Candidate for Mayor	Yosemite Sam	
14 Carrot Rabbit	March 15, 1952	Prospector	Chilkoot Sam	
Hare Lift	December 20, 1952	Bank Robber	Yosemite Sam	
Southern Fried Rabbit	May 2, 1953	Confederate Soldier	Colonel Sam	Scenes that involves portrayals of ethnic stereotypes were cut in modern television broadcasts.
Hare Trimmed	June 20, 1953	Gold Digger	Yosemite Sam	Only short to co-star both Bugs and Sam with Granny.
Captain Hareblower	January 16, 1954	Pirate Captain	Sam the Pirate or Pirate Sam	
Sahara Hare	March 26, 1955	Sheikh	Riff Raff Sam	
This Is a Life?	July 9, 1955	Pirate (Flashback)	Yosemite Sam	One of three shorts to pair him with Daffy Duck.; First of two cartoons to pair Sam with Bugs, Daffy and Elmer Fudd.; A scene from Buccaneer Bunny was reused for this cartoon as a flashback.
Roman Legion-Hare	November 12, 1955	Captain of the Praetorian Guard	N/A	
Rabbitson Crusoe	April 28, 1956	Castaway	Yosemite Sam	
A Star Is Bored	September 15, 1956	Western Outlaw	Yosemite Sam	One of three shorts to pair him with Daffy Duck.; Second of two cartoons to pair Sam with Bugs, Daffy and Elmer Fudd.
Piker's Peak	May 25, 1957	Mountain Climber	N/A	A scene from this short is reused in Robert McKimson's Dog Tales.
Knighty Knight Bugs	August 23, 1958	The Black Knight	The Black Knight	First and only Bugs/Sam cartoon to win an Academy Award for Best Animated Short Film in 1958.
Hare-Abian Nights	February 28, 1959	Sultan; Sheikh (flashback)	Yosemite Sam	Only Yosemite Sam cartoon to not be directed by any member of the Friz Freleng unit.; Directed by Ken Harris of the Chuck Jones unit.; A scene from Sahara Hare was reused for this cartoon as a flashback.
Wild and Woolly Hare	August 1, 1959	Western Outlaw	Yosemite Sam	
Horse Hare	February 13, 1960	Indian Chief	Renegade Sam	Rarely airs today due to its negative caricatures of Native Americans.
From Hare to Heir	September 3, 1960	Grand Duke	Sam, Duke of Yosemite	The cartoon would be reused in the 1983 compilation film Daffy Duck's Movie: Fantastic Island as Sam's wish.
Lighter Than Hare	December 17, 1960	Alien	Yosemite Sam of Outer Space	
Prince Violent	September 2, 1961	Viking	Sam the Terrible	Re-titled to Prince Varmint for pre-2020 television broadcasts due to its intimidating title.
Honey's Money	September 1, 1962	Gold Digger	N/A	Second of two shorts to not co-star Sam with Bugs Bunny.; Only short to star Sam by himself.; Remake of His Bitter Half and Hare Trimmed.
Shishkabugs	December 8, 1962	Chef	N/A	Rare instance where Sam is portrayed as a victim rather than an instigator.; Shortest Bugs Bunny cartoon to be produced, with 5:05 of footage (not including opening and credits).
Devil's Feud Cake	February 9, 1963	Bank Robber Praetorian Captain; Sheikh	Yosemite Sam	Last Yosemite Sam cartoon directed by Friz Freleng during the Golden age of American Animation.; Reused scenes from Hare Lift, Roman Legion-Hare and Sahara Hare, with new music provided by Bill Lava.
Dumb Patrol	January 18, 1964	German Fighter Pilot	Baron Sam Von Shpamm	Directed by Gerry Chiniquy, using Freleng's unit.; Last cartoon to star Yosemite Sam during the Golden age of American Animation.
Pancho's Hideaway	October 24, 1964	N/A	N/A	Features a Mexican relative, Pancho Vanilla, who is designed much like his cousin Sam but has a different accent

== Post-Golden Age appearances ==
=== 1972 ===
- Daffy Duck and Porky Pig Meet the Groovie Goolies

=== 1978 ===
- Bugs Bunny in King Arthur's Court

=== 1979 ===
- Bugs Bunny's Christmas Carol (Friz Freleng's last Yosemite Sam cartoon overall)

=== 1980 ===
- The Bugs Bunny Mystery Special

=== 1981 ===
- The Looney Looney Looney Bugs Bunny Movie (movie)

=== 1982 ===
- Bugs Bunny's 3rd Movie: 1001 Rabbit Tales (movie)

=== 1983 ===
- Daffy Duck's Fantastic Island (movie)

=== 1988 ===
- Who Framed Roger Rabbit (movie)

=== 1990 ===
- Tiny Toon Adventures (TV series)

=== 1991 ===
- (Blooper) Bunny

=== 1992 ===
- Invasion of the Bunny Snatchers

=== 1994 ===
- The Warners 65th Anniversary Special (Animaniacs guest appearance)

=== 1995 ===
- Carrotblanca

=== 1996 ===
- Space Jam (movie)

=== 1997 ===
- From Hare to Eternity

=== 2000 ===
- Tweety's High-Flying Adventure (movie)

=== 2003 ===
- Looney Tunes: Back in Action (movie)

=== 2004 ===
- Hare and Loathing in Las Vegas

=== 2006 ===
- Bah, Humduck! A Looney Tunes Christmas (movie)

=== 2011 ===
- The Looney Tunes Show (TV series)

=== 2015 ===
- Looney Tunes: Rabbits Run (movie)
- New Looney Tunes (TV series)

=== 2020 ===
- Looney Tunes Cartoons (HBO Max)

=== 2021 ===
- Space Jam: A New Legacy (movie)

=== 2023 ===
- Tiny Toons Looniversity (TV series) (Cartoon Network / Max)

=== 2026 ===
- Daffy Season
