= Piker's Peak =

- Directed by: Friz Freleng
- Story by: Warren Foster
- Starring: Mel Blanc
- Edited by: Treg Brown
- Music by: Carl Stalling; Milt Franklyn
- Animation by: Gerry Chiniquy; Arthur Davis; Virgil Ross
- Layouts by: Hawley Pratt
- Color process: Technicolor
- Production company: Warner Bros. Cartoons
- Distributed by: Warner Bros. Pictures; The Vitaphone Corporation
- Release date: May 25, 1957
- Running time: 7 minutes
- Language: English

Piker's Peak is a 1957 Warner Bros. Looney Tunes animated short directed by Friz Freleng. The short was released on May 25, 1957, and stars Bugs Bunny and Yosemite Sam. The title is a pun on Pike's Peak, although that respected mountain summit is in North America rather than in Europe (a "piker" is a small-time gambler, in North American slang).

The film is a mountain film. It features a mountaineering competition about the first person able to climb an unconquered mountain peak in the Swiss Alps. The mountain featured is fictional, but its name is based on the Matterhorn.

== Plot ==
In the Swiss Alps, when the mayor (Note: who bears a resemblance, visual and vocal, to German-American character actor Sig Ruman) announces a competition with a prize of "50,000 kronkites" (Note: a pun on Walter Cronkite, and a reference to famed vaudeville comedians Smith & Dale's famous Dr. Kronkheit sketch. Krankheit, pronounced cronk-hite, means "sickness" in German.) to the one who can climb the Schmatterhorn (Note: a pun on the Matterhorn) first, Yosemite Sam quickly volunteers.

When he starts climbing, Bugs Bunny emerges from a rabbit hole on the mountain, hearing a band playing the send-off tune and a crowd cheering. He inquires about the sounds, to which Sam brags about his dare and the prize. Bugs decides he wants in, and climbs up the mountain an easier way than Sam. Realizing that Bugs now plans on winning, Sam tries to pull him back down ("Get down, ya long-eared mountain goat!") In the process, he causes Bugs to pull down a boulder, which chases Sam back down the mountain and flattens him.

Sam climbs back up and pretends to form a partnership with Bugs. He climbs up with a rope tied to him, and another rope tied to Bugs, which he throws up to Sam. Bugs then shouts his "What's up, doc?" catchphrase, to which Sam replies "Not what's up, what's down!" revealing that he has double-crossed Bugs, tied his rope to another boulder and is about to push it over. However, it turns out that the rope around the rock is also tied to Sam! Despite his attempts to free himself with a Swiss army knife, he is pulled to the bottom of the mountain with the rock. As he prepares to try again, the band and crowd also sound again.

Sam runs back up and struggles to climb over a ledge. Bugs "helps" him over it, but Sam ends up sliding back down the mountain (Music and crowd again).

Sam runs back up to a cliff, which Bugs is climbing up. Sam tries to push another boulder over the cliff, but as soon as he lets go, it rolls after him, chasing him off another cliff. When he lands, the impact causes the boulder to fall after him, crushing him through the ledge onto the ground below.

Sam catches Bugs under a pile of snow. Bugs attempts to warn him to be careful to prevent an avalanche. Sam attempts to use this to his advantage by shouting and shooting his pistol, hoping the avalanche will get rid of Bugs. Instead, all the snow falls on Sam. A St. Bernard pulls a frozen Sam out of the snow, makes and drinks a cocktail, then runs off hiccupping.

Sam chases Bugs all the way to the top of the mountain. Once Bugs states that they have reached the top, Sam pushes him off, then starts celebrating. However, it turns out that he is on top of the Eiffel Tower, and Bugs says "Well, as long as he's happy, why tell him?" The band (who is at the base of the tower) plays the same song one last time, continuously into the "That's all Folks!" end titles. (Note: This is one of the rare post-1937 Warner Bros. cartoons to have music from the cartoon playing past the iris-out or fade out through to the end card; this was common in MGM cartoons, but rare in Warner.)

== Soundtrack ==
- "Bad Swiss Band" (sendoff music). Written by Carl Stalling
- "When I'd Yoo-Hoo in the Valley (to My Lulu in the Hills)", uncredited. Written by Henry Russell and Murray Martin
- "Little Brown Jug", uncredited. Written by Joseph Winner
- "The Bartered Bride, Opening Chorus", uncredited. Written by Bedřich Smetana

== See also ==
- List of American films of 1957
- List of Bugs Bunny cartoons
- List of Yosemite Sam cartoons

== Notes ==
Preceded by Bedevilled Rabbit	Bugs Bunny Cartoons; 1957	Succeeded by What's Opera, Doc?
Preceded by A Star Is Bored	Yosemite Sam Cartoons; 1957	Succeeded by Knighty Knight Bugs
