= The Looney Looney Looney Bugs Bunny Movie =

1981 animated feature film directed by Friz Freleng

- Theatrical release poster
- Directed by: Friz Freleng
- Story by: John W. Dunn; David Detiege; Friz Freleng
- Based on: Bugs Bunny by Tex Avery; Chuck Jones; Bob Givens; Robert McKimson
- Produced by: Friz Freleng
- Starring: Mel Blanc; June Foray; Stan Freberg; Frank Welker; Frank Nelson
- Narrated by: Frank Welker (Note: (bridging sequences only)); Ralph James (Note: (archive sound))
- Edited by: Jim Champin
- Music by: Rob Walsh; Don McGinnis; Carl Stalling (Note: (musical director: classic cartoons)); Milt Franklyn (Note: (musical director/orchestrator: classic cartoons)); William Lava; Shorty Rogers (Note: (song composer and trumpeter: classic cartoons))
- Production company: Warner Bros. Animation
- Distributed by: Warner Bros.
- Release date: November 20, 1981
- Running time: 79 minutes
- Country: United States
- Language: English

The Looney Looney Looney Bugs Bunny Movie (credited onscreen as Friz Freleng's Looney Looney Looney Bugs Bunny Movie) is a 1981 American animated comedy package film with a compilation of classic Looney Tunes/Merrie Melodies Warner Bros. cartoon shorts and animated bridging sequences produced and directed by Friz Freleng, hosted by Bugs Bunny. The new footage was produced by Warner Bros. Animation. It was the second Looney Tunes/Merrie Melodies film with a compilation of classic cartoon comedy shorts produced by Warner Bros. Animation, the first being The Bugs Bunny/Road Runner Movie (1979).

== Plot ==
The animated comedy film starts with a showing of the 1958 Academy Award-winning Warner Bros. cartoon Knighty Knight Bugs before going into its film opening credits. This is followed up by Bugs Bunny narrating how cartoons like Looney Tunes and Merrie Melodies immediately replaced baggy-pants comedy, as well as showing cartoons featuring Sylvester, before he introduces us to "a warm-hearted humble little introvert called Yosemite Sam".

=== Act 1: Satan's Waitin' ===
In a nearly shot-for-shot remake of Devil's Feud Cake, Yosemite Sam courts Granny with evil intentions for the $50,000,000 she has inherited, but while they are discussing this, Bugs overhears his scheming and thwarts Sam under the guise of another suitor and later Granny herself. In the end, Sam dies after being crushed by a safe that Bugs drops on him and lands in Hell. Satan offers to give Sam another chance in life on the condition that he brings someone else back in his place. Sam agrees to this with Bugs specifically in mind. Being sent back as a Roman guard captain, an Arab, and in his usual cowboy guise, Sam attempts to kill Bugs in order to bring him to Hell. His attempts are unsuccessful, but when Satan offers him one more chance, Sam refuses, stating Satan should get the rabbit himself and decides to stay.

=== Act 2: The Unmentionables ===
Bugs Bunny explains about cops and robbers, as well as gangster films. In Act 2, there are three cartoons dedicated to the gangster characters, Rocky and Mugsy.

Immediately after becoming a police detective (with the codename "Elegant Mess"), Bugs is captured by Rocky and his gang, who try to drown him. Bugs promptly escapes that and then infiltrates Rocky's birthday party that night, disguised as a showgirl. Rocky soon sees through Bugs' disguise and, accompanied by Mugsy, chases him into a cereal factory, where Bugs traps the pair on the cereal manufacturing machine. Afterwards, he brings Rocky to court, but thanks to some manipulations and obfuscating legalese by Rocky's sleazy and unethical lawyer at his trial, the mobster is free to go.

Bugs has problems finding Rocky's new hideout until word breaks out of farmer Porky Pig's golden egg, which was apparently laid by Daffy Duck. Upon reading of this, Rocky and his men capture Daffy and demand him to lay a golden egg. He eventually does after Rocky shoots him in the head, and is then ordered to lay more to fill up their collection of egg cartons. Bugs and the police suddenly bust in and arrest Rocky's troop. But another law loophole sets Rocky free again.

Rocky then captures Tweety and holds him for ransom, and Bugs appoints Sylvester to find Tweety. Sure enough, the pussycat finds Tweety in Rocky's hideout. After several failed attempts by Sylvester to free Tweety, the police arrive and surround Rocky's hideout. When Sylvester ends up being hailed as a hero for having seemingly rescued Tweety, Bugs brings Rocky to justice, but is forced to go to jail with him and Mugsy (who was likely arrested too) because he lost the keys to his handcuffs.

=== Act 3: The Oswald Awards ===
In the third and final act, Bugs introduces the Oswald Awards, an award ceremony created by Friz for animated characters. He then hosts the ceremony himself, announcing the nominees - the Wolf from Three Little Bops, Sylvester & Tweety and himself. During Bugs' show, Daffy continually gripes about the fact that he has not been nominated. When Bugs wins the award, an infuriated Daffy challenges Bugs to a talent showdown. Bugs seems to have the audience's favor, but is puzzled when Daffy ultimately wins their applause by blowing himself up. Bugs gives the now-ghostly Daffy the award, with the duck responding, "It just goes to show you, you gotta kill yourself to win an Oswald in this town!" He then bows, but is shocked when the audience stops applauding, so he leaves in a huff. The only explanation is they only applauded because he is now dead.

=== Featured cartoons ===
The cartoons used to make the animated film include:

- Knighty Knight Bugs (introduction. Full short. Merrie Melodies intro music used instead of Looney Tunes music and red rings used instead of blue rings, no credits and end card removed)
- Hare Trimmed (ending is removed, act 1)
- Satan's Waitin' (brief snippet of Satanic bulldogs originally barking at Sylvester)
- Roman Legion-Hare (act 1, as part of Devil's Feud Cake, shortened)
- Devil's Feud Cake (act 1; Note: Uses the same premise of that short, but features a different Satan design/voice and new animation and dialogue; some scenes are re-used from Devil's Feud Cake such as when the lions pursue Sam to a cliff, with a river below. Faced with an awkward dilemma of falling to his death [again] or being eaten by the lions, Sam hastily jumps, hoping to land in the river, but is killed again and ends up back in Hell. Also used is the ending where Sam does say "I'm staying" and wickedly laughs dressed as the devil)
- Sahara Hare (act 1, as part of Devil's Feud Cake, shortened)
- Wild and Woolly Hare (act 1, opening and ending are removed)
- The Unmentionables (act 2, shortened)
- Golden Yeggs (act 2)
- Catty Cornered (act 2, shortened)
- Three Little Bops (act 3, shortened)
- Birds Anonymous (act 3, shortened)
- High Diving Hare (act 3, shortened)
- Show Biz Bugs (act 3)

Also, clips from Little Red Rodent Hood, Speedy Gonzales, and A Pizza Tweety-Pie can be seen in the introduction.

== Voice cast ==
- Mel Blanc – Bugs Bunny, Daffy Duck, Yosemite Sam, Porky Pig, Pepé Le Pew, Speedy Gonzales, Sylvester, Tweety, Rocky and Mugsy, King Arthur, Sir Osis of Liver, Sir Loin of Beef, Gerry the Idgit Dragon, Treasury Director, Judge, Cop # 1, Cop # 2, Clancy, Clarence, O'Hara, Cats in B.A (also classic cartoons)
- June Foray – Granny
- Bea Benaderet – Granny (classic cartoons)
- Stan Freberg – The Singing Narrator, Big Bad Wolf, Three Little Pigs (also classic cartoons)
- Ralph James – The Narrator (classic cartoons)
- Frank Nelson – Satan
- Frank Welker – Reporter Dog, Rocky's Lawyer, The Narrator (bridging sequences)

== Home media ==
The film was released on VHS in 1982 by WCI Home Video. The film was re-released on VHS on October 26, 1999, and on DVD in the USA on April 28, 2009, from Warner Home Video. Special features for the DVD release included three bonus animated shorts: Box-Office Bunny, From Hare to Eternity and Pullet Surprise.
