= Southern Fried Rabbit =

1953 film by Friz Freleng

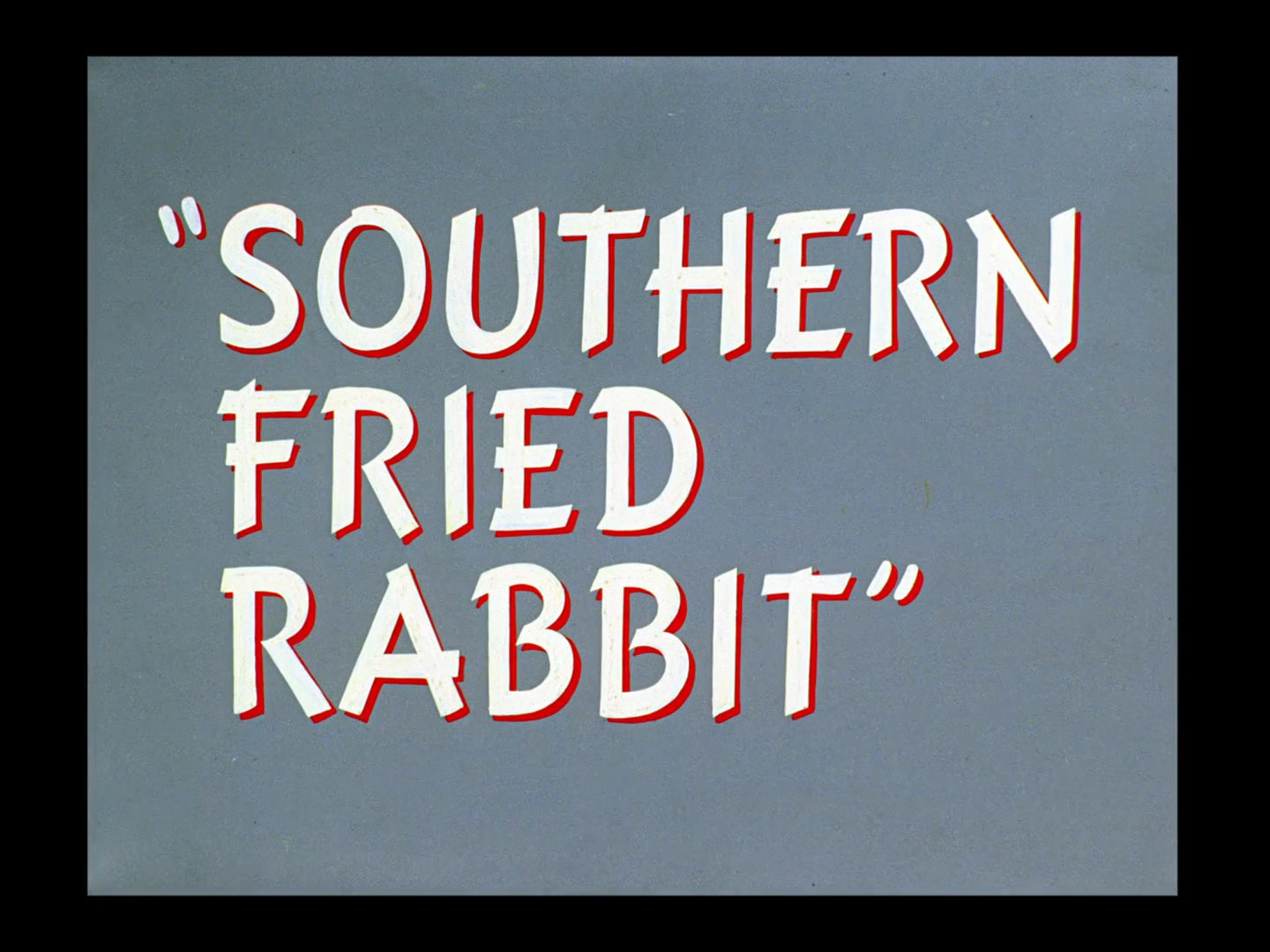
- Title card
- Directed by: I. Freleng
- Story by: Warren Foster
- Starring: Mel Blanc
- Music by: Carl W. Stalling
- Animation by: Ken Champin; Arthur Davis; Manuel Perez; Virgil Ross
- Layouts by: Hawley Pratt
- Backgrounds by: Irv Wyner
- Color process: Technicolor
- Production company: Warner Bros. Cartoons
- Distributed by: Warner Bros. Pictures
- Release date: May 2, 1953 (U.S.)
- Running time: 6:45
- Language: English

Southern Fried Rabbit is a 1953 Warner Bros. Looney Tunes cartoon directed by Friz Freleng. The cartoon was released on May 2, 1953, and stars Bugs Bunny and Yosemite Sam.

== Plot ==
Bugs Bunny hears of a record carrot crop in Alabama, prompting him to head South. At the Mason–Dixon line, he comes under fire from Yosemite Sam, who is wearing a Confederate uniform and claims to have orders from General Lee to stop any "Yankee" who tries to cross the border. Bugs points out that the Civil War ended almost 90 years ago, but his protests fall on deaf ears.

Bugs uses a series of disguises in order to fool Sam: first a banjo-playing slave, then Abraham Lincoln, then "Brickwall Jackson", then a Southern belle, and finally a wounded Confederate soldier. In the last guise, he tricks Sam into heading for Tennessee by telling him "the Yankees are in Chattanooga". The short ends with Sam brandishing his gun at the New York Yankees, who have come to Chattanooga for an exhibition game.

== Publication notes ==
The bit in which Bugs pretends that Sam is about to whip him (and then scolds him in the guise of Abraham Lincoln) was earlier used in the 1949 Daffy Duck-Elmer Fudd short Wise Quackers. Latterly, the short has been recut due to concerns about its use of racial humor.

== Home media ==
Southern Fried Rabbit was made available on VHS tape. A restored, uncut and uncensored version can be found on DVD in Looney Tunes Golden Collection: Volume 4.

== See also ==
- List of Bugs Bunny cartoons
- List of Yosemite Sam cartoons
- List of films featuring slavery

Preceded by Upswept Hare	Bugs Bunny Cartoons; 1953	Succeeded by Hare Trimmed
