= Horse Hare =

- Directed by: Friz Freleng
- Story by: Michael Maltese
- Starring: Mel Blanc
- Edited by: Treg Brown
- Music by: Milt Franklyn
- Animation by: Gerry Chiniquy; Virgil Ross; Arthur Davis
- Layouts by: Hawley Pratt
- Backgrounds by: Tom O'Loughlin
- Color process: Technicolor
- Production company: Warner Bros. Cartoons
- Distributed by: Warner Bros. Pictures
- Release date: February 13, 1960
- Running time: 6:35
- Language: English

Horse Hare is a 1960 Warner Bros. Looney Tunes cartoon directed by Friz Freleng. The short was released on February 13, 1960, and stars Bugs Bunny and Yosemite Sam. It was the first Bugs Bunny cartoon released in the 1960s.

The film is a Western comedy, where Bugs serves in the United States Cavalry, guards and defends Fort Lariat against Renegade Sam (Yosemite Sam) and his Indian American army.

== Plot ==
In 1886, Sergeant Bugs Bunny of the United States Cavalry receives orders to guard Fort Lariat while the cavalry goes on a special mission. Bugs patrols the fort, but a Indian army led by Renegade Sam wants to take over it. Sam orders an attack and the Indians charge, firing arrows. But when Bugs closes the gate behind him, Sam stops in his tracks and tries to stop the men from approaching, but they don't and he gets crushed against the door. Then Sam calls for Bugs to surrender, but the rabbit just shoots his opponent's hat off, to which Sam declares war and the Indians shoot. Simultaneously, Bugs uses tally marks to keep track of how many of the natives he has shot, singing Ten Little Indians – a similar gag was previously used in the 1953 Tweety and Sylvester short Tom Tom Tomcat, also directed by Friz Freleng; with the one difference that in this short, Bugs does not mark the tally accordingly, for at one point he marks half-a-tally after the fourth shot ("Uh-oh, sorry, that one was a half-breed").

One of the Indians tries to fire at the fort, but Bugs replaces one of his arrows with a stick of triggered dynamite, blasting the native, and causing Sam to decide to kill Bugs himself. Sam tries to fire his pistol, but it is stuck, though it still shoots bullets whenever Bugs is holding it towards Sam or when the latter is firing away from his enemy. After that, Sam orders his toughest, biggest but most dim-witted thug, Geronimo – who looks and sounds like Mugsy – to break into the fort's gate. Geronimo tries to use a giant tree tube as a battering ram, but he ends up squashing Sam. Soon after, Sam tries to arrow himself into the fort – when he flies down, he tries to shoot Bugs, who simply puts a wooden board in front of Sam so that the latter ends up sliding out of the fort.

When the tribal chief tries to shoot at the fort, Sam takes his gun and tells him to watch him shoot "one hare at a time". In a similar way to what happens with Daffy Duck in the 1950 short His Bitter Half (also directed by Freleng), when the Renegade fires his shot, Bugs, hiding behind rocks, fires a bullet via slingshot into the chief's head, prompting the chief to scold Sam. When the latter fires again, Bugs does the same thing and the chief threatens Sam by saying: "Look, ugly, 'plunk-em' me once more, and it's your last 'plunk-em'!" Suspicious that someone else is firing at them, Sam looks behind him, grins, fakes a shot and sees Bugs launch another bullet into the chief's head. But just when Sam points Bugs out, the chief violently punches Sam.

Later, at a Indian party, Sam spots Bugs spying on them. He orders another attack, but the cavalry comes to the rescue – and soon, both opposing armies are dangerously charging at each other, signaling an oncoming battle. While Bugs hides underground, Sam and his mule are unable to call off the attacks from both sides and get caught up in the middle. After the battle is over, Bugs looks up from his hole and sees nothing but scattered feathers.

Sam and his mule, both of whom have been trampled due to the battle, confront Bugs – with the same cramped voice that he used in Sahara Hare and Knighty Knight Bugs, Sam says: "I hate you!", while his mule adds to the Renegade: "And I hate you!". As the cartoon ends, Bugs remarks: "And me? I love everybody!"

== Voices ==
- Mel Blanc as Bugs Bunny / Yosemite Sam / Colonel (imitation of Frank Nelson) / Indian Chief / Geromino / Mule

== Controversy ==
This cartoon was one of twelve others that were pulled from Cartoon Network's 2001 "June Bugs" marathon, due to its negative caricatures of Indians as well as Bugs Bunny singing Ten Little Indians and using the offensive term "half-breed".

== Home media ==
The short is available on disc 1 of the Looney Tunes Collector's Vault: Volume 3 Blu-ray set.

== See also ==
- List of Bugs Bunny cartoons
- List of Yosemite Sam cartoons

Preceded by People Are Bunny	Bugs Bunny Cartoons; 1960	Succeeded by Person to Bunny
