= Sahara Hare =

1955 film by Friz Freleng

- Title card
- Directed by: I. Freleng
- Story by: Warren Foster
- Starring: Mel Blanc
- Music by: Milt Franklyn
- Animation by: Gerry Chiniquy; Ted Bonnicksen; Arthur Davis
- Layouts by: Hawley Pratt
- Backgrounds by: Irv Wyner
- Color process: Technicolor
- Production company: Warner Bros. Cartoons
- Distributed by: Warner Bros. Pictures; The Vitaphone Corporation
- Release date: March 26, 1955 (U.S.)
- Running time: 7:05
- Language: English

Sahara Hare is a 1955 Warner Bros. Looney Tunes theatrical cartoon short directed by Friz Freleng. The short was released on March 26, 1955, and stars Bugs Bunny and Yosemite Sam, with a cameo from Daffy Duck at the end.

== Plot ==
Bugs Bunny mistakenly believes he has reached Miami Beach in the Sahara Desert. Equipped with beach gear, he encounters Riff Raff Sam ("the riffiest riff who ever riffed a raft"), who mistakes Bugs for a trespasser and gives chase. Bugs outwits Sam at every turn, leading to comical confrontations. Eventually, Bugs traps Sam in a fort, where Sam faces a series of humiliating defeats.

In the end, Bugs sets a trap for Sam, causing an explosion. Daffy Duck then emerges from a hole, similarly mistaken about his location. Bugs lets Daffy discover the truth on his own.

== Production notes ==
Scenes from Sahara Hare were recycled in later Merrie Melodies cartoons like Hare-Abian Nights (1959) and Devil's Feud Cake (1963), as well as in "Act 1" of The Looney Looney Looney Bugs Bunny Movie (1981). Additionally, it introduced Milt Franklyn's rendition of "The Merry-Go-Round Broke Down", which remained in use until 1964.

== Home media ==
- VHS – Yosemite Sam: The Good, The Bad and The Ornery
- Laserdisc – Longitude and Looneytude: Globe-trotting Looney Tunes Favorites
- DVD – Looney Tunes Golden Collection: Volume 4

== See also ==
- List of American films of 1955
- List of Bugs Bunny cartoons
- List of Yosemite Sam cartoons
- Rif, a mainly mountainous region of northern Morocco

Preceded by Beanstalk Bunny	Bugs Bunny Cartoons; 1955	Succeeded by Hare Brush
