= Hare-Abian Nights =

1959 animated short film by Ken Harris

Hare-abian Nights
- Title card
- Directed by: Ken Harris
- Story by: Michael Maltese
- Starring: Mel Blanc
- Edited by: Treg Brown
- Music by: Milt Franklyn
- Animation by: Ken Harris; Ben Washam
- Layouts by: Samuel Armstrong
- Backgrounds by: Philip DeGuard
- Color process: Technicolor
- Production company: Warner Bros. Cartoons
- Distributed by: Warner Bros. Pictures; The Vitaphone Corporation
- Release date: February 28, 1959
- Running time: 6:58

Hare-abian Nights is a 1959 Warner Bros. Merrie Melodies cartoon directed by Ken Harris of Chuck Jones' unit, and animated by Harris and Ben Washam. The short was released on February 28, 1959, and stars Bugs Bunny and Yosemite Sam.

== Plot ==
In an Arabian palace, a band called Timbuk Two Plus 3 fails to impress the Sultan and ends up in a crocodile pit. An Elvis-like musician suffers the same fate. Bugs Bunny, having gotten lost on his way to Perth Amboy, is ordered to entertain the Sultan. Bugs recounts his adventures, including outsmarting a bull, a monster named Rudolph, and Yosemite Sam. It is later revealed that the Sultan is actually Yosemite Sam himself. Bugs tricks Sam into falling into the crocodile pit and escapes, mocking Sam's misfortune.

== See also ==
- List of Bugs Bunny cartoons
- List of Yosemite Sam cartoons

Preceded by Baton Bunny	Bugs Bunny Cartoons; 1959	Succeeded by Apes of Wrath
