= Willie Ito =

American animator (born 1934)

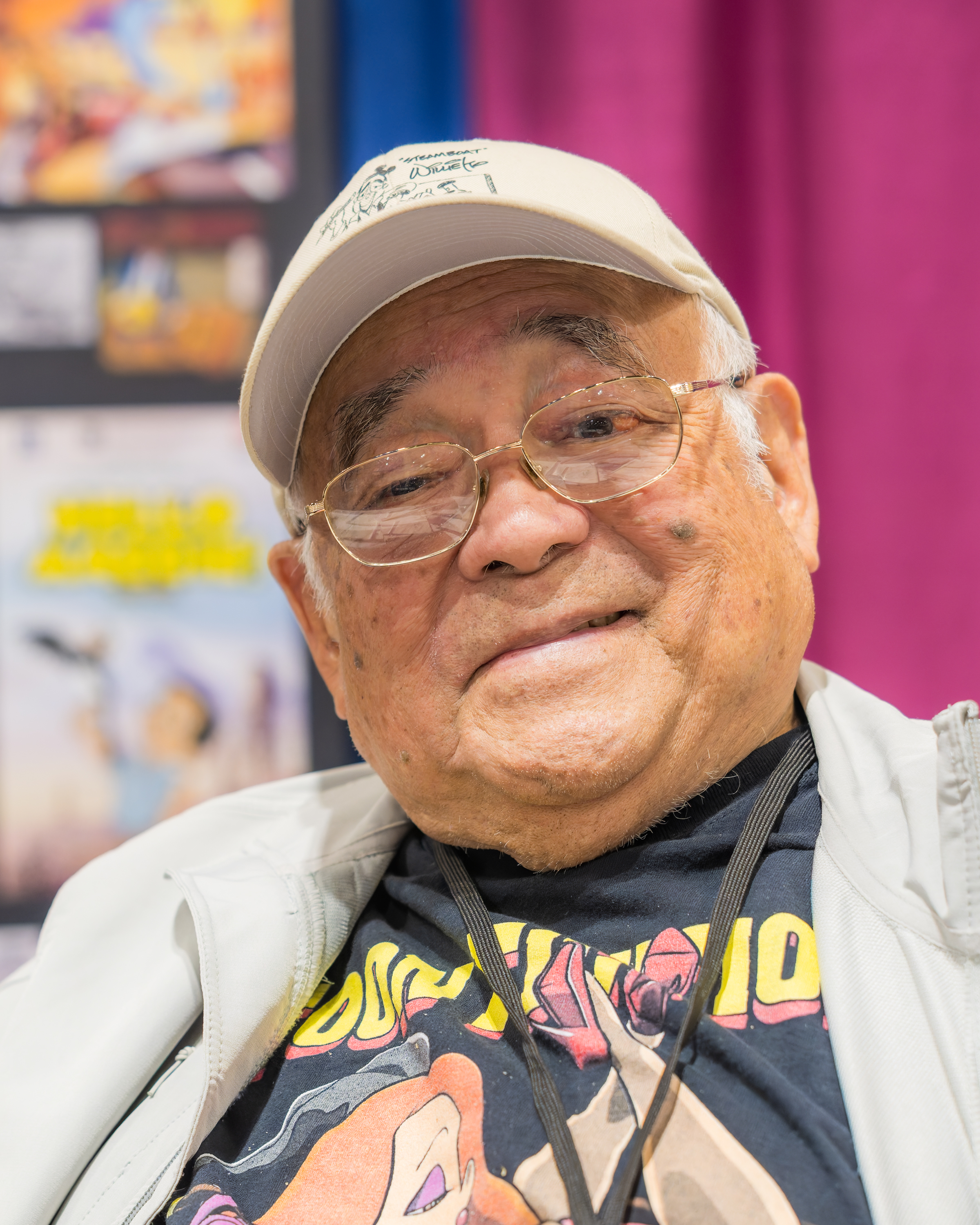
- Ito at Animate! Orlando in 2026
- Born: Willie Katsutoshi Ito Jr. July 17, 1934 (age 92); San Francisco, California, U.S
- Education: Chouinard Art Institute
- Years active: 1954–1999
- Employer(s): Walt Disney Productions (1954–1955, 1985); Warner Bros. Cartoons (1955–1958, 1961); Bob Clampett Productions/Snowball Productions (1959–1961); Hanna-Barbera (1963–1981, 1989); Sanrio (1978); The Walt Disney Company (1977–1999)
- Known for: Animation
- Notable work: Lady and the Tramp; What's Opera Doc? One Froggy Evening
- Children: 4

Willie Katsutoshi Ito Jr. (born July 17, 1934) is an American animator. He worked for Walt Disney Productions in the 1950s, moved to Warner Bros. Cartoons and Hanna-Barbera Productions as a character designer, and later returned to Disney.

In addition to animation, Ito has illustrated several children's books.

== Biography ==
Ito was born in San Francisco, California to Japanese immigrant parents. Seeing Snow White and the Seven Dwarfs in a cinema as a child inspired his love for animation.

Ito's family was incarcerated during World War II due to Executive Order 9066, first at the Tanforan Assembly Center, and later the Topaz War Relocation Center in Utah. Following his family's release from Topaz, Ito and his family returned to San Francisco. After completing high school, Ito began to pursue an art career, attending the Chouinard Art Institute in Los Angeles.

In 1954, Ito began working for Walt Disney Studios as an assistant to animator Iwao Takamoto on the film Lady and the Tramp. He later joined Warner Bros. Cartoons, where he worked with the animators Chuck Jones and Friz Freleng. According to Ito, Freleng borrowed him from the Chuck Jones unit, resulting in his first screen credit as a layout artist for Prince Violent.

In the 1960s, Ito moved to Hanna-Barbera Productions and continued working there for 14 years, contributing to shows including The Jetsons, The Flintstones, The Yogi Bear Show, and Josie and the Pussycats. Ito returned to Disney in 1977, where he worked in its consumer products division. His work consisted of designing Disney merchandise. Ito returned to the animation studio in 1985 for three months, working for The Wuzzles and Adventures of the Gummi Bears. He retired from animation on July 31, 1999.

In 2024, Ito announced his upcoming feature short animation film, Hello Maggie, based on the children's book he illustrated, Hello Maggie (2007), an account of his family's experience in the Japanese internment camps in the United States during World War II.

== Awards ==
- 2014: Inkpot Award
- 2021: Winsor McCay Award from the International Animated Film Society at the 48th annual Annie Awards, in recognition for his career accomplishments in the animation industry.
