= Hare Trimmed =

1953 film by Friz Freleng

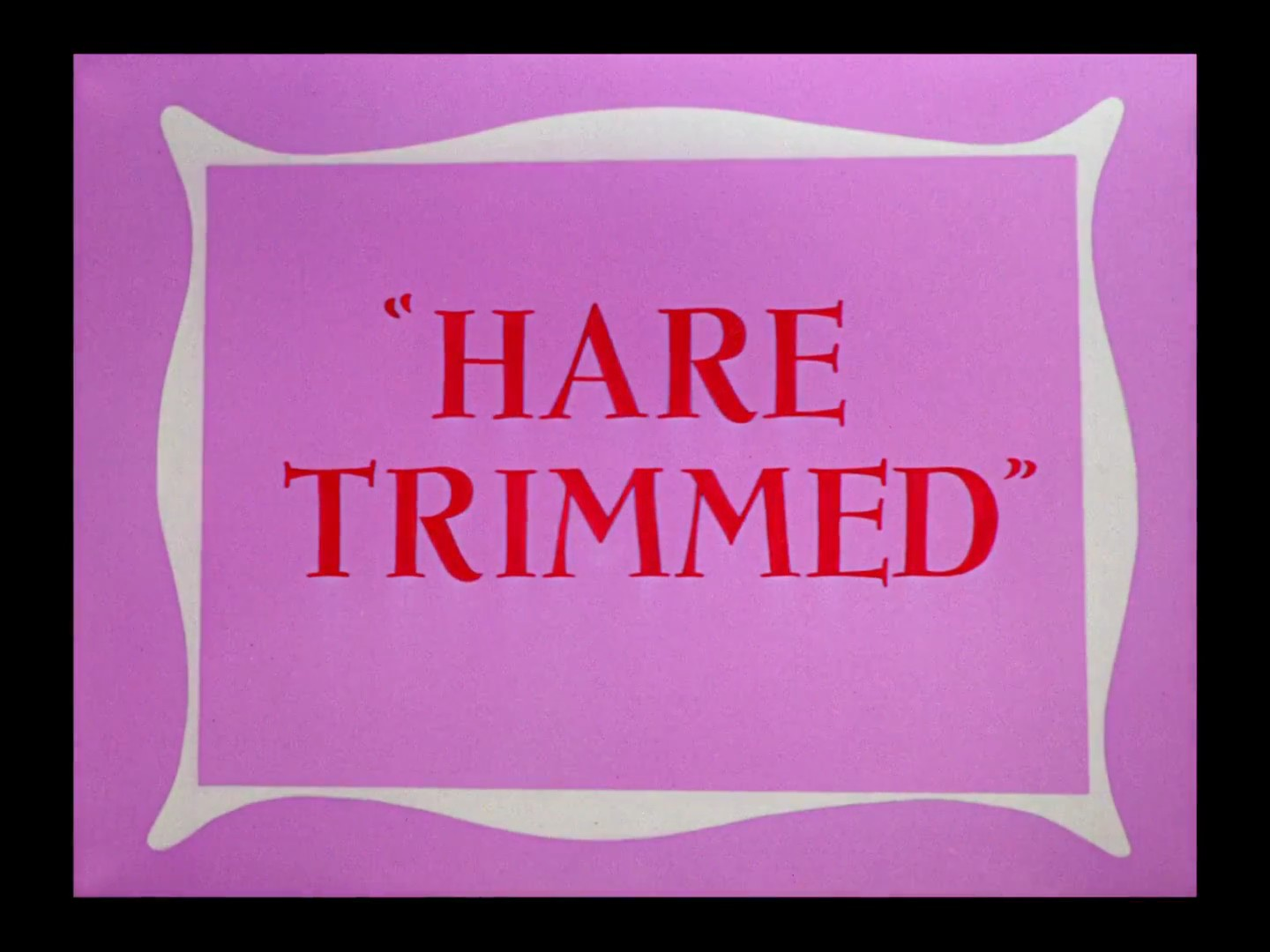
- Title card
- Directed by: Friz Freleng
- Story by: Warren Foster
- Starring: Mel Blanc; Bea Benaderet (uncredited)
- Music by: Carl Stalling
- Animation by: Manuel Perez; Ken Champin; Virgil Ross; Arthur Davis
- Layouts by: Hawley Pratt
- Backgrounds by: Irv Wyner
- Production company: Warner Bros. Cartoons
- Distributed by: Warner Bros. Pictures
- Release date: June 20, 1953
- Running time: 7 mins
- Language: English

Hare Trimmed is a 1953 Warner Bros. Merrie Melodies short directed by Friz Freleng and written by Warren Foster. The short was released on June 20, 1953, and features Bugs Bunny, Yosemite Sam and Granny.

== Plot ==
The story opens in a town called Doughnut Center (with a caption below that reads "What A Hole"). Sam learns from a newspaper that a local widow has just inherited US$50 million. Sam plots to marry the widow to take the money: once he has it, he will take everything else, house and all, from the widow, close the orphanage, and get rid of the police department. Bugs overhears him and plots to foil the plan by posing as a rival French suitor.

The widow, Granny, is excited to have two suitors, but Sam is not. Challenging Bugs by throwing down a gauntlet, he slaps him with a glove; Bugs slaps him with a brick-filled glove, then challenges Sam to a shooting round at ten paces. Sam accepts and they go out into the front yard to do it. With Sam the only one who has a pistol, Bugs times the steps. However, after counting out the ninth step, instead of counting out the tenth one, he says the halves and quarters of nine, and then the numbers and their halves and quarters that come after ten. Sam absentmindedly follows them, walking out into the street, and when Bugs does count out the tenth step, Sam turns to fire...and is run over by a bus, with Bugs pleased that it was on schedule, so he could have it run Sam over when it did. Bugs then poses as the widow, teasing him and pushing a piano down the stairs over him. The real widow arrives and offers the dazed Sam a cup of black coffee. While Sam is waiting, Bugs returns disguised again and asks whether Sam wants one lump or two (of sugar). Sam replies two and receives two blows from a mallet.

Bugs runs off before the real widow returns with Sam's coffee, and Sam violently kicks the cup with rage after she asks the same question, causing her to gasp in fear, "He's flipped his lid!" and hide in an upstairs room as Sam realizes what he has just done and tries to apologize to her, but to no avail: she shoots Sam when he peeps through the keyhole, and again when he tries to enter via the transom. Outside the room, Bugs (still disguised) whistles at him. Again thinking Bugs to be the widow, Sam apologizes and accepts the two lumps, receiving two more mallet blows and claiming he likes them. After Bugs suggests they elope, he begins throwing things he wants them to take with down to Sam via the second story window. Bugs throws so many household items down to Sam that he says, "That dame's takin' everything but the kitchen sink!" which is then promptly thrown down to him as well, much to his surprised disbelief. The last to go is the safe, dazing Sam when it is dropped on his head with so much force, he ends up inside the safe, after which Bugs opens the safe door, and they go to get married.

At the church, Bugs' gown bottom catches on a floor nail and is ripped off, revealing Bugs' cotton tail, and when Sam sees it, he refuses to marry Bugs, running off. Bugs mock cries: "Boo-hoo-hoo! Always a bridesmaid but never a bride. Boo-hoo-hoo-hoo!"

== See also ==
- List of Bugs Bunny cartoons
- List of Yosemite Sam cartoons
