= A Star Is Bored =

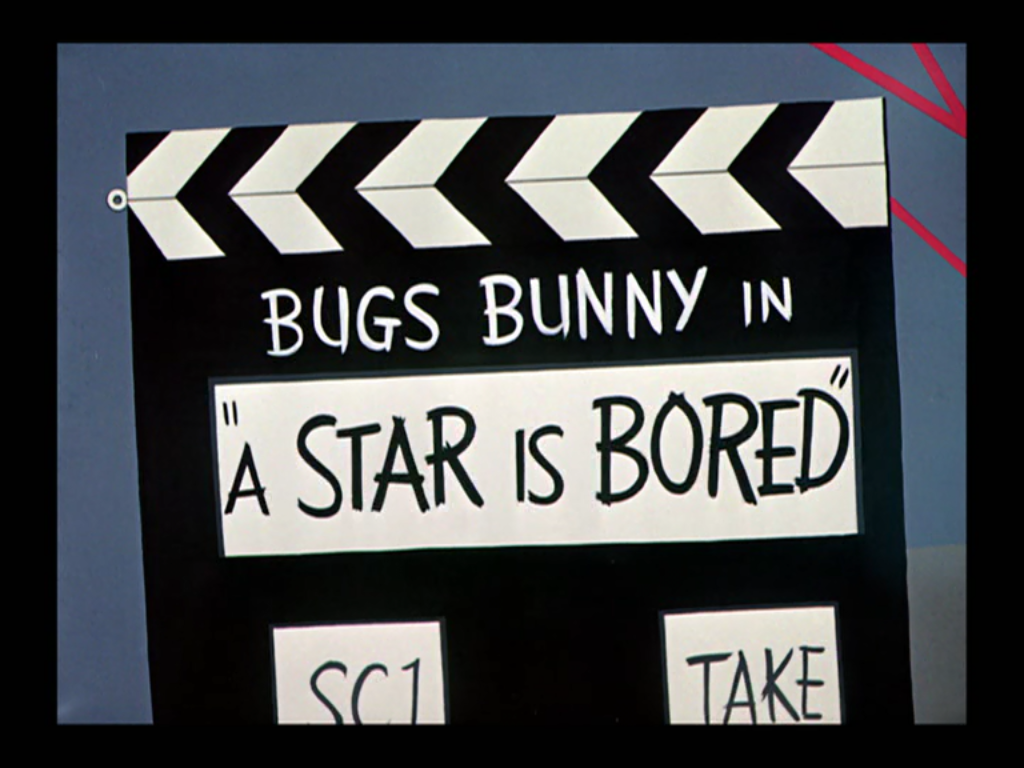
- Title card
- Directed by: Friz Freleng
- Story by: Warren Foster
- Starring: Mel Blanc; June Foray (uncredited); Arthur Q. Bryan (uncredited)
- Edited by: Treg Brown
- Music by: Milt Franklyn
- Animation by: Arthur Davis; Virgil Ross; Gerry Chiniquy
- Layouts by: Hawley Pratt
- Backgrounds by: Irv Wyner
- Color process: Technicolor
- Production company: Warner Bros. Cartoons
- Distributed by: Warner Bros. Pictures; The Vitaphone Corporation
- Release date: September 15, 1956
- Running time: 7 minutes
- Country: United States
- Language: English

A Star Is Bored is a 1956 Warner Bros. Looney Tunes cartoon, directed by Friz Freleng. The short was released on September 15, 1956, and stars Bugs Bunny and Daffy Duck. The cartoon expands upon the rivalry depicted between Bugs and Daffy, in such films as Chuck Jones' 1951 short Rabbit Fire, this time placing the action in a show-biz setting. In this 7-minute short, Daffy must double for Bugs in any slapstick that Warners deems too dangerous for its top star. After each disaster, Daffy shouts "MAKEUP!". The director directing the scenes has an Erich Von Stroheim accent.

This is one of the only four Warner Bros. shorts (the others being This Is a Life?, Invasion of the Bunny Snatchers, and [Blooper] Bunny) in which Bugs is paired with each of his three main antagonists (Daffy, Elmer Fudd, and Yosemite Sam).

The title is a play on the film A Star Is Born.

== Plot ==
The film starts with Bugs at his dressing room, where he is talking to the journalist Lolly (a reference to the nickname of Hollywood columnist Louella Parsons). Outside, Daffy is sweeping the floor, complaining about the job he got. Fed up with Bugs' success as a movie star, Daffy decides to become one.

To that end, Daffy marches into the casting director's (possibly Jack L. Warner's) office just as he is on the phone with another executive discussing the difficulty in hiring a stunt double for Bugs in his next picture. Daffy decides to enlist himself for the job.

After a visit to the Make-Up Department, Daffy gets his first taste of on-the-set film action shortly thereafter (a Western co-starring Yosemite Sam). Initially, Daffy is extremely excited to be finally in any motion picture ("I could be sent to prison for the scenes I'm gonna steal!", he snickers). He takes Bugs' place in a rabbit costume, holding a carrot, and stands next to Sam, who blows Daffy's beak off with his guns.

Next, Bugs is in a scene where he is high in a tree and Elmer Fudd is supposed to climb it to saw the branch Bugs is sitting on, off (though not all the way through, as Bugs reminds him). However, Daffy has other ideas as he knocks out Elmer and takes his clothes. Daffy tries to upstage Bugs by sawing off the branch Bugs is on; unfortunately for Daffy, the branch Bugs stands on is solid, while the part Daffy stands on falls to the ground.

In the next scene, Bugs is set to fish off a pier, but despite Bugs' advice to let him do the scene, Daffy insists on taking his place at the end of the pier and his fishing rod. However, a giant bluefin tuna swallows Daffy whole before the latter frees himself.

Another scene cuts to Bugs being chased by Elmer, just as Bugs dives into another tree. Elmer aims his gun into the tree, but gets poked in the rear by the gun's barrel (in reality, it is really Bugs holding another gun). When Elmer pulls his gun back, the other one makes the same movements. Daffy shoves Elmer out of the scene, and sticks the gun into the hole in the tree in which Bugs is hiding, but what he believes to be another gun (in reality it is his gun bent around so that it points at his hindquarters) sticks up through a hole in the ground just behind him. Daffy does an experiment by tying a red ribbon around the barrel of his gun, then sticks it into the tree, and looks behind him. The ribbon on the gun in the ground is white with red polka dots, leading Daffy to believe it to be a fake. He shoots, intending to mark Bugs, but the bent-around gun plan is revealed when the bullet hits him in the hindquarters and he pulls the gun out of the tree, having the white ribbon with red polka dots. Daffy then realized that Bugs had switched the ribbons to fool him, but Daffy still has his tail feathers shot leaving him frustrated.

The next scene has Bugs piloting a plane accelerating up to 20,000 feet (6,096 meters), then going uncontrollably in the direction of the ground. At the last second, the plane is "stopped" before crashing and Bugs get out and his place gets taken by Daffy, who gets caught in the plane's destruction before leaving off in a huff.

Fed up with his job, Daffy furiously announces to the casting director that he will no longer serve as Bugs' stunt double anymore. To pacify Daffy's rage, the casting director happily reveals he has a script for a new movie called The Duck in which Daffy himself can star in. Delighted, Daffy takes the script and reads it while leaving.

The final scene shows the filming of The Duck, with Daffy starring as a typical duck in a peaceful pond and directed by the same man who helmed the earlier movie for Bugs. Just as in the first scene of the earlier film, Daffy memorizes his lines for the pond scene by asking where the hunters are. However, Daffy did not expect for ten actors (posing as hunters) to actually shoot him with bullets, so he angrily demands to know the identity of the screenwriter who wrote the script. The screenwriter turns out to be none other than Bugs, who says to the audience, "I'd love to tell him, but, uh... hehehehe... modesty forbids."

== Cast ==
- Mel Blanc as Bugs Bunny, Daffy Duck, Yosemite Sam, Director (voice)
- Arthur Q. Bryan as Elmer Fudd (voice) (uncredited)
- June Foray as Lolly (voice) (uncredited)

== Home media ==
A Star Is Bored is available on the 2007 four-disc DVD box set Looney Tunes Golden Collection: Volume 5, as well as the similar, two-disc DVD Looney Tunes Spotlight Collection: Volume 5. It is also available as a bonus on the PlayStation 2 version of Looney Tunes: Back in Action, and the "Daffy Duck's Madcap Mania" VHS. The short is also available on the 2011 two-disc DVD The Essential Daffy Duck, and on the 2026 two-disc Blu-ray Looney Tunes Collector's Vault: Volume 3.

== See also ==
- List of American films of 1956
- List of Bugs Bunny cartoons
- List of Daffy Duck cartoons
- List of Yosemite Sam cartoons
