= Devil's Feud Cake =

1962 Merrie Melodies animated short

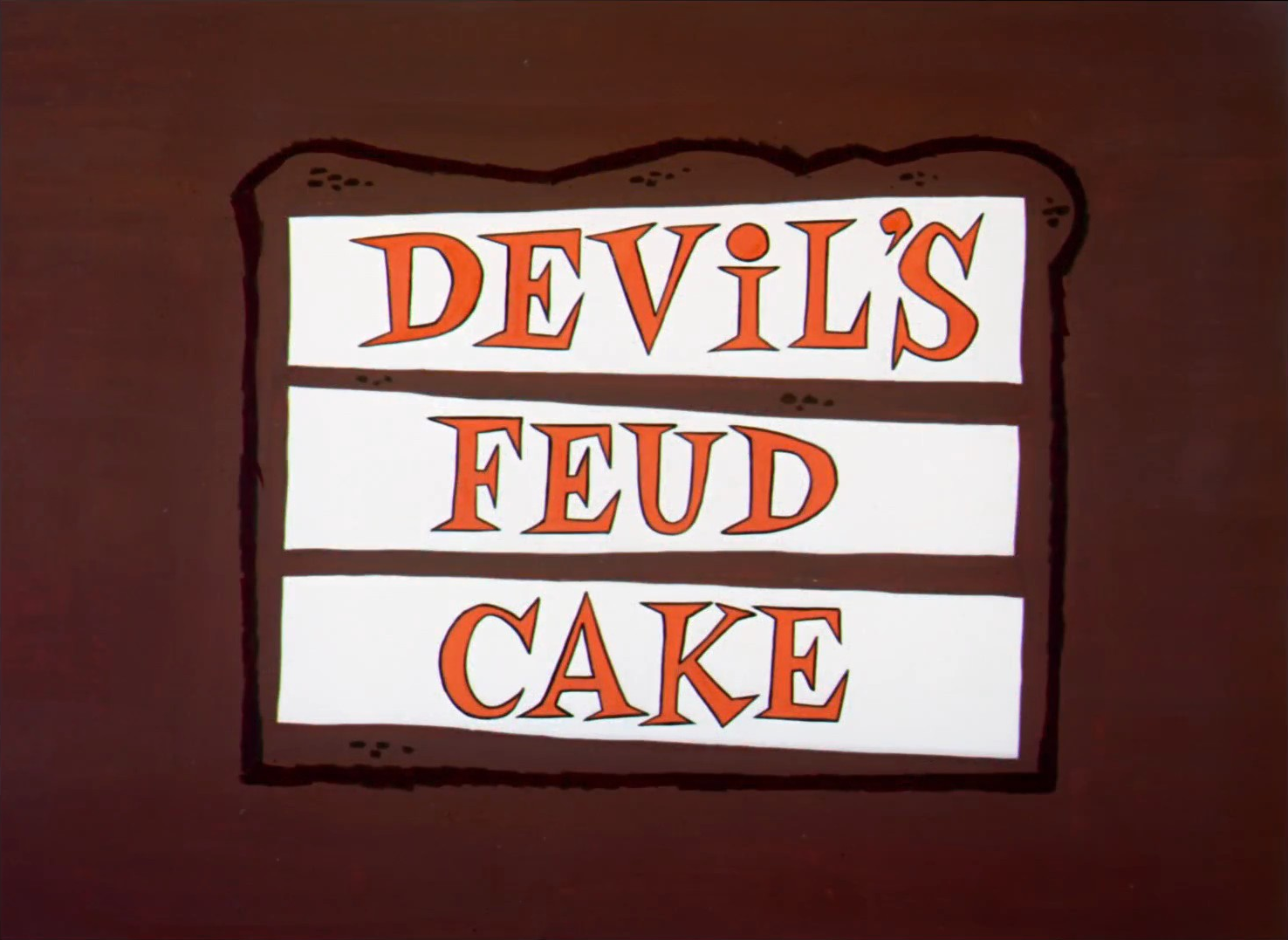
- Title card
- Directed by: Friz Freleng
- Story by: Friz Freleng; Warren Foster
- Starring: Mel Blanc; Jerry Hausner
- Edited by: Treg Brown
- Music by: Bill Lava
- Animation by: Gerry Chiniquy; Virgil Ross; Bob Matz; Art Leonardi; Lee Halpern
- Layouts by: Hawley Pratt
- Backgrounds by: Tom O'Loughlin; Irv Wyner
- Color process: Technicolor
- Production company: Warner Bros. Cartoons
- Distributed by: Warner Bros. Pictures; The Vitaphone Corporation
- Release date: February 9, 1963
- Running time: 7:40

Devil's Feud Cake is a 1963 Warner Bros. Merrie Melodies animated short directed by Friz Freleng. The short was released on February 9, 1963, and stars Bugs Bunny and Yosemite Sam.

The film involves the traditional cultural motif of making a deal with the Devil. Sam is depicted as a bank robber who was killed in an aviation accident while trying to escape. The Devil offers him freedom and a resurrection, but only if Sam can bring Bugs to hell.

== Plot ==
Yosemite Sam robs the Last National Bank and makes his getaway in an airplane flown by Bugs Bunny. Sam falls out of the plane and dies. Sam ends up in Hell, where he makes a deal with the Devil. If Sam brings Bugs (whom the Devil is after as well) to Hell, he will be set free, but if he fails, he will remain in Hell forever. Sam gladly accepts the deal and the Head Devil sends him back to the world of the living.

After three failed attempts on Bugs' life, the Devil decides to give Sam "one more chance". However, Sam has had enough and tells the Devil that if he wants Bugs, he can get him himself and announces that he is staying in Hell while wearing a devil suit and wielding a trident.

== Home media ==
This short is available on the Looney Tunes Collector's Choice: Volume 4 Blu-ray.

== See also ==
- List of Yosemite Sam cartoons
- List of Bugs Bunny cartoons

| Preceded by Shishkabugs | Bugs Bunny Cartoons; 1963 | Succeeded by The Million Hare |
