= Yosemite Sam =

Warner Bros. theatrical cartoon character

- Looney Tunes/Merrie Melodies character
- First appearance: Hare Trigger (May 5, 1945; 81 years ago)
- Created by: Friz Freleng; Michael Maltese
- Voiced by: Mel Blanc (1945–1989); Joe Alaskey (1988, 1990–1992, 1995–1997, 2004–2005, 2010–2011); Jeff Bergman (1989–1993, 1997, 2002–2004, 2014, 2021, 2026); Charlie Adler (1990); Greg Burson (1991, 1994, 1996–1998); Maurice LaMarche (1991–2017); Jim Cummings (1996–1997, 2000, 2014); Bill Farmer (1996); Frank Gorshin (1997); Jeff Bennett (2003–2004); Fred Tatasciore (2017–present); Eric Bauza (2018); (see below)

In-universe information
- Species: Human
- Gender: Male
- Occupation: Outlaw, cowboy, sailor, gunslinger, pirate
- Relatives: Ophiuchus Sam (descendant)

Aloysius Bartholamew Sam, better known as Yosemite Sam (/joʊˈsɛmɪti/ yoh-SEM-ih-tee) is a cartoon character in the Looney Tunes and Merrie Melodies series of short films produced by Warner Bros. Cartoons. His name is taken from Yosemite National Park in California. He is an adversary of Bugs Bunny and his archenemy alongside Elmer Fudd. He is commonly depicted as a mean-spirited and extremely aggressive, gunslinging outlaw or cowboy with a hair-trigger temper and an intense hatred of rabbits, Bugs in particular. In cartoons with non-Western themes, he uses various aliases, including "Chilkoot Sam" (named for the Chilkoot Trail; Sam pronounces it "Chilli-koot") and "Square-deal Sam" in 14 Carrot Rabbit, "Riff Raff Sam" in Sahara Hare, "Sam Schultz" in Big House Bunny, "Seagoin' Sam" in Buccaneer Bunny, "Shanghai Sam" in Mutiny on the Bunny, "Von Schamm the Hessian" in Bunker Hill Bunny, "Baron Sam von Shpamm" in Dumb Patrol, "Pancho Vanilla" in Pancho's Hideaway and many others. During the golden age of American animation, Yosemite Sam appeared as an antagonist in 33 animated shorts made between 1945 and 1964.

== History ==
Animator Friz Freleng introduced the villain character in the 1945 cartoon Hare Trigger. With his grumpy demeanor, fiery temper, strident voice, and short stature (in two early gags in Hare Trigger, a train he is attempting to rob passes right over top of him and he has to use a set of portable stairs to get on his horse; in Bugs Bunny Rides Again, he rides a miniature horse), along with his fiery red hair, Sam was in some ways a caricature of Freleng. While he often denied any intentional resemblance, in the Looney Tunes Golden Collection, surviving members of his production crew assert, and the director's daughter acknowledges, that Sam definitely was inspired by Freleng. Freleng himself even said in an interview with the Associated Press that "I have the same temperament, I'm small, and I used to have a red mustache." Other influences were the Red Skelton character Sheriff Deadeye and the Tex Avery cartoon Dangerous Dan McFoo. When he does a "slow burn" and cries "Oooooh!" he borrows a bit from such comedic character actors as Jimmy Finlayson (a frequent foil to Laurel and Hardy) and Frank Nelson (one of Mel Blanc's costars on The Jack Benny Program). Freleng also cited the Terrible-Tempered Mr. Bang, a character in the Toonerville Trolley comic strip, as an influence. In his memoir Chuck Amuck: The Life and Times of an Animated Cartoonist, Chuck Jones says that a great-uncle who occasionally visited his family was a retired Texas Ranger who was short, had red hair, a large mustache, and a hair-trigger temper (but no beard, unlike Sam). Michael Maltese originally considered calling the character Texas Tiny, Wyoming Willie, or Denver Dan, but then settled on the final name.

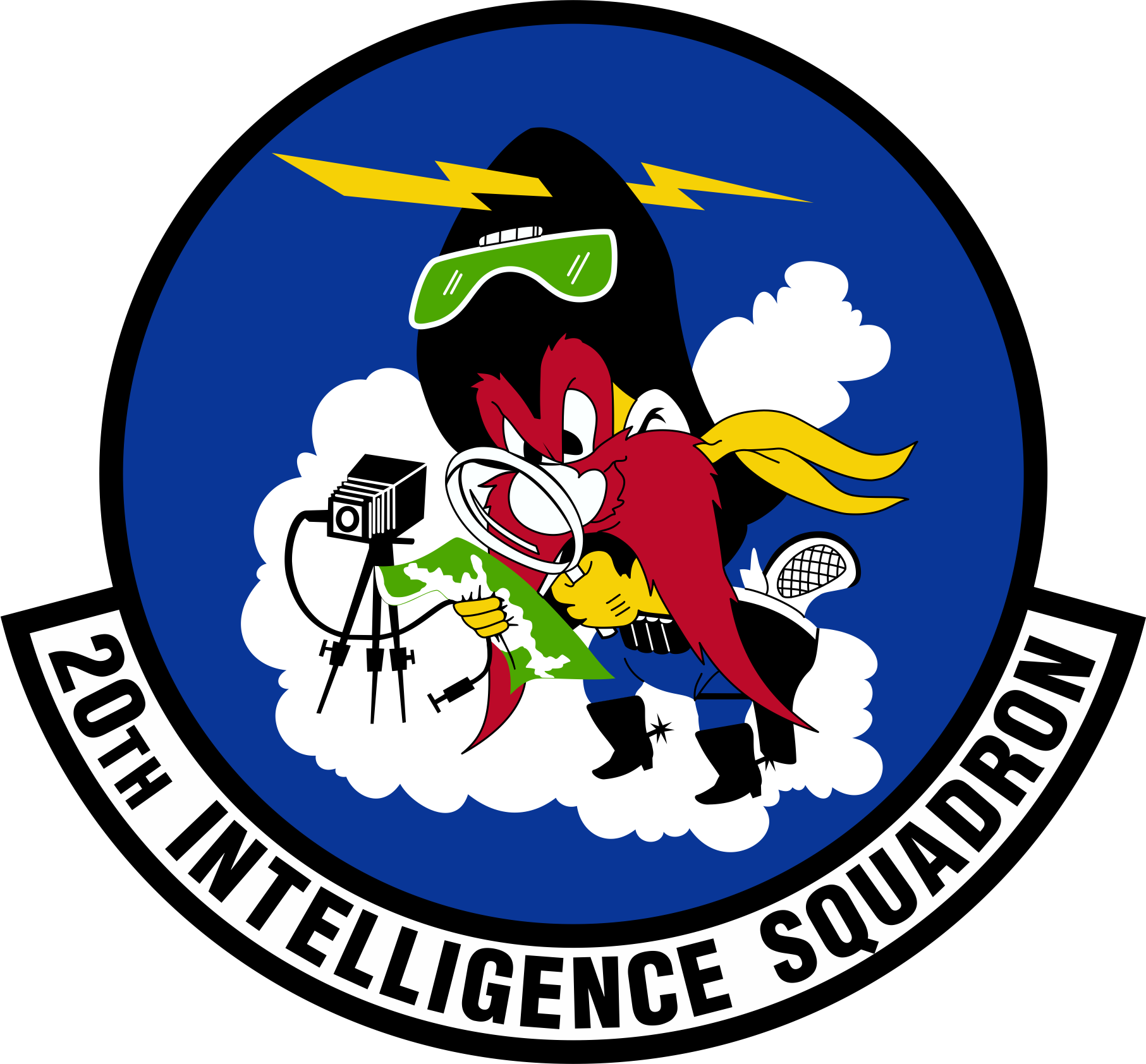
Yosemite Sam as mascot of the 20th Intelligence Squadron

Other characters with Sam-like features appear in several Looney Tunes shorts. The Bugs Bunny entry Super-Rabbit (1943) features the cowboy character "Cottontail Smith", whose voice is similar to Sam's. Stage Door Cartoon (1944), however, features a southern sheriff character that looks and sounds similar to Sam, except for a more defined Southern stereotype to his voice. In a Daffy Duck cartoon called Along Came Daffy (1947), Daffy has to contend with two starving hermits resembling Yosemite Sam, one with red hair and one with black hair. Finally, Pancho's Hideaway (1964) features a Mexican villain who is designed much like Sam but has a different accent. In addition, in the 1949 Chuck Jones-directed cartoon Mississippi Hare, Bugs Bunny battles with an old, pistol-toting gambler called Colonel Shuffle, one whose role could have easily been portrayed by Sam. (Note: The Colonel reappears in "Dog Gone South", this time pitted against Charlie Dog, and accompanied by a bulldog named Belvedere, who resembles Hector the Bulldog.)

Freleng created Yosemite Sam to be a more formidable adversary for Bugs Bunny. Until then, Bugs' major foe had been Elmer Fudd, a man so mild-mannered and good-natured that Freleng thought Bugs actually came off as a bully by duping him. Sam, on the other hand, was extremely violent and belligerent, not at all a pushover like Fudd. Freleng compacted into a tiny body and 11-gallon hat the largest voice and the largest ego "north, south, east, aaaaand west of the Pecos".

For over 19 years, except for one cartoon (Hare-Abian Nights in 1959) Freleng's unit had exclusive usage of Sam at the Warner studio. Though officially a cowboy, Freleng put Sam in a different costume in almost every film: a knight, a Roman legionary, a pirate, a royal cook, a prison guard, a duke (Duke of Yosemite, no less), a Hessian mercenary, a Confederate soldier, a mountain climber (climbing the 'Shmadderhorn' mountain in Switzerland), a hen-pecked house husband and even a space alien. The humor of the cartoons inevitably springs from the odd miscasting of the hot-tempered cowboy. However, some countries seem to prefer his pirate incarnation, as "Sam the Pirate" is his official name in France and a frequent alternative name in Italy.

While Sam's basic character is that of a cowboy, he usually wears a black Domino mask (or just a wide black outline on the outer sides of his eyes) to show that he is an outlaw. This is so associated with his persona that he wears the mask even when dressed as a duke, a riff, a pirate, or a Viking.

Sam is significantly tougher and more aggressive than Elmer Fudd when challenging Bugs Bunny. He is also quicker to learn from his mistakes and rarely falls for the same ploy twice. But despite Sam's bluster, he does not prove much brighter than Elmer in his encounters with Bugs. His noise contrasts to the calmly cocky rabbit. Sam's own cockiness always gets the best of him; Bugs can see he is incapable of turning down a challenge. Every time Bugs dares Sam to "step across that line", he cannot help but do so, even if he steps off into empty space or down a mine shaft.

Yosemite Sam was depicted without six-gun pistols in Looney Tunes Cartoons on the streaming service, HBO Max. The series' executive producer and showrunner, Peter Browngardt, said the character could still continue to use cartoon violence, such as dynamite and Acme-related paraphernalia. However, this change appears to have been reversed, as he is once again depicted using his pistols in Space Jam: A New Legacy (2021).

=== Personality ===
Sam is one of Bugs' toughest antagonists, proudly calling himself the meanest, toughest hombre in the West. Sam is a character more aggressive than Bugs' other regular antagonist, Elmer Fudd, given that Sam has a tougher accent; a higher, fiercer voice; and a more violent spirit, although he is portrayed as a bumbling fool in most of his appearances. Sam has had several occupations in his life that Bugs has gotten in the way of. Among his occupations are:

- Confederate Army soldier: In Southern Fried Rabbit, Sam is a Confederate soldier who attempts to prevent Bugs from crossing the Mason–Dixon line, although the cartoon takes place long after the American Civil War. Bugs tells Sam the war ended almost 90 years ago, but Sam insists, "I'm no clock-watcher!" and refuses to leave his post unless he receives orders from Robert E. Lee. This gag may have been inspired by the actual discovery of Japanese soldiers still manning their posts, long after World War II had ended.
- Prison guard: In Big House Bunny, Sam (known here as Sam Schulz) arrests and imprisons Bugs for a false accusation (escaping prison) and gives him 99 years in jail. However, he gets infuriated and lets Bugs out of prison after Bugs annoys him including briefly getting Sam beaten up and locked up in jail himself. However, when letting Bugs out, he is jailed by the Warden (who gets infuriated with the antics that cause Bugs to get Sam in trouble with him) for Bugs' doings and for letting a prisoner (Bugs) escape. Sam then vows to get even with the stool pigeon who squealed on him. It then cuts to Bugs on a stool making the sounds of a pigeon.
- Pirate: In Buccaneer Bunny, Sam is known as "Sea-Goin' Sam", who is trying to bury his treasure, only for Bugs to foil his attempt. In Captain Hareblower, Sam is a pirate captain who is able to intimidate and scare sailors and other pirates. Sam encounters a trading ship led by Bugs and decides to take it for himself. With all of Bugs' fellow sailors too cowardly to face Sam or to be drowned in the ocean, Bugs challenges Sam to a fight. Sam and Bugs battle each other's ships with Bugs on the verge of winning. The battle ends up with Sam being forced to abandon ship to escape an inevitable explosion on his own pirate ship. Sam then unknowingly triumphs over Bugs by lighting Bugs' "powder room" (filled with make-up, not gunpowder) into exploding and escaping by himself, but not before giving a warning for Bugs to get the match (an order Bugs does not follow, believing that "Talcum powder doesn't explode."). And in From Hare to Eternity, Sam, a.k.a. "Buccaneer Sam", tries to find treasure, only to find Bugs protecting it.
- Riff-Raffer/Cowboy: In Sahara Hare, Sam is a proud intimidating North African version of a cowboy: a Riff-Raffer who owns the Sahara Desert. When Bugs ends up in the desert when trying to find Miami Beach, he sees the rabbit trespassing and chases him into a deserted castle. Sam sees Bugs using the castle for protection and tries several unsuccessful attempts at breaking into the castle, eventually ending with Bugs escaping after causing a booby trap that Sam falls for: an armed bomb-coated door that will explode if Sam opens the door to the castle.
- Guard Captain: In Roman Legion-Hare, Sam is the captain of the Roman Imperial Guard, and he is ordered by Grand Emperor Nero to find a victim for the lions at once, or else he will be their prey. He then heads out to look for a victim with a small band of imperial guards when Bugs shows up. When asked if it was a convention of the legion, Sam replies he's looking for victims to feed the lions and is shocked to learn that no other victims – save Bugs – are present. He then chases the crafty cottontail into the Colosseum, where the lions await. Try as he might to keep the big cats quiet, they always tear his golden armor to shreds or ruffle the fuzz on his helmet. And when he does present Bugs to Nero, the lions surge directly toward them, leaving Bugs unscathed.
- Viking: In Prince Violent, Sam is a Viking grunt who attempts to raid the archduchy castle, which happens to be under Bugs's protection. Bugs teasingly tells him that it's too early for Halloween and then kicks Sam out of the castle. He even hires an Asian elephant to first ram what Sam thinks to be a door, but it is really a painting imitating a door, so the elephant is reduced to the shape of an accordion - before smashing his master into the same shape. Next, the elephant tries to demolish the castle walls with large boulders, but Bugs still remains persistent in defending the castle by sprinkling pepper over the elephant's trunk, which causes the pachyderm to sneeze and launch a bolder into Sam. Next, Bugs signals for the bridge to lower, at which point, the elephant charges onto it with Sam riding, but the elephant's weight proves to be too much for the bridge. Next, he suggests attacking the castle from the rear, but Bugs (defensive as always) cleverly places a champagne cork in the elephant's trunk, causing him to swim back to land in his struggle to breathe, leaving Sam in the water. This drives Sam to permanently evict the elephant, chasing him away: "AND DON'T COME BACK!!!!! I'll handle that Prince Varmint myself!". His attempts to raid the castle are cut short when the same elephant joins Bugs in kicking him out of the kingdom for good.
- Indian Chief: In Horse Hare, Sam is the chief of an Indian tribe during the Indian-American wars in 1886. One day, Sam sees a USA fort and decides to steal it for his tribe. He sees that Sergeant Bugs Bunny is guarding the fort and challenges him to war. Chief Sam has his men attack through various means such as launching himself into the fort, firing guns, etcetera, but Sam is put on probation when he is accused of firing at one of his soldiers (it was actually Bugs). Eventually, the USA cavalry returns, and it helps Bugs defeat Sam and his army of Indians.
- Hessian soldier in the American Revolutionary War: In Bunker Hill Bunny, Sam is Sam von Schamm, a German soldier defending a fort who attacks Bugs's fort. After being defeated, he concedes "I'm a Hessian without no aggression."
- German pilot: In Dumb Patrol, Sam is Baron Sam Von Shpamm, a World War I German Air Force pilot who tries to shoot down Bugs, but who fails and ends up as a Hell's Angel.
- Duke: In From Hare to Heir, Sam is the Duke of Yosemite. Bugs arrives at Sam's door with the promise to give him a million pounds if Sam keeps his temper. Bugs makes requests, annoys Sam at night, and stays in the bathroom in the morning, prompting Sam to lose his temper and shout unintelligible gibberish, cutting pounds off the offer in the process. When Sam comes up to Bugs saying that he does not get mad anymore, and has his assistants kick him in the rear end, throw a pie in his face and hit him on the head with a rolling pin to prove this, Bugs says "I haven't got the heart to tell him he's used up all the money."
- Legendary Mountain climber: A legendary mountain climber in Piker's Peak, Sam hears of a contest where whoever hikes up and reaches the deadly highest mountain in the world, will receive money equaled to trillions of dollars in today's money; 50,000 Cronkites (named after television host Walter Cronkite). ("Cronkite" is also a jest on "Klondike", the location of a great Gold Rush.) Sam takes up the contest, and he decides to climb up the mountain which is based on Pike's Peak. However, when he reaches the basecamp at thousands of feet, he encounters Bugs, who also hears about the contest. With both of them wanting the prize, Sam then must race and defeat Bugs along the way up to Pike's Peak to get the money.
- Cowboy: In Wild and Woolly Hare, Sam is a legendary cowboy gangster who dominates much of the wild west through intimidation. One day, he comes to take over a cafe in an Old Western town and is insulted by Bugs. Angered by the insult, Sam challenges Bugs to a fight to the death. With Bugs on the verge of winning through trickery and deception, Sam decides to try one last time to intimidate the town; to rob a train. But Bugs hijacks the train to save it. Sam tries to follow it by horse and orders Bugs to get off by the time he counts to a specific number. However, just before he reaches his final number, he always runs into some form of large obstacle, like a telephone pole or a tunnel wall and then falls off a bridge. A frustrated Sam tries to get on another train and force Bugs to surrender by preparing to ram head-on into Bugs' train. However, Bugs foils him by switching the railroad tracks causing Sam's train engine to crash hundreds of feet into a gorge's river.
- Alien: In Lighter Than Hare, Sam of Outer Space is an alien from a foreign planet. Inside a flying saucer spaceship, Sam reveals his mission to find an earth creature to take back to his planet for uses such as slaves, producing on their planet Etcetera. Sam detects Bugs and sends his army of robots to attack Bugs' hideout. After a long struggle, Sam's robots are blown to pieces. Finally, an exasperated Sam uses an incinerating laser cannon to threaten Bugs into surrendering and boarding his space ship. Sam then flies out of earth to his planet, unaware that he has actually captured a decoy of Bugs filled with bombs. When Sam presents the dummy to his leader, the bombs explode.
- Sailor: In Rabbitson Crusoe, Sam is a sailor whose boat is irreparably damaged, and lives as a castaway. ("A low tide and a high rock caused my predicament.") Sam jumps across rocks to a deserted island and spends many years there being targeted as a meal by a shark named Dopey Dick. After some time, Sam grows tired of eating coconuts and finds Bugs. He decides to cook up Bugs for dinner. After a long battle, eventually, the island is reclaimed by the seas and Sam ends up being chased by Dopey Dick. Sam is then forced to make a deal with Bugs where Bugs will not let Dopey Dick eat Sam and take Sam in his boat (the cooking pot) back to civilization ... but only if Sam is the one that does all the work in paddling 2,736 miles to San Francisco, California.
- Chef: In Shishkabugs, Sam has one of his rare performances where his goal is not for evil purposes and where he is not the aggressor. In this episode, Sam is a very kind, generous chef for a very rude, spoiled king who has Sam enslaved through blackmail. One day, Sam makes the king a usual buffet only for the King to rudely kick it away and demand something new. "Every day, it's the same thing: variety!" he complains. "I want something different!" That something new is Hasenpfeffer whose base is cooked rabbit. Sam captures Bugs and puts Bugs in the meal, but Bugs outsmarts Sam twice and the King blames it all on Sam. Eventually, the King loses his patience and has guards arrest Sam and installs Bugs as his new chef. The King claims to have set up Sam's death. But since Sam is seen alive in more episodes, it is presumed that either he was found not guilty by the kingdom court, the citizens demanded Sam's release, or Sam escaped.
- Knight: In Knighty Knight Bugs, Sam is the Black Knight and has stolen the Singing Sword. King Arthur hires court jester Bugs to retrieve the sword. After retrieving it, Bugs escapes Sam and manages to lock Sam out of his castle. Sam attempts to break back in, but each attempt backfires. Eventually, Bugs leads Sam and his fire-breathing dragon into the dynamite storage facility. The dragon sneezes, blowing the two of them to the moon.
- Trolley conductor: In Tweety's High-Flying Adventure, Sam drives a trolley in San Francisco. The trolley is hijacked by Sylvester, who is hoping to use it to chase Tweety. Instead, he breaks the throttle which is used as a brake, rendering the trolley out of control. It speeds all over San Francisco, ending up on Alcatraz. During this, Sam attests to Sylvester's idiocy, eventually chasing Sylvester all over Alcatraz with his hat. He also chases Sylvester on a train to Las Vegas, only to be locked on another train heading out of the city.

== Later years ==
Yosemite Sam made appearances in several television specials in the 1970s and 1980s, and in three of the Looney Tunes feature-film compilations. Sam was the star of his own comic book series from December 1970 to February 1984, for a total of 81 issues. Published by Gold Key / Whitman Comics, the official title of the series was Yosemite Sam and Bugs Bunny. Yosemite Sam was the main basis for the character of The Grump from DePatie–Freleng Enterprises's TV series Here Comes the Grump. The Grump's dragon was similar to Sam's in Knighty Knight Bugs, right down to the fiery nasal explosions upon its master. He also made a cameo appearance in Disney/Amblin's 1988 film Who Framed Roger Rabbit, where he is blasted out of Toontown. In the film, he is the only Looney Tunes character to not be voiced by Mel Blanc, with Joe Alaskey taking the role.

Yosemite Sam was one of the classic Looney Tunes characters who appeared as faculty members of Acme Looniversity in the 1990s animated series Tiny Toon Adventures. Sam was shown teaching classes in Firearms and Anvilology (the study of falling anvils, a staple joke in the Looney Tunes genre), and was sometimes portrayed as the school principal (though at least one episode identified Bugs Bunny as the principal, and Wile E. Coyote was Dean of Acme Loo). As with all the main Looney Tunes characters, Sam had a student counterpart at Acme Loo in Montana Max. In "K-Acme TV", Yosemite Sam was seen as the judge of "Toon Court" (a parody of The People's Court) where he proceeded over a trial where Calamity Coyote issues a complaint against the ACME Corporation for negligence and faulty workmanship. The ACME Corporation's representative Bobbo ACME claims that the devices made by the ACME Corporation work if they are used right as he demonstrates the catapult on Calamity Coyote. Judge Yosemite Sam finds in favor of the ACME Corporation. In the same episode, Yosemite Sam appeared as a prospector in a documentary detailing about the sightings of a furry creature called Bigbutt (a spoof of Bigfoot).

Yosemite Sam also appeared along with Bugs Bunny in a number of Mirinda commercials in the early 1990s due to direct competition with Fanta, which was being advertised with Disney characters at that time. Sam also appeared in the Animaniacs episodes "The Warners 65th Anniversary Special" and "Back in Style" and two episodes of the 1995 series The Sylvester and Tweety Mysteries.

He also appears in the 1996 movie Space Jam as a player for the Tune Squad. In a memorable scene, he and Elmer Fudd shoot off the teeth of one of the Monstars while clad in Pulp Fiction-esque attire, complete with Dick Dale's "Misirlou" playing. In an earlier scene, when the Nerdlucks hold all the toons hostage, he confronts the Nerdlucks, pointing his pistols at them, and orders them to release all the toons, only to have the lead Nerdluck fire a laser pistol back at him, which leaves Sam smoldering naked and beardless as the phasers burned off his mustache.

In the 2003 movie Looney Tunes: Back in Action, Yosemite Sam is a bounty hunter employed by the Acme Corporation who was hired to finish off DJ Drake and Daffy Duck. In this film, he owns a casino in Las Vegas, which he calls Yosemite Sam's Wooden Nickel, and is accompanied by Nasty Canasta and Cottontail Smith from Super-Rabbit (who may be originally employed as his security guards). He goes as far as betting a large sack of money to get the card, stealing Jeff Gordon's car, and even using a stick of Dynamite to beat DJ and Daffy.

In 2004, a possible numbers station in Albuquerque using the character's voice began transmitting, taking a piece of audio from the 1950 Merrie Melodies cartoon Bunker Hill Bunny, days after it was discovered and its location was tracked, the station ceased broadcasting but returned for a short time again in 2005, but hasn't been heard since. This was referred to as the Yosemite Sam transmission. This was also believed to have a reference to the Bugs Bunny quote "I knew I should have taken that left turn at Albuquerque."

Sam also plays the role of minor villain K'Chutha Sa'am (a parody of the Klingon) in the Duck Dodgers animated TV series.

His descendant appears in Loonatics Unleashed, where he allied with General Deuce to trick Ace into giving him his sword.

He also appears in the video games Loons: The Fight for Fame, Taz: Wanted, Bugs Bunny Crazy Castle, The Bugs Bunny Crazy Castle 2, Bugs Bunny Crazy Castle 3, The Bugs Bunny Birthday Blowout, Bugs Bunny: Rabbit Rampage, Bugs Bunny in Double Trouble, Bugs Bunny: Lost in Time, Bugs Bunny and Taz: Time Busters, Sheep, Dog, 'n' Wolf, Looney Tunes B-Ball, Daffy Duck in Hollywood and the Looney Tunes: Back in Action video game. In Looney Tunes: Acme Arsenal, Yosemite Sam makes an appearance riding a railway cart on the Wild West level. He also makes a small cameo in Multiversus as a custom ring out animation.

Yosemite Sam appears in multiple episodes of The Looney Tunes Show, voiced by Maurice LaMarche. Sam is depicted as being well meaning, but suffering anger problems. He first appeared in the show in three Merrie Melodies segments called "Blow My Stack", "Moostache" and "Stick to My Guns". Yosemite Sam is one of Bugs and Daffy's neighbors. In the episode "Daffy Duck, Esq.", it is revealed that his full name is Samuel Rosenbaum and thus established him as being Jewish (both his creator Friz Freleng and original voice actor Mel Blanc were also Jewish, though there is no evidence that Freleng had ever explicitly intended Sam to have been a Jew). In "Ridiculous Journey", it is revealed that Yosemite Sam has a cousin in Blacque Jacque Shellacque whom Yosemite Sam enlisted to recover Sylvester, Tweety, and Tasmanian Devil after they were accidentally shipped to Alaska. It was through Yosemite Sam that Bugs Bunny and Granny enlisted Blacque Jacque Shellacque's help. In "You've Got Hate Mail" after accidentally being sent an angry email by Daffy, Sam decides to change his ways and proceeds to shave, sell his cowboy clothes, and become a normal suburbanite. However, after a particularly annoying book club meeting, he reverts to his old ways.

Yosemite Sam appears in the 2015 DTV movie Looney Tunes: Rabbits Run, voiced by Maurice LaMarche. He appears in New Looney Tunes (originally Wabbit), voiced by Maurice LaMarche in season one and by Fred Tatasciore in season two and three. His appearance has him depicted to having a larger moustache, a stout body and a different hat. Yosemite Sam is often shown trying to commit crimes or obtain items where Bugs Bunny always thwarts him. He is also shown to own a lot of cats at his house.

He later appears as a recurring character in Looney Tunes Cartoons, voiced again by Fred Tatasciore, returning to his rivalry with Bugs Bunny in a similar way to their cartoons from the golden age of American animation.

In Tiny Toons Looniversity, he is usually seen accompanying Granny and is a security guard at Acme Looniversity.

Yosemite Sam appears in the Teen Titans Go! episode, "Warner Bros. 100th Anniversary". He is among the Looney Tunes characters guests for the Warner Bros. centennial celebration, voiced once again by Fred Tatasciore.

Yosemite Sam appears in the Bugs Bunny Builders episode "Yosemite Sam's Dude Ranch", voiced once again by Fred Tatasciore. Here, he's friends with the Looney Builders and asks for their assistance in building a dude ranch. He's still short-tempered and rushes the Looney Builders, but he does so out of excitement rather than malice and even tries to come up with fun ways to speed up the job, such as square dancing, lassoing, and putting wild west jumping beans in their uniforms. He's also willing to admit he was wrong when the rushed job results in the ranch falling to pieces. Finally, he doesn't carry his pistols.

In the 2026 movie Coyote vs. Acme, Yosemite Sam is the owner of the restaurant Kevin Avery is eating at before he realizes that Wile E. Coyote has set the major lawsuit in motion against the Acme Corporation.

== Voice actors ==
=== Mel Blanc ===
The role of Yosemite Sam was originated by Warners Bros' principal voice man, Mel Blanc. In his autobiography, Blanc said he had a difficult time coming up with the voice when he played a similar character called Tex on Judy Canova's radio show. He tried giving Sam a small voice at first but did not feel that it worked. One day, he decided to simply yell at the top of his voice, which was inspired by a fit of road rage he had earlier in the day. It fit perfectly with the blustery character but was also a strain on Blanc's throat; thus he always saved Yosemite Sam's lines for last during recording sessions so his voice could recover overnight. As he got into his 70s, the voice became too rough on Blanc's throat; the role of Sam was taken over by future Looney Tunes voice actor Joe Alaskey in Who Framed Roger Rabbit while Blanc played all his other Looney Tunes roles in the film. This marks one of the rare instances where Blanc was replaced for one of his Looney Tunes characters during his lifetime. Blanc used the same voice to depict Bob and Doug McKenzie's father (portrayed by Dave Thomas, but dubbed with Blanc's voice) in the film Strange Brew (1983). Blanc voiced the character for the final time in the 1989 TV special Bugs Bunny's Wild World of Sports. Archive recordings of Blanc as Yosemite Sam were used in the 1999 PlayStation video game, Bugs Bunny: Lost in Time (a decade after Blanc's death). Blanc used a voice similar to Yosemite Sam's for Mr. Spacely on The Jetsons, albeit with generally more restraint.

=== Others ===
- Gilbert Mack (Golden Records records, Bugs Bunny Songfest)
- Jerry Hausner (one line in Devil's Feud Cake)
- Unknown (Bugs Bunny Exercise and Adventure Album)
- Joe Alaskey (Who Framed Roger Rabbit, Tiny Toon Adventures, Bugs & Friends Sing the Beatles, Bugs & Friends Sing Elvis, Looney Tunes webtoons, TomTom Looney Tunes GPS, Looney Tunes ClickN READ Phonics)
- Jeff Bergman (1989 Macy's Thanksgiving Day Parade, Bugs Bunny's 50th Birthday Spectacular, Tiny Toon Adventures, Tyson Foods commercial, (Blooper) Bunny, Invasion of the Bunny Snatchers, Cartoon Network bumpers, Boomerang bumper Looney Tunes Dash, Space Jam: A New Legacy, Daffy Season)
- Noel Blanc (You Rang? answering machine messages, Bugs Bunny's Birthday Ball)
- Charlie Adler (Tiny Toon Adventures)
- Russell Calabrese (vocal effects in (Blooper) Bunny)
- Keith Scott (Mirinda commercials, Looney Tunes Musical Revue, The Christmas Looney Tunes Classic Collection, Spectacular Light and Sound Show Illuminanza, Tazos Looney Tunes commercial, KFC commercials, The Looney Tunes Radio Show, Looney Rock)
- Greg Burson (Looney Tunes River Ride, Animaniacs, ABC promo, Warner Bros. Kids Club)
- J. J. Sedelmaier (Cartoon Network presentation pitch)
- Maurice LaMarche (Bugs Bunny: Stowaway read-along, Yosemite Sam and the Gold River Adventure!, Tiny Toon Adventures, Taz-Mania, Carrotblanca read-along, Carrotblanca short, The Sylvester and Tweety Mysteries, The Looney West, Bugs Bunny's Learning Adventures, Warner Bros. Sing-Along: Quest for Camelot, Warner Bros. Sing-Along: Looney Tunes, Duck Dodgers, Bah, Humduck! A Looney Tunes Christmas, The Looney Tunes Show, Looney Tunes: Rabbits Run, Wabbit (Season 1), various video games, webtoons, and commercials)
- Jim Cummings (The Sylvester and Tweety Mysteries, Animaniacs, Tweety's High-Flying Adventure, Scooby Doo and Looney Tunes Cartoon Universe: Adventure)
- Bill Farmer (Space Jam)
- Frank Gorshin (From Hare to Eternity)
- Marc Silk (Cartoon Network bumpers)
- Will Ryan (You Don't Know Doc! ACME Wise-Guy Edition, You Don't Know Doc! Coast-to-Coast Edition, Crash! Bang! Boom! The Best of WB Sound FX)
- Jeff Bennett (Wendy's commercial, Looney Tunes: Back in Action, Hare and Loathing in Las Vegas)
- Seth MacFarlane (Family Guy)
- Gary Martin (Looney Tunes Take-Over Weekend promotion)
- Seth Green (Robot Chicken)
- Fred Tatasciore (New Looney Tunes (Season 2-3), Converse commercials, Looney Tunes Cartoons, Bugs Bunny Builders, Tiny Toons Looniversity, Teen Titans Go!, Looney Tunes: Wacky World of Sports)
- Eric Bauza (Looney Tunes: World of Mayhem)
