= 1951 in animation =

Events in 1951 in animation.

== Events ==
=== January ===
- January 6:
  - Hanna-Barbera's Tom and Jerry cartoon Casanova Cat premieres, produced by MGM's Cartoon Studio and also starring Butch & Toodles Galore.
  - Robert McKimson's Bugs Bunny cartoon Hare We Go premieres, produced by Warner Bros. Cartoons.

=== February ===
- February 3: Friz Freleng's Sylvester cartoon Canned Feud premieres, produced by Warner Bros. Cartoons.
- February 10:
  - Friz Freleng's Bugs Bunny and Yosemite Sam cartoon Rabbit Every Monday premieres, produced by Warner Bros. Cartoons.
  - Tex Avery's Cock-a-Doodle Dog premieres, produced by MGM's Cartoon Studio and starring Spike.
- February 24: Friz Freleng's Tweety and Sylvester cartoon Putty Tat Trouble premieres, produced by Warner Bros. Cartoons. This short marks the debut of Sylvester's friendly rival Sam Cat.

=== March ===
- March 3: Hanna-Barbera's Tom and Jerry cartoon Jerry and the Goldfish premieres, produced by MGM's Cartoon Studio.
- March 10: Chuck Jones' Bugs Bunny cartoon Bunny Hugged premieres, produced by Warner Bros. Cartoons in which Bugs participates in a wrestling match.
- March 24:
  - Chuck Jones' Pepé Le Pew cartoon Scent-imental Romeo premieres, produced by Warner Bros. Cartoons. Also starring Penelope Pussycat.
  - Hanna-Barbera's Tom and Jerry cartoon Sleepy-Time Tom premieres, produced by MGM's Cartoon Studio. Also starring Mammy Two Shoes, Butch, Lightning, & Meathead.
- March 29: 23rd Academy Awards: John Hubley's Gerald McBoing-Boing, produced by UPA, wins the Academy Award for Best Animated Short.
- March 31: Tex Avery's Droopy cartoon Daredevil Droopy premieres, produced by MGM's Cartoon Studio, also starring Spike.

=== April ===
- April 7: Hanna-Barbera's Tom and Jerry cartoon Jerry's Cousin premieres, produced by MGM's Cartoon Studio which marks the debut of Jerry's buff cousin Muscles. Butch & Lightning make a cameo in this short.
- April 14: Friz Freleng's Bugs Bunny and Yosemite Sam cartoon The Fair-Haired Hare premieres, produced by Warner Bros. Cartoons.
- April 22: Hanna-Barbera's Tom and Jerry cartoon His Mouse Friday premieres, produced by MGM's Cartoon Studio. This particular short was deemed controversial for its heavy depictions of African American stereotypes as its availability became limited since the 1990s.
- April 27: Jack Kinney's Goofy cartoon Cold War, which features the identity change for Goofy as "George Geef" and his wife Mrs. Geef, who is regarded to be Disney's ill-fated character decades later. This era, known as "Everyman", was notorious for its accusations on the grounds that it was sexist as women were not allowed to have their faces shown onscreen.

=== May ===
- May 5: Tex Avery's Droopy cartoon Droopy's Good Deed premieres, produced by MGM's Cartoon Studio and also starring Spike.
- May 19: Chuck Jones' short Rabbit Fire premieres; starring Bugs Bunny, Daffy Duck, & Elmer Fudd; produced by Warner Bros. Cartoons, the first short in his Hunting Season trilogy. It also marks a significant change in Daffy's personality, where the originally silly go-happy character now transforms into a more sane, selfish, unsympathetic loser.

=== June ===
- June 2: Friz Freleng's Tweety and Sylvester cartoon Room and Bird premieres, produced by Warner Bros. Cartoons. Also starring Granny and Hector the Bulldog.
- June 16:
  - Chuck Jones' Chow Hound premieres, produced by Warner Bros. Cartoons.
  - Tex Avery's Symphony in Slang premieres, produced by MGM's Cartoon Studio.
- June 30: Robert McKimson's Bugs Bunny cartoon French Rarebit premieres, produced by Warner Bros. Cartoons.

=== July ===
- July 4: Hanna-Barbera's Tom and Jerry cartoon Cat Napping premieres, produced by MGM's Cartoon Studio and also starring Spike.
- July 14: Chuck Jones' Porky Pig cartoon, The Wearing of the Grin, produced by Warner Bros. Cartoons is released, It's the final solo cartoon for Porky.
- July 26: The Walt Disney Company releases Alice in Wonderland, produced by Clyde Geronimi, Wilfred Jackson and Hamilton Luske.
- July 28: Robert McKimson's Foghorn Leghorn cartoon Leghorn Swoggled premieres, produced by Warner Bros. Cartoons. Also starring Henery Hawk & Barnyard Dawg.

=== August ===
- August 11: Friz Freleng's Bugs Bunny cartoon His Hare-Raising Tale premieres, produced by Warner Bros. Cartoons. This short marks the debut of Bugs' nephew Clyde Bunny. The short features footage from previous Bugs Bunny cartoons, such as Freleng's own Baseball Bugs & Stage Door Cartoon, Chuck Jones' Rabbit Punch & Haredevil Hare, and Bob Clampett's Falling Hare.
- August 25: Chuck Jones' short Cheese Chasers premieres, produced by Warner Bros. Cartoons. Starring Hubie and Bertie (making their final appearance in the Golden Age of Animation), Claude Cat, & the debut of Marc Antony the bulldog.
- August 27: Hanna-Barbera's Tom and Jerry cartoon Slicked-up Pup premieres, produced by MGM's Cartoon Studio and also starring Spike & Tyke.

=== September ===
- September 8:
  - Robert McKimson's Foghorn Leghorn cartoon Lovelorn Leghorn premieres, produced by Warner Bros. Cartoons. Also starring Miss Prissy & Barnyard Dawg.
- September 14: Hanna-Barbera's Tom and Jerry cartoon Nit-Witty Kitty premieres, produced by MGM's Cartoon Studio and also starring Mammy Two Shoes.
- September 22:
  - Friz Freleng's Tweety and Sylvester cartoon Tweety's S.O.S. premieres, produced by Warner Bros. Cartoons. Also starring Granny.
  - Tex Avery's Car of Tomorrow premieres, produced by MGM's Cartoon Studio.
- September 23: Hanna-Barbera's Tom and Jerry cartoon The Flying Cat premieres, produced by MGM's Cartoon Studio and also starring Cuckoo.

=== Fall ===
- The U.S. government educational short Duck and Cover, by Anthony Rizzo, begins airing in U.S. schools. The film teaches children what to do in case of a nuclear attack and features an animated sequence starring Bert the Turtle.

=== October ===
- October 5: Hanna-Barbera's Tom and Jerry cartoon The Duck Doctor premieres, produced by MGM's Cartoon Studio which features Jerry helping out a wild duckling (who shares the same voice and similar appearance as Quacker) after the latter gets constantly shot at by Tom.
- October 6: Friz Freleng's Bugs Bunny and Yosemite Sam cartoon Ballot Box Bunny premieres, produced by Warner Bros. Cartoons.
- October 20: Chuck Jones' Three Bears cartoon A Bear for Punishment premieres, produced by Warner Bros. Cartoons, it marks the Bears final appearance in the golden age of animation.

=== November ===
- November 14: Hanna-Barbera's Tom and Jerry cartoon Triplet Trouble premieres, produced by MGM's Cartoon Studio. Also starring Mammy Two Shoes and the kittens Fluff, Muff, & Puff.
- November 15: John Hubley's Rooty Toot Toot, produced by UPA, premieres.
- November 17:
  - Chuck Jones' Daffy Duck and Porky Pig cartoon Drip-Along Daffy premieres, produced by Warner Bros. Cartoons. It marks the debut of recurring villain Nasty Canasta.
  - Tex Avery's Droopy cartoon Droopy's Double Trouble premieres, produced by MGM's Cartoon Studio in which confusion arises around Droopy's twin brother for Spike.
- November 21: The following Tom and Jerry cartoons premiered on the same day:
  - Smitten Kitten (The short features archival footage from the previous Tom and Jerry cartoons: Salt Water Tabby, The Mouse Comes to Dinner, Texas Tom, & Solid Serenade).
  - Little Runaway

=== December ===
- December 1: Robert McKimson's Bugs Bunny cartoon Big Top Bunny premieres, produced by Warner Bros. Cartoons.
- December 15: Friz Freleng's Tweety and Sylvester cartoon Tweet Tweet Tweety premieres, produced by Warner Bros. Cartoons.
- December 22: Robert McKimson's Porky Pig and Daffy Duck cartoon The Prize Pest premieres, produced by Warner Bros. Cartoons.
- December 29: Jack Kinney's Goofy cartoon No Smoking, produced by the Walt Disney Company, premieres. It is controversial and rarely broadcast because the plot revolves around Goofy trying to quit smoking.

=== Specific date unknown ===
- Valentina and Zinaida Brumberg's The Night Before Christmas premieres.

== Films released ==
- January 13 - Amazon Symphony (Brazil)
- January 26 - Prince Bayaya (Czechoslovakia)
- July 26 - Alice in Wonderland (United States)
- December 31 - The Night Before Christmas (Soviet Union)

== Births ==
=== January ===
- January 3: Paul Christie, American voice actor (voice of Dan Matter and Germ in Osmosis Jones, Ram #1 in Brother Bear, C.A.R.R. in Stroker and Hoop, Jim Mathis in Our Cartoon President, Moose A. Moose in Moose and Zee).
- January 12: Rush Limbaugh, American conservative political commentator (voice of a Galactical Political Commentator and The Rancor in the Family Guy episodes "Blue Harvest" and "It's a Trap!", voiced himself in the Family Guy episode "Excellence in Broadcasting"), (d. 2021).
- January 30: Phil Collins, English drummer and musician (wrote and sang the songs in Tarzan and Brother Bear), and actor (voice of Muk and Luk in Balto, Lucky in The Jungle Book 2).

=== February ===
- February 5:
  - John Callahan, American cartoonist (creator of Pelswick and John Callahan's Quads!), (d. 2010).
  - Robin Sachs, English actor (voice of Silver Surfer in Fantastic Four, Sergeant Sam Roderick in the SpongeBob SquarePants episode "Mrs. Puff, You're Fired"), (d. 2013).
- February 10: Bob Iger, American media executive (CEO of The Walt Disney Company from 2005-2020, and 2022-2026, voice of Bob Tiger in Zootopia 2).
- February 13: David Naughton, American actor and singer (voice of Commander Locke and Dr. Noah in Sky Blue, The Streak in the Justice League episode "Legends", Orchestra Conductor Hero in the Higglytown Heroes episode "Higgly Harmonies", himself in the SuperMansion episode "Comicarnage").
- February 15:
  - Melissa Manchester, American musician (Little Nemo: Adventures in Slumberland, Lady and the Tramp II: Scamp's Adventure), and actress (voice of Miss Kitty in The Great Mouse Detective, Ms. Euphrosyne in Hercules, Jane Green in the Captain Planet and the Planeteers episode "Dirty Politics").
  - Paul Kandel, American actor (voice of Clopin Trouillefou in The Hunchback of Notre Dame and The Hunchback of Notre Dame II).
- February 16:
  - Laurie O'Brien, American actress (voice of Miss Piggy in Muppet Babies).
  - William Katt, American actor and musician (voice of Hawkman in the Batman: The Brave and the Bold episode "The Golden Age of Justice!", Green Guardman in the Justice League episode "Legends", Zowie in the Batman: The Animated Series episode "Riddler's Reform").
- February 22:
  - Ellen Greene, American actress and singer (voice of Goldie in Rock-a-Doodle, Dolly Gopher in Re-Animated and Out of Jimmy's Head, Creeping Ivy in The Magic of Herself the Elf, Mrs. Sugarby in the Rapunzel's Tangled Adventure episode "Painter's Block", Mrs. Manface in the Batman: The Brave and the Bold episode "Night of the Huntress!", Gertrude Washburn in the Pound Puppies episode "Olaf in Love").
  - Patty Shinagawa, American retired animator (Fred Wolf Films, A Family Circus Christmas, The Chipmunk Adventure, Snoopy: The Musical, The Critic), storyboard artist (The Little Clowns of Happytown, King of the Hill), sheet timer (Film Roman, Recess: School's Out, What's New, Scooby-Doo?, Family Guy, Ni Hao, Kai-Lan, American Dad!), writer (The Twisted Tales of Felix the Cat) and director (Film Roman, The Super Hero Squad Show, The Angry Beavers, Futurama, Grim & Evil).
- February 20: Edward Albert, American actor (voice of Daredevil in Spider-Man, Rafe in Invasion America, Silver Surfer in the Fantastic Four episode "Doomsday", Sheriff White in the Extreme Ghostbusters episode "The Jersey Devil", Captain Briggs in the Godzilla: The Series episode "Vision"), (d. 2006).
- February 24: Debra Jo Rupp, American actress and comedian (voice of Mrs. Helperman in Teacher's Pet, Kitty Forman in the Robot Chicken episode "Gold Dust Gasoline").

=== March ===
- March 17: Kurt Russell, American actor (voice of adult Copper in The Fox and the Hound, Ego the Living Planet in What If...?).
- March 18: Bruce Baum, American comedian (voiced himself in The Simpsons episode "The Last Temptation of Krust").
- March 19:
  - Kathy Gori, American actress (voice of Rosemary in Hong Kong Phooey, Katie Butler in Valley of the Dinosaurs, Laurie in Inch High Private Eye, Laurie Partridge in Partridge Family 2200 AD).
  - Bob Gardiner, American animator (co-director of Closed Mondays) and inventor (Claymation), (d. 2005).
- March 26: John Pomeroy, American animator, producer, writer and director (Walt Disney Animation Studios, Sullivan Bluth Studios, Warner Bros. Animation).
- March 28: Pete Kozachik, American visual effects artist (The Nightmare Before Christmas, Corpse Bride, Coraline, James and the Giant Peach, Monkeybone), (d. 2023).

=== April ===
- April 11: Dennis Snee, American screenwriter (wrote The Simpsons episode "Special Edna"), (d. 2019).
- April 12: Tom Noonan, American actor (voice of Principal in Hair High, Everyone else in Anomalisa, Phil's Dad in the Animals. episode "The Democratic People's Republic of Kitty City"), (d. 2026).
- April 13: Peabo Bryson, American musician (Beauty and the Beast, Beauty and the Beast: The Enchanted Christmas, Aladdin) and actor (voice of National Anthem Singer in the King of the Hill episode "Meet the Manger Babies"), (d. 2026).
- April 17: Olivia Hussey, British-Argentine actress (voice of Talia al Ghul in the DC Animated Universe, Queen in the Pinky and the Brain episode "Melancholy Brain"), (d. 2024).
- April 21: Tony Danza, American actor (voice of Siggy in Rumble, himself in the King of the Hill episode "Peggy's Fan Fair" and the Family Guy episode "Ready, Willing and Disabled").
- April 24: Steven Lisberger, American film director, producer and writer (Tron, Animalympics).
- April 27: Ace Frehley, American guitarist and songwriter (voice of Dr. Naniltred Faniltendriten in the Metalocalypse episode "DeathHealth" and Member With Shirt With Number 7 in the episode "Deathsiduals", himself in the Family Guy episode "A Very Special Family Guy Freakin' Christmas", and the KaBlam! episode "KaBlam! James KaBlam!"), (d. 2025).

=== May ===
- May 5: Nicholas Guest, English-American actor (voice of Martian Manhunter and Question in Batman: The Brave and the Bold, Ardeth Bay in The Mummy, Zander Barcalow in Roughnecks: Starship Troopers Chronicles, Clancy in the Ben 10 episode "Side Effects", Madoc in The Legend of Prince Valiant episode "The Shadow of Destiny").
- May 14: Jim McLean, American animator and storyboard artist (Warner Bros. Animation, Disney Television Animation, He-Man and the Masters of the Universe, Denver, the Last Dinosaur, BraveStarr, Spider-Man), (d. 2018).
- May 16: Unshō Ishizuka, Japanese voice actor (voice of Jet Black in Cowboy Bebop, Mr. Satan in the Dragon Ball franchise, Van Hohenheim in Fullmetal Alchemist: Brotherhood, Zabuza Momochi in Naruto, Joseph Joestar in JoJo's Bizarre Adventure: Stardust Crusaders, narrator and Professor Oak in Pokémon), (d. 2018).
- May 18:
  - James Stephens, American actor (additional voices in Courage the Cowardly Dog).
  - Denny Dillon, American actress and comedian (voice of Mrs. Hula in Bobby's World, Glyptodon in Ice Age, Jessy in the Batman: The Animated Series episode "Cat Scratch Fever", additional voices in Problem Child and Courage the Cowardly Dog).
- May 19: Joey Ramone, American musician and member of the Ramones (voiced himself in The Simpsons episode "Rosebud"), (d. 2001).
- May 21: Ben Hurst, American television writer (DIC Entertainment, Tiny Toon Adventures), (d. 2010).
- May 23: James M. Ward, American game designer and screenwriter (G.I. Joe: A Real American Hero), (d. 2024).
- May 28: Gordon Bressack, American television producer and writer (Hanna-Barbera, Bionic Six, DuckTales, DIC Entertainment, Warner Bros. Animation, Teenage Mutant Ninja Turtles, Darkwing Duck, Mighty Max, Fat Dog Mendoza, The Adventures of Jimmy Neutron, Boy Genius, WordGirl, The Twisted Whiskers Show, Octonauts, creator of Captain Simian & the Space Monkeys), (d. 2019).
- May 30: Stephen Tobolowsky, American actor (voice of Eric Anderson in Life with Louie, Martin Stein in Justice League Action, Calculator in The Brave Little Toaster Goes to Mars, Uncle Ubb in The Lorax, Ron the Manager in Toy Story of Terror!, Principal Purdy in Mr. Peabody & Sherman, Andy Gunderson in Scooby-Doo! Shaggy's Showdown, Principal Huggins in The Loud House, Chad in the Green Eggs and Ham episode "House", Driller in the ThunderCats Roar episode "Driller", Numericles in the Hercules episode "Hercules and the Techno Greeks", Gil in the Buzz Lightyear of Star Command episode "Mindwarp", Dr. Benson and Burt Halverstrom in the King of the Hill episode "The Exterminator", Troll in the American Dragon: Jake Long episode "Adventures in Troll-Sitting", Mr. Geekman in the Pound Puppies episode "Taboo", Stephen in the We Bare Bears episode "Tubin").

=== June ===
- June 2: Michael E. Uslan, American lawyer and film producer (Warner Bros. Animation, Dinosaucers, Where on Earth Is Carmen Sandiego?).
- June 6: Ralph Guggenheim, American video graphics designer and film producer (Toy Story).
- June 9: James Newton Howard, American composer and music producer (Walt Disney Animation Studios, Space Jam, Gnomeo & Juliet).
- June 13: Stellan Skarsgård, Swedish actor (voice of Pelle Swanson in Peter-No-Tail in Americat, Ralph Parker in Metropia, Moominpapa and Hemulens in Moomins and the Comet Chase and Moomins and the Winter Wonderland, Gordon in Gordon & Paddy, himself in The Simpsons episode "Podcast News").
- June 16: Paul McGuinness, American industry executive and manager of U2 (voiced himself in The Simpsons episode "Trash of the Titans").
- June 20: Tress MacNeille, American voice actress (voice of Chip and Gadget Hackwrench in Chip 'n Dale: Rescue Rangers, Dot and Hello Nurse in Animaniacs, Agnes Skinner in The Simpsons, Babs Bunny in Tiny Toon Adventures, Charlotte Pickles in Rugrats, Callie Briggs in SWAT Kats: The Radical Squadron, Debbie Douglas and Cobra Queen in Freakazoid!, Mom in Futurama, Fang in Dave the Barbarian, continued voice of Daisy Duck and Wilma Flintstone).
- June 24: Mark Klastorin, American voice actor (voice of Bob, Skipper, Man in White and Yuppie Dad in Aaahh!!! Real Monsters, Truckee and other various characters in The Angry Beavers, Fisherman, Ned, Cop #2 and Old Man in Johnny Bravo, Vinnie in Happy Feet, Paul Teutul Sr. in the Celebrity Deathmatch episode "Stand-up vs. Smack Down") and television writer (Back to the Future), (d. 2012).
- June 27: Julia Duffy, American actress (voice of Charlotte in Charlotte's Web 2: Wilbur's Great Adventure, Lizzie Borden in the Histeria! episode "When Time Collides", Fanny in the Pepper Ann episode "Thanksgiving Dad", Delilah in the Pinky and the Brain episode "A Little Off the Top").

=== July ===
- July 1:
  - Fred Schneider, American musician and member of The B-52's (voice of Baby Singer in The Rugrats Movie, Betty the Bank Teller in The Cleveland Show episode "The Blue, the Gray and the Brown", Danny Dazzleduff in the Captain Planet and the Planeteers episode "Greed Is the Word", performed the theme songs of Rocko's Modern Life and The Groovenians, and the song "Glove Slap" in The Simpsons episode "E-I-E-I-(Annoyed Grunt)").
  - Terrence Mann, American actor (voice of Oberon in Gargoyles, Alien Interpreter in The Tick episode "The Tick vs. the Big Nothing").
- July 4:
  - Vincent Marzello, American actor (voice of Farmer Pickles and Robert in Bob the Builder), (d. 2020).
  - Frank Weiss, American animator, sheet timer (Adelaide Productions, Life with Louie, Princess Gwenevere and the Jewel Riders, X-Men: The Animated Series, Happily Ever After: Fairy Tales for Every Child, Warner Bros. Animation, Disney Television Animation, Curious George, Brickleberry, Cartoon Network Studios, Bordertown, Dawn of the Croods, Harvey Girls Forever!, Chicago Party Aunt), xerographer (The Berenstain Bears' Christmas Tree), production manager (Duckman) and director (Cow and Chicken, Hey Arnold!, SpongeBob SquarePants).
- July 6:
  - Geoffrey Rush, Australian actor (voice of Ezylryb in Legend of the Guardians: The Owls of Ga'Hoole, Nigel in Finding Nemo, Bunyip Bluegum in The Magic Pudding, narrator in Minions and Harvie Krumpet).
  - Allyce Beasley, American actress (voice of Girl Cats in Garfield on the Town, Beazer in Pound Puppies, Mrs. Grotke in Recess, Tia in the Darkwing Duck episode "U.F. Foe", Bess in the Extreme Ghostbusters episode "Witchy Woman", Ground Finch and Penguins in The Wild Thornberrys episode "Eliza-cology", herself in the Johnny Bravo episode "Some Walk by Night", additional voices in All-New Dennis the Menace, Duckman and Lloyd in Space, announcer for Playhouse Disney).
- July 7: Roz Ryan, American actress and comedian (voice of Thalia in the Hercules franchise, and Mickey Mouse Funhouse, Cake in Adventure Time, Madam President in Buzz Lightyear of Star Command, Wade's Mom in Kim Possible, Bubbie in The Marvelous Misadventures of Flapjack, Ms. Fitzpatrick in Kick Buttowski: Suburban Daredevil, Witch Lezah in The Looney Tunes Show, Gorgeous G in the Scooby-Doo! Mystery Incorporated episode "The Night the Clown Cried II: Tears of Doom", Cow in the Mickey Mouse episode "Movie Time", Steel Magnolia in the Mighty Magiswords episode "Suitable Armor", Cyborg's Grandma Voice in the Teen Titans Go! episode "Grandma Voice").
- July 8: Anjelica Huston, American actress (voice of Magda in Arctic Dogs, Queen Usurna in Trollhunters: Tales of Arcadia, Julienne in All Hail King Julien, Angela Diaz in BoJack Horseman, Mrs. D'Abondo in Spirit of the Forest, Ellen Riggs in American Dad!, Gothel in Barbie as Rapunzel).
- July 9: Chris Cooper, American actor (voice of Smokey in Cars 3, Douglas in Where the Wild Things Are).
- July 10: Phyllis Smith, American actress and casting associate (voice of Sadness in the Inside Out franchise, narrator in The Princess and the Goblin).
- July 12: Brian Grazer, American screenwriter and film and television producer (The PJs, Curious George, Who Are You, Charlie Brown?, The Tiny Chef Show, voiced himself in The Simpsons episodes "When You Dish Upon a Star" and "Lost Verizon").
- July 13: Didi Conn, American actress (voice of Raggedy Ann in Raggedy Ann & Andy: A Musical Adventure, Cupcake in The Fonz and the Happy Days Gang, Spice in Star Fairies, Stella in A Flintstone Family Christmas, Mrs. Goldberg in Stanley, Melissa in The Jetsons episode "Judy Takes Off", Caroller in the Rugrats episode "Babies in Toyland", Muskox in The Wild Thornberrys episode "Clash and Learn", Oldest Annacille in the Welcome to the Wayne episode "Some Sort of Bad Luck Curse").
- July 15: Kiki Shepard, American television host (voice of Polly in the Oh Yeah! Cartoons segment "Jamal the Funny Frog" and Naomi in the segment "That's My Pop!"), (d. 2026).
- July 18: Margo Martindale, American actress (voice of Mrs. Brinson in My Entire High School Sinking Into the Sea, Louise "Barnstormer" Nash in Cars 3, Ma Beagle in DuckTales, Judge Morpho in Infinity Train).
- July 19: Debra Byrd, American singer and vocal coach (The Lion King franchise, Thumbelina), (d. 2024).
- July 21:
  - Robin Williams, American actor and comedian (portrayed himself in the SpongeBob SquarePants episode "Truth or Square", voice of Mork in Mork & Mindy/Laverne & Shirley/Fonz Hour, Genie in Aladdin, Aladdin and the King of Thieves and Great Minds Think 4 Themselves, The Kiwi in A Wish for Wings That Work, Batty Koda in FernGully: The Last Rainforest, Fender Pinwheeler in Robots, Ramón and Lovelace in Happy Feet and Happy Feet Two), (d. 2014).
  - Lillias White, American actress and singer (voice of Calliope in the Hercules franchise and the Mickey Mouse Funhouse episode "Daisy and the Muses").
- July 24: Fiona Reid, Canadian actress (voice of Tubby Bear in Noddy's Toyland Adventures, Mrs. Jenkins in Timothy Goes to School).
- July 25: Michel Lyman, American animator (The Little Rascals Christmas Special, A Family Circus Christmas, A Chipmunk Christmas, The Mighty Kong), storyboard artist (DIC Entertainment), sheet timer (Film Roman, DIC Entertainment, Klasky Csupo, Nickelodeon Animation Studio, Hyperion Pictures, Adelaide Productions, All Dogs Go to Heaven: The Series, Family Guy, Mike, Lu & Og, Generation O!, Disney Television Animation, The Cramp Twins, Warner Bros. Animation, Stripperella, American Dad!, Cartoon Network Studios, LeapFrog, Brickleberry, Madea's Tough Love, Bordertown, Dawn of the Croods, She-Ra and the Princesses of Power, Guardians of the Galaxy), lip sync artist (Mike, Lu & Og, King of the Hill, Tron: Uprising, Guardians of the Galaxy), animatic editor (Adventure Time), production manager (The California Raisin Show), producer (The Legend of Prince Valiant) and director (The Legend of Prince Valiant, The Real Adventures of Jonny Quest, The Angry Beavers, Phantom 2040, C Bear and Jamal, The Grim Adventures of Billy & Mandy, Sym-Bionic Titan), (d. 2018).
- July 28: Danny Mann, American actor (voice of Sparky in Planes and Planes: Fire & Rescue, Serge in the Open Season franchise, Albert Einstein and Harry Houdini in Time Squad, Dinosaur Neil in The Tick, Hector in Heathcliff).

=== August ===
- August 3: Jay North, American actor (voice of Prince Turhan in the Arabian Knights segment of The Banana Splits, Terry Dexter in Here Comes the Grump, Bamm-Bamm Rubble in The Pebbles and Bamm-Bamm Show, himself in The Simpsons episode "Take My Wife, Sleaze"), (d. 2025).
- August 12: Hiroshi Ogawa, Japanese animator (Shin-Ei Animation) and film director (Crayon Shin-chan), (d. 2013).
- August 14: Carl Lumbly, American actor (voice of Martian Manhunter in the DC Animated Universe and Justice League: Doom, Anansi in Static Shock, Stalker in Batman Beyond, Silas Stone in Justice League: Gods and Monsters, Tornado Tyrant in the Batman: The Brave and the Bold episode "Hail the Tornado Tyrant!", William Marcus in The Real Adventures of Jonny Quest episode "Other Space").
- August 17: Wesley Eure, American actor, singer, author, director, educator and producer (Dragon Tales).
- August 21: Randy Thom, American sound designer (Walt Disney Company, Warner Bros., DreamWorks Animation, Illumination, Blue Sky Studios).
- August 22: Earl Kress, American animation historian, storyboard artist (The Kwicky Koala Show, The Addams Family) and screenwriter (Fat Albert and the Cosby Kids, The Fox and the Hound, Hanna-Barbera, The Transformers, The Berenstain Bears, Ghostbusters, Warner Bros. Animation, Mother Goose and Grimm, Disney Television Animation, The New Woody Woodpecker Show, Winx Club, The X's, Monster Allergy, Geronimo Stilton), (d. 2011).
- August 28:
  - Wayne Osmond, American pop musician (voiced himself in The Osmonds), (d. 2025).
  - Barbara Hambly, American novelist and screenwriter (Jayce and the Wheeled Warriors, M.A.S.K., She-Ra: Princess of Power, The Centurions, Starcom: The U.S. Space Force).

=== September ===
- September 2:
  - Michael Gray, American actor (voiced himself in Archer and in the Goober and the Ghost Chasers episode "Aloha Ghost"), (d. 2026).
  - Mark Harmon, American actor (voice of Superman in Justice League: Crisis on Two Earths, Leroy Jethro Gibbs in the Family Guy episode "Tom Tucker: The Man and His Dream", Bob Markham in The Legend of Tarzan episode "Tarzan and the Outbreak").
- September 3: Lou Richards, American actor (voice of Leader-1 in Challenge of the GoBots, Galtar in Galtar and the Golden Lance, Flash Gordon in Defenders of the Earth).
- September 4: Scott Shaw, American comic book artist, animator, storyboard artist (DIC Entertainment, Warner Bros. Animation, Disneytoon Studios, Muppet Babies, Film Roman, Fantastic Four, Hey Arnold!, The Secret Files of the Spy Dogs, Mickey's Once Upon a Christmas, Rocket Power, The Tangerine Bear, American Dragon: Jake Long, Tutenstein, The High Fructose Adventures of Annoying Orange), character designer (Hanna-Barbera, Duck Dodgers), writer (Hanna-Barbera) and producer (The Completely Mental Misadventures of Ed Grimley, Camp Candy).
- September 5: Michael Keaton, American actor (voice of the title character in Porco Rosso, Chick Hicks in Cars, Ken in Toy Story 3, Walter Nelson in Minions, Jack Crowley in The Simpsons episode "Pokey Mom", Trip Larsen in the King of the Hill episode "Pigmalion").
- September 10:
  - Steve Kehela, American actor (voice of Monstar BLANKO and Announcer in Space Jam, Dr. Zan'dozz Zeeltor in Men in Black: The Series, Krusty Krab Training Video Narrator and TV Narrator in SpongeBob SquarePants, Ricky, Sergeant O'Larry, Brick Buster and Narrator in ChalkZone, additional voices in Curious George).
  - Sally Grace, English actress (voice of Weasel and Owl in The Animals of Farthing Wood, Mrs. Wicket in Mr. Bean: The Animated Series), (d. 2026).
- September 12: Joe Pantoliano, American actor (voice of Victor Palotti in Godzilla: The Series, Sparky in Beethoven, Jojo Stomopolous in the Life with Louie episode "Caddy on a Hot Tin Toof", Pan in the Hercules episode "Hercules and the King for a Day", Dante in The Simpsons episode "The Mook, the Chef, the Wife and Her Homer", Stickyfins Whiting in the SpongeBob SquarePants episode "The Getaway").
- September 13:
  - Harvey Cohen, American composer and orchestrator (Walt Disney Animation Studios, Warner Bros. Animation), (d. 2007).
  - Jorge Maestro, Argentine screenwriter (Jungle Tales), (d. 2025).
  - Jean Smart, American actress (voice of Asako Tsukishima in Whisper of the Heart, Maggie Foley in Static Shock, Pickles Oblong in The Oblongs, Ann Possible in Kim Possible, Depression Kitty in Big Mouth, Miriam Bullock in the American Dad! episode "One Little Word", Helen Ventrix in the Batman: The Animated Series episode "See No Evil").
- September 14: Alan Decker, American re-recording mixer (Dragon Tales, Jackie Chan Adventures, Max Steel, Harold and the Purple Crayon, The Simpsons), (d. 2020).
- September 15: Fred Seibert, American television producer (Hanna-Barbera, founder of Frederator Studios).
- September 16: Bob Rosenfarb, American screenwriter (Heathcliff, Defenders of the Earth, The Get Along Gang, The Wuzzles), (d. 2026).
- September 17: Cassandra Peterson, American actress, writer, and singer (voice of Elvira in Scooby-Doo! Return to Zombie Island and Happy Halloween, Scooby-Doo!, Drella Diabolique in Lego Scooby-Doo! Haunted Hollywood, Lirrak in Dota: Dragon's Blood, Amber in The Haunted World of El Superbeasto, Severina in the Super Robot Monkey Team Hyperforce Go! episode "Season of the Skull", Queen in the JJ Villard's Fairy Tales episode "Snow White", Mrs. Campbell and Utrom Queen in Teenage Mutant Ninja Turtles).
- September 19: Ralph Farquhar, American producer and writer (The Proud Family).
- September 21:
  - Carl Macek, American actor, writer, and producer (Robotech), (d. 2010).
  - Otis Day, American actor (additional voices in the Drawn Together episode "Toot Goes Bollywood").
- September 25: Mark Hamill, American actor (voice of Joker in the DC Animated Universe, The Killing Joke, Justice League Action, Robot Chicken, Scooby-Doo and Guess Who? and Justice League: Crisis on Infinite Earths, Luke Skywalker in The Star Wars Holiday Special and the Star Wars Forces of Destiny episode "The Path Ahead", Fire Lord Ozai in Avatar: The Last Airbender, Skips in Regular Show, Solomon Grundy in Justice League, Abraham Kane in Motorcity, Trickster in Justice League Unlimited, Justice League Action and Scooby-Doo and Guess Who?, Tony Zucco in The Batman, Spectre in Batman: The Brave and the Bold, Hobgoblin in Spider-Man, Colonel Muska in Castle in the Sky, Stickybeard in Codename: Kids Next Door, Larry 3000 in Time Squad, Skeletor in Masters of the Universe: Revelation, Ferris Boyle in the Batman: The Animated Series episode "Heart of Ice", Darth Bane in the Star Wars: The Clone Wars episode "Sacrifice", Mr. Noggin in The Ren & Stimpy Show episode "Bellhops", Flint in the Buzz Lightyear of Star Command episode "Planet of the Lost", Moth in the SpongeBob SquarePants episode "Night Light" and himself in Pepper Ann, The Simpsons episode "Mayored to the Mob", the Freakazoid! episode "And Fanboy Is His Name", the Robot Chicken episode "Plastic Buffet", the Scooby-Doo and Guess Who? episode "The Sword, The Fox, and the Scooby Doo!", and the Justice League Action episode "Missing the Mark").
- September 27: Phil Tippett, American film director and visual effects designer (Star Wars Trilogy, Dragonslayer, RoboCop, Dinosaur!, Mad God, founder of Tippett Studio).

=== October ===
- October 2: Sting, English musician, composer (The Emperor's New Groove) and actor (voice of Zarm in Captain Planet and the Planeteers, himself in Bee Movie and The Simpsons episode "Radio Bart", performed "My Funny Friend and Me" in The Emperor's New Groove).
- October 3: Nick Glennie-Smith, English composer (The Lion King franchise, Despicable Me franchise, Wreck-It Ralph franchise, Winnie the Pooh franchise, Shark Tale, The Simpsons Movie, Legends of Oz: Dorothy's Return, Big Hero 6, The Little Prince, Smallfoot, Strange World), (d. 2026).
- October 17: Luis Pérez Pons, Venezuelan actor (Latin American dub voice of Mr. Krabs in SpongeBob SquarePants, Harvey Bullock in Batman: The Animated Series, Chief Angel Rojas in The Batman, Bibbo Bibbowski in Superman: The Animated Series, Granny Goodness in Justice League, Mr. Dickenson in Beyblade, Kamiya in Speed Grapher, Roddy MacStew in Freakazoid!, Santa Claus in Space Goofs, Ego the Living Planet in Silver Surfer, Mr. Hitcher in Tiny Toon Adventures: How I Spent My Vacation, Captain Smith in Titanic: The Legend Goes On), (d. 2023).
- October 18: Pam Dawber, American actress (voice of Mindy McConnell in Mork & Mindy/Laverne & Shirley/Fonz Hour, Perdy in 101 Dalmatians: The Series, Liese in the Adventures from the Book of Virtues episode "Self-Discipline").
- October 26: Peter S. Seaman, American screenwriter and producer (Who Framed Roger Rabbit, Shrek the Third).
- October 28:
  - Renato Cecchetto, Italian actor (dub voice of Hamm in Toy Story, P.T. Flea in A Bug's Life, Shrek in the Shrek franchise, The Abominable Snowman in Monsters, Inc. and Monsters University, School of Moonfish in Finding Nemo, Uncle Max in The Lion King 1½, Mack in Cars, Mustafa in Ratatouille, John in WALL-E, Tom in Up, Mr. Trout in The Boxtrolls, Razaq in The Breadwinner, Meow Meow Fuzzyface in BoJack Horseman, Fritz in Inside Out, Earl in The Good Dinosaur, Bill in Finding Dory, Juan Ortodoncia in Coco, Cleveland Brown in seasons 12-19 of Family Guy, Mr. Ellingboe in Klaus), (d. 2022).
  - Joe R. Lansdale, American novelist and television writer (Warner Bros. Animation).
  - Samuel C. Crutcher, American sound editor (Quest for Camelot, Futurama, The PJs, Dilbert, Mission Hill).
- October 30: Harry Hamlin, American actor (voice of Anthony Romulus and Cameron Kaiser in Batman: The Animated Series, Sir Lymon in The Legend of Prince Valiant episode "The Traitor").
- October 31: Randy Cartwright, American animator and writer (Walt Disney Animation Studios, DreamWorks Animation, Warner Bros. Animation).

=== November ===
- November 2: Ginny McSwain, American voice director (Disney Television Animation, Nickelodeon Animation Studio, The Batman, Ozzy & Drix, Rocket Power, Bobby's World, The Mask: Animated Series, Earthworm Jim).
- November 9: Lou Ferrigno, American actor and retired professional bodybuilder (voice of the Hulk in The Incredible Hulk, Billy and Bobby in Adventure Time, Paul in the We Bare Bears episode "Yard Sale").
- November 15: Beverly D'Angelo, American actress (voice of Darlene in Hair High, Interrogator Wright in Battle for Terra, Mom and Sheila Altoonian in Scooby-Doo! Mystery Incorporated, Lurleen Lumpkin in The Simpsons episodes "Colonel Homer" and "Papa Don't Leech", Ellen Griswold in the Family Guy episode "Blue Harvest").
- November 16: Miguel Sandoval, American actor (voice of El Toro Fuerte in Jackie Chan Adventures, Enrique in Solar Opposites, Principal Aguilar in Static Shock, Ose Martelo in the Generator Rex episode "Outpost", Dr. Arroyo in The Zeta Project episode "His Maker's Name").
- November 17: Stephen Root, American actor (voice of Bill Dauterive and Buck Strickland in King of the Hill, Bubbles in Finding Nemo and Finding Dory, Penguin and Woozy Winks in Batman: The Brave and the Bold, Bud Gleeful in Gravity Falls, Master Junjie in Kung Fu Panda: Legends of Awesomeness, Mildew in Dragons: Riders of Berk, Mayor Toadstool in Amphibia, Reverend Amos Howell/Unity in the Superman: The Animated Series episode "Unity", Val-Yor in the Teen Titans episode "Troq").
- November 20: Rodger Bumpass, American actor and comedian (voice of Hannover Fiste and Dr. Anrak in Heavy Metal, Blond Pirate in Porco Rosso, Man pointing at Young Hercules in Hercules, Harry Mosquito in A Bug's Life, Squidward Q. Tentacles in SpongeBob SquarePants, Professor Membrane in Invader Zim, Louis Tully in The Real Ghostbusters, Grumbles Grizzly in Bonkers, Doctor Light in Teen Titans and Teen Titans Go!, Chief in Where on Earth Is Carmen Sandiego?, Perkins in Scooby-Doo! and the Witch's Ghost, Clerk in Toy Story 2, Maine Man and Rick the Soldier in The Iron Giant, Male Villager #1 and Male Villager #8 in The Emperor's New Groove, Mr. Hickenbottom and Chief of the Watch in Atlantis: The Lost Empire, Foreman in Spirited Away, News Anchor in Monsters, Inc., Announcer for Nerve News Network in Osmosis Jones, Turnbuckle and Police Robot #1 in Treasure Planet, Man in Lilo & Stitch, Male Bear #2 in Brother Bear, Mr. Incredible's Lawyer in The Incredibles, Hunter #1 in Curious George, Claude Scruggs in Cars, Screaming Patron in The Haunted World of El Superbeasto, General Smith and Driver in Kung-Fu Magoo, Jerry Jablonski in Monsters University, Sharks in Seal Team).
- November 23: David Rappaport, English actor (voice of MAL in Captain Planet and the Planeteers), (d. 1990).
- November 29: Carl Finch, American musician and member of Brave Combo (Dragon Ball, Case Closed, Click and Clack's As the Wrench Turns, provided additional music for the Futurama episode "Fun on a Bun", voiced himself in The Simpsons episode "Co-Dependents' Day").

=== December ===
- December 1:
  - Obba Babatundé, American actor, director, producer and singer (voice of Conroy in Rocket Power, Boko in The Wild Thornberrys Movie, Chief Ankamuti in Kangaroo Jack: G'Day U.S.A.!, King Teredor in Winx Club, Judge and Bibliobot in All-Star Superman).
  - Treat Williams, American actor (voice of Professor Milo in Batman: The Animated Series, himself in The Simpsons episode "A Totally Fun Thing That Bart Will Never Do Again"), (d. 2023).
- December 2: Kevin Hopps, American television producer (Quack Pack) and writer (Hanna-Barbera, Disney Television Animation, Warner Bros. Animation, Rudolph the Red-Nosed Reindeer and the Island of Misfit Toys, Make Way for Noddy, The Zula Patrol, Cartoon Network Studios, A.T.O.M., W.I.T.C.H., Zorro: Generation Z, Johnny Test, Hellboy Animated, WordGirl, The Spectacular Spider-Man, Wolverine and the X-Men, Zevo-3, Kaijudo, Hulk and the Agents of S.M.A.S.H., Miles from Tomorrowland, Star Wars Rebels, Shimmer and Shine, Octonauts, Muppet Babies, Esme & Roy, Octonauts: Above & Beyond).
- December 7: Daniel Branca, Argentine animator and comic artist, (d. 2005).
- December 14: Pierre DeCelles, Canadian animator (Pound Puppies and the Legend of Big Paw, Spiral Zone, Adventures of Sonic the Hedgehog).
- December 16: Deborah Pratt, American actress, television producer and writer (Our Friend, Martin).
- December 24: Paul and Gaëtan Brizzi, French twin artists, painters, illustrators, animators and film directors.
- December 29: Andy Gaskill, American animator, art director, and storyboard artist (Walt Disney Animation Studios).
- December 31:
  - Tom Hamilton, American musician and member of Aerosmith (voiced himself in The Simpsons episode "Flaming Moe's").
  - Janet-Laine Green, Canadian actress (voice of Wish Bear in the Care Bears franchise, Mother Bear in Little Bear, Void in Wild C.A.T.s, Xayide in The Neverending Story).

=== Specific date unknown ===
- Richard Bowman, American animator, director (ChalkZone, Danny Phantom) and sheet timer (X-Men, The Simpsons, Muppet Babies, Captain Planet and the Planeteers, Æon Flux, Men in Black: The Series, My Friends Tigger & Pooh), (d. 2021).
- Jeff Kwitny, American television writer (DIC Entertainment, Warner Bros. Animation, Cow and Chicken).
- Bruce Faulconer, American composer, musician, and record producer (Dragon Ball Z).

== Deaths ==
=== March ===
- March 30: Edwin George Lutz, German-American cartoonist, illustrator, and non-fiction writer of training manuals about art and drawing techniques, (wrote the training manual Animated Cartoons - How they are made, their origin and development, which offered practical ideas for streamlining the production of animated drawings and influenced the techniques used by early animation studios; aspiring animator Walt Disney first read Lutz's book at the age of 19. The book was one of the primary animation guides used by Disney's Laugh-O-Grams studio team in Kansas City, Missouri, throughout the 1920s), dies at age 82.

=== April ===
- April 5: Harry Hemsley, English comedian, radio presenter, comics artist, illustrator, actor and animator (made a 1940 animated short based on the characters from his Ovaltiney's Concert Party radio show and comics in which he also voiced himself), dies at age 73.

=== May ===
- May 5: Larry Grey, English magician (voice of Bill the Lizard in Alice in Wonderland), dies at age 56.

=== June ===
- June 3: Rollin Hamilton, American animator (Walt Disney Company, Warner Bros. Cartoons), dies at age 52.

=== July ===
- July 2: Sam Cobean, American cartoonist (Walt Disney Animation Studios, The Fox and the Crow), dies at age 37.

=== August ===
- August 14: William Randolph Hearst, American film producer, newspaper publisher, and politician, (founder and owner of the animation studio International Film Service, produced animated adaptations of the comic strips Krazy Kat, The Katzenjammer Kids, And Her Name Was Maud, Happy Hooligan, Jerry on the Job, Bringing Up Father, Abie the Agent, and Judge Rummy), dies at age 88.
- August 24: Henri Rivière, French painter and designer, (created a form of shadow play for the Chat Noir cabaret. Shadow plays are considered a precursor to silhouette animation), dies at age 87.

=== November ===
- November 20: Lou Skuce, Canadian cartoonist, illustrator and animator (animator for the animation studio Bray Productions), dies at age 65.

=== December ===
- December 26: Wally Maher, American actor (original voice of Screwy Squirrel), dies at age 43.

== See also ==
- List of anime by release date (1946–1959)
