= Looney Tunes Golden Collection: Volume 1 =

2003 American DVD box set

- DVD cover
- Directed by: Chuck Jones; Friz Freleng; Robert McKimson; Bob Clampett; Arthur Davis; Abe Levitow
- Produced by: Leon Schlesinger; Eddie Selzer; John W. Burton
- Starring: voice of Mel Blanc
- Music by: Carl Stalling; Milt Franklyn
- Distributed by: Warner Home Video
- Release date: October 28, 2003
- Running time: 411 minutes
- Country: United States
- Language: English

Looney Tunes Golden Collection: Volume 1 is a DVD box set that was released by Warner Home Video on October 28, 2003. The first release of the Looney Tunes Golden Collection DVD series, it contains 56 Looney Tunes and Merrie Melodies cartoons and numerous supplements. The set won the Classic Award at the Parents' Choice Awards.

== Related releases ==
In Regions 2 and 4, the discs were packaged as follows:

- Disc 1: Best of Bugs Bunny
- Disc 2: Best of Daffy and Porky
- Disc 3 (Region 2): All Stars - Volume 1
- Disc 4 (Region 2): All Stars - Volume 2
- Discs 3 and 4 (Region 4): All Stars - Volumes 1 and 2

In Region 1, discs 3 and 4 were also released separately as the more family-friendly Looney Tunes Premiere Collection (also known as Looney Tunes Spotlight Collection: Volume 1). In 2014, discs 3 and 4 were reissued as Looney Tunes Center Stage: Volume 1 and Looney Tunes Center Stage: Volume 2, respectively.

== Disc 1 - Best of Bugs Bunny ==
All cartoons on this disc star Bugs Bunny.

#	Title	Co-stars	Year	Director	Series
1	Baseball Bugs	The Gashouse Gorillas Baseball Team	1946	Friz Freleng	LT
2	Rabbit Seasoning	Daffy, Elmer	1952	Chuck Jones	MM
3	Long-Haired Hare		1949	Chuck Jones	LT
4	High Diving Hare	Sam	1949	Friz Freleng	LT
5	Bully for Bugs		1953	Chuck Jones	LT
6	What's Up Doc?	Elmer	1950	Robert McKimson	LT
7	Rabbit's Kin	Pete Puma	1952	Robert McKimson	MM
8	Water, Water Every Hare	Gossamer	1952	Chuck Jones	LT
9	Big House Bunny	Sam	1950	Friz Freleng	LT
10	Big Top Bunny		1951	Robert McKimson	MM
11	My Bunny Lies over the Sea		1948	Chuck Jones	MM
12	Wabbit Twouble	Elmer	1941	Bob Clampett	MM
13	Ballot Box Bunny	Sam	1951	Friz Freleng	MM
14	Rabbit of Seville	Elmer	1950	Chuck Jones	LT

=== Special features ===
==== Audio bonuses ====
- Music-only audio tracks on Rabbit Seasoning, What's Up Doc?, Rabbit's Kin
- Audio commentaries
  - Michael Barrier on Rabbit Seasoning, Long-Haired Hare, Bully for Bugs, Big Top Bunny, Wabbit Twouble
  - Greg Ford on High Diving Hare, What's Up Doc?
  - Stan Freberg on Rabbit's Kin

==== From the Vaults ====
- Bonus cartoon: (Blooper) Bunny (Bugs Bunny, Daffy Duck, Elmer Fudd, Yosemite Sam; 1997) - with optional commentary by Greg Ford
- Bugs Bunny at the Movies Excerpts: Two Guys From Texas (1948), My Dream Is Yours (1949)
- The Bugs Bunny Show: A Star is Bored bridging sequences; The Astro-Nuts audio recording sessions with Mel Blanc
- Trailer gallery: Bugs Bunny's Cartoon Festival, Bugs Bunny's Cartoon Jamboree
- Stills gallery

==== Behind-the-Tunes ====
- Bugs: A Rabbit For All Seasonings: A look at Warner Bros. (and Looney Tunes) most popular wascally wabbit, Bugs Bunny.
- Short-Fuse Shootout: The Small Tale of Yosemite Sam: A look at Yosemite Sam, the fiery redheaded cowboy character that served as one of Bugs' many adversaries.
- Forever Befuddled: A look at Elmer Fudd, the naive (and often neurotic) everyman and hunter who also was one of Bugs' many adversaries.

==== Others ====
- A greeting from Chuck Jones
- Camera Three: The Boys From Termite Terrace: Part 1 (1975)

== Disc 2 - Best of Daffy & Porky ==
All cartoons on this disc star Daffy Duck, Porky Pig, or both.

#	Title	Daffy, Porky, or Both?	Co-stars	Year	Director	Series
1	Duck Amuck	Daffy	Bugs	1953	Chuck Jones	MM
2	Dough for the Do-Do	Porky		1949	Friz Freleng	MM
3	Drip-Along Daffy	Both	Nasty Canasta	1951	Chuck Jones	MM
4	Scaredy Cat	Porky	Sylvester	1948	Chuck Jones	MM
5	The Ducksters	Both		1950	Chuck Jones	LT
6	The Scarlet Pumpernickel	Both	Elmer, Henery, Sylvester, Mama Bear, Melissa	1950	Chuck Jones	LT
7	Yankee Doodle Daffy	Both		1943	Friz Freleng	LT
8	Porky Chops	Porky		1949	Arthur Davis	LT
9	The Wearing of the Grin	Porky		1951	Chuck Jones	LT
10	Deduce, You Say!	Both		1956	Chuck Jones	LT
11	Boobs in the Woods	Both		1950	Robert McKimson	LT
12	Golden Yeggs	Both	Rocky	1950	Friz Freleng	MM
13	Rabbit Fire	Daffy	Bugs, Elmer	1951	Chuck Jones	LT
14	Duck Dodgers in the 24½th Century	Both	Marvin	1953	Chuck Jones	MM

=== Special features ===
==== Audio bonuses ====
- Music-only audio tracks on Duck Amuck, Drip-Along Daffy, The Scarlet Pumpernickel, Rabbit Fire
- Audio commentaries by Michael Barrier on Duck Amuck, Drip-Along Daffy, The Scarlet Pumpernickel, The Wearing of the Grin, Duck Dodgers in the 24½th Century

==== Behind-the-Tunes ====
- Hard Luck Duck: A profile on Daffy Duck.
- Porky Pig Roast: A Tribute to the World's Most Famous Ham: A look on Porky from his early black and white beginnings to the development of Mel Blanc, who brought to the character the famous stutter.
- Animal Quackers: A look at the teaming of Daffy with his ultimate foil, Porky Pig and the introduction of Marvin The Martian and the Duck Dodgers In The 24½ Century persona.

==== Others ====
- Camera Three: The Boys From Termite Terrace: Part 2 (1975)
- Stills gallery

== Disc 3 - Looney Tunes All-Stars: Part 1 ==
Cartoons 1-12 are directed by Chuck Jones (10 co-directed by Abe Levitow), 13 and 14 by Bob Clampett.

#	Title	Characters	Year	Series
1	Elmer's Candid Camera	Elmer, Proto-Bugs	1940	MM
2	Bugs Bunny and the Three Bears	Bugs, The Three Bears	1944	MM
3	Fast and Furry-ous	Wile E. Coyote and the Road Runner	1949	LT
4	Hair-Raising Hare	Bugs, Gossamer	1946	MM
5	Awful Orphan	Charlie, Porky	1949	MM
6	Haredevil Hare	Bugs, K-9, Marvin	1948	LT
7	For Scent-imental Reasons	Pepé, Penelope	1949	LT
8	Frigid Hare	Bugs, Playboy Penguin	1949	MM
9	The Hypo-Chondri-Cat	Claude Cat, Hubie and Bertie	1950	MM
10	Baton Bunny	Bugs	1959	LT
11	Feed the Kitty	Marc and Pussyfoot	1952	MM
12	Don't Give Up the Sheep	Ralph and Sam	1953	LT
13	Bugs Bunny Gets the Boid	Bugs, Beaky	1942	MM
14	Tortoise Wins by a Hare	Bugs, Cecil	1943	MM

=== Special features ===
==== Audio bonuses ====
- Music-only audio tracks on Baton Bunny, Feed the Kitty
- Audio commentaries
  - Stan Freberg on Bugs Bunny and the Three Bears
  - Michael Barrier on Fast and Furry-ous, Haredevil Hare, For Scent-imental Reasons, Bugs Bunny Gets the Boid
  - Michael Barrier and Greg Ford on Hair-Raising Hare
  - Greg Ford on Feed the Kitty

==== From the Vaults ====
- ToonHeads episode "The Lost Cartoons" (originally broadcast March 2000)
- Hair-Raising Hare and The Hypo-Chondri-Cat schematics
- Stills gallery

==== Behind-the-Tunes ====
- Too Fast, Too Furry-ous: A look at the creation of the Road Runner and Wile E. Coyote cartoons, Chuck Jones' famous chase cartoon series.
- Merrie Melodies: Carl Stalling and Cartoon Music: A look at Carl Stalling and how he composed music for the Looney Tunes/Merrie Melodie cartoons.
- Blanc Expressions: A look at voice actor, Jerome Melvin "Mel" Blanc (colloquially known as "The Man of 1000 Voices") and how he voiced the Looney Tunes characters.

== Disc 4 - Looney Tunes All-Stars: Part 2 ==
Cartoons 1-9 are directed by Friz Freleng, 10-14 by Robert McKimson.

#	Title	Characters	Year	Series
1	Canary Row	Sylvester, Tweety, Granny	1950	MM
2	Bunker Hill Bunny	Bugs, Sam	1950	MM
3	Kit for Cat	Elmer, Sylvester	1948	LT
4	Putty Tat Trouble	Sylvester, Tweety	1951	LT
5	Bugs and Thugs	Bugs, Rocky and Mugsy	1954	LT
6	Canned Feud	Sylvester	1951	LT
7	Lumber Jerks	Goofy Gophers	1955	LT
8	Speedy Gonzales	Speedy, Sylvester	1955	MM
9	Tweety's S.O.S.	Sylvester, Tweety, Granny	1951	MM
10	The Foghorn Leghorn	Foghorn, Henery, Barnyard	1948	MM
11	Daffy Duck Hunt	Barnyard, Daffy, Porky	1949	LT
12	Early to Bet	Supreme Cat	1951	MM
13	A Broken Leghorn	Foghorn, Prissy	1959	LT
14	Devil May Hare	Bugs, Taz	1954	LT

=== Special features ===
==== Audio bonuses ====
- Music-only audio tracks on Putty Tat Trouble, Speedy Gonzales, A Broken Leghorn
- Audio commentaries
  - Jerry Beck on Canary Row, Canned Feud, Speedy Gonzales, and Devil May Hare
  - Michael Barrier on Tweety's S.O.S. and The Foghorn Leghorn

==== From the Vaults ====
- Bosko, the Talk-Ink Kid (1929)
- Virgil Ross pencil tests
- Stills gallery

==== Behind-the-Tunes ====
- Needy For Speedy: A look at Speedy Gonzales, Robert McKimson's heroic Mexican mouse who tricked gringo pussycats (and later, Daffy Duck) to help get cheese for his starving friends.
- Putty Problems and Canary Rows: A look at how Sylvester and Tweety were created and how their pairing led to some of the most memorable cartoons in Warner Bros. history.
- Southern Pride Chicken: A look at Foghorn Leghorn, the loud-mouthed, trickster rooster loosely based on Fred Allen's Senator Claghorn character.

==== Others ====
- Irreverent Imagination: The Golden Age of Looney Tunes (documentary)

== Reception ==
In their review of the set, the Parents' Choice Foundation, at their Parents' Choice Award site, awarded the release the "Classic Award" for its high quality in presenting classic material. While cautioning parents about some of the cartoon violence, the review called the set, "solid gold, not just because of the brilliant animated shorts but because of the plethora of commentaries, historical documentaries on the minds behind the madness," and "a true treasure of imagination worth having in your DVD library."

The DVD site, The Digital Bits claimed that Looney Tunes had been one of the most anticipated releases since the inception of the DVD format, and noted that the wait had been "long, but in the end definitely worthwhile." The site's reviewer wrote that the cartoon shorts on the DVDs looked, "brighter, much more colourful, cleaner, sharper, and generally better-framed than their Laserdisc counterparts," which, until that time, had been the best home-format for viewing the cartoons. The reviewer noted that the "very generous selection of supplements" were "almost uniformly informative and entertaining."

The multimedia news and reviews website, IGN complained about the selection of shorts offered on the first set in the Looney Tunes Golden Collection series. First pointing out that it would be impossible not to leave out major cartoons by selecting only 56 out of the 1,100 Looney Tunes, the review criticized the selection for the omission of Knighty Knight Bugs, an Academy Award-winning 1958 Bugs Bunny cartoon. IGN complimented the restoration of the shorts, but noted that dust was visible in some cases. The reviewer noted that there were more extras than cartoons on the set, and singled out the audio commentaries for praise due to their variety.

== See also ==
- Looney Tunes Golden Collection
- Looney Tunes and Merrie Melodies filmography
  - Looney Tunes and Merrie Melodies filmography (1929–1939)
  - Looney Tunes and Merrie Melodies filmography (1940–1949)
  - Looney Tunes and Merrie Melodies filmography (1950–1959)
  - Looney Tunes and Merrie Melodies filmography (1960–1969)
  - Looney Tunes and Merrie Melodies filmography (1970–present)
