= His Hare-Raising Tale =

- Directed by: I. Freleng
- Story by: Warren Foster
- Starring: Mel Blanc
- Music by: Carl Stalling
- Animation by: Virgil Ross; Manuel Perez; Ken Champin; Arthur Davis
- Layouts by: Hawley Pratt
- Backgrounds by: Paul Julian
- Color process: Technicolor
- Production company: Warner Bros. Cartoons
- Distributed by: Warner Bros. Pictures
- Release date: August 11, 1951
- Running time: 7 minutes
- Language: English

His Hare-Raising Tale is a 1951 Warner Bros. Looney Tunes short, directed by Friz Freleng and written by Warren Foster. The short was released on August 11, 1951, and stars Bugs Bunny and his nephew Clyde Bunny.

This cartoon consists primarily of clips from five previous cartoons: Baseball Bugs (1946), Stage Door Cartoon (1944), Rabbit Punch (1948), Falling Hare (1943), and Haredevil Hare (1948).

== Plot ==
Bugs Bunny and his nephew Clyde Bunny are sitting on a couch looking at a scrap book depicting various photographs and newspaper clippings of Bugs. In this cartoon Clyde is unnamed.

Segment one has Clyde asking if Uncle Bugs was a baseball pitcher and Bugs replying that he was "the best". This segment uses clips from Baseball Bugs, though Bugs refers to the opposing team as "The Boston Argyle Socks" rather than The Gas-House Gorillas. Bugs does not reveal the conclusion of his baseball hit but when his nephew asks what happened, Bugs replies that he went into vaudeville.

Segment two uses a clip from Stage Door Cartoon. Bugs' nephew then asks what happened with the act and Bugs says he broke it up because "my partner demanded equal billing" and then adds that "there was more money in boxing anyway".

Segment three has Bugs telling his nephew that he fought "The Champ" at "Madison Round Garden". Two clips from Rabbit Punch are used. By Round 110 Bugs says the fight ended because "along came the war".

In segment four, a brief clip from Falling Hare is shown as Bugs explains that he was a test pilot assigned to a supersonic aircraft (an anachronism since it wasn't until 1947 that genuinely supersonic aircraft were developed). He further explains that while flying the aircraft something went wrong and it heads toward the ground, nose first, then stops a few inches from impact because the plane "ran out of gas".

In the last segment, Bugs' nephew looks at him with admiration and says: "Gee, Uncle Bugs, you've been everyplace, I guess...except the moon", when Bugs replies that he's been there too, and points to newspaper clipping in the scrapbook. Then a clip from Haredevil Hare is shown. Bugs then begins to explain that he was lucky that he had plenty of carrots, because it took scientists 22 years to build a ladder to reach him.

After the moon story Bugs' nephew looks at him with doubt, prompting Bugs to reply: "Don't you believe me? Why if every word I've said isn't true, I hope I'm run over by a streetcar", and suddenly a streetcar appears in the room and runs over Bugs. He then looks at his alarmed nephew and says: "I suppose you don't believe I was run over by a streetcar!"

Preceded by French Rarebit	Bugs Bunny Cartoons; 1951	Succeeded by Ballot Box Bunny
