= Clyde Bunny =

Warner Bros. theatrical cartoon character

- Looney Tunes character
- First appearance: His Hare-Raising Tale (1951)
- Created by: Friz Freleng
- Voiced by: Mel Blanc (1951–1989); June Foray (1979); Bob Bergen (2004–present)

In-universe information
- Species: Hare/Rabbit
- Gender: Male
- Family: Unnamed mother Unnamed father Unnamed cousin
- Relatives: Bugs Bunny (uncle)

Clyde Bunny is a cartoon character who appears in three Looney Tunes shorts. He is the nephew of Bugs Bunny.

== Appearances ==
Clyde made his first appearance in His Hare-Raising Tale. Clyde visits his uncle Bugs who narrates about playing baseball (as seen in Baseball Bugs), going to the Moon (as seen in Haredevil Hare), and being in the military (as seen in Falling Hare). Clyde does not believe Bugs.

His second appearance was in Yankee Doodle Bugs, where he has difficulty trying to remember information for a test. Bugs narrates about history, placing himself in all of the events. Later in the day, Clyde returns home with a sour look on his face. Bugs asks him "Well, Clyde! How did you make out on your history exam?" Clyde puts a dunce cap on his head and asks "Does this answer your question?"

Clyde appeared in the 1979 Christmas-themed short, Bugs Bunny's Looney Christmas Tales.

He later appeared in the 2004 Looney Tunes webtoon Bunk Bedlam in which he goes summer camping with Sylvester Jr.

His most recent appearance is in the 18th episode of the second season in New Looney Tunes.
