= (Blooper) Bunny =

1991 cartoon directed by Greg Ford and Terry Lennon

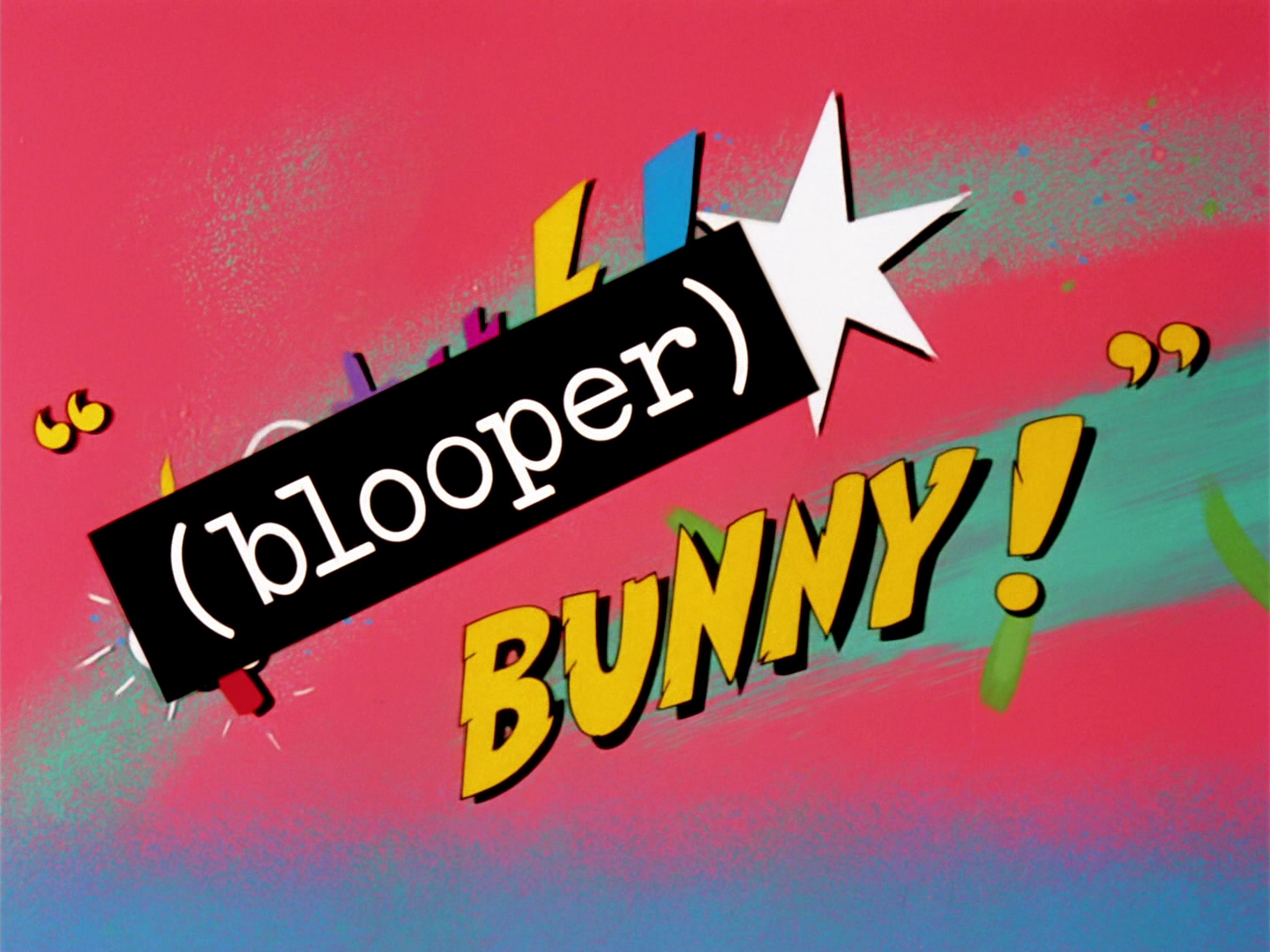
- Title card
- Directed by: Greg Ford; Terry Lennon
- Story by: Ronnie Scheib; Greg Ford; Terry Lennon
- Produced by: Greg Ford
- Starring: Jeff Bergman; Gordon Hunt; Russell Calabrese
- Music by: George Daugherty
- Animation by: Doug Compton; Nancy Beiman; Russell Calabrese; Frank Gabriel; Bob McKnight; Nelson Rhodes; Larry Ruppel; Louis Tate; Dean Yeagle
- Production company: Warner Bros. Animation
- Release date: June 13, 1997
- Running time: 8 minutes 20 seconds
- Language: English

(Blooper) Bunny is a Merrie Melodies animated short film directed by Greg Ford and Terry Lennon, with music by George Daugherty, produced in 1991 by Warner Bros. Animation. Featuring the voice talents of Jeff Bergman, Gordon Hunt, and Russell Calabrese, the short is a parody of some of the specials produced for Bugs Bunny's 50th anniversary the previous year. The short never received its intended theatrical release and was shelved for six years. It was finally given a television premiere on Cartoon Network on June 13, 1997. It is featured on the Looney Tunes Golden Collection: Volume 1 as of 2003, and on the Bugs Bunny 80th Anniversary Collection as of 2020.

== Synopsis ==
The cartoon opens with a short special, celebrating Bugs Bunny's 51st and a Half Anniversary Spectacular. Once that is finished, what happened earlier that day is shown, with a backstage look at the characters (featuring 3D rendering of the scenery). Bugs is shown rehearsing his one line in the special. Elmer Fudd is shown trying to use minoxidil to regrow his hair. Daffy Duck and Yosemite Sam are shown only begrudgingly going along with the act, complaining non-stop until called to their places by the director. They attempt a performance, which results in a series of animated "bloopers".

=== Featured bloopers ===
- Bugs Bunny begins to dance, but the music is slightly out of tune and the record skips. He then dryly looks at the camera and says, "Ehh...What's up, Doc?" in an annoyed and sarcastic voice. The director and producers laugh as Bugs walks offstage. He then peeks back in to say "Monotonous, isn't it?", which gets the director and producers laughing again before the record scratches.
- Bugs halts the routine midway, explaining he noticed a loose floorboard which could pose a hazard to his "esteemed fellow thespians". He suggests cutting the action back and readjusting the camera.
- Bugs misses the cane when it flies out.
- The cane is thrown before Bugs is ready to catch it, much to his frustration.
- While waiting for the cane to be thrown, it becomes clear that Daffy Duck has refused to throw it to Bugs. According to Daffy, his contract states that he is not supposed to throw canes to "stupid rabbits" and that Bugs' people spoke to his, resulting in the director agreeing to have someone else throw it in Daffy's place.
- Daffy enters the stage at the exact time that Bugs does, saying that he thought it was a vast improvement as he walks away, only to bump his head on the boom mike.
- Daffy does not appear when he is supposed to. Offstage, Daffy is heard telling Bugs, the director and the producers to wait, followed by the sound of a toilet flushing. As Daffy rushes onto the stage dancing, the director yells in exasperation, "Cut! CUT! CUT!"
- Elmer Fudd fires his real gun as opposed to the prop gun that shoots a flag and confetti, grazing Daffy's head. Bugs scolds him, but Elmer responds that he thought that it would be "a gweat, big birthday surpwise if after 51 1/2 years of twying, [he] finally bwasted [Bugs]". Daffy starts yelling at Elmer for not using the prop gun and refuses Bugs's insistence on cutting. As he walks away telling Elmer to expect his lawyers to call him, he steps on the loose board Bugs had avoided earlier, and the board strikes him in the face and goes through his beak. When Bugs asks if they can cut now, Daffy grumbles, "You smug son of a—" and is then cut off by Bugs.
- Daffy dances onto the stage with the board still stuck to his face. Bugs uses a hand mirror to reveal this to Daffy. When he pulls it off, he yanks his beak off as well in the process, but continues speaking and where his beak was, a mouth appears, though he fails to notice it.
- Everything plays out correctly until Yosemite Sam emerges from the cake with a scowl on his face and two Cowgirls come up and spruce him up. The director asks him to act a little more enthusiastic and caring for the next take. Sam reluctantly agrees, practices a toothy grin and goes back into the cake, mumbling "But I hates rabbits".
- The spectacular performance is done perfectly, except for one thing, as Bugs puts it – there were supposed to be five rockets, but Sam replies "There were five! And I lit 'em, too!". The fifth rocket, attached to Sam's belt, sends him flying about before crashing into the camera. He then yells at Bugs, calling him a "carrot-chomping flop-eared, bobtailed rabbit", along with his usual cursing (which lasts throughout the credits) before being silenced by an unseen glass object. Bugs then suggests that what had just happened can be fixed in the editing, before one of the producers asks, "Can we go to lunch now?" The familiar "That's All Folks" runs up the screen at the very end as if written in the film emulsion (like on raw footage).

== Cast ==
- Jeff Bergman as Bugs Bunny, Daffy Duck, Elmer Fudd, Yosemite Sam
- Gordon Hunt as Off-Screen Director
- Russell Calabrese as Man in Audience, Movers, Vocal Effects

== Production ==
(Blooper) Bunny was produced between 1990 and 1991 at a time when newer Looney Tunes shorts were being released to introduce the Warner cartoon characters to a modern generation — a process that was, thanks to the tepid reception of 2003's Looney Tunes: Back in Action, eventually discontinued for some time from 2004 to 2009. Greg Ford and Terry Lennon began production on the short with the idea of working the story into a future compilation special. The idea of Bugs Bunny, Daffy Duck, Elmer Fudd and Yosemite Sam acting friendly while being filmed but being their adversarial selves off-camera was done as a critical jab toward the executives at Warner Bros. for their handling of the characters at the time (marketing them in the vein of Disney). According to Lennon, "On-camera, they've got their big marketing grins on their faces; off-camera, they want to kill each other." The film was animated using a combination of both new computer technology (done by Bill and Susan Kroyer) and traditional cel animation — a first for a Warner Bros. cartoon — with three-dimensional rendering distorting the background in the "backstage" scenes to give the appearance of a handicam being used. The first "backstage" scene in the film, a sequence that goes on for nearly a minute and a half without a cut, is, according to Ford, one of the single longest uninterrupted shots ever attempted in animated cartoons. The characters in the scene were animated by Nancy Beiman (Bugs and Daffy), Dean Yeagle (Elmer), and Nelson Rhodes (Sam).

The short features several direct references to some of the previous output of Warner Bros. animation department. During the first, aforementioned "backstage" scene, the name of Bosko, the first true Looney Tunes star, can be seen on one of the dressing room doors for a few frames (ironically, the Warner Bros. studio did not own the rights to Bosko at the time). Midway through the film, there is also a deliberate homage to the "Hunting Trilogy" made popular by Chuck Jones, of whom Ford reportedly holds great admiration. Additionally, during the end credits, "Hello! Ma Baby," a song featured prominently in the Chuck Jones-directed One Froggy Evening, can be heard.

== Suppression, rediscovery, and subsequent reputation ==
(Blooper) Bunny is a self-parody of some of the specials produced for Bugs Bunny's 50th anniversary the previous year, 1990. Intended to be released theatrically in 1991 with the Warner Bros.-released animated film Rover Dangerfield, the short, however, never received its intended theatrical release and was shelved for six years, due to the executives at the studio not liking the short's edgy humor, which included "the sound of a toilet flushing". According to co-director Greg Ford, the executives withheld the short's release due to one of Daffy Duck's lines where he criticizes the studio for "not having an original bone in [their] body". Ford smuggled the finished print of the short out of the studio, informing executive vice president Lisa Henson that he was taking the print to finish its post-production.

Kevin S. Sandler stated in his book, Reading the Rabbit: Explorations in Warner Bros. Animation, "Unfortunately, (Blooper) Bunny's corporate irreverence proved to be its downfall. Time Warner delayed the cartoon's release in theaters, on video, or on television for six years. Possibly believing that (Blooper) Bunny's combination of hyperbole, innuendo, profanity, and wickedness might contribute to the "paradigmatic disarray" of the now-watered-down Looney Tunes characters, the heads of Time Warner in 1991 decided to shelve (Blooper) Bunny rather than risk potential public outcry."

Jonathan Rosenbaum, in a review for Chicago Reader, noted: "Ironically, Invasion of the Bunny Snatchers, another Bugs Bunny cartoon directed at the same time by the same rebellious duo, Greg Ford and Terry Lennon, is even more directly critical of studio greed, yet it got a pass and wound up on the TV special Bugs Bunny's Creature Features, perhaps because it was less formally transgressive."

(Blooper) Bunny would not receive a television premiere until 1997, when it was broadcast on Cartoon Network. It is featured on disc 1 of the Looney Tunes Golden Collection: Volume 1 DVD as of 2003, and on disc 3 of the Bugs Bunny 80th Anniversary Collection Blu-ray as of 2020, along with an optional audio commentary by Ford.

Jules Faber, in a review for DVD.net, lauded the cartoon as a "highlight" and elaborated further: "Blooper Bunny: Bugs Bunny's 51 1/2 Anniversary is a clever little blooper reel created in 1991 and utilizing some brilliantly conceived early 3D rendering making a very funny behind the scenes mockumentary." Chicago Reader also gave the film a positive mention, saying:

Much of what's funny about Blooper Bunny is the temperament of the aging cast: Bugs rehearsing his opening line, "Gosh, I'm so unimportant," over and over; Elmer still trying to grow hair with tonic; Daffy insanely jealous about being upstaged and threatening to have "my people" talk to "your people"; and Sam grouchily declaring as he's being forklifted onstage that he couldn't care less how old Bugs is — he still hates rabbits.

Dawn Taylor in a mixed review for The DVD Journal, however, said: "it has some very funny moments, and falls completely flat in others."
