= Rabbit's Kin =

- Title card
- Directed by: Robert McKimson
- Story by: Tedd Pierce
- Starring: Mel Blanc; Stan Freberg
- Music by: Carl Stalling
- Animation by: Charles McKimson; Herman Cohen; Rod Scribner; Phil DeLara; Keith Darling
- Layouts by: Robert Givens
- Backgrounds by: Richard H. Thomas
- Color process: Technicolor
- Production company: Warner Bros. Cartoons
- Distributed by: Warner Bros. Pictures; The Vitaphone Corporation
- Release date: November 15, 1952
- Running time: 6:54
- Language: English

Rabbit's Kin is a 1952 Warner Bros. Merrie Melodies animated short directed by Robert McKimson and written by Tedd Pierce. The cartoon was released on November 15, 1952, and stars Bugs Bunny. The cartoon was animated by Charles McKimson, Herman Cohen, Rod Scribner, Phil DeLara and Keith Darling. The music was scored by Carl Stalling while the layouts and the backgrounds were done by Robert Givens and Richard H. Thomas.

== Plot ==
A small brown rabbit named Shorty seeks refuge from the pursuing cougar, Pete Puma, within Bugs Bunny's rabbit hole. Bugs, sympathetic to Shorty's plight, employs comedic strategies to outwit Pete. Utilizing a faux rabbit dynamite decoy, Bugs orchestrates an explosive surprise for Pete, leading to a humorous exchange over cigars.

Subsequently, Pete's attempts to deceive Bugs, including disguising himself as Shorty's mother and employing protective headgear, are met with Bugs' repeated tea-time trickery involving sugar lumps. Despite Pete's efforts to anticipate Bugs' moves, he repeatedly falls victim to Bugs' cleverness. Shorty, captivated by the spectacle, desires to participate, leading to a confrontation wherein Bugs assumes a disguise to rescue Shorty from Pete. However, Pete's attempt to outwit Bugs backfires, resulting in self-inflicted head trauma.

As Bugs and Shorty escape, Bugs acknowledges Pete's ingenuity while saying, “He’s much too smart for us!” mimicking his distinctive laugh after.

== Production notes ==
Mel Blanc provided the voice for Bugs Bunny and Shorty Rabbit, while Stan Freberg voiced Bugs' adversary, Pete Puma, imitating Frank Fontaine's character, John L. C. Silvoney, from The Jack Benny Show and later, Crazy Guggenheim on The Jackie Gleason Show. The title plays on the phrase "rabbit skin", referencing Bugs' kinship with another rabbit. Blanc initially used a modified version of Sylvester the Cat's voice for Shorty before adjusting its pitch.

== Home media ==
Rabbit's Kin is available on the Looney Tunes Golden Collection: Volume 1 DVD set and on the Looney Tunes Collector's Vault: Volume 3 Blu-ray set.

Preceded by Rabbit Seasoning	Bugs Bunny Cartoons; 1952	Succeeded by Hare Lift
