= Hare Lift =

1952 Looney Tunes short by Friz Freleng

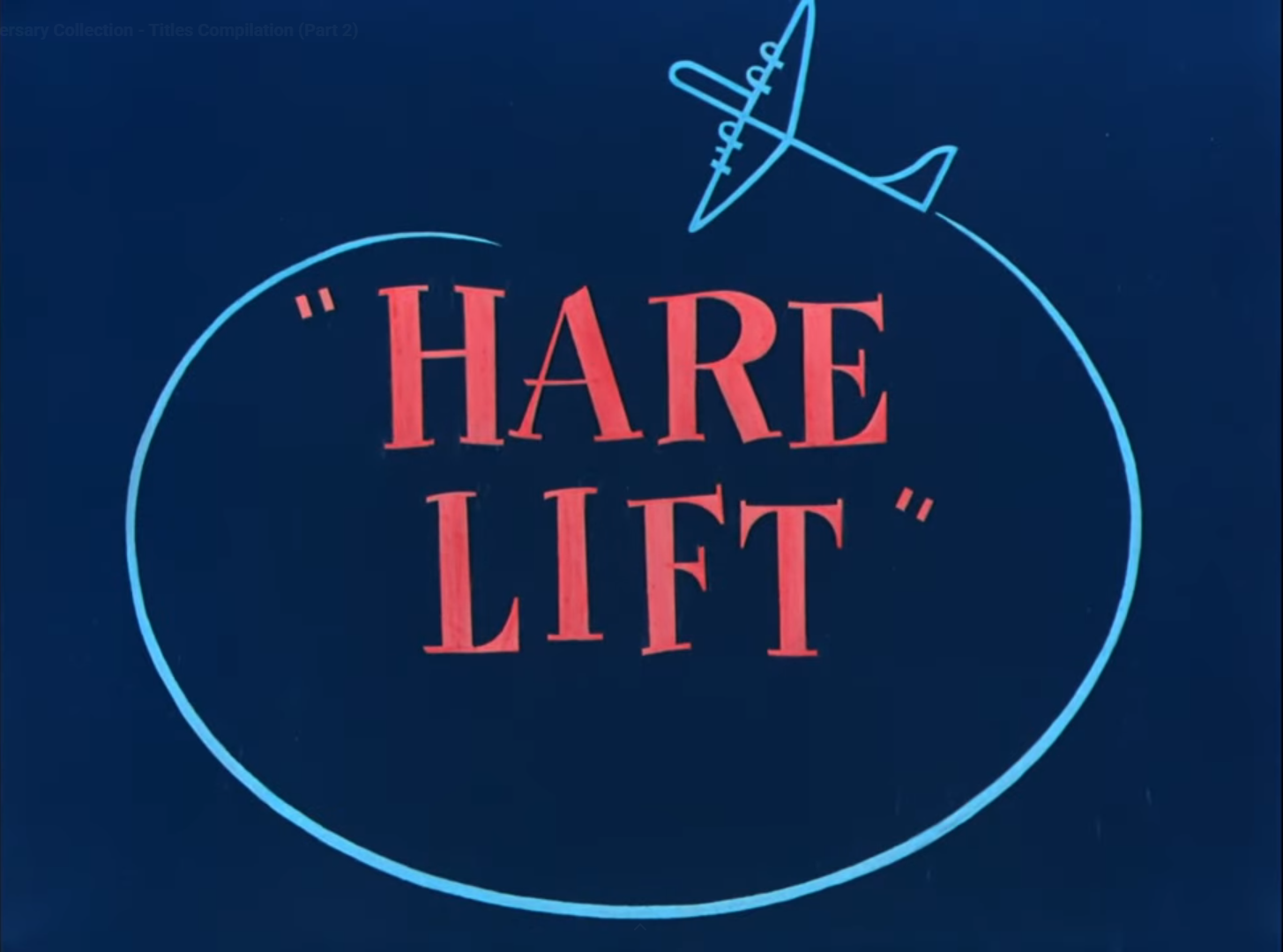
- Title card
- Directed by: I. Freleng
- Story by: Warren Foster
- Starring: Mel Blanc (all voices)
- Edited by: Treg Brown
- Music by: Carl W. Stalling
- Animation by: Ken Champin; Arthur Davis; Manuel Perez; Virgil Ross
- Layouts by: Hawley Pratt
- Backgrounds by: Irv Wyner
- Color process: Technicolor
- Production company: Warner Bros. Cartoons
- Distributed by: Warner Bros. Pictures; The Vitaphone Corporation
- Release date: December 20, 1952 (USA)
- Running time: 7 minutes
- Language: English

Hare Lift is a 1952 Warner Bros. Looney Tunes short directed by Friz Freleng. The short was released on December 20, 1952, and stars Bugs Bunny and Yosemite Sam. The title is a play on the term "air lift," as expressed in the plotline. Some scenes where Yosemite Sam has trouble staying inside the plane as well as the banana peel gag sending him outside the door, sticking to it in fear, were somewhat reused from the 1943 Merrie Melodies cartoon Falling Hare. Scenes from this cartoon were reused in the 1963 Merrie Melodies cartoon Devil's Feud Cake and "Act 1" of the 1981 package film The Looney Looney Looney Bugs Bunny Movie.

== Plot ==
A newspaper announces the test flight of the world's biggest airplane. The plane lands at an airport, its giant wheel covering Bugs Bunny's hole. Bugs struggles out and, impressed by the plane, decides to take a look inside. Meanwhile, in town, Yosemite Sam robs the Last National Bank ("and keep a-reachin' for the ceilin'- till ya' REACH it!!") then wipes off the assets, which read $4,562,321.08, left down to 8 cents. He hears the police approach and drives off to the airport, with plans to hijack a plane and take refuge in another country where the cops cannot find him.

Inside the plane, Bugs has started to pretend he is a World War II pilot, and when Sam boards, he assumes Bugs is the pilot and orders him to take off at once. Before Bugs can protest, Sam threatens to shoot him. Bugs succeeds in finding the ignition button, and the plane sets off down the runway and flies over a busy traffic intersection.

Racing toward a skyscraper, Bugs pulls the plane up into outer space, sending Sam falling to the plane's tail. When it seems as if the plane is about to crash into the Moon, Bugs steers the plane back down toward Earth, sending Sam falling to the plane's nose. As Sam threatens to have Bugs' license revoked, he discovers the rabbit reading a flying manual and realizes in horror that Bugs is not a pilot and has absolutely no idea how to fly the aircraft. Noticing the Earth growing larger in the window and worrying that they might fatally crash to the ground if Bugs does not do something quick, Sam orders Bugs to read faster, or else. Bugs, however, refuses to read any further in the manual because of Sam's distainful behavior and orders him to apologize. Sam slaps himself in the head. The United States appears in the window; Sam apologizes to Bugs, but not without insulting him. Bugs then orders Sam to "say [he's] sorry with sugar on it." Sam refuses and tries to act nonchalant by playing with a yo-yo and a set of jacks. As a farm appears in the window, Sam finally gives in and apologizes properly.

Bugs steers the plane straight back up to the sky, just barely missing the farm in the process, and goes to radio the authorities to inform them that he is returning the plane. Sam then orders Bugs to give him the flying manual to keep him from heading back to town where the cops are after him, but Bugs throws it out the open door. Sam runs out to retrieve it, but upon discovering how high he is, he "runs" back in. Bugs then lets Sam slip on a banana peel and out the other door. When he hears Sam knocking at the door, Bugs pretends to be a grocer ("Sorry, can't use any today! [slams door on him] Try next Wednesday."). Burning with anger, Sam bursts back in and threatens to blow Bugs to Kingdom Come. Since Sam happens to be standing on the bomb bay doors, Bugs pulls a cord and sends Sam falling out of the plane. Sam panics mid-air and scrambles back into the plane.

Fed up with Bugs' flying, Sam orders Bugs to turn the controls over to him. Instead, Bugs breaks off the control column and tosses it out of the plane, causing the aircraft to descend. Afraid of crashing, Sam activates the robot pilot. The pilot comes out, assesses the situation, concludes it is hopeless, takes one of the two parachutes from the parachute locker, and jumps out of the plane itself.

With just one parachute left, Bugs decides he and Sam should draw straws to see who gets it. Sam suggests that Bugs should draw the straws, then quickly grabs the parachute and his bag of stolen money. Sam jumps out, opens the parachute, and, while shouting at Bugs ("So long, sucker! Ha-ha! Ha-ha! Ha-ha! Ha-ha...Hoo-hoo...Hoo-hoo... Wooooh...."), the trailing off "hoo's" and "woooh's" come when he lands with the bank's bag of stolen money in his hands into a conveniently arriving police car full of officers. Bugs manages to stop the plane in midair (just a few feet from the ground) by pulling a lever (an ending reminiscent of that of Falling Hare). He is just thankful the plane comes with "air brakes" (a play on a different type of "air brakes").

== See also ==
- List of Bugs Bunny cartoons
- List of Yosemite Sam cartoons

Preceded by Rabbit's Kin	Bugs Bunny Cartoons; 1952	Succeeded by Forward March Hare
