= Rabbit Seasoning =

1952 American film by Chuck Jones

- Title card
- Directed by: Charles M. Jones
- Story by: Michael Maltese
- Starring: Mel Blanc; Arthur Q. Bryan
- Music by: Carl W. Stalling
- Animation by: Ken Harris; Lloyd Vaughan; Ben Washam; Richard Thompson; Abe Levitow; Harry Love
- Layouts by: Maurice Noble
- Backgrounds by: Philip de Guard
- Color process: Technicolor
- Production company: Warner Bros. Cartoons
- Distributed by: Warner Bros. Pictures; The Vitaphone Corporation
- Release date: September 20, 1952 (U.S.)
- Running time: 6:50
- Language: English

Rabbit Seasoning is a 1952 Warner Bros. Merrie Melodies cartoon directed by Chuck Jones. Released on September 20, 1952, the short stars Bugs Bunny, Daffy Duck and Elmer Fudd.

The short is the sequel to the previous year's Rabbit Fire, and the second in the "hunting trilogy" directed by Jones and written by Michael Maltese (the only major difference in format between them is that Rabbit Fire takes place during the spring, while Rabbit Seasoning takes place in the autumn. The third cartoon, Duck! Rabbit, Duck!, takes place in the winter). It is the first WB cartoon on which layout artist Maurice Noble received credit.

It is considered to be among Jones' best and most important films. In Jerry Beck's 1994 book The 50 Greatest Cartoons, Rabbit Seasoning is listed at number 30.

== Plot ==
In the forest, Daffy Duck places numerous signs proclaiming rabbit season to catch the attention of passersby, and leaves false rabbit tracks to ensnare Elmer Fudd into a misinformed hunting spree, since it is actually duck season. When Elmer fails to notice Bugs Bunny right in front of him, Daffy intervenes, urging Elmer to shoot the rabbit immediately. However, Bugs manages to trick Daffy into demanding to Elmer, "Shoot me now!", resulting in Daffy getting shot.

Several rounds of arguing ensue; Bugs continues to goad Daffy into verbal missteps, so that Daffy falls victim to his own arguments, enduring multiple shots from Elmer's gun. Daffy's frustration grows as he is repeatedly outwitted. In the end, Daffy, defeated, angrily approaches Bugs and tells him, "You're despicable."

== Reception ==
Animator J. J. Sedelmaier writes, "Of director Chuck Jones' three "Shoot 'im now!" cartoons, Rabbit Seasoning has always been my favorite. Bugs, Daffy, and Elmer are so tightly defined as the characters we all know and love that they're almost parodies of themselves. Even though this short is the second of the series, it's still fresh and tight. What's also amazing is how it doesn't feel like a cartoon that's almost sixty years old. The timing of the cuts — Daffy's expression when Elmer says to Bugs that he "hasn't even seen a wabbit yet" — and the miscellaneous, eccentric W. C. Fields-like sound effects that seem to ooze out of Daffy are still cool today."

== Cast ==
- Mel Blanc as Bugs Bunny and Daffy Duck
- Arthur Q. Bryan as Elmer Fudd (uncredited)

== Home media ==
VHS:

- Salute to Chuck Jones
- Warner Bros. Cartoons Golden Jubilee 24-Karat Collection: Elmer Fudd's Comedy Capers

Laserdisc:

- Bugs Bunny: Winner by a Hare

DVD:

- Looney Tunes Golden Collection: Volume 1
- Looney Tunes Platinum Collection: Volume 2

Preceded by Oily Hare	Bugs Bunny cartoons 1952	Succeeded by Rabbit's Kin
Preceded by Cracked Quack	Daffy Duck cartoons 1952	Succeeded by The Super Snooper
Preceded by Rabbit Fire	Elmer Fudd cartoons 1952	Succeeded by Upswept Hare
