= Room and Bird =

- Title card
- Directed by: I. Freleng
- Story by: Tedd Pierce; Warren Foster
- Starring: Mel Blanc; Bea Benaderet (unc.)
- Music by: Eugene Poddany; Milt Franklyn
- Animation by: Virgil Ross; Arthur Davis; Manuel Perez; Ken Champin
- Layouts by: Paul Julian
- Backgrounds by: Hawley Pratt
- Color process: Technicolor
- Production company: Warner Bros. Cartoons
- Distributed by: Warner Bros. Pictures; The Vitaphone Corporation
- Release date: June 2, 1951 (U.S.)
- Running time: 6:53
- Language: English

Room and Bird is a 1951 Warner Bros. Merrie Melodies animated short directed by Friz Freleng. The short was released on June 2, 1951, and stars Tweety and Sylvester. The title is a pun on room and board.

The film is set in a hotel which has a strict policy against the presence of pets. However, the respective owners of Tweety, Sylvester, and Hector have sneaked them inside, and the trio start chasing each other. Through an attempt of the doorman to evict Sylvester and Hector (two of the three he saw (off-screen)) through an intercom announcement, it is revealed that numerous pets were already living in the hotel in defiance of its policy.

This cartoon was most likely started by Tedd Pierce before management moved him to Robert McKimson's unit, while Warren Foster was moved to Freleng's unit, after Freleng's dissatisfaction at Pierce's stories, therefore completing the story.

A Merrie Melodies cartoon with a similar title would be released six years later, Zoom and Bored, starring Wile E. Coyote and the Road Runner.

== Plot ==
Two elderly ladies (one of which is Granny), the owners of Sylvester and Tweety, sneak their pets into a hotel where no pets are allowed. Sylvester, hearing Tweety's singing in the room next to his, writes a letter to the canary from his "Ardent Admirer". Tweety shortly discovers who his "admirer" is, and a chase ensues, which is cut short by the house detective, forcing both Tweety and Sylvester to run back into their rooms and the latter to disguise himself as a lady in bed screaming for help, which causes the detective to apologize and flee.

Sylvester then sneaks into Tweety's room and tries to get him in his cage; this backfires and he is knocked out by the spring-loaded cage and is dragged back to his room by Tweety. Sylvester then phones Tweety that his owner has a surprise for him; Tweety goes downstairs to receive it, but instead goes down Sylvester's throat, before returning alive with a mouse from the time of Thomas Jefferson. The chase then goes outside, and into the room of Hector the Bulldog.

Sylvester doesn't realize until after he has captured Tweety again that the dog is there. Another chase ensues, involving the dog, cat, and bird, which is also cut short by the detective, forcing the three to form a truce long enough to disguise themselves as an angry old lady with Tweety's head. The chase resumes again with the three animals running from room to room, making the detective suspicious. Finally, the detective (off-screen) sees Sylvester and Hector running, prompting him to finally head back to the lobby and make an announcement over the intercom evicting all pets. However, while it happens, it is revealed that numerous pets, along with several wild animals such as lions, kangaroos, and even an elephant, were already living in the hotel, and they all come stampeding over him while running out of the hotel.

Getting up, the detective dizzily says Tweety's catch phrase: "I tawt I taw a putty tat!" Tweety, popping out of hiding, delivers the final punchline by replying, "You did! You did! You taw a putty tat, a moo-moo tow, a big dowiwwa, a diddy-up hortey, and a wittle monkey!" (A busker's monkey was the last animal to run over the detective).

Preceded by Putty Tat Trouble	Tweety and Sylvester cartoons 1951	Succeeded by Tweety's S.O.S.
