= Yankee Doodle Bugs =

- Title card
- Directed by: I. Freleng
- Story by: Warren Foster
- Starring: Mel Blanc; Bea Benaderet (uncredited)
- Music by: Milt Franklyn
- Animation by: Arthur Davis; Manuel Perez; Virgil Ross
- Layouts by: Hawley Pratt
- Backgrounds by: Irv Wyner
- Color process: Technicolor
- Production company: Warner Bros. Cartoons
- Distributed by: Warner Bros. Pictures; Vitaphone
- Release date: August 28, 1954
- Running time: 7 minutes
- Country: United States
- Language: English

Yankee Doodle Bugs is a 1954 Warner Bros. Looney Tunes cartoon short, written by Warren Foster and directed by Friz Freleng. The short was released on August 28, 1954, and stars Bugs Bunny.

In the short, Bugs' nephew Clyde has trouble remembering important dates and events in American history in preparation for an exam, so Bugs offers to help, but recounts his version of American history. The cartoon's title is a humorous portmanteau of the American folk song "Yankee Doodle" and the word "doodlebug".

== Plot ==
Clyde is lying down on the floor doing his history homework for an exam at school, scratching down important dates in history and getting confused. After several moments, he exclaims: "I give up!". His uncle Bugs offers to help and proceeds to tell him how rabbits made American history.

In the first segment, in a trade of land with the Native American Indians, Bugs explains that Manhattan wasn't the bustling city you see today, but was rather filled with Indian teepees. Bugs explains that the Statue of Liberty was "... just a little goil (girl) at the time".

In the second segment, Bugs is interacting with Benjamin Franklin on the day that Franklin discovered electricity. "What's up, Benny?" Bugs asks. Ben states: "I'm trying to discover electricity," and asks Bugs if he can tend to his kite (with a key tied on it, naturally), and that he must get out "... ye first edition of The Saturday Evening Post", so he hands his kite string to Bugs to look after until he gets back. Bugs sees a storm cloud approach, lightning hits the kite and travels down the string and electrocutes him. Ben runs back, picks up Bugs who is flashing off and on like a lightbulb, exclaiming "I discovered electricity! I discovered electricity!" Bugs looks at the camera and says: "Heh ... He discovered electricity!"

In the third segment, Bugs explains to Clyde about the Boston Tea Party. The King is seen approaching a worker in the Royal Tea Warehouse in Boston. With a box of hardware tacks in hand, he orders the worker to "spread these tacks on the colonists' tea". When the worker explains: "But Your Majesty, these are carpet tacks", the King dumps the tacks all over the place in a fit of insanity and exclaims: "Well, they're tea tacks now!" and exits, laughing all the way. Bugs explains to Clyde that the colonists refused to drink their tea with tacks and that's how the Army was formed.

In the fourth segment, George Washington gets a letter in the mailbox, opens it and exclaims: "Gadzooks! I've been drafted!" He is then seen racing off on horseback to the Candy Shoppe, where he says to Martha Washington that she'll have to look after the candy stores alone, while he is off to fight the war. He then races off screen, yelling "Charge!"

In the fifth segment, Bugs is seen approaching Betsy Ross' home where she is sewing an American flag (with 13 red and white stripes and an unadorned blue field). He says: "Hiya Bets, how's the flag coming along?" She opens the flag displaying it and asks: "How's this, Mr. Bunny?" but Bugs makes a comment to Betsy that something is missing in the blue field. (Note the sign at the front gate that says: "Watch your step - Geo. Washington slipped here".) Pacing back and forth thinking hard about what can go in the blue field, Bugs unknowingly steps on a rake and the handle hits him in the head, forming a circle of stars around his head. He then looks at Betsy and asks: "Hey Betsy, does this give you an idea-r?" Betsy agrees, and starts sewing the stars into the blue space on the flag.

The sixth segment has the enemy storming Bunker Hill. Of course, a cannon is pointed right at them, and as soon as they get close enough, the cannon goes off surprising the enemy, who then turn around and walk in the opposite direction, their uniforms and weapons in tatters.

The battle at Valley Forge is the seventh segment, where Bugs explains the hardships endured, including 6 ft (1.8 m) of snow and frigid temperatures. An ice cream wagon is seen driving across the snow playing “Yankee Doodle”, and is immediately fired upon and explodes. The practically destroyed truck turns around in the opposite direction and rides off-scene.

The last segment opens with Bugs explaining "The enemy fleet was all bottled up", showing two ships in a bottle in a harbor, then shows Bugs steering a motor boat across the Delaware River with George Washington.

After Bugs tells Clyde all of these important historical events, the school bell is heard in the distance and Bugs rushes him off to school saying: "And don't forget what I told ya!" Later in the day, Clyde returns home with a sour look and Bugs asks him how he performed in the history exam. Clyde puts a dunce cap on his head and asks: "Does THIS answer your question?!", implying his regret for having listened to Bugs.

== Music ==
- "Yankee Doodle", traditional
- "The Red, White and Blue", aka "Columbia, the Gem of the Ocean"
- "The Girl I Left Behind Me", traditional
- "You're a Horse's Ass", traditional

== See also ==
- List of films about the American Revolution

Preceded by Bewitched Bunny	Bugs Bunny Cartoons; 1954	Succeeded by Baby Buggy Bunny
