= Rabbit Fire =

1951 American animated short film directed by Chuck Jones

- Lobby card
- Directed by: Charles M. Jones
- Story by: Michael Maltese
- Starring: Mel Blanc; Arthur Q. Bryan
- Music by: Carl W. Stalling
- Animation by: Ken Harris; Phil Monroe; Lloyd Vaughan; Ben Washam
- Layouts by: Robert Gribbroek
- Backgrounds by: Philip de Guard
- Color process: Technicolor
- Production company: Warner Bros. Cartoons
- Distributed by: Warner Bros. Pictures; The Vitaphone Corporation
- Release date: May 19, 1951 (U.S.)
- Running time: 7:33
- Language: English

Rabbit Fire is a 1951 Looney Tunes cartoon starring Bugs Bunny, Daffy Duck, and Elmer Fudd. Directed by Chuck Jones and written by Michael Maltese, the cartoon is the first in Jones' "hunting trilogy"—the other two cartoons following it being Rabbit Seasoning and Duck! Rabbit, Duck! It is also the first cartoon to feature a feud between Bugs, Daffy and Elmer. Produced by Warner Bros. Cartoons, the short was released to theaters on May 19, 1951 by Warner Bros. Pictures and is often considered among Jones' best and most important films.

The film marks a significant shift in Daffy's personality, going from being the insane "screwball" character who (like Bugs) overwhelmed his adversaries, to a much more flawed individual, full of greed and vanity and desire for attention under the spotlight. This personality change, which was previously explored by Jones in You Were Never Duckier and Daffy Dilly, and even earlier in Friz Freleng's You Ought to Be in Pictures, was done in order for Daffy to better serve as Bugs' foil. This was fueled by Bugs' popularity surpassing Daffy's quickly over the years, increasing the desire of the studio's animators to pair the two together. Since then, Daffy's earlier screwball personality has been revisited in newer Looney Tunes media such as Looney Tunes Cartoons.

== Plot ==
Daffy Duck orchestrates a ruse to lure Elmer Fudd to Bugs Bunny's burrow, initiating a cycle of mistaken identity. Initially, Daffy incites Elmer to target Bugs under the false pretense of rabbit season, only for Bugs to counter that it is duck season. Daffy, indignant, engages in a verbal duel with Bugs, unwittingly validating Bugs' assertions and prompting Elmer to fire upon him repeatedly. Afterwards, Daffy cunningly disguises himself as Bugs, leading to Bugs trying the same trick to reverse the situation.

When Elmer begins hunting them both, Bugs and Daffy eventually join forces to try and deceive him, a plan which fails when Elmer sees through their disguises. Tensions escalate, prompting a final confrontation where Bugs and Daffy alternately rip "Rabbit Season" and "Duck Season" signs off a tree, only to reveal an "Elmer Season" poster underneath. With Elmer now in the crosshairs and the tables turned, Bugs and Daffy assume the role of hunters and stalk Elmer with shotguns in hand.

== Voice cast ==
- Mel Blanc as Bugs Bunny, Daffy Duck, and Elephant
- Arthur Q. Bryan as Elmer Fudd (uncredited)

== Reception ==
Rabbit Fire is generally considered among Chuck Jones and Michael Maltese's best works, and is noted for its use of dialogue gags in lieu of the physical gags more typical in animation. Besides the two sequels to this film, a number of other Jones shorts, including Beanstalk Bunny and Ali Baba Bunny, paired quick-witted Bugs and self-serving Daffy with (or rather against) each other.

In this short, Mel Blanc showcased his ability to make one character imitate another character's voice, in this case, Daffy Duck impersonating Bugs Bunny and vice versa. Actor and voice actor Hank Azaria observed that this is almost impossible; he and other members of the cast of The Simpsons once tried, but none of them could do it.

The "rabbit season/duck season" argument from this short became one of the references in the Looney Tunes franchise to have been analyzed both by scholars and by Jones himself (although this gag was actually used by Daffy against Porky six years earlier in the cartoon Duck Soup to Nuts). According to an essay by Darragh O'Donoghue, Rabbit Fire "stands in close relation to human experience, striving and generally failing to grasp an elusive quarry or goal." Richard Thompson said that in the film, there is "the clearest definition of character roles: Elmer never knows what's going on; Bugs always knows what's going on and is in control of things; Daffy is bright enough to understand how to be in control, but never quite makes it." Jones himself refers to Rabbit Fire as a "corner" picture, among his works that, "as in turning a corner in a strange city, reveal new and enchanting vistas."

The short earned an honorable mention for animation historian Jerry Beck's list of The Fifty Greatest Cartoons: As Selected by 1000 Animation Professionals. Its 1952 sequel, Rabbit Seasoning, made the actual list at number 30. The style, setup, and plot of Rabbit Fire were adapted into the opening sequence of Warner Bros.' 2003 film Looney Tunes: Back in Action.

Rabbit Fire is one of several shorts where Bugs Bunny dresses in drag to trick his enemies. Multiple scholars analyze Rabbit Fire to argue that Bugs Bunny's drag appearances demonstrate the cultural construction of gender, as well as animation's ability to expose "the constructedness of gender and sexuality through parodic redeployment".

== Production details ==
- In two interviews conducted years after this cartoon was first released, director Chuck Jones fondly recalled voice artist Mel Blanc improvising hilariously as Daffy when he was trying to think of another word besides "despicable". However, in the finished film, only the words from the original dialogue script actually appear. Historians believe that Blanc did indeed improvise, as Jones remembered, but then Jones had decided instead to use what was originally written.
- Rabbit Fire and its two sequels often have two characters in the same frame for some length of time – an atypical aspect of the "Hunting" trilogy. In order to keep budgets under control, most Warner Bros. cartoons would cut back and forth between characters, rather than put two or more in the same shot, or, at least, both characters might be in the same shot, but only one would actually be animated.
- Although the film is introduced by the Looney Tunes music "The Merry-Go-Round Broke Down", the opening card indicates a Merrie Melodies "Blue Ribbon" release from 1960, and the end card is Merrie Melodies, replacing the original orange-red Looney Tunes title sequences.
- Rabbit Fire marked the first cartoon where Bugs and Daffy starred and appeared together. While Bugs had made a cameo in Porky Pig's Feat (which co-starred Daffy and Porky Pig), this was the first where both were the stars.
- Although this is the first cartoon with Daffy's selfish side replacing his screwball side, he still hollers "hoo-hoo", a catchphrase from his screwball personality.
- The title of this short is a pun on "rapid fire".

== Home media ==
This cartoon is available on the Looney Tunes Golden Collection: Volume 1, Disc 2, The Essential Bugs Bunny, Disc 1, the Looney Tunes Platinum Collection: Volume 2, Disc 2, and the Bugs Bunny 80th Anniversary Collection, Disc 2.

| Preceded by The Fair-Haired Hare | Bugs Bunny cartoons 1951 | Succeeded by French Rarebit |
| Preceded by The Ducksters | Daffy Duck cartoons 1951 | Succeeded by Drip-Along Daffy |
| Preceded by Rabbit of Seville | Elmer Fudd cartoons 1951 | Succeeded by Rabbit Seasoning |
