= Big Top Bunny =

1951 film by Robert McKimson

- Lobby card
- Directed by: Robert McKimson
- Story by: Tedd Pierce
- Starring: Mel Blanc
- Music by: Carl Stalling
- Animation by: Charles McKimson; Rod Scribner; Phil DeLara; Bob Wickersham; Herman Cohen (uncredited)
- Layouts by: Peter Alvarado
- Backgrounds by: Richard H. Thomas
- Color process: Technicolor
- Production company: Warner Bros. Cartoons
- Distributed by: Warner Bros. Pictures; The Vitaphone Corporation
- Release date: December 1, 1951
- Running time: 7:09
- Country: United States
- Language: English

Big Top Bunny is a 1951 Warner Bros. Merrie Melodies theatrical cartoon short directed by Robert McKimson and written by Tedd Pierce. The cartoon was released on December 1, 1951, and stars Bugs Bunny.

The cartoon is available on Disc 1 in the Looney Tunes Golden Collection: Volume 1.

== Plot ==
At Colonel Korny's World Famous Circus, Bruno the "Slobokian Acrobatic Bear" - who, evidenced by his accent, is clearly Russian - is the star of the show. But when the Colonel gets a phone call about Bugs Bunny's talents, he agrees to put him on stage partnered with Bruno - a decision for which Bruno shows his disgust by spitting into a corner.

When Bugs is introduced along with Bruno, the bear can't help but smack Bugs around a little. Bruno tries to get the better of Bugs - either by placing an anvil on top of a series of targets so Bugs can hit his head, or by not catching Bugs during a trapeze act. However, Bugs soon starts getting the better of Bruno, which includes turning the tables on the bear by letting him fall from the trapeze into the band section (twice).

After telling Bruno he's "too clumsy", Bugs starts playing up the idea that he's going solo and will be the star of the show; to prove it, he'll take a 200-foot dive into a tank of water. Bugs jumps onto a platform and hikes himself to that height. Bruno gets on an adjacent platform and, after reaching Bugs' position, declares that he will take a 300-foot dive into a bucket of water. This diving challenge reaches higher heights into smaller containers of water (a damp sponge) until finally, Bruno comes up with the challenge of diving 1,000 feet (305 m) off the platform into a block of cement ("On my head, yet!"). Bugs accepts the challenge and starts to do the stunt, but Bruno forces his way into going first. Bruno lands and is flattened on the cement block. When the dazed bear straightens up a bit, Bugs leads him toward what looks like the gangplank of a cruise ship, telling him that he's going on a 'trip'. When Bruno is situated, Bugs cuts a rope and starts a series of thoroughly timed "accidents" that begins with Bruno flying across the tent. He then gets whacked around by various acrobats of the circus until he is taken by a trick bicycle into the mouth of a cannon, which Bugs uses to shoot the bear out of the tent and Bugs turned to the camera and said. "Well, that's one way to wind this up with a bang." Then he laughs as the screen irises out.

== In other media ==
A 3-D version of this cartoon was produced in 1972 by General Aniline & Film (GAF) for its View-Master line, spread out over three reels (21 images).

Preceded by Ballot Box Bunny	Bugs Bunny Cartoons; 1951	Succeeded by Operation: Rabbit
