= Jorge Maestro =

Argentine screenwriter (1951–2025)

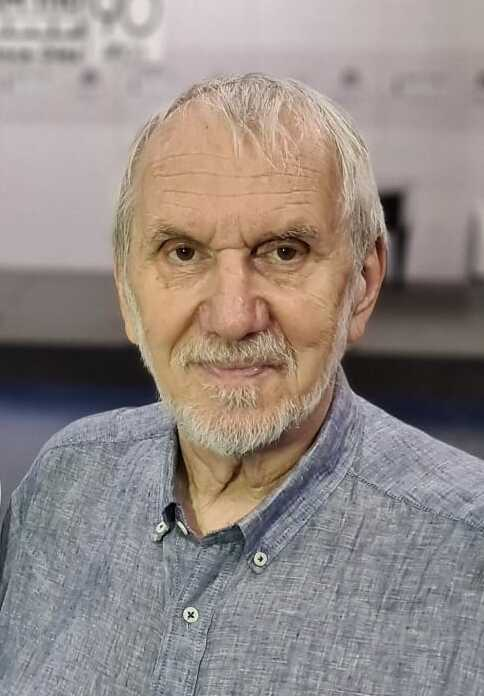
Jorge Maestro

Jorge Leonardo Mordkowicz (September 13, 1951 – August 18, 2025), better known as Jorge Maestro, was an Argentine screenwriter and playwright.

== Life and career ==
Mordkowicz was born in Buenos Aires on September 13, 1951. He trained in theatre direction and acting with Professor Augusto Fernandes. He worked with Sergio Vainman for a number of years; between 1980 and 1997 they wrote the scripts for Zona de riesgo, Montaña rusa, Clave de sol, Amigovios, La banda del Golden Rocket, Como pan caliente, Hombre de mar, Gerente de familia and Los machos, among other programs. In 2004 he was director of fiction content at América TV, holding the position for only one year, and then he was director of the department of soap opera scriptwriters at Canal 13 in Chile from 2005-2006. He was a member of the board of directors of Argentores.

For most of his career as a screenwriter he specialized in telenovelas. The films he wrote or co-wrote generally had high budgets by the standards of Argentine cinema.

Maestro died on August 18, 2025, at the age of 73.
