= Gordon & Paddy =

Gordon And Paddy
- Directed by: Linda Hambäck
- Written by: Ulf Nilsson (author); Jan Vierth (screenplay)
- Produced by: Linda Hambäck; Lina Jonsson
- Starring: Stellan Skarsgård; Melinda Kinnaman; Felix Herngren
- Cinematography: Gabriel Mkrttchian
- Music by: Martin Landquist
- Production company: LEE Film
- Distributed by: New Europe Film Sales
- Release dates: 22 December 2017 (Sweden); 12 February 2018 (Berlinale)
- Running time: 62 minutes
- Country: Sweden

Gordon & Paddy is a 2017 Swedish animated comedy-drama film directed by Linda Hambäck. The film is an adaptation of the book written by Ulf Nilsson and illustrated by Gitte Spee. The film was selected to be screened in the Generation Kplus section at the 68th Berlin International Film Festival. The film was released in Sweden on 22 December 2017, starring the voices of Stellan Skarsgård, Melinda Kinnaman and Felix Herngren for the Swedish version.

== Plot ==
The forest's police chief Gordon is about to retire and he needs to find a new assistant. Paddy, a clever mouse with a great sense of smell seems to be the right candidate. Together they have to solve Gordon's last case – the mystery of squirrel's missing nuts. Could it be the fox that took them? Gordon and Paddy will soon find out.

== Cast ==
Character	Swedish (voice)	English (voice)
Gordon	Stellan Skarsgård	/
Paddy	Melinda Kinnaman	/
Valdermar	Felix Herngren	/
