= Canned Feud =

- Title card
- Directed by: I. Freleng
- Story by: Warren Foster; Cal Howard
- Starring: Mel Blanc
- Music by: Carl Stalling
- Animation by: Virgil Ross; Ken Champin; Arthur Davis; Manuel Perez; John Carey; Assisted by: Jack Farren
- Layouts by: Hawley Pratt
- Backgrounds by: Paul Julian
- Color process: Technicolor
- Production company: Warner Bros. Cartoons
- Distributed by: Warner Bros. Pictures; The Vitaphone Corporation
- Release date: February 3, 1951 (U.S.)
- Running time: 7:24
- Country: United States
- Language: English

Canned Feud is a 1951 Warner Bros. Looney Tunes animated short directed by Friz Freleng. The short was released on February 3, 1951, and stars Sylvester.

In the film, Sylvester finds himself trapped within a house for two weeks. The only available food is canned. The only can opener is in the possession of a mouse, who uses this prize possession to taunt and torment Sylvester.

== Plot ==
Sylvester's owners, Sam and Violet, go on vacation to California and forget to put him out. Sylvester finds himself in an empty house, without food or milk, for two weeks. In the cupboard, however, he finds some canned tuna and other fish; when he searches for a can opener, he discovers that it has been stolen by a mouse who refuses to give it to him. After several failed attempts to open the tuna without a can opener and obtain the tool, Sylvester decides to blow up the mouse's hole. This way, he finally manages to get the can opener, but when he returns to the cupboard, he discovers that the mouse has locked it with a padlock to which he has the key, and he faints.

== Reception ==
Linda Simensky writes, "This cartoon, which stars Sylvester the Cat, is a showcase of masterful comic timing, pantomime acting and sustained hysteria. Thanks to the limited dialogue and simple narrative, Friz Freleng focuses on letting Sylvester act, react, and completely panic at the thought of no food for two weeks."

== Voice cast ==
- Mel Blanc as Sylvester, Mouse's Whistle, Sam
- Marian Richman as Violet (uncredited)

== Home media ==
Canned Feud was released on DVD in 2003 as part of Looney Tunes Golden Collection: Volume 1 and on Blu-ray in 2012 as part of Looney Tunes Platinum Collection: Volume 2.
