= The Wearing of the Grin =

1951 animated comedy film by Chuck Jones

- Title card
- Directed by: Charles M. Jones
- Story by: Michael Maltese
- Starring: Mel Blanc
- Music by: Eugene Poddany; Milt Franklyn
- Animation by: Ben Washam; Lloyd Vaughan; Ken Harris; Phil Monroe
- Layouts by: Robert Gribbroek
- Backgrounds by: Philip De Guard
- Color process: Technicolor
- Production company: Warner Bros. Cartoons
- Distributed by: Warner Bros. Pictures
- Release date: July 14, 1951 (U.S.)
- Running time: 7:28
- Country: United States
- Language: English

The Wearing of the Grin is a 1951 Warner Bros. Looney Tunes cartoon directed by Chuck Jones and written by Michael Maltese. The short was released on July 14, 1951, and stars Porky Pig. The title is a pun on the Irish song "The Wearing of the Green".

== Plot ==
On a rainy stormy night while traveling through rural Ireland on his way to Dublin, Porky Pig asks for overnight lodgings at a nearby castle, but its caretaker, Seamus O'Toole, tells him that no one inhabits the place but himself and the leprechauns. Porky dismisses the remark, tells the caretaker to "cut out this nonsense and take my bags to a room", and slams the front door, causing a mace above to fall. It strikes Porky on the head and knocks him unconscious. At that point, O'Toole is revealed to be a pair of leprechauns disguised as a human being. O'Pat, the first one, is very calm while O'Mike, the second one, quickly becomes frantic with fear that Porky is after their pot of gold. O'Pat, being the "Chief Leprechaun" in their area, convinces his partner that he knows how to deal with Porky.

When Porky wakes up, he is helped to a room by the "reunited" caretaker who, during the short trip to the room, gets accidentally divided in two again when O'Pat walks along the stone railing of the stairs and goes off to the left as Porky and O'Mike go right. Porky, quite tired out by "all this excitement" doesn't notice the problem with his host, even handing him his coat, which O'Mike takes, and Porky tells him to just put the bags anywhere. Moving toward the bed, he meets O'Toole who asks him if he has seen his other half. Without thinking, he tells him it's by the door, O'Pat moves out of frame, and then it registers with Porky that he is in the presence of leprechauns. Terrified, he hides in the bed, which is a trap door. The bed closes into the wall and Porky is dropped down a winding shaft until he lands in a witness chair in a leprechaun courtroom ("The Leprechaun Court of Shaughnessy Township, County of Rourke O'Houlihan"). There, the leprechauns charge and convict their archenemy of trying to steal the pot of gold (despite having no substantial evidence against him); they sentence Porky to the wearing of the Green Shoes.

At first, Porky appreciates the Green Shoes as nice shoes, but soon he realizes that these shoes are cursed, as he begins a frantic Irish jig, which makes the leprechauns laugh at him. The shoes will not stop dancing; even when he removes them, they chase him and return themselves to his feet. He is "danced" through an Irish dreamscape until he falls to his apparent death in a boiling pot of gold. At this point, he wakes up, in a puddle of water, on the spot where he fell after being hit by the mace. O'Toole is standing over him with an empty bucket, implying he has dumped water over Porky to revive him. Porky screams, remembering that the caretaker is actually the leprechaun, and leaps up to one of the posts that had been holding the mace. The caretaker tries to convince Porky that nothing has been amiss. Porky, frightened and disoriented, grabs his bags and runs away from the castle and into the distance stating he's late for an appointment with his psychiatrist. O'Toole watches him run, smoking his upside-down pipe, and sporting a mischievous smile, shakes hands with himself (a hand that emerges from his trousers, clearly O'Mike) over a shamrock-shaped iris out.

== Home media ==
The Wearing of the Grin is available on the Looney Tunes Golden Collection: Volume 1 DVD box-set, supplemented with an audio commentary by animation historian Michael Barrier. It was re-edited in Porky's Nightmares, and was the first segment to appear in the movie.

== See also ==
- Looney Tunes
- Looney Tunes and Merrie Melodies filmography (1950–1959)
- The Red Shoes (fairy tale)
