= Ballot Box Bunny =

1951 film by Friz Freleng

- Title card
- Directed by: I. Freleng
- Story by: Warren Foster
- Starring: Mel Blanc
- Music by: Carl Stalling
- Animation by: Ken Champin; Virgil Ross; Arthur Davis; Manuel Perez
- Layouts by: Hawley Pratt
- Backgrounds by: Paul Julian
- Color process: Technicolor
- Production company: Warner Bros. Cartoons
- Distributed by: Warner Bros. Pictures; The Vitaphone Corporation
- Release date: October 6, 1951
- Running time: 7 minutes 35 seconds
- Country: United States
- Language: English

Ballot Box Bunny is a 1951 Warner Bros. Merrie Melodies theatrical cartoon short directed by Friz Freleng and written by Warren Foster. The cartoon was released on October 6, 1951, and features Bugs Bunny and Yosemite Sam.

The two main characters are depicted as rival candidates in elections for the position of mayor in a small town.

== Plot ==
Yosemite Sam is running for mayor of a small town, offering such empty promises as: "There's enough fresh air and sunshine in this great country of ours for everybody – and I'll see to it, that you'll get your share!". Bugs Bunny is underneath the podium drinking carrot juice when Sam makes a pledge to make good on his previous promise "to rid this country of every last rabbit" if elected. Bugs is horrified and then decides he needs to fight Sam by running against him for mayor. Both of them proceed to engage in various stereotypical election ploys.

Bugs tries to win the townspeople over with Theodore Roosevelt's famous "I speak softly, but I carry a BIG stick!" quote, even dressing up like Roosevelt. However, Sam declares "I speak LOUD and I carry a BIGGER stick, and I use it too!" and does so on Bugs. Sam starts kissing babies (one of whom reacts by spitting the kiss off); he goes to kiss disguised Bugs, who plants one on Sam first then yells that "a bad man bit my wittle nose" (imitating Red Skelton's "Mean Widdle Kid"), attracting some women of the town who chastise Sam and rough him up as punishment.

Sam then steals Bugs' cigar stand at gunpoint. Bugs switches his free "SMELLO" cigars for five-cent ATOM explosive ones. Sam lights one for a voter, and it immediately explodes, resulting in Sam receiving a solid punch in the face.

Sam then sends a boxful of "assorted" picnic ants to steal the food from Bugs' free picnic. As they march by carrying the food, Bugs inserts a stick of dynamite inside a watermelon. Sam is taking the food from the ants and packing it into a sack; he stuffs the watermelon in and cheerfully scurries behind a wall. After the explosion blows up the sack, everything in it, and much of Sam's clothing and hair, Sam emerges saying, "I hate that rabbit!"

Next, he rigs a cannon at the front door of Bugs' headquarters and greets Bugs with friendship at the back door; he knocks his boot heel against the floor to fool Bugs into going to answer the front door. The plan backfires when Bugs pretends that the person at the door is a girl from "Saint Louie" there to see Sam. Sam believes it is an old flame, Emma, and rushes to greet her, triggering the cannon.

Sam then challenges Bugs, asking him if he can play the piano, and Bugs accepts the challenge; Sam rigs explosives in the piano, attached to a specific key, and presents the piano to Bugs to play "Those Endearing Young Charms" (a gag recycled from a Private Snafu short), but Bugs manages to avoid the trap by misplaying the tune on purpose, avoiding the rigged key. A frustrated Sam finally takes over and plays it correctly, falling for his own trap.

A quick chase through the streets leads the pair to the parade for the newly elected mayor. But as it turns out, a literal "dark horse" candidate, a chestnut-colored mare, stepped in and won. The car bears a sign reading "Our New Mare". Bugs suggests a game of Russian Roulette and hands Sam a revolver. Sam agrees, points the gun at his head, closes his eyes and pulls the trigger; he gets the click of an empty chamber. He then hands the gun to Bugs, who points the gun at his head, closes his eyes, and pulls the trigger as the "camera" irises into black in the center of the screen, to the sound of a gunshot. An iris opens up on Bugs to the left, showing that he had actually ducked immediately before he fired and now holds a smoking gun. He proclaims, "I missed!" The right side of the screen irises open to reveal a scorched, hatless Sam shot in the head by Bugs' wayward blast, and Sam grumbles: "I hate that rabbit!"

== Notes ==
- The statue contains a list of crew members from the film. It reads, "Pro Patria 1865: Batchelder, Champin, Farren, Julian, Nicholson, Perez, Pratt and Ross."
- Building names to look out for: Ross & Co, Josiah Freep, Frizby, M. Perez, P. Julian Yard Tools.

== Home media ==
Ballot Box Bunny is available, uncut, with the ending restored, on Looney Tunes Golden Collection: Volume 1, Disc 1, and on Looney Tunes Collector's Vault: Volume 3, Disc 2.

== See also ==
- List of Bugs Bunny cartoons
- List of Yosemite Sam cartoons

Preceded by His Hare-Raising Tale	Bugs Bunny Cartoons; 1951	Succeeded by Big Top Bunny
