= French Rarebit =

1951 film by Robert McKimson

- Title card
- Directed by: Robert McKimson
- Story by: Tedd Pierce
- Starring: Mel Blanc (all other voices); Tedd Pierce (Louis)
- Music by: Eugene Poddany; Milt Franklyn
- Animation by: Phil DeLara; Emery Hawkins; Charles McKimson; Rod Scribner
- Layouts by: Cornett Wood
- Backgrounds by: Richard H. Thomas
- Color process: Technicolor
- Production company: Warner Bros. Cartoons
- Distributed by: Warner Bros. Pictures
- Release date: June 30, 1951
- Running time: 7 minutes (one reel)
- Language: English

French Rarebit is a 1951 Warner Bros. Merrie Melodies animated short, directed by Robert McKimson and written by Tedd Pierce. Released June 30, 1951, the cartoon features Bugs Bunny. The title is a play on "Welsh rarebit", which is also known as "Welsh rabbit".

== Plot ==
In Paris, France, Bugs Bunny finds himself amidst a culinary quandary after a delivery mishap lands him in the bustling streets. Two competing French chefs, Louis and François, both set their sights on turning Bugs into a gourmet delicacy for their respective restaurants.

Amidst the chaos of their culinary rivalry, Bugs cleverly manipulates the situation to his advantage, inciting a humorous conflict between the chefs as they vie for ownership of the apparently unwitting rabbit. Employing wit and cunning, Bugs navigates the escalating fracas with ease, ultimately orchestrating a comical showdown in the kitchen.

As Bugs cunningly evades his would-be captors, he playfully suggests tantalizing recipes and culinary techniques, leaving the chefs bewildered and bemused. In a final act of culinary whimsy, Bugs concocts a daring plan to outwit the chefs, culminating in a comedic explosion that leaves both Louis and François unscathed but humbled.

Amidst the chaos and laughter, Bugs delivers his trademark quip, expressing a preference for a simpler fare than the culinary escapades of Parisian cuisine.

== Home media ==
The short can be found (uncut) on the Looney Tunes Golden Collection: Volume 2. This short was also included as a bonus feature on the Blu-ray release of Gay Purr-ee.

Preceded by Rabbit Fire	Bugs Bunny Cartoons; 1951	Succeeded by His Hare-Raising Tale
