= The Ducksters =

1950 Looney Tunes short by Chuck Jones

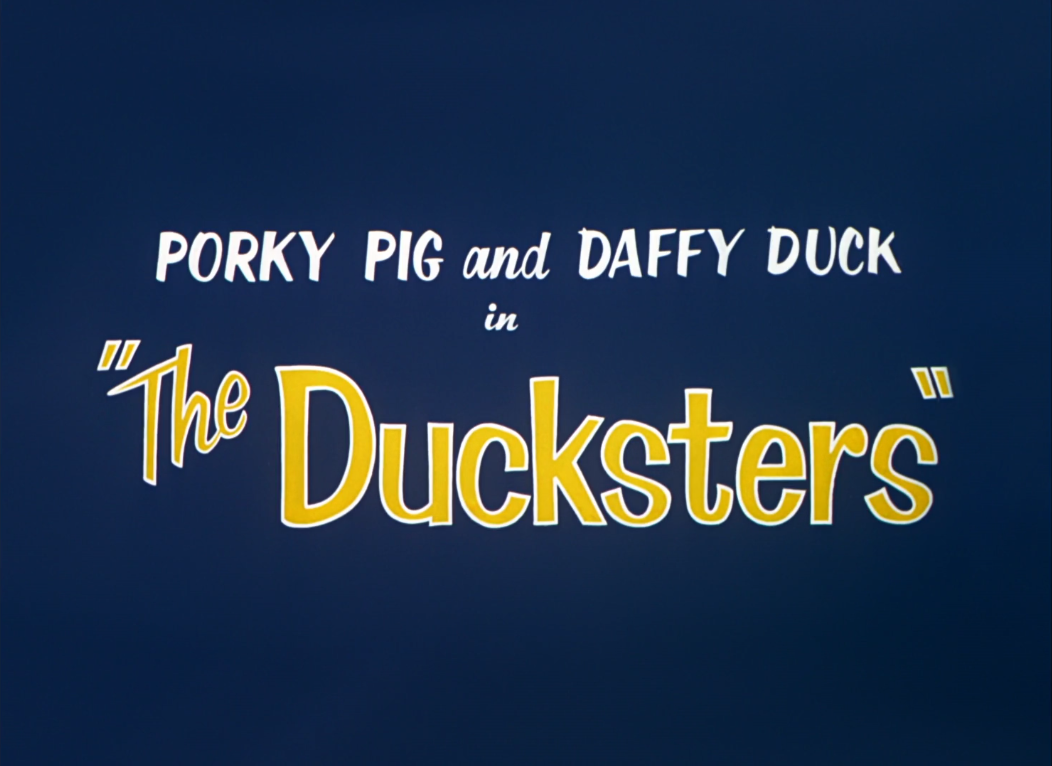
- Title card
- Directed by: Charles M. Jones
- Story by: Michael Maltese
- Starring: Mel Blanc
- Music by: Carl Stalling
- Animation by: Lloyd Vaughan; Ken Harris; Phil Monroe; Ben Washam
- Layouts by: Robert Gribbroek
- Backgrounds by: Peter Alvarado
- Color process: Technicolor
- Production company: Warner Bros. Cartoons
- Distributed by: Warner Bros. Pictures; The Vitaphone Corporation
- Release date: September 2, 1950
- Running time: 7:21
- Language: English

The Ducksters is a 1950 Warner Bros. Looney Tunes theatrical cartoon short, directed by Chuck Jones and written by Michael Maltese. The cartoon was released on September 2, 1950, and stars Daffy Duck and Porky Pig. The title is a pun on the 1947 film The Hucksters, and the cartoon is a parody largely based on the popular game and quiz show Truth or Consequences.

== Plot ==
Porky Pig finds himself as a contestant on a radio quiz show hosted by Daffy called Truth or AAAAHHH!! which, according to Daffy is sponsored by "the Eagle Hand Laundry - if your eagle's hands are dirty, we'll wash 'em clean!". On the show, Porky is faced with answering ridiculously impossible questions in limited time, only to endure torturous penalties for failing or answering incorrectly.

Porky endures various punishments, including being threatened by a buzz saw, flattened by the Rock of Gibraltar, and blown up with dynamite. Despite Daffy's taunts, Porky refuses to give up until he is subjected to one final challenge: identifying "Miss Shush", who turns out to be a ferocious gorilla. As Porky comes out battered and in a rage, Daffy declares him the winner of the jackpot prize: $26,000,000.03.

Now in possession of the money, Porky phones the owner of the Ajax Broadcasting Company, the radio network broadcasting the show, and quickly buys it for the price of $26,000,000.03, becoming Daffy's new boss. Porky seeks retribution by subjecting Daffy to a rapid montage of the same penalties he was forced to suffer. The cartoon ends as Daffy is ultimately confronted with the same buzz saw Porky encountered at the beginning of the short, amusingly appealing to the audience for medical assistance.

== Cast ==
Mel Blanc portrays all voices in this short, including Daffy Duck, Porky Pig and the audience member.

== Production details ==
The cartoon's title is a play on The Hucksters, a satirical novel about the advertising business that was made into a 1947 live-action film starring Clark Gable.

"Eagle Hand Laundry", the business supposedly sponsoring Daffy's radio show, was at the time the name of an actual hand laundry in Brooklyn.

The quiz show, named Truth or AAAAHHH!!, is a play on the 1940s radio quiz program Truth or Consequences. Daffy Duck's line "Aren't we gruesome??" was lifted from Ralph Edwards' expression, "Aren't we devils??", which he often used while hosting Truth or Consequences. His final line, "Have you got a doctor in the balcony, lady?!" is a play on another radio quiz show, Dr. I.Q.. The announcer on that show would note "I have a lady in the balcony, doctor." when introducing a new contestant.

One can tell that the cartoon was made before Alaska and Hawaii became states because one of the quiz questions was to name all 48 states. Both Alaska and Hawaii became states in 1959, and pop culture since then has used the term "50 states"

In Coyote vs. Acme, Daffy's scream is reused for Bugs Bunny screaming.
