= Baseball Bugs =

1946 film by Friz Freleng

- Directed by: I. Freleng
- Story by: Michael Maltese
- Starring: Mel Blanc; Frank Graham (uncredited); Tedd Pierce (uncredited); Bea Benaderet (uncredited)
- Music by: Carl W. Stalling
- Animation by: Manuel Perez; Ken Champin; Virgil Ross; Gerry Chiniquy
- Layouts by: Hawley Pratt
- Backgrounds by: Paul Julian
- Color process: Technicolor
- Production company: Warner Bros. Cartoons
- Distributed by: Warner Bros. Pictures
- Release date: February 2, 1946
- Running time: 7:36
- Language: English

Baseball Bugs is a 1946 Warner Bros. Looney Tunes theatrical animated cartoon directed by Friz Freleng. The short was released on February 2, 1946, and stars Bugs Bunny.

== Plot ==
A baseball game takes place at the Polo Grounds in New York City, featuring the Gas-House Gorillas and the Tea Totallers. The former, a burly and intimidating team reminiscent of the real-life Gashouse Gang, dominates the elderly players of the home team and intimidates the umpire with their aggressive play. Bugs Bunny, observing from his burrow in the outfield, becomes incensed by the unfair tactics of the Gorillas and challenges them. The Gorillas suddenly surround him and accept the challenge.

Forced to play all positions against the Gorillas, Bugs employs clever strategies to level the playing field. Despite initial setbacks, Bugs showcases his athleticism and wit, thwarting the Gorillas' attempts to maintain their dominance. Through comedic antics and resourcefulness, Bugs manages to score runs and outsmart his opponents, much to their chagrin.

As the game progresses, Bugs finds himself in a decisive moment in the final inning, with the Gorillas closing in on victory. In a dramatic climax, Bugs embarks on a daring pursuit to retrieve a home run ball launched out of the stadium. With ingenuity and determination, Bugs ultimately secures the ball atop the Umpire State Building, ensuring victory for his team with the umpire following him to declare the out and the Statue of Liberty starts talking in support of that call to make the decision final.

== Voice cast ==
- Mel Blanc as Bugs Bunny, Tea Totaller, Umpire, Gas-House Gorilla, Second Sportscaster
- Frank Graham as Sportscaster, Lead Gas-House Gorilla
- Tedd Pierce as First Sportscaster
- Bea Benaderet as Statue of Liberty

== Production notes ==
Baseball Bugs, directed by Friz Freleng and written by Michael Maltese, features voice characterizations by Mel Blanc, along with additional uncredited performances by Bea Benaderet, Frank Graham, and Tedd Pierce. The title serves as a double entendre, playing on the term "Bugs" as both a nickname for eccentric individuals and a nod to sports fandom. This cartoon also draws inspiration from a previous Columbia Pictures production, Football Bugs, released in 1936.

== Reception ==
According to animation historian Michael Barrier, there was a noticeable shift in the portrayal of Bugs Bunny's adversaries before and after World War II. Prior to the war, his foes were often portrayed as bumbling fools whom Bugs held in disdain. However, in films directed by Freleng and others post-war, the antagonists became more formidable and menacing. This change added an extra layer of satisfaction to Bugs' clever maneuvers and triumphs. In Baseball Bugs specifically, the antagonists take the form of the Gas-House Gorillas. "A whole team of interchangeable ... hulking, blue-jawed, cigar chewing monsters".

Bugs launches a fastball from the pitcher's mound, accelerates past it, and moves in position at home plate to catch it. This is a demonstration of cartoon physics, since such acceleration would be impossible in real life.

== Home media ==
VHS:

- Cartoon Moviestars Bugs! (1988)
- Looney Tunes: The Collectors Edition Volume 9, A Looney Life (1999; 1995 U.S. Turner Dubbed Version)

LaserDisc:

- Cartoon Moviestars: Bugs! and Elmer! (1988)
- The Golden Age of Looney Tunes, Volume 3, Side 7 (1992)

DVD:

- Looney Tunes Golden Collection: Volume 1, Disc One (2003)
- The Essential Bugs Bunny, Disc 1 (2010)
- Looney Tunes Platinum Collection: Volume 1, Disc 1 (2011)
- Looney Tunes Bugs Bunny Golden Carrot Collection, Disc One (2020)

Blu-ray:

- Looney Tunes Platinum Collection: Volume 1, Disc 1 (2011)
- Looney Tunes Showcase: Volume 1 (2012)
- Bugs Bunny 80th Anniversary Collection, Disc 1 (2020)

== See also ==
- Bugs Bunny filmography
- List of baseball films
- Looney Tunes and Merrie Melodies filmography (1940–1949)

== Sources ==
- Barrier, Michael (1999), "What's Up, Warner Bros., 1945–1953", Hollywood Cartoons : American Animation in Its Golden Age, Oxford University Press, ISBN 978-0198020790
- Van Riper, A. Bowdoin (2002). "Acceleration". Science in Popular Culture: A Reference Guide. Greenwood Publishing Group. ISBN 978-0313318221.

Preceded by Hare Tonic	Bugs Bunny Cartoons; 1946	Succeeded by Hare Remover
