= Haredevil Hare =

1948 animated short film directed by Chuck Jones

- Bugs Bunny, disguised as a Martian, hands Marvin the Martian the Uranium PU-36 Explosive Space Modulator.
- Directed by: Charles M. Jones
- Story by: Michael Maltese
- Starring: Mel Blanc (all voices)
- Music by: Carl Stalling
- Animation by: Ben Washam; Lloyd Vaughan; Ken Harris; Phil Monroe
- Layouts by: Robert Gribbroek
- Backgrounds by: Peter Alvarado
- Color process: Technicolor
- Production company: Warner Bros. Cartoons
- Distributed by: Warner Bros. Pictures; The Vitaphone Corporation
- Release date: July 24, 1948
- Running time: 7:42
- Language: English

Haredevil Hare is a 1948 Looney Tunes cartoon directed by Chuck Jones. It stars Bugs Bunny and it is the debut for Marvin the Martian along with his Martian dog K-9 – both are unnamed in this film. It is the last pre-August 1948 Looney Tunes and Merrie Melodies cartoon whose distribution rights were sold to Associated Artists Productions.

== Plot ==
A prominent newspaper headlines heralding Bugs Bunny's purported enthusiasm to partake as the inaugural passenger on a historic lunar expedition. Contrarily, Bugs vehemently protests this endeavor as he is forcibly conveyed toward the awaiting rocket, only acquiescing upon discovering his beloved carrots being added amongst the cargo. With a thunderous roar, the rocket is sent into the celestial expanse, ensnaring Bugs within its confines as he futilely endeavors to abort the mission.

Upon lunar touchdown, Bugs' initial panic dissipates, replaced by a sense of awe as he navigates the desolate lunar landscape, cognizant of his unprecedented status as the first terrestrial being to tread upon its surface (while failing to notice graffiti claiming "Kilroy was here"). Encountering an enigmatic Martian (Marvin the Martian), Bugs is compelled to inquire about the Martian's clandestine machinations aimed at Earth's annihilation, using a weapon later identified as the Illudium PU-36 Explosive Space Modulator, which has the outward appearance of a mere stick of dynamite. Upon finally realizing the gravity of the situation, Bugs absconds with the Martian's weapon. The Martian sends his loyal canine companion (K-9) to reclaim the modulator, and so Bugs employs his trademark wit and flattery to outmaneuver the dog and the Martian's machinations.

Subterfuge ensues as Bugs, assuming a Martian guise, orchestrates a ruse culminating in the detonation of the modulator, resulting in a cataclysmic lunar upheaval. Upon being contacted shortly thereafter by the lunar expedition personnel back on Earth, Bugs epitomizes his signature blend of resourcefulness and levity in the face of adversity, as his causal conversation with the personnel in his precarious predicament, risking falling into space with the Martian and his dog hanging on his leg, ends with his loud plea for rescue.

== Home media ==
This cartoon is included on disc 3 of the Looney Tunes Golden Collection: Volume 1 DVD set with the cartoon restored and in high definition. This short is also available on disc 1 of The Essential Bugs Bunny DVD set, disc 2 of the Looney Tunes Platinum Collection: Volume 1 Blu-ray and DVD sets and disc 1 of the Bugs Bunny 80th Anniversary Collection Blu-ray set.

== See also ==
- Looney Tunes and Merrie Melodies filmography (1940–1949)
- Bugs Bunny filmography

Preceded by Bugs Bunny Rides Again	Bugs Bunny Cartoons; 1948	Succeeded by Hot Cross Bunny
