= Tweety's S.O.S. =

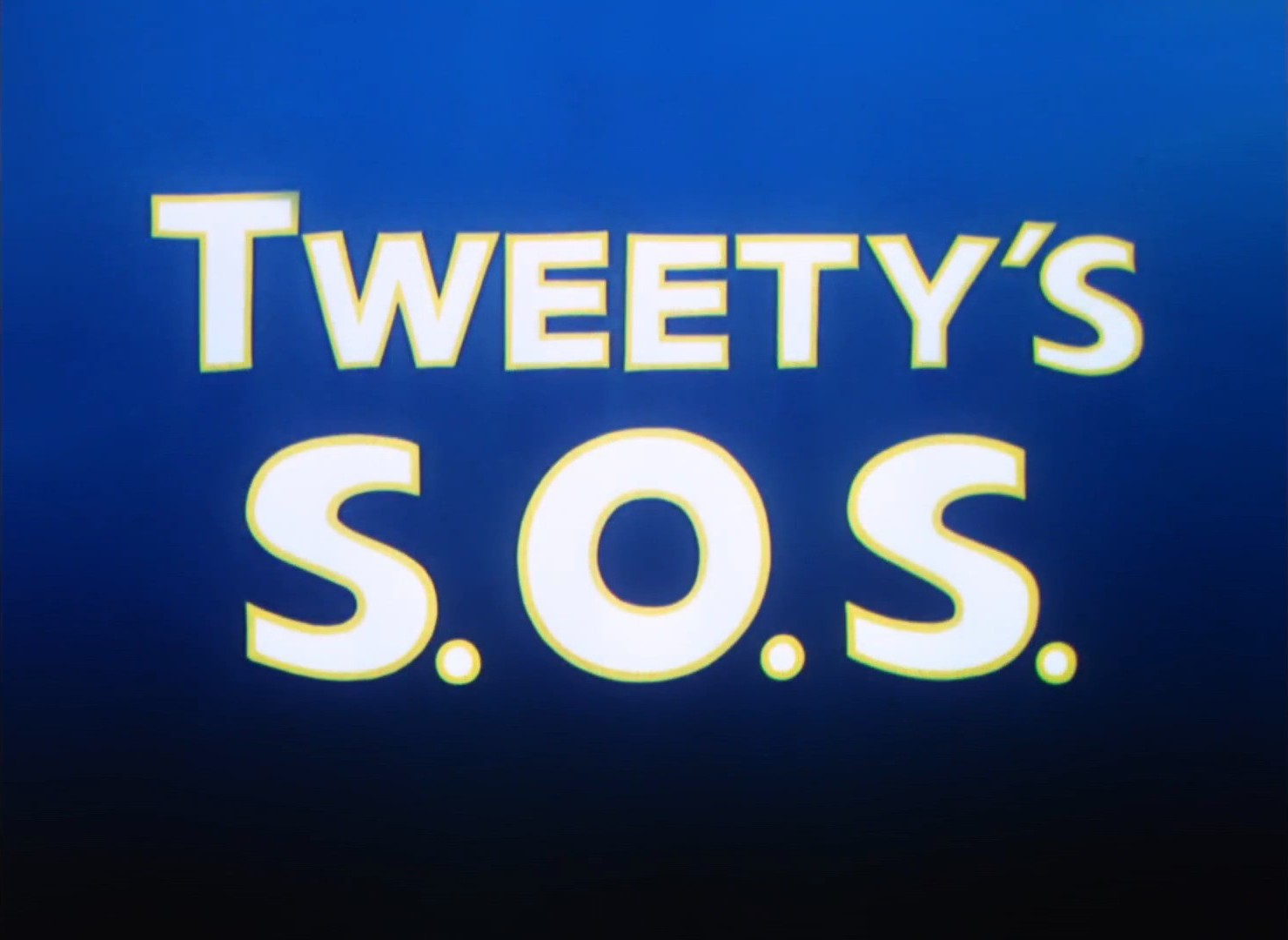
- Title card
- Directed by: I. Freleng
- Story by: Warren Foster
- Starring: Mel Blanc; Bea Benaderet (uncredited)
- Music by: Carl Stalling
- Animation by: Arthur Davis; Manuel Perez; Ken Champin; Virgil Ross
- Layouts by: Hawley Pratt
- Backgrounds by: Paul Julian
- Color process: Technicolor
- Production company: Warner Bros. Cartoons
- Distributed by: Warner Bros. Pictures; The Vitaphone Corporation
- Release date: September 22, 1951
- Running time: 7 minutes 30 seconds
- Language: English

Tweety's S.O.S. is a 1951 Warner Bros. Merrie Melodies cartoon directed by Friz Freleng. The short was released on September 22, 1951, and stars Tweety and Sylvester.

In the film, Sylvester boards a cruise ship in pursuit of Tweety. But he has to contend with both Tweety's protective owner and with his own seasickness.

== Plot ==
The short opens with Sylvester rummaging through trash cans for food. He despondently wanders down to the shipyard and sits by a docked cruise ship. As he ponders things, he becomes aware of a porthole through which can be seen Tweety swinging in his cage. Sylvester grasps the edge of the porthole, opens the window, but Tweety slams it shut, causing Sylvester to drop into the water.

Managing to get aboard, Sylvester enters Tweety's cabin and grabs him. As he heads out the door, Tweety's owner Granny chases the cat, hitting him with her umbrella. Granny's glasses fall off, leaving her distracted, so Sylvester kicks them under the couch and begins pursuing Tweety around the cabin. Tweety runs under the sofa and retrieves the glasses; he can get them back on Granny just as Sylvester leaps at the bird. She swipes at him with the umbrella, misses, but catches him in the head after she throws it at him when he runs from the ship.

The ship sets sail; Granny and Tweety wave and call goodbye to the crowd on shore. Sylvester, stowed away on a lifeboat with the number 13 on it, waves farewell with a white handkerchief.

Soon, Tweety and Granny are taking naps on deck. Sylvester takes Granny's glasses and paints a likeness of the bird on one lens. He opens the cage door and takes Tweety, who flies up, calling for help. Granny wakes up but is fooled into thinking Tweety is there. Sylvester follows Tweety onto high wires; the bird gets safely across while the cat is struggling with his footing. Tweety springs the wire so Sylvester falls, able to hang on to one wire with one paw. As he is sweating with fear, the bird starts doing an "Eeny, Meeny, Miny, Moe" while pulling each 'finger' from the wire. Because the cat has only three, Tweety only reaches 'Miny' before Sylvester falls into the water. Tweety says, "Well, what do you know? No Moe".

Rough seas eventually make Sylvester seasick. When Tweety sees Sylvester's green face, he laughs and offers him something for his tummy: a nice piece of salt pork. Sylvester turns various colors and becomes even sicker; he dashes to the medical room to get some seasick remedy. After he downs this, he is better and chases Tweety, who leads the cat below deck and tricks him into running into the furnace. The fire and heat result in Sylvester being ejected through the smokestack, screaming in agony.

After he climbs back aboard and sees Tweety, once again taking advantage of Sylvester's nausea, who runs again to the medical room for more seasick remedy. Tweety gets there first and fills the bottle with nitroglycerin. He spits and creates a tiny explosive spark. Now he chases Tweety, using his spit as a weapon. As they round a corner, Granny is waiting, umbrella in hand; she begins striking at Sylvester but keeps missing. Tweety tries to tell Granny to stop: "No, no, no, no! Don't hit 'im, Dwanny! You'll be towwy!". Despite Tweety's warnings, Granny finally manages to hit Sylvester and thus sets off the nitroglycerin he drank.

The loud explosion leaves Granny frazzled with a look of "Now he tells me" on her face and Sylvester launched up like a rocket. In the open sky, there is a flash of a firework with a cascade of white sparks before the cat falls back down. The captain, watching through binoculars, uses Tweety's catchphrase: "I tawt I taw a puddy tat!". Sylvester lands on the captain, leaving both looking pretty battered and bruised. Granny is now steering the ship, and Tweety replies, "You did, you did tee a puddy tat!". Granny dons the headgear of an admiral and Tweety a sailor's cap and takes over steering the ship for the dazed captain.
