= The Lion's Busy =

1950 short film by Friz Freleng

- Directed by: I. Freleng
- Story by: Tedd Pierce
- Starring: Mel Blanc
- Music by: Carl Stalling
- Animation by: Arthur Davis; Gerry Chiniquy; Ken Champin; Virgil Ross
- Layouts by: Hawley Pratt
- Backgrounds by: Paul Julian
- Color process: Technicolor
- Production company: Warner Bros. Cartoons
- Distributed by: Warner Bros. Pictures
- Release date: February 18, 1950
- Running time: 7 minutes
- Language: English

The Lion's Busy is a 1950 Warner Bros. Looney Tunes cartoon written by Tedd Pierce and directed by Friz Freleng. It features Leo the Lion (who had previously appeared in Hold the Lion, Please) and Beaky Buzzard (who had previously appeared in Bugs Bunny Gets the Boid and The Bashful Buzzard), both voiced by Mel Blanc.

This cartoon is the first time Blanc voices Beaky due to Kent Rogers' death in 1944, and the final appearance of Leo the Lion from Looney Tunes cartoons until The Sylvester & Tweety Mysteries in 1998. It is also Beaky's only appearance in which he is smarter than his opponent rather than dumber.

The cartoon itself sometimes appears on public domain and grey market VHS and DVDs, however, the cartoon is actually still copyrighted.

== Plot ==
Leo the Lion (who now speaks with an Irish accent in this cartoon), on his tenth birthday, receives a book as a present, and after finding out that lions rarely live beyond ten years, a hungry Beaky Buzzard, who turns out to be the one who had sent the book to him in the first place, takes the chance to eat him for his meal. What follows is a series of attempts by Beaky to eat Leo, starting with making him slip off a cliff using a banana peel to try to kill him. After he lands, Beaky makes a burger out of Leo's tail, which he tricks Leo into biting so he will jump up in pain. Beaky proceeds to catch the lion in a roasting pan and, while Leo is dazed, starts to prepare him for dinner.

Leo comes to his senses and then points out to Beaky that he should wait until he is dead before he tries to eat him, since buzzards typically eat their prey well after they are "decently deceased." When Beaky refuses to back down, Leo instead attempts to beat him with a club. But Beaky evades every swing and takes cover up in a tree, which Leo tries to climb to reach the buzzard and try to beat him up. But Beaky slicks up the tree trunk with oil just as Leo reaches him, making him slide down the trunk, running into hard branches along the way, and crashing hard against the ground, causing Beaky to mockingly tell him, "You really oughta be more careful, Mr. Lion."

Leo makes another attempt to get up the tree, now using climbing hooks to avoid any attempt by Beaky to make him slip again. Seeing this, a startled Beaky thinks fast and, out of nowhere, adds on the trunk of another tree to give Leo more trunk to climb. Leo is initially shocked and frustrated by this, but continues his climb, only to find out that Beaky has added yet another tree trunk to the tree. Leo keeps on climbing up more and more added-on trunks until he finally reaches the top, where he hopes to find Beaky. But Beaky has since flown down to the bottom and starts to chop the tree down, with Leo still in it. Leo is frightened by this, as he has now climbed up to an incredible height, and he tries to dissuade Beaky from chopping. But Beaky chops it down, anyway, and Leo crashes to the ground, feeling dazed afterwards. He comes to his senses seconds later and smells Beaky attempting to cook his tail, which he has now tied up to look like sausage links.

Finally fed up with Beaky, the dimwitted Leo tries to escape to the Moon by a rocket. Unfortunately, by the time he arrives, he finds Beaky already there, waiting to eat him. Leo hides in a cave on the moon and barricades himself inside for years. But the stress and paranoia of knowing that Beaky is outside, still waiting to eat him, finally gets to him one day, and he, now elderly, comes out to surrender himself to him. But so many years have gone by, Beaky, who also is elderly, can no longer eat meat, instead only being able to eat marshmallows, one of which he offers Leo.

== Home media ==
The Lion's Busy is available uncut and restored on Looney Tunes Platinum Collection: Volume 2.
