= Wabbit Twouble =

1941 film by Fred Avery

- Title card. Bob Clampett is credited as supervisor.
- Directed by: Bob Clampett; Fred Avery (uncredited)
- Story by: Dave Monahan
- Produced by: Leon Schlesinger
- Music by: Carl W. Stalling
- Animation by: Sidney Sutherland
- Color process: Technicolor
- Production company: Leon Schlesinger Productions
- Distributed by: Warner Bros. Pictures
- Release date: December 20, 1941
- Running time: 8 min
- Country: United States
- Language: English

Wabbit Twouble is a 1941 American animated comedy short film directed by Fred Avery. It was released on December 20, 1941. It is part of the Merrie Melodies series, the eleventh cartoon to feature Bugs Bunny, the fifteenth cartoon to feature Elmer Fudd and the final Bugs Bunny cartoon to be directed by Avery, as he left the studio before its release; Bob Clampett, who took over his unit, was credited instead, as he helped finish post-production.

== Plot ==
Elmer Fudd arrives at Jellostone National Park, aiming for a tranquil retreat. Upon arrival, he sets up his campsite, unknowingly positioning his tent over Bugs Bunny's rabbit hole. Bugs plays a series of pranks on Elmer, leading the latter into perilous situations such as hanging off a cliff and encountering a grizzly bear. Elmer eventually grows frustrated and leaves, destroying the park's entry sign along the way, leading to his arrest for destruction of government property. The short ends with Elmer finding himself sharing a jail cell with Bugs and the bear from earlier.

== Voice Cast ==
- Mel Blanc as Bugs Bunny / Bear
- Arthur Q. Bryan as Elmer Fudd

== Production ==
This is the first of several Bugs Bunny films that refer to Elmer Fudd's speech impediment, intentionally misspelling the names of supervisor Bob Clampett, lead animator Sid Sutherland, and composer Carl W. Stalling, in the credits to match the speech impediment.

Tex Avery began the project which Clampett finished post-production for; Avery is not credited on screen. This was the first Bugs Bunny and Elmer Fudd cartoon directed by Clampett, with a story by Dave Monahan and musical direction by Carl W. Stalling. Although Sid Sutherland is the only credited animator, the short was also animated by Virgil Ross, Rod Scribner, and Robert McKimson. Mel Blanc provided the voices for Bugs and the bear, and Arthur Q. Bryan provided the voice for Elmer.

For the cartoon, Elmer was redesigned as a fat man (based on voice actor Arthur Q. Bryan's own physique) in an attempt to make him funnier. The "fat Elmer" would only make three more appearances in the Looney Tunes/Merrie Melodies canon – The Wabbit Who Came to Supper, The Wacky Wabbit and Fresh Hare, in addition to a cameo appearance in the war bond advertisement Any Bonds Today? – before returning to the slimmer form by which he is better known, for The Hare-Brained Hypnotist. This cartoon was the only time, though, that the "fat Elmer" also had a red nose. This is also the only cartoon with the "fat" version of Elmer still under copyright; all other "Fat Elmer" cartoons are in the public domain. Cartoon Network's anthology series ToonHeads later focused an episode on this particular design for Elmer in 1999 with "The Year Elmer Fudd Got Fat", which included Wabbit Twouble.

== Reception ==
Animation historian David Gerstein writes, "Wabbit Twouble represents a variant on the trickster of fable and myth who doesn't wait to pester first. Clampett's Bugs invades others' lives for the fun of it—especially when those others seem, like Elmer, to be easy targets... Bugs has immediately identified Elmer as the perfect patsy and mocks his girth and mannerisms. From the point of view of the classic trickster, some people simply deserve a hard time."

== Big Chungus meme ==
The still frame from the short that has come to be known as "Big Chungus"

In December 2018, a still frame from the short depicting Bugs mocking Elmer by imitating his likeness became an Internet meme. The meme originated from fictitious cover art for a video game titled Big Chungus ("chungus" is a neologism coined by video game journalist James Stephanie Sterling in 2012) which featured the still frame and was popularized by a Facebook post by a GameStop manager in Colorado Springs, who alleged that a customer had asked about purchasing the fictional game as a gift for her son.

In April 2021, the character was added to the mobile game Looney Tunes World of Mayhem. Big Chungus was briefly featured in the 2021 film Space Jam: A New Legacy, and was eventually trademarked by Warner Bros. themselves.

== Home media ==
- VHS 1986 - Viddy-Oh! For Kids Cartoon Festivals: Bugs Bunny and Elmer Fudd Cartoon Festival Featuring "Wabbit Twouble" - MGM/UA Home Video
- VHS 1990 - Cartoon Moviestars: Bugs vs. Elmer - MGM/UA Home Video
- VHS 1991 - Bugs Bunny Collection: Here Comes Bugs Bunny - MGM/UA Home Video
- Laserdisc 1991 - The Golden Age of Looney Tunes: Volume 1 - MGM/UA Home Video
- VHS 1992 - The Golden Age of Looney Tunes: Vol. 4 - Bob Clampett - MGM/UA Home Video
- VHS 2001 - Looney Tunes: The Collector's Edition, Vol. 11 - Wabbit Tales - Warner Home Video/Columbia House
- DVD 2003 – Looney Tunes Golden Collection: Volume 1 (restored) - Warner Home Video
- Blu-Ray & DVD 2012 – Looney Tunes Platinum Collection: Volume 2 (restored) - Warner Home Video

=== Streaming ===
- Boomerang (2017-2024)
- HBO Max (2020-2025)
- Tubi (2025-Present)

== See also ==
- Bugs Bunny filmography
- Elmer Fudd filmography
- Looney Tunes and Merrie Melodies filmography (1940–1949)

| Preceded by All This and Rabbit Stew | Bugs Bunny Cartoons; 1941 | Succeeded by The Wabbit Who Came to Supper |
