= Arthur Q. Bryan =

American actor (1899–1959)

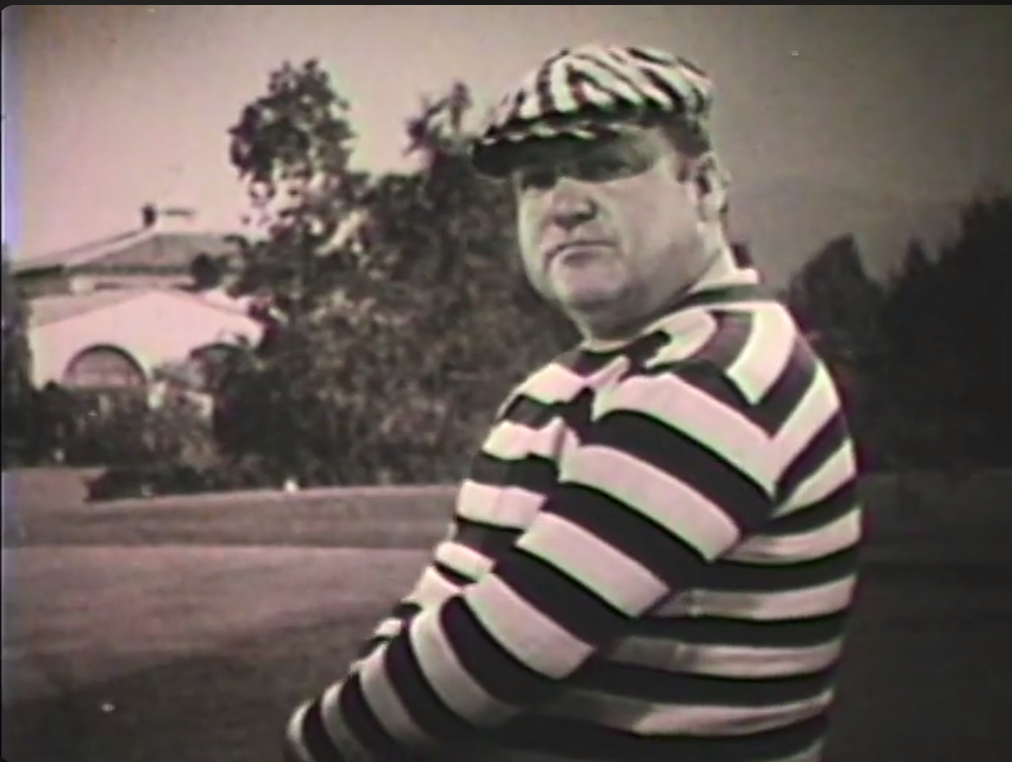
- Bryan in 1941
- Born: Arthur Quirk Bryan; May 8, 1899; New York City, U.S.
- Died: November 30, 1959 (aged 60); Hollywood, California, U.S.
- Resting place: Valhalla Memorial Park Cemetery, California, U.S.
- Occupations: Actor; radio personality
- Years active: 1926–1959

Arthur Quirk Bryan (May 8, 1899 – November 30, 1959) was an American actor and radio personality. He is best remembered for his longtime recurring role as well-spoken, wisecracking Dr. Gamble on the radio comedy Fibber McGee and Molly and for voicing the Warner Bros. cartoon character Elmer Fudd.

== Early life ==
Arthur Q. Bryan was born in Brooklyn, New York City, on May 8, 1899. He sang in a number of churches in the New York City area and had plans to be a professional singer. In 1918, he began working as an insurance clerk at the Mutual Life Insurance Company. He sang tenor with the Seiberling Singers and the Jeddo Highlanders on NBC radio.

== Career ==
=== Radio ===
He started as a singer in 1926 on WGBS and he continued as a tenor soloist on WEAF in 1928. In 1929, Bryan was an announcer at WOR radio in New Jersey. Contemporary radio listings in a daily newspaper indicate that he was still at WOR as late as September 13, 1931. In October 1931, he began working as an announcer at WCAU in Philadelphia, and in 1933 he moved to Philadelphia's WIP By 1934, he was heard on WHN in New York. In 1938–1940, he was a regular on The Grouch Club, which aired on the CBS Pacific network and was featured in some short-subject films made by the group. Bryan started voicing Elmer in 1940 in Elmer's Candid Camera and voiced the character all the way until his death.

Bryan's work in animation did not go unnoticed by radio producers. Although his first forays into that medium were accompanied by instructions that he use the Fudd voice, Bryan soon came to the attention of Don Quinn and Phil Leslie, the production and writing team responsible for Fibber McGee and Molly and their supporting characters, two of whom spun off into their radio hits, The Great Gildersleeve and Beulah. The Gildersleeve character, played by Harold Peary, became series broadcasting's first successful spin-off hit; that plus the onset of World War II (which cost Fibber McGee & Molly their Mayor La Trivia, when Gale Gordon went into the Coast Guard in early 1942, and "The Old Timer" Bill Thompson was drafted almost a year later) nabbed nearly every other remaining male voice.

Bryan was first hired for the new Great Gildersleeve series, to play the part of Cousin Octavia's secretary/assistant, Lucius Llewellyn (using the Elmer Fudd voice), and later one of Gildersleeve's cronies, Floyd Munson, the barber. His work on the series (in Bryan's natural voice) so impressed Quinn and Leslie, that Bryan was added to the cast of their main show, Fibber McGee and Molly, in 1943.

In the early 1940s, Bryan played Waymond Wadcliffe on the Al Pearce & His Gang program on CBS. Bryan starred as Major Hoople (from June 22, 1942, to April 26, 1943), appeared in the cast of The Charlotte Greenwood Show, and played Lt. Levinson on radio's Richard Diamond, Private Detective (from September 6, 1950, to June 29, 1951). In the mid-1940s, he had the role of Duke on Forever Ernest.

On May 5th 1949, Bryan appeared as "Clarence, the Guardian Angel" on the Screen Directors Playhouse radio series' rendition of Frank Capra's film It's a Wonderful Life. The episode also starred James Stewart reprising his film role as "George Bailey".

=== Films ===
Bryan first became involved with the film industry when he moved to Hollywood in 1936 to become a scenario writer for Paramount Pictures.

Bryan's live-action work remained largely in uncredited cameo roles, usually employing the Fudd persona, or minor supporting roles in B-movies (like the apoplectic newspaper editor in the Bela Lugosi thriller The Devil Bat). In the 1940 Charley Chase short South of the Boudoir, he speaks in his normal voice, but at one point slips into his Fudd voice while coming on to Chase's wife. He did work steadily, appearing in dozens of films over the years, in such successful releases as Samson and Delilah; two Bob Hope/Bing Crosby Road to ... films, Road to Singapore and Road to Rio; and the Ozzie and Harriet feature Here Come the Nelsons. He appeared frequently in live-action short-subjects for Warner Bros. Pictures and Columbia Pictures.

Bryan continued as the Fibber show's secondary male lead, even after Thompson and (for a time) Gordon returned to the show, and he stayed as Dr. Gamble all the way through its final incarnation on the NBC Monitor series in 1959, as well as playing Floyd on "Gildersleeve" through its conclusion in 1954. Bryan's final original work as Fudd came in the Warner Bros. Edward R. Murrow spoof Person to Bunny.

=== Television ===
Bryan was a panelist on the early TV quiz show Quizzing the News (1948–49). He would be found in numerous productions in the early 1950s predominantly in 1-episode bit parts, such as in the early filmed television comedy, Beulah. He also landed a minor television role in 1955, as the handyman Mr. Boggs in the short-lived CBS sitcom Professional Father. On The Halls of Ivy, Bryan played Professor Warren, head of the college's history department, a role he also had on the radio program of the same name. On September 17, 1956, he became ill with acute gastritis while rehearsing for an episode of Producers' Showcase called "The Lord Don't Play Favorites", three hours before its airtime. Staging director Bretaigne Windust replaced Bryan during production.

== Death ==
Bryan died of a sudden heart attack at age 60 on November 30, 1959, in Hollywood. Bryan is buried in Valhalla Memorial Park Cemetery.

== Legacy ==
The DVD specials for some cartoons such as What's Opera, Doc?, in Looney Tunes Golden Collection, include bits of conversation between Bryan and Mel Blanc, affording a rare opportunity to hear them working together and to hear Bryan's natural voice. Bryan's natural voice is also heard as the tired hotel guest in A Pest in the House, in which Bryan "talks to himself"; Elmer Fudd is the hotel manager.

== Selected filmography ==
- The Great Library Misery (1938, Short) – Mr. F.T Smith
- Broadway Serenade (1939) – Process Server (uncredited)
- Dangerous Dan McFoo (1939, Short) – Dan McFoo (voice, uncredited)
- I Stole a Million (1939) – Cafe Mgr. Forbidding Dancing (uncredited)
- These Glamour Girls (1939) – Dance Customer (uncredited)
- Dad for a Day (1939, Short) – Spanky's Father
- Little Accident (1939) – Customer
- Elmer's Candid Camera (1940, Short) – Elmer Fudd (voice, uncredited)
- Road to Singapore (1940) – Bartender (uncredited)
- Millionaire Playboy (1940) – J.B. Zany
- Confederate Honey (1940, Short) – Ned Cutler (voice, uncredited)
- The Hardship of Miles Standish (1940, Short) – John Alden (voice, uncredited)
- South of the Boudoir (1940, Short) – Thomas Bailey
- Swing with Bing (1940, Short) – Golf Duffer
- A Wild Hare (1940, Short) – Elmer Fudd (voice, uncredited)
- The Devil Bat (1940) – Joe McGinty
- Elmer's Pet Rabbit (1941, Short) – Elmer Fudd (voice, uncredited)
- Manpower (1941) – Drunk Texan (uncredited)
- Ellery Queen and the Perfect Crime (1941) – Book Salesman
- Look Who's Laughing (1941) – Mayor Duncan's Aide (uncredited)
- Wabbit Twouble (1941, Short) – Elmer Fudd (voice, uncredited)
- The Wabbit Who Came to Supper (1942, Short) – Elmer Fudd (voice, uncredited)
- The Wacky Wabbit (1942, Short) – Elmer Fudd (voice, uncredited)
- Nutty News (1942, Short) – Narrator (voice, uncredited)
- Fresh Hare (1942, Short) – Elmer Fudd (voice, uncredited)
- Larceny, Inc. (1942) – Man in Street Socking Jug (uncredited)
- A Desperate Chance for Ellery Queen (1942) – Waymond Wadcwiff (uncredited)
- Grand Center Murder (1942) – Medical Examiner (uncredited)
- Johnny Doughboy (1942) – Irish Mayor (uncredited)
- Swing Out the Blues (1943) – Larry Stringfellow
- An Itch in Time (1943) – Elmer Fudd (voice, uncredited)
- National Barn Dance (1944) – Samson (uncredited)
- I'm from Arkansas (1944) – Commissioner of Agriculture
- She Wouldn't Say Yes (1945) – Train Passenger in sleeping car (speaking in Elmer Fudd voice)
- Idea Girl (1946) – Commissioner P.J. Maple
- The Dark Horse (1946) – Mr. Hodges (uncredited)
- The Devil Thumbs a Ride (1947) – Santa Ana Police Desk Sergeant (uncredited)
- Road to Rio (1947) – Mr. Stanton (uncredited)
- A Pest in the House (1947) – Elmer Fudd, Hotel Guest (voice, uncredited)
- Samson and Delilah (1949) – Fat Philistine Merchant Wearing No Robe
- The Greatest Show on Earth (1952) – Spectator (uncredited)
- Here Come the Nelsons (1952) – Deputy (uncredited)
- The Life of Riley (1953–1957, TV Series) – The Country Store Owner / Curtiss
- Broken Lance (1954) – Bit Part (uncredited)
- Hell's Outpost (1954) – Harry – Bank Accomplice
- Hare Brush (1955) – Elmer Fudd (voice, uncredited)
- Rabbit Rampage (1955) – Elmer Fudd (voice, uncredited, cameo)
- The Lieutenant Wore Skirts (1956) – Mr. Curtis
- Wideo Wabbit (1956, Short) – Elmer Fudd (voice, uncredited)
- The Go-Getter (1956) – The Handyman
- What's Opera, Doc? (1957) – Elmer Fudd (voice, uncredited)
- The Adventures of Jim Bowie (1957, TV Series) – Hotel Clerk / Henri
- A Mutt in a Rut (1959, Short) – Elmer Fudd (voice, uncredited)
- Person to Bunny (1960) – Elmer Fudd (voice, uncredited, final role) (Posthumous release)
- Bugs Bunny's 3rd Movie: 1001 Rabbit Tales (1982) – Elmer Fudd (voice) (Archival recordings)
