= Nevada Department of Motor Vehicles =

Nevada state agency

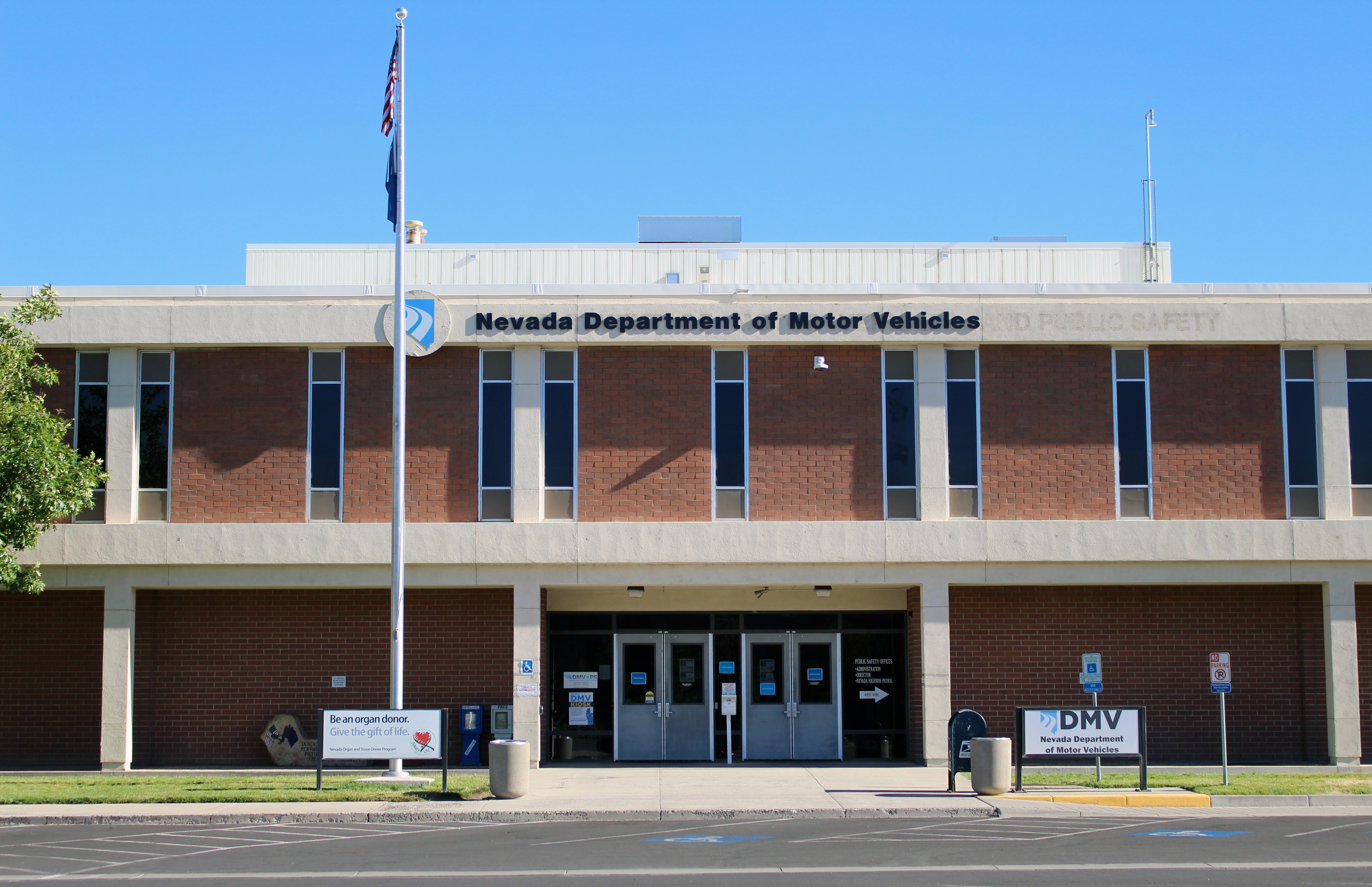
DMV headquarters in Carson City

The Nevada Department of Motor Vehicles (DMV) is a Nevada state agency responsible for issuing driver licenses and vehicle registration. The DMV operates a total of 20 offices across the state, with five in Las Vegas, two in Reno, and one each in Henderson, Sparks, Carson City, Elko, Ely, Fallon, Hawthorne, Laughlin, Mesquite, Pahrump, Tonopah, Winnemucca, and Yerington. The DMV is headed by a director, and the position is currently occupied by Tonya Laney. It is based in Carson City, Nevada's capital.

== History ==
The DMV was created by the Nevada Legislature on July 1, 1957. From 1985 to 2001, the department was known as the Nevada Department of Motor Vehicles and Public Safety because various public safety agencies were merged into the department in 1985, 1993, and 1995. In August 2001, the public safety agencies were split off into a new Nevada Department of Public Safety, while the Department of Motor Vehicles became an independent state agency again as it was in 1957.

== Structure ==
The Nevada DMV has seven divisions, which are the following:

1. Field Services Division
2. Research and Project Management Division
3. Administrative Services Division
4. Motor Carrier Division
5. Central Services and Records Division
6. Compliance Enforcement Division
7. Motor Vehicle Information Technology Division

== See also ==
- Department of Motor Vehicles
- Driver's license in the United States
- Driving in the United States
- Government of Nevada
- Vehicle license plates of the United States
