= Super-Rabbit =

1943 film by Charles M. Jones

- Title card
- Directed by: Charles M. Jones
- Story by: Tedd Pierce
- Produced by: Leon Schlesinger
- Starring: Mel Blanc; Kent Rogers; Tedd Pierce
- Music by: Carl W. Stalling
- Animation by: Ken Harris
- Color process: Technicolor
- Production company: Leon Schlesinger Productions
- Distributed by: Warner Bros. Pictures
- Release date: April 3, 1943
- Running time: 8 min
- Country: United States
- Language: English

Super-Rabbit is a 1943 American animated comedy short film directed by Charles M. Jones. It is part of the Merrie Melodies series and the twentieth cartoon to star Bugs Bunny.

It is a parody of the popular comic book and radio character Superman by DC Comics, as well as the Superman cartoons produced by Fleischer Studios, which writer Tedd Pierce worked on before returning to Leon Schlesinger Productions and writing Super-Rabbit. In the film, onlookers are heard speculating on its nature: "Look! Up there in the sky!" "It's a boid" [bird]!" "Nah, it ain’t a boid, it's a dive-bommah." Bugs is able to fly during the carrot's strict time limit, yet is humorously unable to handle high leaps.

== Plot ==
Professor Cannafraz (a Richard Haydn impression) creates a "super carrot" and uses it on his test subject – Rabbitus idioticus americanus (Bugs Bunny), who immediately consumes the proffered carrot. Armed with temporary superhero abilities that need to be replenished with additional super carrots, Bugs remembers a newspaper article about Texas hunter "Cottontail" Smith, who wants to exterminate all rabbits.

Bugs, adorned in a superhero costume complete with cape, flies to Deepinaharta, Texas, and assumes the guise of a mild-mannered forest creature by wearing oversized reading glasses and a hat. He encounters Smith, who attempts to shoot Bugs, only for the bullets to form an outline of the rabbit before harmlessly falling to the ground. Bugs then hands Smith a cannon, eats another super carrot as a precaution, then, upon being struck by the cannonball, plays basketball with it, quickly shoving Smith and his horse onto bleachers while he acts as his own cheerleader. After Bugs returns to the sky, the bemused Smith and his horse follow the rabbit in an airplane. Using his super powers, Bugs then snatches the shell of the plane away from them, plunging Smith and the horse to the ground.

Cruising through the sky, Bugs begins to run out of power, but when he tries to recharge again, he accidentally drops his carrots and he falls to the ground. After Bugs lands, he opens his eyes to see a line of chewed carrot tops eaten by Smith and his horse-turned-Superhero, both wearing cape and costume. Bugs turns to the camera and says "This looks like a job for a REAL Superman!" He ducks into a phone booth. Both Smith and the horse are ready to attack – until the booth opens and they both snap to attention and salute. Bugs marches out in a Marine uniform, singing the "Marines' Hymn". He dismisses the two, claiming he has "important work to do!", and marches off to "Berlin, Tokyo and points East."

== Legacy ==
In the film's climax, Bugs resolves to join the U.S. Marine Corps, which he deems a "real" Superman. The actual U.S. Marine Corps were pleased by this gag to the point they insisted the character be officially inducted into the force as a private, which was done, complete with dogtags. The character was regularly promoted until Bugs was officially "discharged" at the end of World War II as a Master Sergeant.

Cottontail Smith later appears as one of Yosemite Sam's sidekicks in Looney Tunes: Back in Action. The character's voice is a less raucous version of Sam's and Foghorn Leghorn's.

In 2019, it was shortlisted for the 1944 Retro-Hugo Award for Best Dramatic Presentation, Short Form.

== Home media ==
- VHS – Bugs Bunny Cartoon Festival featuring "Hold the Lion, Please"
- VHS and Laserdisc – Bugs & Daffy: The Wartime Cartoons
- VHS – Bugs Bunny On Parade
- VHS – Looney Tunes Collectors Edition: Running Amuck
- Laserdisc – The Golden Age of Looney Tunes Volume 3
- DVD – Looney Tunes Golden Collection: Volume 3
- DVD – Superman: The Ultimate Collection
- Blu-ray – Bugs Bunny 80th Anniversary Collection

== See also ==
- Bugs Bunny filmography
- Looney Tunes and Merrie Melodies filmography (1940–1949)

== Sources ==
- Shull, Michael S.; Wilt, David E. (2004). "Filmography 1943". Doing Their Bit: Wartime American Animated Short Films, 1939–1945. McFarland & Company. ISBN 978-0786481699.
- Weldon, Glen (2013), "...and the American way (1942-1945)", Superman: The Unauthorized Biography, John Wiley & Sons, ISBN 978-1118483787

Preceded by Tortoise Wins by a Hare	Bugs Bunny Cartoons; 1943	Succeeded by Jack-Wabbit and the Beanstalk
