= Phantom vehicle =

Vehicle that causes injury, death, or damage without making physical contact

In vehicle insurance, a phantom vehicle is one that causes injury, death, or damage without making physical contact. For example, a run-off-road accident can be caused by a car in the opposing direction drifting partly over the center line of a highway, then veering away. In some such cases, the driver of the phantom vehicle, much like a hit and run driver, leaves the scene, and thus in the subsequent accident investigation, the presence of the vehicle is known only through eyewitness testimony, unless a dashcam records video evidence.

In general, liability for the accident is assigned to the driver who violated a traffic law or roadway rule at the time of the collision. The driver who forced the other person to take evasive action to avoid a crash will be responsible, regardless of whether there was actual physical contact.
