= Fresh Hare =

1942 film by Isadore Freleng

- Title card
- Directed by: Isadore Freleng
- Story by: Michael Maltese
- Produced by: Leon Schlesinger
- Starring: Mel Blanc; Arthur Q. Bryan; (both uncredited)
- Music by: Carl W. Stalling
- Animation by: Manuel Perez
- Color process: Technicolor
- Production company: Leon Schlesinger Productions
- Distributed by: Warner Bros. Pictures
- Release date: August 22, 1942
- Running time: 8 min
- Country: United States
- Language: English

Fresh Hare is a 1942 American animated comedy short film directed by Isadore Freleng. It was released on August 22, 1942. It is part of the Merrie Melodies series, the sixteenth cartoon to feature Bugs Bunny, the seventeenth cartoon to feature Elmer Fudd and the final cartoon to feature his "fat" design modeled after his voice actor Arthur Q. Bryan. It is the first cartoon to feature Elmer Fudd's victory against Bugs.

== Plot ==
Elmer Fudd the Mountie earnestly attempts to arrest Bugs Bunny who is wanted for multiple misdemeanors, including "Resisting an officer, assault and battery, trespassing, disturbing the peace, miscellaneous misdemeanors, public nuisance, traffic violations, going through a boulevard stop, jaywalking, triple parking, conduct unbecoming to a rabbit", and (again) "violating traffic regulations.". After following the rabbit tracks to a burrow, Elmer tries to lure Bugs out with a carrot. This works, at least with Bugs' hand, and Elmer initially succeeds in getting a handcuff around the rabbit's wrist. Somehow, though, Bugs works his arm free of the cuff—‌out of sight in his burrow—‌and attaches a bomb in its place. Elmer, attached to the bomb via the other handcuff, panics when he pulls it out of the burrow. He frantically searches for his keys, only to find that Bugs has them and, leaning against a nearby tree, is nonchalantly twirling them around his finger while munching a carrot. Bugs deliberately takes his time going through each and every key, but does not find the correct one until the bomb explodes off-screen. Elmer, who is completely unharmed by the explosion, tells Bugs that he has been found guilty of committing a litany of crimes.

As Elmer reads, Bugs takes his Mountie hat and impersonates a superior officer: "Attention! Why, look at you! You call yourself a Mountie! You're a disgrace to the regiment! I'm gonna drum you out of the service!" He then tears off Elmer's uniform, revealing a tightened corset and polka-dot undershorts.

When Elmer realizes he's been tricked, he begins to give chase—‌after pausing to put his miraculously refurbished uniform back on. The chase eventually involves a path beneath the snow, which ends abruptly when Elmer runs into a pine tree. The impact causes all the snow to fall off the tree, which reveals Christmas decorations, and Elmer emerges from underneath with snow on his face that gives him a Santa Claus appearance. The song Jingle Bells plays in the background, and Bugs says to the astonished Elmer, "Merry Christmas, Santy!" and burrows his way out of Elmer's path.

Elmer rediscovers Bugs's footprints and follows them. He finds Bugs taunting a snow effigy of Elmer the Mountie. Bugs announces he is going to punch it square in the nose, saying Elmer can't catch him, let alone catch a cold. Elmer has crept up behind Bugs and is tapping his foot, waiting to catch the rabbit by surprise. However, as Bugs finishes his wind-up for the punch, he turns around at the last moment and slugs the real Elmer square in the nose, propelling him backward into an ice-wall and revealing a heart with an arrow through it. Bugs again burrows away.

After some more hijinks and another failed chase, a weeping Elmer gives up and labels himself as a disgrace for failing to catch the rabbit since he is a disgrace to the regiment (alluding to Bugs' earlier statement), at which point Bugs willingly turns himself in. Elmer exploits the second chance to one-up Bugs by blindfolding him and sentencing him to death by firing squad (despite the fact that most of his alleged crimes were essentially misdemeanors). As the firing squad prepares to execute Bugs, Elmer tells him that he can make one last wish, which prompts Bugs to say, "I Wish, I Wish, I Wish I Was in Dixie". Elmer and the firing squad grant his final wish by wearing blackface and perform the chorus of "Camptown Races" with him before shooting him dead offscreen.

== Edited prints ==
The "minstrel show" sequence at the end of the short was edited in multiple ways on various networks in the United States. On Cartoon Network and TNT, an iris quickly fades out after Bugs breaks into and starts to sing Dixie. On TBS, the ending audio of the short stays intact, but while the unedited audio played, TBS's edit repeatedly plays Bugs breaking into Dixie with Elmer shockingly looking at him multiple times until the soundtrack ends as the iris fades out. In 2003, WVTV Channel 18 in Milwaukee, Wisconsin aired the short unedited during a public domain cartoon program, without any advance warning.

== Home media ==
This short is available as a bonus feature on the Captains of the Clouds DVD release. For unknown reasons, a known restored version produced for the Looney Tunes Golden Collection series was never used for official home media releases.

== See also ==
- Bugs Bunny filmography
- Elmer Fudd filmography
- Looney Tunes and Merrie Melodies filmography (1940–1949)
- List of animated films in the public domain in the United States

Preceded by Bugs Bunny Gets the Boid	Bugs Bunny Cartoons; 1942	Succeeded by The Hare-Brained Hypnotist
