= A Pest in the House =

1947 film by Chuck Jones

- Title card
- Directed by: Chuck Jones
- Story by: Tedd Pierce; Michael Maltese
- Starring: Mel Blanc; Arthur Q. Bryan
- Music by: Carl Stalling
- Animation by: Ben Washam; Ken Harris; Basil Davidovich; Lloyd Vaughan
- Layouts by: Richard Morley
- Backgrounds by: Richard Morley
- Color process: Technicolor
- Production company: Warner Bros. Cartoons
- Distributed by: Warner Bros. Pictures
- Release date: August 2, 1947
- Running time: 7:50
- Language: English

A Pest in the House is a Merrie Melodies animated short film released on August 2, 1947. It is directed by Chuck Jones and stars the characters of Daffy Duck and Elmer Fudd.

== Plot ==
A brief narration describes a labor shortage that "became so bad" that employers are willing to hire "anybody – or anything". At the "Gland Hotel", Daffy is a hotel bellhop and Elmer Fudd is the manager. Elmer tells Daffy to take a customer to room 666. The customer (voiced by Arthur Q. Bryan, in his natural voice) asks for peace and quiet, and suddenly threatens to punch Elmer right in the nose if he is disturbed at any time, causing Daffy, in a Jerry Colonna-like sarcastic aside to the audience, to remark: "Likable chap, isn't he?"

After escorting the man to room 666 and briefly tricking him into getting locked out, Daffy causes no end of noise trying to do his job, awakening the customer in the process. Every time this happens, the increasingly irritated man trudges to the lobby, to the tune of "Pop Goes the Weasel", and at the second where the song says "pop", he punches Elmer in the face (Elmer at one point gets hit through the phone and later dons a knight's helmet in a futile attempt to prevent getting hit).

Near the end, Daffy finally concludes it is too cold in the man's room and decides to fix the radiator. Elmer, knowing he will get beat up again, chases after Daffy. Daffy makes the heat vibrate to the room. Elmer hears whistling and covers it with several pillows. Daffy, thinking that Elmer is blowing whistles, proceeds to yell at him so loudly to him that he once again wakes the now infuriated man, so Elmer hurries downstairs and he and Daffy switch places through a fake promotion in an effort to fool the man: "Fow vewy mewitowious sewvice, you are hewewith pwomoted to the position of managew. Take ovew." However, Elmer gets punched one last time, and Daffy concludes the cartoon with another Jerry Colonna-like aside: "Noisy little character, isn't he?"

== Voice Cast ==
- Mel Blanc as Daffy Duck / Unseen Drunk Guest / Narrator
- Arthur Q. Bryan as Elmer Fudd / Tired Guest (uncredited)

== Production notes ==
- A Pest in the House offers a distinctive portrayal of Daffy Duck, diverging from earlier depictions by Tex Avery and Bob Clampett, as well as the later characterization popularized by Chuck Jones. In the DVD audio commentary, Paul Dini describes Daffy as akin to a sprite, portraying him as a mischievous yet harmless creature, devoid of malicious intent.
- It is one of only three non-Bugs Bunny cartoons released in 1947 not to be reissued.
- A similar plot was used Daffy Duck Slept Here (1948), with Daffy once again disrupting the peace as a fellow guest in a hotel, this time causing unrest for Porky Pig.

== Reception ==
Director David Bowers writes, "A Pest in the House is a great cartoon featuring a terrific performance from Daffy Duck. Although it's directed by Chuck Jones, he hadn't yet developed Daffy into the selfish, greedy, ill-tempered foil to Bugs Bunny that he would become. For me, the cartoon is the best of two worlds: the wonderful drawings, poses, and comic timing of Jones' direction coupled with the much funnier Daffy of directors Bob Clampett and Frank Tashlin. ... Daffy was rarely more obnoxious—or funnier."

== Home Media ==
- VHS 1988 - Cartoon Moviestars: Elmer! - MGM/UA Home Video
- Laserdisc 1988 - Cartoon Moviestars Bugs! & Elmer! - MGM/UA Home Video
- Laserdisc 1992 - The Golden Age of Looney Tunes: Volume 2 - MGM/UA Home Video
- DVD 2007 - Looney Tunes Golden Collection: Volume 5 (restored) - Warner Home Video
- DVD 2007 - Looney Tunes Spotlight Collection: Volume 5 (restored) - Warner Home Video
- Blu-Ray & DVD 2011 - Looney Tunes Platinum Collection: Volume 1 (restored) - Warner Home Video
- DVD 2013 - Best of Warner Bros: 50 Cartoon Collection - Looney Tunes (restored) - Warner Home Video

== See also ==
- Daffy Duck filmography
- Elmer Fudd filmography
- Looney Tunes and Merrie Melodies filmography (1940–1949)
