= Uncontrolled intersection =

Intersection lacking road markings or lights

An uncontrolled intersection is a road intersection where no traffic lights, road markings or signs are used to indicate the right of way. They are found either in residential neighborhoods or in rural areas. While the intersection itself is unmarked, warning signs or lights may be present to alert drivers to it.

== Uncontrolled T-intersection ==
At an uncontrolled T-junction (3-way intersection), right of way rules differ from country to country. In Australia, the United Kingdom, New Zealand and parts of the United States (really just California as is cited), traffic on the terminating road must give way (yield) to traffic on the continuing road. In Germany, traffic generally has to give way to traffic on the right at an uncontrolled intersection, whether it is a 3-way intersection or not. This is also the case in many US states, such as Washington.

== Uncontrolled 4-way intersection ==
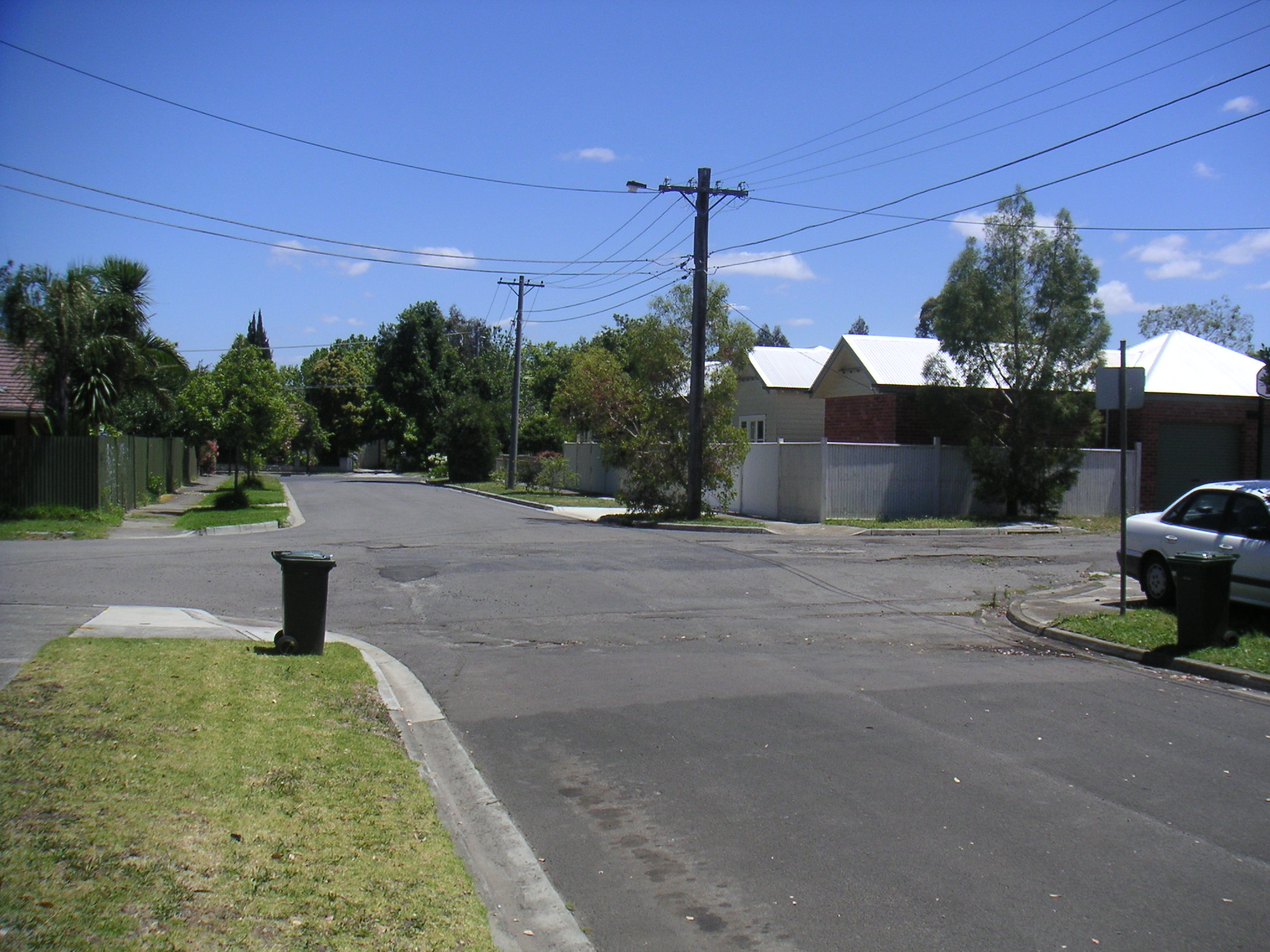
An uncontrolled intersection in suburban Melbourne, Australia

At uncontrolled 4-way intersections, the common rules are:

- give way to traffic approaching from the passenger's side (i.e. from the right in countries that drive on the right-hand side, a rule known as priority to the right, and vice versa)
  - however, this may be the opposite depending on the local laws
- turning traffic with crossing paths usually gives way to traffic driving straight through in the opposite direction
- drivers opposite one another and both turning in their same direction, e.g. both drivers turning to their right (in countries that drive on the right-hand side) do not need to give way to one another as their paths will not cross.

Common practice dictates that drivers will treat the intersection as if they have a give way (yield) sign and look both directions for cross-traffic to avoid any accidents with motorists who did not recognize or did not follow the uncontrolled intersection rule.
