= The Wabbit Who Came to Supper =

1942 film by Isadore Freleng

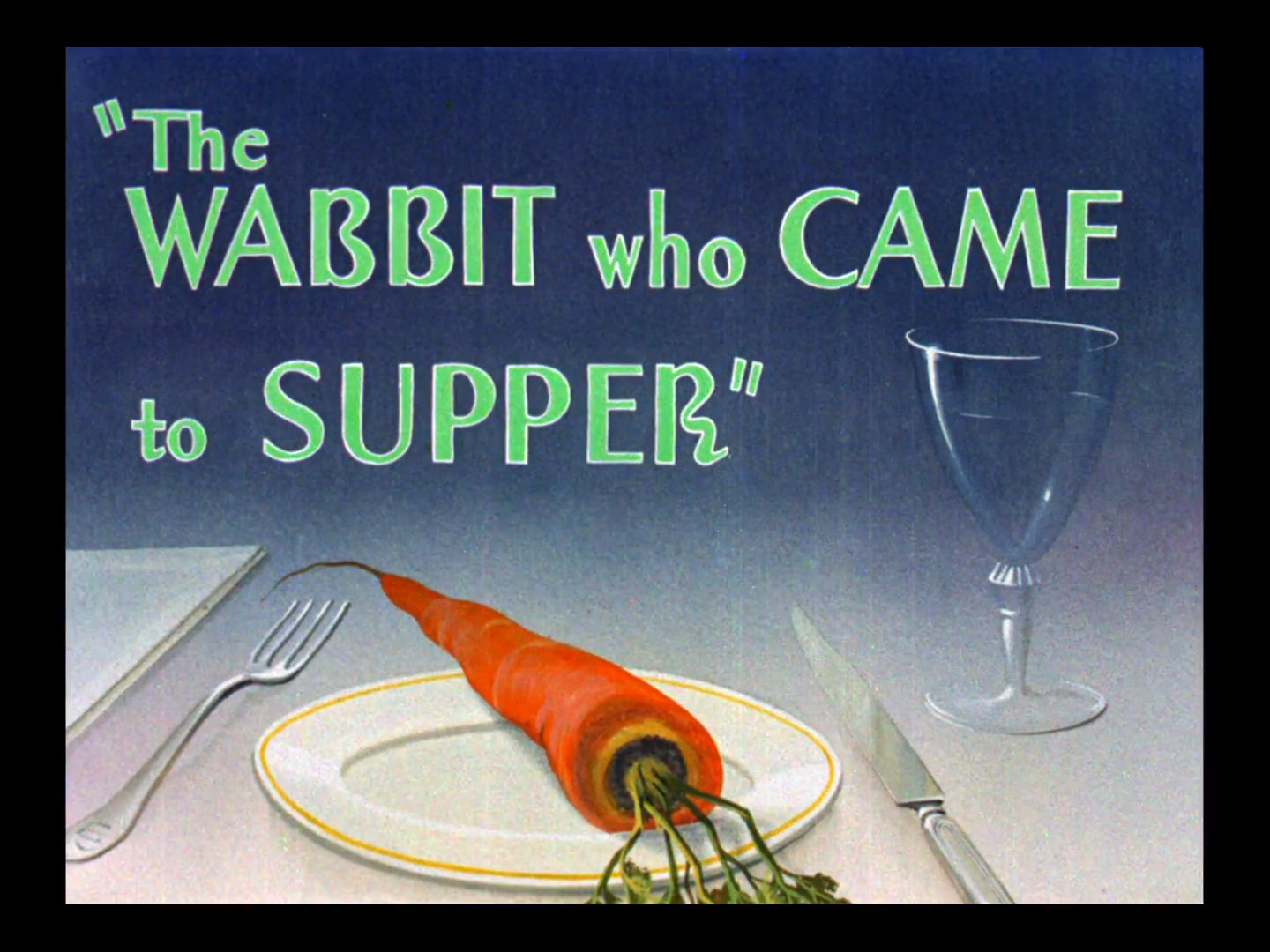
- Title card
- Directed by: Isadore Freleng
- Story by: Michael Maltese
- Produced by: Leon Schlesinger
- Starring: Mel Blanc (uncredited); Arthur Q. Bryan (uncredited)
- Music by: Carl W. Stalling
- Animation by: Richard Bickenbach
- Color process: Technicolor
- Production company: Leon Schlesinger Productions
- Distributed by: Warner Bros. Pictures
- Release date: March 28, 1942
- Running time: 8 min
- Country: United States
- Language: English

The Wabbit Who Came to Supper is a 1942 American animated comedy short film directed by Isadore Freleng. It was released on March 28, 1942. It is part of the Merrie Melodies series, the twelfth cartoon to feature Bugs Bunny and the sixteenth cartoon to feature Elmer Fudd.

== Plot ==
Elmer Fudd hunts Bugs Bunny with his hunting dogs. Upon cornering him, Elmer receives a telegram informing him of an inheritance of $3 million from his uncle Louie. The telegram warns that Elmer would forfeit the inheritance if he harmed animals, particularly rabbits.

This directive sets the stage for a series of comedic exchanges between Elmer and Bugs as they navigate the terms of the inheritance. Despite Elmer's initial attempts to capture Bugs, the reminder of his uncle's conditions prompts him to release the rabbit and return home. However, Bugs' irreverent behavior and mischievous antics soon disrupt Elmer's attempts at peace, leading to a comedic struggle for control within the household. Bugs' inventive schemes further complicate matters, including feigning illness to manipulate Elmer's sympathies and exploiting his fears of losing the inheritance. The dynamic between the two characters oscillates between moments of genuine concern and comedic absurdity, as Bugs continually outwits Elmer with his quick thinking and resourcefulness.

Later on, Elmer receives a letter from Uncle Louie's attorney that Uncle Louie has died and Elmer himself has inherited $3 million. However, he discovers that the inheritance has been depleted due to taxes and legal fees, leaving him owing $1.98 (equivalent to $39.02 in 2025) to Uncle Louie's attorney. Furious at having to put up with Bugs's shenanigans for nothing and with nothing left to lose, Elmer chases Bugs around the house and successfully kicks him out. As retribution, Bugs mails Elmer his offspring as an "Easter surprise".

== Home media ==
This short is available on disc 1 of the Looney Tunes Golden Collection: Volume 3 DVD set, presented uncut and restored with a commentary track provided by animation historian Jerry Beck and inker Martha Sigall, one of about 40 uncredited inkers and painters who labored on the Looney Tunes shorts.

== See also ==
- List of animated films in the public domain in the United States
- Bugs Bunny filmography
- Elmer Fudd filmography
- Looney Tunes and Merrie Melodies filmography (1940–1949)

Preceded by Wabbit Twouble	Bugs Bunny Cartoons; 1942	Succeeded by Any Bonds Today?
