= Traffic law in the United States =

For driving in the United States, each state and territory has its own traffic code or rules of the road, although most of the rules of the road are similar for the purpose of uniformity, given that all states grant reciprocal driving privileges (and penalties) to each other's licensed drivers.

There is also a "Uniform Vehicle Code" which was proposed by a private, non-profit group, based upon input by its members. The UVC was not adopted in its entirety by any state. As with uniform acts in general, some states adopted selected sections as written or with modifications, while others created their own sui generis statutes touching upon the same subject matter.

As required by the federal Highway Safety Act of 1966, all states and territories have adopted substantially similar standards for the vast majority of signs, signals, and road surface markings, based upon the Manual on Uniform Traffic Control Devices from the U.S. Department of Transportation. Many of the standard rules of the road involve consistent interpretation of the standard signs, signals, and markings such as what to do when approaching a stop sign, or the driving requirements imposed by a double yellow line on the street or highway.

In order to implement their own traffic laws on the property of their own facilities (such as national parks and military posts), several federal agencies have also developed their own traffic laws.

== Standard rules ==
List of some standard rules of the road:

- Entering and leaving roadways.
- Right of way at marked and unmarked intersections under various conditions.
- Observing and interpreting traffic signs (especially warning, priority or prohibitory traffic signs)
- Keeping to right side (or left side) except to pass others, where passing is allowed.
- Direction of travel and turning (one way, do not enter, no U-turn, etc.)
- Speed, height, width and weight limits.
- Bicycle and pedestrian priority.
- Yielding to special vehicles (emergency, funeral, school bus).
- Vehicle lighting and signalling.
- Stopping if there has been a collision.

Georgia’s new law which took effect from July 1, 2018, prohibits the drivers from holding any devices (Mobile phones or any electronic devices) in hand while driving.

Traffic is required to keep to the right, known as a right-hand traffic pattern. The exception is the US Virgin Islands, where people drive on the left.

Most states in the United States enforce priority to the right at uncontrolled intersections, where motorists must yield to the right.

The two most important differences between U.S. traffic rules and foreign countries' traffic rules are as follows:

- Very heavy use of fully-signed, mandatory 4-way stop signs at intersections (rather than 2-way stops, yields, or roundabouts as in other countries) with priority to the first vehicle (priority to the right if two arrive at the exact same time)
- Traffic lights are normally positioned after the intersection, on the far side from approaching traffic, rather than before

=== Speed limits ===
Maximum speed limits in the United States vary by jurisdiction from 55 to 85 mph.

Speed limits are set by each state or territory, as well as counties or municipalities, on the roads within their jurisdiction. The maximum speed limit on rural two-lane roads ranges from 50 mph (80 km/h) in parts of the northeast to 75 mph (120 km/h) in parts of Texas. On rural Interstate Highways and other freeways, the speed limit ranges from 60 mph (96 km/h) in Hawaii to 85 mph (136 km/h) in parts of Texas. All roads in the United States have a speed limit, but it is not always posted (especially in rural areas).

=== Lane discipline and overtaking ===
Overtaking, usually called "passing", is legal on all four or more lane roads and on most two-lane roads with sufficient sight distance. On two-lane roads, one must pass to the left of the overtaken vehicle unless that vehicle is preparing to make a left turn, in which case the vehicle must be passed on the right.

Passing on the left means that the overtaking vehicle must enter the oncoming lane. This should only be done in a legal passing zone, designated by either a dashed yellow center-line (indicating that passing is legal in both directions) or a solid line paired with a dashed line (indicating that passing is only legal for traffic adjacent to the broken line). A solid double yellow line indicated that passing is illegal in both directions. In some states, it is not against the law to overtake vehicles in the presence of solid yellow lines if it is safe to do so.

For example, Vermont state law also allows passing across the double yellow line when no traffic is on the opposing side; however, one must pass quickly and return to the proper side. However, this is unusual as most states have a ban on crossing a double yellow line except when turning, or when pedestrians, bicycles, or other obstructions in the road make it necessary. Overtaking another vehicle across a solid yellow line is usually considered a serious traffic violation in most states.

On roads with four or more lanes (including divided highways), vehicles may pass to the left or to the right of slower vehicles as long as the maneuver can be completed safely. However, most states either suggest or require that through traffic stay to the right except to pass. The Manual on Uniform Traffic Control Devices includes several signage standards to inform drivers of proper lane discipline, including the "STAY RIGHT PASS LEFT" and "SLOWER TRAFFIC KEEP RIGHT" signs.

=== Seat belt use ===
49 states, the District of Columbia and the five inhabited territories have passed laws requiring seat belt use by at least all occupants of the front seat. New Hampshire is the only state with no such requirement for adults (anyone under eighteen must use a seat belt). Some states also require rear seat occupants to wear seat belts. In 24 states, the seat belt law is considered to be only a secondary offense, meaning that a police officer can only ticket a person for violating the seat belt law if the driver has already been stopped for another reason. The effectiveness of seat belt laws varies considerably throughout the country, with some areas observing over 95% usage and others with less than 40% usage.

=== Road signs ===
In the United States, road signs are, for the most part, standardized by federal regulations, most notably in the Manual on Uniform Traffic Control Devices (MUTCD) and its companion volume the Standard Highway Signs (SHS). Under a federal regulation promulgated by the Federal Highway Administration pursuant to the Highway Safety Act, states must remain in "substantial conformance" with the MUTCD. This standard does not require states to precisely conform to the MUTCD, which allows for a degree of local variation in certain minor aspects of road signs and markings.

== Uniform Vehicle Code ==
The Uniform Vehicle Code (UVC) is a model act developed by the National Committee on Uniform Traffic Laws and Ordinances (NCUTLO), a defunct private non-profit organization. Most of the members were state governments, in addition to some related organizations. The extent to which the code is used varies by each state, territory, and Native American tribe. It was last updated in 2000.

Although the UVC was broadly influential, virtually all American jurisdictions extensively rearranged, renumbered, and rewrote various UVC sections in the process of enacting them. One example of the resulting complexity is that in 1979, the NCUTLO needed 262 pages just to explain all state-by-state variations of each section of UVC Chapter 11, Rules of the Road.

Some time not long after the release of the 2000 edition, " [the] NCUTLO went into hiatus because of a lack of funding. The primary problem was that the Internet provided, at no cost, much of the information that was previously easily available only from the committee for the cost of an annual membership." It has since ceased operations. In the absence of NCUTLO, the NCUTCD (the NCUTLO's counterpart in the development of the Manual on Uniform Traffic Control Devices) has appointed a task force to review potentially outdated portions of the most recent edition of the UVC, and to propose updated language. The last update was issued in 2015.

== International standards ==
The United States was one of the original signatories on September 19, 1949, to the Geneva Convention on Road Traffic, which came into effect in the United States on August 30, 1950. However, the United States has not signed or ratified subsequent treaties like the Vienna Convention on Road Traffic.

== See also ==
- Driving in the United States
