= The Three Bears (Looney Tunes) =

Warner Bros. theatrical cartoon characters

- Looney Tunes/Merrie Melodies characters
- The Three Bears as seen in What's Brewin', Bruin?
- First appearance: Bugs Bunny and the Three Bears (1944)
- Created by: Chuck Jones
- Voiced by: Henry Bear: Mel Blanc (1944–1949); Billy Bletcher (1948–1951); Frank Welker (1990–1991); Jeff Bergman (1991); Ed Asner (1993); Will Ryan (2003); Maurice LaMarche (2013); Andrew Dickman (2023); Fred Tatasciore (2023–present); Harrietta Bear: Bea Benaderet (1944–1951); Mel Blanc (1948); Tress MacNeille (1990–1991); June Foray (1991); Joe Alaskey (2003); Grey DeLisle (2013); Candi Milo (2023); Stephanie Southerland (2023–present); Junior Bear: Kent Rogers (1944); Stan Freberg (1948–2003); Joe Alaskey (2005); John DiMaggio (2013); Stephen Stanton (2023); Ben Diskin (2023–present)

In-universe information
- Species: Grizzly bears
- Gender: Male (Papa and Junior); Female (Mama)
- Nationality: American

The Three Bears are animated cartoon characters in the Warner Bros. Looney Tunes and Merrie Melodies series of cartoons. The dysfunctional family consists of Henry "Papa" Bear, Mama Bear, and Junior Bear (sometimes spelled Junyer or Joonyer). The characters were featured in five theatrical cartoons released between 1944 and 1951, based on Goldilocks and the Three Bears.

== Characters ==
- Papa Bear (also known as Henry Bear) is the father of Junior Bear and the husband of Mama Bear. Papa Bear is an obnoxious, loud-mouthed, short-tempered and stubborn know-it-all dwarf bear. He often abuses Junior if he does or says something wrong. While Papa and Junior are the two who are constantly at each other's hair, usually Junior is at the receiving end of Papa's wrath and Papa will spontaneously become enraged. For all of his temperament and while he is often abusive, Papa is actually never abusive with Mama Bear, but he does tell her to shut up if she tries to tell him something important.
- Mama Bear (also known as Harrietta Bear) is the mother of Junior Bear and the wife of Papa Bear. Mama Bear is an intelligent, long-suffering, mild-mannered, and deadpan bear. When she tries to tell Henry something important, he usually tells her to "shut up" and refuses to listen. While she does not seem to show it, she has a great deal of affection for her husband and son, although she resorts to thwack Papa or Junior with a newspaper to keep the peace.
- Junior Bear (sometimes spelled Junyer) is the child of Henry Bear and Mama Bear. Junior Bear is an oversized, dim-witted, naive, childish, clumsy, but good-natured bear. He is 7-years-old, yet he is twice as tall as his parents, and has a heavy voice. He idolizes his father Henry, who is often abusive toward him. Junior wears a diaper.

== Appearance ==
=== First theatrical film ===
Animator Chuck Jones introduced the trio in the 1944 cartoon Bugs Bunny and the Three Bears, in which Bugs Bunny invades the home of the three bears, and Mama Bear takes a fancy to him. In the short, Papa Bear tries to feed his starving family by having them act out their roles in the traditional fairy tale from which they derive their name. Unfortunately for them, when they were out of porridge, Mama substitutes carrot soup for it, and the "Goldilocks" they lure turns out to be Bugs. Purcell and Liepien, in Parallel Curriculum Units for Social Studies, Grades 6-12, recommended this film as part of the study of the sociological implications of humor; Steven Case, in Toons That Teach, also mines this work for pedagogic value.

=== Further theatrical appearances ===
Jones brought back the Bears for his 1948 cartoon What's Brewin', Bruin?, this time without Bugs. Here, Papa Bear decides that it is time for the Bears to hibernate; however, various disturbances interfere. Junior's voice is here supplied by Stan Freberg.

Other Three Bears cartoons included Bee-Deviled Bruin and Bear Feat, both released in 1949. The final Three Bears cartoon of the classic era, A Bear for Punishment (1951), parodies cultural values surrounding the celebration of Father's Day.

=== Film appearances ===
The entire Bear Family appears in the 2003 film Looney Tunes: Back in Action movie as tourists from Paris (Papa Bear is voiced by Will Ryan, Mama Bear by Joe Alaskey and Stan Freberg returns as the voice of Junior Bear).

The Three Bears make a cameo appearance in the 2006 direct-to-video film Bah, Humduck! A Looney Tunes Christmas as Daffy Duck's employees.

The Three Bears make a cameo appearance in the 2021 film Space Jam: A New Legacy in Bugs Bunny's flashback alongside other Looney Tunes leaving Tune World.

=== Television appearances ===
The Bear Family made several appearances in Warner Bros. 1990 animated series Tiny Toon Adventures, all in Season 1:

- "Prom-ise Her Anything": Ma Bear cameos as a canteen cook at the ACME Looniversity junior prom.
- "Bear Necessities", a short that was part of the episode "Fairy Tales for the 90s". Framed as modern re-telling of "Goldilocks and the Three Bears", the episode is a satire on 1990s suburbia, where the Bears have moved to a modern home, complete with updated technology. Elmyra, a neighbor, enters the house after the Bears leave for a shopping trip to ACME Acres Mall. Elmyra goes through the requisite porridge sampling and trying out the various beds (eventually falling to sleep in Junior's). When the Bears return, Elmyra instantly is smitten and smothers each of them – especially Pa – with over-affection. Eventually, the police are called, but the officers mistake the Bears as the trespassers and they are sent to the zoo to live ... which frustrates Papa but Junior likes.
- "Teddy Bears Picnic", as part of "The Acme Home Shopping Show". Once again, the Bears are teamed with Elmyra, who follows the family to a picnic and singing happily about the antics that follow. Junior tries to get Pa enthused about the various activities, but Pa gets the worst end of either Junior's clumsiness or, more than once, the ire of a larger, muscular bear that doesn't like or appreciate having his picnic interrupted by Pa. In the end, after Pa, Junior and the larger father bear get the worst end of a gas grill explosion, Junior lands on Elmyra, crushing her just seconds after she finishes her song.

The entire Bear Family appears in a painting on the bedroom wall in the Animaniacs episode "Nighty-Night Toon".

Papa Bear (listed in the credits as Vern) appears in the Animaniacs episode "Garage Sale of the Century" (voiced by Ed Asner) as a bachelor, where he has a garage sale, swindling his customers out of their money, and refusing to give refunds, but the Warners took the expression too literally and wanted to buy his garage. Papa Bear refused to sell his garage, and after the Warners attempted to bargain with him and auction off his garage, he saw through their ruse, but his customers demanded refunds. Papa Bear attempted to lie about donating all of his "profits" to charity, but Wakko used his garage door opener (which he repaired after accidentally breaking it earlier) to expose his money, and his customers (including Batman, Buster Bunny, Babs Bunny, Dizzy Devil), and especially an old woman who he rudely refused her a refund (a penny) and threw into a tree earlier in the episode, got their refunds by force, leaving Papa Bear broke, and so he caved in and sold his garage to the Warners for 26¢ (even though the actual value was $20,000) as it was attached to his house.

The Three Bears appear in The Looney Tunes Show episode "Ridiculous Journey" from its second season (Papa Bear voiced by Maurice LaMarche, Mama Bear voiced by Grey DeLisle and Junior Bear voiced by John DiMaggio). They are seen driving on a vacation trip, with Junior frequently causing mishaps.

The Three Bears star in the Looney Tunes Cartoons episodes "Moody at the Movies" and "Life's a Beach", featuring their ill-fated trips to the theatre and the beach. The Bears also make a cameo appearance in the episode "Happy Birthday Bugs Bunny!"

The Three Bears appear in the Bugs Bunny Builders episode "Honey Bunny". Here, while ill-fated and unlucky as usual, Henry is depicted without his short temper or abusive nature, due to the show being aimed towards preschoolers.

== See also ==
- Baby Huey
- Barney Bear
