= Beaky Buzzard =

Warner Bros. theatrical cartoon character

- Looney Tunes/Merrie Melodies character
- Beaky Buzzard along with Bugs Bunny in Bugs Bunny Gets the Boid (1942)
- First appearance: Bugs Bunny Gets the Boid (1942)
- Created by: Bob Clampett
- Voiced by: Kent Rogers (1942–1944); Mel Blanc (1949–1950); Rob Paulsen (1991); Jeff Bennett (1997); Joe Alaskey (2001–2005); Jim Cummings (2013, 2024–present); Jeff Bergman (2014–2018); Michael Ruocco (2020–2023); Eric Bauza (2023)

In-universe information
- Alias: Killer (in Bugs Bunny Gets the Boid)
- Species: Turkey vulture
- Gender: Male
- Family: Mother Buzzard; Unnamed siblings

Beaky Buzzard (initially known as "Killer") is an animated cartoon character in the Warner Bros. Looney Tunes and Merrie Melodies series of cartoons.

He is a young turkey vulture (sometimes called a "buzzard" in the United States) with black body feathers and a white tuft around his throat. His neck is long and thin, bending 90 degrees at an enormous Adam's apple. His neck and head are featherless, and his beak and feet are large and yellow or orange, depending on the cartoon. The character is depicted as simpleminded with drawled speech, a perpetual silly grin, and partially-closed eyes.

Beaky was partly based on Edgar Bergen's puppet Mortimer Snerd.

== Popularity ==
The films were popular in theaters, and Beaky was familiar enough to be given roles in more recent productions. In the 1940s, the character was also disproportionally popular in comics (see below).

== Short subjects ==
The character first appeared in the 1942 cartoon Bugs Bunny Gets the Boid, directed by Bob Clampett. The cartoon's plot revolves around the hopeless attempts of the brainless buzzard, here called Killer, to catch Bugs Bunny for his domineering Eastern European mother back at the nest. Beaky's voice was reminiscent of ventriloquist Edgar Bergen's character Mortimer Snerd (his in-studio name was in fact "Snerd Bird", bestowed by Bob Clampett himself; he was not named "Beaky" on-screen in this first appearance). The voice itself was provided by voice actor Kent Rogers, who was only 18 years old at the time.

Clampett brought the character back in the 1945 film The Bashful Buzzard, a cartoon that closely mirrors its predecessor, only this time featuring Beaky's hapless hunting (contrasting with the war-like formation flying and dive bombing of his brothers) without Bugs as an antagonist. Rogers reprised his role as the character's voice for the film, but he was killed in a Naval aviation training accident at Pensacola, Florida before finishing all his dialogue.

Clampett left the studio in 1945, ending Beaky's career for a time. The character was eventually brought back in the 1950 Friz Freleng film The Lion's Busy, now voiced by Mel Blanc. Freleng made the buzzard smarter, pitting him against a dim-witted lion named Leo. Robert McKimson also featured the character in another film that same year, Strife with Father. McKimson's Beaky is returned to his idiotic self, this time under the tutelage of his adoptive father, a sparrow who is trying to teach Beaky how to survive in the wild. After that, Beaky did not appear in any more cartoons during the classic era; his appearances were deliberately limited out of respect for Kent Rogers.

== Later and minor appearances ==
Beaky has had minor roles in various Warner Bros. projects, such as Tiny Toon Adventures, where he plays the mentor of the character Concord Condor, and the movies Space Jam (1996) as a member of the Tune Squad, 2003's Looney Tunes: Back in Action as an Acme pilot voiced by Joe Alaskey, and Space Jam: A New Legacy (2021) very briefly seen leaving Tune World in Bugs' flashback, in front of an unknown figure and Cecil Turtle.

Beaky Buzzard appeared in The Sylvester & Tweety Mysteries in the episode "3 Days & 2 Nights of the Condor", where he was voiced by Jeff Bennett. Beaky's mother, who appeared in many of his original shorts, also appeared in an episode of the show (voiced by Tress MacNeille).

Beaky made a cameo in Bah, Humduck! A Looney Tunes Christmas as one of Daffy's employees.

Beaky appeared in The Looney Tunes Show in the second-season episode "Ridiculous Journey", voiced by Jim Cummings.

Bizzy Buzzard, a female equivalent to (or a relative of) Beaky, appears in the preschool series Bugs Bunny Builders; Mama Buzzard has appeared as well.

Beaky made an appearance in the series Looney Tunes Cartoons, voiced by Michael Ruocco. He appeared in the episodes "Buzzard School" (2020, with Bugs), "Desert Menu" (2023, with Bugs), and "A Prickly Pair" (2023, solo), as well as several short interstitial gags featuring him. Mama Buzzard occasionally appears in the series.

Beaky's most recent appearance was a cameo in Coyote vs. Acme. He was a test subject for the Acme Corporation who subjected him to Project Sisyphus.

== Comics and merchandising ==
Beaky is featured in numerous issues of Dell Comics' Looney Tunes comic book series. From early 1943 to late 1945 he often starred in stories of his own, occasionally paired with another minor player, Henery Hawk. In the years afterward, he continued to feature in other characters' stories, often as a dimwitted friend of Bugs and Porky; occasionally his equally dimwitted nephew, Bernard, appeared as well. In more recent decades, Beaky appeared in a print spinoff of Space Jam in 1997, as well as in occasional issues of DC's modern-day Looney Tunes comic book. The character was licensed for Looney Tunes merchandise such as a metal coin bank, and, in 1973, along with other characters in a series of collectible Pepsi glass cups .

== Filmography ==
=== Warner Films theatrical short subjects ===
- Bugs Bunny Gets the Boid (1942)
- The Bashful Buzzard (1945)
- The Lion's Busy (1950)
- Strife with Father (1950)

=== Other appearances ===
Film

- Carrotblanca (1995) (cameo)
- Space Jam (1996)
- Looney Tunes: Back in Action (2003) voiced by Joe Alaskey.

Television

- Tiny Toon Adventures (in "High Toon") voiced by Rob Paulsen.
- The Sylvester & Tweety Mysteries (in "3 Days & 2 Nights of the Condor") voiced by Jeff Bennett.
- The Looney Tunes Show (in "Ridiculous Journey") voiced by Jim Cummings.
- Looney Tunes Cartoons (2020) voiced by Michael Ruocco.

Audio recordings

- Bugs Bunny in Storyland (1949) (as Simple Simon)
