= The Bashful Buzzard =

- "Blue Ribbon" reissue title card
- Directed by: Robert Clampett
- Story by: Michael Sasanoff
- Starring: Mel Blanc (all other voices); Kent Rogers (Beaky Buzzard); Sara Berner (Mama Buzzard)
- Music by: Carl W. Stalling
- Animation by: Robert McKimson; Manny Gould; Rod Scribner; C. Melendez
- Layouts by: Thomas McKimson
- Backgrounds by: Richard H. Thomas
- Color process: Technicolor
- Production company: Warner Bros. Cartoons
- Distributed by: Warner Bros. Pictures
- Release date: September 15, 1945
- Running time: 6:42
- Language: English

The Bashful Buzzard is a Looney Tunes cartoon completed in 1944 and released on September 15, 1945. It is directed by Robert Clampett and is the second to feature the character Beaky Buzzard.

The cartoon is notably the last Warner Bros. cartoon to feature the voice of Kent Rogers, who died in a training flight accident on July 9, 1944.

== Plot ==
In an opening sequence similar to Bugs Bunny Gets the Boid, Mama Buzzard tasks her children to catch food for an evening stew. As they are sent on their way, her slow and dimwitted son Beaky (named Killer in this short) refuses to go, forcing her to kick him off of the ledge.

Beaky follows his siblings to a nearby farm. As his brothers "divebomb" to capture some chickens, Beaky ends up crashing into a weather vane after mistaking it as a "great big rooster". Mama laments to his son for his foolishness and in an attempt to prove her wrong, Beaky attempts to catch a sheep only to accidentally rip off her wool coat instead, revealing her in blue lingerie. Embarrassed, Beaky returns the wool back to the angry sheep who immediately snatches it back and then proceeds to beat him into the ground with a shower comb while angrily scolding him for the ordeal.

Later that day, Beaky's siblings have captured other various animals such as a cow, a dog, a horse and a pack of elephants (with a smaller one holding a sign reading "I am NOT Dumbo."), while Beaky himself had only caught a tiny bumblebee. A larger bee, presumably the parent, arrives and stings Beaky, who crash lands and soothes his sting in some water. While there, a small head pops out from behind rocks. Beaky picks a fight with the animal he calls "Shorty". He yanks on the head and tries to lift it from the ground before realizing that what he is confronting is actually a large dragon.

Beaky runs from the dragon, and the scene changes to the mother buzzard worrying late into the night about him not returning home. However, he does arrive back home, and while his mother is initially happy to see him return, she soon becomes angry as he seemingly once again had not brought anything home for dinner. However, when the camera pans down, it is revealed that Beaky caught the dragon, who dismisses the mother's claim by saying "Well, now, I wouldn't say that!" (a reference to Mr. Peavey of The Great Gildersleeve). The dragon then laughs directly in front of the camera as the cartoon irises out with Bob Clampett's signature "Baywoop!" sound effect.

== Home media ==
DVD:

- Looney Tunes Golden Collection: Volume 5

Blu-ray/DVD:

- Looney Tunes Platinum Collection: Volume 2
