= Bugs Bunny and the Three Bears =

1944 film by Chuck Jones

- Title card
- Directed by: Charles M. Jones
- Story by: Tedd Pierce
- Produced by: Leon Schlesinger
- Starring: Mel Blanc; Bea Benaderet; Kent Rogers
- Music by: Carl W. Stalling
- Animation by: Robert Cannon; Ken Harris; Ben Washam; James Culhane; Phil DeLara
- Backgrounds by: Gene Fleury
- Color process: Technicolor
- Production company: Leon Schlesinger Productions
- Distributed by: Warner Bros. Pictures
- Release date: February 26, 1944
- Running time: 7:22
- Country: United States
- Language: English

Bugs Bunny and the Three Bears is a 1944 Merrie Melodies cartoon short directed by Chuck Jones and written by Tedd Pierce. The short was released on February 26, 1944, and features Bugs Bunny. This short marks the first appearance of Jones' dysfunctional version of The Three Bears, and is a parody of the old fairy tale, Goldilocks and The Three Bears.

== Plot ==
Three Bears, afflicted by hunger pangs, devise a scheme to entice Goldilocks using carrot soup as bait due to a lack of porridge. Subsequently, they orchestrate a feigned departure, only to lurk within their domicile, anticipating Goldilocks's arrival. The savory aroma emanating from the simmering soup captivates Bugs Bunny, leading him into the Bears' abode, unwittingly assuming the role of the traditional trespasser in the Goldilocks and the Three Bears fable.

Bugs partakes of the Bears' culinary offering, prompting their attempted assault thwarted by Bugs's near detection. Following a brief respite, Bugs reclines in Junior's bed, precipitating the Bears' enactment of the Goldilocks tale culminating in a futile pursuit as Bugs eludes capture. Mama Bear, stirred by Bugs's flattery, momentarily suspends aggression, succumbing to infatuation and pursuing amorous overtures.

In his endeavor to evade Mama Bear's advances, Bugs traverses various chambers, encountering Mama Bear in progressively alluring guises, only to find himself ensnared in his own rabbit hole. Mama Bear, seizing the opportunity, indulges in affectionate exchanges with Bugs, culminating in a flurry of unseen embraces. Bugs emerges disheveled, bearing evidence of their encounter, and flees into the distance screaming, leaving Mama Bear adorned with crimson lipstick, basking in the afterglow of their liaison.

== Cast ==
- Mel Blanc as Bugs Bunny and Papa Bear
- Bea Benaderet as Mama Bear
- Kent Rogers as Junior Bear

== Production notes ==
Mel Blanc provides the voices of Bugs and Papa Bear (for the latter using a raucous voice similar to Yosemite Sam only a little higher-pitched). Mama Bear is voiced by Bea Benaderet, while Kent Rogers voiced dim-witted Junior. The cartoon was released four months before Rogers' death in a crash during a training flight in Pensacola, Florida, while he was in the United States Navy during World War II; Stan Freberg and Billy Bletcher took over as the voices of Junior and Papa in subsequent shorts.

== Home media ==
- VHS - Cartoon Moviestars: Bugs!
- Laserdisc - Cartoon Moviestars: Bugs! and Elmer!
- VHS - Bugs Bunny Collection: Bugs Bunny's Greatest Hits
- Laserdisc - The Golden Age of Looney Tunes: Vol. 3, Side 2: Bugs Bunny
- DVD - Looney Tunes Golden Collection: Volume 1, Disc Three
- DVD - Looney Tunes: Spotlight Collection, Disc One
- Blu-ray - Bugs Bunny 80th Anniversary Collection, Disc One

== Sources ==
- Sandler, Kevin S. (1998), "Notes to Pages 162-165", in Sandler, Kevin S. (ed.), Reading the Rabbit: Explorations in Warner Bros. Animation, Rutgers University Press, ISBN 978-0813525389

== See also ==
- Bugs Bunny filmography
- Looney Tunes and Merrie Melodies filmography (1940–1949)

| Preceded by What's Cookin' Doc? | Bugs Bunny Cartoons; 1944 | Succeeded by Bugs Bunny Nips the Nips |
