= Strife with Father =

1950 film by Robert McKimson

- Directed by: Robert McKimson
- Story by: Warren Foster
- Starring: Mel Blanc
- Music by: Carl Stalling
- Animation by: Emery Hawkins; Charles McKimson; Phil DeLara; Rod Scribner; J.C. Melendez
- Layouts by: Cornett Wood
- Backgrounds by: Richard H. Thomas
- Color process: Technicolor
- Production company: Warner Bros. Cartoons
- Distributed by: Warner Bros. Pictures; The Vitaphone Corporation
- Release date: April 1, 1950
- Running time: 7:15
- Language: English

Strife with Father is a Warner Bros. Merrie Melodies animated film directed by Robert McKimson and starring voice actor Mel Blanc. It was produced in 1948 and released in 1950. This is the fourth and final cartoon to feature Beaky Buzzard.

== Plot ==
A buzzard egg is mysteriously delivered to two sparrows, Gwendolyn and Monte (parodies of actors Ronald Colman and his wife Benita Hume). The "upper crusty" and very proper English Sparrows are not accustomed to having a repulsively ugly (and incredibly stupid) little bird about, but Gwendolyn convinces her husband that the baby bird will grow into a "beautiful swan".

Unfortunately, as the narrator tells us, the little ugly bird grows into a very large ugly bird. Monte cannot even stand hearing the name of their "progeny", particularly when eating. But nonetheless, he takes Beaky out into the world to demonstrate the art of hunting for prey, such as barnyard fowl. Of course Beaky, being incredibly shy and inept, repeatedly causes many grievous injuries to Monte, and it is all Monte can do to salvage what little self-respect remains.

== Home media ==
Strife with Father is available restored with its original titles on Looney Tunes Platinum Collection: Volume 2.
