= Driving in the United States =

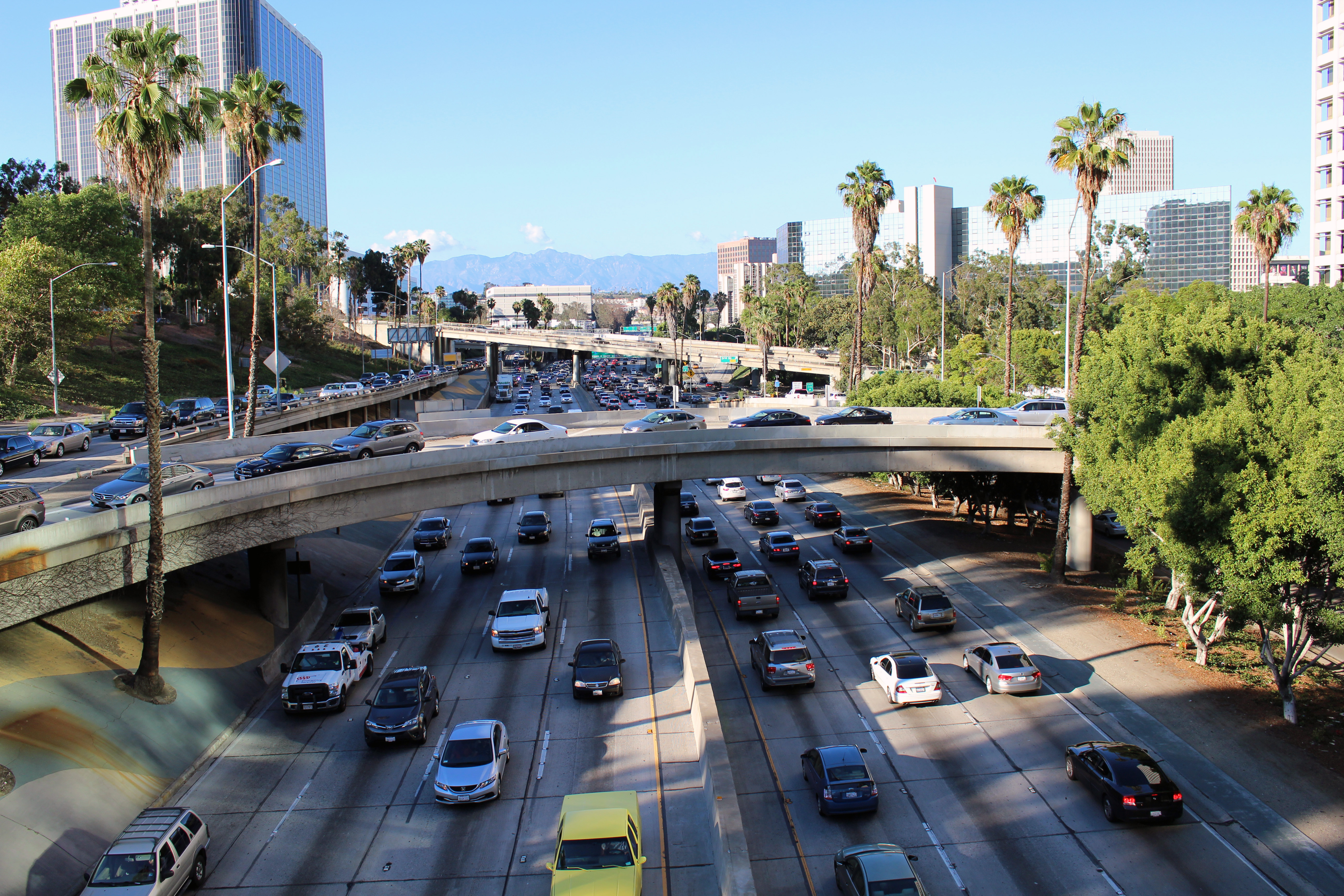
Rush hour on the Harbor Freeway in downtown Los Angeles

In the United States, 86 percent of people use private automobiles as their primary form of transportation to their workplace.

Each state has the authority to set its own traffic laws and issue driving licenses, although these laws are largely the same and licenses from other states are respected throughout the country. Most states require drivers to have vehicle insurance. An international driving license allows one to drive in the U.S. for three months, after which a local driving license is required.

Americans generally drive on the right side of the road. (Note: The exception is the U.S. Virgin Islands.) There are numerous regulations on driving behavior, including speed limits, passing regulations, and seat belt requirements. Driving while intoxicated with alcohol is illegal in all U.S. jurisdictions. Most U.S. vehicles have a semi-automatic transmission; only 3.9 percent have a manual transmission.

The U.S. has an extensive system of highways, including the National Highway System begun in the early 20th century and the Interstate Highway System planned in the 1950s. U.S. infrastructure and road rules tend to privilege cars over other road users such as cyclists and pedestrians. Cars and driving have been a major component of American culture, particularly since the 1950s.

Congestion is oftentimes claimed to be a major problem in many American cities, wasting an estimated 4.2 billion hours and 2.8 billion U.S. gallons (11 million cubic meters) of fuel annually as of 2007, costing the U.S. economy $87.2 billion.

The National Highway Traffic Safety Administration writes and enforces the Federal Motor Vehicle Safety Standards. In 2020, there were an estimated 38,680 traffic fatalities in the U.S. The U.S. traffic fatality rate was 1.1 per 100 million vehicle miles traveled as of 2019.

The U.S. has a well-developed trucking industry that serves the country's economy by transporting goods. Operating trucks and other large vehicles requires a commercial driver's license.

== Commuting from the suburbs ==
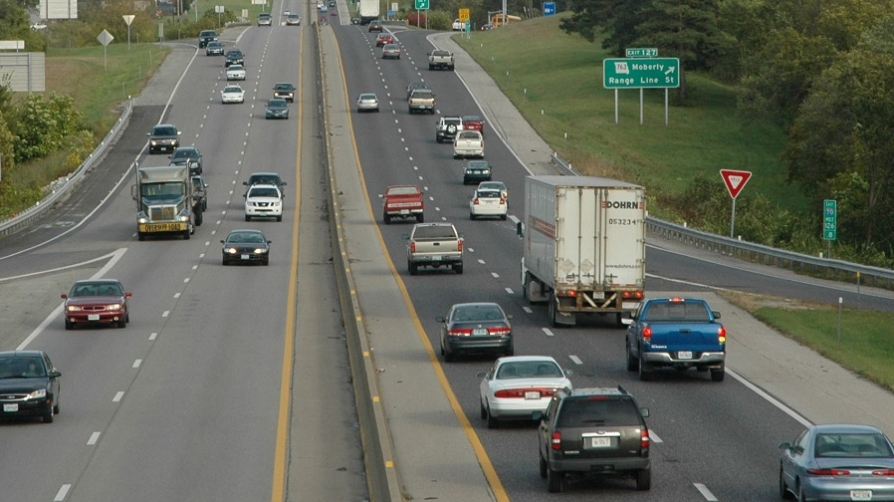
Cars driving on I-70 in Missouri

It is not uncommon for Americans to commute more than an hour each way to work via car, and 77% of Americans drive alone to their workplace, while an additional 11% carpool.

The mean traveled distance might depend on the age group: while the mean is 13,476 miles yearly (about 20,000 kilometers), it is only 4,785 miles (7,701 kilometers) for 65+ females, but can reach 18,858 miles (30,000 kilometers) for 35–54 males.

After World War II, land developers began to buy land just outside the city limits of larger cities to build mass quantities of inexpensive tract houses. One of the first examples of planned suburbanization is Levittown, Pennsylvania. These suburbs were made possible by the car, and the suburbs made the car a necessity. By the end of the 1950s, one-third of Americans lived in the suburbs. Eleven of the United States's twelve largest cities recorded a declining population during the decade, with a consequent loss in tax revenues and city culture. Only Los Angeles, a center for the car culture, gained population.

== The rules of the road ==
Although each state sets its own traffic laws, most laws are the same or similar throughout the country. Traffic is required to keep to the right, known as a right-hand traffic pattern. The exception is the US Virgin Islands, where people drive on the left.

Most states in the United States enforce priority to the right at uncontrolled intersections, where motorists must yield to the right.

The main US specificities compared to foreign rules includes some specific US rules:

- 4 stops with priority to the first vehicle
- Red light located after the junction rather than before

=== Speed limits ===
Maximum speed limits in the United States vary by state from 60 to 85 mph. (Washington D.C. has a maximum speed limit of 55 mph.)

Speed limits are set by each state, territory, county, or municipality, on the roads within their jurisdiction. The maximum speed limit on rural two-lane roads ranges from 50 mph (80 km/h) in parts of the northeast to 75 mph (121 km/h) in parts of Texas. On rural Interstate Highways and other freeways, the speed limit ranges from 60 mph (97 km/h) in Hawaii to 85 mph (137 km/h) in parts of Texas. All roads in the United States have a speed limit, but it is not always posted (especially in rural areas).

=== Lane discipline and overtaking ===
Overtaking, usually called "passing", is legal on all four or more lane roads and on most two-lane roads with sufficient sight distance. On two-lane roads, one must pass to the left of the overtaken vehicle unless that vehicle is preparing to make a left turn, in which case the vehicle must be passed on the right.

Passing on the left means that the overtaking vehicle must enter the oncoming lane. This should only be done in a legal passing zone, designated by either a dashed yellow center-line (indicating that passing is legal in both directions) or a solid line paired with a dashed line (indicating that passing is only legal for traffic adjacent to the broken line). A solid double yellow line indicates that passing is illegal in both directions.

The Interstate highway system is the largest national controlled-access highway network in the world, in 2018. It connects many contiguous states.

=== Seat belt use ===
49 states and the District of Columbia have passed laws requiring seat belt use by at least all occupants of the front seat. New Hampshire is the only state with no such requirement for adults (anyone under eighteen must use a seat belt).

== Drunk driving ==
Percentage of US car crash fatalities where driver blood alcohol level was .01 and above, 1999–2012

Drunk driving is driving a motor vehicle while under the influence of alcohol, drugs, or both, to the degree that mental and motor skills are impaired. It is illegal in all jurisdictions within the U.S. The specific criminal offense is usually called driving under the influence [of alcohol or other drugs] (DUI), and in some states driving while intoxicated (DWI), operating while impaired (OWI), or operating a vehicle under the influence (OVI). Such laws may also apply to boating or flying an aircraft. This applies to all vehicles, which can include farm machinery and horse-drawn carriages.

In the United States, the National Highway Traffic Safety Administration (NHTSA) estimates that 17,941 people died in 2006 in alcohol-related collisions, representing 40% of total traffic deaths in the United States. NHTSA states 275,000 were injured in alcohol-related accidents in 2003.

The Bureau of Justice Statistics estimated that in 1996, local law enforcement agencies made 1,467,300 arrests nationwide for driving under the influence of alcohol, compared to 1,900,000 such arrests during the peak year in 1983. The arrest rate for alcohol-related offenses among Native Americans was more than double that for the total population during 1996, and almost 4 in 10 Native Americans held in local jails had been charged with a public order offense, most commonly driving while intoxicated.

In 1997, an estimated 513,200 DWI offenders were under correctional supervision, down from 593,000 in 1990 and up from 270,100 in 1986. The most at risk are the younger people. In 2015, drivers with a BAC of 0.08% or higher are involved in a fatal crash; three in 10 were between 21 and 24 years old (28%).

NHTSA defines fatal collisions as "alcohol-related" if they believe the driver, a passenger, or non-motorist (such as a pedestrian or pedal cyclist) had a blood alcohol content (BAC) of 0.01 or greater. NHTSA defines nonfatal collisions as alcohol-related if the accident report indicates evidence of alcohol present. NHTSA specifically notes that alcohol-related does not necessarily mean a driver or non occupant was tested for alcohol and that the term does not indicate a collision or fatality was caused by the presence of alcohol.

On average, about 60% of the BAC values are missing or unknown. To analyze what they believe is the complete data, statisticians simulate BAC information. Drivers with a BAC of 0.10 are 6 to 12 times more likely to get into a fatal crash or injury than drivers with no alcohol.

== Driver's license ==
A driving license, typically called a "driver's license", is required to operate a motor vehicle on any public road in the United States. This license is issued by the authority of individual states (including Washington, D.C. and all territories). Drivers are normally required to obtain a license from their state of residence, and all states recognize each other's licenses for temporary visitors subject to normal age requirements.

Most states allow people to drive unaccompanied once they have reached the age of sixteen. A state may suspend an individual's driving privilege within its borders for traffic violations. Many states share a common system of license classes, with some exceptions, and commercial license classes are standardized by the federal law of 49 CFR part 383.

== Traffic signs ==
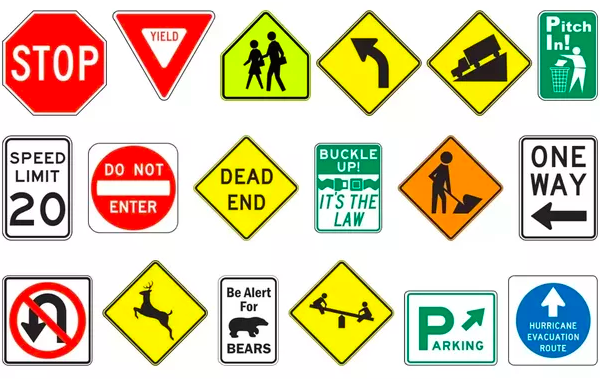
Examples of traffic signs

To convey the message immediately, the roadway signs in the US use symbols rather than words. The use of symbols avoids any language barriers, and can be instant communication for drivers and pedestrians in order to manage the transportation and the traffic safety.

According to Federal Highway Administration, it states “the color of roadway signs is an important indicator of the information they contain. The use of red on signs is limited to stop, yield, and prohibition signs. A white background indicates a regulatory sign; yellow conveys a general warning message; green shows permitted traffic movements or directional guidance; fluorescent yellow/green indicates pedestrian crossings and school zones; orange is used for warning and guidance in roadway work zones; coral is used for incident management signs; blue indicates road user services, tourist information, and evacuation routes; and brown is for guidance to sites of public recreation or cultural interest.

Sign shape can also alert roadway users to the type of information displayed on a sign. Traffic regulations are conveyed in signs that are rectangular with the longer direction vertical or square. Additional regulatory signs are octagons for stop and inverted triangles for yield. Diamond-shaped signs signify warnings. Rectangular signs with the longer direction horizontal provide guidance information. Pentagons indicate school zones. A circular sign warns of a railroad crossing."

== Environmental impact of driving vehicles ==
Eco-driving has featured reduction of CO_{2} emission reduction and revealed to lead one of best climate change strategies. The investigation of Eco-driving is consistent with the assessment of accelerating and decelerating under varying traffic and environmental volume and composition. Using micro-simulation, they analyzed the effects of Eco-Driving on network-wide traffic and environmental performance at the speed of 30 km/h.

It shows that increasing uses of Eco-Driving in certain road networks significantly affect a cause of traffic congestion and heavy traffic at the investigated roads. As a result, it causes an increase in CO_{2} emissions of up to 18%. Using Eco-Driving under limited speed and control of acceleration and deceleration can possibly affect CO_{2} emissions.

Several pollutants can be made by car-driving such as carbon dioxide, carbon monoxide, sulfur oxides, nitrogen oxides, hydrocarbon, and lead. They pollute the environment and affect human health. Carbon dioxide is the dominant greenhouse gas that is one of the causes of global warming. It includes flooding, droughts, storms, and disruption of the ecosystem. Carbon monoxide implores the flow of oxygen in the blood to the brain and other body parts. It affects people with heart disease and the central nervous system.

Sulfur oxides are the cause of acid rain that damages the nature and human health. It particularly aggravates heart and lung diseases in children and the elderly. Nitrogen oxides are the main ingredients in the formation of acid rain and ground-level ozone that contributes to the global warming. Hydrocarbons are pollutants of air toxics and hazardous to the lung and other body parts. It causes cancer and birth defects. Finally, high-lead level in the air can damage organs and affect the blood, nerves, brains, and heart. The urban areas relatively have higher traffic density, so they tend to have a higher lead level and more risk to health.

== Risk and safety performance ==
In 2020 there were 106% more road fatalities in the US than in the European Union, with nearly 38,680 in the US and nearly 18,800 in the EU.

There are 7.3 people killed per billion / 100 million vehicle kilometers traveled in 2016.

The U.S. traffic fatality rate fell to 1.08 deaths per 100 million miles traveled for the first half of 2018.

Only 19% of people in the U.S. live in rural areas, and 30% of the VMT (vehicle miles traveled) occur in rural areas, but half of the crash deaths occur in those rural areas: while there are 0.87 deaths per million miles traveled in urban area, there are 1.93 deaths per million miles traveled in rural areas.

Killed by traveled km 2016

* Source: OCDE.

The USA national strategy and target is 6.34 killed per 100 million vehicle kilometers traveled in end 2019.

In the first quarter 2022, fatalities in the USA will reach a level never reached since 2002.

== Specific behavior ==
When a driver is followed by a lighting police car, the driver should stop their car on the right and keep their hands on the wheel and keep their hands visible while not moving and not exiting of the vehicle.

For tourists, in case of accident it is preferable to call the police (911) rather than to help people who have been hurt, and to stay in that place.

== Heavy vehicles ==
For some heavy vehicles, a commercial driver's license is required, while a regular driver license is required for remaining vehicles.

== Insurance ==
Most states require a motor vehicle owner to carry some minimum level of liability insurance.

Consumers may be protected by different levels of coverage depending on which insurance policy they purchase. Coverage is sometimes seen as 20/40/15 or 100/300/100. The first two numbers seen are for medical coverage. In the 100/300 example, the policy will pay $100,000 per person up to $300,000 total for all people. The last number covers property damage.

This property damage can cover the other person's vehicle or anything that you hit and damage as a result of the accident. In some states you must purchase Personal Injury Protection which covers medical bills, time lost at work, and many other things.

== See also ==
- Environmental impact of transportation
- Numbered Highways in the United States
- Transportation in the United States
- Transportation safety in the United States
