= Boulevard rule =

Right-of-way principle of American traffic law

The boulevard rule is a principle in United States traffic law which states that the driver of a vehicle entering a highway from a smaller road or entrance (called the unfavored driver) must stop and yield the right of way to all highway traffic (the favored drivers). The rule often comes into play in road accident cases, when a court must determine if a driver is negligent in causing a collision, due to his breach of the duty of care imposed by the rule on the unfavored driver.

== State laws ==
Maryland is among the U.S. states which follow this rule, but not all states have similar provisions in statutes or case law.

New York applies the rule to traffic entering public roads from private driveways or alleys, but not where public roads intersect.

== See also ==
- Priority to the right
