= Any Bonds Today? =

1942 propaganda song

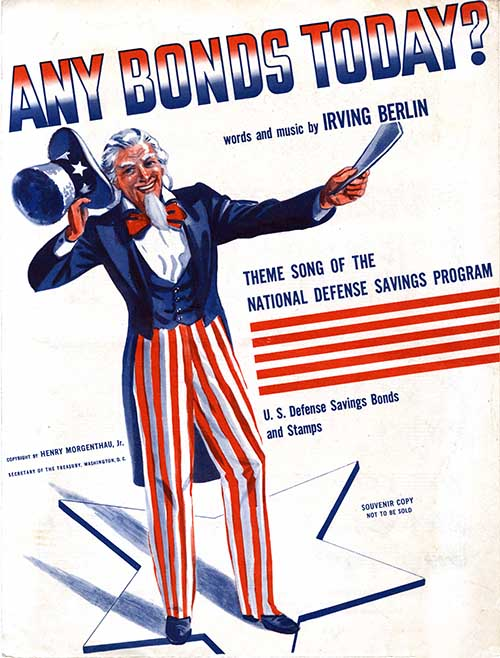
Cover image of 1941 sheet music

"Any Bonds Today?" is a song written by Irving Berlin, featured in a 1942 animated propaganda film starring Bugs Bunny. Both were used to sell war bonds during World War II.

== Song ==
"Any Bonds Today?" was based on Berlin's own "Any Yams Today," sung by Ginger Rogers in 1938's Carefree, which in turn was a modified version of "Any Love Today," which he wrote in 1931 but was not recorded.

Berlin wrote the tune "at the request" of Henry Morgenthau Jr., then U.S. Secretary of the Treasury, to promote the Treasury Department's defense bond and savings stamp drive, the National Defense Savings Program. The United States Treasury adopted the piece as the official song of the National Defense Savings Program in 1941. Its copyright, held by Morgenthau, is dated June 16, 1941.

Barry Wood introduced the song (along with another Berlin composition called "Arms for the Love of America") on Arsenal Day, June 10, 1941, at the War College in Washington, D.C.; he also recorded the song in the same week for RCA Victor. Wood's performance of the song was the first broadcast on radio, "in late June 1941"; it was also performed by the Andrews Sisters, the Tommy Dorsey Orchestra, Dick Robertson, Kay Kyser, and Gene Autry in the 1942 film Home in Wyomin'.

Berlin signed over his royalty payments from the song to the war bond drive, as he did with several of his songs during the war.

== Cartoon ==
Bugs Bunny
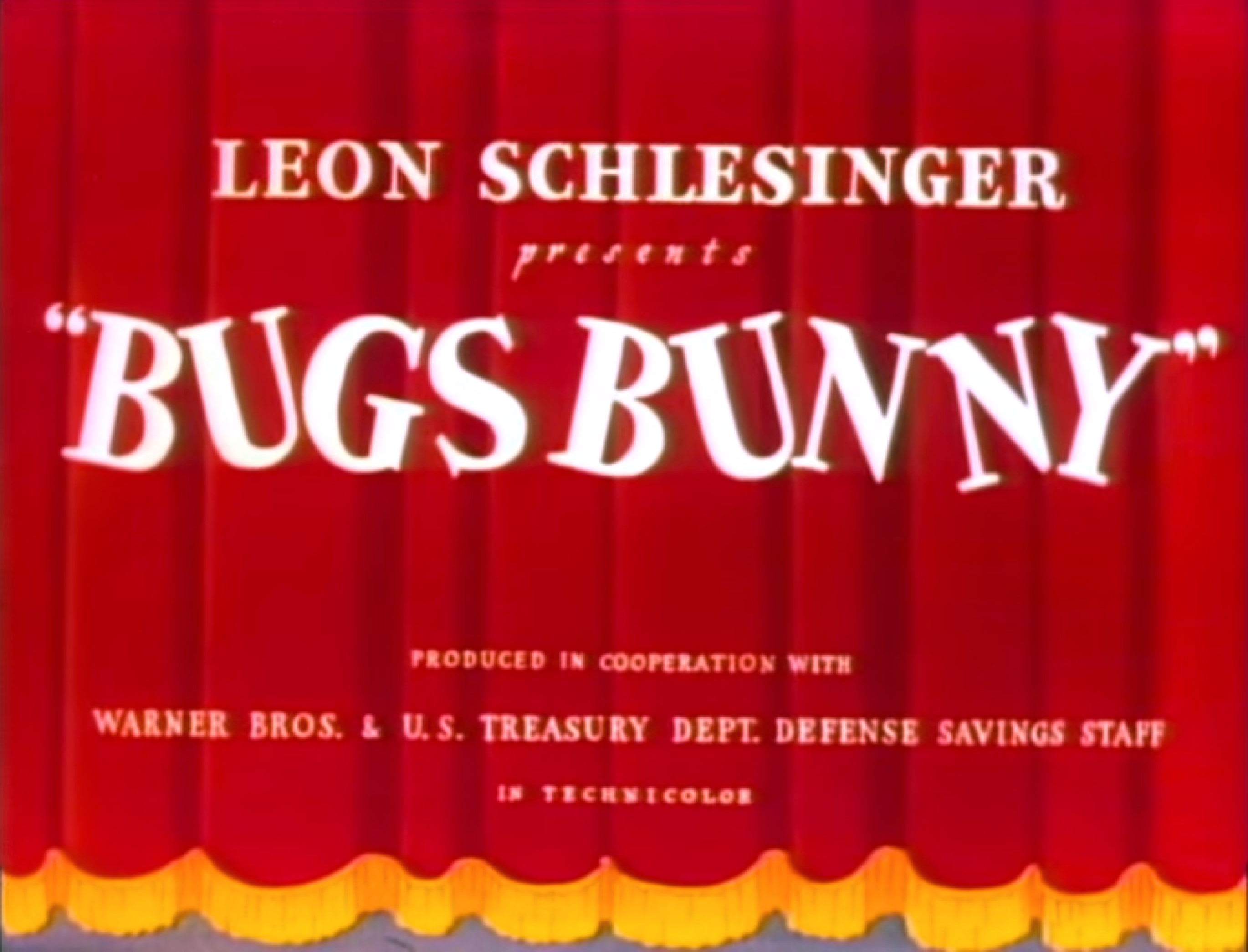
- Directed by: Robert Clampett
- Written by: Robert Clampett
- Produced by: Leon Schlesinger
- Animation by: Virgil Ross; Robert McKimson; Gerry Chiniquy; Rod Scribner
- Color process: Technicolor
- Production company: Leon Schlesinger Productions
- Distributed by: Warner Bros. Pictures
- Release date: April 2, 1942
- Running time: 1:38
- Country: United States
- Language: English

A 90-second cartoon, commissioned by the Treasury and produced by Leon Schlesinger Productions, was designed to encourage movie theater audiences to buy defense bonds and stamps. Its title card identifies it as Bugs Bunny, but it is more widely known as "Any Bonds Today?" It was neither considered a Looney Tunes nor Merrie Melodies cartoon.

Bob Clampett wrote and directed the film, which started production in late November 1941 and was completed eight days after the attack on Pearl Harbor. According to an article of The Hollywood Reporter, it took three weeks to complete. Counting from the drawing of the first sketch to the shipping of the first print. The paper reported that production would typically last two months. It was reportedly produced "free of charge".

In it, Bugs Bunny approaches the audience while fife-playing "The Girl I Left Behind Me" on his carrot. He then sings a portion of Berlin's song against a patriotic backdrop, at one point going into a blackface parody of Al Jolson. For the song's last refrain, he is joined by Porky Pig in a Navy uniform, and Elmer Fudd in Army garb. The short ends with a graphic encouraging the audience "For defense, buy United States Savings Bonds and Stamps". Another graphic (or snipe) briefly followed, reminding audiences they could buy bonds and stamps "At This Theatre".

=== Context ===
The cartoon was initially conceived to promote the sales of "defense bonds", which were renamed war bonds by the spring of 1942. Between feature films, or between the feature films and the animated shorts, the lights of the movie theater came on and ushers collected donations from the audience to help finance the war effort. Bonds and stamps were also available at the box office during the war.

== Sources ==
- Cohen, Karl F. (2004), "Censorship of Theatrical Animation", Forbidden Animation: Censored Cartoons and Blacklisted Animators in America, McFarland & Company, ISBN 978-0786420322
- Shull, Michael S.; Wilt, David E. (2004), "Filmography 1941", Doing Their Bit: Wartime American Animated Short Films, 1939-1945, McFarland & Company, ISBN 978-0786481699
- Sigall, Martha (2005). "The Boys of Termite Terrace". Living Life Inside the Lines: Tales from the Golden Age of Animation. University Press of Mississippi. ISBN 9781578067497.

== See also ==
- List of animated films in the public domain in the United States
- List of World War II short films
- List of Bugs Bunny cartoons

Preceded by The Wabbit Who Came to Supper	Bugs Bunny Cartoons; 1942	Succeeded by The Wacky Wabbit
