= Kent Rogers =

American actor (1923–1944)

- Rogers in All-American Co-Ed (1941)
- Born: Kent Byron Rogers; July 31, 1923; Houston, Texas, U.S.
- Died: July 9, 1944 (aged 20); Hawaii, U.S.
- Occupation: Actor
- Years active: 1937–1944

Kent Byron Rogers (July 31, 1923 – July 9, 1944) was an American actor who appeared in several live-action features and shorts, and worked as a voice actor in radio and animated cartoons.

== Career ==
For Warner Bros. Cartoons, Rogers portrayed several Hollywood stars in Hollywood Steps Out, and lent his voice to The Heckling Hare, Porky's Pastry Pirates, Horton Hatches the Egg, The Squawkin' Hawk and Super-Rabbit. Rogers also provided the original voice of Beaky Buzzard in Bugs Bunny Gets the Boid and The Bashful Buzzard. He also provided the voice of Junior Bear in Bugs Bunny and the Three Bears, the initial 1944 entry of Chuck Jones' The Three Bears series.

For Walter Lantz Productions he voiced Woody Woodpecker in five theatrical cartoon shorts released from 1942 to 1943.

Rogers also appeared occasionally on radio sitcoms, generally doing one-off characters. In 1941, he had a rare on-camera role in the film All-American Co-Ed as Henry, a boy who had a talent for doing impressions.

== Death ==
Rogers enlisted as an ensign in the United States Navy in December 1942. He was killed in the crash of a training flight in Hawaii on July 9, 1944. Stan Freberg, who arrived in Hollywood just as Rogers had died, would be hired to replace Rogers, including in the role of Junior Bear. Mel Blanc took over as the voice of Beaky Buzzard, though that character's appearances were limited after Rogers' death.

Rogers is buried in the National Memorial Cemetery of the Pacific in Honolulu, Hawaii.

== Filmography ==
| Year | Title | Role | Notes |
|---|---|---|---|
| 1937 | Make a Wish | Summer Camp Kid | Film debut, uncredited |
| 1937 | Boy of the Streets | Gang Member 'Red' | Uncredited |
| 1937 | Headin' East | Boy in Gym | Uncredited |
| 1938 | Reformatory | Inmate | Uncredited |
| 1938 | Boys Town | Tailor | Uncredited |
| 1938 | The Storm | Boy in Gym | Uncredited |
| 1939 | Wanted: No Master | Justice of the Peace | Voice, uncredited |
| 1939 | Streets of New York | Gang Member | Uncredited |
| 1940 | Northwest Passage | Odiorne Towne | Uncredited |
| 1940 | Adventures of Tom Thumb Jr. | Grasshopper | Voice, uncredited |
| 1940 | Those Were the Days! | Jimmy Skelton | Uncredited |
| 1940 | The Bookworm Turns | Mr. Hyde | Voice, uncredited |
| 1940 | Military Academy | Billings | Uncredited |
| 1940 | Syncopated Sioux | Punchy / Cowboy / Indians | Voice, uncredited |
| 1941 | Goofy Groceries | Henry Gorilla / Crab | Voice, uncredited |
| 1941 | Farm Frolics | Henry Ant | Voice, uncredited |
| 1941 | Hollywood Steps Out | Mickey Rooney / James Cagney / James Stewart / J. Edgar Hoover / Henry Fonda / Cary Grant / Edward G. Robinson / Clark Gable / Bing Crosby / Lewis Stone / Ned Sparks / Peter Lorre / Groucho Marx / Kay Kyser | Voice, uncredited |
| 1941 | The Heckling Hare | Willoughby | Voice, uncredited |
| 1941 | Life Begins for Andy Hardy | Tough Boy | Uncredited |
| 1941 | Speaking of Animals Down on the Farm | Various | Voice, uncredited |
| 1941 | Speaking of Animals in the Zoo | Monkey / Elephant / Lion / Stork / Fox / Tortoise | Voice, uncredited |
| 1941 | All-American Co-ed | Henry | |
| 1942 | Porky's Pastry Pirates | James Cagney Bee | Voice, uncredited |
| 1942 | The Hollywood Matador | Woody Woodpecker / Oxnard the Terribull / Elevator Hick | Voice, uncredited |
| 1942 | The Hams That Couldn't Be Cured | Algernon Wolf / Pigs / Sheriff | Voice, uncredited |
| 1942 | Horton Hatches the Egg | Horton the Elephant / Peter Lorre Fish / Giraffe / Rosebud | Voice, uncredited |
| 1942 | Nutty Pine Cabin | Beavers | Voice, uncredited |
| 1942 | Hobby Horse-Laffs | Strongfort / Giggleswick / Potts | Voice, uncredited |
| 1942 | Speaking of Animals and Their Families | Hippo Baby | Voice, uncredited |
| 1942 | Ace in the Hole | Woody Woodpecker / GI Sergeant | Voice, uncredited |
| 1942 | Wacky Blackout | Woodpecker / Baby Bird | Voice, uncredited |
| 1942 | Bugs Bunny Gets the Boid | Beaky Buzzard | Voice, uncredited |
| 1942 | Pigeon Patrol | Homer Pigeon / Carrier Pigeon / Induction Officer | Voice, uncredited |
| 1942 | The Squawkin' Hawk | Henery Hawk | Voice, uncredited |
| 1942 | Blitz Wolf | Devils | Voice, uncredited |
| 1942 | The Early Bird Dood It! | Worm | Voice, uncredited |
| 1942 | Andy Panda's Victory Garden | Caterpillar | Voice, uncredited |
| 1942 | The Hep Cat | Rosebud | Voice, uncredited |
| 1942 | The Loan Stranger | Woody Woodpecker / Hudson C. Dann | Voice, uncredited |
| 1942 | Road to Morocco | Male Camel | Voice, uncredited |
| 1942 | Speaking of Animals in South America | Spider Monkey / Male Parrot / Monkey #2 / Stork #1 / Condor / Anteater / Barnacle Goose | Voice, uncredited |
| 1943 | The Screwball | Woody Woodpecker / Policeman / "Ouches" / Man in Seat / Vendor / Ballplayer / Batter / Worm / Umpire / Catcher | Voice, uncredited |
| 1943 | Tortoise Wins by a Hare | Dumb Rabbit with Telescope | Voice, uncredited |
| 1943 | Super-Rabbit | Professor Canafrazz | Voice, uncredited |
| 1943 | Swing Your Partner | Homer Pigeon / Hank / Laughter | Voice, uncredited |
| 1943 | Red Hot Riding Hood | Wolf (some lines) | Voice, uncredited |
| 1943 | The Dizzy Acrobat | Woody Woodpecker | Voice, uncredited |
| 1943 | Who Killed Who? | Victim / Red Skeleton / Falling Body / Santa Claus | Voice, uncredited |
| 1943 | One Ham's Family | Narrator / Junior / Wolf | Voice, uncredited |
| 1943 | What's Buzzin' Buzzard | Joe Buzzard / Jimmy Durante Vulture's Stomach / Rabbit | Voice, uncredited |
| 1943 | Speaking of Animals Tails of the Border | | Voice, uncredited |
| 1943 | Speaking of Animals at the Cage Door Carteen | Parrot / Polar Bear / Monkey / Moron / Buzzard / Stork / Eagle | Voice, uncredited |
| 1944 | Bugs Bunny and the Three Bears | Junyer Bear | Voice, uncredited |
| 1944 | Who's Who in Animal Land | Fox / Llama / Donkey / Singing Bull | Voice, uncredited |
| 1944 | Speaking of Animals as Babies | Monkey / Henry Ostrich talking / Baboon Baby / Papa Goat / Goat Kid / Lion Cubs / Cat Father / Giraffe | Voice, uncredited |
| 1944 | Speaking of Animals: Monkey Business | Monkeys | Voice, uncredited |
| 1944 | Speaking of Animals in a Harem | Tiny Tim | Voice, uncredited |
| 1945 | The Bashful Buzzard | Beaky Buzzard / Farmer | Voice, uncredited, released posthumously |
| 1945 | Speaking of Animals from A to Zoo | Monkey / Fox / Tortoise / Lion / Stork / Buffalo | Voice, uncredited, final film role, released posthumously |
