= Swing with Bing =

Comedy short film

Swing with Bing is a 1940 short comedic film of a male and female comedy duo covering a professional and celebrity golf tournament. It is a Universal Pictures release. Herbert Polesie directed. The film survives.

It features Bing Crosby golfing and singing. The film is set on location at the Rancho Santa Fe Pro-Am Golf Tournament. The film was produced by the Professional Golf Association of American and Universal. The short film Don't Hook Now was a follow-up.
