= Bugs Bunny Gets the Boid =

1942 film by Robert Clampett

- Title card
- Directed by: Robert Clampett
- Story by: Warren Foster
- Produced by: Leon Schlesinger
- Starring: Mel Blanc; Sara Berner; Kent Rogers
- Music by: Carl W. Stalling
- Animation by: Rod Scribner
- Color process: Technicolor
- Production company: Leon Schlesinger Productions
- Distributed by: Warner Bros. Pictures
- Release date: July 4, 1942
- Running time: 7 min
- Country: United States
- Language: English

Bugs Bunny Gets the Boid is a 1942 American animated comedy short film directed by Robert Clampett. It is part of the Merrie Melodies series, the fifteenth film to feature Bugs Bunny and the first appearance of Beaky Buzzard, here named Killer.

The title is a Brooklyn-accented way of saying "gets the bird", which can refer to an obscene gesture, or as simply the "Bronx cheer"; in this case, it is also used metaphorically, as Bugs Bunny "gets" the bird (Beaky) by playing a trick.

== Plot ==
A shy and slow buzzard named Killer is tasked by his mother to catch a rabbit for dinner. He doesn't want to leave his mother, but she kicks him out of the nest. As he flies, he sings "My mama done told me, bring back something for dinner." He spots Bugs Bunny reading "Hare Raising Stories" and dives to catch him. Bugs imitates an air traffic controller guiding a B-19 to land, causing the buzzard to crash, becoming unable to move or speak.

When he recovers, Killer reveals his intention to have Bugs for dinner. Bugs, in a playful disguise, says he has to tidy up a bit. After a while, Killer realizes he's being tricked and sticks his head into Bugs' hole to see what's going on. Bugs pops up with a shower cap and lipstick on and a towel held around himself and scolds "You naughty, naughty boy!", then whips his with the towel.

Killer chases Bugs, but Bugs grabs him by his topknot and tickles his Adam's apple. The buzzard grabs Bugs and flies away, but is tickled by one of his own feathers and releases him. Bugs falls into a hole in the ground surrounded by bleached bones and momentarily thinks he is hurt, but soon realizes that he is unharmed, saying "Aw, I knew it all da time," and walks away.

The two scuffle, which turns into jitterbugging together to "Don't Sit Under the Apple Tree". After a spin, Killer ends up in the same bone-surrounded hole that Bugs had been in, and calls out in panic for his mother, who promptly arrives. She initially thinks that Bugs has harmed her son, but Bugs reassures her and pulls him out, revealing he is unharmed.

Relieved and grateful, the mother buzzard declares Bugs to be her hero, kissing him on the lips, which causes Bugs to blush red and stammer in embarrassment and shyness, behaving just like her son.

== Voice cast ==
- Mel Blanc as Bugs Bunny / Young Buzzards
- Kent Rogers as Beaky Buzzard, called "Killer" by his mother
- Sara Berner as Mama Buzzard

== Reception ==
Charles Carney, former Warner Bros. writer and editor, writes, "Clampett, one of the midwives of Bugs's deepening character, proceeds at his trademark breakneck speed... Bugs would go on to outwit a catalog of adversaries throughout the years, from the merely dumb to the diabolical. But his struggles with Killer... remain a classic of two memorable young characters in a comic battle for survival."

A contemporary review in The Film Daily said, "More hilarious adventures of Bugs Bunny are recorded herein to the complete satisfaction of young and old... This Technicolor cartoon is loaded with solid laughs."

== Home media ==
Bugs Bunny Gets the Boid was released on DVD in 2003 as part of Looney Tunes Golden Collection: Volume 1 and the first Spotlight Collection, and on Blu-ray in 2012 as part of Looney Tunes Platinum Collection: Volume 2, and in 2020 as part of Bugs Bunny 80th Anniversary Collection.

Having been theatrically released alongside the 1942 film Yankee Doodle Dandy, it has been also included on that DVD.

== See also ==
- Bugs Bunny filmography
- Looney Tunes and Merrie Melodies filmography (1940–1949)

Preceded by Hold the Lion, Please	Bugs Bunny Cartoons; 1942	Succeeded by Fresh Hare
