= Priority to the right =

Road rule

Priority to the right is a right-of-way system in right-hand traffic, in which the driver of a vehicle is required to give way to vehicles approaching from the right at intersections. The system is stipulated in Article 18.4.a of the Vienna Convention on Road Traffic for countries where traffic keeps to the right and applies to all situations where it is not overridden by priority signs (including uncontrolled intersections), including side roads and roundabouts (but not paths or earth-tracks).

== Usage ==
The system is widely used in countries with right-hand traffic, including most European countries. What varies, however, is the prevalence of uncontrolled intersections. In some countries, the right of way at virtually all but the most minor road junctions is controlled by the display of priority vs. stop / yield signs or by traffic lights, while in others (such as France) priority-to-the-right is sometimes applied even at intersections with heavy traffic such as the Place de l'Étoile (around the Arc de Triomphe) and on the Boulevard Périphérique (Paris ring road).

Most states in the United States and provinces in Canada enforce priority-to-the-right at uncontrolled four-way intersections, where motorists must yield to the right, but only if they arrive at the same time. Uncontrolled intersections are less common in North America, and municipalities increasingly have introduced all way stops, traffic signals and other designations such as multiple lane right-of-way or paved vs. unpaved roads as a means of controlling the intersections to decrease the likelihood of a collision and to make it easier to determine liability in the event of an accident. Some countries use the priority-to-the-right rule, despite driving on the left. Australia uses the priority-to-the-right rule at four-way intersections where the roads all have equal priority, but specific rules apply for T-intersections. Singapore and New Zealand also use priority-to-the-right, as well as priority to vehicles going straight and turning vehicles to give way to vehicles going straight.

=== Local abolition in Belgium ===
B1: Give way.

B5: Stop and give way.

In Belgium, experts from the Flemish Automobile Association (VAB) argue for the abolition of priority to the right. They claim it is an outdated rule that too often causes accidents, because people assume that they will receive priority, and therefore that it is safe to cross. Across the country in 2017, more than 15,000 collisions took place at intersections with priority to the right (on average 42 times a day); this amounted to almost 5% of all damage claims, according to insurance companies federation Assuralia. In the 2010s, therefore, a number of Flemish municipalities (including Bekkevoort, Dilbeek, Geel, Gooik, Lede, Linter, Lubbeek, Tielt-Winge and Wervik) decided to reduce the number of intersections where priority is given to the right and to designate more priority roads by placing additional traffic signs, namely inverted triangles (B1, which oblige road users to give priority to others before they cross themselves) and stop signs (B5, which oblige road users to stop at the intersection and give priority to others before they cross themselves). The municipality of Glabbeek went so far as to abolish all intersections with priority to the right in December 2017. In the first half of 2018 in Glabbeek, two accidents out of nine were attributed to defying a yield or stop sign, while in the same period in the previous year, 18 out of 22 accidents were related to right-of-way.

== Signage ==
No signage is necessary to enforce priority, and is sometimes not provided. Signs may be provided to indicate whether a given lane has priority or must give way.

Intersection ahead in which priority must be given to vehicles on the right.

Intersection ahead where vehicles on the right must give way

Priority road (priority at all following intersections up to an end-of-priority-road, yield or stop sign). In some countries, the meaning was changed to the next intersection only.

End of priority road (henceforth priority to the right applies at uncontrolled intersections)

Additional sign of a shape of the intersection and a definition of the priority.

== See also ==
- Boulevard rule
