= Hold the Lion, Please =

1942 film by Charles M. Jones

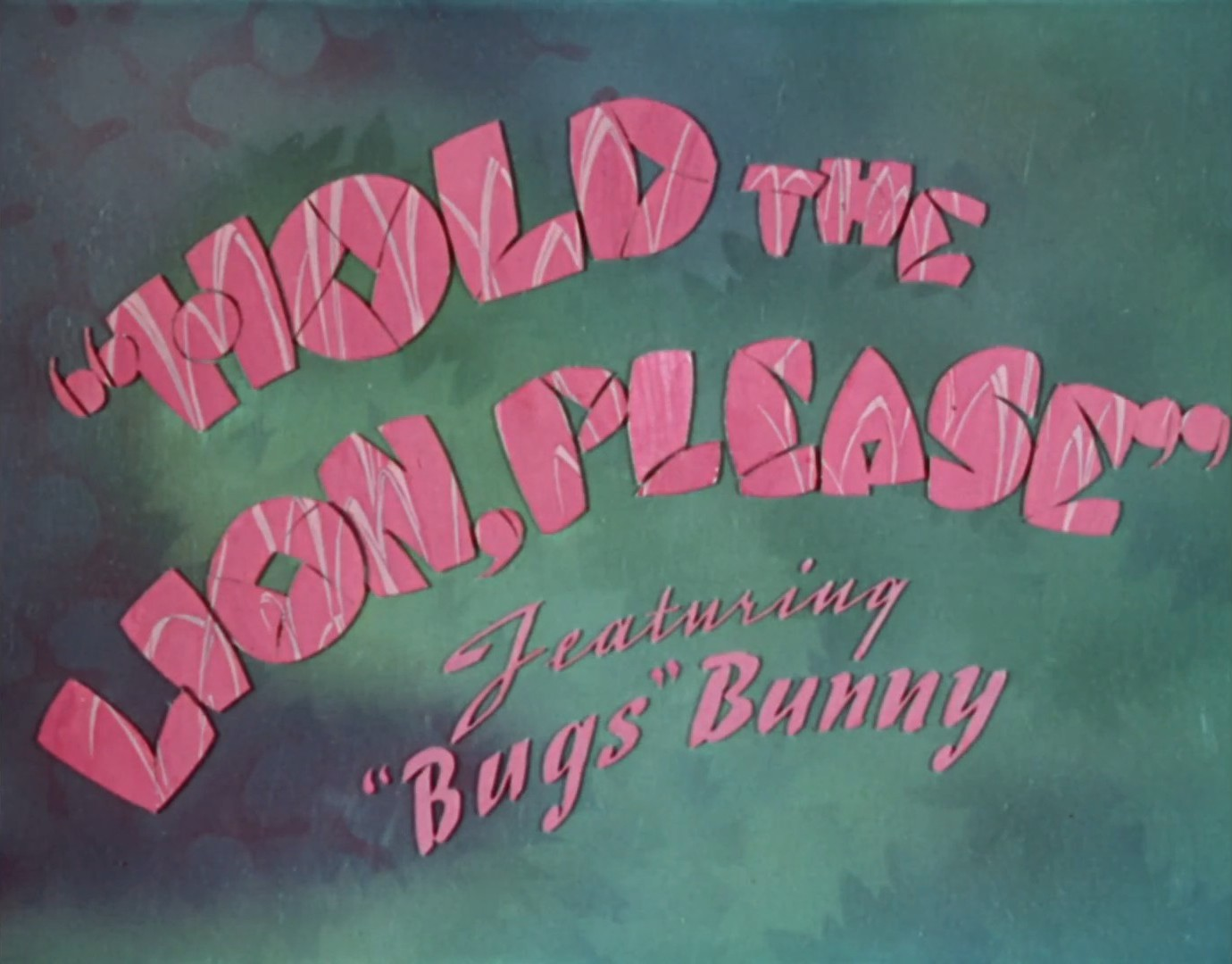
- Title card
- Directed by: Charles M. Jones
- Story by: Ted Pierce
- Produced by: Leon Schlesinger
- Starring: Mel Blanc; Tedd Pierce; Robert C. Bruce (all uncredited)
- Music by: Carl W. Stalling
- Animation by: Ken Harris
- Color process: Technicolor
- Production company: Leon Schlesinger Productions
- Distributed by: Warner Bros. Pictures
- Release date: June 6, 1942
- Running time: 8 min
- Country: United States
- Language: English

Hold the Lion, Please is a 1942 American animated comedy short film directed by Charles M. Jones. It was released on June 6, 1942. It is part of the Merrie Melodies series and the fourteenth cartoon to feature Bugs Bunny.

== Plot ==
A lion named Leo tries to prove he is still 'King of the Jungle' by hunting a small, defenseless animal. He chooses Bugs Bunny as his intended victim, but Leo soon finds out that, in a battle of wits, he's the defenseless one. However, Leo eventually gets Bugs under one paw while raising the other one, claws extended, and looking extremely angry; a truly frightened-looking Bugs could be facing his end.

Just then, Leo's wife, Hortense, calls him on Bugs' phone, and Leo immediately goes from ferocious to meek. After a brief conversation, Leo tells her that he's on his way home. After hanging up the phone, Leo apologizes to Bugs about not being able to "stay and kill him", and dashes home to Hortense. Initially, Bugs makes fun of Leo for his submissiveness to his wife, but it is quickly shown that Bugs is just as submissive to his own wife, Mrs Bugs Bunny (according to a sign behind her), whose presence sends her husband sheepishly slinking back into their rabbit hole. Mrs. Bunny then asks the audience, "Who wears the pants in this family?" before lifting up her skirt to show her literally wearing a pair of pants.

== Cast ==
- Mel Blanc as Bugs Bunny, Monkey, Giraffe, and Mrs. Bugs Bunny
- Tedd Pierce as Leo the Lion
- Robert C. Bruce as the Hippo

== See also ==
- Bugs Bunny filmography
- Looney Tunes and Merrie Melodies filmography (1940–1949)

Preceded by The Wacky Wabbit	Bugs Bunny Cartoons; 1942	Succeeded by Bugs Bunny Gets the Boid
