= My Little Duckaroo =

- Title card
- Directed by: Charles M. Jones
- Story by: Michael Maltese
- Starring: Mel Blanc
- Music by: Milt Franklyn
- Animation by: Ken Harris; Abe Levitow; Richard Thompson; Lloyd Vaughan; Ben Washam
- Layouts by: Maurice Noble
- Backgrounds by: Philip DeGuard
- Color process: Technicolor
- Production company: Warner Bros. Cartoons
- Distributed by: Warner Bros. Pictures
- Release date: November 27, 1954 (USA)
- Running time: 6 min, 40 sec.
- Language: English

My Little Duckaroo is a 1954 Warner Bros. Merrie Melodies theatrical cartoon short directed by Chuck Jones and written by Michael Maltese. The cartoon was released on November 27, 1954 and stars Daffy Duck and Porky Pig.

This cartoon in many ways resembles the 1951 short directed by Chuck Jones entitled Drip-Along Daffy. In this animated piece, upon seeing a wanted poster with a reward of $10,000.00 for the dead or alive capture of Nasty Canasta, Daffy sets out alongside his companion Porky and his trusty steed to retrieve the villain and collect the money.

The cartoon can be found on the sixth volume of the Looney Tunes Golden Collection, as well as the second volume of its Blu-ray Disc successor, the Platinum Collection (along with Drip-Along Daffy and Barbary Coast Bunny).

== Plot ==
Much like Drip-Along Daffy, this cartoon parodies the widely popular Westerns of the time period. The Masked Avenger (Daffy) and his sidekick Comedy Relief (Porky) ride along in the desert until they come across a poster offering $10,000 reward for Nasty Canasta, wanted dead or alive for crimes including horse stealing, candy stealing, gag stealing, sheriff scaring and square dancing in a round house. "This looks like a job for...the Masked Ee-venger", Daffy shouts. "And besides, it isn't the principle of the thing, it's the money."

Following large conspicuous signs literally pointing the way to (and at) to Canasta's hide-out, Daffy tells Porky to wait outside "whilst I go in and fix his little red wagon". Daffy bursts into the hideout, to find Canasta sitting peacefully at a table playing cards. He announces himself as the Masked Avenger, then as the Frisco Kid and later as Superguy, but Canasta pays no attention until Daffy offers advice on his card game, to which Canasta asks if Daffy plays cards. Challenged to join the game, Daffy departs and returns in new cowboy garb (but without the mask), confident of victory. What follows is the humiliation of Daffy again and again through different gags and challenges.

The first round of the card game is ended abruptly when Canasta literally cuts the deck of cards with a meat cleaver, nearly cutting off Daffy's hand as well. Daffy deals the cards, giving Canasta one and himself the rest of the deck. Canasta "wins" the hand when he pokes a pistol in Daffy's mouth and declares "I got a 3 of clubs." Daffy nervously says, "Beats me!"

The next scene opens with Canasta reading The Gravedigger's Joke Book by Burke and Hare, while Daffy attempts to roll a cigarette (ending up with just the paper in his mouth). Daffy challenges Canasta to an arm wrestling match, which Canasta easily wins, smashing Daffy into and through the table.

Porky appears and suggests to Daffy, "Why don't you plain old arrest him?" Daffy tries that, but when he puts Canasta in irons, Canasta effortlessly breaks the handcuffs, and when Daffy tries to take him away, he finds that he cannot move Canasta from the spot he is standing. Daffy then gets annoyed and angry, telling Canasta that he is going to give him a fist beating, with Porky encouraging Daffy (telling him to fix Canasta's "little red wagon"). However, Daffy's spunk ends badly for Daffy himself, as Canasta rips his shirt right off just by flexing his muscles before beating up Daffy. The house shakes as Porky sits outside whittling with a knife and a stick, saying things like "Oh, h-h-h-he'll murder him." Daffy then emerges from the house after a few seconds, dazed and staggering with slurred speech, proclaiming that he indeed fixed Canasta's little red wagon, followed by Daffy staggering outside the house with a shiny new red wagon ("I told you I'd fix his little red wagon. You should've seen it. The wheels were busted, the axle was all bent, and it needed a new coat of paint. Now...now I'm going home to Mother.").

== See also ==
- List of cartoons featuring Daffy Duck
- Porky Pig filmography
