= List of Duck Dodgers characters =

This is a list of characters from the American animated television series Duck Dodgers.

== Galactic Protectorate ==
=== Duck Dodgers ===
Captain Daffy Edgar Dumas Aloysius Eoghain "the Duck" Dodgers (voiced by Joe Alaskey) was a water boy for a college football team who was accidentally frozen for over three centuries and revived by Dr. I.Q. Hi in the middle of the 24th century. Through scheming and lies, he managed to trick everyone into believing he was a 21st-century hero. dodgers is arrogant, rude, selfish, greedy, lazy, cowardly, gullible, and not particularly intelligent. He occasionally displays surprisingly high levels of heroism and competence, suggesting that he is not quite as daft as he appears to be, although he mostly succeeds through dumb luck and the work of the Eager Young Space Cadet.

=== Cadet ===
Eager Young Space Cadet (voiced by Bob Bergen) is the faithful sidekick of Duck Dodgers. Cadet is loyal to Dodgers and looks up to him, seeing him as a father-figure in many ways. Cadet is also fairly successful as a ladies' man, often being the one who ends up with the woman Dodgers swoons over. He graduated summa cum laude from the Protectorate Academy. Very little else is known about his past, though one episode portrays him as being the prince of the planet Swinus 9.

=== I.Q. Hi ===
Dr. Ignatius Q. "I.Q." Hi (voiced by Richard McGonagle) is a scientist who revived Dodgers after he was frozen for three centuries. He is the Chief Scientist for the Galactic Protectorate and usually acts as a representative on Earth on behalf of the World President. Hi is responsible for giving missions to the team. Serious and hard-working, he is often irritated and frustrated with Dodgers's incompetent side, and doubts that Dodgers truly was a 21st-century hero.

Later episodes also show that I.Q. Hi owns an old castle inherited from his ancestors (which is later destroyed by Dodgers), enjoys lattes, fishing, and despite their rivalries, appears to be on friendly terms with Queen Tyr'ahnee. He also has a brother named Psy Q. Hi, who is a psychiatrist.

=== Captain Star Johnson ===
Captain Star Johnson is a member of the Space Protectorate who serves as a rival to Duck Dodgers. Johnson once took Dodgers to court over Dodger's incompetence. Since then, Johnson has been involved in freeing Mars from the military coup by General Z9 and searching for gangsters when Dodgers went missing for a brief period of time.

=== Captain Long ===
Captain Long (voiced by Michael Dorn) is a member of the Galactic Protectorate. He appeared in "The Fudd", where he was one of the victims of the Mother Fudd.

=== Captain Dallas Rodman ===
Captain Dallas Rodman (voiced by Frank Welker) is a member of the Galactic Protectorate. Rodman solely appears in the episode "The Best of Captains, The Worst of Captains", where he is nominated for Captain of the Year at the Galactic Protectorate's Captainee Awards.

=== Captain Aurora Soleil ===
Captain Aurora Soleil is a lieutenant in the Galactic Protectorate. At the Captainee Awards, Duck Dodgers and Star Johnson competed for her attention. At the awards, Soleil is promoted to Captain for her heroic actions.

=== Master Sergeant Emily Dickinson Jones ===
Master Sergeant Emily Dickinson Jones (voiced by Randy Savage) works at the Galactic Protectorate Training Academy on Earth. He is responsible for monitoring Duck Dodgers during his annual Protectorate Training Test, which Dodgers routinely avoids taking. Jones respects individuals who can think out of the box, which led him to let Dodgers pass the test despite the fact Dodgers managed to fail every one of the tests.

=== Bigfoot ===
Bigfoot (voiced by Michael Patrick McGill) is a maintenance supervisor who worked for the Protectorate and was the first being to receive cyborgan implants. He seems not to be very educated, as the only two words he says are "Duck" and "Stereo".

== Martian Empire ==
=== Queen Tyr'ahnee ===
Queen Tyr'ahnee (voiced by Tia Carrere) is the ruler of Mars. She is in love with Dodgers and, just like Cadet, believes him to be a true hero. She and Dodgers planned to marry until X-2 persuaded Dodgers to leave Tyr'ahnee. Tyr'ahnee never fully gets over her feelings for Dodgers, to the point of deserting X-2 at their wedding. She is shown to be good friends with I.Q. Hi, knowing and calling him by his first name, Ignatius, on many occasions.

=== Martian Commander X-2 ===
Martian Commander X-2 Marvin (voiced by Joe Alaskey) is the commander of the Martian military. He is never named outside his official capacity as the Commander (possibly High Commander) of the fleet of Mars. X-2 is Dodgers' archenemy, though X-2 considers Dodgers more of a nuisance than a true enemy. X-2 serves Tyr'ahnee, with whom he is infatuated and loyal to. His crush is not requited for most of the series, until in the end of the second season, when Tyr'ahnee kisses X-2 in the cheek after learning of his crush. Despite their rivalry, both Dodgers and X-2 have worked together in several occasions to fight a common foe.

=== Commander K-9 ===
Martian Commander K-9 (voiced by Frank Welker) is X-2's dog. He is loyal and loving and will do anything for his master. He'll always protect his master from danger, even if it makes K-9 look bad in front of him.

=== Martian General Z-9 ===
Martian General Z-9 (voiced by Corey Burton) is a Martian general who serves Tyr'ahnee and X-2, secretly plotting to take over both Earth and Mars as their new ruler. Z-9 then staged a military coup on Mars by taking Tyr'ahnee as prisoner and sending X-2 on the run as a wanted criminal, declaring himself the new Martian King and Commander. Z-9 then plans to get hold of the shut-down codes of Earth's shield system by staging up a false peace treaty between Mars and Earth to finalize his invasion on Earth. Fortunately, Duck Dodgers manages to rescue Cadet, X-2, and Captain Johnson and they collaborated to keep the codes away to safety and save Tyr'ahnee from Z-9's grasp during a battle between Z-9's forces and Earth. Following the aftermath of the battle between Earth and Mars which ended in ceasefire, Z-9 is arrested, then sentenced to be imprisoned alongside the Andromeda Annihilator, who subjects him to painful torture.

=== Dish ===
Dish (voiced by Tara Strong) is a cyborg who is Z-9's loyal second-in-command and counselor. She aids him into overthrowing Tyr'ahnee and sending X-2 on the run to finalize his takeover of Mars. In a battle between Earth's forces and Z-9's forces, Dish attempts to fire at the Protectorate HQ under Z-9's orders, but Tyr'ahnee stops her by cutting her head off.

=== Martian Centurion Robots ===
The Martian Centurion Robots (voiced by Michael Dorn) are robotic servants of the Mars Empire. They appear to be sentient, and make up a large portion of the Imperial Army, while the organic Martians act as officers.

=== Instant Martians ===
Instant Martians are bird-like Martian creatures who Commander X-2 uses in an escape ploy. They emerge from minuscule seeds that are activated when they come in contact with water.

== Other villains ==
=== Catapoids ===
Catapoids (voiced by Grey DeLisle) are caterpillar-like aliens who take the form of girls when Duck Dodgers first encounters them. One of them appears in the Legion of Duck Doom in girl form, but has no dialogue.

=== Count Muerte ===
Count Muerte (voiced by Jeff Bennett) is a fat-sucking vampire who hypnotizes Duck Dodgers to help him in a plot to suck the fat out of the Eager Young Space Cadet. Cadet destroys Count Muerte by using a fat-free cheese duplicate of himself. Muerte later returns as a member of the Legion of Duck Doom.

=== Drake Darkstar ===
Drake Darkstar (voiced by Joe Alaskey) is a conniving maniac who resembles Duck Dodgers, but has the feathers on the top of his head facing backwards. During a prison visit, Darkstar escapes and the guards take Dodgers into custody, mistaking him for Drake.

=== Martian Gophers ===
The Martian Gophers (voiced by Rob Paulsen and Jess Harnell) are six-limbed, green gopher-like creatures from Mars. Their king (voiced by Stan Freberg) intends to blow up Mars, but is repeatedly thwarted by K-9.

=== K'Chutha Sa'am ===
K'Chutha Sa'am (voiced by Maurice LaMarche) is the leader of the Klunkins. He first appears plotting to take over Earth, but is thwarted by Cadet. Sa'am is later seen as a member of the Legion of Duck Doom. The character is based on Yosemite Sam.

=== Long John Silver the 23rd ===
Long John Silver the 23rd (voiced by John DiMaggio) is a descendant of the original Long John Silver. He leads a band of space pirates and wields Disappearo, a device that allows his ship to disappear without detection.

=== Nasty Canasta ===
Nasty Canasta (voiced by Kevin Michael Richardson) is an intergalactic bounty hunter. He is hired by X-2 to take down Duck Dodgers, who is vacationing on Roboworld. Disguised as a cowboy, Canasta takes on Dodgers before being defeated by the robot version of Cadet. He is later recruited into the Legion of Duck Doom.

=== Sinestro ===
Sinestro (voiced by John de Lancie) is a longtime enemy of the Green Lantern Corps. He appears in the episode "The Green Loontern", a crossover with the DC Comics universe.

=== Dr. Woe ===
Dr. Woe (voiced by Joe Alaskey) is a mad scientist who is the archenemy of X-2.

=== Archduke Zag ===
Archduke Zag (voiced by Clancy Brown) is Cadet's evil cousin who took over Swinus 9. When Cadet returns to Swinus 9 and defeats Zag in single combat, Zag summons a lava monster to attack him. Dodgers and Princess Incense disable the lava monster's energy source, resulting in Zag's defeat.

=== Maninsuit ===
Maninsuit (voiced by Frank Welker) is a giant docile monster from the planet Niponno who was controlled by the Martians before being freed by Duck Dodgers, Cadet, and Rickki Roundhouse. The character is a parody of Godzilla.

=== Alien Hunter ===
The Alien Hunter (voiced by Dee Bradley Baker) is a hunter who targets X-2 and K-9 during their hunting trip. The hunter is later revealed to be Wile E. Coyote, who has survived to the 24th century and still cannot catch the Road Runner. Wile E. Coyote later appears as a member of the Legion of Duck Doom.

=== Baby-Faced Moonbeam ===
Baby-Faced Moonbeam (voiced by Dick Beals) is an evil little boy with electromagnetic powers. He was sentenced to life imprisonment and frozen in ice 300 years ago, but was freed by Dodgers, who took him in as a son. Moonbeam goes on to join the Legion of Duck Doom.

=== New Cadet ===
An unidentified female cadet (voiced initially by Kelly Ripa; later by Vanessa Marshall) infiltrates Duck Dodgers' ship posing as Cadet's replacement so she could start a relationship with him. The Cadet goes on to join the Legion of Duck Doom, having developed an attraction to X-2.

=== Mother Fudd ===
Mother Fudd (voiced by Billy West) is the leader of the Fudd, a parasitic mind-altering alien disease that makes anyone exposed to it take on his personality. Duck Dodgers, Cadet, and X-2 were rendered immune to the Fudd's effects after being exposed to a magical rock, allowing them to thwart Fudd's attempt to take over the solar system. He goes on to join the Legion of Duck Doom. Mother Fudd is based on Elmer Fudd.

=== Commandante Hilgalgo ===
Commandante Hilgalgo (voiced by Carlos Alazraqui) is the ruler of a California-esque planet with less-advanced technology. Duck Dodgers, disguised as Xero, takes on Hilgalgo and defeats him in a sword fight which Dodgers won. He is last seen in the Legion of Duck Doom. Hilgalgo goes on to join the Legion of Duck Doom.

=== Tasmanian Warrior ===
The Tasmanian Warrior (voiced by Jim Cummings) is a tasmanian devil-like creature from the planet `Masatevo. He goes on to join the Legion of Duck Doom. The Tasmanian Warrior is based on the Tasmanian Devil.

=== Crusher ===
Crusher (voiced by John DiMaggio) is a tough surfer who is said to be the best in the universe. He challenges Duck Dodgers to a surfing contest, which Dodgers ends up winning. Crusher goes on to join the Legion of Duck Doom.

=== Phantom Shadow ===
The Phantom Shadow (voiced by Dee Bradley Baker) is a character originating from the Scooby-Doo franchise. It makes a minor appearance in the Duck Dodgers episode "Surf the Stars" as one of several monsters chasing Dodgers and Crusher.

=== Andromeda Annihilator ===
The Andromeda Annihilator (voiced by Joe Alaskey) is a convict who shared a prison cell with the Cadet. After the Cadet is freed, Z-9 is sentenced to be imprisoned with the Annihilator, who subjects him to painful torture.

=== Black Eel ===
The Black Eel (voiced by Jim Cummings) is a villain in an atmospheric diving suit and a parody of Black Manta, who first appears as a member of the Legion of Duck Doom. He later attends Tyr'ahnee's wedding with his enemy Seaman (a parody of Aquaman).

=== Magnificent Rogue ===
The Magnificent Rogue (voiced by Tim Curry) is a handsome, rich, long-haired, muscular and suave villain who is a celebrity. He plotted to flood the Earth by moving the Moon close to Earth, but was thwarted and escaped.

=== Victor Von Boogieman ===
Victor Von Boogieman (voiced by Jeff Bennett) is a villain from the disco planet Groovica. He teamed with X-2 and Tyr'ahnee to steal the galaxy's supply of diamonds, but was thwarted by Duck Dodgers, Cadet, and Paprika Solo.

=== Dr. Maniac ===
Dr. Maniac (voiced by Henry Winkler) is a mad scientist who was hired by the Martians to help them with a cybernetic project. However, he is unqualified to work on the project, allowing Dodgers to thwart the Martians. It is later revealed that Dr. Maniac is a former circus clown and a friend of X-2's uncle, who pressured his nephew to give Dr. Maniac a job on Mars.

=== Hubie and Bertie ===
Hubie and Bertie (voiced by Joe Alaskey) are two mice hired by Tyr'ahnee and X-2 to turn Duck Dodgers against Cadet with various pranks that the other one is blamed for. When Dodgers and Cadet discover this, they use them against Tyr'ahnee and X-2.

=== Skunderbelly ===
Skunderbelly (voiced by Bob Joles) is a gambling kingpin who hired bounty hunters to capture Duck Dodgers.

=== Manobrain ===
Manobrain (voiced by Lewis Black) is a tentacled alien with a large brain and psychic abilities who used to be friends with I.Q. Hi. Their friendship ended in college when they blamed each other for the loss of a prototype weight-loss pill they invented. Monobrain became a criminal mastermind and resurfaced to steal secret codes that were to be used in the event that the President of Outer Space accidentally locked himself in his walk-in closet.

=== Whoosh ===
Whoosh (voiced by Brian Tochi) is an orangutan-like alien and master of Gibbon Fist Kung Fu.

=== Serpenti Crime Family ===
The Serpenti crime family are snake-like aliens who make up a crime family. It is led by twin brothers Royal and Roy Serpenti (respectively voiced by Burt Reynolds and Dom DeLuise).

=== Camoman ===
Camoman (voiced by Jeff Garlin) is a supervillain who can blend into his surroundings unless they are plaid. He infiltrated Dodgers' ship when the "Bonefide Heroes" show was filming Duck Dodgers so that Camoman could be on TV.

== Other characters ==
=== Happy Cat ===
Happy Cat (voiced by Mako) is a corporate mascot for a large line of products. Happy Cat makes numerous appearances throughout the series, often in a background role, though he takes on the role of a villain in one episode as "Achu the Wizard." Dodgers has a Happy Cat alarm clock by his bed, given to him by the Cadet for Christmas, which often taunts him into getting up. Dodgers frequently tries to destroy the clock in comedic fashion (smashing it with a hammer or golf club, or kicking it and stomping on it) but it continues to operate. He speaks with a raspy Japanese accent.

=== Agent Yoshimi ===
Agent Nikki Yoshimi is a Japanese special agent assigned by the President of Outer Space to organize freedom fighters to liberate the planet Andromeda 6 from Martian Centurion Robots. Dodgers and the Cadet are tasked with transporting Yoshimi to Andromeda 6, during which Dodgers develops unrequited feelings for her.

=== The President of Space ===
The titular ruler of the Galactic Protectorate, the President of Space (voiced by Tom Kane) is shown to be more of a figurehead ruler than a capable one; most business is taken care of by I.Q. Hi.

=== Agent Roboto ===
Agent Roboto (voiced by Kevin Michael Richardson) is a robot created by Dr. I.Q. Hi to assist Duck Dodgers and Cadet when the Martians' Space Station was firing a laser. Roboto proves to be very good at saving lives, which leads to Dodgers planning to get rid of him. Roboto ends up being destroyed, but returns with a vengeance against Dodgers and forms the Legion of Duck Doom, an alliance of Dodgers' past enemies, to attack him. When Roboto realizes that he had been blinded by rage, he warns Dodgers about the Legion's plan and ultimately sacrifices himself to save Dodgers from a meteor.

=== Lezah the Wicked ===
Lezah the Wicked (voiced by June Foray) is a character in a virtual MMORPG. In the game, she sends Dodgers' character on a quest to save a princess, who turns out to be Lezah herself.

=== Dr. Psy Q. Hi ===
Dr. Psy Q. Hi (voiced by John Billingsley) is the brother of Dr. I.Q. Hi and a therapist.

=== Steve Boston ===
Steve Boston (voiced by Chris Edgerly), also known as "The Six Wazillion Dollar Man", trained Duck Dodgers to master his cybernetic parts and assisted him in thwarting the Martian's plot that involved people with cybernetic parts. He is parody of Steve Austin, the titular character in The Six Million Dollar Man.

=== Chancellor Flippauralius ===
Chancellor Flippauralius (voiced by James Patrick Stuart) is the ruler of the Dophinites on the planet Aquarium and is a fan of classical music. When Dodgers and Cadet visit Aquarium on a diplomatic mission, they side with opposing rulers on their musical opinions. This almost breaks out into a civil war until both races agree to share to prevent Aquarium from being destroyed.

=== King Great White ===
King Great White (voiced by John DiMaggio) is the ruler of the Sharkarians on the planet Aquarium and is a fan of rock music. When Dodgers and Cadet visit Aquarium on a diplomatic mission, they side with opposing rulers on their musical opinions. This almost breaks out into a civil war until both races agree to share to prevent Aquarium from being destroyed.

=== Rona Vipra ===
Rona Vipra (voiced by Paget Brewster) is an ex-bounty hunter turned interior designer. She was originally hired by Skunderbelly, but allied with Duck Dodgers.

=== Hungortus ===
Hungortus (voiced by Daran Norris) is an alien entity with seemingly limitless cosmic powers, forced to consume planets—via a mouth on his stomach—to sustain himself. He is a parody of the Marvel Comics character Galactus.

=== Flame Valet ===
Flame Valet (voiced by Tom Kenny) is a fiery lawyer who serves as the Herald of Hungortus. Earth used him to convince Hungortus to eat Mars, even though Flame Valet has never won a case.

=== Counselor Combustion ===
Counselor Combustion (voiced by Jennifer Hale) is a lawyer and the sister of Flame Valet. Mars uses her to convince Hungortus to devour Earth.

=== Master Moloch ===
Master Moloch (voiced by Quentin Tarantino) is a gibbon-like alien who trains Protectorate Agents. He is a master of the Gibbon Fist Kung Fu move.

=== Princess Incense ===
Princess Incense is seen in the episode "Pig Planet". She was played by the fictional character Petunia Pig, and voiced by Jodi Benson. Physically, she seemed to be based on Princess Jasmine from Disney's Aladdin.

=== Rocky and Mugsy ===
Duck Dodgers and Cadet hired Rocky and Mugsy (respectively voiced by Jim Cummings and Kevin Michael Richardson) to get close to the Serpenti crime family. It is mentioned that the Serpenti family ruined Rocky's first bank robbery job.

=== Dave Mustaine ===
Dave Mustaine is the vocalist and guitarist of the heavy metal band Megadeth. Mustaine voices himself in the episode "In Space, No One Can Hear You Rock", where he defeats Tyr'Ahnee by destroying the Martian ships with the sound of his music.

=== Porko, Puerco and Sow ===
Porko, Puerco, and Sow (respectively voiced by Rob Paulsen, Jess Harnell, and Tress MacNeille) are the Cadet's niece and nephews. They are inspired by the Animaniacs characters Yakko, Wakko, and Dot, with whom they share their voice actors.

=== Cassiopeia ===
Cassiopeia (voiced by Jane Wiedlin) is a pop star who Dodgers lusts after. Her only appearance was in the episode "They Stole Dodgers' Brain". He tries to impress her but fails miserably, ultimately setting her hair on fire and throwing space leeches on her to put out the fire, and she kicks him out of her room.

=== Hal Jordan ===
Hal Jordan (voiced by Kevin Smith) is a member of the Green Lantern Corps and Green Lantern of Sector 2814. In the episode "The Green Loontern" his Green Lantern uniform and ring were swapped at the dry cleaners with Duck Dodgers' space uniform. After Sinestro's defeat, he returns Dodgers' suit back and takes back his own.
