= Drip-Along Daffy =

1951 film by Chuck Jones

- Title card
- Directed by: Charles M. Jones
- Story by: Michael Maltese
- Starring: Mel Blanc
- Music by: Carl Stalling
- Animation by: Phil Monroe; Lloyd Vaughan; Ben Washam; Ken Harris
- Layouts by: Philip DeGuard
- Backgrounds by: Robert Gribbroek
- Color process: Color by: Technicolor
- Production company: Warner Bros. Cartoons
- Distributed by: Warner Bros. Pictures; The Vitaphone Corporation
- Release date: November 17, 1951
- Running time: 7:20
- Language: English

Drip-Along Daffy is a 1951 Warner Bros. Merrie Melodies theatrical cartoon short, directed by Chuck Jones and written by Michael Maltese. The cartoon was released on November 17, 1951, and stars Daffy Duck and Porky Pig.

This cartoon was produced as a parody of Westerns which were popular at the time of its release, and features Daffy Duck as a "Western-Type Hero", who, with his trusty "Comedy Relief" (Porky Pig) hopes to clean up a violence-filled "one-horse town". In a tongue-in-cheek nod to The Lone Ranger, Daffy's horse is named "Tinfoil". The cartoon includes an original song (sung by Porky) called "The Flower of Gower Gulch", a parody of sentimental cowboy-style love songs, Gower Gulch being an intersection in Hollywood known as a gathering spot for would-be actors in early Westerns.

Drip-Along Daffy featured the first appearance of the villain character Nasty Canasta, a Mexican rogue who would resurface in several later Jones cartoons, as well as an episode of The Sylvester and Tweety Mysteries, the movie Looney Tunes: Back in Action in 2003, and occasionally on the Duck Dodgers TV series.

== Plot ==
The film depicts Daffy as a "Western-Type Hero" and Porky as the "Comedy Relief". In a recorded commentary on the Looney Tunes Golden Collection, the commentator warns the viewer that "this film is literally stuffed with every western cliché ever done." This is illustrated in such spoof scenes as follows: a man is firing guns while chasing another man; both stop at a traffic light so a second pair can cross, then their chase resumes. Two riders on horseback casually approach one another; when they are in close proximity, the horses recoil and whinny in anger, then begin shooting at each other. Other scenes include: a holdup at "Custard's Last Stand"; a masked horse stealing horseshoes from a smithy at gunpoint; a gunman shot off someone's balcony is caught by waiting stretcher-bearers, who trot him off to "Rigor O'Mortis / The Smiling Undertaker"...whose funeral parlor towers several stories above the neighboring buildings.

== Reception ==
Andrew Farago writes, "The prevailing theory about acting has always been that an absolutely great actor will lose himself in any role he plays... Daffy Duck, on the other hand, didn't get where he is today by playing by the rules. Whether he's a bellhop, a talent scout, a beloved pet, a space-faring adventurer, a scarlet-clad swashbuckler, or a cowboy, Daffy Duck is Daffy Duck." Commenting on Daffy and Porky's roles, he says, "Drip-Along Daffy marks an important turning point in their careers, as the Warner Bros. animation stable realized that the eternally optimistic, steadfast, and — dare we say it, competent — sidekick role made Porky the perfect foil for a certain irrepressible duck."

== Home media ==
This cartoon is included with the original ending restored on Disc Two of Looney Tunes Golden Collection: Volume 1 and Disc Two of Looney Tunes Platinum Collection: Volume 2.

== See also ==
- List of cartoons featuring Daffy Duck
- Porky Pig filmography
