= List of Duck Dodgers episodes =

This is a list of episodes from the Duck Dodgers animated science fiction and fantasy series, which originally aired on the Cartoon Network. The series features space captain Duck Dodgers, the alter ego of Daffy Duck. A total of 39 episodes were produced spanning three seasons.

== Series overview ==
Season	Episodes		Originally released		
Season	Episodes		First released	Last released	Network
1	13		August 23, 2003	November 15, 2003	Cartoon Network
2	13		August 14, 2004	February 25, 2005	Cartoon Network
3	13	5	March 11, 2005	April 22, 2005	Cartoon Network
3	13	8	September 16, 2005	November 11, 2005	Boomerang

== Episodes ==
=== Season 1 (2003) ===
No. overall	No. in season	Title	Written by	Original release date
1	1	"Duck Deception"	Spike Brandt, Tony Cervone, and Paul Dini	August 23, 2003
1	1	"The Spy Who Didn't Love Me"	Spike Brandt, Tony Cervone, Paul Dini, and Tom Minton	August 23, 2003
Dodgers and Cadet have to sneak on a Martian ship to restore power to their own ship, and try to avoid being caught by its occupants, but in order to do this, Dodgers disguises Cadet into a beautiful Vixen Princess. Dodgers has to escort a spy he's infatuated with to a planet invaded by the Martians.
2	2	"The Fowl Friend"	Spike Brandt, Tony Cervone, Paul Dini, and Tom Minton	August 30, 2003
2	2	"The Fast & the Feathery"	Spike Brandt, Tony Cervone, Paul Dini, and Tom Minton	August 30, 2003
Dodgers gets a robot assistant (a parody of The Iron Giant). Dodgers is pressured to enter a race against X-2.
3	3	"The Trial of Duck Dodgers"	Spike Brandt, Tony Cervone, Paul Dini, and Tom Minton	September 6, 2003
3	3	"Big Bug Mamas"	Spike Brandt, Tony Cervone, Paul Dini, and Tom Minton	September 6, 2003
Duck Dodgers is put on trial for misconduct. Dodgers gets kidnapped by a group of alien girls who are really planning to eat him.
4	4	"Duck Codgers"	Spike Brandt, Tony Cervone, Paul Dini, and Tom Minton	September 13, 2003
4	4	"Where's Baby Smartypants?"	Spike Brandt, Tony Cervone, Paul Dini, and Tom Minton	September 13, 2003
When Dodgers and Cadet are affected by a plant gas that causes rapid aging, they must bathe in a Martian spring guarded by X-2 to be turned back into their normal ages. Cadet must escort a baby to a peace treaty meeting while Dodgers distracts the treaty signers.
5	5	"I'm Going to Get You Fat Sucka"	Spike Brandt, Tony Cervone, Paul Dini, and Tom Minton	September 20, 2003
5	5	"Detained Duck"	Spike Brandt, Tony Cervone, Paul Dini, and Tom Minton	September 20, 2003
A fat sucking vampire has his eye on the chubby Cadet, and hypnotizes Dodgers into an Igor like slave to help capture the portly pig. Criminal Drake Darkstar switches places with Dodgers, with whom he bears an uncanny resemblance.
6	6	"K-9 Kaddy"	Spike Brandt, Tony Cervone, Paul Dini, and Tom Minton	September 27, 2003
6	6	"Pig of Action"	Spike Brandt, Tony Cervone, Paul Dini, and Tom Minton	September 27, 2003
K-9 gets involved in a series of trouble with a pair of four-armed gophers while X-2 plays golf. Cadet finds a piece of glowing ore, which turns him into a hulking juggernaut during a stakeout on the Klunkins.
7	7	"Shiver Me Dodgers"	Spike Brandt, Tony Cervone, Paul Dini, and Tom Minton	October 4, 2003
On behalf of the Galactic Protectorate, Dodgers and Cadet must venture on a pirate spaceship as lazy sailors to retrieve an invisibility device from the leader of the pirates, Long John Silver the 23rd, who is using it for his purposes. However, things become complicated when X-2 arrives in disguise as well, intending to retrieve the device on behalf of Mars, which then forces all three to work together to avoid being caught by Silver.
8	8	"They Stole Dodgers' Brain"	Spike Brandt, Tony Cervone, Paul Dini, and Tom Minton	October 11, 2003
8	8	"The Wrath of Canasta"	Spike Brandt, Tony Cervone, Paul Dini, and Tom Minton	October 11, 2003
The Martians steal Dodgers' brain and replace it in order to learn his secrets, but the replacement accidentally makes Dodgers smarter than he used to be. A bounty hunter tries to turn Dodgers in to the martians while disguising himself to fit in with the Vacationworld androids.
9	9	"The Green Loontern"	Spike Brandt, Tony Cervone, Paul Dini, and Tom Minton	October 18, 2003
Duck Dodgers accidentally gets his hands on a Green Lantern ring and suit (belonging to Hal Jordan). He is transported to Oa, and helps the remaining members of the Green Lantern Corps (including Kilowog, Katma Tui, Ch'p, and Ganthet) defeat Sinestro.
10	10	"Quarterback Quack"	Spike Brandt, Tony Cervone, Paul Dini, and Tom Minton	October 25, 2003
10	10	"To Love a Duck"	Spike Brandt, Tony Cervone, Paul Dini, and Tom Minton	October 25, 2003
X-2 tries to make Duck Dodgers a successful quarterback to prove to Tyr'ahnee that he was right about something. Tyr'ahnee tries to marry Dodgers, but he doesn't like the attention or the idea.
11	11	"Hooray for Hollywood Planet"	Spike Brandt, Tony Cervone, Paul Dini, and Tom Minton	November 1, 2003
Duck Dodgers goes to Hollywood planet so a film about him could be made, but doesn't realize what's really going on.
12	12	"The Queen Is Wild"	Spike Brandt, Tony Cervone, Paul Dini, and Tom Minton	November 8, 2003
12	12	"Back to the Academy"	Spike Brandt, Tony Cervone, Paul Dini, and Tom Minton	November 8, 2003
Tyr'ahnee tries to cast revenge to Dodgers by kidnapping Cadet. Dodgers has to go back to Galactic Training Academy, and to make things worse, a drill sergeant is always watching him.
13	13	"Enemy Yours"	Spike Brandt, Tony Cervone, Paul Dini, and Tom Minton	November 15, 2003
13	13	"Duck Departure"	Spike Brandt, Tony Cervone, Paul Dini, and Tom Minton	November 15, 2003
Dodgers must prove to X-2 that he's a worthwhile enemy. Dodgers quits his job at the Protectorate following a four-way battle to work in a restaurant, but no matter how hard he tries, he keeps being reminded of his former occupation.

=== Season 2 (2004–05) ===
No. overall	No. in season	Title	Written by	Original release date
14	1	"Pig Planet"	Spike Brandt, Tony Cervone, Paul Dini, and Tom Minton	August 14, 2004
Cadet tells his niece and nephews a story about his past.
15	2	"Invictus Interruptus"	Spike Brandt, Tony Cervone, Paul Dini, and Tom Minton	August 14, 2004
15	2	"Pet Peeved"	Spike Brandt, Tony Cervone, Paul Dini, and Tom Minton	August 14, 2004
Duck Dodgers and the Cadet take down a Martian super weapon. Dodgers adopts a pet that may be more than it seems.
16	3	"The Menace of Maninsuit"	Spike Brandt, Tony Cervone, Paul Dini, and Tom Minton	August 14, 2004
16	3	"K9 Quarry"	Spike Brandt, Tony Cervone, Paul Dini, and Tom Minton	August 14, 2004
Dodgers, Cadet, and Rikki Roundhouse must free a planet from a rogue Maninsuit. The Martian Commander channels Elmer Fudd and goes hunting on Mars, but doesn't know who's hunting who.
17	4	"Talent Show a Go-Go"	Spike Brandt, Tony Cervone, Paul Dini, and Tom Minton	August 14, 2004
17	4	"The Love of a Father"	Spike Brandt, Tony Cervone, Paul Dini, and Tom Minton	August 14, 2004
Dodgers steals Tom Jones' voice in order to win a talent show. Dodgers accidentally frees a criminal that looks like a little boy.
18	5	"The New Cadet"	Spike Brandt, Tony Cervone, Paul Dini, and Tom Minton	August 14, 2004
18	5	"The Love Duck"	Spike Brandt, Tony Cervone, Paul Dini, and Tom Minton	August 14, 2004
A woman tries to seduce Dodgers, but he doesn't want her affection. Dodgers and Cadet try to earn money by setting up a loveboat, but things soon go awry.
19	6	"The Fudd"	Spike Brandt, Tony Cervone, Paul Dini, and Tom Minton	August 14, 2004
A hive-mind alien race known as the Fudd (a parody of both The Flood from the Halo series and The Borg of Star Trek) transforms nearly every human and Martian on their respective planets--and even space--in a plot to destroy the Sun. When Dodgers, Cadet, and X-2 are the only sentient beings left unchanged, they must work together to save the Solar System from annihilation.
20	7	"The Mark of Xero"	Spike Brandt, Tony Cervone, Paul Dini, and Tom Minton	January 7, 2005
20	7	"I See Duck People"	Spike Brandt, Tony Cervone, Paul Dini, and Tom Minton	January 7, 2005
Dodgers invades a Spain-like planet to free innocent people who have been captured on it. Duck Dodgers' ship is haunted by a ghost, but no one will believe Dodgers.
21	8	"Deathmatch Duck"	Spike Brandt, Tony Cervone, Paul Dini, and Tom Minton	January 14, 2005
21	8	"Deconstructing Dodgers"	Spike Brandt, Tony Cervone, Paul Dini, and Tom Minton	January 14, 2005
While on a living planet called Masativo, Dodgers tries to defeat Taz, who has set foot on the planet and is being a terrifying threat to its inhabitants. While stranded at an Intergalactic Space Airport, I.Q. Hi and the Queen of Mars reminisce about whether Dodgers isn't as dumb as he seems.
22	9	"M.M.O.R.P.D."	Spike Brandt, Tony Cervone, Paul Dini, and Tom Minton	January 21, 2005
22	9	"Old McDodgers"	Spike Brandt, Tony Cervone, Paul Dini, and Tom Minton	January 21, 2005
Cadet shows Dodgers a digital role-playing game he plays often. Dodgers shows Cadet some farming so that they can grow food.
23	10	"Diva Delivery"	Spike Brandt, Tony Cervone, Paul Dini, and Tom Minton	January 28, 2005
23	10	"Castle High"	Spike Brandt, Tony Cervone, Paul Dini, and Tom Minton	January 28, 2005
Dodgers and Cadet must deliver a Diva to a festival, but run into problems while doing so. Dodgers tries to explain to I.Q what happened to his castle (a parody of Frankenstein).
24	11	"Surf the Stars"	Spike Brandt, Tony Cervone, Paul Dini, and Tom Minton	February 4, 2005
24	11	"Samurai Quack"	Spike Brandt, Tony Cervone, Paul Dini, and Tom Minton	February 4, 2005
Dodgers is confronted by a large bully named Crusher who challenges him to a surfing contest. Dodgers eats a poison blowfish and is sucked into a Samurai Jack-inspired dream world.
25	12	"Of Course You Know This Means War and Peace"	Story & Teleplay by : Paul Dini and Tom Ruegger	February 25, 2005
26	13	"Of Course You Know This Means War and Peace"	Story & Teleplay by : Paul Dini and Tom Ruegger	February 25, 2005
Dodgers accidentally causes an incident during a peace treaty between Earth and Mars and gets Cadet to take the fall. While in prison, the Cadet is angry at Dodgers and terminates their friendship. Meanwhile, one of the Martian Generals, Z-9, takes the opportunity to plot a military coup on Mars by betraying Queen Tyran'hee and holding her hostage, sending Star Johnson to prison after the latter learns about the plot, and forcing Commander X-2 on the run as a wanted criminal. Z-9 also plans to use Dodgers in order to get the shutdown codes of Earth's defense system to finalize his takeover of not only Earth, but also the rest of the Galactic Protectorate. Determining to set things right, Dodgers rescues X-2 from Z-9's forces and breaks Star Johnson and Cadet out of prison to help them rescue the Queen and stop Z-9 in his tracks, despite Cadet's cold attitude toward Dodgers after what he did to him. They manage to deliver the shutdown codes away from Z-9 and rescue the Queen during a battle between Z-9's forces and Earth's forces. After his defeat, Z-9 is then arrested, sacked of his ranks, and put to jail for his war crimes while Dodgers manages to have all charges against Cadet to be dropped by selflessly confessing his responsibility of the peace treaty incident. Touched, Cadet reconciles with Dodgers, who is later subjected to 500 hours of community service as punishment for his actions.

=== Season 3 (2005) ===
No. overall	No. in season	Title	Written by	Original release date
Cartoon Network
27	1	"Till Doom Do Us Part"	Mark Banker, Spike Brandt, and Tony Cervone	March 11, 2005
Roboto returns for revenge as he assembles all of Dodgers' enemies together. Meanwhile, X-2 and the Queen prepare for a wedding.
28	2	"Villainstruck"	Story by : Mark Banker; Teleplay by : Kevin Seccia	March 18, 2005
28	2	"Just the Two of Us"	Story by : Mark Banker; Teleplay by : Ken Daly and John Matta	March 18, 2005
Dodgers must stop the Magnificent Rogue from turning the Earth into a water planet. The Cadet and Martian centurions take a vacation, while Dodgers and X-2 are stranded on a deserted island.
29	3	"The Kids Are All Wrong"	Story by : Mark Banker; Teleplay by : Michael Grodner	April 8, 2005
29	3	"Win, Lose or Duck"	Story by : Mark Banker; Teleplay by : Jeff Goode	April 8, 2005
Dodgers and Cadet must go undercover at a high school to find a device that turns teenagers into "emotionally unstable lunatics." Teams from Earth and Mars are abducted to compete against each other on a dangerous game show.
30	4	"Boar to Be Riled"	Mark Banker	April 15, 2005
30	4	"Clean Bill of Health"	Story by : Mark Banker; Teleplay by : Kevin Seccia	April 15, 2005
Dodgers attempts to get a free rocketcycle by starting a biker gang. I.Q. Hi creates a device that detoxifies Dodgers a little too well.
31	5	"The Best of Captains, the Worst of Captains"	Michael Grodner	April 22, 2005
31	5	"That's Lifomatica"	Kevin Seccia	April 22, 2005
Competition is fierce for Dodgers and Star Johnson, who both want to win the Captain of the Year award as well as the heart of a female Lieutenant. Dodgers gets a robot to make life easier, but things go awry when it takes over the ship. Note: This is the last episode to air on Cartoon Network.
Boomerang
32	6	"Diamond Boogie"	Story by : Mark Banker; Teleplay by : Ken Daly and John Matta	September 16, 2005 (Boomerang)
32	6	"Corporate Pigfall"	Story by : Mark Banker; Teleplay by : Bradford Schultze	September 16, 2005 (Boomerang)
Dodgers and Cadet travel to the ABBA-BeeGee quadrant to recover diamonds from the Martians. Cadet leaves the Protectorate to head a successful corporation, which Dodgers tries to sabotage.
33	7	"The Six Wazillion Dollar Duck"	Mark Banker	September 23, 2005 (Boomerang)
Dodgers is turned into a cyborg and must stop the Martians from attaining cyborganic technology.
34	8	"Too Close for Combat"	Story by : Mark Banker; Teleplay by : Tom Minton	September 30, 2005 (Boomerang)
34	8	"The Fins of War"	Story by : Mark Banker; Teleplay by : Michael Banker	September 30, 2005 (Boomerang)
The Martians hire Hubie and Bert, who trick Dodgers and Cadet into thinking the other is out to kill them. Dodgers and Cadet are sent as ambassadors to the planet Aquarium.
35	9	"Good Duck Hunting"	Kevin Seccia	October 7, 2005 (Boomerang)
35	9	"Consumption Overruled"	Story by : Mark Banker; Teleplay by : Ken Daly and John Matta	October 7, 2005 (Boomerang)
A criminal gambling kingpin hires a gang of bounty hunters to kill Duck Dodgers, but his plan goes downhill when one of the bounty hunters quits and offers to help Dodgers. When Hungortus the Eater of Worlds heads toward the solar system for his next meal, Dodgers and the Martians hire lawyers to convince him of which planet to eat: Earth or Mars.
36	10	"A Lame Duck Mind"	Story by : Mark Banker and Tim McKeon; Teleplay by : Ken Daly and John Matta	October 14, 2005 (Boomerang)
The President of Space locks himself in his closet, and the codes to open it must be retrieved from deep inside Dodgers' brain.
37	11	"Master & Disaster"	Kevin Seccia	October 21, 2005 (Boomerang)
37	11	"All in the Crime Family"	Mark Banker	October 21, 2005 (Boomerang)
Dodgers and the Cadet learn kung-fu in order to stop a master thief. The Serpenti gang steals the greatest gum in the galaxy, and Dodgers must get it back.
38	12	"In Space, No One Can Hear You Rock"	Mark Banker	November 4, 2005 (Boomerang)
38	12	"Ridealong Calamity"	Story by : Mark Banker; Teleplay by : Kevin Seccia	November 4, 2005 (Boomerang)
Earth resurrects Dave Mustaine and his thrash metal band Megadeth to prevent a Martian superweapon from replacing the planet's music with easy-listening jazz. I.Q. Hi tags along on a mission and Dodgers plots with the Martians to make him return to Earth.
39	13	"Bonafide Heroes"	Mark Banker	November 11, 2005 (Boomerang)
Dodgers is the subject of a reality television show called "Bonafide Heroes," which is documenting his life as a captain, and Dodgers decides to fake the capture of the criminal Camoman for the cameras. Meanwhile, the camera crew interviews various enemies and friends about Dodgers in-between. This episode serves as the series finale.
