= Richard McGonagle =

American actor (born 1946)

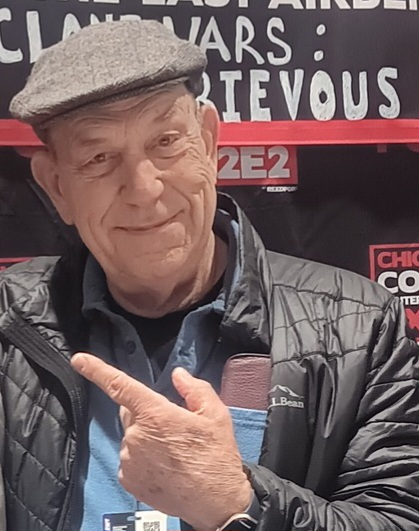
- McGonagle in 2026
- Born: Richard Francis McGonagle; October 22, 1946 (age 79); Boston, Massachusetts, U.S.
- Occupation: Actor
- Years active: 1969–2023
- Website: www.richardmcgonagle.com

Richard Francis McGonagle (born October 22, 1946) is an American actor. He is most known for his voice work in various video games, movies and television shows. He is also known for his work by voicing Colonel Taggart in Prototype, Orlovsky in World in Conflict: Soviet Assault, Mr. Incredible through various The Incredibles projects (in lieu of Craig T. Nelson), Victor Sullivan in the Uncharted franchise, Four Arms and Exo-Skull in the Ben 10 franchise, Bato in Avatar: The Last Airbender, Dr. Peace in No More Heroes, Eight-Armed Willy in The Marvelous Misadventures of Flapjack, Dr. I.Q. Hi in Duck Dodgers, Apocalypse in X-Men Legends II: Rise of Apocalypse, Ed Machine in Scooby-Doo! Mystery Incorporated, Tom Sheldon in Just Cause, Abin Sur in Green Lantern: First Flight, and Bill the Wrangler in Spirit: Stallion of the Cimarron, and provided additional voices for The Incredible Hulk: Ultimate Destruction, Pirates of the Caribbean: At World's End, World in Conflict, The Rise of the Argonauts, Dragon Age: Origins, Regular Show, OK K.O.! Let's Be Heroes and Samurai Jack.

== Early life ==
Richard Francis McGonagle was born in Boston, Massachusetts on October 22, 1946, the son of Hildagard Virginia (née Hiller) and William Francis McGonagle.

== Career ==
As a voice actor he has done many roles such as Four Arms and Exo-Skull on Ben 10, several voices on the show Samurai Jack, as Bato, a secondary character from Avatar: The Last Airbender, various people in Zatch Bell!, Bill the Wrangler in Spirit: Stallion of the Cimarron, Dr. I.Q. Hi in Duck Dodgers, Apocalypse in X-Men Legends II: Rise of Apocalypse, the second voice of General Grievous in Star Wars: Clone Wars, Ed Machine in Scooby-Doo! Mystery Incorporated, Abin Sur in Green Lantern: First Flight, and various teachers in Recess. He was one of the voice directors on Beyblade, and did various voices on Rugrats and All Grown Up! and adult voices on The Buzz on Maggie. He also provided the voice of the Oracle in Jak 3 and voiced Dr. Peace in No More Heroes, and Eight-Armed Willy in The Marvelous Misadventures of Flapjack, also voiced Herb (Starla's Father) in Regular Show.

He also voiced in video games such as Baten Kaitos Origins, Metal Gear Solid 3: Snake Eater, the Uncharted series (also motion capture), Just Cause, The Incredible Hulk: Ultimate Destruction, Dragon Age: Origins and Castle of Illusion Starring Mickey Mouse. In film, he appeared in The Bucket List for Warner Bros. Pictures. He narrated the acclaimed indie film (500) Days of Summer, starring Joseph Gordon-Levitt and Zooey Deschanel. He has also narrated a number of audiobooks, including the New York Times bestseller The Dark Side, by New Yorker journalist Jane Mayer.

In television, he has appeared in an episode of Star Trek: The Next Generation and two episodes of Star Trek: Voyager. He played the recurring character Judge Lathrop in the crime drama Close to Home and provided the voice of Sanders on the sitcom Community in the second-season episode "Basic Rocket Science". He appeared in the TV series Rules of Engagement as a doctor.

== Filmography ==
=== Live-action ===
==== Film ====
Year	Title	Role	Notes
1980	Union City	Man in Crowd	
1981	Tattoo	Texan's Friend	
1983	Man, Woman and Child	Faculty Member	
1985	The Man with One Red Shoe	CIA Agent	
1986	Howard the Duck	First Cop	
1987	Innerspace	Cop #2	
1988	14 Going on 30	Danny's Dad	Television film
1989	Dad	Victor Walton	
1994	Speechless	Dignitary	
1995	The American President	Rumson Staffer	
1997	Too Good to Be True	Spencer	
1998	Senseless	Robert Bellwether	
1998	Mighty Joe Young	Panda Owner	
2000	Rules of Engagement	Judge Col. E. Warner	
2001	Critical Mass	Adam Gould	
2007	The Bucket List	Board Chairman	
2009	500 Days of Summer	Narrator (voice)	
2009	The Consultants	Cutter	

==== Television ====
Year	Title	Role	Notes
1982	T. J. Hooker	Joe Doyle	Episode: "King of the Hill"
1982	Cheers	Customer	Episode: "The Tortelli Tort"
1982	Fame	Simon Marshall	Episode: "Beginnings"
1984	Hunter	Detective Levine	Episode: "Hunter"
1984	The New Mike Hammer	Joe Barry	Episode: "Warpath"
1985	Remington Steele	Colby, Clerk	2 episodes
1985	Moonlighting	Detective Barber	Episode: "Knowing Her"
1985	The A-Team	Pete Peterson	Episode: "There Goes the Neighborhood"
1985	Hill Street Blues	Dr. Sandler	Episode: "The Life and Time of Dominic Florio Jr."
1985	The Twilight Zone	Lester	Episode: :"Her Pilgrim Soul"
1986	Blacke's Magic	Leon	Episode: "Breathing Room"
1986	Highway to Heaven	Martin	Episode: "Keep Smiling"
1986	Simon & Simon	FBI Man	Episode: "Full Moon Blues"
1986	Falcon Crest	Auctioneer	Episode: "Flash Point"
1986	L.A. Law	Ackley Atwood-Wade	Episode: "Sidney, the Dead-Nosed Reindeer"
1987–1988	21 Jump Street	Bill Weckerle	2 episodes
1988	CBS Schoolbreak Special	Tom	Episode: "Gambler"
1989	Perfect Strangers	Zitell	Episode: "Crimebusters"
1989	Family Ties	Male Customer	Episode: "Simon Says"
1989	Mama's Family	Arthur Booth	Episode: "A Taxing Situation"
1989	Quantum Leap	Dad Wilson	Episode: "Camikazi Kid - June 6, 1961)
1989	Mr. Belvedere	Announcer	Episode: "The Field"
1989	Anything but Love	Priest	Episode: "Bang You're Dead"
1990	Over My Dead Body	Hargrove	Episode: "Pilot"
1991	Matlock	Eldon McNeeley	Episode: "The Accident"
1991	The Torkelsons	Howard Roberts	Episode: "Fence Neighbors"
1991	Night Court	Andrew	Episode: "Pop Goes the Question"
1992	Star Trek: The Next Generation	Dr. Ja'Dar	Episode: "New Ground"
1992	Sisters	Dr. Eastman	Episode: "Not in a Million Years"
1992–1993	Civil Wars	Judge Mandelberg	4 episodes
1994–2000	Days of Our Lives	Bishop Andrews, Friar Peter	8 episodes
1994	Picket Fences	FBI Agent	Episode: "Terms of Estrangement"
1994	The Adventures of Brisco County, Jr.	Ashenden	Episode: "Stagecoach"
1994	Melrose Place	Probation Officer	Episode: "The Cook, the Creep, His Lover, and Her Sister"
1994–1997	Party of Five	Emmett	4 episodes
1995	Me and the Boys	Tom	Episode: "The Kiss-Off"
1995	University Hospital	Dr. Ross	Episode: "Endings and Beginnings"
1995	Wings	Reverend Powell	Episode: "Ex, Lies, and Videotape"
1995	Seinfeld	Mr. Star	Episode: "The Maestro"
1995–1997	Murder One	Judge Owen Harris	3 episodes
1996–1997	3rd Rock from the Sun	Dr. Howard	5 episodes
1996	The Client	Minister Richards	Episode: "The Good Samaritan"
1996	The Secret World of Alex Mack	Judd DuBrow	Episode: "Local Hero'
1997	Life's Work	Carl Bieber	Episode: "Harassment"
1997	Brooklyn South	William "Woody" McKenzie	2 episodes
1997–1998	Veronica's Closet	Stanley	2 episodes
1997–2003	The Practice	Judge Patrick Wilcox	16 episodes
1998	Fantasy Island	Phillip Woodson	Episode: "Secret Self"
1998–1999	Pacific Blue	Police Chief Rod Sherman	2 episodes
1999	Clueless	Mr. Wilcox	Episode: "Mercy Date"
1999	Charmed	Woogy, Gasman	Episode: "Is There a Woogy in the House?"
1999	Snoops	William Keller	Episode: "True Believers"
1999–2000	Star Trek: Voyager	Commander Pete Harkins	2 episodes
2000	Titus	Dr. Phine	Episode: "Locking Up Mom"
2000	Zoe, Duncan, Jack and Jane	Art	Episode: "The Feud"
2001	Ally McBeal	District Attorney Moon	Episode: "Reasons to Believe"
2001	The X-Files	Francis Orovetz	Episode: "Deadalive"
2001	The West Wing	Senator Warren	Episode: "18th and Potomac"
2001	Roswell	General Edward Chambers	Episode: "Control"
2003–2004	JAG	Captain Richard Carey	6 episodes
2007	Close to Home	Judge Lathrop	3 episodes
2007–2013	Rules of Engagement	Dr. Sachs, Doctor	5 episodes
2008	Boston Legal	A.A.G. Norman Wood	Episode: "Patriot Acts"
2008	Dirty Sexy Money	Bishop Bascombe	2 episodes
2009	Better Off Ted	Manny	Episode: "Get Happy"
2010	Nip/Tuck	Roger McGuinness	Episode: "Dan Daly"
2010	Community	Sanders	Episode: "Basic Rocket Science"
2011	Harry's Law	Judge	Episode: "American Girl"
2012	The Middle	Doctor	Episode: "The Sit Down"

=== Voice roles ===
==== Film ====
List of voice performances in film
Year	Title	Role	Notes	Source
2000	Joseph: King of Dreams	Pharaoh	Direct-to-video	
2002	Spirit: Stallion of the Cimarron	Bill		
2008	Ben 10: Secret of the Omnitrix	Four Arms		
2009	Green Lantern: First Flight	Abin Sur	Direct-to-video	
2010	Tom and Jerry Meet Sherlock Holmes	Alley, First Policeman	Direct-to-video	
2012	Ben 10: Destroy All Aliens	Four Arms, Teacher	Television film	
2012	Tom and Jerry: Robin Hood and His Merry Mouse	Barney Bear, Alley	Direct-to-video	
2013	Tom and Jerry's Giant Adventure	Barney Bear	Direct-to-video	
2014	Justice League: War	President	Direct-to-video	
2014	Tom and Jerry: The Lost Dragon	Alley	Direct-to-video	
2015	Tom and Jerry: Spy Quest	Alley	Direct-to-video	
2016	Batman: Bad Blood	President	Direct-to-video	

==== Animation ====
List of voice performances in television
Year	Title	Role	Notes	Source
1987	Hello Kitty's Furry Tale Theater	Radio Announcer, Stagecoach Passenger	2 episodes	
1991	Tiny Toon Adventures	Narrator	Episode: "K-ACME TV"	
1996	Fantastic Four	Franklin Storm	Episode: "Behold, a Distant Star"	
2000–2001	As Told by Ginger	Officer Killgallen	2 episodes	
2001–2003	Samurai Jack	Odin, various voices	4 episodes	
2002	The Zeta Project	John, Agent	2 episodes	
2003–2005	Duck Dodgers	I.Q. Hi, additional voices	29 episodes	
2003	Justice League	Warden, Rick	Episode: "Only a Dream"	
2004	Megas XLR	Various voices	2 episodes	
2005	Star Wars: Clone Wars	General Grievous, Kit Fisto, additional voices	5 episodes	
2005–2007	Avatar: The Last Airbender	Bato	5 episodes	
2005	The Grim Adventures of Billy & Mandy	Father Time	Episode: "Billy and Mandy Save Christmas"	
2006–2007	Ben 10	Four Arms, Exo-Skull, additional voices	26 episodes	
2007–2008	Legion of Super Heroes	High Elder	2 episodes	
2008–2009	Ben 10: Alien Force	Reinrassig III, additional voices	10 episodes	
2008–2009	The Marvelous Misadventures of Flapjack	Eight-Armed Willy, additional voices	9 episodes	
2009–2011	Batman: The Brave and the Bold	Brainiac, Perry White, Sardath, Professor Carter Nichols, The Chief	4 episodes	
2010–2011	Scooby-Doo! Mystery Incorporated	Ed Machine, Announcer, Creepy Voice	5 episodes	
2010–2011	Sym-Bionic Titan	G3 Agent, Mysterious Figure, Titan, Lance's Father	3 episodes	
2011–2017	Regular Show	Various voices	8 episodes	
2017	OK K.O.! Let's Be Heroes	Chameleon Sr., Large Man	Episode: "My Dad Can Beat Up Your Dad"	

==== Video games ====
List of voice performances in video games
Year	Title	Role	Notes	Source
2001	Star Wars Rogue Squadron II: Rogue Leader	Rebel Soldier #1		
2003	Arc the Lad: Twilight of the Spirits	Lord of the Black Abyss		
2004	The Incredibles	Bob Parr / Mr. Incredible		
2004	The Incredibles: When Danger Calls	Bob Parr / Mr. Incredible		
2004	Jak 3	Oracle, Ottsel Leader, Precursor Spirit		
2004	Metal Gear Solid 3: Snake Eater	Lyndon B. Johnson	English dub	
2005	The Incredible Hulk: Ultimate Destruction	Abrams		
2005	X-Men Legends II: Rise of Apocalypse	Apocalypse		
2005	Chicken Little	Additional voices		
2005	The Incredibles: Rise of the Underminer	Bob Parr / Mr. Incredible		
2005	Metal Gear Solid 3: Subsistence	Lyndon B. Johnson	English dub	
2006	Baten Kaitos Origins	Rambari	English dub	
2006	Just Cause	Tom Sheldon		
2006	Pirates of the Caribbean: Dead Man's Chest	Captain Hector Barbossa		
2007	Meet the Robinsons	Mr. Willerstein		
2007	Disney Princess: Enchanted Journey	Doc		
2007	Ben 10: Protector of Earth	Four Arms		
2007	Uncharted: Drake's Fortune	Victor Sullivan	Also motion capture	
2007	No More Heroes	Dr. Peace	English dub	
2008	Too Human	ODIN, Valiant Leader		
2008	Rise of the Argonauts	Additional voices		
2009	Cartoon Network Universe: FusionFall	Four Arms		
2009	World in Conflict: Soviet Assault	Orlovsky		
2009	Prototype	Col. Taggart		
2009	Uncharted 2: Among Thieves	Victor Sullivan	Also motion capture	
2009	Jak and Daxter: The Lost Frontier	Dark Daxter		
2009	Dragon Age: Origins	Additional voices		
2011	Ben 10: Galactic Racing	Four Arms		
2011	Uncharted 3: Drake's Deception	Victor Sullivan	Also motion capture	
2012	Uncharted: Golden Abyss	Victor Sullivan	Also motion capture	
2012	PlayStation All-Stars Battle Royale	Victor Sullivan	Also motion capture	
2013	Disney Infinity	Bob Parr / Mr. Incredible		
2013	Castle of Illusion Starring Mickey Mouse	Narrator / Old Mouse		
2014	Disney Infinity: Marvel Super Heroes	Bob Parr / Mr. Incredible		
2015	Disney Infinity 3.0	Bob Parr / Mr. Incredible		
2016	Uncharted 4: A Thief's End	Victor Sullivan	Also motion capture	
2016	Batman: The Telltale Series	Carmine Falcone		
2020	Samurai Jack: Battle Through Time	Ancient King		
