= Nasty Canasta =

Warner Bros. theatrical cartoon character

- Looney Tunes/Merrie Melodies character
- First appearance: Drip-Along Daffy (1951)
- Created by: Chuck Jones
- Voiced by: Mel Blanc (1951–1954); Daws Butler (1956); Greg Burson (1994); Jim Cummings (1995); Kevin Michael Richardson (2003–present); Jeff Bennett (2003); Eric Bauza (2019)

In-universe information
- Species: Human

Nasty Canasta is a cartoon character and antagonist of the Merrie Melodies and Looney Tunes series who made appearances in three cartoons. Created by animator Chuck Jones, Canasta is depicted as a tough, hulking, and brutish-looking outlaw (normally with a cowboy theme). Like other similar antagonists in Looney Tunes, he is a typical 'dumb muscle' but is relatively more criminal in his personality and much more intimidating, especially in his nearly superhuman physique and threatening use of his revolver pistols. He was originally voiced by Mel Blanc, with Daws Butler voicing him in Barbary Coast Bunny.

== Drip-Along Daffy (1951) ==
In the 1951 film Drip-Along Daffy, Daffy Duck is about to take a drink at the bar when Nasty Canasta, playing on the flatness of two-dimensional animation, walks in past his 'Wanted' poster. Daffy tries to intimidate Canasta with his gun, but Canasta just bites off most of the gun and swallows it ("Probably didn't have his i-ron today!"). Canasta then intimidates Daffy with a drink made of various poisons and toxic materials (so 'hot', in fact, that when two ice cubes are put in, the ice cubes jump out, yelping, and leap into a bucket of water). Canasta downs the drink with no side effects (other than his hat flipping), and when Daffy gets Porky Pig to take the drink with seemingly no side effects, Daffy downs his as well. A few seconds later, Daffy and Porky exhibit wild side effects, turning green, reciting Mary Had a Little Lamb in childish voices and mannerisms, and briefly acting like they are both motorized. Eventually, Daffy challenges Canasta to a showdown in the street. Daffy and Canasta start walking towards each other, the street deserted, when Porky winds up a small British soldier doll and lets it go towards Canasta. Canasta picks up the doll, chuckling, until the doll points its gun at Canasta and fires, sending Canasta to the ground.

The townspeople come out cheering, and Daffy assumes that they are cheering for him, but Porky is the hero of the hour. The next day, Daffy is shown wearing a sanitation worker's uniform and pushing a dumpster, and comments about how he would clean up the 'one-horse town'. Porky, now the town sheriff, comments 'L-l-l-lucky for him it is a one horse town.'

== My Little Duckaroo (1954) ==
Canasta returns in My Little Duckaroo. When Nasty Canasta is first shown, he is sitting peacefully at a table playing cards. Upon proclaiming himself the Masked Avenger, Daffy fails to grab the attention of Canasta (stating "Didn't you hear me, I said I was the Masked Avenger. Look, see my mask? It's a very nice mask."), who still sits peacefully at his table dealing the cards. Daffy then vies for the attention of Canasta, leaving the scene and returning first as the whip-wielding (and stereotypically Mexican) "Frisco Kid", then in a suit reminiscent of Superman's as "Superguy". Again failing to grab his attention, Daffy suggests other identities that he could take, names parodying heroes of the time ("Captain Hideo? The Green Fathom? Mark of Zero? Trick or treat?"), but none interest Canasta. However, after Daffy offers a helpful suggestion to his card game ("Say, why don't you play your red jack on the black queen?"), Canasta asks him if he play cards. Daffy departs and returns in new cowboy garb (sans the mask), confident of victory. What follows is the humiliation of Daffy again and again through different gags and challenges. First Daffy tells Canasta to cut the cards, to which the game is ended abruptly when Canasta cuts the deck with a meat cleaver. Canasta then sends Daffy through the table in response to Daffy's challenge to an arm wrestling match, to which Daffy, dazed and staggering, responds, "I think you're pretty tough, don't I?". Porky then suggests to Daffy that he should just arrest him, to which Daffy agrees ("Well, you may have something there, Comedy Relief"). But when Daffy puts Canasta in irons and tries to take him away, he finds that he cannot move Canasta from the spot where he is standing. Daffy then gets annoyed and angry, to which he responds by telling Canasta that he is going to give him a fist beating. His challenge only ends badly for Daffy, as Canasta rips his shirt right off just by flexing his muscles before beating up Daffy off-screen, who staggers away broken and defeated, describing his earlier statement of his fixing Canasta's little red wagon in terms like it was literally a child's broken-down toy and announces that he is now going home to Mother, before collapsing.

== Barbary Coast Bunny (1956) ==
In Barbary Coast Bunny, a rather different version of Nasty Canasta appears—now with a dopier look, complete with pudgy lips and crooked teeth (and voiced not by Mel Blanc, but by Daws Butler). When Bugs Bunny finds a massive gold nugget, Canasta steals it from Bugs. That prompts Bugs to say, "You realize that this is not going to go unchallenged." Six months later, Nasty Canasta uses the ill-gotten gold to erect a rigged casino. Bugs is disguised as a rube and appears to believe that a slot machine is a "telly-o-phone." He asks his mom for more money. The machine rings up a jackpot and a barrel of money comes out, to Canasta's shock. Bugs says: "Gee, thanks, Mom!" and wheels away his winnings in his bag. Seeing this, Nasty challenges Bugs to a series of crooked card games such as blackjack in hopes of parting Bugs from his winnings. Bugs continuously (though seemingly naively) defeats him. Nasty Canasta also rigs a roulette wheel, but it somehow fails when Bugs decided to play number 23 and wins; in the last round, Nasty almost wins when the ball lands on a different number than 23 - which Nasty had blocked; however, Nasty thinks that he wins and hits the table so hard that the ball lands in 23. Bugs ultimately gets revenge by rendering Canasta flat broke. Nasty tries to rob Bugs - who spins the pistol cylinder, causing the gun to shoot coins. Nasty tries to spin coins from the gun as well - and gets blasted in the face. Just outside the swinging door exit, Bugs proclaims the moral of the episode to be, "Don't try to steal no 18 carrots [karats] from no rabbit."

== Other appearances ==
Nasty Canasta appeared in The Sylvester & Tweety Mysteries episode "B2 or Not B2", voiced by Jim Cummings. Unlike his other appearances, Nasty does not play a villainous role here. Instead, he is a champion bingo player, alongside his wife Inga. They are soon both put out of commission by the episode's antagonist. He resembles his look from Barbary Coast Bunny.

Nasty Canasta appears in the Duck Dodgers TV series episode "The Wrath of Canasta", voiced by Kevin Michael Richardson. At first, he appears as a typical science fiction bounty hunter, but after switching clothing to blend in at the resort he lands at, he resembles his look from Drip-Along Daffy.

Nasty Canasta appears in Looney Tunes: Back in Action in his look from Drip-Along Daffy, voiced by Jeff Bennett. He works alongside Yosemite Sam and Cottontail Smith to obtain the map to the Blue Monkey Diamond from DJ Drake.

Nasty Canasta appears as a boss character in Bugs Bunny Rabbit Rampage, voiced by Greg Burson, and an NPC in Looney Tunes: Acme Arsenal.
