= Barbary Coast Bunny =

Barbary-Coast Bunny
- Title card
- Directed by: Chuck Jones
- Story by: Tedd Pierce
- Starring: Mel Blanc; Daws Butler
- Edited by: Treg Brown
- Music by: Carl Stalling
- Animation by: Abe Levitow; Richard Thompson; Ken Harris
- Layouts by: Robert Gribbroek
- Backgrounds by: Philip DeGuard
- Color process: Technicolor
- Production company: Warner Bros. Cartoons
- Distributed by: Warner Bros. Pictures; The Vitaphone Corporation
- Release date: July 21, 1956 (U.S.)
- Running time: 6:49
- Language: English

Barbary-Coast Bunny is a 1956 Warner Bros. Looney Tunes cartoon short directed by Chuck Jones and written by Tedd Pierce. The short was released on July 21, 1956, and stars Bugs Bunny.

== Plot ==
Bugs is tunneling the cross country to meet his cousin Herman in San Francisco, only to run head first into a large nugget of gold. Nasty Canasta sets up a simple stand claiming to be a banker who can safely store Bugs' gold. When Bugs decides to ask for his gold back, Canasta claims that the bank is closing and traps Bugs in the folded-up stand while he rides away with the gold. Wrathfully, Bugs vows revenge on Nasty Canasta.

Six months later, Canasta has used his ill-gotten gains to start a casino in San Francisco. Bugs enters the casino and confuses a slot machine for a "telly-o-phone". When Bugs uses it to phone his mother for some money, he hits the jackpot, much to Canasta's shock. Trying to recoup this loss, Canasta convinces Bugs to play roulette with a rigged wheel. Canasta covers up the number Bugs bets on with a slab of wood and stops the wheel on another number. However, when Nasty Canasta bangs his fist on the table in glee, this causes the ball to bounce and land into a knothole on the piece of wood, getting Bugs even more. Canasta then proposes draw poker, which Bugs wins again.

Finally Canasta decides to rob Bugs at gunpoint on the pretense of it being another game of chance, namely Russian roulette. Bugs spins the revolver's cylinder like a slot machine and a mass of coins inexplicably pours out the gun's barrel.

As Bugs departs with all the casino's funds and more, Canasta dumbfoundedly looks at his pistol, then spins the revolver in an attempt to make coins pour from the barrel, just like Bugs did. However, he ends up shooting himself and keels over. Bugs then says to the audience "The moral of this story is don't try to steal no eighteen carrots from no rabbit".

== Home media ==
The short is available on Stars of Space Jam: Bugs Bunny VHS, on the fourth volume of the Looney Tunes Golden Collection DVD set, and the second volume of the Looney Tunes Platinum Collection Blu-ray set.

Preceded by Napoleon Bunny-Part	Bugs Bunny Cartoons; 1956	Succeeded by Half-Fare Hare
