= Duck Dodgers (TV series) =

American animated television series

- Genre: Comic science fiction; Science fantasy; Comedy
- Based on: Duck Dodgers in the 24½th Century by Charles M. Jones, Michael Maltese, & Warner Bros.
- Developed by: Spike Brandt; Tony Cervone
- Directed by: Spike Brandt; Tony Cervone
- Voices of: Joe Alaskey; Bob Bergen; Richard McGonagle; John O'Hurley; Michael Dorn; Tia Carrere
- Theme music composer: Wayne Coyne; Steven Drozd
- Opening theme: "Duck Dodgers", performed by Tom Jones and The Flaming Lips
- Ending theme: "Duck Dodgers" (Instrumental)
- Composers: Robert Kral; Douglas Romayne
- Country of origin: United States
- Original language: English
- No. of seasons: 3
- No. of episodes: 39 (65 segments) (list of episodes)

Production
- Executive producer: Sander Schwartz
- Producers: Paul Dini; Tom Minton; Linda M. Steiner
- Editor: Rob Desales
- Running time: 22 minutes
- Production companies: Warner Bros. Family Entertainment; Warner Bros. Animation (Note: Credited as Warner Bros. Television Animation in 2003.)

Original release
- Network: Cartoon Network
- Release: August 23, 2003 – April 22, 2005
- Network: Boomerang
- Release: September 16 – November 11, 2005

Related
- Baby Looney Tunes (2002–05); Loonatics Unleashed (2005–07)

Duck Dodgers (also known as Duck Dodgers: The Animated Series) is an American animated television series developed by Spike Brandt and Tony Cervone based on the 1953 theatrical animated short film of the same name, which stars the character Daffy Duck. It is a comic science fiction series, featuring the Looney Tunes characters in metafictional roles, with Daffy Duck reprising his titular role from the original short. It was produced by Warner Bros. Animation from 2003 to 2005. It originally aired on Cartoon Network and later ended on Boomerang.

== Concept ==
Though primarily based around the original Duck Dodgers short (which is set in roughly 2318 AD), the series also takes visual and thematic cues from other Looney Tunes shorts, with other Looney Tunes characters appearing in the series, albeit adapted to fit within the show's universe. For example, Yosemite Sam becomes "K'chutha Sa'am", a parody of Klingons in Star Trek, Elmer Fudd becomes "The Fudd", a parasitic mind-altering alien disease (a combination of the Flood and the Borg), Wile E. Coyote was a Predator-like alien hunter. Also appearing in the show in 24½th Century forms and alias are Witch Hazel, Count Bloodcount, Goofy Gophers, Nasty Canasta, Taz, Rocky and Mugsy, the Crusher, the Shropeshire Slasher from "Deduce, You Say!", Michigan J. Frog, Ralph Phillips from "From A to Z-Z-Z-Z", Egghead Junior, and the unnamed mad scientist from "Water, Water Every Hare".

== Theme song ==
The show's theme song (arranged by the Flaming Lips) is sung by Tom Jones, in a style reminiscent of the theme from the James Bond film Thunderball. Duck Dodgers once played a caricature of Jones, who was his singing voice in the second-season episode "Talent Show A Go-Go", singing his signature song, "It's Not Unusual".

== Accolades ==
Duck Dodgers was nominated in 2004 for an Annie Award for Outstanding Achievement in an Animated Television Production Produced For Children, Music in an Animated Television Production, Production Design in an Animated Television Production, and Voice Acting in an Animated Television Production. It won the Annie award in 2004, for Music in an Animated Television Production, music by Robert J. Kral. It was also nominated for an Emmy Award for Outstanding Sound Editing – Live Action and Animation and Special Class Animated Program in 2004, and again in 2005. It later won for Outstanding Performer in an Animated Program—Joe Alaskey. The series ended production in 2005 after its third season.

== Characters ==
=== Galactic Protectorate ===
- Duck Dodgers (voiced by Joe Alaskey) – A hapless soul that was accidentally frozen for over three centuries for unknown reasons. He was later revived by Dr. I.Q. Hi in the 24½th century. Dodgers is arrogant, lazy, gullible, and not particularly intelligent. However, throughout the series, he occasionally displays surprisingly high levels of heroism and competence, suggesting that he is not quite as daft as he appears to be, although he usually succeeds through sheer dumb luck and the work of the Eager Young Space Cadet. Though he doesn't show it often, Dodgers cares deeply for his cadet, even though he often demeans and puts him through humiliating situations. He is played by Daffy Duck.
- The Eager Young Space Cadet (voiced by Bob Bergen) – Looks up to Dodgers, seeing him as a father-figure in many ways. He is utterly loyal to Dodgers and doesn't doubt a word he says. Despite being much smarter than his so-called hero, he lets him give all the orders. Dodgers cares deeply for his Cadet though he rarely shows it, and often tries to take credit for the Cadet's work. Dodgers relies heavily on the Cadet's assistance and would likely fail most missions without it. The Cadet is also fairly successful as a ladies' man, often being the one who ends up with the woman Dodgers swoons over. He graduated summa cum laude from the Protectorate Academy. The Cadet is played by Porky Pig.
- Dr. I.Q. Hi (voiced by Richard McGonagle) – The overweight scientist that revived Dodgers after being frozen for three centuries. Serious and hard-working, he is often irritated and frustrated with Dodgers' incompetent side, and doubts that Dodgers truly was a 21st-century hero. In addition to being a hard-working scientist, he constantly wears gloves that stretch up his arm, ending at his elbow and leaving a gap between his fingertips and the glove's tips (which he did not wear in the 1953 short).
- Captain Star Johnson (voiced by John O'Hurley) – Johnson is a rival captain of Dodgers' in the Galactic Protectorate. Gifted with a university education, Johnson has a Flash Gordon-like personality about him, and once took Dodgers to court over his incompetence. Since then, Johnson has been involved in freeing Mars from the military coup by General Z9, and searching for gangsters when Dodgers went missing for a brief period of time. He also played rocketball in college.
- Bigfoot (voiced by Michael Patrick McGill) – In "The Six Wazillion Dollar Duck" (a parody of The Six Million Dollar Man), it was revealed that Bigfoot worked for the Protectorate as a Maintenance Supervisor and was also the first (thing) to receive cyborganic implants (Steve Boston was the first man to receive them, but before The Protectorate tested it on someone with a similar anatomy). These implants enhanced his combat abilities, as he is able to hold off several centurions before they bait and trapped him with pie. He is seemingly very uneducated as the only two words he says are "Duck" and "Stereo".

=== The Martian Empire ===
- Martian Commander X-2 (voiced by Joe Alaskey) – The confident commander of the Martian military who is Dodgers' archenemy and the antagonist of the series. He is infatuated with the Martian Queen that he serves, and considers Dodgers more of a nuisance than a true enemy. He once essentially created Duck Dodgers by going back in time and making him a hero so as to not be proven wrong by the Queen (the Queen did figure it out and punished him). He is played by Marvin the Martian.
- Queen Tyr'ahnee (voiced by Tia Carrere) – The beautiful ruler of Mars and Dodgers' love interest. Just like Cadet, she believes him to be a true hero. Her outfits are reminiscent of Martian Princesses in the John Carter of Mars book series.
- K-9 (voiced by Frank Welker) – Martian Commander X-2's dog.
- Centurion Robots (voiced by Michael Dorn) – The faithful robotic servants of the Mars Empire. They appear to be sentient, and make up a large portion of the Imperial Army, while the organic Martians act as officers. This is a homage to the Cylon Centurions of Battlestar Galactica. Dorn's casting may be a nod to his popular sci-fi character Worf from Star Trek: The Next Generation.
- Instant Martians – Strange bird-like Martian beings with purple hair. They are occasionally used by Commander X-2. They emerge from minuscule seeds that are activated upon contact with water. They first appeared in the 1958 cartoon Hare-Way to the Stars, in which the Martian Commander ordered them to capture Bugs Bunny.
- Martian General Z-9 (voiced by Corey Burton) - the treacherous general of the Martian military. He started off as a seemingly loyal confidante to the Martian Queen, but later betrayed her by holding her hostage to take over Mars for himself. He later attempted to initiate a full-scale attack on Earth, though his plan was foiled by the efforts of Dodgers, Cadet and X-2.

== Episodes ==
Season	Episodes		Originally released		
Season	Episodes		First released	Last released	Network
1	13		August 23, 2003	November 15, 2003	Cartoon Network
2	13		August 14, 2004	February 25, 2005	Cartoon Network
3	13	5	March 11, 2005	April 22, 2005	Cartoon Network
3	13	8	September 16, 2005	November 11, 2005	Boomerang

== Voice cast ==
- Joe Alaskey – (Daffy Duck as) Duck Dodgers, (Marvin the Martian as) Martian Commander X-2, Beaky Buzzard, Drake Darkstar, Hubie and Bertie, Rocky, Muttley
- Bob Bergen – (Porky Pig as) the Eager Young Space Cadet
- Richard McGonagle – Dr. I.Q. Hi
- Tia Carrere – Queen Tyr'ahnee
- Michael Dorn – Centurion Robots, Captain Long, Klunkin Warrior
- John O'Hurley – Captain Star Johnson

== Production ==
Spike Brandt and Tony Cervone were both fans of the Daffy Duck short Duck Dodgers in the 24½th Century and spent six years trying to get the concept made as either a TV series or feature film until the two were given a production commitment. After a prime time Daffy Duck series Brandt and Cervone were developing with Paul Rugg described as The Larry Sanders Show meets Jack Benny failed to emerge from development hell, Brandt and Cervone moved on to Duck Dodgers and incorporated some of their unused concepts.

== Home media ==
Warner Home Video released Duck Dodgers – The Complete First Season: Dark Side of the Duck to DVD on February 19, 2013, Duck Dodgers – The Complete Second Season: Deep Space Duck on July 23, 2013, and Duck Dodgers - The Complete Third Season on January 28, 2020. Unlike the previous 2 seasons released on DVD the 3rd was released on a DVD-R. The complete series was released on Blu-ray on March 28, 2023. The Blu-ray set also includes the original 1953 short Duck Dodgers in the 24½th Century as a bonus feature.

Season	Title	Episodes	Release date
1	The Complete First Season: Dark Side of the Duck	13	February 19, 2013
2	The Complete Second Season: Deep Space Duck	13	July 23, 2013
3	The Complete Third Season	13	January 28, 2020

== See also ==
- Looney Tunes
- Daffy Duck
- Duck Dodgers
- List of Duck Dodgers characters
